= FIS Snowboarding World Championships 2013 – Women's parallel giant slalom =

The women's parallel giant slalom competition of the FIS Snowboarding World Championships 2013 was held in Stoneham-et-Tewkesbury, Quebec on January 25, 2013. 46 athletes from 19 countries competed.

== Medalists ==
Gold	Isabella Laböck; Germany (GER)
Silver	Julia Dujmovits; Austria (AUT)
Bronze	Amelie Kober; Germany (GER)

== Results ==
=== Qualification ===
Each participant takes one run on either of the courses. After the first run, only the top 16 are allowed a second run on the opposite course.

Rank	Bib	Name	Country	Blue Course	Red Course	Overall Time	Notes
1	3	Alena Zavarzina	Russia	44.17	41.93	1:26.10	Q
2	4	Julia Dujmovits	Austria	41.87	44.45	1:26.32	Q
3	7	Amelie Kober	Germany	44.29	42.41	1:26.70	Q
4	1	Svetlana Boldykova	Russia	43.42	43.47	1:26.89	Q
5	8	Isabella Laböck	Germany	42.98	44.32	1:27.30	Q
6	6	Claudia Riegler	Austria	42.93	44.41	1:27.34	Q
7	13	Tomoka Takeuchi	Japan	44.30	43.05	1:27.35	Q
8	11	Hilde-Katrine Engeli	Norway	44.21	43.17	1:27.38	Q
9	12	Marion Kreiner	Austria	43.61	43.85	1:27.46	Q
10	14	Yekaterina Tudegesheva	Russia	43.30	44.35	1:27.65	Q
11	9	Patrizia Kummer	Switzerland	44.54	43.53	1:28.07	Q
12	2	Stefanie Müller	Switzerland	43.46	44.69	1:28.15	Q
13	24	Alena Kuleshova	Russia	43.96	44.24	1:28.20	Q
14	5	Ina Meschik	Austria	44.86	43.58	1:28.44	Q
15	10	Selina Jörg	Germany	44.12	44.84	1:28.96	Q
16	25	Ester Ledecka	Czech Republic	44.66	44.34	1:29.00	Q
17	31	Eri Yanetani	Japan	44.79	44.73	1:29.52	
18	27	Nicolien Sauerbreij	Netherlands	46.50	43.27	1:29.77	
19	33	Valeriya Tsoy	Kazakhstan	45.05	44.75	1:29.80	
20	32	Nathalie Desmares	France	45.20	44.67	1:29.87	
21	26	Yvonne Schütz	Switzerland	44.08	46.06	1:30.14	
22	28	Yekaterina Ilyukhina	Russia	44.51	46.18	1:30.69	
23	30	Nadya Ochner	Italy	45.32	45.39	1:30.71	
24	35	Ekaterina Zavialova	Canada	45.78	45.19	1:30.97	
25	20	Annamari Chundak	Ukraine	45.21	45.85	1:31.06	
26	21	Aleksandra Krol	Poland	45.73	45.76	1:31.49	
27	41	Marieke Sauerbreij	Netherlands	46.25	45.43	1:31.68	
28	34	Weronika Biela	Poland	45.71	45.99	1:31.70	
29	18	Madeline Wiencke	United States	45.28	46.56	1:31.84	
30	23	Andrea Christine Tribus	Italy	48.44	45.31	1:33.75	
31	22	Marianne Leeson	Canada	44.08	49.99	1:34.07	
32	15	Anke Karstens	Germany	52.10	42.72	1:34.82	
33	37	Gloria Kotnik	Slovenia		45.86		
34	16	Caroline Calvé	Canada	45.93			
35	44	Li Xiaotong	China	46.09			
36	42	Niu Jiaqi	China	46.81			
37	38	Lynn Ott	United States	47.15			
38	29	Ariane Lavigne	Canada		47.48		
39	40	Shin Da-Hae	South Korea	47.86			
40	39	Oksana Dmytriv	Ukraine		48.55		
41	19	Corinna Boccacini	Italy		48.78		
42	46	Lu Wenping	China	48.93			
43	36	Karolina Sztokfisz	Poland	49.33			
44	43	Xu Xiaoxiao	China		49.50		
45	45	Vanda Viszlay	Hungary		50.29		
	17	Jeong Hae-Rim	South Korea		DNF		

=== Elimination round ===
Round of 16
1	Alena Zavarzina (RUS)	W
16	Ester Ledecka (CZE)	+12.37
8	Hilde-Katrine Engeli (NOR)	W
9	Marion Kreiner (AUT)	+3.80
5	Isabella Laböck (GER)	W
12	Stefanie Müller (SUI)	+1.10
4	Svetlana Boldykova (RUS)	W
13	Alena Kuleshova (RUS)	+0.39
3	Amelie Kober (GER)	W
14	Ina Meschik (AUT)	DSQ
6	Claudia Riegler (AUT)	0.24
11	Patrizia Kummer (SUI)	W
7	Tomoka Takeuchi (JPN)	W
10	Yekaterina Tudegesheva (RUS)	+0.56
2	Julia Dujmovits (AUT)	W
15	Selina Jörg (GER)	DSQ

Quarterfinals
1	Alena Zavarzina (RUS)	+0.53
8	Hilde-Katrine Engeli (NOR)	W
5	Isabella Laböck (GER)	W
4	Svetlana Boldykova (RUS)	+1.28
3	Amelie Kober (GER)	W
11	Patrizia Kummer (SUI)	+0.36
7	Tomoka Takeuchi (JPN)	+9.39
2	Julia Dujmovits (AUT)	W

Semifinals
8	Hilde-Katrine Engeli (NOR)	DSQ
5	Isabella Laböck (GER)	W
3	Amelie Kober (GER)	+0.82
2	Julia Dujmovits (AUT)	W

Finals
5	Isabella Laböck (GER)	W
2	Julia Dujmovits (AUT)	+0.68
Third place
8	Hilde-Katrine Engeli (NOR)	+0.26
3	Amelie Kober (GER)	W
