= FIS Snowboarding World Championships 2013 – Women's parallel slalom =

International sporting competition

The women's parallel slalom competition of the FIS Snowboarding World Championships 2013 was held in Stoneham-et-Tewkesbury, Quebec on January 27, 2013. 45 athletes from 19 countries competed.

== Medalists ==
Gold	Yekaterina Tudegesheva; Russia (RUS)
Silver	Patrizia Kummer; Switzerland (SUI)
Bronze	Amelie Kober; Germany (GER)

== Results ==
=== Qualification ===
Each participant takes one run on either of the courses. After the first run, only the top 16 are allowed a second run on the opposite course.

Rank	Bib	Name	Country	Blue Course	Red Course	Overall Time	Notes
1	1	Amelie Kober	Germany	39.52	37.04	1:16.56	Q
2	5	Patrizia Kummer	Switzerland	39.10	38.45	1:17.55	Q
3	7	Hilde-Katrine Engeli	Norway	39.45	38.65	1:18.10	Q
4	6	Alena Zavarzina	Russia	37.37	40.74	1:18.11	Q
5	9	Yekaterina Tudegesheva	Russia	39.83	38.28	1:18.11	Q
6	11	Marion Kreiner	Austria	39.82	38.35	1:18.17	Q
7	2	Julia Dujmovits	Austria	38.09	40.14	1:18.23	Q
8	4	Stefanie Müller	Switzerland	38.22	40.35	1:18.57	Q
9	10	Isabella Laböck	Germany	37.95	41.05	1:19.00	Q
10	15	Natalia Soboleva	Russia	40.15	39.03	1:19.18	Q
11	17	Sabine Schöffmann	Austria	38.92	40.31	1:19.23	Q
12	12	Svetlana Boldykova	Russia	38.78	40.50	1:19.28	Q
13	14	Tomoka Takeuchi	Japan	39.31	39.97	1:19.28	Q
14	29	Nadya Ochner	Italy	40.02	39.42	1:19.44	Q
15	16	Claudia Riegler	Austria	38.77	41.19	1:19.96	Q
16	27	Nicolien Sauerbreij	Netherlands	40.38	39.71	1:20.09	Q
17	13	Selina Jörg	Germany	41.11	39.14	1:20.25	
18	25	Ester Ledecka	Czech Republic	40.24	40.01	1:20.25	
19	3	Caroline Calvé	Canada	39.46	40.84	1:20.30	
20	19	Madeline Wiencke	United States	40.33	39.97	1:20.30	
21	26	Yvonne Schütz	Switzerland	39.39	40.98	1:20.37	
22	36	Gloria Kotnik	Slovenia	39.49	41.36	1:20.85	
23	30	Eri Yanetani	Japan	39.31	41.79	1:21.10	
24	28	Ariane Lavigne	Canada	39.04	42.35	1:21.39	
25	20	Corinna Boccacini	Italy	39.57	42.26	1:21.83	
26	32	Valeriya Tsoy	Kazakhstan	40.12	41.71	1:21.83	
27	24	Andrea Christine Tribus	Italy	40.42	41.52	1:21.94	
28	34	Ekaterina Zavialova	Canada	40.11	41.88	1:21.99	
29	22	Aleksandra Krol	Poland	40.71	41.98	1:22.69	
30	33	Weronika Biela	Poland	41.66	41.60	1:23.26	
31	21	Annamari Chundak	Ukraine	44.10	39.29	1:23.39	
32	31	Nathalie Desmares	France	43.25	41.11	1:24.36	
33	18	Jeong Hae-Rim	South Korea	40.84			
34	43	Li Xiaotong	China		43.53		
35	38	Oksana Dmytriv	Ukraine	43.55			
36	42	Xu Xiaoxiao	China	44.64			
37	45	Lu Wenping	China		45.62		
38	44	Vanda Viszlay	Hungary	46.01			
39	40	Marieke Sauerbreij	Netherlands	47.31			
40	41	Niu Jiaqi	China		47.39		
	37	Lynn Ott	United States		DNF		
	35	Karolina Sztokfisz	Poland		DNF		
	39	Shin Da-Hae	South Korea		DSQ		
	23	Marianne Leeson	Canada		DSQ		
	8	Anke Karstens	Germany	DSQ			

=== Elimination round ===
Round of 16
1	Amelie Kober (GER)	W
16	Nicolien Sauerbreij (NED)	DSQ
8	Stefanie Müller (SUI)	+0.40
9	Isabella Laböck (GER)	W
5	Yekaterina Tudegesheva (RUS)	W
12	Svetlana Boldykova (RUS)	+1.74
4	Alena Zavarzina (RUS)	DSQ
13	Tomoka Takeuchi (JPN)	W
3	Hilde-Katrine Engeli (NOR)	W
14	Nadya Ochner (ITA)	+0.61
6	Marion Kreiner (AUT)	W
11	Sabine Schöffmann (AUT)	DSQ
7	Julia Dujmovits (AUT)	DSQ
10	Natalia Soboleva (RUS)	W
2	Patrizia Kummer (SUI)	W
15	Claudia Riegler (AUT)	+1.33

Quarterfinals
1	Amelie Kober (GER)	W
9	Isabella Laböck (GER)	+1.35
5	Yekaterina Tudegesheva (RUS)	W
13	Tomoka Takeuchi (JPN)	DSQ
3	Hilde-Katrine Engeli (NOR)	W
6	Marion Kreiner (AUT)	DSQ
10	Natalia Soboleva (RUS)	+1.21
2	Patrizia Kummer (SUI)	W

Semifinals
1	Amelie Kober (GER)	+2.58
5	Yekaterina Tudegesheva (RUS)	W
3	Hilde-Katrine Engeli (NOR)	+1.01
2	Patrizia Kummer (SUI)	W

Finals
5	Yekaterina Tudegesheva (RUS)	W
2	Patrizia Kummer (SUI)	+1.82
Third place
1	Amelie Kober (GER)	W
3	Hilde-Katrine Engeli (NOR)	DSQ
