= Snowboarding at the 2014 Winter Olympics – Women's parallel giant slalom =

Women's parallel giant slalom at the XXII Olympic Winter Games
- Venue: Rosa Khutor Extreme Park
- Date: 19 February 2014
- Competitors: 32 from 15 nations

Medalists
1st place, gold medalist(s)		Patrizia Kummer	Switzerland
2nd place, silver medalist(s)		Tomoka Takeuchi	Japan
3rd place, bronze medalist(s)		Alena Zavarzina	Russia

The women's parallel giant slalom competition of the Sochi 2014 Olympics was held at Rosa Khutor Extreme Park on 19 February 2014.

== Schedule ==
All times are (UTC+4).

Date	Time	Round
19 February	9:15	Qualification
19 February	13:00	1/8 finals
19 February	13:48	Quarterfinals
19 February	14:15	Semifinals
19 February	14:31	Finals

== Results ==
=== Qualification ===
The qualification was started at 09:15.

Rank	Bib	Name	Country	Red Course	Blue Course	Total	Notes
1	8	Tomoka Takeuchi	Japan	54.33	52.00	1:46.33	Q
2	1	Patrizia Kummer	Switzerland	52.63	53.99	1:46.62	Q
3	27	Julie Zogg	Switzerland	53.40	53.71	1:47.11	Q
4	10	Nicolien Sauerbreij	Netherlands	53.59	53.63	1:47.22	Q
5	24	Marianne Leeson	Canada	54.57	52.84	1:47.41	Q
6	21	Alena Zavarzina	Russia	53.31	54.34	1:47.65	Q
7	15	Claudia Riegler	Austria	54.04	54.68	1:48.62	Q
8	13	Caroline Calvé	Canada	53.68	55.11	1:48.79	Q
9	18	Ekaterina Ilyukhina	Russia	55.39	53.63	1:49.02	Q
10	4	Ester Ledecká	Czech Republic	53.77	55.40	1:49.17	Q
11	5	Selina Jörg	Germany	56.25	53.39	1:49.64	Q
12	22	Ladina Jenny	Switzerland	56.14	54.27	1:50.41	Q
13	11	Ina Meschik	Austria	56.38	54.94	1:51.32	Q
14	14	Ariane Lavigne	Canada	56.36	55.33	1:51.69	Q
15	16	Ekaterina Tudegesheva	Russia	54.33	57.44	1:51.77	Q
16	28	Corinna Boccacini	Italy	56.78	55.07	1:51.85	Q
17	25	Stefanie Müller	Switzerland	57.08	54.90	1:51.98	
18	20	Isabella Laböck	Germany	56.99	55.02	1:52.01	
19	7	Hilde-Katrine Engeli	Norway	55.26	57.03	1:52.29	
20	12	Marion Kreiner	Austria	55.30	57.10	1:52.40	
21	31	Annamari Chundak	Ukraine	57.61	56.10	1:53.71	
22	23	Michelle Dekker	Netherlands	56.50	57.24	1:53.74	
23	26	Valeriya Tsoy	Kazakhstan	57.04	57.53	1:54.57	
24	29	Gloria Kotnik	Slovenia	1:00.85	56.83	1:57.68	
25	3	Anke Karstens	Germany	1:05.90	53.39	1:59.29	
26	19	Nadya Ochner	Italy	1:04.08	55.80	1:59.88	
27	32	Nina Micić	Serbia	1:04.01	1:00.93	2:04.94	
28	30	Karolina Sztokfisz	Poland	1:09.96	58.44	2:08.40	
29	6	Julia Dujmovits	Austria	DSQ	59.98	DSQ	DSQ
30	2	Amelie Kober	Germany	DSQ	1:35.30	DSQ	DSQ
	17	Natalia Soboleva	Russia	DSQ	—	DSQ	DSQ
	9	Aleksandra Król	Poland	DSQ	—	DSQ	DSQ

=== Elimination round ===
The 16 best racers advanced to the elimination round.

1/8 finals
1	Takeuchi (JPN)
16	Boccacini (ITA)	+1.93
9	Ilyukhina (RUS)	+0.03
8	Calvé (CAN)
5	Leeson (CAN)
12	Jenny (SUI)	+0.30
13	Meschik (AUT)
4	Sauerbreij (NED)	+0.05
14	Lavigne (CAN)
3	Zogg (SUI)	+0.12
6	Zavarzina (RUS)
11	Jörg (GER)	+13.53
7	Riegler (AUT)	+0.49
10	Ledecká (CZE)
2	Kummer (SUI)
15	Tudegesheva (RUS)	+0.76

Quarterfinals
1	Takeuchi (JPN)
8	Calvé (CAN)	+4.00
5	Leeson (CAN)	+0.30
13	Meschik (AUT)
14	Lavigne (CAN)	+7.27
6	Zavarzina (RUS)
10	Ledecká (CZE)	+0.30
2	Kummer (SUI)

Semifinals
1	Takeuchi (JPN)
13	Meschik (AUT)	DSQ
6	Zavarzina (RUS)	DSQ
2	Kummer (SUI)

Finals
1	Takeuchi (JPN)	+7.32
2	Kummer (SUI)
Third place
13	Meschik (AUT)	+0.82
6	Zavarzina (RUS)
