= Snowboarding at the 2014 Winter Olympics – Women's parallel slalom =

Women's parallel slalom at the XXII Olympic Winter Games
- Venue: Rosa Khutor Extreme Park
- Date: 22 February 2014
- Competitors: 32 from 15 nations

Medalists
| 1st place, gold medalist(s) | | Julia Dujmovits | Austria |
| 2nd place, silver medalist(s) | | Anke Karstens | Germany |
| 3rd place, bronze medalist(s) | | Amelie Kober | Germany |

The women's parallel slalom competition of the Sochi 2014 Olympics was held at Rosa Khutor Extreme Park on 22 February 2014.

== Schedule ==
All times are (UTC+4).

| Date | Time | Round |
|---|---|---|
| 22 February | 9:15 | Qualification |
| 22 February | 13:15 | 1/8 finals |
| 22 February | 14:03 | Quarterfinals |
| 22 February | 14:30 | Semifinals |
| 22 February | 14:46 | Finals |

== Results ==
The event was started at 09:15.

=== Qualification ===
| Rank | Bib | Name | Country | Red Course | Blue Course | Total | Notes |
|---|---|---|---|---|---|---|---|
| 1 | 15 | Marion Kreiner | Austria | 31.33 | 32.25 | 1:03.58 | Q |
| 2 | 12 | Ester Ledecká | Czech Republic | 31.90 | 31.84 | 1:03.74 | Q |
| 3 | 8 | Patrizia Kummer | Switzerland | 32.15 | 31.67 | 1:03.82 | Q |
| 4 | 27 | Julie Zogg | Switzerland | 31.51 | 32.41 | 1:03.92 | Q |
| 5 | 13 | Julia Dujmovits | Austria | 32.28 | 32.05 | 1:04.33 | Q |
| 6 | 20 | Isabella Laböck | Germany | 31.80 | 32.64 | 1:04.44 | Q |
| 7 | 7 | Selina Jörg | Germany | 31.52 | 32.95 | 1:04.47 | Q |
| 8 | 28 | Corinna Boccacini | Italy | 32.48 | 32.48 | 1:04.96 | Q |
| 9 | 2 | Claudia Riegler | Austria | 33.13 | 32.01 | 1:05.14 | Q |
| 10 | 9 | Anke Karstens | Germany | 32.64 | 32.50 | 1:05.14 | Q |
| 11 | 1 | Ina Meschik | Austria | 32.17 | 32.98 | 1:05.15 | Q |
| 12 | 21 | Alena Zavarzina | Russia | 32.45 | 32.87 | 1:05.32 | Q |
| 13 | 14 | Tomoka Takeuchi | Japan | 32.78 | 32.63 | 1:05.41 | Q |
| 14 | 5 | Amelie Kober | Germany | 32.53 | 32.93 | 1:05.46 | Q |
| 15 | 17 | Natalia Soboleva | Russia | 32.57 | 32.91 | 1:05.48 | Q |
| 16 | 10 | Ekaterina Tudegesheva | Russia | 32.48 | 33.06 | 1:05.54 | Q |
| 17 | 11 | Ariane Lavigne | Canada | 32.80 | 32.80 | 1:05.60 | |
| 18 | 25 | Stefanie Müller | Switzerland | 32.25 | 33.39 | 1:05.64 | |
| 19 | 23 | Michelle Dekker | Netherlands | 32.52 | 33.14 | 1:05.66 | |
| 20 | 4 | Nicolien Sauerbreij | Netherlands | 32.78 | 32.91 | 1:05.69 | |
| 21 | 31 | Annamari Chundak | Ukraine | 32.51 | 33.25 | 1:05.76 | |
| 22 | 19 | Nadya Ochner | Italy | 32.66 | 33.13 | 1:05.79 | |
| 23 | 29 | Gloria Kotnik | Slovenia | 33.06 | 32.88 | 1:05.94 | |
| 24 | 22 | Ladina Jenny | Switzerland | 33.22 | 32.74 | 1:05.96 | |
| 25 | 30 | Karolina Sztokfisz | Poland | 32.85 | 33.16 | 1:06.01 | |
| 26 | 16 | Caroline Calve | Canada | 33.34 | 32.81 | 1:06.15 | |
| 27 | 24 | Marianne Leeson | Canada | 33.45 | 32.81 | 1:06.26 | |
| 28 | 6 | Hilde-Katrine Engeli | Norway | 32.81 | 33.48 | 1:06.29 | |
| 29 | 18 | Ekaterina Ilyukhina | Russia | 33.15 | 33.58 | 1:06.73 | |
| 30 | 3 | Aleksandra Krol | Poland | 33.60 | 33.82 | 1:07.42 | |
| 31 | 32 | Nina Micić | Serbia | 33.64 | 34.43 | 1:08.07 | |
| 32 | 26 | Valeriya Tsoy | Kazakhstan | 33.88 | 34.79 | 1:08.67 | |

=== Elimination round ===
1/8 finals
1 | Kreiner (AUT)
16 | Tudegesheva (RUS) | +6.04
8 | Boccacini (ITA)
9 | Riegler (AUT) | +2.78
5 | Dujmovits (AUT)
12 | Zavarzina (RUS) | +0.24
4 | Zogg (SUI)
13 | Takeuchi (JPN) | DSQ
3 | Kummer (SUI) | +0.10
14 | Kober (GER)
6 | Laböck (GER) | +0.24
11 | Meschik (AUT)
7 | Jörg (GER) | +0.02
10 | Karstens (GER)
2 | Ledecká (CZE)
15 | Soboleva (RUS) | +0.18

Quarterfinals
1 | Kreiner (AUT) | +0.05
8 | Boccacini (ITA)
5 | Dujmovits (AUT)
4 | Zogg (SUI) | DSQ
14 | Kober (GER)
11 | Meschik (AUT) | +0.01
10 | Karstens (GER)
2 | Ledecká (CZE) | +0.30

Semifinals
8 | Boccacini (ITA) | +5.18
5 | Dujmovits (AUT)
14 | Kober (GER) | +0.09
10 | Karstens (GER)

Finals
5 | Dujmovits (AUT)
10 | Karstens (GER) | +0.12
Third place
8 | Boccacini (ITA) | +0.13
14 | Kober (GER)

=== Final standings ===
| Rank | Bib | Name | Country |
|---|---|---|---|
| 1st place, gold medalist(s) | 13 | Julia Dujmovits | Austria |
| 2nd place, silver medalist(s) | 9 | Anke Karstens | Germany |
| 3rd place, bronze medalist(s) | 5 | Amelie Kober | Germany |
| 4 | 28 | Corinna Boccacini | Italy |
| 5 | 15 | Marion Kreiner | Austria |
| 6 | 12 | Ester Ledecká | Czech Republic |
| 7 | 27 | Julie Zogg | Switzerland |
| 8 | 1 | Ina Meschik | Austria |
| 9 | 8 | Patrizia Kummer | Switzerland |
| 10 | 20 | Isabella Laböck | Germany |
| 11 | 7 | Selina Jörg | Germany |
| 12 | 2 | Claudia Riegler | Austria |
| 13 | 21 | Alena Zavarzina | Russia |
| 14 | 14 | Tomoka Takeuchi | Japan |
| 15 | 17 | Natalia Soboleva | Russia |
| 16 | 10 | Ekaterina Tudegesheva | Russia |
| 17 | 11 | Ariane Lavigne | Canada |
| 18 | 25 | Stefanie Müller | Switzerland |
| 19 | 23 | Michelle Dekker | Netherlands |
| 20 | 4 | Nicolien Sauerbreij | Netherlands |
| 21 | 31 | Annamari Chundak | Ukraine |
| 22 | 19 | Nadya Ochner | Italy |
| 23 | 29 | Gloria Kotnik | Slovenia |
| 24 | 22 | Ladina Jenny | Switzerland |
| 25 | 30 | Karolina Sztokfisz | Poland |
| 26 | 16 | Caroline Calve | Canada |
| 27 | 24 | Marianne Leeson | Canada |
| 28 | 6 | Hilde-Katrine Engeli | Norway |
| 29 | 18 | Yekaterina Ilyukhina | Russia |
| 30 | 3 | Aleksandra Krol | Poland |
| 31 | 32 | Nina Micić | Serbia |
| 32 | 26 | Valeriya Tsoy | Kazakhstan |
