= Snowboarding at the 2015 Winter Universiade – Women's parallel giant slalom =

The women's parallel giant slalom competition of the 2015 Winter Universiade was held at Sulayr Snowpark, Sierra Nevada, Spain at February 10, 2015.

== Results ==
=== Qualification ===
Rank	Bib	Name	Country	Blue Course	Rank	Red Course	Rank	Total	Notes
1	9	Patrizia Kummer	Switzerland	30.38	15	28	1	58.38	Q
2	11	Selina Jörg	Germany	30.14	10	28.25	2	58.39	Q
3	6	Darya Groznova	Russia	28.84	1	29.59	8	58.43	Q
4	14	Nicole Baumgartner	Switzerland	28.87	2	30.11	9	58.98	Q
5	13	Nadya Ochner	Italy	30.28	12	28.8	4	59.08	Q
6	7	Weronika Biela	Poland	30.22	11	28.94	5	59.16	Q
7	5	Stefanie Müller	Switzerland	30.59	16	28.68	3	59.27	Q
8	3	Aleksandra Król	Poland	30.28	12	29.01	6	59.29	Q
9	16	Shin Da-Hae	South Korea	28.98	3	30.33	10	59.31	Q
10	2	Karolina Sztokfisz	Poland	29.33	4	30.43	11	59.76	Q
11	8	Emilie Aurange	France	29.44	6	30.46	12	59.9	Q
12	28	Darja Latyntseva	Russia	29.4	5	30.63	15	1:00.03	Q
13	18	Lee Ji-Hye	South Korea	29.84	9	30.62	14	1:00.46	Q
14	26	Regina Suraeva	Russia	29.59	=7	31.04	16	1:01.62	Q
15	1	Sabine Schöffmann	Austria	29.59	=7	32.03	20	1:01.62	Q
16	12	Jessica Keiser	Switzerland	30.34	14	31.43	19	1:01.77	Q
17	4	Yvette Heijt	Netherlands	31.3	19	31.24	17	1:02.54	
18	20	Iva Polanec	Slovenia	30.69	17	32.14	21	1:02.83	
19	22	Natalia Ficek	Poland	31.81	20	32.68	22	1:04.49	
20	30	Pia Maria Meschik	Austria	32.99	21	32.83	23	1:05.82	
21	15	Megan Farrell	Canada	31.11	18	34.74	26	1:05.85	
22	21	Kim A-Reum	South Korea	35.56	22	31.29	18	1:06.85	
23	29	Dariya Slobodkina	Kazakhstan	38.12	26	33.17	24	1:11.29	
24	24	Elif Kübra Geneşke	Turkey	36.98	24	34.99	27	1:11.97	
25	27	Elif Ece Limon	Turkey	37.76	25	35.11	28	1:12.87	
26	19	Vera Kolegova	Russia	48.18	27	29.07	7	1:17.25	
27	31	Anna Yamada	United States	36.91	23	42.93	29	1:19.84	
28	17	Giulia Gaspari	Italy	DSQ		30.56	13		
29	23	Chrisy Richardson	Australia	DSQ		33.58	25		
	10	Julia Dujmovits	Austria	DSQ					DSQ
	25	Xenia Tupik	Kazakhstan			DNS			DNS

=== Elimination round ===
The 16 best racers advanced to the elimination round.

1/8 Finals
14	Baumgartner (SUI)	Q
18	Lee (KOR)
13	Ochner (ITA)	Q
28	Latyntseva (RUS)
3	Król (POL)	Q
16	Shin (KOR)
9	Kummer (SUI)	Q
12	Keiser (SUI)
11	Jörg (GER)	Q
1	Schöffmann (AUT)
5	Müller (SUI)
2	Sztokfisz (POL)	Q
7	Biela (POL)	Q
8	Aurange (FRA)
6	Groznova (RUS)	Q
26	Suraeva (RUS)

Quarterfinals
14	Baumgartner (SUI)
13	Ochner (ITA)	Q
3	Król (POL)
9	Kummer (SUI)	Q
11	Jörg (GER)	Q
2	Sztokfisz (POL)
7	Biela (POL)
6	Groznova (RUS)	Q

Semifinals
13	Ochner (ITA)
9	Kummer (SUI)	Q
11	Jörg (GER)	Q
6	Groznova (RUS)

Finals
9	Kummer (SUI)	1st place, gold medalist(s)
11	Jörg (GER)	2nd place, silver medalist(s)
Third place
13	Ochner (ITA)	3rd place, bronze medalist(s)
6	Groznova (RUS)
