= Snowboarding at the 2014 Winter Olympics =

Snowboarding at the XXII Olympic Winter Games
- Pictograms for, clockwise from top left, cross, halfpipe, slopestyle and giant parallel slalom.
- Venue: Rosa Khutor Extreme Park, Krasnaya Polyana, Russia
- Dates: 6–22 February 2014
- No. of events: 10
- Competitors: 243 from 31 nations

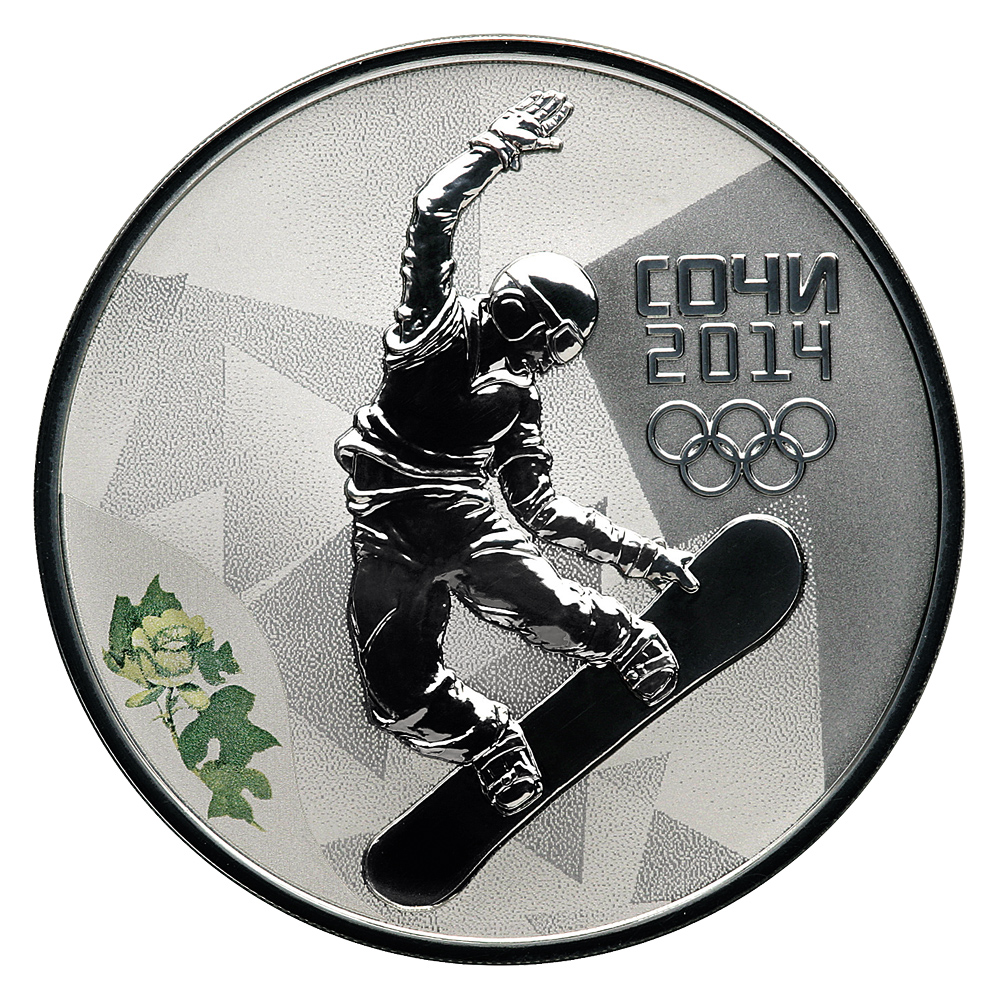
Snowboarding at the 2014 Winter Olympics

Snowboarding at the 2014 Winter Olympics in Sochi was held at the Rosa Khutor Extreme Park. The events were held between 6 and 22 February 2014. A total of ten snowboarding events were held at Sochi 2014 which include parallel giant slalom, snowboard cross, half-pipe, and the new events of parallel slalom and slopestyle.

A crash in practice from Norwegian slopestyle snowboarder Torstein Horgmo, who fractured his collarbone, and complaints from other athletes that some jumps were too steep prompted organisers to modify the slopestyle course in the week before the Games.

== Competition schedule ==
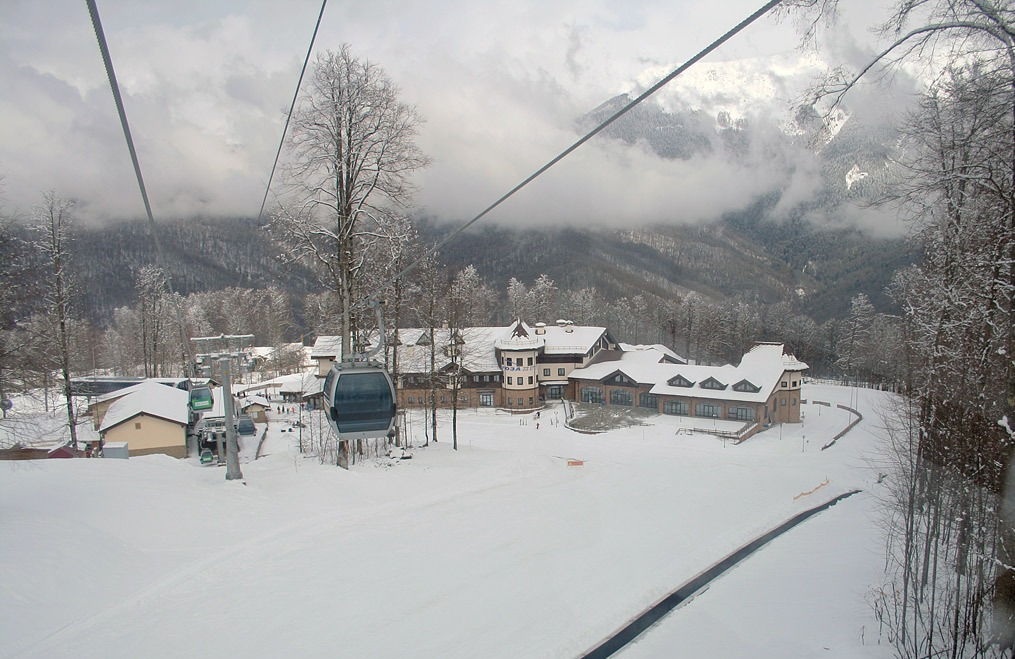
Rosa Khutor Alpine Resort, the venue for snowboard

The following is the competition schedule for all ten events.

All times are (UTC+4).

Date	Time	Event
6 February	10:00	Men's and Women's slopestyle qualification
8 February	09:30	Men's slopestyle semifinals
8 February	12:45	Men's slopestyle
9 February	10:30	Women's slopestyle qualification
9 February	13:15	Women's slopestyle
11 February	14:00	Men's halfpipe
11 February	19:00	Men's halfpipe qualification
11 February	21:30	Men's halfpipe
12 February	14:00	Women's halfpipe
12 February	19:00	Women's halfpipe qualification
12 February	21:30	Women's halfpipe
16 February	11:00	Women's snowboard cross qualification
16 February	13:15	Women's snowboard cross
17 February	11:00	Men's snowboard cross qualification
17 February	13:30	Men's snowboard cross
19 February	09:00	Men's and Women's parallel giant slalom qualification
19 February	13:00	Men's and Women's parallel giant slalom
22 February	09:15	Men's and Women's parallel slalom qualification
22 February	13:15	Men's and Women's parallel slalom

== Medal summary ==
=== Medal table ===
* Host nation (Russia)

Rank	Nation	Gold	Silver	Bronze	Total
1	United States	3	0	2	5
2	Russia*	2	1	1	4
3	Switzerland	2	1	0	3
4	Austria	1	0	1	2
4	France	1	0	1	2
6	Czech Republic	1	0	0	1
7	Japan	0	2	1	3
8	Canada	0	1	1	2
8	Germany	0	1	1	2
8	Slovenia	0	1	1	2
11	Australia	0	1	0	1
11	Finland	0	1	0	1
11	Norway	0	1	0	1
14	Great Britain	0	0	1	1
Totals (14 entries)		10	10	10	30

=== Men's events ===
Games	Gold		Silver		Bronze	
Parallel slalom	Vic Wild; Russia		Žan Košir; Slovenia		Benjamin Karl; Austria	
Parallel giant slalom	Vic Wild; Russia		Nevin Galmarini; Switzerland		Žan Košir; Slovenia	
Halfpipe	Iouri Podladtchikov; Switzerland	94.75	Ayumu Hirano; Japan	93.50	Taku Hiraoka; Japan	92.25
Slopestyle	Sage Kotsenburg; United States	93.50	Ståle Sandbech; Norway	91.75	Mark McMorris; Canada	88.75
Snowboard cross	Pierre Vaultier; France		Nikolay Olyunin; Russia		Alex Deibold; United States	

=== Women's events ===
Games	Gold		Silver		Bronze	
Parallel slalom	Julia Dujmovits; Austria		Anke Karstens; Germany		Amelie Kober; Germany	
Parallel giant slalom	Patrizia Kummer; Switzerland		Tomoka Takeuchi; Japan		Alena Zavarzina; Russia	
Halfpipe	Kaitlyn Farrington; United States	91.75	Torah Bright; Australia	91.50	Kelly Clark; United States	90.75
Slopestyle	Jamie Anderson; United States	95.25	Enni Rukajärvi; Finland	92.50	Jenny Jones; Great Britain	87.25
Snowboard cross	Eva Samkova; Czech Republic		Dominique Maltais; Canada		Chloé Trespeuch; France	

== Qualification ==
A total of 252 quota spots were available to athletes to compete at the games. A maximum of 24 athletes could be entered by a National Olympic Committee, with a maximum of 14 men or 14 women. The five different events had different quota numbers allocated to them. Countries are allowed to enter the same athlete into more than one event, further reducing the number of athletes competing.

== Participating nations ==
243 athletes from 31 nations participated, with number of athletes in parentheses. Croatia, Kazakhstan and Serbia made their Olympic debuts in the sport.

- Andorra (1)
- Australia (11)
- Austria (17)
- Belgium (1)
- Brazil (1)
- Bulgaria (2)
- Canada (24)
- China (6)
- Croatia (1)
- Czech Republic (5)
- Finland (11)
- France (13)
- Germany (10)
- Great Britain (7)
- Ireland (1)
- Italy (12)
- Japan (8)
- Kazakhstan (1)
- Netherlands (6)
- New Zealand (5)
- Norway (9)
- Poland (6)
- Russia (15)
- Serbia (1)
- Slovenia (10)
- South Korea (4)
- Spain (4)
- Sweden (2)
- Switzerland (24)
- Ukraine (2)
- United States (23)
