= Ina Meschik =

Austrian snowboarder (born 1990)

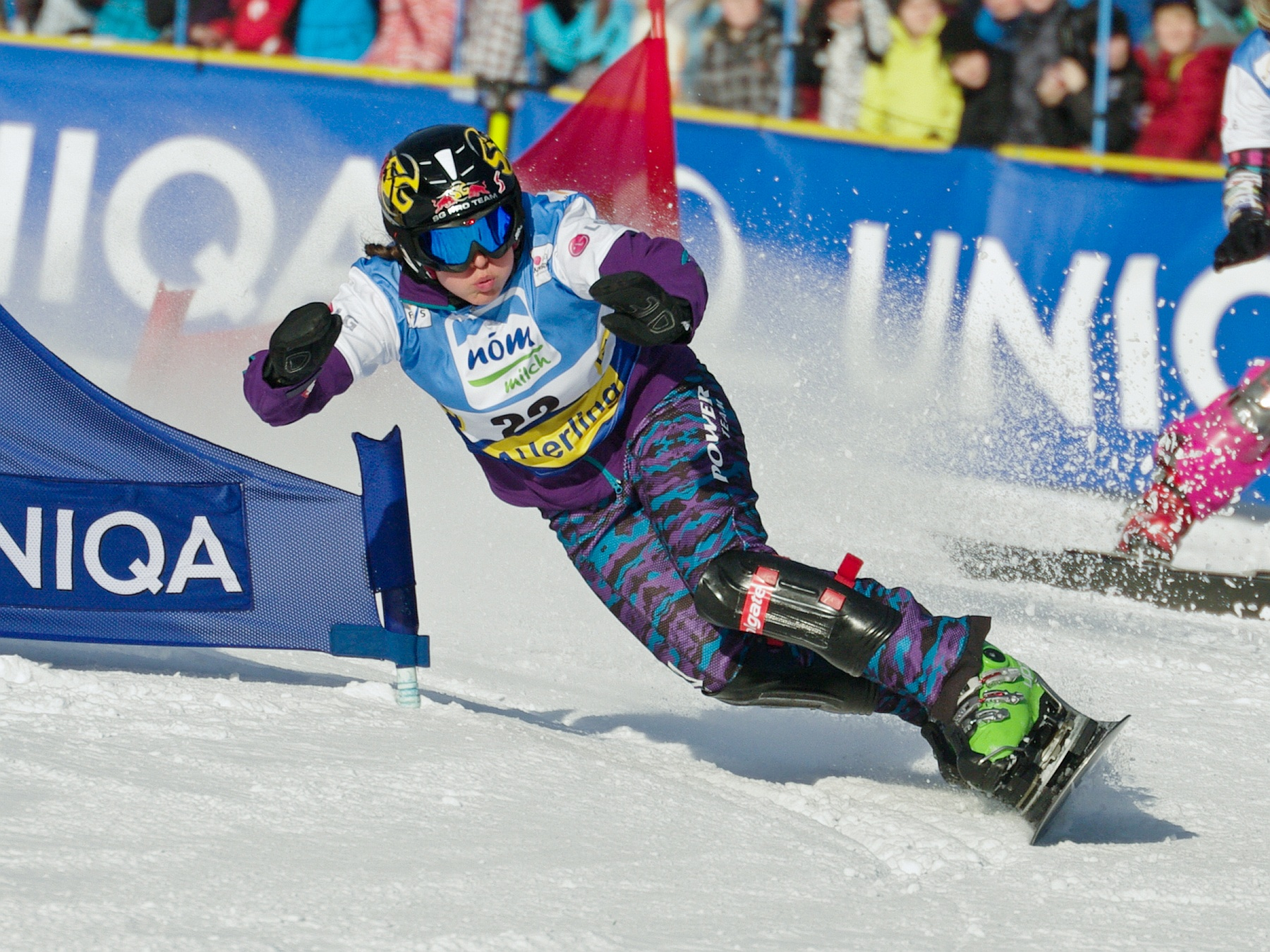
- Meschik in 2012

Personal information
- Born: 25 September 1990 (age 35) Sankt Veit an der Glan, Austria
- Height: 1.60 m (5 ft 3 in)
- Weight: 57 kg (126 lb)

Sport
- Country: Austria
- Sport: Snowboarding
- Event: Alpine
- Club: ASKÖ Landskron
- Coached by: Tom Weninger
Medal record
Junior World Championships
Silver medal – second place	2008 Valmalenco	Parallel giant slalom
Bronze medal – third place	2009 Nagano	Parallel giant slalom
Bronze medal – third place	2010 Otago	Parallel giant slalom

Ina Meschik (born 25 September 1990 in Sankt Veit an der Glan) is an Austrian alpine snowboarder. She represented her nation Austria in three editions of the Olympic Games (2010, 2014 and 2018), and eventually claimed a bronze medal in parallel giant slalom at the 2010 FIS Junior World Championships in Lake Wānaka, New Zealand and fourth-place finishes at the FIS World Cup series. Meschik is currently a member of ASKÖ Landskron Ski Club in Villach, under her personal coach Tom Weninger.

Meschik made her official debut, as a 19-year-old, at the 2010 Winter Olympics in Vancouver, where she finished sixth in the women's giant slalom, losing out to Germany's Anke Karstens in the classification final match by sixty-four hundredths of a second.

At the 2014 Winter Olympics in Sochi, Meschik qualified for two alpine snowboarding events (including the first ever women's parallel slalom) by achieving fourth-place finishes from the FIS World Cup series in Rogla, Slovenia, and in Carezza, Italy. In the women's giant slalom, Meschik improved her prior performance in Vancouver with a fourth-place finish, but narrowly missed the bronze medal by almost a full second behind host nation's Alena Zavarzina in their small final match. Three days later, in the inaugural women's slalom, Meschik did not match her stellar stint from the giant slalom, as she lost the quarterfinal match to Germany's Amelie Kober by a hundredth-second margin.

Meschik finished eighth in the women's parallel giant slalom event at the 2018 Winter Olympics in Pyeongchang.
