= 2012–13 FIS Snowboard World Cup =

International snowboarding competition

2012–13 Snowboarding World Cup
Winners
- Overall men's: Janne Korpi (FIN)
- Overall women's: Kelly Clark (USA)
- Parallel slalom men's: Andreas Prommegger (AUT)
- Parallel slalom women's: Patrizia Kummer (SUI)
- Snowboard cross men's: Alex Pullin (AUS)
- Snowboard cross women's: Dominique Maltais (CAN)
- Halfpipe men's: Scotty Lago (USA)
- Halfpipe women's: Kelly Clark (USA)
- Big Air men's: Seppe Smits (BEL)

Competitions
- Venues: 17
- Individual: 49
- Team: 3
- Cancelled: 6

The 2012–13 FIS Snowboard World Cup was a multi race tournament over a season for snowboarding. The season started on 28 August 2012 and ended on 27 March 2013. The World Cup was organised by the FIS which also runs world cups and championships in alpine skiing, cross-country skiing, ski jumping, Nordic combined, and freestyle skiing. The FIS Snowboarding World Cup consisted of the parallel slalom, snowboard cross and the halfpipe. The men's side of the world cup also consisted of a big air competition.

== Calendar ==
=== Men ===
==== Parallel Slalom ====
Date	Place	Classification	Winner	Second	Third	Report
21 December 2012	Carezza, Italy	Giant Slalom	Andreas Prommegger (AUT)	Lukas Mathies (AUT)	Vic Wild (RUS)	
11 January 2013	Bad Gastein, Austria	Slalom	Andreas Prommegger (AUT)	Roland Fischnaller (ITA)	Žan Košir (SLO)	
12 January 2013	Bad Gastein, Austria	Slalom	Žan Košir (SLO)	Roland Fischnaller (ITA)	Aaron March (ITA)	
2 February 2013	Sudelfeld, Germany	Giant Slalom	Cancelled			
8 February 2013	Rogla, Slovenia	Giant Slalom	Roland Fischnaller (ITA)	Žan Košir (SLO)	Sylvain Dufour (FRA)	
14 February 2013	Sochi, Russia	Giant Slalom	Andreas Prommegger (AUT)	Ingemar Walder (AUT)	Rok Flander (SLO)	
15 February 2013	Sochi, Russia	Slalom	Cancelled			
23 February 2013	Moscow, Russia	Slalom	Stanislav Detkov (RUS)	Nevin Galmarini (SUI)	Roland Fischnaller (ITA)	
10 March 2013	Arosa, Switzerland	Giant Slalom	Rok Marguč (SLO)	Matthew Morison (CAN)	Anton Unterkofler (AUT)	
16 March 2013	La Molina, Spain	Giant Slalom	Andreas Prommegger (AUT)	Siegfried Grabner (AUT)	Philipp Schoch (SUI)	
20 March 2013	Sierra Nevada, Spain	Giant Slalom	Cancelled			

==== Snowboard Cross ====
Date	Place	Winner	Second	Third	Report
7 December 2012	Montafon, Austria	Omar Visintin (ITA)	Markus Schairer (AUT)	Nick Baumgartner (USA)	
8 December 2012	Montafon, Austria (Team event)	Hagen Kearney (USA); Nate Holland (USA)	Luca Matteotti (ITA); Omar Visintin (ITA)	Alessandro Hämmerle (AUT); Markus Schairer (AUT)	
14 December 2012	Telluride, United States	Seth Wescott (USA)	Alex Pullin (AUS)	Christopher Robanske (CAN)	
15 December 2012	Telluride, United States (Team event)	Nate Holland (USA); Seth Wescott (USA)	Emanuel Perathoner (ITA); Tommaso Leoni (ITA)	Hanno Douschan (AUT); Michael Hämmerle (AUT)	
2 February 2013	Blue Mountain, Canada	Christopher Robanske (CAN)	Alex Pullin (AUS)	Nick Baumgartner (USA)	
17 February 2013	Sochi, Russia	Alessandro Hämmerle (AUT)	Alex Deibold (USA)	Markus Schairer (AUT)	
9 March 2013	Arosa, Switzerland	Alex Pullin (AUS)	Nate Holland (USA)	Lucas Eguibar (ESP)	
16 March 2013	Veysonnaz, Switzerland	Mateusz Ligocki (POL)	Alex Pullin (AUS)	Alessandro Hämmerle (AUT)	
17 March 2013	Veysonnaz, Switzerland (Team Event)	Christopher Robanske (CAN); Robert Fagan (CAN)	Nate Holland (USA); Nick Baumgartner (USA)	Jonathan Cheever (USA); Seth Wescott (USA)	
21 March 2013	Sierra Nevada, Spain	Pierre Vaultier (FRA)	Markus Schairer (AUT)	Omar Visintin (ITA)	

==== Half-pipe ====
Date	Place	Winner	Second	Third	Report
26 August 2012	Cardrona, New Zealand	Ryo Aono (JPN)	Shuhei Sato (JPN)	Yiwei Zhang (CHN)	
8 December 2012	Ruka, Finland	Cancelled			
12 January 2013	Copper Mountain, United States	Nathan Johnstone (AUS)	Luke Mitrani (USA)	Louie Vito (USA)	
2 February 2013	Park City, United States	Shaun White (USA)	Scotty Lago (USA)	Luke Mitrani (USA)	
14 February 2013	Sochi, Russia	Taku Hiraoka (JPN)	Yuri Podladchikov (SUI)	Scotty Lago (USA)	
27 March 2013	Sierra Nevada, Spain	Janne Korpi (FIN)	Ayumu Nedefuji (JPN)	Shuhei Sato (JPN)	

==== Slopestyle ====
Date	Place	Winner	Second	Third	Report
11 January 2013	Copper Mountain, United States	Charles Guldemond (USA)	Roope Tonteri (FIN)	Peetu Piiroinen (FIN)	
9 February 2013	Kongsberg, Norway	Cancelled			
11 February 2013	Sochi, Russia	Cancelled			
16 March 2013	Spindleruv Mlyn, Czech Republic	Torstein Horgmo (NOR)	Ståle Sandbech (NOR)	Sven Thorgren (SWE)	
26 March 2013	Sierra Nevada, Spain	Yuuki Kadono (JPN)	Maxence Parrot (CAN)	Billy Morgan (GBR)	

==== Big Air ====
Date	Place	Winner	Second	Third	Report
27 October 2012	(United Kingdom) London, Great Britain	Cancelled			
10 November 2012	Antwerp, Belgium	Seppe Smits (BEL)	Clemens Schattschneider (AUT)	Patrick Burgener (SUI)	
17 November 2012	Stockholm, Sweden	Cancelled			

=== Women ===
==== Parallel Slalom ====
Date	Place	Classification	Winner	Second	Third	Report
21 December 2012	Carezza, Italy	Giant Slalom	Tomoka Takeuchi (JPN)	Caroline Calve (CAN)	Anke Karstens (GER)	
11 January 2013	Bad Gastein, Austria	Slalom	Amelie Kober (GER)	Marion Kreiner (AUT)	Claudia Riegler (AUT)	
12 January 2013	Bad Gastein, Austria	Slalom	Patrizia Kummer (SUI)	Julia Dujmovits (AUT)	Svetlana Boldykova (RUS)	
2 February 2013	Sudelfeld, Germany	Giant Slalom	Cancelled			
8 February 2013	Rogla, Slovenia	Giant Slalom	Yekaterina Tudegesheva (RUS)	Nicolien Sauerbreij (NED)	Claudia Riegler (AUT)	
14 February 2013	Sochi, Russia	Giant Slalom	Marion Kreiner (AUT)	Amelie Kober (GER)	Ariane Lavigne (CAN)	
15 February 2013	Sochi, Russia	Slalom	Cancelled			
23 February 2013	Moscow, Russia	Slalom	Caroline Calve (CAN)	Aleksandra Krol (POL)	Yekaterina Tudegesheva (RUS)	
10 March 2013	Arosa, Switzerland	Giant Slalom	Hilde-Katrine Engeli (NOR)	Patrizia Kummer (SUI)	Caroline Calve (CAN)	
16 March 2013	La Molina, Spain	Giant Slalom	Anke Karstens (GER)	Marion Kreiner (AUT)	Patrizia Kummer (SUI)	
20 March 2013	Sierra Nevada, Spain	Giant Slalom	Cancelled			

==== Snowboard Cross ====
Date	Place	Winner	Second	Third	Report
7 December 2012	Montafon, Austria	Dominique Maltais (CAN)	Rafaella Brutto (ITA)	Belle Brockhoffe (AUT)	
8 December 2012	Montafon, Austria (Team event)	Maria Ramberger (AUT); Susanne Moll (AUT)	Claire Chapotot (FRA); Lorelei Schmitt (FRA)	Nelly Moenne Loccoz (FRA); Chloe Trespeuch (FRA)	
14 December 2012	Telluride, United States	Dominique Maltais (CAN)	Maëlle Ricker (CAN)	Alexandra Jekova (BUL)	
15 December 2012	Telluride, United States (Team event)	Dominique Maltais (CAN); Maëlle Ricker (CAN)	Simona Meiler (SUI); Emilie Aubry (SUI)	Raffaella Brutto (ITA); Michela Moioli (ITA)	
2 February 2013	Blue Mountain, Canada	Eva Samková (CZE)	Dominique Maltais (CAN)	Nelly Moenne Loccoz (FRA)	
17 February 2013	Sochi, Russia	Michela Moioli (ITA)	Nelly Moenne Loccoz (FRA)	Helene Olafsen (NOR)	
9 March 2013	Arosa, Switzerland	Dominique Maltais (CAN)	Michela Moioli (ITA)	Maëlle Ricker (CAN)	
16 March 2013	Veysonnaz, Switzerland	Nelly Moenne Loccoz (FRA)	Dominique Maltais (CAN)	Eva Samková (CZE)	
17 March 2013	Veysonnaz, Switzerland (Team Event)	Dominique Maltais (CAN); Maëlle Ricker (CAN)	Raffaella Brutto (ITA); Michela Moioli (ITA)	Callan Chythlook-Sifsof (USA); Faye Gullini (USA)	
21 March 2013	Sierra Nevada, Spain	Dominique Maltais (CAN)	Nelly Moenne Loccoz (FRA)	Maëlle Ricker (CAN)	

==== Half-pipe ====
Date	Place	Winner	Second	Third	Report
26 August 2012	Cardrona, New Zealand	Kelly Clark (USA)	Sophie Rodriguez (FRA)	Queralt Castellet (ESP)	
8 December 2012	Ruka, Finland	Cancelled			
12 January 2013	Copper Mountain, United States	Torah Bright (AUS)	Kelly Clark (USA)	Queralt Castellet (ESP)	
2 February 2013	Park City, United States	Liu Jiayu (CHN)	Arielle Gold (USA)	Kaitlyn Farrington (USA)	
14 February 2013	Sochi, Russia	Kelly Clark (USA)	Holly Crawford (AUS)	Sophie Rodriguez (FRA)	
27 March 2013	Sierra Nevada, Spain	Sophie Rodriguez (FRA)	Liu Jiayu (CHN)	Ursina Haller (SUI)	

==== Slopestyle ====
Date	Place	Winner	Second	Third	Report
11 January 2013	Copper Mountain, United States	Jamie Anderson (USA)	Kjersti Buaas (NOR)	Isabel Derungs (SUI)	
9 February 2013	Kongsberg, Norway	Cancelled			
11 February 2013	Sochi, Russia	Cancelled			
16 March 2013	Spindleruv Mlyn, Czech Republic	Enni Rukajärvi (FIN)	Sina Candrian (SUI)	Kjersti Buaas (NOR)	
26 March 2013	Sierra Nevada, Spain	Cancelled			

== Standings ==
=== Freestyle Overall Men ===
Pos	Athlete	Points
1.	Janne Korpi (FIN)	2360
2.	Scotty Lago (USA)	1960
3.	Zhang Yiwei (CHN)	1900
4.	Shuhei Sato (JPN)	1620
5.	Maxence Parrot (CAN)	1600

=== Freestyle Overall Women ===
Pos	Athlete	Points
1.	Kelly Clark (USA)	3200
2.	Liu Jiayu (CHN)	2660
3.	Sophie Rodriguez (FRA)	2600
4.	Kaitlyn Farrington (USA)	1820
5.	Queralt Castellet (ESP)	1780

=== Parallel Men ===
Pos	Athlete	Points
1.	Andreas Prommegger (AUT)	4660
1.	Roland Fichnaller (ITA)	3990
3.	Žan Košir (SLO)	3410
4.	Ingemar Walder (AUT)	2440
5.	Nevin Galmarini (SUI)	2330

=== Parallel Women ===
Pos	Athlete	Points
1.	Patrizia Kummer (SUI)	3750
2.	Marion Kreiner (AUT)	3580
3.	Caroline Calve (CAN)	3370
4.	Yekaterina Tudegesheva (RUS)	3000
5.	Amelie Kober (GER)	2720

=== Snowboard Cross Men ===
Pos	Athlete	Points
1.	Alex Pullin (AUS)	4550
2.	Markus Schairer (AUT)	3500
3.	Omar Visintin (ITA)	2880
4.	Alessandro Hämmerle (AUT)	2692
5.	Nick Baumgartner (USA)	2520

=== Snowboard Cross Women ===
Pos	Athlete	Points
1.	Dominique Maltais (CAN)	5600
2.	Nelly Moenne Loccoz (FRA)	4150
3.	Michela Moioli (ITA)	3170
4.	Maëlle Ricker (CAN)	2960
4.	Eva Samková (CZE)	2960

=== Halfpipe Men ===
Pos	Athlete	Points
1.	Scotty Lago (USA)	1960
2.	Zhang Yiwei (CHN)	1900
3.	Shuhei Sato (JPN)	1620
4.	Luke Mitrani (USA)	1500
5.	Nathan Johnstone (AUS)	1480

=== Halfpipe Women ===
Pos	Athlete	Points
1.	Kelly Clark (USA)	3200
2.	Liu Jiayu (CHN)	2660
3.	Sophie Rodriguez (FRA)	2600
4.	Kaitlyn Farrington (USA)	1820
5.	Queralt Castellet (ESP)	1780

=== Slopestyle Men ===
Pos	Athlete	Points
1.	Yuuki Kadono (JPN)	1400
2.	Sven Thorgren (SWE)	1250
3.	Torstein Horgmo (NOR)	1220
4.	Maxence Parrot (CAN)	1200
5.	Ståle Sandbech (NOR)	1120

=== Slopestyle Women ===
Pos	Athlete	Points
1.	Kjersti Buaas (NOR)	1400
2.	Jamie Anderson (USA)	1000
2.	Enni Rukajärvi (FIN)	1000
4.	Sina Candrian (SUI)	815
5.	Šárka Pančochová (CZE)	720
5.	Silje Norendal (NOR)	720

=== Big Air Men ===
Pos	Athlete	Points
1.	Seppe Smits (BEL)	1000
2.	Clemens Schattschneider (AUT)	800
3.	Patrick Burgener (SUI)	600
4.	Roope Tonteri (FIN)	500
5.	Janne Korpi (FIN)	450

== Medal table ==
Rank	Nation	Gold	Silver	Bronze	Total
1	Canada	9	6	5	20
2	United States	8	7	8	23
3	Austria	7	9	8	24
4	Japan	4	2	1	7
5	Italy	3	7	4	14
6	France	3	4	4	11
7	Australia	3	4	0	7
8	Norway	2	2	2	6
9	Slovenia	2	1	2	5
10	Finland	2	1	1	4
10	Germany	2	1	1	4
12	Russia	2	0	3	5
13	Switzerland	1	5	5	11
14	China	1	1	1	3
15	Poland	1	1	0	2
16	Czech Republic	1	0	1	2
17	Belgium	1	0	0	1
18	Netherlands	0	1	0	1
19	Spain	0	0	3	3
20	Bulgaria	0	0	1	1
20	Great Britain	0	0	1	1
20	Sweden	0	0	1	1
Totals (22 entries)		52	52	52	156
