= 2012–13 in skiing =

From August 22, 2012 to March 27, 2013, the following skiing events took place at various locations around the world.

== Alpine skiing ==
- October 27, 2012 – March 17, 2013: FIS World Cup
  - Men's combined overall winners: both (Croatia) Ivica Kostelić and (France) Alexis Pinturault were tied for first place.
  - Men's downhill overall winner: (Norway) Aksel Lund Svindal.
  - Men's giant slalom overall winner: (United States) Ted Ligety.
  - Men's slalom overall winner: (Austria) Marcel Hirscher.
  - Men's Super G overall winner: (Norway) Aksel Lund Svindal.
  - Women's combined overall winner: (Slovenia) Tina Maze.
  - Women's downhill overall winner: (United States) Lindsey Vonn.
  - Women's giant slalom overall winner: (Slovenia) Tina Maze.
  - Women's slalom overall winner: (United States) Mikaela Shiffrin.
  - Women's Super G overall winner: (Slovenia) Tina Maze.
  - Ladies overall champion: (Slovenia) Tina Maze (first title).
  - Men's overall champion: (Austria) Marcel Hirscher (second consecutive title).
- 4–17 February: FIS Alpine World Ski Championships 2013 in Schladming, Austria
  - United States won the gold medal count; Austria won the overall medal count.

== Biathlon ==
- 25 November 2012 – 17 March 2013: Biathlon World Cup
  - Norway is the winner of both gold and overall medal counts for this World Cup of events.
- 7–17 February: The Biathlon World Championships 2013 was held at Nové Město na Moravě, Czech Republic.
  - Norway was the gold medal and overall medal counts winner.

== Freestyle skiing ==
- August 22, 2012 – March 25, 2013: 2012–13 FIS Freestyle Skiing World Cup
  - Men's aerials overall winner: (China) Jia Zongyang
  - Men's halfpipe overall winner: (Canada) Mike Riddle
  - Men's moguls overall winner: (Canada) Mikaël Kingsbury
  - Men's skicross overall winner: (Switzerland) Alex Fiva
  - Men's slopestyle overall winner: (United Kingdom) James Woods
  - Women's aerials overall winner: (China) Xu Mengtao
  - Women's halfpipe overall winner: (Switzerland) Virginie Faivre
  - Women's moguls overall winner: (United States) Hannah Kearney
  - Women's skicross overall winner: (Switzerland) Fanny Smith
  - Women's slopestyle overall winner: (United States) Keri Herman
    - Men's total overall winner: (Canada) Mikaël Kingsbury (first title).
    - Women's total overall winner: (China) Xu Mengtao (first title).
- March 5 – 10: The FIS Freestyle World Ski Championships 2013 took place at Voss, Norway
  - Canada won the gold medal count; it tied with the United States for the overall medal count.

== Nordic skiing ==
- 23 November 2012 – 24 March 2013: FIS Ski Jumping World Cup
  - Ladies: Sara Takanashi (JPN). First overall title.
  - Men: Gregor Schlierenzauer (AUT). Second overall title.
- 24 November 2012 – 16 March 2013: FIS Nordic Combined World Cup
  - Men: Eric Frenzel (GER). First overall title.
- 24 November 2012 – 24 March 2013: Fis Cross-Country World Cup
  - Men: Petter Northug (NOR). Second overall title.
  - Ladies: Justyna Kowalczyk (POL). Fourth overall title.
- 20 February – 3 March: FIS Nordic World Ski Championships 2013 in Val di Fiemme, Italy
  - Norway topped the gold and overall medals tally.

== Snowboarding ==
- August 28, 2012 – March 27, 2013: 2012–13 FIS Snowboard World Cup
  - Men's Big Air overall winner: (Belgium) Seppe Smits.
  - Men's halfpipe overall winner: (United States) Scotty Lago.
  - Men's parallel slalom overall winner: (Austria) Andreas Prommegger.
  - Men's slopestyle overall winner: (Japan) Yuuki Kadano.
  - Men's snowboard cross overall winner: (Australia) Alex Pullin.
  - Women's halfpipe overall winner: (United States) Kelly Clark.
  - Women's parallel slalom overall winner: (Switzerland) Patrizia Kummer.
  - Women's slopestyle overall winner: (Norway) Kjersti Buaas.
  - Women's snowboard cross overall winner: (Canada) Dominique Maltais.
    - Men's total overall winner: (Finland) Janne Korpi (first title).
    - Women's total overall winner: (United States) Kelly Clark (first title).
- 18–27 January: The FIS Snowboarding World Championships 2013 took place at the Stoneham Mountain Resort, in Stoneham-et-Tewkesbury, Quebec, Canada
  - Canada and Finland both tied in the gold and overall medal tallies. However, Canada takes first place because of the team's two silver medals won; Finland has two bronze medals instead.
