= Alena Zavarzina =

Russian snowboarder (born 1989)

Alena Zavarzina Алёна Заварзина
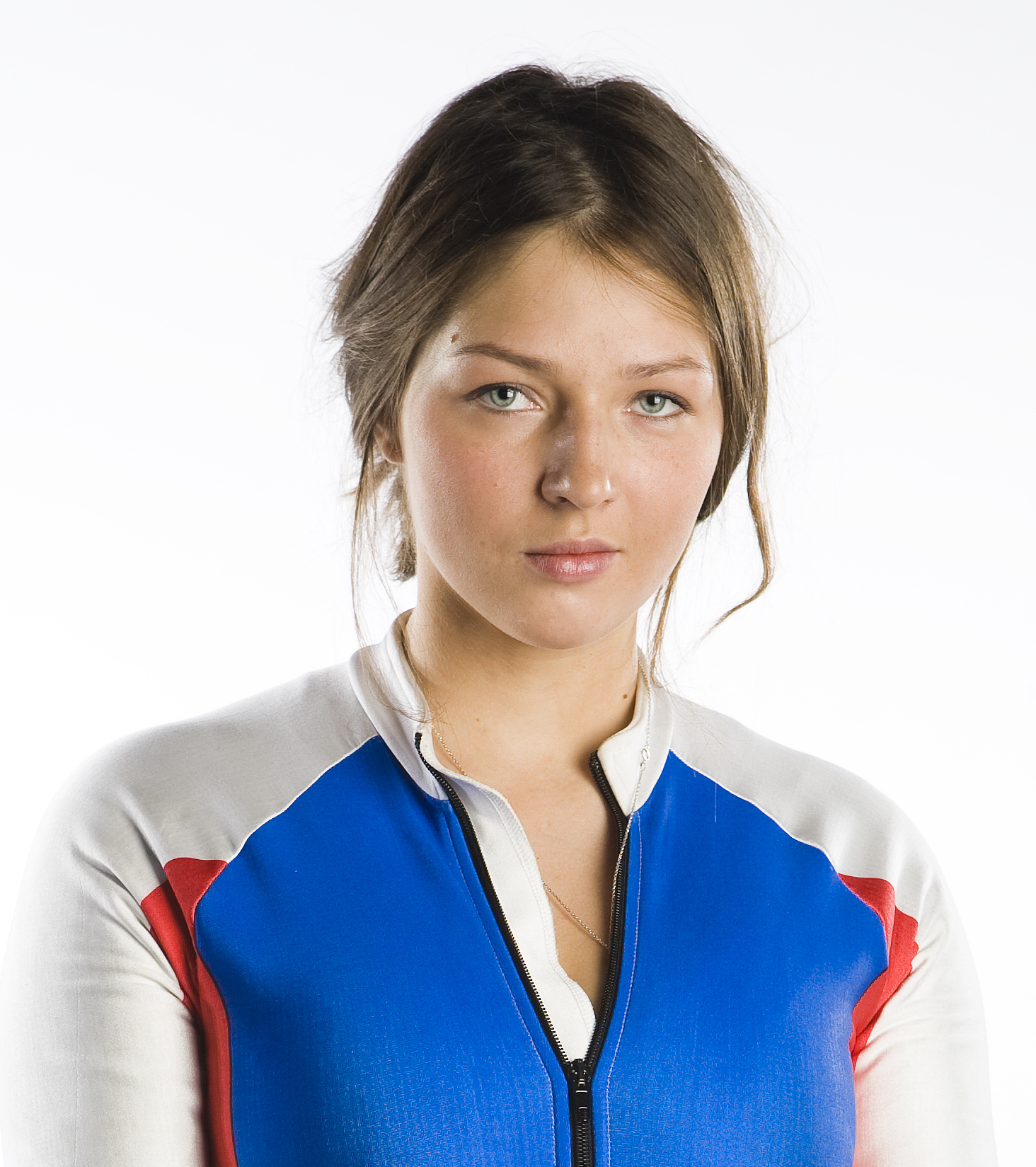
- Zavarzina in 2009

Personal information
- Full name: Alena Igorevna Zavarzina
- Nickname: Superzina
- Nationality: Russian
- Born: 27 May 1989 (age 37) Novosibirsk, Russian SFSR, Soviet Union
- Height: 1.77 m (5 ft 10 in)
- Weight: 66 kg (146 lb)
- Website: alenazavarzina.com

Sport
- Country: Russia
- Sport: Snowboarding
- Events: Parallel slalom, parallel giant slalom
- Club: Krasnoyarsk Academy of Winter Sports
- Coached by: Denis Tikhomirov
- Retired: 31 August 2018 (age 29)

Achievements and titles
- Olympic finals: Bronze medal in parallel giant slalom at Sochi 2014
- World finals: Gold medal in parallel giant slalom at La Molina 2011; Silver medal in parallel giant slalom at Kreischberg 2015; Bronze medal in parallel slalom at Sierra Nevada 2017
- Highest world ranking: 1st in Parallel Giant Slalom World Cup (2017); 2nd in Parallel World Cup (2017)
Medal record
Women's snowboarding
Representing Russia
International snowboarding competitions
Event	1st	2nd	3rd
Olympic Games	0	0	1
World Championships	1	1	1
Junior World Championships	0	1	1
Total	1	2	3
World Cup
Event	1st	2nd	3rd
Parallel Slalom	1	1	3
Parallel Giant Slalom	3	3	2
Total	4	4	5
Olympic Games
Bronze medal – third place	2014 Sochi	Parallel giant slalom
World Championships
Gold medal – first place	2011 La Molina	Parallel giant slalom
Silver medal – second place	2015 Kreischberg	Parallel giant slalom
Bronze medal – third place	2017 Sierra Nevada	Parallel slalom
Junior World Championships
Silver medal – second place	2009 Nagano	Parallel slalom
Bronze medal – third place	2008 Valmalenco	Parallel giant slalom

Alena Igorevna Zavarzina (Russian: Алёна Игоревна Заварзина; born 27 May 1989) is a Russian former snowboarder specializing in parallel slalom and parallel giant slalom disciplines. She is the 2011 World champion and bronze medalist from the 2014 Winter Olympics in parallel giant slalom. A four-time World Cup race winner, Zavarzina won the parallel giant slalom crystal globe in 2016/17 World Cup season and was the runner-up in the seasonal parallel overall standings. Apart from her World title in 2011, she earned further one silver and one bronze medal at the FIS Snowboarding World Championships in her career.

== Career ==
Zavarzina started snowboarding at the age of 10 in her hometown Novosibirsk. She was participating in big air competitions before switching to the alpine snowboarding. She made her first appearance in National Championships as an 11-year-old, in 2000.

=== Early years: Europa Cup success ===
Zavarzina made her World Cup debut on 23 October 2006 in a parallel slalom race in Landgraaf where she finished in 31st place and scored her first World Cup points. It was her only World Cup start of the season and she mainly participated in Europa Cup for the next couple of seasons. She won three Europa Cup races during the 2007/08 season and placed third in the overall rankings. She won a bronze medal in parallel giant slalom at the 2008 Junior World Championships in Valmalenco. In the following season, despite managing only one victory in Europa Cup, Zavarzina reached the podium five times and finished the season as the runner-up in the overall standings. With that promising performances in the Europa Cup, Zavarzina was given a spot in the parallel giant slalom race at the 2009 World Championships in Gangwon, but she was unable to qualify for the elimination round after finishing 21st in qualification. At the 2009 Junior World Championships in Nagano, she won a silver medal in parallel slalom, the discipline that she made only one podium in her Europa Cup career. She made four appearances in the World Cup during the 2008/09 season but passed the qualification round only once, in Landgraaf where she made her World Cup debut.

=== 2009–2011: Breakthrough and World Championship title ===
Zavarzina became a regular World Cup competitor in 2009/10 season. She won her first World Cup victory in a parallel giant slalom race in Telluride, Colorado which was also her first World Cup podium. She reached a podium one more time during the season with a runner-up finish in Stoneham, Canada and finished the season in eighth-place in the parallel overall rankings. At the 2010 Winter Olympics in Vancouver, Zavarzina made the 17th quickest time in the qualification round and missed out to advance for the elimination round by seven hundredths of a second as a fastest loser while her teammate Yekaterina Ilyukhina winning the silver medal.

Zavarzina started 2010/11 season in very good form with two podiums from her first two races. By doing so, she reached a podium in a parallel slalom race for the first time in her career and became the part of the Russian podium sweep in Limone Piemonte, the first ever in the history of the Parallel World Cup. At the 2011 World Championships in La Molina, Zavarzina won the gold medal in the parallel giant slalom and became the second ever Russian snowboarder to claim a World title after Yekaterina Tudegesheva who won the gold medal, also in parallel giant slalom, in 2007. In the parallel slalom event, Zavarzina tore ligaments in her right knee and sustained a season-ending injury during the qualification round after setting the fastest time in the first run of the qualification in blue course. After her success in World Championships, Zavarzina was awarded the title of Honoured Master of Sports of Russia.

=== 2011–2014: Injury comeback and Olympic bronze medal ===
After returning from the injury, Zavarzina struggled to regain her form throughout the 2011/12 season, her eighth-place finish in Telluride was her best performance of the season. In the following season, her results started to improve. Although she did not manage to reach World Cup podium during the season, she made a couple of fourth-place finishes in Bad Gastein and Arosa. At the 2013 World Championships in Stoneham, Zavarzina was unable to defend her World title and eliminated in the quarter-finals in the parallel giant slalom event. In the parallel slalom, she was knocked out from the competition in the first elimination round.

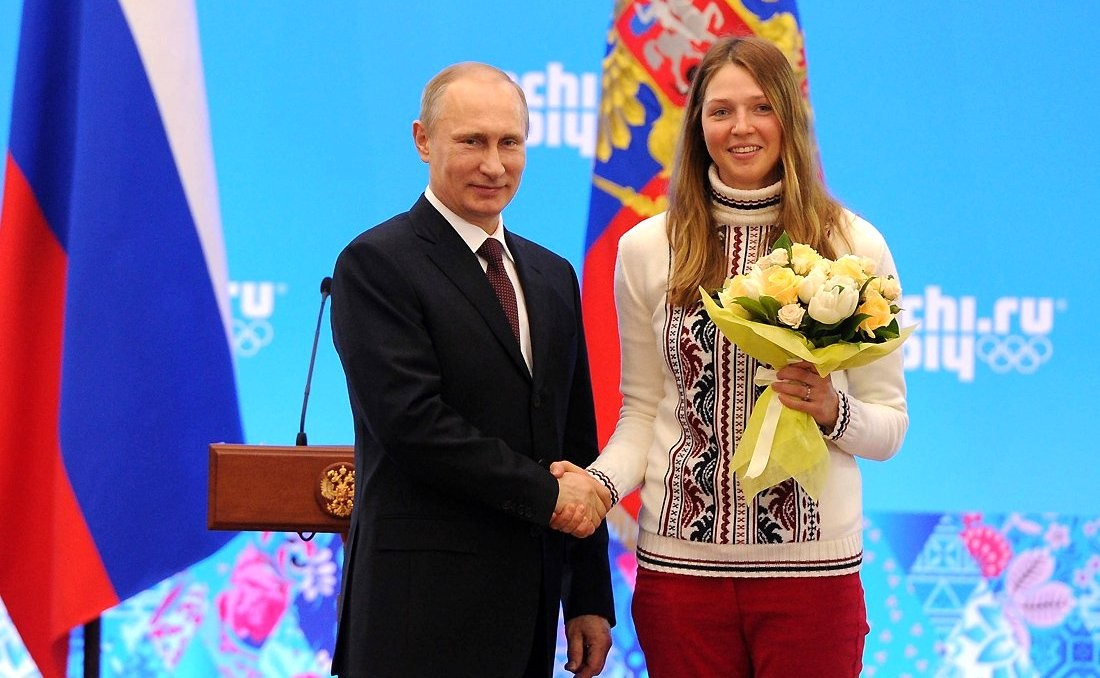
Zavarzina with Vladimir Putin after the 2014 Winter Olympics in Sochi.

Zavarzina has not started well to 2013/14 season and failed to pass the qualification round in her first three World Cup races. During the parallel slalom race in Bad Gastein on 12 January 2014, a month before the Olympics was due to begin, she took a heavy fall and broke her left arm. She competed with a brace on her left arm at the 2014 Winter Olympics in Sochi and won a bronze medal in the parallel giant slalom, just a few minutes before her husband Vic Wild claimed the gold medal in the same discipline. This was only the second time a husband and wife had won medals in the same event at the Olympic Winter Games. Three days later in the inaugural Olympic parallel slalom, she was eliminated in the 1/8 finals by the eventual champion Julia Dujmovits and placed thirteenth while her husband went on to win the gold medal in the men's event. After the Olympics, Zavarzina received the Order "For Merit to the Fatherland" (second class) for "her great contribution to the development of physical culture and sports, with high sporting achievements at the 2014 Winter Olympic Games in Sochi".

=== 2014–2017: World Championship medals and first World Cup title ===
After more than four years without a podium in World Cup level, Zavarzina returned to the World Cup podium with a third-place finish in the parallel slalom race in Montafon at the beginning of the 2014/15 season. At the 2015 World Championships in Kreischberg, she won a silver medal in parallel giant slalom after losing to Claudia Riegler in the repeat of the 2011 final, and finished fifth in the parallel slalom. She reached her second World Cup podium of the season at the season finale in Winterberg, and finished the season in thirteenth place in the overall World Cup standings.

In 2015/16 season, Zavarzina won her second career World Cup victory, this time in parallel slalom, in Winterberg which was also her sole World Cup podium of the season. At the end of the season she finished eighth in the overall rankings, her highest since 2009/10 season.

Zavarzina's best season in terms of World Cup results came in the 2016/17 season. She won two World Cup parallel giant slalom races in Bansko and Bokwang, the latter was also the test event for the upcoming Winter Olympic Games, and grabbed one more podium spot in the same discipline with a third place-finish in the season-opener in Carezza. Although her podiums came in parallel giant slalom, she won a bronze medal in the parallel slalom at the 2017 World Championships in Sierra Nevada which was her first senior medal in this discipline. With this medal, Zavarzina completed the full set of medals (gold, silver and bronze) from the World Championships. In the parallel giant slalom event, Zavarzina set the second fastest time in the qualification round but lost to her teammate Yekaterina Tudegesheva in the quarter-finals. At the end of the season, Zavarzina clinched the parallel giant slalom crystal globe for the first time in her career. She was also leading the parallel overall World Cup standings by a slim margin over Ester Ledecká prior to the season finale in Winterberg, but Ledecká finished as the runner-up in the last race of the season while Zavarzina was seventh and claimed the overall crystal globe ahead of Zavarzina.

=== 2017–2018: Third Winter Olympics and retirement ===
Zavarzina opened the 2017/18 season with a promising fourth-place finish in the first race of the season in Carezza, but she had a poor run of results in the following World Cup races. She reached her first podium of the season in Rogla in the parallel giant slalom race through the end of January. She backed that up with another fourth-place finish in the same discipline in Bansko, the last World Cup stage before the Olympic Games.

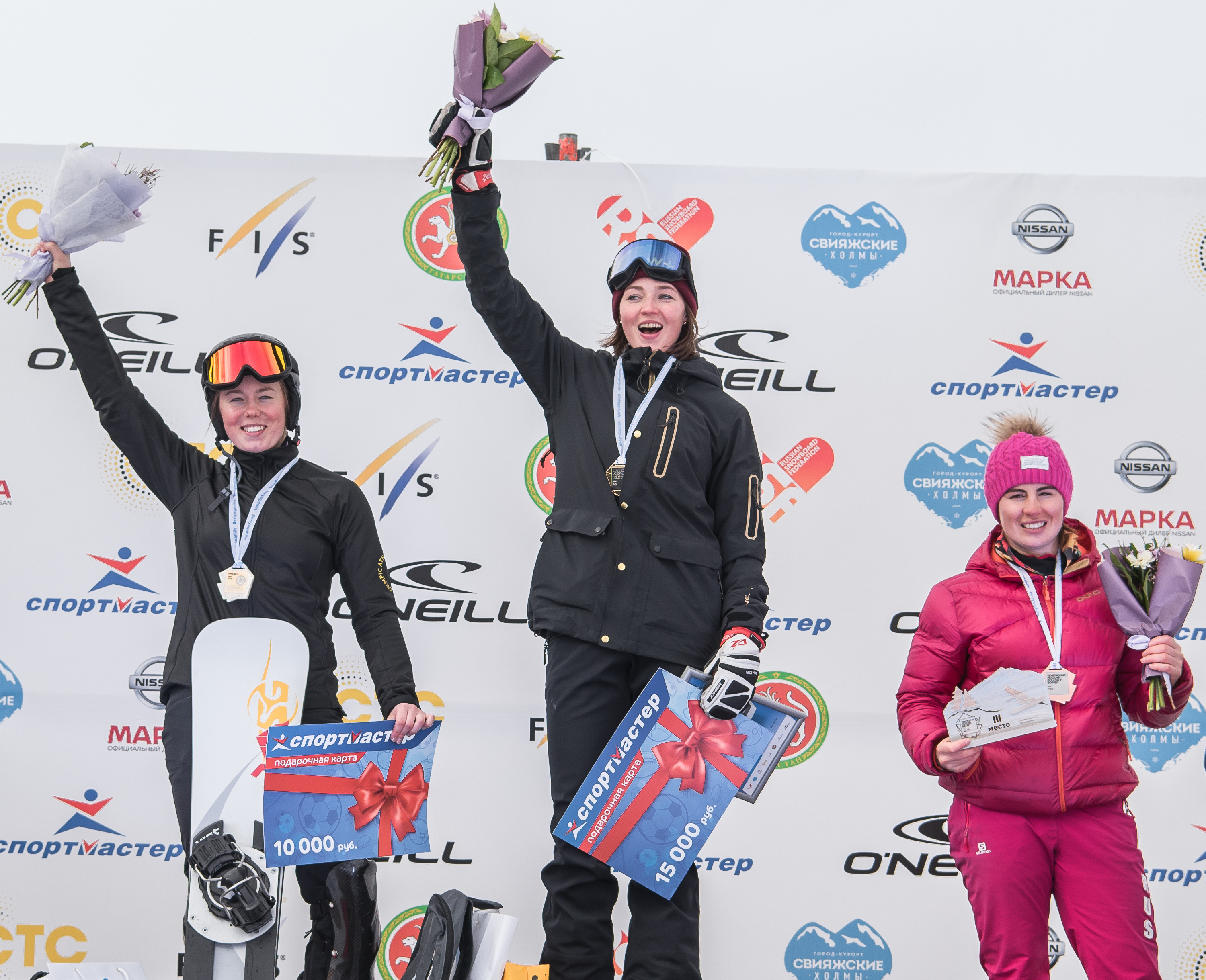
Zavarzina at the podium ceremony after winning the gold medal at the 2018 Russian Championships, her last official competition.

Zavarzina was one of the numerous Russian athletes that were permitted by the IOC to participate at the 2018 Winter Olympics in Pyeongchang under the neutral flag after the country's state-sponsored doping program was exposed. She said that in the course of preparation for the Olympics she had to sign a lot of "unpleasant papers" and claimed that "unequal conditions" have been created for Russian athletes. At the Olympics, she qualified for the main round in the parallel giant slalom by setting the second fastest time in qualification but missed the medals after falling in both semi final and bronze medal final and finished in fourth-place. She told in an interview that during her time in Pyeongchang, she has taken three doping tests in the early hours of the morning in the period of one week.

After the Olympics, Zavarzina skipped the World Cup event in Kayseri, stating that the Parallel Giant Slalom title is already out of her reach and she need to recover herself after the Games. She returned to World Cup podium in Scuol with a runner-up finish in parallel giant slalom, losing to Ledecká by 0.02 seconds in the final. She was also second in the last race of the season, parallel slalom in Winterberg, and finished the season in sixth-place in the overall World Cup standings.

On 31 August 2018, Zavarzina announced her retirement with a written manifesto which was published on the website of Match TV in which she explained her reasons for retirement. She confirmed that she has not been paid a salary since 2017 and stated that she will not receive a presidential scholarship for her results in 2017 and 2018, as well as funding for 2019 unless she undergo the in-depth medical examination and pass. She added that passing this medical examination is impossible for her since her medical condition is no longer suitable for sports due to the tightening of the rules by the FMBA (Federal Medical-Biological Agency), although her condition have remained unchanged in the last two years. She said that she was in exactly the same situation last year and still went to the Olympics although according to the rules she did not have the right to be in the Russian national team. She also criticized the Russian Ministry of Sports and Russian Snowboard Federation for their lack of support for the sport and empty promises through the years.

== Personal life ==
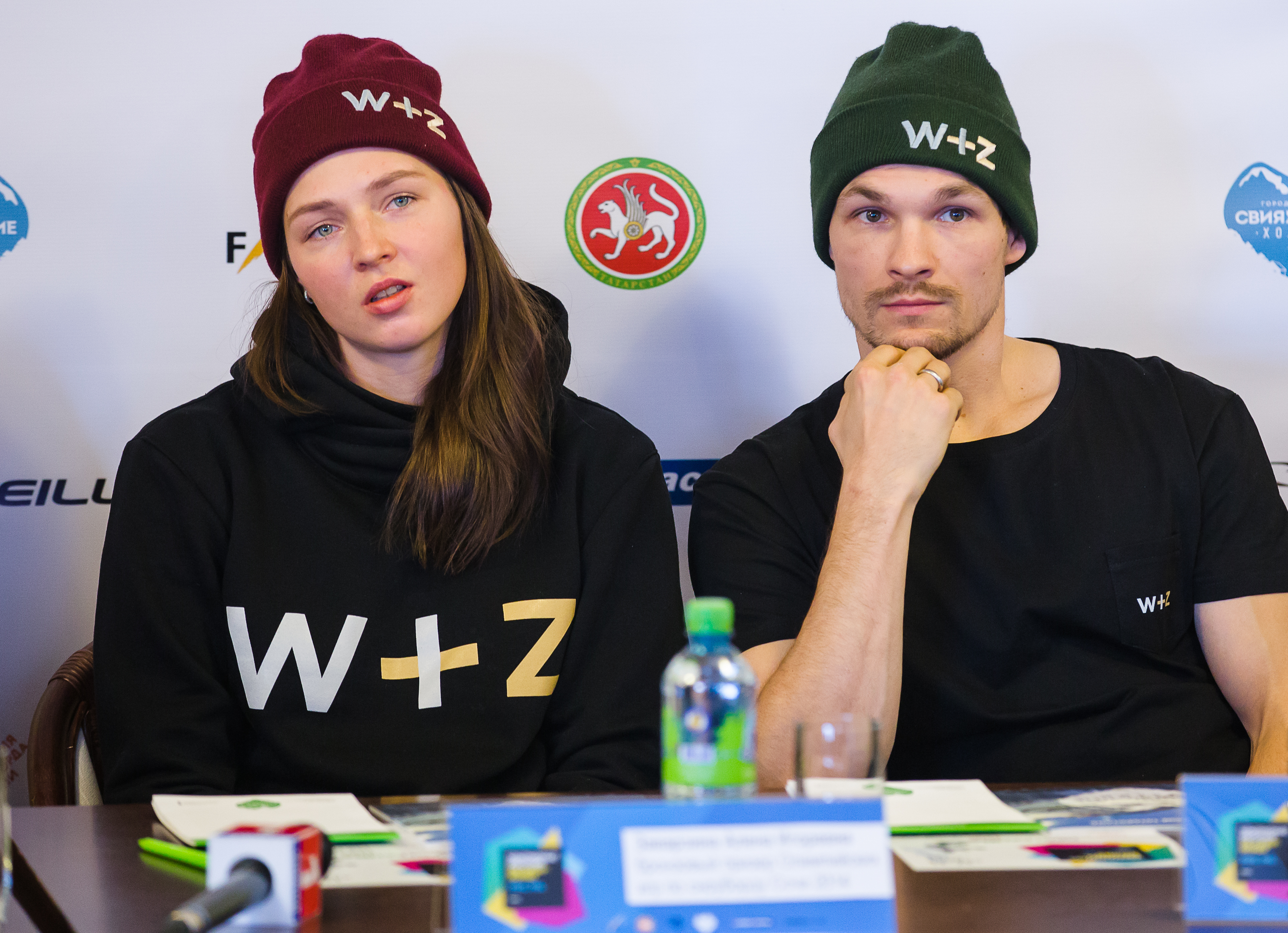
Zavarzina and Vic Wild in 2017.

Zavarzina was born in Novosibirsk. She studied visual arts in the Novosibirsk branch of the Moscow State Pedagogical University before transferring to the Moscow branch of the university. She graduated from the management department of the Moscow Technological Institute in 2017. After her retirement from competitive snowboarding, Zavarzina entered Central Saint Martins College of Arts and Design with the aim of becoming an art director. She graduated from Saint Martins in 2022.

Zavarzina married with the future double Olympic champion Vic Wild in the summer of 2011, a former member of the U.S. snowboarding team who has competed for Russia after receiving a Russian citizenship in 2012. Prior to the Winter Olympics in Sochi, she and her husband signed a contract with Petrodvorets Watch Factory, the manufacturer of the Raketa watches. She has become the face of the company's advertising campaign and a member of the board of directors while her husband was appointed a strategic director of the factory. In December 2021, Zavarzina announced their divorce on her Instagram page and thanked Wild for "10 wonderful years". Despite the break-up they continue to be in good terms with each other, Zavarzina designs snowboards for Wild's company which is launched in 2024.

Zavarzina is the brand ambassador for Toyota Russia, Tag Heuer, S7 Airlines and Zasport, the official outfitter of the Russian Olympic team. On 28 May 2017, she was appointed to the International Ski Federation (FIS) Athletes' Commission as an elected member for a two-year term. She's also one of the ambassadors of the 2019 Winter Universiade which was held in Krasnoyarsk in March 2019.

In 2021, Zavarzina released an autobiographical book, titled "Unsportsmanlike Conduct: How to Fail Without Screwing Up", published by AST in Russian. In her spare time, she likes to photograph and paint.

== World Cup results ==
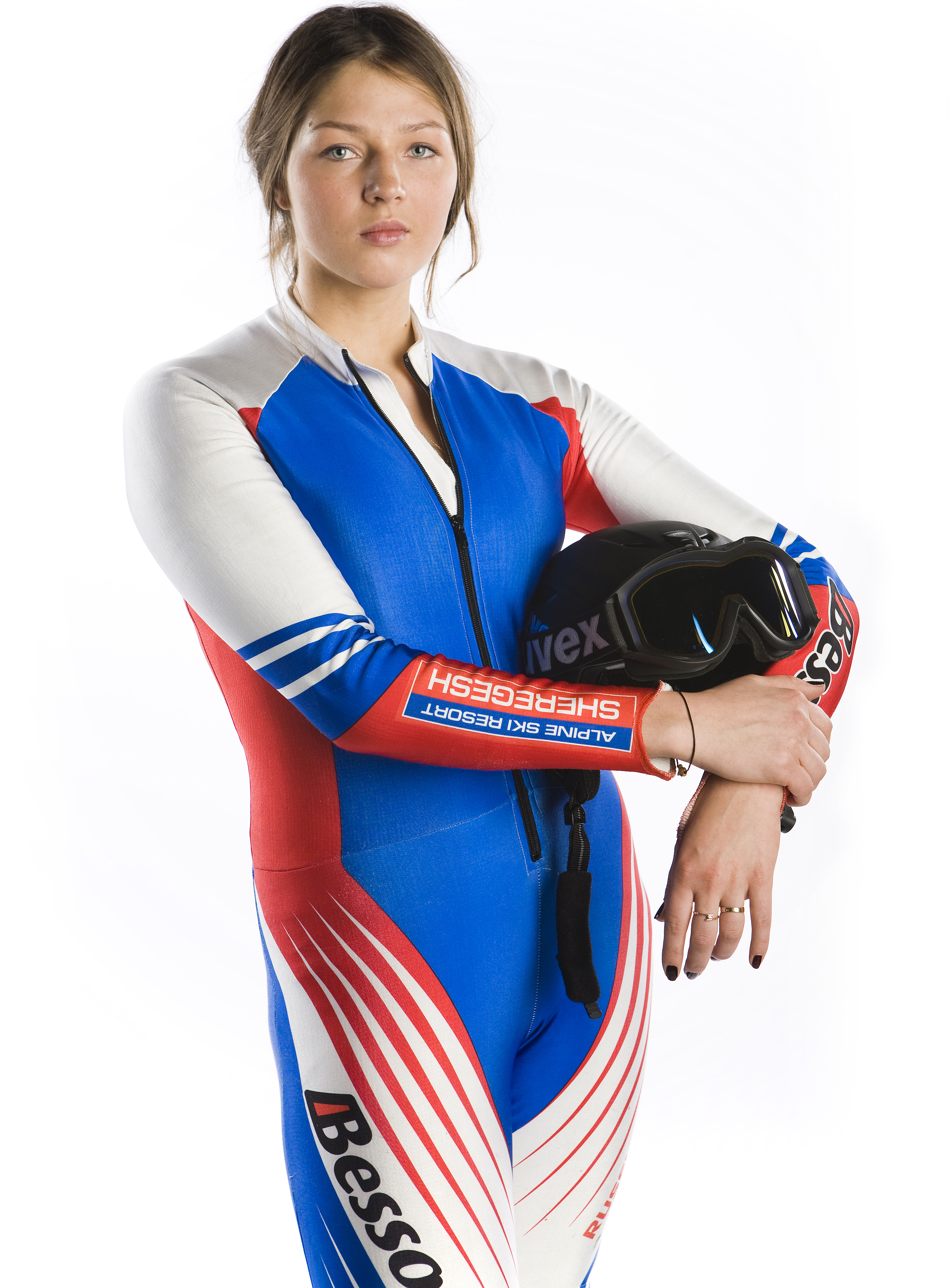
Zavarzina in 2009.

All results are sourced from the International Ski Federation (FIS).

=== Season titles ===
- 1 titles – (1 parallel giant slalom)

Season
Season	Discipline
2017	Parallel Giant Slalom

=== Season standings ===
Season	Age	Parallel Overall	Parallel Slalom	Parallel Giant Slalom
2007	17	59	—N/a	—N/a
2008	18	did not compete		
2009	19	53	—N/a	—N/a
2010	20	8	—N/a	—N/a
2011	21	11	—N/a	—N/a
2012	22	17	—N/a	—N/a
2013	23	12	10	14
2014	24	35	43	26
2015	25	13	9	20
2016	26	8	6	13
2017	27	2	14	1
2018	28	6	6	5

=== Race podiums ===
- 4 wins – (1 PSL, 3 PGS)
- 13 podiums – (5 PSL, 8 PGS)

No.	Season	Date	Location	Discipline	Place
1	2009–10	17 December 2009	Telluride, United States	Parallel Giant Slalom	1st
2	2009–10	24 January 2010	Stoneham, Canada	Parallel Giant Slalom	2nd
3	2010–11	10 October 2010	Landgraaf, Netherlands	Parallel Slalom	3rd
4	2010–11	10 December 2010	Limone Piemonte, Italy	Parallel Giant Slalom	2nd
5	2014–15	18 December 2014	Montafon, Austria	Parallel Slalom	3rd
6	2014–15	14 March 2015	Winterberg, Germany	Parallel Slalom	3rd
7	2015–16	6 March 2016	Winterberg, Germany	Parallel Slalom	1st
8	2016–17	15 December 2016	Carezza, Italy	Parallel Giant Slalom	3rd
9	2016–17	5 February 2017	Bansko, Bulgaria	Parallel Giant Slalom	1st
10	2016–17	12 February 2017	Bogwang, South Korea	Parallel Giant Slalom	1st
11	2017–18	21 January 2018	Rogla, Slovenia	Parallel Giant Slalom	3rd
12	2017–18	10 March 2018	Scuol, Switzerland	Parallel Giant Slalom	2nd
13	2017–18	17 March 2018	Winterberg, Germany	Parallel Slalom	2nd

== Olympic results ==
- 1 medal – (1 bronze)

Year	Age	Parallel Slalom	Parallel Giant Slalom
(Canada) 2010 Vancouver	20	—N/a	17
(Russia) 2014 Sochi	24	13	3
(South Korea) 2018 Pyeongchang	28	—N/a	4

== World Championships results ==
- 3 medals – (1 gold, 1 silver, 1 bronze)

Year	Age	Parallel Slalom	Parallel Giant Slalom
(South Korea) 2009 Gangwon	19	—	21
(Spain) 2011 La Molina	21	32	1
(Canada) 2013 Stoneham	23	9	5
(Austria) 2015 Kreischberg	25	5	2
(Spain) 2017 Sierra Nevada	27	3	5

== Bibliography ==
- 2021: Unsportsmanlike Conduct: How to Fail Without Screwing Up (Russian: Неспортивное поведение. Как потерпеть неудачу и не облажаться), AST, ISBN 978-5-17-106076-3.
