= Valeriya Tsoy =

Valeria Tsoy
Personal information
- Full name: Valeriya Tsoy
- Born: 8 July 1988 (age 38) Oskemen, Kazakh SSR, Soviet Union

Sport
- Sport: Snowboarding

Valeriya Tsoy (Валерия Львовна Цой, born 8 July 1988 in Oskemen) is an Olympic snowboarder, author and public speaker. In 2014, she became the first snowboarder to represent Kazakhstan in the Winter Olympics.

Tsoy competed at the 2014 Winter Olympics for Kazakhstan. She was 23rd in the qualifying run of the parallel giant slalom and 32nd in the qualifying of the parallel slalom,

Tsoy made her World Cup debut in March 2011. Her best finish is 4th, in a parallel giant slalom at Sochi in 2012–13. Her best overall finish is 12th, in 2013–14.

Valeriya was published in numerous magazines, including Men's Health and Harper's Bazaar.

She modelled for multiple advertising campaigns for sport brands and is often participating in public speaking engagements.

After retiring from competition, Tsoy wrote After the Podium: How to Win After Sport (2023), a book about athletes' transition out of competitive sport, and narrated its audiobook edition. She is also the author of Altitude Protocol, a guide to performing under pressure, and develops performance protocols for female athletes. In May 2026 she was issued a Commercial Pilot Licence (Helicopter) by Transport Canada.

She is currently residing in Vancouver, BC with her daughter and husband.
