= Ingemar Walder =

Austrian snowboarder

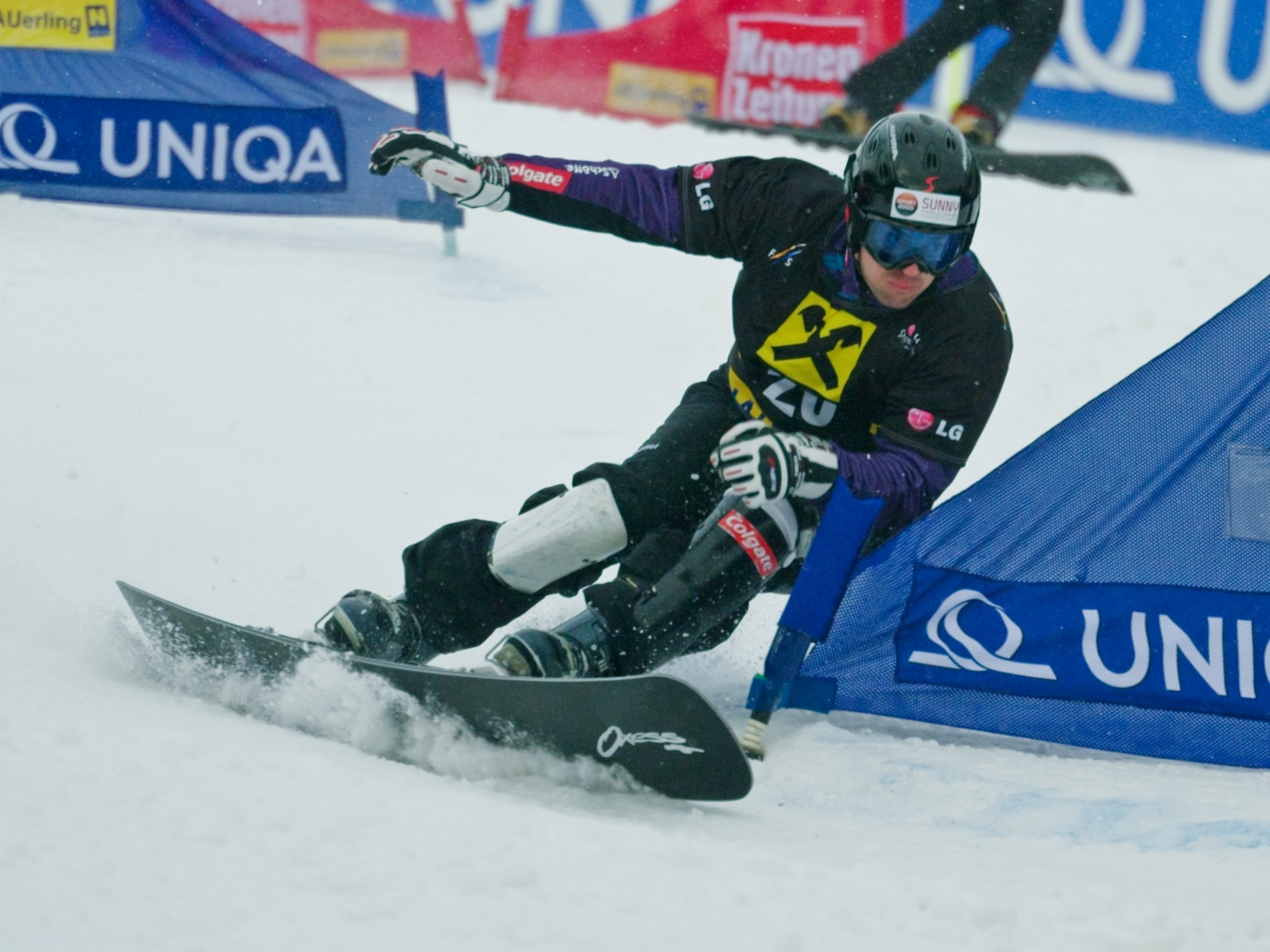
- Ingemar Walder in the qualification round of the World Cup Parallel Slalom at the Jauerling in Austria on 13 January 2012.

Personal information
- Nationality: Austrian
- Born: June 5, 1978 (age 46)

Sport
- Sport: Snowboarding

Ingemar Walder (born 5 June 1978 in Sillian) is an Austrian snowboarder. He placed 29th in the men's parallel giant slalom event at the 2010 Winter Olympics.
