= Stefanie Müller =

Swiss snowboarder (born 1992)

Personal information
- Born: 5 June 1992 (age 34) Davos, Switzerland

Sport
- Sport: Skiing

Stefanie Müller (born 5 June 1992 in Davos) is a Swiss snowboarder, specializing in Alpine snowboarding.

Müller competed at the 2014 Winter Olympics for Switzerland. She was 17th in the qualifying run of the parallel giant slalom and 18th in the parallel slalom not advancing in either event.

As of September 2014, her best showing at the World Championships is 1st, in the 2011 parallel slalom.

Müller made her World Cup debut in December 2008. As of September 2014, her best finish is 4th, in a parallel giant slalom at Carezza in 2012–13. Her best overall finish is 18th, in 2012–13.
