= Julia Dujmovits =

Austrian snowboarder (born 1987)

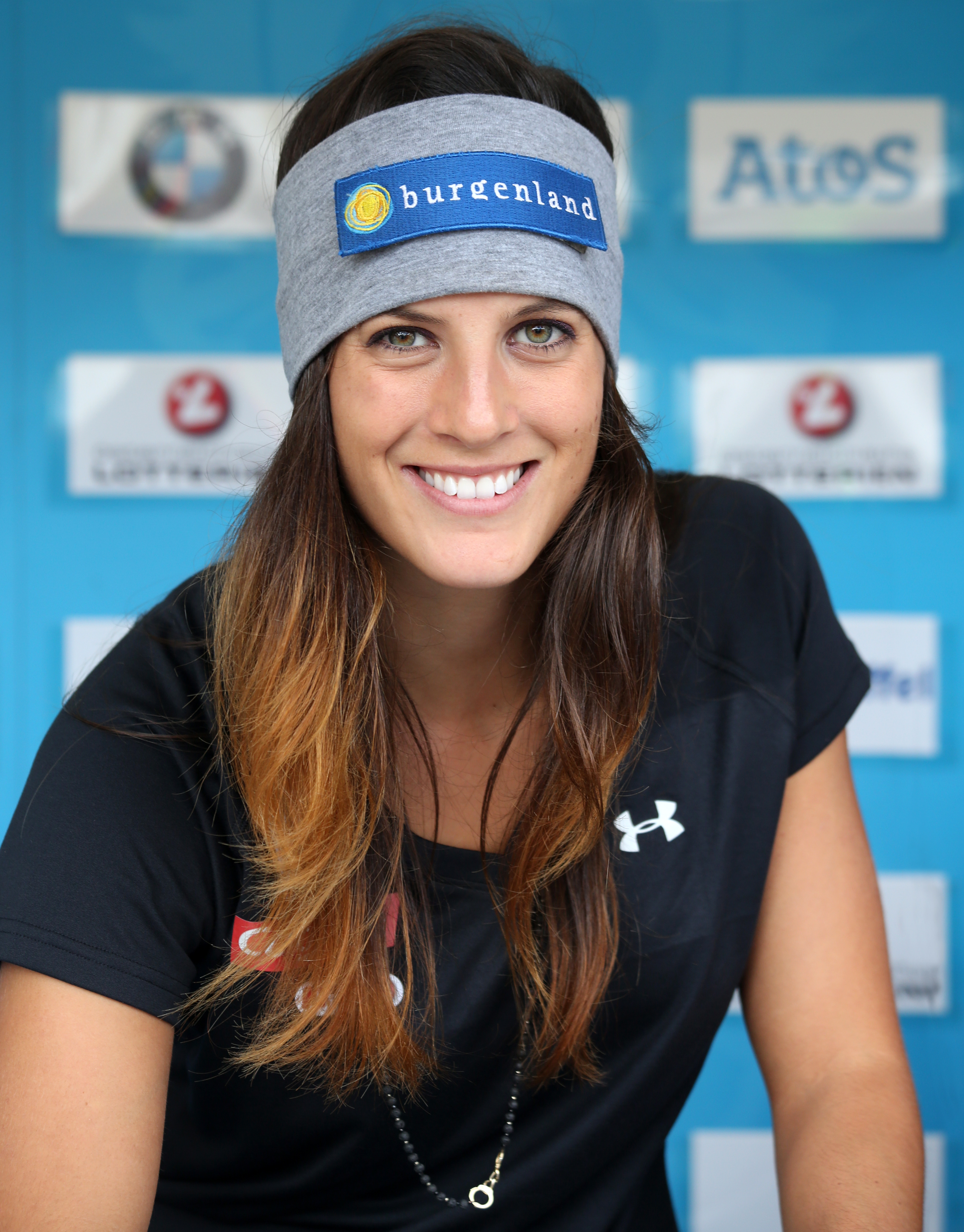
- Dujmovits in 2013

Personal information
- Nationality: Austrian
- Born: 12 June 1987 (age 39) Güssing, Austria
- Height: 168 cm (5 ft 6 in)
- Weight: 56 kg (123 lb)
- Website: julia-dujmovits.com

Sport
- Country: Austria
- Sport: Snowboarding
- Event(s): Parallel slalom, parallel giant slalom
- Club: Union SK Güssing
- Coached by: Bernd Krug, Manuel Kruselburger, Brigitte Köck

Achievements and titles
- Olympic finals: Gold Medal in parallel slalom at Sochi 2014
- World finals: Silver Medal in parallel giant slalom at Stoneham 2013; Silver Medal in parallel slalom at Kreischberg 2015
- Highest world ranking: 3rd in Parallel World Cup (2012, 2014)
Medal record
Women's snowboarding
Representing Austria
International snowboarding competitions
Event	1st	2nd	3rd
Olympic Games	1	0	0
World Championships	0	2	1
Winter Universiade	1	0	0
World Junior Championships	1	0	2
Total	3	2	3
World Cup race podiums
Event	1st	2nd	3rd
Parallel Slalom	1	4	3
Parallel Giant Slalom	2	5	6
Total	3	9	9
Olympic Games
Gold medal – first place	2014 Sochi	Parallel slalom
World Championships
Silver medal – second place	2013 Stoneham	Parallel giant slalom
Silver medal – second place	2015 Kreischberg	Parallel slalom
Bronze medal – third place	2021 Rogla	Parallel GS
Winter Universiade
Gold medal – first place	2013 Trentino	Parallel giant slalom
World Junior Championships
Gold medal – first place	2007 Bad Gastein	Parallel slalom
Bronze medal – third place	2006 Vivaldi Park	Parallel giant slalom
Bronze medal – third place	2006 Vivaldi Park	Snowboard cross
- Updated on 1 March 2021

Julia Dujmovits (born 12 June 1987) is an Austrian snowboarder.

Dujmovits won silver in the parallel giant slalom at the 2013 FIS Snowboarding World Championships. She won a gold in the same discipline at the 2013 Winter Universiade. At the Sochi Olympics in 2014, she became the first Austrian to win gold in snowboarding. She was present at the Kaprun Funicular Disaster on 11 November 2000, a fire which claimed the lives of 155 people including Julia's friends and teammates. "Since there was a snowboarding event on that day and a big line at the cable railway, my brother suggested taking the gondola instead, a decision which ultimately saved our lives."

== World Cup results ==
All results are sourced from the International Ski Federation (FIS).

=== Season standings ===
Season	Age	Parallel Overall	Parallel Slalom	Parallel Giant Slalom
2004	16	75	—N/a	—N/a
2005	17	48	—N/a	—N/a
2006	18	22	—N/a	—N/a
2007	19	20	—N/a	—N/a
2008	20	7	—N/a	—N/a
2009	21	18	—N/a	—N/a
2010	22	15	—N/a	—N/a
2011	23	6	—N/a	—N/a
2012	24	3	—N/a	—N/a
2013	25	10	6	12
2014	26	3	5	4
2015	27	5	7	5
2016	28	7	7	9
2017	29	6	8	6
2018	30	4	10	3

=== Race podiums ===
- 3 wins – (2 PGS, 1 PSL)
- 21 podiums – (13 PGS, 8 PSL)

Season	Date	Location	Discipline	Place
2005–06	19 March 2006	Furano, Japan	Parallel Giant Slalom	2nd
2007–08	16 December 2007	Nendaz, Switzerland	Parallel Slalom	1st
2007–08	24 February 2008	Gujō, Japan	Parallel Giant Slalom	2nd
2009–10	6 March 2010	Moscow, Russia	Parallel Slalom	3rd
2010–11	19 March 2011	Valmalenco, Italy	Parallel Giant Slalom	3rd
2010–11	27 March 2011	Arosa, Switzerland	Parallel Giant Slalom	3rd
2011–12	15 December 2011	(United States) Telluride, USA	Parallel Giant Slalom	1st
2011–12	22 February 2012	Stoneham, Canada	Parallel Giant Slalom	2nd
2011–12	3 March 2012	Moscow, Russia	Parallel Slalom	2nd
2011–12	17 March 2012	Valmalenco, Italy	Parallel Giant Slalom	3rd
2012–13	12 January 2013	Bad Gastein, Austria	Parallel Slalom	2nd
2013–14	12 January 2014	Bad Gastein, Austria	Parallel Slalom	2nd
2013–14	18 January 2014	Rogla, Slovenia	Parallel Giant Slalom	3rd
2013–14	7 February 2015	Sudelfeld, Germany	Parallel Giant Slalom	3rd
2014–15	28 February 2015	Asahikawa, Japan	Parallel Giant Slalom	1st
2014–15	1 March 2015	Asahikawa, Japan	Parallel Slalom	3rd
2015–16	8 January 2016	Bad Gastein, Austria	Parallel Slalom	2nd
2016–17	3 February 2017	Bansko, Bulgaria	Parallel Giant Slalom	2nd
2016–17	18 March 2017	Winterberg, Germany	Parallel Slalom	3rd
2017–18	5 January 2018	Lackenhof, Austria	Parallel Giant Slalom	2nd
2017–18	20 January 2018	Rogla, Slovenia	Parallel Giant Slalom	3rd

== Olympic results ==
Year	Age	Parallel Slalom	Parallel Giant Slalom
(Russia) 2014 Sochi	26	1	29
(South Korea) 2018 Pyeongchang	30	—N/a	12

== World Championships results ==
Year	Age	Parallel Slalom	Parallel Giant Slalom
(Spain) 2011 La Molina	24	10	10
(Canada) 2013 Stoneham	26	10	2
(Austria) 2015 Kreischberg	28	2	13
(Spain) 2017 Sierra Nevada	30	5	6
