= Shin Da-hae =

South Korean snowboarder

Personal information
- Born: 13 November 1988 (age 36)

Sport
- Country: South Korea
- Sport: Snowboarding

Shin Da-hae (born 13 November 1988) is a South Korean snowboarder.

She competed in the 2005, 2009, 2011, 2013, 2015 and 2017 FIS Snowboard World Championships, and in the 2018 Winter Olympics, in parallel giant slalom.
