= Karolina Sztokfisz =

Polish snowboarder

Karolina Sztokfisz (born 15 February 1989) is a Polish snowboarder. She was born in Zakopane. She competed in parallel giant slalom and parallel slalom at the FIS Snowboarding World Championships 2013. She competed at the 2014 Winter Olympics in Sochi, in parallel giant slalom and parallel slalom.
