= Yekaterina Ilyukhina =

Russian snowboarder

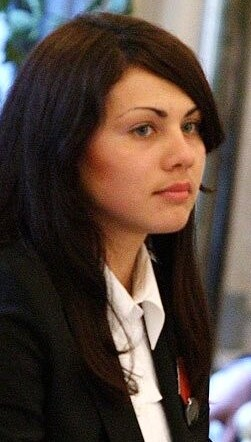

Medal record

Women's snowboarding

Representing Russia

Olympic Games
Silver medal – second place	2010 Vancouver	Parallel giant slalom

Yekaterina Sergeyevna Ilyukhina (Russian: Екатерина Серге́евна Илюхина; born June 19, 1987, in Novosibirsk) is a Russian snowboarder, specializing in parallel giant slalom, an event in which she won a silver medal at the 2010 Winter Olympics.
