= Corinna Boccacini =

Italian snowboarder (born 1985)

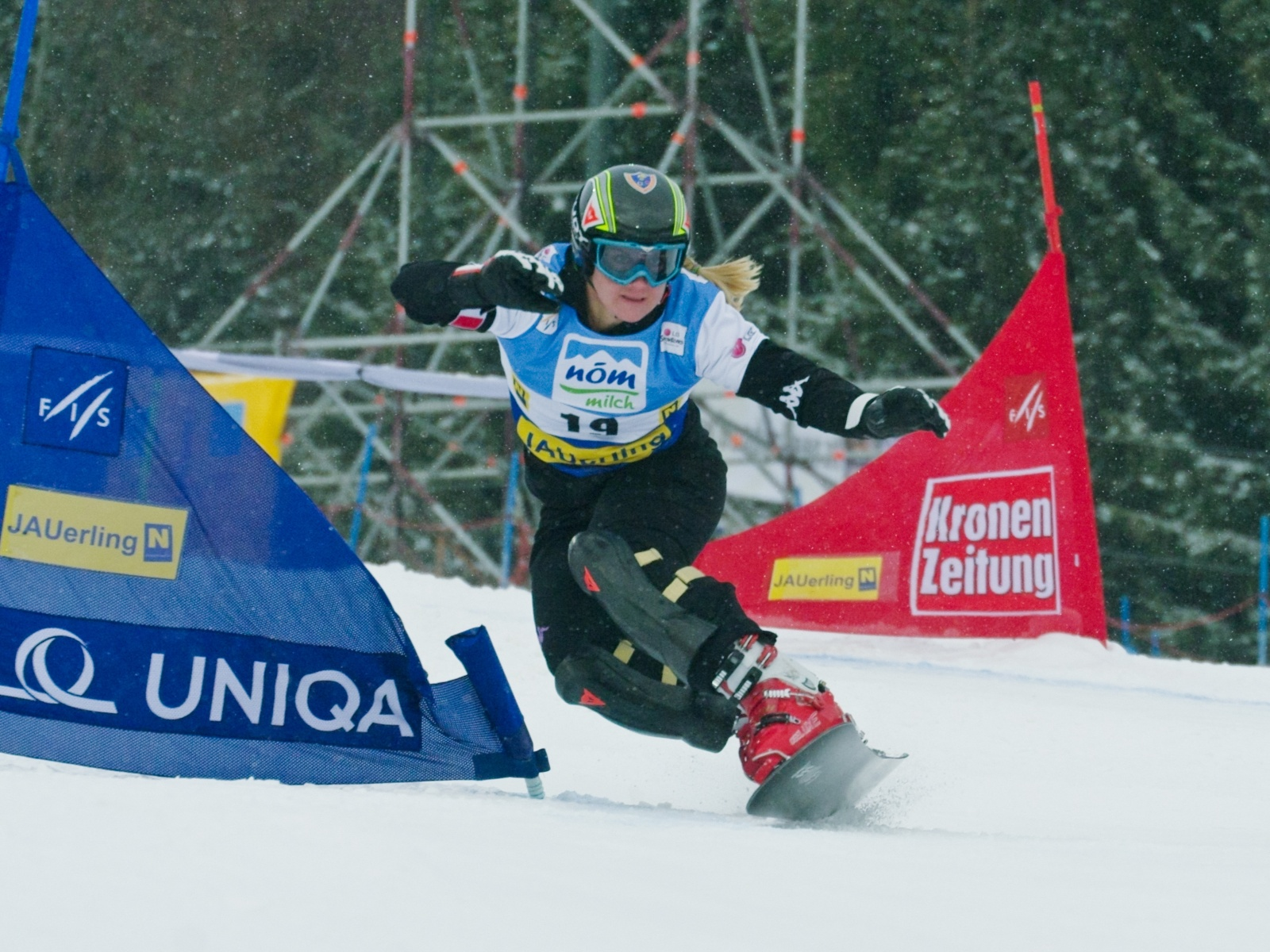
Corinna Boccacini in 2012

Corinna Boccacini (born 10 March 1985) is an Italian snowboarder. She competed in the slalom events at the 2014 Winter Olympics for Italy.
