= Tomoka Takeuchi =

Japanese snowboarder (born 1983)

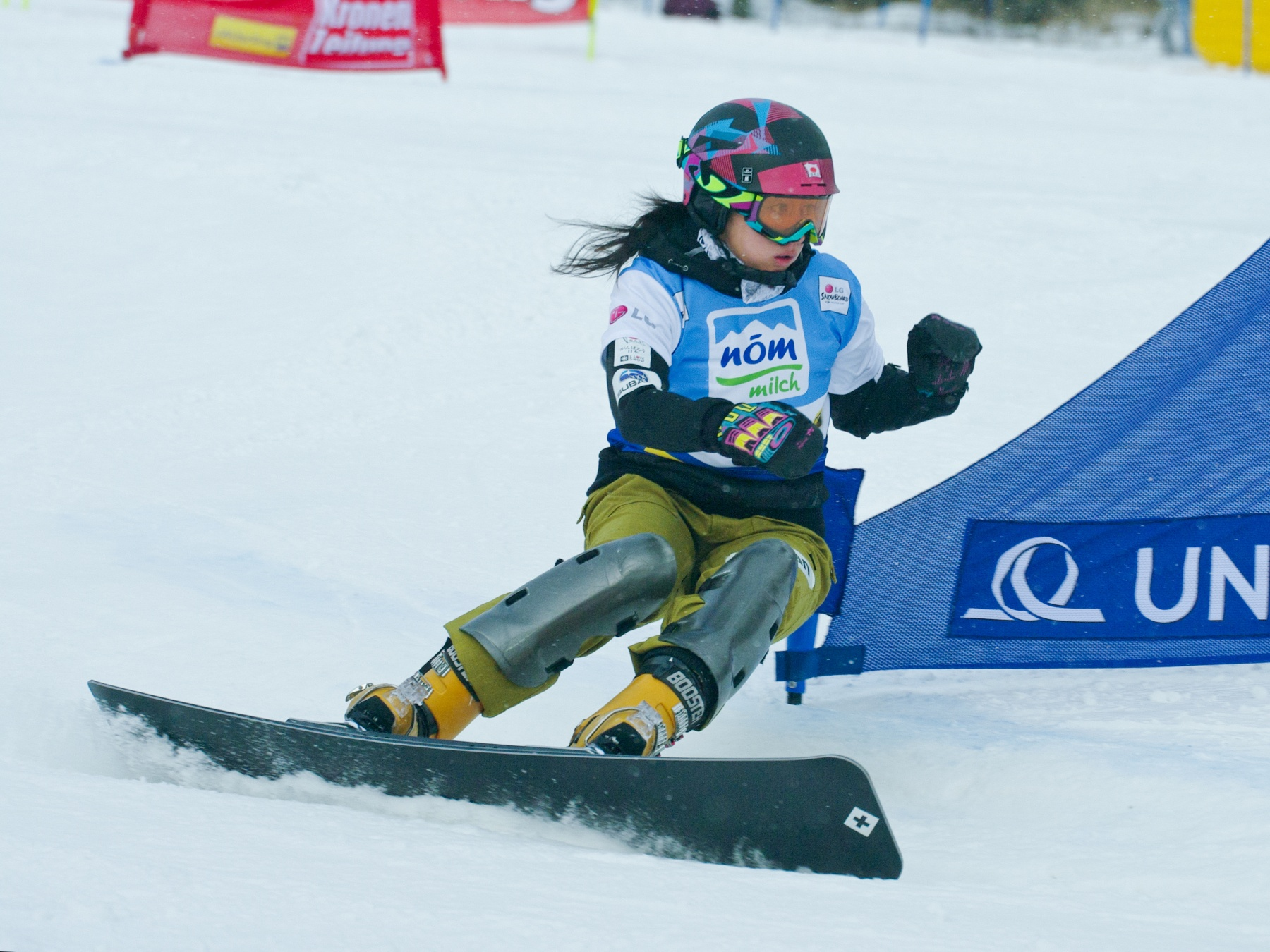
- Takeuchi in 2012

Personal information
- Born: 21 December 1983 (age 42) Asahikawa, Hokkaido, Japan
- Height: 165 cm (5 ft 5 in)
- Weight: 62 kg (137 lb)

Sport
- Country: Japan
- Sport: Snowboarding
Medal record
Women's snowboarding
Representing Japan
Olympic Games
Silver medal – second place	2014 Sochi	Parallel giant slalom
World Championships
Bronze medal – third place	2015 Kreischberg	Parallel giant slalom

Tomoka Takeuchi (竹内 智香, Takeuchi Tomoka; born 21 December 1983) is a Japanese competitive snowboarder from Asahikawa, Hokkaido. She won the silver medal in the Women's Parallel Giant Slalom in the 2014 Winter Olympics in Sochi, Russia. At the 2018 Winter Olympics in Pyeongchang, South Korea, she placed 5th in the Women's Parallel Giant Slalom.
