= Marianne Leeson =

Canadian snowboarder

Personal information
- Born: 19 October 1987 (age 38) Burlington, Ontario
- Height: 1.73 m (5 ft 8 in)
- Weight: 62 kg (137 lb)

Sport
- Country: Canada
- Sport: Snowboarding
- Events: Parallel slalom Parallel giant slalom

Marianne Leeson (born 19 October 1987 in Burlington, Ontario) is a Canadian snowboarder. She competed in the slalom events at the 2014 Winter Olympics for Canada and placed 5th, the highest ever finish of a Canadian Female Alpine Snowboarder at the Olympic games.
