= Nicolien Sauerbreij =

Dutch snowboarder

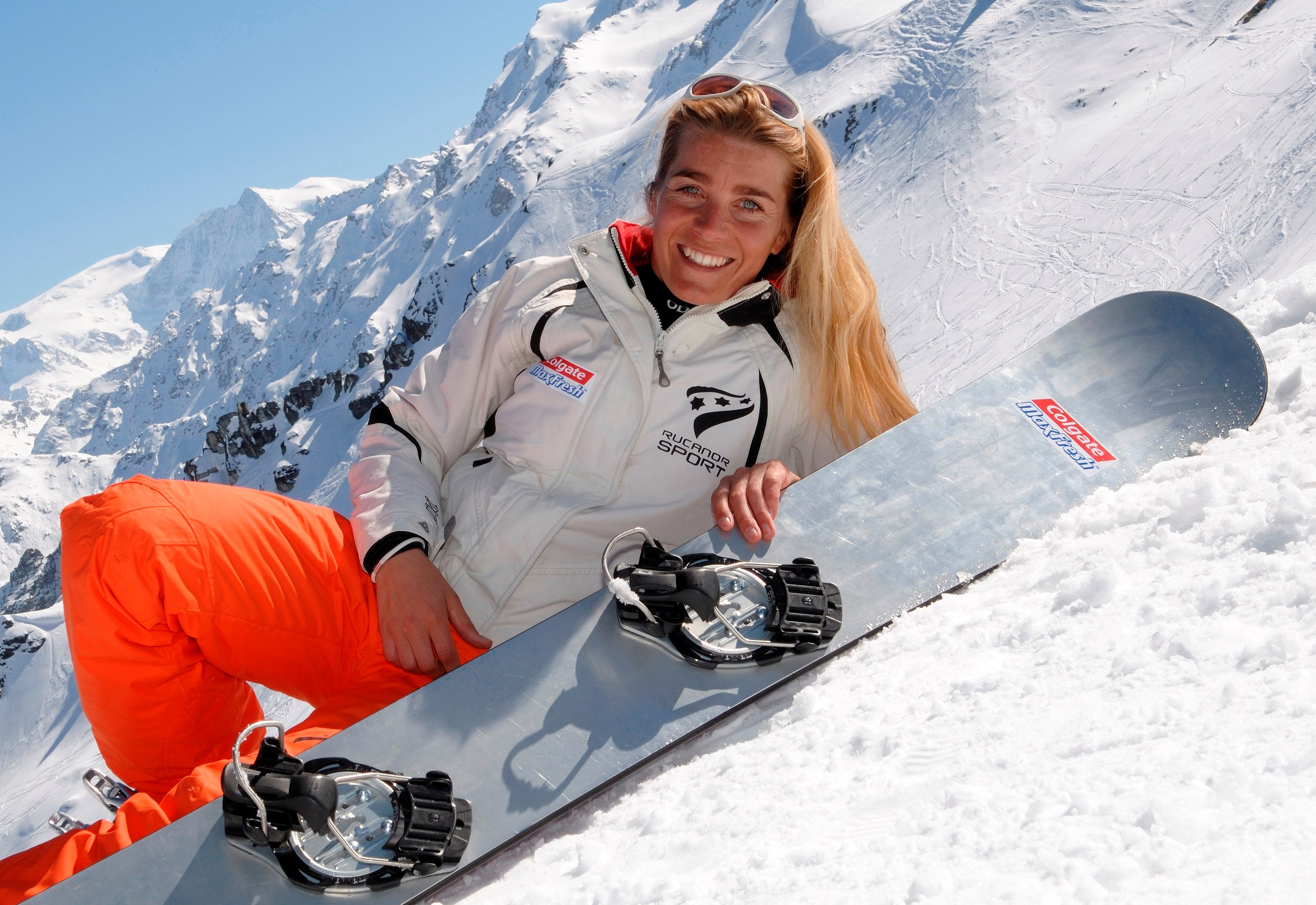

Personal information
- Nationality: Dutch
- Born: 31 July 1979 (age 46) De Hoef, Netherlands
- Height: 1.65 m (5 ft 5 in)
- Weight: 57 kg (126 lb)
- Website: www.nicoliensauerbreij.nl

Sport
- Country: Netherlands
- Sport: Snowboarding
- Event(s): Parallel slalom Parallel giant slalom
- Coached by: Maarten Sauerbreij
Medal record
Women's snowboarding
Representing the Netherlands
Olympic Games
Gold medal – first place	2010 Vancouver	Parallel giant slalom
World Championships
Silver medal – second place	2011 La Molina	Parallel slalom

Nicolien Sauerbreij (Dutch pronunciation: [ˈnikoːlin ˈsʌu.ərˌbrɛi], born 31 July 1979) is a Dutch professional snowboarder. She won seven World Cup races and ranked first in the parallel giant slalom standings of the 2007–2008 and the 2009–2010 World Cup. She competed in the Winter Olympic Games of 2002, 2006 and won the gold medal in the women's parallel giant slalom in the 2010 Winter Olympics.

== Biography ==
Nicolien Sauerbreij was born in the small village De Hoef in the province Utrecht in the Netherlands. She has a sister Marieke Sauerbreij, who is also a professional snowboarder. Her father is Maarten Sauerbreij, who is also her coach.

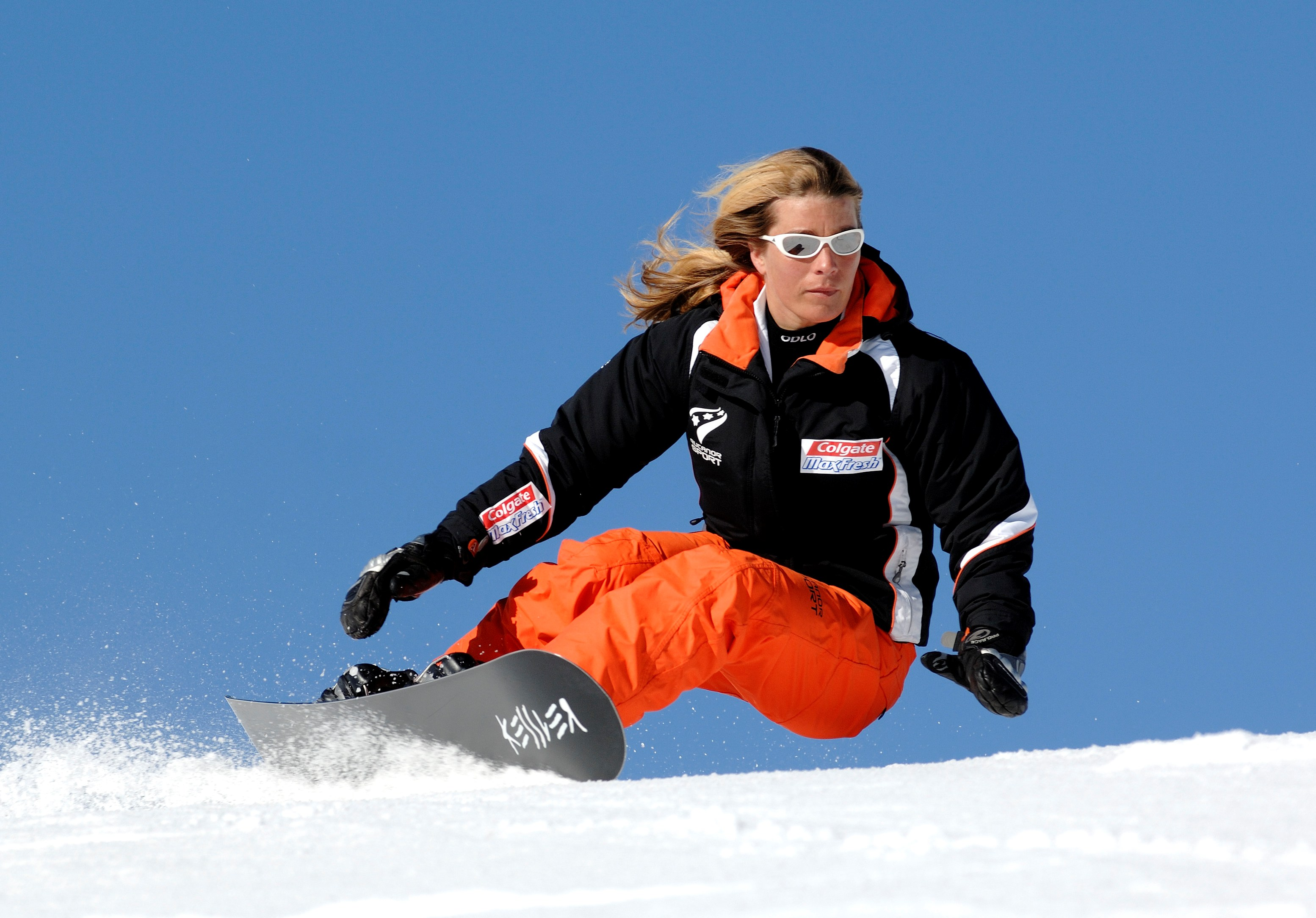
Nicolien Sauerbreij in action.

Her first podium position was in the world cup in Mont-Sainte-Anne 2001. She became second in the parallel giant slalom.

On 15 September 2002 she won her first World cup in the parallel giant slalom. This was in Chile at the Valle Nevado. In the same season she had her second victory in Slovenia at the Maribor.

Sauerbreij has also competed in several world cups with success, achieving several podium positions, including first placings in 2002, 2003, 2008 and 2010. She finished first in the overall standings of the parallel giant slalom World Cup in the 2007–2008 World Cup season and also first in the overall standings of the parallel giant slalom World Cup in the 2009–2010 World Cup season.

She won the 2010 Dutch sportswoman of the year award.

== Olympic Games ==
At the 2002 Winter Olympics in Salt Lake City, she was the flag bearer for the Netherlands and she was among the outsiders for a medal. Since snowboarding is a small sport in the Netherlands, Sauerbreij used the wax services provided by the Italian team. Due to using the wrong wax on her board she did not qualify among the first sixteen that entered the knock-out rounds.

At the 2006 Winter Olympics in Turin she managed to qualify among the last sixteen and was determined to prove herself on the Olympic stage. In the first knock-out round she faced German Amelie Kober. Kober fell during the first run, giving Sauerbreij the maximum advantage for the second run, 1.5 seconds. In the second run Sauerbreij decided to go down safely and not fall herself. However Kober managed to come back on Sauerbreij and beat her with 0.03 of a second in the final metres. Kober went on to reach the final and take the silver medal.

At the 2010 Winter Olympics in Vancouver, Nicolien Sauerbreij won the gold medal on the women's parallel giant slalom. This was the first Dutch medal at a non-ice skating event in the Winter Olympics, and the 100th Dutch gold medal at the Olympic Games.

== Career highlights ==
Winter Olympics
2002 – Salt Lake City, 24th at parallel giant slalom
2006 – Turin, 12th at parallel giant slalom
2010 – Vancouver, (gold) 1st at parallel giant slalom
FIS Snowboard World Championships
1999 – Berchtesgaden, 21st at giant slalom
1999 – Berchtesgaden, 21st at parallel giant slalom
1999 – Berchtesgaden, 15th at parallel slalom
1999 – Berchtesgaden, 27th at snowboardcross
2001 – Madonna di Campiglio, 22nd at giant slalom
2001 – Madonna di Campiglio, 32nd at parallel giant slalom
2001 – Madonna di Campiglio, 30th at parallel slalom
2003 – Kreischberg, 17th at parallel giant slalom
2003 – Kreischberg, 14th at parallel slalom
2005 – Whistler, 13th at parallel giant slalom
2005 – Whistler, 16th at parallel slalom
2007 – Arosa, 9th at parallel giant slalom
2007 – Arosa, 4th at parallel slalom
2009 – Gangwon, 6th at parallel giant slalom
2009 – Gangwon, 11th at parallel slalom
World Cup
2001 – Mont-Sainte-Anne, (silver) 2nd at parallel giant slalom
2002 – Bad Gastein, (bronze) 3rd at parallel slalom
2002 – Valle Nevado, (gold) 1st at parallel giant slalom
2002 – Sölden, (silver) 2nd at parallel slalom
2003 – Maribor, (gold) 1st at parallel slalom
2003 – Serre Chevalier, (bronze) 3rd at parallel slalom
2007 – Landgraaf, (bronze) 3rd at parallel slalom
2007 – Sölden, (bronze) 3rd at parallel giant slalom
2007 – Nendaz, (bronze) 3rd at parallel slalom
2008 – Bad Gastein, (gold) 1st at parallel slalom
2008 – La Molina, (gold) 1st at parallel giant slalom
2008 – La Molina, (silver) 2nd at parallel slalom
2008 – Sungwoo, (silver) 2nd at parallel giant slalom
2008 – Gujo-Gifu, (gold) 1st at parallel giant slalom
2008 – Stoneham, (gold) 1st at parallel giant slalom
2008 – Landgraaf, (bronze) 3rd at parallel slalom
2009 – Sudelfeld, (bronze) 3rd at parallel giant slalom
2010 – Kreischberg, (gold) 1st at parallel giant slalom
2010 – Nendaz, (silver) 2nd at parallel giant slalom
2010 – Sudelfeld, (silver) 2nd at parallel giant slalom
European Cup
2003 – Berchtesgaden, (gold) 1st at parallel giant slalom
2004 – Haus im Ennstal, (gold) 1st at parallel giant slalom
2006 – Vratna-Terchova, (bronze) 3rd at parallel giant slalom (1)
2006 – Vratna-Terchova, (silver) 2nd at parallel giant slalom (2)
2008 – Bad Gastein, (gold) 1st at parallel slalom
2008 – Sudelfeld, (gold) 1st at parallel giant slalom
2010 – Nendaz, (gold) 1st at parallel giant slalom
North American Cup
2004 – Crystal Mountain, (silver) 2nd at parallel giant slalom (1)
2004 – Crystal Mountain, (silver) 2nd at parallel slalom (1)
2004 – Crystal Mountain, (bronze) 3rd at parallel giant slalom (2)
2004 – Crystal Mountain, (silver) 2nd at parallel slalom (2)
2005 – Okemo, (bronze) 3rd at parallel giant slalom
2007 – Bromley, (silver) 2nd at parallel giant slalom
2007 – Bromley, (gold) 1st at parallel slalom
2009 – Steamboat Springs, (gold) 1st at parallel giant slalom
Continental Cup
1998 – Berchtesgaden, (bronze) 3rd at giant slalom
1999 – Falcade, (silver) 2nd at parallel slalom
FIS Races
1996 – Alpe d'Huez, (bronze) 3rd at giant slalom
1996 – Val Senales, (silver) 2nd at parallel slalom
2000 – Lenggries, (silver) 2nd at slalom
2001 – Racines/Ratschings, (bronze) 3rd at parallel slalom
2003 – Bad Gastein, (gold) 1st at parallel slalom
2004 – Kühtai, (silver) 2nd at parallel slalom
2004 – Haus im Ennstal, (gold) 1st at parallel giant slalom

== Footnotes ==
Awards
Preceded by Marianne Vos	Dutch Sportswoman of the year 2010	Succeeded by Ranomi Kromowidjojo
Olympic Games
Preceded by Carla Zijlstra	Flagbearer for Netherlands; Salt Lake City 2002	Succeeded by Jan Bos
