= Anke Karstens =

German snowboarder (born 1985)

Anke Wöhrer
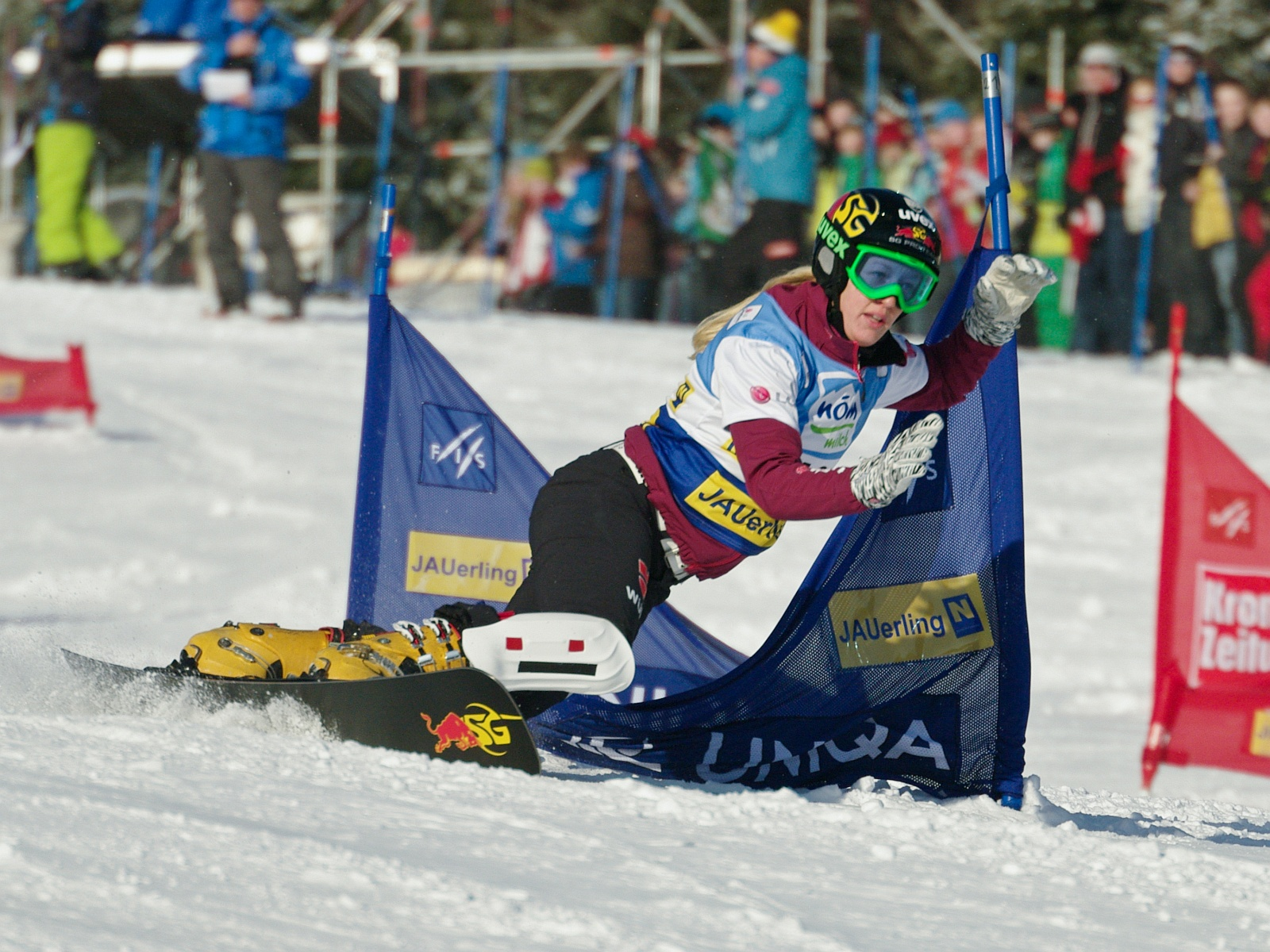
- Karstens at a World Cup qualification, Jauerling, Austria, 2012

Personal information
- Born: Anke Karstens; 13 October 1985 (age 41) Berchtesgaden, Bavaria, West Germany
- Occupation: German snowboarder
Medal record
Women's snowboarding
Representing Germany
Olympic Games
Silver medal – second place	2014 Sochi	Parallel slalom

Anke Wöhrer (also spelled Woehrer, née Karstens; born 13 October 1985, in Berchtesgaden) is a German snowboarder. She participated at the 2014 Winter Olympics and 2018 Winter Olympics, earning the silver medal in the women's parallel slalom event in 2014.
