= Amelie Kober =

German snowboarder

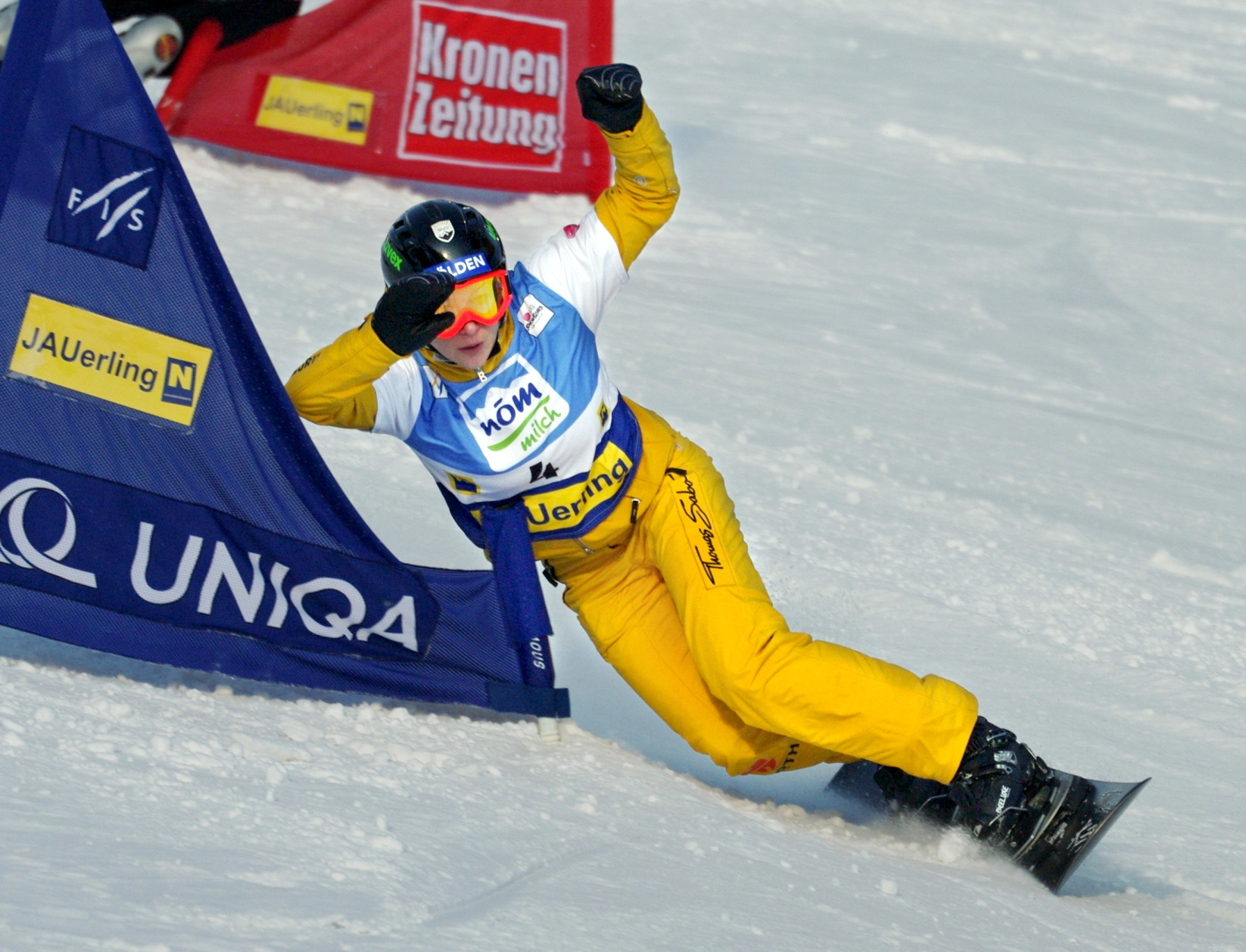

Medal record

Women's snowboarding

Representing Germany

Olympic Games
Silver medal – second place	2006 Turin	Parallel Giant Slalom
Bronze medal – third place	2014 Sochi	Parallel Slalom

FIS Snowboarding World Championships
Silver medal – second place	2007 Arosa	Parallel Giant Slalom
Bronze medal – third place	2013 Stoneham	Parallel Giant Slalom
Bronze medal – third place	2013 Stoneham	Parallel Slalom

Amelie Kober (born 16 November 1987 in Bad Aibling) is a German Federal Police officer and Olympic medalist in snowboarding.

== Biography ==
At the Junior World Championships 2005 in Zermatt, Switzerland she won silver. In the World Cup she was ranked fifth.

She was the youngest competitor in the Parallel Giant Slalom competition at the 2006 Winter Olympics in Turin, Italy. Despite a fall during the quarter-finals, she caught up with her competitor and proceeded to the semi-finals and final round, winning silver.

At the FIS Snowboarding World Championships 2007 in Arosa, Switzerland she won silver in the Parallel Giant Slalom competition.

She won the Parallel Giant Slalom competition of the 2009–10 FIS Snowboard World Cup in Sudelfeld, Germany.

== Personal life ==
Kober tells in an interview after the half final of the Snowboard Competition at 2010 Winter Olympics that she is pregnant: "It's true that this season I will not compete more than one race because I'm a mum."
