= Patrizia Kummer =

Swiss snowboarder (born 1987)

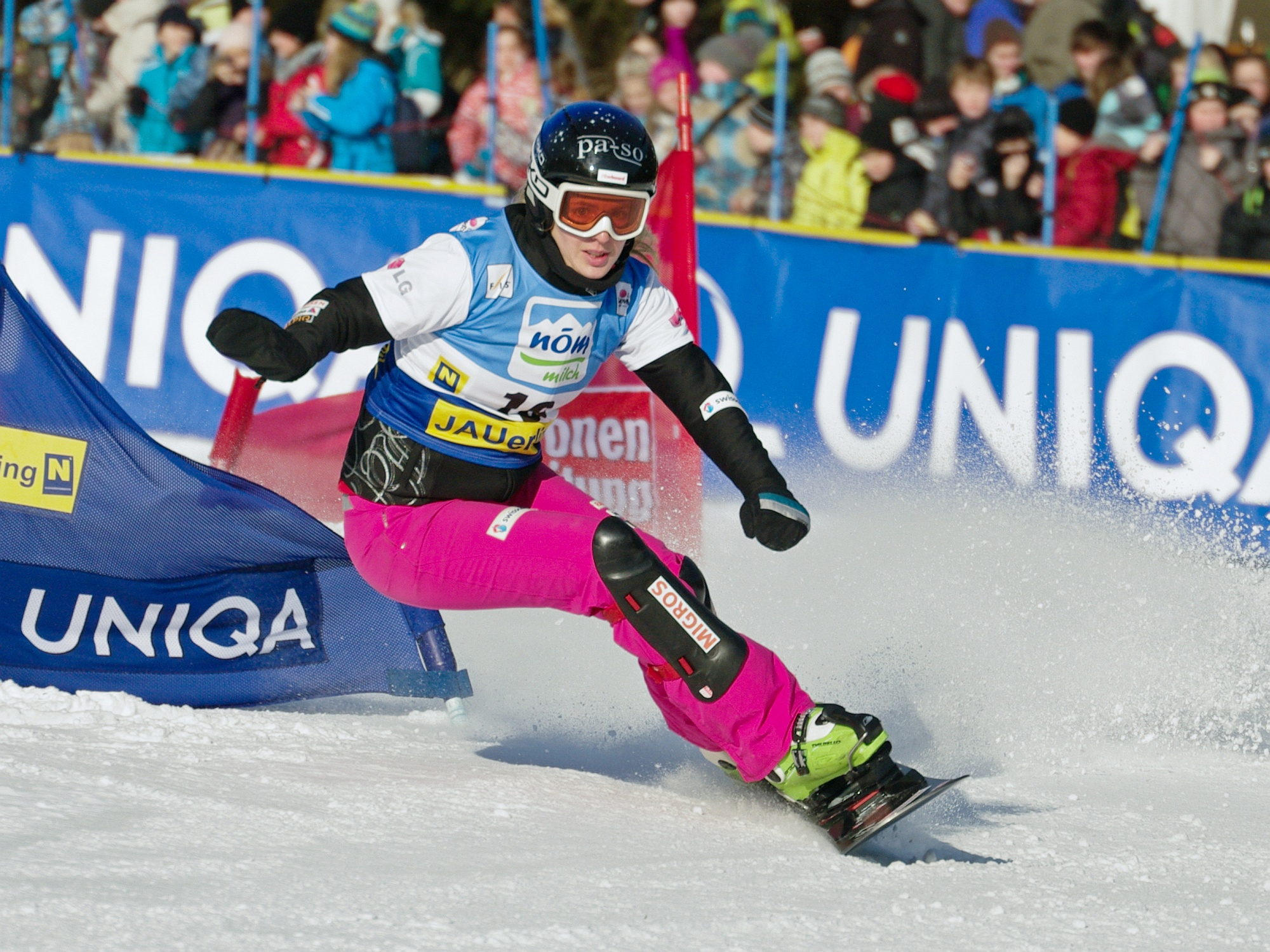
- Kummer in 2012

Medal record

Representing Switzerland

Women's Snowboarding

Olympic Games
Gold medal – first place	2014 Sochi	Parallel giant slalom

World Championships
Silver medal – second place	2013 Stoneham	Parallel slalom
Bronze medal – third place	2009 Gangwon	Parallel giant slalom

Winter Universiade
Gold medal – first place	2015 Granada	Parallel giant slalom

Patrizia Kummer (born 16 October 1987 in Brig) is a Swiss snowboarder.

Kummer won silver in the parallel slalom at the 2013 FIS Snowboarding World Championships, and gold in the Parallel giant slalom at the 2014 Sochi Olympics
