= 2006–07 FIS Snowboard World Cup =

International snowboarding competition

Snowboard World Cup 2006/07
Discipline	Men	Women
Overall	(Switzerland) Simon Schoch	(Austria) Doresia Krings
Parallel slalom	(Switzerland) Simon Schoch	(Austria) Doresia Krings
Snowboard cross	(Canada) Drew Neilson	(United States) Lindsey Jacobellis
Halfpipe	(Japan) Ryō Aono	(Switzerland) Manuela Laura Pesko
Big Air	(Finland) Peetu Piiroinen	

Competition
Locations	17 in 10 countries	13 in 9 countries
Individual	27 (1 cancelled)	23 (1 cancelled)

The 2006–07 FIS Snowboard World Cup is a multi race tournament over a season for snowboarding. The season began on 13 October 2006, and finished on 18 March 2007. The World Cup is organized by the FIS who also run world cups and championships in cross-country skiing, ski jumping, Nordic combined, alpine skiing, and freestyle skiing.

== Men ==
=== Parallel Slalom ===
Date	Place	Winner	Second	Third
October 13, 2006	Landgraaf, The Netherlands	Siegfried Grabner (AUT)	Simon Schoch (SUI)	Marc Iselin (SUI)
December 20, 2006	Bad Gastein, Austria	Siegfried Grabner (AUT)	Simon Schoch (SUI)	Philipp Schoch (SUI)
December 21, 2006	Bad Gastein, Austria	Simon Schoch (SUI)	Roland Haldi (SUI)	Jasey-Jay Anderson (CAN)
January 28, 2007	Nendaz, Switzerland	Simon Schoch (SUI)	Mathieu Bozzetto (FRA)	Matthew Morison (CAN)
February 9, 2007	Shukolovo, Russia	Marc Iselin (SUI)	Matthew Morison (CAN)	Rok Flander (SLO)

=== Parallel Giant Slalom ===
Date	Place	Winner	Second	Third
October 22, 2006	Sölden, Austria	Simon Schoch (SUI)	Rok Flander (SLO)	Philipp Schoch (SUI)
December 13, 2006	Mareo, Italy	Rok Flander (SLO)	Siegfried Grabner (AUT)	Simon Schoch (SUI)
February 2, 2007	Bardonecchia, Italy	Roland Haldi (SUI)	Nicolas Huet (FRA)	Heinz Inniger (SUI)
February 16, 2007	Furano, Japan	Matthew Morison (CAN)	Simon Schoch (SUI)	Rok Marguč (SLO)
February 25, 2007	Sungwoo, South Korea	Jasey-Jay Anderson (CAN)	Andreas Prommegger (AUT)	Mathieu Bozzetto (FRA)
March 16, 2007	Stoneham, Canada	Heinz Inniger (SUI)	Siegfried Grabner (AUT)	Marc Iselin (SUI)

=== Snowboard Cross ===
Date	Place	Winner	Second	Third
February 17, 2007	Furano, Japan	Drew Neilson (CAN)	Nate Holland (USA)	Simon Bonenfant (CAN)
March 8, 2007	Lake Placid, United States	Drew Neilson (CAN)	Nate Holland (USA)	Simone Malusà (ITA)
March 11, 2007	Lake Placid, United States	Drew Neilson (CAN)	Nate Holland (USA)	David Speiser (GER)
March 17, 2007	Stoneham, Canada	Pierre Vaultier (FRA)	Nick Baumgartner (USA)	Drew Neilson (CAN)

=== Halfpipe ===
Date	Place	Winner	Second	Third
November 23, 2006	Saas Fee, Switzerland	Scott Lago (USA)	Markus Malin (FIN)	Daisuke Murakami (JPN)
November 25, 2006	Saas Fee, Switzerland	Cancelled		
February 3, 2007	Bardonecchia, Italy	Peetu Piiroinen (FIN)	Janne Korpi (FIN)	Xaver Hoffmann (GER)
February 18, 2007	Furano, Japan	Ryō Aono (JPN)	Kōhei Kudō (JPN)	Kazuhiro Kokubo (JPN)
February 24, 2007	Sungwoo, South Korea	Jeff Batchelor (CAN)	Dolf van der Wal (NED)	Andrew Burton (AUS)
March 2, 2007	Calgary, Canada	Ryō Aono (JPN)	Kōhei Kudō (JPN)	Rolf Feldmann (SUI)
March 3, 2007	Calgary, Canada	Ryō Aono (JPN)	Dylan Bidez (USA)	Brad Martin (CAN)
March 10, 2007	Lake Placid, United States	Steven Fisher (USA)	Tommy Czeschin (USA)	Elijah Teter (USA)
March 18, 2007	Stoneham, Canada	Daniel Friberg (SUI)	Ryō Aono (JPN)	Brendan Davis (CAN)

=== Big Air ===
Date	Place	Winner	Second	Third
November 11, 2006	Stockholm, Sweden	Matevž Petek (SLO)	Peetu Piiroinen (FIN)	Risto Mattila (FIN)
January 6, 2007	Graz, Austria	Peetu Piiroinen (FIN)	Hubert Fill (AUT)	Benedikt Nadig (SUI)
February 4, 2007	Turin, Italy	Janne Korpi (FIN)	Jaakko Ruha (FIN)	Stefan Gimpl (AUT)
February 10, 2007	Moscow, Russia	Peetu Piiroinen (FIN)	Jaakko Ruha (FIN)	Matevž Petek (SLO)

== Women ==
=== Parallel Slalom ===
Date	Place	Winner	Second	Third
October 13, 2006	Landgraaf, The Netherlands	Amelie Kober (GER)	Marion Kreiner (AUT)	Heidi Neururer (AUT)
December 20, 2006	Bad Gastein, Austria	Yekaterina Tudegesheva (RUS)	Doresia Krings (AUT)	Heidi Neururer (AUT)
December 21, 2006	Bad Gastein, Austria	Doresia Krings (AUT)	Heidi Neururer (AUT)	Julie Pomagalski (FRA)
January 28, 2007	Nendaz, Switzerland	Selina Jörg (GER)	Heidi Neururer (AUT)	Doresia Krings (AUT)
February 9, 2007	Shukolovo, Russia	Heidi Neururer (AUT)	Doresia Krings (AUT)	Amelie Kober (GER)

=== Parallel Giant Slalom ===
Date	Place	Winner	Second	Third
October 21, 2006	Sölden, Austria	Fränzi Kohli (SUI)	Doresia Krings (AUT)	Marion Kreiner (AUT)
December 13, 2006	Mareo, Italy	Isabella Dal Balcon (ITA)	Yekaterina Tudegesheva (RUS)	Isabella Laböck (GER)
February 2, 2007	Bardonecchia, Italy	Fränzi Kohli (SUI)	Heidi Neururer (AUT)	Doresia Krings (AUT)
February 16, 2007	Furano, Japan	Isabella Dal Balcon (ITA)	Fränzi Kohli (SUI)	Alexandra Jekova (BUL)
February 25, 2007	Sungwoo, South Korea	Doresia Krings (AUT)	Fränzi Kohli (SUI)	Svetlana Boldykova (RUS)
March 16, 2007	Stoneham, Canada	Fränzi Kohli (SUI)	Claudia Riegler (AUT)	Marion Kreiner (AUT)

=== Snowboard Cross ===
Date	Place	Winner	Second	Third
February 17, 2007	Furano, Japan	Maëlle Ricker (CAN)	Lindsey Jacobellis (USA)	Callan Chythlook-Sifsof (USA)
March 8, 2007	Lake Placid, United States	Lindsey Jacobellis (USA)	Tanja Frieden (SUI)	Sandra Frei (SUI)
March 11, 2007	Lake Placid, United States	Lindsey Jacobellis (USA)	Alexandra Jekova (BUL)	Helene Olafsen (NOR)
March 17, 2007	Stoneham, Canada	Helene Olafsen (NOR)	Diane Thermoz-Liaudy (FRA)	Tanja Frieden (SUI)

=== Halfpipe ===
Date	Place	Winner	Second	Third
November 23, 2006	Saas Fee, Switzerland	Gretchen Bleiler (USA)	Soko Yamaoka (JPN)	Manuela Laura Pesko (SUI)
November 25, 2006	Saas Fee, Switzerland	Cancelled		
February 3, 2007	Bardonecchia, Italy	Manuela Pesko (SUI)	Holly Crawford (AUS)	Paulina Ligocka (POL)
February 18, 2007	Furano, Japan	Holly Crawford (AUS)	Soko Yamaoka (JPN)	Shiho Nakashima (JPN)
February 24, 2007	Sungwoo, South Korea	Paulina Ligocka (POL)	Lee Mi-yeon (KOR)	Kim Yea-na (KOR)
March 2, 2007	Calgary, Canada	Manuela Pesko (SUI)	Liu Jiayu (CHN)	Holly Crawford (AUS)
March 3, 2007	Calgary, Canada	Manuela Pesko (SUI)	Holly Crawford (AUS)	Liu Jiayu (CHN)
March 10, 2007	Lake Placid, United States	Gretchen Bleiler (USA)	Manuela Pesko (SUI)	Holly Crawford (AUS)
March 18, 2007	Stoneham, Canada	Manuela Pesko (SUI)	Holly Crawford (AUS)	Paulina Ligocka (POL)

== Men's cup standings ==
Overall
Pos.		Points
1.	(Switzerland) Simon Schoch	7080
2.	(Austria) Siegfried Grabner	5640
3.	(Finland) Peetu Piiroinen	5200
4.	(Slovenia) Rok Flander	4720
5.	(Switzerland) Roland Haldi	4230
6.	(Japan) Ryō Aono	4000
7.	(France) Mathieu Bozzetto	3830
8.	(Switzerland) Heinz Inniger	3736
9.	(Switzerland) Marc Iselin	3660
10.	(Canada) Matthew Morison	3615

Big air
Pos.		Points
1.	(Finland) Peetu Piiroinen	3300
2.	(Slovenia) Matevž Petek	2200
3.	(Finland) Jaakko Ruha	1980
4.	(Austria) Stefan Gimpl	1740
5.	(Austria) Hubert Fill	1329
6.	(Switzerland) Benedikt Nadig	1136
7.	(Austria) Florian Mausser	1068
8.	(Finland) Janne Korpi	1050
9.	(Austria) Stefan Falkeis	856
10.	(Finland) Ville Uotila	810

Half-pipe
Pos.		Points
1.	(Japan) Ryō Aono	4000
2.	(Japan) Kohei Kudo	2410
3.	(Netherlands) Dolf van der Wal	2067
4.	(Australia) Andrew Burton	2010
5.	(Finland) Peetu Piiroinen	1900
6.	(Canada) Jeff Batchelor	1820
7.	(Canada) Brad Martin	1720
8.	(Switzerland) Daniel Friberg	1635
9.	(Switzerland) Rolf Feldmann	1630
10.	(Germany) Xaver Hoffmann	1540

Parallel slalom
Pos.		Points
1.	(Switzerland) Simon Schoch	7080
2.	(Austria) Siegfried Grabner	5640
2.	(Slovenia) Rok Flander	4720
4.	(Switzerland) Roland Haldi	4230
5.	(France) Mathieu Bozzetto	3830
6.	(Switzerland) Heinz Inniger	3736
7.	(Switzerland) Marc Iselin	3660
8.	(Canada) Matthew Morison	3615
9.	(Austria) Andreas Prommegger	3250
10.	(Canada) Jasey Jay Anderson	2938

Snowboardcross
Pos.		Points
1.	(Canada) Drew Neilson	3600
2.	(United States) Nate Holland	2426
2.	(France) Pierre Vaultier	1700
4.	(Germany) David Speiser	1300
5.	(United States) Nick Baumgartner	1264
6.	(France) Ludovic Guillot-Diat	1118
7.	(Austria) Markus Schairer	1110
8.	(Canada) François Boivin	1040
9.	(Australia) Damon Hayler	980
10.	(Switzerland) Marco Huser	930

== Women's cup standings ==
Overall
Pos.		Points
1.	(Austria) Doresia Krings	7830
2.	(Austria) Heidi Neururer	5590
3.	(Switzerland) Fränzi Kohli	5440
4.	(Switzerland) Manuela Laura Pesko	5400
5.	(Australia) Holly Crawford	5050
6.	(Italy) Isabella Dal Balcon	4410
7.	(Austria) Marion Kreiner	4160
8.	(Poland) Paulina Ligocka	3950
9.	(Germany) Amelie Kober	3700
10.	(Austria) Doris Günther	3670

Half-pipe
Pos.		Points
1.	(Switzerland) Manuela Laura Pesko	5400
2.	(Australia) Holly Crawford	5050
3.	(Poland) Paulina Ligocka	3950
4.	(Japan) Soko Yamaoka	2460
5.	(United States) Gretchen Bleiler	2000
6.	(Japan) Shiho Nakashima	1820
7.	(China) Liu Jiayu	1760
8.	(New Zealand) Juliane Bray	1530
9.	(Canada) Sarah Conrad	1360
10.	(Switzerland) Ursina Haller	1290

Parallel slalom
Pos.		Points
1.	(Austria) Doresia Krings	6480
2.	(Austria) Heidi Neururer	5590
2.	(Switzerland) Fränzi Kohli	5440
4.	(Italy) Isabella Dal Balcon	4410
5.	(Austria) Marion Kreiner	4160
6.	(Germany) Amelie Kober	3700
7.	(Russia) Yekaterina Tudegesheva	3530
8.	(Russia) Svetlana Boldykova	3286
9.	(Austria) Doris Günther	3250
10.	(Germany) Isabella Laböck	2845

Snowboardcross
Pos.		Points
1.	(United States) Lindsey Jacobellis	2800
2.	(Switzerland) Tanja Frieden	2110
3.	(Canada) Maelle Ricker	2080
4.	(Norway) Helene Olafsen	1920
5.	(France) Diane Thermoz Liaudy	1800
6.	(Bulgaria) Alexandra Jekova	1560
7.	(United States) Callan Chythlook-Sifsof	1500
8.	(France) Déborah Anthonioz	1420
9.	(Switzerland) Sandra Frei	1360
10.	(Austria) Doresia Krings	1350

== Podium table by nation ==
Rank	Nation	Gold	Silver	Bronze	Total
1	Switzerland	14	8	11	33
2	Canada	7	1	6	14
3	United States	6	7	2	15
4	Austria	5	12	7	24
5	Finland	4	5	1	10
6	Japan	3	5	3	11
7	Slovenia	2	1	3	6
8	Germany	2	0	4	6
9	Italy	2	0	1	3
10	Australia	1	3	3	7
11	France	1	3	2	6
12	Russia	1	1	1	3
13	Poland	1	0	2	3
14	Norway	1	0	1	2
15	Bulgaria	0	1	1	2
15	China	0	1	1	2
15	South Korea	0	1	1	2
18	Netherlands	0	1	0	1
Totals (18 entries)		50	50	50	150
