= 2008–09 FIS Snowboard World Cup =

International snowboarding competition

Snowboard World Cup 2008/09
Discipline	Men	Women
Overall	(Austria) Siegfried Grabner	(Austria) Doris Günther
Parallel slalom	(Austria) Siegfried Grabner	(Germany) Amelie Kober
Snowboard cross	(Austria) Markus Schairer	(United States) Lindsey Jacobellis
Halfpipe	(Japan) Ryoh Aono	(China) Liu Jiayu
Big Air	(Austria) Stefan Gimpl	

Competition
Locations	19 in 15 countries	15 in 11 countries
Individual	32 (2 cancelled)	27 (2 cancelled)

The 2008–09 FIS Snowboard World Cup is a multi race tournament over a season for snowboarding. The season began on September 6, 2008, and finished on 22 March 2009. The World Cup is organized by the FIS who also runs world cups and championships in cross-country skiing, ski jumping, Nordic combined, alpine skiing, and freestyle skiing.

== Men ==
=== Parallel Slalom ===
Date	Place	Winner	Second	Third
October 10, 2008	Landgraaf, Netherlands	Benjamin Karl (AUT)	Adam Smith (USA)	Patrick Bussler (GER)
December 21, 2008	Arosa, Switzerland	Siegfried Grabner (AUT)	Roland Fischnaller (ITA)	Žan Košir (SLO)
January 7, 2009	Kreischberg, Austria	Simon Schoch (SUI)	Rok Flander (SLO)	Žan Košir (SLO)

=== Parallel Giant Slalom ===
Date	Place	Winner	Second	Third
December 14, 2008	Limone Piemonte, Italy	Matthew Morison (CAN)	Sylvain Dufour (FRA)	Jasey-Jay Anderson (CAN)
January 6, 2009	Kreischberg, Austria	Siegfried Grabner (AUT)	Simon Schoch (SUI)	Meinhard Erlacher (ITA)
January 31, 2009	Bayrischzell, Germany	Andreas Prommegger (AUT)	Matthew Morison (CAN)	Sylvain Dufour (FRA)
February 15, 2009	Cypress, Canada	Cancelled		
February 22, 2009	Stoneham, Canada	Benjamin Karl (AUT)	Siegfried Grabner (AUT)	Andreas Prommegger (AUT)
February 26, 2009	Sunday River, United States	Benjamin Karl (AUT)	Siegfried Grabner (AUT)	Jasey-Jay Anderson (CAN)
March 15, 2009	La Molina, Spain	Jasey-Jay Anderson (CAN)	Benjamin Karl (AUT)	Andreas Prommegger (AUT)
March 22, 2009	Valmalenco, Italy	Jasey-Jay Anderson (CAN)	Benjamin Karl (AUT)	Siegfried Grabner (AUT)

=== Snowboard Cross ===
Date	Place	Winner	Second	Third
September 13, 2008	Chapelco, Argentina	Pierre Vaultier (FRA)	Stian Sivertzen (NOR)	Mateusz Ligocki (POL)
December 20, 2008	Arosa, Switzerland	Seth Wescott (USA)	Markus Schairer (AUT)	David Speiser (GER)
January 10, 2009	Bad Gastein, Austria	Xavier de le Rue (FRA)	Michal Novotný (CZE)	Nate Holland (USA)
January 11, 2009	Bad Gastein, Austria	Damon Hayler (AUS)	Markus Schairer (AUT)	Mike Robertson (CAN)
February 13, 2009	Cypress, Canada	Markus Schairer (AUT)	Mike Robertson (CAN)	Seth Wescott (USA)
February 19, 2009	Stoneham, Canada	Markus Schairer (AUT)	Jonathan Cheever (USA)	Seth Wescott (USA)
February 28, 2009	Sunday River, United States	Graham Watanabe (USA)	Lukas Grüner (AUT)	Ross Powers (USA)
March 13, 2009	La Molina, Spain	Markus Schairer (AUT)	Nick Baumgartner (USA)	François Boivin (CAN)
March 20, 2009	Valmalenco, Italy	Michal Novotny (CZE)	Nick Baumgartner (USA)	David Speiser (GER)

=== Halfpipe ===
Date	Place	Winner	Second	Third
September 7, 2008	Cardrona, New Zealand	Kohhei Kudoh (JPN)	Ryoh Aono (JPN)	Crispin Lipscomb (CAN)
October 31, 2008	Saas-Fee, Switzerland	Janne Korpi (FIN)	Kohdai Watanabe (JPN)	Ilkka-Eemeli Laari (FIN)
January 14, 2009	Gujō, Gifu, Japan	Ryoh Aono (JPN)	Ben Mates (AUS)	Shi Wancheng (CHN)
February 7, 2009	Bardonecchia, Italy	Mathieu Crépel (FRA)	Nathan Johnstone (AUS)	Iouri Podladtchikov (SUI)
February 14, 2009	Cypress, Canada	Shaun White (USA)	Ryoh Aono (JPN)	Iouri Podladtchikov (SUI)
February 20, 2009	Stoneham, Canada	Jeff Batchelor (CAN)	Brad Martin (CAN)	Markus Malin (FIN)
March 14, 2009	La Molina, Spain	Markus Keller (SUI)	Louie Vito (USA)	Steven Fisher (USA)
March 21, 2009	Valmalenco, Italy	Gary Zebrowski (FRA)	Nathan Johnstone (AUS)	Zeng Xiaoye (CHN)

=== Slopestyle ===
Date	Place	Winner	Second	Third
February 5, 2009	Bardonecchia, Italy	Cancelled		

=== Big Air ===
Date	Place	Winner	Second	Third
October 25, 2008	London, United Kingdom	Peetu Piiroinen (FIN)	Stefan Gimpl (AUT)	Benedikt Nadig (SUI)
November 22, 2008	Stockholm, Sweden	Janne Korpi (FIN)	Chris Sörman (SWE)	Seppe Smits (BEL)
December 6, 2008	Grenoble, France	Mathieu Crépel (FRA)	Stefan Gimpl (AUT)	Jaakko Ruha (FIN)
February 21, 2009	Stoneham, Canada	Stefan Gimpl (AUT)	Marco Grilc (SLO)	Seppe Smits (BEL)
March 7, 2009	Moscow, Russia	Stefan Gimpl (AUT)	Thomas Franc (SUI)	Marco Grilc (SLO)

== Women ==
=== Parallel Slalom ===
Date	Place	Winner	Second	Third
October 10, 2008	Landgraaf, Netherlands	Doris Günther (AUT)	Heidi Neururer (AUT)	Nicolien Sauerbreij (NED)
December 21, 2008	Arosa, Switzerland	Heidi Neururer (AUT)	Michelle Gorgone (USA)	Isabella Laböck (GER)
January 7, 2009	Kreischberg, Austria	Amelie Kober (GER)	Tomoka Takeuchi (JPN)	Heidi Neururer (AUT)

=== Parallel Giant Slalom ===
Date	Place	Winner	Second	Third
December 14, 2008	Limone Piemonte, Italy	Doris Günther (AUT)	Kimiko Zakreski (CAN)	Anke Karstens (GER)
January 6, 2009	Kreischberg, Austria	Doris Günther (AUT)	Tomoka Takeuchi (JPN)	Claudia Riegler (AUT)
January 31, 2009	Bayrischzell, Germany	Doris Günther (AUT)	Amelie Kober (GER)	Nicolien Sauerbreij (NED)
February 15, 2009	Cypress, Canada	Cancelled		
February 22, 2009	Stoneham, Canada	Amelie Kober (GER)	Tomoka Takeuchi (JPN)	Doris Günther (AUT)
February 26, 2009	Sunday River, United States	Amelie Kober (GER)	Tomoka Takeuchi (JPN)	Alexa Loo (CAN)
March 15, 2009	La Molina, Spain	Amelie Kober (GER)	Marion Kreiner (AUT)	Michelle Gorgone (USA)
March 22, 2009	Valmalenco, Italy	Amelie Kober (GER)	Caroline Calve (CAN)	Doris Günther (AUT)

=== Snowboard Cross ===
Date	Place	Winner	Second	Third
September 13, 2008	Chapelco, Argentina	Lindsey Jacobellis (USA)	Mellie Francon (SUI)	Maëlle Ricker (CAN)
December 20, 2008	Arosa, Switzerland	Sandra Frei (SUI)	Helene Olafsen (NOR)	Nelly Moenne-Loccoz (FRA)
January 10, 2009	Bad Gastein, Austria	Sandra Frei (SUI)	Déborah Anthonioz (FRA)	Lindsey Jacobellis (USA)
January 11, 2009	Bad Gastein, Austria	Lindsey Jacobellis (USA)	Dominique Maltais (CAN)	Zoe Gillings (GBR)
February 13, 2009	Cypress, Canada	Lindsey Jacobellis (USA)	Olivia Nobs (USA)	Helene Olafsen (NOR)
February 19, 2009	Stoneham, Canada	Lindsey Jacobellis (USA)	Mellie Francon (SUI)	Maëlle Ricker (CAN)
February 28, 2009	Sunday River, United States	Maëlle Ricker (CAN)	Helene Olafsen (NOR)	Mellie Francon (SUI)
March 13, 2009	La Molina, Spain	Lindsey Jacobellis (USA)	Sandra Frei (SUI)	Dominique Maltais (CAN)
March 20, 2009	Valmalenco, Italy	Maëlle Ricker (CAN)	Dominique Maltais (CAN)	Zoe Gillings (GBR)

=== Halfpipe ===
Date	Place	Winner	Second	Third
September 7, 2008	Cardrona, New Zealand	Shiho Nakashima (JPN)	Sina Candrian (SUI)	Linn Haug (NOR)
October 31, 2008	Saas-Fee, Switzerland	Liu Jiayu (CHN)	Shiho Nakashima (JPN)	Sophie Rodriguez (FRA)
January 14, 2009	Gujō, Gifu, Japan	Liu Jiayu (CHN)	Sun Zhifeng (CHN)	Soko Yamaoka (JPN)
February 7, 2009	Bardonecchia, Italy	Kelly Clark (USA)	Hannah Teter (USA)	Gretchen Bleiler (USA)
February 14, 2009	Cypress, Canada	Kelly Clark (USA)	Liu Jiayu (CHN)	Hannah Teter (USA)
February 20, 2009	Stoneham, Canada	Soko Yamaoka (JPN)	Shiho Nakashima (JPN)	Rana Okada (JPN)
March 14, 2009	La Molina, Spain	Kjersti Buaas (NOR)	Liu Jiayu (CHN)	Elena Hight (USA)
March 21, 2009	Valmalenco, Italy	Liu Jiayu (CHN)	Holly Crawford (AUS)	Sarah Conrad (CAN)

=== Slopestyle ===
Date	Place	Winner	Second	Third
February 5, 2009	Bardonecchia, Italy	Cancelled		

== Standings ==
=== Men ===
==== Overall ====
Pos.		Points
1.	(Austria) Siegfried Grabner	5520
2.	(Austria) Markus Schairer	5450
3.	(Austria) Benjamin Karl	5000
4.	(Canada) Jasey-Jay Anderson	4882
5.	(Austria) Andreas Prommegger	4150
6.	(Austria) Stefan Gimpl	4100
7.	(Switzerland) Simon Schoch	4090
8.	(United States) Seth Wescott	3900
9.	(Canada) Matthew Morison	3670
10.	(Italy) Roland Fischnaller	3480

==== Parallel slalom ====
Pos.		Points
1.	(Austria) Siegfried Grabner	5520
2.	(Austria) Benjamin Karl	5000
3.	(Canada) Jasey-Jay Anderson	4710
4.	(Austria) Andreas Prommegger	4150
5.	(Switzerland) Simon Schoch	4090

==== Snowboardcross ====
Pos.		Points
1.	(Austria) Markus Schairer	5450
2.	(United States) Seth Wescott	3900
3.	(United States) Nick Baumgartner	3400
4.	(Czech Republic) Michal Novotny	3150
5.	(Canada) Mike Robertson	3020

==== Halfpipe ====
Pos.		Points
1.	(Japan) Ryoh Aono	2600
2.	(Australia) Nathan Johnstone	2310
3.	(France) Gary Zebrowski	2159
4.	(Switzerland) Sergio Berger	1850
5.	(Japan) Kazuumi Fujita	1850

==== Big Air ====
Pos.		Points
1.	(Austria) Stefan Gimpl	4100
2.	(Slovenia) Marco Grilc	1640
3.	(Finland) Peetu Piiroinen	1450
4.	(Belgium) Seppe Smits	1200
5.	(Switzerland) Thomas Franc	1145

=== Women ===
==== Overall ====
Pos.		Points
1.	(Austria) Doris Günther	7130
2.	(United States) Lindsey Jacobellis	6390
3.	(Germany) Amelie Kober	6232
4.	(Canada) Maëlle Ricker	5100
4.	(China) Liu Jiayu	5100
6.	(Japan) Tomoka Takeuchi	4670
7.	(Bulgaria) Aleksandra Zhekova	4560
8.	(Switzerland) Sandra Frei	4510
9.	(Norway) Helene Olafsen	4202
10.	(Canada) Dominique Maltais	4080

==== Parallel slalom ====
Pos.		Points
1.	(Germany) Amelie Kober	6232
2.	(Austria) Doris Günther	6070
3.	(Japan) Tomoka Takeuchi	4670
4.	(Austria) Claudia Riegler	3860
5.	(Netherlands) Nicolien Sauerbreij	3630

==== Snowboardcross ====
Pos.		Points
1.	(United States) Lindsey Jacobellis	6390
2.	(Canada) Maëlle Ricker	5100
3.	(Switzerland) Sandra Frei	4510
4.	(Canada) Dominique Maltais	4080
5.	(Norway) Helene Olafsen	3670

==== Halfpipe ====
Pos.		Points
1.	(China) Liu Jiayu	5100
2.	(Japan) Shiho Nakashima	3320
3.	(Japan) Soko Yamaoka	2270
3.	(France) Sophie Rodriguez	2270
5.	(Norway) Kjersti Buaas	2220

== Podium table by nation ==
Rank	Nation	Gold	Silver	Bronze	Total
1	Austria	16	11	7	34
2	United States	10	8	10	28
3	Canada	6	7	10	23
4	France	5	2	3	10
5	Germany	5	1	5	11
6	Japan	4	9	2	15
7	Switzerland	4	6	4	14
8	China	3	3	2	8
9	Finland	3	0	3	6
10	Australia	1	4	0	5
11	Norway	1	3	2	6
12	Czech Republic	1	1	0	2
13	Slovenia	0	2	3	5
14	Italy	0	1	1	2
15	Sweden	0	1	0	1
16	Belgium	0	0	2	2
16	Great Britain	0	0	2	2
16	Netherlands	0	0	2	2
19	Poland	0	0	1	1
Totals (19 entries)		59	59	59	177
