= 2010–11 FIS Snowboard World Cup =

International snowboarding competition

2010–11 Snowboarding World Cup
Winners
- Speed overall men's: Benjamin Karl (AUT)
- Speed overall women's: Ekaterina Tudegesheva (RUS)
- Freestyle overall men's: Nathan Johnstone (AUS)
- Freestyle overall women's: Cai Xuetong (CHN)
- Parallel slalom men's: Benjamin Karl (AUT)
- Parallel slalom women's: Ekaterina Tudegesheva (RUS)
- Snowboard cross men's: Alex Pullin (AUS)
- Snowboard cross women's: Dominique Maltais (CAN)
- Halfpipe men's: Nathan Johnstone (AUS)
- Halfpipe women's: Cai Xuetong (CHN)
- Big Air/Slopestyle men's: Clemens Schattschneider (AUT)
- Slopestyle women's: Allyson Carroll (USA)/Katarzyna Rusin (POL)

Competitions
- Venues: 18
- Individual: 59
- Team: 1

The 2010–11 FIS Snowboard World Cup was a multi race tournament over a season for snowboarding. The season started on 10 October 2010 and ended on 27 March 2011. The World Cup was organised by the FIS which also run world cups and championships in cross-country skiing, ski jumping, Nordic combined, alpine skiing, and freestyle skiing. The snowboarding world cup consisted of the parallel slalom, snowboard cross and the halfpipe. The men's side of the world cup also consisted of a big air competition.

== Men ==
=== Parallel Slalom ===
Date	Place	Classification	Winner	Second	Third	Report
October 10, 2010	Landgraaf, Netherlands	Slalom	Andreas Prommegger (AUT)	Roland Fischnaller (ITA)	Aaron March (ITA)	
December 10, 2010	Limone Piemonte, Italy	Giant Slalom	Benjamin Karl (AUT)	Andreas Prommegger (AUT)	Manuel Veith (AUT)	
December 11, 2010	Limone Piemonte, Italy	Slalom	Roland Fischnaller (ITA)	Aaron March (ITA)	Roland Haldi (SUI)	
December 16, 2010	Telluride, United States	Giant Slalom	Rok Flander (SLO)	Kaspar Flütsch (SUI)	Manuel Veith (AUT)	
January 9, 2011	Bad Gastein, Austria	Slalom	Benjamin Karl (AUT)	Aaron March (ITA)	Simon Schoch (SUI)	
February 9, 2011	Yongpyong, South Korea	Giant Slalom	Benjamin Karl (AUT)	Siegfried Grabner (AUT)	Aaron March (ITA)	
February 20, 2011	Stoneham, Canada	Giant Slalom	Benjamin Karl (AUT)	Andreas Prommegger (AUT)	Matthew Morison (CAN)	
March 5, 2011	Moscow, Russia	Slalom	Roland Fischnaller (ITA)	Rok Marguč (SLO)	Simon Schoch (SUI)	
March 19, 2011	Valmalenco, Italy	Giant Slalom	Sylvain Dufour (FRA)	Andreas Prommegger (AUT)	Roland Haldi (SUI)	
March 27, 2011	Arosa, Switzerland	Giant Slalom	Andreas Prommegger (AUT)	Roland Fischnaller (ITA)	Nevin Galmarini (SUI)	

=== Snowboard Cross ===
Date	Place	Winner	Second	Third	Report
December 7, 2010	Lech am Arlberg, Austria	Nate Holland (USA)	Tom Velisek (CAN)	Mario Fuchs (AUT)	
December 8, 2010	Lech am Arlberg, Austria	Luca Matteotti (ITA)	Alex Pullin (AUS)	Paul-Henri de Le Rue (FRA)	
December 17, 2010	Telluride, United States	Pierre Vaultier (FRA)	Seth Wescott (USA)	Alex Pullin (AUS)	
December 18, 2010	Telluride, United States (Team)	Luca Matteotti (ITA); Alberto Schiavon (ITA)	Jonathan Cheever (USA); Alex Deibold (USA)	Nick Baumgartner (USA); Jayson Hale (USA)	
~~February 8, 2011~~	Yongpyong, South Korea	Cancelled due to unsafe course conditions; rescheduled to March 24 in Arosa			
February 17, 2011	Stoneham, Canada	Nick Baumgartner (USA)	Jonathan Cheever (USA)	David Speiser (GER)	
March 18, 2011	Valmalenco, Italy	Alberto Schiavon (ITA)	Jonathan Cheever (USA)	Nate Holland (USA)	
March 24, 2011 (Note: Rescheduled from 8 February 2011 in Yongpyong.)	Arosa, Switzerland	Seth Wescott (USA)	Pierre Vaultier (FRA)	Paul-Henri de Le Rue (FRA)	
March 25, 2011	Arosa, Switzerland	Alex Pullin (AUS)	Luca Matteotti (ITA)	Nick Baumgartner (USA)	

=== Halfpipe ===
Date	Place	Winner	Second	Third	Report
November 4, 2010	Saas-Fee, Switzerland	Tore Viken Holvik (NOR)	Ryō Aono (JPN)	Mathieu Crépel (FRA)	
February 13, 2011	Yabuli, China	Nathan Johnstone (AUS)	Zhang Yiwei (CHN)	Shi Wancheng (CHN)	
February 18, 2011	Stoneham, Canada	Ryō Aono (JPN)	Taku Hiraoka (JPN)	Fujita Kazuumi (JPN)	
February 26, 2011	Calgary, Canada	Ryō Aono (JPN)	Nathan Johnstone (AUS)	Zhang Yiwei (CHN)	
March 11, 2011	Bardonecchia, Italy	Nathan Johnstone (AUS)	Johann Baisamy (FRA)	Arthur Longo (FRA)	
March 26, 2011	Arosa, Switzerland	Iouri Podladtchikov (SUI)	Jan Scherrer (SUI)	Patrick Burgener (SUI)	

=== Big Air ===
Date	Place	Winner	Second	Third	Report
October 30, 2010	London, United Kingdom	Marko Grilc (SLO)	Staale Sandbech (NOR)	Seppe Smits (BEL)	
November 20, 2010	Stockholm, Sweden	Sebastien Toutant (CAN)	Petja Piiroinen (FIN)	Patrick Burgener (SUI)	
December 3, 2010	Seoul, South Korea	Cancelled			
January 26, 2011	Denver, United States	Rocco van Straten (NED)	Zachary Stone (CAN)	Michael Macho (AUT)	
February 19, 2011	Stoneham, Canada	Sebastien Toutant (CAN)	Matts Kulisek (CAN)	Stefan Falkeis (AUT)	

=== Slopestyle ===
Date	Place	Winner	Second	Third
February 26, 2011	Calgary, Canada	Clemens Schattschneider (AUT)	Robby Ballhary (CAN)	Zachary Stone (CAN)
March 11, 2011	Bardonecchia, Italy	Alexey Sobolev (RUS)	Milu Multhaup-Appleton (NZL)	Clemens Schattschneider (AUT)

== Ladies ==
=== Parallel Slalom ===
Date	Place	Classification	Winner	Second	Third	Report
October 10, 2010	Landgraaf, Netherlands	Slalom	Ekaterina Tudegesheva (RUS)	Heidi Neururer (AUT)	Alena Zavarzina (RUS)	
December 10, 2010	Limone Piemonte, Italy	Giant Slalom	Ekaterina Tudegesheva (RUS)	Alena Zavarzina (RUS)	Svetlana Boldykova (RUS)	
December 11, 2010	Limone Piemonte, Italy	Slalom	Patrizia Kummer (SUI)	Fränzi Mägert-Kohli (SUI)	Ekaterina Ilyukhina (RUS)	
December 16, 2010	Telluride, United States	Giant Slalom	Fränzi Mägert-Kohli (SUI)	Isabella Laböck (GER)	Ekaterina Tudegesheva (RUS)	
January 9, 2011	Bad Gastein, Austria	Slalom	Ekaterina Tudegesheva (RUS)	Marion Kreiner (AUT)	Claudia Riegler (AUT)	
February 9, 2011	Yongpyong, South Korea	Giant Slalom	Marion Kreiner (AUT)	Fränzi Mägert-Kohli (SUI)	Svetlana Boldykova (RUS)	
February 20, 2011	Stoneham, Canada	Giant Slalom	Ekaterina Tudegesheva (RUS)	Claudia Riegler (AUT)	Marion Kreiner (AUT)	
March 5, 2011	Moscow, Russia	Slalom	Ekaterina Tudegesheva (RUS)	Tomoka Takeuchi (JPN)	Doris Günther (AUT)	
March 19, 2011	Valmalenco, Italy	Giant Slalom	Ekaterina Tudegesheva (RUS)	Isabella Laböck (GER)	Julia Dujmovits (AUT)	
March 27, 2011	Arosa, Switzerland	Giant Slalom	Fränzi Mägert-Kohli (SUI)	Ekaterina Tudegesheva (RUS)	Julia Dujmovits (AUT)	

=== Snowboard Cross ===
Date	Place	Winner	Second	Third	Report
December 7, 2010	Lech am Arlberg, Austria	Dominique Maltais (CAN)	Maëlle Ricker (CAN)	Yuka Fujimori (JPN)	
December 8, 2010	Lech am Arlberg, Austria	Dominique Maltais (CAN)	Maëlle Ricker (CAN)	Aleksandra Zhekova (BUL)	
December 17, 2010	Telluride, United States	Dominique Maltais (CAN)	Aleksandra Zhekova (BUL)	Maëlle Ricker (CAN)	
December 18, 2010	Telluride, United States (Team)	Helene Olafsen (NOR); Aleksandra Zhekova (BUL)	Susanne Moll (AUT); Maria Ramberger (AUT)	Callan Chythlook-Sifsof (USA); Lindsey Jacobellis (USA)	
~~February 8, 2011~~	Yongpyong, South Korea	Cancelled due to unsafe course conditions; rescheduled to March 24 in Arosa			
February 17, 2011	Stoneham, Canada	Lindsey Jacobellis (USA)	Dominique Maltais (CAN)	Deborah Anthonioz (FRA)	
March 18, 2011	Valmalenco, Italy	Lindsey Jacobellis (USA)	Eva Samkova (CZE)	Deborah Anthonioz (FRA)	
March 24, 2011	Arosa, Switzerland	Aleksandra Zhekova (BUL)	Callan Chythlook-Sifsof (USA)	Zoe Gillings (GBR)	
March 25, 2011	Arosa, Switzerland	Aleksandra Zhekova (BUL)	Lindsey Jacobellis (USA)	Nelly Moenne Loccoz (FRA)	

=== Halfpipe ===
Date	Place	Winner	Second	Third	Report
November 4, 2010	Saas-Fee, Switzerland	Cai Xuetong (CHN)	Sun Zhifeng (CHN)	Ursina Haller (SUI)	
February 13, 2011	Yabuli, China	Liu Jiayu (CHN)	Cai Xuetong (CHN)	Li Shuang (CHN)	
February 18, 2011	Stoneham, Canada	Cai Xuetong (CHN)	Holly Crawford (AUS)	Haruna Matsumoto (JPN)	
February 26, 2011	Calgary, Canada	Cai Xuetong (CHN)	Holly Crawford (AUS)	Haruna Matsumoto (JPN)	
March 11, 2011	Bardonecchia, Italy	Holly Crawford (AUS)	Mirabelle Thovex (FRA)	Paulina Ligocka-Andrzejewska (POL)	
March 26, 2011	Arosa, Switzerland	Queralt Castellet (ESP)	Holly Crawford (AUS)	Cai Xuetong (CHN)	

=== Slopestyle ===
Date	Place	Winner	Second	Third	Report
February 26, 2011	Calgary, Canada	Allyson Carroll (USA)	Brooke Voigt (CAN)	Pia Meusburger (AUT)	
March 11, 2011	Bardonecchia, Italy	Katarzyna Rusin (POL)	Anja Štefan (CRO)	Lou Chabelard (FRA)	

== Standings ==
=== Speed Overall Men ===
Pos	Athlete	Points
1.	Benjamin Karl (AUT)	4950
2.	Andreas Prommegger (AUT)	4850
3.	Roland Fischnaller (ITA)	4550
4.	Aaron March (ITA)	3450
5.	Alex Pullin (AUS)	3270
6.	Pierre Vaultier (FRA)	3210
7.	Simon Schoch (SUI)	2870
8.	Jonathan Cheever (USA)	2690
9.	Rok Flander (SLO)	2670
10.	Rok Marguč (SLO)	2580

=== Speed Overall Women ===
Pos	Athlete	Points
1.	Ekaterina Tudegesheva (RUS)	6000
2.	Dominique Maltais (CAN)	4800
3.	Fränzi Mägert-Kohli (SUI)	4600
4.	Aleksandra Zhekova (BUL)	4040
5.	Marion Kreiner (AUT)	3700
6.	Lindsey Jacobellis (USA)	3610
7.	Isabella Laböck (GER)	3170
8.	Claudia Riegler (AUT)	3060
9.	Julia Dujmovits (AUT)	2800
10.	Doris Günther (AUT)	2710

=== Freestyle Overall Men ===
Pos	Athlete	Points
1.	Nathan Johnstone (AUS)	3510
2.	Clemens Schattschneider (AUT)	2960
3.	Ryō Aono (JPN)	2800
4.	Sebastien Toutant (CAN)	2220
5.	Rocco van Straten (NED)	2090
6.	Stefan Falkeis (AUT)	1770
7.	Adrian Krainer (AUT)	1760
8.	Dimi de Jong (NED)	1710
9.	Michael Macho (AUT)	1646
10.	Arthur Longo (FRA)	1600

=== Freestyle Overall Women ===
Pos	Athlete	Points
1.	Cai Xuetong (CHN)	4400
2.	Holly Crawford (AUS)	3900
3.	Sun Zhifeng (CHN)	2300
4.	Mirabelle Thovex (FRA)	2270
5.	Anne Sophie Pellissier (FRA)	1960
6.	Nadja Purtschert (SUI)	1730
7.	Xu Xiujuan (CHN)	1460
8.	Pia Meusburger (AUT)	1450
9.	Sophie Rodriguez (FRA)	1400
10.	Katarzyna Rusin (POL)	1320

=== Parallel Slalom Men ===
Pos	Athlete	Points
1.	Benjamin Karl (AUT)	5790
2.	Andreas Prommegger (AUT)	5740
3.	Roland Fischnaller (ITA)	5420
4.	Aaron March (ITA)	3890
5.	Simon Schoch (SUI)	3450

=== Parallel Slalom Women ===
Pos	Athlete	Points
1.	Ekaterina Tudegesheva (RUS)	7690
2.	Fränzi Mägert-Kohli (SUI)	5770
3.	Marion Kreiner (AUT)	4540
4.	Claudia Riegler (AUT)	3900
5.	Isabella Labök (GER)	3510

=== Snowboardcross Men ===
Pos	Athlete	Points
1.	Alex Pullin (AUS)	3270
2.	Pierre Vaultier (FRA)	3210
3.	Jonathan Cheever (USA)	2690
4.	Luca Matteotti (ITA)	2480
5.	Markus Schairer (AUT)	2160

=== Snowboardcross Women ===
Pos	Athlete	Points
1.	Dominique Maltais (CAN)	4800
2.	Aleksandra Zhekova (BUL)	4040
3.	Lindsey Jacobellis (USA)	3610
4.	Deborah Anthonioz (FRA)	2680
5.	Callan Chythlook-Sifsof (USA)	2210

=== Halfpipe Men ===
Pos	Athlete	Points
1.	Nathan Johnstone (AUS)	3510
2.	Ryō Aono (JPN)	2800
3.	Arthur Longo (FRA)	1600
4.	Zhang Yiwei (CHN)	1470
5.	Aluan Ricciardi (FRA)	1350

=== Halfpipe Women ===
Pos	Athlete	Points
1.	Cai Xuetong (CHN)	4400
2.	Holly Crawford (AUS)	3900
3.	Sun Zhifeng (CHN)	2300
4.	Mirabelle Thovex (FRA)	2270
5.	Anne Sophie Pellissier (FRA)	1960

=== Big Air/Slopestyle Men ===
Pos	Athlete	Points
1.	Clemens Schattschneider (AUT)	2960
2.	Sebastien Toutant (CAN)	2220
3.	Rocco van Straten (NED)	1845
4.	Stefan Falkeis (AUT)	1770
5.	Adrian Krainer (AUT)	1676

=== Slopestyle Women ===
Pos	Athlete	Points
1.	Allyson Carroll (USA)	1000
1.	Katarzyna Rusin (POL)	1000
3.	Anja Štefan (CRO)	800
3.	Brooke Voigt (CAN)	800
5.	Pia Meusburger (AUT)	600

== Medal table ==
Rank	Nation	Gold	Silver	Bronze	Total
1	Austria	8	8	12	28
2	Russia	7	2	5	14
3	United States	6	6	4	16
4	Canada	5	8	3	16
5	Italy	5	5	2	12
6	Australia	4	5	1	10
7	Switzerland	4	4	8	16
8	China	4	3	4	11
9	Bulgaria	2.5	1	1	4.5
10	France	2	3	8	13
11	Japan	2	3	4	9
12	Slovenia	2	1	0	3
13	Norway	1.5	1	0	2.5
14	Poland	1	0	1	2
15	Netherlands	1	0	0	1
15	Spain	1	0	0	1
17	Germany	0	2	1	3
18	Croatia	0	1	0	1
18	Czech Republic	0	1	0	1
18	Finland	0	1	0	1
18	New Zealand	0	1	0	1
22	Belgium	0	0	1	1
22	Great Britain	0	0	1	1
Totals (23 entries)		56	56	56	168
