= Yekaterina Tudegesheva =

Russian snowboarder

Yekaterina Tudegesheva Екатерина Тудегешева
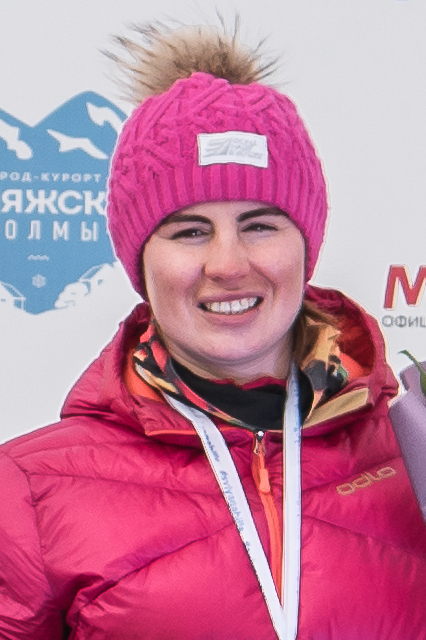

Personal information
- Born: Yekaterina Nikolayevna Tudegesheva; 30 October 1987 (age 39) Rostov-on-Don, Soviet Union
- Height: 162 cm (5 ft 4 in)
- Weight: 65 kg (143 lb)

Sport
- Country: Russia
- Sport: Snowboarding
- Events: Parallel Slalom, Parallel Giant Slalom, Snowboard Cross

Achievements and titles
- World finals: Gold medal in parallel giant slalom at Arosa 2007; Gold medal in parallel slalom at Stoneham 2013; Bronze medal in parallel slalom at Gangwon 2009; Bronze medal in parallel giant slalom at Sierra Nevada 2017
- Highest world ranking: 1st in Parallel World Cup (2011)
Medal record
Women's snowboarding
Representing Russia
International snowboarding competitions
Event	1st	2nd	3rd
Olympic Games	0	0	0
World Championships	2	0	2
Junior World Championships	2	1	0
Total	4	1	2
World Championships
Gold medal – first place	2007 Arosa	Parallel Giant Slalom
Gold medal – first place	2013 Stoneham	Parallel Slalom
Bronze medal – third place	2009 Gangwon	Parallel Slalom
Bronze medal – third place	2017 Sierra Nevada	Parallel Giant Slalom
Junior World Championships
Gold medal – first place	2006 Vivaldi Park	Parallel Giant Slalom
Gold medal – first place	2007 Bad Gastein	Parallel Giant Slalom
Silver medal – second place	2007 Bad Gastein	Parallel Slalom

Yekaterina Nikolayevna Tudegesheva (Russian: Екатерина Николаевна Тудегешева, also spelled Ekaterina; born 30 October 1987 in Rostov-on-Don) is a Russian professional snowboarder. She is an ethnic Shor.

== World Cup results ==
All results are sourced from the International Ski Federation (FIS).

=== Season titles ===
- 3 titles – (1 speed overall, 1 parallel overall, 1 parallel slalom)

Season	Discipline
2011	Speed Overall
2011	Parallel Overall
2018	Parallel Slalom

=== Season standings ===
Season	Age	Parallel Overall	Parallel Slalom	Parallel Giant Slalom	Snowboard Cross	Speed Overall^{[a]}	Overall^{[b]}
2004	16	59	—N/a	—N/a	25	—N/a	23
2005	17	30	—N/a	—N/a	42	—N/a	—N/a
2006	18	25	—N/a	—N/a	36	—N/a	59
2007	19	7	—N/a	—N/a	–	—N/a	11
2008	20	10	—N/a	—N/a	–	—N/a	19
2009	21	19	—N/a	—N/a	–	—N/a	43
2010	22	5	—N/a	—N/a	–	—N/a	8
2011	23	1	—N/a	—N/a	–	1	—N/a
2012	24	5	—N/a	—N/a	–	—N/a	—N/a
2013	25	4	5	4	–	—N/a	—N/a
2014	26	4	3	6	–	—N/a	—N/a
2015	27	21	21	19	–	—N/a	—N/a
2016	28	2	2	2	–	—N/a	—N/a
2017	29	11	13	9	–	—N/a	—N/a
2018	30	5	1	6	–	—N/a	—N/a

a. ^{1} Includes parallel slalom, parallel giant slalom and snowboard cross events. Athlete's best six results are counted for the overall classification.
b. ^{1} Includes all World Cup snowboarding events. Athlete's best six results are counted for the overall classification.

=== Race Podiums ===
- 12 wins – (5 PSL, 7 PGS)
- 27 podiums – (10 PSL, 17 PGS)

Season	Date	Location	Discipline	Place
2006–07	13 December 2006	San Viglio di Marebbe, Italy	Parallel Giant Slalom	2nd
2006–07	20 December 2006	Bad Gastein, Austria	Parallel Slalom	1st
2007–08	8 December 2007	Limone Piemonte, Italy	Parallel Giant Slalom	2nd
2007–08	24 February 2008	Gujō-Gifu, Japan	Parallel Giant Slalom	3rd
2007–08	8 March 2008	Stoneham, Canada	Parallel Giant Slalom	2nd
2010–11	7 January 2010	Nendaz, Switzerland	Parallel Giant Slalom	1st
2010–11	21 March 2010	La Molina, Spain	Parallel Giant Slalom	1st
2010–11	10 October 2010	Landgraaf, Netherlands	Parallel Slalom	1st
2010–11	12 October 2010	Limone Piemonte, Italy	Parallel Giant Slalom	1st
2010–11	16 October 2010	Telluride, United States	Parallel Giant Slalom	3rd
2010–11	9 January 2011	Bad Gastein, Austria	Parallel Slalom	1st
2010–11	20 February 2011	Stoneham, Canada	Parallel Giant Slalom	1st
2010–11	5 March 2011	Moscow, Russia	Parallel Slalom	1st
2010–11	19 March 2011	Valmalenco, Italy	Parallel Giant Slalom	1st
2010–11	27 March 2011	Arosa, Switzerland	Parallel Giant Slalom	2nd
2011–12	13 October 2011	Landgraaf, Netherlands	Parallel Slalom	2nd
2011–12	13 January 2012	Jauerling, Austria	Parallel Slalom	2nd
2011–12	28 January 2012	Sudenfeld, Germany	Parallel Giant Slalom	3rd
2011–12	22 February 2012	Stoneham, Canada	Parallel Giant Slalom	1st
2012–13	8 February 2013	Rogla, Slovenia	Parallel Giant Slalom	1st
2012–13	23 February 2013	Moscow, Russia	Parallel Slalom	3rd
2013–14	13 December 2013	Carezza, Italy	Parallel Giant Slalom	3rd
2013–14	14 December 2013	Carezza, Italy	Parallel Slalom	2nd
2015–16	12 December 2015	Carezza, Italy	Parallel Giant Slalom	3rd
2015–16	8 January 2016	Bad Gastein, Austria	Parallel Slalom	1st
2015–16	23 January 2016	Rogla, Slovenia	Parallel Giant Slalom	3rd
2017–18	12 January 2018	Bad Gastein, Austria	Parallel Slalom	2nd
