= Snowboarding at the 2007 Asian Winter Games – Women's halfpipe =

Women's halfpipe at the 2007 Asian Winter Games
- Venue: Beida Lake Skiing Resort
- Dates: 29 January 2007
- Competitors: 11 from 4 nations

Medalists
gold medal	Shiho Nakashima	Japan
silver medal	Soko Yamaoka	Japan
bronze medal	Liu Jiayu	China

The women's snowboard halfpipe competition at the 2007 Asian Winter Games in Changchun, China was held on 29 January at the Beida Lake Skiing Resort.

== Schedule ==
All times are China Standard Time (UTC+08:00)

Date	Time	Event
Monday, 29 January 2007	10:00	Qualification run 1
Monday, 29 January 2007	10:30	Qualification run 1
Monday, 29 January 2007	11:00	Final run 1
Monday, 29 January 2007	11:30	Final run 2

== Results ==
=== Qualification run 1 ===
Rank	Athlete	Score
1	Soko Yamaoka (JPN)	41.4
2	Liu Jiayu (CHN)	38.5
3	Sun Zhifeng (CHN)	33.3
4	Shiho Nakashima (JPN)	27.7
5	Zhang Xinyue (CHN)	23.4
6	Chen Xu (CHN)	17.8
7	Song Jin-ya (KOR)	16.8
8	Lee Mi-yeon (KOR)	12.0
9	Kang Gi-hye (KOR)	9.6
10	Jang In-hyung (KOR)	8.1
11	Marwa El-Hage (LIB)	5.2

=== Qualification run 2 ===
Rank	Athlete	Score
1	Zhang Xinyue (CHN)	31.4
2	Shiho Nakashima (JPN)	24.7
3	Kang Gi-hye (KOR)	22.5
4	Song Jin-ya (KOR)	22.2
5	Jang In-hyung (KOR)	18.6
6	Chen Xu (CHN)	15.1
7	Lee Mi-yeon (KOR)	14.7
8	Marwa El-Hage (LIB)	6.5

=== Final ===
Rank	Athlete	Run 1	Run 2	Best
1st place, gold medalist(s)	Shiho Nakashima (JPN)	38.5	44.2	44.2
2nd place, silver medalist(s)	Soko Yamaoka (JPN)	34.9	41.7	41.7
3rd place, bronze medalist(s)	Liu Jiayu (CHN)	27.4	38.3	38.3
4	Sun Zhifeng (CHN)	36.5	35.1	36.5
5	Zhang Xinyue (CHN)	31.4	16.0	31.4
6	Kang Gi-hye (KOR)	20.0	19.6	20.0
