= Qualified (company) =

- Type: Private
- Industry: Artificial intelligence, SaaS, Sales technology
- Founded: 2018
- Founders: Kraig Swensrud, Sean Whiteley
- Headquarters: San Francisco, U.S.
- Area served: Worldwide
- Key people: Kraig Swensrud (CEO), Sean Whiteley (President)
- Website: www.qualified.com

Qualified is an American software company headquartered in San Francisco, California. The company's platform is focused on Salesforce users, providing features to capture website traffic, qualify prospects, and accelerate pipeline creation. Its flagship AI-powered product, Piper, acts as a digital sales development representative (SDR), engaging inbound leads and booking meetings autonomously.

== History ==
Qualified was founded in 2018 by former Salesforce executives Kraig Swensrud and Sean Whiteley.

In August 2020, the company raised $12 million in a Series A round led by Norwest Venture Partners, with participation from Redpoint Ventures and Salesforce Ventures. The investment brought Qualified's total funding to $17 million.

In May 2021, Qualified secured $51 million in Series B funding, led by Salesforce Ventures with participation from Norwest and Redpoint.

In April 2022, the company announced a $95 million Series C round led by Sapphire Ventures, with major participation from Tiger Global, Salesforce Ventures, Norwest, and Redpoint Ventures.

== Products ==
Qualified positions its platform for Salesforce customers, providing native CRM integration along with features such as real-time website engagement, conversation intelligence, and analytics.

== Piper the AI SDR Agent ==
Qualified develops a single AI sales development representative (AI SDR) called Piper. Piper is focused on inbound pipeline generation, engaging website visitors in real time, qualifying prospects, and booking meetings with sales teams. The product is positioned as part of the company's broader Salesforce-native platform, automating the first stages of the sales funnel.

== Key people ==
Qualified's co-founder and CEO, Kraig Swensrud, previously founded the customer feedback platform GetFeedback, which was acquired by SurveyMonkey in 2014. Before that, he was Chief Marketing Officer at Salesforce, reporting directly to CEO Marc Benioff.
