= Shiho Nakashima =

Japanese snowboarder (born 1978)

Personal information
- Born: August 12, 1978 (age 47) Yōrō, Gifu

Sport
- Country: Japan
- Sport: Snowboarding
- Event: Half-Pipe
- Retired: 2010
Medal record
Women's snowboarding
Representing Japan
Asian Games
Gold medal – first place	2007 Changchun	Halfpipe

Shiho Nakashima (中島 志保, Nakashima Shiho; born August 12, 1978 in Yōrō, Gifu) is a Japanese snowboarder who competed at the 2006 Winter Olympics and had two World Cup victories. She also competed at the 2010 Winter Olympics in Women's Half-pipe. Her motto is "Continuity is power."

== Career ==
Nakashima's first appearances at FIS races started in January 2003, already in March of that year she started for the first time in the World Cup in Sapporo and became sixteenth. She then finished second in the Japanese Championships. In the following two years she took part in the World Cup, but missed the top 10, while she often achieved good results in the low-class FIS races.

In the World Cup, Nakashima achieved the first successes in their special discipline Half-pipe in 2005, when it came several times under the top ten in March and finally triumphed for the first time in December . Having demonstrated her good performances during the 2005/2006 season, she was able to compete in the Japanese team at the 2006 Olympics in Turin, where she also became ninth. After the successful winter 2005/2006, where she became a Japanese champion on the halfpipe and fourth in the Halfpipe World Cup, Nakashima started the 2006/07 season once again and achieved several good placings in the World Cup. At the 2007 Winter Asian Games in Changchun, she won the gold medal in the halfpipe. At the end of the season, she was the sixth place in the halfpipe and the 27th place in the overall World Cup. In the 2007/08 season, they only played three times in the World Cup, but again reached top 10 finishes. Nakashima won the first World Cup of the 2008/09 season . In the further course of the season, she came second in Saas-Fee and in Stoneham, reaching the 16th place in the overall World Cup and the second place in the Halfpipe World Cup. At the 2009 Snowboard World Championships in Gangwon, she finished fifth. The following year, she became a Japanese champion in the halfpipe. Her last international competition, she completed at the 2010 Winter Olympics in Vancouver . There she came in 13th place.

== Achievements ==
=== Olympic Games ===
Place	Day	Year	place	Competition	Winner
9.	February 13	2006	(Italy) Turin	halfpipe	(United States) Hannah Teter
13.	February 18	2010	(Canada) Vancouver	halfpipe	(United Kingdom) Torah Bright

=== World Championship ===
Place	Day	Year	place	Competition	Winner
7.	January 22	2005	(Canada) Whistler	halfpipe	(France) Doriane Vidal
4.	20 January	2007	(Switzerland) Arosa	halfpipe	(Switzerland) Manuela Pesko
5.	January 23	2009	(Japan) Gangwon	halfpipe	(China) Liu Jiayu

=== World Cup ===
==== Places in general classification ====
- 2002/03 season - -
- 2003/04 season- -
- 2004/05 season - -
- 2005/06 season - 15.
- 2006/07 season - 27.
- 2007/08 season - 58.
- 2008/09 season - 16.
- 2009/10 season - 86.

==== Places on the podium ====
1. (Canada) Whistler - December 10, 2005 (Halfpipe) - 1st place
2. (Austria) Kreischberg - January 9, 2006 (Halfpipe) - 3rd place
3. (Japan) Furano - March 18, 2006 (Halfpipe) - 3rd place
4. (Japan) Furano - February 18, 2007 (Halfpipe) - 3rd place
5. (New Zealand) Cardrona - September 7, 2008 (Halfpipe) - 1st place
6. (Switzerland) Saas-Fee - October 31, 2008 (Halfpipe) - 2nd place
7. (Canada) Stoneham - February 20, 2009 (Halfpipe) - 2nd place
