= Anja Štefan (snowboarder) =

Croatian snowboarder (born 1988)

Personal information
- Born: 3 August 1988 (age 37) Rijeka
- Height: 1.56 m (5 ft 1 1/2 in)

Sport
- Country: Croatia
- Sport: Snowboarding

Anja Štefan (Rijeka, 3 August 1988) is a Croatian snowboarder. Most recently she won the silver medal in the Slopestyle at the 2010–11 FIS Snowboard World Cup.
