= Kimiko Zakreski =

Canadian snowboarder

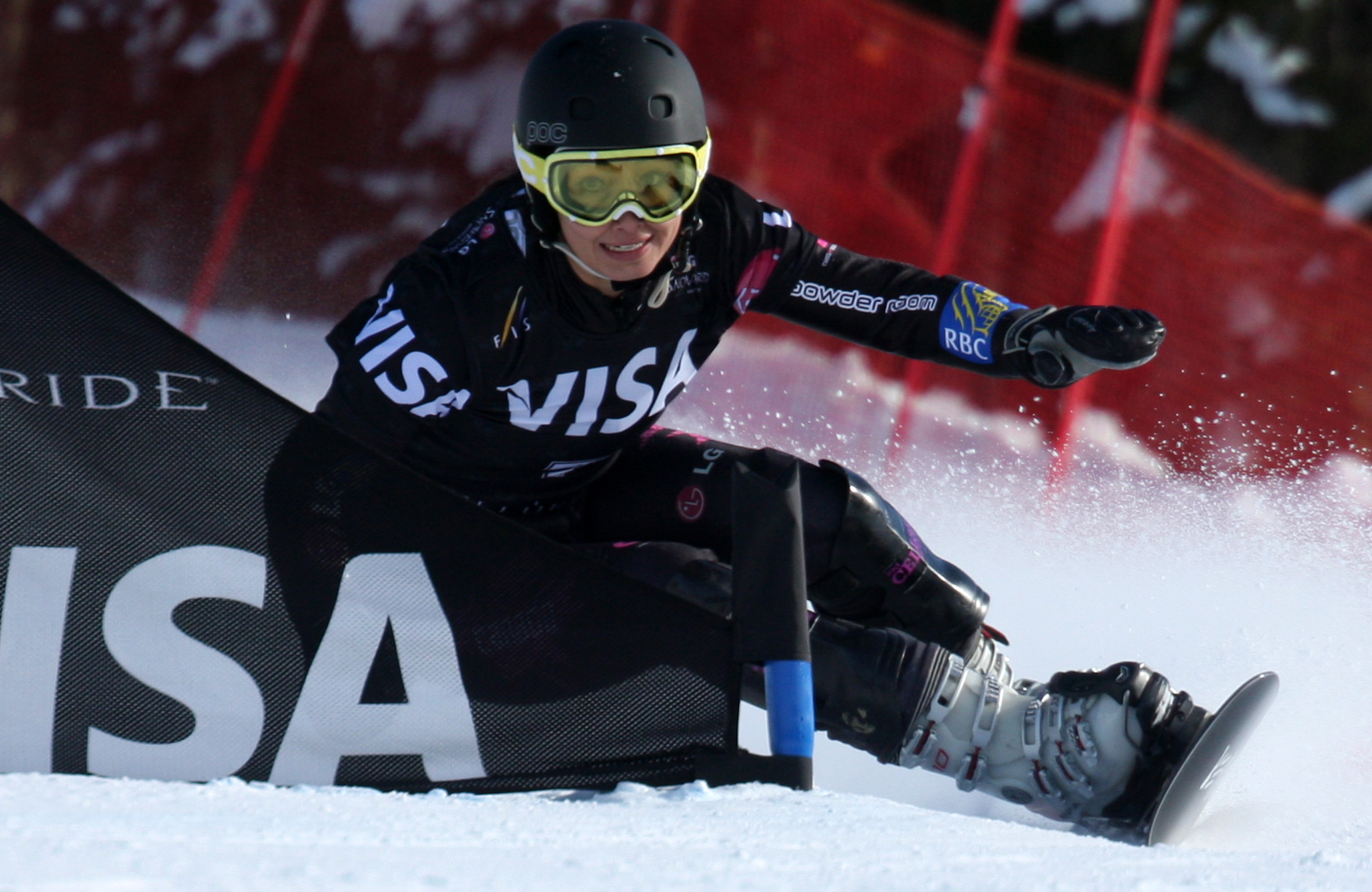
- Kimiko Zakreski at World Cup, Telluride, December 17, 2009

Personal information
- Born: December 31, 1983 (age 42) St. Albert, Alberta, Canada
- Website: www.kimi.ca

Sport
- Country: Canada
- Sport: Snowboarding

Kimiko Zakreski (born December 31, 1983, in St. Albert, Alberta) is a Canadian snowboarder who currently resides in Halifax, Nova Scotia. Zakreski competes in alpine disciplines, Parallel GS and Parallel Slalom.

She was featured in the MTV Canada series Summer Sessions with national riders like Dominique Vallee and close friend Michael Lambert. She is also featured in the follow-up MTV show Over the Bolts which followed the Canadian national team over the season. Zakreski and her friendship with Lambert is one of the main "storylines" followed on the show.

Zakreski got her first World Cup podium on the 2008-09 FIS Snowboard World Cup tour, finishing second in Limone Piemonte, Italy. In December during the 2009-10 FIS Snowboard World Cup season she achieved her second ever WC podium finishing third in Telluride, Colorado. Kimiko competed for Canada at the 2010 Winter Olympics in Vancouver, British Columbia.
