= Jimmy Beans Wool =

American yarn retailer

Jimmy Beans Wool is an American yarn retailer. The company is headquartered in South Meadows, a neighborhood in Reno, Nevada. Other physical locations include a yarn-dyeing facility in Fort Worth, Texas, a sewing team in Vietnam, and a manufacturing facility in India. Jimmy Beans Wool ships to over 60 countries.

== History ==
Laura and Doug Zander founded Jimmy Beans Wool in 2002. Laura Zander became CEO of the company. The original store in Truckee, California, located in a historic train depot, sold coffee and yarn. The company no longer sells coffee. From 2004 to 2007, the company's annual revenue remained steady at $1.2 million. By 2010, sales had reached $4 million. Beginning in 2010, Jimmy Beans Wool created Beans for Brains, an annual scholarship for students who complete an original knit or crochet design. The scholarship is made possible through donations from Vogue Knitting Magazine, Red Heart Yarns, Universal Yarns, Lorna's Laces, and Knitter's Pride Needles.

In 2012, the company partnered with Red Heart Yarns to sponsor seven-time X Games champion and Olympic silver medalist Lindsey Jacobellis. Jacobellis' charity, "Hats 4 Hounds" produces hats for charity using only Red Heart yarn through Jimmy Beans Wool. In 2012, “Knit Red: Stitching for Women's Heart Health” was published and included all red project designs. In 2013, "Sew Red: Sewing & Quilting for Women's Heart Health" was published.

The company was featured on the Inc. 5000 list from 2009 to 2014. Jimmy Beans Wool made $7 million in revenue in 2013 and $8 million in revenue in 2014.

In 2019, the company acquired Madelinetosh, a hand-dyed yarn producer.

In 2025, the company was acquired by Local Crafts Group.
