= Crispin Lipscomb =

Canadian snowboarder (born 1979)

Crispin Lipscomb (born August 7, 1979 in Edmonton, Alberta) is a Canadian snowboarder, specializing in the halfpipe event.

Lipscomb made his World Cup debut in December 2002 at Whistler, and made his first podium later that season, with a bronze at Serre Chevalier. His first World Cup victory came in 2006, at Furano.

Lipscomb has claimed 5 World Cup medals over his career, including two victories, and his best season came in 2005, when he placed 5th overall in the halfpipe standings. He has competed at three FIS Snowboarding World Championships, with his best finish a 6th in 2007.

Lipscomb competed at the 2006 Winter Olympics, in the halfpipe. He was the only Canadian halfpipe snowboarder to advance to a final, after finishing 6th in the second qualifying round. His best run in the final scored 33.5 points, enough for 11th place.

In January 2010, Lipscomb announced his intention to move on from competing at the World Cup level, citing the death of a close friend as changing his outlook on the sport.

== World Cup podiums ==
Date	Location	Rank
March 8, 2003	Serre Chevalier	3rd place, bronze medalist(s)
February 26, 2005	Sungwoo Resort	2nd place, silver medalist(s)
March 18, 2006	Furano	1st place, gold medalist(s)
March 16, 2008	Valmalenco	1st place, gold medalist(s)
September 7, 2008	Cardrona	3rd place, bronze medalist(s)
