= FIS Snowboarding World Championships 2005 =

International snowboarding competition

The FIS Snowboarding World Championships 2005 took place between January 16 and January 22 in Whistler-Blackcomb, near Vancouver, British Columbia, Canada. The venues would be part of the 2010 Winter Olympics at Cypress Mountain.

== Results ==
=== Men's results ===
==== Snowboard Cross ====
The Snowboard Cross finals took place on January 18.

Medal	Name	Nation	Qualification Time (Seeding)
1st place, gold medalist(s)	Seth Wescott	United States	
2nd place, silver medalist(s)	François Boivin	Canada	
3rd place, bronze medalist(s)	Jayson Hale	United States	

==== Parallel Giant Slalom ====
Parallel Giant Slalom finals took place on January 20.

Medal	Name	Nation	Time
1st place, gold medalist(s)	Jasey Jay Anderson	Canada	
2nd place, silver medalist(s)	Urs Eiselin	Switzerland	
3rd place, bronze medalist(s)	Nicolas Huet	France	

==== Parallel Slalom ====
The Parallel Slalom finals took place on January 19.

Medal	Name	Nation	Time
1st place, gold medalist(s)	Jasey Jay Anderson	Canada	
2nd place, silver medalist(s)	Nicolas Huet	France	
3rd place, bronze medalist(s)	Siegfried Grabner	Austria	

==== Halfpipe ====
The finals took place on January 22.

Medal	Name	Nation	Score
1st place, gold medalist(s)	Antti Autti	Finland	
2nd place, silver medalist(s)	Justin Lamoureux	Canada	
3rd place, bronze medalist(s)	Kim Christiansen	Norway	

==== Big Air ====
Big Air finals took place on January 21.

Medal	Name	Nation	Score
1st place, gold medalist(s)	Antti Autti	Finland	
2nd place, silver medalist(s)	Matevž Petek	Slovenia	
3rd place, bronze medalist(s)	Andreas Jakobsson	Sweden	

=== Women's Events ===
==== Snowboard Cross ====
The Snowboard Cross finals took place on January 18.

Medal	Name	Nation	Qualification Time (Seeding)
1st place, gold medalist(s)	Lindsay Jacobellis	United States	
2nd place, silver medalist(s)	Karine Ruby	France	
3rd place, bronze medalist(s)	Maëlle Ricker	Canada	

==== Parallel Giant Slalom ====
Parallel Giant Slalom finals took place on January 20.

Medal	Name	Nation	Time
1st place, gold medalist(s)	Manuela Riegler	Austria	
2nd place, silver medalist(s)	Svetlana Boldykova	Russia	
3rd place, bronze medalist(s)	Doresia Krings	Austria	

==== Parallel Slalom ====
The Parallel Slalom finals took place on January 19.

Medal	Name	Nation	Time
1st place, gold medalist(s)	Daniela Meuli	Switzerland	
2nd place, silver medalist(s)	Heidi Neururer	Austria	
3rd place, bronze medalist(s)	Doresia Krings	Austria	

==== Halfpipe ====
The finals took place on January 22.

Medal	Name	Nation	Score
1st place, gold medalist(s)	Doriane Vidal	France	
2nd place, silver medalist(s)	Manuela Pesko	Switzerland	
3rd place, bronze medalist(s)	Hannah Teter	United States	

== Medal table ==
Place	Country				Total
1	Canada	2	2	1	5
2	United States	2	0	2	4
3	Finland	2	0	0	2
4	Austria	1	1	3	5
5	France	1	2	1	4
6	Switzerland	1	2	0	3
7	Russia	0	1	0	1
8	Slovenia	0	1	0	1
9	Norway	0	0	1	1
10	Sweden	0	0	1	1
