= Doresia Krings =

Austrian snowboarder

Personal information
- Nationality: Austrian
- Born: April 13, 1977 (age 49)
Medal record
Women's snowboarding
Representing Austria
FIS Snowboarding World Championships
Bronze medal – third place	2005 Whistler	Parallel Giant Slalom
Bronze medal – third place	2005 Whistler	Parallel Slalom
Bronze medal – third place	2007 Arosa	Parallel Slalom

Doresia Krings (born 13 April 1977) is an Austrian snowboarder.

She won bronze medals at the FIS Snowboarding World Championships 2005 in the parallel giant slalom and parallel slalom events. She won a further bronze medal at the FIS Snowboarding World Championships 2007 in the parallel slalom event.

Krings participated in the 2006 and 2010 Winter Olympics.
