= Nathan Johnstone =

Australian snowboarder (born 1990)

Personal information
- Born: 9 February 1990 (age 36) Sydney, New South Wales
- Height: 173 cm (5 ft 8 in) (2014)
- Weight: 65 kg (143 lb) (2014)

Sport
- Country: Australia
- Sport: Snowboard
- Event: Half Pipe Men
Medal record
Representing Australia
FIS Snowboarding World Championships
Gold medal – first place	2011 La Molina	Halfpipe
- Updated on 6 February 2014

Nathan Johnstone (born 9 February 1990) is a snowboarder from Australia. Johnstone won the gold medal at the 2011 FIS Snowboarding World Championships in the halfpipe. He finished ninth in the halfipe at the 2009 FIS Snowboarding World Championships. Nathan started his career at a young age riding in the Perisher Winter Sports Club under coach Ben Alexander, who is still his current coach today.
