= Jeff Batchelor =

Canadian professional snowboarder (born 1988)

Personal information
- Born: April 29, 1988 (age 38) Oakville, Ontario, Canada
- Height: 5 ft 6 in / 170 cm
- Weight: 165 lb / 75 kg
- Website: www.jeffbatchelor.com
Medal record
Men's snowboarding
Representing Canada
FIS Snowboarding World Championships
| Silver medal – second place | 2009 Gangwon | Halfpipe |

Jeffrey Batchelor (born April 29, 1988) is a Canadian professional snowboarder who currently competes in snowboard competitions both nationally and internationally. Batchelor is a member of the Canadian National Halfpipe Team. Jeff trains at his home club in Blue Mountain, Ontario. His major sponsor is Algario Communications, a Toronto-based communications and sales development company.

He attended Appleby College in Oakville, Ontario. In 2006, Jeff was named to the Canadian National Snowboard Team, but is no longer on the team.

Jeff as well as the other members of the Canadian national snowboard team co-starred in a reality TV show called Over the Bolts on MTV.

Batchelor competed in the 2010 Winter Olympics, finishing 32nd with a score of 18.5 out of a possible 50 points.
