= Marc Iselin =

Swiss snowboarder

Personal information
- Nationality: Swiss
- Born: April 29, 1980 (age 44)

Sport
- Sport: Snowboarding

Marc Iselin (born 29 April 1980 in Schlieren) is a Swiss snowboarder. He placed 19th in the men's parallel giant slalom event at the 2010 Winter Olympics.
