= Andrew Burton (snowboarder) =

Australian snowboarder (born 1974)

Andrew Burton (born 28 October 1974 in Waratah, Tasmania) is an Australian half-pipe snowboarder. He competed in the 2006 Winter Olympics and placed 34th and 26th in his qualification runs. He ranked 32nd out of 44 competitors and did not make the final.
