= Sudenfeld =

Coordinates: 52°11′N 7°56′E

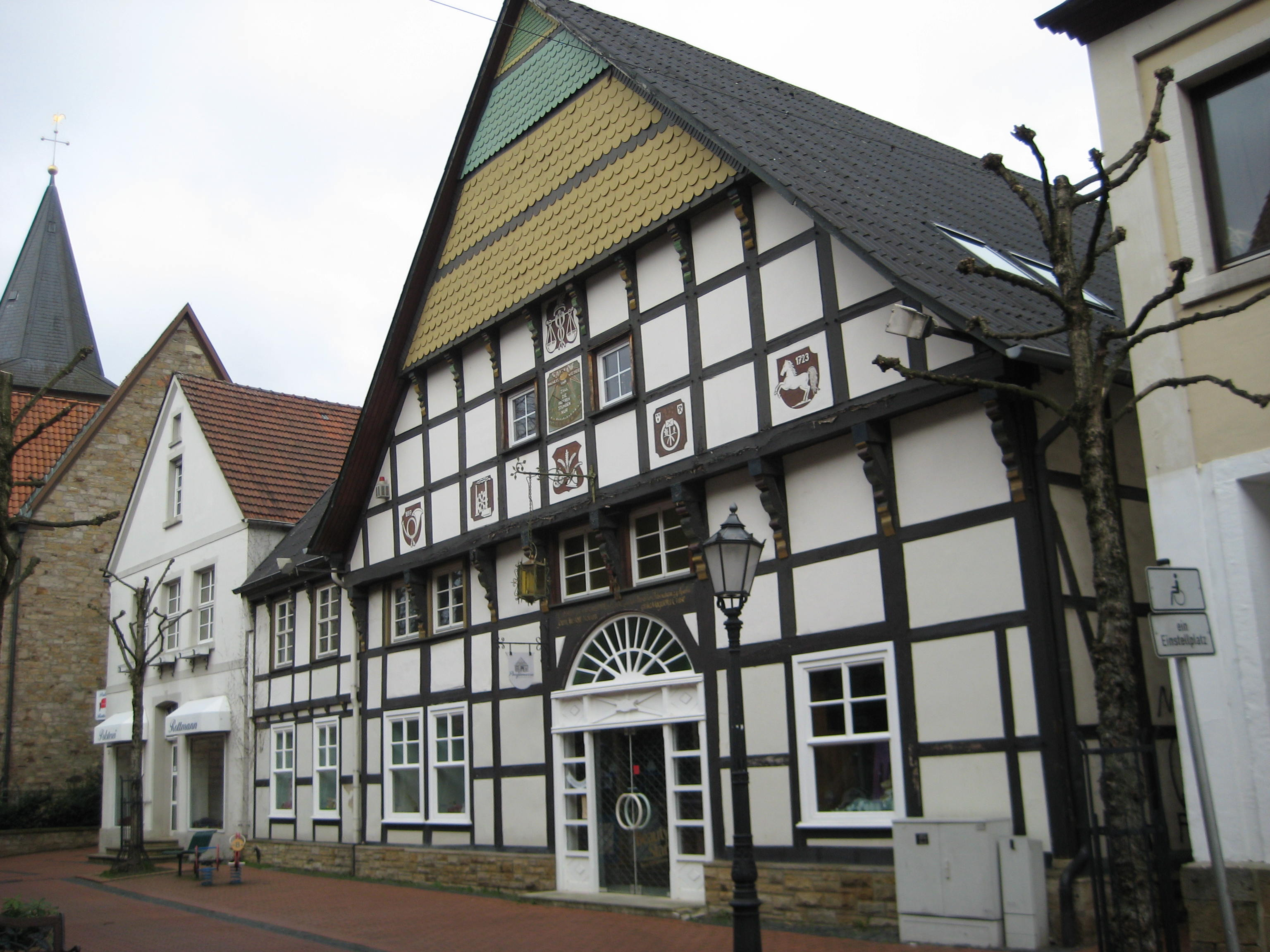
Timber framed house

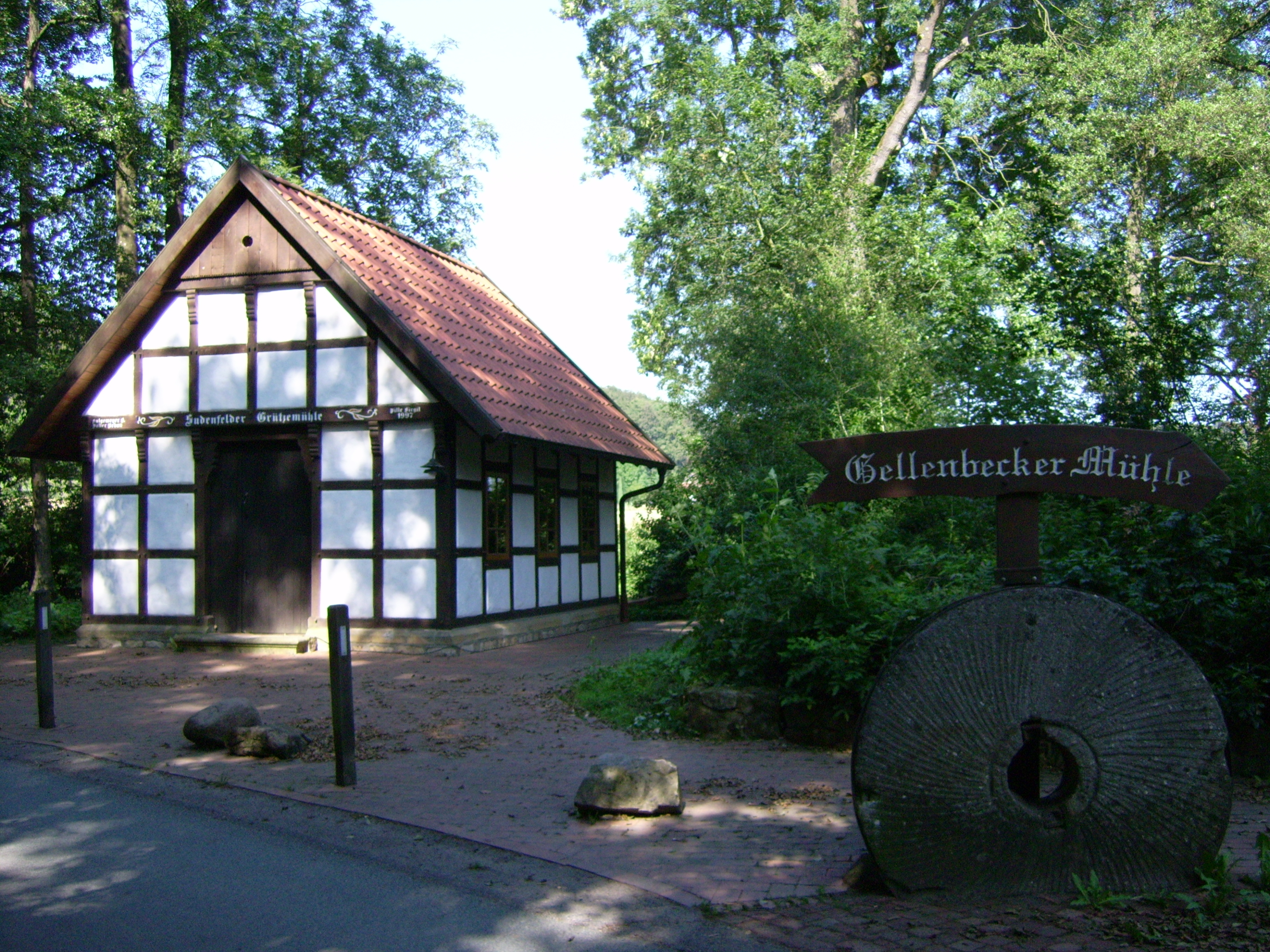
Old mill for groats

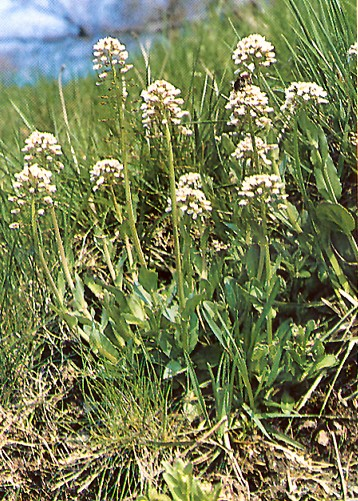
Thlaspi calaminare

Sudenfeld is a small village in Germany. It is located south of Osnabrück.
