= FIS Snowboarding World Championships 2007 =

International snowboarding competition

The FIS Snowboarding World Championships 2007 took place between January 14th and January 20th in Arosa, Switzerland.

== Results ==
=== Men's Results ===
==== Snowboard Cross ====
The Snowboard Cross finals took place on January 14.

Medal	Name	Nation	Qualification Time (Seeding)
1st place, gold medalist(s)	Xavier de Le Rue	France	
2nd place, silver medalist(s)	Seth Wescott	United States	
3rd place, bronze medalist(s)	Nate Holland	United States	

==== Parallel Giant Slalom ====
Parallel Giant Slalom finals took place on January 20.

Medal	Name	Nation	Time
1st place, gold medalist(s)	Rok Flander	Slovenia	
2nd place, silver medalist(s)	Philipp Schoch	Switzerland	
3rd place, bronze medalist(s)	Heinz Inniger	Switzerland	

==== Parallel Slalom ====
The Parallel Slalom finals took place on January 19.

Medal	Name	Nation	Time
1st place, gold medalist(s)	Simon Schoch	Switzerland	
2nd place, silver medalist(s)	Philipp Schoch	Switzerland	
3rd place, bronze medalist(s)	Rok Flander	Slovenia	

==== Halfpipe ====
The finals took place on January 20.

Medal	Name	Nation	Score
1st place, gold medalist(s)	Mathieu Crepel	France	
2nd place, silver medalist(s)	Kazuhiro Kokubo	Japan	
3rd place, bronze medalist(s)	Brad Martin	Canada	

==== Big Air ====
Big Air finals took place on January 19.

Medal	Name	Nation	Score
1st place, gold medalist(s)	Mathieu Crepel	France	
2nd place, silver medalist(s)	Antti Autti	Finland	
3rd place, bronze medalist(s)	Janne Korpi	Finland	

=== Women's Events ===
==== Snowboard Cross ====
The Snowboard Cross finals took place on January 14.

Medal	Name	Nation	Qualification Time (Seeding)
1st place, gold medalist(s)	Lindsey Jacobellis	United States	
2nd place, silver medalist(s)	Sandra Frei	Switzerland	
3rd place, bronze medalist(s)	Helene Olafsen	Norway	

==== Parallel Giant Slalom ====
Parallel Giant Slalom finals took place on January 20.

Medal	Name	Nation	Time
1st place, gold medalist(s)	Ekaterina Tudigescheva	Russia	
2nd place, silver medalist(s)	Amelie Kober	Germany	
3rd place, bronze medalist(s)	Fraenzi Kohli	Switzerland	

==== Parallel Slalom ====
The Parallel Slalom finals took place on January 19.

Medal	Name	Nation	Time
1st place, gold medalist(s)	Heidi Neururer	Austria	
2nd place, silver medalist(s)	Marion Kreiner	Austria	
3rd place, bronze medalist(s)	Doresia Krings	Austria	

==== Halfpipe ====
The finals took place on January 20.

Medal	Name	Nation	Score
1st place, gold medalist(s)	Manuela Pesko	Switzerland	
2nd place, silver medalist(s)	Soko Yamaoka	Japan	
3rd place, bronze medalist(s)	Paulina Ligocka	Poland	

== Medal table ==
Place	Country				Total
1	France	3	0	0	3
2	Switzerland	2	3	2	7
3	United States	1	1	1	3
4	Slovenia	1	0	1	2
5	Russia	1	0	0	1
6	Japan	0	2	0	2
7	Finland	0	1	1	2
8	Germany	0	1	0	1
9	Canada	0	0	1	1
9	Poland	0	0	1	1
