= Heinz Inniger =

Swiss snowboarder (born 1980)

Medal record

Men's snowboarding

Representing Switzerland

FIS Snowboarding World Championships
Bronze medal – third place	2007 Arosa	Parallel Giant Slalom

Heinz Inniger (born 18 December 1980) is a Swiss snowboarder. He ranked 4th in Parallel Slalom at the World Cup 2004/2005.
