= Philipp Schoch =

Swiss snowboarder

Personal information
- Born: 12 October 1979 (age 46) Winterthur, Zürich, Switzerland
- Height: 1.82 m (6 ft 0 in)
- Weight: 95 kg (209 lb)

Sport
- Sport: Snowboarding
- Club: Skiclub Fischenthal
Medal record
Representing Switzerland
Olympic Games
Gold medal – first place	2002 Salt Lake City	Parallel Giant Slalom
Gold medal – first place	2006 Turin	Parallel Giant Slalom
FIS Snowboarding World Championships
Silver medal – second place	2007 Arosa	Parallel Giant Slalom
Silver medal – second place	2007 Arosa	Parallel Slalom

Philipp Schoch (born 10 October 1979) is a Swiss snowboarder. He won a gold medal in the Parallel Giant Slalom at the 2002 Winter Olympics. At the next Olympics, he faced his brother Simon Schoch in the Parallel Giant Slalom Final. Philipp raced away to an unassailable 0.88 second lead in the first leg of the final, retaining his Olympic crown. He is the first snowboarder to win two gold medals in the Winter Olympics. At the world championships, he won two silver medals in the slalom events in 2007.
