= Aleksandra Zhekova =

Bulgaria snowboarder

Alexandra Jekova
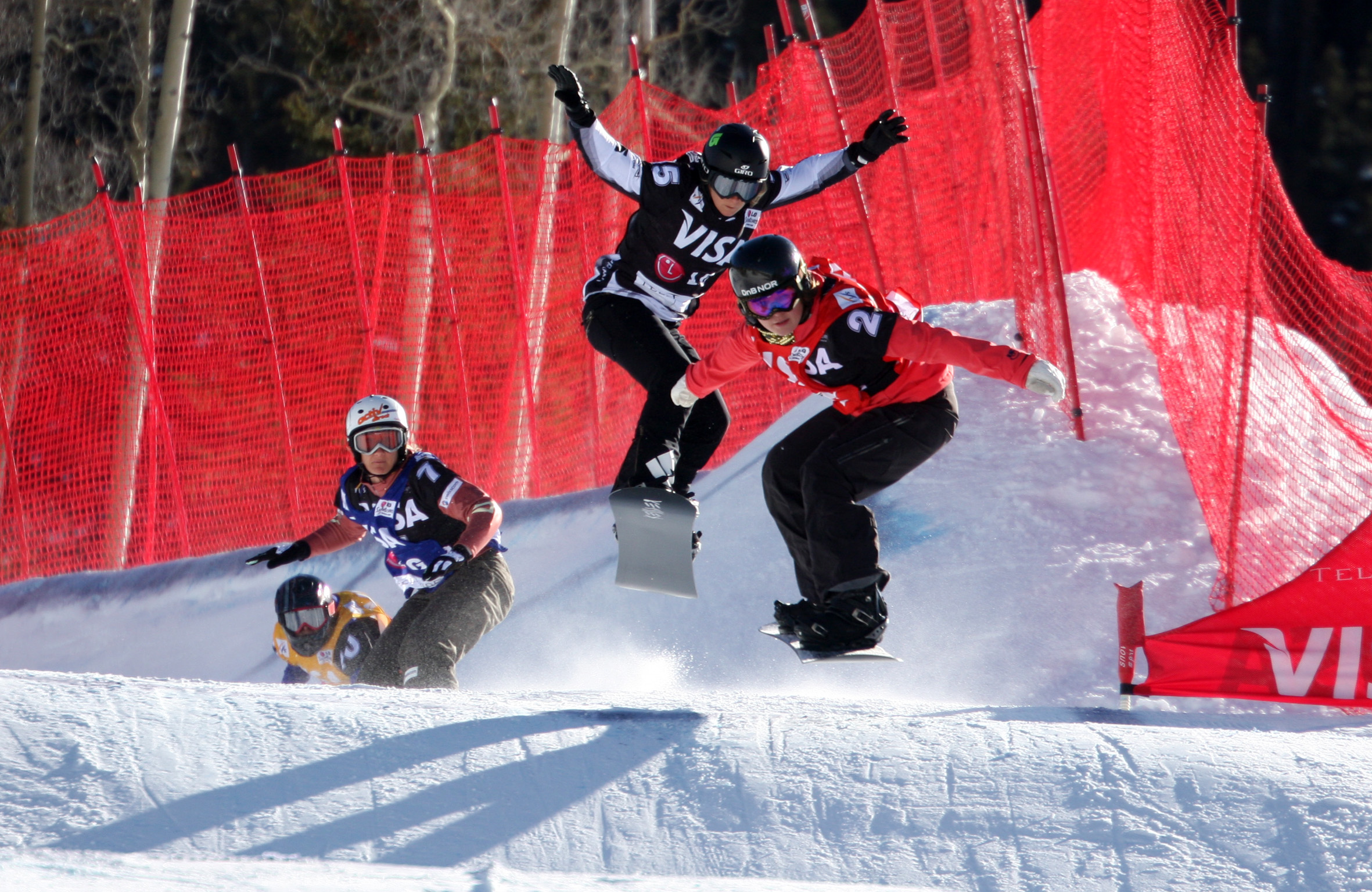
- Helene Olafsen (leading), Alexandra Jekova, Tanja Frieden, Nelly Moenne Loccoz. Telluride, 19.12.2009, Quarter Final

Personal information
- Born: 5 October 1987 (age 38) Sofia, Bulgaria
- Height: 1.67 m (5 ft 6 in)
- Weight: 60 kg (132 lb)

Sport
- Country: Bulgaria
Medal record
Women's snowboarding
Representing Bulgaria
Winter X Games
Silver medal – second place	2012 Aspen	Snowboard X
Winter Universiade
Gold medal – first place	2015 Granada	Snowboard cross

Alexandra Jekova (Bulgarian: Александра Жекова) (born October 5, 1987) is a snowboarder from Bulgaria. She competed for Bulgaria at the 2010 Winter Olympics in snowboard cross and parallel giant slalom. Jekova was Bulgaria's flag bearer during the 2010 Winter Olympics opening ceremony. She finished 5th in the 2014 Olympics cross event and 6th at the 2018 Olympics.

At Winter X Games XVI, Jekova became the first Bulgarian to win a medal at the X Games, capturing silver in Snowboard X.

== World Cup ==
=== Snowboard Cross Podiums ===
Season	Date	Location	Place
2005–2006	14 Jan 2006	Kronplatz, Italy	3rd
2006–2007	11 Mar 2007	Lake Placid, United States	2nd
2007–2008	13 Mar 2008	Valmalenco, Italy	2nd
2009–2010	12 Sep 2009	Chapelco, Argentina	2nd
2010–2011	8 Dec 2010	Lech am Arlberg, Austria	3rd
2010–2011	17 Dec 2010	Telluride, United States	2nd
2010–2011	24 Mar 2011	Arosa, Switzerland	1st
2010–2011	25 Mar 2011	Arosa, Switzerland	1st
2011–2012	19 Jan 2012	Veysonnaz, Switzerland	2nd
2011–2012	22 Jan 2012	Veysonnaz, Switzerland	3rd
2011–2012	8 Feb 2012	Blue Mountain, Canada	2nd
2011–2012	14 Mar 2012	Valmalenco, Italy	2nd
2012–2013	14 Dec 2012	Telluride, United States	3rd
2013–2014	11 Jan 2014	Vallnord, Andorra	2nd
2013–2014	11 Mar 2014	Veysonnaz, Switzerland	3rd
2015–2016	5 Mar 2016	Veysonnaz, Switzerland	1st

=== Parallel Giant Slalom Podium ===
Season	Date	Location	Place
2006–2007	16 Feb 2007	Furano, Japan	3rd

Olympic Games
Preceded by Ekaterina Dafovska	Flagbearer for Bulgaria; Vancouver 2010	Succeeded by Maria Kirkova
