= Isabella Dal Balcon =

Italian snowboarder (born 1977)

Isabella Dal Balcon (born 11 September 1977) is an Italian professional snowboarder based in Turin. Dal Balcon has to date competed in two Winter Olympic Games in 2002 and 2006 but has failed to achieve a medal in either games. She has also competed in several world cups with more success achieving two podium positions including two first placings in 2006 and 2007.
