= Alberto Schiavon =

Italian snowboarder

Personal information
- Nationality: Italian
- Born: April 2, 1978 (age 46)

Sport
- Sport: Snowboarding

Alberto Schiavon (born 2 April 1978 in Rovereto) is an Italian snowboarder. He competed in the men's snowboard cross event at the 2006 Winter Olympics, placing 26th, and the 2010 Winter Olympics, placing 21st.
