= Markus Keller (snowboarder) =

Swiss snowboarder

Personal information
- Nationality: Swiss
- Born: December 6, 1982 (age 42)

Sport
- Sport: Snowboarding

Markus Keller (born 6 December 1982 in Bottighofen) is a Swiss snowboarder. He competed in the men's halfpipe event at the 2006 Winter Olympics, placing seventh, and the 2010 Winter Olympics, placing 29th.

Keller appeared in a short film for Red Bull TV, titled 'CHAMäLEON'.
