= Sales development =

Marketing and sales Organizations

Sales development is an organization that sits between the marketing and sales functions of a business and is in charge of the front-end of the sales cycle and top of funnel leads by (Note: Hugh Dubberly and Shelley Evenson refer to the "sales cycle" as the series of steps which leads to a sale, or alternatively the period of time necessary for a sale process to be completed.) identifying, connecting with, and qualifying leads. Simply put, this organization is tasked with setting up qualified meetings between a salesperson and a potential buyer with a high probability of purchasing a product or service. A lead that meets this criterion is called a sales qualified lead (SQL). Once a lead is determined to be qualified, it is then passed to a salesperson, typically an account executive, who takes ownership of the lead and conducts the rest of the sales process.

== History ==
The concept of sales development can be traced back as far as the early 1980s, with roots at Oracle. The original Oracle Direct team (DMD), started by Anneke Seley in the early 1980s, is among the earliest sales development teams on record. Throughout the 1980s and 1990s, it has been one of the key organizational strategies for most famous B2B technology companies, including Sun Microsystems, and Cisco. In the late 1990s the sales development role was developed within Computer Associates as a bridge between sales and marketing groups with an emphasis on direct/indirect channel partner support.

== Process ==
=== Types of leads ===
Sales development handles two types of leads. The first, often referred to as an inbound lead, is generated by marketing and sent to a sales development representative (SDR). The SDR will then engage that lead, qualify their interest in purchasing a product and determine whether it is worth spending further resources selling to this lead. If an SDR determines a lead is worth spending sales resources on, the lead is handed off to a salesperson to conduct the rest of the sales process. The second type of lead, often referred to as an outbound prospect, is a lead an SDR discovers by identifying potential buyers that would benefit from the product the SDR is selling. The universe of potential buyers a business can sell to is called a total addressable market (TAM). The criteria for a customer that a business has defined as an ideal fit is often described in an ideal customer profile (ICP), which an SDR will use to identify outbound prospects.

=== SDR outreach ===
Once an SDR has identified the leads, whether inbound or outbound, that they wish to engage in a sales discussion, they must find a way to connect with that lead. Traditionally, this is done through phone-based outreach, which remains the primary channel by which most teams attempt to connect to leads. The email has become the other essential channel by which an SDR attempts to connect with a lead. In recent years, social media has become more prevalent, as an increasing number of teams use LinkedIn, Twitter, and other social media platforms to connect with buyers. Most SDRs teams combine phone, email, and social media outreach in a multi-channel touch pattern to improve the probability that they will connect with their buyers. Outreach to a specific lead is often guided by a touch pattern, which is a cadence of touchpoints at specific intervals over a defined period of time before an SDR ceases outreach and moves on to another lead.

The typical output of SDR's work is a qualified meeting or appointment setting, scheduled for an inside sales team member, usually an account executive. The most common quota element for SDR's is the held meeting, which bonus payments are set to as part of on-target earnings (OTE) compensation plans for SDR's. According to a Gartner study, technical buyers are 87% less likely to answer an SDR/AE compared to an approach that comes from a technical peer, expert, executives, or people from their network.

=== Connecting with the buyer ===
Successful SDR outreach results in connecting with a lead. Connections can occur in any of the channels the SDR is using for outreach: phone, email, or social media. If over a channel other than the phone, an SDR will schedule a phone call, in which the SDR will qualify the lead and interest them in moving forward in the sales process with a salesperson. Qualification criteria are most often described in a sales qualified lead (SQL) definition, which outlines the minimum information an SDR must gather before advancing a lead to the next step in the sales process with a salesperson. Most commonly, the criteria include information on available funds the lead has for a product (budget), the lead's ability to make a decision on purchasing a product (authority), how the lead need and the company will benefit from purchasing the product (need), and when the lead will be able to make a decision to buy (timeline).

Once an SDR gathers enough information to meet the criteria in the SQL definition, and the lead agrees to take the next step in the sales process, an SDR will schedule the next meeting between the lead and a salesperson and hand ownership off to that salesperson, who then conducts the rest of the sales process.
