= Sandra Frei =

Swiss snowboarder

Personal information
- Born: 6 August 1984 (age 41) Flims, Graubünden, Switzerland
- Height: 174 cm (5 ft 9 in)
- Weight: 70 kg (154 lb)
Medal record
Women's snowboarding
Representing Switzerland
World Championships
Silver medal – second place	2007 Arosa	Snowboard cross
Winter X Games
Bronze medal – third place	2008 Aspen	Snowboard cross
Bronze medal – third place	2009 Aspen	Snowboard cross

Sandra Frei (born 6 August 1984) is a snowboarder who represented Switzerland at the 2010 Winter Olympics in the snowboard cross event, where she placed 11th. She also competed at the World Snowboard Championships in 2007 and 2009.

Frei retired in July 2011.
