= Brad Martin (snowboarder) =

Canadian snowboarder (born 1986)

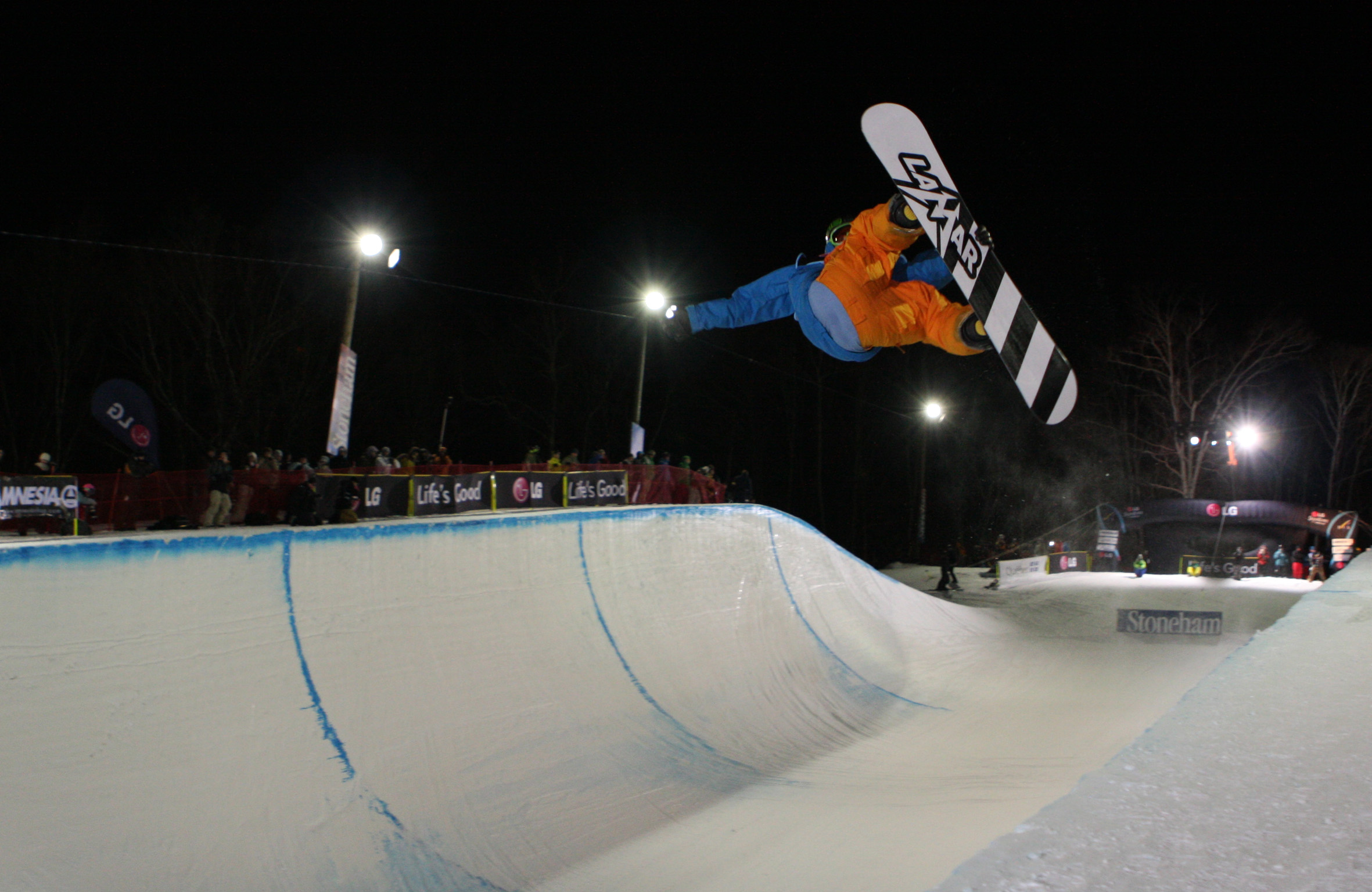

Personal information
- Nationality: Canada
- Born: August 12, 1986 (age 39) Hamilton, Ontario, Canada

Sport
- Sport: Snowboarding
- Event: Half-pipe
- Club: Craigleith Ski Club
Medal record
Men's snowboarding
Representing Canada
World Championships
| Bronze medal – third place | 2007 Arosa | Men's halfpipe |

Brad Martin (born August 12, 1986) is a Canadian snowboarder who specializes in the halfpipe. Martin was born and resides in Hamilton, Ontario, currently in the west Hamilton area of Ancaster.

== Career ==
In 2006, he finished 16th in the halfpipe event at the Olympics. He won a bronze medal at the 2007 FIS Snowboarding World Championships. On February 29, 2008, he won his first world cup event. He has been the Canadian champion in the halfpipe for three straight years, winning in 2007, 2008 and 2009.

On January 25, 2010, he was one of 18 athletes announced to the Olympic snowboard team. He will compete in the halfpipe.
