= Paulina Ligocka =

Polish snowboarder (born 1984)

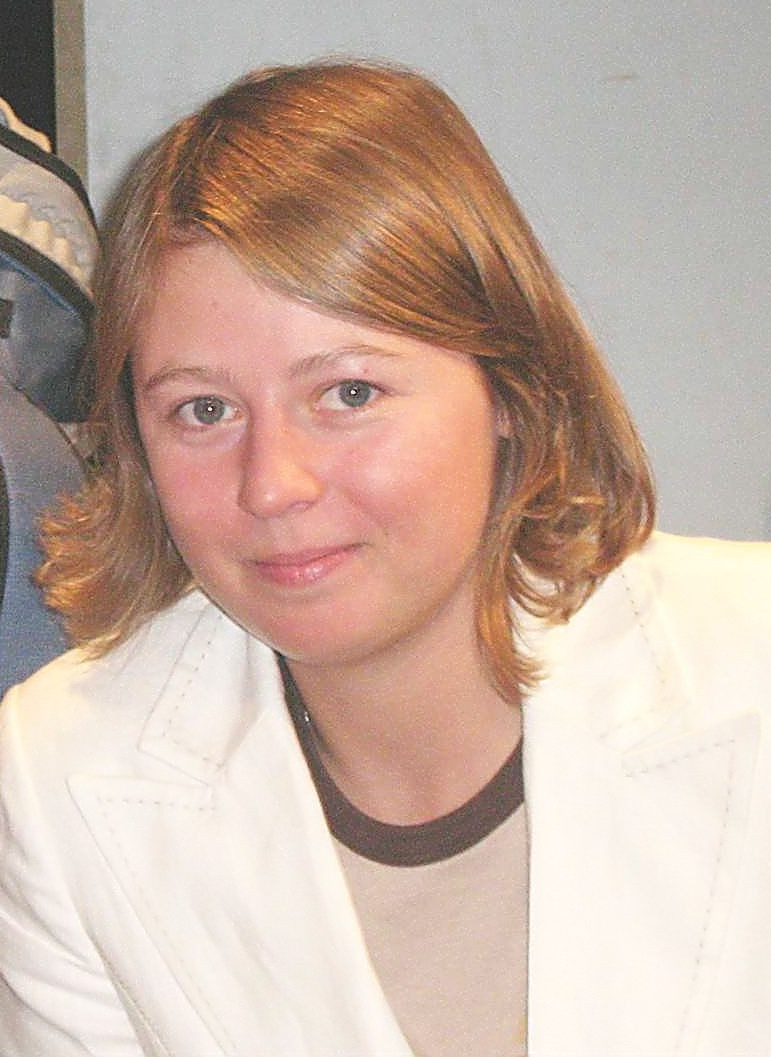

Medal record

Women's snowboarding

Representing Poland

FIS Snowboarding World Championships
Bronze medal – third place	2007 Arosa	Halfpipe
Bronze medal – third place	2009 Gangwon	Halfpipe

Paulina Ligocka (born 25 May 1984) is a Polish snowboarder. In March 2006, she finished second in the cumulative final standing of the World Cup in half-pipe. She was an Olympian at the 2006 Winter Olympics in Turin, where she was the bearer of the Polish flag at the opening ceremonies. She competed in half-pipe, finishing 17th.

Born in Gliwice, she lived in the town of Cieszyn, on the border with the Czech Republic.

Olympic Games
Preceded by Mariusz Siudek	Flagbearer for Poland; Turin 2006	Succeeded by Konrad Niedźwiedzki
