= François Boivin =

Canadian snowboarder (born 1982)

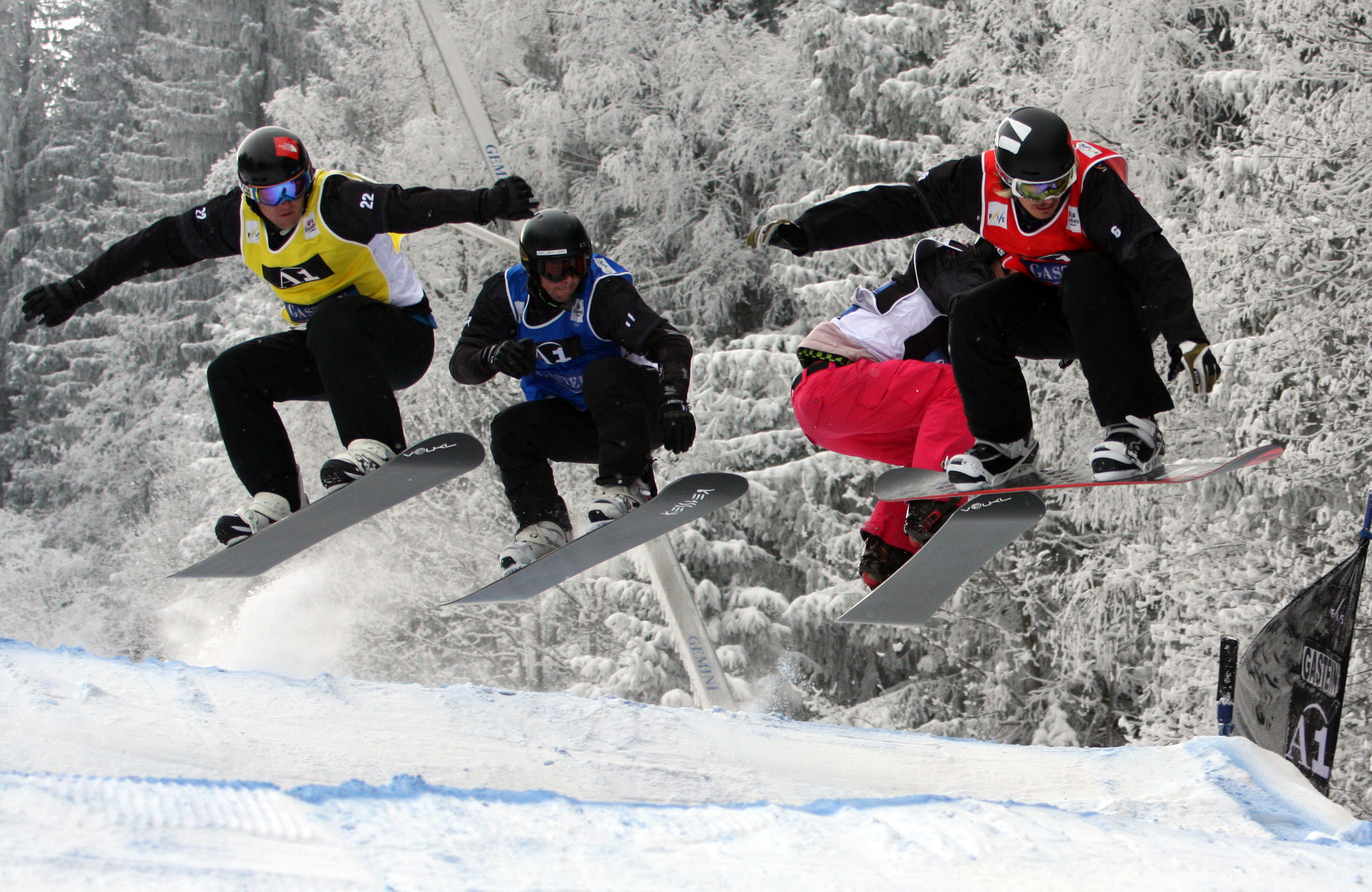
- Bad Gastein SBX, Heat 6 (Men): Alex Pullin (AUS), Koicho Ito (JPN), Francois Boivin (CAN), Damon Hayler (AUS).

Personal information
- Born: 8 December 1982 (age 43) Jonquière, Quebec, Canada
- Height: 170 cm (5 ft 7 in)
- Weight: 70 kg (154 lb)

Sport
- Country: Canada
- Sport: Snowboarding
- Event: Snowboard cross
- Retired: May 2012

Achievements and titles
- World finals: 2005 World Championships: Snowboard cross – Silver
Medal record
Men's Snowboarding
Representing Canada
FIS Snowboard World Championships
Silver medal – second place	2005 Whistler	Snowboard cross
- Updated on 10 February 2015

François Boivin (born 8 December 1982) is a Canadian snowboarder who competed in snowboard cross. He has represented Canada at two Winter Olympic games, won a silver medal at a World Championships, and won three bronze medals in World Cup competitions.

Boivin was born in Jonquière, Quebec. He started snowboarding at the age of eight. He has represented Canada at the 2006 Winter Olympics in Turin where he placed tenth, and at the 2010 Winter Olympics in Vancouver where he placed twelfth. On the World Cup circuit, Boivin won bronze in 2004 at Berchtesgaden, 2005 at Sierra Nevada, and 2009 in La Molina. At the 2005 World Championships, Boivin won a silver medal.

Boivin retired in 2012.
