= Ryō Aono =

Japanese snowboarder (born 1990)

Personal information
- Full name: Ryō Aono
- Born: May 15, 1990 (age 36) Matsuyama, Ehime

Sport
- Country: Japan
- Sport: Snowboarding
Medal record
Men's snowboarding
Representing Japan
World Championships
Gold medal – first place	2009 Gangwon	Halfpipe
Winter X Games
Bronze medal – third place	2012 Aspen	SuperPipe

Ryō Aono or Ryoh Aono (青野 令, Aono Ryō) (born May 15, 1990) is a Japanese snowboarder who has 12 World Cup victories. He competed for Japan at the 2010 Winter Olympics in half-pipe. He received the second best score in the qualifying round and automatically qualified for the finals. However, in the finals he placed 9th overall.

== See also ==
- Snowboarding at the 2010 Winter Olympics
