= Mathieu Crépel =

French snowboarder (born 1984)

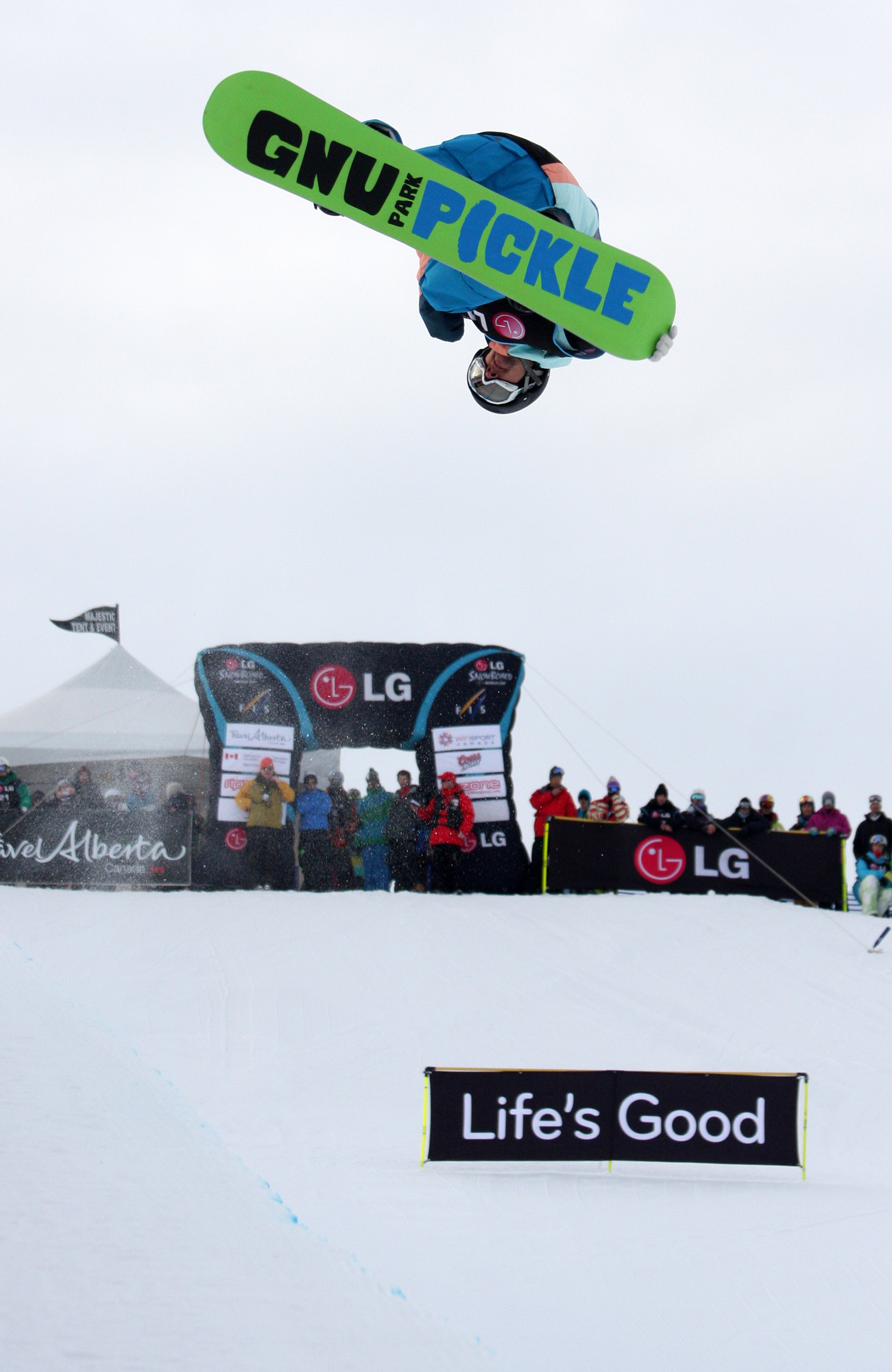
- Crépel in 2010

Medal record

Men's Snowboarding

Representing France

FIS Snowboarding World Championships
Gold medal – first place	2007 Arosa	Halfpipe
Gold medal – first place	2007 Arosa	Big Air
Bronze medal – third place	2009 Gangwon	Halfpipe

Mathieu Crépel (born 26 October 1984 in Tarbes, Hautes-Pyrénées) is a French professional snowboarder and World Champion based in Anglet, Northern Basque Country. Crépel rides regular stance. He has also surfed competitively in the multi-discipline Quik Cup.

== Early life ==
Crépel began snowboarding at the age of six in the Pyrenean resort of La Mongie (Hautes-Pyrénées) on a customised board specially designed for a small child with ski bindings, soon earning the nickname 'Little Monkey' for his agility. His family attended many major winter sports events due to his father's occupation as a ski instructor and consequently Crépel was present at the birth of snowboarding in France and the Pyrenees.

When he was 10 years old, Crépel was spotted by Terje Haakonsen whilst on a Quiksilver photoshoot in Greenland and invited to take part in the Arctic Challenge and by the age of 15 he had been runner up in the Youth World Championships. He went on to win the snowboarding title in the Quik Cup of 2001 and 2002, took third place in the 2001 Half Pipe Junior World Championships and second place in the 2003 Quiksilver Slopestyle Pro in 2003.

== Senior snowboarding career ==
In 2005, Crépel won the Crystal Globe and was the first ever French winner of a half pipe world title.

In 2006, Crépel represented France at the Olympic Winter Games but failed to win a medal however later in the same year he became the first Ticket to Ride (TTR) World Snowboard Tour champion.

In 2007, Mathieu Crépel became world champion at both big air and the half pipe at the World Championships in Arosa, Switzerland. During the big air he became the first ever person to land a switch backside 12 in competition.

== Mathieu Crépel Invitational ==
The Mathieu Crépel Invitational is a new annual event (inaugural meet February 2008) which will be held in the Ayré Forest in the Pyrenees and will form part of the TTR World Championship series. The event is notable for its unique format – each rider nominates two tricks and the set trick list is created by drawing five of the nominations at random.

== Media and business ventures ==
Crépel has appeared in several snowboarding videos and is the subject of a book published in France by Editions Rival.

He also a supporter of the environmental organisations the Mountain Riders association and the Surfrider Foundation

== See also ==
- Snowboarding at the 2006 Winter Olympics – Men's halfpipe
- France at the 2006 Winter Olympics
