= Fränzi Mägert-Kohli =

Swiss snowboarder

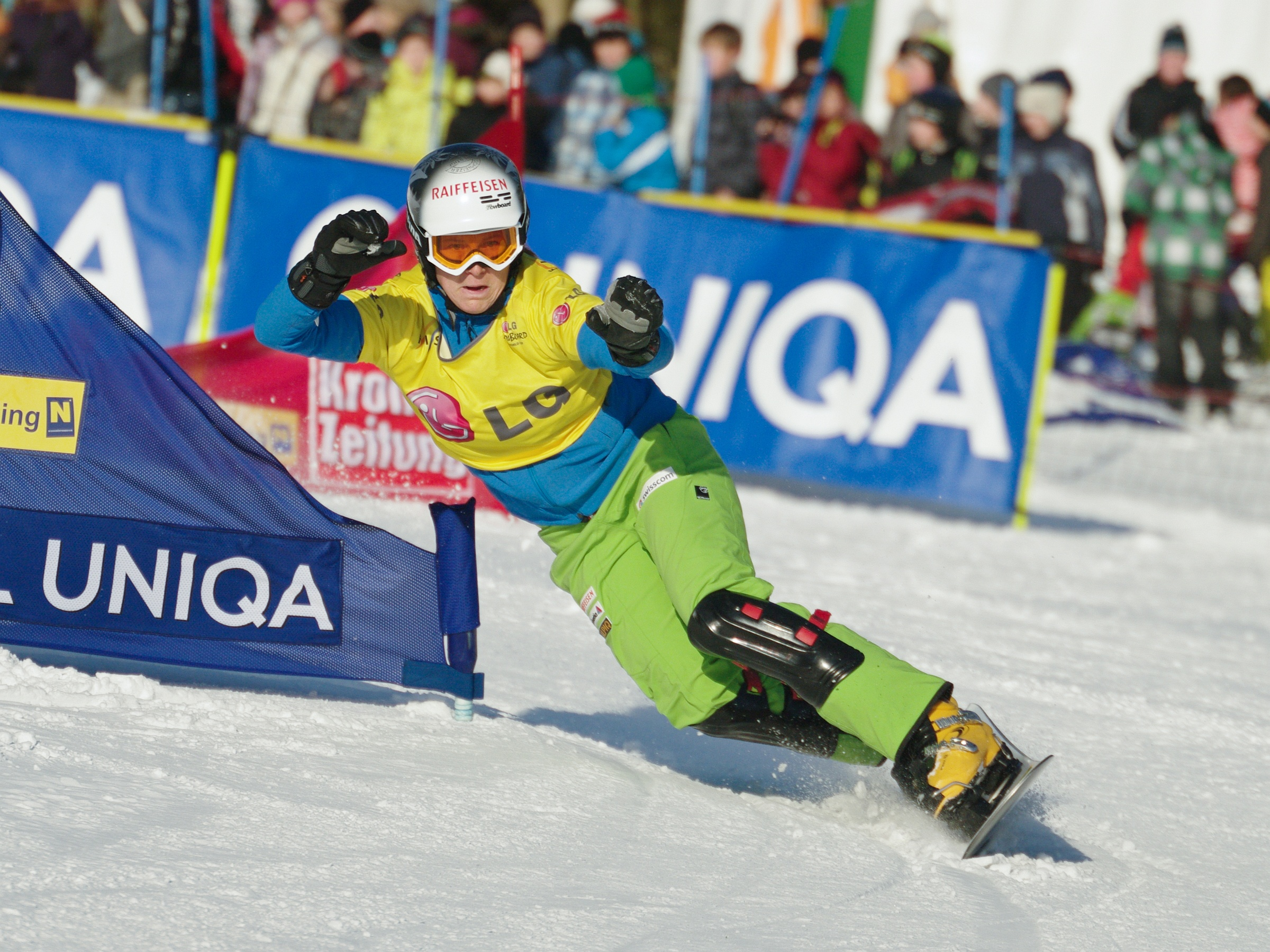
- Mägert-Kohli in 2012

Personal information
- Full name: Franzinska Mägert-Kohli
- Born: 31 May 1982 (age 44) Thun, Switzerland
- Height: 171 cm (5 ft 7 in)
- Weight: 67 kg (148 lb)

Sport
- Country: Switzerland
- Sport: Snowboarding
Medal record
Women's snowboarding
Representing Switzerland
World Championships
Gold medal – first place	2009 Gangwon	Parallel Slalom
Bronze medal – third place	2007 Arosa	Parallel Giant Slalom

Franzinska "Fränzi" Mägert-Kohli (born 31 May 1982) is a Swiss snowboarder. She won the gold medal in the parallel slalom at the 2009 Snowboarding World Championships.
