= Manuela Pesko =

Swiss snowboarder (born 1978)

Medal record

Women's snowboarding

Representing Switzerland

FIS Snowboarding World Championships
Gold medal – first place	2007 Arosa	Halfpipe
Silver medal – second place	2005 Whistler	Halfpipe

Manuela Laura Pesko (born 18 September 1978 in Chur) is a Swiss snowboarder.
