= FIS Snowboarding World Championships 2009 =

2009 edition of the FIS Snowboarding World Championships

- Host city: Gangwon
- Country: South Korea
- Events: 9
- Opening: January 17, 2009
- Closing: January 24, 2009

The FIS Snowboarding World Championships 2009 took place between January 17 and January 24 in Hyundai Sungwoo Resort close to Duwon-ri in Hoengseong County in Gangwon, South Korea.

== Schedule ==
Q	Qualification	F	Final

Event↓/Date →	Sat 17	Sun 18	Mon 19	Tue 20	Wed 21	Thu 22	Fri 23	Sat 24
Snowboard cross	Q	F						
Parallel giant slalom				F				
Parallel slalom					F			
Halfpipe							F	
Big air								F

== Results ==
=== Men's events ===
Event	Gold	Silver	Bronze
Big air	Markku Koski; Finland	Seppe Smits; Belgium	Stefan Gimpl; Austria
Halfpipe	Ryo Aono; Japan	Jeff Batchelor; Canada	Mathieu Crepel; France
Snowboard cross	Markus Schairer; Austria	Xavier de Le Rue; France	Nick Baumgartner; United States
Parallel giant slalom	Jasey Jay Anderson; Canada	Sylvain Dufour; France	Matthew Morison; Canada
Parallel slalom	Benjamin Karl; Austria	Sylvain Dufour; France	Patrick Bussler; Germany

=== Women's events ===
Event	Gold	Silver	Bronze
Halfpipe	Jiayu Liu; China	Holly Crawford; Australia	Paulina Ligocka; Poland
Snowboard cross	Helene Olafsen; Norway	Olivia Nobs; Switzerland	Mellie Francon; Switzerland
Parallel giant slalom	Marion Kreiner; Austria	Doris Günther; Austria	Patrizia Kummer; Switzerland
Parallel slalom	Fränzi Mägert-Kohli; Switzerland	Doris Günther; Austria	Yekaterina Tudegesheva; Russia

== Medal table ==
Place	Country				Total
1	Austria	3	2	1	6
2	Switzerland	1	1	2	4
3	Canada	1	1	1	3
4	China	1	0	0	1
4	Finland	1	0	0	1
4	Japan	1	0	0	1
4	Norway	1	0	0	1
8	France	0	3	1	4
9	Australia	0	1	0	1
9	Belgium	0	1	0	1
11	Germany	0	0	1	1
11	Poland	0	0	1	1
11	Russia	0	0	1	1
11	United States	0	0	1	1
