= Roland Haldi =

Swiss snowboarder

Personal information
- Nationality: Swiss
- Born: January 12, 1979 (age 47)

Sport
- Sport: Snowboarding

Roland Haldi (born 12 January 1979 in Saanen) is a Swiss snowboarder. He placed 20th in the men's parallel giant slalom event at the 2010 Winter Olympics.
