= Heidi Neururer =

Austrian snowboarder (born 1979)

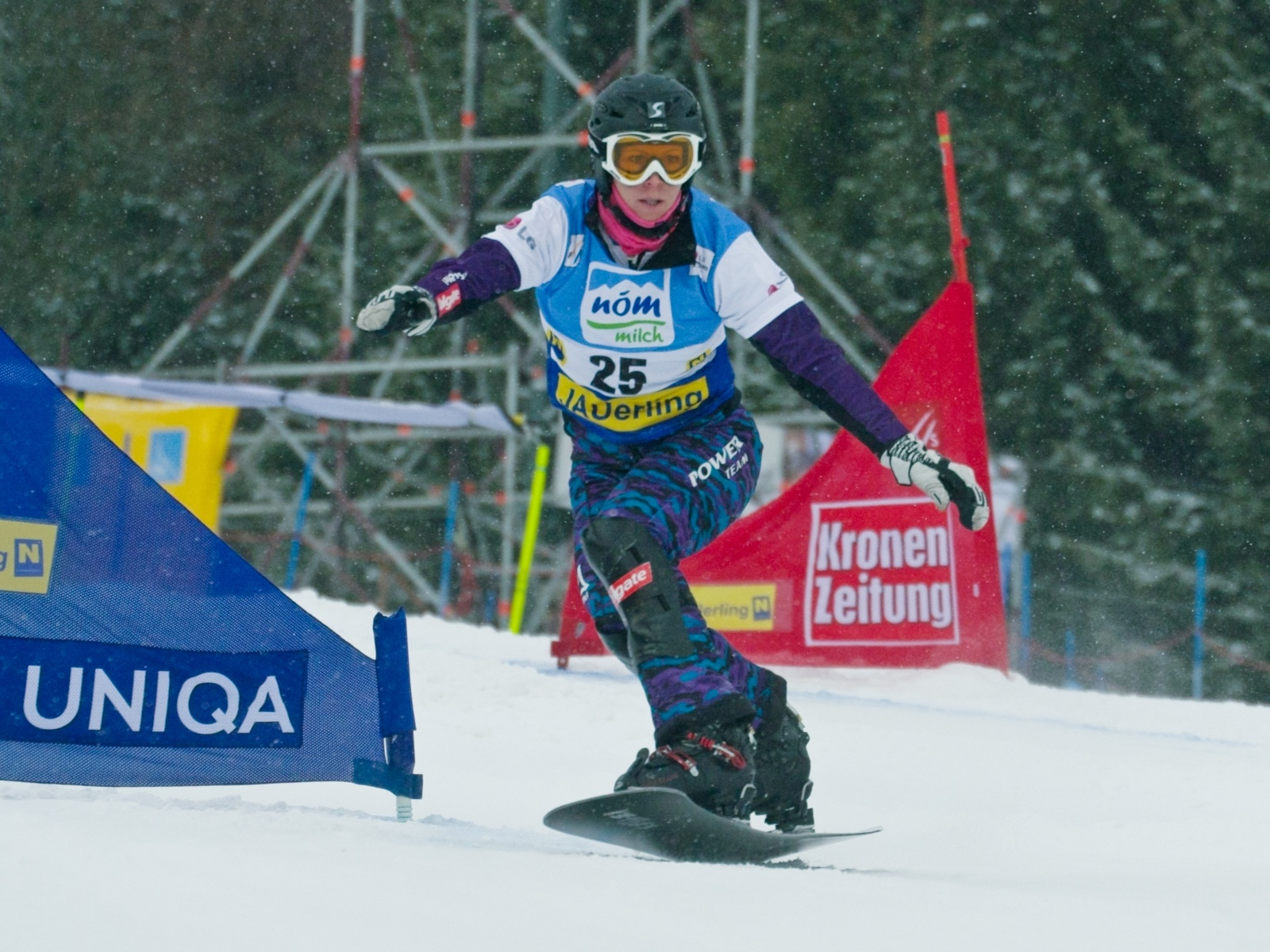
- Neururer in 2012

Medal record

Women's snowboarding

Representing Austria

FIS Snowboarding World Championships
Gold medal – first place	2007 Arosa	Parallel Slalom
Silver medal – second place	2005 Whistler	Parallel Slalom

Heidi Neururer (born 5 January 1979) is a professional snowboarder from Austria. Her speciality is the Parallel (Giant) Slalom.

== Career highlights ==
FIS World Snowboard Championships
2003 – Kreischberg, 15th at parallel giant slalom
2003 – Kreischberg, 19th at parallel slalom
2005 – Whistler, (silver) 2nd at parallel slalom
2007 – Arosa, (gold) 1st at parallel slalom
2007 – Arosa, 27th at parallel giant slalom
World Cup
2001 – Ischgl, (bronze) 3rd at parallel giant slalom
2002 – Whistler, (bronze) 3rd at parallel slalom
2002 – Stoneham, (bronze) 3rd at parallel giant slalom
2003 – Arosa, (bronze) 3rd at parallel giant slalom
2005 – Maribor, (bronze) 3rd at parallel giant slalom
2005 – Sierra Nevada, (silver) 2nd at parallel slalom
2006 – Landgraaf, (bronze) 3rd at parallel slalom
2006 – Bad Gastein (1), (bronze) 3rd at parallel slalom
2006 – Bad Gastein (2), (silver) 2nd at parallel slalom
2007 – Nendaz, (silver) 2nd at parallel slalom
2007 – Bardonecchia, (silver) 2nd at parallel giant slalom
2007 – Shukolovo, (gold) 1st at parallel slalom
2007 – Landgraaf, (silver) 2nd at parallel slalom
2007 – Sölden, (silver) 2nd at parallel giant slalom
2007 – Limone Piemonte, (gold) 1st at parallel giant slalom
2007 – Nendaz, (silver) 2nd at parallel slalom
2007 – La Molina, (gold) 1st at parallel slalom
European Cup
2002 – Kranjska Gora, (bronze) 3rd at parallel giant slalom
National Championships
2003 – Mariapfarr/Fanningsberg, (gold) 1st at parallel giant slalom
2003 – Mariapfarr/Fanningsberg, (bronze) 3rd at parallel slalom
2004 – Bad Gastein, (gold) 1st at parallel giant slalom
2005 – Kreischberg, (bronze) 3rd at parallel giant slalom
2007 – Haus im Ennstal, (bronze) 3rd at parallel slalom
