= Matthew Morison =

Canadian snowboarder (born 1987)

Personal information
- Nickname: Matt
- Born: April 9, 1987 (age 39) Oshawa, Ontario, Canada

Sport
- Sport: Alpine snowboarding
Medal record
Men's snowboarding
Representing Canada
World Championships
Bronze medal – third place	2009 Gangwon	Parallel GS

Matthew Morison (born April 9, 1987) is a Canadian amateur Snowboarder who currently resides in Kamloops, British Columbia. Morison qualified to compete at the 2010 Winter Olympics in Vancouver, British Columbia. Matthew, a native of Burketon, Ontario began snowboarding at the Oshawa Ski Club at a young age. By age 11, Morison was already beating senior men in races. He competes in alpine disciplines, parallel GS and parallel slalom. He attended Courtice Secondary School.

Morison was featured in the MTV Canada series 'Summer Sessions' alongside fellow national riders like Jasey-Jay Anderson and Michael Lambert. He also featured in the follow-up MTV show Over the Bolts which followed the Canadian national team over the season.

Morison finished the 2007–08 season ranked 4th overall in the FIS Snowboard World Cup, in the 2008–09 season he ranked 6th overall. He has reached the podium on nine occasions at World Cup races including three parallel GS golds in Limone Piemonte, Italy, Valmalenco, Italy, and Furano, Japan. He won a bronze at the 2009 FIS World Championships, the bronze was Morison's first world championship medal.
