= Soko Yamaoka =

Japanese snowboarder (born 1974)

Medal record

Women's snowboarding

Representing Japan

World Championships
Silver medal – second place	2007 Arosa	Halfpipe

Asian Games
Silver medal – second place	2007 Changchun	Halfpipe

Soko Yamaoka (山岡聡子, Yamaoka Sōko; born 29 May 1974 in Nagano) is a Japanese snowboarder. She competed in the halfpipe event at the 2006 Winter Olympics, where she placed 10th, and at the 2010 Winter Olympics, where she placed 16th. She also competed at the World Snowboard Championships from 2003 to 2009.
