= Marion Kreiner =

Austrian snowboarder (born 1981)

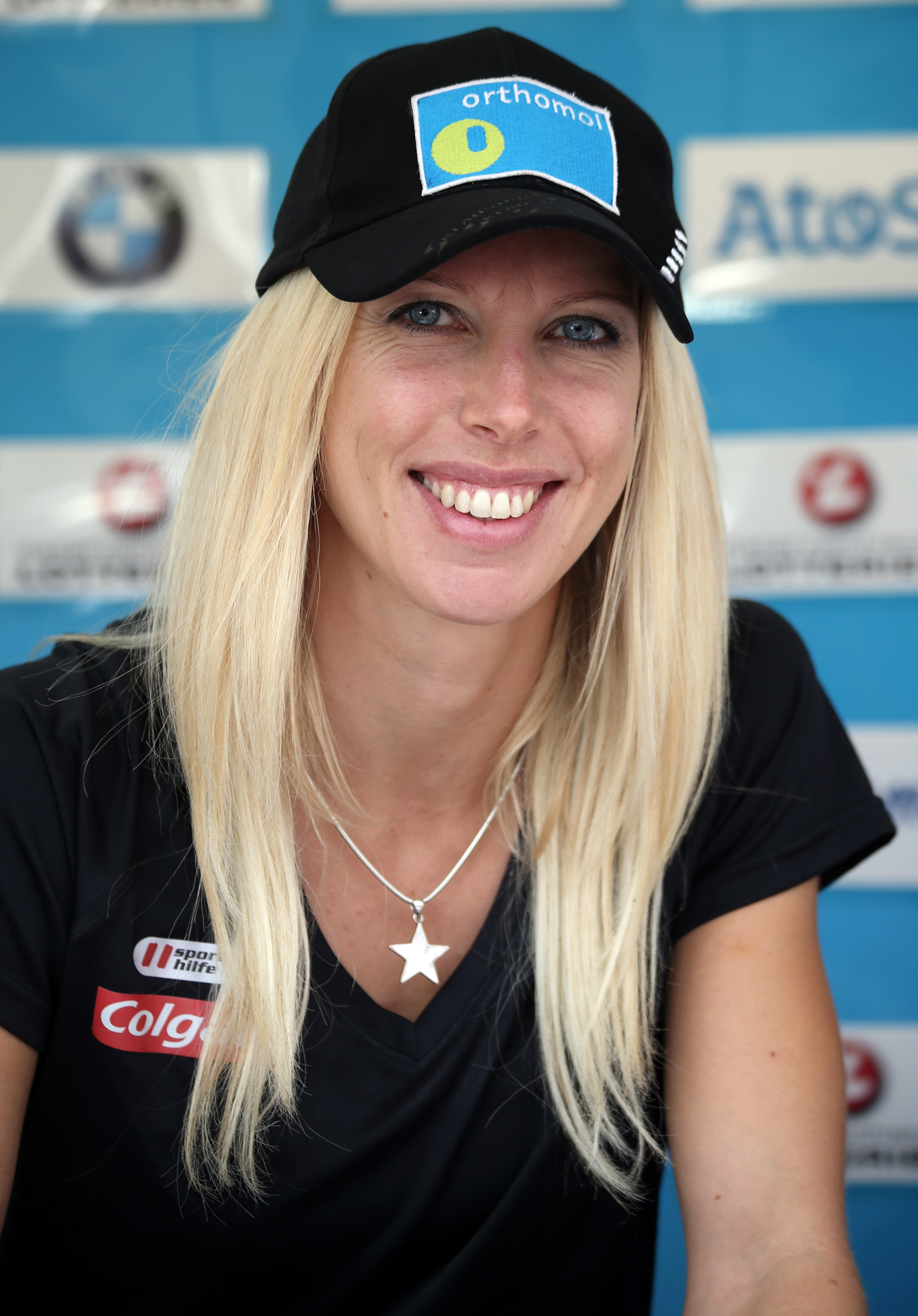

Medal record

Women's snowboarding

Representing Austria

Olympic Games
Bronze medal – third place	2010 Vancouver	Parallel giant slalom

World Championships
Gold medal – first place	2009 Gangwon	Parallel giant slalom
Silver medal – second place	2007 Arosa	Parallel slalom
Bronze medal – third place	2015 Kreischberg	Parallel slalom

Marion Kreiner (born 4 May 1981 in Graz) is an Austrian snowboarder known for Parallel Giant Slalom. She won gold at the FIS Snowboarding World Championships 2009 for Parallel Giant Slalom. She earned a bronze medal at the 2010 Winter Olympics.
