= Isabella Laböck =

German snowboarder

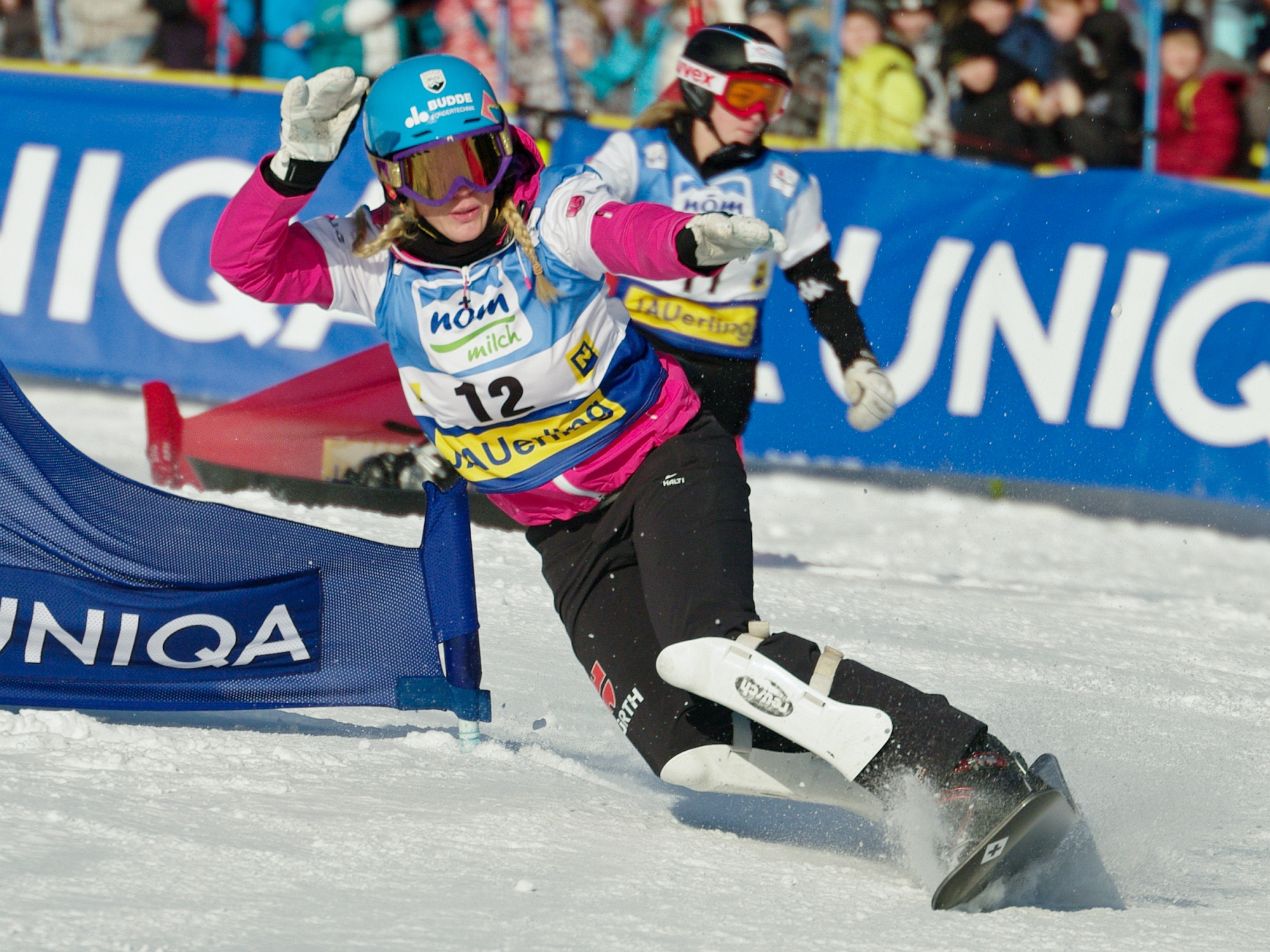

Medal record

Women's snowboarding

Representing Germany

World Championships
Gold medal – first place	2013 Stoneham	Parallel Giant Slalom

Isabella Laböck (also spelled Laboeck, born 6 April 1986 in Prien am Chiemsee) is a German snowboarder.

Laböck won gold in the parallel giant slalom at the 2013 FIS Snowboarding World Championships.
