= Siegfried Grabner =

Austrian snowboarder (born 1975)

Medal record

Men's snowboarding

Representing Austria

Olympic Games
Bronze medal – third place	2006 Turin	Parallel Giant Slalom

FIS Snowboarding World Championships
Gold medal – first place	2003 Kreischberg	Parallel Slalom
Bronze medal – third place	2005 Whistler	Parallel Slalom

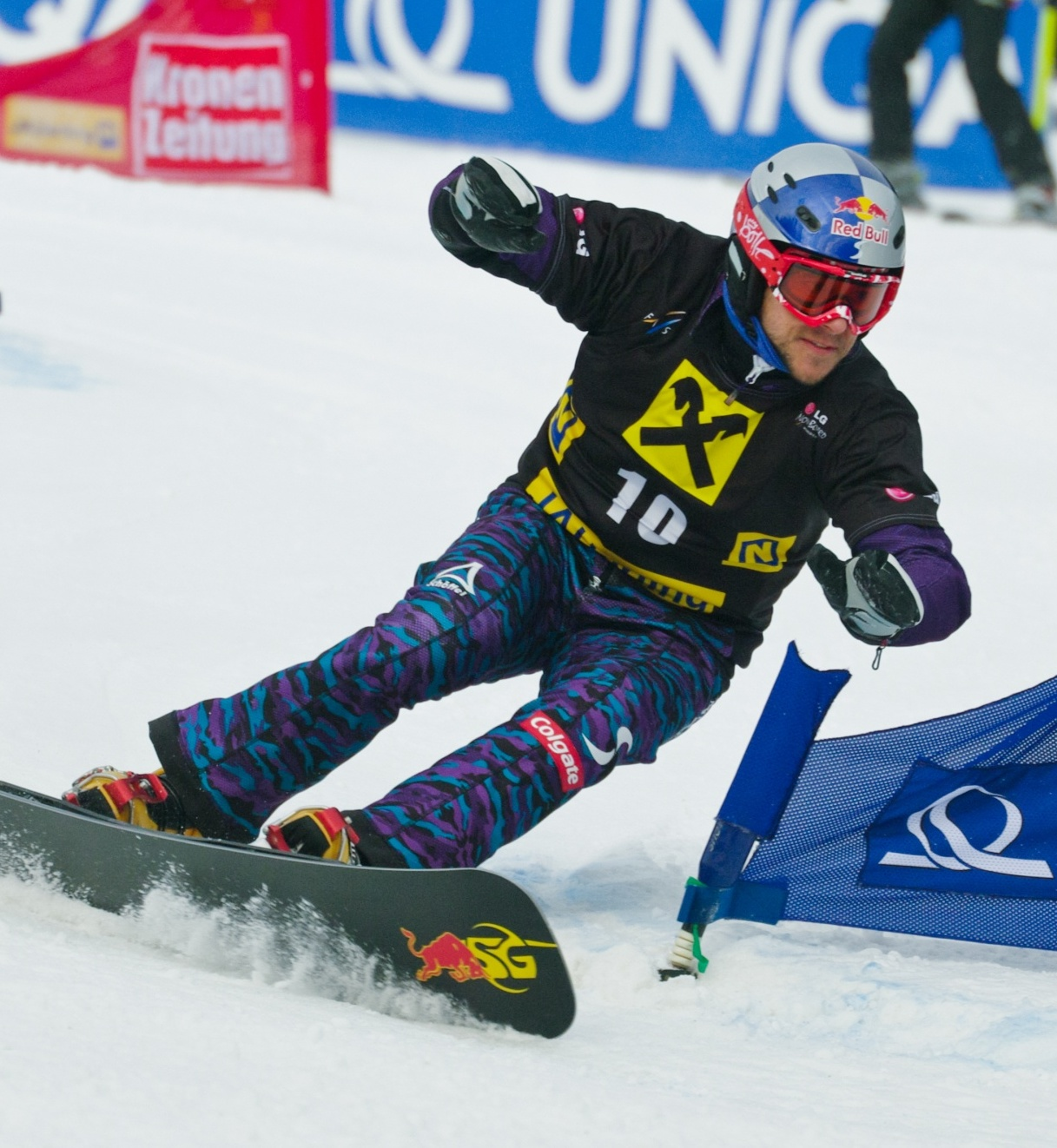
Grabner in 2012.

Siegfried "Sigi" Grabner (born 4 February 1975, in Waiern, Carinthia) is an Austrian professional snowboarder. At the 2006 Winter Olympics in Turin, Italy he won bronze in the Parallel Giant Slalom competition.

Having won the Junior World Championship 1994 in Slovenia, he decided to go professional. He won the European Championship 1995 in Finland, and became part of the Burton Alpine Team. In 2003 he won the Parallel Giant Slalom World Championship in Kreischberg, Austria. In 2005 he ranked third in Whistler, British Columbia.

In the summer of 2003 Siegfried Grabner wrote a book, "Boarder zwischen den Welten" (literally "Boarder between the worlds"). He also develops snowboards, with his "SG Snowboards" available in autumn 2005 in three variants. He won the medal at the Turin Olympics on one of his Torino raceboards.

Grabner resides in La Massana, Andorra.

== World Cup victories ==
Date	Place	Country	Discipline
20 January 2002	Bardonecchia	Italy	Parallel Giant Slalom
24 January 2002	Kreischberg	Austria	Parallel Giant Slalom
19 October 2003	Sölden	Austria	Parallel Slalom
12 December 2003	Whistler Mountain	Canada	Parallel Giant Slalom
3 February 2004	Maribor	Slovenia	Parallel Giant Slalom
14 March 2004	Bardonecchia	Italy	Parallel Giant Slalom
7 January 2005	Saint Petersburg	Russia	Parallel Slalom
18 February 2005	Sapporo	Japan	Parallel Giant Slalom
7 October 2005	Landgraaf	Netherlands	Parallel Slalom
13 October 2006	Landgraaf	Netherlands	Parallel Slalom
20 December 2006	Bad Gastein	Austria	Parallel Slalom
21 December 2008	Arosa	Switzerland	Parallel Slalom
6 January 2009	Kreischberg	Austria	Parallel Giant Slalom
