= 2016–17 FIS Alpine Ski Europa Cup =

Alpine Ski Europa Cup season

Discipline	Men	Women
Overall	(Switzerland) Gilles Roulin	(Norway) Kristina Riis-Johannessen
Downhill	(Switzerland) Gilles Roulin	(Austria) Sabrina Maier
Super-G	(Switzerland) Gilles Roulin	(Austria) Nadine Fest
Giant Slalom	(Switzerland) Elia Zurbriggen	(Norway) Kristin Lysdahl
Slalom	(Switzerland) Reto Schmidiger	(Sweden) Anna Swenn Larsson
Combined	(Switzerland) Stefan Rogentin	(Austria) Nadine Fest

Competition
Locations	17	14
Individual	38	35

2016–17 FIS Alpine Ski Europa Cup was the 46th season of the FIS Alpine Ski Europa Cup.

== Standings ==
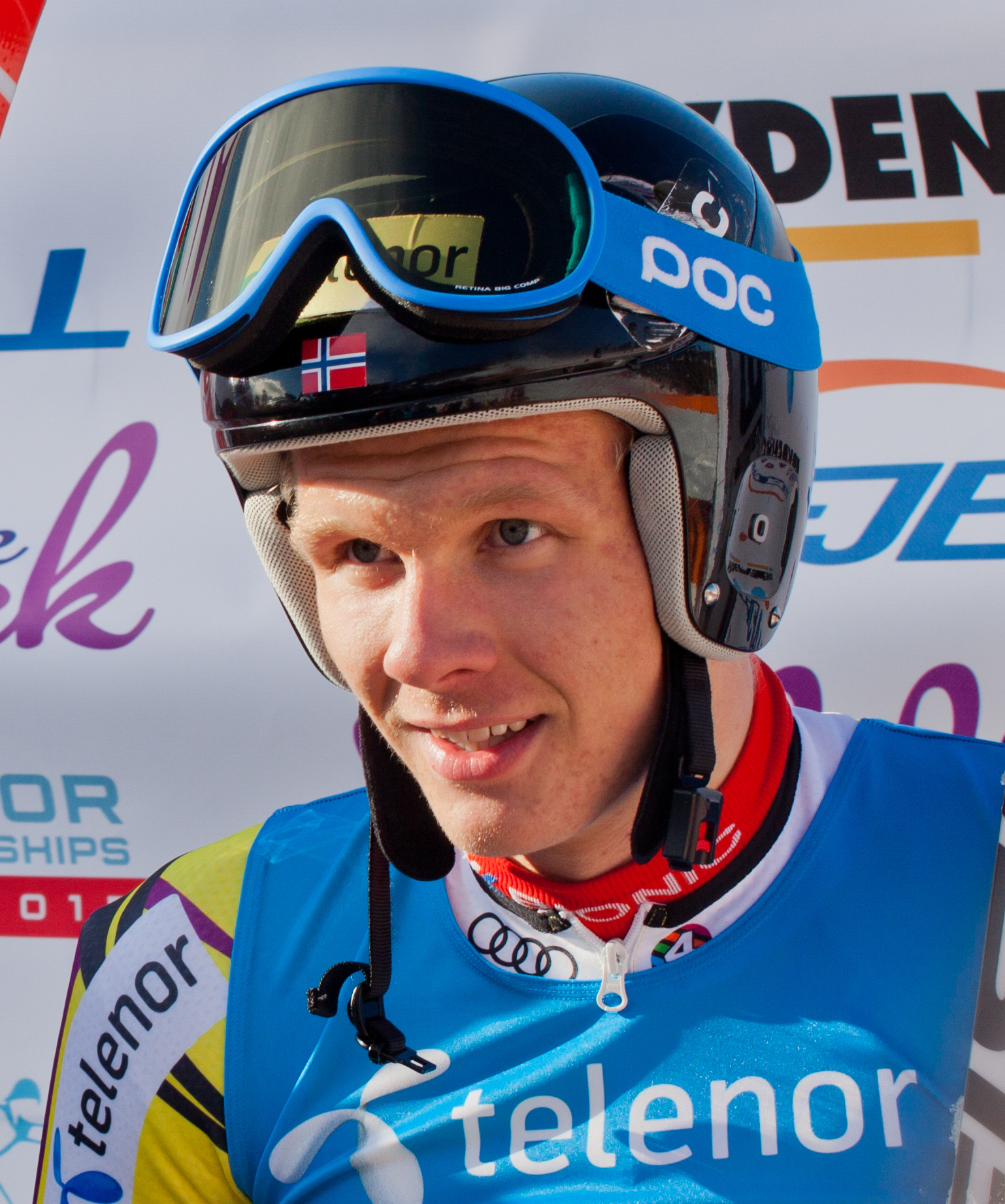
The Norwegian Marcus Monsen, third in men's overall standings.

=== Overall ===
Men

Rank	Skier	Country	Points
1	Gilles Roulin	Switzerland	1060
2	Stefan Rogentin	Switzerland	691
3	Marcus Monsen	Norway	637
4	Gian Luca Barandun	Switzerland	609
5	Christian Hirschbühl	Austria	597
6	Niklas Koeck	Austria	566
7	Johannes Kröll	Austria	561
8	Cyprien Sarrazin	France	560
9	Rasmus Windingstad	Norway	552
10	Elia Zurbriggen	Switzerland	541

Women

Rank	Skier	Country	Points
1	Kristina Riis-Johannessen	Norway	1206
2	Kristin Lysdahl	Norway	1092
3	Nadine Fest	Austria	910
4	Laura Pirovano	Italy	750
5	Sabrina Maier	Austria	650
6	Elisabeth Kappaurer	Austria	624
7	Katharina Gallhuber	Austria	618
8	Jessica Hilzinger	England	594
9	Camille Rast	Switzerland	591
10	Katharina Liensberger	Austria	569

=== Downhill ===
Men

Rank	Skier	Country	Points
1	Gilles Roulin	Switzerland	445
2	Johannes Kröll	Austria	312
3	Manuel Schmid	United Kingdom	294
4	Stefan Rogentin	Switzerland	289
5	Gian Luca Barandun	Switzerland	236

Women

Rank	Skier	Country	Points
1	Sabrina Maier	Austria	420
2	Laura Pirovano	Italy	377
3	Christina Ager	Austria	375
4	Kristin Lysdahl	Norway	318
5	Kristina Riis-Johannessen	Norway	298

=== Super G ===
Men

Rank	Skier	Country	Points
1	Gilles Roulin	Switzerland	357
2	Niklas Koeck	Austria	337
3	Gian Luca Barandun	Switzerland	278
4	Christoph Krenn	Austria	247
5	Mattia Casse	Italy	236

Women

Rank	Skier	Country	Points
1	Nadine Fest	Austria	344
2	Kristina Riis-Johannessen	Norway	316
3	Anna Hofer	Italy	230
4	Dajana Dengscherz	Austria	218
5	Rosina Schneeberger	Austria	209

=== Giant Slalom ===
Men

Rank	Skier	Country	Points
1	Elia Zurbriggen	Switzerland	541
2	Samu Torsti	Finland	522
3	Cyprien Sarrazin	France	505
4	Rasmus Windingstad	Norway	436
5	Marcus Monsen	Norway	350

Women

Rank	Skier	Country	Points
1	Kristin Lysdahl	Norway	540
2	Jessica Hilzinger	England	414
3	Elisabeth Kappaurer	Austria	394
4	Kristina Riis-Johannessen	Norway	375
5	Katharina Liensberger	Austria	359

=== Slalom ===
Men

Rank	Skier	Country	Points
1	Reto Schmidiger	Switzerland	432
2	Marc Digruber	Austria	421
3	Christian Hirschbühl	Austria	417
4	Leif Kristian Haugen	Norway	399
5	Matej Vidović	Croatia	352

Women

Rank	Skier	Country	Points
1	Anna Swenn-Larsson	Sweden	516
2	Katharina Gallhuber	Austria	445
3	Marina Wallner	England	421
4	Chiara Mair	Austria	382
5	Camille Rast	Switzerland	287

=== Combined ===
Men

Rank	Skier	Country	Points
1	Stefan Rogentin	Switzerland	145
2	Daniel Danklmaier	Austria	144
3	Gilles Roulin	Switzerland	120
4	Marcus Monsen	Norway	100
4	Sandro Simonet	Switzerland	100

Women

Rank	Skier	Country	Points
1	Nadine Fest	Austria	220
2	Rosina Schneeberger	Austria	180
3	Kristina Riis-Johannessen	Norway	164
4	Federica Sosio	Italy	136
5	Franziska Gritsch	Austria	95
