= 2019–20 FIS Alpine Ski Europa Cup =

Alpine skiing competition

Discipline	Men	Women
Overall	(Norway) Atle Lie McGrath	(Austria) Nadine Fest
Downhill	(France) Valentin Giraud Moine	(Austria) Nadine Fest
Super-G	(Norway) Atle Lie McGrath	(Austria) Nadine Fest
Giant Slalom	(Austria) Dominik Raschner	(Sweden) Sara Rask
Slalom	(Germany) Sebastian Holzmann	(Germany) Jessica Hilzinger
Combined	(France) Robin Buffet	(Austria) Nadine Fest

Competition
Locations	16	15
Individual	38	34
Cancelled	7	5

2019–20 FIS Alpine Ski Europa Cup was the 49th season of the FIS Alpine Ski Europa Cup.

== Standings ==
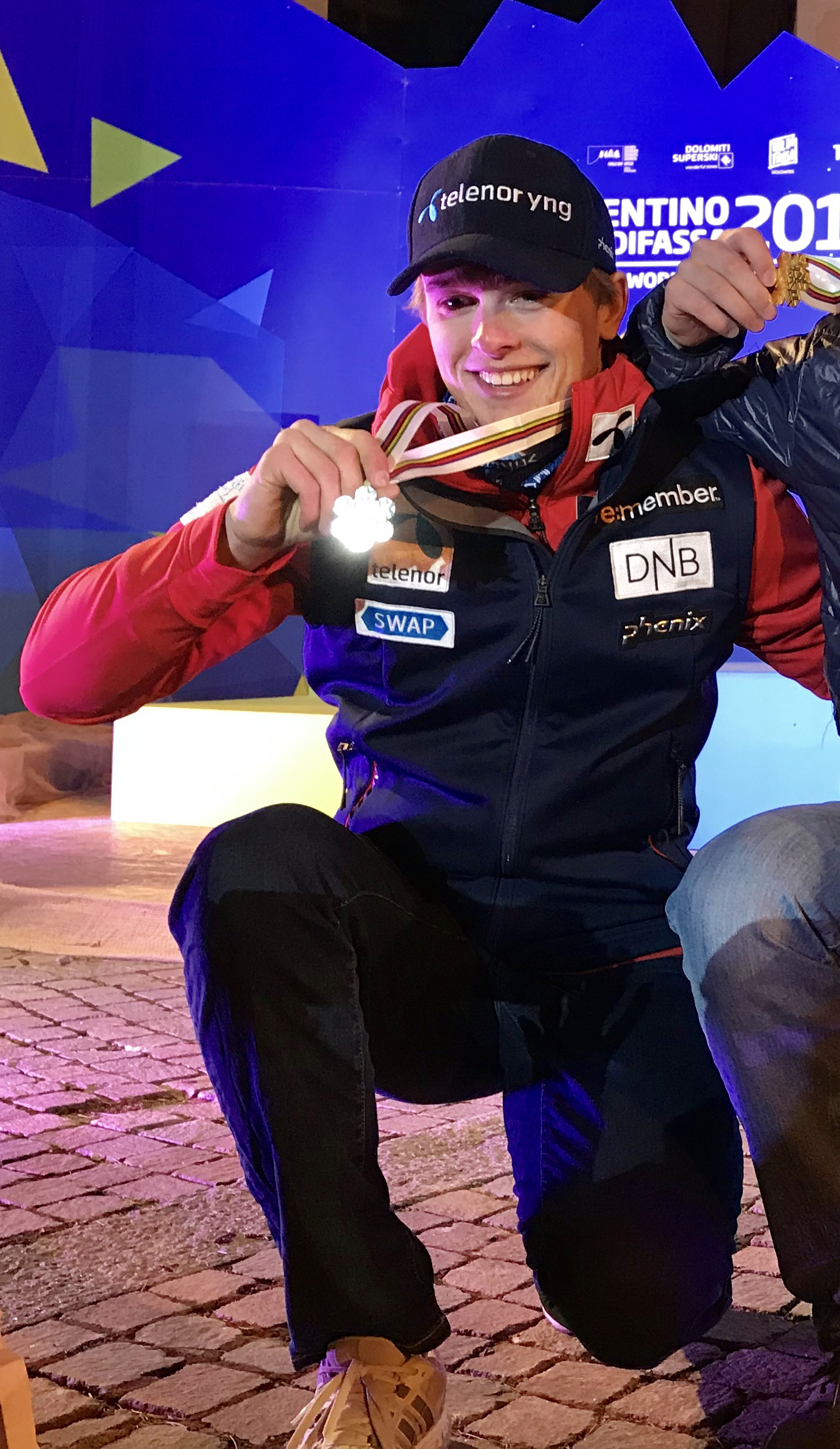
Atle Lie McGrath, the winner of the men's Europa Cup.

=== Overall ===
Men

Rank	Skier	Country	Points
1	Atle Lie McGrath	Norway	1081
2	Raphael Haaser	Austria	648
3	Niklas Köck	Austria	523
4	Alexander Prast	Italy	475
5	Sebastian Holzmann	Germany	404
6	Julian Rauchfuss	Germany	402
7	Roberto Nani	Italy	401
8	Federico Liberatore	Italy	351
9	Patrick Feurstein	Austria	348
10	Tommaso Sala	Italy	336

Women

Rank	Skier	Country	Points
1	Nadine Fest	Austria	1116
2	Rosina Schneeberger	Austria	763
3	Jessica Hilzinger	Germany	760
4	Sara Rask	Sweden	630
5	Rahel Kopp	Switzerland	541
6	Valentina Cillara Rossi	Italy	532
7	Ida Dannewitz	Sweden	494
8	Jasmina Suter	Switzerland	490
9	Tuva Norbye	Norway	413
10	Marta Rossetti	Italy	402

=== Downhill ===
Men

Rank	Skier	Country	Points
1	Valentin Giraud Moine	France	315
2	Niklas Köck	Austria	260
3	Daniel Hemetsberger	Austria	226
4	Nils Alphand	France	213
5	Davide Cazzaniga	Italy	210

Women

Rank	Skier	Country	Points
1	Nadine Fest	Austria	380
2	Rosina Schneeberger	Austria	290
3	Rahel Kopp	Switzerland	230
4	Juliana Suter	Switzerland	185
5	Valentina Cillara Rossi	Italy	183

=== Super-G ===
Men

Rank	Skier	Country	Points
1	Raphael Haaser	Austria	373
2	Alexander Prast	Italy	321
3	Niklas Köck	Austria	244
4	Atle Lie McGrath	Norway	196
5	Ralph Weber	Switzerland	165

Women

Rank	Skier	Country	Points
1	Nadine Fest	Austria	500
2	Ida Dannewitz	Sweden	273
3	Jasmina Suter	Switzerland	243
4	Rahel Kopp	Switzerland	212
5	Rosina Schneeberger	Austria	192

=== Giant Slalom ===
Men

Rank	Skier	Country	Points
1	Atle Lie McGrath	Norway	427
2	Roberto Nani	Italy	401
3	Patrick Feurstein	Austria	348
4	Fabian Wilkens Solheim	Norway	290
5	Bastian Meisen	Germany	244

Women

Rank	Skier	Country	Points
1	Sara Rask	Sweden	350
2	Doriane Escané	France	349
3	Elisa Mörzinger	Austria	319
4	Marte Monsen	Norway	317
5	Valentina Cillara Rossi	Italy	206

=== Slalom ===
Men

Rank	Skier	Country	Points
1	Sebastian Holzmann	Germany	364
2	Atle Lie McGrath	Norway	358
3	Federico Liberatore	Italy	351
4	Marc Rochat	Switzerland	256
5	Anton Tremmel	Germany	249

Women

Rank	Skier	Country	Points
1	Jessica Hilzinger	Germany	510
2	Marta Rossetti	Italy	402
3	Martina Peterlini	Italy	385
3	Elena Stoffel	Switzerland	385
5	Joséphine Forni	France	282

=== Combined ===
Men

Rank	Skier	Country	Points
1	Robin Buffet	France	136
2	Atle Lie McGrath	Norway	100
3	Semyel Bissig	Switzerland	86
4	Giovanni Franzoni	Italy	80
4	Florian Loriot	France	80

Women

Rank	Skier	Country	Points
1	Nadine Fest	Austria	180
2	Jessica Hilzinger	Germany	110
3	Kristina Riis-Johannessen	Norway	100
4	Ida Dannewitz	Sweden	93
5	Rosina Schneeberger	Austria	92
