= FIS Freestyle Ski and Snowboarding World Championships 2015 – Women's parallel slalom =

The women's parallel slalom competition of the FIS Freestyle Ski and Snowboarding World Championships 2015 was held at Kreischberg, Austria on January 22 (qualifying and finals). 43 athletes from 19 countries competed.

== Results ==
=== Qualification ===
Each participant takes one run on either of the courses. After the first run, only the top 16 are allowed a second run on the opposite course.

Rank	Bib	Name	Country	Blue Course	Red Course	Overall Time	Notes
1	27	Alena Zavarzina	Russia	39.36	38.46	1:17.82	Q
2	18	Ester Ledecka	Czech Republic	38.73	39.38	1:18.11	Q
3	19	Marion Kreiner	Austria	40.49	37.70	1:18.19	Q
4	30	Julia Dujmovits	Austria	38.17	40.03	1:18.20	Q
5	35	Julie Zogg	Switzerland	39.99	38.79	1:18.78	Q
6	28	Amelie Kober	Germany	38.85	40.03	1:18.88	Q
7	29	Patrizia Kummer	Switzerland	40.97	38.04	1:19.01	Q
8	25	Ina Meschik	Austria	41.05	38.05	1:19.10	Q
9	32	Selina Jörg	Germany	38.85	40.26	1:19.11	Q
10	31	Yekaterina Tudegesheva	Russia	40.33	39.00	1:19.33	Q
11	23	Hilde-Katrine Engeli	Norway	40.78	38.65	1:19.43	Q
12	20	Natalia Soboleva	Russia	39.15	40.29	1:19.44	Q
13	37	Ekaterina Khatomchenkova	Russia	40.27	39.24	1:19.51	Q
14	26	Sabine Schöffmann	Austria	38.51	41.09	1:19.60	Q
15	24	Tomoka Takeuchi	Japan	38.71	41.06	1:19.77	Q
16	17	Nadya Ochner	Italy	40.60	39.38	1:19.98	Q
17	46	Nicolien Sauerbreij	Netherlands	39.75	40.51	1:20.26	
18	21	Anke Karstens	Germany	40.28	40.17	1:20.45	
19	39	Ladina Jenny	Switzerland	41.26	39.73	1:20.99	
20	43	Aleksandra Krol	Poland	41.10	40.13	1:21.23	
21	50	Karolina Sztokfisz	Poland	40.56	40.75	1:21.31	
22	40	Corinna Boccacini	Italy	41.10	40.26	1:21.36	
23	41	Michelle Dekker	Netherlands	41.02	40.38	1:21.40	
24	44	Gloria Kotnik	Slovenia	41.27	40.57	1:21.84	
25	36	Ariane Lavigne	Canada	41.24	41.17	1:22.41	
26	49	Svetlana Boldykova	Russia	41.96	40.57	1:22.53	
27	48	Jeong Hae-Rim	South Korea	41.22	41.70	1:22.92	
28	47	Emilie Aurange	France	43.13	40.97	1:24.10	
29	52	Niu Jiaqi	China	42.69	47.97	1:30.66	
30	33	Marianne Leeson	Canada	DSQ	39.29	DSQ	
31	34	Isabella Laböck	Germany	39.32	DSQ	DSQ	
32	22	Caroline Calvé	Canada	40.01	DSQ	DSQ	
33	53	Zang Ruxin	China		42.65	42.65	
34	51	Shin Da-Hae	South Korea		42.93	42.93	
35	38	Weronika Biela	Poland	43.75		43.75	
36	56	Lu Wenping	China	44.18		44.18	
37	57	Oleksandra Malovanna	Ukraine		49.03	49.03	
38	59	Dariya Slobodkina	Kazakhstan		50.80	50.80	
39	58	Vanda Viszlay	Hungary	51.69		51.69	
40	54	Gong Naiying	China	55.23		55.23	
	55	Nina Micic	Serbia		DSQ	DSQ	
	45	Eri Yanetani	Japan		DSQ	DSQ	
	42	Stefanie Müller	Switzerland	DSQ		DSQ	

=== Elimination round ===
Round of 16
4	Julia Dujmovits (AUT)	W
13	Ekaterina Khatomchenkova (RUS)	+1.03
5	Julie Zogg (SUI)	W
12	Natalia Soboleva (RUS)	+0.30
8	Ina Meschik (AUT)	DSQ
9	Selina Jörg (GER)	W
1	Alena Zavarzina (RUS)	W
16	Nadya Ochner (ITA)	+0.50
2	Ester Ledecka (CZE)	W
15	Tomoka Takeuchi (JPN)	+1.58
7	Patrizia Kummer (SUI)	+0.35
10	Yekaterina Tudegesheva (RUS)	W
6	Amelie Kober (GER)	W
11	Hilde-Katrine Engeli (NOR)	+0.11
3	Marion Kreiner (AUT)	W
14	Sabine Schöffmann (AUT)	+0.12

Quarterfinals
4	Julia Dujmovits (AUT)	W
5	Julie Zogg (SUI)	+1.30
9	Selina Jörg (GER)	W
1	Alena Zavarzina (RUS)	+3.01
2	Ester Ledecka (CZE)	W
10	Yekaterina Tudegesheva (RUS)	+0.59
6	Amelie Kober (GER)	DSQ
3	Marion Kreiner (AUT)	W

Semifinals
4	Julia Dujmovits (AUT)	W
9	Selina Jörg (GER)	+0.07
2	Ester Ledecka (CZE)	W
3	Marion Kreiner (AUT)	+0.24

Finals
4	Julia Dujmovits (AUT)	DSQ
2	Ester Ledecka (CZE)	W
Third place
9	Selina Jörg (GER)	+0.04
3	Marion Kreiner (AUT)	W
