= FIS Freestyle Ski and Snowboarding World Championships 2015 – Women's parallel giant slalom =

The women's parallel giant slalom competition of the FIS Freestyle Ski and Snowboarding World Championships 2015 was held at Kreischberg, Austria on January 23 (qualifying and finals). 43 athletes from 19 countries competed.

== Results ==
=== Qualification ===
Each participant takes one run on either of the courses. After the first run, only the top 16 are allowed a second run on the opposite course.

Rank	Bib	Name	Country	Blue Course	Red Course	Overall Time	Notes
1	21	Ester Ledecka	Czech Republic	37.80	36.02	1:13.82	Q
2	30	Marion Kreiner	Austria	37.14	37.28	1:14.42	Q
3	17	Patrizia Kummer	Switzerland	38.64	36.97	1:15.61	Q
4	40	Claudia Riegler	Austria	38.17	37.79	1:15.96	Q
5	29	Marianne Leeson	Canada	38.75	37.33	1:16.08	Q
6	18	Yekaterina Tudegesheva	Russia	37.50	38.73	1:16.23	Q
7	25	Tomoka Takeuchi	Japan	38.86	37.44	1:16.30	Q
8	34	Julie Zogg	Switzerland	38.19	38.38	1:16.57	Q
9	19	Caroline Calvé	Canada	38.97	37.74	1:16.71	Q
10	28	Selina Jörg	Germany	38.53	38.44	1:16.97	Q
11	31	Alena Zavarzina	Russia	39.60	37.43	1:17.03	Q
12	20	Sabine Schöffmann	Austria	38.40	38.71	1:17.11	Q
13	27	Julia Dujmovits	Austria	39.18	38.07	1:17.25	Q
14	33	Isabella Laböck	Germany	39.32	37.94	1:17.26	Q
15	26	Amelie Kober	Germany	39.59	37.75	1:17.34	Q
16	23	Anke Karstens	Germany	39.14	38.33	1:17.47	Q
17	22	Nadya Ochner	Italy	38.77	38.75	1:17.52	
18	47	Nicolien Sauerbreij	Netherlands	39.40	38.35	1:17.75	
19	46	Eri Yanetani	Japan	38.89	38.90	1:17.79	
20	24	Natalia Soboleva	Russia	38.96	38.96	1:17.92	
21	35	Ariane Lavigne	Canada	39.64	38.71	1:18.35	
22	42	Stefanie Müller	Switzerland	39.29	39.12	1:18.41	
23	32	Hilde-Katrine Engeli	Norway	39.21	39.21	1:18.42	
24	38	Ladina Jenny	Switzerland	39.55	38.88	1:18.43	
25	41	Michelle Dekker	Netherlands	39.71	39.05	1:18.76	
26	43	Aleksandra Krol	Poland	40.03	38.89	1:18.92	
27	39	Corinna Boccacini	Italy	40.17	38.77	1:18.94	
28	51	Shin Da-Hae	South Korea	39.60	39.39	1:18.99	
29	45	Cheyenne Loch	Germany	40.27	38.87	1:19.14	
30	36	Ekaterina Khatomchenkova	Russia	40.65	38.80	1:19.45	
31	48	Emilie Aurange	France	40.15	39.68	1:19.83	
32	44	Gloria Kotnik	Slovenia	40.08	40.16	1:20.24	
33	37	Weronika Biela	Poland		39.47	39.47	
34	53	Zang Ruxin	China		40.67	40.67	
35	50	Karolina Sztokfisz	Poland	40.80		40.80	
36	55	Nina Micic	Serbia		40.85	40.85	
37	52	Niu Jiaqi	China	41.32		41.32	
38	49	Jeong Hae-Rim	South Korea		41.59	41.59	
39	54	Gong Naiying	China	41.70		41.70	
40	56	Lu Wenping	China	42.02		42.02	
41	57	Oleksandra Malovanna	Ukraine		42.29	42.29	
42	59	Dariya Slobodkina	Kazakhstan		46.71	46.71	
43	58	Vanda Viszlay	Hungary	47.05		47.05	

=== Elimination round ===
Round of 16
4	Claudia Riegler (AUT)	W
13	Julia Dujmovits (AUT)	+0.66
5	Marianne Leeson (CAN)	W
12	Sabine Schöffmann (AUT)	DSQ
8	Julie Zogg (SUI)	W
9	Caroline Calvé (CAN)	+1.37
1	Ester Ledecka (CZE)	W
16	Anke Karstens (GER)	+5.05
2	Marion Kreiner (AUT)	W
15	Amelie Kober (GER)	+7.80
7	Tomoka Takeuchi (JPN)	W
10	Selina Jörg (GER)	+0.23
6	Yekaterina Tudegesheva (RUS)	+0.87
11	Alena Zavarzina (RUS)	W
3	Patrizia Kummer (SUI)	W
14	Isabella Laböck (GER)	+0.64

Quarterfinals
4	Claudia Riegler (AUT)	W
5	Marianne Leeson (CAN)	+0.93
8	Julie Zogg (SUI)	W
1	Ester Ledecka (CZE)	+1.36
2	Marion Kreiner (AUT)	+6.08
7	Tomoka Takeuchi (JPN)	W
11	Alena Zavarzina (RUS)	W
3	Patrizia Kummer (SUI)	+0.07

Semifinals
4	Claudia Riegler (AUT)	W
8	Julie Zogg (SUI)	+0.54
7	Tomoka Takeuchi (JPN)	+0.30
11	Alena Zavarzina (RUS)	W

Finals
4	Claudia Riegler (AUT)	W
11	Alena Zavarzina (RUS)	DSQ
Third place
8	Julie Zogg (SUI)	+1.56
7	Tomoka Takeuchi (JPN)	W
