= FIS Freestyle Ski and Snowboarding World Championships 2017 – Women's parallel slalom =

The women's parallel slalom competition of the FIS Freestyle Ski and Snowboarding World Championships 2017 was held at Sierra Nevada, Spain on March 15 (qualifying and finals). 37 athletes from 17 countries competed.

== Results ==
=== Qualification ===
Each participant takes one run on either of the courses. After the first run, only the top 32 are allowed a second run on the opposite course.

Rank	Bib	Name	Country	Blue Course	Red Course	Overall Time	Notes
1	4	Daniela Ulbing	Austria	31.81	33.35	1:05.16	Q
2	1	Ester Ledecka	Czech Republic	34.42	31.50	1:05.92	Q
3	18	Cheyenne Loch	Germany	32.96	33.17	1:06.13	Q
4	13	Alena Zavarzina	Russia	33.72	32.66	1:06.38	Q
5	8	Ina Meschik	Austria	33.02	33.68	1:06.70	Q
6	6	Julia Dujmovits	Austria	33.06	33.80	1:06.86	Q
7	5	Ramona Theresia Hofmeister	Germany	34.24	32.63	1:06.87	Q
8	7	Patrizia Kummer	Switzerland	34.49	32.43	1:06.92	Q
9	16	Sabine Schöffmann	Austria	33.07	33.92	1:06.99	Q
10	14	Yekaterina Tudegesheva	Russia	32.75	34.32	1:07.07	Q
11	10	Tomoka Takeuchi	Japan	32.80	34.38	1:07.18	Q
12	9	Aleksandra Krol	Poland	34.64	32.78	1:07.42	Q
13	12	Julie Zogg	Switzerland	33.51	34.02	1:07.53	Q
14	17	Selina Jörg	Germany	34.37	33.37	1:07.74	Q
15	19	Ekaterina Khatomchenkova	Russia	34.33	33.70	1:08.03	Q
16	15	Carolin Langenhorst	Germany	34.68	33.41	1:08.09	Q
17	32	Annamari Dancha	Ukraine	33.82	34.56	1:08.38	
18	20	Natalia Soboleva	Russia	33.75	34.75	1:08.50	
19	2	Michelle Dekker	Netherlands	34.00	34.57	1:08.57	
20	24	Weronika Biela	Poland	34.60	34.55	1:09.15	
21	26	Jeong Hae-Rim	South Korea	34.80	35.00	1:09.80	
22	23	Gloria Kotnik	Slovenia	35.37	34.90	1:10.27	
23	11	Nadya Ochner	Italy	37.80	32.66	1:10.46	
24	33	Karolina Sztokfisz	Poland	36.46	34.19	1:10.65	
25	28	Zang Ruxin	China	34.99	35.95	1:10.94	
26	34	Xu Xiaoxiao	China	35.47	35.57	1:11.04	
27	25	Gong Naiying	China	35.88	35.30	1:11.18	
28	37	Teodora Pentcheva	Bulgaria	37.14	34.63	1:11.77	
29	31	Maggie Carrigan	United States	37.38	35.13	1:12.51	
30	30	Katrina Gerencser	Canada	35.87	36.69	1:12.56	
31	29	Megan Farrell	United States	41.61	35.35	1:16.96	
32	27	Shin Da-Hae	South Korea	45.58	34.48	1:20.06	
33	3	Ladina Jenny	Switzerland		36.22	36.22	
34	35	Iva Polanec	Slovenia		36.34	36.34	
35	22	Eri Yanetani	Japan	36.70		36.70	
36	36	Elif Kubra Geneske	Turkey	45.87		45.87	
	39	Stefanie Müller	Switzerland		DNF	DNF	

=== Elimination round ===
Round of 16
4	Alena Zavarzina (RUS)	W
13	Julie Zogg (SUI)	+0.62
5	Ina Meschik (AUT)	+0.03
12	Aleksandra Krol (POL)	W
8	Patrizia Kummer (SUI)	W
9	Sabine Schöffmann (AUT)	DSQ
1	Daniela Ulbing (AUT)	W
16	Carolin Langenhorst (GER)	DSQ
2	Ester Ledecka (CZE)	W
15	Ekaterina Khatomchenkova (RUS)	+4.93
7	Ramona T. Hofmeister (GER)	W
10	Yekaterina Tudegesheva (RUS)	+0.11
6	Julia Dujmovits (AUT)	W
11	Tomoka Takeuchi (JPN)	DSQ
3	Cheyenne Loch (GER)	W
14	Selina Jörg (GER)	+0.27

Quarterfinals
4	Alena Zavarzina (RUS)	W
12	Aleksandra Krol (POL)	+0.79
8	Patrizia Kummer (SUI)	+0.08
1	Daniela Ulbing (AUT)	W
2	Ester Ledecka (CZE)	W
7	Ramona T. Hofmeister (GER)	DSQ
6	Julia Dujmovits (AUT)	+0.01
3	Cheyenne Loch (GER)	W

Semifinals
4	Alena Zavarzina (RUS)	+5.97
1	Daniela Ulbing (AUT)	W
2	Ester Ledecka (CZE)	W
3	Cheyenne Loch (GER)	+4.33

Finals
1	Daniela Ulbing (AUT)	W
2	Ester Ledecka (CZE)	+0.27
Third place
4	Alena Zavarzina (RUS)	W
3	Cheyenne Loch (GER)	+0.57
