= Norway at the FIS Alpine World Ski Championships 2021 =

Norway at the 2021 FIS Alpine World Ski Championships
- IOC code: NOR
- National federation: Norwegian Ski Federation
- Website: www.skiforbundet.no

in (Italy) Cortina d'Ampezzo
- Competitors: 12 (7 men, 6 women)
- Medals Ranked 4th: Gold 2 Silver 0 Bronze 1 Total 3

FIS Alpine World Ski Championships appearances
- 1931; 1932; 1933; 1934; 1935; 1936; 1937; 1938; 1939; 1948; 1950; 1952; 1954; 1956; 1958; 1960; 1962; 1964; 1966; 1968; 1970; 1972; 1974; 1976; 1978; 1980; 1982; 1985; 1987; 1989; 1991; 1993; 1996; 1997; 1999; 2001; 2003; 2005; 2007; 2009; 2011; 2013; 2015; 2017; 2019; 2021

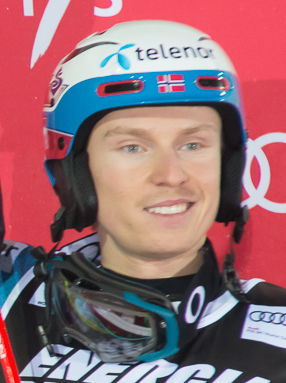
Henrik Kristoffersen a bronze medal at Cortina 2021.

Norway competed at the FIS Alpine World Ski Championships 2021 in Cortina d'Ampezzo, Norway, from 8 to 21 February 2021.

== Medalists ==
Athlete	Gendre	Event	Medal
Sebastian Foss-Solevåg	Men	Slalom	gold
Sebastian Foss-Solevåg; Fabian Wilkens Solheim; Kristin Lysdahl; Kristina Riis-Johannessen; Thea Louise Stjernesund	Mixed	Team Event	gold
Henrik Kristoffersen	Men	Slalom	bronze

== See also ==
- Norway national alpine ski team
