= FIS Freestyle Ski and Snowboarding World Championships 2025 – Women's parallel slalom =

Women's parallel slalom at the FIS Freestyle Ski and Snowboarding World Championships 2025
- Location: Corviglia, Switzerland
- Dates: 22 March
- Competitors: 52 from 20 nations

Medalists
gold medal	Tsubaki Miki	Japan
silver medal	Ester Ledecká	Czech Republic
bronze medal	Michelle Dekker	Netherlands

The Women's parallel slalom competition at the FIS Freestyle Ski and Snowboarding World Championships 2025 was held on 22 March 2025.

== Qualification ==
The qualification was started at 09:00. After the first run, the top 16 snowboarders on each course were allowed a second run on the opposite course.

Rank	Bib	Name	Country	Blue course	Red course	Total	Notes
1	17	Tsubaki Miki	Japan	36.73	33.25	1:09.98	Q
2	25	Ramona Theresia Hofmeister	Germany	37.03	34.51	1:11.54	Q
3	20	Julie Zogg	Switzerland	35.16	37.36	1:12.52	Q
4	22	Claudia Riegler	Austria	35.51	37.23	1:12.74	Q
5	19	Michelle Dekker	Netherlands	36.97	35.96	1:12.93	Q
6	18	Ester Ledecká	Czech Republic	37.04	36.00	1:13.04	Q
7	29	Zuzana Maděrová	Czech Republic	38.03	35.34	1:13.37	Q
8	21	Jasmin Coratti	Italy	37.78	35.80	1:13.58	Q
9	42	Elisa Fava	Italy	36.52	37.07	1:13.59	Q
10	24	Sabine Payer	Austria	36.31	37.38	1:13.69	Q
11	45	Martina Ankele	Austria	37.62	36.11	1:13.73	Q
12	39	Melanie Hochreiter	Germany	37.62	36.12	1:13.74	Q
13	30	Flurina Neva Bätschi	Switzerland	36.35	37.40	1:13.75	Q
14	43	Carmen Kainz	Austria	38.03	36.40	1:14.43	Q
15	32	Aleksandra Król-Walas	Poland	36.90	37.59	1:14.49	Q
16	46	Xenia von Siebenthal	Switzerland	36.85	37.78	1:14.63	Q
17	28	Cheyenne Loch	Germany	35.90	38.79	1:14.69	
18	27	Elisa Caffont	Italy	39.51	35.19	1:14.70	
19	34	Ladina Caviezel	Switzerland	37.12	37.68	1:14.80	
20	33	Aurélie Moisan	Canada	39.04	36.04	1:15.08	
21	41	Gong Naiying	China	38.64	36.69	1:15.33	
22	38	Annamari Dancha	Ukraine	36.99	39.34	1:16.33	
23	35	Kaylie Buck	Canada	39.47	37.13	1:16.60	
24	37	Jeong Hae-rim	South Korea	39.84	36.91	1:16.75	
25	44	Peng Cheng	China	38.15	38.77	1:16.92	
26	51	Nadiia Hapatyn	Ukraine	39.50	37.49	1:16.99	
27	54	Weronika Dawidek	Poland	37.94	39.09	1:17.03	
28	26	Iris Pflum	United States	36.77	40.27	1:17.04	
29	56	Asa Toyoda	Japan	39.02	38.45	1:17.47	
30	36	Maria Bukowska-Chyc	Poland	38.68	39.26	1:17.94	
31	55	Kaiya Kizuka	United States	41.95	37.90	1:19.85	
32	31	Gloria Kotnik	Slovenia	DNF	37.29	—	
33	53	Karolina Poltorak	Poland		38.00	—	
34	59	Kong Binbin	China		38.57	—	
35	47	Millie Bongiorno	Australia		39.00	—	
36	61	Oleksandra Malovanna	Ukraine		39.55	—	
36	60	Klára Šonková	Czech Republic	39.55		—	
38	48	Adéla Keclíková	Czech Republic	39.94		—	
39	58	Bai Xinhui	China	40.74		—	
40	57	Alexa Bullis	United States		44.89	—	
41	50	Tomoka Takeuchi	Japan	45.06		—	
42	64	Mia Djagora	North Macedonia	48.18		—	
43	68	İrem Gezer	Turkey	48.65		—	
44	69	Dana Saramaka	Israel		49.72	—	
45	65	Anđela Đogić	Serbia		52.59	—	
46	66	Eva Djagora	North Macedonia	54.86		—	
	67	Selin Gülce Güler	Turkey		DNF	—	
	62	Olivia Strupp	United States	DNF		—	
	52	Vita Bodnaruk	Ukraine	DNF		—	
	49	Malena Zamfirova	Bulgaria		DNF	—	
	40	Larissa Gasser	Switzerland	DNF		—	
	23	Lucia Dalmasso	Italy		DNF	—	
	63	Nathalia dos Reis Monteiro	Brazil	Did not start			

== Elimination round ==
The 16 best racers advanced to the elimination round.

Round of 16
4 (Austria) Riegler
13 (Switzerland) Bätschi	DNF
5 (Netherlands) Dekker
12 (Germany) Hochreiter	DNF
8 (Italy) Coratti
9 (Italy) Fava	+0.15
1 (Japan) Miki
16 (Switzerland) von Siebenthal	+4.67
2 (Germany) Hofmeister	+0.02
15 (Poland) Król-Walas
7 (Czech Republic) Maděrová
10 (Austria) Payer	0.00
6 (Czech Republic) Ledecká
11 (Austria) Ankele	+0.79
3 (Switzerland) Zogg
14 (Austria) Kainz	+0.40

Quarterfinals
4 (Austria) Riegler	+2.83
5 (Netherlands) Dekker
8 (Italy) Coratti	+1.06
1 (Japan) Miki
15 (Poland) Król-Walas
7 (Czech Republic) Maděrová	DNF
6 (Czech Republic) Ledecká
3 (Switzerland) Zogg	+0.47

Semifinals
5 (Netherlands) Dekker	DNF
1 (Japan) Miki
15 (Poland) Król-Walas	+0.89
6 (Czech Republic) Ledecká

Final
1 (Japan) Miki
6 (Czech Republic) Ledecká	+1.08
Third place
5 (Netherlands) Dekker
15 (Poland) Król-Walas	+0.04
