= FIS Freestyle Ski and Snowboarding World Championships 2025 – Women's parallel giant slalom =

Women's parallel giant slalom at the FIS Freestyle Ski and Snowboarding World Championships 2025
- Location: Corviglia, Switzerland
- Dates: 20 March
- Competitors: 52 from 21 nations

Medalists
gold medal	Ester Ledecká	Czech Republic
silver medal	Tsubaki Miki	Japan
bronze medal	Aleksandra Król-Walas	Poland

The women's parallel giant slalom competition at the FIS Freestyle Ski and Snowboarding World Championships 2025 was held on 20 March 2025.

== Qualification ==
The qualification was started at 09:00. After the first run, the top 16 snowboarders on each course were allowed a second run on the opposite course.

Rank	Bib	Name	Country	Blue course	Red course	Total	Notes
1	42	Ester Ledecká	Czech Republic	44.49	45.07	1:29.56	Q
2	24	Tsubaki Miki	Japan	46.33	46.52	1:32.85	Q
3	21	Julie Zogg	Switzerland	46.79	46.08	1:32.87	Q
4	29	Claudia Riegler	Austria	46.95	46.49	1:33.44	Q
5	18	Lucia Dalmasso	Italy	46.67	47.29	1:33.96	Q
6	22	Aleksandra Król-Walas	Poland	46.57	47.45	1:34.02	Q
7	27	Zuzana Maděrová	Czech Republic	47.93	46.31	1:34.24	Q
8	41	Malena Zamfirova	Bulgaria	47.55	46.76	1:34.31	Q
9	28	Michelle Dekker	Netherlands	46.32	48.09	1:34.41	Q
10	43	Martina Ankele	Austria	47.38	47.10	1:34.48	Q
11	46	Bai Xinhui	China	46.76	47.80	1:34.56	Q
12	19	Ladina Caviezel	Switzerland	47.86	46.78	1:34.64	Q
13	36	Flurina Neva Bätschi	Switzerland	47.28	47.94	1:35.22	Q
14	30	Sabine Payer	Austria	46.75	48.49	1:35.24	Q
15	32	Cheyenne Loch	Germany	47.64	47.68	1:35.32	Q
16	23	Jasmin Coratti	Italy	48.65	47.02	1:35.67	Q
17	33	Aurélie Moisan	Canada	48.10	47.85	1:35.95	
18	35	Iris Pflum	United States	47.98	48.40	1:36.38	
19	49	Miriam Weis	Austria	48.71	47.79	1:36.50	
20	26	Ramona Theresia Hofmeister	Germany	50.37	46.18	1:36.55	
21	48	Adéla Keclíková	Czech Republic	47.75	49.19	1:36.94	
22	34	Tomoka Takeuchi	Japan	47.35	49.94	1:37.29	
23	31	Gloria Kotnik	Slovenia	48.79	48.65	1:37.44	
24	45	Elisa Fava	Italy	49.21	48.41	1:37.62	
25	38	Melanie Hochreiter	Germany	48.38	49.82	1:38.20	
26	25	Annamari Dancha	Ukraine	49.47	49.40	1:38.87	
27	59	Peng Cheng	China	50.11	48.98	1:39.09	
28	52	Weronika Dawidek	Poland	50.04	49.86	1:39.90	
29	56	Millie Bongiorno	Australia	49.76	50.41	1:40.17	
30	57	Klára Šonková	Czech Republic	51.19	49.46	1:40.65	
31	39	Maria Bukowska-Chyc	Poland	52.81	48.16	1:40.97	
32	40	Gong Naiying	China	47.68	DNF	—	
33	53	Kaiya Kizuka	United States		49.81	—	
34	47	Nadiia Hapatyn	Ukraine		50.40	—	
35	51	Karolina Poltorak	Poland		50.49	—	
36	50	Vita Bodnaruk	Ukraine	51.12		—	
37	55	Alexa Bullis	United States		51.45	—	
38	54	Asa Toyoda	Japan	53.49		—	
39	66	Selin Gülce Güler	Turkey	54.73		—	
40	61	Olivia Strupp	United States		55.23	—	
41	44	Jessica Keiser	Switzerland	56.13		—	
42	67	İrem Gezer	Turkey		58.92	—	
43	58	Oleksandra Malovanna	Ukraine	59.93		—	
44	63	Mia Djagora	North Macedonia		1:03.58	—	
45	65	Eva Djagora	North Macedonia		1:07.81	—	
	20	Elisa Caffont	Italy	DNF		—	
	62	Nathalia dos Reis Monteiro	Brazil	DNF		—	
	64	Anđela Đogić	Serbia	DNF		—	
	68	Dana Saramaka	Israel	DNF		—	
	17	Jeong Hae-rim	South Korea		DSQ	—	
	37	Kaylie Buck	Canada		DSQ	—	
	60	Dong Yuyue	China	DSQ		—	

== Elimination round ==
The 16 best racers advanced to the elimination round.

Round of 16
4 (Austria) Riegler
13 (Switzerland) Bätschi	+3.69
5 (Italy) Dalmasso	+0.11
12 (Switzerland) Caviezel
8 (Bulgaria) Zamfirova
9 (Netherlands) Dekker	+0.17
1 (Czech Republic) Ledecká
16 (Italy) Coratti	+3.21
2 (Japan) Miki
15 (Germany) Loch	+0.35
7 (Czech Republic) Maděrová	DNF
10 (Austria) Ankele
6 (Poland) Król-Walas
11 (China) Bai	DNF
3 (Switzerland) Zogg
14 (Austria) Payer	DNF

Quarterfinals
4 (Austria) Riegler	+0.05
12 (Switzerland) Caviezel
8 (Bulgaria) Zamfirova	DNF
1 (Czech Republic) Ledecká
2 (Japan) Miki
10 (Austria) Ankele	DNF
6 (Poland) Król-Walas
3 (Switzerland) Zogg	+0.05

Semifinals
12 (Switzerland) Caviezel	+0.55
1 (Czech Republic) Ledecká
2 (Japan) Miki
6 (Poland) Król-Walas	+0.01

Final
1 (Czech Republic) Ledecká
2 (Japan) Miki	+0.48
Third place
12 (Switzerland) Caviezel	+0.14
6 (Poland) Król-Walas
