= Paloniemi =

Paloniemi is a Finnish surname. Notable people with the surname include:

- Aila Paloniemi (born 1956), Finnish politician
- Santeri Paloniemi (born 1993), Finnish alpine skier
