= Nicole Agnelli =

Italian alpine skier (born 1992)

Nicole Agnelli (born 1992) is a retired Italian alpine skier.

She competed at the 2009 European Youth Olympic Winter Festival, the 2012 and 2013 Junior World Championships with a 33rd place as her best individual result, but on the other hand she won a silver medal in the 2012 team event.

She made her FIS Alpine Ski World Cup debut in December 2013 in Courchevel. She collected her first World Cup points in March 2014, finishing 21st in the Åre giant slalom. She improved to a 17th place in December 2014 in Kühtai, but then competed without finishing a single race in the 2015–16 or 2016–17 World Cup circuits.

She represented the sports club G.S. Fiamme Oro.
