= World Junior Alpine Skiing Championships 2013 =

International skiing competition

The World Junior Alpine Skiing Championships 2013 were the 32nd World Junior Alpine Skiing Championships, held between 21 and 26 February 2013 in Québec, Canada.

Speed events were held at Le Massif and technical events at Mont-Sainte-Anne.

== Medal winners ==
=== Men's events ===
Event	Gold		Silver		Bronze	
Downhill	Nils Mani; Switzerland	1:30.95	Thomas Mayrpeter; Austria	1:31.14	Valentin Giraud Moine; France	1:31.34
Super-G	Thomas Mayrpeter; Austria	58.49	Nils Mani; Switzerland	58.57	Adrian Smiseth Sejersted; Norway	58.90
Giant Slalom	Aleksander Aamodt Kilde; Norway	2:20.75	Alex Zingerle; Italy	2:21.23	Žan Kranjec; Slovenia	2:21.50
Slalom	Manuel Feller; Austria	1:59.40	Ramon Zenhäusern; Switzerland	2:00.16	Santeri Paloniemi; Finland	2:00.57
Combined	Henrik Kristoffersen; Norway		Gino Caviezel; Switzerland		Endre Bjertness; Norway	

=== Women's events ===
Event	Gold		Silver		Bronze	
Downhill	Jennifer Piot; France	1:11.18	Stephanie Venier; Austria	1:11.22	Romane Miradoli; France	1:11.42
Super-G	Stephanie Venier; Austria	1:00.89	Corinne Suter; Switzerland	1:01.69	Rosina Schneeberger; Austria	1:01.80
Giant Slalom	Lisa-Maria Zeller; Austria	2:22.23	Ragnhild Mowinckel; Norway	2:22.37	Romane Miradoli; France	2:22.85
Slalom	Magdalena Fjällström; Sweden	1:52.10	Michelle Gisin; Switzerland	1:52.54	Adeline Baud; France	1:52.64
Combined	Ragnhild Mowinckel; Norway		Maria Therese Tviberg; Norway		Adeline Baud; France	

=== Team event ===
Event	Gold	Silver	Bronze
Team event	Sweden; Nathalie Eklund; Charlotta Säfvenberg; Max Gordon Sundquist; Daniel Steding	Switzerland; Wendy Holdener; Rahel Kopp; Luca Aerni; Bernhard Niederberger	Canada; Tianda Carroll; Mikaela Tommy; Trevor Philp; Ford Swette
