= Charlotta Säfvenberg =

Swedish alpine skier (born 1994)

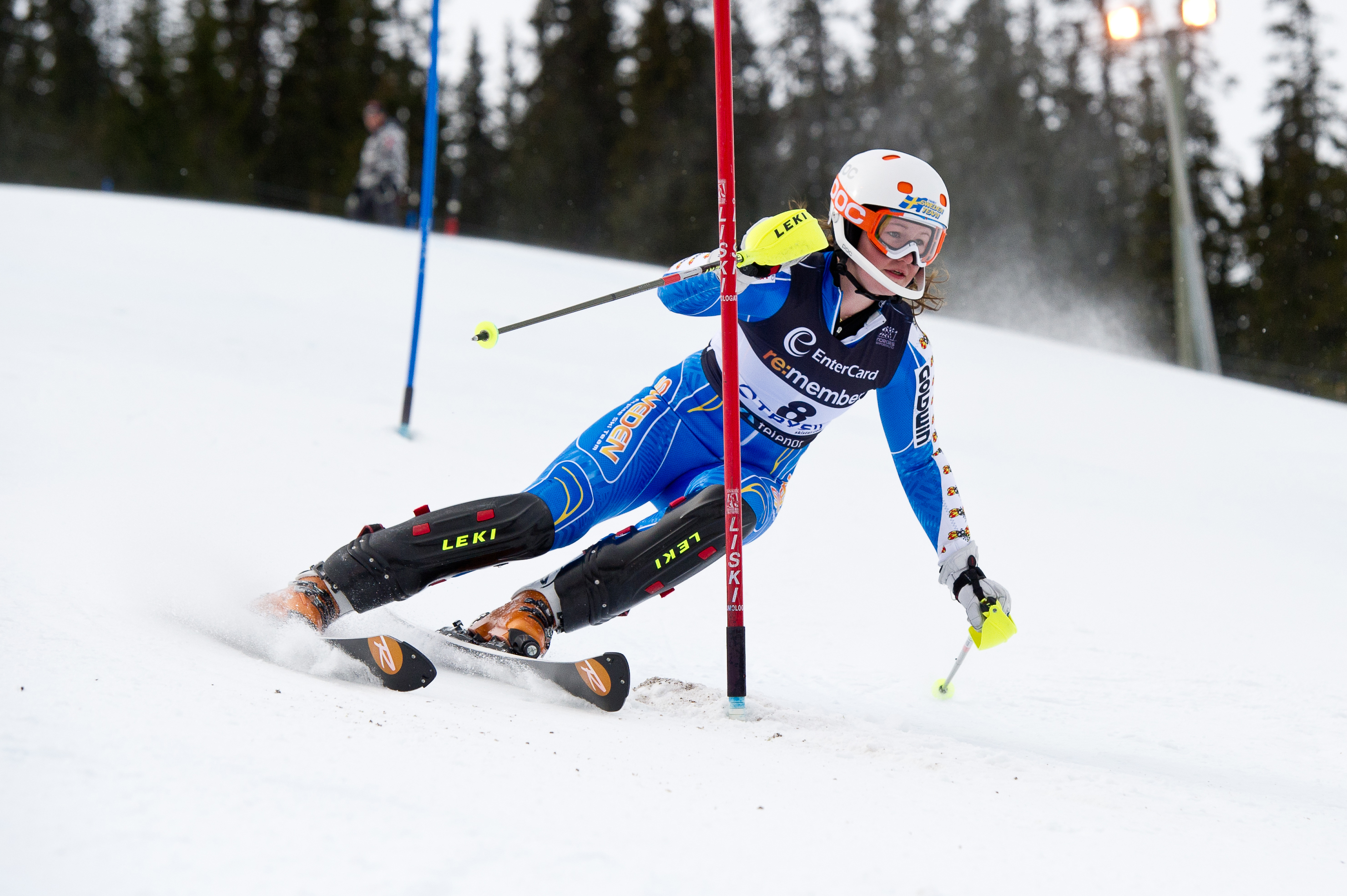
- Säfvenberg in Trysil

Personal information
- Born: 7 October 1994 (age 31)

Skiing career
- Sport: Alpine skiing
- Club: UHSK Umeå SK
- Disciplines: Slalom
- World Cup debut: 29 December 2012 (age 18)

Olympics
- Teams: 1 – (2022)
- Medals: 0

World Championships
- Teams: 1 - (2019)
- Medals: (0 gold)

World Cup
- Seasons: 8 – (2013–2016, 2018–2019, 2021-2022)
Medal record
Junior World Championships
Silver medal – second place	2014 Jasna	Slalom

Charlotta Säfvenberg (born 7 October 1994) is a Swedish alpine skier.

== Career ==
Competing at the Junior World Championships in 2011, 2012, 2013, 2014 and 2015, her biggest success were the 2014 Junior World Championships where she won the silver medal in slalom. She also won the slalom and the team event at the 2011 European Youth Olympic Winter Festival.

She made her FIS Alpine Ski World Cup debut in December 2012 in Semmering, being disqualified. She collected her first World Cup points with a 14th place in November 2013 in Levi. Steadily finishing around 15th–25th, she improved to two 10th places in a row, in January–February 2015 in Flachau and Maribor. She stabilized around 11th–21st-place finishes, also finishing 14th in slalom at the 2019 World Championships.

She represents the sports club UHSK Umeå SK.
