= Annie Winquist =

Norwegian alpine skier (born 1993)

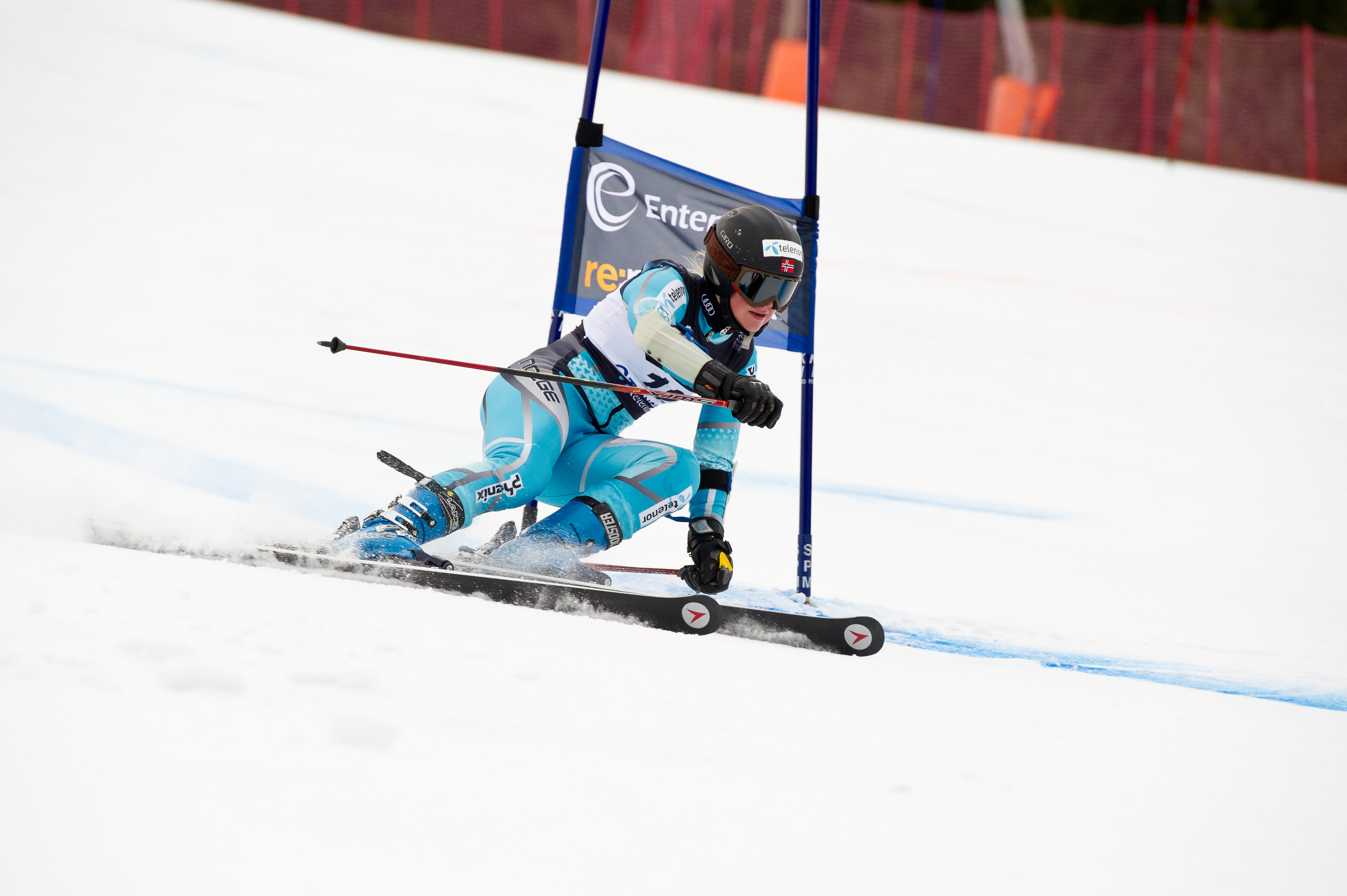

Annie Winquist (born 1993) is a retired Norwegian alpine skier.

She competed at the 2009 European Youth Olympic Winter Festival and the 2010, 2011, 2012 and 2013 World Junior Alpine Skiing Championships. The 2012 edition was by far her most successful, as she won the gold medal in super G and the silver medal in the combined event.

Winquist made her FIS Alpine Ski World Cup debut in March 2012 in Schladming, where she also collected her first World Cup points with a 24th place in super G. Competing in the Norwegian Championships between 2009 and 2013, she won two bronze medals and four silver medals overall.

She represented the sports club Lillehammer SK. Following a bout with injuries, she lost the sense of team belonging, and retired at the age of 21. She studied at Lillehammer University College and moved to Oslo.
