= Nathalie Eklund =

Nathalie Eklund may refer to:

- Nathalie Eklund (cyclist) (born 1991), Swedish professional racing cyclist
- Nathalie Eklund (alpine skier) (born 1992), retired Swedish alpine skier
