= FIS Freestyle Ski and Snowboarding World Championships 2023 – Women's parallel giant slalom =

Women's parallel giant slalom at the FIS Freestyle Ski and Snowboarding World Championships 2023
- Location: Bakuriani, Georgia
- Date: 19 February
- Competitors: 39 from 16 nations

Medalists
gold medal	Tsubaki Miki	Japan
silver medal	Daniela Ulbing	Austria
bronze medal	Aleksandra Król	Poland

The Women's parallel giant slalom competition at the FIS Freestyle Ski and Snowboarding World Championships 2023 was held on 19 February 2023.

== Qualification ==
The qualification was started at 08:30. After the first run, the top 16 snowboarders on each course were allowed a second run on the opposite course.

Rank	Bib	Name	Country	Blue course	Red course	Total	Notes
1	29	Daniela Ulbing	Austria	41.32	40.22	1:21.54	Q
2	37	Annamari Dancha	Ukraine	41.30	40.31	1:21.61	Q
3	30	Tsubaki Miki	Japan	39.38	42.24	1:21.62	Q
4	23	Claudia Riegler	Austria	42.38	39.42	1:21.80	Q
5	25	Aleksandra Król	Poland	41.39	40.72	1:22.11	Q
6	28	Julie Zogg	Switzerland	39.99	42.20	1:22.19	Q
7	18	Lucia Dalmasso	Italy	39.75	42.69	1:22.44	Q
8	22	Sabine Schöffmann	Austria	40.31	42.58	1:22.89	Q
9	17	Tomoka Takeuchi	Japan	42.97	39.93	1:22.90	Q
10	19	Carolin Langenhorst	Germany	42.50	40.53	1:23.03	Q
11	20	Ladina Jenny	Switzerland	39.73	43.31	1:23.04	Q
12	35	Nadya Ochner	Italy	42.64	40.51	1:23.15	Q
13	33	Jessica Keiser	Switzerland	41.94	41.21	1:23.15	Q
14	27	Ramona Theresia Hofmeister	Germany	43.43	39.96	1:23.39	Q
15	32	Melanie Hochreiter	Germany	40.90	42.60	1:23.50	Q
16	21	Patrizia Kummer	Switzerland	42.78	40.96	1:23.74	Q
17	26	Gloria Kotnik	Slovenia	40.87	42.98	1:23.85	
18	31	Michelle Dekker	Netherlands	41.60	43.01	1:24.61	
19	43	Dong Xue	China	43.16	42.34	1:25.50	
20	39	Jeong Hae-rim	South Korea	43.19	42.89	1:26.08	
21	49	Olimpia Kwiatkowska	Poland	44.14	43.07	1:27.21	
22	44	Kong Binbin	China	42.94	44.71	1:27.65	
23	38	Iris Pflum	United States	44.57	43.26	1:27.83	
24	54	Oleksandra Malovanna	Ukraine	43.85	44.55	1:28.40	
25	53	Nadiia Hapatyn	Ukraine	44.90	43.84	1:28.74	
26	42	Klára Šonková	Czech Republic	43.51	45.68	1:29.19	
27	41	Alexa Bullis	United States	45.18	44.01	1:29.19	
28	36	Elisa Caffont	Italy	40.61	50.65	1:31.26	
29	46	Vita Bodnaruk	Ukraine	43.67	49.19	1:32.86	
30	34	Zuzana Maděrová	Czech Republic	41.67	51.73	1:33.40	
31	52	Teodora Pentcheva	Bulgaria	44.72	DNF		
32	50	Martina Ankele	Austria	41.54	DSQ		
33	45	Millie Bongiorno	Australia		44.78		
34	48	Maria Chyc	Poland	44.80			
35	47	Jang Seo-hee	South Korea		44.89		
36	40	Abby Van Groningen	Canada	45.06			
37	51	Hinano Oshima	Japan		45.66		
38	55	Adéla Keclíková	Czech Republic		1:17.78		
	24	Cheyenne Loch	Germany	DSQ			

== Elimination round ==
The 16 best racers advanced to the elimination round.

Round of 16
4 (Austria) Riegler
13 (Switzerland) Keiser	DNF
5 (Poland) Król
12 (Italy) Ochner	+0.21
8 (Austria) Schöffmann
9 (Japan) Takeuchi	DNF
1 (Austria) Ulbing
16 (Switzerland) Kummer	+0.44
2 (Ukraine) Dancha
15 (Germany) Hochreiter	DNF
7 (Italy) Dalmasso
10 (Germany) Langenhorst	+0.06
6 (Switzerland) Zogg
11 (Switzerland) Jenny	DNF
3 (Japan) Miki
14 (Germany) Hofmeister	DNF

Quarterfinals
4 (Austria) Riegler	+4.50
5 (Poland) Król
8 (Austria) Schöffmann	+4.12
1 (Austria) Ulbing
2 (Ukraine) Dancha	+3.33
7 (Italy) Dalmasso
6 (Switzerland) Zogg	DNF
3 (Japan) Miki

Semifinals
5 (Poland) Król	+1.91
1 (Austria) Ulbing
7 (Italy) Dalmasso	DNF
3 (Japan) Miki

Final
1 (Austria) Ulbing	DNF
3 (Japan) Miki
Third place
5 (Poland) Król
7 (Italy) Dalmasso	+2.03
