= Magdalena Fjällström =

Swedish alpine skier

Personal information
- Born: 12 January 1995 (age 31)

Sport
- Sport: alpine skiing
- Club: Tärna IK Fjällvinden

Achievements and titles
- World finals: World Junior Alpine Skiing Championships 2013: gold in giant slalom

Magdalena Fjällström (born 12 January 1995) is a Swedish former alpine skier.

== Career ==
Competing at the Junior World Championships in 2011, 2012, 2013 and 2014, her biggest success came at the 2013 edition where she won the gold medal in giant slalom. Competing in four events at the 2012 Winter Youth Olympics, she won the gold medal in the combined. She also won the team event at the 2011 European Youth Olympic Winter Festival.

She made her FIS Alpine Ski World Cup debut in October 2012 in Sölden, being disqualified. She collected her first World Cup points with a 17th place in March 2013 in Lenzerheide. She improved to a 13th place in December 2013 in Lienz, but after collecting 45 World Cup points in 2013–14 she started struggling. Until New Years' 2019, she finished only two World Cup races, and exited or was disqualified in 22 races. Picking up the pace again, she improved to a 10th place in the slalom in February 2020 in Kranjska Gora. She finished 30th in giant slalom at the 2019 World Championships.

She represented the sports club Tärna IK Fjällvinden.
