= Ralph Weber =

Swiss alpine skier

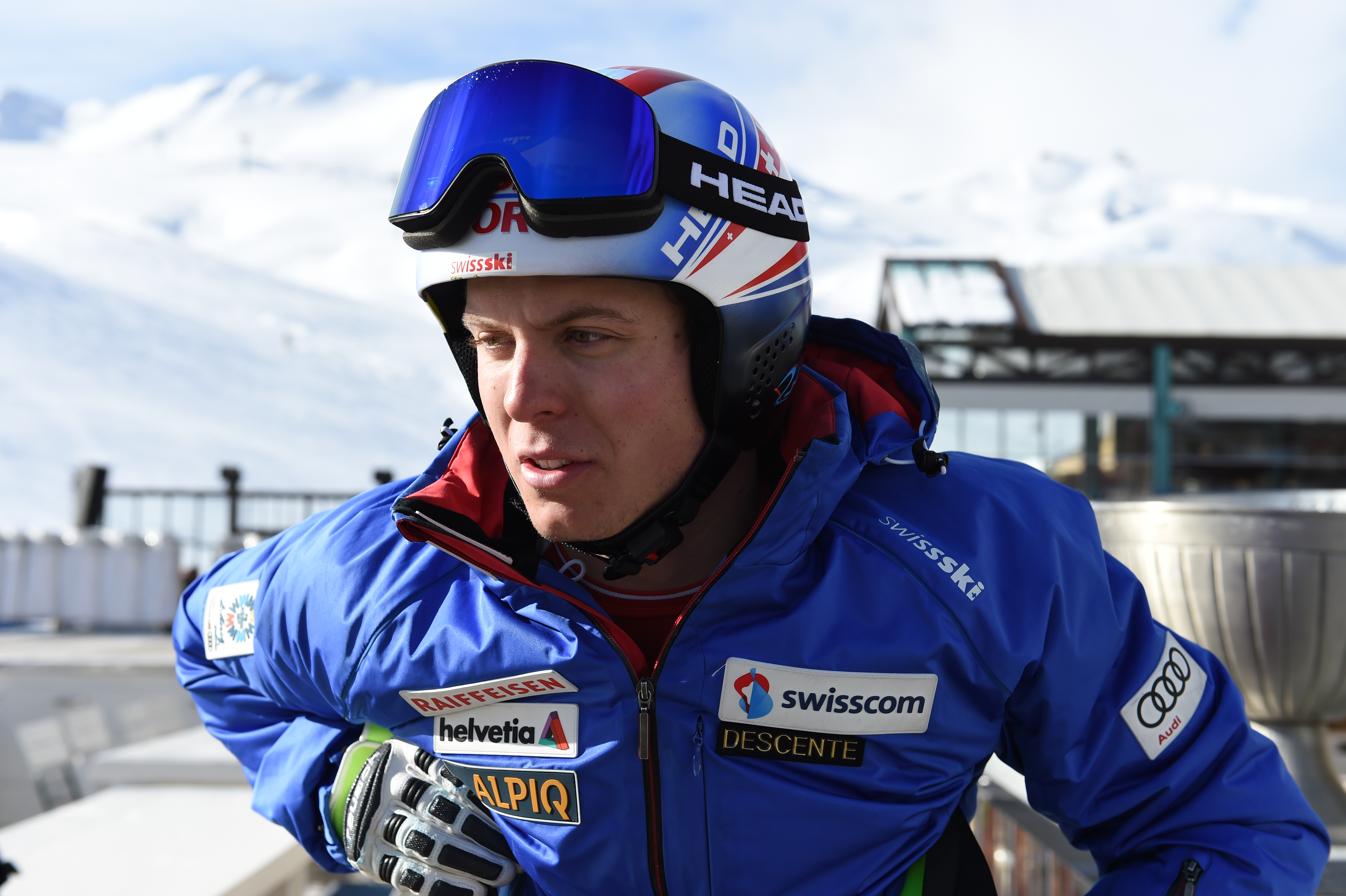

Personal information
- Born: 31 May 1993 (age 33) St. Gallen, Switzerland
- Height: 187 cm (6 ft 2 in)

Skiing career
- Sport: Alpine skiing
- Club: SC Flumserberg
- Disciplines: Downhill, Super-G, Alpine Combined
World Cup debut
15 March 2012 (age 18)

World Cup
- Seasons: 11
- Wins: 0
- Podiums: 0
- Overall titles: 0 – (108th in 2015)
- Discipline titles: 0 – (41st in DH, 2015)
Medal record
Men's alpine skiing
Representing Switzerland
World Junior Ski Championships
Gold medal – first place	2012 Roccaraso	Super-G
Silver medal – second place	2012 Roccaraso	Downhill

Ralph Weber (born 31 May 1993) is a Swiss alpine ski racer. Weber specializes in the speed events of Downhill and Super-G also skiing in the Alpine Combined discipline. Weber was the Junior World Champion in Super-G in 2012, making his World Cup debut in the same year on 15 March, 2012 in Schladming, Austria at the age of just 18.

== Career ==
Weber's first major appearance was at the 2011 Alpine Skiing Junior World Championships in Crans-Montana, Switzerland. He finished 9th in the downhill, and 17th in the Super-G. Having claimed his first podium at Europa Cup level, Weber competed in the 2012 Alpine Skiing Junior World Championships in Roccaraso, Italy. He claimed the silver medal in the Downhill, just 9 hundredths of a second behind the winner, and followed that with a gold in the Super-G the following day, ahead of teammate Nils Mani. As a result of the World Junior victory, by rule the winner is invited to take part in the World Cup Finals in that discipline, and Weber made his World Cup debut in the Super-G in Schladming, finishing in 22nd place. Weber was also the reserve for Switzerland in the Team Event, though he didn't take part in the race.

In the next two seasons, Weber was mainly concentrating on the Europa Cup, with just a few appearances in the 2013 and 2014 World Cups, without scoring any points. He was however able to claim his first Europa Cup victory in his home race in Wengen in 2013. Two more appearances at the Junior Worlds did not bring any more medals, and in fact Weber missed the rest of the 2014 season after suffering an injury in the Super-G at the 2014 Junior Worlds in Jasná, Slovakia.

2014-15 was to be the first season where Weber would compete in the majority of the 2015 World Cup races. He claimed his first World Cup points in the downhill in Santa Caterina, finishing in 10th place. Weber also picked up his first career points in Super-G, with a 25th-place finish in Saalbach.

Weber missed the start of the 2016 World Cup due to a knee injury suffered in pre-season training, however, Weber was back by the events in Val Gardena in mid-December. In his first World Cup race of the year Weber finished in 11th position in the Super-G, and the next day posted the 7th fastest intermediate time halfway through the downhill, before failing to finish. Courtesy of other skiers injuries and the result in the Super-G, Weber reached the top 30 in the World Cup Start List for the discipline. The races in Kitzbühel saw Weber claim points in Super-G, and his first career points in the Alpine Combined discipline. However, due to a race jury decision to cancel the famous downhill after 30 racers, Weber would have to wait another year to tackle the Streif for the first time.

== World Cup results ==
Season	Age	Overall	Slalom	Giant slalom	Super-G	Downhill	Combined
2015	21	108	—	—	50	41	—
2016	22	63	—	—	23	36	28
2017	23	112	—	—	32	51	—
2018	24	101	—	—	37	—	25
2019	25	157	—	—	61	—	—
2020	26	99	—	—	—	36	31
2021	27	95	—	—	52	31	—
2022	28	114	—	—	41	48	—

Downhill
Year	1	2	3	4	5	6	7	8	9	10	Fin.	Pos	Points
2012-13	LAK -	BEA -	VGA -	BOR; DNF	WEN -	KIT -	GAR -	KVI; 35			LEN -	-	0
2013-14	LAK; 51	BEA; 44	VGA -	BOR; 53	WEN; DSQ	KIT -	KVI -	KVI -			LEN -	-	0
2014-15	LAK; 43	BEA; 44	VGA; 36	SAN; 10	WEN; 40	KIT -	SAA; 40	GAR -	KVI; 38		MÉR -	41st	26
2015-16	LAK -	BEA -	VGA; DNF	SAN; 45	WEN; 46	KIT; DNS	GAR; 40	JEO; 13	CHA; 18	KVI; 25	STM -	36th	39
2016-17	ISE; 30	VGA; 48	KIT; 28	GAR; 36	GAR; 37	KVI; 36	KVI; 38				ASP -	51st	4
2017-18	LAK; 50	BEA; 40	VGA; 31	BOR; 45	WEN; 47	KIT; 43	GAR; 45	KVI; 48			ÅRE -	–	0
2018-19													
2019-20													
2020-21													
2021-22													
2022-23													

Super-G
Year	1	2	3	4	5	6	7	Fin.	Pos	Points
2011-12	LAK -	BEA -	VGA -	CRA -	CRA -	KVI -	KVI -	SCH; 22	-	0
2012-13	LAK -	BEA -	VGA -	KIT -	KVI; 46			LEN -	-	0
2014-15	LAK -	BEA -	VGA -	KIT -	SAA; 25	KVI; DNF		MÉR -	50th	6
2015-16	LAK -	BEA -	VGA; 11	KIT; 28	JEO; 14	HIN; 21	KVI; 12	STM; 12	23rd	99
2016-17	ISE; 25	VGA; 35	SAN; 44	KIT; 25	KVI; 21			ASP -	32nd	22
2017-18	LAK; 33	BEA; 22	VGA; 32	KIT; 19	KVI; 46			ÅRE -	37th	21
2018-19										
2019-20										
2020-21										
2021-22										
2022-23										

Alpine Combined
Year	1	2	3	Pos	Points
2014-15	WEN; DNF1	KIT -		-	0
2015-16	WEN; 35	KIT; 24	CHA; 22	28th	16
2016-17	SAN; DNF1	WEN; 34		-	0
2017-18	BOR; 16	WEN; 37		25th	15
2018-19					
2019-20					
2020-21					
2021-22					
2022-23					
