= FIS Alpine World Ski Championships 2017 – Women's super-G =

International sporting competition

Women's super-G at the FIS Alpine World Ski Championships 2017
- Venue: Piz Nair
- Location: St. Moritz, Switzerland
- Dates: 7 February
- Competitors: 46 from 20 nations
- Winning time: 1:21.34

Medalists
gold medal	Nicole Schmidhofer	Austria
silver medal	Tina Weirather	Liechtenstein
bronze medal	Lara Gut	Switzerland

The Women's super-G competition at the 2017 World Championships was held on 7 February 2017.

== Results ==
The race was started at 12:00.

Rank	Bib	Name	Country	Time	Diff
1st place, gold medalist(s)	8	Nicole Schmidhofer	Austria	1:21.34	
2nd place, silver medalist(s)	5	Tina Weirather	Liechtenstein	1:21.67	+0.33
3rd place, bronze medalist(s)	7	Lara Gut	Switzerland	1:21.70	+0.36
4	13	Viktoria Rebensburg	Germany	1:21.87	+0.53
5	1	Elena Curtoni	Italy	1:21.89	+0.55
6	16	Ragnhild Mowinckel	Norway	1:22.03	+0.69
7	3	Stephanie Venier	Austria	1:22.11	+0.77
8	19	Federica Brignone	Italy	1:22.18	+0.84
8	18	Tessa Worley	France	1:22.18	+0.84
10	4	Sofia Goggia	Italy	1:22.25	+0.91
11	9	Ilka Štuhec	Slovenia	1:22.38	+1.04
12	6	Corinne Suter	Switzerland	1:22.44	+1.10
13	20	Joana Hählen	Switzerland	1:22.56	+1.22
14	14	Laurenne Ross	United States	1:22.68	+1.34
15	30	Christine Scheyer	Austria	1:22.78	+1.44
16	12	Romane Miradoli	France	1:23.14	+1.80
17	31	Jasmine Flury	Switzerland	1:23.28	+1.94
17	2	Francesca Marsaglia	Italy	1:23.28	+1.94
19	27	Marie-Michèle Gagnon	Canada	1:23.30	+1.96
20	10	Tamara Tippler	Austria	1:23.42	+2.08
21	36	Kristina Riis-Johannessen	Norway	1:23.61	+2.27
22	32	Mikaela Tommy	Canada	1:23.66	+2.32
23	26	Tiffany Gauthier	France	1:23.69	+2.35
24	34	Aleksandra Prokopyeva	Russia	1:24.03	+2.69
25	25	Maria Therese Tviberg	Norway	1:24.06	+2.72
26	22	Candace Crawford	Canada	1:24.21	+2.87
27	33	Kristin Lysdahl	Norway	1:24.30	+2.96
28	24	Breezy Johnson	United States	1:24.34	+3.00
29	28	Ester Ledecká	Czech Republic	1:24.39	+3.05
30	35	Maruša Ferk	Slovenia	1:24.69	+3.35
31	23	Kira Weidle	Germany	1:24.71	+3.37
32	43	Maryna Gąsienica-Daniel	Poland	1:25.45	+4.11
33	29	Valérie Grenier	Canada	1:25.98	+4.64
34	41	Pavla Klicnarová	Czech Republic	1:26.03	+4.69
35	45	Macarena Simari Birkner	Argentina	1:26.51	+5.17
36	42	Kateřina Pauláthová	Czech Republic	1:27.36	+6.02
37	39	Sarah Schleper	Mexico	1:27.47	+6.13
38	40	Noelle Barahona	Chile	1:28.18	+6.84
39	46	Sabrina Simader	Kenya	1:30.02	+8.68
—	11	Lindsey Vonn	United States	DNF	
—	15	Kajsa Kling	Sweden	DNF	
—	17	Anna Veith	Austria	DNF	
—	21	Jacqueline Wiles	United States	DNF	
—	37	Leona Popović	Croatia	DNF	
—	38	Lisa Hörnblad	Sweden	DNF	
—	44	Alexandra Coletti	Monaco	DNF	
