= Alpine skiing at the 2011 European Youth Olympic Winter Festival =

- Venue: Ještěd, Liberec
- Date: 14–18 February

Alpine skiing at the 2011 European Youth Winter Olympic Festival was held from 13 to 18 February 2011. It was held at the Alpine Skiing Venue Ještěd at Liberec, Czech Republic.

== Results ==
=== Medal table ===
Rank	Nation	Gold	Silver	Bronze	Total
1	Norway (NOR)	2	0	1	3
2	Sweden (SWE)	2	0	0	2
3	Slovenia (SLO)	1	1	0	2
4	Italy (ITA)	0	2	1	3
5	Switzerland (SUI)	0	2	0	2
6	Austria (AUT)	0	0	2	2
7	Finland (FIN)	0	0	1	1
Totals (7 entries)		5	5	5	15

=== Men's events ===
Event	Gold		Silver		Bronze	
Giant Slalom	Henrik Kristoffersen (NOR)	1:36.92	Emanuele Buzzi (ITA)	1:37.43	Justus Kuukka (FIN)	1:38.19
Slalom	Henrik Kristoffersen (NOR)	1:24.10	Anthony Bonvin (SUI)	1:25.05	Adrian Smiseth Sejersted (NOR)	1:26.51

=== Women's events ===
Event	Gold		Silver		Bronze	
Giant Slalom	Eli Plut (SLO)	1:40.79	Karoline Pichler (ITA)	1:41.70	Sabrina Maier (AUT)	1:41.87
Slalom	Charlotta Säfvenberg (SWE)	1:24.89	Eli Plut (SLO)	1:24.92	Sabrina Maier (AUT)	1:25.87

=== Mixed events ===
Event	Gold	Silver	Bronze
Parallel Giant Slalom	Sweden (SWE); Lisa Blomqvist; Magdalena Fjällström; Charlotta Säfvenberg; Dan Axel Grahn; Felix Monsén; Max-Gordon Sundquist	Switzerland (SUI); Rahel Kopp; Corinne Suter; Samuel Antonin; Emanuel Bellwald; Anthony Bonwin	Italy (ITA); Valentina Cillara Rossi; Karoline Pichler; Federica Sosio; Emanuele Buzzi; Michele Gualazzi; Daniele Sorio
