= Alex Zingerle =

Italian alpine skier (born 1992)

Alex Zingerle (born 17 August 1992) is an Italian alpine skier.

== Career ==
He competed at the 2009 European Youth Olympic Winter Festival, the 2010, 2011, 2012 and 2013 Junior World Championships. He won a silver medal in the 2012 team event before winning the silver medal in the 2013 giant slalom.

He made his FIS Alpine Ski World Cup debut in December 2012 in Alta Badia. He collected his first World Cup points in December 2013, finishing 18th in the Val d'Isere giant slalom. He also recorded a 19th place in March 2014, but then competed without finishing a single race in the 2015–16, 2016–17 or 2017–18 World Cup circuits.

He represents the sports club GS Fiamme Gialle.
