= Christine Scheyer =

Austrian alpine skier (born 1994)

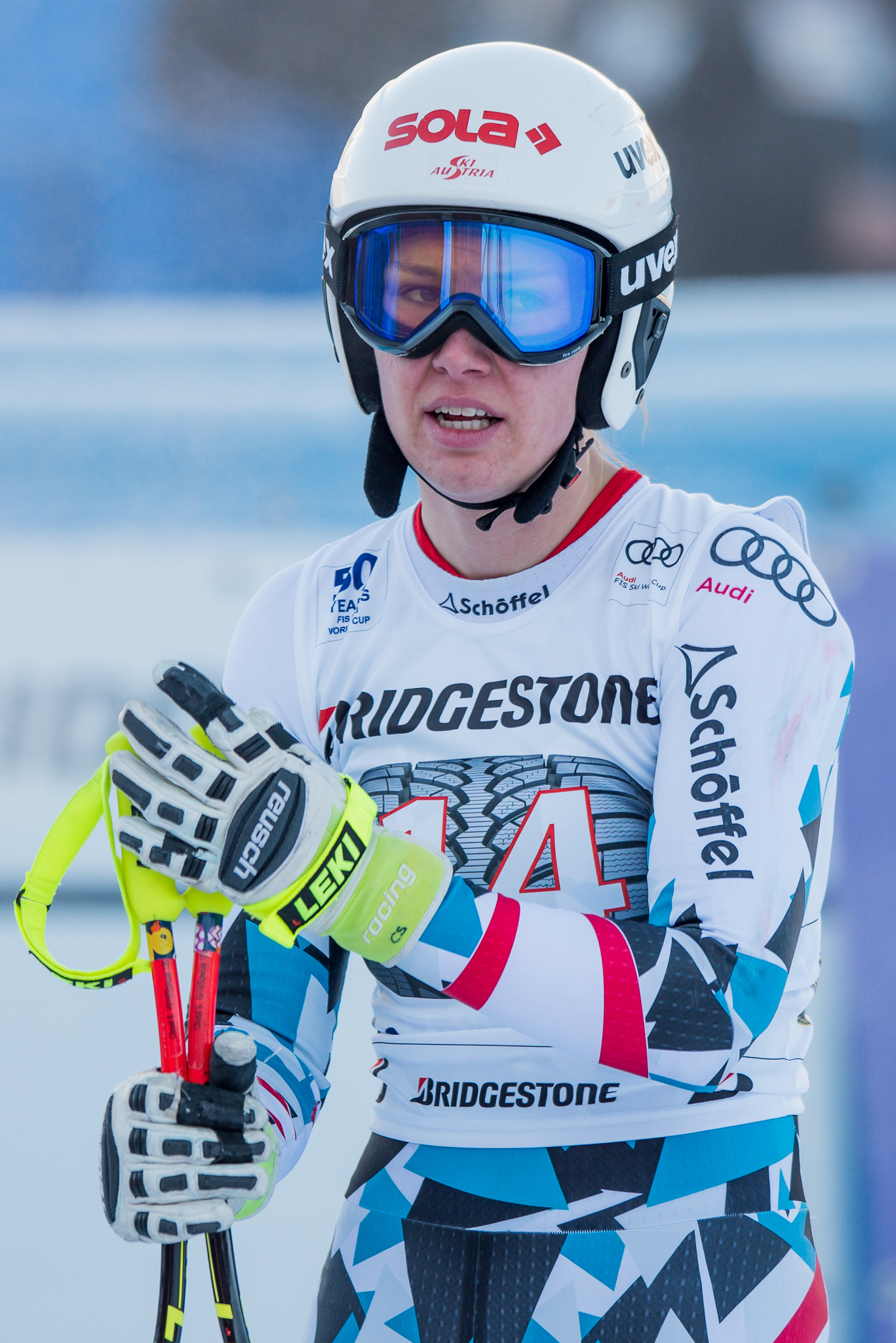
- Scheyer in 2017

Personal information
- Born: 18 July 1994 (age 32) Hohenems, Vorarlberg, Austria

Skiing career
- Sport: Alpine skiing ♀
- Club: B-Kader
- Disciplines: Downhill, Super-G, Combined
- World Cup debut: 12 December 2014 (age 20)

Olympics
- Teams: 1 – (2022)
- Medals: 0

World Championships
- Teams: 2 – (2017, 2021)
- Medals: 0

World Cup
- Seasons: 9 – (2015–2023)
- Wins: 1 – (1 DH)
- Podiums: 2 – (2 DH)
- Overall titles: 0 – (25th in 2017)
- Discipline titles: 0 – (10th in DH, 2017, 2022)

Christine Scheyer (born 18 July 1994) is a World Cup alpine ski racer from Austria. Born in Hohenems, Vorarlberg, she specializes in the speed events of downhill and super-G, and also the combined. Scheyer made her World Cup debut in December 2014 and achieved her first podium in January 2017, a win in the downhill at Altenmarkt-Zauchensee.

She competed at the 2022 Winter Olympics, and was sixth in the combined.

== World Cup results ==
=== Season standings ===
Season	Age	Overall	Slalom	Giant slalom	Super-G	Downhill	Combined
2016	21	111	—	—	—	—	41
2017	22	25	—	—	14	10	26
2018	23	54	—	—	24	29	26
2019	24	75	—	—	—	30	—
2020	25	92	—	—	56	35	—
2021	26	58	—	—	12	27	—N/a
2022	27	31	—	—	32	10	—N/a

=== Race podiums ===
- 1 win – (1 DH)
- 2 podiums – (2 DH); 13 top tens (8 DH, 5 SG)

Season	Date	Location	Discipline	Place
2017	15 January 2017	Altenmarkt, Austria	Downhill	1st
2022	16 March 2022	Courchevel, France	Downhill	2nd

== World Championship results ==
Year	Age	Slalom	Giant slalom	Super-G	Downhill	Combined
2017	22	—	—	15	6	13
2021	26	—	—	17	19	—

== Olympic results ==
Year	Age	Slalom	Giant slalom	Super-G	Downhill	Combined
2022	27	—	—	—	—	6
