= Tsubaki Miki =

Japanese snowboarder (born 2003)

Personal information
- Born: 1 June 2003 (age 23) Hakuba, Nagano, Japan

Sport
- Country: Japan
- Sport: Snowboarding
- Event(s): Parallel slalom, Parallel giant slalom
Medal record
Women's snowboarding
Representing Japan
World Championships
Gold medal – first place	2023 Bakuriani	Parallel giant slalom
Gold medal – first place	2025 Engadin	Parallel slalom
Silver medal – second place	2025 Engadin	Parallel giant slalom
Junior World Championships
Gold medal – first place	2022 Valmalenco	Parallel slalom
Gold medal – first place	2022 Valmalenco	Parallel giant slalom
Gold medal – first place	2022 Valmalenco	Parallel team
Gold medal – first place	2023 Bansko	Parallel giant slalom
Silver medal – second place	2019 Rogla	Parallel slalom
Silver medal – second place	2020 Lachtal	Parallel slalom
Silver medal – second place	2020 Lachtal	Parallel giant slalom
Silver medal – second place	2020 Lachtal	Parallel team
Silver medal – second place	2021 Krasnoyarsk	Parallel giant slalom
Silver medal – second place	2021 Krasnoyarsk	Parallel team

Tsubaki Miki (三木 つばき, Miki Tsubaki; born 1 June 2003) is a Japanese snowboarder. She represented Japan at the 2022 Winter Olympics.

== Career ==
Miki is a four-time silver medalist at the FIS Snowboarding Junior World Championships, winning two in parallel slalom in 2019 and 2020 and two in parallel giant slalom 2020 and 2021. She made her senior debut at the 2021 FIS Snowboarding Championships, where she finished in 11th in the parallel slalom, and 20th in the parallel giant slalom.

She competed at the FIS Snowboard World Championships in 2023 and won a gold medal in the parallel giant slalom event. She again competed at the FIS Snowboard World Championships in 2025 and won a silver medal in the parallel giant slalom event
