= Ester Ledecká =

Czech snowboarder and skier (born 1995)

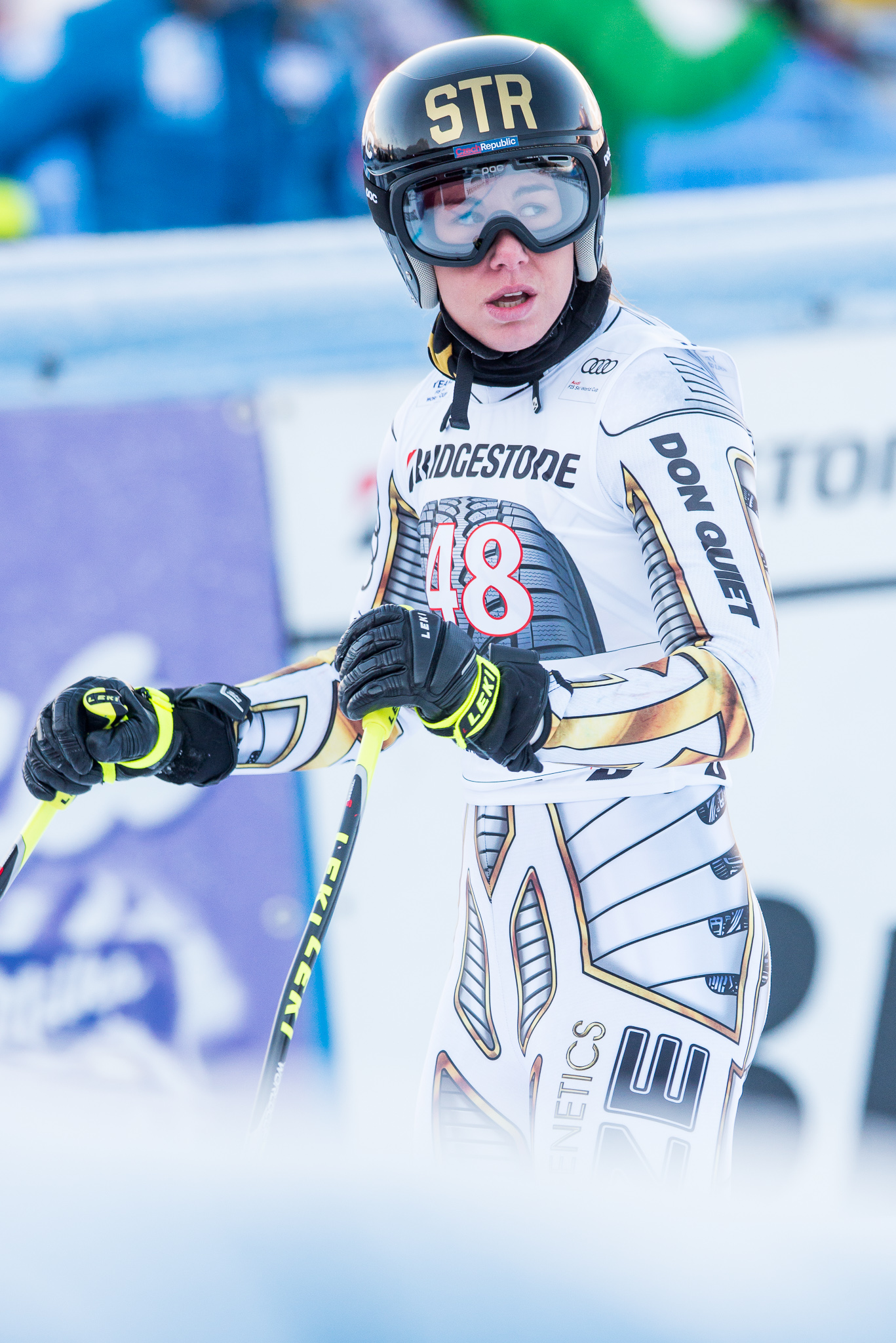
- Ledecká in 2017

Personal information
- Born: 23 March 1995 (age 31) Prague, Czech Republic
- Height: 173 cm (5 ft 8 in)
- Weight: 68 kg (150 lb)

Sport
- Country: Czech Republic
- Sport: Snowboarding; Alpine skiing
- Events: Parallel slalom, parallel giant slalom Downhill, super-G, combined
- Club: Dukla Liberec
- Coached by: Justin Reiter (snowboard); Tomáš Bank, Ondřej Bank (ski)

Achievements and titles
- Olympic finals: Gold medal in Parallel giant slalom at Pyeongchang 2018; Gold medal in Super-G at Pyeongchang 2018; Gold medal in Parallel giant slalom at Beijing 2022
- World finals: Gold medal in parallel slalom at Kreischberg 2015; Gold medal in parallel giant slalom at Sierra Nevada 2017; Gold medal in parallel giant slalom at Engadin 2025; Silver medal in parallel slalom at Sierra Nevada 2017; Silver medal in parallel slalom at Engadin 2025; Bronze medal in downhill at 2025 Saalbach
- Highest world ranking: 1st in Parallel World Cup (2016–2019); 1st in Parallel giant slalom World Cup (2016, 2018, 2019); • 2nd in Ski Downhill World Cup (2020); • 3rd in Alpine Combined World Cup (2020)
Medal record
Representing Czech Republic
Women's snowboarding
International snowboarding competitions
Event	1st	2nd	3rd
Olympic Games	2	0	0
World Championships	3	2	0
Junior World Championships	2	0	0
Total	7	2	0
Olympic Games
Gold medal – first place	2018 Pyeongchang	Parallel giant slalom
Gold medal – first place	2022 Beijing	Parallel giant slalom
World Championships
Gold medal – first place	2015 Kreischberg	Parallel slalom
Gold medal – first place	2017 Sierra Nevada	Parallel giant slalom
Gold medal – first place	2025 Engadin	Parallel giant slalom
Silver medal – second place	2017 Sierra Nevada	Parallel slalom
Silver medal – second place	2025 Engadin	Parallel slalom
Junior World Championships
Gold medal – first place	2013 Erzurum	Parallel slalom
Gold medal – first place	2013 Erzurum	Parallel giant slalom
European Youth Olympic Festival
Gold medal – first place	2011 Liberec	Parallel giant slalom
Women's alpine skiing
International alpine skiing competitions
Event	1st	2nd	3rd
Olympic Games	1	0	0
World Championships	0	0	1
Total	1	0	1
Olympic Games
Gold medal – first place	2018 Pyeongchang	Super-G
World Championships
Bronze medal – third place	2025 Saalbach	Downhill

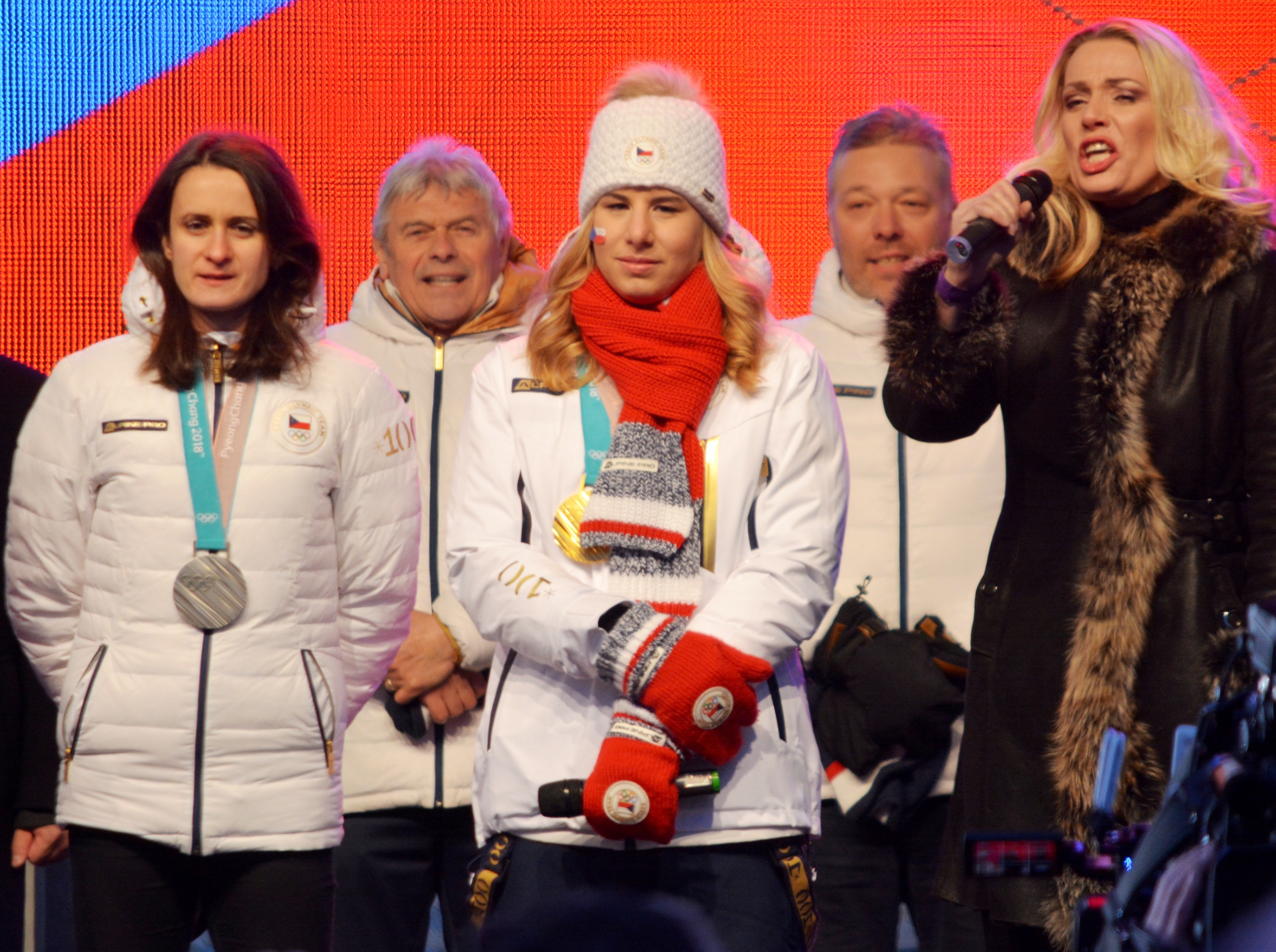
Ledecká with Martina Sáblíková (left) at Old Town Square in Prague after returning from the 2018 Winter Olympics

Ester Ledecká (Czech pronunciation: [ˈɛstɛr ˈlɛdɛtskaː], born 23 March 1995) is a Czech snowboarder and alpine skier. At the 2018 Winter Olympics in Pyeongchang, Ledecká won gold medals in the super-G in alpine skiing and in the parallel giant slalom in snowboarding, becoming the first person to not only compete in the Winter Olympics using two different types of equipment (skis and snowboard) but to go further and win two gold medals and do so at the same Winter Olympics. She was the second woman to win an Olympic gold in two separate disciplines but the first to do so at the same Winter Olympics. She was the first Czech to win the parallel giant slalom in snowboarding at the FIS Snowboard World Cup.

== Early life ==
Ester Ledecká was born in Prague, to mother Zuzana, a figure skater, and father Janek Ledecký, a well-known musician in the Czech Republic and Slovakia. She comes from a sporting family: her maternal grandfather is a former ice hockey player Jan Klapáč, who was a seven-time World Championship and two-time Olympic medallist. In 2014, she was still at high school, attending a distance-learning programme in Prague.

Ice hockey was the first sport she took up as a child, before taking up skiing at the age of four and later adding snowboarding. "I was following what my brother did," Ledecká says. "He is one and a half years older than me, and so when he started with a board, I wanted to do it too. I was five years old when I started snowboarding, and I did freestyle snowboarding and boardercross until I was about thirteen years old. And again, it was my brother who started with alpine snowboarding, and I wanted to beat him, so I learned that too."

Her hobbies include playing the guitar and singing. She also enjoys participating in summer sports such as beach volleyball and windsurfing.

== Career ==
Ledecká competed in her first World Cup tournament in the 2012–13 competition, finishing in 13th place in the parallel giant slalom event. In March 2013, at the age of 17, she won gold in the parallel slalom event at the Junior World Championships, her second gold of the competition. She was named "Junior Sportsperson of the year" at the Czech Republic's 2013 Sportsperson of the Year awards.

During the 2013–14 FIS Snowboard World Cup, Ledecká placed second behind Patrizia Kummer in the first parallel slalom event in Bad Gastein and third in the second event. She subsequently won gold at Rogla in the parallel giant slalom event at the same competition, becoming the first Czech to do so. In doing so, she also became just the third Czech to win any World Cup snowboarding event.

Ahead of the 2014 Winter Olympics, The Daily Telegraph's Andrew Lawton mentioned Ledecká as the "one to watch" in the women's snowboarding competition. She was among the Czech athletes most expected to win a medal at the games, along with Martina Sáblíková, Gabriela Soukalová and fellow snowboarder Eva Samková. After she had finished ninth in qualifying for the alpine skiing event at the Winter Olympics, the Czech Ski Association attempted to register her as a competitor. However, the FIS rejected the proposal, reiterating that only eight Czechs could compete.

Ledecká made her Olympic debut at the 2014 Winter Olympics on 19 February 2014 in the parallel giant slalom snowboarding event. She reached the quarter-final stage before being eliminated by Patrizia Kummer, who went on to win the gold medal in the event. Ledecká was classified as seventh overall.

Ledecká has combined her snowboarding career with competing in alpine skiing: she made her debut on the FIS Alpine Ski World Cup in February 2016, finishing 24th in her first race, the Kandahar downhill in Garmisch. She went on to score points in four of her first five World Cup races, competing in the downhill and Super-G disciplines. In 2017 she became the first sportsperson to compete in World Championships in both skiing and snowboarding, taking a gold in the parallel giant slalom and a silver in the parallel slalom at the Freestyle Ski and Snowboarding World Championships in Sierra Nevada, Spain, and scoring top 30 finishes in the downhill, super-G and alpine combined at the Alpine Skiing World Championships in St. Moritz, Switzerland.

Ledecká made her Olympic debut in alpine skiing at the 2018 Winter Olympics while also being qualified for alpine snowboarding. She won the gold medal in super-G in alpine skiing at the 2018 Winter Olympics in a historic upset. She was visibly shocked after finishing 0.01 seconds ahead of the 2014 Olympics defending gold medalist Anna Veith, who had already been proclaimed the winner by many media outlets. Ledecká was ranked 49th in the event before the Olympics and had never medalled in any World Cup level international skiing event. To make the feat even more surprising to reporters, she was rumored to be allegedly racing on skis borrowed from Mikaela Shiffrin (both racers are sponsored by Atomic). She refused to remove her goggles for the post-victory press conference, insisting that this is her trademark (which is true), and when pressed by reporters, she stated that she had skipped wearing makeup as she had not expected to win the event. Her snowboard coach, American Justin Reiter, arrived at the start of the Ladies PGS event with his reversible Czech team jacket confidently already turned gold side out. After victory in the parallel giant slalom she became the first ever female athlete to win an Olympic gold medal in two different disciplines during the same Winter Olympics (Anfisa Reztsova had previously won gold in different disciplines but not at the same Olympics, nor using completely different equipment: cross country skiing in 1988 and biathlon in 1992 and 1994). Ledecká was chosen as the flag bearer for the Czech Republic at the closing ceremony.

In the 2018–19 Alpine Ski World Cup, Ledecká finished 24th in the downhill standings and 28th in super-G. In December 2019, Ledecká scored her first win on the Alpine Ski World Cup in downhill at Lake Louise, eclipsing her previous personal best World Cup downhill result of seventh at the same venue two years previously. In December 2020, she won her first World Cup Super-G race.

Ledecká continued to split her time between snowboarding and Alpine skiing, finishing second in World Cup Alpine skiing in the downhill for the 2020 season and third for the 2022 season, as well as third in the combined in 2020, the last season it has been contested due to the COVID-19 pandemic. In the 2022 Winter Olympics, Ledecká repeated as the snowboarding gold medalist in parallel giant slalom, while in Alpine skiing she finished fifth in super-G and fourth in combined. However, she was injured while training during the summer of 2022 and targeted a possible return during February 2023. Ultimately, she was unable to return for the Alpine skiing world championships in February but made it back for the final snowboarding races in March at Berchtesgaden, where she won the women's parallel slalom for her only win of the season.

On Thursday March 20, 2025, Ledecká made history as she claimed her third World Championship gold in the parallel giant slalom at St. Moritz, becoming the first athlete in the world to win two FIS World Championship medals in the same season, in two different disciplines.

== World Cup results ==
All results are sourced from the International Ski Federation (FIS).

=== Snowboarding ===
==== Season titles ====
- 7 titles – (4 parallel overall, 3 parallel giant slalom)

Season	Discipline
2016	Parallel overall
2016	Parallel giant slalom
2017	Parallel overall
2018	Parallel overall
2018	Parallel giant slalom
2019	Parallel overall
2019	Parallel giant slalom

==== Season standings ====
Season	Age	Parallel overall	Parallel slalom	Parallel giant slalom
2013	17	15	16	15
2014	18	2	2	3
2015	19	3	8	2
2016	20	1	5	1
2017	21	1	2	3
2018	22	1	24	1
2019	23	1	13	1
2020	24	17	8	17
2021	25	23	—	13
2022	26	15	—	12
2023	27	18	15	20
2024	28	13	3	—
2025	29	24	20	26
2026	30	23	—	22

Standings through 31 January 2026

==== Race podiums ====
- 26 wins – (20 PGS, 6 PSL)
- 40 podiums – (29 PGS, 11 PSL)

Season	Date	Location	Discipline	Place
2013–14	10 January 2014	Bad Gastein, Austria	Parallel slalom	2nd
2013–14	12 January 2014	Bad Gastein, Austria	Parallel slalom	3rd
2013–14	18 January 2014	Rogla, Slovenia	Parallel giant slalom	1st
2014–15	9 January 2015	Bad Gastein, Austria	Parallel slalom	1st
2014–15	7 February 2015	Sudelfeld, Germany	Parallel giant slalom	1st
2014–15	28 February 2015	Asahikawa, Japan	Parallel giant slalom	3rd
2015–16	12 December 2015	Carezza, Italy	Parallel giant slalom	1st
2015–16	23 January 2016	Rogla, Slovenia	Parallel giant slalom	1st
2015–16	30 January 2016	Moscow, Russia	Parallel slalom	3rd
2015–16	27 February 2016	Kayseri, Turkey	Parallel giant slalom	1st
2016–17	15 December 2016	Carezza, Italy	Parallel giant slalom	2nd
2016–17	17 December 2016	Cortina d'Ampezzo, Italy	Parallel slalom	1st
2016–17	28 January 2017	Rogla, Slovenia	Parallel giant slalom	1st
2016–17	5 March 2017	Kayseri, Turkey	Parallel giant slalom	1st
2016–17	18 March 2017	Winterberg, Germany	Parallel slalom	2nd
2017–18	14 December 2017	Carezza, Italy	Parallel giant slalom	1st
2017–18	15 December 2017	Cortina d'Ampezzo, Italy	Parallel giant slalom	1st
2017–18	5 January 2018	Lackenhof, Austria	Parallel giant slalom	1st
2017–18	20 January 2018	Rogla, Slovenia	Parallel giant slalom	1st
2017–18	26 January 2018	Bansko, Bulgaria	Parallel giant slalom	1st
2017–18	3 March 2018	Kayseri, Turkey	Parallel giant slalom	2nd
2017–18	10 March 2018	Scuol, Switzerland	Parallel giant slalom	1st
2018–19	13 December 2018	Carezza, Italy	Parallel giant slalom	2nd
2018–19	15 December 2018	Cortina d'Ampezzo, Italy	Parallel giant slalom	1st
2018–19	16 February 2019	Pyeongchang, South Korea	Parallel giant slalom	1st
2018–19	17 February 2019	Pyeongchang, South Korea	Parallel giant slalom	3rd
2018–19	23 February 2019	Secret Garden, China	Parallel giant slalom	2nd
2018–19	9 March 2019	Scuol, Switzerland	Parallel giant slalom	2nd
2019–20	14 January 2020	Bad Gastein, Austria	Parallel slalom	2nd
2019–20	18 January 2020	Rogla, Slovenia	Parallel giant slalom	1st
2020–21	12 December 2020	Cortina d'Ampezzo, Italy	Parallel giant slalom	1st
2021–22	16 December 2021	Carezza, Italy	Parallel giant slalom	2nd
2021–22	18 December 2021	Cortina d'Ampezzo, Italy	Parallel giant slalom	1st
2022–23	15 March 2023	Rogla, Slovenia	Parallel giant slalom	2nd
2022–23	18 March 2023	Berchtesgaden, Germany	Parallel slalom	1st
2023–24	20 January 2024	Pamporovo, Bulgaria	Parallel slalom	1st
2023–24	21 January 2024	Pamporovo, Bulgaria	Parallel slalom	1st
2023–24	9 March 2024	Winterberg, Germany	Parallel slalom	1st
2024–25	30 November 2024	Mylin, China	Parallel giant slalom	1st
2025–26	23 January 2026	Simonhöhe, Austria	Parallel giant slalom	1st

=== Alpine skiing ===
==== Season standings ====
Season	Age	Overall	Super-G	Downhill	Combined
2016	20	93	42	37	—
2017	21	77	38	34	—
2018	22	61	47	22	—
2019	23	54	28	24	—
2020	24	10	21	2	3
2021	25	13	5	8	—N/a
2022	26	17	23	3	—N/a
2023	27	injured, did not compete in alpine skiing			—N/a
2024	28	23	6	23	—N/a
2025	29	21	16	8	—N/a
2026	30	17	5	14	—N/a

Standings through 25 March 2026

==== Race podiums ====
- 4 wins (2 DH, 2 SG)
- 12 podiums (7 DH, 4 SG, 1 AC), 49 top tens

Season	Date	Location	Discipline	Place
2019–20	6 December 2019	Lake Louise, Canada	Downhill	1st
2019–20	8 February 2020	Garmisch-Partenkirchen, Germany	Downhill	3rd
2019–20	23 February 2020	Crans-Montana, Switzerland	Combined	3rd
2020–21	20 December 2020	Val-d'Isère, France	Super G	1st
2020–21	22 January 2021	Crans-Montana, Switzerland	Downhill	2nd
2021–22	22 January 2022	Cortina d'Ampezzo, Italy	Downhill	3rd
2021–22	26 February 2022	Crans-Montana, Switzerland	Downhill	1st
2021–22	27 February 2022	Crans-Montana, Switzerland	Downhill	2nd
2023–24	3 March 2024	Kvitfjell, Norway	Super G	3rd
2023–24	22 March 2024	Saalbach, Austria	Super G	1st
2024–25	11 January 2025	St. Anton, Austria	Downhill	3rd
2025–26	18 January 2026	Tarvisio, Italy	Super G	3rd

== Olympic results ==
- 3 medals – (3 golds)

=== Snowboarding ===
- 2 medals – (2 golds)

Year	Age	Parallel slalom	Parallel giant slalom
(Russia) 2014 Sochi	18	6	7
(South Korea) 2018 Pyeongchang	22	—N/a	1
(China) 2022 Beijing	26	—N/a	1
(Italy) 2026 Milano Cortina	30	—N/a	5

=== Alpine skiing ===
- 1 medal – (1 gold)

Year	Age	Giant slalom	Super-G	Downhill	Combined
(South Korea) 2018 Pyeongchang	22	23	1	—	—
(China) 2022 Beijing	26	—	5	27	4
(Italy) 2026 Milano Cortina	30	—	DNF	—	—N/a

== World Championships results ==
- 6 medals – (3 gold, 2 silver, 1 bronze)

=== Snowboarding ===
- 5 medals – (3 gold, 2 silver)

Year	Age	Parallel slalom	Parallel giant slalom
(Spain) 2011 La Molina	15	40	33
(Canada) 2013 Stoneham	17	17	16
(Austria) 2015 Kreischberg	19	1	5
(Spain) 2017 Sierra Nevada	21	2	1
(Switzerland) 2025 Engadin	29	2	1

=== Alpine skiing ===
- 1 medal – (1 bronze)

Year	Age	Downhill	Super-G	Giant slalom	Slalom	Combined
(Switzerland) 2017 St. Moritz	21	21	29	37	—	20
(Sweden) 2019 Åre	23	17	27	—	—	15
(Italy) 2021 Cortina	25	4	4	—	—	8
(Austria) 2025 Saalbach	29	3	7	—	—	—

== See also ==
- Czech Republic at the 2014 Winter Olympics
- Czech Republic at the 2018 Winter Olympics
- Dual sport and multi-sport Olympians
- List of multi-sport athletes - Snowboarding
- List of multi-sport champions
- List of multiple Olympic gold medalists in one event

Awards
Preceded by Karolína Erbanová	Czech Junior Athlete of the Year; 2013; 2015 (with Jiří Janošek)	Succeeded by Anežka Drahotová
Preceded by Gabriela Koukalová; Lukáš Krpálek; Josef Dostál	Czech Athlete of the Year; 2018; 2022; 2025	Succeeded by Lukáš Krpálek; Markéta Vondroušová
