= Nathalie Eklund (alpine skier) =

Swedish alpine skier (born 1992)

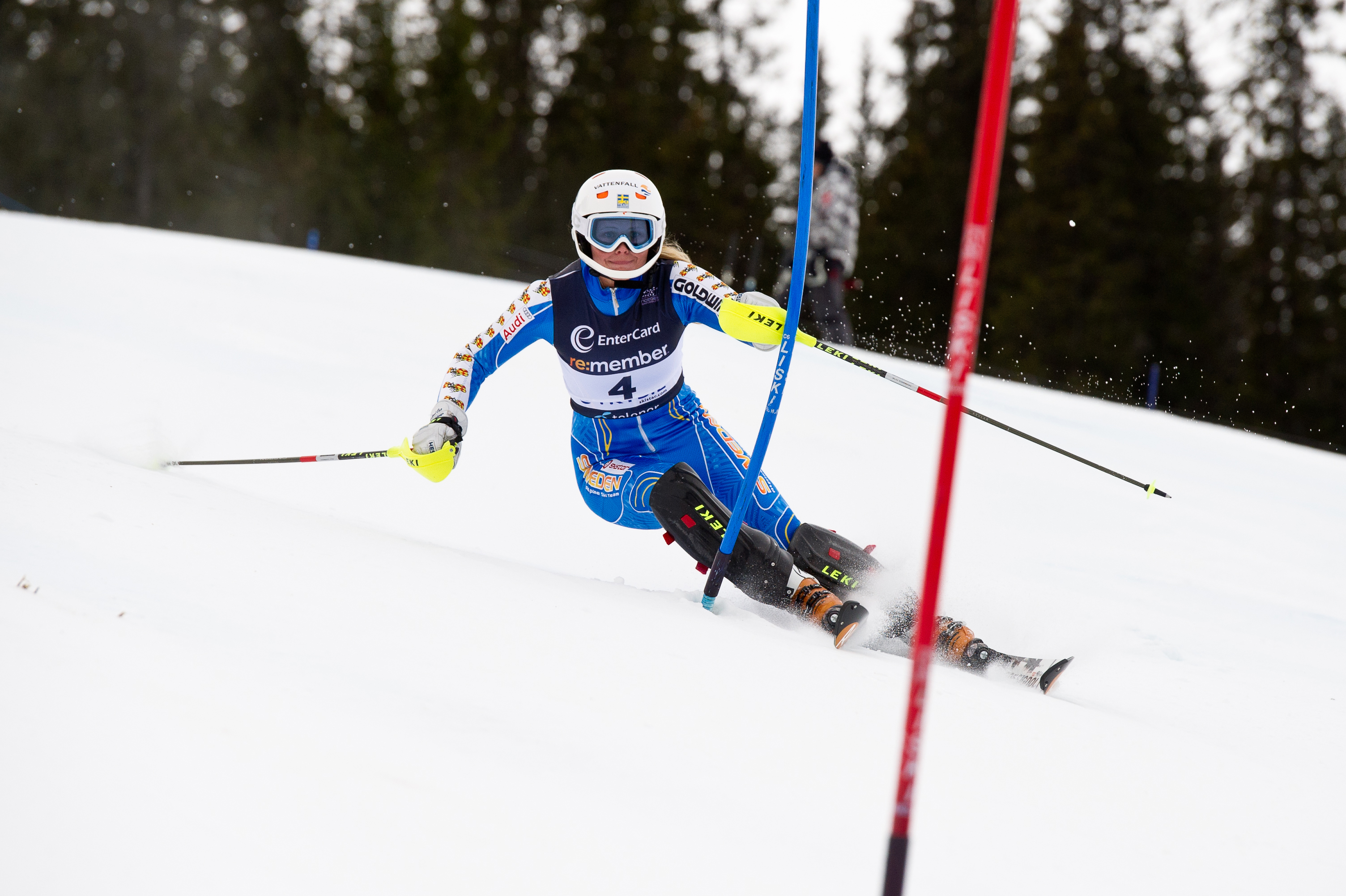
Nathalie Eklund - NM i Trysil

Nathalie Eklund (born 8 January 1992) is a retired Swedish alpine skier.

Competing at the Junior World Championships in 2009, 2010, 2011, 2012 and 2013, her biggest success came at the 2013 edition with a 5th place in slalom.

She made her FIS Alpine Ski World Cup debut in November 2010 in Levi, being disqualified. She collected her first World Cup points with a 24th place in January 2011 in Flachau, and improved to an 11th place in March 2012 in Åre. She managed a 6th place in December 2012 in Åre, in addition to two further top-10 placements in January 2013. She finished 16th in slalom at the 2013 World Championships. Her last World Cup outing came in January 2018 in Flachau, where she was disqualified.

She represented the sports club Leksands SLK.
