= Elia Zurbriggen =

Swiss alpine skier

Personal information
- Born: 9 October 1990 (age 35)

Skiing career
- Sport: Alpine skiing

Elia Zurbriggen (born 9 October 1990) is a Swiss former alpine ski racer. He is the son of former World Cup winner, World and Olympic champion Pirmin Zurbriggen and nephew of fellow alpine skier Heidi Zurbriggen.

He competed at the 2015 World Championships in Beaver Creek, USA, in the giant slalom.
