= Anna Hofer =

Italian alpine skier

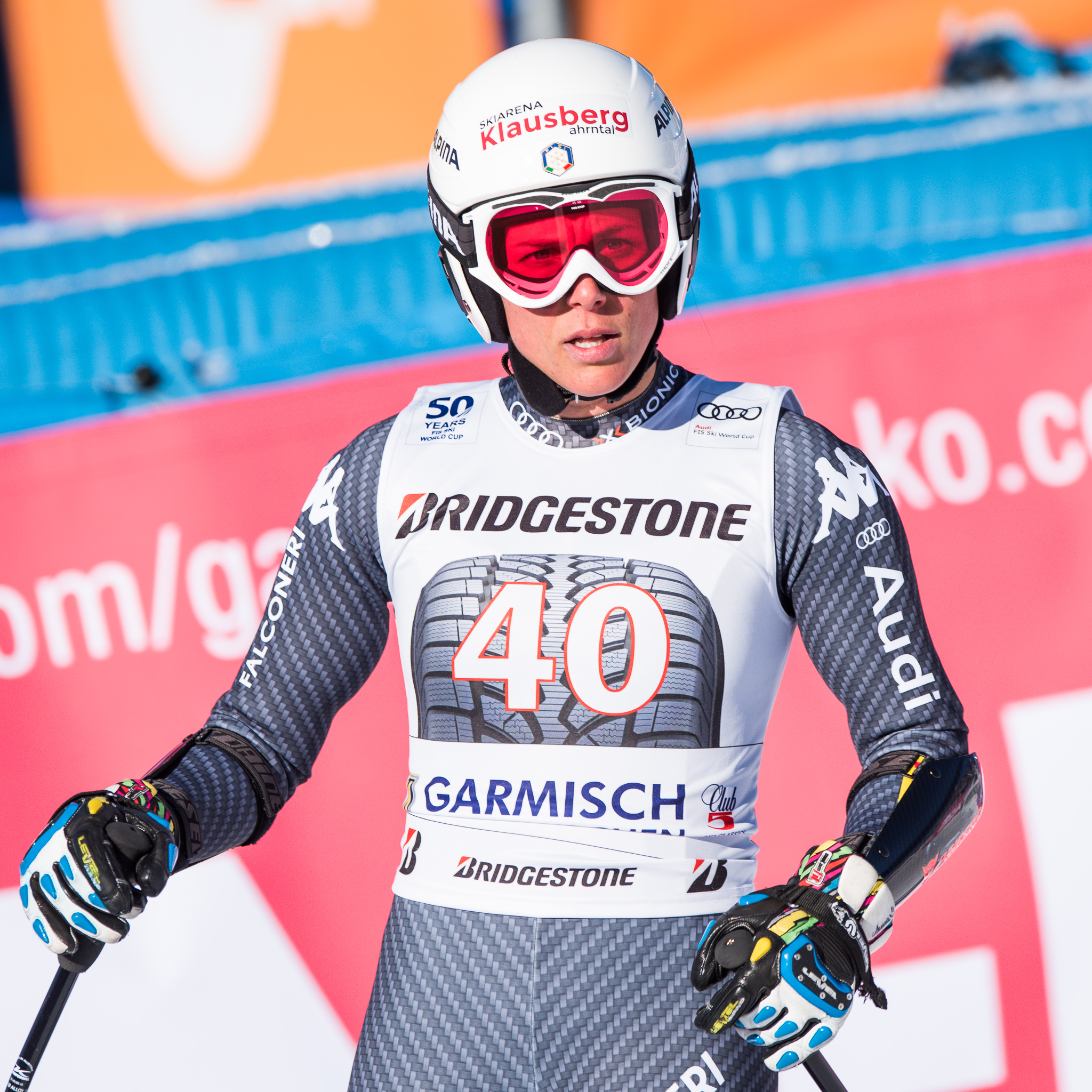
Anna Hofer, 2017.

Anna Hofer (born 28 February 1988) is a retired Italian alpine skier.

She competed at the 2005 European Youth Olympic Winter Festival and the 2006 Junior World Championships, 2007 and 2008 Junior World Championships without breaking into the top 10.

She made her FIS Alpine Ski World Cup debut in January 2011 in Cortina d'Ampezzo, collecting her first World Cup points in her next race, a 16th place in giant slalom in Arber-Zwiesel. Following several meagre years, she experienced a minor breakthrough in December 2017, recording 21st and 10th places in Val d'Isère and a 20th place in Bad Kleinkirchheim in January 2018. However, after reverting to several placements in the 30s and 40s rank she collected her final World Cup points in December 2019 in Val Gardena, finishing 27th in the super-G.

She represented the sports club GS Fiamme Oro.
