= Sabrina Maier =

Austrian alpine skier

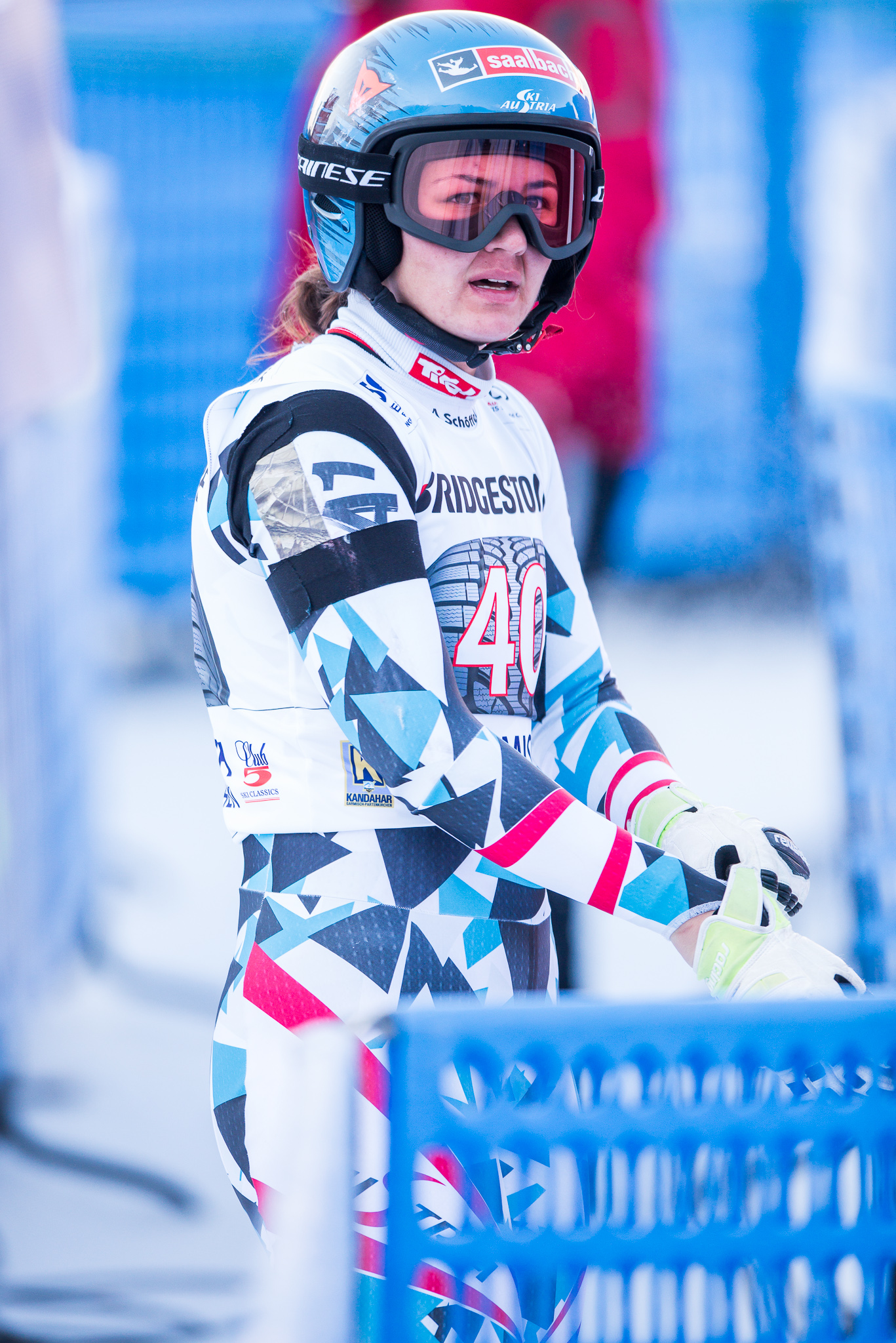
- Sabrina Maier (2017)

Personal information
- Born: 4 October 1994 (age 31) Austria

Skiing career
- Sport: Alpine skiing
- Club: SC Saalbach Hinterglemm, Salzburg, Austria
- Disciplines: Downhill, Super-G
World Cup debut
4 December 2015 (age 21)

World Cup
- Seasons: 1st – (2016)
- Wins: 0
- Podiums: 0
- Overall titles: 0
- Discipline titles: 0
Medal record
Women's alpine skiing
Representing Austria
European Youth Olympic Festival
Bronze medal – third place	2011 Liberec	Giant Slalom
Bronze medal – third place	2011 Liberec	Slalom

Sabrina Maier (born 4 October 1994) is an Austrian alpine ski racer. Maier specializes in the speed events of Downhill and Super-G. Maier made her World Cup debut on 4 December 2015.

== Career ==
In February 2011 she competed for Austria at the 2011 European Youth Olympic Winter Festival, she won the bronze medal in the Giant Slalom and Slalom. On 4 December 2015, Maier made her World Cup debut in Downhill at Lake Louise, Canada. On 18 December 2015 she scored her first World Cup points finishing 23rd in the Alpine combined at Val-d'Isère, France.

== World Cup results ==
Season	Age	Overall	Slalom	Giant slalom	Super-G	Downhill	Combined
2016	21	81	—	—	37	34	31
