= Gian Luca Barandun =

Swiss alpine skier

Gian Luca Barundun (June 28, 1994 – November 4, 2018) was a Swiss downhill and alpine combined skier who represented his nation on the World Cup Skiing circuit.

== Biography ==
Barandun had skied in eight World Cup events for Switzerland. His best finish on the World Cup circuit was ninth place in Bormio during December 2017. He was considered to have been one of Switzerland's most promising competitive downhill skiers.

== Death ==
Barandun died in a paragliding accident on November 4, 2018. He was 24.
