= Nils Mani =

Swiss alpine skier (born 1992)

Personal information
- Born: 23 May 1992 (age 34) Switzerland
- Height: 182 cm (6 ft 0 in)

Skiing career
- Sport: Alpine skiing
- Club: SC Schwenden
- Retired: 25 January 2022 (age 29)
- Disciplines: Downhill, Super-G, Alpine Combined
- World Cup debut: 15 December 2012 (age 20)

World Cup
- Seasons: 4th – (2013–16)
- Wins: 0
- Podiums: 0
- Overall titles: 0 – (113th in 2016)
- Discipline titles: 0 – (24th in AC, 2016)
Medal record
Men's alpine skiing
Representing Switzerland
World Junior Ski Championships
| Gold medal – first place | 2013 Québec | Downhill |
| Silver medal – second place | 2012 Roccaraso | Super-G |
| Silver medal – second place | 2013 Québec | Super-G |
| Bronze medal – third place | 2012 Roccaraso | Downhill |

Nils Mani (born 23 May 1992) is a Swiss former alpine ski racer. Mani specialized in the speed events of Downhill and Super-G. Mani made his World Cup debut on 15 December 2012 in Val Gardena, Italy finishing in 40th place.

== Career ==
Mani competed for Switzerland at the 2011 Alpine Skiing Junior World Championships in Crans-Montana, Switzerland. He finished 33rd in the giant slalom, 20th in the slalom, 8th in the combined, 6th in the downhill, and 11th in the Super-G. He competed for Switzerland at the 2012 Alpine Skiing Junior World Championships in Roccaraso, Italy. He won the bronze medal in the Downhill, silver medal in the Super-G and finished 11th in the giant slalom. On 15 December 2012 he made his World Cup debut in the Val Gardena Downhill, he finished 40th. He scored his first World Cup points on 29 December 2012 in the Bormio Downhill, finishing in 27th. He competed for Switzerland at the 2013 Alpine Skiing Junior World Championships in Québec, Canada. He won the gold medal in the Downhill, silver medal in the Super-G, finished 13th in the giant slalom and failed to finish in the slalom. On 17 December 2016 he achieved his first World Cup Top 10 result, finishing in 9th place at the Val Gardena Downhill. He competed for Switzerland at the FIS Alpine World Ski Championships 2017 in St. Moritz, Switzerland. He finished 23rd in the Downhill.

== World Cup results ==
=== Season standings ===
Season
| Season | Age | Overall | Slalom | Giant; Slalom | Super G | Downhill | Combined |
| 2013 | 20 | 139 | — | — | — | 53 | — |
| 2014 | 21 | 129 | — | — | — | 48 | — |
| 2015 | 22 | 151 | — | — | 60 | — | — |
| 2016 | 23 | 113 | — | — | — | 57 | 24 |
| 2017 | 24 | 79 | — | — | — | 35 | 11 |
| 2018 | 25 | 121 | — | — | — | 51 | 30 |
| 2019 | 26 | 145 | — | — | — | 54 | — |
| 2020 | 27 | 95 | — | — | — | 38 | — |

- Standings through 28 January 2018

=== Top Ten finishes ===
| Season | Date | Location | Discipline | Place |
|---|---|---|---|---|
| 2017 | 17 Dec 2016 | Val Gardena, Italy | Downhill | 9th |
| 2017 | 13 Jan 2017 | Wengen, Switzerland | Alpine Combined | 5th |

== World Championship results ==
| Year | Age | Slalom | Giant slalom | Super-G | Downhill | Combined |
|---|---|---|---|---|---|---|
| 2017 | 24 | — | — | — | 23 | — |

== Junior World Championship results ==
| Year | Age | Slalom | Giant slalom | Super-G | Downhill | Combined |
|---|---|---|---|---|---|---|
| 2011 | 18 | 20 | 33 | 11 | 6 | 8 |
| 2012 | 19 | — | 11 | 2 | 3 | — |
| 2013 | 20 | DNF1 | 13 | 2 | 1 | — |
