= World Junior Alpine Skiing Championships 2012 =

International skiing competition

The World Junior Alpine Skiing Championships 2012 were the 31st World Junior Alpine Skiing Championships, held between 29 February and 9 March 2012 in Roccaraso, Italy.

== Medal winners ==
=== Men's events ===
Event	Gold		Silver		Bronze	
Downhill	Ryan Cochran-Siegle; United States	1:11.99	Ralph Weber; Switzerland	1:12.08	Nils Mani; Switzerland	1:12.48
Super-G	Ralph Weber; Switzerland	1:02.73	Nils Mani; Switzerland	1:02.93	Johannes Strolz; Austria	1:03.30
Giant Slalom	Henrik Kristoffersen; Norway	2:39.50	Thomas Dressen; Germany	2:40.25	Žan Kranjec; Slovenia	2:40.35
Slalom	Santeri Paloniemi; Finland	1:38.44	Henrik Kristoffersen; Norway	1:39.70	Reto Schmidiger; Switzerland	1:39.93
Combined	Ryan Cochran-Siegle; United States	31.49 points	Henrik Kristoffersen; Norway	44.21	Žan Kranjec; Slovenia	60.62

=== Women's events ===
Event	Gold		Silver		Bronze	
Downhill; Canceled	N/A	N/A	N/A	N/A	N/A	N/A
Super-G	Annie Winquist; Norway	1:06.99	Joana Hählen; Switzerland	1:07.02	Ragnhild Mowinckel; Norway	1:07.04
Giant Slalom	Ragnhild Mowinckel; Norway	2:40.02	Sara Hector; Sweden	2:40.28	Adeline Baud; France	2:40.80
Slalom	Stephanie Brunner; Austria	1:41.19	Paulina Grassl; Sweden	1:42.31	Petra Vlhová; Slovakia	1:42.69
Combined	Ragnhild Mowinckel; Norway	11.66 points	Annie Winquist; Norway	31.00	Corinne Suter; Switzerland	31.03

=== Team event ===
Event	Gold	Silver	Bronze
Team event	Slovenia; Ula Hafner; Žan Kranjec; Ana Bucik; Mišel Žerak	Italy; Karoline Pichler; Giordano Ronci; Nicole Agnelli; Alex Zingerle	Switzerland; Jasmina Suter; Luca Aerni; Andrea Ellenberger; Bernhard Niederberger
