= FIS Alpine World Ski Championships 2021 – Nations team event =

Nations team event at the FIS Alpine World Ski Championships 2021
- Location: Cortina d'Ampezzo, Italy
- Date: 17 February
- Competitors: 79 from 15 nations
- Teams: 15

Medalists
gold medal	Sebastian Foss-Solevåg; Kristin Lysdahl; Kristina Riis-Johannessen; Fabian Wilkens Solheim; Thea Louise Stjernesund	Norway
silver medal	Estelle Alphand; William Hansson; Sara Hector; Kristoffer Jakobsen; Jonna Luthman; Mattias Rönngren	Sweden
bronze medal	Emma Aicher; Lena Dürr; Andrea Filser; Stefan Luitz; Alexander Schmid; Linus Straßer	Germany

Nations Team Event
- Location: Rumerlo; Cortina d'Ampezzo, Italy
- Vertical: 110 m (361 ft)
- Top elevation: 1,665 m (5,463 ft)
- Base elevation: 1,555 m (5,102 ft)

The Nations team event competition at the FIS Alpine World Ski Championships 2021 was held on 17 February 2021.

== FIS Overall Nations Cup standings ==
The participating nations were seeded according to the overall nations cup standings prior to the World Championships.

Teams marked in green participate.

Rank	Country	Points
1	Switzerland	7408
2	Austria	6659
3	Italy	4453
4	Norway	3547
5	France	3543
6	United States	2298
7	Germany	1769
8	Slovakia	1079
9	Slovenia	1038
10	Canada	787
11	Croatia	566
12	Czech Republic	538
13	Sweden	519
14	Great Britain	224
15	Russia	207
16	Poland	141
17	New Zealand	120
18	Bulgaria	83
19	Netherlands	77
20	Japan	46
21	Belgium	32
22	Greece	24
23	Finland	8

== Bracket ==
Round of 16
Canada	4
Czech Republic	0
United States	2
Russian Ski Federation	2
Norway	4
Japan	0
Italy	2
Finland	2
Germany	3
Great Britain	1
Slovenia	1
Sweden	3
Austria	4
Belgium	0

Quarterfinals
Switzerland	2
Canada	2
United States	2
Norway	2
Italy	1
Germany	3
Sweden	2
Austria	2

Semifinals
Switzerland	2
Norway	2
Germany	2
Sweden	2

Final
Norway	3
Sweden	1
Third place
Switzerland	2
Germany	2
