= Fabian Wilkens Solheim =

Norwegian alpine ski racer (born 1996)

Personal information
- Born: 10 April 1996 (age 30) Oslo, Norway

Skiing career
- Sport: Alpine skiing
- Club: IL Heming
- Disciplines: Slalom, giant slalom, combined

World Championships
- Teams: 1 – (2021)
- Medals: 1 (1 gold)
Medal record
Olympic Games
Bronze medal – third place	2022 Beijing	Team event
World Championships
Gold medal – first place	2021 Cortina d’Ampezzo	Team event

Fabian Wilkens Solheim (born 10 April 1996) is a Norwegian alpine ski racer.

At the 2017 Junior World Championships he finished twelfth in the giant slalom. He made his FIS Alpine Ski World Cup debut in December 2018 in Val d'Isere, and collected his first World Cup points in January 2019 in Adelboden with a 22nd-place finish. At the world championships 2021 he was part of the team winning gold medals in the team event.

He represents the sports club IL Heming.

== World Championship results ==
Year	Age	Slalom	Giant slalom	Super-G	Downhill	Combined	Team event
2021	24	—	—	—	—	—	1
