= Adeline Baud Mugnier =

French alpine skier (born 1992)

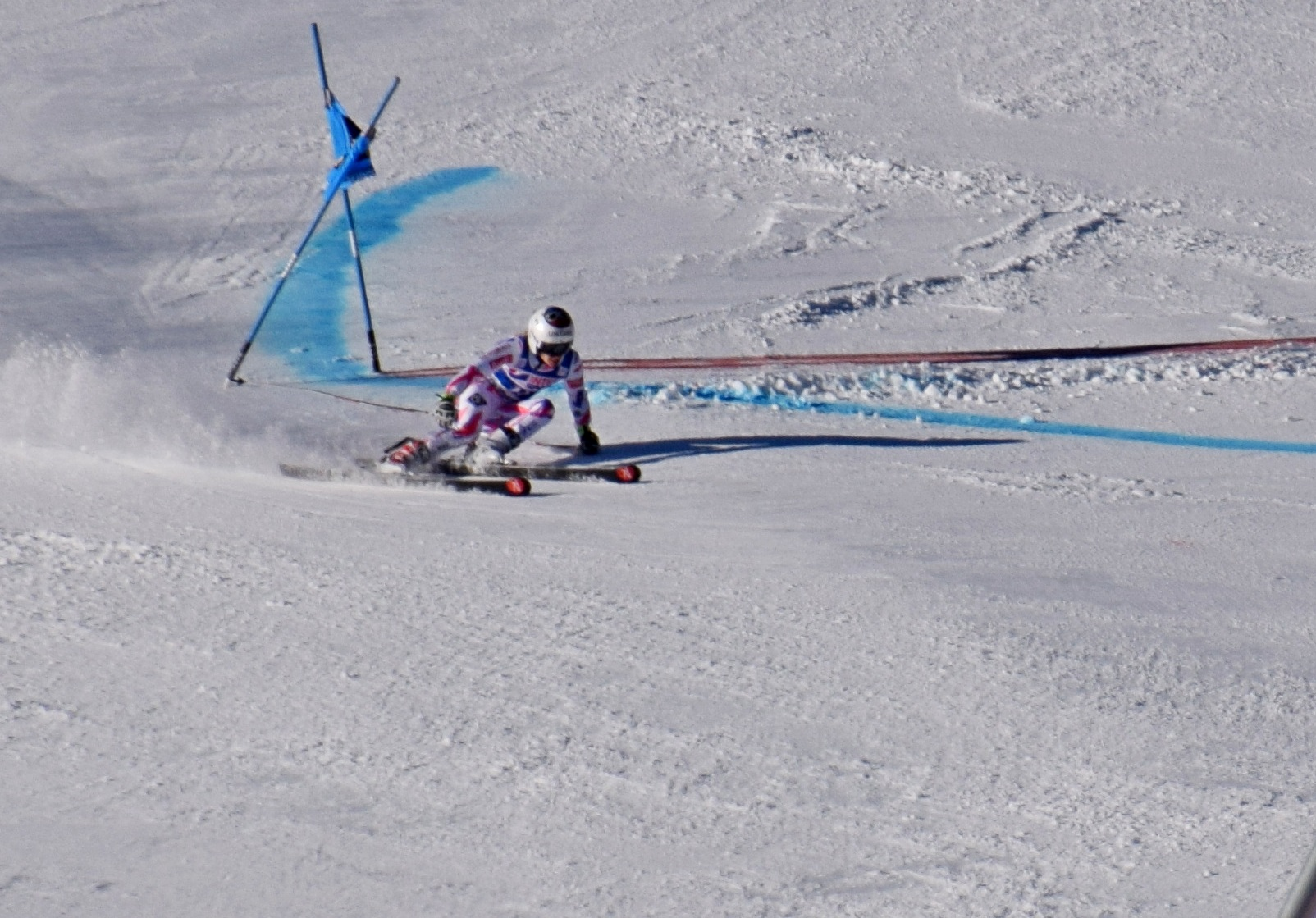
- Baud Mugnier in 2015

Personal information
- Born: Adeline Baud; 28 September 1992 (age 33) Évian-les-Bains, France
- Height: 1.62 m (5 ft 4 in)
- Weight: 56 kg (123 lb)

Sport
- Country: France
- Sport: Alpine skiing
Medal record
World Championships
Gold medal – first place	2017 St. Moritz	Team event

Adeline Baud Mugnier (born 28 September 1992) is a French alpine skier. She competed for France at the 2014 Winter Olympics in the alpine skiing events.
