= Santeri Paloniemi =

Finnish alpine skier (born 1993)

Personal information
- Born: November 8, 1993 (age 32)
- Height: 1.81 m (5 ft 11 in)

Skiing career
- Sport: Alpine skiing
- Club: Ruka Slalom
- Disciplines: Slalom, giant slalom
- World Cup debut: November 14, 2010 (age 17)

Santeri Paloniemi (born November 8, 1993) is a Finnish alpine skier.

Paloniemi's strongest event is the slalom. Before the 2014 season, he has finished in the top 30 in points in FIS Alpine Ski World Cup four times.

Paloniemi represents Ruka Slalom on club level, and is coached by his father, Martti Paloniemi.
