= Rosina Schneeberger =

Austrian alpine skier (born 1994)

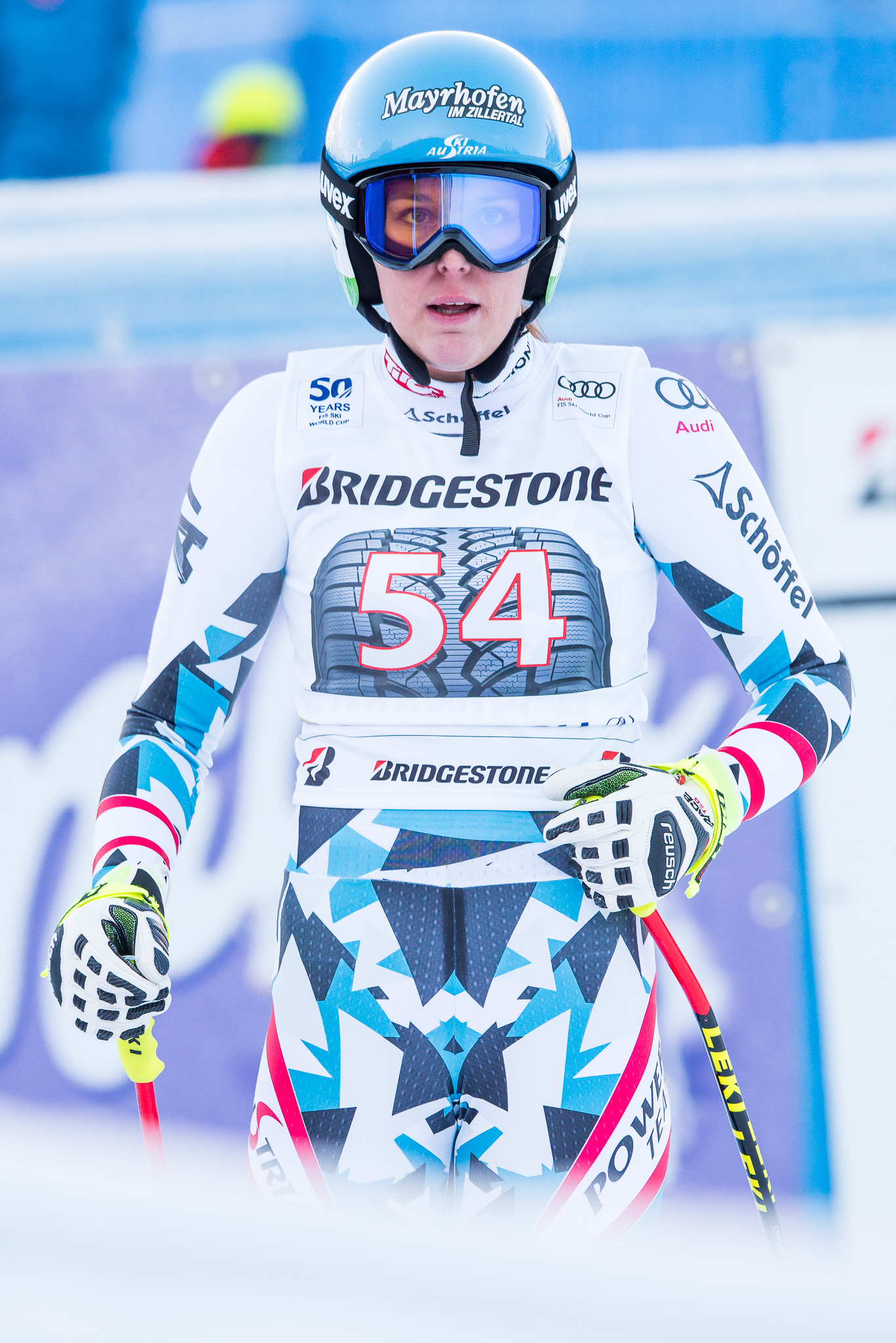
2017 Audi FIS Ski Weltcup Garmisch-Partenkirchen Damen - Rosina Schneeberger

Rosina Schneeberger (born 16 January 1994) is an Austrian alpine ski racer.
