= Kristina Riis-Johannessen =

Norwegian alpine ski racer

Personal information
- Born: 5 March 1991 (age 35) Oslo, Norway
- Height: '

Skiing career
- Sport: Alpine skiing
- Club: IF Ready
- Disciplines: Super G, giant slalom, combined

World Championships
- Teams: 2 – (2017, 2021)
- Medals: 1 (1 gold)
Medal record
World Championships
Gold medal – first place	2021 Cortina d’Ampezzo	Team event

Kristina Riis-Johannessen (born 5 March 1991) is a Norwegian former alpine ski racer. She competed in Super G, giant slalom and Combined. She competed at the 2017 World Championships in St. Moritz, Switzerland, where she placed 21st in the Super-G. Riss-Johannessen attended the University of Vermont where she was a member of the ski team and was the 2014 NCAA National Champion in the women's slalom.

She made her World Cup debut in December 2016 in Semmering, but did not finish the race, and collected her first World Cup points with a 24th place in March 2017 in Squaw Valley.

== World Championship results ==
Year	Age	Slalom	Giant slalom	Super-G	Downhill	Combined	Team event
2017	25	—	31	21	29	DNF1	—
2019	27	—	—	—	—	—	—
2021	29	—	—	—	—	—	1
