= Aleksandra Król-Walas =

Polish snowboarder (born 1990)

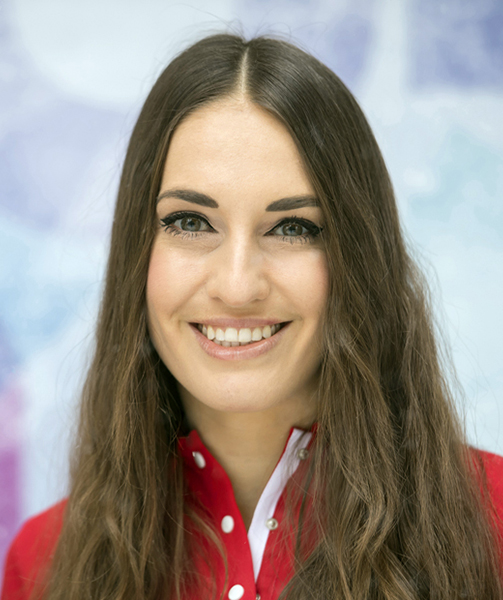
- Król in 2021

Personal information
- Born: 20 November 1990 (age 35) Zakopane, Poland

Sport
- Country: Poland
- Sport: Snowboarding
- Club: KS F2Dawidek Team.pl
Medal record
Women's snowboarding
Representing Poland
World Championships
Bronze medal – third place	2023 Bakuriani	Parallel giant slalom
Bronze medal – third place	2025 Engadin	Parallel giant slalom

Aleksandra Król-Walas (born 20 November 1990 in Zakopane) is a Polish snowboarder.

== Career ==
She competed at the FIS Snowboarding World Championships 2011 and 2013; both times in parallel giant slalom and parallel slalom. She competed at the 2014 Winter Olympics in Sochi, in parallel giant slalom and parallel slalom.

In February 2023, she won a bronze medal at the Snowboarding World Championships in Bakuriani, Georgia, in the parallel giant slalom.
