= Michelle Dekker =

Dutch snowboarder (born 1996)

Personal information
- Born: 18 March 1996 (age 30) Zoetermeer, Netherlands

Sport
- Sport: Skiing
Medal record
Women's snowboarding
Representing the Netherlands
World Championships
Bronze medal – third place	2025 Engadin	Parallel slalom

Michelle Dekker (born 18 March 1996 in Zoetermeer) is a Dutch snowboarder, specializing in Alpine snowboarding.

== Career ==
Dekker competed at the 2014 Winter Olympics for Netherlands. She was 22nd in the qualifying run of the parallel giant slalom, and 19th in the qualifying round of the parallel slalom, not advancing in either event.

Dekker made her World Cup debut in December 2012. As of September 2014, her best finish is 10th, in a parallel slalom at Bad Gastein in 2013–14. Her best overall finish is 24th, in 2013–14.
