= Gong Naiying =

Chinese snowboarder (born 1998)

Personal information
- Born: 16 July 1998 (age 27) Heilongjiang, China

Sport
- Country: China
- Sport: Snowboarding

Gong Naiying (born 16 July 1998) is a Chinese snowboarder.

She competed in the 2015 and 2017 FIS Snowboard World Championships, and in the 2018 Winter Olympics, in parallel giant slalom.
