= FIS Freestyle Ski and Snowboarding World Championships 2015 – Women's snowboard halfpipe =

The women's snowboard halfpipe competition of the FIS Freestyle Ski and Snowboarding World Championships 2015 was held at Kreischberg, Austria on January 16 (qualifying) and January 17 (finals). 23 athletes from 13 countries competed.

== Qualification ==
The following are the results of the qualification.

Rank	Bib	Name	Country	Run 1	Run 2	Best	Notes
1	10	Clemence Grimal	France	83.25	90.00	90.00	Q
2	8	Cai Xuetong	China	86.25	88.50	88.50	Q
3	9	Torah Bright	Australia	62.75	86.75	86.75	Q
4	16	Queralt Castellet	Spain	85.75	77.75	85.75	Q
5	11	Sophie Rodriguez	France	9.75	82.25	82.25	Q
6	12	Hikaru Oe	Japan	73.75	76.00	76.00	Q
7	7	Li Shuang	China	75.50	75.00	75.50	
8	13	Mirabelle Thovex	France	61.75	68.25	68.25	
9	17	Verena Rohrer	Switzerland	49.00	66.00	66.00	
10	18	Sun Zhifeng	China	41.75	58.25	58.25	
11	28	Noelle Edwards	United States	55.25	51.00	55.25	
12	21	Cilka Sadar	Slovenia	53.50	47.50	53.50	
13	22	Šárka Pančochová	Czech Republic	50.00	52.75	52.75	
14	27	Summer Fenton	United States	44.00	51.75	51.75	
15	19	Katie Tsuyuki	Canada	38.25	44.75	44.75	
16	24	Emily Arthur	Australia	39.75	41.75	41.75	
17	23	Calynn Irwin	Canada	24.75	39.75	39.75	
18	29	Kwon Sun-oo	South Korea	34.75	36.00	36.00	
19	15	Alexandra Duckworth	Canada	19.50	34.25	34.25	
20	14	Ella Suitiala	Finland	33.25	33.00	33.25	
21	20	Holly Crawford	Australia	11.75	11.00	11.75	
22	25	Wang Xuemei	China	9.50	4.25	9.50	
	26	Morena Makar	Croatia			DNS	

== Final ==
The following are the results of the finals.

Rank	Bib	Name	Country	Run 1	Run 2	Run 3	Best
1st place, gold medalist(s)	2	Cai Xuetong	China	90.25	94.25	89.25	94.25
2nd place, silver medalist(s)	4	Queralt Castellet	Spain	81.25	18.75	21.00	81.25
3rd place, bronze medalist(s)	1	Clemence Grimal	France	31.75	80.25	40.50	80.25
4	6	Hikaru Oe	Japan	71.25	39.25	72.25	72.25
5	5	Sophie Rodriguez	France	65.25	63.00	37.00	65.25
6	3	Torah Bright	Australia	43.25	37.00	57.00	57.00
