= FIS Snowboarding World Championships 2013 – Women's halfpipe =

The women's halfpipe competition of the 2013 FIS Snowboarding World Championships was held in Stoneham-et-Tewkesbury, Québec, Canada on January 19 & 20, 2013. 31 athletes from 13 countries competed.

== Medalists ==
Gold	Arielle Gold; United States (USA)
Silver	Holly Crawford; Australia (AUS)
Bronze	Sophie Rodriguez; France (FRA)

== Results ==
=== Qualification ===
The following are the results of the qualification.

Rank	Bib	Name	Country	Run 1	Run 2	Best Score	Note
1	4	Li Shuang	China	85.00	88.33	88.33	QF
2	17	Arielle Gold	United States	85.00	56.00	85.00	QF
3	22	Holly Crawford	Australia	62.33	82.00	82.00	QF
4	6	Kaitlyn Farrington	United States	76.33	81.66	81.66	QF
5	18	Queralt Castellet	Spain	77.66	81.33	81.33	QSF
6	8	Sophie Rodriguez	France	64.00	76.66	76.66	QSF
7	30	Sun Zhifeng	China	56.66	66.66	66.66	QSF
8	7	Mirabelle Thovex	France	57.66	62.00	62.00	QSF
9	31	Serena Shaw	United States	48.00	61.66	61.66	QSF
10	10	Alexandra Duckworth	Canada	7.00	60.66	60.66	QSF
11	12	Šárka Pančochová	Czech Republic	57.33	48.33	57.33	
12	15	Kelly Marren	United States	56.66	31.33	56.66	
13	13	Amber Arazny	Australia	44.33	54.33	54.33	
14	20	Mercedes Nicoll	Canada	40.00	52.66	52.66	
15	23	Katie Tsuyuki	Canada	31.66	52.33	52.33	
16	14	Stephanie Magiros	Australia	52.00	26.33	52.00	
17	2	Cilka Sadar	Slovenia	36.33	50.00	50.00	
18	5	Nadja Purtschert	Switzerland	40.66	47.33	47.33	
19	26	Hannah Trigger	Australia	44.66	31.66	44.66	
20	27	Xu Xiujuan	China	40.33	27.66	40.33	
21	25	Morena Makar	Croatia	38.66	26.66	38.66	
22	29	Alexandra Fitch	Australia	38.00	17.00	38.00	
23	9	Katerina Vojackova	Czech Republic	36.66	28.33	36.66	
24	28	Joanna Zając	Poland	32.33	17.00	32.33	
25	11	Julia Piasecka	Poland	21.33	20.33	21.33	
25	21	Calynn Irwin	Canada	21.33	13.66	21.33	
27	3	Ursina Haller	Switzerland	9.00	19.33	19.33	
28	24	Wang Xuemei	China	14.33	14.33	14.33	
29	1	Anja Štefan	Croatia	12.00	3.33	12.00	
	16	Natallia Karamushka	Belarus	DNS	DNS	DNS	
	19	Ella Suitiala	Finland	DNS	DNS	DNS	

=== Semifinal ===
Rank	Bib	Name	Country	Run 1	Run 2	Best Score	Note
1	8	Sophie Rodriguez	France	78.00	73.00	78.00	Q
2	18	Queralt Castellet	Spain	77.00	72.50	77.00	Q
3	7	Mirabelle Thovex	France	63.75	67.75	67.75	
4	30	Sun Zhifeng	China	64.75	38.00	64.75	
5	31	Serena Shaw	United States	31.25	46.50	46.50	
6	10	Alexandra Duckworth	Canada	20.00	8.50	20.00	

=== Final ===
Rank	Bib	Name	Country	Run 1	Run 2	Best Score	Note
1st place, gold medalist(s)	17	Arielle Gold	United States	79.00	65.25	79.00	
2nd place, silver medalist(s)	22	Holly Crawford	Australia	66.25	77.25	77.25	
3rd place, bronze medalist(s)	8	Sophie Rodriguez	France	72.50	17.00	72.50	
4	6	Kaitlyn Farrington	United States	70.25	36.25	70.25	
5	18	Queralt Castellet	Spain	58.75	23.25	58.75	
6	4	Li Shuang	China	52.75	54.00	54.00	
