= Snowboarding at the 2014 Winter Olympics – Women's halfpipe =

Women's halfpipe at the XXII Olympic Winter Games
- Venue: Rosa Khutor Extreme Park
- Date: 12 February 2014
- Competitors: 28 from 13 nations
- Winning score: 91.75

Medalists
1st place, gold medalist(s)		Kaitlyn Farrington	United States
2nd place, silver medalist(s)		Torah Bright	Australia
3rd place, bronze medalist(s)		Kelly Clark	United States

The women's halfpipe competition of the Sochi 2014 Olympics was held at Rosa Khutor Extreme Park on 12 February 2014.

== Schedule ==
All times are (UTC+4).

Date	Time	Round
12 February	14:00	Qualification
12 February	19:00	Semifinals
12 February	21:30	Final

== Results ==
=== Qualification ===
The qualification was held at 2:00 p.m. (Sochi time).

Rank	Heat	Bib	Name	Country	Run 1	Run 2	Best	Notes
1	1	2	Kelly Clark	United States	92.25	95.00	95.00	QF
2	1	7	Queralt Castellet	Spain	93.25	52.00	93.25	QF
3	1	1	Sophie Rodriguez	France	78.50	25.50	78.50	QF
4	1	4	Li Shuang	China	77.75	54.00	77.75	QS
5	1	3	Ursina Haller	Switzerland	69.00	74.75	74.75	QS
6	1	6	Sun Zhifeng	China	70.00	45.75	70.00	QS
7	1	12	Alexandra Duckworth	Canada	42.25	69.75	69.75	QS
8	1	9	Šárka Pančochová	Czech Republic	42.75	66.25	66.25	QS
9	1	10	Stephanie Magiros	Australia	27.25	57.25	57.25	QS
10	1	11	Hannah Trigger	Australia	51.25	33.00	51.25	
11	1	8	Rebecca Sinclair	New Zealand	32.25	48.25	48.25	
12	1	13	Nadja Purtschert	Switzerland	47.50	20.75	47.50	
13	1	14	Morena Makar	Croatia	44.75	22.75	44.75	
14	1	5	Holly Crawford	Australia	43.00	33.75	43.00	
1	2	28	Torah Bright	Australia	93.00	28.75	93.00	QF
2	2	27	Hannah Teter	United States	90.25	92.00	92.00	QF
3	2	20	Cai Xuetong	China	74.25	88.00	88.00	QF
4	2	21	Kaitlyn Farrington	United States	87.00	34.50	87.00	QS
5	2	22	Liu Jiayu	China	81.50	83.50	83.50	QS
6	2	18	Mirabelle Thovex	France	71.75	69.75	71.75	QS
7	2	17	Rana Okada	Japan	66.00	69.75	69.75	QS
8	2	19	Clémence Grimal	France	16.00	66.50	66.50	QS
9	2	24	Katie Tsuyuki	Canada	45.75	54.25	54.25	QS
10	2	16	Ella Suitiala	Finland	31.75	51.50	51.50	
11	2	23	Joanna Zając	Poland	47.75	39.75	47.75	
12	2	26	Mercedes Nicoll	Canada	43.50	26.50	43.50	
13	2	25	Verena Rohrer	Switzerland	34.50	31.50	34.50	
–	2	15	Arielle Gold	United States	DNS^{[a]}			

QF – Qualify directly to final; QS – Qualify to semifinal; DNS – Did not start

=== Semifinals ===
The semifinals was held at 7:30 p.m. (Sochi time)

Rank	Bib	Name	Country	Run 1	Run 2	Best	Notes
1	21	Kaitlyn Farrington	United States	87.50	53.25	87.50	Q
2	22	Liu Jiayu	China	81.25	29.00	81.25	Q
3	4	Li Shuang	China	80.00	56.75	80.00	Q
4	3	Ursina Haller	Switzerland	74.50	43.00	74.50	Q
5	18	Mirabelle Thovex	France	70.75	39.75	70.75	Q
6	17	Rana Okada	Japan	58.50	70.00	70.00	Q
7	24	Katie Tsuyuki	Canada	55.50	56.25	56.25	
8	19	Clémence Grimal	France	14.00	38.25	38.25	
9	6	Sun Zhifeng	China	35.75	35.75	35.75	
10	9	Šárka Pančochová	Czech Republic	34.00	31.50	34.00	
11	12	Alexandra Duckworth	Canada	32.50	25.75	32.50	
12	10	Stephanie Magiros	Australia	26.50	20.50	26.50	

Q – Qualify to final

=== Final ===
The final was held at 10:00 p.m. (Sochi time).

Rank	Bib	Name	Country	Run 1	Run 2	Best
1st place, gold medalist(s)	21	Kaitlyn Farrington	United States	85.75	91.75	91.75
2nd place, silver medalist(s)	28	Torah Bright	Australia	58.25	91.50	91.50
3rd place, bronze medalist(s)	2	Kelly Clark	United States	48.25	90.75	90.75
4	27	Hannah Teter	United States	90.50	26.75	90.50
5	17	Rana Okada	Japan	47.75	85.50	85.50
6	20	Cai Xuetong	China	84.25	25.00	84.25
7	1	Sophie Rodriguez	France	77.75	79.50	79.50
8	4	Li Shuang	China	73.25	23.75	73.25
9	22	Liu Jiayu	China	15.75	68.25	68.25
10	18	Mirabelle Thovex	France	67.00	34.75	67.00
11	7	Queralt Castellet	Spain	61.75	55.25	61.75
12	3	Ursina Haller	Switzerland	48.75	26.75	48.75

== Judges and officials ==
Judges: Ola Sundekvist, Kyoji Yokoyama, Guido Van Meel, Klara Suchanova, Phoebe Mills, Iztok Sumatic.

Officials: William Van Gilder (FIS Technical Delegate), Alexey Potapov (Competition Chief), Brandon Wong (Head Judge), Uwe Beier (FIS Race Director), Roberto Moresi (FIS Assistant Race Director), Valentin Danoskiy (Chief of Halfpipe), John Melville (Halfpipe Technical Advisor).

== Notes ==
a American Arielle Gold had to pull out of the competition after injuring her shoulder during a practice run and crash at Rosa Khutor Extreme Park, moments before the competition.
