= FIS Snowboarding World Championships 2011 – Women's halfpipe =

The women's halfpipe competition of the FIS Snowboarding World Championships 2011 was held at Alabaus in La Molina, Spain between January 19 and 20, 2011. 32 athletes from 15 countries competed.

The qualification round was completed on January 19, while the final was completed on January 20.

== Results ==
=== Qualification ===
The results of the qualification round:

Heat 1

| Rank | Bib | Name | Country | Run 1 | Run 2 | Best | Notes |
|---|---|---|---|---|---|---|---|
| 1 | 5 | Liu Jiayu | China | 25.2 | 27.0 | 27.0 | QF |
| 2 | 7 | Cai Xuetong | China | 25.4 | 25.1 | 25.4 | QF |
| 3 | 8 | Sun Zhifeng | China | 25.3 | 8.2 | 25.3 | QF |
| 4 | 3 | Sophie Rodriguez | France | 23.3 | 22.6 | 23.3 | QSF |
| 5 | 4 | Šárka Pančochová | Czech Republic | 20.0 | 22.3 | 22.3 | QSF |
| 6 | 2 | Paulina Ligocka | Poland | 19.5 | 22.2 | 22.2 | QSF |
| 7 | 1 | Mercedes Nicoll | Canada | 21.9 | 22.1 | 22.1 | QSF |
| 8 | 6 | Mirabelle Thovex | France | 16.7 | 19.7 | 19.7 | QSF |
| 9 | 9 | Nadja Purtschert | Switzerland | 19.6 | 17.5 | 19.6 | QSF |
| 10 | 13 | Kendall Brown | New Zealand | 15.6 | 9.1 | 15.6 | |
| 11 | 12 | Allyson Carroll | United States | 6.5 | 15.1 | 15.1 | |
| 12 | 10 | Elena Alekhina | Russia | 12.0 | 10.4 | 12.0 | |
| 13 | 11 | Haruna Matsumoto | Japan | 8.5 | 11.7 | 11.7 | |
| 14 | 16 | Tiina Lindström | Finland | 11.5 | 10.2 | 11.5 | |
| 15 | 14 | Summer Fenton | United States | 10.0 | 9.1 | 10.0 | |
| 16 | 15 | Anja Stefan | Croatia | 8.6 | 8.4 | 8.6 | |

Heat 2:

| Rank | Bib | Name | Country | Run 1 | Run 2 | Best | Notes |
|---|---|---|---|---|---|---|---|
| 1 | 24 | Holly Crawford | Australia | 23.7 | 23.9 | 23.9 | QF |
| 2 | 25 | Rana Okada | Japan | 22.6 | 23.6 | 23.6 | QF |
| 3 | 23 | Ursina Haller | Switzerland | 22.7 | 21.3 | 22.7 | QF |
| 4 | 22 | Sarah Conrad | Canada | 19.2 | 22.3 | 22.3 | QSF |
| 5 | 26 | Rebecca Sinclair | New Zealand | 17.1 | 20.7 | 20.7 | QSF |
| 6 | 21 | Alexandra Duckworth | Canada | 20.5 | 17.6 | 20.5 | QSF |
| 7 | 18 | Anne Sophie Pellissier | France | 16.5 | 19.7 | 19.7 | QSF |
| 8 | 32 | Xu Xiujuan | China | 19.4 | 10.2 | 19.4 | QSF |
| 9 | 28 | Claire Bidez | United States | 8.8 | 18.8 | 18.8 | QSF |
| 10 | 30 | Enni Rukajärvi | Finland | 11.4 | 13.4 | 13.4 | |
| 11 | 27 | Pia Meusburger | Austria | 10.9 | 13.1 | 13.1 | |
| 12 | 20 | Palmer Taylor | Canada | 11.7 | 4.4 | 11.7 | |
| 13 | 29 | Saana Pehkonen | Finland | 9.8 | 10.7 | 10.7 | |
| 14 | 31 | Merika Enne | Finland | 8.5 | 9.3 | 9.3 | |
| 15 | 17 | Cilka Sadar | Slovenia | 2.1 | 2.0 | 2.0 | |
| 16 | 19 | Chen Xu | China | 1.3 | DNS | 1.3 | |

=== Semifinal ===
The results of the semifinal round:

| Rank | Bib | Name | Country | Run 1 | Run 2 | Best | Notes |
|---|---|---|---|---|---|---|---|
| 1 | 3 | Sophie Rodriguez | France | 6.0 | 23.9 | 23.9 | Q |
| 2 | 26 | Rebecca Sinclair | New Zealand | 22.8 | 18.4 | 22.8 | Q |
| 3 | 1 | Mercedes Nicoll | Canada | 21.8 | 0.9 | 21.8 | Q |
| 4 | 2 | Paulina Ligocka | Poland | 21.0 | 17.4 | 21.0 | Q |
| 5 | 18 | Anne Sophie Pellissier | France | 16.5 | 20.5 | 20.5 | Q |
| 6 | 6 | Mirabelle Thovex | France | 19.2 | 11.5 | 19.2 | Q |
| 7 | 32 | Xu Xiujuan | China | 19.0 | 8.1 | 19.0 | |
| 8 | 21 | Alexandra Duckworth | Canada | 18.9 | 10.6 | 18.9 | |
| 9 | 9 | Nadja Purtschert | Switzerland | 5.0 | 16.3 | 16.3 | |
| 10 | 22 | Sarah Conrad | Canada | 1.6 | 15.8 | 15.8 | |
| 11 | 4 | Šárka Pančochová | Czech Republic | 9.0 | 2.4 | 9.0 | |
| | 28 | Claire Bidez | United States | | | | DNS |

=== Final ===
The results of the final round:The results of the semifinal round:

| Rank | Bib | Name | Country | Run 1 | Run 2 | Best | Notes |
|---|---|---|---|---|---|---|---|
| 1st place, gold medalist(s) | 24 | Holly Crawford | Australia | 26.7 | 11.1 | 26.7 | |
| 2nd place, silver medalist(s) | 23 | Ursina Haller | Switzerland | 22.8 | 18.4 | 22.8 | |
| 3rd place, bronze medalist(s) | 5 | Liu Jiayu | China | 22.5 | 0.9 | 22.5 | |
| 4 | 26 | Rebecca Sinclair | New Zealand | 22.0 | 3.9 | 22.0 | |
| 5 | 8 | Sun Zhifeng | China | 2.7 | 21.1 | 21.1 | |
| 6 | 7 | Cai Xuetong | China | 18.7 | 11.2 | 18.7 | |
| 7 | 6 | Mirabelle Thovex | France | 3.8 | 16.4 | 16.4 | |
| 8 | 1 | Mercedes Nicoll | Canada | 16.3 | 9.7 | 16.3 | |
| 9 | 18 | Anne Sophie Pellissier | France | 5.0 | 14.3 | 14.3 | |
| 10 | 25 | Rana Okada | Japan | 8.3 | 12.3 | 12.3 | |
| 11 | 2 | Paulina Ligocka | Poland | 10.9 | 2.0 | 10.9 | |
| 12 | 3 | Sophie Rodriguez | France | 6.5 | 1.6 | 6.5 | |
