= Snowboarding at the 2010 Winter Olympics – Women's halfpipe =

Women's halfpipe at the XXI Olympic Winter Games
- Venue: Cypress Mountain
- Date: February 18, 2010
- Competitors: 30 from 14 nations
- Winning score: 45.0

Medalists
1st place, gold medalist(s)		Torah Bright	Australia
2nd place, silver medalist(s)		Hannah Teter	United States
3rd place, bronze medalist(s)		Kelly Clark	United States

The women's halfpipe competition of the Vancouver 2010 Olympics was held at Cypress Mountain on February 18, 2010.

== Results ==
=== Qualification ===
Rank	Heat	Bib	Name	Country	Run 1	Run 2	Best	Notes
1	1	1	Torah Bright	Australia	41.3	45.8	45.8	QF
2	1	12	Kelly Clark	United States	45.4	13.6	45.4	QF
3	1	22	Queralt Castellet	Spain	44.3	19.9	44.3	QF
4	1	14	Hannah Teter	United States	39.7	42.7	42.7	QF
5	1	6	Gretchen Bleiler	United States	36.6	40.2	40.2	QF
6	1	4	Sun Zhifeng	China	38.2	39.9	39.9	QF
7	1	15	Holly Crawford	Australia	38.6	39.5	39.5	QS
8	1	3	Elena Hight	United States	35.7	37.9	37.9	QS
9	1	10	Soko Yamaoka	Japan	34.8	37.0	37.0	QS
10	1	26	Mercedes Nicoll	Canada	31.1	34.6	34.6	QS
11	1	8	Sophie Rodriguez	France	30.1	34.5	34.5	QS
12	1	7	Liu Jiayu	China	26.3	33.3	33.3	QS
13	1	28	Ursina Haller	Switzerland	28.3	31.9	31.9	QS
14	1	11	Shiho Nakashima	Japan	31.4	12.3	31.4	QS
15	1	16	Sarah Conrad	Canada	14.4	31.2	31.2	QS
16	1	30	Kendall Brown	New Zealand	11.4	29.5	29.5	QS
17	1	9	Šárka Pančochová	Czech Republic	15.4	28.1	28.1	QS
18	1	21	Cilka Sadar	Slovenia	18.2	26.8	26.8	QS
19	1	29	Lisa Wiik	Norway	23.0	26.5	26.5	
20	1	19	Mirabelle Thovex	France	14.6	24.0	24.0	
21	1	23	Rebecca Sinclair	New Zealand	14.7	23.7	23.7	
22	1	5	Kjersti Buaas	Norway	20.6	21.8	21.8	
23	1	13	Cai Xuetong	China	14.1	19.3	19.3	
24	1	27	Juliane Bray	New Zealand	17.8	15.5	17.8	
25	1	25	Manuela Pesko	Switzerland	12.2	17.5	17.5	
26	1	24	Palmer Taylor	Canada	12.9	13.7	13.7	
27	1	20	Linn Haug	Norway	11.5	12.8	12.8	
28	1	17	Paulina Ligocka	Poland	10.9	11.1	11.1	
29	1	2	Rana Okada	Japan	7.2	2.7	7.2	
30	1	18	Lesley McKenna	Great Britain	5.1	2.8	5.1	

=== Semifinal ===
Rank	Bib	Name	Country	Run 1	Run 2	Best	Notes
1	15	Holly Crawford	Australia	17.3	41.7	41.7	QF
2	7	Liu Jiayu	China	41.1	36.2	41.1	QF
3	26	Mercedes Nicoll	Canada	40.1	28.5	40.1	QF
4	3	Elena Hight	United States	37.1	10.8	37.1	QF
5	8	Sophie Rodriguez	France	36.9	9.5	36.9	QF
6	28	Ursina Haller	Switzerland	35.4	31.9	35.4	QF
7	11	Shiho Nakashima	Japan	34.9	15.2	34.9	
8	9	Šárka Pančochová	Czech Republic	34.4	24.9	34.4	
9	30	Kendall Brown	New Zealand	33.3	28.2	33.3	
10	10	Soko Yamaoka	Japan	30.6	24.9	30.6	
11	21	Cilka Sadar	Slovenia	30.1	21.5	30.1	
12	16	Sarah Conrad	Canada	17.8	21.4	21.4	

=== Final ===
Rank	Bib	Name	Country	Run 1	Run 2	Best	Notes
1st place, gold medalist(s)	1	Torah Bright	Australia	5.9	45.0	45.0	
2nd place, silver medalist(s)	14	Hannah Teter	United States	42.4	39.2	42.4	
3rd place, bronze medalist(s)	12	Kelly Clark	United States	25.6	42.2	42.2	
4	7	Liu Jiayu	China	39.3	34.9	39.3	
5	8	Sophie Rodriguez	France	34.4	8.3	34.4	
6	26	Mercedes Nicoll	Canada	34.3	2.9	34.3	
7	4	Sun Zhifeng	China	29.8	33.0	33.0	
8	15	Holly Crawford	Australia	23.9	30.3	30.3	
9	28	Ursina Haller	Switzerland	27.9	18.1	27.9	
10	3	Elena Hight	United States	24.6	16.0	24.6	
11	6	Gretchen Bleiler	United States	11.0	14.7	14.7	
	22	Queralt Castellet	Spain	DNF	DNS	DNS	Injured
