= Snowboarding at the 2018 Winter Olympics – Women's halfpipe =

Women's halfpipe at the XXIII Olympic Winter Games
- Venue: Bogwang Phoenix Park
- Date: 12 February (qualification); 13 February (final)
- Competitors: 24 from 10 nations
- Winning Score: 98.25

Medalists
| 1st place, gold medalist(s) | | Chloe Kim | United States |
| 2nd place, silver medalist(s) | | Liu Jiayu | China |
| 3rd place, bronze medalist(s) | | Arielle Gold | United States |

The women's halfpipe competition of the 2018 Winter Olympics was held from 12 to 13 February 2018 at the Bogwang Phoenix Park in Pyeongchang, South Korea.

Chloe Kim became the youngest woman to win an Olympic snowboarding gold medal at just 17 years old.

In the victory ceremony, the medals were presented by Larry Probst, member of the International Olympic Committee, accompanied by Dexter Paine, International Ski Federation vice president.

== Qualification ==
The top 24 athletes in the Olympic quota allocation list qualified, with a maximum of four athletes per National Olympic Committee (NOC) allowed. All athletes qualifying must also have placed in the top 30 of a FIS World Cup event or the FIS Freestyle Ski and Snowboarding World Championships 2017 during the qualification period (July 1, 2016 to January 21, 2018) and also have a minimum of 50 FIS points to compete. If the host country, South Korea at the 2018 Winter Olympics did not qualify, their chosen athlete would displace the last qualified athlete, granted all qualification criterion was met.

== Results ==
=== Qualification ===
Q — Qualified for the Final

The top 12 athletes in the qualifiers move on to the medal round.

| Rank | Order | Name | Country | Run 1 | Run 2 | Best | Notes |
|---|---|---|---|---|---|---|---|
| 1 | 3 | Chloe Kim | United States | 91.50 | 95.50 | 95.50 | Q |
| 2 | 10 | Liu Jiayu | China | 87.75 | 41.00 | 87.75 | Q |
| 3 | 11 | Haruna Matsumoto | Japan | 80.75 | 84.25 | 84.25 | Q |
| 4 | 1 | Maddie Mastro | United States | 83.75 | 76.00 | 83.75 | Q |
| 5 | 2 | Queralt Castellet | Spain | 71.50 | 45.50 | 71.50 | Q |
| 6 | 15 | Cai Xuetong | China | 65.75 | 69.00 | 69.00 | Q |
| 7 | 16 | Sena Tomita | Japan | 59.50 | 66.75 | 66.75 | Q |
| 8 | 5 | Emily Arthur | Australia | 30.25 | 66.50 | 66.50 | Q |
| 9 | 4 | Sophie Rodriguez | France | 65.00 | 13.50 | 65.00 | Q |
| 10 | 9 | Mirabelle Thovex | France | 62.25 | 64.25 | 64.25 | Q |
| 11 | 8 | Kelly Clark | United States | 41.00 | 63.25 | 63.25 | Q |
| 12 | 14 | Arielle Gold | United States | 17.50 | 62.75 | 62.75 | Q |
| 13 | 13 | Holly Crawford | Australia | 57.50 | 20.00 | 57.50 | |
| 14 | 17 | Verena Rohrer | Switzerland | 16.50 | 55.00 | 55.00 | |
| 15 | 6 | Kurumi Imai | Japan | 54.75 | 50.00 | 54.75 | |
| 16 | 19 | Qiu Leng | China | 50.75 | 53.75 | 53.75 | |
| 17 | 12 | Hikaru Ōe | Japan | 10.00 | 51.00 | 51.00 | |
| 18 | 18 | Mercedes Nicoll | Canada | 50.00 | 48.00 | 50.00 | |
| 19 | 20 | Elizabeth Hosking | Canada | 25.25 | 36.75 | 36.75 | |
| 20 | 22 | Kwon Sun-oo | South Korea | 19.25 | 35.00 | 35.00 | |
| 21 | 21 | Kaja Verdnik | Slovenia | 24.75 | 34.00 | 34.00 | |
| 22 | 7 | Li Shuang | China | 24.50 | 9.25 | 24.50 | |
| 23 | 24 | Calynn Irwin | Canada | 23.25 | 16.25 | 23.25 | |
| 24 | 23 | Clémence Grimal | France | 14.25 | 13.00 | 14.25 | |

=== Final ===
The final was held on 13 February at 11:00.

| Rank | Order | Name | Country | Run 1 | Run 2 | Run 3 | Best | Notes |
|---|---|---|---|---|---|---|---|---|
| 1st place, gold medalist(s) | 12 | Chloe Kim | United States | 93.75 | 41.50 | 98.25 | 98.25 | |
| 2nd place, silver medalist(s) | 11 | Liu Jiayu | China | 85.50 | 89.75 | 49.00 | 89.75 | |
| 3rd place, bronze medalist(s) | 1 | Arielle Gold | United States | 10.50 | 74.75 | 85.75 | 85.75 | |
| 4 | 2 | Kelly Clark | United States | 76.25 | 81.75 | 83.50 | 83.50 | |
| 5 | 7 | Cai Xuetong | China | 20.50 | 41.25 | 76.50 | 76.50 | |
| 6 | 10 | Haruna Matsumoto | Japan | 70.00 | 46.25 | 65.75 | 70.00 | |
| 7 | 8 | Queralt Castellet | Spain | 59.75 | 67.75 | 43.75 | 67.75 | |
| 8 | 6 | Sena Tomita | Japan | 65.25 | 34.50 | 60.50 | 65.25 | |
| 9 | 3 | Mirabelle Thovex | France | 59.50 | 30.25 | 63.00 | 63.00 | |
| 10 | 4 | Sophie Rodriguez | France | 50.50 | 14.75 | 13.75 | 50.50 | |
| 11 | 5 | Emily Arthur | Australia | 48.25 | 9.25 | 25.00 | 48.25 | |
| 12 | 9 | Maddie Mastro | United States | 14.00 | 7.50 | 6.50 | 14.00 | |
