= 2009–10 FIS Snowboard World Cup =

International snowboarding competition

Snowboard World Cup 2009/10
Discipline	Men	Women
Overall	(Austria) Benjamin Karl	(Canada) Maëlle Ricker
Parallel slalom	(Austria) Benjamin Karl	(Netherlands) Nicolien Sauerbreij
Snowboard cross	(France) Pierre Vaultier	(Canada) Maëlle Ricker
Halfpipe	(Canada) Justin Lamoureux	(China) Cai Xuetong
Big Air	(Austria) Stefan Gimpl	

Competition
Individual	30	25

The 2009–10 FIS Snowboard World Cup was a multi race tournament over a season for snowboarding. The season started on 9 October 2009 and lasted until 17 March 2010. The World Cup was organised by the FIS who also run world cups and championships in cross-country skiing, ski jumping, Nordic combined, alpine skiing, and snowboarding. The snowboarding world cup consisted of three events, the parallel slalom, snowboard cross, and the halfpipe. The men's side of the world cup also consisted of a big air competition.

== Calendar ==
=== Men ===
==== Parallel Slalom ====
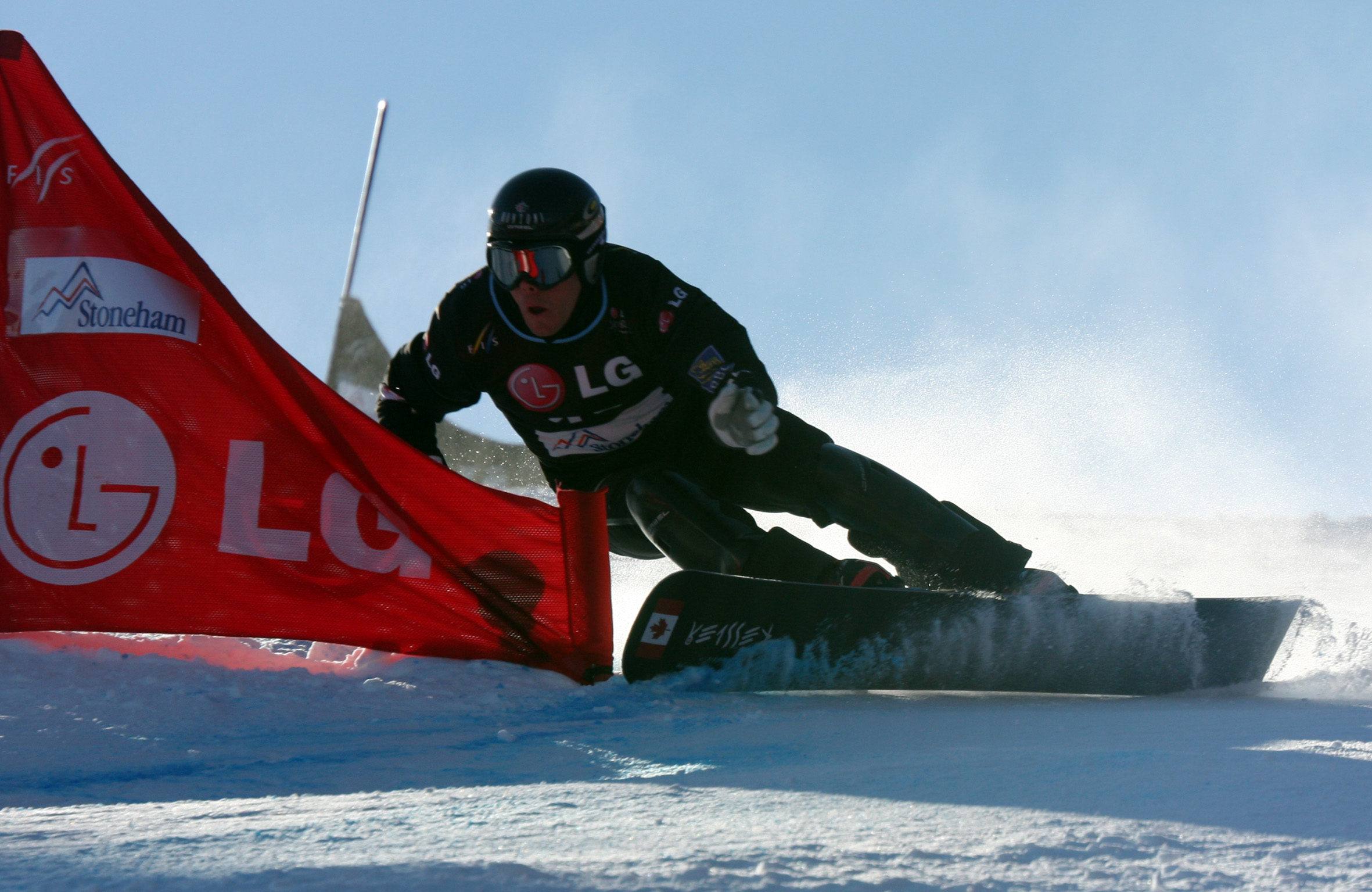
Jasey Jay Anderson competing in Stoneham

Date	Place	Winner	Second	Third
October 9, 2009	Landgraaf, Netherlands	Benjamin Karl (AUT)	Mathieu Bozzetto (FRA)	Jasey Jay Anderson (CAN)
December 6, 2009	Limone Piemonte, Italy	Cancelled and moved to Telluride (race 1)		
December 15, 2009	Telluride, United States	Matthew Morison (CAN)	Benjamin Karl (AUT)	Mathieu Bozzetto (FRA)
December 17, 2009	Telluride, United States	Jasey Jay Anderson (CAN)	Michael Lambert (CAN)	Rok Flander (SLO)
January 6, 2010	Kreischberg, Austria	Jasey Jay Anderson (CAN)	Andreas Prommegger (AUT)	Benjamin Karl (AUT)
January 17, 2010	Nendaz, Switzerland	Michael Lambert (CAN)	Andreas Prommegger (AUT)	Benjamin Karl (AUT)
January 24, 2010	Stoneham, Canada	Benjamin Karl (AUT)	Andreas Prommegger (AUT)	Jasey Jay Anderson (CAN)
February 6, 2010	Sudelfeld, Germany	Andreas Prommegger (AUT)	Benjamin Karl (AUT)	Roland Haldi (SUI)
March 6, 2010	Moscow, Russia	Aaron March (ITA)	Benjamin Karl (AUT)	Roland Fischnaller (ITA)
March 13, 2010	Valmalenco, Italy	Benjamin Karl (AUT)	Rok Flander (SLO)	Jasey Jay Anderson (CAN)
March 21, 2010	La Molina, Spain	Jasey Jay Anderson (CAN)	Matthew Morison (CAN)	Andreas Prommegger (AUT)

==== Snowboard Cross ====
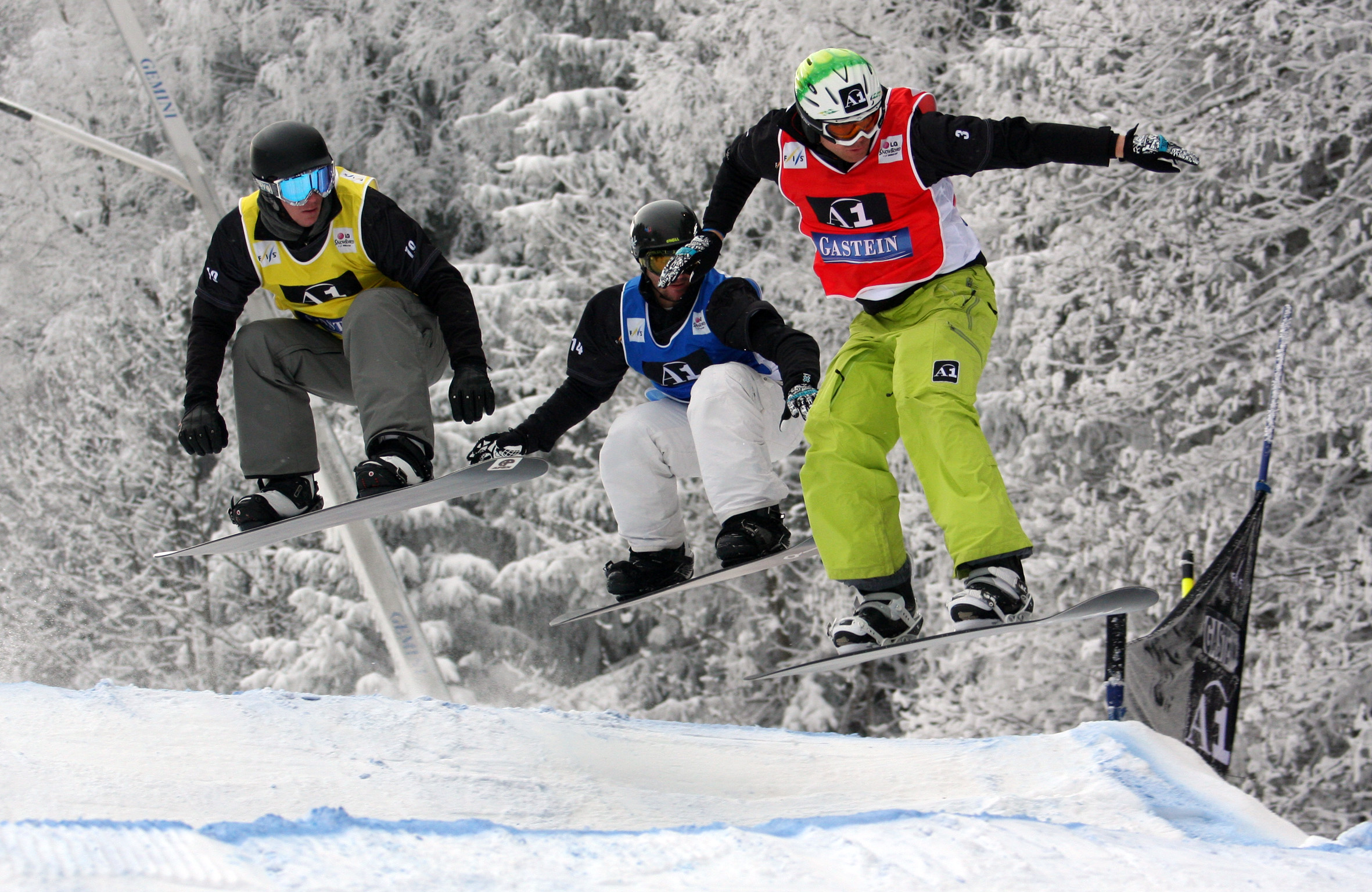
Heat 3 in Bad Gastein

Date	Place	Winner	Second	Third
September 12, 2009	Chapelco, Argentina	Pierre Vaultier (FRA)	Seth Wescott (USA)	Graham Watanabe (USA)
December 19, 2009	Telluride, United States	Pierre Vaultier (FRA)	Robert Fagan (CAN)	Ross Powers (USA)
January 10, 2010	Bad Gastein, Austria	Nate Holland (USA)	Pierre Vaultier (FRA)	Mario Fuchs (AUT)
January 15, 2010	Veysonnaz, Switzerland	Pierre Vaultier (FRA)	David Speiser (GER)	Nick Baumgartner (USA)
January 21, 2010	Stoneham, Canada	Pierre Vaultier (FRA)	Graham Watanabe (USA)	Shaun Palmer (USA)
March 11, 2010	Valmalenco, Italy	Alex Pullin (AUS)	Mario Fuchs (AUT)	Mateusz Ligocki (POL)
March 18, 2010	La Molina, Spain	Pierre Vaultier (FRA)	Alex Pullin (AUS)	Pat Holland (USA)

==== Halfpipe ====
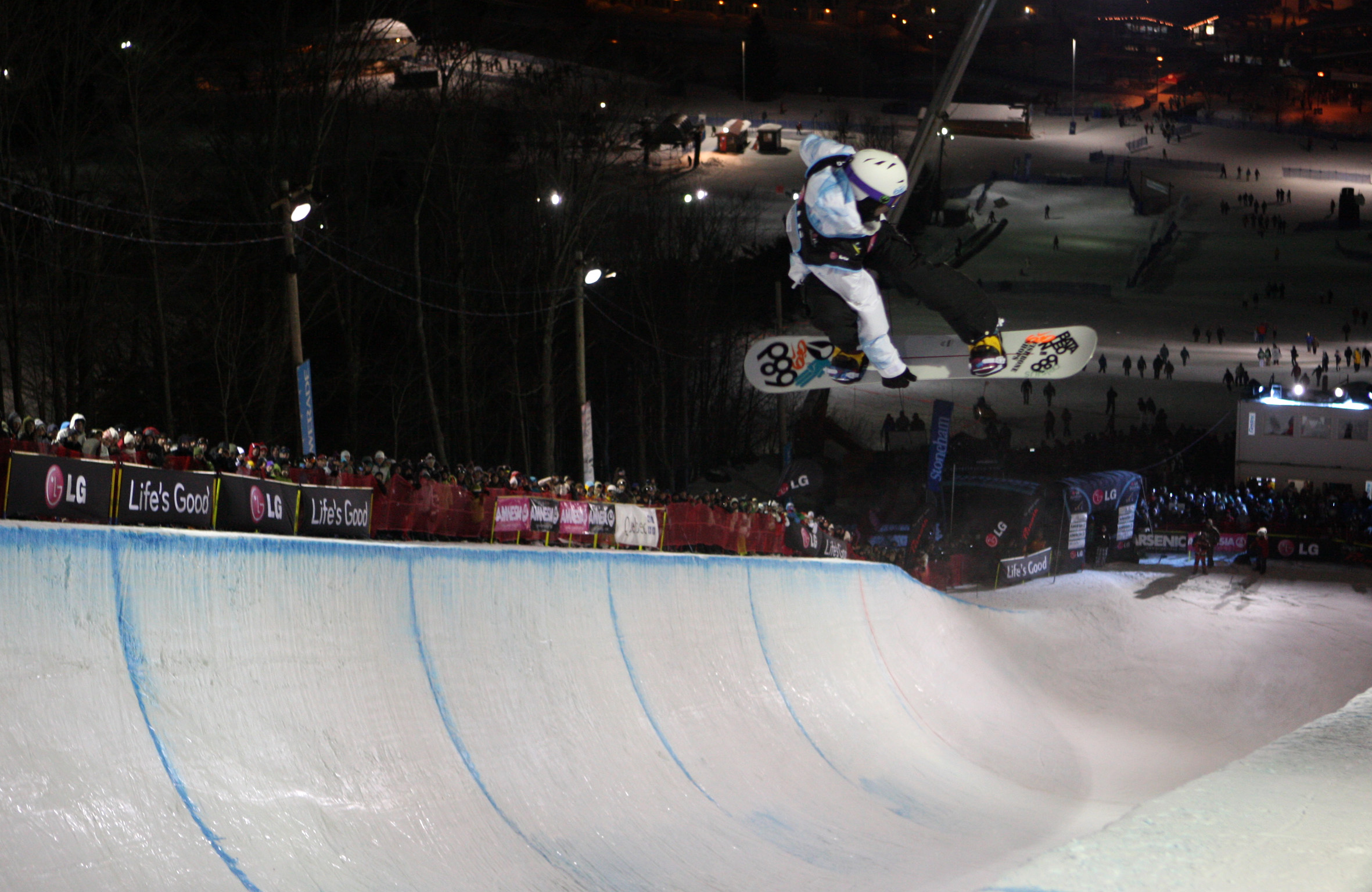
Belgium's Kevin Bronckaers competing in Stoneham

Date	Place	Winner	Second	Third
August 25, 2009	Cardrona, New Zealand	Shaun White (USA)	Iouri Podladtchikov (SUI)	Kazuhiro Kokubo (JPN)
November 5, 2009	Saas-Fee, Switzerland	Kazuhiro Kokubo (JPN)	Mathieu Crepel (FRA)	Peetu Piiroinen (FIN)
January 7, 2010	Kreischberg, Austria	Daisuke Murakami (JPN)	Patrick Burgener (SUI)	Tore-V. Holvik (NOR)
January 22, 2010	Stoneham, Canada	Janne Korpi (FIN)	Jeff Batchelor (CAN)	Antti Autti (FIN)
January 30, 2010	Calgary, Canada	Arthur Longo (FRA)	Justin Lamoureux (CAN)	Ben Kilner (GBR)
March 14, 2010	Valmalenco, Italy	Michał Ligocki (POL)	Roger S. Kleivdal (NOR)	Patrick Burgener (SUI)
March 20, 2010	La Molina, Spain	Fredrik Austbø (NOR)	Christophe Schmidt (GER)	Justin Lamoureux (CAN)

==== Slopestyle ====
The race was counted to the halfpipe World Cup score.

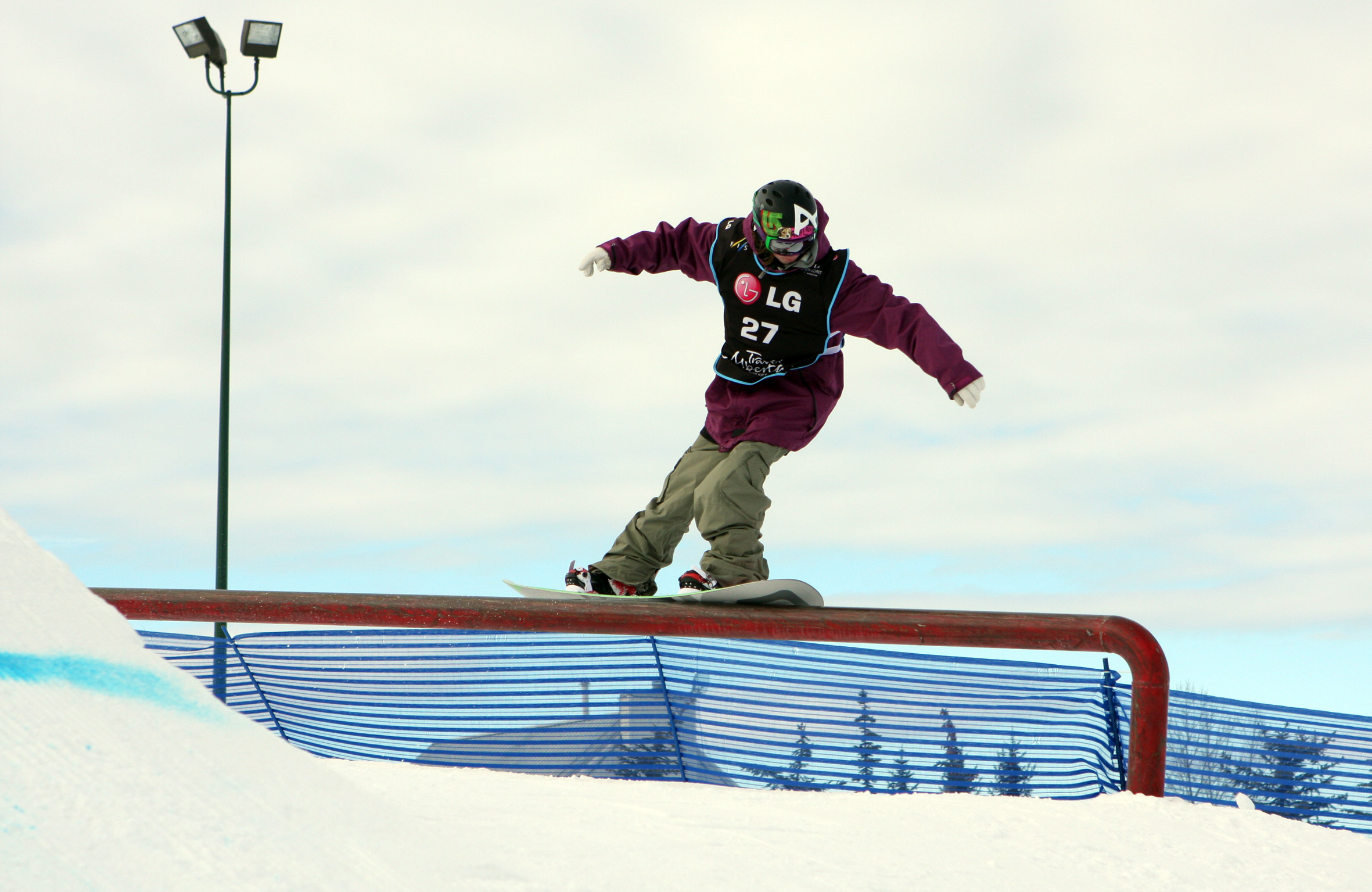
Kevin Backstrom competing in Calgary

Date	Place	Winner	Second	Third
January 31, 2010	Calgary, Canada	Mark McMorris (CAN)	Seppe Smits (BEL)	Nick Brown (NZL)

==== Big Air ====
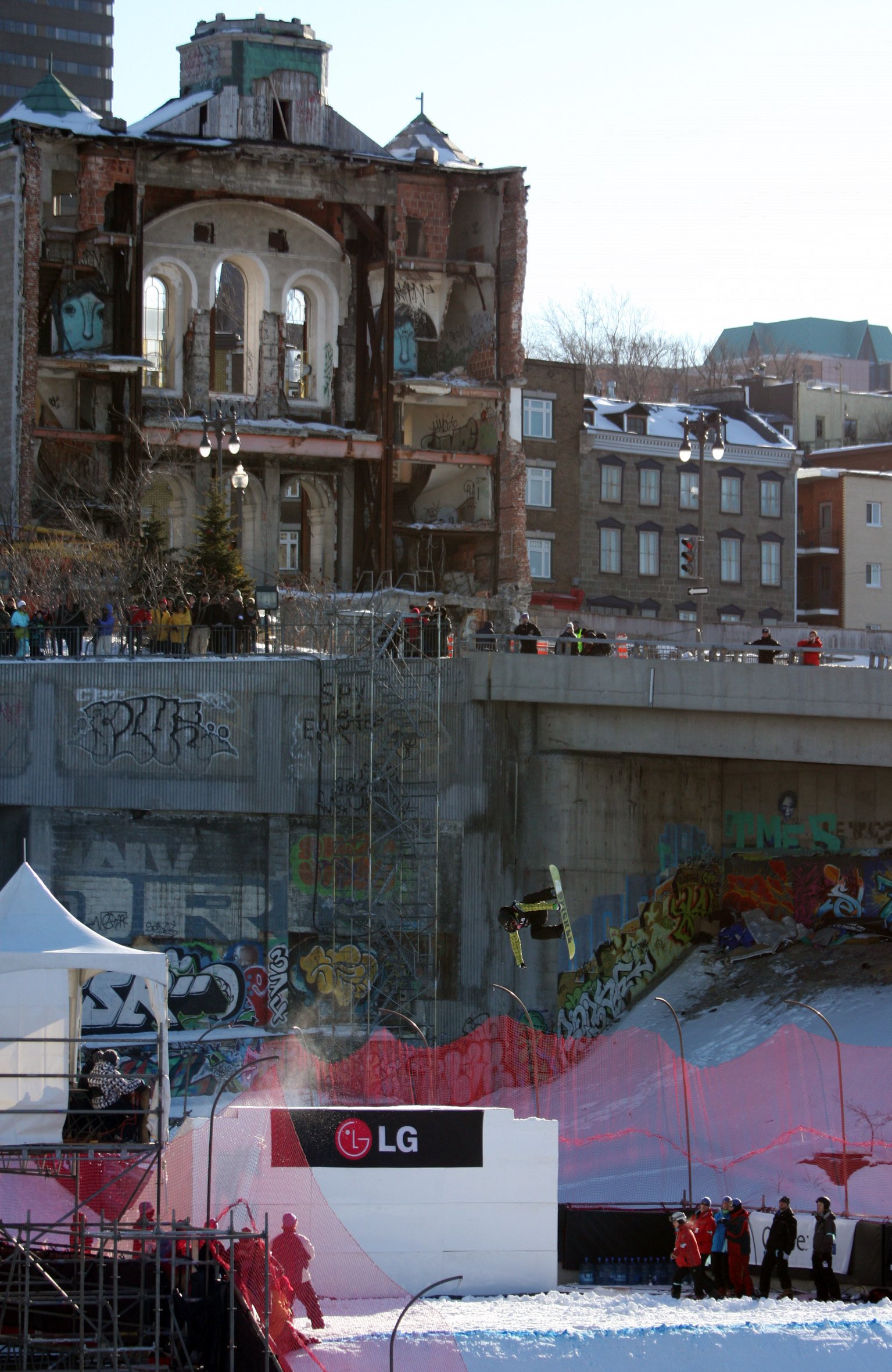
Big Air competitions in Quebec

Date	Place	Winner	Second	Third
October 31, 2009	London, United Kingdom	Stefan Gimpl (AUT)	Gian-Luca Cavigelli (SUI)	Domen Bizjak (SLO)
November 7, 2009	Barcelona, Spain	Stefan Gimpl (AUT)	Gian-Luca Cavigelli (SUI)	Gjermund Braaten (NOR)
November 21, 2009	Stockholm, Sweden	Stefan Gimpl (AUT)	Marko Grilc (SLO)	Gjermund Braaten (NOR)
December 13, 2009	Seoul, South Korea	Gian-Luca Cavigelli (SUI)	Stefan Gimpl (AUT)	Markku Koski (FIN)
January 23, 2010	Quebec, Canada	Janne Korpi (FIN)	Stefan Falkeis (AUT)	Jaakko Ruha (FIN)

=== Women ===
==== Parallel Slalom ====
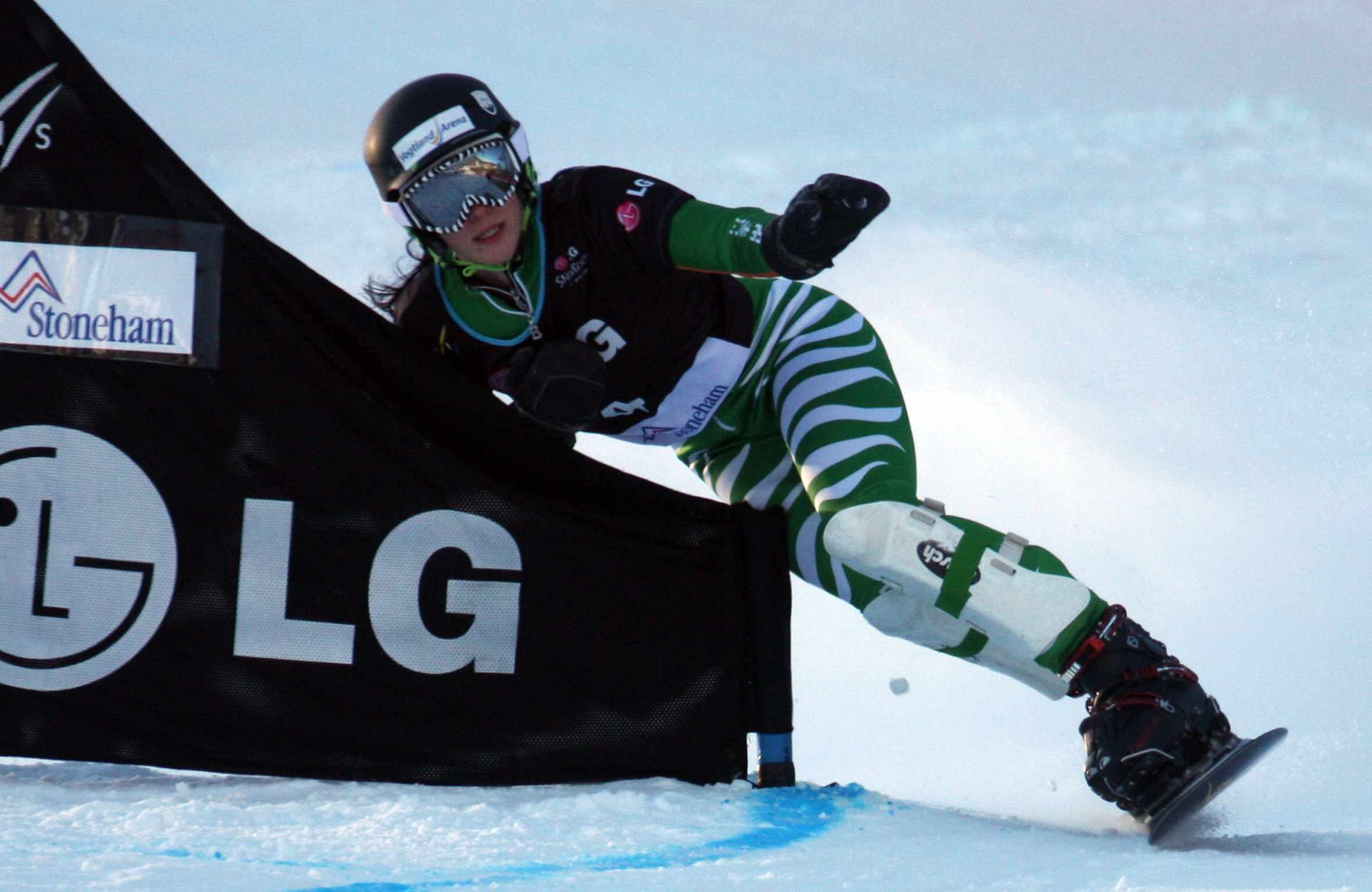
Isabella Laböck competing in Stoneham

Date	Place	Winner	Second	Third
October 9, 2009	Landgraaf, Netherlands	Amelie Kober (GER)	Doris Guenther (AUT)	Claudia Riegler (AUT)
December 6, 2009	Limone Piemonte, Italy	Cancelled and moved to Telluride (race 1)		
December 15, 2009	Telluride, United States	Fraenzi Maegert-Kohli (SUI)	Amelie Kober (GER)	Kimiko Zakreski (CAN)
December 17, 2009	Telluride, United States	Alena Zavarzina (RUS)	Marion Kreiner (AUT)	Ina Meschik (AUT)
January 6, 2010	Kreischberg, Austria	Nicolien Sauerbreij (NED)	Alexa Loo (CAN)	Fraenzi Maegert-Kohli (SUI)
January 17, 2010	Nendaz, Switzerland	Ekaterina Tudegesheva (RUS)	Nicolien Sauerbreij (NED)	Fraenzi Maegert-Kohli (SUI)
January 24, 2010	Stoneham, Canada	Svetlana Boldykova (RUS)	Alena Zavarzina (RUS)	Nathalie Desmares (FRA)
February 6, 2010	Sudelfeld, Germany	Amelie Kober (GER)	Nicolien Sauerbreij (NED)	Marion Kreiner (AUT)
March 6, 2010	Moscow, Russia	Doris Guenther (AUT)	Heidi Neururer (AUT)	Julia Dujmovits (AUT)
March 13, 2010	Valmalenco, Italy	Nicolien Sauerbreij (NED)	Nathalie Desmares (FRA)	Doris Guenther (AUT)
March 21, 2010	La Molina, Spain	Ekaterina Tudegesheva (RUS)	Doris Guenther (AUT)	Ina Meschik (AUT)

==== Snowboard Cross ====
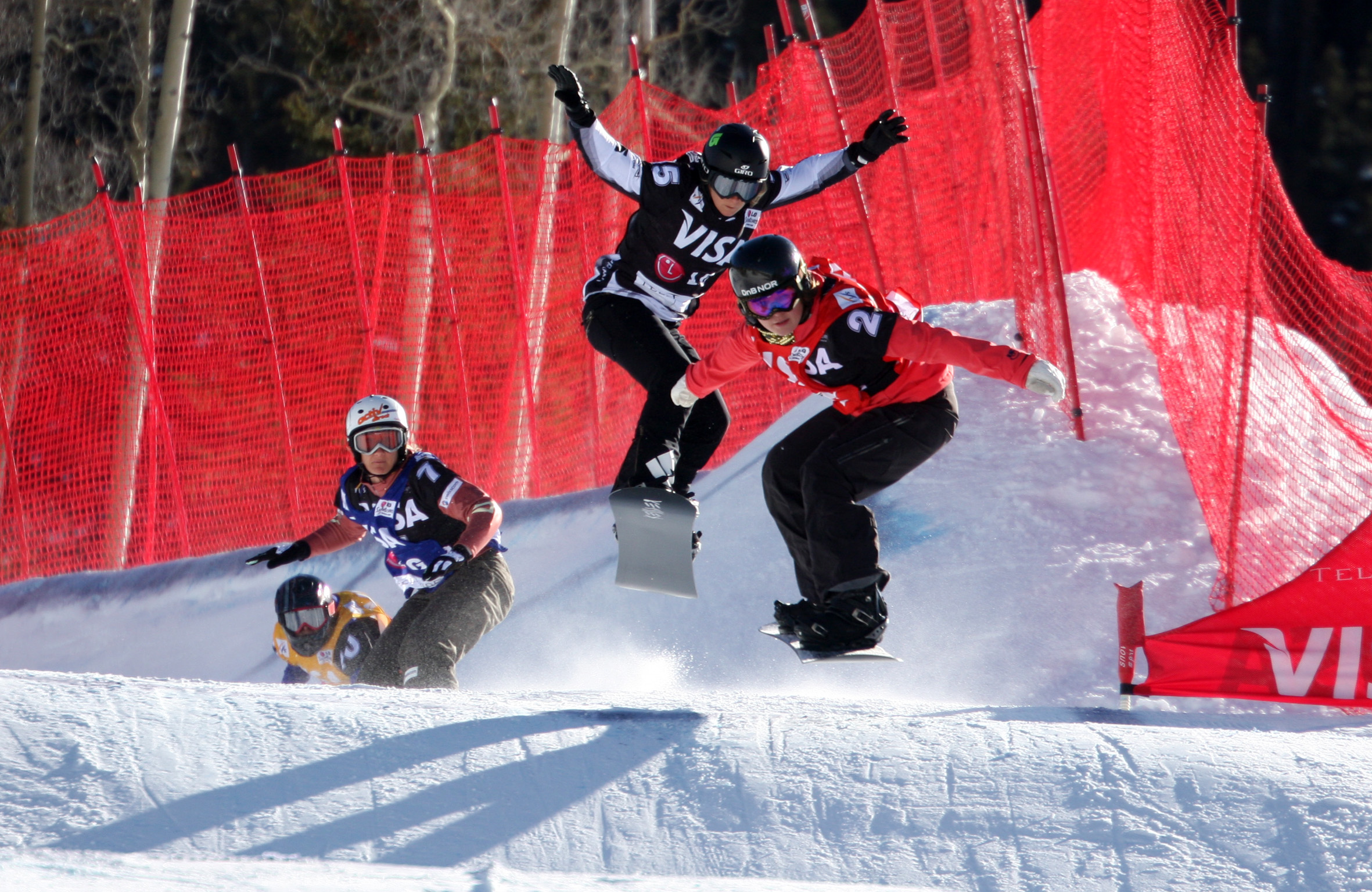
One of the quarterfinals in Telluride

Date	Place	Winner	Second	Third
September 12, 2009	Chapelco, Argentina	Maëlle Ricker (CAN)	Aleksandra Zhekova (BUL)	Dominique Maltais (CAN)
December 19, 2009	Telluride, United States	Maëlle Ricker (CAN)	Simona Meiller (SUI)	Dominique Maltais (CAN)
January 10, 2010	Bad Gastein, Austria	Lindsey Jacobellis (USA)	Helene Olafsen (NOR)	Sandra Frei (SUI)
January 15, 2010	Veysonnaz, Switzerland	Helene Olafsen (NOR)	Dominique Maltais (CAN)	Maëlle Ricker (CAN)
January 21, 2010	Stoneham, Canada	Maëlle Ricker (CAN)	Helene Olafsen (NOR)	Dominique Maltais (CAN)
March 11, 2010	Valmalenco, Italy	Lindsey Jacobellis (USA)	Maëlle Ricker (CAN)	Dominique Maltais (CAN)
March 18, 2010	La Molina, Spain	Helene Olafsen (NOR)	Simona Meiller (SUI)	Maëlle Ricker (CAN)

==== Halfpipe ====
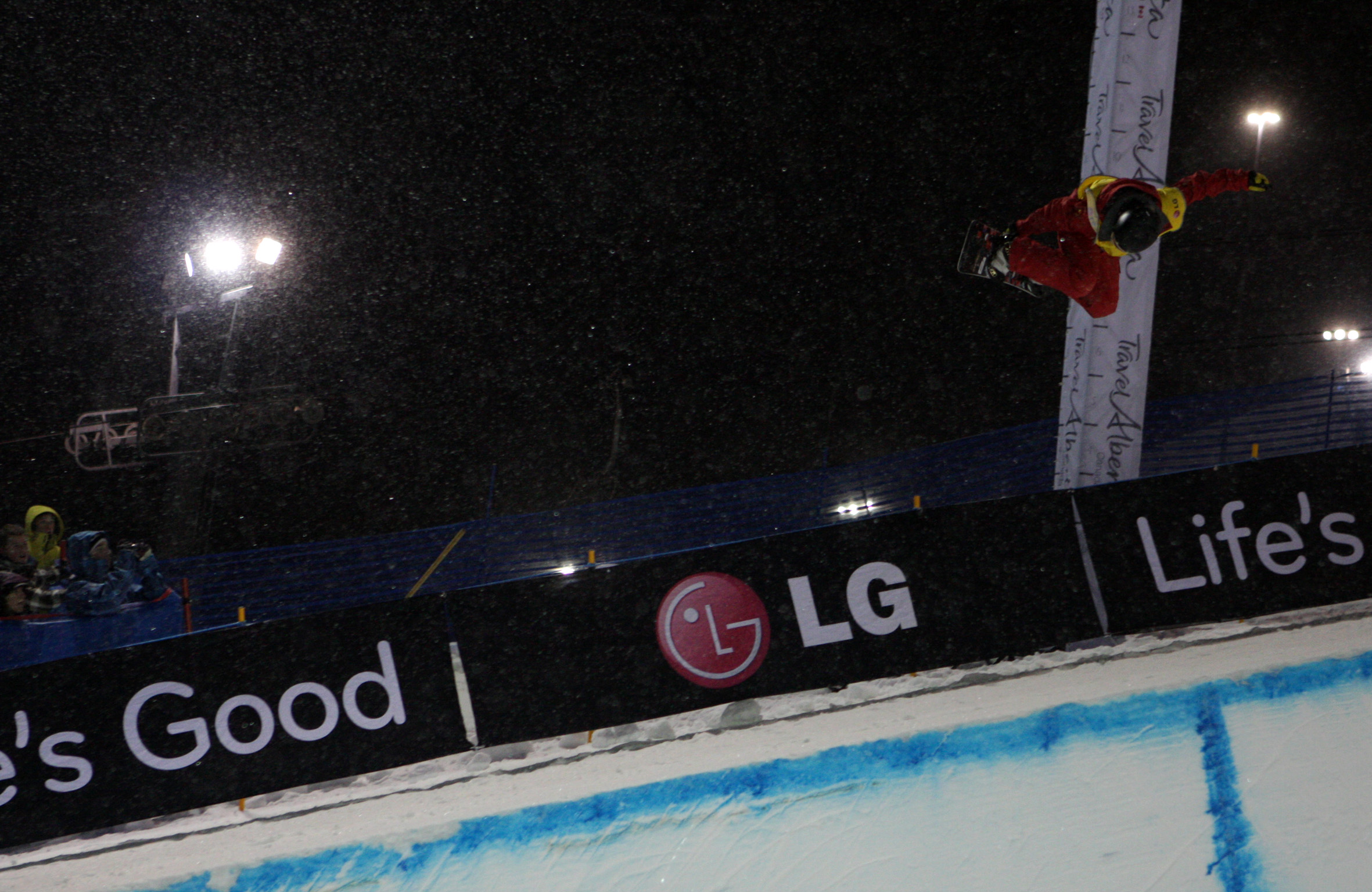
Cai Xuetong competing in Stoneham

Date	Place	Winner	Second	Third
August 25, 2009	Cardrona, New Zealand	Liu Jiayu (CHN)	Kelly Clark (USA)	Gretchen Bleiler (USA)
November 5, 2009	Saas-Fee, Switzerland	Torah Bright (AUS)	Cai Xuetong (CHN)	Sophie Rodriguez (FRA)
January 7, 2010	Kreischberg, Austria	Šárka Pančochová (CZE)	Sun Zhifeng (CHN)	Chen Xu (CHN)
January 22, 2010	Stoneham, Canada	Cai Xuetong (CHN)	Sun Zhifeng (CHN)	Chen Xu (CHN)
January 30, 2010	Calgary, Canada	Sun Zhifeng (CHN)	Cai Xuetong (CHN)	Holly Crawford (AUS)
March 14, 2010	Valmalenco, Italy	Holly Crawford (AUS)	Ursina Haller (SUI)	Mercedes Nicoll (CAN)
March 20, 2010	La Molina, Spain	Holly Crawford (AUS)	Mercedes Nicoll (CAN)	Paulina Ligocka (POL)

==== Slopestyle ====
The race was counted to the halfpipe World Cup score.

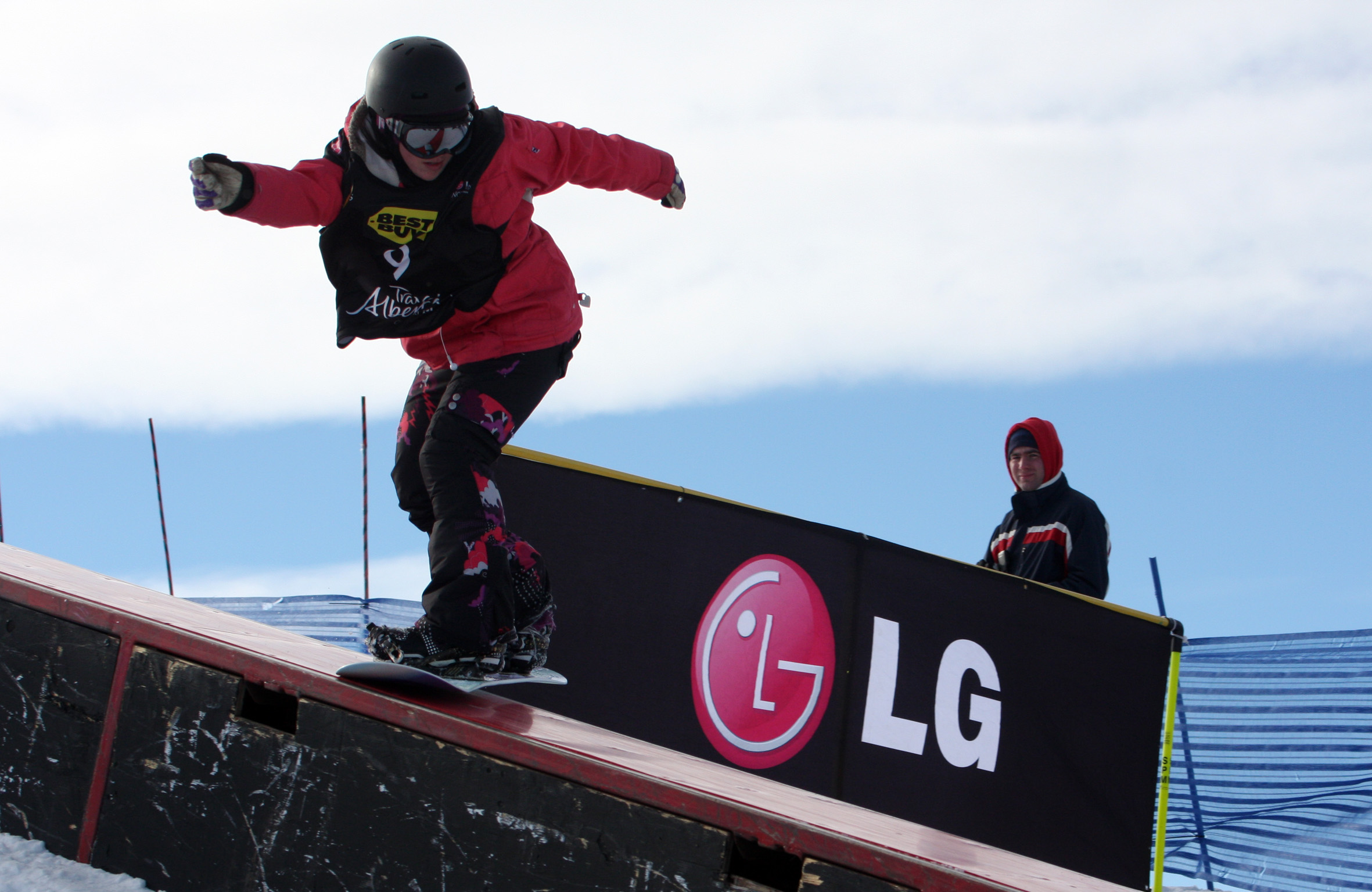
Marie-Andrée Racine competing in Calgary

Date	Place	Winner	Second	Third
January 31, 2010	Calgary, Canada	Sina Candrian (SUI)	Brooke Voigt (CAN)	Alexandra Duckworth (CAN)

== Standings ==
=== Overall Men ===
Pos	Athlete	Points
1.	Benjamin Karl (AUT)	7050
2.	Pierre Vaultier (FRA)	5800
3.	Andreas Prommegger (AUT)	5410
4.	Jasey Jay Anderson (CAN)	5250
5.	Stefan Gimpl (AUT)	4300
6.	Rok Flander (SLO)	3800
7.	Gian-Luca Cavigelli (SUI)	3320
8.	Janne Korpi (FIN)	3260
9.	Michael Lambert (CAN)	3200
10.	Alex Pullin (AUS)	3120

=== Overall Women ===
Pos	Athlete	Points
1.	Maëlle Ricker (CAN)	5290
2.	Nicolien Sauerbreij (NED)	5200
3.	Doris Guenther (AUT)	5110
4.	Helene Olafsen (NOR)	4710
5.	Fraenzi Maegert-Kohli (SUI)	4090
6.	Marion Kreiner (AUT)	3970
7.	Dominique Maltais (CAN)	3650
8.	Yekaterina Tudegesheva (RUS)	3500
9.	Amelie Kober (GER)	3470
10.	Claudia Riegler (AUT)	3415

=== Parallel slalom Men ===
Pos	Athlete	Points
1.	Benjamin Karl (AUT)	7050
2.	Andreas Prommegger (AUT)	5410
3.	Jasey-Jay Anderson (CAN)	5250
4.	Rok Flander (SLO)	3800
5.	Michael Lambert (CAN)	3200

=== Parallel slalom Women ===
Pos	Athlete	Points
1.	Nicolien Sauerbreij (NED)	5200
2.	Doris Guenther (AUT)	5110
3.	Fraenzi Maegert-Kohli (SUI)	4090
4.	Marion Kreiner (AUT)	3970
5.	Yekaterina Tudegesheva (RUS)	3500

=== Snowboardcross Men ===
Pos	Athlete	Points
1.	Pierre Vaultier (FRA)	5800
2.	Alex Pullin (AUS)	3120
3.	Graham Watanabe (USA)	2860
4.	Nate Holland (USA)	2240
5.	Nick Baumgartner (USA)	2090

=== Snowboardcross Women ===
Pos	Athlete	Points
1.	Maëlle Ricker (CAN)	5000
2.	Helene Olafsen (NOR)	4710
3.	Dominique Maltais (CAN)	3650
4.	Lindsey Jacobellis (USA)	3250
5.	Simona Meiler (SUI)	3010

=== Halfpipe Men ===
Pos	Athlete	Points
1.	Justin Lamoureux (CAN)	2400
2.	Janne Korpi (FIN)	1730
3.	Christophe Schmidt (GER)	1690
4.	Patrick Burgener (SUI)	1639
5.	Kazuhiro Kokubo (JPN)	1600

=== Halfpipe Women ===
Pos	Athlete	Points
1.	Cai Xuetong (CHN)	3040
2.	Sun Zhifeng (CHN)	2805
3.	Holly Crawford (AUS)	2600
4.	Mercedes Nicoll (CAN)	2530
5.	Chen Xu (CHN)	1840

=== Big Air ===
Pos	Athlete	Points
1.	Stefan Gimpl (AUT)	4300
2.	Gian-Luca Cavigelli (SUI)	3320
3.	Matevz Pristavec (SLO)	1620
4.	Janne Korpi (FIN)	1530
5.	Gjermund Braaten (NOR)	1460

== Medal table ==
Rank	Nation	Gold	Silver	Bronze	Total
1	Canada	9	10	13	32
2	Austria	8	13	10	31
3	France	6	4	3	13
4	United States	4	3	6	13
5	Australia	4	1	1	6
6	Russia	4	1	0	5
7	Switzerland	3	7	5	15
8	China	3	4	2	9
9	Norway	3	3	3	9
10	Germany	2	3	0	5
11	Netherlands	2	2	0	4
12	Finland	2	0	4	6
13	Japan	2	0	1	3
14	Poland	1	0	2	3
15	Italy	1	0	1	2
16	Czech Republic	1	0	0	1
17	Slovenia	0	2	2	4
18	Belgium	0	1	0	1
18	Bulgaria	0	1	0	1
20	Great Britain	0	0	1	1
20	New Zealand	0	0	1	1
Totals (21 entries)		55	55	55	165
