= Snowboarding at the 2017 Asian Winter Games – Women's halfpipe =

Women's halfpipe at the 2017 Asian Winter Games
- Venue: Bankei Ski Area
- Dates: 25 February 2017
- Competitors: 11 from 4 nations

Medalists
| gold medal | Liu Jiayu | China |
| silver medal | Cai Xuetong | China |
| bronze medal | Kurumi Imai | Japan |

The women's snowboard halfpipe competition at the 2017 Asian Winter Games in Sapporo, Japan was held on 25 February at the Bankei Ski Area.

== Schedule ==
All times are Japan Standard Time (UTC+09:00)

| Date | Time | Event |
|---|---|---|
| Saturday, 25 February 2017 | 10:30 | Qualification |
| Saturday, 25 February 2017 | 13:30 | Final |

== Results ==
Legend

- DNS — Did not start

=== Qualification ===
| Rank | Athlete | Run 1 | Run 2 | Best |
|---|---|---|---|---|
| 1 | Liu Jiayu (CHN) | 18.75 | 89.25 | 89.25 |
| 2 | Haruna Matsumoto (JPN) | 88.25 | 74.00 | 88.25 |
| 3 | Kurumi Imai (JPN) | 82.25 | 27.50 | 82.25 |
| 4 | Sena Tomita (JPN) | 80.75 | 14.00 | 80.75 |
| 5 | Holly Crawford (AUS) | 54.50 | 69.75 | 69.75 |
| 6 | Qiu Leng (CHN) | 12.00 | 68.25 | 68.25 |
| 7 | Cai Xuetong (CHN) | 65.50 | 26.00 | 65.50 |
| 8 | Li Shuang (CHN) | 59.00 | 6.25 | 59.00 |
| 9 | Kwon Sun-oo (KOR) | 46.50 | 21.75 | 46.50 |
| 10 | Jeong Yu-rim (KOR) | 45.00 | 42.75 | 45.00 |
| — | Hikaru Oe (JPN) | | | DNS |

=== Final ===
| Rank | Athlete | Run 1 | Run 2 | Best |
|---|---|---|---|---|
| 1st place, gold medalist(s) | Liu Jiayu (CHN) | 93.00 | 35.25 | 93.00 |
| 2nd place, silver medalist(s) | Cai Xuetong (CHN) | 77.50 | 78.50 | 78.50 |
| 3rd place, bronze medalist(s) | Kurumi Imai (JPN) | 73.00 | 20.25 | 73.00 |
| 4 | Haruna Matsumoto (JPN) | 68.75 | 21.00 | 68.75 |
| 5 | Li Shuang (CHN) | 64.25 | 67.25 | 67.25 |
| 6 | Qiu Leng (CHN) | 30.50 | 62.50 | 62.50 |
| 7 | Holly Crawford (AUS) | 55.25 | 60.25 | 60.25 |
| 8 | Kwon Sun-oo (KOR) | 48.50 | 50.50 | 50.50 |
| 9 | Jeong Yu-rim (KOR) | 41.75 | 13.25 | 13.25 |
| 10 | Sena Tomita (JPN) | 21.50 | 31.00 | 31.00 |
