= 2013–14 FIS Snowboard World Cup =

International snowboarding competition

Snowboard World Cup 2013/14
Discipline	Men	Women
Parallel overall	(Austria) Lukas Mathies	(Switzerland) Patrizia Kummer
Freestyle overall	(Sweden) Måns Hedberg	(Czech Republic) Šárka Pančochová
Snowboard cross	(Italy) Omar Visintin	(Canada) Dominique Maltais
Halfpipe	(Australia) Scotty James	(United States) Kelly Clark
Slopestyle	(Sweden) Måns Hedberg	(Czech Republic) Šárka Pančochová
Big Air	(Finland) Petja Piiroinen	–

Competition
Locations	14	14
Individual	20	19
Team	1	1

The 2013–14 FIS Snowboard World Cup is a multi race tournament over a season for snowboarding. The World Cup was organised by the FIS which also runs world cups and championships in alpine skiing, cross-country skiing, ski jumping, Nordic combined, and freestyle skiing. The FIS Snowboarding World Cup consisted of the parallel slalom, snowboard cross and the halfpipe. The men's side of the world cup also consisted of a big air competition.

== Calendar: Men ==
=== Parallel ===
Date	Place	Event	Winner	Second	Third	Det.
13 Dec 2013	(Italy) Carezza	GS	Anton Unterkofler (AUT)	Žan Košir (SLO)	Lukas Mathies (AUT)	
14 Dec 2013	(Italy) Carezza	SL	Sylvain Dufour (FRA)	Alexander Payer (AUT)	Lukas Mathies (AUT)	
10 Jan 2014	(Austria) Bad Gastein	SL	Alexander Bergmann (GER)	Andreas Prommegger (AUT)	Aaron March (ITA)	
12 Jan 2014	(Austria) Bad Gastein	SL	Vic Wild (RUS)	Žan Košir (SLO)	Simon Schoch (SUI)	
18 Jan 2014	(Slovenia) Rogla	GS	Lukas Mathies (AUT)	Žan Košir (SLO)	Sylvain Dufour (FRA)	
1 Feb 2014	(Germany) Sudelfeld	GS	Sylvain Dufour (FRA)	Lukas Mathies (AUT)	Justin Reiter (USA)	

=== Snowboard Cross ===
Date	Place	Event	Winner	Second	Third	Det.
7 Dec 2013	(Austria) Montafon	SBX	Markus Schairer (AUT)	Omar Visintin (ITA)	Kevin Hill (CAN)	
8 Dec 2013	(Austria) Montafon (Team)	SBX	Konstantin Schad (GER); Paul Berg (GER)	Kevin Hill (CAN); Jake Holden (CAN)	Luca Matteotti (ITA); Michele Godino (ITA)	
21 Dec 2013	(Canada) Lake Louise	SBX	Jarryd Hughes (AUS)	Konstantin Schad (GER)	Alex Deibold (USA)	
11 Jan 2014	(Andorra) Vallnord-Arcalís	SBX	Trevor Jacob (USA)	Stian Sivertzen (NOR)	Omar Visintin (ITA)	
12 Jan 2014	(Andorra) Vallnord-Arcalís	SBX	Omar Visintin (ITA)	Lucas Eguibar (ESP)	Luca Matteotti (ITA)	
11 Mar 2014	(Switzerland) Veysonnaz	SBX	Fabio Cordi (ITA)	Anton Lindfors (FIN)	Chris Robanske (CAN)	
11 Mar 2014	(Switzerland) Veysonnaz (Team)	SBX	cancelled			
15 Mar 2014	(Spain) La Molina	SBX	Paul Berg (GER)	Nikolay Olyunin (RUS)	Regino Hernández (ESP)	

cancelled in 17–19 January due to lack of snow; rescheduled to March.

=== Half-pipe ===
Date	Place	Event	Winner	Second	Third	Det.
24 Aug 2013	(New Zealand) Cardrona	HP	Ayumu Hirano (JPN)	Taku Hiraoka (JPN)	Christian Haller (SUI)	
13 Dec 2013	(Finland) Ruka	HP	Janne Korpi (FIN)	Johann Baisamy (FRA)	Markus Malin (FIN)	
21 Dec 2013	(United States) Copper Mountain	HP	Taylor Gold (USA)	Greg Bretz (USA)	Ben Ferguson (USA)	
18 Jan 2014	(Canada) Stoneham	HP	Ryō Aono (JPN)	Jan Scherrer (SUI)	Scott James (AUS)	

=== Slopestyle ===
Date	Place	Event	Winner	Second	Third	Det.
19 Aug 2013	(New Zealand) Cardrona	SBS	cancelled			
22 Dec 2013	(United States) Copper Mountain	SBS	Ståle Sandbech (NOR)	Torstein Horgmo (NOR)	Shaun White (USA)	
19 Jan 2014	(Canada) Stoneham	SBS	Maxence Parrot (CAN)	Niklas Mattsson (SWE)	Torgeir Bergrem (NOR)	
6 Mar 2014	(Austria) Kreischberg	SBS	Måns Hedberg (SWE)	Petja Piiroinen (FIN)	Philipp Kundratitz (AUT)	

=== Big Air ===
Date	Place	Event	Winner	Second	Third	Det.
17 Jan 2014	(Canada) Stoneham	BA	Petja Piiroinen (FIN)	Måns Hedberg (SWE)	Antoine Truchon (CAN)	

== Ladies ==
=== Parallel ===
Date	Place	Classification	Winner	Second	Third	Report
December 13, 2013	(Italy) Carezza	Giant Slalom	Patrizia Kummer (SUI)	Tomoka Takeuchi (JPN)	Ekaterina Tudegesheva (RUS)	
December 14, 2013	(Italy) Carezza	Slalom	Caroline Calvé (CAN)	Yekaterina Tudegesheva (RUS)	Selina Jörg (GER)	
January 10, 2014	(Austria) Bad Gastein	Slalom	Patrizia Kummer (SUI)	Ester Ledecká (CZE)	Marion Kreiner (AUT)	
January 12, 2014	(Austria) Bad Gastein	Slalom	Patrizia Kummer (SUI)	Julia Dujmovits (AUT)	Ester Ledecká (CZE)	
January 18, 2014	(Slovenia) Rogla	Giant Slalom	Ester Ledecká (CZE)	Tomoka Takeuchi (JPN)	Julia Dujmovits (AUT)	
February 1, 2014	(Germany) Sudelfeld	Giant Slalom	Patrizia Kummer (SUI)	Tomoka Takeuchi (JPN)	Julia Dujmovits (AUT)	

=== Snowboard Cross ===
Date	Place	Winner	Second	Third	Report
December 7, 2013	(Austria) Montafon	Eva Samková (CZE)	Dominique Maltais (CAN)	Helene Olafsen (NOR)	
December 8, 2013	(Austria) Montafon (Team)	Raffaella Brutto (ITA); Michela Moioli (ITA)	Lindsey Jacobellis (USA); Callan Chythlook-Sifsof (USA)	Chloe Trespeuch (FRA); Nelly Moenne Loccoz (FRA)	
December 21, 2013	(Canada) Lake Louise	Lindsey Jacobellis (USA)	Dominique Maltais (CAN)	Helene Olafsen (NOR)	
January 11, 2014	(Andorra) Vallnord-Arcalís	Dominique Maltais (CAN)	Aleksandra Zhekova (BUL)	Lindsey Jacobellis (USA)	
January 12, 2014	(Andorra) Vallnord-Arcalís	Eva Samková (CZE)	Dominique Maltais (CAN)	Lindsey Jacobellis (USA)	
March 11, 2014	(Switzerland) Veysonnaz	Dominique Maltais (CAN)	Nelly Moenne Loccoz (FRA)	Aleksandra Zhekova (BUL)	
March 11, 2014	(Switzerland) Veysonnaz (Team)	cancelled, not rescheduled			
March 15, 2014	(Spain) La Molina	Dominique Maltais (CAN)	Lindsey Jacobellis (USA)	Raffaella Brutto (ITA)	

cancelled in 17–19 January due to lack of snow; rescheduled to March.

=== Half-pipe ===
Date	Place	Winner	Second	Third	Report
August 24, 2013	(New Zealand) Cardrona	Kelly Clark (USA)	Cai Xuetong (CHN)	Gretchen Bleiler (USA)	
December 13, 2013	(Finland) Ruka	Li Shuang (CHN)	Rebecca Sinclair (NZL)	Clemence Grimal (FRA)	
December 21, 2013	(United States) Copper Mountain	Kelly Clark (USA)	Arielle Gold (USA)	Gretchen Bleiler (USA)	
January 18, 2014	(Canada) Stoneham	Rana Okada (JPN)	Yuki Furihata (JPN)	Hikaru Ōe (JPN)	

=== Slopestyle ===
Date	Place	Winner	Second	Third	Report
August 19, 2013	(New Zealand) Cardrona	Jamie Anderson (USA)	Jenny Jones (GBR)	Cheryl Maas (NED)	
December 22, 2013	(United States) Copper Mountain	Šárka Pančochová (CZE)	Isabel Derungs (SUI)	Elena Könz (SUI)	
January 19, 2014	(Canada) Stoneham	Christy Prior (NZL)	Cheryl Maas (NED)	Anna Gasser (AUT)	
March 6, 2014	(Austria) Kreischberg	Šárka Pančochová (CZE)	Henna Ikola (FIN)	Klaudia Medlova (SVK)	

== Standings ==
=== Freestyle Overall Men ===
Rank		Points
1	Måns Hedberg (SWE)	2260
2	Petja Piiroinen (FIN)	2060
3	Scotty James (AUS)	1980
4	Maxence Parrot (CAN)	1620
5	Johann Baisamy (FRA)	1362

=== Freestyle Overall Women ===
Rank		Points
1	Šárka Pančochová (CZE)	2720
2	Kelly Clark (USA)	2000
3	Cheryl Maas (NED)	1800
4	Rebecca Sinclair (NZL)	1840
5	Rana Okada (JPN)	1620

=== Parallel Men ===
Rank		Points
1	Lukas Mathies (AUT)	3740
2	Sylvain Dufour (FRA)	3500
3	Žan Košir (SLO)	2850
4	Vic Wild (RUS)	2285
5	Nevin Galmarini (SUI)	2020

=== Parallel Women ===
Rank		Points
1	Patrizia Kummer (SUI)	4800
2	Ester Ledecka (CZE)	3700
3	Julia Dujmovits (AUT)	2730
4	Ekaterina Tudegesheva (RUS)	2540
5	Tomoka Takeuchi (JPN)	2526

=== Snowboard Cross Men ===
Rank		Points
1	Omar Visintin (ITA)	3076
2	Paul Berg (GER)	2150
3	Christopher Robanske (CAN)	2120
4	Jarryd Hughes (AUS)	2090
5	Konstantin Schad (GER)	2074

=== Snowboard Cross Women ===
Rank		Points
1	Dominique Maltais (CAN)	5400
2	Lindsey Jacobellis (USA)	3760
3	Alexandra Jekova (BUL)	2850
4	Yoka Fujimori (JPN)	2450
5	Eva Samkova (CZE)	2430

=== Halfpipe Men ===
Rank		Points
1	Scotty James (AUS)	1400
2	Johann Baisamy (FRA)	1362
3	Ryo Aono (JPN)	1258
4	Greg Bretz (USA)	1250
4	Taku Hiraoka (JPN)	1250

=== Halfpipe Women ===
Rank		Points
1	Kelly Clark (USA)	2000
2	Rebecca Sinclair (NZL)	1640
3	Rana Okada (JPN)	1520
4	Li Shuang (CHN)	1380
5	Yuki Furihata (NZL)	1330

=== Slopestyle Men ===
Rank		Points
1	Måns Hedberg (SWE)	1460
2	Maxence Parrot (CAN)	1120
3	Petja Piiroinen (FIN)	1060
4	Ståle Sandbech (NOR)	1000
5	Niklas Mattsson (SWE)	840

=== Slopestyle Women ===
Rank		Points
1	Šárka Pančochová (CZE)	2500
2	Cheryl Maas (NED)	1800
3	Christy Prior (NZL)	1379
4	Jamie Anderson (USA)	1360
5	Anna Gasser (AUT)	1119

== Podium table by nation ==
Rank	Nation	Gold	Silver	Bronze	Total
1	United States	6	4	8	18
2	Canada	5	4	3	12
3	Czech Republic	5	1	1	7
4	Switzerland	4	2	3	9
5	Japan	3	5	1	9
6	Austria	3	4	7	14
7	Italy	3	1	5	9
8	Germany	3	1	1	5
9	Finland	2	3	1	6
10	France	2	2	3	7
11	Norway	1	2	3	6
12	Russia	1	2	1	4
13	Sweden	1	2	0	3
14	China	1	1	0	2
14	New Zealand	1	1	0	2
16	Australia	1	0	1	2
17	Slovenia	0	3	0	3
18	Bulgaria	0	1	1	2
18	Netherlands	0	1	1	2
18	Spain	0	1	1	2
21	Great Britain	0	1	0	1
22	Slovakia	0	0	1	1
Totals (22 entries)		42	42	42	126
