= Kaitlyn Farrington =

American former professional snowboarder

Personal information
- Full name: Kaitlyn Farrington Clark
- Born: Kaitlyn Brooke Farrington; December 18, 1989 (age 36) Hailey, Idaho, U.S.
- Height: 5 ft 4 in (163 cm)

Sport
- Coached by: Elijah Teter
Medal record
Women's snowboarding
Representing United States
Olympic Games
Gold medal – first place	2014 Sochi	Halfpipe
Winter X Games
Silver medal – second place	2011 Aspen	SuperPipe
Bronze medal – third place	2014 Aspen	SuperPipe

Kaitlyn Brooke Farrington (born December 18, 1989) is an American former professional snowboarder and amateur freestyle snowmobiler who grew up on a cattle ranch near Bellevue, Idaho, and now lives in Whitefish, Montana. She won the gold medal in the women's half-pipe competition at the 2014 Winter Olympics in Sochi, Russia. Prior to her Olympic debut, she competed in the 2010 European Winter X Games and won the gold medal. On December 8, 2022, Farrington was announced as a backup crew member of the dearMoon project, a now-canceled lunar spaceflight mission.

== Early life ==
Farrington was born to parents Gary and Suz Farrington; she has an older sister. The Farringtons own a ranch near Sun Valley, Idaho, and Kaitlyn grew up riding horses. Suz Farrington credited her daughter's smooth style with good balance from riding horses. She was skiing by age three and barrel racing at age five. "She was skiing on a tether for two days, then said, 'I'm done with this stuff,'" remembered Mr. Farrington.

By high school, Farrington was competing as a snowboarder, and her parents had to sell the cows on their ranch to pay for expenses.

== Career ==
Farrington is left-handed and uses a goofy stance. She became the first women's rider to perform a backside 1080. She goes about 9 feet high above the edge of the half-pipe, but considers herself as a more technical rider in order to make up for her height. Farrington has had five wrist surgeries.

- 2014 Sochi Olympic Games - Half pipe women - gold medalist
- 2013 FIS Snowboarding World Championships – Women's halfpipe, 4th place, behind Arielle Gold, Holly Crawford, and Sophie Rodriguez.
- 2013 World Cup Sochi, 5th place
- 2013 World Cup Park City, bronze medalist
- 2013 World Cup Copper Mountain, 5th place
- 2012 U.S. Grand Prix overall champion
- 2012 Dew Tour Breckenridge, gold medalist
- 2011 X Games Aspen, silver medalist
- 2011 Dew Tour, silver medalist
- 2010 X Games Europe, gold medalist
- 2010 Dew Tour, overall champion
- 2008 Junior World Championships, silver medalist

On January 16, 2015, Farrington announced via Instagram of her retirement from professional snowboarding at only 25 years of age. In October 2014, Farrington was involved in a fall in Austria while trying to execute a frontside 360 off a small jump. Once returning home to Salt Lake City, Farrington went to get an MRI, to find that she had been diagnosed with congenital cervical stenosis, a congenital spine condition. Doctors told her that competitive snowboarding would put her at great risk of extreme injury due to the condition. Farrington has said "I can walk. I can still snowboard, I just have to keep my feet on the ground".

She was accepted as a backup crewmember for the dearMoon project. Following launch vehicle delays, dearMoon was cancelled in 2024.

== Personal life ==
Farrington has a cat named Zilla, after Godzilla. She collects refrigerator magnets from her travel stops and loves running and music. Farrington said she was listening to Ghostland Observatory's Give Me The Beat when competing in the 2014 Winter Olympics in Sochi, Russia.

She recently picked up Frisbee golf and tries to surf, which she calls "drowning".

A black diamond run on Sun Valley's Bald Mountain was renamed "Kaitlyn's Bowl" in her honor.
