= Queralt Castellet =

Spanish snowboarder (born 1989)

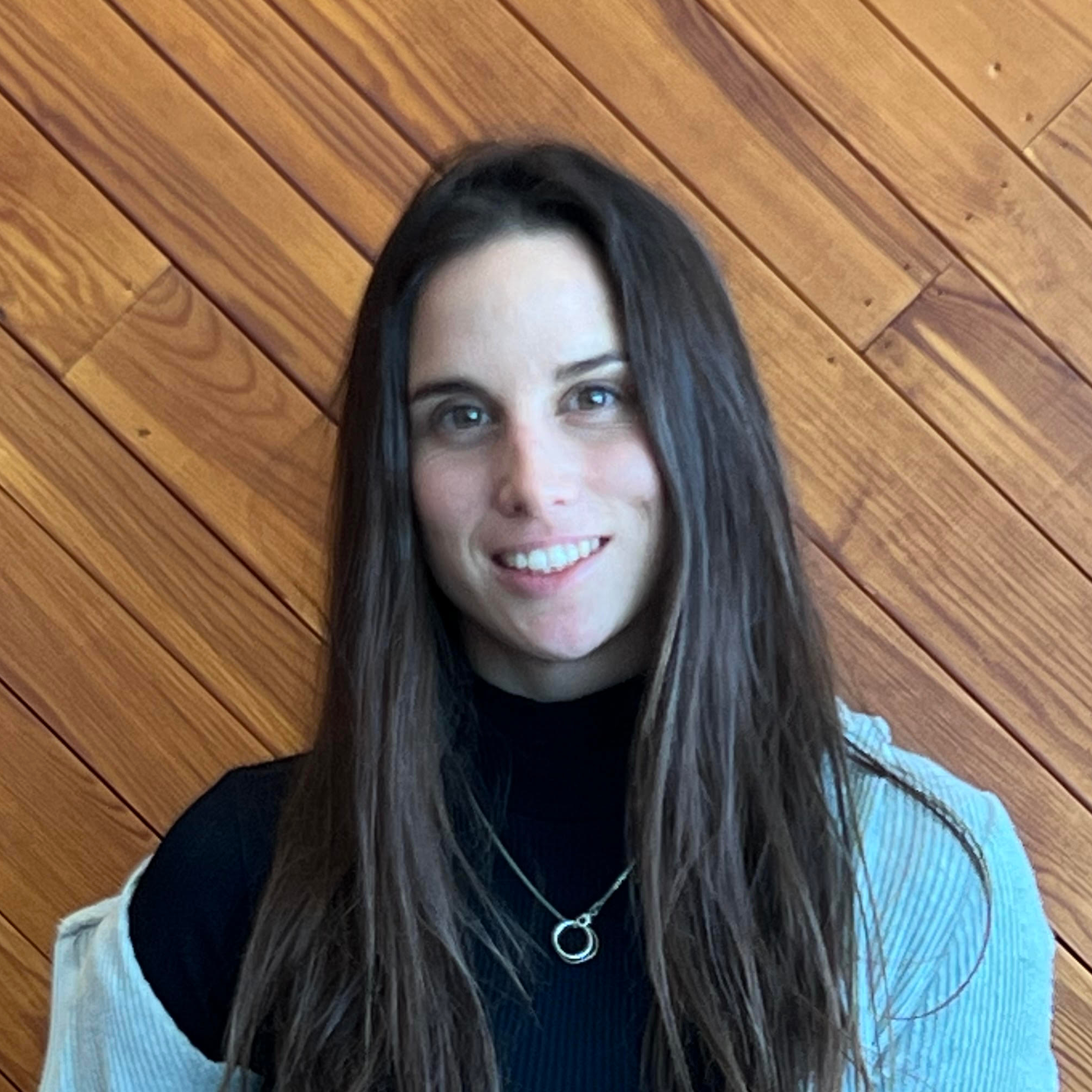
- Queralt Castellet (2022)

Personal information
- Nationality: Spanish
- Born: 17 June 1989 (age 37) Sabadell, Spain
- Height: 1.56 m (5 ft 1 in)
- Weight: 52 kg (115 lb)

Sport
- Country: Spain
- Sport: Snowboarding
- Event: Halfpipe
Medal record
Women's snowboarding
Representing Spain
Olympic Games
Silver medal – second place	2022 Beijing	Halfpipe
World Championships
Silver medal – second place	2015 Kreischberg	Halfpipe
Bronze medal – third place	2021 Aspen	Halfpipe
Winter X Games
Gold medal – first place	2020 Aspen	Superpipe
Silver medal – second place	2019 Aspen	Superpipe
Silver medal – second place	2022 Aspen	Superpipe
Bronze medal – third place	2011 Tignes	Superpipe
Winter Universiade
Silver medal – second place	2015 Granada	Halfpipe

Queralt Castellet Ibáñez (born 17 June 1989) is a Spanish snowboarder. She won a silver medal in the women's halfpipe at the 2022 Winter Olympics in Beijing, making her the first Spanish woman to win an Olympic medal at a Winter Olympics for 30 years. She was a silver medalist at the 2015 World Championships.

== Life and career ==
Castellet was born in Sabadell. She states that although she lived in the city, her parents would take her to the mountains every weekend as they enjoyed camping. She began snowboarding at age 6 after her parents had discovered it four years prior. She also participated in gymnastics, but was forced to stop at age 16 after fracturing her wrist while snowboarding. This prompted her to move to the Pyrenees to snowboard more frequently. As a teenager she competed at the 2006 Winter Olympics, and finished tenth in halfpipe at the 2007 World Snowboard Championships. During the 2007-08 Snowboarding World Cup circuit she placed on the podium three times, and overall she placed third in the halfpipe section of the 2007–08 World Cup.

At the 2010 Winter Olympics she scored a 44.3 on her first qualifying run, third highest. However, she suffered a concussion while practicing in the lead-up to the final and was subsequently forced to withdraw.

At the World Cup, she has seven victories, and ten additional podiums in halfpipe, and another podium in big air.

She won silver in the women's halfpipe at the 2022 Winter Olympics in Beijing, her fifth Olympic Games.

== Personal ==
Castellet currently lives in New Zealand.

== Olympic results ==
Season	Date	Location	Discipline	Place
2006	13 February 2006	Turin, Italy	Halfpipe	26th
2010	18 February 2010	Vancouver, Canada	Halfpipe	12th
2014	12 February 2014	Sochi, Russia	Halfpipe	11th
2018	13 February 2018	Pyeongchang, South Korea	Halfpipe	7th
2022	9 February 2022	Beijing, China	Halfpipe	2nd
2026	12 February 2026	Milan, Italy	Halfpipe	10th

== World championships results ==
Season	Date	Location	Discipline	Place
2007	20 January 2007	Arosa, Switzerland	Halfpipe	10th
2009	23 January 2009	Gangwon, South Korea	Halfpipe	6th
2013	20 January 2013	Stoneham, Canada	Halfpipe	5th
2015	17 January 2015	Kreischberg, Austria	Halfpipe	2nd
2017	11 March 2017	Sierra Nevada, Spain	Halfpipe	11th
2017	17 March 2017	Sierra Nevada, Spain	Big air	10th
2019	8 February 2019	Park City, United States	Halfpipe	4th
2021	13 March 2021	Aspen, United States	Halfpipe	3rd
2023	3 March 2023	(Georgia (country)) Bakuriani, Georgia	Halfpipe	23rd

== World Cup podiums (19) ==
Season	Date	Location	Discipline	Place
2008	27 January 2008	Bardonecchia, Italy	Halfpipe	2nd
2008	9 March 2008	Stoneham, Canada	Halfpipe	3rd
2008	16 March 2008	Valmalenco, Italy	Halfpipe	2nd
2011	26 March 2011	Arosa, Switzerland	Halfpipe	1st
2012	3 November 2011	Saas-Fee, Switzerland	Halfpipe	1st
2013	26 August 2012	Cardrona, New Zealand	Halfpipe	3rd
2013	12 January 2013	(United States) Copper Mountain, USA	Halfpipe	3rd
2016	13 February 2016	Quebec, Canada	Big air	3rd
2018	13 January 2018	(United States) Snowmass, USA	Halfpipe	1st
2018	20 January 2018	Laax, Switzerland	Halfpipe	3rd
2019	19 January 2019	Laax, Switzerland	Halfpipe	2nd
2019	15 February 2019	Calgary, Canada	Halfpipe	1st
2020	14 December 2019	(United States) Copper Mountain, USA	Halfpipe	1st
2020	18 January 2020	Laax, Switzerland	Halfpipe	1st
2021	21 March 2021	(United States) Aspen, USA	Halfpipe	2nd
2022	11 December 2021	(United States) Copper Mountain, USA	Halfpipe	3rd
2022	15 January 2022	Laax, Switzerland	Halfpipe	3rd
2023	16 December 2022	(United States) Copper Mountain, USA	Halfpipe	1st
2026	28 March 2026	Silvaplana, Switzerland	Halfpipe	3rd
