= Michael Lambert (snowboarder) =

Canadian snowboarder (born 1986)

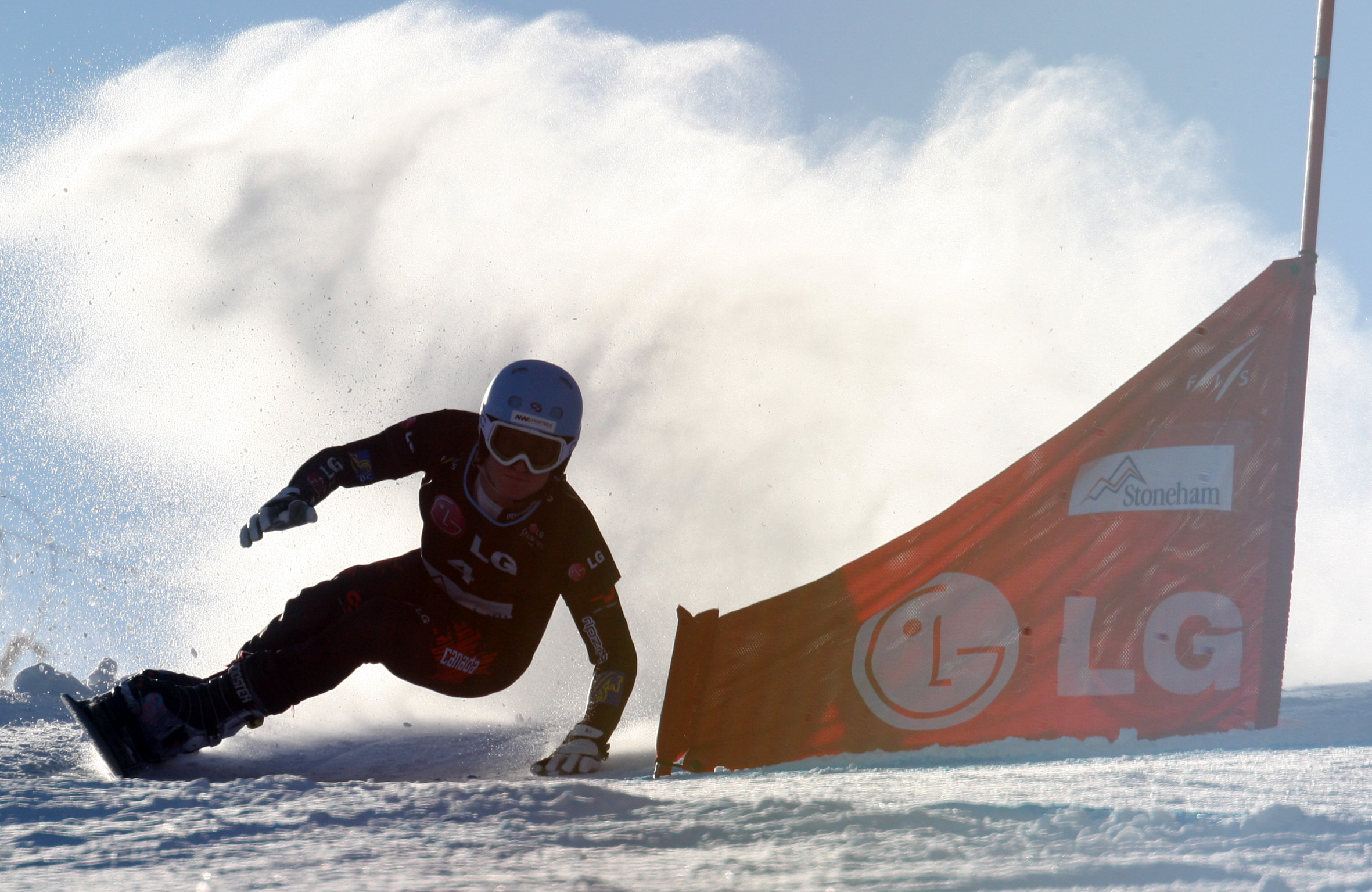

Personal information
- Nicknames: Bone, Lambone, Lambo, Fancy
- Born: June 25, 1986 (age 40) Toronto, Ontario, Canada

Sport
- Sport: Alpine Snowboarder
Medal record
----
FIS Snowboarding Junior World Championships
Silver medal – second place	2006 Vivaldi Park	Parallel GS

Michael Lambert (born June 25, 1986) is a Canadian snowboarder who currently resides in Toronto, Ontario. Michael competes in the Alpine disciplines, Parallel GS and Parallel Slalom. Lambert has been on the Canadian National Team since 2002 and is currently working with coaches Mark Fawcett and Sylvain Jean. He is also the Slap cup champion of Stoney island

== Personal ==
Michael was featured in the MTV Canada series 'Summer Sessions' alongside fellow national riders like Jasey-Jay Anderson, and Matthew Morison. He also featured in the follow-up MTV show Over the Bolts which followed the Canadian national team over the season. Lambert was one of the shows featured team members and closely followed him as well as his close friendship with Kimiko Zakreski. The show featured Lambert's frustration with his results on the world cup season. Michael's relationship with Nina Mićić, a Serbian snowboarder and fellow world cup tour member on the women's side is also televised on the show.

== Career ==
=== Junior ===
Michael achieved his first success with the national team winning a silver medal at the 2006 FIS Junior Snowboarding World Championships in the parallel slalom, an event where teammate Matthew Morison finished 5th.

Lambert also competed in the Nor-Am cup, the Nor-Am Cup is a competition held in the United States as well as Canada. It is known for being a square one for younger athletes to compete and make a name for themselves before making the national team on the World Cup and going to the World Championships. According to the International Ski Federation, Lambert placed first in the 2006 Nor-Am Cup in Mt. St.-Louis/Moonstone Canada, for the Parallel Slalom event while bringing in third place in the Parallel Giant Slalom. The previous year Lambert came in second place in both Mount Norquay in Alberta, Canada and Squaw, California for the Parallel Giant Slalom.

=== FIS World Cups ===
Lambert achieved his first success on the world cup tour in the 2009–10 season when he finished second in the race at Telluride, Michael had finished 6th on the Telluride slopes only two days earlier. Lambert lost the final to teammate and world champion Jasey-Jay Anderson. On January 17, 2010 Lambert won his first world cup gold medal in Nendaz, Switzerland. With the gold Lambert now has two career world cup podiums in addition to his second-place finish at Telluride, Colorado earlier in the 09–10 season.

=== Vancouver 2010 Olympics ===
Lambert was a member of team Canada at the 2010 Winter Olympics in Vancouver.

=== Sochi 2014 Olympics ===
Lambert failed to qualify for the Men's Parallel Giant Slalom, coming in 27th (second to last). Lambert expressed his displeasure in the Sochi games, which was received with mixed responses.
