= Joanna Zając =

Polish snowboarder (born 1990)

Personal information
- Nationality: Polish
- Born: 13 September 1990 (age 34); Limanowa, Poland

Sport
- Sport: Snowboarding

Joanna Zając (born 13 September 1990) is a Polish snowboarder. She was born in Limanowa. She competed in halfpipe at the FIS Snowboarding World Championships 2013. She competed at the 2014 Winter Olympics in Sochi, in halfpipe.
