= Morena Makar =

Croatian snowboarder

Personal information
- Born: 22 January 1985 (age 41) Zagreb, Yugoslavia

Sport
- Sport: Skiing

Morena Makar (born 22 January 1985 in Zagreb) is a Croatian snowboarder, specializing in halfpipe. In 2014, she became the first snowboarder to represent Croatia at the Winter Olympics

Makar competed at the 2014 Winter Olympics for Croatia. In the halfpipe, she finished 24th in the qualifying round, failing to advance.

As of September 2014 her best showing at the World Championships is 21st, in the 2013 halfpipe.

Makar made her World Cup debut in January 2004. As of September 2014, her best finish is 8th, at La Molina in 2009–10. Her best overall finish is 22nd, in 2009–10.
