= Palmer Taylor =

Canadian snowboarder (born 1992)

Personal information
- Born: 13 September 1992 (age 32); Welland, Ontario, Canada
- Height: 160 cm (5 ft 3 in)
- Weight: 54 kg (119 lb)

Sport
- Country: Canada

Palmer Taylor (born 13 September 1992 at Welland, Ontario) is a Canadian snowboarder.

Raised in Pelham, Ontario, she competed at the 2010 Winter Olympics in Vancouver in the women's halfpipe competition.
