= Christophe Schmidt =

German snowboarder

Personal information
- Nationality: German
- Born: June 15, 1983 (age 41)

Sport
- Sport: Snowboarding

Christophe Schmidt (born 15 June 1983 in Schliersee) is a German snowboarder. He competed in the men's halfpipe event at the 2006 Winter Olympics, where he placed eighth, and the 2010 Winter Olympics, where he placed twentieth.
