= Roger S. Kleivdal =

Norwegian snowboarder

Personal information
- Nationality: Norwegian
- Born: 13 March 1988 (age 37)

Sport
- Sport: Snowboarding

Roger Skogheim Kleivdal (born 13 March 1988) is a Norwegian snowboarder who competes for the club NTG Geilo. He represented Norway at the 2010 Winter Olympics in Vancouver.
