= Verena Rohrer =

Swiss snowboarder (born 1996)

Personal information
- Born: 8 April 1996 (age 30) Sachseln, Switzerland

Sport
- Sport: Skiing

Verena Rohrer (born 8 April 1996 in Sachseln) is a Swiss snowboarder, specializing in halfpipe.

Rohrer competed at the 2014 Winter Olympics for Switzerland. In the halfpipe, she finished 27th in the qualifying round, failing to advance.

Rohrer made her World Cup debut in August 2013. As of September 2014, her best finish is 20th, at Copper Mountain in 2010–11. Her best overall finish is 43rd, in 2013–14.
