= Sarah Conrad =

Canadian snowboarder

Sarah Conrad (born March 9, 1985, in Halifax, Nova Scotia) is a Canadian snowboarder, specializing in the halfpipe.

Conrad made her World Cup debut in December 2002 at Whistler, British Columbia. She made her first World Cup podium at Stoneham, Canada in March 2008, where she won silver. To date, she has won one other medal, a bronze in March 2009.

Conrad has also competed in two FIS Snowboarding World Championships, with her best performance coming in 2009, when she finished 12th.

Conrad competed at the 2006 Winter Olympics, in the halfpipe. She finished 20th in the first qualifying round and 9th in the second, not enough to qualify for the final.

Conrad was also selected as a member of the Canadian team for the 2010 Winter Olympics.

== World Cup podiums ==
Date	Location	Rank
March 9, 2008	Stoneham	2nd place, silver medalist(s)
March 21, 2009	Valmalenco	3rd place, bronze medalist(s)
