= Clémence Grimal =

French snowboarder (born 1994)

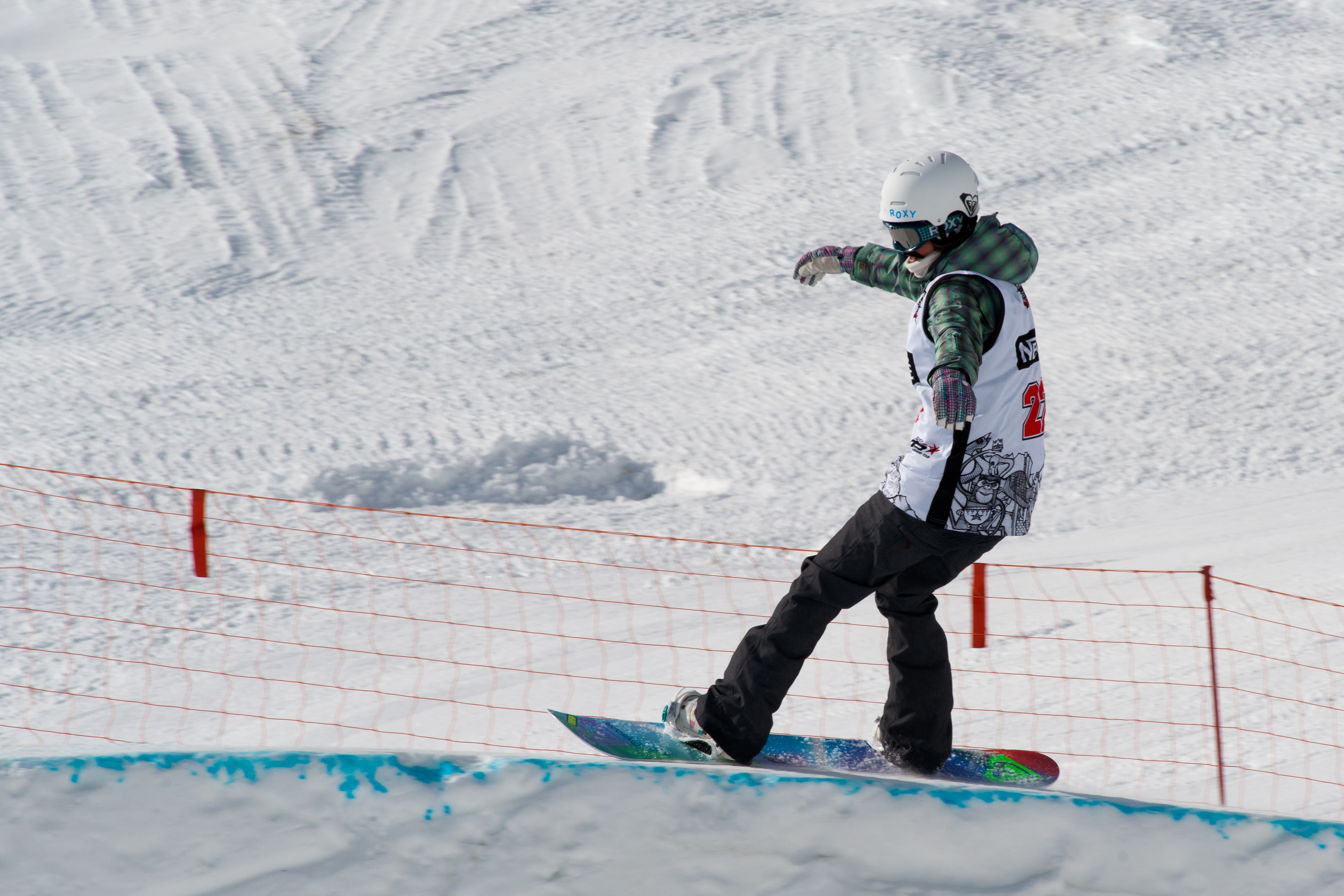

Personal information
- Born: 4 March 1994 (age 32) Figeac, France

Sport
- Sport: Skiing

World Cup career
- Indiv. podiums: 1
Medal record
Women's snowboarding
Representing France
World Championships
Bronze medal – third place	2015 Kreischberg	Halfpipe

Clémence Grimal (born 4 March 1994 in Figeac) is a French snowboarder, specializing in halfpipe.

Grimal competed at the 2014 Winter Olympics for France. In the halfpipe, she finished 15th in the qualifying round, advancing to the semifinal. However, in the semifinal, she was not able to advance, finishing 8th, to end up 14th overall.

Grimal made her World Cup debut in March 2010. As of September 2014, she has one podium finish, winning a bronze medal at Ruka in 2013–14. Her best overall finish is 10th, in 2013–14.

== World Cup podiums ==
Date	Location	Rank	Event
13 December 2013	Ruka	3rd place, bronze medalist(s)	Halfpipe
