= Nadja Purtschert =

Swiss snowboarder (born 1989)

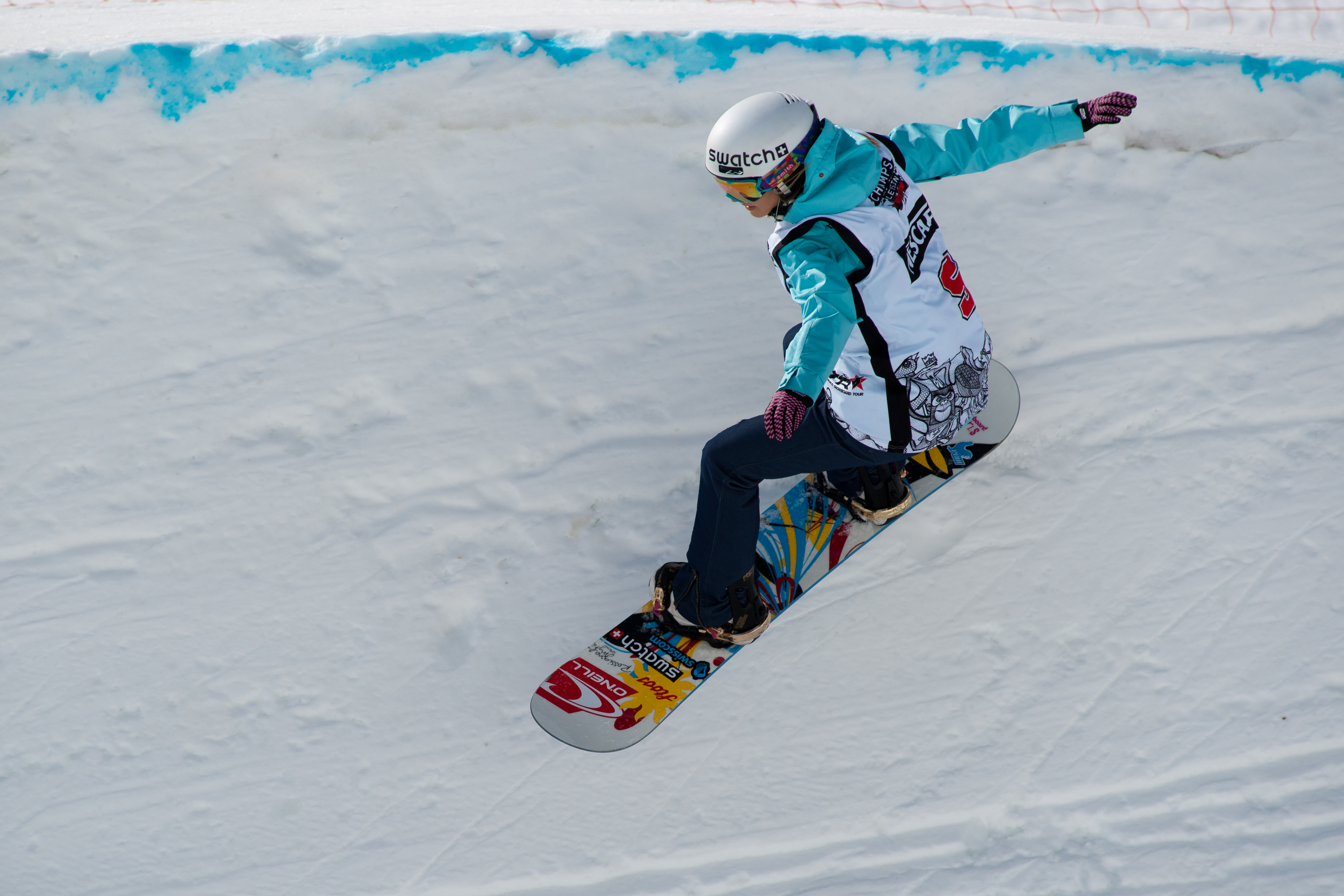

Personal information
- Born: 3 September 1989 (age 36) Pfaffnau, Switzerland

Sport
- Sport: Skiing

Nadja Purtschert (born 3 September 1989) is a Swiss snowboarder, specializing in halfpipe.

Purtschert competed at the 2014 Winter Olympics for Switzerland. In the halfpipe, she finished 23rd in the qualifying round, failing to advance.

As of September 2014, her best showing at the World Championships is 15th, in the 2011 halfpipe.

Purtschert made her World Cup debut in November 2006. As of September 2014, her best finish is 6th, at halfpipe and slopestyle events at Bardonecchia in 2010–11. Her best overall finish is 8th, in 2010–11.
