= Hannah Trigger =

Australian snowboarder (born 1987)

Hannah Trigger (born 5 February 1987) is an Australian snowboarder. She is a participant at the 2014 Winter Olympics in Sochi.
