= Stephanie Magiros =

Australian snowboarder (born 1991)

Stephanie Magiros (born 5 May 1991 in Paddington, New South Wales, Australia) is an Australian snowboarder. She was a participant at the 2014 Winter Olympics in Sochi. Magiros also competes in artistic gymnastics with the hope of becoming the first Australian to make back-to-back Summer and Winter Olympic Games.
