= Kendall Brown (snowboarder) =

New Zealand snowboarder (born 1989)

Kendall Brown (born 15 August 1989 in Dunedin, New Zealand), is a halfpipe snowboarder based in Wānaka, New Zealand. At age 16, she finished 25th at the 2006 Winter Olympics. At the 2010 Winter Olympics, she finished 15th, after dislocating her shoulder twice in the semi-finals.

== Career ==
She started snowboarding aged 11. She uses a goofy stance, i.e. leads with the right foot.

== Sponsorships ==
Brown has a sponsorship with Roxy, the women's brand of the Australian surfing company Quiksilver.
