= Calynn Irwin =

Canadian snowboarder

Personal information
- Born: February 24, 1989 (age 37) Toronto, Ontario, Canada
- Height: 160 cm (5 ft 3 in)
- Weight: 56 kg (123 lb)

Sport
- Country: Canada
- Sport: Snowboarding
- Event: Half-pipe

Achievements and titles
- Olympic finals: 2018 Winter Olympics

Calynn Irwin (born February 24, 1989) is a Canadian snowboarder, competing in the discipline of half-pipe.

== Career ==
=== 2018 Winter Olympics ===
In January 2018, Irwin was named to Canada's 2018 Olympic team.
