= Katie Tsuyuki =

Canadian snowboarder

Personal information
- Nationality: Canadian
- Born: 4 March 1982 (age 43) Scarborough, Ontario
- Height: 1.68 m (5 ft 6 in)
- Weight: 52 kg (115 lb)

Sport
- Country: Canada
- Sport: Snowboarding

Katie Tsuyuki (born March 4, 1982) is a Canadian snowboarder. She competes in half-pipe and represented Canada in this event at the 2014 Winter Olympics in Sochi.
