= Kwon Sun-oo =

South Korean snowboarder (born 1999)

Personal information
- Nationality: South Korean
- Born: 14 January 1999 (age 27)
- Height: 1.71 m (5 ft 7 in)

Sport
- Country: South Korea
- Sport: Snowboarding
- Event: Halfpipe

- Kwon Sun-oo
- Hangul: 권선우
- RR: Gwon Seonu
- MR: Kwŏn Sŏnu

Kwon Sun-oo (born 14 January 1999) is a South Korean snowboarder. She competed in the 2018 Winter Olympics.
