= Rana Okada =

Japanese snowboarder (born 1991)

Rana Okada (岡田 良菜, Okada Rana, born 5 January 1991) is a Japanese snowboarder. She has represented Japan at the 2010 Winter Olympics in Vancouver and the 2014 Winter Olympics in Sochi.
