= Rebecca Sinclair (snowboarder) =

New Zealand snowboarder (born 1991)

- Born: 11 September 1991 (age 34); Auckland, New Zealand
- Other names: Bex
- Occupation: Snowboarder

Rebecca Sinclair (born 11 September 1991 in Auckland) is a halfpipe snowboarder based in Wānaka, New Zealand. She was the youngest New Zealand athlete to compete at the 2010 Winter Olympics (age 18) and finished 21st. Sinclair also competed at the 2014 Winter Olympics. Sinclair's results over the last few years include:

2012/2013 2nd World Cup Finland, 4th World Cup Canada, 4th TTR World Snowboard Championships, 6th X Games Europe, Snow Sports NZ "Snowboarder of the year"

2011/2012 4th FIS World Snowboard Championships, 6th US Open, Snow Sports NZ "Snowboarder of the year"

2010/2011 2nd Junior World Snowboard Championships, 21st Winter Olympics Vancouver

== Sponsorships ==
Sinclair has a sponsorship with Megaphone, Moonbars, and K2 Snowboards.

== Video ==
There are videos on YouTube of Sinclair snowboarding.
