= Liu Jiayu =

Chinese snowboarder (born 1992)

Medal record

Women's snowboarding

Representing China
Event	1st	2nd	3rd
Winter Olympics	0	1	0
World Championships	1	0	1
Winter Asian Games	1	0	1
Total	2	1	2

Winter Olympics
Silver medal – second place	2018 Pyeongchang	Halfpipe

World Championships
Gold medal – first place	2009 Gangwon	Halfpipe
Bronze medal – third place	2011 La Molina	Halfpipe

Winter Asian Games
Gold medal – first place	2017 Sapporo	Halfpipe
Bronze medal – third place	2007 Changchun	Halfpipe

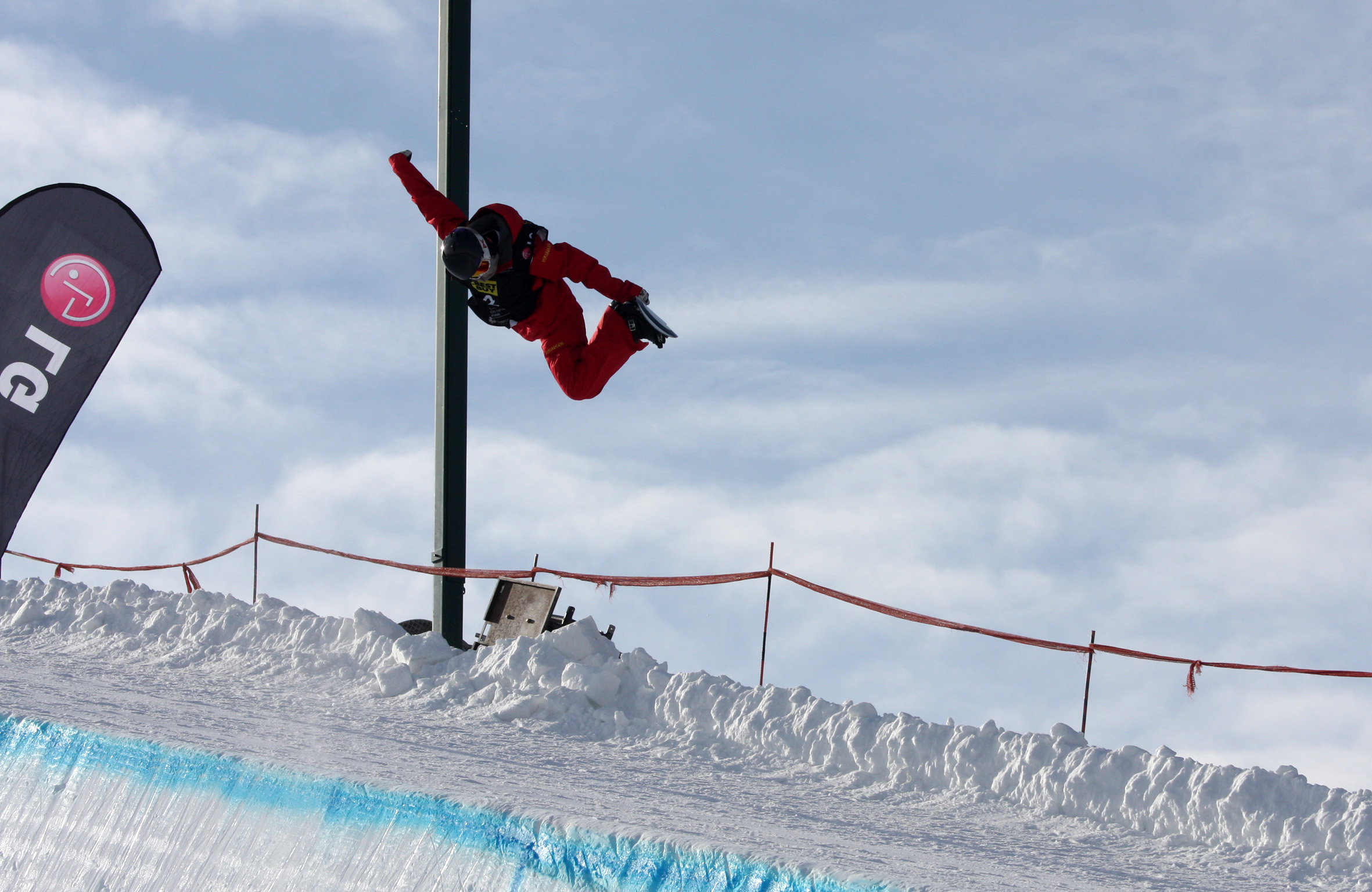
Liu Jiayu, 29 January 2010

Liu Jiayu
- Simplified Chinese: 刘佳宇
- Traditional Chinese: 劉佳宇
Transcriptions
Standard Mandarin
- Hanyu Pinyin: Liú Jiāyǔ
- IPA: [ljǒʊ tɕjá ỳ]

Liu Jiayu (born 17 September 1992) is a Chinese snowboarder whose specialization is the half-pipe. She has six World Cup Victories and a halfpipe victory at the FIS Snowboarding World Championships 2009. She began snowboarding in 2003, switching over from martial arts at the relatively late age of 11. Liu competed for China at the 2010, 2014, and 2018 Winter Olympics, where she achieved 4th, 9th, and 2nd place, respectively.

Liu was born in Hegang but moved to Harbin for winter sports training. Her nickname is Birdie.
