= Cilka Sadar =

Slovenian snowboarder (born 1991)

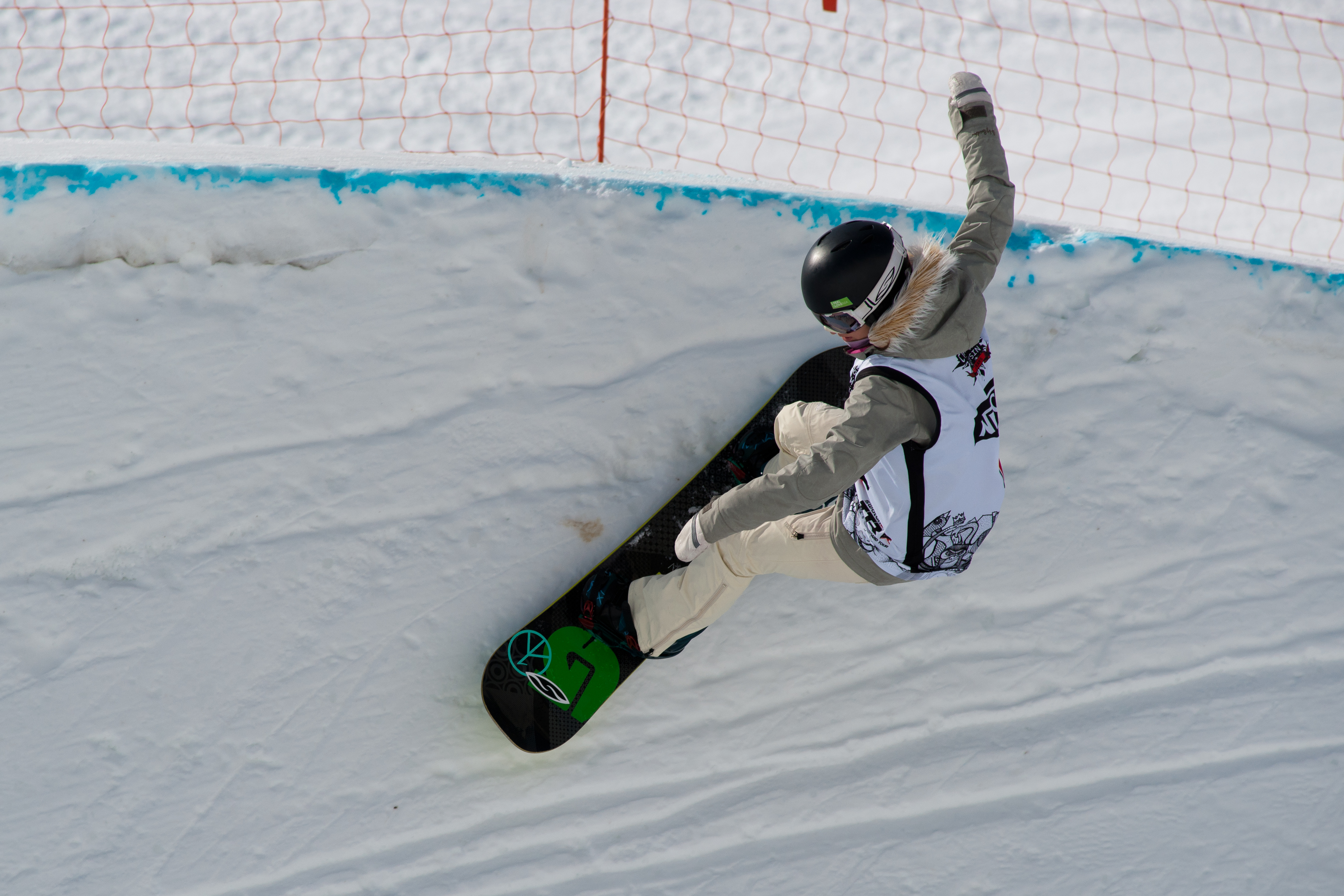
Cilka Sadar in 2011

Cilka Sadar (born 18 September 1991) is a Slovenian snowboarder. She competed at the 2010 Winter Olympics in Vancouver, Canada, where she finished 17th in halfpipe. Sadar also qualified for the 2014 Winter Olympics, however, she injured her knee during the practice in Sochi and had to withdraw from the games without competing.
