= Ursina Haller =

Swiss snowboarder

Medal record

Representing Switzerland

FIS Snowboarding World Championships
Silver medal – second place	2011 La Molina	Halfpipe

New Zealand Winter Games
Bronze medal – third place	2011 Cardrona	Halfpipe

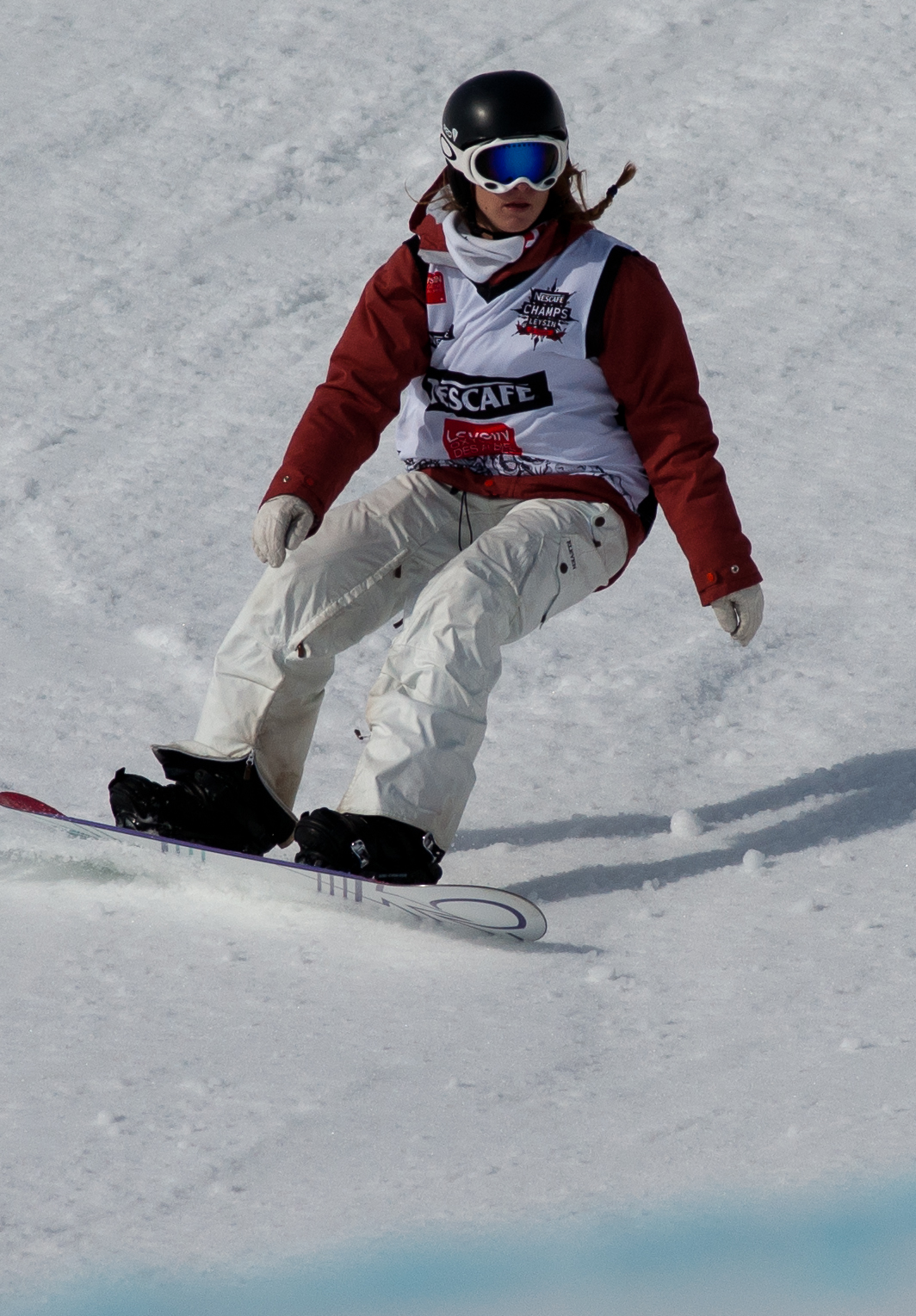
Ursina Haller

Ursina Haller (born 29 December 1985 in Zernez) is a snowboarder from Switzerland. She competed for Switzerland at the 2010 Winter Olympics in halfpipe, finishing ninth; and at the 2014 Winter Olympics in the same event, finishing twelfth. Haller captured a silver medal at the 2011 FIS Snowboarding World Championships.
