= Hikaru Ōe =

Japanese snowboarder (born 1995)

Personal information
- Nationality: Japanese
- Born: 3 August 1995 (age 30) Toyama, Toyama
- Height: 1.58 m (5 ft 2 in)

Sport
- Country: Japan
- Sport: Snowboarding
- Event: Halfpipe
Medal record
Women's Snowboarding
Representing Japan
Winter Youth Olympic Games
Gold medal – first place	2012 Innsbruck	Halfpipe

Hikaru Ōe (大江 光, Ōe Hikaru; born 3 August 1995) is a Japanese snowboarder. She competed in the 2018 Winter Olympics.
