= Alexandra Duckworth =

Canadian snowboarder

Personal information
- Born: November 11, 1987 (age 37); Kingsburg, Nova Scotia, Canada
- Height: 1.58 m (5 ft 2 in)
- Weight: 50 kg (110 lb)

Sport
- Country: Canada
- Sport: Snowboarding

Alexandra Duckworth (born November 11, 1987) is a Canadian snowboarder. She competes primarily in half-pipe and represented Canada in this event at the 2014 Winter Olympics in Sochi.

She officially retired from competitive snowboarding on December 1, 2015. Duckworth has been working as a philanthropist. Her paternal grandmother is noted pacifist, feminist and social and community activist, Muriel Duckworth.
