= Li Shuang (snowboarder) =

Chinese snowboarder (born 1992)

Li Shuang (Chinese: 李爽; pinyin: Lǐ Shuǎng; Mandarin pronunciation: [lì ʂwàŋ]; born 27 June 1992) is a Chinese snowboarder. She represented China at the 2014 Winter Olympics in Sochi.

== Career ==
When she was 10, Li shifted from alpine skiing to snowboarding in the half-pipe. She became a member of the national team in 2006. At the 12th National Winter Games of China held in 2012, Li received three gold medals in snowboarding in the team, individual, and freestyle categories. The People's Daily said that her performance at these games made her gain national fame. At the beginning of 2013, Li had a hip injury at a Salt Lake City competition. She paused her training and spent 20 days in recovery. Later in the year, Li won a gold medal at the 2013 Winter Universiade, scoring 81 points, which was 10.75 points more than the second-place finisher. Li competed in the women's halfpipe event at the 2014 Winter Olympics in Sochi and placed eighth.
