= Mercedes Nicoll =

Canadian snowboarder (born 1983)

Mercedes Nicoll (born December 5, 1983, in North Vancouver, British Columbia) is a Canadian snowboarder, specializing in the halfpipe.

== Career ==
Nicoll made her World Cup debut in December 1999 at Whistler, Canada, in halfpipe and snowboard cross. She made her first World Cup podium at the same place, three years later in 2002, where she won bronze.

To date, Nicoll has won eight other World Cup medals, though she is yet to win a gold. Her best World Cup season was 2005, when she placed 4th in the halfpipe standings. She has also competed in four FIS Snowboarding World Championships, with her best performance coming in 2011, when she finished 8th. She is a five time Canadian National Champion.

Nicoll competed at the 2006 Winter Olympics, in the halfpipe. She finished 9th in the first qualifying round and 21st in the second, not enough to qualify for the final, and placing her 27th overall.

Nicoll was also selected as a member of the Canadian team for the 2010 Winter Olympics, where she finished 6th. Four years later at the 2014 Winter Olympics, Nicoll finished 12th place (out of 14) in her heat and did not advance to the final.

=== 2018 Winter Olympics ===
In January 2018, Nicoll was named to Canada's Olympic team, for the fourth time.

== World Cup podiums ==
Date	Location	Rank
March 18, 2010	La Molina	2nd place, silver medalist(s)
March 11, 2010	Valmalenco	3rd place, bronze medalist(s)
December 17, 2006	Whistler	3rd place, bronze medalist(s)
December 13, 2002	Whistler	3rd place, bronze medalist(s)
February 25, 2005	Sungwoo Resort	3rd place, bronze medalist(s)
February 25, 2005	Sungwoo Resort	3rd place, bronze medalist(s)
March 3, 2005	Lake Placid	2nd place, silver medalist(s)
September 15, 2005	Valle Nevado	3rd place, bronze medalist(s)
