= Mirabelle Thovex =

French snowboarder (born 1991)

Mirabelle Thovex (born 24 August 1991 in Auray) is a French snowboarder. Thovex started snowboarding when she was 8 years old, and has been on the French national team since the age of 15. Thovex competed in the women’s halfpipe event at the 2010 Winter Olympics.

She is the sister of freestyle skier Candide Thovex.
