= Sun Zhifeng =

Chinese snowboarder (born 1991)

Sun Zhifeng (孙志峰)
Personal information
- Born: July 17, 1991 (age 34)
- Height: 1.58 m (5 ft 2 in)
- Weight: 58 kg (128 lb)

Sport
- Country: China
- Sport: Half-pipe

Sun Zhifeng (Chinese: 孙志峰; born July 17, 1991, in Changchun) is a snowboarder who competes in Half-pipe. She has two World Cup victories and competed at the 2006 Winter Olympics. Sun competed for China at the 2010 Winter Olympics in women's Half-pipe.
