= Sophie Rodriguez =

French snowboarder (born 1988)

Personal information
- Born: 7 July 1988 (age 37) Échirolles, France
Medal record
Women's snowboarding
Representing France
FIS Snowboarding World Championships
Bronze medal – third place	2013 Stoneham	Halfpipe

Sophie Rodriguez (born 7 July 1988) is a French snowboarder who won a bronze medal in halfpipe at 2013 FIS Snowboarding World Championships, behind Arielle Gold and Holly Crawford.
