= Holly Crawford =

Australian snowboarder

Personal information
- Born: 10 February 1984 (age 42) Sydney, New South Wales, Australia
- Height: 173 cm (5 ft 8 in) (2014)
- Weight: 63 kg (139 lb) (2014)

Sport
- Country: Australia
- Sport: Snowboarding
Medal record
Women's snowboarding
Representing Australia
World Championships
Gold medal – first place	2011 La Molina	Halfpipe
Silver medal – second place	2009 Gangwon	Halfpipe
Silver medal – second place	2013 Stoneham	Halfpipe
New Zealand Winter Games
Silver medal – second place	2011 Cardrona	Halfpipe
- Updated on 6 February 2014

Holly Crawford (born 10 February 1984) is an Australian half-pipe snowboarder. She competed in the 2006 Winter Olympics and placed 22nd and 12th in her qualification runs. She ranked 19th out of 34 competitors and did not make the final. Crawford also competed in the 2010 Winter Olympics and finished 8th in the final having qualified 1st in the semifinals. She missed out on direct qualification to the final by one place, finishing 7th in the qualifying round.

She won a silver medal in halfpipe at 2013 FIS Snowboarding World Championships, behind American Arielle Gold.

She competed for Australia at the 2014 Winter Olympics in the snowboarding events.

In December 2016, Crawford was named to Australia's team for the 2017 Asian Winter Games in Sapporo, Japan.
