= Snowboarding at the 2026 Winter Olympics – Men's slopestyle =

Men's slopestyle at the XXV Olympic Winter Games
- Snowboarding
- Venue: Livigno Snow Park, Valtellina
- Date: 15, 18 February
- Competitors: 30 from 14 nations
- Winning points: 82.41

Medalists
1st place, gold medalist(s)		Su Yiming	China
2nd place, silver medalist(s)		Taiga Hasegawa	Japan
3rd place, bronze medalist(s)		Jake Canter	United States

The men's slopestyle competition in snowboarding at the 2026 Winter Olympics was held on 15 February (qualification) and 18 February (final), at the Livigno Snow Park in Valtellina. Su Yiming of China became the Olympic champion, earning his first Olympic gold medal in this event after winning silver in 2022. Taiga Hasegawa of Japan won the silver medal, while Jake Canter of the United States claimed the bronze. For Hasegawa and Canter, these were their first Olympic medals.

== Background ==
The defending Olympic champion, Max Parrot, did not compete in the event. The 2022 silver medalist Su Yiming and the 2022 bronze medalist Mark McMorris both qualified for the event. Su was leading the 2025–26 FIS Snowboard World Cup standings in men's slopestyle during the 2025–26 season prior to the Olympics. The reigning 2025 World champion was Liam Brearley.

== Summary ==
In the final, Su Yiming took the lead with his opening run with a score of 82.41, a mark that held up through three runs to secure the gold medal on his 22nd birthday, giving China its first gold of the Milano-Cortina 2026 Winter Olympics. Taiga Hasegawa of Japan finished second with 82.13, while Jake Canter of the United States claimed bronze with 79.36; both earned their first Olympic medals. For Canter, this achievement came nine years after a medically-induced coma. Mark McMorris, who has three Olympic slopestyle bronze medals, finished eighth after crashing on two of his three runs.

== Results ==
=== Qualification ===
Q — Qualified for the Final

The top 12 athletes in the qualifiers advance to the Final.

Rank	Bib	Order	Name	Country	Run 1	Run 2	Best	Notes
1	5	2	Dane Menzies	New Zealand	86.06	23.33	86.06	Q
2	8	4	Marcus Kleveland	Norway	76.96	81.86	81.86	Q
3	9	5	Mark McMorris	Canada	81.81	78.58	81.81	Q
4	16	11	Ryoma Kimata	Japan	73.18	80.83	80.83	Q
5	12	14	Cameron Spalding	Canada	33.61	78.76	78.76	Q
6	2	9	Oliver Martin	United States	66.51	78.30	78.30	Q
7	6	1	Romain Allemand	France	76.05	36.93	76.05	Q
8	1	10	Su Yiming	China	70.83	72.78	72.78	Q
9	10	7	Taiga Hasegawa	Japan	26.98	72.03	72.03	Q
10	4	3	Jake Canter	United States	70.53	60.00	70.53	Q
11	3	8	Redmond Gerard	United States	57.43	70.00	70.00	Q
12	21	23	Mons Røisland	Norway	15.56	69.63	69.63	Q
13	23	22	Eli Bouchard	Canada	17.65	69.51	69.51	
14	11	19	Kira Kimura	Japan	69.20	40.33	69.20	
15	22	29	Lyon Farrell	New Zealand	68.61	65.80	68.61	
16	7	6	Øyvind Kirkhus	Norway	46.83	61.83	61.83	
17	18	18	Ian Matteoli	Italy	43.81	58.90	58.90	
18	13	20	Rocco Jamieson	New Zealand	56.56	42.28	56.56	
19	19	15	Jonas Hasler	Switzerland	55.90	53.83	55.90	
20	17	12	Rene Rinnekangas	Finland	46.23	34.60	46.23	
21	27	26	Jakub Hrones	Czech Republic	44.98	29.61	44.98	
22	29	27	Yang Wenlong	China	16.96	41.73	41.73	
23	14	16	Noah Vicktor	Germany	26.81	34.81	34.81	
24	25	24	Enzo Valax	France	33.40	34.26	34.26	
25	20	13	Clemens Millauer	Austria	32.03	25.40	32.03	
26	15	17	Sean FitzSimons	United States	26.50	20.43	26.50	
27	28	21	Txema Mazet-Brown	Great Britain	22.26	23.01	23.01	
28	30	25	Ge Chunyu	China	21.70	19.61	21.70	
29	24	30	Francis Jobin	Canada	13.33	17.80	17.80	
	26	28	Hiroto Ogiwara	Japan	DNS			

=== Final ===
Rank	Bib	Order	Name	Country	Run 1	Run 2	Run 3	Best
1st place, gold medalist(s)	1	5	Su Yiming	China	82.41	79.90	82.18	82.41
2nd place, silver medalist(s)	10	4	Taiga Hasegawa	Japan	82.13	69.05	22.30	82.13
3rd place, bronze medalist(s)	4	3	Jake Canter	United States	70.58	33.11	79.36	79.36
4	8	11	Marcus Kleveland	Norway	23.70	42.63	78.96	78.96
5	6	6	Romain Allemand	France	76.95	52.28	35.06	76.95
6	3	2	Red Gerard	United States	76.60	29.71	41.65	76.60
7	5	12	Dane Menzies	New Zealand	76.10	21.03	34.61	76.10
8	9	10	Mark McMorris	Canada	75.50	37.56	39.53	75.50
9	2	7	Oliver Martin	United States	48.23	73.96	75.36	75.36
10	12	8	Cameron Spalding	Canada	41.66	75.13	37.30	75.13
11	16	9	Ryoma Kimata	Japan	72.80	17.58	54.40	72.80
12	21	1	Mons Røisland	Norway	26.10	46.50	45.40	46.50
