= FIS Freestyle Ski and Snowboarding World Championships 2025 – Men's snowboard big air =

Men's snowboard big air at the FIS Freestyle Ski and Snowboarding World Championships 2025
- Location: St. Moritz, Switzerland
- Date: 25 March (qualification); 28 March (final)
- Competitors: 58 from 25 nations
- Winning points: 176.75

Medalists
gold medal	Ryoma Kimata	Japan
silver medal	Taiga Hasegawa	Japan
bronze medal	Oliver Martin	United States

The Men's snowboard big air competition at the FIS Freestyle Ski and Snowboarding World Championships 2025 was held on 25 and 28 March 2025.

== Qualification ==
The qualification was started on 25 March at 11:30. The five best snowboarders from each heat qualified for the final.

=== Heat 1 ===
Rank	Bib	Start order	Name	Country	Run 1	Run 2	Run 3	Total	Notes
1	4	2	Hiroto Ogiwara	Japan	33.75	87.25	88.75	176.00	Q
2	13	9	Oliver Martin	United States	63.25	79.25	87.25	166.50	Q
3	12	6	Mons Røisland	Norway	85.00	59.75	77.75	162.75	Q
4	1	1	Taiga Hasegawa	Japan	87.50	74.00	DNI	161.50	Q
5	25	11	Ryoma Kimata	Japan	86.25	69.50	70.75	157.00	Q
6	15	10	Kira Kimura	Japan	10.25	89.50	65.50	155.00	
7	16	3	Marcus Kleveland	Norway	18.50	55.25	83.50	138.75	
8	41	17	Ge Chunyu	China	71.75	64.00	DNI	135.75	
9	39	15	Ville Jukola	Finland	14.50	73.50	59.75	133.25	
10	19	4	Lyon Farrell	New Zealand	65.25	66.00	DNI	131.25	
11	49	22	Emiliano Lauzi	Italy	61.25	57.25	73.50	130.75	
12	34	20	Alex Lotorto	Switzerland	16.75	73.00	55.50	128.50	
13	5	8	Cameron Spalding	Canada	60.25	62.00	DNI	122.25	
14	11	7	Rocco Jamieson	New Zealand	50.00	67.25	51.75	119.00	
15	8	5	Øyvind Kirkhus	Norway	80.50	19.00	31.50	112.00	
16	37	29	Nicolas Huber	Switzerland	20.00	19.75	69.00	89.00	
17	44	23	William Mathisen	Sweden	27.50	42.75	38.00	80.75	
18	48	26	Moritz Breu	Germany	17.75	64.25	14.75	79.00	
19	53	24	Joewen Frijns	Belgium	62.75	12.25	15.25	78.00	
20	23	16	Dusty Henricksen	United States	53.00	11.00	14.25	67.25	
21	57	21	Nias Hedberg	Sweden	44.75	47.50	16.25	63.75	
22	38	12	Erik Jurmu	Finland	18.25	18.00	41.75	60.00	
23	35	19	Julien Merken	France	31.75	26.50	DNI	58.25	
24	21	13	Txema Mazet-Brown	Great Britain	28.00	25.00	21.75	49.75	
25	54	28	Liu Haoyu	China	41.00	8.25	DNS	49.25	
26	29	18	Kalle Järvilehto	Finland	17.00	DNI	18.75	35.75	
27	42	25	Jesse Parkinson	Australia	15.75	DNI	19.25	35.00	
28	28	14	Sam Vermaat	Netherlands	26.00	DNI	DNS	26.00	
29	59	27	Martin Józsa	Slovakia	9.25	17.75	DNI	17.75	

=== Heat 2 ===
Rank	Bib	Start order	Name	Country	Run 1	Run 2	Run 3	Total	Notes
1	7	9	Yang Wenlong	China	86.75	86.50	DNI	173.25	Q
2	10	5	Yuto Miyamura	Japan	86.50	75.25	DNI	161.75	Q
3	3	7	Ian Matteoli	Italy	85.25	74.75	DNI	160.00	Q
4	26	13	Romain Allemand	France	84.25	67.00	89.50	156.50	Q
5	27	19	Enzo Valax	France	72.75	72.75	DNI	145.50	Q
6	2	10	Liam Brearley	Canada	83.25	62.00	DNI	145.25	
7	45	16	Rene Rinnekangas	Finland	64.75	69.25	71.25	136.00	
8	14	1	Jakub Hroneš	Czech Republic	75.75	59.25	DNI	135.00	
9	18	2	Sean FitzSimons	United States	15.75	64.25	68.75	133.00	
10	46	29	Bendik Gjerdalen	Norway	13.75	61.75	67.00	128.75	
11	44	23	Jeremy Denda	Switzerland	62.50	51.75	58.00	120.50	
12	32	15	Loris Framarin	Italy	17.75	79.50	35.25	114.75	
13	40	12	Elias Lehner	Switzerland	57.50	12.25	52.50	110.00	
14	43	26	Dante Brčić	Croatia	14.00	66.00	37.00	103.00	
15	52	25	Naj Mekinc	Slovenia	64.25	38.25	DNI	102.50	
16	56	21	Federico Chiaradio	Argentina	52.25	11.25	49.25	101.50	
17	20	18	Mark McMorris	Canada	78.75	16.75	DNI	95.50	
18	6	3	Dane Menzies	New Zealand	59.75	74.25	18.00	92.25	
19	55	30	Gabriel Almqvist	Sweden	17.00	16.50	70.25	87.25	
20	22	11	Francis Jobin	Canada	64.00	70.50	15.25	85.75	
21	17	4	Clemens Millauer	Austria	17.00	19.00	66.00	85.00	
22	9	8	Su Yiming	China	24.75	24.50	84.25	84.25	
23	24	6	Noah Vicktor	Germany	65.00	16.00	15.50	81.00	
24	50	27	Kristián Salač	Czech Republic	16.75	18.25	17.25	35.50	
25	47	22	José Antonio Aragón	Spain	12.50	13.00	18.75	31.75	
26	36	14	Pedro Pizarro	Chile	14.25	10.75	13.50	27.75	
27	51	24	Álvaro Yáñez	Chile	15.00	5.50	14.25	20.50	
28	58	28	Anthon Bosch	South Africa	13.50	15.00	16.00	16.00	
29	30	17	Leo Framarin	Italy	8.75	DNI	DNI	8.75	
	33	20	Tiarn Collins	New Zealand	Did not start				

== Final ==
The final was started on 28 March at 19:30.

Rank	Bib	Start order	Name	Country	Run 1	Run 2	Run 3	Total
1st place, gold medalist(s)	25	3	Ryoma Kimata	Japan	81.75	22.75	95.00	176.75
2nd place, silver medalist(s)	1	5	Taiga Hasegawa	Japan	49.75	87.00	87.50	174.50
3rd place, bronze medalist(s)	13	8	Oliver Martin	United States	77.50	83.25	88.50	171.75
4	26	2	Romain Allemand	France	85.50	84.75	DNI	170.25
5	10	6	Yuto Miyamura	Japan	87.00	68.75	DNI	155.75
6	27	1	Enzo Valax	France	72.50	76.50	DNI	149.00
7	3	4	Ian Matteoli	Italy	21.00	84.00	24.00	108.00
8	7	9	Yang Wenlong	China	22.25	14.50	81.25	103.50
9	12	7	Mons Røisland	Norway	24.00	DNI	55.75	79.75
10	4	10	Hiroto Ogiwara	Japan	24.50	26.50	20.75	47.25
