= FIS Freestyle Ski and Snowboarding World Championships 2025 – Men's snowboard slopestyle =

Men's snowboard slopestyle at the FIS Freestyle Ski and Snowboarding World Championships 2025
- Location: Corvatsch, Switzerland
- Date: 20 March (qualification); 21 March (final)
- Competitors: 61 from 24 nations
- Winning points: 90.15

Medalists
gold medal	Liam Brearley	Canada
silver medal	Su Yiming	China
bronze medal	Oliver Martin	United States

The Men's snowboard slopestyle competition at the FIS Freestyle Ski and Snowboarding World Championships 2025 was held on 20 and 21 March 2025.

== Qualification ==
The qualification was started on 20 March at 12:30. The eight best snowboarders from each heat qualified for the final.

=== Heat 1 ===
Rank	Bib	Start order	Name	Country	Run 1	Run 2	Best	Notes
1	5	1	Su Yiming	China	86.75	94.75	94.75	Q
2	20	16	Ian Matteoli	Italy	92.00	93.50	93.50	Q
3	50	13	Rene Rinnekangas	Finland	60.75	90.25	90.25	Q
4	9	7	Oliver Martin	United States	65.50	89.50	89.50	Q
5	18	4	Dusty Henricksen	United States	68.75	74.50	74.50	Q
6	3	10	Liam Brearley	Canada	72.75	73.00	73.00	Q
7	8	3	Mons Røisland	Norway	71.50	DNI	71.50	Q
8	7	8	Dane Menzies	New Zealand	29.25	68.75	68.75	Q
9	24	6	Mark McMorris	Canada	62.75	67.50	67.50	
10	25	11	Sam Vermaat	Netherlands	12.25	66.00	66.00	
11	13	2	Francis Jobin	Canada	34.25	64.75	64.75	
12	58	25	Gabriel Almqvist	Sweden	61.75	DNI	61.75	
13	30	12	Nicolas Huber	Switzerland	57.25	59.50	59.50	
14	31	15	Clemens Millauer	Austria	19.50	58.75	58.75	
15	22	18	Lyon Farrell	New Zealand	53.50	58.00	58.00	
16	42	30	Samuel Jaroš	Slovakia	56.25	DNI	56.25	
17	55	20	Emiliano Lauzi	Italy	55.25	DNI	55.25	
18	43	31	Elias Lehner	Switzerland	51.50	DNI	51.50	
19	34	14	Yang Wenlong	China	50.75	DNI	50.75	
20	39	29	Enzo Valax	France	43.25	DNI	43.25	
21	53	27	Joewen Frijns	Belgium	42.25	DNI	42.25	
22	51	24	Álvaro Yáñez	Chile	38.00	DNI	38.00	
23	38	19	Bendik Gjerdalen	Norway	30.75	33.25	33.25	
24	33	17	Txema Mazet-Brown	Great Britain	25.50	27.50	27.50	
25	26	5	Jakub Hroneš	Czech Republic	26.75	DNI	26.75	
26	46	26	Dante Brčić	Croatia	21.75	DNI	21.75	
27	44	21	Jesse Parkinson	Australia	20.75	DNI	20.75	
28	11	9	Sean FitzSimons	United States	13.50	18.50	18.50	
29	47	28	Liu Haoyu	China	14.25	DNI	14.25	
30	56	23	Anthon Bosch	South Africa	8.75	DNI	8.75	
	61	22	Naj Mekinc	Slovenia	Did not start			

=== Heat 2 ===
Rank	Bib	Start order	Name	Country	Run 1	Run 2	Best	Notes
1	28	14	Tiarn Collins	New Zealand	67.50	90.00	90.00	Q
2	10	10	Marcus Kleveland	Norway	84.00	DNI	84.00	Q
3	4	9	Taiga Hasegawa	Japan	63.50	81.75	81.75	Q
4	2	6	Cameron Spalding	Canada	76.50	DNI	76.50	Q
5	21	23	Ryoma Kimata	Japan	8.25	74.00	74.00	Q
6	15	11	Romain Allemand	France	73.25	DNI	73.25	Q
7	1	7	Red Gerard	United States	58.00	70.75	70.75	Q
8	16	8	Noah Vicktor	Germany	69.00	DNI	69.00	Q
9	32	16	Ville Jukola	Finland	63.75	DNI	63.75	
10	6	1	Hiroto Ogiwara	Japan	19.75	61.75	61.75	
11	29	30	William Mathisen	Sweden	60.00	60.50	60.50	
12	12	3	Kira Kimura	Japan	12.50	57.50	57.50	
13	60	22	Erik Jurmu	Finland	52.50	DNI	52.50	
14	19	2	Yuto Miyamura	Japan	51.50	DNI	51.50	
15	59	27	Valentín Moreno	Argentina	48.75	DNI	48.75	
16	17	4	Øyvind Kirkhus	Norway	36.25	48.00	48.00	
17	27	12	Julien Merken	France	47.00	DNI	47.00	
18	14	5	Rocco Jamieson	New Zealand	40.75	46.25	46.25	
19	48	24	Ge Chunyu	China	43.50	DNI	43.50	
20	40	20	Moritz Breu	Germany	12.00	37.50	37.50	
21	41	15	Kristián Salač	Czech Republic	28.00	DNI	28.00	
22	23	19	Jeremy Denda	Switzerland	23.75	DNI	23.75	
23	45	21	José Antonio Aragón	Spain	21.50	DNI	21.50	
24	49	29	Pedro Pizarro	Chile	4.00	20.00	20.00	
25	57	26	Martin Józsa	Slovakia	13.25	19.25	19.25	
26	54	28	Nias Hedberg	Sweden	18.00	DNI	18.00	
27	62	13	Leo Framarin	Italy	16.50	17.25	17.25	
28	35	17	Alex Lotorto	Switzerland	11.25	16.75	16.75	
29	36	18	Loris Framarin	Italy	10.25	15.50	15.50	
30	52	31	Federico Chiaradio	Argentina	13.50	DNI	13.50	
31	37	25	Kalle Järvilehto	Finland	6.75	DNI	6.75	

== Final ==
The final was started on 21 March at 09:00.

Rank	Bib	Start order	Name	Country	Run 1	Run 2	Best
1st place, gold medalist(s)	3	5	Liam Brearley	Canada	49.37	90.15	90.15
2nd place, silver medalist(s)	5	16	Su Yiming	China	85.07	83.95	85.07
3rd place, bronze medalist(s)	9	12	Oliver Martin	United States	12.12	78.98	78.98
4	15	6	Romain Allemand	France	46.78	76.10	76.10
5	1	3	Red Gerard	United States	45.29	74.61	74.61
6	2	9	Cameron Spalding	Canada	72.06	33.86	72.06
7	18	8	Dusty Henricksen	United States	63.58	32.71	63.58
8	16	2	Noah Vicktor	Germany	15.49	62.79	62.79
9	21	7	Ryoma Kimata	Japan	60.88	34.39	60.88
10	20	15	Ian Matteoli	Italy	43.55	60.22	60.22
11	50	14	Rene Rinnekangas	Finland	55.10	60.02	60.02
12	28	13	Tiarn Collins	New Zealand	27.37	51.20	51.20
13	4	10	Taiga Hasegawa	Japan	50.63	41.37	50.63
14	10	11	Marcus Kleveland	Norway	40.76	24.41	40.76
15	7	1	Dane Menzies	New Zealand	32.23	8.44	32.23
16	8	4	Mons Røisland	Norway	16.42	26.54	26.54
