= Snowboarding at the 2026 Winter Olympics – Men's big air =

Men's big air at the XXV Olympic Winter Games
- Snowboarding
- Venue: Livigno Snow Park, Valtellina
- Date: 5, 7 February
- Competitors: 30 from 15 nations

Medalists
1st place, gold medalist(s)		Kira Kimura	Japan
2nd place, silver medalist(s)		Ryoma Kimata	Japan
3rd place, bronze medalist(s)		Su Yiming	China

The men's big air competition in snowboarding at the 2026 Winter Olympics was held on 5 February (qualification) and 7 February (final), at the Livigno Snow Park in Valtellina. Kira Kimura representing Japan became the Olympic champion, with his teammate Ryoma Kimata winning the silver medal. For both of them, this was the first Olympic medal. The defending champion Su Yiming won the bronze medal.

== Background ==
The defending champion Su Yiming and the 2022 silver medalist Mons Røisland both qualified for the event. The 2022 bronze medalist Max Parrot took a break from competitions. Su Yiming was also leading the 2025–26 FIS Snowboard World Cup standings in men's big air, having won two of three competitions prior to the Olympics. The third one, where Su Yiming did not compete, was won by Hiroto Ogiwara. The 2025 World champion was Ryoma Kimata. Su Yiming, Ogiwara, and Kimata were in the field and qualified for the final, but Røisland did not. Canadian Mark McMorris fell in training and was not able to compete but Australia’s Valentino Guseli, a halfpipe qualifier, was added to the men’s big air start list very late and managed to reach the final.

== Results ==
=== Qualification ===
Q — Qualified for the Final
DNI — Does not improve

The top 12 athletes in the qualifiers advance to the Final.

Rank	Bib	Order	Name	Country	Run 1	Run 2	Run 3	Total	Notes
1	8	7	Hiroto Ogiwara	Japan	90.50	88.00	DNI	178.50	Q
2	17	20	Ian Matteoli	Italy	93.75	77.75	80.75	174.50	Q
3	5	2	Kira Kimura	Japan	81.75	79.75	91.50	173.25	Q
4	3	10	Su Yiming	China	22.00	87.75	85.00	172.75	Q
5	1	6	Taiga Hasegawa	Japan	85.00	8.00	87.25	172.25	Q
6	20	18	Francis Jobin	Canada	84.75	84.75	86.00	170.75	Q
7	22	30	Lyon Farrell	New Zealand	25.50	88.50	81.50	170.00	Q
8	14	19	Rocco Jamieson	New Zealand	82.00	83.50	84.75	168.25	Q
9	6	8	Oliver Martin	United States	19.75	82.25	85.25	167.50	Q
10	2	4	Ryoma Kimata	Japan	75.75	75.25	89.50	164.75	Q
11	4	3	Dane Menzies	New Zealand	77.75	86.25	DNI	164.00	Q
12	31	25	Valentino Guseli	Australia	73.25	71.50	91.50	163.00	Q
13	16	16	Marcus Kleveland	Norway	81.75	80.25	79.75	162.00	
14	10	9	Eli Bouchard	Canada	73.75	79.00	82.25	161.25	
15	9	1	Jake Canter	United States	89.00	71.25	DNI	160.25	
16	23	27	Mons Røisland	Norway	86.75	18.00	71.25	158.00	
17	11	17	Romain Allemand	France	15.50	89.75	67.25	157.00	
18	29	26	Clemens Millauer	Austria	78.25	78.00	DNI	156.25	
19	26	24	Yang Wenlong	China	12.50	80.25	75.50	155.75	
20	7	5	Redmond Gerard	United States	70.75	83.50	72.00	155.50	
21	28	21	Txema Mazet-Brown	Great Britain	67.50	84.25	DNI	151.75	
22	21	13	Cameron Spalding	Canada	82.75	62.75	DNI	145.50	
23	13	12	Øyvind Kirkhus	Norway	15.00	84.25	57.75	142.00	
24	27	29	Jonas Hasler	Switzerland	70.75	68.50	DNI	139.25	
25	19	14	Sean FitzSimons	United States	60.75	75.25	DNI	136.00	
26	12	15	Rene Rinnekangas	Finland	62.75	DNI	47.50	110.25	
27	25	28	Enzo Valax	France	12.00	51.50	58.25	109.75	
28	30	22	Jakub Hroneš	Czech Republic	40.00	DNI	46.00	86.00	
29	15	11	Ge Chunyu	China	59.75	6.00	16.00	75.75	
30	24	23	Noah Vicktor	Germany	10.00	DNI	63.50	73.50	

- Australia's Valentino Gulseli entered into big air following the withdrawal of Canada's Mark McMorris due to injury.

=== Final ===
DNI — Does not improve

The final took place on Saturday, 7 February.

Rank	Bib	Order	Name	Country	Run 1	Run 2	Run 3	Total	Notes
1st place, gold medalist(s)	5	10	Kira Kimura	Japan	89.00	15.00	90.50	179.50	
2nd place, silver medalist(s)	2	3	Ryoma Kimata	Japan	86.25	85.25	DNI	171.50	
3rd place, bronze medalist(s)	3	9	Su Yiming	China	88.25	73.75	80.25	168.50	
4	6	4	Oliver Martin	United States	29.75	79.50	83.50	163.00	
5	17	11	Ian Matteoli	Italy	26.25	80.25	82.25	162.50	
6	4	2	Dane Menzies	New Zealand	81.25	79.50	DNI	160.75	
7	20	7	Francis Jobin	Canada	37.25	84.00	65.50	149.50	
8	14	5	Rocco Jamieson	New Zealand	43.00	83.00	29.25	126.00	
9	22	6	Lyon Farrell	New Zealand	83.50	16.50	40.75	124.25	
10	31	1	Valentino Guseli	Australia	23.00	86.75	16.50	109.75	
11	1	8	Taiga Hasegawa	Japan	71.75	16.00	28.75	100.50	
12	8	12	Hiroto Ogiwara	Japan	21.00	DNI	13.75	34.75	
