= FIS Freestyle Ski and Snowboarding World Championships 2023 – Men's snowboard slopestyle =

Men's snowboard slopestyle at the FIS Freestyle Ski and Snowboarding World Championships 2023
- Location: Bakuriani, Georgia
- Dates: 24 February (qualification); 27 February
- Competitors: 51 from 20 nations
- Winning points: 87.23

Medalists
gold medal	Marcus Kleveland	Norway
silver medal	Ryoma Kimata	Japan
bronze medal	Chris Corning	United States

The Men's snowboard slopestyle competition at the FIS Freestyle Ski and Snowboarding World Championships 2023 was held on 24 and 27 February 2023.

== Qualification ==
The qualification was started on 24 February at 10:00. The eight best snowboarders from each heat qualified for the final.

=== Heat 1 ===
Rank	Bib	Start order	Name	Country	Run 1	Run 2	Best	Notes
1	41	25	Takeru Otsuka	Japan	39.38	81.43	81.43	Q
2	4	3	Sven Thorgren	Sweden	76.93	80.05	80.05	Q
3	12	4	Ryoma Kimata	Japan	71.93	22.56	71.93	Q
4	25	23	Jake Canter	United States	54.01	71.21	71.21	Q
5	28	15	Niek van der Velden	Netherlands	68.56	70.75	70.75	Q
6	17	2	Sam Vermaat	Netherlands	38.61	70.21	70.21	Q
7	1	6	Marcus Kleveland	Norway	68.60	54.66	68.60	Q
8	8	10	William Mathisen	Sweden	67.10	13.68	67.10	Q
9	16	9	Seppe Smits	Belgium	57.20	66.78	66.78	
10	54	20	Kalle Järvilehto	Finland	37.66	64.83	64.83	
11	9	7	Cameron Spalding	Canada	35.76	64.06	64.06	
12	42	19	Noah Vicktor	Germany	63.23	1.01	63.23	
13	13	5	Liam Brearley	Canada	58.41	35.18	58.41	
14	24	13	Moritz Thönen	Switzerland	48.03	24.38	48.03	
15	33	22	Francis Jobin	Canada	28.71	40.40	40.40	
16	5	1	Tiarn Collins	New Zealand	38.46	1.90	38.46	
17	20	8	Gabriel Almqvist	Sweden	31.63	36.21	36.21	
18	53	14	Yang Wenlong	China	34.50	DNS	34.50	
19	45	24	Romain Allemand	France	15.60	34.11	34.11	
20	46	12	Mikko Rehnberg	Finland	20.25	28.10	28.10	
21	37	11	Kristián Salač	Czech Republic	27.68	1.50	27.68	
22	21	27	Moritz Boll	Switzerland	27.23	23.98	27.23	
23	49	16	Clemens Millauer	Austria	27.13	26.56	27.13	
24	34	21	Alberto Maffei	Italy	20.26	11.38	20.26	
25	50	17	Álvaro Yáñez	Chile	17.75	18.16	18.16	
26	29	26	Nick Pünter	Switzerland	13.36	DNS	13.36	
	38	18	Samuel Jaroš	Slovakia	Did not start			

=== Heat 2 ===
Rank	Bib	Start order	Name	Country	Run 1	Run 2	Best	Notes
1	14	8	Chris Corning	United States	73.51	80.60	80.60	Q
2	6	7	Mons Røisland	Norway	52.05	78.90	78.90	Q
3	7	3	Taiga Hasegawa	Japan	78.66	60.43	78.66	Q
4	10	2	Nicolas Huber	Switzerland	75.78	72.26	75.78	Q
5	11	6	Lyon Farrell	New Zealand	73.58	25.43	73.58	Q
6	30	23	Brock Crouch	United States	69.78	53.90	69.78	Q
7	18	9	Enzo Valax	France	66.33	27.76	66.33	Q
8	35	16	Jules De Sloover	Belgium	63.53	30.53	63.53	Q
9	19	10	Bendik Gjerdalen	Norway	46.76	61.11	61.11	
10	23	15	Jesse Parkinson	Australia	54.50	6.93	54.50	
11	43	17	Moritz Breu	Germany	53.90	48.96	53.90	
12	31	11	William Almqvist	Sweden	51.96	23.35	51.96	
12	40	27	Nicola Liviero	Italy	51.71	40.48	51.71	
14	44	12	Nicolas Laframboise	Canada	43.01	36.10	43.01	
15	39	14	Lee Dong-heon	South Korea	38.78	12.51	38.78	
16	47	18	Casper Wolf	Netherlands	37.88	18.36	37.88	
17	51	13	Pedro Pizarro	Chile	36.85	26.28	36.85	
18	3	4	Sean FitzSimons	United States	34.40	27.48	34.40	
19	27	21	Jakub Hroneš	Czech Republic	34.06	30.30	34.06	
20	22	19	Ruki Tobita	Japan	33.48	17.00	33.48	
21	26	20	Stian Kleivdal	Norway	26.80	28.11	28.11	
22	52	22	Joewen Frijns	Belgium	24.75	24.13	24.75	
23	48	25	Emil Zulian	Italy	23.15	8.78	23.15	
24	36	26	Naj Mekinc	Slovenia	15.98	21.76	21.76	
25	55	24	Valtteri Kautonen	Finland	9.13	DNS	9.13	
	15	1	Øyvind Kirkhus	Norway	Did not start			
	2	5	Valentino Guseli	Australia	Did not start			

== Final ==
The final was started on 27 February at 15:15.

Rank	Bib	Start order	Name	Country	Run 1	Run 2	Best
1st place, gold medalist(s)	1	4	Marcus Kleveland	Norway	40.33	87.23	87.23
2nd place, silver medalist(s)	12	11	Ryoma Kimata	Japan	83.45	45.23	83.45
3rd place, bronze medalist(s)	14	15	Chris Corning	United States	82.18	32.83	82.18
4	6	13	Mons Røisland	Norway	78.90	24.13	78.90
5	8	2	William Mathisen	Sweden	36.28	77.35	77.35
6	7	12	Taiga Hasegawa	Japan	76.41	32.33	76.41
7	41	16	Takeru Otsuka	Japan	71.78	46.60	71.78
8	30	5	Brock Crouch	United States	68.43	71.63	71.63
9	11	8	Lyon Farrell	New Zealand	67.60	71.28	71.28
10	18	3	Enzo Valax	France	31.28	70.91	70.91
11	25	9	Jake Canter	United States	31.93	69.55	69.55
12	17	6	Sam Vermaat	Netherlands	47.01	67.88	67.88
13	4	14	Sven Thorgren	Sweden	30.01	67.56	67.56
14	28	7	Niek van der Velden	Netherlands	40.76	61.06	61.06
15	35	1	Jules De Sloover	Belgium	48.43	43.20	48.43
16	10	10	Nicolas Huber	Switzerland	32.86	34.36	34.36
