= 2023–24 FIS Snowboard World Cup =

Competitive snowboarding season

| Discipline | Men | Women |
| Parallel Overall | (Austria) Benjamin Karl (4) | (Germany) Ramona Theresia Hofmeister (4) |
| Parallel slalom | (South Korea) Lee Sang-ho (1) | (Germany) Ramona Theresia Hofmeister (1) |
| Parallel giant slalom | (Austria) Benjamin Karl (1) | (Germany) Ramona Theresia Hofmeister (5) |
| Snowboard cross | (Canada) Éliot Grondin (1) | (France) Chloé Trespeuch (1) |
| Freestyle Overall | (Australia) Valentino Guseli (2) | (Japan) Kokomo Murase (2) |
| Halfpipe | (Japan) Ruka Hirano (2) | (Japan) Mitsuki Ono (2) |
| Slopestyle | (Canada) Liam Brearley (1) | (Japan) Kokomo Murase (2) |
| Big Air | (Japan) Kira Kimura (1) | (United Kingdom) Mia Brookes (1) |
- Nations Cup: Italy (2)

Competition
| Edition | 30th | 30th |
| Locations | 29 | 29 |
| Individual | 36 | 36 |
| Team | 5 | 5 |
| Cancelled | 6 | 6 |

The 2023/24 FIS Snowboard Ski World Cup, organized by the International Ski Federation (FIS), is the 30th World Cup in snowboarding for men and women.

The season started on 21 October 2023 in Chur, Switzerland and will conclude on 24 March 2024 in Mont-Sainte-Anne, Canada.

This season includes six disciplines: parallel slalom, parallel giant slalom, snowboard cross, halfpipe, slopestyle and big air.

== Men ==
=== Calendar ===
==== Snowboard Cross (SBX) ====
| # | Date | Place | Winner | Second | Third | Discipline leader | R. |
|---|---|---|---|---|---|---|---|
| 1 | 3 December 2023 | (France) Les Deux Alpes | (Canada) Éliot Grondin | (Austria) Alessandro Hämmerle | (Spain) Lucas Eguibar | (Canada) Éliot Grondin | |
| 2 | 16 December 2023 | (Italy) Cervinia | (Austria) Alessandro Hämmerle | (Australia) Adam Lambert | (Canada) Éliot Grondin | (Austria) Alessandro Hämmerle | |
| 3 | 26 January 2024 | (Switzerland) St. Moritz | (Canada) Éliot Grondin | (Switzerland) Kalle Koblet | (Italy) Omar Visintin | (Canada) Éliot Grondin | |
| 4 | 3 February 2024 | (Georgia (country)) Gudauri | (Canada) Éliot Grondin | (Australia) Cameron Bolton | (Austria) Alessandro Hämmerle | (Canada) Éliot Grondin | |
| 5 | 4 February 2024 | (Georgia (country)) Gudauri | (Canada) Éliot Grondin | (Australia) Cameron Bolton | (Italy) Omar Visintin | (Canada) Éliot Grondin | |
| 6 | 2 March 2024 | (Spain) Sierra Nevada | (Germany) Leon Ulbricht | (Canada) Éliot Grondin | (United States) Jake Vedder | (Canada) Éliot Grondin | |
| 7 | 3 March 2024 | (Spain) Sierra Nevada | (France) Merlin Surget | (Canada) Éliot Grondin | (Austria) Jakob Dusek | (Canada) Éliot Grondin | |
| 8 | 9 March 2024 | (Italy) Cortina d'Ampezzo | (Canada) Éliot Grondin | (United States) Jake Vedder | (Australia) Jarryd Hughes | (Canada) Éliot Grondin | |
| 9 | 16 March 2024 | (Austria) Montafon | (Austria) Alessandro Hämmerle | (France) Léo Le Blé Jaques | (Austria) Julian Lüftner | (Canada) Éliot Grondin | |
| 10 | 17 March 2024 | (Austria) Montafon | (Austria) Alessandro Hämmerle | (Austria) Jakob Dusek | (France) Merlin Surget | (Canada) Éliot Grondin | |
| 11 | 23 March 2024 | (Canada) Mont-Sainte-Anne | (Canada) Éliot Grondin | (Australia) Cameron Bolton | (Czech Republic) Radek Houser | (Canada) Éliot Grondin | |
| 12 | 24 March 2024 | (Canada) Mont-Sainte-Anne | (Canada) Éliot Grondin | (Australia) Cameron Bolton | (Germany) Leon Ulbricht | (Canada) Éliot Grondin | |

==== Parallel (PGS/PSL) ====
| # | Date | Place | Event | Winner | Second | Third | Discipline leader | R. |
|---|---|---|---|---|---|---|---|---|
| 1 | 14 December 2023 | (Italy) Carezza | PGS | (Italy) Maurizio Bormolini | (Italy) Edwin Coratti | (Austria) Benjamin Karl | (Italy) Maurizio Bormolini | |
| 2 | 16 December 2023 | (Italy) Cortina d'Ampezzo | PGS | (Austria) Benjamin Karl | (Austria) Andreas Prommegger | (Italy) Roland Fischnaller | (Austria) Benjamin Karl | |
| 3 | 23 December 2023 | (Switzerland) Davos | PSL | (Italy) Daniele Bagozza | (Austria) Arvid Auner | (Italy) Edwin Coratti | (Italy) Edwin Coratti | |
| 4 | 13 January 2024 | (Switzerland) Scuol | PGS | (Austria) Benjamin Karl | (Slovenia) Tim Mastnak | (Austria) Andreas Prommegger | (Austria) Benjamin Karl | |
| 5 | 16 January 2024 | (Austria) Bad Gastein | PSL | (Italy) Maurizio Bormolini | (Austria) Arvid Auner | (Austria) Fabian Obmann | (Austria) Benjamin Karl | |
| 6 | 20 January 2024 | (Bulgaria) Pamporovo | PSL | (Italy) Daniele Bagozza | (Italy) Edwin Coratti | (Bulgaria) Radoslav Yankov | (Austria) Benjamin Karl | |
| 7 | 21 January 2024 | (Bulgaria) Pamporovo | PSL | (South Korea) Lee Sang-ho | (Austria) Andreas Prommegger | (Austria) Fabian Obmann | (Austria) Benjamin Karl | |
| 8 | 25 January 2024 | (Slovenia) Rogla | PGS | (Austria) Benjamin Karl | (Italy) Aaron March | (Italy) Mirko Felicetti | (Austria) Benjamin Karl | |
| 9 | 27 January 2024 | (Austria) Simonhöhe | PGS | (Italy) Daniele Bagozza | (Austria) Benjamin Karl | (Austria) Fabian Obmann | (Austria) Benjamin Karl | |
| 10 | 15 February 2024 | (Canada) Craigleith | PGS | cancelled | | | | |
| 11 | 24 February 2024 | (Poland) Krynica | PGS | (Austria) Andreas Prommegger | (Italy) Roland Fischnaller | (Italy) Daniele Bagozza | (Austria) Benjamin Karl | |
| 12 | 25 February 2024 | (Poland) Krynica | PGS | (Austria) Arvid Auner | (Italy) Maurizio Bormolini | (Austria) Alexander Payer | (Austria) Benjamin Karl | |
| 13 | 9 March 2024 | (Germany) Winterberg | PSL | (South Korea) Lee Sang-ho | (Austria) Andreas Prommegger | (Italy) Maurizio Bormolini | (South Korea) Lee Sang-ho | |
| 14 | 16 March 2024 | (Germany) Berchtesgaden | PSL | cancelled | | | | |

==== Halfpipe (HP) ====
| # | Date | Place | Winner | Second | Third | Discipline leader | R. |
|---|---|---|---|---|---|---|---|
| 1 | 8 December 2023 | (China) Secret Garden | (Australia) Scotty James | (Japan) Ruka Hirano | (South Korea) Lee Chae-un | (Australia) Scotty James | |
| 2 | 16 December 2023 | (United States) Copper Mountain | (Japan) Ayumu Hirano | (South Korea) Lee Chae-un | (Japan) Yūto Totsuka | (South Korea) Lee Chae-un | |
| 3 | 20 January 2024 | (Switzerland) Laax | (Australia) Scotty James | (Australia) Valentino Guseli | (Japan) Ruka Hirano | (Australia) Scotty James | |
| 4 | 3 February 2024 | (United States) Mammoth Mountain | (Japan) Yūto Totsuka | (Japan) Ruka Hirano | (Japan) Kaishu Hirano | (Japan) Ruka Hirano | |
| 5 | 10 February 2024 | (Canada) Calgary | (Australia) Valentino Guseli | (Japan) Ruka Hirano | (Japan) Shuichiro Shigeno | (Japan) Ruka Hirano | |

==== Slopestyle (SS) ====
| # | Date | Place | Winner | Second | Third | Discipline leader | R. |
|---|---|---|---|---|---|---|---|
| 1 | 20 January 2024 | (Switzerland) Laax | (Canada) Liam Brearley | (Japan) Ryoma Kimata | (Canada) Cameron Spalding | (Canada) Liam Brearley | |
| 2 | 2 February 2024 | (United States) Mammoth Mountain | cancelled | | | | |
| 3 | 11 February 2024 | (Canada) Calgary | cancelled | | | | |
| 4 | 15 March 2024 | (France) Tignes | (Japan) Ryoma Kimata | (France) Romain Allemand | (Japan) Taiga Hasegawa | (Japan) Ryoma Kimata | |
| 5 | 23 March 2024 | (Switzerland) Silvaplana | (Canada) Liam Brearley | (Japan) Taiga Hasegawa | (Australia) Valentino Guseli | (Canada) Liam Brearley | |

==== Big Air (BA) ====
| # | Date | Place | Winner | Second | Third | Discipline leader | R. |
|---|---|---|---|---|---|---|---|
| 1 | 21 October 2023 | (Switzerland) Chur | (Japan) Hiroto Ogiwara | (Japan) Kira Kimura | (Japan) Takeru Otsuka | (Japan) Hiroto Ogiwara | |
| 2 | 2 December 2023 | (China) Beijing | (China) Su Yiming | (Japan) Ryoma Kimata | (Japan) Kira Kimura | (Japan) Kira Kimura | |
| 3 | 9 December 2023 | (Canada) Edmonton | (Japan) Taiga Hasegawa | (China) Su Yiming | (United States) Red Gerard | (Japan) Kira Kimura | |
| 4 | 15 December 2023 | (United States) Copper Mountain | (Japan) Hiroaki Kunitake | (Netherlands) Sam Vermaat | (United States) Red Gerard | (Japan) Kira Kimura | |

=== Standings ===
==== Parallel overall (PSL/PGS) ====
| Rank | after all 12 events | Points |
|---|---|---|
| | (Austria) Benjamin Karl | 626 |
| 2 | (Austria) Andreas Prommegger | 560 |
| 3 | (Italy) Maurizio Bormolini | 548 |
| 4 | (Italy) Daniele Bagozza | 508 |
| 5 | (South Korea) Lee Sang-ho | 477 |

==== Parallel slalom ====
| Rank | after all 5 events | Points |
|---|---|---|
| | (South Korea) Lee Sang-ho | 313 |
| 2 | (Italy) Daniele Bagozza | 252 |
| 3 | (Italy) Maurizio Bormolini | 244 |
| 4 | (Austria) Arvid Auner | 243 |
| 5 | (Austria) Andreas Prommegger | 231 |

==== Parallel giant slalom ====
| Rank | after all 7 events | Points |
|---|---|---|
| | (Austria) Benjamin Karl | 489 |
| 2 | (Austria) Andreas Prommegger | 329 |
| 3 | (Italy) Roland Fischnaller | 308 |
| 4 | (Italy) Maurizio Bormolini | 304 |
| 5 | (Italy) Edwin Coratti | 257 |

==== Snowboard Cross ====
| Rank | after all 12 events | Points |
|---|---|---|
| | (Canada) Éliot Grondin | 952 |
| 2 | (Austria) Alessandro Hämmerle | 604 |
| 3 | (Australia) Cameron Bolton | 552 |
| 4 | (France) Merlin Surget | 383 |
| 5 | (Italy) Omar Visintin | 357 |

==== Freestyle overall (BA/SS/HP) ====
| Rank | after all 12 events | Points |
|---|---|---|
| | (Australia) Valentino Guseli | 350 |
| 2 | (Japan) Ryoma Kimata | 340 |
| 3 | (Japan) Ruka Hirano | 326 |
| 4 | (Canada) Liam Brearley | 311 |
| 5 | (Japan) Taiga Hasegawa | 308 |

==== Halfpipe ====
| Rank | after all 5 events | Points |
|---|---|---|
| | (Japan) Ruka Hirano | 300 |
| 2 | (Australia) Valentino Guseli | 230 |
| 3 | (Australia) Scotty James | 229 |
| 4 | (Japan) Yūto Totsuka | 229 |
| 5 | (Japan) Shuichiro Shigeno | 190 |

==== Slopestyle ====
| Rank | after all 3 events | Points |
|---|---|---|
| | (Canada) Liam Brearley | 229 |
| 2 | (Japan) Ryoma Kimata | 180 |
| 3 | (Japan) Taiga Hasegawa | 140 |
| 4 | (Canada) Cameron Spalding | 112 |
| 5 | (New Zealand) Tiarn Collins | 90 |

==== Big Air ====
| Rank | after all 4 events | Points |
|---|---|---|
| | (Japan) Kira Kimura | 196 |
| 2 | (China) Su Yiming | 180 |
| 3 | (Japan) Taiga Hasegawa | 168 |
| 4 | (Japan) Ryoma Kimata | 160 |
| 5 | (Japan) Hiroaki Kunitake | 148 |

== Women ==
=== Calendar ===
==== Snowboard Cross (SBX) ====
| # | Date | Place | Winner | Second | Third | Discipline leader | R. |
|---|---|---|---|---|---|---|---|
| 1 | 3 December 2023 | (France) Les Deux Alpes | (France) Chloé Trespeuch | (Italy) Michela Moioli | (Australia) Belle Brockhoff | (France) Chloé Trespeuch | |
| 2 | 16 December 2023 | (Italy) Cervinia | (Switzerland) Sina Siegenthaler | (Australia) Belle Brockhoff | (Australia) Josie Baff | (France) Chloé Trespeuch | |
| 3 | 26 January 2024 | (Switzerland) St. Moritz | (Czech Republic) Eva Adamczyková | (Switzerland) Sophie Hediger | (France) Chloé Trespeuch | (France) Chloé Trespeuch | |
| 4 | 3 February 2024 | (Georgia (country)) Gudauri | (France) Chloé Trespeuch | (Czech Republic) Eva Adamczyková | (Switzerland) Sophie Hediger | (France) Chloé Trespeuch | |
| 5 | 4 February 2024 | (Georgia (country)) Gudauri | (United Kingdom) Charlotte Bankes | (France) Chloé Trespeuch | (Australia) Belle Brockhoff | (France) Chloé Trespeuch | |
| 6 | 2 March 2024 | (Spain) Sierra Nevada | (United Kingdom) Charlotte Bankes | (Czech Republic) Eva Adamczyková | (France) Chloé Trespeuch | (France) Chloé Trespeuch | |
| 7 | 3 March 2024 | (Spain) Sierra Nevada | (Italy) Michela Moioli | (Australia) Josie Baff | (United Kingdom) Charlotte Bankes | (France) Chloé Trespeuch | |
| 8 | 9 March 2024 | (Italy) Cortina d'Ampezzo | (United Kingdom) Charlotte Bankes | (Czech Republic) Eva Adamczyková | (Italy) Michela Moioli | (France) Chloé Trespeuch | |
| 9 | 16 March 2024 | (Austria) Montafon | (Italy) Michela Moioli | (United Kingdom) Charlotte Bankes | (Australia) Josie Baff | (Italy) Michela Moioli | |
| 10 | 17 March 2024 | (Austria) Montafon | (France) Chloé Trespeuch | (United States) Lindsey Jacobellis | (Australia) Josie Baff | (France) Chloé Trespeuch | |
| 11 | 23 March 2024 | (Canada) Mont-Sainte-Anne | (United Kingdom) Charlotte Bankes | (France) Chloé Trespeuch | (France) Lea Casta | (France) Chloé Trespeuch | |
| 12 | 24 March 2024 | (Canada) Mont-Sainte-Anne | (United Kingdom) Charlotte Bankes | (Italy) Michela Moioli | (Australia) Josie Baff | (France) Chloé Trespeuch | |

==== Parallel (PGS/PSL) ====
| # | Date | Place | Event | Winner | Second | Third | Discipline leader | R. |
|---|---|---|---|---|---|---|---|---|
| 1 | 14 December 2023 | (Italy) Carezza | PGS | (Germany) Ramona Theresia Hofmeister | (Austria) Daniela Ulbing | (Japan) Tsubaki Miki | (Germany) Ramona Theresia Hofmeister | |
| 2 | 16 December 2023 | (Italy) Cortina d'Ampezzo | PGS | (Germany) Ramona Theresia Hofmeister | (Italy) Lucia Dalmasso | (Austria) Sabine Schöffmann | (Germany) Ramona Theresia Hofmeister | |
| 3 | 23 December 2023 | (Switzerland) Davos | PSL | (Germany) Ramona Theresia Hofmeister | (Italy) Lucia Dalmasso | (Austria) Sabine Schöffmann | (Germany) Ramona Theresia Hofmeister | |
| 4 | 13 January 2024 | (Switzerland) Scuol | PGS | (Italy) Lucia Dalmasso | (Italy) Jasmin Coratti | (Japan) Tsubaki Miki | (Germany) Ramona Theresia Hofmeister | |
| 5 | 16 January 2024 | (Austria) Bad Gastein | PSL | (Germany) Ramona Theresia Hofmeister | (Austria) Sabine Schöffmann | (Italy) Jasmin Coratti | (Germany) Ramona Theresia Hofmeister | |
| 6 | 20 January 2024 | (Bulgaria) Pamporovo | PSL | (Czech Republic) Ester Ledecká | (Germany) Ramona Theresia Hofmeister | (Japan) Tsubaki Miki | (Germany) Ramona Theresia Hofmeister | |
| 7 | 21 January 2024 | (Bulgaria) Pamporovo | PSL | (Czech Republic) Ester Ledecká | (Austria) Sabine Schöffmann | (Japan) Tsubaki Miki | (Germany) Ramona Theresia Hofmeister | |
| 8 | 25 January 2024 | (Slovenia) Rogla | PGS | (Japan) Tsubaki Miki | (Netherlands) Michelle Dekker | (Austria) Sabine Schöffmann | (Germany) Ramona Theresia Hofmeister | |
| 9 | 27 January 2024 | (Austria) Simonhöhe | PGS | (Austria) Sabine Schöffmann | (Czech Republic) Zuzana Maděrová | (Italy) Elisa Caffont | (Germany) Ramona Theresia Hofmeister | |
| 10 | 15 February 2024 | (Canada) Craigleith | PGS | cancelled | | | | |
| 11 | 24 February 2024 | (Poland) Krynica | PGS | (Germany) Ramona Theresia Hofmeister | (Switzerland) Julie Zogg | (Netherlands) Michelle Dekker | (Germany) Ramona Theresia Hofmeister | |
| 12 | 25 February 2024 | (Poland) Krynica | PGS | (Japan) Tsubaki Miki | (Austria) Daniela Ulbing | (Switzerland) Ladina Jenny | (Germany) Ramona Theresia Hofmeister | |
| 13 | 9 March 2024 | (Germany) Winterberg | PSL | (Czech Republic) Ester Ledecká | (Austria) Sabine Schöffmann | (Italy) Lucia Dalmasso | (Germany) Ramona Theresia Hofmeister | |
| 14 | 16 March 2024 | (Germany) Berchtesgaden | PSL | cancelled | | | | |

==== Halfpipe (HP) ====
| # | Date | Place | Winner | Second | Third | Discipline leader | R. |
|---|---|---|---|---|---|---|---|
| 1 | 8 December 2023 | (China) Secret Garden | (China) Cai Xuetong | (China) Liu Jiayu | (United States) Maddie Mastro | (China) Cai Xuetong | |
| 2 | 16 December 2023 | (United States) Copper Mountain | (South Korea) Gaon Choi | (Japan) Mitsuki Ono | (United States) Maddie Mastro | (United States) Maddie Mastro | |
| 3 | 20 January 2024 | (Switzerland) Laax | (Japan) Mitsuki Ono | (United States) Bea Kim | (Japan) Ruki Tomita | (Japan) Mitsuki Ono | |
| 4 | 3 February 2024 | (United States) Mammoth Mountain | (Japan) Mitsuki Ono | (Japan) Sena Tomita | (United States) Maddie Mastro | (Japan) Mitsuki Ono | |
| 5 | 10 February 2024 | (Canada) Calgary | (Japan) Mitsuki Ono | (United States) Maddie Mastro | (Japan) Sena Tomita | (Japan) Mitsuki Ono | |

==== Slopestyle (SS) ====
| # | Date | Place | Winner | Second | Third | Discipline leader | R. |
|---|---|---|---|---|---|---|---|
| 1 | 20 January 2024 | (Switzerland) Laax | (United States) Julia Marino | (Germany) Annika Morgan | (Austria) Anna Gasser | (United States) Julia Marino | |
| 2 | 2 February 2024 | (United States) Mammoth Mountain | cancelled | | | | |
| 3 | 11 February 2024 | (Canada) Calgary | cancelled | | | | |
| 4 | 15 March 2024 | (France) Tignes | (Japan) Kokomo Murase | (Japan) Miyabi Onitsuka | (Japan) Reira Iwabuchi | (Japan) Kokomo Murase | |
| 5 | 23 March 2024 | (Switzerland) Silvaplana | (Japan) Reira Iwabuchi | (Japan) Kokomo Murase | (Austria) Anna Gasser | (Japan) Kokomo Murase | |

==== Big Air (BA) ====
| # | Date | Place | Winner | Second | Third | Discipline leader | R. |
|---|---|---|---|---|---|---|---|
| 1 | 21 October 2023 | (Switzerland) Chur | (Japan) Kokomo Murase | (Japan) Reira Iwabuchi | (United Kingdom) Mia Brookes | (Japan) Kokomo Murase | |
| 2 | 2 December 2023 | (China) Beijing | (Austria) Anna Gasser | (Australia) Tess Coady | (Japan) Miyabi Onitsuka | (Japan) Reira Iwabuchi | |
| 3 | 9 December 2023 | (Canada) Edmonton | (New Zealand) Zoi Sadowski-Synnott | (United Kingdom) Mia Brookes | (Austria) Anna Gasser | (United Kingdom) Mia Brookes | |
| 4 | 15 December 2023 | (United States) Copper Mountain | (Japan) Kokomo Murase | (Japan) Mari Fukada | (United Kingdom) Mia Brookes | (United Kingdom) Mia Brookes | |

=== Standings ===
==== Parallel overall (PSL/PGS) ====
| Rank | after all 12 events | Points |
|---|---|---|
| | (Germany) Ramona Theresia Hofmeister | 786 |
| 2 | (Japan) Tsubaki Miki | 639 |
| 3 | (Austria) Sabine Schöffmann | 638 |
| 4 | (Italy) Lucia Dalmasso | 580 |
| 5 | (Switzerland) Julie Zogg | 469 |

==== Parallel slalom ====
| Rank | after all 5 events | Points |
|---|---|---|
| | (Germany) Ramona Theresia Hofmeister | 357 |
| 2 | (Austria) Sabine Schöffmann | 332 |
| 3 | (Czech Republic) Ester Ledecka | 300 |
| 4 | (Italy) Lucia Dalmasso | 250 |
| 5 | (Japan) Tsubaki Miki | 216 |

==== Parallel giant slalom ====
| Rank | after all 7 events | Points |
|---|---|---|
| | (Germany) Ramona Theresia Hofmeister | 429 |
| 2 | (Japan) Tsubaki Miki | 423 |
| 3 | (Italy) Lucia Dalmasso | 330 |
| 4 | (Austria) Daniela Ulbing | 322 |
| 5 | (Austria) Sabine Schöffmann | 306 |

==== Snowboard Cross ====
| Rank | after all 12 events | Points |
|---|---|---|
| | (France) Chloé Trespeuch | 792 |
| 2 | (United Kingdom) Charlotte Bankes | 757 |
| 3 | (Italy) Michela Moioli | 704 |
| 4 | (Australia) Josie Baff | 608 |
| 5 | (Czech Republic) Eva Adamczyková | 573 |

==== Freestyle overall (BA/SS/HP) ====
| Rank | after all 12 events | Points |
|---|---|---|
| | (Japan) Kokomo Murase | 425 |
| 2 | (Japan) Mitsuki Ono | 380 |
| 3 | (Japan) Reira Iwabuchi | 366 |
| 4 | (Japan) Miyabi Onitsuka | 160 |
| 5 | (United States) Maddie Mastro | 292 |

==== Halfpipe ====
| Rank | after all 5 events | Points |
|---|---|---|
| | (Japan) Mitsuki Ono | 380 |
| 2 | (United States) Maddie Mastro | 260 |
| 3 | (United States) Bea Kim | 230 |
| 4 | (Japan) Sena Tomita | 208 |
| 5 | (Canada) Brooke D'Hondt | 149 |

==== Slopestyle ====
| Rank | after all 3 events | Points |
|---|---|---|
| | (Japan) Kokomo Murase | 225 |
| 2 | (Japan) Reira Iwabuchi | 160 |
| 3 | (Germany) Annika Morgan | 144 |
| 4 | (Canada) Laurie Blouin | 140 |
| 5 | (Japan) Miyabi Onitsuka | 139 |

==== Big Air ====
| Rank | after all 4 events | Points |
|---|---|---|
| | (United Kingdom) Mia Brookes | 250 |
| 2 | (Japan) Mari Fukada | 215 |
| 3 | (Japan) Reira Iwabuchi | 206 |
| 4 | (Japan) Kokomo Murase | 200 |
| 5 | (Japan) Miyabi Onitsuka | 180 |

== Team ==
=== Parallel mixed (SXT) ===
| # | Date | Place | Event | Winner | Second | Third | Discipline leader | R. |
|---|---|---|---|---|---|---|---|---|
| 1 | 17 January 2024 | (Austria) Bad Gastein | PSL | Austria I Andreas Prommegger; Sabine Schöffmann | Italy III Daniele Bagozza; Lucia Dalmasso | Germany I Stefan Baumeister; Ramona Theresia Hofmeister | Austria | |
| 2 | 28 January 2024 | (Austria) Simonhöhe | PGS | Austria I Andreas Prommegger; Sabine Schöffmann | Switzerland II Dario Caviezel; Ladina Jenny | Germany I Elias Huber; Ramona Theresia Hofmeister | Austria | |
| 3 | 16 February 2024 | (Canada) Craigleith | PGS | cancelled | | | | |
| 4 | 10 March 2024 | (Germany) Winterberg | PSL | Italy II Daniele Bagozza; Lucia Dalmasso | Slovenia I Žan Košir; Gloria Kotnik | Italy I Maurizio Bormolini; Elisa Caffont | Austria | |
| 5 | 17 March 2024 | (Germany) Berchtesgaden | PSL | cancelled | | | | |

==== Standings ====
| Rank | after all 3 events | Points |
|---|---|---|
| | Austria I | 245 |
| 2 | Italy II | 165 |
| 3 | Germany I | 160 |
| 4 | Italy I | 160 |
| 5 | Slovenia | 138 |

=== Snowboard cross mixed team (SBX) ===
| # | Date | Place | Winner | Second | Third | Discipline leader | R. |
|---|---|---|---|---|---|---|---|
| 1 | 2 December 2023 | (France) Les Deux Alpes | Great Britain I Huw Nightingale; Charlotte Bankes | France II Loan Bozzolo; Chloé Trespeuch | United States I Jake Vedder; Lindsey Jacobellis | Great Britain | |
| 2 | 17 December 2023 | (Italy) Cervinia | Italy I Omar Visintin; Michela Moioli | France I Loan Bozzolo; Chloé Trespeuch | Switzerland I Kalle Koblet; Sina Siegenthaler | France | |

== Nations Cup ==
=== Overall ===
| Rank | after all 77 events | Points |
|---|---|---|
| | Italy | 4891 |
| 2 | Austria | 4804 |
| 3 | Japan | 4443 |
| 4 | United States | 3541 |
| 5 | Canada | 3384 |

== Podium table by nation ==
Table showing the World Cup podium places (gold–1st place, silver–2nd place, bronze–3rd place) by the countries represented by the athletes.

| Rank | Nation | Gold | Silver | Bronze | Total |
|---|---|---|---|---|---|
| 1 | Japan | 15 | 13 | 15 | 43 |
| 2 | Austria | 12 | 13 | 15 | 40 |
| 3 | Italy | 10 | 11 | 12 | 33 |
| 4 | Canada | 9 | 2 | 2 | 13 |
| 5 | Germany | 6 | 2 | 3 | 11 |
| 5 | Great Britain | 6 | 2 | 3 | 11 |
| 7 | France | 4 | 6 | 4 | 14 |
| 8 | Czech Republic | 4 | 4 | 1 | 9 |
| 9 | Australia | 3 | 9 | 8 | 20 |
| 10 | South Korea | 3 | 1 | 1 | 5 |
| 11 | China | 2 | 2 | 0 | 4 |
| 12 | United States | 1 | 4 | 7 | 12 |
| 13 | Switzerland | 1 | 4 | 3 | 8 |
| 14 | New Zealand | 1 | 0 | 0 | 1 |
| 15 | Netherlands | 0 | 2 | 1 | 3 |
| 16 | Slovenia | 0 | 2 | 0 | 2 |
| 17 | Bulgaria | 0 | 0 | 1 | 1 |
| 17 | Spain | 0 | 0 | 1 | 1 |
| Totals (18 entries) | | 77 | 77 | 77 | 231 |
