= 2025–26 FIS Snowboard World Cup =

Competitive snowboarding season

Discipline	Men	Women
Parallel Overall	(Italy) Maurizio Bormolini (2)	(Japan) Tsubaki Miki (2)
Parallel slalom	(Italy) Maurizio Bormolini (1)	(Italy) Lucia Dalmasso (1)
Parallel giant slalom	(Italy) Maurizio Bormolini (2)	(Japan) Tsubaki Miki (2)
Snowboard Cross	(Germany) Leon Ulbricht (1)	(United Kingdom) Charlotte Bankes (3)
Park & Pipe Overall	(Japan) Yūto Totsuka (1)	(South Korea) Choi Ga-on (1)
Halfpipe	(Japan) Yūto Totsuka (4)	(South Korea) Choi Ga-on (1)
Slopestyle	(China) Su Yiming (1)	(United States) Lily Dhawornvej (1)
Big Air	(China) Su Yiming (1)	(Japan) Miyabi Onitsuka (1)
- Nations Cup Overall: Italy (3)

Competition
Edition	32nd	32nd
Locations	28	28
Individual	37	37
Mixed	4	4
Cancelled	3	3

The 2025–26 FIS Snowboard World Cup, organized by the International Ski Federation (FIS), was the 32nd World Cup in snowboarding for men and women.

The season started on 28 November 2025 in Secret Garden, China and concluded on 28 March 2026 in Mont-Sainte-Anne, Canada.

This season included six disciplines: parallel slalom, parallel giant slalom, snowboard cross, halfpipe, slopestyle and big air.

== Men ==
=== Calendar ===
==== Snowboard Cross (SBX) ====
#	Date	Place	Winner	Second	Third	Discipline leader	R.
1	13 December 2025	(Italy) Cervinia	(France) Jonas Chollet	(France) Aidan Chollet	(Australia) Adam Lambert	(France) Jonas Chollet	
2	17 January 2026	(China) Dongbeiya	(Austria) Jakob Dusek	(Canada) Eliot Grondin	(Australia) Adam Lambert	(Australia) Adam Lambert	
3	18 January 2026	(China) Dongbeiya	(Australia) Adam Lambert	(Austria) Alessandro Hämmerle	(United States) Nathan Pare	(Australia) Adam Lambert	
4	6 March 2026	(Turkey) Erzurum	(Germany) Leon Ulbricht	(France) Aidan Chollet	(France) Loan Bozzolo	(Australia) Adam Lambert	
5	8 March 2026	(Turkey) Erzurum	(France) Aidan Chollet	(Germany) Leon Ulbricht	(France) Jonas Chollet	(Australia) Adam Lambert	
6	15 March 2026	(Austria) Montafon	(Austria) Jakob Dusek	(Germany) Leon Ulbricht	(France) Aidan Chollet	(Germany) Leon Ulbricht	
7	28 March 2026	(Canada) Mt. St. Anne	(Australia) Adam Lambert	(Germany) Leon Ulbricht	(Canada) Evan Bichon	(Germany) Leon Ulbricht	
	29 March 2026	(Canada) Mt. St. Anne	Cancelled				

==== Parallel (PSL/PGS) ====
#	Date	Place	Event	Winner	Second	Third	Discipline leader	R.
1	6 December 2025	(China) Mylin	PGS	(Italy) Maurizio Bormolini	(Austria) Benjamin Karl	(Italy) Aaron March	(Italy) Maurizio Bormolini	
2	7 December 2025	(China) Mylin	PGS	(Italy) Mirko Felicetti	(Germany) Stefan Baumeister	(Italy) Maurizio Bormolini	(Italy) Maurizio Bormolini	
3	13 December 2025	(Italy) Cortina d'Ampezzo	PGS	(Italy) Aaron March	(Austria) Benjamin Karl	(Italy) Maurizio Bormolini	(Italy) Maurizio Bormolini	
4	18 December 2025	(Italy) Carezza	PGS	(Italy) Roland Fischnaller	(Italy) Aaron March	(Italy) Mirko Felicetti	(Italy) Aaron March	
5	20 December 2025	(Switzerland) Davos	PSL	(Austria) Arvid Auner	(Italy) Gabriel Messner	(Italy) Aaron March	(Italy) Aaron March	
6	10 January 2026	(Switzerland) Scuol	PGS	(Italy) Roland Fischnaller	(Italy) Mirko Felicetti	(Slovenia) Tim Mastnak	(Italy) Aaron March	
7	13 January 2026	(Austria) Bad Gastein	PSL	(Italy) Maurizio Bormolini	(Bulgaria) Alexander Krashniak	(United States) Cody Winters	(Italy) Aaron March	
8	17 January 2026	(Bulgaria) Bansko	PGS	(Austria) Benjamin Karl	(Canada) Arnaud Gaudet	(Switzerland) Gian Casanova	(Italy) Aaron March	
9	18 January 2026	(Bulgaria) Bansko	PGS	(Bulgaria) Tervel Zamfirov	(Austria) Fabian Obmann	(Bulgaria) Radoslav Yankov	(Italy) Aaron March	
10	23 January 2026	(Austria) Simonhöhe	PGS	(Italy) Roland Fischnaller	(Austria) Fabian Obmann	(Italy) Aaron March	(Italy) Aaron March	
11	31 January 2026	(Slovenia) Rogla	PGS	(South Korea) Lee Sang-ho	(Italy) Roland Fischnaller	(Austria) Fabian Obmann	(Italy) Aaron March	
12	28 February 2026	(Poland) Krynica-Zdrój	PGS	(Italy) Maurizio Bormolini	(South Korea) Lee Sang-ho	(Canada) Arnaud Gaudet	(Italy) Maurizio Bormolini	
13	1 March 2026	(Poland) Krynica-Zdrój	PGS	(Italy) Maurizio Bormolini	(Germany) Stefan Baumeister	(Switzerland) Dario Caviezel	(Italy) Maurizio Bormolini	
14	7 March 2026	(Czech Republic) Špindlerův Mlýn	PSL	(Italy) Maurizio Bormolini	(Japan) Ryusuke Shinohara	(Italy) Mirko Felicetti	(Italy) Maurizio Bormolini	
	8 March 2026	(Czech Republic) Špindlerův Mlýn	PSL	Cancelled				
15	14 March 2026	(Canada) Val. St. Come	PGS	(Switzerland) Dario Caviezel	(Italy) Edwin Coratti	(Canada) Arnaud Gaudet	(Italy) Maurizio Bormolini	
16	15 March 2026	(Canada) Val. St. Come	PGS	(Austria) Benjamin Karl	(Italy) Maurizio Bormolini	(Italy) Mirko Felicetti	(Italy) Maurizio Bormolini	
17	21 March 2026	(Germany) Winterberg	PSL	(South Korea) Lee Sang-ho	(Austria) Christoph Karner	(Austria) Alexander Payer	(Italy) Maurizio Bormolini	

==== Halfpipe (HP) ====
#	Date	Place	Winner	Second	Third	Discipline leader	R.
1	11 December 2025	(China) Secret Garden	(Japan) Ayumu Hirano	(Japan) Yūto Totsuka	(Japan) Ruka Hirano	(Japan) Ayumu Hirano	
2	19 December 2025	(United States) Copper	(Japan) Ryusei Yamada	(Japan) Yūto Totsuka	(Australia) Valentino Guseli	(Japan) Yūto Totsuka	
3	3 January 2026	(Canada) Calgary	(Australia) Valentino Guseli	(Switzerland) David Hablützel	(Brazil) Patrick Burgener	(Australia) Valentino Guseli	
4	9 January 2026	(United States) Aspen	(Japan) Yūto Totsuka	(Japan) Shuichiro Shigeno	(United States) Alessandro Barbieri	(Japan) Yūto Totsuka	
5	17 January 2026	(Switzerland) Laax	(Australia) Scotty James	(New Zealand) Campbell Melville Ives	(Australia) Valentino Guseli	(Japan) Yūto Totsuka	
6	7 March 2026	(Japan) Ban-K	(Japan) Yūto Totsuka	(Australia) Valentino Guseli	(Japan) Ryusei Yamada	(Japan) Yūto Totsuka	
7	28 March 2026	(Switzerland) Silvaplana	(Japan) Yūto Totsuka	(Australia) Valentino Guseli	(United States) Chase Blackwell	(Japan) Yūto Totsuka	

==== Slopestyle (SS) ====
#	Date	Place	Winner	Second	Third	Discipline leader	R.
1	10 January 2026	(United States) Aspen	(United States) Jake Canter	(China) Su Yiming	(New Zealand) Dane Menzies	(United States) Jake Canter	
2	18 January 2026	(Switzerland) Laax	(France) Romain Allemand	(Japan) Yuto Kimura	(China) Su Yiming	(China) Su Yiming	
3	21 March 2026	(Austria) Flachau	(Canada) Eli Bouchard	(United States) Judd Henkes	(Japan) Hiroto Ogiwara	(China) Su Yiming	
	29 March 2026	(Switzerland) Silvaplana	Cancelled				

==== Big Air (BA) ====
#	Date	Place	Winner	Second	Third	Discipline leader	R.
1	28 November 2025	(China) Secret Garden	(China) Su Yiming	(China) Ge Chunyu	(Japan) Ryoma Kimata	(China) Su Yiming	
2	6 December 2025	(China) Beijing	(China) Su Yiming	(Japan) Kira Kimura	(Finland) Rene Rinnekangas	(China) Su Yiming	
3	13 December 2025	(United States) Steamboat	(Japan) Hiroto Ogiwara	(Japan) Kira Kimura	(United States) Oliver Martin	(China) Su Yiming	

=== Standings ===
==== Snowboard Cross ====
Rank	after all 7 events	Points
1	(Germany) Leon Ulbricht	435
2	(Australia) Adam Lambert	413
3	(France) Aidan Chollet	383
4	(France) Jonas Chollet	312
5	(Austria) Alessandro Hämmerle	295

==== Parallel Overall (PSL/PGS) ====
Rank	after all 17 events	Points
1	(Italy) Maurizio Bormolini	990
2	(Austria) Benjamin Karl	691
3	(Italy) Aaron March	670
4	(South Korea) Lee Sang-ho	592
5	(Austria) Fabian Obmann	553

==== Parallel slalom ====
Rank	after all 4 events	Points
1	(Italy) Maurizio Bormolini	277
2	(Italy) Gabriel Messner	169
3	(Italy) Aaron March	161
4	(Bulgaria) Alexander Krashniak	156
5	(Switzerland) Dario Caviezel	156

==== Parallel giant slalom ====
Rank	after all 13 events	Points
1	(Italy) Maurizio Bormolini	713
2	(Austria) Benjamin Karl	632
3	(Italy) Aaron March	509
4	(Italy) Roland Fischnaller	508
5	(Austria) Fabian Obmann	463

==== Park & Pipe Overall (BA/SS/HP) ====
Rank	after all 13 events	Points
1	(Japan) Yūto Totsuka	496
2	(Australia) Valentino Guseli	430
3	(China) Su Yiming	340
4	(Japan) Ryusei Yamada	271
5	(Japan) Kira Kimura	266

==== Halfpipe ====
Rank	after all 7 events	Points
1	(Japan) Yūto Totsuka	460
2	(Australia) Valentino Guseli	380
3	(Japan) Ryusei Yamada	271
4	(Japan) Ruka Hirano	232
5	(Brazil) Patrick Burgener	215

==== Slopestyle ====
Rank	after all 3 events	Points
1	(China) Su Yiming	140
2	(United States) Judd Henkes	139
3	(Japan) Yuto Kimura	135
4	(France) Romain Allemand	101
5	(United States) Jake Canter	100

==== Big Air ====
Rank	after all 3 events	Points
1	(China) Su Yiming	200
2	(Japan) Kira Kimura	189
3	(Japan) Yuto Miyamura	118
4	(Japan) Hiroto Ogiwara	116
5	(China) Ge Chunyu	112

== Women ==
=== Calendar ===
==== Snowboard Cross (SBX) ====
#	Date	Place	Winner	Second	Third	Discipline leader	R.
1	13 December 2025	(Italy) Cervinia	(France) Léa Casta	(Italy) Michela Moioli	(Australia) Josie Baff	(France) Léa Casta	
2	17 January 2026	(China) Dongbeiya	(United Kingdom) Charlotte Bankes	(Australia) Josie Baff	(France) Chloé Trespeuch	(Australia) Josie Baff	
3	18 January 2026	(China) Dongbeiya	(France) Julia Nirani-Pereira	(France) Chloé Trespeuch	(United Kingdom) Charlotte Bankes	(United Kingdom) Charlotte Bankes	
4	6 March 2026	(Turkey) Erzurum	(France) Léa Casta	(France) Chloé Trespeuch	(France) Julia Nirani-Pereira	(France) Léa Casta	
5	8 March 2026	(Turkey) Erzurum	(United Kingdom) Charlotte Bankes	(France) Léa Casta	(Switzerland) Noémie Wiedmer	(France) Léa Casta	
6	15 March 2026	(Austria) Montafon	(Switzerland) Sina Siegenthaler	(Australia) Josie Baff	(United Kingdom) Charlotte Bankes	(United Kingdom) Charlotte Bankes	
7	28 March 2026	(Canada) Mt. St. Anne	(United Kingdom) Charlotte Bankes	(France) Chloé Trespeuch	(Switzerland) Sina Siegenthaler	(United Kingdom) Charlotte Bankes	
	29 March 2026	(Canada) Mt. St. Anne	Cancelled				

==== Parallel (PSL/PGS) ====
#	Date	Place	Event	Winner	Second	Third	Discipline leader	R.
1	6 December 2025	(China) Mylin	PGS	(Italy) Lucia Dalmasso	(Italy) Elisa Caffont	(Bulgaria) Malena Zamfirova	(Italy) Lucia Dalmasso	
2	7 December 2025	(China) Mylin	PGS	(Japan) Tsubaki Miki	(Switzerland) Julie Zogg	(Austria) Sabine Payer	(Italy) Lucia Dalmasso (Japan) Tsubaki Miki	
3	13 December 2025	(Italy) Cortina d'Ampezzo	PGS	(Austria) Sabine Payer	(Canada) Kaylie Buck	(Czech Republic) Zuzana Maděrová	(Austria) Sabine Payer	
4	18 December 2025	(Italy) Carezza	PGS	(Austria) Sabine Payer	(Poland) Aleksandra Król-Walas	(Japan) Tsubaki Miki	(Austria) Sabine Payer	
5	20 December 2025	(Switzerland) Davos	PSL	(Italy) Elisa Caffont	(Czech Republic) Zuzana Maděrová	(Japan) Tsubaki Miki	(Austria) Sabine Payer	
6	10 January 2026	(Switzerland) Scuol	PGS	(Germany) Ramona Hofmeister	(Italy) Elisa Caffont	(Germany) Melanie Hochreiter	(Austria) Sabine Payer	
7	13 January 2026	(Austria) Bad Gastein	PSL	(Italy) Lucia Dalmasso	(Netherlands) Michelle Dekker	(Poland) Aleksandra Król-Walas	(Italy) Elisa Caffont	
8	17 January 2026	(Bulgaria) Bansko	PGS	(Germany) Ramona Hofmeister	(Poland) Aleksandra Król-Walas	(Japan) Tsubaki Miki	(Italy) Elisa Caffont	
9	18 January 2026	(Bulgaria) Bansko	PGS	(Italy) Elisa Caffont	(Japan) Tsubaki Miki	(Germany) Ramona Hofmeister	(Italy) Elisa Caffont	
10	23 January 2026	(Austria) Simonhöhe	PGS	(Czech Republic) Ester Ledecká	(Netherlands) Michelle Dekker	(Czech Republic) Zuzana Maděrová	(Japan) Tsubaki Miki (Italy) Elisa Caffont	
11	31 January 2026	(Slovenia) Rogla	PGS	(Japan) Tsubaki Miki	(Germany) Ramona Hofmeister	(Italy) Elisa Caffont	(Japan) Tsubaki Miki	
12	28 February 2026	(Poland) Krynica-Zdrój	PGS	(Japan) Tsubaki Miki	(Czech Republic) Zuzana Maděrová	(Germany) Ramona Hofmeister	(Japan) Tsubaki Miki	
13	1 March 2026	(Poland) Krynica-Zdrój	PGS	(Austria) Sabine Payer	(Italy) Lucia Dalmasso	(Bulgaria) Malena Zamfirova	(Japan) Tsubaki Miki	
14	7 March 2026	(Czech Republic) Špindlerův Mlýn	PSL	(Japan) Tsubaki Miki	(Czech Republic) Zuzana Maděrová	(Netherlands) Michelle Dekker	(Japan) Tsubaki Miki	
	8 March 2026	(Czech Republic) Špindlerův Mlýn	PSL	Cancelled				
15	14 March 2026	(Canada) Val. St. Come	PGS	(Germany) Ramona Hofmeister	(Japan) Tsubaki Miki	(Italy) Lucia Dalmasso	(Japan) Tsubaki Miki	
16	15 March 2026	(Canada) Val. St. Come	PGS	(Italy) Lucia Dalmasso	(Italy) Jasmin Coratti	(Germany) Ramona Hofmeister	(Japan) Tsubaki Miki	
17	21 March 2026	(Germany) Winterberg	PSL	(Italy) Lucia Dalmasso	(Austria) Sabine Payer	(Netherlands) Michelle Dekker	(Japan) Tsubaki Miki	

==== Halfpipe (HP) ====
#	Date	Place	Winner	Second	Third	Discipline leader	R.
1	11 December 2025	(China) Secret Garden	(South Korea) Choi Ga-on	(Japan) Rise Kudo	(China) Cai Xuetong	(South Korea) Choi Ga-on	
2	19 December 2025	(United States) Copper	(South Korea) Choi Ga-on	(Japan) Sena Tomita	(United States) Bea Kim	(South Korea) Choi Ga-on	
3	3 January 2026	(Canada) Calgary	(Canada) Elizabeth Hosking	(China) Wu Shaotong	(Switzerland) Isabelle Lötscher	(South Korea) Choi Ga-on	
4	9 January 2026	(United States) Aspen	(Japan) Mitsuki Ono	(United States) Maddy Schaffrick	(Japan) Sena Tomita	(South Korea) Choi Ga-on	
5	17 January 2026	(Switzerland) Laax	(South Korea) Choi Ga-on	(Japan) Rise Kudo	(China) Cai Xuetong	(South Korea) Choi Ga-on	
6	7 March 2026	(Japan) Ban-K	(Japan) Mitsuki Ono	(Japan) Sena Tomita	(Japan) Sara Shimizu	(South Korea) Choi Ga-on	
7	28 March 2026	(Switzerland) Silvaplana	(United States) Maddie Mastro	(United States) Maddy Schaffrick	(Spain) Queralt Castellet	(South Korea) Choi Ga-on	

==== Slopestyle (SS) ====
#	Date	Place	Winner	Second	Third	Discipline leader	R.
1	10 January 2026	(United States) Aspen	(Canada) Laurie Blouin	(Japan) Mari Fukada	(Japan) Kokomo Murase	(Canada) Laurie Blouin	
2	18 January 2026	(Switzerland) Laax	(Japan) Kokomo Murase	(United States) Lily Dhawornvej	(Austria) Anna Gasser	(Japan) Kokomo Murase	
3	21 March 2026	(Austria) Flachau	(United Kingdom) Mia Brookes	(Austria) Anna Gasser	(United States) Lily Dhawornvej	(United States) Lily Dhawornvej	
	29 March 2026	(Switzerland) Silvaplana	Cancelled				

==== Big Air (BA) ====
#	Date	Place	Winner	Second	Third	Discipline leader	R.
1	28 November 2025	(China) Secret Garden	(Japan) Mari Fukada	(Japan) Reira Iwabuchi	(Japan) Miyabi Onitsuka	(Japan) Mari Fukada	
2	6 December 2025	(China) Beijing	(United Kingdom) Mia Brookes	(Austria) Hanna Karrer	(Japan) Momo Suzuki	(Japan) Miyabi Onitsuka	
3	13 December 2025	(United States) Steamboat	(Japan) Miyabi Onitsuka	(South Korea) Yu Seung-eun	(Australia) Ally Hickman	(Japan) Miyabi Onitsuka	

=== Standings ===
==== Snowboard Cross ====
Rank	after all 7 events	Points
1	(United Kingdom) Charlotte Bankes	473
2	(France) Chloé Trespeuch	395
3	(France) Léa Casta	386
4	(Australia) Josie Baff	368
5	(France) Julia Nirani-Pereira	322

==== Parallel Overall (PSL/PGS) ====
Rank	after all 17 events	Points
1	(Japan) Tsubaki Miki	1019
2	(Italy) Lucia Dalmasso	947
3	(Italy) Elisa Caffont	847
4	(Austria) Sabine Payer	802
5	(Czech Republic) Zuzana Maděrová	722

==== Parallel slalom ====
Rank	after all 4 events	Points
1	(Italy) Lucia Dalmasso	285
2	(Japan) Tsubaki Miki	226
3	(Czech Republic) Zuzana Maděrová	225
4	(Netherlands) Michelle Dekker	224
5	(Italy) Elisa Caffont	210

==== Parallel giant slalom ====
Rank	after all 13 events	Points
1	(Japan) Tsubaki Miki	793
2	(Italy) Lucia Dalmasso	662
3	(Italy) Elisa Caffont	637
4	(Austria) Sabine Payer	636
5	(Germany) Ramona Hofmeister	634

==== Park & Pipe Overall (BA/SS/HP) ====
Rank	after all 13 events	Points
1	(South Korea) Choi Ga-on	300
2	(Japan) Rise Kudo	296
3	(Japan) Sena Tomita	278
4	(Japan) Mitsuki Ono	265
5	(United States) Lily Dhawornvej	252

==== Halfpipe ====
Rank	after all 7 events	Points
1	(South Korea) Choi Ga-on	300
2	(Japan) Rise Kudo	296
3	(Japan) Sena Tomita	278
4	(Japan) Mitsuki Ono	265
5	(United States) Maddy Schaffrick	205

==== Slopestyle ====
Rank	after all 3 events	Points
1	(United States) Lily Dhawornvej	169
2	(Japan) Kokomo Murase	160
3	(Austria) Anna Gasser	140
4	(Japan) Mari Fukada	116
5	(United Kingdom) Mia Brookes	100

==== Big Air ====
Rank	after all 3 events	Points
1	(Japan) Miyabi Onitsuka	205
2	(South Korea) Yu Seung-eun	121
3	(Japan) Mari Fukada	104
4	(Australia) Ally Hickman	103
5	(United Kingdom) Mia Brookes	100

== Team ==
=== Parallel team (PRT) ===
#	Date	Place	Event	Winner	Second	Third	Discipline leader	R.
1	14 January 2026	(Austria) Bad Gastein	PSL	Italy 2 Aaron March; Lucia Dalmasso	Switzerland 1 Dario Caviezel; Julie Zogg	Italy 3 Gabriel Messner; Jasmin Coratti	Italy 2 Aaron March; Lucia Dalmasso	
2	24 January 2026	(Austria) Simonhöhe	PGS	Austria 4 Andreas Prommegger; Sabine Payer	Italy 2 Aaron March; Lucia Dalmasso	United States 1 Walker Overstake; Iris Pflum	Italy 2 Aaron March; Lucia Dalmasso	
3	22 March 2026	(Germany) Winterberg	PSL	Italy 2 Aaron March; Lucia Dalmasso	Austria 1 Andreas Prommegger; Sabine Payer	Canada 1 Arnaud Gaudet; Aurélie Moisan	Italy 2 Aaron March; Lucia Dalmasso	

=== Snowboard Cross team (BXT) ===
#	Date	Place	Winner	Second	Third	Discipline leader	R.
1	14 December 2025	(Italy) Cervinia	Great Britain 1 Huw Nightingale; Charlotte Bankes	Italy Lorenzo Sommariva; Michela Moioli	France 2 Aidan Chollet; Chloé Trespeuch	Great Britain 1 Huw Nightingale; Charlotte Bankes	

== Nations Cup ==
=== Snowboard Cross (SBX/BXT) ===
Rank	after all 15 events	Points
1	France	3,070
2	Australia	1,285
3	Switzerland	956
4	Austria	945
5	Germany	860
6	Italy	763
7	United States	712
8	United Kingdom	702
9	Canada	576
10	Czech Republic	378

=== Snowboard Alpine (PSL/PGS/PRT) ===
Rank	after all 37 events	Points
1	Italy	6,687
2	Austria	4,537
3	Switzerland	2,349
4	Germany	2,249
5	Canada	1,561
6	Japan	1,494
7	Bulgaria	1,324
8	Czech Republic	910
9	Poland	899
10	South Korea	871

=== Park & Pipe (HP/SS/BA) ===
Rank	after all 26 events	Points
1	Japan	5,150
2	United States	2,983
3	China	1,636
4	Australia	1,310
5	Canada	1,144
6	Switzerland	998
7	South Korea	750
8	Germany	517
9	New Zealand	502
10	Austria	402

== Podium table by nation ==
Table showing the World Cup podium places (gold–1st place, silver–2nd place, bronze–3rd place) by the countries represented by the athletes.

Rank	Nation	Gold	Silver	Bronze	Total
1	Italy	18	13	11	42
2	Japan	15	15	12	42
3	Austria	9	9	3	21
4	France	6	6	6	18
5	Great Britain	6	0	2	8
6	South Korea	5	2	0	7
7	Germany	4	6	4	14
8	Australia	4	4	6	14
9	Canada	3	4	5	12
10	United States	2	4	8	14
11	Switzerland	2	3	5	10
12	China	2	3	3	8
13	Czech Republic	1	3	2	6
14	Bulgaria	1	1	3	5
15	Netherlands	0	2	2	4
16	Poland	0	2	1	3
17	New Zealand	0	1	1	2
18	Brazil	0	0	1	1
18	Finland	0	0	1	1
18	Slovenia	0	0	1	1
18	Spain	0	0	1	1
Totals (21 entries)		78	78	78	234

== Achievements ==
First World Cup career victory

Men

- (France) Jonas Chollet (17) – Snowboard Cross in Cervinia
- (Japan) Ryusei Yamada (19) – Halfpipe in Copper
- (United States) Jake Canter (22) – Slopestyle in Aspen
- (Australia) Adam Lambert (28) – Snowboard Cross in Dongbeiya
- (Bulgaria) Tervel Zamfirov (20) – Parallel Giant Slalom in Bansko
- (France) Romain Allemand (19) – Slopestyle in Laax

Women

- (Italy) Elisa Caffont (26) – Parallel Slalom in Davos
- (Canada) Elizabeth Hosking (24) – Halfpipe in Calgary

First World Cup career podium

Men

- (China) Ge Chunyu (19) – Big Air in Secret Garden
- (France) Jonas Chollet (17) – Snowboard Cross in Cervinia
- (Switzerland) David Hablützel (29) – Halfpipe in Calgary
- (New Zealand) Dane Menzies (20) – Slopestyle in Aspen
- (Bulgaria) Alexander Krashniak (21) – Parallel Slalom in Bad Gastein
- (Canada) Arnaud Gaudet (25) – Parallel Giant Slalom in Bansko
- (Switzerland) Gian Casanova (25) – Parallel Giant Slalom in Bansko
- (Bulgaria) Tervel Zamfirov (20) – Parallel Giant Slalom in Bansko
- (Japan) Yuto Kimura (17) – Slopestyle in Laax
- (Japan) Ryusuke Shinohara (24) – Parallel Slalom in Špindlerův Mlýn
- (Austria) Christoph Karner (22) – Parallel Slalom in Winterberg
- (Canada) Evan Bichon (27) – Snowboard Cross in Mt. St. Anne

Women

- (Austria) Hanna Karrer (17) – Big Air in Beijing
- (Japan) Rise Kudo (16) – Halfpipe in Secret Garden
- (Canada) Kaylie Buck (25) – Parallel Giant Slalom in Cortina d'Ampezzo
- (South Korea) Yu Seung-eun (17) – Big Air in Steamboat
- (Australia) Ally Hickman (16) – Big Air in Steamboat
- (Switzerland) Isabelle Lötscher (21) – Halfpipe in Calgary
- (United States) Lily Dhawornvej (16) – Slopestyle in Laax
- (Switzerland) Noémie Wiedmer (18) – Snowboard Cross in Erzurum
