= Snowboarding at the 2026 Winter Olympics =

Snowboarding at the XXV Olympic Winter Games
- Snowboarding pictogram
- Venue: Livigno Snow Park
- Dates: 5–18 February 2026

Snowboarding at the 2026 Winter Olympics was held at the Livigno Snow Park in Valtellina, Italy between 5 and 18 February 2026. A total of 11 snowboarding events were held.

== Competition schedule ==
The following is the competition schedule for all eleven events. Sessions that included the event finals are shown in bold.

All times are (UTC+1).

Date	Time	Event
5 February	19:30	Men's big air
7 February	19:30	**Men's big air**
8 February	09:30	**Women's** and **men's parallel giant slalom**
8 February	19:30	Women's big air
9 February	19:30	**Women's big air**
11 February	10:30	Women's and men's halfpipe
12 February	10:00	**Men's snowboard cross**
12 February	19:30	**Women's halfpipe**
13 February	10:00	**Women's snowboard cross**
13 February	19:30	**Men's halfpipe**
15 February	10:15	Men's slopestyle
15 February	13:45	**Mixed team snowboard cross**
15 February	14:35	Women's slopestyle
18 February	12:30	**Men's slopestyle**
18 February	14:30	**Women's slopestyle**

== Medal summary ==
=== Medal table ===
* Host nation (Italy)

Rank	Nation	Gold	Silver	Bronze	Total
1	Japan	4	2	3	9
2	Austria	2	1	1	4
3	South Korea	1	1	1	3
4	Australia	1	1	0	2
4	Czech Republic	1	1	0	2
6	China	1	0	1	2
7	Great Britain	1	0	0	1
8	New Zealand	0	2	0	2
9	Italy*	0	1	2	3
10	United States	0	1	1	2
11	Canada	0	1	0	1
12	Bulgaria	0	0	1	1
12	France	0	0	1	1
Totals (13 entries)		**11**	**11**	**11**	**33**

=== Medalists ===
==== Men's events ====
Event	Gold		Silver		Bronze	
Big air	Kira Kimura; Japan	179.50	Ryoma Kimata; Japan	171.50	Su Yiming; China	168.50
Halfpipe	Yūto Totsuka; Japan	95.00	Scotty James; Australia	93.50	Ryusei Yamada; Japan	92.00
Slopestyle	Su Yiming; China	82.41	Taiga Hasegawa; Japan	82.13	Jake Canter; United States	79.36
Parallel giant slalom	Benjamin Karl; Austria		Kim Sang-kyum; South Korea		Tervel Zamfirov; Bulgaria	
Snowboard cross	Alessandro Hämmerle; Austria		Éliot Grondin; Canada		Jakob Dusek; Austria	

==== Women's events ====
Event	Gold		Silver		Bronze	
Big air	Kokomo Murase; Japan	179.00	Zoi Sadowski-Synnott; New Zealand	172.25	Yu Seung-eun; South Korea	171.00
Halfpipe	Choi Ga-on; South Korea	90.25	Chloe Kim; United States	88.00	Mitsuki Ono; Japan	85.00
Slopestyle	Mari Fukada; Japan	87.83	Zoi Sadowski-Synnott; New Zealand	87.48	Kokomo Murase; Japan	85.80
Parallel giant slalom	Zuzana Maděrová; Czech Republic		Sabine Payer; Austria		Lucia Dalmasso; Italy	
Snowboard cross	Josie Baff; Australia		Eva Adamczyková; Czech Republic		Michela Moioli; Italy	

==== Mixed ====
Event	Gold	Silver	Bronze
Team snowboard cross	Great Britain; Huw Nightingale; Charlotte Bankes	Italy; Lorenzo Sommariva; Michela Moioli	France; Loan Bozzolo; Léa Casta
