= Francis Jobin =

Francis Jobin may refer to:

- Francis Laurence Jobin, Canadian politician and lieutenant governor of Manitoba
- Francis Jobin (snowboarder), Canadian snowboarder
