= Snowboarding at the 2024 Winter Youth Olympics – Men's big air =

Men's big air at the IV Winter Youth Olympic Games
- Venue: Welli Hilli Park
- Dates: 27–28 January
- Competitors: 21 from 15 nations
- Winning points: 183.25

Medalists
1st place, gold medalist(s)		Eli Bouchard	Canada
2nd place, silver medalist(s)		Oliver Martin	United States
3rd place, bronze medalist(s)		Campbell Melville Ives	New Zealand

The men's big air event in snowboarding at the 2024 Winter Youth Olympics took place on 27 and 28 January at the Welli Hilli Park.

== Qualification ==
The qualification was started at 13:15.

Rank	Bib	Name	Country	Run 1	Run 2	Best	Notes
1	3	Eli Bouchard	Canada	96.00	31.00	96.00	Q
2	7	Luca Mérimée-Mantovani	France	90.50	24.25	90.50	Q
3	1	Romain Allemand	France	85.75	89.25	89.25	Q
4	6	Campbell Melville Ives	New Zealand	88.00	16.00	88.00	Q
5	8	Txema Mazet-Brown	New Zealand	84.75	25.25	84.75	Q
6	5	Oliver Martin	United States	83.00	28.25	83.00	Q
7	2	Brooklyn DePriest	United States	76.00	82.00	82.00	Q
8	20	Ge Chunyu	China	81.00	29.00	81.00	Q
9	11	Niklas Sukke	Norway	72.75	16.00	72.75	Q
10	17	Tadeáš Nedielka	Slovakia	55.50	70.25	70.25	Q
11	13	Gregorio Marchelli	Italy	68.00	22.50	68.00	
12	9	Neko Reimer	Canada	17.25	54.25	54.25	
13	18	Benjamin Villegas	Chile	13.25	53.50	53.50	
14	16	Mischa Zürcher	Switzerland	35.75	52.75	52.75	
15	15	Aljaž Sladič	Slovenia	51.00	45.00	51.00	
16	14	Reef Hasler	Switzerland	47.75	14.25	47.75	
17	19	Teiva Hamaini	Great Britain	40.00	39.25	40.00	
18	12	Milo Botterill	Australia	8.50	34.00	34.00	
19	21	Felix Fulterer	Italy	19.25	25.50	25.50	
20	10	Erik Jurmu	Finland	10.00	10.25	10.25	
21	4	Lee Chae-un	South Korea	Did not start			

== Final ==
The final was started at 13:55.

Rank	Bib	Name	Country	Run 1	Run 2	Run 3	Total
1st place, gold medalist(s)	3	Eli Bouchard	Canada	92.25	91.00	42.00	183.25
2nd place, silver medalist(s)	5	Oliver Martin	United States	97.25	80.75	82.25	179.50
3rd place, bronze medalist(s)	6	Campbell Melville Ives	New Zealand	82.75	70.25	25.00	153.00
4	7	Luca Mérimée-Mantovani	France	76.00	48.50	31.50	124.50
5	17	Tadeáš Nedielka	Slovakia	20.00	73.25	47.50	120.75
6	20	Ge Chunyu	China	80.25	21.50	14.25	101.75
7	1	Romain Allemand	France	23.75	24.50	94.75	94.75
8	2	Brooklyn DePriest	United States	25.00	43.75	19.50	63.25
9	8	Txema Mazet-Brown	New Zealand	21.75	17.50	21.50	21.75
10	11	Niklas Sukke	Norway	Did not start			
