= Snowboarding at the 2026 Winter Olympics – Women's parallel giant slalom =

Women's parallel giant slalom at the XXV Olympic Winter Games
- Snowboarding
- Venue: Livigno Snow Park, Valtellina
- Date: 8 February

Medalists
| 1st place, gold medalist(s) | | Zuzana Maděrová | Czech Republic |
| 2nd place, silver medalist(s) | | Sabine Payer | Austria |
| 3rd place, bronze medalist(s) | | Lucia Dalmasso | Italy |

The women's parallel giant slalom competition in snowboarding at the 2026 Winter Olympics was held on 8 February, at the Livigno Snow Park in Valtellina. Zuzana Maděrová, representing the Czech Republic, won the event. Sabine Payer of Austria won the silver and Lucia Dalmasso of Italy bronze. For all of them, these were the first Olympic medals.

== Background ==
The 2018 and 2022 champion Ester Ledecká and the bronze medalist, Gloria Kotnik, qualified for the event. The silver medalist, Daniela Ulbing, did not qualify. Tsubaki Miki was leading the 2025–26 FIS Snowboard World Cup standings in women's parallel giant slalom, and Elisa Caffont in parallel slalom. The 2025 World champion in parallel giant slalom was Ester Ledecká.

== Summary ==
Kotnik ended up the 17th in the qualification and thus did not qualify for the finals. Ledecká, Tsubaki and Caffont did. Ledecká lost in a quarterfinal, which ended her quest of becoming the first triple Olympic champion in women's snowboard. Miki lost to Caffont in another quarterfinal. The semifinals set Lucia Dalmasso against Sabine Payer and Caffont against Zuzana Maděrová. Maděrová won the final against Payer after the Austrian made a mistake early in the run.

== Results ==
=== Qualification run ===
The qualification was started at 09:00.

| Rank | Bib | Name | Country | Blue course | Red course | Total | Notes |
|---|---|---|---|---|---|---|---|
| 1 | 36 | Ester Ledecká | Czech Republic | 45.04 | 45.75 | 1:30.79 | Q |
| 2 | 18 | Zuzana Maděrová | Czech Republic | 45.38 | 46.10 | 1:31.48 | Q |
| 3 | 26 | Tsubaki Miki | Japan | 45.62 | 47.25 | 1:32.87 | Q |
| 4 | 30 | Lucia Dalmasso | Italy | 46.39 | 46.67 | 1:33.06 | Q |
| 5 | 27 | Aleksandra Król-Walas | Poland | 46.81 | 46.37 | 1:33.18 | Q |
| 6 | 31 | Elisa Caffont | Italy | 46.79 | 46.59 | 1:33.38 | Q |
| 7 | 19 | Ramona Theresia Hofmeister | Germany | 46.72 | 46.75 | 1:33.47 | Q |
| 8 | 28 | Michelle Dekker | Netherlands | 46.22 | 47.41 | 1:33.63 | Q |
| 9 | 21 | Sabine Payer | Austria | 46.73 | 47.02 | 1:33.75 | Q |
| 10 | 32 | Malena Zamfirova | Bulgaria | 46.89 | 47.40 | 1:34.29 | Q |
| 11 | 29 | Julie Zogg | Switzerland | 47.69 | 46.67 | 1:34.36 | Q |
| 12 | 17 | Aurélie Moisan | Canada | 48.24 | 46.32 | 1:34.56 | Q |
| 13 | 20 | Jasmin Coratti | Italy | 47.30 | 47.70 | 1:35.00 | Q |
| 14 | 33 | Kaylie Buck | Canada | 47.96 | 47.38 | 1:35.34 | Q |
| 15 | 25 | Cheyenne Loch | Germany | 48.50 | 46.90 | 1:35.40 | Q |
| 16 | 22 | Claudia Riegler | Austria | 47.35 | 48.08 | 1:35.43 | Q |
| 17 | 34 | Gloria Kotnik | Slovenia | 47.66 | 47.77 | 1:35.43 | |
| 18 | 37 | Flurina Neva Bätschi | Switzerland | 48.01 | 47.67 | 1:35.68 | |
| 19 | 45 | Xenia von Siebenthal | Switzerland | 47.84 | 48.02 | 1:35.86 | |
| 20 | 38 | Melanie Hochreiter | Germany | 47.80 | 48.84 | 1:36.64 | |
| 21 | 41 | Gong Naiying | China | 48.74 | 48.12 | 1:36.86 | |
| 22 | 39 | Tomoka Takeuchi | Japan | 48.00 | 48.88 | 1:36.88 | |
| 23 | 35 | Martina Ankele | Austria | 49.00 | 48.58 | 1:37.58 | |
| 23 | 23 | Ladina Caviezel | Switzerland | 48.88 | 48.70 | 1:37.58 | |
| 25 | 46 | Dong Yuyue | China | 49.35 | 48.79 | 1:38.14 | |
| 26 | 47 | Mathilda Scheid | Germany | 49.12 | 49.51 | 1:38.63 | |
| 27 | 43 | Maria Bukowska-Chyc | Poland | 49.34 | 49.83 | 1:39.17 | |
| 28 | 42 | Bai Xinhui | China | 47.56 | 51.66 | 1:39.22 | |
| 29 | 24 | Annamari Dancha | Ukraine | 49.39 | 50.00 | 1:39.39 | |
| 30 | 40 | Iris Pflum | United States | 50.42 | 49.66 | 1:40.08 | |
| 31 | 44 | Jeong Hae-rim | South Korea | 49.78 | 50.77 | 1:40.55 | |
| 32 | 48 | Sofia Valle | Italy | 50.87 | 49.74 | 1:40.61 | |

=== Final ===
1/8 finals
4 Dalmasso (ITA)
13 Coratti (ITA) | +0.06
5 Król-Walas (POL)
12 Moisan (CAN) | +0.36
8 Dekker (NED) | +0.13
9 Payer (AUT)
1 Ledecká (CZE)
16 Riegler (AUT) | +1.13
2 Maděrová (CZE)
15 Loch (GER) | +0.36
7 Hofmeister (GER)
10 Zamfirova (BUL) | +0.02
6 Caffont (ITA)
11 Zogg (SUI) | +0.47
3 Miki (JPN)
14 Buck (CAN) | +0.22

Quarterfinals
4 Dalmasso (ITA)
5 Król-Walas (POL) | +0.26
9 Payer (AUT)
1 Ledecká (CZE) | +0.06
2 Maděrová (CZE)
7 Hofmeister (GER) | DNF
6 Caffont (ITA)
3 Miki (JPN) | +0.02

Semifinals
4 Dalmasso (ITA) | +0.23
9 Payer (AUT)
2 Maděrová (CZE)
6 Caffont (ITA) | +0.45

Final
9 Payer (AUT) | +0.83
2 Maděrová (CZE)
Third place
4 Dalmasso (ITA)
6 Caffont (ITA) | +0.11
