= Snowboarding at the 2020 Winter Youth Olympics – Boys' big air =

Boys' big air at the III Winter Youth Olympic Games
- Venue: Leysin Park & Pipe
- Dates: 22 January
- Competitors: 20 from 15 nations
- Winning points: 195.00

Medalists
1st place, gold medalist(s)		Ryoma Kimata	Japan
2nd place, silver medalist(s)		Aoto Kawakami	Japan
3rd place, bronze medalist(s)		Liam Brearley	Canada

The boys' big air event in snowboarding at the 2020 Winter Youth Olympics took place on 22 January at the Leysin Park & Pipe.

== Qualification ==
The qualification was started at 09:30.

Rank	Bib	Name	Country	Run 1	Run 2	Best	Notes
1	4	Ryoma Kimata	Japan	95.75	36.50	95.75	Q
2	1	Dusty Henricksen	United States	90.50	86.75	90.50	Q
3	14	Mitchell Davern	New Zealand	85.25	54.75	85.25	Q
4	3	Liam Brearley	Canada	84.00	73.50	84.00	Q
5	6	Aoto Kawakami	Japan	14.50	80.00	80.00	Q
6	12	Yaroslav Lenchevskiy	Russia	78.75	22.75	78.75	Q
7	10	Aatu Partanen	Finland	73.75	4.75	73.75	Q
8	7	Liam Gill	Canada	67.25	70.75	70.75	Q
9	11	Till Strohmeyer	Germany	70.50	16.75	70.50	Q
10	13	Will Healy	United States	60.25	70.25	70.25	Q
11	2	Nick Pünter	Switzerland	69.75	14.25	69.75	Q
12	18	Lukas Frischhut	Austria	69.50	15.50	69.50	Q
13	21	William Mathisen	Sweden	64.75	19.00	64.75	
14	22	Alessandro Lotorto	Switzerland	15.50	58.75	58.75	
15	9	Sunny Steele	Australia	8.25	48.25	48.25	
16	17	Valentín Moreno	Argentina	5.75	41.25	41.25	
17	19	Leopold Frey	Germany	11.00	30.50	30.50	
18	5	Álvaro Yáñez	Chile	20.25	22.75	22.75	
19	15	Motiejus Morauskas	Lithuania	11.50	13.00	13.00	
20	16	Ožbe Kuhar	Slovenia	12.00	12.75	12.75	
	8	Jack Coyne	United States	Did not start			
	20	Valtteri Kautonen	Finland	Did not start			

== Final ==
The final was started at 13:50.

Rank	Start order	Bib	Name	Country	Run 1	Run 2	Run 3	Total
1st place, gold medalist(s)	12	4	Ryoma Kimata	Japan	96.50	98.50	37.00	195.00
2nd place, silver medalist(s)	8	6	Aoto Kawakami	Japan	79.25	96.00	95.75	191.75
3rd place, bronze medalist(s)	9	3	Liam Brearley	Canada	91.25	92.00	32.25	183.25
4	11	1	Dusty Henricksen	United States	94.25	82.50	28.50	176.75
5	10	14	Mitchell Davern	New Zealand	84.75	80.00	94.75	174.75
6	3	13	Will Healy	United States	12.75	61.75	66.25	128.00
7	7	12	Yaroslav Lenchevskiy	Russia	68.25	32.75	14.25	101.00
8	5	7	Liam Gill	Canada	75.75	13.00	12.25	88.75
9	2	2	Nick Pünter	Switzerland	28.25	37.75	3.50	66.00
10	1	18	Lukas Frischhut	Austria	16.25	14.00	41.00	41.00
11	4	11	Till Strohmeyer	Germany	18.50	8.00	14.75	18.50
	6	10	Aatu Partanen	Finland	Did not start			
