= Snowboarding at the 2024 Winter Youth Olympics – Men's slopestyle =

Men's slopestyle at the IV Winter Youth Olympic Games
- Venue: Welli Hilli Park
- Dates: 25 January
- Competitors: 23 from 15 nations
- Winning points: 96.00

Medalists
1st place, gold medalist(s)		Lee Chae-un	South Korea
2nd place, silver medalist(s)		Eli Bouchard	Canada
3rd place, bronze medalist(s)		Romain Allemand	France

The men's slopestyle event in snowboarding at the 2024 Winter Youth Olympics took place on 25 January at the Welli Hilli Park.

== Qualification ==
The qualification was started at 9:45.

Rank	Bib	Name	Country	Run 1	Run 2	Best	Notes
1	3	Eli Bouchard	Canada	83.25	59.50	83.25	Q
2	8	Campbell Melville Ives	New Zealand	57.25	80.00	80.00	Q
3	2	Brooklyn DePriest	United States	47.75	78.00	78.00	Q
4	1	Romain Allemand	France	71.25	40.50	71.25	Q
5	9	Neko Reimer	Canada	8.50	65.50	65.50	Q
6	4	Oliver Martin	United States	63.25	33.00	63.25	Q
7	5	Lee Chae-un	South Korea	58.50	29.25	58.50	Q
8	15	Reef Hasler	Switzerland	44.50	55.50	55.50	Q
9	11	Erik Jurmu	Finland	53.25	23.25	53.25	Q
10	24	Ge Chunyu	China	42.50	21.25	42.50	Q
11	23	Felix Fulterer	Italy	14.50	41.00	41.00	
12	17	Mischa Zürcher	Switzerland	39.75	29.50	39.75	
13	10	Luca Mérimée-Mantovani	France	36.00	5.50	36.00	
14	22	Teiva Hamaini	Great Britain	33.75	18.25	33.75	
15	18	Tadeáš Nedielka	Slovakia	19.25	32.75	32.75	
16	16	Joshua Li	New Zealand	31.75	22.25	31.75	
17	13	Niklas Sukke	Norway	17.25	28.75	28.75	
18	14	Gregorio Marchelli	Italy	26.25	15.00	26.25	
19	7	Txema Mazet-Brown	New Zealand	4.00	18.50	18.50	
20	12	Milo Botterill	Australia	6.50	18.00	18.00	
21	21	Benjamin Villegas	Chile	12.50	17.50	17.50	
22	20	Aljaž Sladič	Slovenia	16.25	11.50	16.25	
23	6	Lee Dong-heon	South Korea	15.25	9.50	15.25	

== Final ==
The final was started at 14:51.

Rank	Bib	Name	Country	Run 1	Run 2	Run 3	Total
1st place, gold medalist(s)	5	Lee Chae-un	South Korea	91.50	37.50	96.00	96.00
2nd place, silver medalist(s)	3	Eli Bouchard	Canada	87.25	90.00	82.25	90.00
3rd place, bronze medalist(s)	1	Romain Allemand	France	85.50	89.25	34.25	89.25
4	8	Campbell Melville Ives	New Zealand	71.00	30.75	89.00	89.00
5	4	Oliver Martin	United States	81.25	82.25	18.25	82.25
6	2	Brooklyn DePriest	United States	26.00	21.25	68.00	68.00
7	11	Erik Jurmu	Finland	50.75	21.75	20.75	50.75
8	15	Reef Hasler	Switzerland	12.75	49.00	10.25	49.00
9	24	Ge Chunyu	China	21.00	48.00	32.00	48.00
10	9	Neko Reimer	Canada	8.25	16.00	21.25	21.25
