= Lucia Dalmasso =

Italian snowboarder (born 1997)

Personal information
- Born: 28 May 1997 (age 29) Falcade, Italy

Sport
- Country: Italy
- Sport: Snowboarding
- Event(s): Parallel slalom, parallel giant slalom
- Coached by: Rudy Galli
Medal record
Women's snowboarding
Representing Italy
Olympic Games
Bronze medal – third place	2026 Milano Cortina	Parallel giant slalom

Lucia Dalmasso (born 28 May 1997) is an Italian snowboarder specializing in parallel slalom and parallel giant slalom disciplines. She represented Italy at the 2022 and 2026 Winter Olympics.

== Career ==
Dalmasso began her career in alpine skiing before suffering an injury and transitioning to snowboarding. She represented Italy at the 2022 Winter Olympics in the parallel giant slalom event and finished in 29th place.

During the 2022–23 FIS Snowboard World Cup, she earned her first career World Cup podium on 26 January 2023, finishing in second place. During the 2023–24 FIS Snowboard World Cup, Dalmasso earned her first career World Cup victory on 13 January 2024. On 10 March 2024, during the final race of the season, she won the mixed team parallel race, along with Daniele Bagozza. She finished the season ranked third in the parallel giant slalom and fourth in the parallel slalom, and overall parallel standings.

During the opening race of the 2025–26 FIS Snowboard World Cup, she won the parallel giant slalom event on 6 December 2025, for her tenth career World Cup podium. On 13 January 2026, she won the parallel slalom event. The next day she won the first mixed team parallel race of the season, along with Aaron March.

Dalmasso represented Italy at the 2026 Winter Olympics and won a bronze medal in the parallel giant slalom.
