= Lily Dhawornvej =

American snowboarder (born 2009)

Personal information
- Born: August 14, 2009 (age 16) Littleton, Colorado, U.S.

Sport
- Country: United States
- Sport: Snowboarding
- Event(s): Slopestyle, Big air
- Club: Ski & Snowboard Club Vail
Medal record
Women's snowboarding
Representing the United States
Winter X Games
Bronze medal – third place	2025 Aspen	Knuckle Huck

Lily Dhawornvej (born August 14, 2009) is an American professional snowboarder, specializing in slopestyle and big air. She represented the United States in slopestyle and big air at the 2026 Winter Olympics.

== Career ==
Dhawornvej was introduced to snowboard through her uncle Tim, a snowboard instructor at Copper Mountain. She trained with the Team Summit academy program.

At the 2025 X Games, at 15 years old, Dhawornvej earned a bronze medal in the women's snowboard Knuckle Huck in her debut. Later that year, Dhawornvej was selected to the United States world championship roster, where she finished 15th in snowboard slopestyle. During the 2025–26 FIS Snowboard World Cup season, Dhawornvej finished second at the Laax Open in Switzerland, landing two 720s and a front flip.

At the 2026 Winter Olympics, Dhawornvej finished 20th in big air, the highest placing on the American team. In slopestyle, Dhawornvej made the final and finished 11th.

== Personal life ==
Dhawornvej is actively involved with Soy Sauce Nation, an organization promoting diversity and inclusion in snowboarding and representing the Asian American snowboarding community. Her father is a first-generation Thai American. Her older brother Caleb is also a competitive snowboarder.
