= Ian Matteoli =

Italian snowboarder (born 2005)

Personal information
- Nationality: Italian
- Born: 30 December 2005 (age 20) Bardonecchia, Italy

Sport
- Country: Italian
- Sport: Snowboarding
Medal record
Men's snowboarding
Representing Italy
Junior World Championships
Bronze medal – third place	2023 Cardrona	Big air

Ian Matteoli (born 30 December 2005) is an Italian snowboarder. He will be representing Italy in the 2026 Winter Olympics.

== Career ==
In December 2022 he achieved his and Italy's first ever Men's Big Air World Cup podium in the 2022–23 FIS Snowboard World Cup. Matteoli ruptured his spleen in February 2023.

Matteoli claimed the bronze medal in the 2023 FIS Snowboarding Junior World Championships – Men's big air held in Cardrona, New Zealand.

He claimed two big-air podiums in the 2024–25 FIS Snowboard World Cup and ended the season second in the big-air standings.

Matteoli represented Italy in the FIS Freestyle Ski and Snowboarding World Championships 2025 in the big air and the slopestyle coming seventh in the former and tenth in the latter.

He represents Italy at the 2026 Winter Olympics in big air and slopestyle, marking his Olympic debut.

== Personal life ==
He is the son of Andrea Matteoli, a former snowboarder.
