= Ally Hickman =

Australian snowboarder (born 2009)

Personal information
- Born: 2 November 2009 (age 16) Randwick, Australia
- Home town: Malabar, New South Wales, Australia

Sport
- Country: Australia
- Sport: Snowboarding
- Events: Big air, Slopestyle

World Cup career
- Seasons: 2 (2025 to 2026)
- Indiv. starts: 10 (BA – 4, SS – 6)
- Indiv. podiums: 1
- Indiv. wins: 0
Medal record
Women's snowboarding
Representing Australia
Junior World Championships
Bronze medal – third place	2023 Cardrona	Slopestyle
- Updated on 27 February 2026

Ally Hickman (born 2 November 2009) is an Australian snowboarder. She represented Australia at the 2026 Winter Olympics.

== Career ==
Hickman competed at the 2023 FIS Snowboarding Junior World Championships and won a bronze medal in the slopestyle event. At 13 years old, she was the youngest competitor at the event. With the win, she qualified to represent Australia at the 2024 Winter Youth Olympics. She finished in eighth place in the slopetyle event, and ninth place in the big air event. She was named the 2024 Snowboard Park & Pipe Junior Athlete of the Year.

During the 2025–26 FIS Snowboard World Cup she earned her first career World Cup podium on 13 December 2025, finishing in third place. At 16 years, one month old, she became the second youngest Australian World Cup medalist, after Indra Brown who won bronze the day before.

In January 2026, she was selected to represent Australia at the 2026 Winter Olympics. She competed in the big air event and failed to advance to the finals. She then competed in the slopestyle event and finished in seventh place with a score of 67.70. During her second run she fell on a top rail, injuring her sternum and was unable to complete the course. She was attended to by medical staff and returned for her third and final run.

== Results ==
=== Olympic Winter Games ===
As of 27 February 2026

Year	Age	Big air	Slopestyle
(Italy) 2026 Milano Cortina	16	15	7

=== World Cup results by season ===
As of 27 February 2026

Season	Big Air					Slopestyle					Overall Park & Pipe				
Season	Events started	Wins	Pods	Points	Rank	Events started	Wins	Pods	Points	Rank	Events started	Wins	Pods	Points	Rank
2024–25	1	0	0	9	42	4	0	0	36	28	5	0	0	45	57
2025–26	3	0	1	103	4	2	0	0	34	17	5	0	1	137	15

=== World Cup podiums ===
As of 27 February 2026

Event	Winner	Second	Third
Big air	0	0	1
Slopestyle	0	0	0
Total	0	0	1

No.	Season	Date	Location	Discipline	Place
1	2025–26	13 December 2025	Steamboat, Colorado, United States	Big Air	Third
