= Yu Seung-eun =

South Korean snowboarder (born 2008)

Personal information
- Born: 28 January 2008 (age 18) Seoul, South Korea

Sport
- Country: South Korea
- Sport: Snowboarding
- Event(s): Big air, Slopestyle
Medal record
Women's snowboarding
Representing South Korea
Olympic Games
Bronze medal – third place	2026 Milano Cortina	Big air

Yu Seung-eun (Korean: 유승은; born 28 January 2008) is a South Korean snowboarder.

== Career ==
During the 2025–26 FIS Snowboard World Cup, Yu earned her first career World Cup podium on 13 December 2025, finishing in second place in big air. She became the first South Korean snowboarder to win a World Cup medal in the big air event.

In January 2026, she was selected to represent South Korea at the 2026 Winter Olympics. She won a bronze medal in the big air event with a score of 171.00. She became the first South Korean woman to win a medal in snowboarding.
