= Rocco Jamieson =

New Zealand snowboarder (born 2006)

Personal information
- Born: 4 May 2006 (age 20) Christchurch, New Zealand

Sport
- Country: New Zealand
- Sport: Snowboarding
- Event(s): Big air, Slopestyle
Medal record
Men's snowboarding
Representing New Zealand
Winter X Games
Bronze medal – third place	2025 Aspen	Big air
Silver medal – second place	2026 Aspen	Big air

Rocco Jamieson (born 4 May 2006) is a New Zealand snowboarder.

== Early life ==
Jamieson was born in Christchurch and raised in the Southern Alps. He started snowboarding at age two, following in the footsteps of his parents, who were both professional riders. He currently resides in Wānaka.

== Career ==
Jamieson won a bronze medal in the big air event at the 2025 Winter X Games in Aspen, Colorado; Following up with a silver medal in the same event at the 2026 Winter X Games.

On 28 January 2026, he was selected to represent New Zealand at the 2026 Winter Olympics. During the big air event he advanced to the finals, alongside countrymen Dane Menzies and Lyon Farrell.
