= Bea Kim =

American snowboarder (born 2007)

Personal information
- Born: January 25, 2007 (age 19) Palos Verdes, California, U.S.

Sport
- Country: United States
- Sport: Snowboarding
- Event: Half pipe
- Club: Mammoth Mountain Snowboard Team
Medal record
Women's snowboarding
Representing the United States
Junior World Championships
Silver medal – second place	2022 Leysin	Halfpipe

Beatrice Kim (born January 25, 2007) is an American professional snowboarder, specializing in half pipe. She represented the United States in women's halfpipe at the 2026 Winter Olympics.

== Career ==
Kim started snowboarding at an early age and joined the Mammoth Mountain Snowboard Team at age nine to focus on competitions. She was a junior national champion in 2019.

Kim broke out on the international stage during the 2023–24 FIS Snowboard World Cup, where she recorded her first podium finish with 2nd place in Laax, Switzerland. Together with four fourth-place results, she finished 3rd overall in the halfpipe season standings. She missed most of the 2024-25 season with a shoulder injury that required surgery.

At the 2024 X Games, Kim finished fourth in snowboard superpipe.

At the 2026 Winter Olympics, she placed eighth in the final.

Kim is known for her climate activism with Protect Our Winters. She has spoken at the White House and in front of the United Nations about the impacts of climate change.

She is scheduled to start at Columbia University in fall 2026.
