= Txema Mazet-Brown =

British-New Zealander snowboarder (born 2006)

Personal information
- Nationality: British
- Born: 14 March 2006 (age 20) Saint-Pierre, Réunion

Sport
- Country: British
- Sport: Snowboarding
Medal record
Men's snowboarding
Representing New Zealand
Junior World Championships
| Gold medal – first place | 2024 Livigno/Mottolino | Big air |

Txema Mazet-Brown (born 14 March 2006) is a snowboarder. As a youth he represented New Zealand internationally, before switching to represent Great Britain for the 2026 Winter Olympics.

== Career ==
He represented New Zealand at the 2024 Winter Youth Olympics in the Men's slopestyle and the Men's big air where he failed to qualify for the final in the former but qualified for the final in the later and ultimately finished in ninth. At the end of the year, he achieved a gold medal in the 2024 FIS Snowboarding Junior World Championships – Men's big air in Livigno-Mottolino, Italy.

Mazet-Brown switched to his mother's nationality of Great Britain ahead of the 2024–25 season and first represented Great Britain in the FIS Freestyle Ski and Snowboarding World Championships 2025 where he competed in the Men's slopestyle and Men's big air, being unable to qualify for either final.

He will be representing Great Britain in the 2026 Winter Olympics in Men's big air and Men's slopestyle, marking his Olympic debut.

== Personal life ==
Born in Saint-Pierre, Réunion, to a French father and a British mother, he spent his winters in France under the guidance of father – an experienced skier, snowboarder and mountain guide. When he was three, he and family emigrated to New Zealand, where he continued to ski on the slopes of Mount Ruapehu, before starting out on a snowboard when he was nine.
