= Zuzana Maděrová =

Czech snowboarder (born 2003)

Personal information
- Born: 20 September 2003 (age 22) Liberec, Czech Republic

Sport
- Sport: Snowboarding
- Event(s): Parallel slalom, Parallel giant slalom
Medal record
Women's snowboarding
Representing Czech Republic
Olympic Games
Gold medal – first place	2026 Milano Cortina	Parallel giant slalom
Junior World Championships
Bronze medal – third place	2023 Bansko	Parallel slalom
Bronze medal – third place	2023 Bansko	Parallel team

Zuzana Maděrová (Czech pronunciation: [ˈzuzana ˈmaɟɛrovaː]; born 20 September 2003) is a Czech snowboarder specializing in parallel slalom and parallel giant slalom disciplines. She represented the Czech Republic at the 2022 and 2026 Winter Olympics.

== Career ==
During the 2023 FIS Snowboarding Junior World Championships she won a bronze medal in the parallel slalom and mixed parallel team events.

During the 2023–24 FIS Snowboard World Cup, she earned her first career World Cup podium on 27 January 2024, finishing in second place. During the final race of the 2024–25 FIS Snowboard World Cup on 15 March 2025, she earned her first World Cup podium of the season, finishing in third place.

In January 2026, she was selected to represent the Czech Republic at the 2026 Winter Olympics. During the parallel giant slalom qualification run she finished in second with a time of 1:31.48 and advanced to the finals. On 8 February 2026, she beat Sabine Payer in the big final and won a gold medal.
