= Leon Ulbricht =

German snowboarder (born 2004)

Personal information
- Born: 1 November 2004 (age 21) Bern, Switzerland

Sport
- Country: Germany
- Sport: Snowboarding
- Event: Snowboard cross
Medal record
Men's snowboarding
Representing Germany
Junior World Championships
Gold medal – first place	2022 Veysonnaz	Snowboard cross
Gold medal – first place	2024 Gudauri	Snowboard cross

Leon Ulbricht (born 1 November 2004) is a German snowboarder specializing in snowboard cross. He is a two-time Junior World Champion.

== Career ==
During the 2022 FIS Snowboarding Junior World Championships he won a gold medal in the snowboard cross. He repeated as junior snowboard cross champion in 2024.

During the 2023–24 FIS Snowboard World Cup, he earned his first career World Cup victory on 2 March 2024. On 24 March 2024, during the final race of the season, he earned his second career podium, finishing in third place.

In January 2026, he was selected to represent Germany at the 2026 Winter Olympics.
