= Mitch Brown (snowboarder) =

New Zealand snowboarder (born 1987)

Mitchell Brown (born 18 August 1987) is a snowboarder and from New Zealand. He competed for New Zealand in the men's half-pipe events at the 2006 Winter Olympics at Turin, Italy and the 2010 Winter Olympics in Vancouver, British Columbia, Canada.
