= Dane Menzies =

New Zealand snowboarder (born 2005)

Personal information
- Born: 27 March 2005 (age 21) Calgary, Alberta, Canada

Sport
- Country: New Zealand
- Sport: Snowboarding
- Event(s): Big air, Slopestyle

Dane Menzies (born 27 March 2005) is a New Zealand snowboarder.

== Early life ==
Menzies was born in Calgary to a Canadian mother and a New Zealand father. He grew up in Canmore, but later moved to Wanaka in the South Island of New Zealand. He trains with Mitch Brown.

== Career ==
During the 2025–26 FIS Snowboard World Cup, he earned his first career World Cup podium on 10 January 2026, finishing in third place.

In January 2026, he was selected to represent New Zealand at the 2026 Winter Olympics. During the big air event he advanced to the finals. During the finals he finished in sixth place with a score of 160.75. He then competed in the slopestyle event. During qualification he had the top score of 86.06, and advanced to the finals.
