= Romain Allemand =

French snowboarder (born 2006)

Personal information
- Born: 8 December 2006 (age 19) Marseille, France

Sport
- Sport: Snowboarding
Medal record
Men's snowboarding
Representing France
Winter Youth Olympics
Bronze medal – third place	2024 Gangwon	Slopestyle

Romain Allemand (born 8 December 2006) is a French snowboarder.

== Career ==
In January 2024, Allemand represented France at the 2024 Winter Youth Olympics and won a bronze medal in the slopestyle event with a score of 89.25. He then competed at the 2024 FIS Snowboarding Junior World Championships and won a silver medal in the slopestyle event. During the 2023–24 FIS Snowboard World Cup, he earned his first career World Cup podium on 15 March 2024, finishing in second in slopestyle.

In March 2025, he competed at the 2025 FIS Snowboarding World Championships and finished in fourth place in the slopestyle event with a score of 76.10, less than three points behind bronze medalist Oliver Martin's score of 78.98. He also finished in fourth place in the big air event with a score of 170.25. He was in podium position after the first two runs.

During the 2025–26 FIS Snowboard World Cup, he earned his first career World Cup win on 18 January 2026 in slopestyle. This was France's first ever slopestyle victory and the first men's World Cup Park & Pipe win since Arthur Longo won halfpipe gold in 2010. He was selected to compete at the 2026 Winter X Games, the only Frenchman invited to the X Games.
