= Tiarn Collins =

New Zealand snowboarder (born 1999)

Personal information
- Born: 9 November 1999 (age 27) Brisbane, Queensland, Australia
- Height: 1.80 m (5 ft 11 in)

Sport
- Country: New Zealand
- Sport: Snowboarding
- Events: Slopestyle; Big air
- Coached by: Sean Thompson; Mitch Brown
Medal record
Men's snowboarding
Representing New Zealand
Junior World Championships
Bronze medal – third place	2017 Špindlerův Mlýn	Slopestyle

Tiarn Collins (born 9 November 1999) is a New Zealand snowboarder, specialising in slopestyle and big air competitions. He is representing New Zealand in the slopestyle and big air events at the 2022 Winter Olympics in Beijing.

== Biography ==
Born in Brisbane, Australia, Collins moved to New Zealand with his family when he was eight years old, settling in Queenstown. He is of Māori descent, affiliating to Ngāi Tahu. Collins was home schooled after attending Wakatipu High School up to the end of year 10.

Collins competed in the 2016 Youth Olympic Games, where he finished fourth in slopestyle and fifth in the halfpipe. The following year, at the Junior World Championships, he won bronze in slopestyle. He was selected in the New Zealand team for the 2018 Winter Olympics, but dislocated his shoulder in the lead-up to competition and was unable to compete.

In the 2019–2020 season, Collins had his first World Cup slopestyle victory, winning at Calgary on 16 February 2020. He best result in the 2020-2021 World Cup was 15th in slopestyle. The following season, in the lead-up to the 2022 Winter Olympics, he finished third in slopestyle at the World Cup event at Mammoth Mountain and gained selection for the 2022 Winter Olympics.

At the 2022 Winter Olympics, Collins finished 18th in the men's slopestyle.
