= Valentino Guseli =

Australian snowboarder (born 2005)

- Guseli in 2026

Personal information
- Born: 1 April 2005 (age 21) Canberra, Australia

Sport
- Country: Australia
- Sport: Snowboarding
Medal record
Men's snowboarding
Representing Australia
World Championships
Silver medal – second place	2023 Bakuriani	Halfpipe
Winter X Games
Bronze medal – third place	2023 Aspen	SuperPipe

Valentino Guseli (born 1 April 2005) is an Australian snowboarder. He competed in the halfpipe event at the 2022 Winter Olympics and the big air at the 2026 Winter Olympics.

== Career ==
Guseli competed as a 16 year old at the Beijing Winter Olympics, and made the final of the halfpipe, finishing sixth overall.

At the 2026 Winter Olympics, Guseli was added to the big air competition mere hours before the qualification round when competitor Mark McMorris withdrew due to injury. Guseli finished twelfth in the qualifier, moving forward to the final round. He fell twice in the final, finishing in tenth. Guseli also competed in the half pipe event where he finished fifth.

== Personal life ==
Born in Australia, Guseli is of Italian descent through his father.
