= Oliver Martin (snowboarder) =

American snowboarder (born 2008)

Personal information
- Nickname: Ollie
- Born: June 15, 2008 (age 18) Wellington, New Zealand
- Home town: Wolcott, Colorado, U.S.

Sport
- Country: United States
- Sport: Snowboarding
- Club: Ski & Snowboard Club Vail
- Turned pro: 2025
Medal record
Men's snowboarding
Representing the United States
World Championships
Bronze medal – third place	2025 Engadin	Slopestyle
Bronze medal – third place	2025 Engadin	Big air
Winter Youth Olympics
Silver medal – second place	2024 Gangwon	Big air

Oliver Martin (born June 15, 2008) is an American snowboarder. He competed in the 2026 Olympics big air event, coming in 4th.

== Career ==
Martin represented the United States at the 2024 Winter Youth Olympics and won a silver medal in the big air event with 179.50 points. He also competed in the slopestyle event finished in fifth place with 82.25 points. In the fall of 2024, Martin became the youngest snowboarder to land a 2160.

On February 22, 2025, Martin won his first gold medal of the 2024–25 FIS Snowboard World Cup season. With this win, he became the youngest male snowboarder to win a World Cup Slopestyle event.

Martin made his FIS Snowboard World Championships debut for the United States at the 2025 Snowboarding World Championships and won a bronze medal in the slopestyle event with a score of 78.98 points. One week later, he also won a bronze medal in the big air event with a score of 171.75. At 16 years old, he was the second-youngest U.S. snowboarder to win a world championships medal after Arielle Gold, who won gold in 2013 at a younger 16.

In January 2026, he was selected to represent the United States at the 2026 Winter Olympics at age 17. During big air qualification he scored 167.50 and advanced to the finals. During the finals he finished in fourth place with a score of 163.00. He performed at the event with a broken arm.
