= Jake Canter =

American snowboarder (born 2003)

Personal information
- Born: July 19, 2003 (age 22) Evergreen, Colorado, U.S.
- Home town: Silverthorne, Colorado, U.S.

Sport
- Country: United States
- Sport: Snowboarding
- Event: Slopestyle
Medal record
Men's snowboarding
Representing the United States
Olympic Games
Bronze medal – third place	2026 Milano Cortina	Slopestyle

Jake Canter (born July 19, 2003) is an American snowboarder. He represented the United States at the 2026 Winter Olympics and won a bronze medal in slopestyle.

== Personal life ==
In 2016, when Canter was practicing on a trampoline an accident occurred when another athlete on a neighboring trampoline lost his balance mid-air and the two collided. This resulted in a fractured skull, a traumatic head injury and a brain bleed for Canter. Then, in the spring of 2017, the trampolining injury resulted in a more serious health condition, as spinal fluid was leaking due to the injury. The leakage led to bacterial meningitis, and Canter was placed in a medically-induced coma for six days. He had his ear drum removed due to an infection stemming from the meningitis, which left him deaf in his right ear.

== Career ==
During the 2021–22 FIS Snowboard World Cup, Canter earned his first career World Cup podium on January 15, 2022, finishing in third place.

During the 2025–26 FIS Snowboard World Cup, Canter earned his first World Cup win, with a score of 85.16. With his win he qualified to represent the United States at the 2026 Winter Olympics. He won a bronze medal in the slopestyle event with a score of 79.36.
