= Su Yiming =

Chinese snowboarder (born 2004)

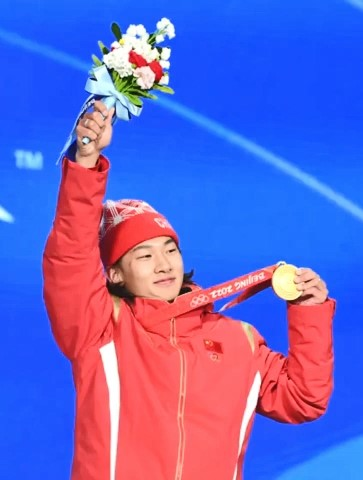

Personal information
- Born: 18 February 2004 (age 22) Jilin City, Jilin, China

Sport
- Country: China
- Sport: Snowboarding
- Events: Slopestyle, Big air
Medal record
Men's snowboarding
Representing China
Olympic Games
Gold medal – first place	2022 Beijing	Big air
Gold medal – first place	2026 Milano Cortina	Slopestyle
Silver medal – second place	2022 Beijing	Slopestyle
Bronze medal – third place	2026 Milano Cortina	Big air
World Championships
Silver medal – second place	2025 Engadin	Slopestyle
Winter X Games
Bronze medal – third place	2023 Aspen	Big air

Su Yiming (Chinese: 苏翊鸣; pinyin: Sū Yìmíng; born 18 February 2004) is a Chinese snowboarder, an Olympic champion and former child actor. By winning the 2021–22 FIS Snowboard World Cup Big Air event at Steamboat Ski Resort on 4 December 2021, he became the first Chinese snowboarder to take a World Cup podium position.

Su is recognized as the first snowboarder to complete and land the 1980-degree aerial spin successfully. He also likes surfing.

== Personal life ==
Su was born on 18 February 2004, in Jilin City, Jilin, China. Following his 2022 Olympic win, he enrolled at Tsinghua University.

Since 2023, he has been in a relationship with Chinese-American figure skater, Zhu Yi, who he met during the 2022 Winter Olympics.

== 2022 Winter Olympics ==
He competed at the 2022 Winter Olympics and was the only competitor to achieve an 1800-degree aerial in the men's slopestyle event, winning a silver medal, making him the second Chinese athlete after Liu Jiayu to win an Olympic medal in snowboarding. The silver was controversial however, as confounded fans said Su was "robbed" by the low judging scores in spite of his unprecedented performances, and also due to the judges missing a glaring error made by gold medalist Max Parrot of Canada after judges fail to see him grab his knee rather than his board during the men's slopestyle final. British expert Ed Leigh wrote in the BBC, "The judges have put execution at such a premium that something like that should have cost him two or three points. So the gold has gone wrong there. ... I think Su Yiming actually took the gold there. This is a mistake on the judges' part." Iztok Sumatic, chief judge at the Olympics, admitted that judges failed to pick up on the mistake by Parrot in his second run due to not being given the camera angles of viewers. He also likened it to Diego Maradona's "Hand of God" refereeing mistake. Sumatic also said that after the event he received a call from Su, who said that he respected the judging and was happy with the competition result regardless. However, Parrot acknowledged the error but still felt like he had the most technical run and deserved his gold medal.

A week following the slopestyle event, Su won the gold medal in the Big Air event with a score of 182.50 by completing a front-side 1800 and a back-side triple-cork 1800 in his first and second runs respectively, and edging out Mons Røisland who won silver while Max Parrot grabbed the bronze medal. In doing so, 17-year-old Su became the first Chinese athlete to win a gold medal in the event, four days before his 18th birthday.

== Filmography ==
=== Film ===
- The Taking of Tiger Mountain (2014) as Jiang Shuanzi
- Rock Kid (摇滚小子, 2018) as Baobei

=== TV series ===
- Tracks in the Snowy Forest (林海雪原, 2017) as Shui An
- A Splendid Life in Beijing (生逢灿烂的日子, 2017) as Young Guo Xiaohai
- The Wolf (2020) as Young Zhao Liuye

Olympic Games
Preceded by Gao Tingyu & Xu Mengtao	Flagbearer for China at the Olympics closing ceremony Milano Cortina 2026	Succeeded by Incumbent
