= Lyon Farrell =

American-New Zealander snowboarder (born 1998)

Personal information
- Born: 22 November 1998 (age 27) Los Angeles, California, U.S.

Sport
- Country: New Zealand
- Sport: Snowboarding
Medal record
Men's snowboarding
Representing New Zealand
Junior World Championships
Silver medal – second place	2014 Valmalenco	Halfpipe

Lyon Farrell (born 22 November 1998) is a New Zealand snowboarder. He is representing New Zealand in the 2026 Winter Olympics.

== Career ==
Farrell was born to a New Zealand father in Los Angeles and raised in Maui, Hawaii, from three months of age. He initially learned to ski at Cardrona Alpine Resort, but switched to snowboarding at 11 years. He represented New Zealand in the 2014 Snowboarding Junior World Championships held in Valmalenco, Italy, and got a silver medal in the men's halfpipe.

He achieved his first World Cup podium representing the United States in the 2017–18 FIS Snowboard World Cup in the men's slopestyle and collected another third in the same category 2018–19 FIS Snowboard World Cup. He came twelfth in the finals of the FIS Freestyle Ski and Snowboarding World Championships 2021 – Men's snowboard slopestyle. Farrell also came ninth in the FIS Freestyle Ski and Snowboarding World Championships 2023 – Men's snowboard slopestyle finals.

He is representing New Zealand at the 2026 Winter Olympics in Men's big air and Men's slopestyle, marking his Olympic debut. He advanced to the finals of the big air event.
