= Liam Brearley =

Canadian snowboarder (born 2003)

- Brearley in 2026

Personal information
- Nationality: Canadian
- Born: February 27, 2003 (age 23) Gravenhurst, Ontario, Canada

Sport
- Country: Canada
- Sport: Snowboarding
Medal record
Men's snowboarding
Representing Canada
World Championships
Gold medal – first place	2025 Engadin	Slopestyle
Winter Youth Olympics
Silver medal – second place	2020 Lausanne	Slopestyle
Bronze medal – third place	2020 Lausanne	Big air
Bronze medal – third place	2020 Lausanne	Halfpipe

Liam Brearley (born February 27, 2003) is a Canadian snowboarder.

== Career ==
Brearley represented Canada at the 2025 Snowboarding World Championships and won a gold medal in the slopestyle event with a score of 90.15 points. He became the first Canadian man to ever become a world champion in the snowboard slopestyle event.
