= Marcus Kleveland =

Norwegian snowboarder (born 1999)

- Kleveland in 2026

Personal information
- Nationality: Norwegian
- Born: 25 April 1999 (age 27) Lillehammer, Norway
- Height: 1.72 m (5 ft 8 in)

Sport
- Country: Norway
- Sport: Snowboarding
- Events: Slopestyle; Big Air; Knuckle huck
- Club: Dombaas Il
- Turned pro: 2013
Medal record
Men's snowboarding
Representing Norway
World Championships
Gold medal – first place	2021 Aspen	Slopestyle
Gold medal – first place	2023 Bakuriani	Slopestyle
Bronze medal – third place	2017 Sierra Nevada	Big air
Bronze medal – third place	2021 Aspen	Big air
Winter X Games
Gold medal – first place	2017 Aspen	Slopestyle
Gold medal – first place	2018 Aspen	Slopestyle
Gold medal – first place	2020 Norway	Knuckle Huck
Gold medal – first place	2021 Aspen	Big Air
Gold medal – first place	2022 Aspen	Big Air
Gold medal – first place	2022 Aspen	Knuckle Huck
Gold medal – first place	2023 Aspen	Big Air
Gold medal – first place	2023 Aspen	Knuckle Huck
Silver medal – second place	2017 Aspen	Big Air
Silver medal – second place	2018 Aspen	Big Air
Silver medal – second place	2018 Norway	Big Air
Silver medal – second place	2022 Aspen	Slopestyle
Silver medal – second place	2023 Aspen	Slopestyle
Silver medal – second place	2026 Aspen	Slopestyle
Bronze medal – third place	2026 Aspen	Knuckle Huck

Marcus Kleveland (born 25 April 1999) is a Norwegian professional snowboarder who specializes in the slopestyle and big air events. He was the first ever to complete a quad cork 1800 in competition and won gold in Slopestyle and silver in Big Air at his Winter X Games debut in 2017. He also won the world cup of Milan in November 2016. In 2018, he won 2 medals at Winter X Games : Gold at Slopestyle and a 2nd place at Big Air. Following the X Games, Kleveland attended his first Olympics at only 18, placing 6th in the Men's Slopestyle and 18th in Big Air. After the Winter Olympics, he won 3rd place at the 2018 Burton U-S Open Slopestyle. In the Big Air event at X Games 2021 he took home gold. Marcus achieved his best feat in competition obtaining three medals at the Winter X Games 2022. He took home gold in the Men's Snowboard Big Air and Men's Snowboard Knuckle Huck, as well as a silver in Men's Snowboard Slopestyle. Kleveland placed 8th in Men's Slopestyle at the 2022 Winter Olympics.
