= Kira Kimura =

Japanese snowboarder (born 2004)

Personal information
- Born: 30 June 2004 (age 22) Okayama, Japan

Sport
- Country: Japan
- Sport: Snowboarding
- Events: Big air, Slopestyle
Medal record
Men's snowboarding
Representing Japan
Olympic Games
Gold medal – first place	2026 Milano Cortina	Big air
Winter X Games
Bronze medal – third place	2025 Aspen	Big air

Kira Kimura (木村 葵来, Kimura Kira; born 30 June 2004) is a Japanese snowboarder.

== Career ==
Kimura made his World Cup debut during the 2022–23 FIS Snowboard World Cup and earned his first career podium on 14 January 2023, finishing in third place. During the 2023–24 FIS Snowboard World Cup, he was the Crystal Globe winner in big air. He suffered an ankle injury during the 2024–25 FIS Snowboard World Cup, and earned only one podium finish. During the 2025–26 FIS Snowboard World Cup he had two second place podiums, and finished in second in the overall big air standings.

He competed at the 2026 Winter X Games and won a bronze medal in the big air event. In January 2026, he was selected to represent Japan at the 2026 Winter Olympics. During big air qualification he ranked third with 173.25 points and advanced to the finals. He won a gold medal during the finals with a score of 179.50.
