= Sean FitzSimons =

American snowboarder (born 2000)

Personal information
- Born: September 22, 2000 (age 25) Hood River, Oregon, U.S.

Sport
- Country: United States
- Sport: Snowboarding
- Event(s): Slopestyle, Big air

Sean FitzSimons (born September 22, 2000) is an American snowboarder who competes in the slopestyle and big air events. He represented the United States at the 2022 and 2026 Winter Olympics.

== Career ==
On January 15, 2022, FitzSimons won the men's slopestyle competition at the Laax Open with a score of 80.91 points. As a result, this boosted his U.S. ranking to fourth and international ranking to eighth and he qualified to represent the United States at the 2022 Winter Olympics. In 2025 he was given a three-month ban for using a prohibited method.

== Personal life ==
Sean Michael FitzSimons was born to Michael Brewster FitzSimons and Jennifer FitzSimons (née Spane) on September 22, 2000 in Hood River, Oregon. In addition to snowboarding he is an avid skateboarder and mountain biker. He is the grandson of Illinois politician Edward J. FitzSimons.
