= Øyvind Kirkhus =

Norwegian snowboarder (born 2002)

Personal information
- Born: 14 May 2002 (age 24) Oslo, Norway

Øyvind Kirkhus (born 14 May 2002) is a Norwegian snowboarder.

Øyvind Kirkhus was born in Oslo, Norway. He began snowboarding at Tryvann Ski Resort.

Kirkhus was the first snowboarder to land a switch backside quad 1620.

Kirkhus was inspired by Torstein Horgmo.
