= Ryoma Kimata =

Japanese snowboarder (born 2002)

Personal information
- Born: 24 July 2002 (age 23) Aichi Prefecture, Japan
- Height: 1.68 m (5 ft 6 in)
- Weight: 60 kg (132 lb)

Sport
- Country: Japan
- Sport: Snowboarding
- Event(s): Big air, Slopestyle
Medal record
Men's snowboarding
Representing Japan
Olympic Games
Silver medal – second place	2026 Milano Cortina	Big air
World Championships
Gold medal – first place	2025 Engadin	Big air
Silver medal – second place	2023 Bakuriani	Slopestyle
Winter Youth Olympics
Gold medal – first place	2020 Lausanne	Big air

Ryoma Kimata (木俣 椋真, Kimata Ryōma; born 24 July 2002) is a Japanese snowboarder.

== Career ==
In April 2019, he competed at the FIS Snowboarding Junior World Championships and won a gold medal in the big air event. He then competed at the 2020 Winter Youth Olympics and won a gold medal in the big air event with a score of 195.00 points.

Kimata represented Japan at the 2025 Snowboarding World Championships in the big air event. During his second run, he fell attempting a backside 1980 melon, which resulted in a bloody nose. After receiving medical attention, he returned for his third and final run. He landed a backside 1980 and won the gold medal with a score of 176.75.

In January 2026, he was selected to represent Japan at the 2026 Winter Olympics. During big air qualification he scored 164.75 points and advanced to the finals. He won a silver medal during the finals with a score of 171.50.
