= Taiga Hasegawa =

Japanese snowboarder (born 2005)

Personal information
- Born: 23 October 2005 (age 20) Iwakura, Aichi Prefecture, Japan
- Weight: 55 kg (121 lb)

Sport
- Country: Japan
- Sport: Snowboarding
- Event(s): Big air, Slopestyle
Medal record
Men's snowboarding
Representing Japan
Olympic Games
Silver medal – second place	2026 Milano Cortina	Slopestyle
World Championships
Gold medal – first place	2023 Bakuriani	Big air
Silver medal – second place	2025 Engadin	Big air
Winter X Games
Gold medal – first place	2024 Aspen	Big air
Silver medal – second place	2025 Aspen	Big air
Bronze medal – third place	2025 Aspen	Slopestyle

Taiga Hasegawa (長谷川 帝勝, Hasegawa Taiga; born 23 October 2005) is a Japanese snowboarder. He represented Japan at the 2026 Winter Olympics and won a silver medal in slopestyle.

== Career ==
Hasegawa represented Japan at the 2023 Snowboarding World Championships and won a gold medal in the big air event with a score of 177.25 points.

In January 2024, he competed at the 2024 Winter X Games in the big air event. He became the first snowboarder to land a switch backside 1980 in competition, and won a gold medal. In January 2025, he again competed at the X Games and won a silver medal in the big air, and a bronze medal in the slopestyle events.

In March 2025, he again represented Japan at the 2025 Snowboarding World Championships and won a silver medal in the big air event with a score of 174.50 points.

He represented Japan at the 2026 Winter Olympics and won a silver medal in the slopestyle event with a score of 82.13.
