= Hiroto Ogiwara =

Japanese snowboarder (born 2005)

Personal information
- Born: 19 July 2005 (age 20) Ushiku, Japan
Medal record
Men's snowboarding
Winter X Games
Gold medal – first place	2025 Aspen	Big air
Gold medal – first place	2026 Aspen	Big air

Hiroto Ogiwara (Japanese: 荻原 大翔, Hepburn: Ogiwara Hiroto; born 19 July 2005) is a Japanese snowboarder. Ogiwara started snowboarding at the age of three and became a professional at twelve years old. In April 2022, Ogiwara landed the first 2160, a trick consisting of 6 full rotations. At his X Games debut in January 2025, he won a gold medal after successfully landing the first ever 2340 in competition, completing six and a half rotations before landing. Ogiwara has also won various FIS competitions and other events during his career.

== Early life ==
Ogiwara was born on 19 July 2005 in Ushiku, Japan. He started snowboarding with his father at the age of three at NEKOMA Mountain. His father’s enthusiasm and his professional background at the mountain encouraged Ogiwara to become fully immersed in the sport through their frequent sessions together. A video of him landing a backside 1080 went viral when he was nine years old. As of January 2025, Ogiwara is a student of Sendai University.

== Snowboarding career ==
Ogiwara began competing professionally in 2017 at the age of twelve. He won All Japan Junior Ski Championship titles in 2021 and 2022. Additionally, he was the slopestyle champion at the World Rookie Tour in both 2021 and 2022. At The Nines event in April 2022, Ogiwara became the first snowboarder to land a 2160, a trick consisting of 6 full rotations. It took him six attempts to successfully land the trick.

At the 2023–24 FIS Snowboard World Cup, Ogiwara won the big air event in Chur, Switzerland, on 21 October 2023. In the following season, he secured his second victory, taking first place at the big air event in Beijing on 1 December 2024. On 12 April 2024, he won the slopestyle event at the European Cup Premium in Corvatsch, Switzerland. He took first place at the New Zealand Freestyle Nationals in September 2024.

Ogiwara made his X Games debut on 24 January 2025, competing in the big air event at X Games Aspen 2025. At the event, Ogiwara landed the first ever 2340 in competition, completing six and a half rotations before landing. He completed the trick despite having fractured his forearm before the event during practice. For the trick, Ogiwara received a score of 97.33 and the gold medal for the event. He repeated the 2340 at X Games Aspen 2026, again winning a gold medal and remaining the only snowboarder to complete the trick in competition. He also competed in the 2026 Winter Olympics, finishing 12th in men's snowboard big air.
