= Francis Jobin (snowboarder) =

Canadian snowboarder (born 1998)

Personal information
- Born: September 21, 1998 (age 27) Québec City, Canada
- Home town: Lac Beauport, Quebec, Canada

Sport
- Country: Canada
- Sport: Snowboarding
- Event(s): Big air, Slopestyle
Medal record
Men's snowboarding
Representing Canada
Junior World Championships
Bronze medal – third place	2016 Seiser Alm	Big air
Winter X Games
Gold medal – first place	2025 Aspen	Street style

Francis Jobin (born September 21, 1998) is a Canadian snowboarder.

== Career ==
Jobin competed at the 2025 Winter X Games and won a gold medal in the snowboard street style event. During the 2024–25 FIS Snowboard World Cup, he earned his first career World Cup victory on February 2, 2025.

In January 2026, he was selected to represent Canada at the 2026 Winter Olympics. During the big air qualification he ranked sixth and advanced to the finals. During the finals he finished in seventh place with a score of 149.50.
