= Cameron Spalding =

Canadian snowboarder (born 2005)

Personal information
- Born: March 20, 2005 (age 21) Peterborough, Canada
- Home town: Havelock-Belmont-Methuen, Canada

Sport
- Country: Canada
- Sport: Snowboarding
- Events: Big air, Slopestyle
Medal record
Men's snowboarding
Representing Canada
Junior World Championships
Gold medal – first place	2022 Leysin	Slopestyle
Silver medal – second place	2023 Cardrona	Slopestyle

Cameron Spalding (born March 20, 2005) is a Canadian snowboarder.

== Career ==
Spalding competed at the 2022 FIS Snowboarding Junior World Championships and won a gold medal in the slopestyle event.

During the 2024–25 FIS Snowboard World Cup, he earned his first career World Cup victory on September 2, 2024. On January 18, 2025, he won his second consecutive slopestyle event. He finished the season as the slopestyle Crystal Globe winner.

In January 2026, he was selected to represent Canada at the 2026 Winter Olympics.
