= FIS Freestyle Ski and Snowboarding World Championships 2015 – Men's snowboard halfpipe =

The men's snowboard halfpipe competition of the FIS Freestyle Ski and Snowboarding World Championships 2015 was held at Kreischberg, Austria on January 16 (qualifying) and January 17 (finals). 41 athletes from 15 countries competed.

== Qualification ==
The following are the results of the qualification.

Rank	Heat	Bib	Name	Country	Run 1	Run 2	Best	Notes
1	1	13	Scotty James	Australia	86.50	92.25	92.25	Q
2	1	15	David Habluetzel	Switzerland	88.00	63.50	88.00	Q
3	1	17	Christian Haller	Switzerland	74.50	86.75	86.75	Q
4	1	11	Zhang Yiwei	China	78.25	82.75	82.75	Q
5	1	25	Lee Kwang-ki	South Korea	28.50	78.50	78.50	Q
6	1	47	Dimi de Jong	Netherlands	77.50	27.50	77.50	
7	1	19	Chase Josey	United States	51.00	74.25	74.25	
8	1	13	Raibu Katayama	Japan	70.00	42.00	70.00	
9	1	29	Benjamin Farrow	United States	11.25	69.75	69.75	
10	1	43	Kim Ho-jun	South Korea	65.75	17.50	65.75	
11	1	21	Dolf van der Wal	Netherlands	65.00	12.00	65.00	
12	1	23	Johann Baisamy	France	60.75	13.25	60.75	
13	1	39	Kweon Lee-jun	South Korea	53.25	58.75	58.75	
14	1	51	Filip Kavcic	Slovenia	49.25	17.50	49.25	
15	1	41	Filip Tarasov	Russia	43.75	46.50	46.50	
15	1	27	Ayumu Nedefuji	Japan	46.50	45.00	46.50	
17	1	31	Arthur Longo	France	39.50	45.25	45.25	
18	1	49	Hu Yi	China	42.50	23.75	42.50	
19	1	45	Alexandr Sladkov	Russia	39.25	18.50	39.25	
20	1	35	Ryan Wachendorfer	United States	36.75	28.00	36.75	
21	1	37	Nikita Avtaneev	Russia	34.50	27.25	34.50	
1	2	16	Kent Callister	Australia	77.00	91.00	91.00	Q
2	2	24	Jan Scherrer	Switzerland	88.50	72.00	88.50	Q
3	2	12	Taku Hiraoka	Japan	84.75	57.75	84.75	Q
4	2	18	Tim-Kevin Ravnjak	Slovenia	84.50	77.00	84.50	Q
5	2	14	Iouri Podladtchikov	Switzerland	81.50	77.25	81.50	Q
6	2	38	Markus Malin	Finland	77.25	81.00	81.00	
7	2	22	Nathan Johnstone	Australia	69.00	78.75	78.75	
8	2	20	Seamus O'Connor	Ireland	67.00	78.25	78.25	
9	2	26	Janne Korpi	Finland	69.00	70.00	70.00	
10	2	50	Sebbe de Buck	Belgium	14.50	63.00	63.00	
11	2	40	Tit Stante	Slovenia	54.75	28.50	54.75	
12	2	28	Derek Livingston	Canada	16.50	54.50	54.50	
13	2	32	Ikumi Imai	Japan	53.50	36.00	58.75	
14	2	36	Johannes Hoepfl	Germany	35.25	51.75	51.75	
15	2	44	Jan Kralj	Slovenia	44.50	46.25	46.25	
16	2	34	Brad Martin	Canada	42.00	44.75	44.75	
17	2	48	Huang Shiying	China	40.00	32.00	40.00	
18	2	46	Pavel Smirnov	Russia	12.75	31.75	31.75	
19	2	42	Lyon Farrell	United States	24.50	18.00	24.50	
20	2	30	Shi Wancheng	China	12.25	22.00	22.00	

== Final ==
The following are the results of the finals.

Rank	Bib	Name	Country	Run 1	Run 2	Run 3	Best
1st place, gold medalist(s)	1	Scotty James	Australia	91.50	20.25	1.00	91.50
2nd place, silver medalist(s)	8	Zhang Yiwei	China	89.00	89.50	16.00	89.50
3rd place, bronze medalist(s)	7	Tim-Kevin Ravnjak	Slovenia	82.00	79.50	89.25	89.25
4	9	Iouri Podladtchikov	Switzerland	71.75	30.25	84.25	84.25
5	6	Taku Hiraoka	Japan	43.25	82.50	28.25	82.50
6	2	Kent Callister	Australia	67.00	82.25	20.75	82.25
7	5	Christian Haller	Switzerland	75.00	30.50	74.25	75.00
8	10	Lee Kwang-ki	South Korea	41.25	65.75	60.75	65.75
9	4	David Habluetzel	Switzerland	64.25	45.25	40.75	64.25
10	3	Jan Scherrer	Switzerland	15.50	12.50	44.75	44.75
