= FIS Freestyle Ski and Snowboarding World Championships 2019 – Men's snowboard halfpipe =

Men's snowboard halfpipe at the FIS Freestyle Ski and Snowboarding World Championships 2019
- Venue: Park City Mountain Resort
- Location: Utah, United States
- Dates: February 6–8
- Competitors: 30 from 12 nations
- Winning points: 97.50

Medalists
gold medal	Scotty James	Australia
silver medal	Yūto Totsuka	Japan
bronze medal	Patrick Burgener	Switzerland

The Men's ski halfpipe competition at the FIS Freestyle Ski and Snowboarding World Championships 2019 was held on February 7 and 9, 2019.

== Qualification ==
The qualification was started on February 6, at 14:00. The ten best snowboarders qualified for the final.

Rank	Bib	Start order	Name	Country	Run 1	Run 2	Best	Notes
1	2	9	Yūto Totsuka	Japan	86.50	38.25	86.50	Q
2	5	1	Patrick Burgener	Switzerland	83.75	33.50	83.75	Q
3	1	5	Scotty James	Australia	22.00	80.75	80.75	Q
4	11	11	Kent Callister	Australia	76.25	62.25	76.25	Q
5	15	27	Iouri Podladtchikov	Switzerland	75.75	49.25	75.75	Q
6	8	7	Ikko Anai	Japan	75.25	36.25	75.25	Q
7	7	6	Jan Scherrer	Switzerland	73.75	74.00	74.00	Q
8	6	10	Toby Miller	United States	66.50	72.25	72.25	Q
9	25	18	Zhang Yiwei	China	69.50	71.25	71.25	Q
10	14	30	Derek Livingston	Canada	69.00	59.75	69.00	Q
11	13	16	Lee Kwang-ki	South Korea	62.50	38.00	62.50	
12	4	4	Raibu Katayama	Japan	17.25	61.75	61.75	
13	9	2	Ruka Hirano	Japan	59.75	17.00	59.75	
14	3	8	Chase Josey	United States	58.00	38.00	58.00	
15	18	25	Christoph Lechner	Germany	54.50	38.50	54.50	
16	24	17	Tit Štante	Slovenia	51.75	53.50	53.50	
17	28	20	Fan Xiaobing	China	52.25	35.75	52.25	
18	16	24	Liam Tourki	France	11.50	52.00	52.00	
19	22	23	Andre Höflich	Germany	49.25	50.00	50.00	
20	31	29	Seamus O'Connor	Ireland	44.50	49.50	49.50	
21	19	12	Nikita Avtaneev	Russia	28.25	49.00	49.00	
22	26	21	Wang Ziyang	China	47.00	18.25	47.00	
23	27	13	Braeden Adams	Canada	43.75	23.00	43.75	
24	20	14	Kweon Lee-jun	South Korea	13.50	40.75	40.75	
25	12	19	Chase Blackwell	United States	28.75	14.25	28.75	
26	23	15	Jack Collins	Canada	25.50	16.75	25.50	
27	17	28	Shawn Fair	Canada	24.25	18.00	24.25	
28	10	3	Jake Pates	United States	21.00	17.50	21.00	
29	29	22	Lee Hyun-jun	South Korea	20.75	6.75	20.75	
30	30	26	Gu Ao	China	14.00	8.50	14.00	

== Final ==
The final was started at 19:16.

Rank	Bib	Start order	Name	Country	Run 1	Run 2	Run 3	Best	Notes
1st place, gold medalist(s)	1	8	Scotty James	Australia	94.25	24.00	97.50	97.50	
2nd place, silver medalist(s)	2	10	Yūto Totsuka	Japan	85.50	92.25	45.25	92.25	
3rd place, bronze medalist(s)	5	9	Patrick Burgener	Switzerland	84.75	91.25	41.25	91.25	
4	6	3	Toby Miller	United States	42.75	90.00	48.00	90.00	
5	11	7	Kent Callister	Australia	79.00	29.25	13.25	79.00	
6	8	5	Ikko Anai	Japan	52.25	49.00	75.75	75.75	
7	14	1	Derek Livingston	Canada	73.75	12.75	44.75	73.75	
8	25	2	Zhang Yiwei	China	61.25	13.00	13.75	61.25	
9	7	4	Jan Scherrer	Switzerland	8.25	38.75	8.50	38.75	
—	15	6	Iouri Podladtchikov	Switzerland	Did not started				
