= Snowboarding at the 2026 Winter Olympics – Men's halfpipe =

Men's halfpipe at the XXV Olympic Winter Games
- Snowboarding
- Venue: Livigno Snow Park, Valtellina
- Date: 11, 13 February

Medalists
1st place, gold medalist(s)		Yūto Totsuka	Japan
2nd place, silver medalist(s)		Scotty James	Australia
3rd place, bronze medalist(s)		Ryusei Yamada	Japan

The men's halfpipe competition in snowboarding at the 2026 Winter Olympics will be held on 11 February (qualification) and 13 February (final), at the Livigno Snow Park in Valtellina. Yūto Totsuka of Japan won the event, Scotty James of Australia won the silver medal, replicating his 2022 performance, and Ryusei Yamada of Japan won bronze. Totsuka and Yamada won their first Olympic medals.

== Background ==
All three 2022 medalists, Ayumu Hirano, the champion, Scotty James, the silver medalist, and Jan Scherrer, the bronze medalist, qualified for the event. Yūto Totsuka was leading the 2025–26 FIS Snowboard World Cup standings in men's halfpipe. The 2025 World champion was James.

== Summary ==
Only four competitors got more than 90 points for their runs - James, Totsuka, Yamada, and Hirano. After the first run in the final, Yamada, Totsuka, and Hirano were standing in medal positions. James, who was running last, fell. In the second run, Hirano and Yamada did not improve, Totsuka showed the best run of the day, scoring 95 and passing Yamada, and James got 93.50 and finished provisionally second. In the last run, out of four main competitors, only Hirano improved from 90 to 91 points, but it was not sufficient for a medal.

== Results ==
=== Qualification ===
Q — Qualified for the Final
DNI — Does Not Improve
DNS — Did Not Start

The top 12 athletes in the qualifiers advance to the Final.

Rank	Bib	Order	Name	Country	Run 1	Run 2	Best	Notes
1	2	8	Scotty James	Australia	94.00	DNI	94.00	Q
2	1	2	Yūto Totsuka	Japan	85.50	91.25	91.25	Q
3	7	9	Ryusei Yamada	Japan	90.25	DNI	90.25	Q
4	8	3	Alessandro Barbieri	United States	88.50	DNI	88.50	Q
5	3	1	Ruka Hirano	Japan	80.50	87.50	87.50	Q
6	5	5	Valentino Guseli	Australia	86.75	DNI	86.75	Q
7	4	4	Ayumu Hirano	Japan	83.00	85.50	85.50	Q
8	6	7	Campbell Melville Ives	New Zealand	84.75	DNI	84.75	Q
9	16	19	Lee Chae-un	South Korea	82.00	DNI	82.00	Q
10	15	18	Wang Ziyang	China	77.75	80.50	80.50	Q
11	12	11	Chase Josey	United States	76.50	DNI	76.50	Q
12	19	16	Jake Pates	United States	24.25	75.50	75.50	Q
13	14	12	Lee Ji-o	South Korea	17.75	74.00	74.00	
14	2	6	Patrick Burgener	Brazil	70.00	DNI	70.00	
15	11	14	Chase Blackwell	United States	69.00	DNI	69.00	
16	17	15	Jonas Hasler	Switzerland	66.75	67.75	67.75	
17	18	20	David Hablützel	Switzerland	64.25	DNI	64.25	
18	23	25	Louie Vito	Italy	58.75	DNI	58.75	
19	21	22	Augustinho Teixeira	Brazil	56.50	DNI	56.50	
20	24	21	Ren Chongshuo	China	39.25	DNI	39.25	
21	25	24	Florian Lechner	Austria	12.25	13.50	13.50	
22	20	13	Mischa Zuercher	Switzerland	13.25	DNI	13.25	
23	10	10	Kim Geon-hui	South Korea	8.00	8.50	8.50	
24	13	17	Christoph Lechner	Germany	5.00	DNI	5.00	
25	22	23	Jan Scherrer	Switzerland	DNS	DNS	DNS	

=== Final ===
Rank	Bib	Order	Name	Country	Run 1	Run 2	Run 3	Best	Notes
1st place, gold medalist(s)	1	11	Yūto Totsuka	Japan	91.00	95.00	DNI	95.00	
2nd place, silver medalist(s)	2	12	Scotty James	Australia	48.75	93.50	DNI	93.50	
3rd place, bronze medalist(s)	7	10	Ryusei Yamada	Japan	92.00	DNI	92.00	92.00	
4	3	8	Ruka Hirano	Japan	90.00	90.00	91.00	91.00	
5	5	7	Valentino Guseli	Australia	35.00	DNI	88.00	88.00	
6	16	4	Lee Chae-un	South Korea	24.75	24.75	87.50	87.50	
7	4	6	Ayumu Hirano	Japan	27.50	86.50	DNI	86.50	
8	19	1	Jake Pates	United States	77.50	DNI	DNI	77.50	
9	15	3	Wang Ziyang	China	17.75	17.25	76.00	76.00	
10	8	9	Alessandro Barbieri	United States	75.00	DNI	DNI	75.00	
11	12	2	Chase Josey	United States	11.75	70.25	DNI	70.25	
12	6	5	Campbell Melville Ives	New Zealand	43.00	DNI	DNI	43.00	
