= FIS Freestyle Ski and Snowboarding World Championships 2025 – Men's snowboard halfpipe =

Men's snowboard halfpipe at the FIS Freestyle Ski and Snowboarding World Championships 2025
- Location: Corvatsch, Switzerland
- Date: 27 March (qualification); 29 March (final)
- Competitors: 33 from 16 nations
- Winning points: 95.00

Medalists
gold medal	Scotty James	Australia
silver medal	Ruka Hirano	Japan
bronze medal	Yūto Totsuka	Japan

The Men's snowboard halfpipe competition at the FIS Freestyle Ski and Snowboarding World Championships 2025 was held on 27 and 29 March 2025.

== Qualification ==
The qualification was started on 27 March at 13:00. The sixteen best snowboarders qualified for the final.

Rank	Bib	Start order	Name	Country	Run 1	Run 2	Best	Notes
1	1	7	Yūto Totsuka	Japan	93.00	97.00	97.00	Q
2	2	5	Ruka Hirano	Japan	87.75	94.25	94.25	Q
3	4	4	Scotty James	Australia	94.25	DNI	92.25	Q
4	8	3	Chase Josey	United States	90.00	DNS	90.00	Q
5	5	1	Ryusei Yamada	Japan	84.50	DNI	84.50	Q
6	6	8	Alessandro Barbieri	United States	82.50	DNI	82.50	Q
7	7	10	Campbell Melville Ives	New Zealand	25.50	78.50	78.50	Q
8	10	9	Patrick Burgener	Switzerland	77.25	DNI	77.25	Q
9	9	6	Lucas Foster	United States	75.25	DNI	75.25	Q
10	12	14	Kim Geon-hui	South Korea	71.25	DNI	71.25	Q
11	11	19	Jason Wolle	United States	9.50	70.50	70.50	Q
12	13	16	Lee Ji-o	South Korea	66.75	68.75	68.75	Q
13	18	20	Christoph Lechner	Germany	54.25	66.50	66.50	Q
14	19	15	Gian Andrin Biele	Switzerland	55.50	65.75	65.75	Q
15	21	18	Mischa Zürcher	Switzerland	63.75	DNI	63.75	Q
16	31	32	Liam Gill	Canada	50.75	62.75	62.75	Q
17	22	29	Ren Chongshuo	China	11.00	62.25	62.25	
18	20	13	Augustinho Teixeira	Brazil	61.50	DNI	61.50	
19	32	25	Gao Hongbo	China	29.50	60.00	60.00	
20	15	12	Florian Lechner	Austria	56.50	58.75	58.75	
21	23	21	Kim Kang-san	South Korea	7.50	52.00	52.00	
22	17	17	Siddhartha Ullah	United Kingdom	49.50	DNI	49.50	
23	25	30	Tit Štante	Slovenia	47.50	DNI	47.50	
24	24	24	Ryan Vo	Canada	44.25	DNI	44.25	
25	34	33	Seamus O'Connor	Ireland	43.00	DNI	43.00	
26	26	27	Lorenzo Gennero	Italy	40.00	DNI	40.00	
27	29	26	Qi Yuhang	China	21.50	37.00	37.00	
28	27	23	Taitten Cowan	Chile	35.75	33.75	35.75	
29	28	28	Kiran Pershad	Canada	34.00	DNI	34.00	
30	33	22	João Teixeira	Brazil	5.50	16.25	16.25	
31	30	31	Zhang Xinhao	China	8.00	DNI	8.00	
	3	2	Ayumu Hirano	Japan	Did not start			
	16	11	Louis Vito	Italy	Did not start			

== Final ==
Rank	Bib	Name	Country	Run 1	Run 2	Best
1st place, gold medalist(s)	4	Scotty James	Australia	89.50	95.00	95.00
2nd place, silver medalist(s)	2	Ruka Hirano	Japan	85.50	92.25	92.25
3rd place, bronze medalist(s)	1	Yūto Totsuka	Japan	88.75	92.00	92.00
4	18	Christoph Lechner	Germany	71.75	82.50	82.50
5	7	Campbell Melville Ives	New Zealand	69.00	80.25	80.25
6	12	Kim Geon-hui	South Korea	78.25	DNI	78.25
7	10	Patrick Burgener	Switzerland	13.75	75.75	75.75
8	9	Lucas Foster	United States	74.25	DNI	74.25
9	6	Alessandro Barbieri	United States	23.75	71.75	71.75
10	13	Lee Ji-o	South Korea	67.50	65.75	67.50
11	21	Mischa Zürcher	Switzerland	64.50	DNI	64.50
12	8	Chase Josey	United States	16.00	63.00	63.00
13	31	Liam Gill	Canada	58.00	55.50	58.00
14	19	Gian Andrin Biele	Switzerland	53.00	DNI	53.00
15	5	Ryusei Yamada	Japan	29.00	DNI	29.00
16	11	Jason Wolle	United States	17.00	DNI	17.00
