= FIS Freestyle Ski and Snowboarding World Championships 2021 – Men's snowboard halfpipe =

Men's snowboard halfpipe at the FIS Freestyle Ski and Snowboarding World Championships 2021
- Venue: Aspen/Snowmass
- Location: Aspen, United States
- Date: 11 March (qualification); 13 March
- Competitors: 27 from 12 nations
- Winning points: 96.25

Medalists
gold medal	Yūto Totsuka	Japan
silver medal	Scotty James	Australia
bronze medal	Jan Scherrer	Switzerland

The Men's snowboard halfpipe competition at the FIS Freestyle Ski and Snowboarding World Championships 2021 was held on 13 March. A qualification was held on 11 March 2021.

== Qualification ==
The qualification was started on 11 March at 10:40. The ten best snowboarders qualified for the final.

Rank	Bib	Start order	Name	Country	Run 1	Run 2	Best	Notes
1	2	7	Scotty James	Australia	93.00	94.25	94.25	Q
2	1	4	Yūto Totsuka	Japan	84.50	89.75	89.75	Q
3	6	3	Taylor Gold	United States	88.50	24.50	88.50	Q
4	4	6	Jan Scherrer	Switzerland	85.50	10.00	85.50	Q
5	7	9	Chase Josey	United States	81.75	84.75	84.75	Q
6	5	5	André Höflich	Germany	82.50	32.75	82.50	Q
7	8	2	David Hablützel	Switzerland	80.75	28.75	80.75	Q
8	14	24	Raibu Katayama	Japan	78.75	9.75	78.75	Q
9	9	10	Chase Blackwell	United States	78.50	28.50	78.50	Q
10	12	19	Derek Livingston	Canada	44.00	78.25	78.25	Q
11	19	14	Valentino Guseli	Australia	77.25	68.25	77.25	
12	3	8	Ruka Hirano	Japan	75.75	41.75	75.75	
13	10	1	Kaishu Hirano	Japan	73.50	72.75	73.50	
14	26	17	Louis Philip Vito	Italy	66.00	9.00	66.00	
15	15	27	Benedikt Bockstaller	Germany	63.25	19.75	63.25	
16	18	22	Liam Tourki	France	60.50	9.00	60.50	
17	67	12	Joey Okesson	United States	9.00	58.50	58.50	
18	16	21	Seamus O'Connor	Ireland	53.75	16.00	53.75	
19	17	16	Kim Kang-san	South Korea	53.00	10.50	53.00	
20	25	18	Jack Collins	Canada	49.75	19.50	49.75	
21	22	15	Joshua Reeves	Canada	45.75	18.75	45.75	
22	24	20	Florian Lechner	Germany	42.25	44.00	44.00	
23	21	25	Shawn Fair	Canada	17.00	43.50	43.50	
24	27	23	Augustinho Teixeira	Brazil	38.25	9.75	38.25	
25	23	11	Lorenzo Gennero	Italy	18.00	13.75	18.00	
26	13	13	Christoph Lechner	Germany	10.75	DNS	10.75	
27	20	26	Tit Štante	Slovenia	4.25	9.00	9.00	

== Final ==
The final was started on 13 March at 13:00.

Rank	Bib	Start order	Name	Country	Run 1	Run 2	Run 3	Best
1st place, gold medalist(s)	1	9	Yūto Totsuka	Japan	20.00	93.00	96.25	96.25
2nd place, silver medalist(s)	2	10	Scotty James	Australia	90.50	33.25	17.00	90.50
3rd place, bronze medalist(s)	4	7	Jan Scherrer	Switzerland	70.25	12.50	87.00	87.00
4	8	4	David Hablützel	Switzerland	63.00	81.50	79.75	81.50
5	7	6	Chase Josey	United States	26.25	81.00	62.75	81.00
6	9	2	Chase Blackwell	United States	47.75	7.25	80.50	80.50
7	5	5	André Höflich	Germany	79.75	31.00	15.75	79.75
8	6	8	Taylor Gold	United States	27.50	78.25	22.50	78.25
9	14	3	Raibu Katayama	Japan	31.00	36.25	25.25	36.25
10	12	1	Derek Livingston	Canada	9.50	13.75	29.25	29.25
