= Snowboarding at the 2014 Winter Olympics – Men's halfpipe =

Men's halfpipe at the XXII Olympic Winter Games
- Venue: Rosa Khutor Extreme Park
- Date: 11 February 2014
- Competitors: 39 from 16 nations
- Winning Score: 94.75

Medalists
1st place, gold medalist(s)		Iouri Podladtchikov	Switzerland
2nd place, silver medalist(s)		Ayumu Hirano	Japan
3rd place, bronze medalist(s)		Taku Hiraoka	Japan

The men's halfpipe competition of the Sochi 2014 Olympics was held at Rosa Khutor Extreme Park on 11 February 2014.

The gold was won by Swiss Iouri Podladtchikov, who was followed by two Japanese snowboarders, the 15-year-old Ayumu Hirano in silver and Taku Hiraoka in bronze.

== Qualification ==
An athlete must have placed in the top 30 in at a World Cup event after July 2012 or at the 2013 World Championships and a minimum of 100 FIS points. A total of 40 quota spots are available to athletes to compete at the games. A maximum of 4 athletes can be entered by a National Olympic Committee.

== Schedule ==
All times are (UTC+4).

Date	Time	Round
11 February	14:00	Qualification
11 February	19:00	Semifinals
11 February	21:30	Final

== Results ==
=== Qualification ===
The qualification was held at 14:00.

Rank	Heat	Bib	Name	Country	Run 1	Run 2	Best	Notes
1	1	2	Ayumu Hirano	Japan	92.25	64.75	92.25	QF
2	1	6	Christian Haller	Switzerland	74.00	83.75	83.75	QF
3	1	17	David Hablützel	Switzerland	48.75	81.00	81.00	QF
4	1	1	Arthur Longo	France	79.25	20.75	79.25	QS
5	1	19	Tim-Kevin Ravnjak	Slovenia	68.75	76.50	76.50	QS
6	1	18	Shi Wancheng	China	76.00	15.50	76.00	QS
7	1	5	Greg Bretz	United States	71.75	52.50	71.75	QS
8	1	13	Seamus O'Connor	Ireland	66.25	71.50	71.50	QS
9	1	4	Johann Baisamy	France	71.25	36.75	71.25	QS
10	1	20	Derek Livingston	Canada	34.25	70.25	70.25	
11	1	16	Lee Kwang-ki	South Korea	27.00	69.50	69.50	
12	1	15	Dimi de Jong	Netherlands	25.25	64.25	64.25	
13	1	11	Nikita Avtaneev	Russia	34.50	63.75	63.75	
14	1	3	Dolf van der Wal	Netherlands	25.50	62.50	62.50	
15	1	12	Pavel Kharitonov	Russia	58.75	54.50	58.75	
16	1	10	Ben Kilner	Great Britain	43.50	16.25	43.50	
17	1	8	Janne Korpi	Finland	28.00	41.00	41.00	
18	1	9	Sergey Tarasov	Russia	23.00	39.50	39.50	
19	1	7	Ryō Aono	Japan	37.50	13.00	37.50	
20	1	14	Dominic Harington	Great Britain	12.75	37.25	37.25	
1	2	25	Shaun White	United States	95.75	70.75	95.75	QF
2	2	28	Taku Hiraoka	Japan	92.25	63.50	92.25	QF
3	2	39	Danny Davis	United States	92.00	73.75	92.00	QF
4	2	27	Zhang Yiwei	China	90.00	89.75	90.00	QS
5	2	24	Taylor Gold	United States	81.50	87.50	87.50	QS
6	2	33	Kent Callister	Australia	87.00	25.5	87.00	QS
7	2	29	Nathan Johnstone	Australia	86.00	27.50	86.00	QS
8	2	26	Iouri Podladtchikov	Switzerland	15.00	82.00	82.00	QS
9	2	23	Jan Scherrer	Switzerland	43.50	69.75	69.75	QS
10	2	21	Scott James	Australia	68.50	15.00	68.50	
11	2	38	Johannes Hoepfl	Germany	61.25	65.50	65.50	
12	2	30	Crispin Lipscomb	Canada	29.25	65.25	65.25	
13	2	40	Markus Malin	Finland	33.50	62.50	62.50	
14	2	31	Kim Ho-jun	South Korea	61.75	20.00	61.75	
15	2	35	Jan Kralj	Slovenia	59.75	27.75	59.75	
16	2	37	Michał Ligocki	Poland	4.50	55.00	55.00	
17	2	22	Ayumu Nedefuji	Japan	54.50	28.75	54.50	
18	2	36	Ilkka-Eemeli Laari	Finland	49.00	52.00	52.00	
19	2	34	Brad Martin	Canada	31.25	22.50	31.25	
–	2	32	Peetu Piiroinen	Finland	DNS			

QF – Qualify directly to final; QS – Qualify to semifinal; DNS – Did not start

=== Semifinals ===
The semifinals was held at 16:00.

Rank	Bib	Name	Country	Run 1	Run 2	Best	Notes
1	26	Iouri Podladtchikov	Switzerland	87.50	41.25	87.50	Q
2	5	Greg Bretz	United States	83.00	44.25	83.00	Q
3	33	Kent Callister	Australia	49.25	79.50	79.50	Q
4	27	Zhang Yiwei	China	45.00	79.25	79.25	Q
5	18	Shi Wancheng	China	15.50	78.50	78.50	Q
6	19	Tim-Kevin Ravnjak	Slovenia	72.00	75.50	75.50	Q
7	29	Nathan Johnstone	Australia	25.75	73.50	73.50	
8	24	Taylor Gold	United States	26.00	60.75	60.75	
9	13	Seamus O'Connor	Ireland	54.00	43.00	54.00	
10	4	Johann Baisamy	France	18.50	37.0	37.0	
11	1	Arthur Longo	France	12.00	31.75	31.75	
–	23	Jan Scherrer	Switzerland	DNS^{[a]}			

=== Final ===
The final was held at 18:30.

Rank	Bib	Name	Country	Run 1	Run 2	Best
1st place, gold medalist(s)	26	Iouri Podladtchikov	Switzerland	86.50	94.75	94.75
2nd place, silver medalist(s)	2	Ayumu Hirano	Japan	90.75	93.50	93.50
3rd place, bronze medalist(s)	28	Taku Hiraoka	Japan	45.50	92.25	92.25
4	25	Shaun White	United States	35.00	90.25	90.25
5	17	David Hablützel	Switzerland	80.75	88.50	88.50
6	27	Zhang Yiwei	China	87.25	58.50	87.25
7	18	Shi Wancheng	China	81.00	25.00	81.00
8	19	Tim-Kevin Ravnjak	Slovenia	72.25	16.50	72.25
9	33	Kent Callister	Australia	40.00	68.50	68.50
10	39	Danny Davis	United States	53.00	45.25	53.00
11	6	Christian Haller	Switzerland	46.25	51.50	51.50
12	5	Greg Bretz	United States	21.75	26.50	26.50

== Notes ==
a Scherrer suffered a tear in his right ankle during warm-up and had to pull out of the semifinals.
