= Snowboarding at the 2018 Winter Olympics – Men's halfpipe =

Men's halfpipe at the XXIII Olympic Winter Games
- Venue: Bogwang Phoenix Park
- Date: 13 February (qualification); 14 February (final)
- Competitors: 29 from 13 nations
- Winning score: 97.75

Medalists
1st place, gold medalist(s)		Shaun White	United States
2nd place, silver medalist(s)		Ayumu Hirano	Japan
3rd place, bronze medalist(s)		Scott James	Australia

The men's halfpipe competition of the 2018 Winter Olympics was held from 13 to 14 February 2018 at the Bogwang Phoenix Park in Pyeongchang, South Korea. The event was won by Shaun White, who previously won this event in 2006 and 2010. Ayumu Hirano, the 2014 silver medalist, took silver. Scott James became the bronze medalist. For James, this is the first Olympic medal, and this was also the second medal for Australia at the 2018 Winter Olympics.

In the victory ceremony, the medals were presented by John Dowling Coates, member of the International Olympic Committee, accompanied by Dexter Paine, International Ski Federation vice president.

== Qualification ==
The top 30 athletes in the Olympic quota allocation list qualified, with a maximum of four athletes per National Olympic Committee (NOC) allowed. All athletes qualifying must also have placed in the top 30 of a FIS World Cup event or the FIS Freestyle Ski and Snowboarding World Championships 2017 during the qualification period (July 1, 2016 to 21 January 2018) and also have a minimum of 50 FIS points to compete. If the host country, South Korea at the 2018 Winter Olympics, did not qualify, their chosen athlete would displace the last qualified athlete, granted all qualification criteria were met.

Due to an injury, the 2014 Olympic Champion Iouri Podladtchikov was not able to defend his title. He was qualified but in Pyeongchang he decided not to compete. Podladtchikov crashed during the X-Games in January.

== Results ==
=== Qualification ===
Q — Qualified for the Final

The top 12 athletes in the qualifiers move on to the medal round.

Rank	Order	Name	Country	Run 1	Run 2	Best	Notes
1	14	Shaun White	United States	93.25	98.50	98.50	Q
2	13	Scott James	Australia	89.00	96.75	96.75	Q
3	7	Ayumu Hirano	Japan	87.50	95.25	95.25	Q
4	10	Ben Ferguson	United States	91.00	89.75	91.00	Q
5	8	Raibu Katayama	Japan	85.50	90.75	90.75	Q
6	5	Jan Scherrer	Switzerland	84.00	16.00	84.00	Q
7	6	Chase Josey	United States	47.75	83.75	83.75	Q
8	4	Jake Pates	United States	59.50	82.25	82.25	Q
9	15	Patrick Burgener	Switzerland	82.00	50.25	82.00	Q
10	1	Yuto Totsuka	Japan	80.00	65.25	80.00	Q
11	23	Peetu Piiroinen	Finland	14.25	77.50	77.50	Q
12	3	Kent Callister	Australia	66.75	77.00	77.00	Q
13	11	Taku Hiraoka	Japan	26.00	75.75	75.75	
14	24	Lee Kwang-ki	South Korea	75.00	72.00	75.00	
15	16	Zhang Yiwei	China	32.50	74.00	74.00	
16	9	Tim-Kevin Ravnjak	Slovenia	72.50	27.00	72.50	
17	2	Derek Livingston	Canada	71.25	32.75	71.25	
18	25	Seamus O'Connor	Ireland	65.50	39.75	65.50	
19	12	Markus Malin	Finland	30.25	63.50	63.50	
20	29	Nikita Avtaneev	Olympic Athletes from Russia	63.25	32.75	63.25	
21	28	Kweon Lee-jun	South Korea	58.50	62.75	62.75	
22	27	Nathan Johnstone	Australia	62.25	10.25	62.25	
23	18	Johannes Hoepfl	Germany	53.25	59.50	59.50	
24	26	Kim Ho-jun	South Korea	54.50	10.25	54.50	
25	22	Tit Štante	Slovenia	24.50	52.25	52.25	
26	21	Rakai Tait	New Zealand	36.50	25.75	36.50	
27	20	Elias Allenspach	Switzerland	23.75	25.50	25.50	
28	19	Janne Korpi	Finland	4.50	22.50	22.50	
29	17	Shi Wancheng	China	10.00	11.75	11.75	

=== Final ===
The final was held at 11:30 on 14 February 2018. Yuto Totsuka was injured during his second run, coming down on the edge of the halfpipe and injuring his hip. He was taken off the halfpipe by a team of paramedics and taken to a local hospital. As a result, he was unable to compete in the third round of the finals.

Rank	Order	Name	Country	Run 1	Run 2	Run 3	Best	Notes
1st place, gold medalist(s)	12	Shaun White	United States	94.25	55.00	97.75	97.75	
2nd place, silver medalist(s)	10	Ayumu Hirano	Japan	35.25	95.25	43.25	95.25	
3rd place, bronze medalist(s)	11	Scott James	Australia	92.00	81.75	40.25	92.00	
4	9	Ben Ferguson	United States	43.00	83.50	90.75	90.75	
5	4	Patrick Burgener	Switzerland	84.00	51.00	89.75	89.75	
6	6	Chase Josey	United States	87.75	52.25	88.00	88.00	
7	8	Raibu Katayama	Japan	85.75	25.00	87.00	87.00	
8	5	Jake Pates	United States	47.00	82.25	27.00	82.25	
9	7	Jan Scherrer	Switzerland	31.25	80.50	70.75	80.50	
10	1	Kent Callister	Australia	20.00	62.00	56.75	62.00	
11	3	Yuto Totsuka	Japan	39.25	7.00	DNS	39.25	
12	2	Peetu Piiroinen	Finland	4.50	12.75	13.50	13.50	
