= FIS Freestyle Ski and Snowboarding World Championships 2023 – Men's snowboard halfpipe =

Men's snowboard halfpipe at the FIS Freestyle Ski and Snowboarding World Championships 2023
- Location: Bakuriani, Georgia
- Dates: 1 March (qualification); 3 March
- Competitors: 22 from 11 nations
- Winning points: 93.50

Medalists
gold medal	Lee Chae-un	South Korea
silver medal	Valentino Guseli	Australia
bronze medal	Jan Scherrer	Switzerland

The Men's snowboard halfpipe competition at the FIS Freestyle Ski and Snowboarding World Championships 2023 was held on 1 and 3 March 2023.

== Qualification ==
The qualification was started on 1 March at 11:40. The ten best snowboarders qualified for the final.

Rank	Bib	Start order	Name	Country	Run 1	Run 2	Best	Notes
1	5	1	Yūto Totsuka	Japan	74.75	93.25	93.25	Q
2	1	8	Ruka Hirano	Japan	90.50	91.50	91.50	Q
3	3	9	Valentino Guseli	Australia	89.75	91.00	91.00	Q
4	2	7	Scotty James	Australia	36.50	90.00	90.00	Q
5	10	10	Chase Josey	United States	85.25	89.75	89.75	Q
6	7	2	Kaishu Hirano	Japan	59.75	88.00	88.00	Q
7	6	6	Lee Chae-un	South Korea	87.25	31.75	87.25	Q
8	4	3	Jan Scherrer	Switzerland	80.75	85.00	85.00	Q
9	9	4	Shuichiro Shigeno	Japan	84.25	79.25	84.25	Q
10	14	11	André Höflich	Germany	73.00	78.00	78.00	Q
11	11	13	Joey Okesson	United States	74.00	20.75	74.00	
12	8	5	Chase Blackwell	United States	63.75	69.75	69.75	
13	13	12	Liam Gill	Canada	67.00	18.75	67.00	
14	15	19	Christoph Lechner	Germany	57.75	43.00	57.75	
15	23	22	Liam Tourki	France	26.00	56.50	56.50	
16	17	14	Kim Kang-san	South Korea	49.00	52.50	52.50	
17	19	20	Tit Štante	Slovenia	50.75	19.75	50.75	
18	24	16	Li Zhuolin	China	15.75	42.50	42.50	
19	22	18	Gao Hongbo	China	33.75	14.50	33.75	
20	20	21	Elias Allenspach	Switzerland	26.75	9.50	26.75	
21	12	17	Louie Vito	Italy	23.25	23.50	23.50	
22	16	15	Lucas Foster	United States	22.25	21.25	22.25	

== Final ==
The final was started on 3 March at 10:00.

Rank	Bib	Start order	Name	Country	Run 1	Run 2	Run 3	Best
1st place, gold medalist(s)	6	4	Lee Chae-un	South Korea	77.25	86.00	93.50	93.50
2nd place, silver medalist(s)	3	8	Valentino Guseli	Australia	13.75	83.25	93.00	93.00
3rd place, bronze medalist(s)	4	3	Jan Scherrer	Switzerland	89.25	33.50	29.50	89.25
4	1	9	Ruka Hirano	Japan	43.50	78.00	87.50	87.50
5	2	7	Scotty James	Australia	37.00	86.50	23.25	86.50
6	5	10	Yūto Totsuka	Japan	24.75	22.75	85.50	85.50
7	7	5	Kaishu Hirano	Japan	84.50	32.00	23.75	84.50
8	10	6	Chase Josey	United States	38.50	82.25	13.75	82.25
9	14	1	André Höflich	Germany	69.00	80.75	38.75	80.75
10	9	2	Shuichiro Shigeno	Japan	34.50	40.00	33.75	40.00
