= Snowboarding at the 2022 Winter Olympics – Men's halfpipe =

Men's halfpipe at the XXIV Olympic Winter Games
- Snowboarding
- Venue: Genting Snow Park, Zhangjiakou
- Date: 9, 11 February
- Competitors: 25 from 12 nations
- Winning score: 96.00

Medalists
1st place, gold medalist(s)		Ayumu Hirano	Japan
2nd place, silver medalist(s)		Scotty James	Australia
3rd place, bronze medalist(s)		Jan Scherrer	Switzerland

The men's halfpipe competition in snowboarding at the 2022 Beijing Winter Olympics was held on 9 February (qualification) and 11 February (final), at the Genting Snow Park in Zhangjiakou. Ayumu Hirano of Japan, the 2014 and 2018 silver medalist, won the gold, his third Olympic medal. Scotty James of Australia improved from the 2018 bronze to the 2022 silver. Jan Scherrer of Switzerland won the bronze, his first Olympic medal.

The field also included the defending champion, Shaun White, who won this event in 2006, 2010, and 2018. This was White's last Olympics as he announced his upcoming retirement before the games began. White qualified for the finals where he finished fourth, repeating his 2014 performance.

At the 2021–22 FIS Snowboard World Cup, only three halfpipe events were held before the Olympics. Ayumu Hirano was leading the ranking, followed by Ruka Hirano and Scherrer. Yūto Totsuka was the 2021 world champion, with James and Scherrer being the silver and bronze medalists, respectively. James was also the 2022 X-Games winner in super-pipe, ahead of Ayumu Hirano and Kaishu Hirano.

== Qualification ==
A total of 25 snowboarders qualified to compete at the games. For an athlete to compete they must have a minimum of 50.00 FIS points on the FIS Points List on January 17, 2022 and a top 30 finish in a World Cup event or at the FIS Snowboard World Championships 2021. A country could enter a maximum of four athletes into the event.

== Results ==
=== Qualification ===
Q — Qualified for the Final

The top 12 athletes in the qualifiers move on to the medal round.

Rank	Bib	Order	Name	Country	Run 1	Run 2	Best	Notes
1	3	1	Ayumu Hirano	Japan	87.25	93.25	93.25	Q
2	2	4	Scotty James	Australia	88.25	91.25	91.25	Q
3	5	2	Ruka Hirano	Japan	80.75	87.00	87.00	Q
4	9	23	Shaun White	United States	24.25	86.25	86.25	Q
5	14	9	Valentino Guseli	Australia	31.75	85.75	85.75	Q
6	1	3	Yūto Totsuka	Japan	84.50	12.00	84.50	Q
7	8	20	Taylor Gold	United States	81.25	83.50	83.50	Q
8	4	5	Jan Scherrer	Switzerland	73.50	79.25	79.25	Q
9	13	11	Kaishu Hirano	Japan	74.75	77.25	77.25	Q
10	6	16	André Höflich	Germany	75.00	17.75	75.00	Q
11	7	19	Patrick Burgener	Switzerland	70.75	73.00	73.00	Q
12	11	25	Chase Josey	United States	15.75	69.50	69.50	Q
13	19	15	Louie Vito	Italy	60.25	3.25	60.25	
14	21	7	Gu Ao	China	50.25	58.50	58.50	
15	16	17	Seamus O'Connor	Ireland	57.00	10.25	57.00	
16	22	18	Fan Xiaobing	China	39.00	44.00	44.00	
17	12	14	Lucas Foster	United States	42.00	21.50	42.00	
18	25	8	Lee Chae-un	South Korea	26.00	35.00	35.00	
19	23	21	Lorenzo Gennero	Italy	34.75	2.00	34.75	
20	17	13	Liam Tourki	France	25.50	11.50	25.50	
21	15	22	Wang Ziyang	China	20.25	7.50	20.25	
22	18	10	Tit Štante	Slovenia	18.25	5.75	18.25	
23	20	12	Liam Gill	Canada	16.75	15.50	16.75	
24	10	24	David Hablützel	Switzerland	15.50	14.00	15.50	
25	24	6	Gao Hongbo	China	15.00	DNS	15.00	

=== Final ===
Rank	Bib	Order	Name	Country	Run 1	Run 2	Run 3	Best	Notes
1st place, gold medalist(s)	3	12	Ayumu Hirano	Japan	33.75	91.75	96.00	96.00	
2nd place, silver medalist(s)	2	11	Scotty James	Australia	16.50	92.50	47.75	92.50	
3rd place, bronze medalist(s)	4	5	Jan Scherrer	Switzerland	70.50	87.25	7.50	87.25	
4	9	9	Shaun White	United States	72.00	85.00	14.75	85.00	
5	8	6	Taylor Gold	United States	81.75	25.00	20.00	81.75	
6	14	8	Valentino Guseli	Australia	75.75	79.75	79.75	79.75	
7	11	1	Chase Josey	United States	62.50	23.00	79.50	79.50	
8	6	3	André Höflich	Germany	13.25	76.00	50.00	76.00	
9	13	4	Kaishu Hirano	Japan	75.50	37.75	15.75	75.50	
10	1	7	Yūto Totsuka	Japan	62.00	69.75	26.50	69.75	
11	7	2	Patrick Burgener	Switzerland	54.50	5.75	69.50	69.50	
12	5	10	Ruka Hirano	Japan	13.00	11.75	9.25	13.00	

== Controversy ==
During Ayumu Hirano's second finals run, he completed a "spectacular frontside triple cork to become the first person to land the trick at an Olympics." NBC commentator Todd Richards, a former snowboarder, immediately announced that "no one will touch that run tonight... that is going to be a 98." He would go on to add, "He destroyed this halfpipe. That run was something that we may never see again from anyone else. Unbelievable. Level raised. By such a large margin. They are going to give him a score that is going to be just out of this world." However, judges scored the run a 91.75, leaving him in second behind Scotty James.

Immediately on-air, NBC's Richards blasted the judges, proclaiming “Ahhh what? What? Is there a mistake? There's no way, there is no way. A 91.75? ...as far as I'm concerned, the judges just grenaded all their credibility." He went on to add, "It's unbelievable that this is even happening. It's a travesty to be completely honest with you. I am irate right now. Someone call the authorities, there's been a robbery." People online began to dub this controversy "triple-gate". X games silver medalist Nikko Landeros tweeted that Hirano "just got robbed... this should never happen in the Olympics... what a disgrace." Ultimately, Hirano secured the gold medal on his third run by scoring a 96.00 by performing a triple cork and a 1440.
