= Sergey Tarasov =

Sergey Tarasov or Sergei Tarasov may refer to:

- Sergei Tarasov (film director)
- Sergei Tarasov (biathlete)
- Sergey Tarasov (musician)
- Sergey Tarasov (snowboarder)
