= Yūto Totsuka =

Japanese snowboarder (born 2001)

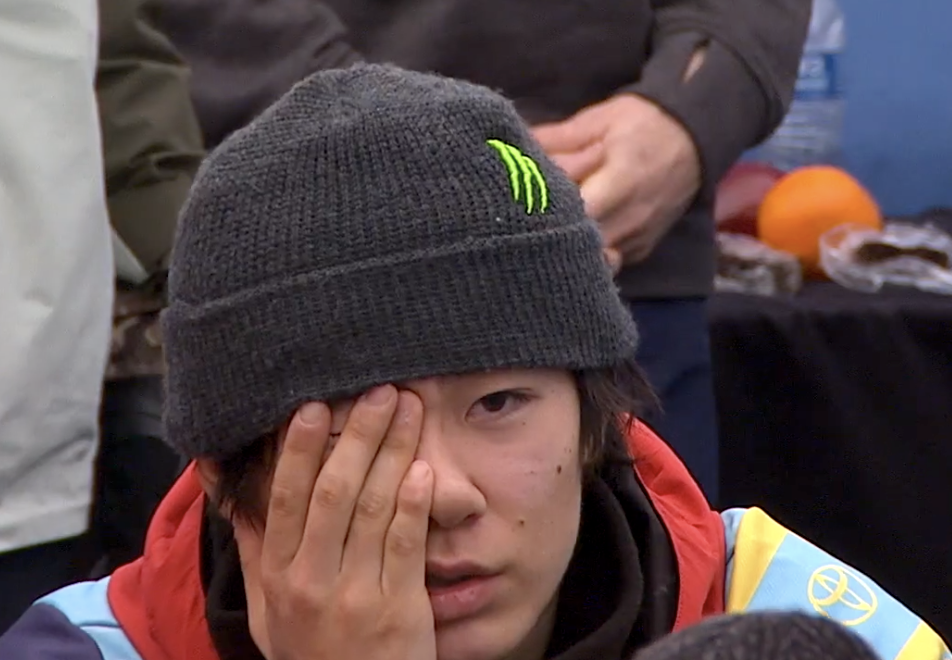
- Totsuka in 2019

Personal information
- Nationality: Japanese
- Born: 27 September 2001 (age 25) Yokohama, Japan
- Height: 1.69 m (5 ft 7 in)
- Weight: 64 kg (141 lb)

Sport
- Country: Japan
- Sport: Snowboarding
- Event: Halfpipe
- Club: Yonex
Medal record
Men's snowboarding
Representing Japan
Olympic Games
Gold medal – first place	2026 Milano Cortina	Halfpipe
World Championships
Gold medal – first place	2021 Aspen	Halfpipe
Silver medal – second place	2019 Utah	Halfpipe
Bronze medal – third place	2025 Engadin	Halfpipe
Winter X Games
Gold medal – first place	2021 Aspen	Superpipe
Silver medal – second place	2019 Aspen	Superpipe
Silver medal – second place	2020 Aspen	Superpipe

Yūto Totsuka (戸塚優斗, Totsuka Yūto; born 27 September 2001) is a Japanese snowboarder and Olympic gold medalist.

== Early life ==
Totsuka was born on September 27, 2001, in Kanagawa prefecture, Yokohama, Japan. He grew up snowboarding and started the recreational activity when he was just three years old. Although his parents made him try other sports, Totsuka felt the best joy whenever he was snowboarding, and later narrowed it down to snowboarding. When Totsuka entered 3rd grade, he began practicing the halfpipe and became absorbed with it. As Totsuku got older, he was inspired by former Japanese snowboarder, Maki Mitsui, who later became his coach. He continued to develop his skills, but unfortunately missed an entire season due to a broken arm at the age of 12. As Totsuka got older, he began taking training from former Japanese snowboarder, Raibu Katayama, who helped improve Totsuka's skillset. In his third year of junior high school, Totsuka won the halfpipe competition at the All-Japan Ski Championships, finishing ahead of former world champion Ryo Aono and 2014 Olympic bronze medalist Taku Hiraoka. The World Cup triumph came a year later, followed by Olympic qualification. After that, he reached new heights, finishing in the top three of every major tournament he was in between 2019 and 2021.

== Career ==
He competed in the men's halfpipe at the 2018 Winter Olympics. He finished 11th overall. He fell during the final, hitting the edge of the halfpipe and injuring his hip, and had to be evacuated by medics.

Totsuka took the silver medal at the 2020 Winter X Games in Aspen, Colorado behind the gold medalist Scotty James.

He competed again in the 2026 Winter Olympics, winning the gold medal in the final on February 13 with a score of 95.00 on his second run. The centrepiece of his second run was a cab triple cork 1440. In this Olympics, his score narrowly outcompeted Scotty James’s 93.50.
