= Eli Bouchard =

Canadian snowboarder (born 2007)

Personal information
- Born: December 12, 2007 (age 18) Quebec City, Quebec, Canada

Sport
- Country: Canada
- Sport: Snowboarding
- Event(s): Big air, Slopestyle
Medal record
Men's snowboarding
Representing Canada
Winter Youth Olympics
Gold medal – first place	2024 Gangwon	Big air
Silver medal – second place	2024 Gangwon	Slopestyle
Junior World Championships
Bronze medal – third place	2024 Livigno/Mottolino	Big air

Eli Bouchard (born December 12, 2007) is a Canadian snowboarder.

== Early life ==
Bouchard became the youngest snowboarder to land a double backflip at eight years old. He then became the youngest snowboarder to land a frontside 1080 double cork at ten years old.

== Career ==
Bouchard represented Canada at the 2024 Winter Youth Olympics and won a gold medal in the big air event with a score of 183.25. He also won a silver medal in the slopestyle event with a score of 90.00.

During the final race of the 2024–25 FIS Snowboard World Cup on February 6, 2025, he earned his first career World Cup victory.

In January 2026, he was selected to represent Canada at the 2026 Winter Olympics.
