= Scotty James =

Australian snowboarder (born 1994)

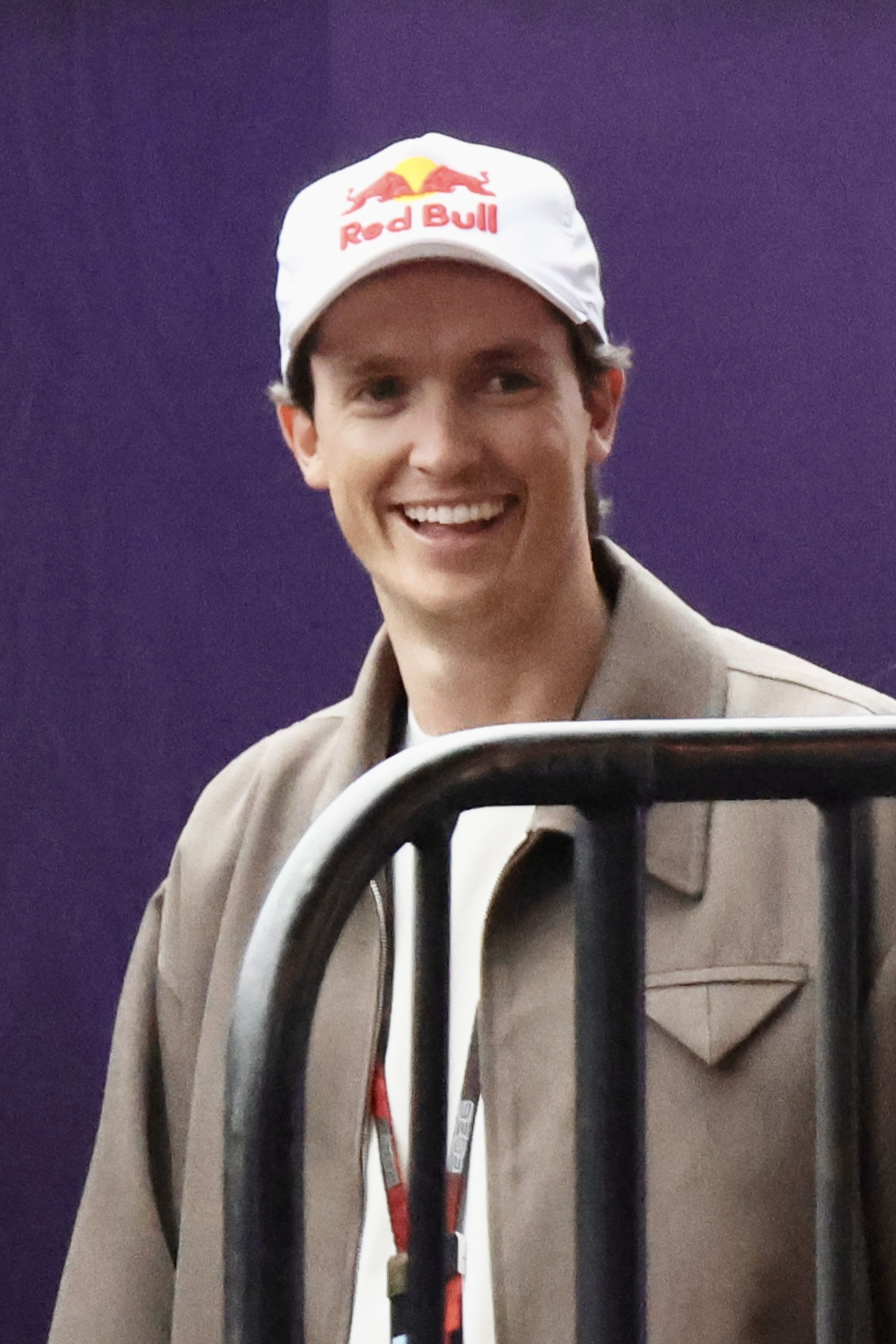
- Scotty James at the Melbourne Walk during the 2026 Australian Grand Prix

Personal information
- Nationality: Australian
- Born: 6 July 1994 (age 32) Warrandyte, Victoria, Australia
- Education: Southwood Boys Grammar
- Occupation: Professional halfpipe snowboarder
- Height: 1.88 m (6 ft 2 in)
- Weight: 75 kg (165 lb)
- Spouse: Chloe Stroll (m. 2023)
- Relatives: Lawrence Stroll (father-in-law); Lance Stroll (brother-in-law)
- Website: scottyjames31.com

Sport
- Country: Australia
- Sport: Snowboarding
- Rank: 4th Overall (FIS World Cup Standings) 2nd Halfpipe (FIS World Cup Standings)
- Events: Halfpipe, Superpipe
- Coached by: Tim James; Abe Teter
Medal record
Men's snowboarding
Representing Australia
Olympic Games
Silver medal – second place	2022 Beijing	Halfpipe
Silver medal – second place	2026 Milano Cortina	Halfpipe
Bronze medal – third place	2018 Pyeongchang	Halfpipe
World Championships
Gold medal – first place	2015 Kreischberg	Halfpipe
Gold medal – first place	2017 Sierra Nevada	Halfpipe
Gold medal – first place	2019 Utah	Halfpipe
Gold medal – first place	2025 Engadin	Halfpipe
Silver medal – second place	2021 Aspen	Halfpipe
Winter X Games
Gold medal – first place	2017 Aspen	SuperPipe
Gold medal – first place	2019 Aspen	SuperPipe
Gold medal – first place	2020 Aspen	SuperPipe
Gold medal – first place	2022 Aspen	SuperPipe
Gold medal – first place	2023 Aspen	SuperPipe
Gold medal – first place	2024 Aspen	SuperPipe
Gold medal – first place	2025 Aspen	SuperPipe
Gold medal – first place	2026 Aspen	SuperPipe
Silver medal – second place	2018 Aspen	SuperPipe
Silver medal – second place	2021 Aspen	SuperPipe
Bronze medal – third place	2016 Aspen	SuperPipe
Bronze medal – third place	2017 Aspen	Dual slalom
FIS Snowboard World Cup
Third place	2013–14 Global	Overall
Winner	2013–14 Global	Halfpipe
Winner	2016–17 Global	Halfpipe
Winner	2019–20 Global	Halfpipe
Winner	2019–20 Global	Overall
Second place	2020–21 Global	Halfpipe
Third place	2022–23 Global	Halfpipe
Third place	2023–24 Global	Halfpipe
Laax Open
Gold medal – first place	2019 Laax	Halfpipe
Gold medal – first place	2020 Laax	Halfpipe
Silver medal – second place	2017 Laax	Halfpipe
Silver medal – second place	2021 Laax	Halfpipe
Silver medal – second place	2023 Laax	Halfpipe
U.S. Snowboarding Grand Prix
Gold medal – first place	2018 Copper Mountain	Halfpipe
Gold medal – first place	2019 Copper Mountain	Halfpipe
Gold medal – first place	2022 Copper Mountain	Halfpipe
Burton U.S. Open
Gold medal – first place	2019 Vail	Halfpipe
Bronze medal – third place	2020 Vail	Halfpipe
Bronze medal – third place	2018 Vail	Halfpipe
Dew Tour
Gold medal – first place	2018 Breckenridge	SuperPipe
Gold medal – first place	2020 Breckenridge	SuperPipe
Silver medal – second place	2017 Breckenridge	SuperPipe
Bronze medal – third place	2014 Breckenridge	Halfpipe

Scott James (born 6 July 1994) is an Australian snowboarder, five-time Olympian, and children’s book author. He was the flag bearer for Australia at the 2018 Winter Olympics, where he won a bronze medal in the halfpipe. After winning halfpipe silver medals at both the 2022 and 2026 Winter Olympics, he became Australia's most decorated Winter Olympian.

== Career ==
James's began riding at age three, and his first snowboard was a display board in a shop in Vancouver. James and his father had trouble finding a board small enough for him, so they bought the display board for $10. He began competing at age six and started travelling for competitions at 10 years old. At the time, Europe and America were the main locations for snowboarding training and competitions. His mother accompanied him on the road, homeschooling him and providing tutors when needed. James has stated, "There's been a lot of sacrifice from my parents to get me here — and I'm very grateful." Due to his success at a young age, James began to be viewed by media and peers as a snowboarding prodigy.

He moved from racing into halfpipe and slopestyle events, making his international debut as a 14-year-old at the 2008 Europa Cup in Saas Fee, Switzerland. When Australian Nathan Johnstone was ruled out of the 2010 Winter Olympics with an ankle injury, James went to the World Cup event in Stoneham, Canada, to try to achieve the top-19 result that would make him eligible to replace Johnstone at the Olympics. He pulled off his best result to date, a 15th-place finish, which secured him a spot in the 2010 Winter Olympics in Vancouver. At the age of 15, James was Australia's youngest male Olympian in 50 years and the youngest male competitor at the Vancouver Games. While training for the halfpipe event in Vancouver, James caught his heel-edge and slapped against the wall, fracturing his right wrist. Despite the injury, James competed in the event, finishing 21st.

From early 2011 to 2012, all of James' World Cup results in Halfpipe, Slopestyle and Big Air climbed into the top ten territory.

Competing at the last event of the 2013–14 season before the Sochi Games, James won his first World Cup event medal, a bronze in the halfpipe. He also finished in the top 10 at two other World Cup events that season. His results and points earned him the World Cup Title in Halfpipe for the first time in his career and made James the #1 ranked halfpipe rider in the world at just 19 years old.

James won the bronze medal in the men's halfpipe competition at the 2018 Winter Olympics in PyeongChang, behind Shaun White of the United States gold medal in the event and Ayumu Hirano of Japan's silver. He won a silver in the men's halfpipe competition in Beijing 2022 Winter Olympics.

In December 2022, James earned a near-perfect score of 99.00 on his second run in the men's final of the U.S. Snowboarding Grand Prix. It was the second-highest score in the history of International Ski and Snowboard Federation events. The highest, a 100.00, was awarded to Shaun White at the 2018 Aspen Snowmass halfpipe event. The 99.00 score was the highest ever earned by James in a halfpipe event. His run started with a switch McTwist Japan with massive amplitude that caused audible gasps from the crowd, into a cab 1440 stalefish, frontside 1080 tail grab, cab 900 indy, and ending with a switch backside double cork 1260 indy.

At the 2023 X Games in Aspen, Colorado, James won his fifth career gold medal in the halfpipe event.

At the 2023 World Championships in Bakuriani, Georgia, James was unable to land on the podium and finished in 5th place with a score of 86.50.

In 2024, James authored his first children’s book, Mooki vs the Big Scary, which received positive reviews. This was followed up with a sequel, Mooki vs the Terrible Toys.

At the 2026 Winter Olympics, James earned a silver medal in the Halfpipe event with a score of 93.50.

== Cryptocurrency ==
In October 2022, OKX, a cryptocurrency exchange, announced that James would be an influencer for OKX.

== Personal life ==
James grew up in Warrandyte, Victoria, and is a keen golfer and skateboarder. He attended secondary school at Southwood Boys Grammar (now part of Tintern Grammar).

James dated American comedian and professional surfer, Ivy Miller from 2016 to 2018. In late 2019, James began dating Canadian heiress and singer Chloe Stroll. Stroll's brother, F1 driver Lance Stroll, introduced the two, stating to Chloe at the time, “I think I just found the guy you're going to marry.” James and Stroll became engaged in 2021 and married in May 2023. The couple currently reside together in Monaco, giving James quick access to halfpipe training grounds in Saas-Fee, Switzerland and the French Alps.

James is good friends with F1 driver and fellow Australian Daniel Ricciardo. He is also a cousin of AFL player Marc Pittonet.

James is a passionate Essendon Football Club supporter.

James converted to Judaism sometime before his marriage to Chloe, and confirmed it in an interview on the radio podcast The Red Flags Pod. "We're Jews," said one of the interviewers. James chimed in, "So am I. I actually am; I converted." He later said, "It was important to Chloe and the family, and I value that" as part of his reason behind his conversion.

In October 2024, Scotty and Chloe welcomed their first child, a son named Leo.

== Awards ==
In 2018, James became the first snowboarder to win the VIS Award of Excellence. The Victorian Institute of Sport's Award of Excellence honours the athlete who has achieved outstanding sporting results at major events during the year while contributing to the promotion and development of their sport and/or made a significant contribution to society beyond pure sporting performance. James earned the award for being an active role model and mentor within his sport, as well as a great ambassador for winter sports and the sporting community. He played an active leadership role within the newly structured National Park & Pipe Program, which targeted young athletes with the potential to be medal contenders at the Beijing 2022 Olympic Winter Games. James worked closely with the Olympic Winter Institute of Australia and Mt Buller to secure the best possible national training facility for Halfpipe in Victoria, Australia, and he spent considerable time and effort to assist with the project.

Year	Award	Awarding Organization	Result	Ref.
2015	Athlete of the Year	Snow Australia	Won	
2017	Athlete of the Year	Snow Australia	Won	
2018	Award of Excellence	Victorian Institute of Sport	Won	
2019	Male Athlete of the Year	Australian Institute of Sport Awards	Won	
2019	Award of Excellence	Victorian Institute of Sport	Won	
2019	Best Male Action Sports Athlete	ESPY Award	Nominated	
2020	Athlete of the Year	Snow Australia	Won	

== Results ==
=== Olympic Winter Games ===
As of 22 February 2026

Year	Age	Halfpipe	Slopestyle
(Canada) 2010 Vancouver	15	21	–
(Russia) 2014 Sochi	19	21	16
(South Korea) 2018 Pyeonchang	23	3	–
(China) 2022 Beijing	27	2	–
(Italy) 2026 Milano Cortina	31	2	–

=== World Championships ===
As of 22 February 2026

Year	Age	Halfpipe	Slopestyle
(South Korea) 2009 Gangwon	14	48	–
(Canada) 2013 Stoneham	18	6	16
(Austria) 2015 Kreischberg	20	1	–
(Spain) 2017 Sierra Nevada	22	1	–
(United States) 2019 Utah	24	1	–
(United States) 2021 Aspen	26	2	–
(Georgia (country)) 2021 Bakuriani	28	5	–
(Switzerland) 2025 Engadin	30	1	–
