= Snowboarding at the 2024 Winter Youth Olympics – Men's halfpipe =

Men's halfpipe at the IV Winter Youth Olympic Games
- Venue: Welli Hilli Park
- Dates: 1 February
- Competitors: 16 from 10 nations
- Winning points: 88.50

Medalists
1st place, gold medalist(s)		Lee Chae-un	South Korea
2nd place, silver medalist(s)		Alessandro Barbieri	United States
3rd place, bronze medalist(s)		Ryusei Yamada	Japan

The men's halfpipe event in snowboarding at the 2024 Winter Youth Olympics took place on 1 February at the Welli Hilli Park.

== Qualification ==
The qualification was started at 10:15.

Rank	Bib	Name	Country	Run 1	Run 2	Best	Notes
1	1	Lee Chae-un	South Korea	86.00	89.50	89.50	Q
2	2	Ryusei Yamada	Japan	81.75	85.75	85.75	Q
3	4	Alessandro Barbieri	United States	84.00	56.50	84.00	Q
4	13	Jonas Hasler	Switzerland	73.75	77.75	77.75	Q
5	5	Campbell Melville Ives	New Zealand	75.75	43.00	75.75	Q
6	7	Lee Ji-o	South Korea	72.00	73.00	73.00	Q
7	3	Kyu Shimasaki	Japan	69.75	64.25	69.75	Q
8	8	Mischa Zürcher	Switzerland	63.50	67.50	67.50	Q
9	6	Noah Avallone	United States	20.50	59.50	59.50	Q
10	11	Ren Chongshuo	China	26.25	58.00	58.00	Q
11	14	Zhang Xinhao	China	21.75	51.50	51.50	
12	9	Reef Hasler	Switzerland	50.75	23.50	50.75	
13	10	Siddhartha Ullah	Great Britain	9.50	46.50	46.50	
14	15	Tai Vaughan	Australia	40.00	43.50	43.50	
15	12	João Teixeira	Brazil	35.25	12.75	35.25	
16	16	Aljaž Sladič	Slovenia	25.00	29.25	29.25	

== Final ==
The final was started at 13:30.

Rank	Bib	Name	Country	Run 1	Run 2	Run 3	Total
1st place, gold medalist(s)	1	Lee Chae-un	South Korea	87.25	88.50	42.00	88.50
2nd place, silver medalist(s)	4	Alessandro Barbieri	United States	26.50	78.75	84.75	84.75
3rd place, bronze medalist(s)	2	Ryusei Yamada	Japan	42.00	83.00	14.00	83.00
4	5	Campbell Melville Ives	New Zealand	81.50	68.50	77.50	81.50
5	7	Lee Ji-o	South Korea	72.50	48.00	79.50	79.50
6	13	Jonas Hasler	Switzerland	78.00	70.50	16.00	78.00
7	8	Mischa Zürcher	Switzerland	59.75	70.25	42.00	70.25
8	6	Noah Avallone	United States	64.00	68.75	39.50	68.75
9	3	Kyu Shimasaki	Japan	13.00	43.50	57.25	57.25
10	11	Ren Chongshuo	China	51.25	11.00	12.50	51.25
