= Lawrence Stroll =

Canadian businessman (born 1959)

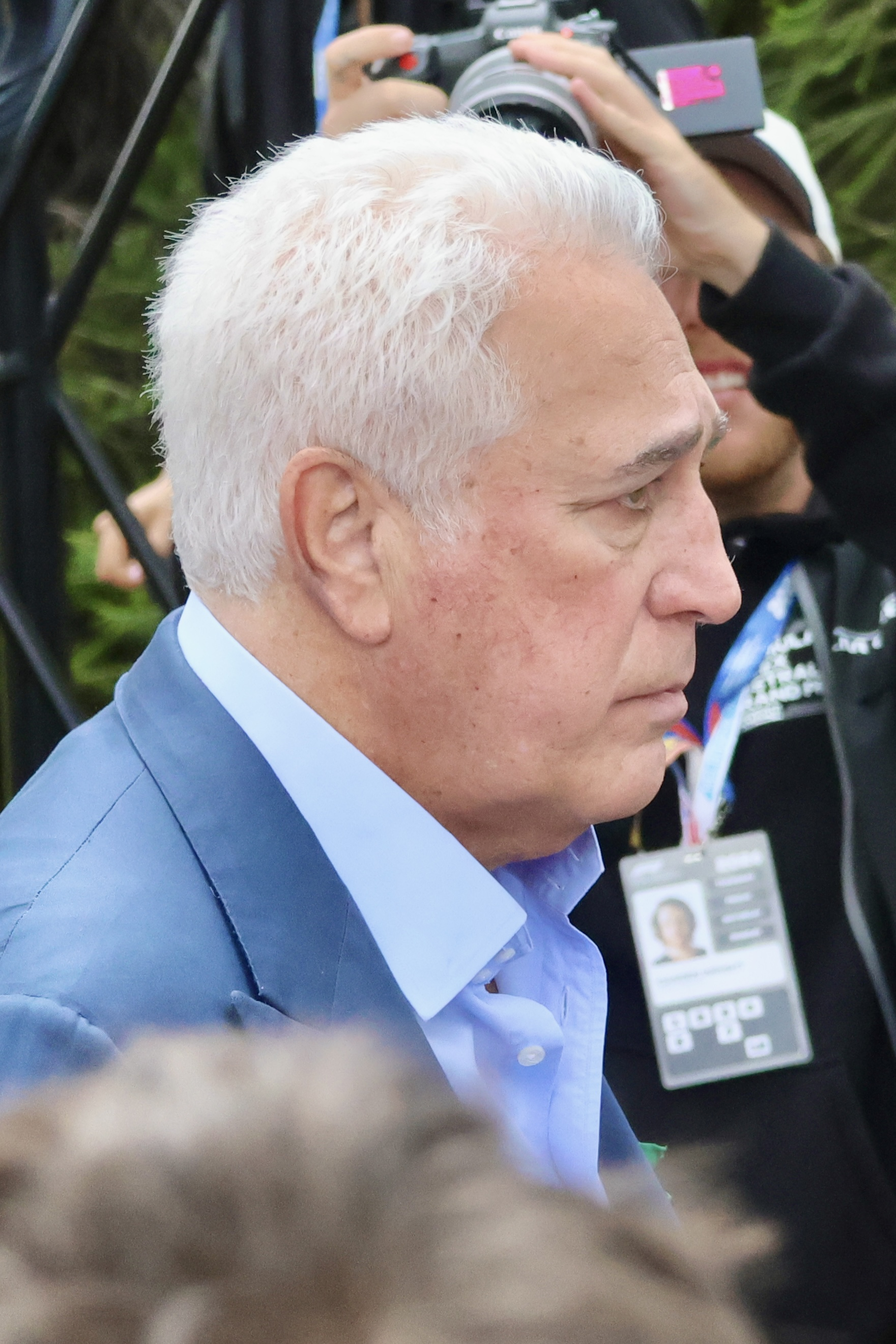
- Stroll in 2026
- Born: Lawrence Sheldon Strulovitch; 11 July 1959 (age 67); Montreal, Quebec, Canada
- Occupations: Chairman, Aston Martin
- Known for: Aston Martin F1 Team
- Spouses: Claire-Anne Callens (divorced) Raquel Diniz (m. 2020)
- Children: Chloe; Lance
- Relatives: Scotty James (son-in-law)

Lawrence Sheldon Strulovitch (Note: Name later anglicized to Strulovitch.) (born 11 July 1959), commonly known as Lawrence Stroll, is a Canadian businessman who is part-owner and executive chairman of Aston Martin, as well as the owner of their Formula One team. According to Forbes, he has a net worth of US$3.7 billion, as of September 2026.

== Early life ==
Lawrence Sheldon Strulovitch was born on 11 July 1959 in Montreal, Quebec to a Jewish family as the son of the fashion importer Leo Strulovitch, who later anglicised the family name.

== Career ==
Stroll's father brought Pierre Cardin fashionwear and Ralph Lauren clothing to Canada. Stroll later took the Ralph Lauren brand to Europe.

Along with Hong Kong investor Silas Chou, Stroll invested in clothing designers Tommy Hilfiger and Michael Kors, and the pair largely contributed to the brands' growth to global prominence. Stroll's company, Sportswear Holdings, sold the last of its stake in these businesses in 2014. During the 2000s, Chou and Stroll also invested in Asprey & Garrard.

From 2000 until August 2022, Stroll owned the Circuit Mont-Tremblant racing circuit, in Quebec's Laurentian Mountains.

In 2014, Stroll took ownership of the Prema Racing team in the light of his son Lance racing for the outfit in Formula 4 and the FIA Formula 3 European Championship. Stroll vetoed multiple driver moves in connection with Prema; he prevented George Russell from racing for the team in the 2014 Formula Renault 2.0 Alps Series and vetoed the move of Lando Norris to the team ahead of the 2018 Formula 2 season. The team was sold to Swiss company DC Racing Solutions, managed in part by Deborah Mayer and Claudio Schiavoni, in 2021.

In August 2018, Stroll led a consortium of investors in buying the assets of the defunct Force India Formula One team. Renamed Racing Point Force India, and as a new team officially, they re-entered midway through the 2018 Formula One season and achieved 7th position in the Constructors' Championship. For the 2019 season, the team name and entrant was changed once again to Racing Point F1 Team, with Stroll's son Lance driving one of the cars, finishing in 7th position in the Constructors' Championship once again.

On 31 January 2020, it was announced that Stroll led the Yew Tree Investments consortium to invest £182 million into Aston Martin, in return for a 16.7% stake in the company. Racing Point F1 Team was re-branded as the Aston Martin F1 Team in 2021.

== Personal life ==
Stroll is married to Raquel Stroll (née Diniz, not related to former Formula One driver Pedro Diniz). He was previously married to Belgian-born Claire-Anne Stroll (née Callens). Lawrence and Claire-Anne have two children: singer-songwriter Chloe Stroll, married since May 2023 to Australian snowboarder and Olympian Scotty James; and racing driver Lance Stroll, currently competing for Lawrence's Aston Martin F1 team.

Stroll has a large car collection mostly consisting of Ferraris, including a 1963 Ferrari 250 GTO, a 1958 Ferrari 250 Testa Rossa, and a 1967 Ferrari 330 P4. He used to own the Ferrari dealership of Quebec. He also owns other cars such as a 1996 McLaren F1 and a Ford GT.
