= Chloe Stroll =

Canadian singer-songwriter (born 1995)

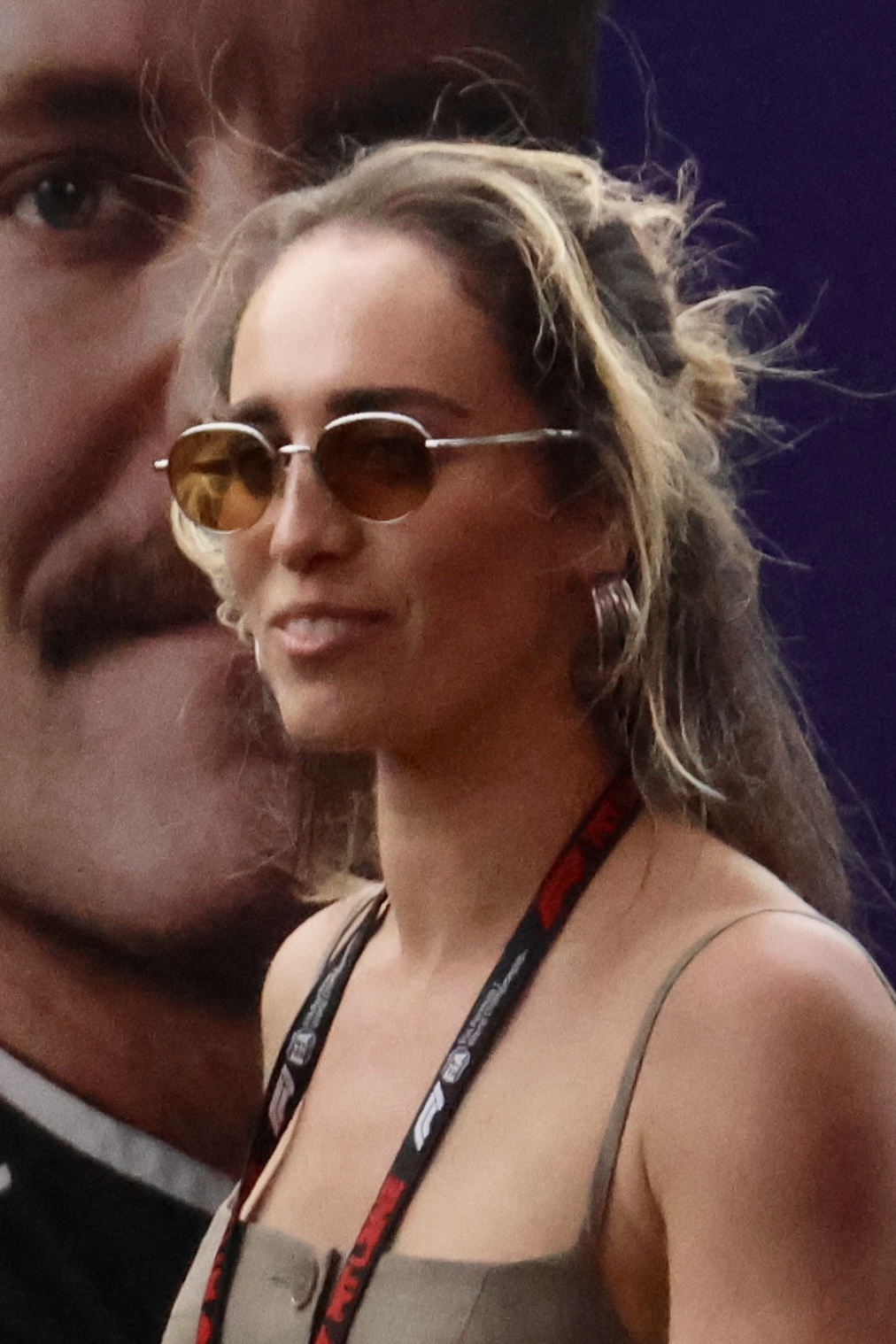
- Chloe Stroll at the Melbourne Walk during the 2026 Australian Grand Prix

Background information
- Born: Chloe Faith Strulovitch; April 11, 1995 (age 31); Montreal, Quebec, Canada
- Genres: Pop
- Occupations: Singer; songwriter
- Years active: 2012–present
- Spouse: Scotty James (m. 2023)
- Website: chloestrollofficial.com

Chloe Faith Strulovitch (born April 11, 1995), known professionally as Chloe Stroll, is a Canadian singer-songwriter.

== Personal life ==
Chloe Stroll was born in Montreal and grew up there. She claims to have written her first song when she was seven years old. She is the daughter of Canadian billionaire Lawrence Stroll who is part-owner and executive chairman of Aston Martin in addition to being the owner of the Aston Martin Formula One team. Her mother is Belgian fashion designer Claire-Anne Callens. She holds both Canadian and Belgian citizenship. She is the older sister of Aston Martin Formula 1 driver, Lance Stroll. She and professional snowboarder and Olympic athlete, Scotty James, who is from Victoria, Australia, married in May 2023. In October 2024, they announced the birth of their son, Leo Harry James.

== Career ==
Stroll released many singles during 2023 and 2024. "Run" debuted as her first single of 2023 on July 14 and a remix of the track by PINES, an electronic duo from Adelaide, Australia came out.

She then released five additional singles including "Pedestal", "Hurricane", "Homesick", a cover of Billie Eilish's "My Future", and "Dizzy". The songs marked a shift from her earlier single "Surrender" in 2012. She performed "Pedestal" on The Kelly Clarkson Show on February 13, 2024. Stroll performed "Dizzy" on Good Day New York on February 16, 2024. She had her UK performance debut on April 10, 2024. "Run", "Pedestal", and "Homesick" were featured on ET Online's "New Music Friday" round-up. Additionally, "Pedestal", "Hurricane", and "Homesick" were featured on Popdust.

== Discography ==
Singles

Year	Title	Peak chart positions	Album
Year	Title	US AC	Album
2012	"Surrender"	—	Non-album singles
2023	"Run"	—	Non-album singles
2023	"Pedestal"	—	Non-album singles
2023	"Hurricane"	—	Non-album singles
2023	"Homesick"	—	Non-album singles
2024	"Run" (Pines remix)	—	Non-album singles
2024	"My Future" (Billie Eilish cover)	—	Non-album singles
2024	"Dizzy"	—	Non-album singles
2024	"Extremes"	—	Non-album singles
2024	"Water Over Sand"	—	Non-album singles
2024	"Thin Air"	—	Non-album singles
2024	"Got It All"	—	Non-album singles
2025	"You're OK"	20	Non-album singles
