= Pat Burgener =

Swiss-Brazilian snowboarder (born 1994)

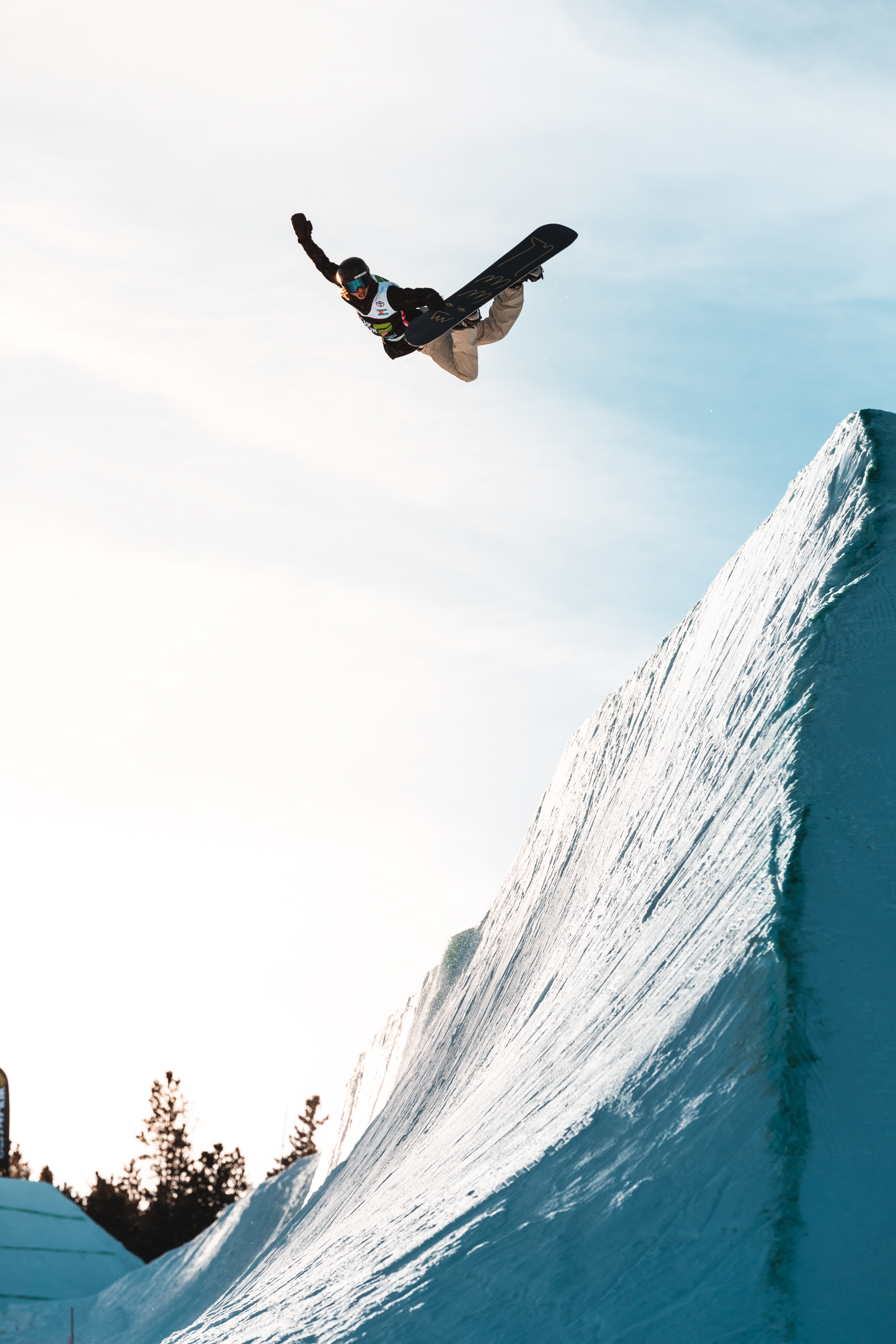
- Pat Burgener at the 2019 Dew Tour

Personal information
- Nationality: Swiss/Brazilian
- Born: 1 June 1994 (age 32) Lausanne, Switzerland
- Height: 1.80 m (5 ft 11 in)
- Website: www.patburgener.ch

Sport
- Country: Brazil (2025–present); Switzerland (2008–2025)
- Sport: Snowboarding
- Event: Halfpipe
- Club: AS Crans Montana and AS Montreux Glion Caux
- Coached by: Pepe Regazzi and Giacomo Kratter
Medal record
Men's snowboarding
Representing Brazil
FIS Snowboard World Cup
Bronze medal – third place	2026 Calgary	Halfpipe
Representing Switzerland
FIS Snowboard World Championships
Bronze medal – third place	2017 Sierra Nevada	Halfpipe
Bronze medal – third place	2019 Utah	Halfpipe
FIS Snowboard World Cup
Gold medal – first place	2016 Copper	Halfpipe
Silver medal – second place	2010 Kreischberg	Halfpipe
Silver medal – second place	2019 Mammoth	Halfpipe
Bronze medal – third place	2010 Valmalenco	Halfpipe
Bronze medal – third place	2010 Stockholm	Big Air
Bronze medal – third place	2011 Arosa	Halfpipe
Bronze medal – third place	2012 Antwerp	Big Air
Bronze medal – third place	2017 Cardrona	Halfpipe
Bronze medal – third place	2020 Calgary	Halfpipe

Patrick Burgener (born 1 June 1994) is a Swiss and Brazilian professional snowboarder, two-time Olympian and musician. He joined the Swiss national team at the age of 14 and landed the world’s first Switch Backside Triple Cork 1440 in April 2011. Burgener competed for Switzerland in the men's halfpipe at the 2018 Olympic Winter Games in PyeongChang where he finished 5th overall. He earned two bronze medals in the halfpipe events at the FIS Freestyle Ski and Snowboarding World Championships 2017 and again in 2019. Burgener was named to his second Swiss Olympic Snowboard Freestyle Team on 18 January 2022. He represented Switzerland in the men’s halfpipe at the 2022 Olympic Winter Games in Beijing where he qualified for the finals and placed 11th overall. His career results also include nine World Cup podiums, five European Cup podiums and seven Swiss Champion titles respectively in halfpipe and early on in big air.

In June 2025, Burgener announced that he would return to snowboarding representing Brazil at the start of the 2025/26 season. The change of nationality was made possible by the fact that Burgener's mother acquired Brazilian citizenship in her teenage years after fleeing from Lebanon as a child.

On 3 January 2026, Burgener finished third on men's halfpipe in Calgary, Canada, his tenth podium at FIS World Cup and latest since 2020. That result was a milestone for Brazil's Winter sports: It was the first podium of the South American nation at a freestyle skiing event on FIS Circuit.

== Early life ==
Burgener was born in Lausanne to a Swiss father and a Lebanese mother whose parents fled the Lebanese Civil war in the 1980s and found refuge in Brazil.

== Sports career ==
=== Snowboarding achievements ===
Below is a selection of Burgener's major career highlights.

==== Representing Switzerland ====
- 2009 Burton European Junior Open, Halfpipe, Laax, Switzerland – 1st
- 2009 Burton European Junior Open, Slopestyle, Laax, Switzerland – 1st
- 2010 FIS World Cup, Halfpipe, Kreischberg, Austria – 2nd
- 2010 FIS World Cup, Halfpipe, Valmalenco, Italy – 3rd
- 2010/11 Swiss Champion | Halfpipe, Zermatt, Switzerland
- 2010 FIS World Cup, Big Air, Stockholm, Sweden – 3rd
- 2011 FIS Snowboard World Championships, Halfpipe, La Molina, Spain – 6th
- 2011 Billabong Air & Style Rookie, Big Air, Innsbruck, Austria – 2nd
- 2011 Burn River Jump Slopestyle, Livigno, Italy – 2nd
- 2011 FIS World Cup Halfpipe Arosa, Italy – 3rd
- 2011/12 Swiss Champion | Free-Style (1st in Big Air + 2nd in Halfpipe), Zermatt, Switzerland
- 2011 Monster Energy Fridge Festival, Big Air, Budapest, Hungary – 1st
- 2012 Billabong Air & Style Innsbruck, Big Air, Austria – 5th
- 2012/13 Swiss Champion | Big Air, Zermatt, Switzerland
- 2012 Freestyle.ch, Big Air, Zurich, Switzerland – 3rd
- 2012 FIS World Cup, Big Air, Antwerp, Belgium – 3rd
- 2015 Russian Grand Prix, Big Air, Moscow, Russia – 4th
- 2015 Swiss Champion | Halfpipe, Corvatsch, Switzerland
- 2015 FIS European Cup, Halfpipe, Corvatsch, Switzerland – 1st
- 2015 U.S. Revolution Tour, Halfpipe, Copper Mountain, USA – 2nd
- 2016 LAAX OPEN, Halfpipe, Laax, Switzerland – 2nd
- 2016 U.S. Grand Prix, FIS World Cup, Park City, USA – 4th
- 2016 U.S. Revolution Tour, Halfpipe, Copper Mountain, USA – 2nd
- 2016 Toyota U.S. Grand Prix, FIS World Cup, Halfpipe, Copper Mountain, USA – 1st
- 2017 FIS Snowboard World Championships, Halfpipe, Sierra Nevada, Spain – 3rd
- 2017 Swiss Champion | Halfpipe, Laax, Switzerland
- 2017 FIS European Cup, Freestyle Champs, Halfpipe, Laax, Switzerland – 1st
- 2017 Winter Games NZ, FIS World Cup, Halfpipe, Cardrona, New Zealand – 3rd
- 2018 Olympic Winter Games, Halfpipe, PyeongChang, Republic of Korea – 5th
- 2018 Toyota U.S. Grand Prix, FIS World Cup, Halfpipe, Copper Mountain, USA – 4th
- 2018 Winter Dew Tour, Halfpipe, Breckenridge, USA – 4th
- 2019 FIS Snowboard World Championships, Halfpipe, Park City, USA – 3rd
- 2019 at Toyota U.S. Grand Prix, FIS World Cup, Halfpipe, Mammoth Mountain, USA – 2nd
- 2019 Swiss Champion | Halfpipe, Laax, Switzerland
- 2019 FIS European Cup, Freestyle Champs, Halfpipe, Laax, Switzerland – 2nd
- 2019 FIS World Cup, Halfpipe, Secret Garden, China – 5th
- 2020 Winter Dew Tour, Halfpipe, Copper Mountain, USA – 3rd
- 2020 Snow Rodeo, FIS World Cup, Halfpipe, Calgary, Canada – 3rd
- 2021 FIS European Cup, Halfpipe, Crans-Montana, Switzerland – 3rd
- 2022 LAAX OPEN, FIS World Cup, Halfpipe, Laax, Switzerland – 6th
- 2022 Olympic Winter Games, Halfpipe, Beijing, China – 11th
- 2022 Swiss Champion | Halfpipe, Laax, Switzerland
- 2022 FIS European Cup Premium, Halfpipe, Laax, Switzerland – 2nd

==== Representing Brazil ====
- 2026 Snow Rodeo, FIS World Cup, Halfpipe, Calgary, Canada – 3rd
- 2026 LAAX OPEN, FIS World Cup, Halfpipe, Laax, Switzerland – 6th
- 2026 Olympic Winter Games, Halfpipe, Milan and Cortina - Livigno, Italy – 14th

=== Records ===
- First man in the world to land the Switch Backside Triple Cork 1440 (2011)

== Music career ==
In addition to professional snowboarding, Burgener has been pursuing a parallel career in music since 2014. The singer-songwriter has released four EPs so far: The Route (2018), Icar (2019), Better Man (2020) and California Sun (2021). With over 4.4 million streams on Spotify, the song "Staring At The Sun" from the 2019 EP Icar remains Burgener's most listened-to track to date. His song "Allons Danser" ("How About A Dance") was commissioned as the 2020 Swiss Press Song for the 2020 Swiss Press Award. Burgener was named the SRF 3 Best Talent for August 2021, an award through which the Swiss Radio and Television honours up-and-coming music acts from Switzerland. His latest single "Work It Out" came out shortly before he competed in the 2022 Winter Olympics. Burgener has performed solo or with his band at various festivals and venues across Switzerland, including the Montreux Jazz Festival, Zermatt Unplugged, Sion sous les étoiles, Gurtenfestival, Caribana Festival, Kaufleuten and others. He has also performed in New York City and has been featured in Swiss Live Talents Showcases at Mondo.NYC, New York’s Annual Music, Arts & Technology Conference & Showcase Festival.

=== Extended plays ===
EP	Details	Writers	Producer(s)	Track listing
The Route	Released: 2 March 2018 Label: Universal Music GmbH Format: vinyl, digital	Pat Burgener Max Burgener Christian Schulz	John Agnello	Vinyl: 1. "Dreams"; 2. "Korea"; 3. "Brightest Fantasy"; 4. "Only One"; 5. "Lost Time"; 6. "Get Along"; 7. "Fading Out"; 8. "Drives Me Crazy"; Digital: 1. "Dreams"; 2. "Korea"; 3. "Brightest Fantasy"; 4. "Lost Time"; 5. "Get Along"; 6. "Fading Out"
Icar	Released: 23 August 2019 Label: Universal Music GmbH Format: digital	Pat Burgener Max Burgener Antoine Cotton Cameron Deyell Jasper Leak	Jasper Leak	1. "The Long Game"; 2. "Staring At The Sun"; 3. "Wrong To Be Right"; 4. "River"; 5. "Nothing Else"
Better Man	Released: 15 May 2020 Label: Pat Burgener Format: digital	Antoine Cotton Max Burgener Pat Burgener Jasper Leak ("Better Man")	Antoine Cotton Max Burgener ("Better Man", "Fired Up") Pat Burgener ("Better Man")	1. "Maybe Someday"; 2. "Fired Up"; 3. "Better Man"; 4. "Break Apart"; 5. "Devil"
California Sun	Released: 25 June 2021 Label: Pat Burgener Format: digital	Pat Burgener Max Burgener Jordan Topf Antoine Cotton Chris Chu	Tom Fuller Chris Chu (“Make It Home”)	1. "California Sun"; 2. "Out of Hand"; 3. "Make It Home"; 4. "Dollar"

=== Selected singles ===
==== "Work It Out" ====
Burgener's first single of 2022, "Work It Out", was released on 28 January 2022, one week before the start of the 2022 Winter Olympics in Beijing, where he was set to compete in the men's halfpipe. "I really wanted to release the song now because it's part of my Olympic story," as Pat explained, and to draw on it as a source of motivation and positive energy before the competition. He wrote this song with his brother, Max Burgener, during his healing period after a knee injury in a snowboarding accident in spring 2021. The song's message is that difficult situations – whether in relationships or in daily life – can be overcome with a positive attitude and a smile. "Work It Out" was featured on Swiss German-language Radio SRF 3 as the song of the day on 3 February 2022. "Work It Out" is the first song of Burgener's forthcoming first album to be released in the latter part of 2022. He also directed and edited the official music video that was filmed by John Osterman on a Malibu beach in California. In April 2022, Burgener released an acoustic version of this song and a new YouTube video, this time recorded and filmed in Lausanne, Switzerland.

==== "Low" ====
“Low” is the second single of Burgener's forthcoming debut album. He co-wrote the song with his brother Max and released it on 13 May 2022. The single was produced by Tom Fuller. This is not their first collaboration – Tom Fuller also produced Burgener's fourth EP California Sun (2021), and the single “Work It Out”, Burgener's personal anthem for his 2022 Olympic snowboard odyssey. Burgener shot the official music video accompanying the release of "Low" during the 2022 Winter Olympics in China, where he competed for Switzerland in the men’s snowboard halfpipe. The music video is titled "Low: A Journey at the Beijing Olympic Games", and Pat directed and edited it by himself. Taking the viewers behind the scenes of Burgener's Olympics experience at Beijing 2022, the video includes footage from his arrival at Beijing airport, the Olympic Village, and Olympic competition sites, as well as an excerpt from the RTS Swiss TV programme “Au coeur des Jeux” which featured him on 7 February 2022, in an episode called “JO, Made in China: Pat Burgener”.

== Personal life ==
Burgener's first language is French, and he also speaks English and Swiss German fluently. His mother and grandparents found refuge in Brazil during the Lebanese Civil War in the 1980s.
