= Ryusei Yamada =

Japanese snowboarder (born 2006)

Personal information
- Born: 25 March 2006 (age 20) Hokkaido, Japan

Sport
- Country: Japan
- Sport: Snowboarding
- Event: Halfpipe
Medal record
Men's snowboarding
Representing Japan
Olympic Games
Bronze medal – third place	2026 Milano Cortina	Halfpipe
Winter Youth Olympics
Bronze medal – third place	2024 Gangwon	Halfpipe

Ryusei Yamada (山田琉聖, Yamada Ryusei; born 25 March 2006) is a Japanese snowboarder.

== Career ==
In January 2024, Yamada represented Japan at the 2024 Winter Youth Olympics and won a bronze medal in the halfpipe event with a score of 83.00.

During the 2024–25 FIS Snowboard World Cup he earned his first podium finish on 8 December 2024, finishing in third with a score of 87.75. During the 2025–26 FIS Snowboard World Cup he won the halfpipe event with a score of 94.50 on 19 December 2025, his first World Cup win.

He represented Japan at the 2026 Winter Olympics and won a bronze medal in the halfpipe event with a score of 92.00.
