= Snow Australia =

Sports governing body in Australia

- Sport: Alpine skiing, Nordic skiing, freestyle skiing and snowboarding, Para-alpine skiing, Para-snowboarding
- Jurisdiction: Australia
- Affiliation: International Ski and Snowboard Federation (FIS)
- Headquarters: South Melbourne, Australia

Official website
- www.snow.org.au
- (Australia)

Snow Australia is the national governing body for the sports of Alpine skiing, Nordic skiing, Freestyle skiing, Snowboarding, Para-alpine and Para-snowboard in Australia.

The name of the organisation was changed from Ski & Snowboard Australia in 2019, coinciding with the unification of the sport in Australia.

It has the overarching responsibility for the entire national athlete pathway, from entry level through to elite, across all disciplines. To meet this responsibility, Snow Australia engages with many different organisations including ski resorts, Federal & State Governments, State Sporting Organisations, Clubs, sporting institutes and industry peak bodies.
