= Campbell Melville Ives =

New Zealand snowboarder (born 2006)

Personal information
- Born: 6 July 2006 (age 19) Dunedin, New Zealand
- Relative: Finley Melville Ives (brother)

Sport
- Country: New Zealand
- Sport: Snowboarding
- Event: Halfpipe
Medal record
Men's snowboarding
Representing New Zealand
Winter Youth Olympics
Bronze medal – third place	2024 Gangwon	Big air

Campbell Melville Ives (born 6 July 2006) is a New Zealand snowboarder.

== Early life ==
Melville Ives was born in Dunedin and raised in Wānaka, where he was educated at Mount Aspiring College. His twin brother, Finley, is a freestyle skier.

== Career ==
Melville Ives competed at the 2022 FIS Snowboarding Junior World Championships and won a silver medal in the slopestyle event.

He represented New Zealand at the 2024 Winter Youth Olympics and won a bronze medal in the big air event with a score of 153.00. He also finished in fourth place in both the halfpipe and slopestyle events. In March 2025, he competed at the 2025 FIS Snowboarding World Championships and finished in fifth place in the halfpipe event with a score of 80.25.

On 30 October 2025, he was conditionally selected to represent New Zealand at the 2026 Winter Olympics. During the 2025–26 FIS Snowboard World Cup, he earned his first career World Cup podium on 17 January 2026, finishing in second place. He became the first athlete in halfpipe history to land two triple corks in a completed competition run.
