= Lorenzo Gennero =

Italian snowboarder (born 1997)

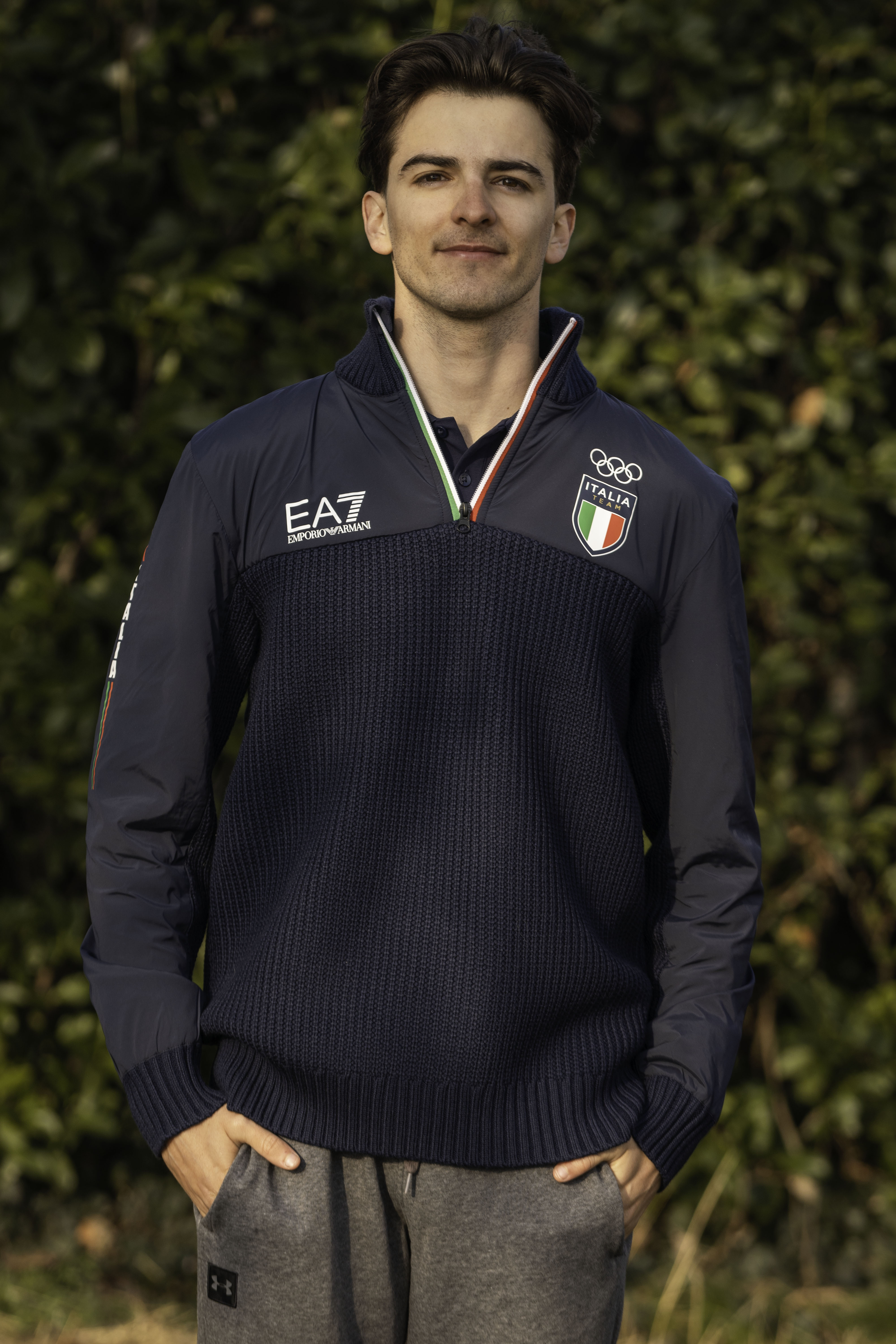

Personal information
- Born: 30 June 1997 (age 28) Turin, Italy
- Height: 183
- Weight: 68

Sport
- Country: Italy
- Sport: Snowboarding
- Event: Halfpipe/Big air
- Club: Garage Camp

Lorenzo Gennero (born 30 June 1997) is an Italian snowboarder who competed in the men's halfpipe event at the 2022 Winter Olympics. Gennero had finished twenty fifth in the halfpipe event at the Aspen 2021 World Championships. In 2019 he won the Halfpipe Europa Cup in Crans Montana.
