= Sergey Tarasov (snowboarder) =

Russian snowboarder

Personal information
- Born: 5 September 1988 (age 37) St. Petersburg, Russian SSR, Soviet Union

Sport
- Sport: Skiing

Sergey Tarasov (born 5 September 1988 in St. Petersburg) is a Russian snowboarder, specializing in the halfpipe.

Tarasov competed at the 2014 Winter Olympics for Russia. He placed 36th in the qualifying round of the halfpipe, not advancing.

As of September 2014, his best showing at the World Championships is 17th, in the 2009 big air event.

Tarasov made his World Cup debut in January 2005. As of September 2014, his best finish is 8th, in a pair of halfpipe events. His best overall finish is 19th, in 2011–12.
