= Alessandro Barbieri (snowboarder) =

American snowboarder (born 2008)

Personal information
- Nickname: Alè
- Born: October 5, 2008 (age 17) Portland, Oregon, U.S.

Sport
- Country: United States
- Sport: Snowboarding
Medal record
Men's snowboarding
Representing the United States
Winter Youth Olympics
Silver medal – second place	2024 Gangwon	Halfpipe

Alessandro Barbieri (born October 5, 2008) is an American snowboarder.

== Career ==
Barbieri represented the United States at the 2024 Winter Youth Olympics and won a silver medal in the halfpipe event with a score of 84.75.

During the final halfpipe event of the 2024–25 FIS Snowboard World Cup he earned his first career World Cup podium on February 21, 2025, finishing in third place. During the 2025–26 Snow League he became the first American, and youngest rider ever, to land a triple cork 1440 in competition.

During the 2025–26 FIS Snowboard World Cup he earned his second career World Cup podium on January 9, 2026, again finishing in third place. He was selected to represent the United States at the 2026 Winter Olympics. During the halfpipe qualification he ranked fourth with a score of 88.50 and advanced to the finals.
