= Chaeun Lee =

South Korean snowboarder (born 2006)

Personal information
- Native name: 이채운
- Nationality: South Korean
- Born: 11 April 2006 (age 20) Hwaseong, South Korea
- Height: 1.73 m (5 ft 8 in)
- Weight: 63 kg (139 lb)

Sport
- Country: South Korea
- Sport: Snowboarding
- Event: Halfpipe
Medal record
Men's snowboarding
Representing South Korea
World Championships
Gold medal – first place	2023 Bakuriani	Halfpipe
Asian Winter Games
Gold medal – first place	2025 Harbin	Slopestyle
Winter Youth Olympics
Gold medal – first place	2024 Gangwon	Halfpipe
Gold medal – first place	2024 Gangwon	Slopestyle
Junior World Championships
Gold medal – first place	2022 Leysin	Halfpipe
Bronze medal – third place	2021 Krasnoyarsk	Halfpipe
Bronze medal – third place	2022 Leysin	Big Air

Chaeun Lee (Korean: 이채운; born April 11, 2006), also credited in eastern name order as Lee Chaeun or Lee Chae-un, is a South Korean snowboarder. He won a gold medal at the FIS Freestyle Ski and Snowboarding World Championships 2023 in the halfpipe.

== Career ==
Lee competed in the men's halfpipe in the 2022 Beijing Winter Olympics at just 15 years old, making him the youngest male athlete at the Beijing Games.

In 2023, Lee won the gold medal in the halfpipe at the FIS Freestyle Ski and Snowboarding World Championships 2023 in Bakuriani, Georgia. The 16-year-old was the first South Korean to win a gold medal in any skiing or snowboarding discipline and also the youngest male snowboard gold medalist in world championship history.

At the 2024 Winter Youth Olympics in Gangwon Province, South Korea, Lee grabbed two gold medals in snowboard men's slopestyle and halfpipe. He became the first South Korean to win a gold medal in snowboarding at any Winter Olympic competition.

Lee took men's snowboard slopestyle gold at the Harbin 2025 Asian Winter Games. Lee scored 90.00 points with a backside triple cork 1440 on his third run to claim gold in the men's snowboard slopestyle final.

Lee finished sixth with 87.50 points in the men's halfpipe at the 2026 Milan-Cortina Winter Olympics. He failed to complete his first two runs but flawlessly executed the frontside triple cork 1620—a technique involving three inverted flips and four-and-a-half rotations while jumping forward. At that moment, he became the first in the world to perform it. While double cork 1620s had been done before, the triple cork 1620 was uncharted territory.
