= Liam Gill (snowboarder) =

Canadian snowboarder (born 2003)

Liam Gill OLY
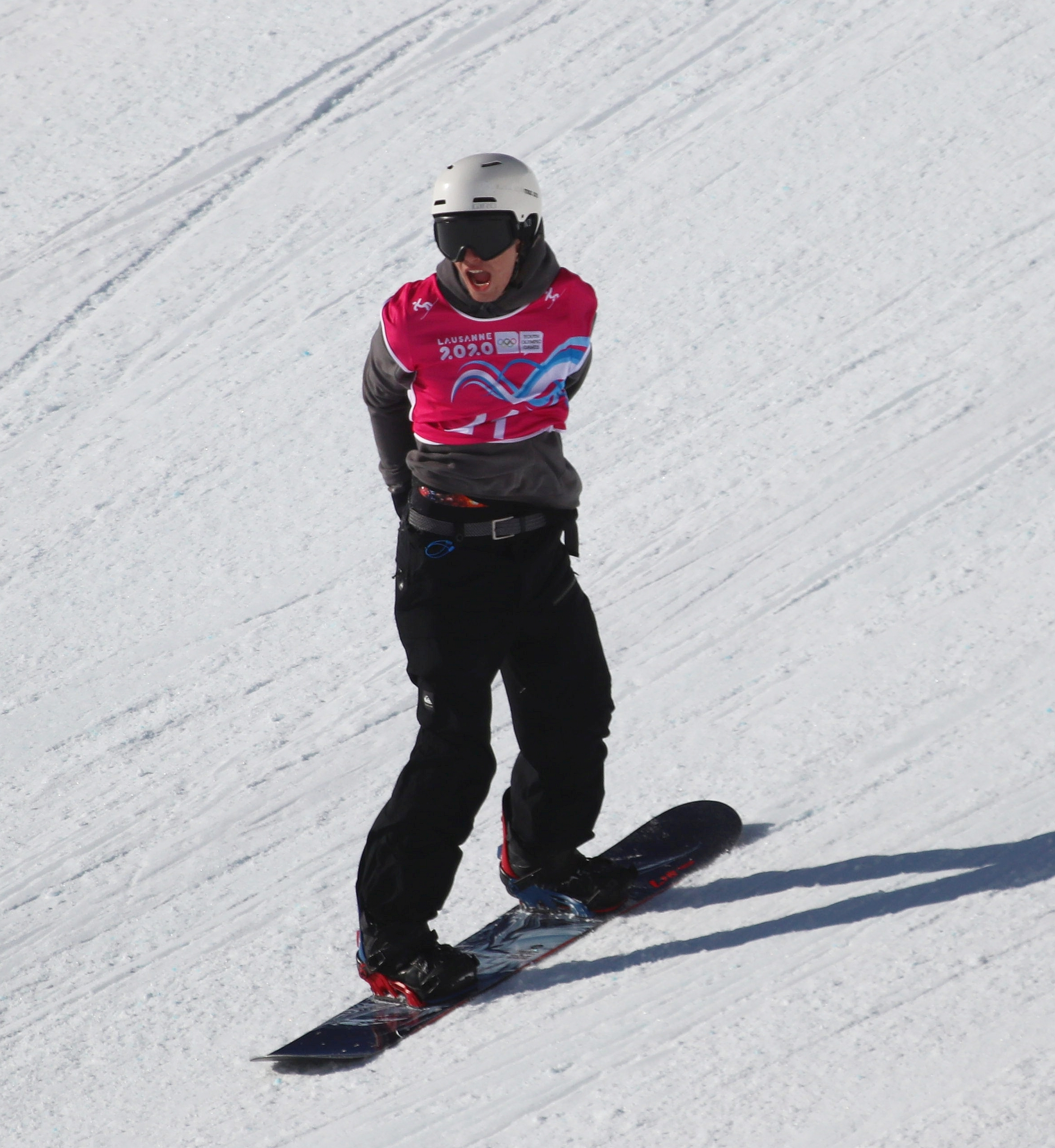
- Gill at the 2020 Winter Youth Olympics

Personal information
- Born: 30 July 2003 (age 22) Calgary, Alberta, Canada
- Height: 180 cm (5 ft 11 in)

Sport
- Country: Canada
- Sport: Snowboarding
- Event: Half-pipe

Liam Gill (born 30 July 2003) is a Canadian snowboarder who competes internationally in the half-pipe discipline.

== Career ==
Gill first represented Canada at the 2020 Winter Youth Olympics, where he competed in three events: slopestyle (11th), halfpipe (13th) and big air (8th).

On January 31, 2022, Gill was named to Canada's 2022 Olympic team in the halfpipe event as an injury replacement for Derek Livingston.

Gill is a part of the Łı́ı́dlı̨ı̨ Kų́ę́ First Nation and was the only male First Nations athlete from Canada at the 2022 Winter Olympics.
