= Lucas Foster (snowboarder) =

American snowboarder (born 1999)

Lucas Foster (born September 17, 1999) is an American snowboarder from Telluride, Colorado. Born to Stephannie Van Damme and Steve Foster He competed at the 2022 Winter Olympics.
