= Kim Geon-hui =

South Korean footballer (born 2002)

Personal information
- Date of birth: 16 September 2002 (age 24)
- Place of birth: Gwangju, South Korea
- Height: 1.92 m (6 ft 4 in)
- Position: Centre-back

Team information
- Current team: Incheon United
- Number: 4

Youth career
- 2018–2020: Jungkyung High School

Senior career*
Years	Team	Apps	(Gls)
2023–	Incheon United	101	(3)

International career^{‡}
2026–	South Korea	0	(0)
- * Club domestic league appearances and goals as of 8 November 2026 ‡ National team caps and goals as of 14 September 2026

- Kim Geon-hui
- Hangul: 김건희
- Hanja: 金建熙
- RR: Gim Geonhui
- MR: Kim Kŏnhŭi
- IPA: [kim.ɡʌn.ɦi]

Kim Geon-hui (Korean: 김건희; born 16 September 2002) is a South Korean professional footballer who plays as a centre-back for Incheon United and the South Korea national team.

== Club career ==
In 2023, Kim Geon-hui signed a professional contract with Incheon United.

Kim Geon-hui made her professional debut at the Korea Cup on May 24, 2023.

== International career ==
On 14 September 2026, He was called up to the South Korea national football team for the first time and participated friendly matches in September and October 2026.

== Career statistics ==
=== Club ===
As of match played 8 November 2026

Appearances and goals by club, season and competition
Club	Season	League			Cup		Continental		Other		Total	
Club	Season	Division	Apps	Goals	Apps	Goals	Apps	Goals	Apps	Goals	Apps	Goals
Incheon United	2023	K League 1	9	0	2	0	—		—		11	0
Incheon United	2024	K League 1	28	0	2	0	3 (Note: Appearances in AFC Champions League Elite)	0	—		33	0
Incheon United	2025	K League 2	39	1	0	0	—		—		39	1
Incheon United	2026	K League 1	25	2	0	0	—		—		25	2
Career total			101	3	4	0	3	0	0	0	108	3

== Honours ==
Incheon United

- K League 2: 2025

Individual

- K League 2 Best XI: 2025
