= Arthur Longo =

French snowboarder (born 1988)

Arthur Longo (born 21 July 1988) is a French snowboarder. He competed at the 2014 Winter Olympics in Sochi.
