= Wang Ziyang =

Chinese snowboarder (born 2003)

Personal information
- Nationality: Chinese
- Born: 3 April 2003 (age 23) Ürümqi, China

Sport
- Country: China
- Sport: Snowboarding
- Event(s): Halfpipe; Big Air; Knuckle huck
Medal record
Men's snowboarding
Representing China
Winter X Games
Gold medal – first place	2025 Aspen	Knuckle Huck

Wang Ziyang (Chinese: 王梓阳; born 1 April 2003) is a Chinese professional snowboarder who specializes in the halfpipe, knuckle huck and big air events.

== Career ==
Wang Ziyang is from Ürümqi, Xinjiang of western China and started snowboarding at the age of four. In 2017, he became the Chinese runner-up in slopestyle and big air.

At the age of 14, Wang competed in his first FIS event in Cardrona. A year later, he finished sixth in the halfpipe at the Junior World Championships at the same venue. On 8 December 2018, as the reigning Chinese halfpipe champion, he made his Snowboard World Cup debut in Copper Mountain. After finishing eighth at the Junior World Championships in Leysin, he had to settle for 22nd place in the halfpipe at his first World Championships in Park City. Following successes in the Australia New Zealand Cup, he initially struggled to achieve top rankings in the World Cup. After a COVID-related competition hiatus, he participated in the 2022 Winter Olympics, finishing 21st in his signature event. In the winter of 2023–24, after top results in Secret Garden and Laax, he finished among the top ten in the Halfpipe World Cup for the first time.

During preseason training in November 2024, Wang landed a Triple Cork 1620 and was subsequently invited to the X Games in Aspen for the first time. There, the rookie, influenced by Shaolin Kung Fu and other Chinese martial arts, won the gold medal in the Knuckle Huck with a triple front flip and a brief ground contact with his board. He thus became the first Chinese snowboard X Games champion. He also finished sixth in the Superpipe. Three weeks later, he competed in the Asian Winter Games in Harbin and qualified for the halfpipe final. In his preliminary run, he crashed in difficult weather conditions and had to be taken away with a suspected torn anterior cruciate ligament (ACL) in his left knee.
