= André Höflich =

German snowboarder (born 1997)

André Höflich (born 28 April 1997) is a German snowboarder. He competed in the halfpipe event at the 2022 Winter Olympics, finishing 8th.
