= Dolf van der Wal =

Dutch snowboarder

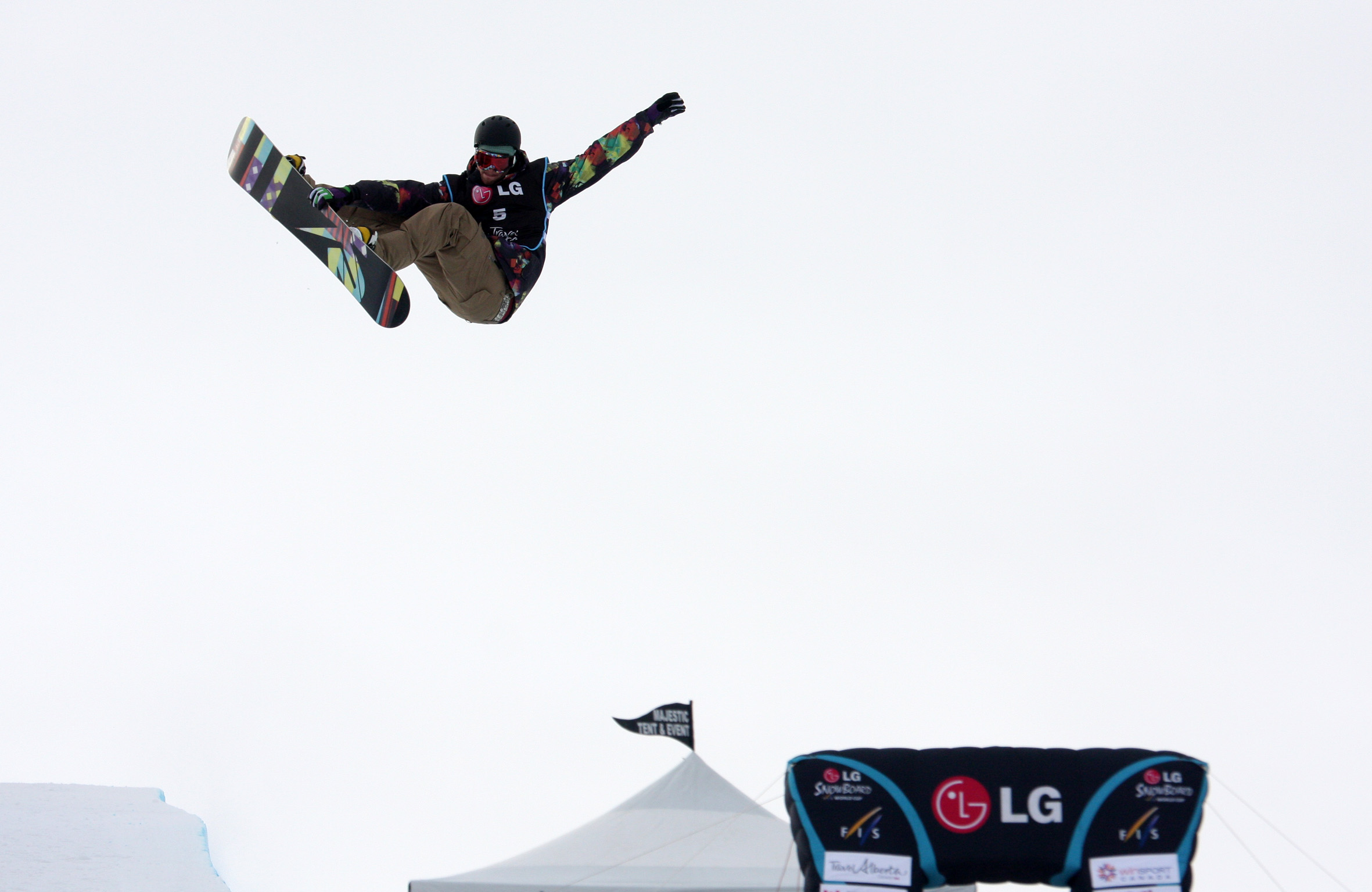
van der Wal at the FIS Snowboard World Cup

Dolf van der Wal (born 21 July 1987 in Huizen) is a Dutch snowboarder. He competed at the 2014 Winter Olympics in Sochi.

He is the younger brother of the late comedian Floor van der Wal.
