= Johann Baisamy =

French snowboarder (born 1989)

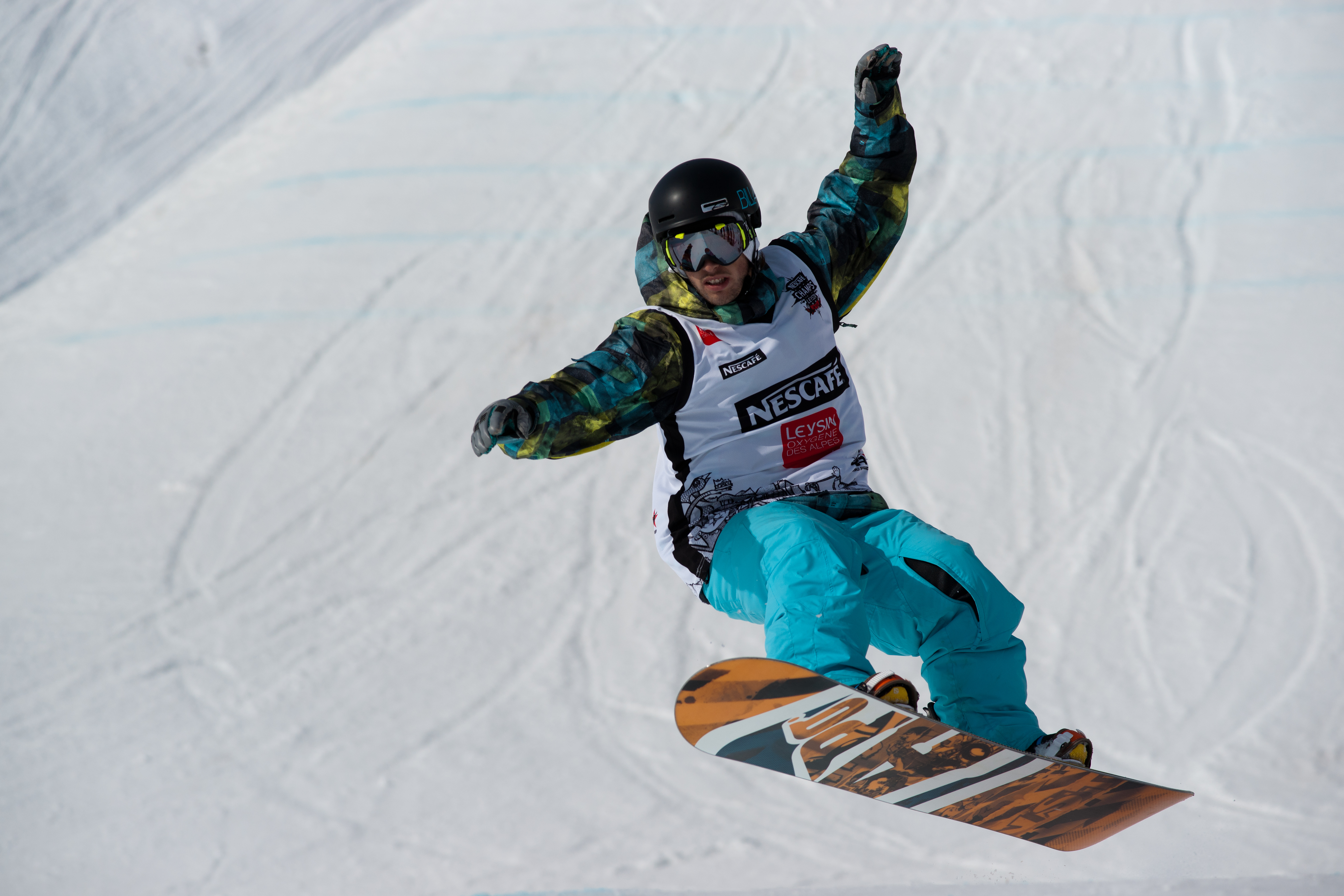
Johann Baisamy

Johann Baisamy (born 18 May 1989) is a French snowboarder. He has competed at the 2014 Winter Olympics in Sochi.
