= Ayumu Hirano =

Japanese snowboarder (born 1998)

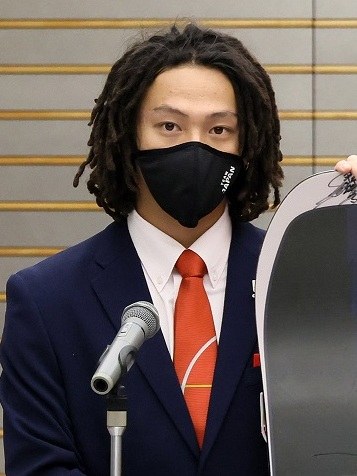
- Hirano in 2022

Personal information
- Born: 29 November 1998 (age 27) Murakami, Niigata
- Height: 1.65 m (5 ft 5 in)
- Weight: 50 kg (110 lb)

Sport
- Country: Japan
- Sport: Snowboarding
- Coached by: Elijah Teter, Ben Boyd
Medal record
Men's snowboarding
Representing Japan
Olympic Games
Gold medal – first place	2022 Beijing	Halfpipe
Silver medal – second place	2014 Sochi	Halfpipe
Silver medal – second place	2018 Pyeongchang	Halfpipe
Winter X Games
Gold medal – first place	2016 Oslo	SuperPipe
Gold medal – first place	2018 Aspen	SuperPipe
Silver medal – second place	2013 Aspen	SuperPipe
Silver medal – second place	2022 Aspen	SuperPipe
Burton Global Open Series
Gold medal – first place	2018 US Open	HalfPipe
Silver medal – second place	2013 US Open	HalfPipe
Bronze medal – third place	2015 US Open	HalfPipe
Gold medal – first place	2013 European Open	HalfPipe
Silver medal – second place	2015 European Open	HalfPipe
FIS Snowboard World Cup
Gold medal – first place	2021-22 Global	Halfpipe
Laax Open
Gold medal – first place	2022 Laax	HalfPipe

Ayumu Hirano (平野 歩夢, Hirano Ayumu; born 29 November 1998) is a Japanese Olympic champion and three-time Olympic medalist snowboarder and Olympic skateboarder. He won the silver medal in the superpipe in 2013 Winter X Games XVII at the age of 14, becoming the youngest medalist in X Games history, and won silver medals in the half-pipe at both the 2014 Winter Olympics in Sochi and the 2018 Winter Olympics in Pyeongchang and the gold medal at the 2022 Winter Olympics in Beijing. He also competed at the 2020 Summer Olympics in Tokyo as a skateboarder, becoming one of the two athletes, the other being Jaqueline Mourão, who participated in all of the three consecutive Olympic Games in East Asia between 2018 and 2022.

== Early life ==
Ayumu Hirano was born and raised in the small coastal city of Murakami in Niigata Prefecture, situated in an area of heavy snowfall in Japan. His mother named him Ayumu (歩夢), which means 'walk the dream' (歩 'walk', 夢 'dream'), wishing him to become a person who would know the joy of pursuing a dream and the perseverance to make it come true. His father, Hidenori, was a surfer who eventually opened a surf shop and later made a skate park (Nihonkai Skate Park) from scratch in his hometown of Murakami. The father originally hoped for his son, Ayumu, to become a surfer, but the son did not like it much. Instead, he got absorbed in skateboarding, following in the footsteps of his three-year-older brother, Eiju. He started skateboarding at the age of four and then snowboarding half a year later. He said he did not even remember how he started as he was too young, and it came naturally to him. He belonged to the skateboarding team e-Yume Kids 'great dream kids' at Nihonkai Skate Park and joined skateboarding competitions. As there was not a halfpipe near their hometown, Hirano's father often had to drive him to Yokone ski resort in Yamagata Prefecture, where the first official permanent halfpipe in Japan was located. However, it is 4 m (13 ft) narrower than the world standard halfpipe. Burton has sponsored Hirano since he was a fourth-grader.

== Career ==
Hirano's first big international snowboarding success was in March 2011, when he won the Burton US Junior Open. At the age of 12, the sixth-grader was not officially allowed to enter the open division of the event, where his mentor Kazuhiro Kokubo would win gold, and his brother Eiju would take seventh place. However, he dropped into the pipe between rounds as a "poacher" and amazed the audience. In 2012, he was invited to the Burton High Fives, an open event held in New Zealand to win the gold at the age of 13. In 2013, he was invited to compete in the Winter X Games in Aspen, Colorado, snowboarding's biggest non-Olympic stage, where he won silver in the halfpipe behind Shaun White, who explained: "The Japanese rider who got second is 14 years old. It's amazing!" He continued with a first place at the Burton European Open, a second place at the Burton US Open (also behind Shaun White), and a third place at the Oakley Arctic Challenge, becoming the 2012/2013 Halfpipe World Tour Champion. With this, he became the youngest rider to achieve this title. In the 2014 Winter Olympics at Sochi, he won the silver, behind Switzerland's Iouri Podladtchikov.

In 2018, Hirano became the first Japanese snowboarder who won at Winter X Games Aspen after landing the first-ever back-to-back double cork 1440s in Halfpipe history.

Hirano again took the silver in the half pipe at the 2018 Winter Olympics in PyeongChang, with Shaun White of the U.S. taking the gold and Scotty James of Australia garnering the bronze.

Hirano competed in Men's Park Skateboarding at the 2020 Tokyo Olympics, placing 14th.

Hirano landed the first triple cork in halfpipe competition history at the 2021 Dew Tour at Copper Mountain.

Hirano won the halfpipe event at the 2022 Winter Olympics in Beijing after outrage sparked by controversial judging of his successful second run, where he only scored a 91 in an unprecedented performance that included landing a triple cork which had never been landed in Olympic competition; Hirano then repeated his exceptional performance in the third run, successfully landing the "too dangerous" triple cork again under greater public scrutiny of the judges, and winning the gold medal. Hirano became the first athlete to win gold for Japan in snowboarding at the Winter Olympics, as well as the first Japanese athlete to win Olympic medals for three winter games in a row.

== Influences ==
Hirano's mentor, other than his parents, is Kazuhiro Kokubo, a Japanese two-time US Open winner in the halfpipe. Hirano said in an interview in 2013 with a Japanese magazine, Transworld Snowboarding Japan, "The environment has dramatically changed after I first went to the US. I met Kazu (Kokubo) and Carl (Harris), and it made it possible for me to join Mt. Hood summer camp and to compete in New Zealand. It gave me the experience in different pipes, and I got to see the leading riders ride. I came to understand what world-class means and knew what I needed to improve." Kokubo has been mentoring Hirano since 2011 and was assigned as the official technical coach for the Japanese national snowboarder team in 2013 by the Ski Association of Japan to support them in the 2012–2013 season.

Among Hirano's other coaches are Ben Boyd and Elijah Teter at Ski & Snowboard Club Vail.

Hirano's father has had the motto of "Personality comes first. The most essential is the most important" throughout his parenting and running his kids' skateboarding team.

== Personal life ==
Ayumu's brother, Kaishu Hirano, is also a snowboarder.
