= Liam Tourki =

French snowboarder (born 1999)

Personal information
- Nationality: French
- Born: 25 March 1999 (age 26); Grenoble, France

Sport
- Country: France
- Sport: Snowboarding
- Event: Halfpipe
- Club: Club des 7 Laux

Liam Tourki (born 25 March 1999) is a French snowboarder who competed in the men's halfpipe at the 2022 Winter Olympics. Tourki has two top-20 finishes at two World Championships (2019, 2021). He currently resides in Doussard.
