= Augustinho Teixeira =

Brazilian snowboarder (born 2005)

Personal information
- Born: 1 March 2005 (age 21) Ushuaia, Argentina

Sport
- Country: Brazil
- Sport: Snowboarding

Augustinho Teixeira , born 1 March 2005, in Ushuaia, Argentina is a snowboarder from Brazil. Teixeira grew up in Brazil. Later, his family moved with him to Canada to further his athletic career. He made his international competition debut on 11 September 2018, at a FIS competition in Corralco, Chile. Initially, he competed in Big Air and Slopestyle, but from 2022 onward, he increasingly focused on the halfpipe.

Teixeira competed in his first major international event in March 2021 at the FIS Snowboarding World Championships in Aspen, Colorado. His best result there was 24th place in the halfpipe.

On 11 December 2021, Teixeira made his World Cup debut at the World Cup in Copper Mountain, Colorado, where he finished 30th .

Teixeira's best World Cup result to date was 15th place in Calgary on 21 February 2025.

On 2 April 2025, Teixeira won his first competition at the continental level in Kitzsteinhorn, Austria.

He participated at the 2026 Olympic Winter Games in Milano Cortina. In the men's halfpipe, he finished in 19th place.
