= Kim Ho-jun (snowboarder) =

South Korean snowboarder (born 1990)

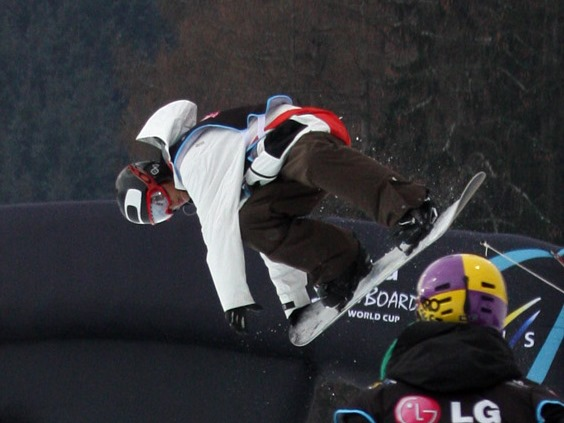
- FIS Snowboard World Cup 2009-10

Korean name
- Hangul: 김호준
- RR: Gim Hojun
- MR: Kim Hojun

Kim Ho-jun (born 1 May 1990) is a South Korean snowboarder. He was a participant at the 2014 Winter Olympics in Sochi.
