= Taku Hiraoka =

Japanese snowboarder (born 1995)

Personal information
- Born: October 29, 1995 (age 30) Gose, Nara
- Height: 171 cm (5 ft 7 in)
- Weight: 63 kg (139 lb)

Sport
- Country: Japan
- Sport: Snowboarding
Medal record
Men's snowboarding
Representing Japan
Olympic Games
Bronze medal – third place	2014 Sochi	Halfpipe
FIS Snowboarding World Championships
Silver medal – second place	2013 Stoneham	Halfpipe
Winter X Games
Silver medal – second place	2015 Aspen	Superpipe
Winter Youth Olympic Games
Bronze medal – third place	2012 Innsbruck	Halfpipe
New Zealand Winter Games
Silver medal – second place	2013 Cardrona	Halfpipe

Taku Hiraoka (平岡 卓, Hiraoka Taku; born 29 October 1995) is a Japanese snowboarder, from Gose, Nara.

He won silver in the halfpipe at the 2013 FIS Snowboarding World Championships. In the 2014 Winter Olympics, he won a bronze in the halfpipe. Later in 2014, he came in second behind American Taylor Gold in the Red Bull Double Pipe.

At the 2015 Winter X Games held in Aspen, Colorado Hiraoka won the silver medal in the Superpipe in finishing second behind American snowboarder Danny Davis' Gold medal effort.

On October 27, 2020, Hiraoka was found guilty and given a 30-month suspended prison sentence in a hit and run case that occurred the previous year and had injured six people. Hiraoka had been driving under the influence of alcohol and fled the scene after the accident.
