= Jan Scherrer =

Swiss snowboarder (born 1994)

- Scherrer in 2011

Personal information
- Nationality: Swiss
- Born: 11 July 1994 (age 32) Wildhaus, Switzerland
- Height: 1.82 m (6 ft 0 in)
- Weight: 70 kg (154 lb)

Sport
- Country: Switzerland
- Sport: Snowboarding
- Event: Halfpipe
- Club: SC Davos
Medal record
Men's snowboarding
Representing Switzerland
Olympic Games
| Bronze medal – third place | 2022 Beijing | Halfpipe |
World Championships
| Bronze medal – third place | 2021 Aspen | Halfpipe |
| Bronze medal – third place | 2023 Bakuriani | Halfpipe |
Winter X Games
| Silver medal – second place | 2023 Aspen | SuperPipe |
| Bronze medal – third place | 2020 Aspen | SuperPipe |

Jan Scherrer (born 11 July 1994) is a Swiss snowboarder. He is a three-time Olympian, representing Switzerland at the 2014 Winter Olympics in Sochi, the 2018 Winter Olympics in Pyongchang and the 2022 Winter Olympics in Beijing. He placed third to win the bronze medal at the 2022 Beijing Winter Olympics.

== Career ==
Scherrer was born in Wildhaus-Alt St. Johann, Switzerland. He began snowboarding at age 7 in 2001 and began competing in the 2002-2003 season.

In his first Olympic showing at the 2014 Sochi Olympics, Scherrer finished the qualification in 9th place of the 2nd heat, qualifying him to the semifinal. However, he suffered a right ankle injury and pulled out of the semifinal, and thus did not compete in the final.

At the 2018 Pyongchang Olympics, finished the qualifier in 6th place with a score of 84.00, and finished in 9th place with a score of 80.50 in the final.

In Scherrer's third Olympic appearance at the 2022 Beijing Olympics, he claimed the bronze medal with a final score of 87.25.

Scherrer also landed podium finishes in major competitions including a silver and bronze medal in the superpipe at the 2023 and 2020 X Games in Aspen, Colorado, respectively. He also secured a bronze medal in the halfpipe at the 2021 and 2023 World Championships in Aspen, Colorado, and Bakuriani, Georgia.

== Personal life ==
Scherrer has a wife, named Sasha, and a daughter, named Sienna, who was born in May 2022. Scherrer, who had not won a medal in any of his previous Olympic showings, agreed that if he were to win a medal at the 2022 Olympics, he would get a tattoo of his wife's choosing, a bet that he lost with his bronze medal win in the competition. He followed through with the bet in October of that year, getting a tattoo drawn by his wife.
