= Johannes Höpfl =

German snowboarder (born 1995)

Johannes Höpfl (born 12 August 1995) is a German snowboarder. He was a participant at the 2014 Winter Olympics in Sochi and the 2018 Winter Olympics in Pyongchang.
