= Raibu Katayama =

Japanese snowboarder (born 1995)

Personal information
- Nationality: Japanese
- Born: 4 May 1995 (age 30)
- Height: 1.64 m (5 ft 5 in)

Sport
- Sport: Snowboarding
- Event: Halfpipe

Raibu Katayama (片山 來夢, Katayama Raibu; born 4 May 1995) is a Japanese snowboarder who competed in the men's halfpipe at the 2018 Winter Olympics. He finished 7th overall.
