= Lee Kwang-ki =

South Korean snowboarder (born 1993)

- Hangul: 이광기
- Hanja: 李光基
- RR: I Gwanggi
- MR: I Kwanggi

Lee Kwang-ki (born 13 October 1993) is a South Korean snowboarder. He has competed at the 2014 Winter Olympics in Sochi.
