= Derek Livingston =

Canadian snowboarder (born 1991)

Personal information
- Born: 5 January 1991 (age 35) Scarborough, Ontario, Canada
- Height: 1.72 m (5 ft 8 in)
- Weight: 68 kg (150 lb)

Sport
- Country: Canada
- Sport: Snowboarding
- Event: Halfpipe
- Team: National Team
- Coached by: Mike Slaughter

Derek Livingston (born 5 January 1991) is a Canadian snowboarder. He is a two-time Olympian in half-pipe representing Canada at the 2014 Winter Olympics in Sochi and the 2018 Winter Olympics in Pyongchang.

In January 2022, Livingston was named to his third Olympic team: Canada's 2022 Olympic team. However, after sustaining an injury in training, Livingston withdrew from the games.
