= Nikita Avtaneev =

Russian snowboarder (born 1995)

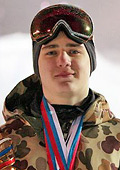

Personal information
- Nationality: Russian
- Born: Nikita Alekseevich Avtaneev; 3 September 1995 (age 30) Moscow, Russia
- Height: 1.83 m (6 ft 0 in)
- Weight: 80 kg (176 lb)
Medal record
Representing Russia
Winter Universiade
Gold medal – first place	2019 Krasnoyarsk	Halfpipe

Nikita Alekseevich Avtaneev (Russian: Ники́та Алексе́евич Автане́ев; born 3 September 1995) is a Russian snowboarder.

== Career ==
He competed at the 2014 Winter Olympics in Sochi.
