= Kent Callister =

Australian snowboarder (born 1995)

Kent Callister (born 9 November 1995 in San Diego) is an Australian snowboarder. He competed at the 2014 Winter Olympics in Sochi. His great-grandfather's second cousin, Cyril P. Callister, invented Vegemite.
