= Zhang Yiwei =

Chinese snowboarder (born 1992)

Medal record

Men's snowboarding

Representing China

World Championships
Silver medal – second place	2015 Kreischberg	Halfpipe

Zhang Yiwei
- Simplified Chinese: 张义威
- Traditional Chinese: 張義威
Transcriptions
Standard Mandarin
- Hanyu Pinyin: Zhāng Yīwěi
- IPA: [ʈʂáŋ î wéɪ]

Zhang Yiwei (Chinese: 张义威; pinyin: Zhāng Yīwěi; Mandarin pronunciation: [ʈʂáŋ î wéɪ]; born 3 October 1992) is a Chinese snowboarder. He is a participant at the 2014 Winter Olympics in Sochi.

In early 2015, Zhang Yiwei landed the first triple cork ever in a half-pipe.
