= Ruka Hirano =

Japanese snowboarder (born 2002)

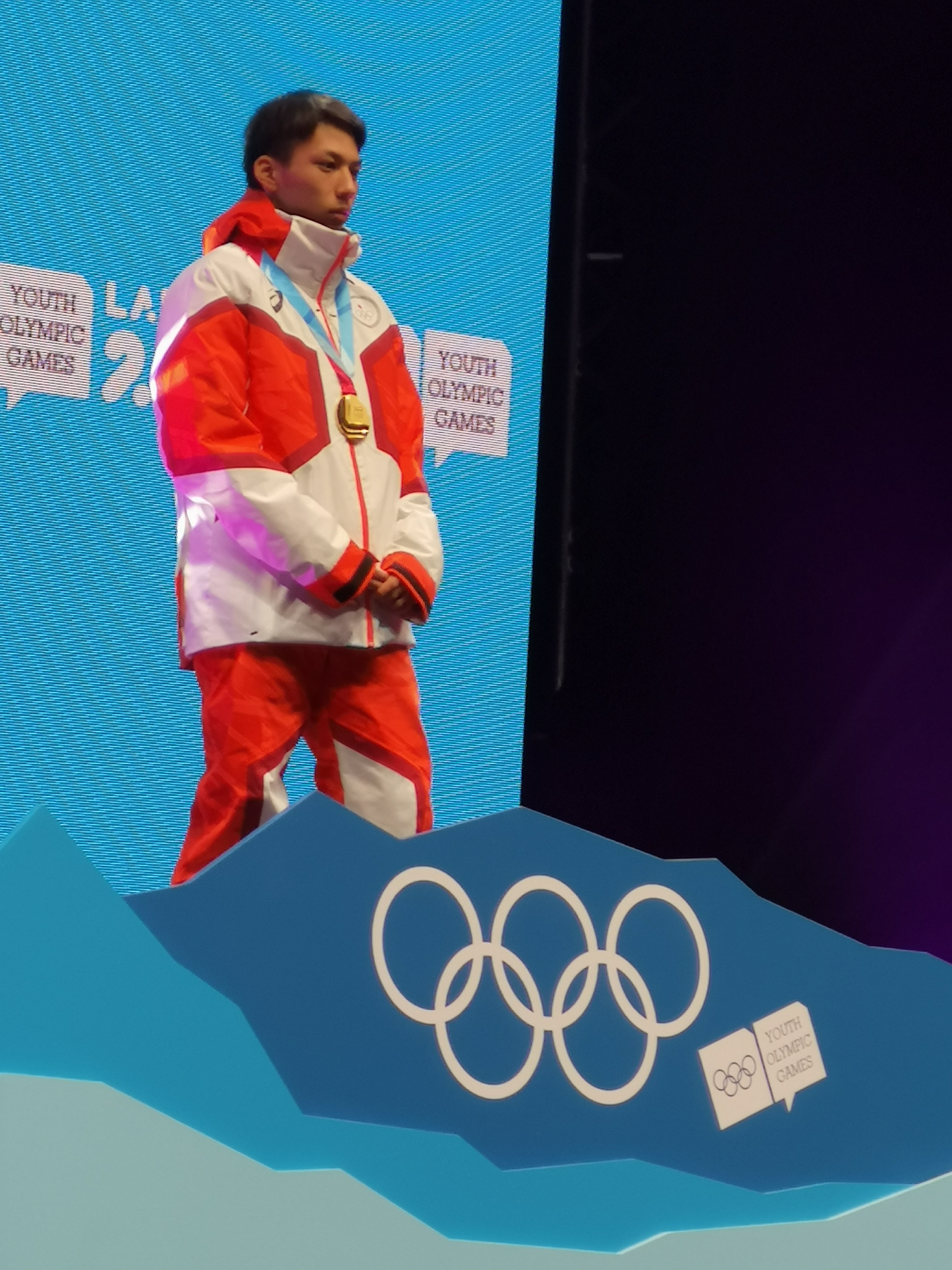
- Hirano at the 2020 Winter Youth Olympics

Personal information
- Native name: 平野流佳
- Nationality: Japanese
- Born: 12 March 2002 (age 24) Osaka, Japan
- Height: 162 cm (5 ft 4 in)

Sport
- Country: Japan
- Sport: Snowboarding
Medal record
Men's snowboarding
Representing Japan
World Championships
Silver medal – second place	2025 Engadin	Halfpipe
Winter Youth Olympics
Gold medal – first place	2020 Lausanne	Halfpipe
Winter X Games
Bronze medal – third place	2021 Aspen	SuperPipe

Ruka Hirano (平野 流佳, Hirano Ruka; born 12 March 2002) is a Japanese snowboarder. He competed at the 2022 Winter Olympics.
