= David Hablützel =

Swiss snowboarder (born 1996)

Personal information
- Born: 24 April 1996 (age 30) Truttikon, Zurich, Switzerland
- Height: 175 cm (5 ft 9 in)
- Weight: 65 kg (143 lb)

David Hablützel (born 24 April 1996) is a Swiss snowboarder. He competed at the 2014 Winter Olympics in Sochi. the 2022 Winter Olympics in Beijing, and the 2026 Winter Olympics in Milan and Cortina.
