= Tit Štante =

Slovenian snowboarder (born 1998)

Personal information
- Nationality: Slovenian
- Born: 11 October 1998 (age 27) Celje, Slovenia
- Height: 1.75 m (5 ft 9 in)

Sport
- Sport: Snowboarding
Medal record
Men's snowboarding
Representing Slovenia
Youth Olympic Games
Bronze medal – third place	2016 Lillehammer	Halfpipe

Tit Štante (born 11 October 1998) is a Slovenian snowboarder. He competed in the 2018 Winter Olympics.
