= Chase Josey =

American snowboarder (born 1995)

Personal information
- Born: March 31, 1995 (age 31) Hailey, Idaho, U.S.
- Home town: Hailey, Idaho, U.S.
- Height: 5 ft 11 in (180 cm)
- Weight: 155 lb (70 kg)

Sport
- Country: United States
- Sport: Snowboarding
- Event: Halfpipe
- Club: Sun Valley Education Foundation
Medal record
Men's Snowboarding
Representing United States
Winter X Games
Bronze medal – third place	2016 Oslo	SuperPipe

Chase Josey (born March 31, 1995) is an American snowboarder, who has specialised in the men's halfpipe events in the 2018, 2022 and 2026 Winter Olympics.
