= Snowboarding at the 2022 Winter Olympics – Women's big air =

Women's big air at the XXIV Olympic Winter Games
- Snowboarding
- Venue: Big Air Shougang, Beijing
- Date: 14, 15 February
- Competitors: 29 from 21 nations
- Winning time: 185.50

Medalists
1st place, gold medalist(s)		Anna Gasser	Austria
2nd place, silver medalist(s)		Zoi Sadowski-Synnott	New Zealand
3rd place, bronze medalist(s)		Kokomo Murase	Japan

The women's big air competition in snowboarding at the 2022 Winter Olympics was held on 14 February (qualification) and 15 February (final), at the Big Air Shougang in Beijing. Anna Gasser of Austria won the event, successfully defending her 2018 title. Zoi Sadowski-Synnott of New Zealand won the silver medal, and Kokomo Murase of Japan bronze, her first Olympic medal.

The 2018 silver medalist, Jamie Anderson, twice Olympic champion in slopestyle, and the bronze medalist, Sadowski-Synnott, qualified as well. Andreson did not qualify for the finals. At the 2021–22 FIS Snowboard World Cup, only two big air events were held before the Olympics. Gasser was second in both, and was leading the ranking, followed by Reira Iwabuchi and Murase. Laurie Blouin was the 2021 world champion, with Sadowski-Synnott and Miyabi Onitsuka being the silver and bronze medalists, respectively. Sadowski-Synnott was the 2021 X-Games winner, ahead of Anderson and Onitsuka.

== Qualification ==
A total of 30 snowboarders qualified to compete at the games. For an athlete to compete they must have a minimum of 50.00 FIS points in Big Air or Slopestyle on the FIS Points List on January 17, 2022 and a top 30 finish in a World Cup event in Big Air or slopestyle or at the FIS Snowboard World Championships 2021. A country could enter a maximum of four athletes into the event.

== Results ==
=== Qualification ===
Q — Qualified for the Final

The top 12 athletes in the qualifiers advanced to the Final.

Rank	Bib	Order	Name	Country	Run 1	Run 2	Run 3	Total	Notes
1	2	4	Zoi Sadowski-Synnott	New Zealand	85.50	62.25	91.00	176.50	Q
2	6	17	Kokomo Murase	Japan	85.00	72.75	86.00	171.00	Q
3	3	2	Reira Iwabuchi	Japan	83.00	75.50	11.75	158.50	Q
4	9	14	Laurie Blouin	Canada	68.00	67.25	88.25	156.25	Q
5	1	1	Miyabi Onitsuka	Japan	80.75	72.25	73.50	154.25	Q
6	7	24	Anna Gasser	Austria	73.25	62.25	80.25	153.50	Q
7	8	15	Tess Coady	Australia	74.00	54.75	62.25	136.25	Q
8	11	25	Annika Morgan	Germany	12.00	64.25	68.00	132.25	Q
9	30	13	Rong Ge	China	10.75	64.00	65.75	129.75	Q
10	17	18	Jasmine Baird	Canada	69.00	60.50	69.00	129.50	Q
11	13	8	Melissa Peperkamp	Netherlands	60.00	68.25	58.00	128.25	Q
12	15	19	Hailey Langland	United States	62.00	65.50	21.25	127.50	Q
13	23	9	Bianca Gisler	Switzerland	50.00	63.50	63.75	127.25	
14	20	11	Šárka Pančochová	Czech Republic	20.75	62.75	60.25	123.00	
15	4	5	Jamie Anderson	United States	30.00	29.50	89.75	119.75	
16	22	10	Klaudia Medlová	Slovakia	62.25	51.00	29.75	113.25	
17	31	12	Kamilla Kozuback	Hungary	51.50	5.50	59.00	110.50	
18	26	20	Urška Pribošič	Slovenia	43.00	25.75	63.75	106.75	
19	19	28	Courtney Rummel	United States	44.75	56.25	38.75	101.00	
20	28	6	Carola Niemelä	Finland	12.75	58.50	42.25	100.75	
21	10	22	Brooke Voigt	Canada	65.00	31.00	17.50	96.00	
22	5	3	Enni Rukajärvi	Finland	25.75	17.25	63.50	89.25	
23	21	16	Ariane Burri	Switzerland	57.75	18.75	27.25	85.00	
24	16	30	Evy Poppe	Belgium	44.00	60.75	21.00	81.75	
25	14	27	Katie Ormerod	Great Britain	14.75	60.25	9.50	69.75	
26	24	7	Ekaterina Kosova	ROC	17.00	46.00	10.50	63.00	
27	25	29	Hanne Eilertsen	Norway	39.75	17.50	12.75	57.25	
28	29	26	Lea Jugovac	Croatia	9.25	15.00	10.00	24.25	
29	27	21	Lucile Lefevre	France	19.00	15.00	20.00	20.00	
	12	23	Julia Marino	United States	DNS	DNS	DNS	DNS	

=== Final ===
Rank	Bib	Order	Name	Country	Run 1	Run 2	Run 3	Total
1st place, gold medalist(s)	7	7	Anna Gasser	Austria	90.00	86.75	95.50	185.50
2nd place, silver medalist(s)	2	12	Zoi Sadowski-Synnott	New Zealand	93.25	83.75	30.25	177.00
3rd place, bronze medalist(s)	6	11	Kokomo Murase	Japan	80.00	91.50	12.00	171.50
4	3	10	Reira Iwabuchi	Japan	83.75	82.25	37.00	166.00
5	30	4	Rong Ge	China	29.00	85.75	74.25	160.00
6	13	2	Melissa Peperkamp	Netherlands	64.25	72.00	69.75	141.75
7	17	3	Jasmine Baird	Canada	68.75	48.75	61.25	130.00
8	9	9	Laurie Blouin	Canada	13.50	86.25	28.75	115.00
9	8	6	Tess Coady	Australia	85.00	29.75	8.50	114.75
10	11	5	Annika Morgan	Germany	15.50	73.50	14.50	88.00
11	1	8	Miyabi Onitsuka	Japan	9.50	54.50	10.75	65.25
12	15	1	Hailey Langland	United States	25.25	31.00	22.25	56.25
