= FIS Freestyle Ski and Snowboarding World Championships 2021 – Women's snowboard big air =

Women's snowboard big air at the FIS Freestyle Ski and Snowboarding World Championships 2021
- Venue: Aspen/Snowmass
- Location: Aspen, United States
- Date: 14 March (qualification); 16 March
- Competitors: 26 from 17 nations
- Winning points: 177.75

Medalists
gold medal	Laurie Blouin	Canada
silver medal	Zoi Sadowski-Synnott	New Zealand
bronze medal	Miyabi Onitsuka	Japan

The Women's snowboard big air competition at the FIS Freestyle Ski and Snowboarding World Championships 2021 was held on 16 March. A qualification was held on 14 March 2021.

== Qualification ==
The qualification was started on 14 March at 13:30. The eight best snowboarders qualified for the final.

Rank	Bib	Start order	Name	Country	Run 1	Run 2	Best	Notes
1	4	7	Anna Gasser	Austria	79.25	92.75	92.75	Q
2	5	6	Laurie Blouin	Canada	92.25	15.50	92.25	Q
3	3	2	Zoi Sadowski-Synnott	New Zealand	36.00	90.75	90.75	Q
4	6	10	Reira Iwabuchi	Japan	90.00	21.00	90.00	Q
5	7	9	Kokomo Murase	Japan	88.00	87.25	88.00	Q
6	8	4	Tess Coady	Australia	87.50	30.00	87.50	Q
7	2	1	Miyabi Onitsuka	Japan	82.75	86.50	86.50	Q
8	1	8	Jamie Anderson	United States	77.50	23.75	77.50	Q
9	14	16	Annika Morgan	Germany	71.75	74.50	74.50	
10	20	27	Klaudia Medlová	Slovakia	23.75	72.25	72.25	
11	13	26	Melissa Peperkamp	Netherlands	61.25	72.00	72.00	
12	10	3	Katie Ormerod	Great Britain	67.25	71.25	71.25	
13	26	21	Cool Wakushima	New Zealand	69.75	17.75	69.75	
14	15	23	Hanne Eilertsen	Norway	58.25	67.00	67.00	
15	27	22	Maria Hidalgo	Spain	54.50	63.75	63.75	
16	23	19	Šárka Pančochová	Czech Republic	62.25	31.50	62.25	
17	17	12	Enni Rukajärvi	Finland	61.75	54.25	61.75	
18	28	20	Jasmine Baird	Canada	55.25	57.75	57.75	
19	21	24	Hinari Asanuma	Japan	20.50	43.75	43.75	
20	48	13	Jade Thurgood	United States	42.25	11.00	42.25	
21	24	18	Ty Schnorrbusch	United States	38.00	13.00	38.00	
22	25	11	Lea Jugovac	Croatia	5.50	34.25	34.25	
23	18	15	Loranne Smans	Belgium	13.75	26.75	26.75	
24	12	5	Brooke Voigt	Canada	8.75	20.75	20.75	
25	19	14	Hailey Langland	United States	1.00	19.75	19.75	
26	22	25	Lucile Lefevre	France	18.50	18.00	18.50	
	29	17	Terra Traub	Chinese Taipei	Did not start			

=== Final ===
The final was started on 16 March at 13:30.

Rank	Bib	Start order	Name	Country	Run 1	Run 2	Run 3	Total
1st place, gold medalist(s)	2	7	Laurie Blouin	Canada	88.00	35.25	89.75	177.75
2nd place, silver medalist(s)	3	6	Zoi Sadowski-Synnott	New Zealand	92.00	84.75	26.75	176.75
3rd place, bronze medalist(s)	7	2	Miyabi Onitsuka	Japan	89.75	17.00	85.00	174.75
4	1	8	Anna Gasser	Austria	84.75	21.00	85.50	170.25
5	6	3	Tess Coady	Australia	81.75	48.75	70.00	151.75
6	5	4	Kokomo Murase	Japan	84.25	24.00	26.00	110.25
7	8	1	Jamie Anderson	United States	71.25	18.75	18.50	90.00
8	4	5	Reira Iwabuchi	Japan	23.50	38.25	17.00	61.75
