= Snowboarding at the 2022 Winter Olympics – Women's slopestyle =

Women's slopestyle at the XXIV Olympic Winter Games
- Snowboarding
- Venue: Genting Snow Park, Zhangjiakou
- Date: 5, 6 February
- Competitors: 28 from 18 nations
- Winning score: 92.88

Medalists
1st place, gold medalist(s)		Zoi Sadowski-Synnott	New Zealand
2nd place, silver medalist(s)		Julia Marino	United States
3rd place, bronze medalist(s)		Tess Coady	Australia

The women's slopestyle competition in snowboarding at the 2022 Winter Olympics was held on 5 February (qualification) and 6 February (final), at the Genting Snow Park in Zhangjiakou.

== Summary ==
Jamie Anderson won both previous slopestyle events at the Olympics, in 2014 and 2018, and qualified for the 2022 Olympics to defend her title. The 2018 silver medalist, Laurie Blouin, and the bronze medalist, Enni Rukajärvi, qualified at the Olympics as well. At the 2021–22 FIS Snowboard World Cup, only three slopestyle events were held before the Olympics. Kokomo Murase was leading the ranking, followed by Melissa Peperkamp and Reira Iwabuchi. Zoi Sadowski-Synnott is the 2021 world champion, with Jamie Anderson and Tess Coady being the silver and bronze medalists, respectively. Zoi Sadowski-Synnott is also the 2022 X Games winner, ahead of Jamie Anderson and Miyabi Onitsuka.

Zoi Sadowski-Synnott won the gold medal, becoming the first person from New Zealand to win a Winter Olympic gold medal. Julia Marino of the United States and Tess Coady of Australia won silver and bronze, respectively. For Marino and Coady, this was the first Olympic medals.

== Qualification ==
A total of 30 snowboarders qualified to compete at the games. For an athlete to compete they must have a minimum of 50.00 FIS points in Big Air or Slopestyle on the FIS Points List on 17 January 2022 and a top 30 finish in a World Cup event in Big Air or slopestyle or at the FIS Snowboard World Championships 2021. A country could enter a maximum of four athletes into the event.

== Results ==
=== Qualification ===
Q — Qualified for the Final

The top 12 athletes in the qualifiers advanced to the Final.

Rank	Bib	Order	Name	Country	Run 1	Run 2	Best	Notes
1	1	2	Zoi Sadowski-Synnott	New Zealand	73.58	86.75	86.75	Q
2	6	10	Kokomo Murase	Japan	74.95	81.45	81.45	Q
3	3	1	Enni Rukajärvi	Finland	66.75	78.83	78.83	Q
4	4	4	Anna Gasser	Austria	50.71	75.00	75.00	Q
5	2	5	Jamie Anderson	United States	74.35	53.26	74.35	Q
6	9	19	Julia Marino	United States	2.91	71.78	71.78	Q
7	8	17	Laurie Blouin	Canada	66.85	71.55	71.55	Q
8	5	3	Tess Coady	Australia	55.98	71.13	71.13	Q
9	12	9	Hailey Langland	United States	28.31	68.71	68.71	Q
10	11	24	Annika Morgan	Germany	29.61	67.63	67.63	Q
11	7	14	Reira Iwabuchi	Japan	48.51	67.00	67.00	Q
12	19	28	Ariane Burri	Switzerland	33.15	65.55	65.55	Q
13	10	18	Melissa Peperkamp	Netherlands	61.26	60.18	61.26	
14	13	22	Evy Poppe	Belgium	47.08	56.80	56.80	
15	14	20	Jasmine Baird	Canada	49.50	14.41	49.50	
16	22	8	Hanne Eilertsen	Norway	48.35	35.30	48.35	
17	16	23	Courtney Rummel	United States	37.18	48.30	48.30	
18	17	6	Katie Ormerod	Great Britain	47.38	44.01	47.38	
19	20	13	Miyabi Onitsuka	Japan	42.60	46.58	46.58	
20	21	27	Bianca Gisler	Switzerland	40.35	38.43	40.35	
21	26	7	Carola Niemelä	Finland	22.36	38.43	38.43	
22	18	26	Brooke Voigt	Canada	37.11	12.78	37.11	
23	15	30	Cool Wakushima	New Zealand	34.46	DNS	34.46	
24	29	29	Urška Pribošič	Slovenia	27.48	32.00	32.00	
25	28	11	Rong Ge	China	29.36	13.01	29.36	
26	23	21	Šárka Pančochová	Czech Republic	25.51	17.18	25.51	
27	25	12	Lucile Lefevre	France	23.16	21.98	23.16	
28	31	25	Kamilla Kozuback	Hungary	21.95	19.58	21.95	
	27	15	Klaudia Medlová	Slovakia	Did not start			
	30	16	Lea Jugovac	Croatia	Did not start			

=== Final ===
Rank	Bib	Order	Name	Country	Run 1	Run 2	Run 3	Best
1st place, gold medalist(s)	1	12	Zoi Sadowski-Synnott	New Zealand	84.51	28.15	92.88	92.88
2nd place, silver medalist(s)	9	7	Julia Marino	United States	30.61	87.68	60.35	87.68
3rd place, bronze medalist(s)	5	5	Tess Coady	Australia	82.68	55.98	84.15	84.15
4	8	6	Laurie Blouin	Canada	77.96	46.70	81.41	81.41
5	7	2	Reira Iwabuchi	Japan	75.60	80.03	46.15	80.03
6	4	9	Anna Gasser	Austria	35.01	43.58	75.33	75.33
7	3	10	Enni Rukajärvi	Finland	30.51	71.45	23.43	71.45
8	11	3	Annika Morgan	Germany	64.13	31.01	28.76	64.13
9	2	8	Jamie Anderson	United States	22.98	60.78	36.88	60.78
10	6	11	Kokomo Murase	Japan	48.50	49.05	48.00	49.05
11	12	4	Hailey Langland	United States	32.05	48.35	29.93	48.35
12	19	1	Ariane Burri	Switzerland	21.40	24.01	18.86	24.01
