= Snowboarding at the 2018 Winter Olympics – Women's big air =

Women's big air at the XXIII Olympic Winter Games
- Venue: Alpensia Ski Jumping Stadium
- Date: 19 February (qualification); 22 February (final)
- Competitors: 26 from 14 nations
- Winning Score: 185.00

Medalists
1st place, gold medalist(s)		Anna Gasser	Austria
2nd place, silver medalist(s)		Jamie Anderson	United States
3rd place, bronze medalist(s)		Zoi Sadowski-Synnott	New Zealand

The women's big air competition of the 2018 Winter Olympics was held on 19 and 22 February 2018 at the Alpensia Ski Jumping Stadium in Pyeongchang, South Korea. The event made its Olympic debut.

== Qualification ==
The top 30 athletes in the Olympic quota allocation list qualified (for both big air and slopestyle, the rankings were combined). This meant only a maximum of 30 could qualify across both events. A maximum of four athletes per National Olympic Committee (NOC) was allowed. All athletes qualifying must also have placed in the top 30 of a FIS World Cup event (in either big air or slopestyle) or the FIS Freestyle Ski and Snowboarding World Championships 2017 during the qualification period (1 July 2016 to 21 January 2018) and also have a minimum of 50 FIS points to compete. If the host country, South Korea at the 2018 Winter Olympics did not qualify, their chosen athlete would displace the last qualified athlete, granted all qualification criterion was met.

=== Qualification ===
Q — Qualified for the Final

The top 12 athletes in the qualifiers moved on to the medal round.

Rank	Order	Name	Country	Run 1	Run 2	Best	Notes
1	14	Anna Gasser	Austria	88.25	98.00	98.00	Q
2	12	Yuka Fujimori	Japan	82.00	94.25	94.25	Q
3	11	Reira Iwabuchi	Japan	80.00	92.75	92.75	Q
4	16	Laurie Blouin	Canada	90.25	92.25	92.25	Q
5	7	Zoi Sadowski-Synnott	New Zealand	72.75	92.00	92.00	Q
6	9	Jamie Anderson	United States	30.25	90.00	90.00	Q
7	15	Miyabi Onitsuka	Japan	81.75	86.50	86.50	Q
8	5	Sina Candrian	Switzerland	31.75	86.00	86.00	Q
9	6	Julia Marino	United States	83.75	85.25	85.25	Q
10	13	Silje Norendal	Norway	76.00	77.50	77.50	Q
11	4	Spencer O'Brien	Canada	69.50	76.75	76.75	Q
12	17	Jessika Jenson	United States	76.25	39.75	76.25	Q
13	24	Jessica Rich	Australia	73.50	74.25	74.25	
14	3	Hailey Langland	United States	73.00	29.00	73.00	
15	19	Carla Somaini	Switzerland	70.75	24.75	70.75	
16	10	Enni Rukajärvi	Finland	68.75	49.75	68.75	
17	8	Brooke Voigt	Canada	67.75	32.00	67.75	
18	26	Elena Könz	Switzerland	62.00	65.75	65.75	
19	22	Šárka Pančochová	Czech Republic	65.50	30.00	65.50	
20	1	Cheryl Maas	Netherlands	65.00	44.75	65.00	
21	18	Sofya Fyodorova	Olympic Athletes from Russia	64.00	23.25	64.00	
22	23	Isabel Derungs	Switzerland	54.00	59.25	59.25	
23	21	Klaudia Medlová	Slovakia	30.75	50.50	50.50	
24	25	Asami Hirono	Japan	27.50	37.75	37.75	
25	2	Aimee Fuller	Great Britain	25.00	14.25	25.00	
26	20	Kateřina Vojáčková	Czech Republic	19.00	10.50	19.00	

=== Final ===
The final was held on 22 February 2018.

Rank	Start Order	Bib	Name	Country	Run 1	Run 2	Run 3	Total	Notes
1st place, gold medalist(s)	12	1	Anna Gasser	Austria	JNS	89.00	96.00	185.00	
2nd place, silver medalist(s)	7	2	Jamie Anderson	United States	90.00	87.25	JNS	177.25	
3rd place, bronze medalist(s)	8	8	Zoi Sadowski-Synnott	New Zealand	65.50	92.00	JNS	157.50	
4	10	13	Reira Iwabuchi	Japan	79.75	67.75	JNS	147.50	
5	5	9	Sina Candrian	Switzerland	JNS	76.25	64.00	140.25	
6	3	5	Silje Norendal	Norway	70.50	61.00	JNS	131.50	
7	11	12	Yuka Fujimori	Japan	82.25	40.50	JNS	122.75	
8	6	7	Miyabi Onitsuka	Japan	78.75	JNS	40.25	119.00	
9	2	6	Spencer O'Brien	Canada	51.25	JNS	62.00	113.25	
10	4	4	Julia Marino	United States	JNS	74.50	18.75	93.25	
11	1	20	Jessika Jenson	United States	JNS	21.50	19.00	40.50	
12	9	10	Laurie Blouin	Canada	JNS	39.25	DNS	39.25	
