= FIS Freestyle Ski and Snowboarding World Championships 2019 – Women's snowboard slopestyle =

Women's snowboard slopestyle at the FIS Freestyle Ski and Snowboarding World Championships 2019
- Venue: Park City Mountain Resort
- Location: Utah, United States
- Dates: February 9–10
- Competitors: 28 from 16 nations
- Winning time: 91.75

Medalists
gold medal	Zoi Sadowski-Synnott	New Zealand
silver medal	Silje Norendal	Norway
bronze medal	Jamie Anderson	United States

The Women's snowboard slopestyle competition at the FIS Freestyle Ski and Snowboarding World Championships 2019 will be held on February 9 and 10, 2019.

The final was cancelled due to weather conditions and the qualification results were used to determine the final ranking.

== Qualification ==
The qualification was started on February 9, at 12:10. The eight best snowboarders qualified for the final.

Rank	Bib	Name	Country	Run 1	Run 2	Best	Notes
1	27	Zoi Sadowski-Synnott	New Zealand	91.75	6.00	91.75	Q
2	8	Silje Norendal	Norway	88.75	47.50	88.75	Q
3	2	Jamie Anderson	United States	62.50	87.25	87.25	Q
4	25	Cheryl Maas	Netherlands	84.25	78.00	84.25	Q
5	20	Reira Iwabuchi	Japan	61.00	82.75	82.75	Q
6	12	Jasmine Baird	Canada	82.50	31.25	82.50	Q
7	11	Klaudia Medlová	Slovakia	36.00	78.50	78.50	Q
8	6	Brooke Voigt	Canada	78.25	44.75	78.25	Q
9	9	Laurie Blouin	Canada	75.75	37.00	75.75	
10	7	Enni Rukajärvi	Finland	53.75	69.50	69.50	
11	10	Sina Candrian	Switzerland	68.75	35.00	68.75	
12	5	Isabel Derungs	Switzerland	68.00	43.25	68.00	
13	14	Nadja Flemming	Germany	51.00	67.25	67.25	
14	24	Sommer Gendron	Canada	61.75	46.75	61.75	
15	15	Ekaterina Kosova	Russia	60.75	26.75	60.75	
16	28	Antonia Yanez	Chile	55.50	25.25	55.50	
17	4	Miyabi Onitsuka	Japan	53.50	34.50	53.50	
18	26	Urška Pribošič	Slovenia	48.00	36.25	48.00	
19	3	Julia Marino	United States	47.50	6.25	47.50	
20	1	Hailey Langland	United States	43.50	38.75	43.50	
21	18	Šárka Pančochová	Czech Republic	25.00	20.25	25.00	
22	21	Christy Prior	New Zealand	23.25	DNS	23.25	
23	13	Loranne Smans	Belgium	20.00	17.25	20.00	
24	22	Guo Junyan	China	15.00	9.75	15.00	
25	23	Li Dongyu	China	1.00	14.00	14.00	
26	17	Jade Thurgood	United States	13.25	1.00	13.25	
27	16	Zhang Tong	China	10.25	DNS	10.25	
—	19	Ren Zizheng	China	Did not start			

== Final ==
Rank	Bib	Name	Country	Run 1	Run 2	Run 3	Best	Notes
	1	Brooke Voigt	Canada					
	2	Klaudia Medlová	Slovakia					
	3	Jasmine Baird	Canada					
	4	Reira Iwabuchi	Japan					
	5	Cheryl Maas	Netherlands					
	6	Jamie Anderson	United States					
	7	Silje Norendal	Norway					
	8	Zoi Sadowski-Synnott	New Zealand					
