= Snowboarding at the 2018 Winter Olympics – Women's slopestyle =

Women's slopestyle at the XXIII Olympic Winter Games
- Venue: Bogwang Phoenix Park
- Date: 12 February
- Competitors: 26 from 15 nations
- Winning Score: 83.00

Medalists
1st place, gold medalist(s)		Jamie Anderson	United States
2nd place, silver medalist(s)		Laurie Blouin	Canada
3rd place, bronze medalist(s)		Enni Rukajärvi	Finland

The women's slopestyle competition of the 2018 Winter Olympics was held on 12 February 2018 at the Bogwang Phoenix Park in Pyeongchang, South Korea.

== Summary ==
Due to high winds, the qualification round originally scheduled for 11 February 2018 was cancelled. All athletes competed in a two-run final round instead of the typical two-run qualification round and three-run final round.

Due to the high winds on the final day, the snowboarding event was delayed for more than an hour. The strong headwinds continued into the final, causing many falls amongst the competitors. Of the 25 participants, only five managed to stay on their feet during the first run. No snowboarders recorded two clear runs. Several snowboarders said that the final was irresponsible. According to the FIS, the conditions were "within the norm".

The 2014 Olympic champion Jamie Anderson successfully defended her title. Laurie Blouin won the silver medal, and Enni Rukajärvi, the 2014 silver medalist, the bronze. The gold medal score would have placed 7th in the 2014 Olympics; the silver and bronze medal scores would have failed to qualify in the 2014 Olympics.

In the victory ceremony, the medals were presented by Sarah Walker, member of the International Olympic Committee accompanied by Dexter Paine, FIS vice president.

== Qualification ==
The top 30 athletes in the Olympic quota allocation list qualified (for both big air and slopestyle, the rankings were combined). This meant only a maximum of 30 could qualify across both events. A maximum of four athletes per National Olympic Committee (NOC) was allowed. All athletes qualifying must also have placed in the top 30 of a FIS World Cup event or the FIS Freestyle Ski and Snowboarding World Championships 2017 during the qualification period (July 1, 2016 to January 21, 2018) and also have a minimum of 50 FIS points to compete. If the host country, South Korea did not qualify, their chosen athlete would displace the last qualified athlete, if all qualification criteria were met.

== Results ==
The final was started at 10:33.

Rank	Order	Name	Country	Run 1	Run 2	Best	Notes
1st place, gold medalist(s)	26	Jamie Anderson	United States	83.00	34.56	83.00	
2nd place, silver medalist(s)	20	Laurie Blouin	Canada	49.16	76.33	76.33	
3rd place, bronze medalist(s)	22	Enni Rukajärvi	Finland	45.85	75.38	75.38	
4	15	Silje Norendal	Norway	73.91	47.66	73.91	
5	9	Jessika Jenson	United States	72.76	41.11	72.76	
6	19	Hailey Langland	United States	41.26	71.80	71.80	
7	11	Sina Candrian	Switzerland	66.35	39.80	66.35	
8	8	Sofya Fyodorova	Olympic Athletes from Russia	27.53	65.73	65.73	
9	13	Yuka Fujimori	Japan	63.73	48.51	63.73	
10	10	Elena Könz	Switzerland	17.28	59.00	59.00	
11	25	Julia Marino	United States	55.85	41.05	55.85	
12	5	Asami Hirono	Japan	49.80	27.26	49.80	
13	21	Zoi Sadowski-Synnott	New Zealand	26.70	48.38	48.38	
14	16	Reira Iwabuchi	Japan	48.33	31.06	48.33	
15	24	Anna Gasser	Austria	42.05	46.56	46.56	
16	1	Šárka Pančochová	Czech Republic	43.46	39.18	43.46	
17	14	Aimee Fuller	Great Britain	34.63	41.43	41.43	
18	12	Isabel Derungs	Switzerland	39.66	31.98	39.66	
19	18	Miyabi Onitsuka	Japan	33.25	39.55	39.55	
20	4	Carla Somaini	Switzerland	36.71	23.08	36.71	
21	17	Brooke Voigt	Canada	24.36	36.61	36.61	
22	23	Spencer O'Brien	Canada	26.43	36.45	36.45	
23	7	Cheryl Maas	Netherlands	31.71	35.30	35.30	
24	3	Klaudia Medlová	Slovakia	26.16	34.00	34.00	
25	2	Lucile Lefevre	France	28.35	17.31	28.35	
26	6	Silvia Mittermueller	Germany	1.00	DNS	1.00	
