= Snowboarding at the 2018 Winter Olympics =

Snowboarding at the XXIII Olympic Winter Games
- Pictograms from top, left to right: Big Air, Cross, Halfpipe, Parallel Giant Slalom, and Slopestyle.
- Venue: Bokwang Phoenix Park; Alpensia Ski Jumping Stadium
- Dates: 10–24 February 2018
- No. of events: 10 (5 men, 5 women)
- Competitors: 248 from 30 nations

Snowboarding at the 2018 Winter Olympics was held at the Bokwang Phoenix Park and Alpensia Ski Jumping Stadium in Pyeongchang, South Korea. A total of ten snowboarding events were scheduled to take place between 10 and 24 February 2018.

The parallel slalom event, which made its debut four years earlier at the 2014 Winter Olympics in Sochi, was dropped from the games in 2018 in favour of a new big air event.

== Qualification ==
A total of 258 quota spots were available to athletes to compete at the games (142 men and 116 women). Each National Olympic Committee was permitted to enter a maximum of 26 athletes, with a maximum of 14 men or 14 women. Each event had its own maximum number of quota spots, however slopestyle and big air were calculated jointly per nation.

== Competition schedule ==
The following was the competition schedule for all ten events.

Sessions that included the event finals are shown in bold.

All times are (UTC+9).

Date	Time	Event
10 February	10:00	Men's slopestyle
11 February	10:00	**Men's slopestyle**
11 February	13:30	Women's slopestyle
12 February	10:00	**Women's slopestyle**
12 February	13:30	Women's halfpipe
13 February	10:00	**Women's halfpipe**
13 February	13:00	Men's halfpipe
14 February	10:30	**Men's halfpipe**
15 February	11:00	**Men's snowboard cross**
16 February	10:00	**Women's snowboard cross**
19 February	10:00	Women's big air
21 February	09:30	Men's big air
22 February	09:30	**Women's big air**
24 February	09:00	Women's parallel giant slalom Men's parallel giant slalom
24 February	10:00	**Men's big air**
24 February	13:30	**Women's parallel giant slalom** **Men's parallel giant slalom**

== Medal summary ==
=== Medal table ===
* Host nation (South Korea)

Rank	Nation	Gold	Silver	Bronze	Total
1	United States	4	2	1	7
2	Canada	1	2	1	4
3	France	1	1	0	2
4	Czech Republic	1	0	1	2
5	Austria	1	0	0	1
5	Italy	1	0	0	1
5	Switzerland	1	0	0	1
8	Australia	0	1	1	2
8	Germany	0	1	1	2
10	China	0	1	0	1
10	Japan	0	1	0	1
10	South Korea*	0	1	0	1
13	Finland	0	0	1	1
13	Great Britain	0	0	1	1
13	New Zealand	0	0	1	1
13	Slovenia	0	0	1	1
13	Spain	0	0	1	1
Totals (17 entries)		**10**	**10**	**10**	**30**

=== Men's events ===
Event	Gold		Silver		Bronze	
Big air	Sébastien Toutant; Canada	174.25	Kyle Mack; United States	168.75	Billy Morgan; Great Britain	168.00
Halfpipe	Shaun White; United States	97.75	Ayumu Hirano; Japan	95.25	Scotty James; Australia	92.00
Parallel giant slalom	Nevin Galmarini; Switzerland		Lee Sang-ho; South Korea		Žan Košir; Slovenia	
Slopestyle	Red Gerard; United States	87.16	Max Parrot; Canada	86.00	Mark McMorris; Canada	85.20
Snowboard cross	Pierre Vaultier; France		Jarryd Hughes; Australia		Regino Hernández; Spain	

=== Women's events ===
Event	Gold		Silver		Bronze	
Big air	Anna Gasser; Austria	185.00	Jamie Anderson; United States	177.25	Zoi Sadowski-Synnott; New Zealand	157.50
Halfpipe	Chloe Kim; United States	98.25	Liu Jiayu; China	89.75	Arielle Gold; United States	85.75
Parallel giant slalom	Ester Ledecká; Czech Republic		Selina Jörg; Germany		Ramona Theresia Hofmeister; Germany	
Slopestyle	Jamie Anderson; United States	83.00	Laurie Blouin; Canada	76.33	Enni Rukajärvi; Finland	75.38
Snowboard cross	Michela Moioli; Italy		Julia Pereira de Sousa-Mabileau; France		Eva Samková; Czech Republic	

== Participating nations ==
A total of 248 athletes from 30 nations (including the IOC's designation of Olympic Athletes from Russia) were scheduled to participate (the numbers of athletes are shown in parentheses).

- Andorra (1)
- Argentina (2)
- Australia (11)
- Austria (14)
- Belgium (3)
- Brazil (1)
- Bulgaria (3)
- Canada (21)
- China (9)
- Czech Republic (7)
- Finland (8)
- France (13)
- Germany (13)
- Great Britain (5)
- Ireland (1)
- Italy (12)
- Japan (16)
- Netherlands (3)
- Norway (5)
- New Zealand (4)
- Olympic Athletes from Russia (16)
- Poland (6)
- Slovenia (7)
- South Korea (10)
- Spain (4)
- Sweden (2)
- Switzerland (24)
- Slovakia (1)
- Ukraine (1)
- United States (25)
