= FIS Freestyle Ski and Snowboarding World Championships 2017 – Women's snowboard slopestyle =

The women's snowboard slopestyle competition of the FIS Freestyle Ski and Snowboarding World Championships 2017 was held at Sierra Nevada, Spain on March 9 (qualifying) and March 11 (finals). 35 athletes from 21 countries competed.

== Qualification ==
The following are the results of the qualification.

Rank	Bib	Name	Country	Run 1	Run 2	Best	Notes
1	9	Miyabi Onitsuka	Japan	87.00	93.00	93.00	Q
2	3	Laurie Blouin	Canada	90.50	9.00	90.50	Q
3	12	Karly Shorr	United States	39.50	84.75	84.75	Q
4	18	Jessika Jenson	United States	84.50	7.50	84.50	Q
5	17	Zoi Sadowski-Synnott	New Zealand	81.75	43.00	81.75	Q
6	16	Isabel Derungs	Switzerland	79.25	53.50	79.25	Q
7	5	Yuka Fujimori	Japan	72.25	9.25	72.25	Q
8	2	Brooke Voigt	Canada	71.50	26.50	71.50	Q
9	38	Hanne Eilertsen	Norway	68.50	13.25	68.50	
10	8	Elena Könz	Switzerland	51.00	65.75	65.75	
11	25	Tess Coady	Australia	4.00	63.50	63.50	
12	42	Katarzyna Rusin	Poland	60.00	12.00	60.00	
13	1	Sina Candrian	Switzerland	49.25	54.50	54.50	
14	4	Aimee Fuller	Great Britain	50.50	43.00	50.50	
15	14	Silvia Mittermüller	Germany	48.25	21.25	48.25	
16	10	Kateřina Vojáčková	Czech Republic	48.00	41.25	48.00	
17	20	Nadja Flemming	Germany	1.00	42.25	42.25	
18	21	Sofya Fedorova	Russia	16.00	37.50	37.50	
19	7	Babs Barnhoorn	Netherlands	4.75	34.75	34.75	
20	31	Lea Jugovac	Croatia	32.25	18.75	32.25	
21	24	Kirra Kotsenburg	United States	31.00	17.25	31.00	
22	33	María Hidalgo	Spain	28.50	29.25	29.25	
23	30	Anastasia Zhukova	Russia	25.75	4.75	25.75	
24	15	Šárka Pančochová	Czech Republic	20.00	24.25	24.25	
25	6	Asami Hirono	Japan	22.50	13.25	22.50	
26	41	Sandra Isabel Hillen Rodriguez	Mexico	21.25	21.75	21.75	
27	32	Ty Walker	United States	18.25	17.00	18.25	
28	22	Antonia Yañez	Chile	9.50	17.50	17.50	
29	35	Elena Kostenko	Russia	7.00	8.00	8.00	
30	26	Carla Somaini	Switzerland	6.50	7.75	7.75	
31	29	Natalie Good	New Zealand	6.25	1.00	6.25	
32	13	Lucile Lefevre	France	2.00	5.25	5.25	
33	40	Zhang Tong	China	1.00	DNS	1.00	
	27	Ella Suitiala	Finland	DNS	DNS	DNS	
	19	Urška Pribošič	Slovenia	DNS	DNS	DNS	

== Final ==
The following are the results of the finals.

Rank	Bib	Name	Country	Run 1	Run 2	Best
1st place, gold medalist(s)	3	Laurie Blouin	Canada	27.85	78.00	78.00
2nd place, silver medalist(s)	17	Zoi Sadowski-Synnott	New Zealand	26.85	77.50	77.50
3rd place, bronze medalist(s)	9	Miyabi Onitsuka	Japan	70.85	77.40	77.40
4	12	Karly Shorr	United States	68.15	41.75	68.15
5	16	Isabel Derungs	Switzerland	63.85	66.80	66.80
6	18	Jessika Jenson	United States	10.20	63.00	63.00
7	2	Brooke Voigt	Canada	33.60	46.15	46.15
8	5	Yuka Fujimori	Japan	5.10	32.95	32.95
