= Winter X Games XXIII =

2019 extreme sports tournament

Winter X Games XXIII (Winter X Games Twenty-Two)
- Location: (United States) Aspen, Colorado
- Dates: 24–27 January 2019

Winter X Games XXIII (re-titled Winter X Games Aspen '19; styled as Winter X Games Twenty-Three in the official logo) were held from January 24 to January 27, 2019, in Aspen, Colorado. They are the 18th consecutive Winter X Games held in Aspen. The events were broadcast on ESPN.

Participating athletes compete in six skiing events, eight snowboarding events, one snowmobiling event and five snow bike events.

== Results ==
=== Medal count ===
* Host nation (United States)

Rank	Nation	Gold	Silver	Bronze	Total
1	United States (USA)*	7	5	8	20
2	Canada (CAN)	3	5	2	10
3	Norway (NOR)	2	1	2	5
4	Australia (AUS)	2	0	0	2
5	Estonia (EST)	1	1	1	3
5	New Zealand (NZL)	1	1	1	3
7	Japan (JPN)	1	1	0	2
7	Switzerland (SUI)	1	1	0	2
9	Sweden (SWE)	1	0	1	2
10	Finland (FIN)	0	1	1	2
11	Chile (CHI)	0	1	0	1
11	Spain (ESP)	0	1	0	1
13	China (PRC)	0	0	1	1
13	Great Britain (GBR)	0	0	1	1
Totals (14 entries)		19	18	18	55

=== Skiing ===
==== Women's SuperPipe results ====
Rank	Name	Run 1	Run 2	Run 3	Best Score
Gold medal	Cassie Sharpe (CAN)	88.66	29.00	94.00	94.00
Silver medal	Kelly Sildaru (EST)	92.33	89.00	90.66	92.33
Bronze medal	Rachael Karker (CAN)	82.00	86.33	83.00	86.33
4	Brita Sigourney (USA)	84.66	75.66	68.33	84.66
5	Maddie Bowman (USA)	83.33	25.00	29.66	83.33
6	Ayana Onozuka (JPN)	75.00	61.33	33.33	75.00
7	Devin Logan (USA)	4.33	64.66	42.33	64.66
8	Annalisa Drew (USA)	6.33	4.66	59.00	59.00

==== Men's SuperPipe results ====
Rank	Name	Run 1	Run 2	Run 3	Best Score
Gold medal	Alex Ferreira (USA)	90.33	81.00	92.66	92.66
Silver medal	David Wise (USA)	19.66	20.66	90.33	90.33
Bronze medal	Nico Porteous (NZL)	59.00	89.00	30.33	89.00
4	Kevin Rolland (FRA)	87.66	86.66	12.33	87.66
5	Birk Irving (USA)	24.00	69.66	14.33	69.66
6	Noah Bowman (CAN)	7.66	7.66	66.33	66.33
7	Simon d'Artois (CAN)	14.33	65.33	34.00	65.33
8	Aaron Blunck (USA)	25.33	57.00	7.00	57.00
9	Taylor Seaton (USA)	45.33	52.33	5.00	52.33
10	Gus Kenworthy (USA)	27.66	28.66	26.33	28.66

==== Women's SlopeStyle results ====
Rank	Name	Run 1	Run 2	Run 3	Best Score
Gold medal	Kelly Sildaru (EST)	94.33	96.66	99.00	99.00
Silver medal	Sarah Hoefflin (SUI)	90.00	22.33	42.00	90.00
Bronze medal	Maggie Voisin (USA)	79.00	87.66	38.33	87.66
4	Johanne Killi (NOR)	84.00	21.33	4.00	84.00
5	Isabel Atkin (GBR)	58.33	81.66	83.33	83.33
6	Mathilde Gremaud (SUI)	75.00	58.00	16.66	75.00
7	Tess Ledeux (FRA)	25.66	29.00	17.00	29.00
8	Giulia Tanno (SUI)	20.00	4.33	21.33	21.33

==== Men's SlopeStyle results ====
Rank	Name	Run 1	Run 2	Run 3	Best Score
Gold medal	Alex Hall (USA)	86.00	94.33	95.66	95.66
Silver medal	Alex Beaulieu-Marchand (CAN)	92.66	86.33	17.33	92.66
Bronze medal	Ferdinand Dahl (NOR)	80.33	69.00	4.33	80.33
4	Henrik Harlaut (SWE)	78.33	42.66	33.66	78.33
5	Jesper Tjader (SWE)	14.33	15.00	77.66	77.66
6	Oystein Braaten (NOR)	77.00	28.00	32.33	77.00
7	Willie Borm (USA)	75.33	15.66	3.00	75.33
8	Nick Goepper (USA)	60.66	13.66	66.33	66.33
9	Phil Langevin (CAN)	59.33	41.66	5.00	59.33
10	James Woods (GBR)	43.66	37.33	12.66	43.66

==== Women's Big Air results ====
Rank	Name	Score
Gold medal	Mathilde Gremaud (SUI)	83.00
Silver medal	Johanne Killi (NOR)	80.00
Bronze medal	Kelly Sildaru (EST)	79.00
4	Tess Ledeux (FRA)	78.00
5	Sarah Hoefflin (SUI)	72.00
6	Giulia Tanno (SUI)	71.00
7	Elena Gaskell (CAN)	63.00
8	Maggie Voisin (USA)	44.00

==== Men's Big Air results ====
Rank	Name	Score
Gold medal	Birk Ruud (NOR)	89.00
Silver medal	Alex Beaulieu-Marchand (CAN)	87.00
Bronze medal	James Woods (GBR)	82.00
4	Evan McEachran (CAN)	81.00
5	Alex Hall (USA)	80.00
6	Henrik Harlaut (SWE)	77.00
7	Øystein Bråten (NOR)	74.00
8	Christian Nummedal (NOR)	64.00

=== Snowboarding ===
==== Special Olympics Unified Snowboarding Dual Slalom results ====
Rank	Name	
Gold medal	Henry Meece - Chris Klug (USA)	34.781
Silver medal	Scotty Lago - Juan Guentrutrsipai (CHI)	34.887
Bronze medal	Mike Schultz - Christopher Perdue (USA)	35.370

==== Women's SuperPipe results ====
Rank	Name	Run 1	Run 2	Run 3	Best Score
Gold medal	Chloe Kim (USA)	25.00	84.00	11.33	84.00
Silver medal	Queralt Castellet (ESP)	80.00	15.66	59.66	80.00
Bronze medal	Cai Xuetong (PRC)	3.00	27.33	72.66	72.66
4	Jiayu Liu (PRC)	52.33	65.00	69.66	69.66
5	Haruna Matsumoto (JPN)	64.33	67.00	6.66	67.00
6	Maddie Mastro (ITA)	6.66	63.33	16.66	63.33
7	Sena Tomita (JPN)	55.00	5.33	60.33	60.33
8	Arielle Gold (USA)	31.33	5.33	13.66	31.33

==== Men's SuperPipe results ====
Rank	Name	Run 1	Run 2	Run 3	Best Score
Gold medal	Scotty James (AUS)	18.33	94.00	2.33	94.00
Silver medal	Yuto Totsuka (JPN)	90.00	19.33	18.66	90.00
Bronze medal	Danny Davis (USA)	83.66	23.66	65.33	83.66
4	Chase Josey (USA)	37.66	79.33	82.66	82.66
5	Jake Pates (USA)	80.66	17.66	81.00	81.00
6	Ben Ferguson (USA)	66.66	75.33	79.33	79.33
7	Iouri Podladtchikov (SUI)	78.33	15.33	64.33	78.33
8	Toby Miller (USA)	68.33	21.66	34.00	68.33
9	Raibu Katayama (JPN)	18.66	53.33	52.33	53.33
10	Patrick Burgener (SUI)	34.33	38.33	28.66	38.33

==== Women's SlopeStyle results ====
Rank	Name	Run 1	Run 2	Run 3	Best Score
Gold medal	Zoi Sadowski-Synnott (NZL)	90.00	24.00	91.00	91.00
Silver medal	Hailey Langland (USA)	71.00	75.66	90.66	90.66
Bronze medal	Enni Rukajärvi (FIN)	84.66	28.66	28.66	84.66
4	Spencer O'Brien (CAN)	19.33	81.00	21.33	81.00
5	Silje Norendal (NOR)	80.00	77.33	11.66	80.00
6	Reira Iwabuchi (JPN)	20.00	73.33	22.33	73.33
7	Laurie Blouin (CAN)	16.33	65.33	21.00	65.33
8	Julia Marino (USA)	11.33	28.00	17.33	28.00

==== Men's SlopeStyle results ====
Rank	Name	Run 1	Run 2	Run 3	Best Score
Gold medal	Mark McMorris (CAN)	89.66	21.33	96.00	96.00
Silver medal	Rene Rinnekangas (FIN)	88.00	23.00	94.00	94.00
Bronze medal	Mons Røisland (NOR)	91.33	22.33	91.00	91.33
4	Sébastien Toutant (CAN)	28.00	25.00	90.66	90.66
5	Red Gerard (USA)	82.33	90.33	19.33	90.33
6	Darcy Sharpe (CAN)	66.00	10.00	87.00	87.00
7	Judd Henkes (USA)	85.33	23.00	26.33	85.33
8	Roope Tonteri (FIN)	15.00	68.00	21.33	68.00
9	Michael Ciccarelli (CAN)	22.33	57.66	23.00	57.66
10	Sven Thorgren (SWE)	28.66	25.33	20.00	28.66

==== Women's Big Air results ====
Rank	Name	Score		
Gold medal	Laurie Blouin (CAN)	42.00	35.00	77.00
Silver medal	Zoi Sadowski-Synnott (NZL)	42.00	35.00	77.00
Bronze medal	Jamie Anderson (USA)	26.00	41.00	67.00
4	Enni Rukajarvi (FIN)	25.00	31.00	56.00
5	Yuka Fujimori (JPN)	21.00	24.00	45.00
6	Klaudia Medlova (SVK)	21.00	15.00	36.00
7	Hailey Langland (USA)	15.00	12.00	27.00

==== Men's Big Air results ====
Rank	Name	Score		
Gold medal	Takeru Otsuka (JPN)	43.00	45.00	88.00
Silver medal	Mark McMorris (CAN)	42.00	43.00	85.00
Bronze medal	Sven Thorgren (SWE)	39.00	37.00	76.00
4	Sebastien Toutant (CAN)	38.00	35.00	73.00
5	Rene Rinnekangas (FIN)	31.00	33.00	64.00
6	Chris Corning (USA)	32.00	28.00	60.00
7	Darcy Sharpe (CAN)	20.00	14.00	34.00
8	Sebbe De Buck (BEL)	10.00	16.00	26.00

==== Men's Knuckle Huck results ====
Rank	Name	Score
Gold medal	Fridtjof Sæther Tischendorf (NOR)	100.00

=== Snowmobiling / BikeCross ===
==== Snowmobile Freestyle results ====
Rank	Name	Run 1	Run 2	Best Score
Gold medal	Daniel Bodin (SWE)	88.33	91.66	91.66
Silver medal	Brett Turcotte (CAN)	90.66	90.66	90.66
Bronze medal	Justin Hoyer (USA)	86.00	87.33	87.33
4	Joe Parsons (USA)	86.33	81.00	86.33
5	Rasmus Johansson (SWE)	85.00	66.00	85.00
6	Heath Frisby (USA)	84.66	82.66	84.66
7	Willie Elam (USA)	78.66	82.66	82.66
8	Josh Penner (CAN)	76.33	73.00	76.33

==== BikeCross results ====
Rank	Name	Time
Gold medal	Cody Matechuk (CAN)	10:31.387
Silver medal	Jesse Kirchmeyer (USA)	10:35.832
Bronze medal	Brock Hoyer (CAN)	10:37.153
4	Darrin Mees (USA)	10:38.332
5	Seth Fischer (USA)	10:40.992
6	Josh Hill (USA)	10:44.485
7	Harris Huizenga (USA)	10:47.918
8	Axell Hodges (USA)	10:57.364
9	Mark Wilson (USA)	11:11.985
10	Jimmy Jarrett (USA)	+1 Lap

==== Adaptive BikeCross results ====
Rank	Name	Time
Gold medal	Mike Schultz (USA)	5:07:241
Silver medal	Tyler Brandenburger (USA)	-22.211
Bronze medal	Kevin Royston (USA)	-26.226
4	Pablo Gimenez (ESP)	-45.027
5	Ryan Suchanek (USA)	1 Lap
6	Kolleen Conger (USA)	1 Lap
7	Eugene Poplawski (USA)	1 Lap

==== Snow Bike Best Trick ====
Rank	Name	Run 1	Run 2	Best Score
Gold medal	Rob Adelberg (AUS)	91.00	81.66	91.00
Silver medal	Brett Turcotte (CAN)	89.66	-	89.66
Bronze medal	Ethen Roberts (USA)	64.66	89.00	89.00
4	Morgan Kaliszuk (CAN)	79.66	85.33	85.33
5	Robert Haslam (USA)	81.66	79.66	81.66
6	Kyle Demelo (CAN)	61.33	70.33	70.33

==== Snow Bike Hill Climb ====
Rank	Name
Gold medal	Logan Mead (USA)
Silver medal	Travis Whitlock (USA)
Bronze medal	Jake Anstett (USA)
4	Austin Cardwell (USA)

==== Para BikeCross ====
Rank	Name	Time
Gold medal	Doug Henry	4:57.599
Silver medal	Will Posey	-19.051
Bronze medal	Leighton Lillie	One lap
4	Jonathan Stark	One lap
5	Paul Thacker	One lap
6	Danny Baird	One lap
7	Blair Morgan	One lap
8	David Trujillo	One lap

Ref
