= Winter X Games XXVIII =

2024 Winter X Games results

- Venue: Buttermilk Ski Resort
- Location: Aspen, United States
- Dates: 26–28 January 2024

Winter X Games XXVIII was held from 26 to 28 January 2024, in Aspen, Colorado, United States.

Participating athletes competed in eight skiing events and eight snowboarding events.

== Medal table ==
* Host nation (United States)

Rank	Nation	Gold	Silver	Bronze	Total
1	United States (USA)*	5	4	3	12
2	Japan (JPN)	3	5	2	10
3	Canada (CAN)	2	1	2	5
4	France (FRA)	2	0	0	2
5	Great Britain (GBR)	1	1	0	2
6	Norway (NOR)	1	0	2	3
7	China (CHN)	1	0	1	2
8	Australia (AUS)	1	0	0	1
9	Switzerland (SUI)	0	1	2	3
10	Sweden (SWE)	0	1	1	2
11	Germany (GER)	0	1	0	1
11	New Zealand (NZL)	0	1	0	1
11	Russia (RUS)	0	1	0	1
14	Austria (AUT)	0	0	2	2
15	Colombia (COL)	0	0	1	1
Totals (15 entries)		16	16	16	48

== Medal summary ==
=== Snowboard ===
Event	Gold	Silver	Bronze
Men's Slopestyle	Red Gerard; United States	Mark McMorris; Canada	Mons Røisland; Norway
Men's SuperPipe	Scotty James; Australia	Ruka Hirano; Japan	Kaishu Hirano; Japan
Men's Big Air	Taiga Hasegawa; Japan	Hiroaki Kunitake; Japan	Mons Røisland; Norway
Men's Knuckle Huck	Liam Brearley; Canada	Zeb Powell; United States	Darcy Sharpe; Canada
Women's Slopestyle	Mia Brookes; Great Britain	Kokomo Murase; Japan	Reira Iwabuchi; Japan
Women's SuperPipe	Chloe Kim; United States	Mitsuki Ono; Japan	Cai Xuetong; China
Women's Big Air	Kokomo Murase; Japan	Reira Iwabuchi; Japan	Anna Gasser; Austria
Women's Knuckle Huck	Kokomo Murase; Japan	Annika Morgan; Germany	Egan Wint; Colombia

=== Ski ===
Event	Gold	Silver	Bronze
Men's Slopestyle	Birk Ruud; Norway	Alex Hall; United States	Mac Forehand; United States
Men's SuperPipe	Alex Ferreira; United States	Nico Porteous; New Zealand	Hunter Hess; United States
Men's Big Air	Troy Podmilsak; United States	Alex Hall; United States	Daniel Bacher; Austria
Men's Knuckle Huck	Colby Stevenson; United States	Henrik Harlaut; Sweden	Jesper Tjäder; Sweden
Women's Slopestyle	Tess Ledeux; France	Mathilde Gremaud; Switzerland	Giulia Tanno; Switzerland
Women's SuperPipe	Eileen Gu; China	Zoe Atkin; Great Britain	Amy Fraser; Canada
Women's Big Air	Tess Ledeux; France	Anastasia Tatalina; Russia	Rell Harwood; United States
Women's Knuckle Huck	Olivia Asselin; Canada	Rell Harwood; United States	Sarah Hoefflin; Switzerland
