= Kelly Sildaru =

Estonian freestyle skier (born 2002)

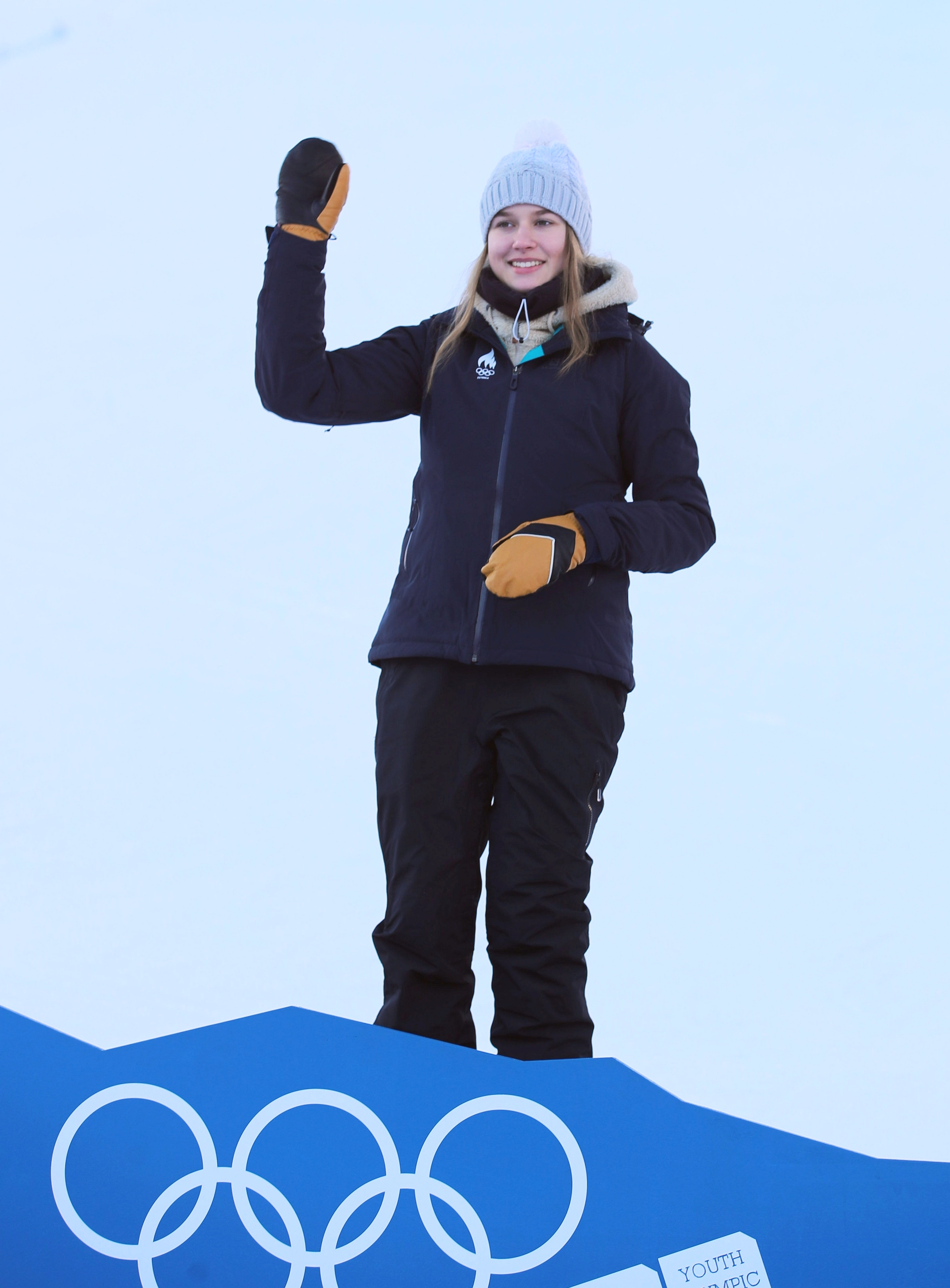
- Sildaru during the Winter Youth Olympics in Lausanne, Switzerland, in January 2020

Personal information
- Nationality: Estonia
- Born: 17 February 2002 (age 24) Tallinn, Estonia
- Height: 5 ft 5 in (165 cm)

Sport
- Sport: Skiing

World Cup career
- Seasons: 5 - (2017–2019, 2020–present)
- Indiv. starts: 15
- Indiv. podiums: 13
- Indiv. wins: 6
- Overall titles: 0
- Discipline titles: 1 – (1 SS)
Medal record
Women's freestyle skiing
Representing Estonia
International freestyle ski competitions
Event	1st	2nd	3rd
Olympic Games	0	0	1
World Championships	1	0	0
Winter X Games	5	2	1
Winter X Games Europe	0	1	0
Winter Dew Tour	4	1	0
Winter Youth Olympics	1	0	0
Junior World Championships	6	1	0
Total	17	5	2
Event	1st	2nd	3rd
Slopestyle	11	0	1
Halfpipe / Superpipe	4	2	0
Big air	1	3	1
Streetstyle	1	0	0
Total	17	5	2
World Cup race podiums
Event	1st	2nd	3rd
Slopestyle	5	1	0
Halfpipe	1	3	2
Big air	0	0	1
Total	6	4	3
Olympic Games
Bronze medal – third place	2022 Beijing	Slopestyle
World Championships
Gold medal – first place	2019 Utah	Halfpipe
Winter X Games
Gold medal – first place	2016 Aspen	Slopestyle
Gold medal – first place	2017 Aspen	Slopestyle
Gold medal – first place	2019 Aspen	Slopestyle
Gold medal – first place	2020 Aspen	Slopestyle
Gold medal – first place	2020 Aspen	Superpipe
Gold medal – first place	2022 Aspen	Superpipe
Silver medal – second place	2017 Aspen	Big air
Silver medal – second place	2019 Aspen	Superpipe
Bronze medal – third place	2019 Aspen	Big air
Winter X Games Europe
Silver medal – second place	2017 Hafjell	Big air
Winter Dew Tour
Gold medal – first place	2015 Breckenridge	Slopestyle
Gold medal – first place	2016 Breckenridge	Slopestyle
Gold medal – first place	2018 Breckenridge	Slopestyle
Gold medal – first place	2021 Copper Mountain	Streetstyle
Silver medal – second place	2021 Copper Mountain	Superpipe
Winter Youth Olympics
Gold medal – first place	2020 Lausanne	Slopestyle
Junior World Championships
Gold medal – first place	2017 Crans-Montana	Halfpipe
Gold medal – first place	2017 Chiesa in Valmalenco	Slopestyle
Gold medal – first place	2018 Cardrona	Halfpipe
Gold medal – first place	2018 Cardrona	Slopestyle
Gold medal – first place	2019 Kläppen	Slopestyle
Gold medal – first place	2019 Kläppen	Big air
Silver medal – second place	2018 Cardrona	Big air

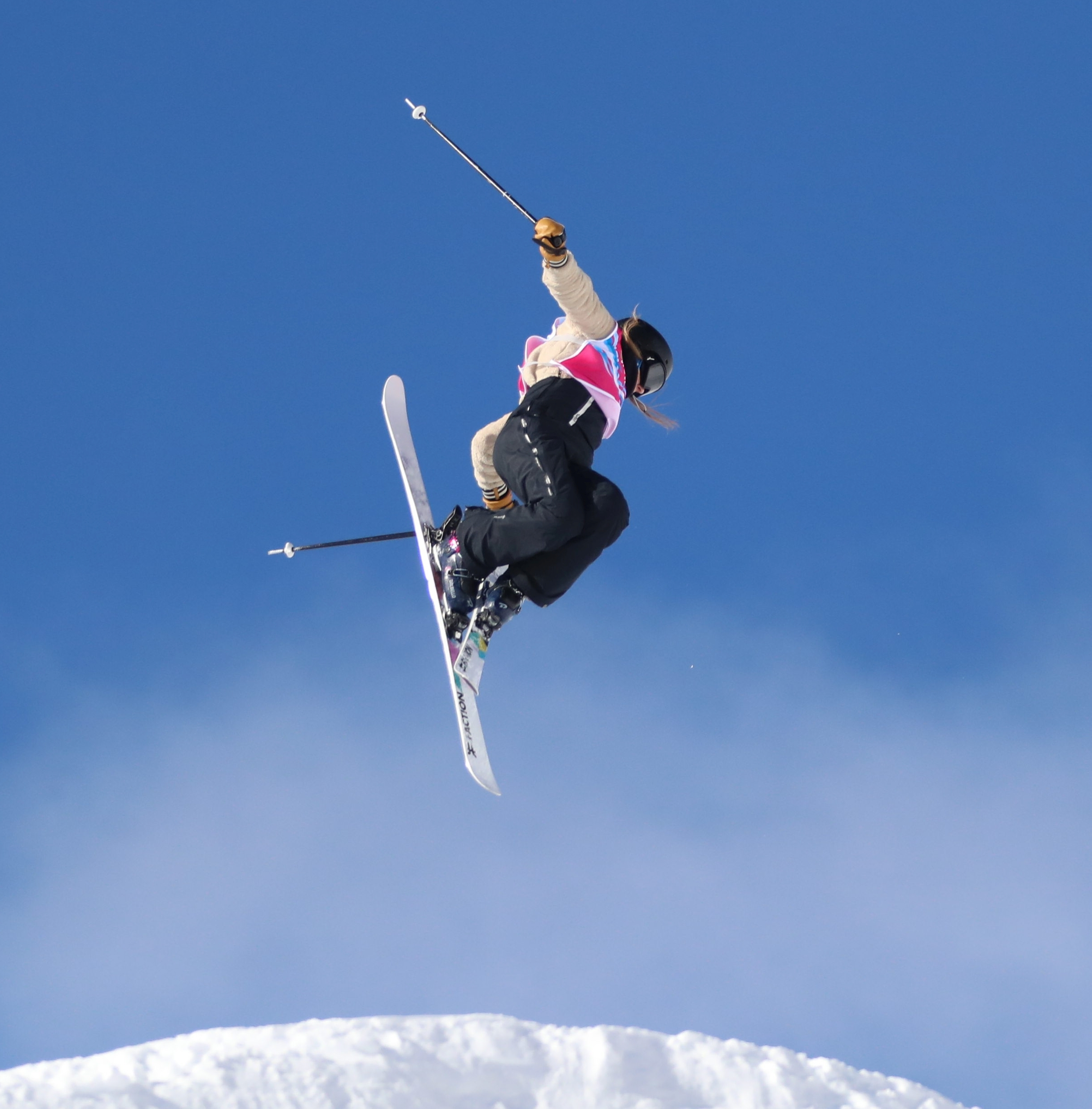
Kelly Sildaru during the qualification for the girls' slopestyle at the 2020 Winter Youth Olympics

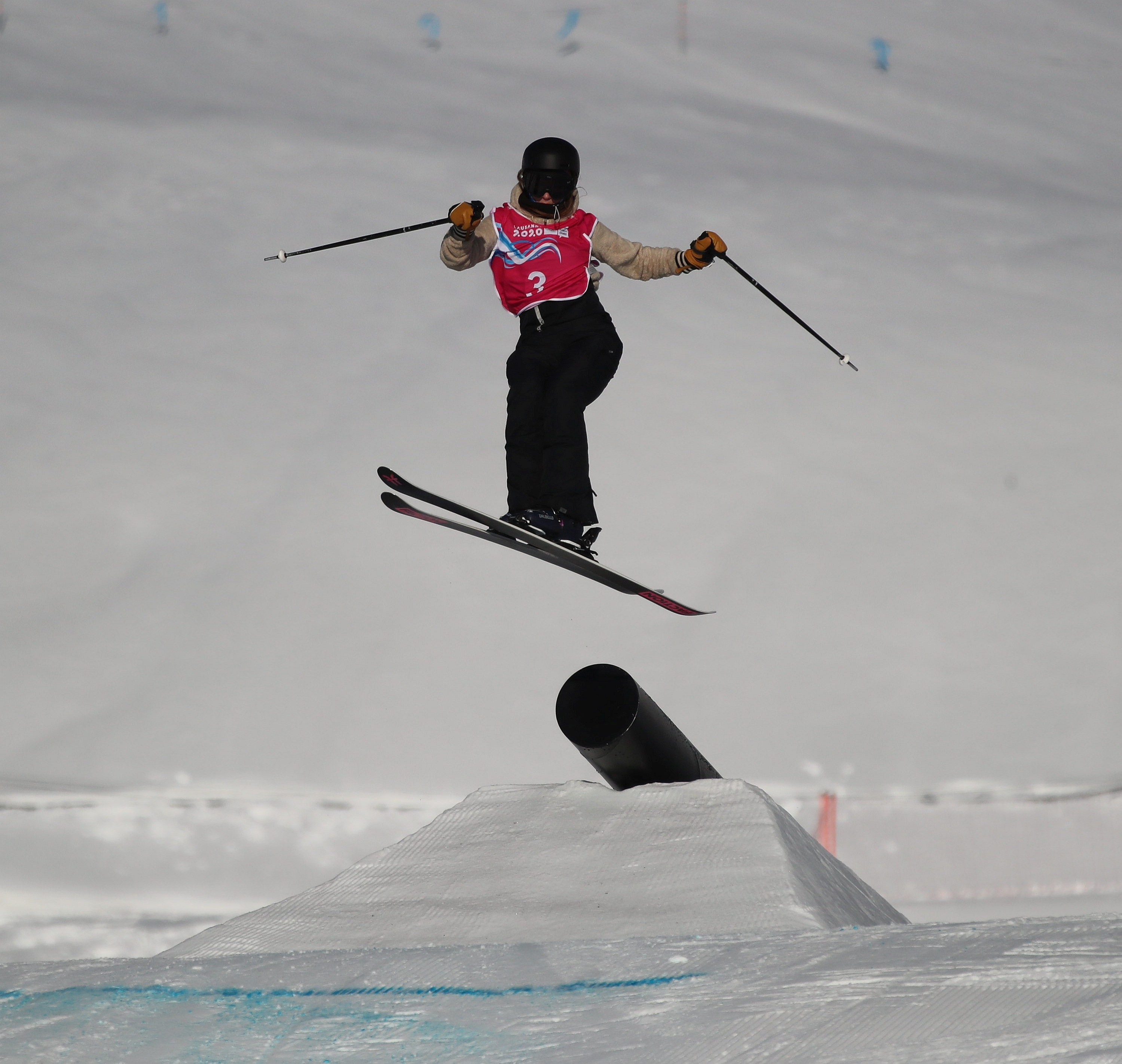
During the final at the very same place

Kelly Sildaru (Estonian pronunciation: [ˈkelʲˑi ˈsilˑdɑ.ru]; born 17 February 2002) is an Estonian Olympic freestyle skier.

== Career ==
Sildaru won a gold medal in the slopestyle event in the 2016 Winter X Games beating Tiril Sjåstad Christiansen. With this win, at age 13, Sildaru became the youngest gold medalist to date at a Winter X Games event and the first person to win a Winter X Games medal for Estonia. She is also the youngest to win two X Games gold medals. Sildaru has won the women's slopestyle on the 2015 and 2016 Dew Tour.

During the Big Air competition of the 2017 Winter X Games Norway, Sildaru became the first woman ever to land a Switch 1260° Mute and a 1440° during a competition. Because of her young age, the first World Cup event she was allowed to participate in was on 27 August 2017 in Cardrona, New Zealand. She won the slopestyle competition.

Despite being the gold medal favorite for the women’s slopestyle event in 2018 Winter Olympics, she missed competing in the Games because of a knee injury. However she later recovered and was able to compete in the world championships winning gold in halfpipe. In the 2020 Youth Olympic Games she won a gold medal for the Women's Freestyle Skiing.

During the 2022 Beijing Winter Olympics, she won a bronze medal in the slopestyle event with her top score of 82.06 in her first run.

Sildaru has been named the female Estonian Athlete of the Year twice (2019, 2022), and is the recipient of a high Estonian state award, the Order of the White Star, 3rd class.

At the 2026 Winter Olympics, Sildaru placed 13th in halfpipe qualifiers.

== Personal life ==
Sildaru's younger brother, Henry Sildaru, is also an Olympic freestyle skier.

== Freestyle skiing results ==
All results are sourced from the International Ski Federation (FIS).

=== Olympic Games ===
- 1 medal – (1 bronze)

Year	Age	Slopestyle	Halfpipe	Big air
(South Korea) 2018 Pyeongchang	15	injured: did not compete		
(China) 2022 Beijing	19	Bronze	4	17
(Italy) 2026 Milano Cortina	23	–	13	–

==== Winter Youth Olympics ====
- 1 medal – (1 gold)

Year	Age	Slopestyle	Halfpipe	Big air
(Switzerland) 2020 Lausanne	17	Gold	—	—

=== World Championships ===
- 1 medal – (1 gold)

Year	Age	Slopestyle	Halfpipe	Big air
(United States) 2019 Park City	16	CNX	Gold	—
(United States) 2021 Aspen	18	injured: did not compete		
(Georgia (country)) 2023 Bakuriani	20	injured: did not compete		

==== Junior World Championships ====
- 7 medals – (6 gold, 1 silver)

Year	Age	Slopestyle	Halfpipe	Big air
(Switzerland) (Italy) 2017	14	Gold	Gold	—N/a
(New Zealand) (Sweden) 2018	15	Gold	Gold	Silver
(Sweden) (New Zealand) 2019	16	Gold	—	Gold

=== Winter X Games ===
- 9 medals – (6 gold, 2 silver, 1 bronze)

Year	Age	Slopestyle	Superpipe	Big air
(United States) 2016 Aspen	13	Gold	—	—
(United States) 2017 Aspen	14	Gold	—	Silver
(United States) 2018 Aspen	15	injured: did not compete		
(United States) 2019 Aspen	16	Gold	Silver	Bronze
(United States) 2020 Aspen	17	Gold	Gold	4
(United States) 2021 Aspen	18	injured: did not compete		
(United States) 2022 Aspen	19	—	Gold	—
(United States) 2023 Aspen	20	injured: did not compete		

==== Winter X Games Europe ====
- 1 medal – (1 silver)

Year	Age	Slopestyle	Superpipe	Big air
(Norway) 2016 Oslo	14	—N/a	—	4
(Norway) 2017 Hafjell	15	—	—N/a	Silver

=== World Cup results ===
Sildaru ended the 2021-2022 World Cup season by winning the FIS World Cup slopestyle title and taking home her first crystal globe.

==== Season standings ====
Season	Age	Overall	Slopestyle	Halfpipe	Big air
2017–18	15	94	21	18	—
2018–19	16	29	10	4	—
2019–20	17	did not compete			
2020–21	18	12	19	—	3rd place, bronze medalist(s)
2021–22	19	2nd place, silver medalist(s)	1st place, gold medalist(s)	6	16
2022–23	20	19	14	15	—
2023–24	21	injured: did not compete			

Standings through 17 January 2024

==== Race Podiums ====
- 6 wins – (5 SS, 1 HP)
- 13 podiums – (6 SS, 6 HP, 1 BA)

No.	Season	Date	Location	Discipline	Place
1	2017–18	27 August 2017	Cardrona, New Zealand	Slopestyle	1st
2	2017–18	1 September 2017	Cardrona, New Zealand	Halfpipe	2nd
3	2018–19	23 November 2018	Stubai, Austria	Slopestyle	1st
4	2018–19	7 December 2018	(United States) Copper Mountain, USA	Halfpipe	1st
5	2018–19	9 March 2019	(United States) Mammoth, USA	Halfpipe	2nd
6	2020–21	8 January 2021	Kreischberg, Austria	Big air	3rd
7	2021–22	20 November 2021	Stubai, Austria	Slopestyle	1st
8	2021–22	10 December 2021	(United States) Copper Mountain, USA	Halfpipe	3rd
9	2021–22	8 January 2022	(United States) Mammoth, USA	Halfpipe	2nd
10	2021–22	9 January 2022	(United States) Mammoth, USA	Slopestyle	1st
11	2021–22	26 March 2022	Silvaplana, Switzerland	Slopestyle	1st
12	2022–23	19 November 2022	Stubai, Austria	Slopestyle	2nd
13	2022–23	17 December 2022	(United States) Copper Mountain, USA	Halfpipe	3rd

== Trivia ==
Sildaru was honored with a one-of-a-kind Kelly Sildaru Barbie doll on 25 May 2022 as part of Barbie's Dream Gap project.

Awards
Preceded by Anett Kontaveit	Estonian Young Athlete of the Year; 2016–2020	Succeeded by Eneli Jefimova
Preceded by Saskia Alusalu Katrina Lehis	Estonian Female Athlete of the Year; 2019 2022	Succeeded by Ott Tänak & Martin Järveoja (Athlete of the Year); Incumbent
