= Rell Harwood =

American freestyle skier

Personal information
- Born: June 1, 2001 (age 25) Park City, Utah
- Education: University of Utah
- Height: 5 ft 1 in (155 cm)

Sport
- Country: United States
- Sport: Freestyle skiing
- Events: Slopestyle, Big air
Medal record
Winter X Games
Gold medal – first place	2025 Aspen	Knuckle Huck
Silver medal – second place	2024 Aspen	Knuckle Huck
Bronze medal – third place	2024 Aspen	Big Air

Rell Harwood (born June 1, 2001) is an American freestyle skier who specializes in slopestyle and big air.

== Early life and education ==
Harwood was raised in Park City, Utah. She began skiing when she was three years old. Her name was inspired by surfer Rell Sunn. Harwood attended the University of Utah, graduating in 2026.

== Career ==
Harwood has been a member of the United States Ski Team since 2018.

At the 2024 Winter X Games in Aspen, Colorado, Harwood placed second in women's knuckle huck, third in women's big air, and fourth in women's slopestyle.

At the 2025 Winter X Games in Aspen, Harwood placed first in women's knuckle huck, fourth in women's big air, and seventh in women's slopestyle.

Harwood competed in the 2026 Winter Olympics in Milan, despite having torn her ACL two months prior to the games. She finished twenty third in women's big air.
