= Winter X Games XXIV =

2020 extreme sports tournament

X Games Aspen 2020
- Venue: Buttermilk Ski Resort
- Location: Aspen, United States
- Dates: 22–26 January 2020

X Games Aspen 2020 were held from January 22 to January 26, 2020 in Aspen, Colorado, United States.

== Medal table ==
* Host nation (United States)

| Rank | Nation | Gold | Silver | Bronze | Total |
|---|---|---|---|---|---|
| 1 | United States (USA)* | 9 | 4 | 7 | 20 |
| 2 | Canada (CAN) | 5 | 7 | 2 | 14 |
| 3 | Estonia (EST) | 2 | 0 | 0 | 2 |
| 4 | Japan (JPN) | 1 | 3 | 3 | 7 |
| 5 | Sweden (SWE) | 1 | 1 | 2 | 4 |
| 6 | Australia (AUS) | 1 | 0 | 1 | 2 |
| 7 | France (FRA) | 1 | 0 | 0 | 1 |
| 7 | Spain (ESP) | 1 | 0 | 0 | 1 |
| 9 | Switzerland (SUI) | 0 | 2 | 4 | 6 |
| 10 | Norway (NOR) | 0 | 2 | 0 | 2 |
| Totals (10 entries) | | 21 | 19 | 19 | 59 |

- Not including Special Olympics

== Results ==
=== Skiing ===
| Event | Gold | Silver | Bronze |
|---|---|---|---|
| Men's Big Air | Henrik Harlaut; Sweden | Birk Ruud; Norway | Andri Ragettli; Switzerland |
| Men's Slopestyle | Colby Stevenson; United States | Evan McEachran; Canada | Fabian Bösch; Switzerland |
| Men's SuperPipe | Alex Ferreira; United States | Aaron Blunck; United States | Brendan Mackay; Canada |
| Men's SuperPipe Session | Taylor Gold; United States | Jake Pates; United States | Toby Miller; United States |
| Men's Knuckle Huck | Colby Stevenson; United States | Only gold awarded | |
| Women's Big Air | Tess Ledeux; France | Mathilde Gremaud; Switzerland | Sarah Höfflin; Switzerland |
| Women's Slopestyle | Kelly Sildaru; Estonia | Sarah Höfflin; Switzerland | Maggie Voisin; United States |
| Women's SuperPipe | Kelly Sildaru; Estonia | Rachael Karker; Canada | Cassie Sharpe; Canada |
| Special Olympics Unified Skiing | Gus Kenworthy (GBR); Palmer Lyons (USA) | Alex Ferreira (USA); Haldan Pranger (USA) | Sarah Höfflin (SUI); Kohlor Von Eschen (USA) |

=== Snowboarding ===
| Event | Gold | Silver | Bronze |
|---|---|---|---|
| Men's Big Air | Maxence Parrot; Canada | Mark McMorris; Canada | Sven Thorgren; Sweden |
| Men's Slopestyle | Darcy Sharpe; Canada | Mons Røisland; Norway | Redmond Gerard; United States |
| Men's SuperPipe | Scotty James; Australia | Yuto Totsuka; Japan | Jan Scherrer; Switzerland |
| Men's Rail Jam | Jesse Paul; United States | Darcy Sharpe; Canada | Sven Thorgren; Sweden |
| Men's Knuckle Huck | Zeb Powell; United States | Only gold awarded | |
| Women's Big Air | Miyabi Onitsuka; Japan | Kokomo Murase; Japan | Reira Iwabuchi; Japan |
| Women's Slopestyle | Jamie Anderson; United States | Laurie Blouin; Canada | Kokomo Murase; Japan |
| Women's SuperPipe | Queralt Castellet; Spain | Kurumi Imai; Japan | Haruna Matsumoto; Japan |
| Special Olympics Unified Snowboarding | Mike Schultz (USA); Daina Shilts (USA) | Danny Davis (USA); Dmitrii Tiufiakov (RUS) | Jack Mitrani (USA); Henry Meece (USA) |

=== Snowmobiling / BikeCross ===
| Event | Gold | Silver | Bronze |
|---|---|---|---|
| Adaptive Snow BikeCross | Mike Schultz; United States | Kevin Royston; United States | Kolleen Conger; United States |
| Snow BikeCross | Cody Matechuk; Canada | Yannick Boucher; Canada | Jesse Kirchmeyer; United States |
| Para Snow BikeCross | Doug Henry; United States | Brandon Dudley; United States | Leighton Lillie; United States |
| Snow Bike Best Trick | Brett Turcotte; Canada | Morgan Kaliszuk; Canada | Jackson Strong; Australia |
| Snowmobile Freestyle | Brandon Cormier; Canada | Daniel Bodin; Sweden | Willie Elam; United States |

Ref
