= Kokomo Murase =

Japanese snowboarder (born 2004)

Personal information
- Born: 7 November 2004 (age 21) Gifu, Japan

Sport
- Country: Japan
- Sport: Snowboarding
- Events: Slopestyle, Big air
Medal record
Women's Snowboarding
Representing Japan
Olympic Games
Gold medal – first place	2026 Milano Cortina	Big air
Bronze medal – third place	2022 Beijing	Big air
Bronze medal – third place	2026 Milano Cortina	Slopestyle
World Championships
Gold medal – first place	2025 Engadin	Big air
Silver medal – second place	2025 Engadin	Slopestyle
Winter X Games
Gold medal – first place	2018 Norway	Big Air
Silver medal – second place	2019 Norway	Big Air
Silver medal – second place	2020 Aspen	Big Air
Silver medal – second place	2020 Norway	Slopestyle
Bronze medal – third place	2020 Aspen	Slopestyle
Bronze medal – third place	2023 Aspen	Slopestyle
Gold medal – first place	2024 Aspen	Big Air
Gold medal – first place	2024 Aspen	Knuckle Huck
Silver medal – second place	2024 Aspen	Slopestyle
Silver medal – second place	2025 Aspen	Slopestyle
Gold medal – first place	2025 Aspen	Knuckle Huck
Bronze medal – third place	2026 Aspen	Slopestyle
Silver medal – second place	2026 Aspen	Knuckle Huck
Gold medal – first place	2026 Aspen	Big Air

Kokomo Murase (Japanese: 村瀬心椛; born 7 November 2004) is a Japanese snowboarder who competes in the slopestyle and big air events. She competed in the women's slopestyle event at the 2022 Winter Olympics and won the gold medal in the big air event at the 2026 Winter Olympics. She also won the overall title in the slopestyle and freestyle at the 2021–22 FIS Snowboard World Cup.

== Career ==
Murase's gold medal win in Big Air at the 2018 Winter X Games in Norway made her the youngest athlete to win gold in big air at the Winter X Games.

== Major results ==
=== Olympic Games ===
Event	Slopestyle	Big Air
2022 Beijing	10th	Bronze
2026 Milano Cortina	Bronze	Gold

=== World Championships ===
Event	Slopestyle	Big Air
2021 Aspen	5th	6th

=== World Cup ===
Season	Freestyle overall		Slopestyle		Big Air	
Season	Points	Position	Points	Position	Points	Position
2019–20	1470	23rd	220	29th	1250	7th
2020–21	246	2nd	166	2nd	80	2nd
2021–22	456	1st	320	1st	136	2nd
2022–23	211	9th	29	4th	182	2nd
2023–24	425	1st	225	1st	200	4th

=== World cup podiums ===
Season	Date	Location	Discipline	Place
2019–20	20 December 2019	Atlanta, United States	Big Air	2nd
2020–21	9 January 2021	Kreischberg, Austria	Big Air	2nd
2020–21	28 March 2021	Silvaplana, Switzerland	Slopestyle	2nd
2021–22	23 October 2021	Chur, Switzerland	Big Air	1st
2021–22	1 January 2022	Calgary, Canada	Slopestyle	1st
2021–22	8 January 2022	Mammoth Mountain, United States	Slopestyle	3rd
2021–22	19 March 2022	Špindlerův Mlýn, Czech Republic	Slopestyle	1st
2021–22	27 March 2022	Silvaplana, Switzerland	Slopestyle	3rd
2022–23	14 January 2023	Kreischberg, Austria	Big Air	3rd
2023–24	21 October 2023	Chur, Switzerland	Big Air	1st
2023–24	15 December 2023	Copper Mountain, United States	Big Air	1st
2023–24	15 March 2024	Tignes, France	Slopestyle	1st
2023–24	23 March 2024	Silvaplana, Switzerland	Slopestyle	2nd
2024–25	2 September 2024	Cardrona, New Zealand	Slopestyle	1st
