= Johanne Killi =

Norwegian freestyle skier

Personal information
- Born: 13 October 1997 (age 28) Dombås, Norway

Sport
- Country: Norway
- Sport: Freestyle skiing
- Events: Slopestyle, Big air
- Club: Dombås Idrettslag
Medal record
Women's freestyle skiing
Representing Norway
World Championships
Bronze medal – third place	2023 Bakuriani	Slopestyle
Winter X Games
Gold medal – first place	2017 Norway	Slopestyle
Silver medal – second place	2016 Oslo	Big Air
Silver medal – second place	2018 Aspen	Big Air
Silver medal – second place	2019 Aspen	Big Air
Bronze medal – third place	2016 Aspen	Slopestyle
Bronze medal – third place	2017 Aspen	Slopestyle
Bronze medal – third place	2020 Norway	Big Air

Johanne Killi (born 13 October 1997) is a Norwegian freestyle skier who won a bronze medal in slopestyle at Winter X Games and Tinestafetten XX.

She announced her retirement in 2023.
