= Jessica Rich =

Jessica Rich may refer to:

- Jessica Rich (designer) (born 1984), American fashion designer
- Jessica Rich (snowboarder) (born 1990), Australian snowboarder
