= Jess Perlmutter =

American snowboarder (born 2009)

Personal information
- Born: December 2, 2009 (age 16) Millburn, New Jersey, U.S.

Sport
- Country: United States
- Sport: Snowboarding
Medal record
Women's snowboarding
Representing the United States
Winter X Games
Gold medal – first place	2026 Aspen	Knuckle huck

Jessica Perlmutter (born 2009) is an American snowboarder. She represented the United States at the 2026 Winter Olympics.

== Career ==
Perlmutter competed at the 2026 Winter X Games and won a gold medal in the knuckle huck. In January 2026, she was selected to represent the United States at the 2026 Winter Olympics at 16 years old. She competed in the big air event and didn't advance to the finals. She then competed in the slopestyle event and finished in sixth place with a score of 68.18.
