= Winter X Games XXII =

2018 extreme sports tournament

Winter X Games XXII (Winter X Games Twenty-Two)
- Location: (United States) Aspen, Colorado
- Dates: January 25–28

Winter X Games XXII (re-titled Winter X Games Aspen '18; styled as Winter X Games Twenty-Two in the official logo) were held from January 25 to January 28, 2018, in Aspen, Colorado. They were the 17th consecutive Winter X Games held in Aspen. The events were broadcast on ESPN.

Participating athletes competed in six skiing events, seven snowboarding events, two snowmobiling events and two snow bike events.

== Results ==
=== Medal count ===
* Host nation (United States)

Rank	Nation	Gold	Silver	Bronze	Total
1	United States (USA)*	7	8	9	24
2	Canada (CAN)	4	2	2	8
3	Sweden (SWE)	2	0	1	3
4	Norway (NOR)	1	4	1	6
5	Australia (AUS)	1	2	0	3
6	Japan (JPN)	1	1	1	3
7	Switzerland (SUI)	1	0	1	2
8	Austria (AUT)	1	0	0	1
9	Great Britain (GBR)	0	1	1	2
10	Finland (FIN)	0	0	1	1
10	France (FRA)	0	0	1	1
Totals (11 entries)		18	18	18	54

=== Skiing ===
==== Women's SuperPipe results ====
Rank	Name	Run 1	Run 2	Run 3	Best Score
Gold medal	Maddie Bowman (USA)	84.33	92.00	26.33	92.00
Silver medal	Brita Sigourney (USA)	88.66	90.33	80.00	90.33
Bronze medal	Cassie Sharpe (CAN)	30.00	76.66	88.66	88.66
4	Marie Martinod (FRA)	26.66	87.33	30.33	87.33
5	Devin Logan (USA)	28.00	82.33	28.33	82.33
6	Ayana Onozuka (JPN)	80.33	28.33	25.66	80.33
7	Sabrina Cakmakli (GER)	20.33	68.00	40.00	68.00
8	Annalisa Drew (USA)	25.66	18.66	51.33	51.33

==== Men's SuperPipe results ====
Rank	Name	Run 1	Run 2	Run 3	Best Score
Gold medal	David Wise (USA)	90.66	79.00	94.00	94.00
Silver medal	Alex Ferreira (USA)	71.66	76.00	91.33	91.33
Bronze medal	Torin Yater-Wallace (USA)	86.66	43.66	30.00	86.66
4	Mike Riddle (CAN)	80.33	29.66	84.66	84.66
5	Taylor Seaton (USA)	76.33	83.00	79.00	83.00
6	Noah Bowman (CAN)	73.00	82.00	82.33	82.33
7	Simon d'Artois (CAN)	56.33	40.66	10.33	56.33
8	Aaron Blunck (USA)	41.33	31.66	-	41.33
9	Kevin Rolland (FRA)	25.00	38.66	22.33	38.66
10	Miguel Porteous (NZL)	6.33	26.00	19.33	26.00

==== Women's SlopeStyle results ====
Rank	Name	Run 1	Run 2	Run 3	Best Score
Gold medal	Maggie Voisin (USA)	92.33	14.00	42.00	92.33
Silver medal	Isabel Atkin (GBR)	88.00	54.00	68.66	88.00
Bronze medal	Jennie-Lee Burmansson (SWE)	83.66	28.33	85.00	85.00
4	Sarah Hoefflin (SUI)	60.66	81.66	83.33	83.33
5	Emma Dahlström (SWE)	9.66	80.00	70.33	80.00
6	Devin Logan (USA)	73.00	78.33	17.66	78.33
7	Johanne Killi (NOR)	77.00	54.00	30.00	77.00
8	Tess Ledeux (FRA)	70.00	37.00	30.00	70.00

==== Men's Big Air results ====
Rank	Name	Score
Gold medal	Henrik Harlaut (SWE)	86.00
Silver medal	Oystein Braaten (NOR)	84.00
Bronze medal	James Woods (GBR)	82.00
4	Fabian Bösch (SUI)	80.00
5	Christian Nummedal (NOR)	70.00
6	Birk Ruud (NOR)	70.00
7	Kai Mahler (SUI)	68.00
8	Eirik Sæterøy (NOR)	60.00

==== Women's Big Air results ====
Rank	Name	Score
Gold medal	Sarah Hoefflin (SUI)	86.00
Silver medal	Johanne Killi (NOR)	79.00
Bronze medal	Tess Ledeux (FRA)	71.00
4	Dominique Ohaco (CHI)	54.00

==== Men's SlopeStyle results ====
Rank	Name	Run 1	Run 2	Run 3	Best Score
Gold medal	Henrik Harlaut (SWE)	93.00	52.00	90.00	93.00
Silver medal	Øystein Bråten (NOR)	47.66	90.66	92.33	92.33
Bronze medal	Andri Ragettli (SUI)	66.66	89.00	92.00	92.00
4	James Woods (GBR)	24.00	91.33	40.66	91.33
5	Alex Beaulieu-Marchand (CAN)	67.66	43.33	91.00	91.00
6	Gus Kenworthy (USA)	55.66	90.00	84.00	90.00
7	Nick Goepper (USA)	60.00	16.66	86.33	86.33
8	Oscar Wester (SWE)	79.66	84.66	26.66	84.66

=== Snowboarding ===
==== Special Olympics Unified Snowboarding Dual Slalom results ====
Rank	Name
Gold medal	Henry Meece (USA) / Chris Klug (USA)
Silver medal	Daina Shilts (USA) / Hannah Teter (USA)
Bronze medal	Denisa Trmalova (CZE) / Silje Norendal (NOR)
4	Zachary Elder (USA) / Gretchen Bleiler (USA)
5	Christopher Perdue (USA) / Mike Schultz (USA)
6	Craig Muhlbock (AUS) / Scotty James (AUS)
7	Tony Davis (USA) / Jack Mitrani (USA)
8	Cody Field (USA) / Jamie Anderson (USA)

==== Women's SlopeStyle results ====
Rank	Name	Run 1	Run 2	Run 3	Best Score
Gold medal	Jamie Anderson (USA)	57.00	94.00	83.33	94.00
Silver medal	Julia Marino (USA)	90.00	92.00	83.33	92.00
Bronze medal	Enni Rukajärvi (FIN)	85.66	87.33	49.33	87.33
4	Christy Prior (NZL)	35.33	69.00	39.33	69.00
5	Reira Iwabuchi (JPN)	42.00	48.66	31.66	48.66

==== Men's Big Air results ====
Rank	Name	Score
Gold medal	Maxence Parrot (CAN)	74.00
Silver medal	Marcus Kleveland (NOR)	73.00
Bronze medal	Yuki Kadono (JPN)	68.00
4	Mark McMorris (CAN)	61.00
5	Chris Corning (USA)	61.00
6	Tyler Nicholson (CAN)	52.00
7	Mons Røisland (NOR)	38.00
8	Sebbe De Buck (BEL)	24.00

==== Women's Big Air results ====
Rank	Name	Score
Gold medal	Anna Gasser (AUT)	86.00
Silver medal	Reira Iwabuchi (JPN)	71.00
Bronze medal	Jamie Anderson (USA)	71.00
4	Silje Norendal (NOR)	62.00
5	Christy Prior (NZL)	41.00

==== Men's SlopeStyle results ====
Rank	Name	Run 1	Run 2	Run 3	Best Score
Gold medal	Marcus Kleveland (NOR)	40.00	93.66	39.66	93.66
Silver medal	Darcy Sharpe (CAN)	87.66	26.33	91.00	91.00
Bronze medal	Mark McMorris (CAN)	36.33	90.00	65.66	90.00
4	Red Gerard (USA)	82.66	54.66	40.33	82.66
5	Tyler Nicholson (CAN)	46.66	39.00	81.00	81.00
6	Chris Corning (USA)	31.00	72.33	80.33	80.33
7	Kyle Mack (USA)	27.00	24.66	77.00	77.00
8	Yuki Kadono (JPN)	26.66	11.66	22.66	26.66

==== Women's SuperPipe results ====
Rank	Name	Run 1	Run 2	Run 3	Best Score
Gold medal	Chloe Kim (USA)	90.00	29.00	93.33	93.33
Silver medal	Arielle Gold (USA)	82.66	61.33	92.33	92.33
Bronze medal	Maddie Mastro (USA)	80.00	81.66	89.33	89.33
4	Kelly Clark (USA)	88.66	21.66	-	88.66
5	Cai Xuetong (CHN)	84.66	25.00	6.33	84.66
6	Jiayu Liu (CHN)	34.33	83.66	21.66	83.66
7	Sena Tomita (JPN)	26.66	11.00	28.33	28.33
8	Elena Hight (USA)	13.33	8.00	5.66	13.33

==== Men's SuperPipe results ====
Rank	Name	Run 1	Run 2	Run 3	Best Score
Gold medal	Ayumu Hirano (JPN)	93.00	96.66	99.00	99.00
Silver medal	Scott James (AUS)	96.00	19.66	98.00	98.00
Bronze medal	Ben Ferguson (USA)	26.00	94.33	95.00	95.00
4	Chase Josey (USA)	90.00	32.66	53.66	90.00
5	Toby Miller (USA)	29.66	78.00	82.66	82.66
6	Raibu Katayama (JPN)	81.66	18.00	21.00	81.66
7	Gabe Ferguson (USA)	73.33	76.66	19.00	76.66
8	Jake Pates (USA)	69.66	16.66	34.66	69.66
9	Greg Bretz (USA)	23.66	50.33	39.33	50.33
10	Iouri Podladtchikov (SUI)	12.66	42.66	-	42.66

=== Snowmobiling / BikeCross ===
==== Snowmobile Speed & Style results ====
Rank	Name	Score
Gold medal	Brett Turcotte (CAN)	88.94
Silver medal	Levi LaVallee (USA)	88.67
Bronze medal	Willie Elam (USA)	85.50
4	Cory Davis (USA)	83.67

==== Snowmobile Freestyle results ====
Rank	Name	Run 1	Run 2	Best Score
Gold medal	Brett Turcotte (CAN)	90.33	92.00	92.00
Silver medal	Levi LaVallee (USA)	87.33	88.00	88.00
Bronze medal	Justin Hoyer (USA)	84.33	82.00	84.33
4	Rasmus Johannsson (SWE)	83.00	73.33	83.00
5	Daniel Bodin (SWE)	82.00	-	82.00
6	Willie Elam (USA)	80.00	81.33	81.33
7	Joe Parsons (USA)	57.33	81.00	81.00
8	Heath Frisby (USA)	68.66	77.66	77.66

==== BikeCross results ====
Rank	Name	Time
Gold medal	Cody Matechuk (CAN)	11:42.981
Silver medal	Brock Hoyer (CAN)	11:51.419
Bronze medal	Kody Kamm (USA)	12:05.696
4	Darrin Mees (USA)	12:08.954
5	Nolan Heppner (USA)	12:11.266
6	Josh Hill (USA)	12:16.891
7	Axell Hodges (USA)	12:21.926
8	Jake Scott (USA)	11:57.247
9	Yanick Boucher (CAN)	11:59.356
10	Keaton Ward (USA)	12:03.798
11	Nathan Bles (CAN)	11:48.657
12	Seth Fischer (USA)	16:39.999

==== Snow Bike Best Trick ====
Rank	Name	Run 1	Run 2	Best Score
Gold medal	Rob Adelberg (AUS)	89.00	64.00	89.00
Silver medal	Jackson Strong (AUS)	86.33	86.00	86.33
Bronze medal	Robert Haslem (USA)	75.00	80.33	80.33
4	Ethen Roberts (USA)	60.66	80.00	80.00
5	Brett Turcotte (CAN)	62.00	76.66	76.66
6	Brody Wilson (USA)	70.66	74.66	74.66
7	Keith Sayers (USA)	72.33	-	72.33
8	Axell Hodges (USA)	64.00	67.66	67.66

==== Snow Bike Hill Climb ====
Rank	Name
Gold medal	Travis Whitlock (USA)
Silver medal	Logan Cipala (USA)
Bronze medal	Austin Cardwell (USA)
