= Silje Norendal =

Norwegian snowboarder

Personal information
- Nationality: Norwegian
- Born: 1 September 1993 (age 32) Kongsberg, Norway
- Employer: ROCKST★R (Sponsor)
- Height: 167 cm (5 ft 6 in)
- Weight: 54 kg (119 lb)

Sport
- Country: Norway
- Sport: Snowboarding
- Event(s): Slopestyle, Big air
- Coached by: Per Iver Grimsrud og Sondre Hylland
Medal record
Women's snowboarding
Representing Norway
World Championships
Silver medal – second place	2019 Utah	Slopestyle
Bronze medal – third place	2017 Sierra Nevada	Big air
Winter X Games
Gold medal – first place	2014 Aspen	Slopestyle
Gold medal – first place	2015 Aspen	Slopestyle
Bronze medal – third place	2018 Aspen	Dual slalom
Winter X Games Europe
Gold medal – first place	2013 Tignes	SlopeStyle
Gold medal – first place	2017 Hafjell	Big air

Silje Norendal (born 1 September 1993) is a Norwegian former snowboarder. She competes in the slopestyle and big air events. Her local club is Kongsberg IF.

She won gold in women's slopestyle in Winter X Games Europe in Tignes in 2013.

In January 2014, she won women's slopestyle in Winter X Games in Aspen, Colorado.

At the 2014 Winter Olympics in Sochi, Russia, Norendal finished in eleventh place in the Women's Slopestyle finals with a score of 49.50.

In January 2015, she won women's slopestyle for the second time in Winter X Games in Aspen, Colorado.

At the 2018 Winter Olympics in Pyeongchang, South Korea, she finished in fourth place in the women's Women's Slopestyle finals with a score of 73.91. Additionally, she finished in sixth place in the Women's Big Air finals with a score of 131.50.

On 27 July 2018, Norendal got engaged to hockey player Alexander Bonsaksen. In 2021, they had a daughter together.
