= Zoi Sadowski-Synnott =

New Zealand snowboarder (born 2001)

Zoi Sadowski-Synnott MNZM
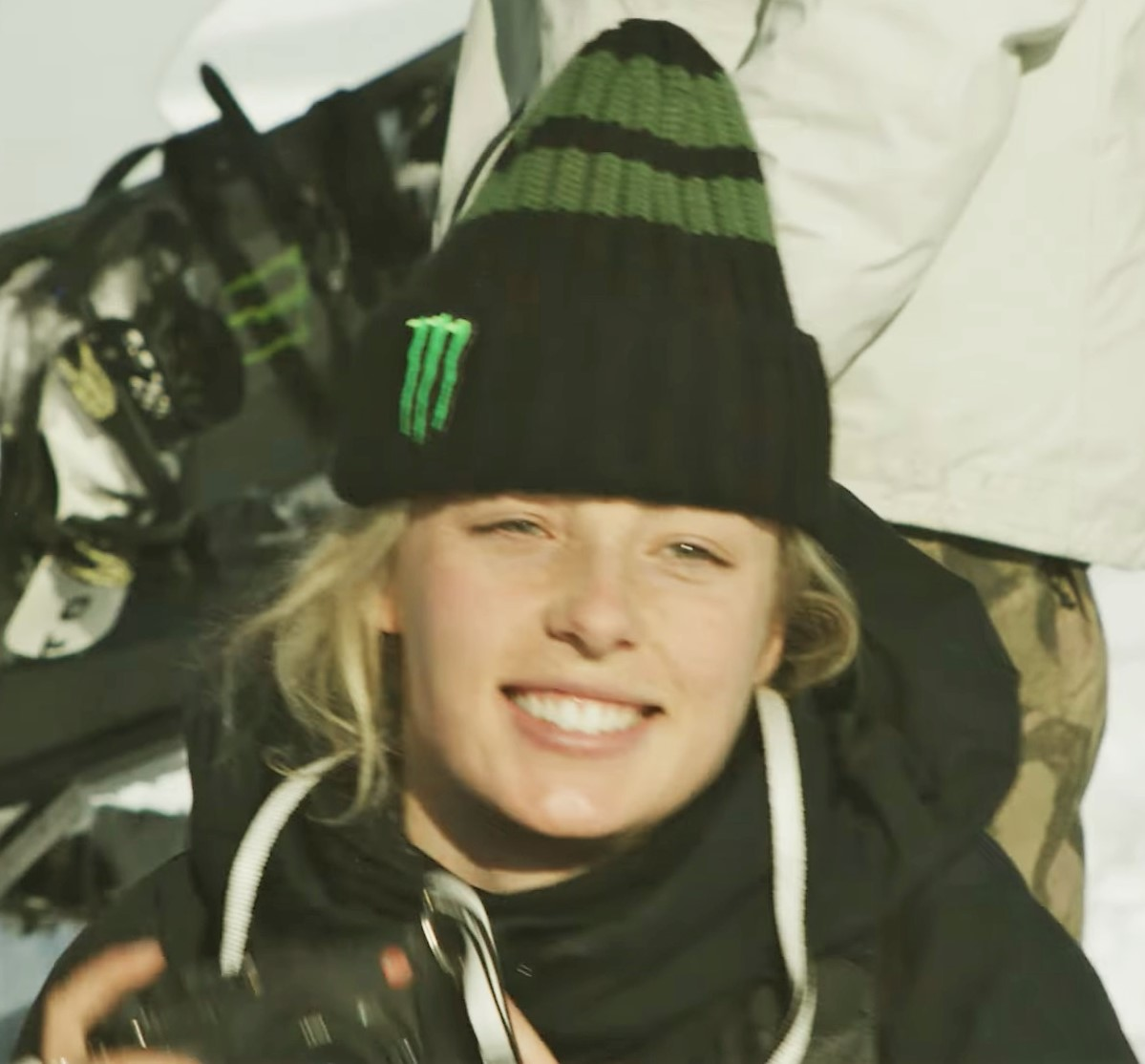
- Sadowski-Synnott in 2022

Personal information
- Born: Zoi Katherine Sadowski-Synnott; 6 March 2001 (age 25) Sydney, New South Wales, Australia
- Height: 1.65 m (5 ft 5 in)
- Weight: 57 kg (126 lb)

Sport
- Country: New Zealand
- Sport: Snowboarding
- Events: Slopestyle; Big air
Medal record
Women's snowboarding
Representing New Zealand
Winter Olympics
Gold medal – first place	2022 Beijing	Slopestyle
Silver medal – second place	2022 Beijing	Big air
Silver medal – second place	2026 Milano Cortina	Big air
Silver medal – second place	2026 Milano Cortina	Slopestyle
Bronze medal – third place	2018 Pyeongchang	Big air
World Championships
Gold medal – first place	2019 Utah	Slopestyle
Gold medal – first place	2021 Aspen	Slopestyle
Gold medal – first place	2025 Engadin	Slopestyle
Silver medal – second place	2017 Sierra Nevada	Slopestyle
Silver medal – second place	2021 Aspen	Big air
Silver medal – second place	2023 Bakuriani	Slopestyle
Winter X Games
Gold medal – first place	2019 Aspen	Slopestyle
Gold medal – first place	2020 Hafjell	Slopestyle
Gold medal – first place	2022 Aspen	Slopestyle
Gold medal – first place	2022 Aspen	Big Air
Gold medal – first place	2023 Aspen	Slopestyle
Gold medal – first place	2025 Aspen	Slopestyle
Silver medal – second place	2019 Aspen	Big Air
Silver medal – second place	2021 Aspen	Slopestyle
Silver medal – second place	2023 Aspen	Big Air
Silver medal – second place	2026 Aspen	Slopestyle
Bronze medal – third place	2021 Aspen	Big Air
Bronze medal – third place	2025 Aspen	Big Air

Zoi Katherine Sadowski-Synnott MNZM (/ˈzoʊi səˈdaʊski-ˈsɪnət/ ZOH-ee sə-DOW-skee SI-nət); born 6 March 2001 is a New Zealand snowboarder, specialising in slopestyle and big air competitions. She won the gold medal in the women's slopestyle and silver in the big air at the 2022 Winter Olympics, becoming New Zealand's first gold medallist and first to win multiple medals at the Winter Olympics. She also won the bronze medal in the women's big air at the 2018 Winter Olympics, silver medal in the women's big air and women's slopestyle at the 2026 Winter Olympics, and won the women's slopestyle title at the 2019 World Championships. Sadowski-Synnott is the most decorated snowboarder in Olympic history with 5 Olympic medals; 1 gold, 3 silver and 1 bronze.

== Early life and family ==
Sadowski-Synnott was born in Sydney, New South Wales, Australia. She was born to an Irish father and American mother of Polish descent. She has four siblings. She initially grew up in the Sydney suburb of Newport before moving with her family to Wānaka, New Zealand, when she was six years old. She was educated at Mount Aspiring College.

== Career ==
Sadowski-Synnott won the silver medal in the slopestyle at the 2017 FIS Snowboard World Championships.

She competed for New Zealand at the 2018 Winter Olympics in Pyeongchang, South Korea. She won the bronze medal in the women's big air, becoming the second New Zealander to win a Winter Olympic medal, after Annelise Coberger who won silver in the women's slalom at the 1992 Winter Olympics. Her big air qualifying saw her become the first woman to successfully land a switch backside 900 (i.e. riding in unnatural stance and performing 2.5 rotations in the backside direction) in competition. She also competed in the women's slopestyle, finishing in 13th place.

At age 16 years 353 days, Sadowski-Synnott briefly became New Zealand's youngest ever Olympic medallist, breaking the previous record of 17 years 100 days set by Danyon Loader at the 1992 Summer Olympics. The record was broken later the same day by Nico Porteous at age 16 years 91 days. She was subsequently selected as New Zealand's flag bearer for the 2018 Winter Olympics closing ceremony, becoming the nation's youngest-ever flag bearer.

In January 2019, Sadowski-Synnott claimed the gold medal in the slopestyle event, and the silver in the big air, at the Winter X Games in Aspen, Colorado. A month later, she won the gold medal in the slopestyle at the 2019 FIS Snowboard World Championships.

In March 2019, she won the slopestyle event at the US Open in Vail, Colorado, completing the triple crown of the Open title, the X Games gold, and the World Championship title.

In March 2020, she claimed the gold medal in the slopestyle event at the Winter X Games in Hafjell.

In January 2021, she claimed the silver medal in the slopestyle event, and the bronze in the big air, at the Winter X Games in Aspen, Colorado. Two months later, she won the gold medal in the slopestyle event at the 2021 FIS Snowboard World Championships.

In December 2021, Sadowski-Synnott claimed victory in the women’s snowboard slopestyle event at the invite-only Winter Dew Tour in Copper Mountain, Colorado. In January 2022, she finished second in the slopestyle event at the U.S. Grand Prix World Cup event in California, USA.

In January 2022, Sadowski-Synnott claimed the gold medal in both the slopestyle event and the big air event at the Winter X Games in Aspen, Colorado.

On 6 February 2022, Sadowski-Synnott won the gold medal in the slopestyle event at the Beijing 2022 Winter Olympics. This was New Zealand's first gold medal at the Winter Olympics. Sadowski-Synnott followed up her gold with a silver in the Big air, becoming the first New Zealander to win multiple medals at a Winter Olympics. She was subsequently awarded the Lonsdale Cup for 2022 by the New Zealand Olympic Committee.

In the 2023 New Year Honours, Sadowski-Synnott was appointed a Member of the New Zealand Order of Merit, for services to snow sports. In January 2023, she successfully defended her gold medal in the slopestyle event at the Winter X Games in Aspen, Colorado. In February 2023, she claimed the silver medal in the slopestyle event at the 2023 FIS Snowboard World Championships.

In January 2025, Sadowski-Synnott claimed the gold medal in the slopestyle event, and snared the bronze medal in the big air event at the Winter X Games in Aspen, Colorado. In those games she became the first woman to land a triple cork in any snowboard or ski slopestyle run, by landing it in a snowboard run. In March 2025, she claimed her third world slopestyle title at the 2025 FIS Snowboard World Championships.

At the 2026 Winter Olympics, Sadowski-Synnott claimed silver in both the Women's big air and Women's slopestyle events.

== International competitions ==
Year	Competition	Venue	Position	Event	Notes
2017	FIS Snowboard World Championships	Sierra Nevada, Spain	2nd	Slopestyle	
2017	FIS Snowboard World Championships	Sierra Nevada, Spain	4th	Big air	
2018	Winter Olympics	Pyeongchang, South Korea	13th	Slopestyle	
2018	Winter Olympics	Pyeongchang, South Korea	3rd	Big air	
2019	Winter X Games	Aspen, Colorado	1st	Slopestyle	
2019	Winter X Games	Aspen, Colorado	2nd	Big air	
2019	FIS Snowboard World Championships	Park City, Utah	1st	Slopestyle	
2019	US Open	Vail, Colorado	1st	Slopestyle	
2020	Winter X Games	Hafjell, Norway	1st	Slopestyle	
2021	Winter X Games	Aspen, Colorado	2nd	Slopestyle	
2021	Winter X Games	Aspen, Colorado	3rd	Big air	
2021	FIS Snowboard World Championships	Aspen, Colorado	1st	Slopestyle	
2021	FIS Snowboard World Championships	Aspen, Colorado	2nd	Big air	
2021	Winter Dew Tour	Copper Mountain, Colorado	1st	Slopestyle	
2022	Winter X Games	Aspen, Colorado	1st	Slopestyle	
2022	Winter X Games	Aspen, Colorado	1st	Big air	
2022	Winter Olympics	Beijing, China	1st	Slopestyle	
2022	Winter Olympics	Beijing, China	2nd	Big air	
2023	Winter X Games	Aspen, Colorado	1st	Slopestyle	
2023	Winter X Games	Aspen, Colorado	2nd	Big air	
2023	FIS Snowboard World Championships	Bakuriani, Georgia	2nd	Slopestyle	
2025	Winter X Games	Aspen, Colorado	1st	Slopestyle	
2025	Winter X Games	Aspen, Colorado	3rd	Big air	
2025	FIS Snowboard World Championships	Engadin, Switzerland	1st	Slopestyle	
2026	Winter X Games	Aspen, Colorado	2nd	Slopestyle	
2026	Winter Olympics	Milan-Cortina	2nd	Big air	
2026	Winter Olympics	Milan-Cortina	2nd	Slopestyle	

Awards
Preceded by Lisa Carrington	New Zealand's Sportswoman of the Year; 2022; 2025	Succeeded by Lisa Carrington
Preceded by Lydia Ko	New Zealand's Sportswoman of the Year; 2022; 2025	Incumbent
Preceded by Lisa Carrington	Halberg Awards – Supreme Award; 2022	Succeeded by Lisa Carrington
Preceded by Lisa Carrington	Lonsdale Cup; 2022	Succeeded by Lisa Carrington
