= Laurie Blouin =

Canadian snowboarder (born 1996)

Personal information
- Nationality: Canadian
- Born: April 7, 1996 (age 30) Quebec City, Quebec, Canada
- Height: 5 ft 5 in (165 cm)
- Weight: 140 lb (64 kg)

Sport
- Country: Canada
- Sport: Snowboarding
- Event: Big Air
- Club: Yves Martineau
Medal record
Women's snowboarding
Representing Canada
Olympic Games
Silver medal – second place	2018 Pyeongchang	Slopestyle
World Championships
Gold medal – first place	2017 Sierra Nevada	Slopestyle
Gold medal – first place	2021 Aspen	Big air
X Games
Gold medal – first place	2019 Aspen	Big air
Silver medal – second place	2020 Aspen	Slopestyle
Bronze medal – third place	2020 Norway	Big air
Bronze medal – third place	2021 Aspen	Slopestyle
Bronze medal – third place	2022 Aspen	Slopestyle
Bronze medal – third place	2023 Aspen	Big air

Laurie Blouin (born April 7, 1996) is a Canadian freestyle snowboarder. She is the reigning FIS World Champion in slopestyle, winning the gold at the 2017 World Championships. Blouin won a silver medal in slopestyle at the 2018 Winter Olympics in Pyeongchang, South Korea.

== Life and career ==
Blouin is from Stoneham, Quebec, and started snowboarding when she was six years old after her brother introduced it to her. She began training with Max Henault at age 13 after messaging him on Facebook and getting permission to train on his property. Blouin's training with Henault included practice on trampolines. Prior to the 2018 Pyongchang Olympics, Blouin rented a room and lived at Henault's house full time for two years in order to get enough proper training. She won her first major competition when she won the junior world title in slopestyle in 2013, at the age of 16. Blouin made her World Cup debut at her home resort in Stoneham, Quebec, in February 2012. Her first World Cup podium came when she finished second in slopestyle at the New Zealand Winter Games in August 2015. She claimed another World Cup silver at Seiser Alm, Italy, in January 2017. Blouin wrapped up her 2016–17 season with a slopestyle victory at a World Snowboard Tour event, the Grandvalira Total Fight, in Andorra. Blouin was an entrant at the 2017 FIS World Championships in Sierra Nevada, Spain. In the final of the slopestyle event, she scored a 78.00 to earn gold, holding off silver medalist Zoi Sadowski-Synnott, who scored 77.50. She also finished 1st in qualifications and 6th in the final at the Big Air event. Blouin credited the "vibe" and atmosphere of Sierra Nevada for her world championship, saying, "I was not that stressed because the weather is so incredible here [and] the vibe is so fun. Before I dropped [in], I was super focused, and I told myself I was just going to drop [in] and just have fun."

Following her world championship win, Blouin competed in the 2018 Winter Olympics. During a practice training run, she crashed hard in training after her snowboard cut a rut and had to be carried off the slope on a stretcher. Teammate Mark McMorris would later say of her injury that "She whacked her noggin pretty good and cut up her face." Despite this, Blouin had her name on the rider list for Sunday's qualifying runs. High winds delayed the qualifying; instead, the final would be two runs for all the female athletes the next day. Despite continued high winds, the finals were not called off; this proved to be a controversial decision as many riders would fall due to the wind. Blouin also fell on her first run but completed a clean second run. On her third and final jump, she only tried a cap single cab underflip instead of a double. This was enough for her to win the silver medal behind American Jamie Anderson. Blouin acknowledged her difficult situation, but said, "Now I'm here in second place, I just don't believe it. It's a dream come true."

In the 2018-2019 season, Blouin won the gold medal in big air at the 2019 Winter X Games.

In 2020, she won the slopestyle silver medal at the X Games in Aspen and the bronze medal in big air at the X Games in Norway.

In January 2022, Blouin was named to Canada's 2022 Olympic team. In the slopestyle event at the 2022 Beijing Olympics, Blouin qualified in 7th place and just missed the podium in the final, finishing in 4th place.

She won the gold medal in big air at the 2021 World Championships. She won the bronze medal in slopestyle twice at the 2021 and 2022 Winter X Games in Aspen, and the bronze in big air at the 2023 Winter X Games.
