= Jessica Rich (snowboarder) =

Australian snowboarder (born 1990)

Personal information
- Born: 21 March 1990 (age 35)

Sport
- Country: Australia
- Sport: Snowboarding
- Event(s): Slopestyle, Big air

Jessica Rich (born 21 March 1990) is an Australian snowboarder who competes internationally.

She represented Australia at the 2018 Winter Olympics.
