= Alex Beaulieu-Marchand =

Canadian freestyle skier

Personal information
- Born: March 3, 1994 (age 32) Quebec City, Quebec, Canada
- Height: 6 ft 0 in (183 cm)
- Weight: 155 lb (70 kg)

Sport
- Country: Canada
- Sport: Freestyle skiing
- Events: Big air and Slopestyle
Medal record
Men's Freestyle skiing
Representing Canada
Olympic Games
Bronze medal – third place	2018 Pyeongchang	Slopestyle
World Championships
Bronze medal – third place	2019 Utah	Big air
Winter X Games
Bronze medal – third place	2019 Oslo	Big air
Bronze medal – third place	2019	Real Ski
Silver medal – second place	2019 Aspen	Big air
Silver medal – second place	2019 Aspen	Slopestyle
Bronze medal – third place	2017 Aspen	Slopestyle

Alex Beaulieu-Marchand (born March 3, 1994) is a Canadian freestyle skier. He represented Canada in slopestyle at the 2014 Winter Olympics in Sochi and 2018 Winter Olympics in Pyeongchang, winning the bronze medal at the latter.

== Early life ==
Alex started skiing at age 2, he grew up in up in a family of skiers but he was mainly influenced by his grandfather to ski. He downhill skied until he was 12 until he was introduced to slopestyle skiing. He had a friend that skied Slopestyle so he decided to try it out. As a kid one of his favorite hobbies was hockey, he wanted nothing more than to be an NHL player. But his parents were skiers, and they insisted on bringing him to the ski hill because they did not enjoy sitting in an arena all the time. This quickly developed a love for skiing. He enjoyed knitting too and it was like a job for him at a time. He dreamed of going to Whistler B.C to ski but he and his family could not afford it. So he found a way to make money, He knitted hats all summer and sold them eventually gaining enough money to go to Whistler B.C. And 12 years later he spends a lot of time training on those same hills as a part of the Canadian Slopestyle team at 24 years old. His biggest inspiration was his mentors Yan Bussière and Félix-Antoine Noël.

== Career ==
Alex has been in a lot of huge events in his skiing career, including the X-GAMES, and the Olympics. His first professional event was the 2013 X-GAMES in Aspen, Colorado, where he placed 15th In Slopestyle Skiing. That same year he participated in the Tignes, France X-GAMES and came 5th in men's freest. A year later in the 2014 Aspen X-GAMES he did not do amazing, but he did okay. He came 16th in slopestyle skiing. That same year in Aspen he came 5th in men's Big air, which is insane for his first big air competition. In the 2015 X-GAMES again in Aspen, Colorado, he placed 9th. He could not ski in the 2016 X-GAMES because of a collarbone injury and a torn ACL. In 2017 he skied slopestyle 2 times: once in Aspen and once in Norway. He placed 3rd in Aspen, and 15th in Norway. In 2018 he will be participating in the Minneapolis X-GAMES. He's also done extremely well in the Dew tour ION, he placed 2nd in Breckenridge late 2016. He participated in the FIS (FEDERATION INTERNATIONALE DE SKI) in February 2017, taking home bronze). He has participated in two Olympics, the 2014 winter Olympic games in Sochi, Russia and the 2018 PyeongChang, South Korea Olympic games. He placed 12th in Sochi, and taking home bronze in PyeongChang, South Korea. He participated at the FIS Freestyle Ski and Snowboarding World Championships 2019, winning a medal. His top performance during a X Games event was in 2019 where he took silver in both Slopestyle and Big Air. He also participated in the 2019 edition of X Games RealSki in which he took home a bronze medal.
