= Asami Hirono =

Japanese snowboarder

Personal information
- Born: 8 November 1990 (age 34)

Sport
- Country: Japan
- Sport: Snowboarding
- Event(s): Slopestyle, Big air

Asami Hirono (広野 あさみ, Hirono Asami; born 8 November 1990) is a Japanese snowboarder who competes internationally.

She represented Japan at the 2018 Winter Olympics.
