= Lucile Lefevre =

French snowboarder (born 1995)

Personal information
- Born: 10 November 1995 (age 30) Briançon, France

Sport
- Country: France
- Sport: Snowboarding
- Event(s): Slopestyle, Big air

Lucile Lefevre (born 10 November 1995) is a French snowboarder who competes internationally.

She represented France at the 2018 Winter Olympics.
