= Miyabi Onitsuka =

Japanese snowboarder (born 1998)

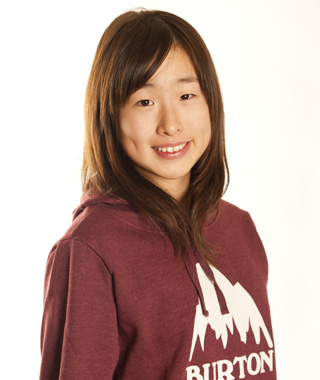
- Onitsuka in 2013

Personal information
- Born: 12 October 1998 (age 27) Kumamoto, Japan
- Height: 1.58 m (5 ft 2 in)
- Weight: 47 kg (104 lb)

Sport
- Country: Japan
- Sport: Snowboarding
- Event: Big Air
Medal record
Women's snowboarding
Representing Japan
World Championships
Gold medal – first place	2015 Kreischberg	Slopestyle
Silver medal – second place	2023 Bakuriani	Big air
Bronze medal – third place	2017 Sierra Nevada	Slopestyle
Bronze medal – third place	2021 Aspen	Big air
Bronze medal – third place	2023 Bakuriani	Slopestyle
Winter X Games
Gold medal – first place	2020 Aspen	Big air
Silver medal – second place	2020 Norway	Big air
Silver medal – second place	2021 Aspen	Big air
Bronze medal – third place	2022 Aspen	Big air

Miyabi Onitsuka (鬼塚 雅, Onitsuka Miyabi; born 12 October 1998) is a Japanese snowboarder.

== Career ==
She started snowboarding professionally in 2005. She won a gold medal in slopestyle at the FIS Freestyle Ski and Snowboarding World Championships 2015.
