= Jamie Anderson (snowboarder) =

American snowboarder (born 1990)

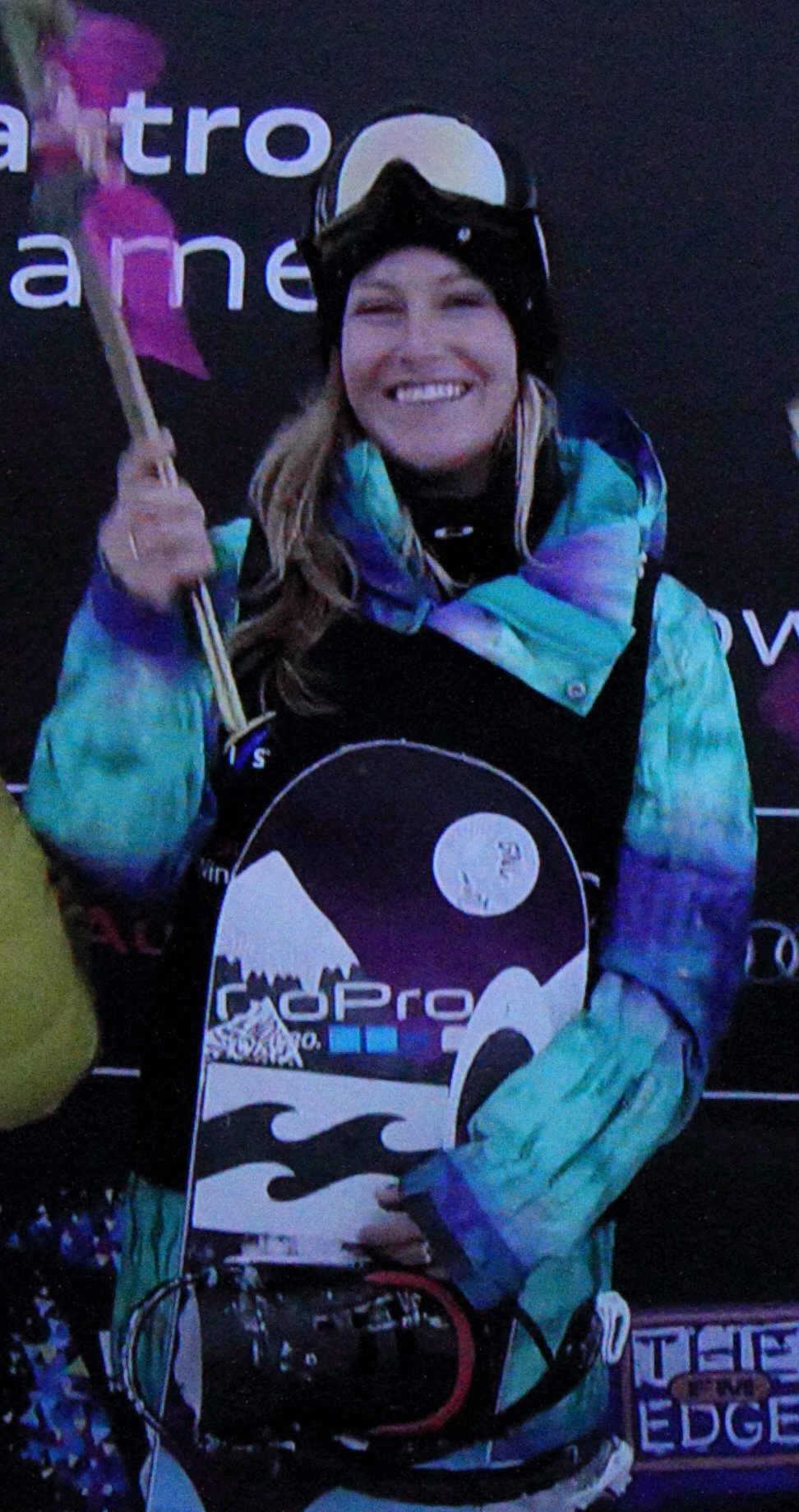
- Anderson in 2013

Personal information
- Full name: Jamie Louise Anderson
- Born: September 13, 1990 (age 36) South Lake Tahoe, California, U.S.
- Height: 5 ft 3 in (160 cm)
- Weight: 119 lb (54 kg)
- Website: itsjamieanderson.com

Sport
- Country: United States
- Sport: Snowboarding
- Event: Slopestyle
- Club: Sierra at Tahoe
Medal record
Representing the United States
Olympic Games
Gold medal – first place	2014 Sochi	Slopestyle
Gold medal – first place	2018 Pyeongchang	Slopestyle
Silver medal – second place	2018 Pyeongchang	Big air
World Championships
Silver medal – second place	2021 Aspen	Slopestyle
Bronze medal – third place	2019 Utah	Slopestyle
Winter X Games
Gold medal – first place	2007 Aspen	Slopestyle
Gold medal – first place	2008 Aspen	Slopestyle
Gold medal – first place	2012 Aspen	Slopestyle
Gold medal – first place	2013 Aspen	Slopestyle
Gold medal – first place	2017 Aspen	Dual slalom
Gold medal – first place	2018 Aspen	Slopestyle
Gold medal – first place	2020 Aspen	Slopestyle
Gold medal – first place	2021 Aspen	Slopestyle
Silver medal – second place	2010 Aspen	Slopestyle
Silver medal – second place	2014 Aspen	Slopestyle
Silver medal – second place	2015 Aspen	Slopestyle
Silver medal – second place	2016 Aspen	Slopestyle
Silver medal – second place	2017 Aspen	Slopestyle
Bronze medal – third place	2006 Aspen	Slopestyle
Bronze medal – third place	2011 Aspen	Slopestyle
Bronze medal – third place	2018 Aspen	Big air

Jamie Louise Anderson (born September 13, 1990) is an American professional snowboarder. She won the gold medal in the inaugural Women's Slopestyle Event at the 2014 Winter Olympics in Sochi, Russia and repeated the feat at the 2018 Winter Olympics in Pyeongchang, South Korea, making her the first female snowboarder to win more than one Olympic gold medal. She has won gold medals in slopestyle at the Winter X Games in consecutive years in 2007/8 and 2012/3. She has won 21 X Games medals, making her one of the most decorated female snowboarders in X Games history

== Personal life ==
Anderson was born and raised in South Lake Tahoe, California, the fifth of eight children. She snowboarded for the first time at age nine and began pursuing the sport actively. Anderson was homeschooled at Visions in Education, allowing her to spend almost every day on the mountains.

Anderson currently resides in Whistler, British Columbia, Canada with her fiance, Tyler Nicholson, a Canadian snowboarder and her two children Misty and Nova Nicholson. She has been in a relationship with Tyler Nicholson since 2015. She is reported to own The Dream Inn, a private residence suite that overlooks Whistler Blackcomb Ski Resort and other private places in Tahoe and Colorado.

Aside from snowboarding, Anderson practices yoga and meditation to keep her healthy for her upcoming competitions. She is also a member of the POW's Athlete Alliance & an ambassador for Protect Our Winters.

== Career ==
Anderson is recognized for her success in slopestyle competitions, including multiple medals at the X Games and Olympics. She has been one of the most successful female snowboarders on the Swatch TTR World Snowboard Tour and took home the gold medal in the Olympic debut of women's snowboard slopestyle at the 2014 Sochi Winter Olympic Games.

In addition to her many career wins, Anderson has been giving back to the snowboarding community through participation in the High Cascade Snowboard Camp. She hosted a Signature Session™ at High Cascade in 2009–2012 and was scheduled to host another Signature Session™ camp in 2014.

Anderson began snowboarding in 2000 when she received a hand-me-down snowboard at the age of nine and qualified for the 2004 Winter X Games just four years later. In 2005, she took home a bronze, becoming the youngest female medalist in the competition at age 15.

Through the Jamie Anderson Foundation established in 2013, she has provided more than 30 young winter sports athletes with equipment, clothing, season passes and financial backing for travel to the USASA national competitions.

=== 2006–2007 ===
During the 2006–2007 season, Anderson won the TTR 6Star Burton US Open Snowboarding Championships slopestyle, and the Roxy Chicken Jam emporium in Kaprun, Austria, the quarterpipe event at the O'Neill Evolution in Davos, the Billabong slopestyle Jam and the Abominable Snow man.

=== 2007–2008 ===
With top placements at major events on the TTR World Snowboard Tour in 2007–2008, among those victories at the Burton European Open slopestyle and the Roxy Chicken Jam US slopestyle, she took home the Women's Swatch TTR World Snowboard Tour Champion title.

Event	Star Tier	Format	Position
Garnier Fructis Australian Open	5star	SS	1
Roxy Chicken Jam Europe	6Star	SS	2
Burton European Open	6Star	SS	1
Nissan X-Trail Nippon Open	5Star	SS	2
Chevy Grand Prix	5Star	SS	3
Burton US Open	6Star	SS	2
Roxy Chicken Jam US	6Star	SS	1

=== 2008–2009 ===
Anderson started the season with the first half-pipe victory of her career with a win in both the slopestyle and halfpipe events of the 5-Star Burton New Zealand Open. After her successful start and after leading the rankings for over 40 weeks, Anderson finished the season in third place on the Swatch TTR Tour due to injury.

Event	Star Tier	Format	Position
Burton New Zealand Open	5star	SS	1
Burton New Zealand Open	5Star	HP	1
Billabong Snowstock	3Star	BA	1
Burton Australian Open	5Star	HP	3
Burton Australian Open	5Star	SS	1
Burton European Open	6Star	SS	1
Nissan X-Trail Nippon Open	5Star	SS	2

=== 2009–2010 ===
Again, there was another promising kick-off for Anderson on the TTR World Tour with a win at the 5-Star Burton New Zealand Open slopestyle and the 3Star Billabong Bro Down in Australia. Anderson continued her season with good results from the Winter Dew Tour, finishing off the season in the lead of the Winter Dew Tour Cup Standings.

Anderson then returned to the TTR Tour and took home the Roxy Chicken Jam US slopestyle title and a podium finish at the Burton US Open slopestyle. She ended her season in world no. 5 on the Swatch TTR World Tour. Anderson ended her season in the no. 1 spot on the Swatch TTR World Tour.

=== 2013–2014 ===
Anderson won an Olympic gold medal, the first ever offered in slopestyle, at the 2014 Winter Olympics in Sochi, Russia.

=== 2017–2018 ===
Anderson won her second Olympic gold medal at the 2018 Olympics in PyeongChang, South Korea. She also won a silver in the big air event. This was the second time slopestyle had been offered in the Olympics, so Anderson has won both gold medals in slopestyle in Olympic history, making her the first female snowboarder to win more than one Olympic gold medal.

=== 2019–2020 ===
Anderson won a bronze medal in the big air event at the 2019 Winter X Games Aspen. She also participated the 2019 FIS Snowboard World Championships where she won a bronze medal and criticized the FIS President Gian-Franco Kasper in response to an article based on a report in Deadspin, which quoted Kasper as denying climate change, making controversial remarks about immigration and working with dictators to organize Olympic Games. Her winnings in that event were donated to Protect Our Winters, and she urged her fellow competitors to do the same thing on her Instagram post. In 2020, she won a gold medal in the slopestyle event at the 2020 Burton US Open and at the 2020 Winter X Games Aspen, where she became the most-medaled female competitor in the history of X Games.

== Television appearances ==
In 2015, Anderson competed on the seventh season of The Celebrity Apprentice for her charity, Protect Our Winters. She was fired in the fourth episode.

In April 2018, Anderson was announced as one of the celebrities who will compete on season 26 of Dancing with the Stars. She was partnered with professional dancer Artem Chigvintsev. She was eliminated on the first episode, and she finished in 9th place.
