= Enni Rukajärvi =

Finnish snowboarder (born 1990)

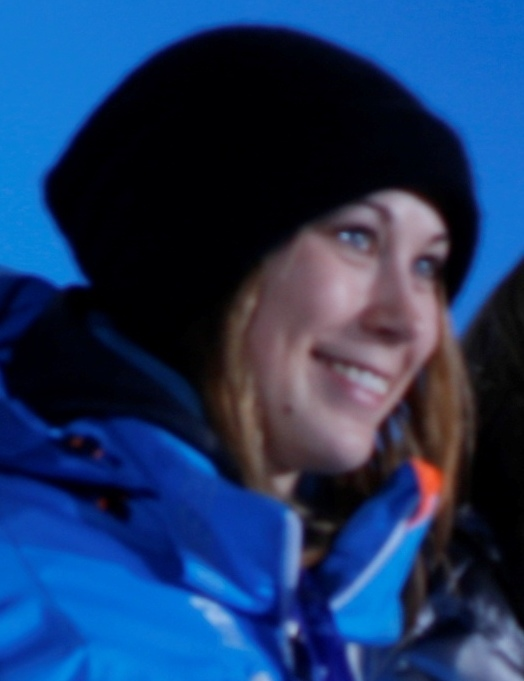
- Rukajärvi in 2014

Personal information
- Born: 13 May 1990 (age 36) Kuusamo, Finland
- Height: 1.65 m (5 ft 5 in)
- Weight: 54 kg (119 lb)

Sport
- Country: Finland
- Sport: Snowboarding
Medal record
Representing Finland
Olympic Games
Silver medal – second place	2014 Sochi	Slopestyle
Bronze medal – third place	2018 Pyeongchang	Slopestyle
World Championships
Gold medal – first place	2011 La Molina	Slopestyle
Silver medal – second place	2017 Sierra Nevada	Big Air
Winter X Games
Gold medal – first place	2011 Aspen	Slopestyle
Silver medal – second place	2012 Aspen	Slopestyle
Bronze medal – third place	2018 Aspen	Slopestyle
Bronze medal – third place	2019 Aspen	Slopestyle

Enni Rukajärvi (born 13 May 1990) is a Finnish snowboarder. She is world champion and Olympic medalist in slopestyle.

== Biography ==
Rukajärvi won the gold medal at the 2011 FIS Snowboarding World Championships in the slopestyle event. Rukajärvi also won gold in Snowboard SlopeStyle at the 2011 Winter X Games XV in Aspen.

Enni won the silver medal representing Finland in slopestyle at the 2014 Winter Olympics in Sochi, where she also served as the flagbearer. At the 2018 Winter Olympics in PyeongChang, she won a bronze medal in slopestyle and also competed in big air.

Olympic Games
Preceded by Ville Peltonen	Flagbearer for Finland; Sochi 2014	Succeeded by Janne Ahonen
