= Slopestyle =

Winter downhill sport discipline

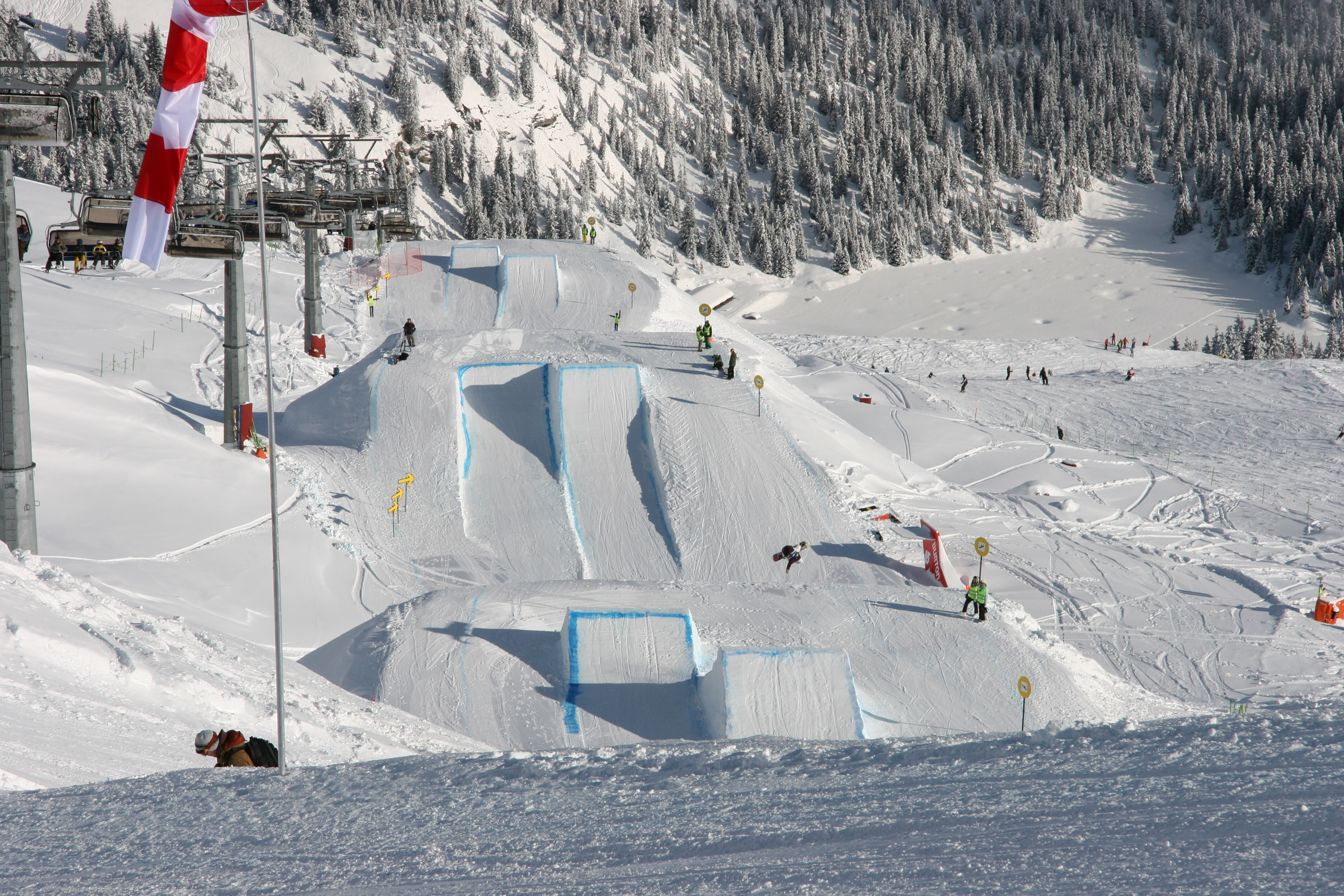
- A slopestyle course.
- Highest governing body: International Ski Federation

Characteristics
- Contact: No
- Team members: Single competitors
- Mixed-sex: Yes
- Type: Snowboarding, Freestyle skiing

Presence
- Olympic: Since 2014

Slopestyle is a winter sport in which athletes ski or snowboard down a course with a variety of obstacles including rails, jumps and other terrain park features. Points are scored for amplitude, originality and quality of tricks. The discipline has its roots in action sports like skateboarding and BMX and has very successfully crossed over into the snow sports worlds of skiing and snowboarding. Skiers use twin-tip skis for their symmetry since they often go large portions of the course backward (referred to as "switch") and for their balanced weight so as to not destabilize spins. Slopestyle tricks fall mainly into four categories: spins, grinds, grabs and flips, and most tricks done in competition are a combination of these.

Slopestyle is one of the freestyle disciplines, along with moguls, aerials, cross, big air and half-pipe.

== History of Slopestyle ==
Competitive slopestyle started in 1997.

Slopestyle became an Olympic event, in both skiing and snowboarding forms, at the 2014 Winter Games in Sochi, Russia. The first Olympic champions in Slopestyle Skiing were American Joss Christensen for the men and Canadian Dara Howell for the women. The first Olympic champions for Snowboarding Slopestyle were both Americans, Sage Kotsenburg for the men and Jamie Anderson for the women.

== Competition ==
In competition, athletes compete for points awarded by judges on a structured basis. The scoring criteria vary from one organization to another and from each event to the next, but in general athletes are judged on these criteria:

- Amplitude: Height of jumps, also called air. Bigger tricks score higher.
- Difficulty: Degree of difficulty of the tricks.
- Execution: How well the athletes perform their tricks. For example, tight rotation, clean grabs, and smooth landing.
- Variety: The difference of the tricks within the run. Doing the same trick off all the jumps will not score highly even if it is a very difficult trick.
- Progression: How the trick selection progresses the sport, for example brand new tricks will score high because they push the sport forward.
- Combinations or flow: The way the athletes string the tricks together. Having to slow down or otherwise reset after a trick will lose points.
- Overall: The whole package, including the athlete's personal style.

A feature that is somewhat unique to slopestyle and similar events is that even though it is a judged sport, scores cannot be compared between events: "A run that scores 65 at one event may score 75 at another event. The score is just a tool to organize the rankings and may vary based on the range and anchor score set for the day."

== Competitive results ==
=== Olympics ===
Men's Snowboarding Slopestyle results
Competition	Gold	Silver	Bronze
2022 Olympics	Maxence Parrot	Su Yiming	Mark McMorris
2018 Olympics	Red Gerard	Maxence Parrot	Mark McMorris
2014 Olympics	Sage Kotsenburg	Ståle Sandbech	Mark McMorris

Women's Snowboarding Slopestyle results
Competition	Gold	Silver	Bronze
2022 Olympics	Zoi Sadowski-Synnott	Julia Marino	Tess Coady
2018 Olympics	Jamie Anderson	Laurie Blouin	Enni Rukajärvi
2014 Olympics	Jamie Anderson	Enni Rukajärvi	Jenny Jones

Men's Freestyle Skiing Slopestyle results
Competition	Gold	Silver	Bronze
2022 Olympics	Alex Hall	Nick Goepper	Jesper Tjäder
2018 Olympics	Øystein Bråten	Nick Goepper	Alex Beaulieu-Marchand
2014 Olympics	Joss Christensen	Gus Kenworthy	Nick Goepper

Women's Freestyle Skiing Slopestyle results
Competition	Gold	Silver	Bronze
2022 Olympics	Mathilde Gremaud	Eileen Gu	Kelly Sildaru
2018 Olympics	Sarah Höfflin	Mathilde Gremaud	Isabel Atkin
2014 Olympics	Dara Howell	Devin Logan	Kim Lamarre
