= Brooke Voigt =

Canadian snowboarder (born 1993)

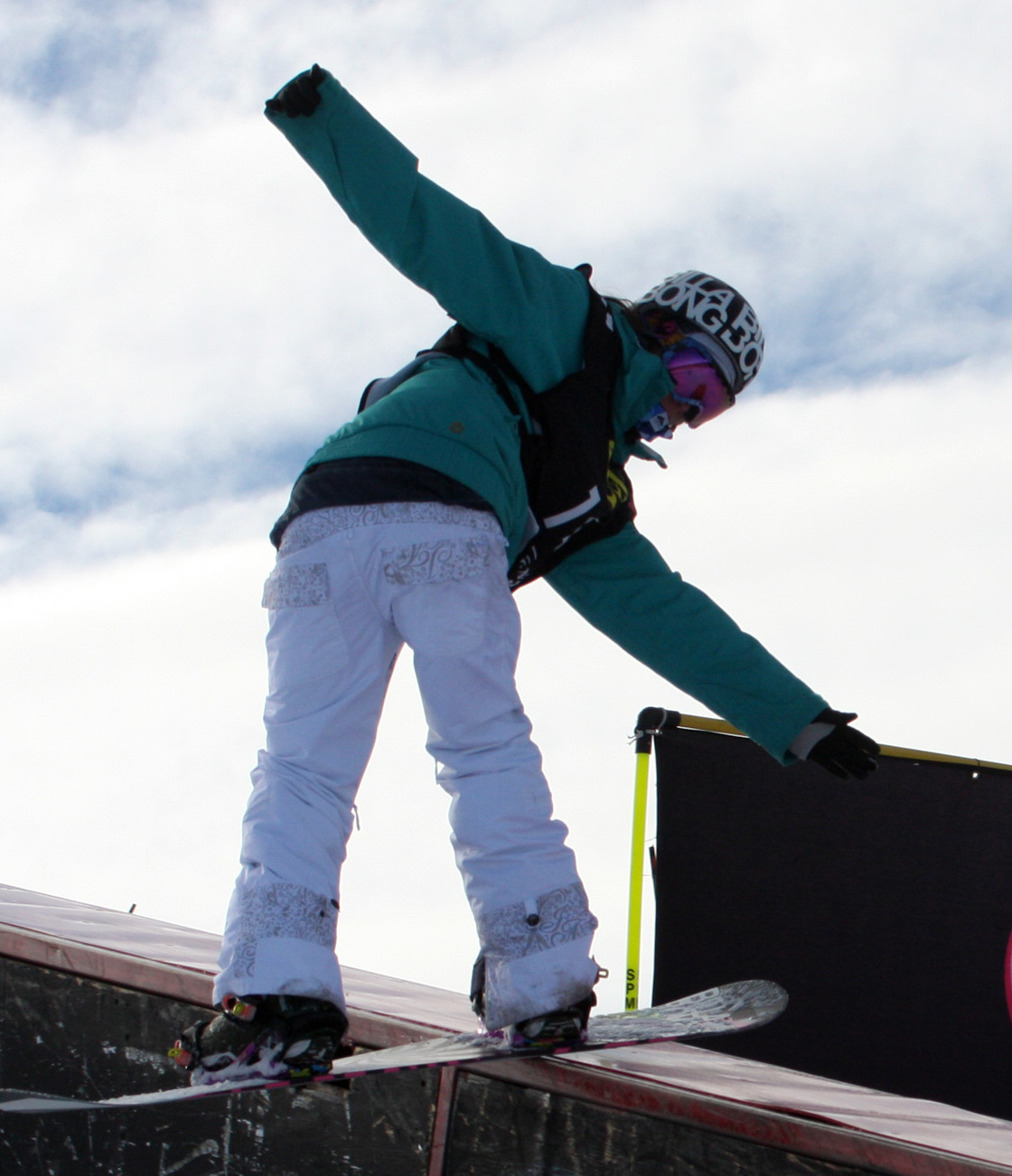
- Brooke Voigt in 2010

Personal information
- Born: 17 November 1993 (age 32) Fort McMurray, Alberta
- Height: 5 ft 7 in (170 cm)

Sport
- Country: Canada
- Sport: Snowboarding

Brooke Voigt (born 17 November 1993) is a Canadian freestyle snowboarder. She grew up in Fort McMurray, Alberta, and graduated from the National Sports School in Calgary.

== Career ==
=== Winter Olympics ===
Voigt was named to Canada's 2018 Olympic team in the slopestyle and big air events.

In January 2022, Voigt was named to Canada's 2022 Olympic team.
