= Reira Iwabuchi =

Japanese snowboarder (born 2001)

Personal information
- Native name: 岩渕 麗楽
- Born: 14 December 2001 (age 24) Iwate Prefecture, Japan
- Height: 4 ft 11 in (150 cm)

Sport
- Country: Japan
- Sport: Snowboarding
- Events: Slopestyle, Big air
Medal record
Women's snowboarding
Representing Japan
World Championships
Silver medal – second place	2025 Engadin	Big air
Bronze medal – third place	2025 Engadin	Slopestyle
Winter X Games
Gold medal – first place	2023 Aspen	Big air
Silver medal – second place	2018 Aspen	Big air
Bronze medal – third place	2020 Aspen	Big air

Reira Iwabuchi (岩渕 麗楽, Iwabuchi Reira; born 14 December 2001) is a Japanese snowboarder. She won a silver medal in big air at Winter X Games XXII.

At the 2023 X Games, she became the first female to land a triple underflip in competition. She did so while competing in women’s snowboard big air, winning a gold medal.
