= FIS Freestyle Ski and Snowboarding World Championships 2025 – Women's snowboard slopestyle =

Women's snowboard slopestyle at the FIS Freestyle Ski and Snowboarding World Championships 2025
- Location: Corvatsch, Switzerland
- Date: 20 March (qualification); 21 March (final)
- Competitors: 31 from 18 nations
- Winning points: 90.15

Medalists
gold medal	Zoi Sadowski-Synnott	New Zealand
silver medal	Kokomo Murase	Japan
bronze medal	Reira Iwabuchi	Japan

The Women's snowboard slopestyle competition at the FIS Freestyle Ski and Snowboarding World Championships 2025 was held on 20 and 21 March 2025.

== Qualification ==
The qualification was started at 09:00. The twelve best snowboarders qualified for the final.

Rank	Bib	Start order	Name	Country	Run 1	Run 2	Best	Notes
1	1	5	Zoi Sadowski-Synnott	New Zealand	78.96	88.54	88.54	Q
2	3	4	Kokomo Murase	Japan	77.95	79.54	79.54	Q
3	6	8	Anna Gasser	Austria	76.03	78.53	78.53	Q
4	4	2	Mari Fukada	Japan	63.00	77.25	77.25	Q
5	5	3	Reira Iwabuchi	Japan	74.84	76.98	76.98	Q
6	2	10	Mia Brookes	Great Britain	60.60	72.34	72.34	Q
7	15	1	Tess Coady	Australia	66.39	5.42	66.39	Q
8	28	23	Andrina Salis	Switzerland	65.21	19.24	65.21	Q
9	7	7	Annika Morgan	Germany	39.61	64.69	64.69	Q
10	9	9	Laurie Blouin	Canada	61.05	51.74	61.05	Q
11	11	12	Melissa Peperkamp	Netherlands	57.89	59.68	59.68	Q
12	22	20	Momo Suzuki	Japan	58.69	47.40	58.69	Q
13	19	11	Meila Stalker	Australia	56.13	23.26	56.13	
14	27	22	Maisie Hill	Great Britain	56.07	27.56	56.07	
15	12	18	Lily Dhawornvej	United States	55.80	18.17	55.80	
16	17	19	Katie Ormerod	Great Britain	51.38	53.55	53.55	
17	16	17	Ariane Burri	Switzerland	40.94	53.12	53.12	
18	13	15	Hahna Norman	United States	43.91	51.72	51.72	
19	31	32	Marilu Poluzzi	Italy	21.94	50.93	50.93	
20	25	21	Novalie Engholm	Sweden	50.88	48.63	50.88	
21	21	24	Romy van Vreden	Netherlands	44.05	12.02	44.05	
22	33	27	Cool Wakushima	New Zealand	16.00	43.17	43.17	
23	26	31	Nora Cornell	Spain	20.04	40.54	40.54	
24	18	16	Evy Poppe	Belgium	26.59	38.84	38.84	
25	30	29	Hanna Karrer	Austria	32.08	14.74	32.08	
26	20	14	Laura Záveská	Czech Republic	7.97	30.26	30.26	
27	8	6	Rebecca Flynn	United States	3.99	29.96	29.96	
28	23	25	Laura Anga	Estonia	25.97	21.56	25.97	
29	29	26	Eveliina Taka	Finland	18.51	18.88	18.88	
30	14	13	Xiong Shirui	China	DNS	10.06	10.06	
31	32	28	Lucia Georgalli	New Zealand	5.78	7.78	7.78	
	24	30	Hanne Eilertsen	Norway	Did not start			

== Final ==
The final was started on 21 March at 09:00.

Rank	Bib	Start order	Name	Country	Run 1	Run 2	Best
1st place, gold medalist(s)	1	12	Zoi Sadowski-Synnott	New Zealand	71.53	90.15	90.15
2nd place, silver medalist(s)	3	11	Kokomo Murase	Japan	87.02	32.40	87.02
3rd place, bronze medalist(s)	5	8	Reira Iwabuchi	Japan	81.68	83.55	83.55
4	4	9	Mari Fukada	Japan	79.70	82.15	82.15
5	6	10	Anna Gasser	Austria	80.71	47.18	80.71
6	2	7	Mia Brookes	Great Britain	59.16	74.23	74.23
7	7	4	Annika Morgan	Germany	67.85	32.24	67.85
8	22	1	Momo Suzuki	Japan	19.20	63.27	63.27
9	11	2	Melissa Peperkamp	Netherlands	61.08	62.58	62.58
10	9	3	Laurie Blouin	Canada	46.04	32.82	46.04
11	28	5	Andrina Salis	Switzerland	29.17	19.02	29.17
12	15	6	Tess Coady	Australia	12.31	23.23	23.23
