= FIS Freestyle Ski and Snowboarding World Championships 2025 – Women's snowboard big air =

Women's snowboard big air at the FIS Freestyle Ski and Snowboarding World Championships 2025
- Location: St. Moritz, Switzerland
- Date: 26 March (qualification); 28 March (final)
- Competitors: 31 from 18 nations
- Winning points: 162.50

Medalists
gold medal	Kokomo Murase	Japan
silver medal	Reira Iwabuchi	Japan
bronze medal	Mari Fukada	Japan

The Women's snowboard big air competition at the FIS Freestyle Ski and Snowboarding World Championships 2025 was held on 26 and 28 March 2025.

== Qualification ==
The qualification was started on 26 March at 15:30. The eight best snowboarders qualified for the final.

Rank	Bib	Start order	Name	Country	Run 1	Run 2	Run 3	Total	Notes
1	2	3	Zoi Sadowski-Synnott	New Zealand	67.25	79.00	89.50	168.50	Q
2	4	8	Anna Gasser	Austria	79.25	66.25	88.00	167.25	Q
3	5	7	Kokomo Murase	Japan	77.50	82.25	84.50	166.75	Q
4	3	2	Mari Fukada	Japan	79.50	85.25	DNI	164.75	Q
5	8	5	Momo Suzuki	Japan	82.50	74.75	DNI	157.25	Q
6	6	6	Reira Iwabuchi	Japan	74.25	73.25	76.50	150.75	Q
7	1	4	Mia Brookes	Great Britain	67.75	63.75	79.50	143.25	Q
8	7	10	Annika Morgan	Germany	67.00	25.50	74.25	141.25	Q
9	12	19	Hanna Karrer	Austria	63.50	75.00	DNI	138.50	
10	15	12	Hahna Norman	United States	45.00	73.00	62.25	135.25	
11	17	15	Ariane Burri	Switzerland	69.75	64.75	DNI	134.50	
12	24	29	Romy van Vreden	Netherlands	62.25	63.50	70.75	133.00	
13	9	9	Lily Dhawornvej	United States	60.25	72.00	57.25	132.25	
14	14	16	Xiong Shirui	China	52.75	65.50	64.75	130.25	
15	29	31	Andrina Salis	Switzerland	62.00	62.50	DNI	124.50	
16	30	21	Marilu Poluzzi	Italy	64.50	55.75	DNI	120.25	
17	32	28	Cool Wakushima	New Zealand	46.75	57.00	62.75	119.75	
18	16	20	Melissa Peperkamp	Netherlands	12.00	61.50	57.25	118.75	
19	31	23	Lucia Georgalli	New Zealand	57.00	54.25	56.50	113.50	
20	19	30	Katie Ormerod	Great Britain	58.00	12.00	54.50	112.50	
21	20	22	Eveliina Taka	Finland	54.25	15.50	55.50	109.75	
22	21	24	Evy Poppe	Belgium	50.25	10.75	54.00	104.25	
23	10	1	Tess Coady	Australia	52.50	50.75	DNI	103.25	
24	18	11	Meila Stalker	Australia	41.25	56.50	DNI	97.75	
25	24	14	Rebecca Flynn	United States	42.25	11.75	52.75	95.00	
26	23	17	Maisie Hill	Great Britain	21.25	59.25	28.25	87.50	
27	26	27	Laura Anga	Estonia	11.50	41.50	41.00	82.50	
28	22	13	Laura Záveská	Czech Republic	13.50	54.50	10.50	65.00	
29	27	25	Nora Cornell	Spain	40.50	8.25	10.75	51.25	
30	13	18	Laurie Blouin	Canada	19.75	21.75	11.00	32.75	
31	28	26	Novalie Engholm	Sweden	11.75	13.00	10.50	23.50	

== Final ==
The final was started on 28 March at 19:30.

Rank	Bib	Start order	Name	Country	Run 1	Run 2	Run 3	Total
1st place, gold medalist(s)	5	6	Kokomo Murase	Japan	85.75	76.75	DNI	162.50
2nd place, silver medalist(s)	6	3	Reira Iwabuchi	Japan	83.00	73.00	DNI	156.00
3rd place, bronze medalist(s)	3	5	Mari Fukada	Japan	78.00	15.75	75.25	153.25
4	8	4	Momo Suzuki	Japan	75.25	71.75	78.25	150.00
5	1	2	Mia Brookes	Great Britain	17.00	64.75	84.75	149.50
6	4	7	Anna Gasser	Austria	21.25	88.00	24.50	112.50
7	2	8	Zoi Sadowski-Synnott	New Zealand	Did not start			
8	7	1	Annika Morgan	Germany	Did not start			
