= Snowboarding at the 2026 Winter Olympics – Women's slopestyle =

Women's slopestyle at the XXV Olympic Winter Games
- Snowboarding
- Venue: Livigno Snow Park, Valtellina
- Date: 15, 18 February

Medalists
1st place, gold medalist(s)		Mari Fukada	Japan
2nd place, silver medalist(s)		Zoi Sadowski-Synnott	New Zealand
3rd place, bronze medalist(s)		Kokomo Murase	Japan

The women's slopestyle competition in snowboarding at the 2026 Winter Olympics was held on 15 February (qualification) and 18 February (final), at the Livigno Snow Park in Valtellina. Mari Fukada of Japan won the event, her first Olympic medal. Zoi Sadowski-Synnott of New Zealand won the silver medal, and Kokomo Murase of Japan won bronze.

== Background ==
The defending champion Zoi Sadowski-Synnott and the 2022 bronze medalist Tess Coady qualified for the event. The silver medalist, Julia Marino, was missing the Olympics with an injury. Kokomo Murase was leading the 2025–26 FIS Snowboard World Cup standings in women's slopestyle prior to the Olympics. The 2025 World champion was Sadowski-Synnott.

== Results ==
=== Qualification ===
Q — Qualified for the Final

The top 12 athletes in the qualifiers advance to the Final.

Rank	Bib	Order	Name	Country	Run 1	Run 2	Best	Notes
1	1	9	Zoi Sadowski-Synnott	New Zealand	81.73	88.08	88.08	Q
2	3	7	Kokomo Murase	Japan	84.93	35.13	84.93	Q
3	29	24	Yu Seung-eun	South Korea	76.80	18.60	76.80	Q
4	11	16	Reira Iwabuchi	Japan	73.65	59.46	73.65	Q
5	5	5	Anna Gasser	Austria	73.50	38.35	73.50	Q
6	14	19	Ally Hickman	Australia	71.41	31.96	71.41	Q
7	2	4	Mari Fukada	Japan	71.03	35.61	71.03	Q
8	4	3	Annika Morgan	Germany	61.31	69.53	69.53	Q
9	9	8	Laurie Blouin	Canada	69.30	32.70	69.30	Q
10	12	18	Lily Dhawornvej	United States	11.73	68.90	68.90	Q
11	19	12	Jess Perlmutter	United States	31.48	68.58	68.58	Q
12	15	17	Juliette Pelchat	Canada	68.25	19.43	68.25	Q
13	13	20	Melissa Peperkamp	Netherlands	60.71	67.75	67.75	
14	21	30	Ariane Burri	Switzerland	58.75	47.25	58.75	
15	20	15	Eveliina Taka	Finland	57.98	39.03	57.98	
16	6	6	Mia Brookes	Great Britain	38.11	56.53	56.53	
17	30	22	Hanna Karrer	Austria	53.88	13.35	53.88	
18	7	10	Momo Suzuki	Japan	44.08	53.50	53.50	
19	27	29	Nora Cornell Pato	Spain	23.98	53.03	53.03	
20	24	21	Lucia Georgalli	New Zealand	42.20	50.60	50.60	
21	17	11	Maisie Hill	Great Britain	24.21	48.66	48.66	
22	10	2	Meila Stalker	Australia	47.36	47.11	47.36	
23	28	26	Laura Záveská	Czech Republic	19.90	46.70	46.70	
24	22	28	Zhang Xiaonan	China	20.06	42.11	42.11	
25	16	13	Hahna Norman	United States	23.00	41.70	41.70	
26	25	23	Romy van Vreden	Netherlands	22.08	39.91	39.91	
27	8	1	Tess Coady	Australia	38.95	30.18	38.95	
28	26	25	Marilu Poluzzi	Italy	21.25	37.85	37.85	
29	23	27	Evy Poppe	Belgium	35.33	36.96	36.96	
30	18	14	Sky Remans	Belgium	28.13	25.48	28.13	

=== Final ===
While the final was originally scheduled for 17 February, heavy snow caused event organizers to reschedule the final for 14:30 local time on 18 February.

Rank	Bib	Order	Name	Country	Run 1	Run 2	Run 3	Best
1st place, gold medalist(s)	2	6	Mari Fukada	Japan	33.98	85.70	87.83	87.83
2nd place, silver medalist(s)	1	12	Zoi Sadowski-Synnott	New Zealand	73.01	77.61	87.48	87.48
3rd place, bronze medalist(s)	3	11	Kokomo Murase	Japan	79.30	30.56	85.80	85.80
4	4	5	Annika Morgan	Germany	77.65	78.78	37.01	78.78
5	9	4	Laurie Blouin	Canada	40.10	33.73	68.60	68.60
6	19	2	Jess Perlmutter	United States	44.70	68.18	43.30	68.18
7	14	7	Ally Hickman	Australia	67.70	4.26	48.68	67.70
8	11	9	Reira Iwabuchi	Japan	11.51	44.16	52.11	52.11
9	15	1	Juliette Pelchat	Canada	20.15	46.43	51.76	51.76
10	5	8	Anna Gasser	Austria	46.95	27.35	28.26	46.95
11	12	3	Lily Dhawornvej	United States	41.81	17.25	24.50	41.81
12	29	10	Yu Seung-eun	South Korea	20.70	34.18	15.46	34.18
