= FIS Freestyle Ski and Snowboarding World Championships 2023 – Women's snowboard slopestyle =

Women's snowboard slopestyle at the FIS Freestyle Ski and Snowboarding World Championships 2023
- Location: Bakuriani, Georgia
- Dates: 27 February
- Competitors: 29 from 17 nations
- Winning points: 91.38

Medalists
gold medal	Mia Brookes	Great Britain
silver medal	Zoi Sadowski-Synnott	New Zealand
bronze medal	Miyabi Onitsuka	Japan

The Women's snowboard slopestyle competition at the FIS Freestyle Ski and Snowboarding World Championships 2023 was held on 27 February 2023.

== Qualification ==
The qualification was started at 10:00. The twelve best snowboarders qualified for the final.

Rank	Bib	Start order	Name	Country	Run 1	Run 2	Best	Notes
1	3	4	Zoi Sadowski-Synnott	New Zealand	81.71	87.08	87.08	Q
2	4	10	Mia Brookes	Great Britain	85.36	82.41	85.36	Q
3	5	2	Anna Gasser	Austria	73.75	78.00	78.00	Q
4	8	6	Mari Fukada	Japan	58.03	74.13	74.13	Q
5	17	13	Miyabi Onitsuka	Japan	73.55	34.20	73.55	Q
6	6	3	Tess Coady	Australia	69.70	48.08	69.70	Q
7	2	7	Reira Iwabuchi	Japan	68.28	69.68	69.68	Q
8	11	11	Emeraude Maheux	Canada	27.98	68.00	68.00	Q
9	21	12	Annika Morgan	Germany	66.10	67.73	67.73	Q
10	13	26	Melissa Peperkamp	Netherlands	44.23	61.61	61.61	Q
11	22	22	Meila Stalker	Australia	51.48	58.91	58.91	Q
12	7	1	Jasmine Baird	Canada	58.28	27.30	58.28	Q
13	20	30	Šárka Pančochová	Czech Republic	55.51	24.23	55.51	
14	28	28	Evy Poppe	Belgium	20.58	54.26	54.26	
15	27	24	Lucie Silvestre	France	44.10	48.55	48.55	
16	1	5	Laurie Blouin	Canada	43.98	47.76	47.76	
17	24	27	María Hidalgo	Spain	28.43	44.73	44.73	
18	15	21	Courtney Rummel	United States	44.45	26.21	44.45	
19	19	29	Telma Särkipaju	Finland	15.55	40.21	40.21	
20	18	25	Hinari Asanuma	Japan	38.25	39.38	39.38	
21	9	9	Ariane Burri	Switzerland	38.56	14.03	38.56	
22	16	20	Ty Schnorrbusch	United States	33.80	23.43	33.80	
23	10	8	Bianca Gisler	Switzerland	32.33	27.98	32.33	
24	30	16	Carola Niemelä	Finland	31.18	16.55	31.18	
25	29	23	Urška Pribošič	Slovenia	29.75	12.08	29.75	
26	25	19	Bettina Roll	Norway	16.51	26.66	26.66	
27	14	18	Jade Thurgood	United States	2.73	21.45	21.45	
28	23	15	Vanessa Volopichová	Czech Republic	19.51	21.31	21.31	
29	26	14	Hanne Eilertsen	Norway	21.23	14.31	21.23	
	12	17	Rebecca Flynn	United States	Did not start			

== Final ==
The final was started at 13:45.

Rank	Bib	Start order	Name	Country	Run 1	Run 2	Best
1st place, gold medalist(s)	4	11	Mia Brookes	Great Britain	86.41	91.38	91.38
2nd place, silver medalist(s)	3	12	Zoi Sadowski-Synnott	New Zealand	88.78	59.21	88.78
3rd place, bronze medalist(s)	17	8	Miyabi Onitsuka	Japan	83.05	34.51	83.05
4	6	7	Tess Coady	Australia	78.88	82.25	82.25
5	8	9	Mari Fukada	Japan	31.95	78.76	78.76
6	2	6	Reira Iwabuchi	Japan	75.31	52.26	75.31
7	5	10	Anna Gasser	Austria	37.53	71.08	71.08
8	7	1	Jasmine Baird	Canada	69.65	16.70	69.65
9	11	5	Emeraude Maheux	Canada	50.85	68.38	68.38
10	13	3	Melissa Peperkamp	Netherlands	65.40	67.35	67.35
11	22	2	Meila Stalker	Australia	59.11	56.78	59.11
12	21	4	Annika Morgan	Germany	38.00	53.73	53.73
