= Snowboarding at the 2026 Winter Olympics – Women's big air =

Women's big air at the XXV Olympic Winter Games
- Snowboarding
- Venue: Livigno Snow Park, Valtellina
- Date: 8, 9 February
- Winning time: 179

Medalists
1st place, gold medalist(s)		Kokomo Murase	Japan
2nd place, silver medalist(s)		Zoi Sadowski-Synnott	New Zealand
3rd place, bronze medalist(s)		Yu Seung-eun	South Korea

The women's big air competition in snowboarding at the 2026 Winter Olympics was held on 8 February (qualification) and 9 February (final), at the Livigno Snow Park in Valtellina. Kokomo Murase of Japan won the event. This was her first Olympic gold. Zoi Sadowski-Synnott of New Zealand won silver, replicating her 2022 performance. Yu Seung-eun of South Korea won bronze, her first Olympic medal.

== Background ==
All three 2022 medalists, Anna Gasser (the 2018 and 2022 champion), Zoi Sadowski-Synnott, and Kokomo Murase, qualified for the event. Miyabi Onitsuka was leading the 2025–26 FIS Snowboard World Cup standings in women's big air. The 2025 World champion was Kokomo Murase.

Gasser had a chance of becoming the first woman triple Olympic champion in snowboard. She qualified for the final but ended up in the eighth position.

== Results ==
=== Qualification ===
Q — Qualified for the Final

The top 12 athletes in the qualifiers advance to the Final.

Rank	Bib	Order	Name	Country	Run 1	Run 2	Run 3	Total	Notes
1	2	2	Zoi Sadowski-Synnott	New Zealand	90.00	82.25	82.25	172.25	Q
2	1	3	Kokomo Murase	Japan	86.25	82.50	85.00	171.25	Q
3	7	9	Mia Brookes	Great Britain	29.75	89.00	78.00	167.00	Q
4	19	17	Yu Seung-eun	South Korea	80.75	77.75	88.75	166.50	Q
5	5	5	Mari Fukada	Japan	25.00	77.50	88.25	165.75	Q
6	13	19	Meila Stalker	Australia	19.25	82.25	82.75	165.00	Q
7	12	13	Reira Iwabuchi	Japan	72.25	79.50	84.50	164.00	Q
8	4	6	Momo Suzuki	Japan	79.00	13.50	81.50	160.50	Q
9	3	10	Anna Gasser	Austria	81.75	74.75	84.75	159.50	Q
10	8	7	Hanna Karrer	Austria	79.50	18.25	77.75	157.25	Q
11	22	21	Zhang Xiaonan	China	79.75	71.00	74.75	154.50	Q
12	9	1	Tess Coady	Australia	78.50	55.00	75.00	153.50	Q
13	6	4	Annika Morgan	Germany	67.75	85.00	18.50	152.75	
14	11	18	Laurie Blouin	Canada	15.75	72.50	77.75	150.25	
15	16	16	Ally Hickman	Australia	85.25	61.75	64.25	149.50	
16	14	15	Juliette Pelchat	Canada	76.50	17.50	71.50	148.00	
17	29	25	Laura Záveská	Czech Republic	16.50	80.50	63.75	144.25	
18	24	22	Eveliina Taka	Finland	75.75	63.75	79.50	143.25	
19	17	20	Ariane Burri	Switzerland	76.25	13.00	66.50	142.75	
20	10	8	Lily Dhawornvej	United States	83.75	19.25	58.00	141.75	
21	15	11	Melissa Peperkamp	Netherlands	70.25	66.75	DNI	137.00	
22	27	23	Romy van Vreden	Netherlands	60.25	52.75	74.75	135.00	
23	23	24	Jessica Perlmutter	United States	77.00	55.25	17.00	132.25	
24	26	28	Marilu Poluzzi	Italy	59.00	22.25	72.25	131.25	
25	25	26	Lucia Georgalli	New Zealand	78.25	38.75	DNI	117.00	
26	30	29	Nora Cornell Pato	Spain	59.25	50.75	DNI	110.00	
27	21	27	Sky Remans	Belgium	24.75	73.50	24.50	98.25	
28	18	14	Hahna Norman	United States	31.75	82.00	11.50	93.50	
29	20	12	Maisie Hill	Great Britain	20.00	DNI	57.25	77.25	

=== Final ===
Rank	Bib	Order	Name	Country	Run 1	Run 2	Run 3	Total
1st place, gold medalist(s)	1	11	Kokomo Murase	Japan	89.75	72.00	89.25	179.00
2nd place, silver medalist(s)	2	12	Zoi Sadowski-Synnott	New Zealand	27.75	88.75	83.50	172.25
3rd place, bronze medalist(s)	19	9	Yu Seung-eun	South Korea	87.75	83.25	DNI	171.00
4	7	10	Mia Brookes	Great Britain	80.75	78.75	DNI	159.50
5	22	2	Zhang Xiaonan	China	74.25	14.25	70.25	144.50
6	4	5	Momo Suzuki	Japan	54.75	81.50	DNI	136.50
7	9	1	Tess Coady	Australia	70.00	61.00	DNI	131.00
8	3	4	Anna Gasser	Austria	25.00	45.00	76.26	121.25
9	5	8	Mari Fukada	Japan	18.50	85.00	30.00	115.00
10	13	7	Meila Stalker	Australia	72.50	35.00	DNI	107.50
11	12	6	Reira Iwabuchi	Japan	82.75	20.50	DNI	103.25
12	8	3	Hanna Karrer	Austria	65.50	18.75	23.50	89.00
