= FIS Freestyle Ski and Snowboarding World Championships 2021 – Women's snowboard slopestyle =

Women's snowboard slopestyle competition

Women's snowboard slopestyle at the FIS Freestyle Ski and Snowboarding World Championships 2021
- Venue: Aspen/Snowmass
- Location: Aspen, United States
- Date: 10 March (qualification); 12 March
- Competitors: 27 from 18 nations
- Winning points: 85.95

Medalists
gold medal	Zoi Sadowski-Synnott	New Zealand
silver medal	Jamie Anderson	United States
bronze medal	Tess Coady	Australia

The Women's snowboard slopestyle competition at the FIS Freestyle Ski and Snowboarding World Championships 2021 was held on 12 March. A qualification was held on 10 March 2021.

== Qualification ==
The qualification was started on 10 March at 10:45. The eight best snowboarders qualified for the final.

Rank	Bib	Start order	Name	Country	Run 1	Run 2	Best	Notes
1	2	5	Zoi Sadowski-Synnott	New Zealand	66.75	94.50	94.50	Q
2	1	2	Jamie Anderson	United States	31.00	90.75	90.75	Q
3	4	9	Tess Coady	Australia	85.50	89.75	89.75	Q
4	21	23	Enni Rukajärvi	Finland	89.50	9.25	89.50	Q
5	7	7	Anna Gasser	Austria	78.75	89.25	89.25	Q
6	9	8	Kokomo Murase	Japan	84.75	6.75	84.75	Q
7	16	13	Annika Morgan	Germany	59.00	81.25	81.25	Q
8	22	24	Cool Wakushima	New Zealand	79.75	16.75	79.75	Q
9	19	17	Loranne Smans	Belgium	79.25	22.25	79.25	
10	10	10	Melissa Peperkamp	Netherlands	76.75	9.50	76.75	
11	6	6	Katie Ormerod	Great Britain	74.25	22.25	74.25	
12	3	1	Laurie Blouin	Canada	53.00	74.00	74.00	
13	14	20	Brooke Voigt	Canada	70.25	27.00	70.25	
14	29	26	María Hidalgo	Spain	63.00	65.75	65.75	
15	15	15	Hailey Langland	United States	64.75	59.25	64.75	
16	11	4	Hanne Eilertsen	Norway	13.00	63.75	63.75	
17	48	27	Jade Thurgood	United States	46.50	59.00	59.00	
18	20	28	Ty Schnorrbusch	United States	27.75	55.50	55.50	
19	28	16	Klaudia Medlová	Slovakia	46.75	34.00	46.75	
20	12	14	Reira Iwabuchi	Japan	14.00	46.25	46.25	
21	27	25	Terra Traub	Chinese Taipei	26.50	38.50	38.50	
22	25	21	Jasmine Baird	Canada	33.25	30.00	33.25	
23	8	3	Evy Poppe	Belgium	25.25	22.50	25.25	
24	17	19	Lucile Lefevre	France	12.75	23.00	23.00	
25	30	29	Lea Jugovac	Croatia	9.25	21.00	21.00	
26	23	11	Šárka Pančochová	Czech Republic	8.50	15.25	15.25	
27	24	18	Miyabi Onitsuka	Japan	8.00	5.25	8.00	
	13	12	Sommer Gendron	Canada	Did not start			
	18	22	Hinari Asanuma	Japan	Did not start			

== Final ==
The final was started at 09:30.

Rank	Bib	Start order	Name	Country	Run 1	Run 2	Run 3	Best
1st place, gold medalist(s)	2	8	Zoi Sadowski-Synnott	New Zealand	28.56	47.06	85.95	85.95
2nd place, silver medalist(s)	1	7	Jamie Anderson	United States	81.10	58.96	77.51	81.10
3rd place, bronze medalist(s)	4	6	Tess Coady	Australia	73.06	78.13	74.56	78.13
4	21	5	Enni Rukajärvi	Finland	51.21	55.00	77.90	77.90
5	9	3	Kokomo Murase	Japan	31.00	74.11	77.08	77.08
6	7	4	Anna Gasser	Austria	36.01	74.05	76.96	76.96
7	16	2	Annika Morgan	Germany	41.03	70.16	36.68	70.16
8	22	1	Cool Wakushima	New Zealand	42.16	59.61	67.81	67.81
