= FIS Freestyle Ski and Snowboarding World Championships 2023 – Women's snowboard big air =

Women's snowboard big air at the FIS Freestyle Ski and Snowboarding World Championships 2023
- Location: Bakuriani, Georgia
- Dates: 2 March (qualification); 4 March
- Competitors: 22 from 15 nations
- Winning points: 162.50

Medalists
| gold medal | Anna Gasser | Austria |
| silver medal | Miyabi Onitsuka | Japan |
| bronze medal | Tess Coady | Australia |

The Women's snowboard big air competition at the FIS Freestyle Ski and Snowboarding World Championships 2023 was held on 2 and 4 March 2023.

== Qualification ==
The qualification was started on 2 March at 14:30. Due to foggy weather, the run 3 had to be stopped and cancelled. The eight best snowboarders qualified for the final.

| Rank | Bib | Start order | Name | Country | Run 1 | Run 2 | Best | Notes |
|---|---|---|---|---|---|---|---|---|
| 1 | 4 | 7 | Mia Brookes | Great Britain | 84.00 | 72.75 | 84.00 | Q |
| 2 | 18 | 16 | Annika Morgan | Germany | 83.50 | 82.00 | 83.50 | Q |
| 3 | 7 | 6 | Miyabi Onitsuka | Japan | 81.00 | 73.25 | 81.00 | Q |
| 4 | 2 | 8 | Anna Gasser | Austria | 73.50 | 60.75 | 73.50 | Q |
| 5 | 5 | 2 | Mari Fukada | Japan | 65.00 | 73.25 | 73.25 | Q |
| 6 | 12 | 17 | Hinari Asanuma | Japan | 70.25 | 55.25 | 70.25 | Q |
| 7 | 3 | 9 | Laurie Blouin | Canada | 70.00 | 53.00 | 70.00 | Q |
| 8 | 6 | 10 | Tess Coady | Australia | 61.00 | 66.50 | 66.50 | Q |
| 9 | 20 | 20 | Vanessa Volopichová | Czech Republic | 62.50 | 66.25 | 66.25 | |
| 10 | 10 | 5 | Emeraude Maheux | France | 13.75 | 65.25 | 65.25 | |
| 11 | 11 | 12 | Melissa Peperkamp | Netherlands | 63.25 | 63.25 | 63.25 | |
| 12 | 19 | 23 | Hanne Eilertsen | Norway | 62.00 | 58.25 | 62.00 | |
| 13 | 16 | 15 | Urška Pribošič | Slovenia | 47.50 | 60.50 | 60.50 | |
| 14 | 15 | 24 | Šárka Pančochová | Czech Republic | 60.00 | 12.25 | 60.00 | |
| 15 | 9 | 1 | Ariane Burri | Switzerland | 12.50 | 58.00 | 58.00 | |
| 16 | 13 | 18 | Evy Poppe | Belgium | 56.75 | 9.75 | 56.75 | |
| 17 | 17 | 14 | Meila Stalker | Australia | 56.50 | 38.00 | 56.50 | |
| 18 | 8 | 3 | Jasmine Baird | Canada | 45.25 | 56.25 | 56.25 | |
| 19 | 23 | 13 | Lucie Silvestre | France | 48.75 | 52.25 | 52.25 | |
| 20 | 22 | 19 | Bettina Roll | Norway | 51.00 | 51.00 | 51.00 | |
| 21 | 21 | 22 | María Hidalgo | Spain | 8.75 | 11.75 | 11.75 | |
| 22 | 14 | 11 | Telma Särkipaju | Finland | 7.25 | DNS | 7.25 | |
| | 24 | 21 | Carola Niemelä | Finland | Did not start | | | |
| | 1 | 4 | Reira Iwabuchi | Japan | Did not start | | | |

== Final ==
The final was started on 4 March at 12:30.

| Rank | Bib | Start order | Name | Country | Run 1 | Run 2 | Run 3 | Total |
|---|---|---|---|---|---|---|---|---|
| 1st place, gold medalist(s) | 2 | 5 | Anna Gasser | Austria | 87.75 | 74.75 | 18.25 | 162.50 |
| 2nd place, silver medalist(s) | 7 | 6 | Miyabi Onitsuka | Japan | 80.25 | 19.00 | 81.00 | 161.25 |
| 3rd place, bronze medalist(s) | 6 | 1 | Tess Coady | Australia | 84.75 | 68.50 | 17.75 | 153.25 |
| 4 | 3 | 2 | Laurie Blouin | Canada | 79.75 | 9.25 | 68.50 | 148.25 |
| 5 | 4 | 8 | Mia Brookes | Great Britain | 21.50 | 66.50 | 75.25 | 141.75 |
| 6 | 18 | 7 | Annika Morgan | Germany | 55.75 | 11.75 | 68.75 | 124.50 |
| 7 | 12 | 3 | Hinari Asanuma | Japan | 68.25 | 18.00 | 22.50 | 90.75 |
| 8 | 5 | 4 | Mari Fukada | Japan | 19.75 | 21.00 | 17.50 | 21.00 |
