= Snowboarding at the 2020 Winter Youth Olympics – Girls' big air =

Girls' big air at the III Winter Youth Olympic Games
- Venue: Leysin Park & Pipe
- Dates: 21, 22 January
- Competitors: 22 from 15 nations

Medalists
1st place, gold medalist(s)		Hinari Asanuma	Japan
2nd place, silver medalist(s)		Annika Morgan	Germany
3rd place, bronze medalist(s)		Melissa Peperkamp	Netherlands

The girls' big air event in snowboarding at the 2020 Winter Youth Olympics took place on 21 and 22 January at the Leysin Park & Pipe.

== Qualification ==
The qualification was held on 21 January at 13:00.

Rank	Bib	Name	Country	Run 1	Run 2	Best	Notes
1	15	Annika Morgan	Germany	89.00	DNS	89.00	Q
2	3	Melissa Peperkamp	Netherlands	82.00	57.00	82.00	Q
3	1	Hinari Asanuma	Japan	76.00	74.33	76.00	Q
4	24	Kanami Okuyama	Japan	74.00	47.33	74.00	Q
5	18	Ty Schnorrbusch	United States	70.00	DNS	70.00	Q
6	25	Evy Poppe	Belgium	69.33	65.00	69.33	Q
7	7	Marie Kreisingerová	Czech Republic	56.00	18.33	56.00	Q
8	21	Courtney Rummel	United States	53.66	DNS	53.66	Q
9	13	Bianca Gisler	Switzerland	50.66	1.00	50.66	Q
10	19	Bettina Roll	Norway	48.66	15.33	48.66	Q
11	16	Kamilla Kozuback	Canada	42.00	35.66	42.00	Q
12	9	Morena Poggi	Argentina	40.33	14.00	40.33	Q
13	20	Stine Espeli Olsen	Norway	40.00	16.00	40.00	
14	23	Lily Jekel	Australia	22.00	33.66	33.66	
15	11	Marie Hahnl	Germany	29.66	12.33	29.66	
16	5	María Chávez	Argentina	20.66	12.66	20.66	
17	8	Alexandra Chen	Australia	15.33	16.33	16.33	
18	22	Eveliina Taka	Finland	16.00	15.33	16.00	
19	17	Kiara Zung	Austria	15.66	13.33	15.66	
20	14	Eva Hanicová	Slovakia	12.66	DNS	12.66	
21	10	Guo Junyan	China	12.00	12.00	12.00	
22	12	Mona Danuser	Switzerland	10.66	DNS	10.66	
	2	Andie Gendron	Canada	Did not start			
	4	Marilù Poluzzi	Italy	Did not start			
	6	Juliette Pelchat	Canada	Did not start			

== Final ==
The final was held on 22 January at 14:50.

Rank	Start order	Bib	Name	Country	Run 1	Run 2	Run 3	Total
1st place, gold medalist(s)	10	1	Hinari Asanuma	Japan	93.50	10.75	79.00	172.50
2nd place, silver medalist(s)	12	15	Annika Morgan	Germany	86.75	18.00	73.75	160.50
3rd place, bronze medalist(s)	11	3	Melissa Peperkamp	Netherlands	80.75	69.25	18.50	150.00
4	4	13	Bianca Gisler	Switzerland	77.75	57.00	10.75	134.75
5	8	18	Ty Schnorrbusch	United States	62.50	68.50	56.00	131.00
6	9	24	Kanami Okuyama	Japan	76.25	16.00	23.50	99.75
7	6	7	Marie Kreisingerová	Czech Republic	57.00	25.50	DNS	82.50
8	2	16	Kamilla Kozuback	Canada	23.75	53.25	19.00	72.25
9	1	9	Morena Poggi	Argentina	7.50	16.75	35.50	52.25
10	7	25	Evy Poppe	Belgium	28.75	8.75	16.25	45.00
11	3	19	Bettina Roll	Norway	6.50	DNS	DNS	6.50
	5	21	Courtney Rummel	United States	Did not start			
