= Tess Coady =

Australian snowboarder (born 2000)

Personal information
- Born: 2 November 2000 (age 25) Melbourne, Victoria, Australia
- Height: 1.69 m (5 ft 7 in)
- Weight: 53 kg (117 lb)

Sport
- Country: Australia
- Sport: Snowboarding
- Events: Slopestyle, Big air

World Cup career
- Indiv. starts: 24 (BA – 8, SS – 16)
- Indiv. podiums: 7 (BA – 1, SS – 6)
- Indiv. wins: 2 (SS – 2)
Medal record
Women's snowboarding
Representing Australia
Winter Olympics
Bronze medal – third place	2022 Beijing	Slopestyle
World Championships
Bronze medal – third place	2021 Aspen	Slopestyle
Bronze medal – third place	2023 Bakuriani	Big air
Winter X Games
Silver medal – second place	2023 Aspen	Slopestyle
- Updated on 1 March 2026

Tess Coady (born 2 November 2000) is an Australian snowboarder from Melbourne who won bronze in the slopestyle event at the 2022 Winter Olympics. She also won a bronze medal in slopestyle at the 2021 FIS Snowboard World Championships, and a bronze medal in big air at the 2023 world championships.

== Career ==
Born in Melbourne on 2 November 2000, Coady was raised in St. Kilda, Victoria, and began snowboarding with her siblings on weekends and holidays. She began competing at age 14. Coady participated at the FIS Freestyle Ski and Snowboarding World Championships 2017 in Sierra Nevada, Spain, where she competed in big air and in slopestyle.

She represented Australia at the 2018 Winter Olympics. At 17 years old, Coady was the youngest athlete on Australia's Olympic team in PyeongChang. She was set to make her Olympic debut in the slopestyle event, but tore her anterior cruciate ligament while undertaking a practice run in difficult conditions. The qualification heats for the slopestyle event were later cancelled due to strong winds.

Since 2020, Coady has been affiliated with the artistic collective Drain Gang.

At the 2021 World Championships in Aspen, Colorado, Coady won bronze in the slopestyle competition.

On 6 February 2022, she won the bronze medal in the slopestyle event at the 2022 Winter Olympics, behind Zoi Sadowski-Synnott and Julia Marino. She also qualified for the Olympic final in the big air event, where she placed ninth.

In the 2022-2023 competition season, Coady won bronze at the 2023 World Championships in Bakuriani, Georgia in the big air event and silver in the slopestyle event at the 2023 Winter X Games.

=== 2026 season ===
Coady was selected to represent Australia at the 2026 Winter Olympics in Italy. She finished seventh in the big air final alongside compatriot Meila Stalker (tenth).

== Results ==
=== Olympic Winter Games ===
As of 1 March 2026

Year	Age	Big Air	Slopestyle
(South Korea) 2018 Pyeongchang	17	–	DNS
(China) 2022 Beijing	21	9	3
(Italy) 2026 Milano Cortina	25	7	27

=== World Championships ===
As of 1 March 2026

Year	Age	Big Air	Slopestyle
(Spain) 2017 Sierra Nevada	16	21	11
(United States) 2021 Aspen	20	5	3
(Georgia (country)) 2023 Bakuriani	22	3	4
(Switzerland) 2025 Engadin	24	23	12

=== X Games ===
As of 1 March 2026

Year	Age	Big Air	Slopestyle	Knuckle Huck
(United States) 2022 Aspen	21	–	6	—N/a
(United States) 2023 Aspen	22	8	2	—N/a
(United States) 2026 Aspen	25	–	4	8

=== World Cup results by season ===
As of 1 March 2026

Season	Big Air					Slopestyle					Overall Park & Pipe				
Season	Events started	Wins	Pods	Points	Rank	Events started	Wins	Pods	Points	Rank	Events started	Wins	Pods	Points	Rank
2017–18	2	0	0	500	26	2	0	1	740	8	4	0	1	1240	26
2019–20	1	0	0	240	28	1	1	1	1000	8	2	1	1	1240	30
2020–21	1	0	0	9	22	3	0	2	165	3rd place, bronze medalist(s)	4	0	2	174	6
2021–22	0	–	–	–	–	2	1	1	150	8	2	1	1	150	14
2022–23	1	0	0	29	30	2	0	1	102	8	2	1	1	150	19
2023–24	1	0	1	80	10	1	0	0	50	14	2	0	1	130	20
2024–25	0	–	–	–	–	2	0	0	90	15	2	0	0	90	38
2025–26	2	0	0	82	12	1	0	0	40	11	3	0	0	122	19
