= Mia Brookes =

English snowboarder (born 2007)

Personal information
- Born: 19 January 2007 (age 19) Sandbach, Cheshire, England

Sport
- Sport: Snowboarding
- Events: Big Air, Slopestyle
Medal record
Women's snowboarding
Representing Great Britain
Junior World Championships
| Gold medal – first place | 2022 Leysin | Big Air |
| Silver medal – second place | 2022 Leysin | Slopestyle |
World Championships
| Gold medal – first place | 2023 Bakuriani | Slopestyle |
Winter X Games
| Gold medal – first place | 2026 Aspen | Slopestyle |
| Bronze medal – third place | 2025 Aspen | Slopestyle |
| Gold medal – first place | 2024 Aspen | Slopestyle |

Mia Brookes (born 19 January 2007) is an English snowboarder who won the slopestyle competition at the 2023 Freestyle World Championships. She has also won two slopestyle gold medals at the Winter X Games and two overall World Cup titles in big air.

== Early life ==
Brookes is from Sandbach, Cheshire, England. She learned to snowboard aged 18 months, at Kidsgrove ski centre in Stoke-on-Trent where her grandfather worked. Her parents spent five ski seasons in Chamonix, France when Brookes was young, and she also continued her snowboarding at Chill Factore. Brookes attended Sandbach High School; during the COVID-19 pandemic, she studied remotely so that she could compete in snowboard events in mainland Europe.

== Career ==
Brookes has trained in Laax, Switzerland, Livigno, Italy, and Hintertux, Austria. She joined the GB Snowsport programme at the age of 10, and aged 11, she competed at the 2018 British Snowboard Championships in Laax.

In December 2020, Brookes made her international debut, finishing second in a Europa Cup event in Piz Corvatsch, Switzerland. She was unable to compete in FIS Snowboard World Cup events until she was 15 years old. In 2022, she won the big air at the Junior World Championships, and finished runner-up in the slopestyle event. She was unable to qualify for the 2022 Winter Olympics, as she was below the permitted age.

Brookes finished second in the 2022–23 World Cup slopestyle event in Laax, and came sixth in the same discipline at the 2023 X Games. At the age of 16, she won the slopestyle at the 2023 World Championships. Her victory made her the youngest ever snowboard world champion and the first Briton to win a snowboard slopestyle world title. In her winning routine, she became the first woman to land a CAB 1440 in competition. Speaking about her successful Cab 1440 double grab, Brookes stated: "I'd tried it once before and this is the first time I've stomped it, so I'm super happy."

In October 2023, Brookes won a bronze medal in the Big Air at the World Cup meeting in Chur, Switzerland. Brookes was crowned overall champion of the 2023-24 edition of the big air World Cup, after finishing the fourth and final leg in the competition at Copper Mountain in third place. Her highest placing in the competition was second at the event in Edmonton. At the end of 2023, she was named Young Sportswoman of the Year by The Sunday Times, and awarded BBC Young Sports Personality of the Year. In January 2024, she won the gold medal in the slopestyle at the 2024 Winter X Games in Aspen, USA.

In September 2024, she won a World Cup silver medal in the slopestyle at Cardrona, New Zealand. The final scores were taken from qualifying after the final was cancelled due to hazardous conditions. The following month, she finished fifth in her opening big air World Cup event of the year in Switzerland. In December, she won her first ever World Cup gold medal with victory in the big air at Beijing. She then secured back-to-back victories in the big air after winning the next World Cup event in Klagenfurt, Austria. The following week, she finished third in the big air in Kreischberg, Austria. The result left her level in the overall big air World Cup standings with Mari Fukada. Later in January, she was unable to defend her X Games slopestyle title, finishing with a bronze medal.

In January 2025, she claimed her first World Cup slopestyle win with victory in Laax. Her success came one day prior to her 18th birthday. The following month, she recorded third-placed finishes in the slopestyle in both Aspen and Calgary, and also won her second consecutive Crystal Globe in the big air. Brookes did not compete at the final event of the series in Aspen and Fukada was unable to take advantage. The pair ended the series tied on 305 points but Brookes was awarded the trophy for recording more wins across the season. In March 2025, Brookes won the overall Snowboard Park and Pipe World Cup title after a season in which she claimed seven podium finishes including three victories. She finished 35 points clear of second-placed Fukada. At the 2025 World Championships, she finished sixth in the slopestyle.

Brookes missed the opening big air World Cup event in Secret Garden, China, but in December 2025, she claimed the fourth World Cup victory of her career after triumphing in the big air in Beijing. The following month, she won a gold medal at the 2026 X Games held in Aspen. She achieved victory in the women's snowboard slopestyle with a score of 96.33, her second career X Games gold medal. Brookes was named to the Great Britain team for the 2026 Winter Olympics in Milan-Cortina.

At the Games, Brookes qualified for the big air final in third position. In the final, she finished in fourth place. She recorded scores of 80.75 and 78.75 in her first two runs but her attempt to land a backside 1620 in her third run, never previously completed by a woman at an Olympic Games, was unsuccessful. Afterwards, she explained: "I could have done a 14 [1440] and maybe got fourth or third, but I also could have done a 16 and land it and won. But I’d rather be in fourth with a 16 than fourth with a 14, so I’m happy I tried it." She then competed in the slopestyle event but failed to qualify for the final.

Returning to the World Cup circuit, Brookes secured her fifth World Cup gold medal by triumphing in the slopestyle in Flachau. She scored 73.25 to finish ahead of second-placed Anna Gasser.

== Major results ==
=== Olympics timeline ===
| Year | Event | Location | Position | Ref |
|---|---|---|---|---|
| 2026 | Big Air | (Italy) Milan-Cortina | 4th | |
| 2026 | Slopestyle | (Italy) Milan-Cortina | DNQ for final | |

=== World Championships ===
| Event | Slopestyle | Big Air |
|---|---|---|
| 2023 Bakuriani | Gold | 5th |
| 2025 Engadin | 6th | 5th |

=== X Games medals ===
| Year | Event | Location | Position | Ref |
|---|---|---|---|---|
| 2024 | Slopestyle | (United States) Aspen | 1st | |
| 2025 | Slopestyle | (United States) Aspen | 3rd | |
| 2026 | Slopestyle | (United States) Aspen | 1st | |

=== World Cup ===
| Season | Freestyle overall | | Slopestyle | | Big Air | | Ref |
| Season | Points | Position | Points | Position | Points | Position | |
|---|---|---|---|---|---|---|---|
| 2022–23 | 204 | 10th | 130 | 3rd | 74 | 14th | |
| 2023–24 | 282 | 6th | 32 | 19th | 250 | 1st | |
| 2024–25 | 500 | 1st | 300 | 2nd | 305 | 1st | |

=== World Cup podiums ===
| Season | Date | Location | Discipline | Place | Ref |
|---|---|---|---|---|---|
| 2022–23 | 22 January 2023 | (Switzerland) Laax | Slopestyle | 2nd | |
| 2023–24 | 21 October 2023 | (Switzerland) Chur | Big Air | 3rd | |
| 2023–24 | 9 December 2023 | (Canada) Edmonton | Big Air | 2nd | |
| 2023–24 | 15 December 2023 | (United States) Copper Mountain | Big Air | 3rd | |
| 2024–25 | 2 September 2024 | (New Zealand) Cardrona | Slopestyle | 2nd | |
| 2024–25 | 1 December 2024 | (China) Beijing | Big Air | 1st | |
| 2024–25 | 5 January 2025 | (Austria) Klagenfurt | Big Air | 1st | |
| 2024–25 | 11 January 2025 | (Austria) Kreischberg | Big Air | 3rd | |
| 2024–25 | 18 January 2025 | (Switzerland) Laax | Slopestyle | 1st | |
| 2024–25 | 2 February 2025 | (United States) Aspen | Slopestyle | 3rd | |
| 2024–25 | 22 February 2025 | (Canada) Calgary | Slopestyle | 3rd | |
| 2025–26 | 6 December 2025 | (China) Beijing | Big Air | 1st | |
| 2025–26 | 21 March 2026 | (Austria) Flachau | Slopestyle | 1st | |
