= Snowboarding at the 2020 Winter Youth Olympics – Girls' slopestyle =

Girls' slopestyle at the III Winter Youth Olympic Games
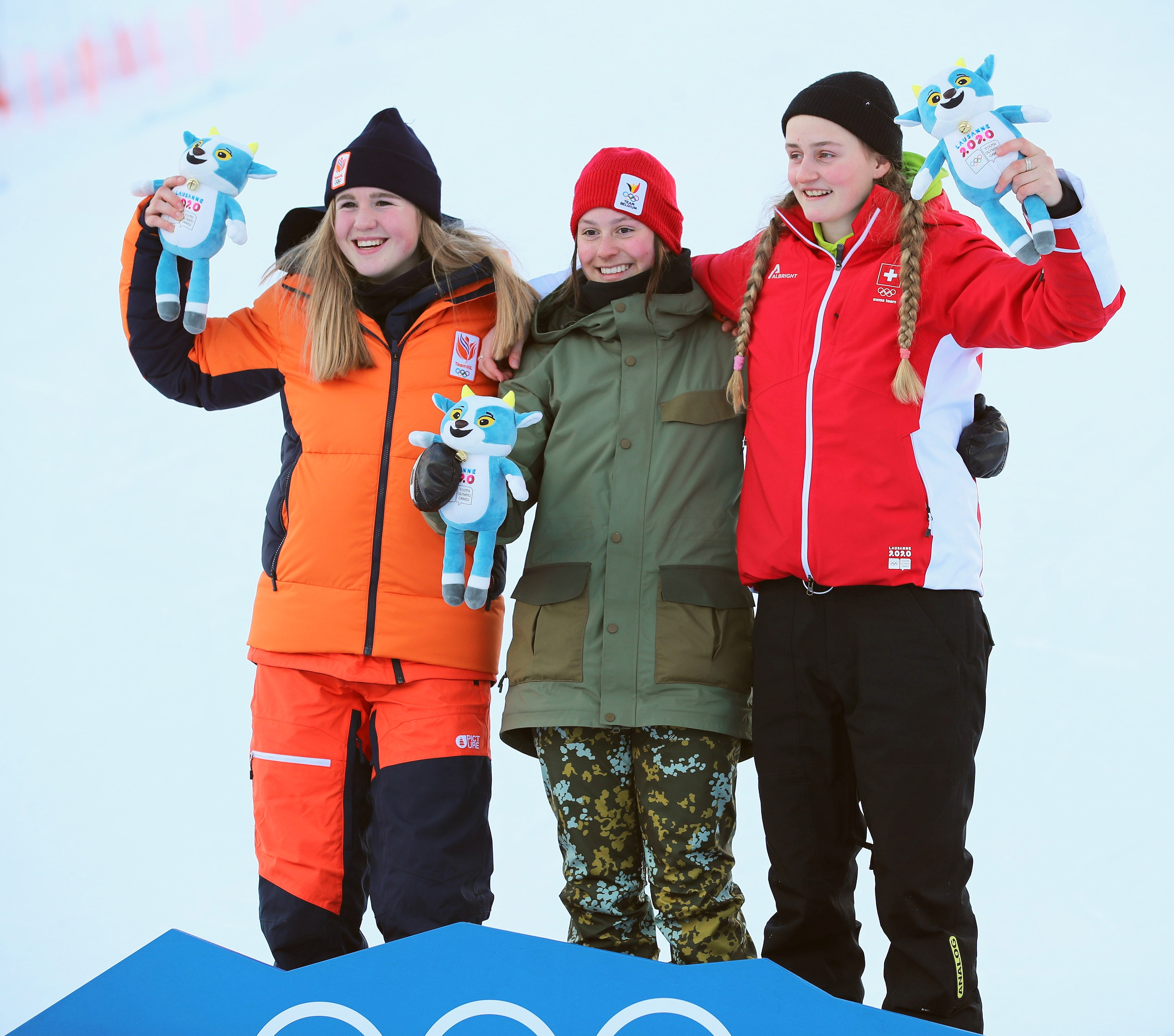
- Venue: Leysin Park & Pipe
- Dates: 18 January
- Competitors: 22 from 15 nations
- Winning points: 94.00

Medalists
1st place, gold medalist(s)		Evy Poppe	Belgium
2nd place, silver medalist(s)		Melissa Peperkamp	Netherlands
3rd place, bronze medalist(s)		Bianca Gisler	Switzerland

The girls' slopestyle event in snowboarding at the 2020 Winter Youth Olympics took place on 18 January at the Leysin Park & Pipe.

== Qualification ==
The qualification was started at 09:30.

Rank	Bib	Name	Country	Run 1	Run 2	Best	Notes
1	2	Evy Poppe	Belgium	46.25	83.50	83.50	Q
2	1	Melissa Peperkamp	Netherlands	76.50	18.75	76.50	Q
3	6	Ty Schnorrbusch	United States	52.25	61.75	61.75	Q
4	22	Bianca Gisler	Switzerland	51.75	13.50	51.75	Q
5	15	Kanami Okuyama	Japan	49.50	23.00	49.50	Q
6	14	Hinari Asanuma	Japan	18.00	47.00	47.00	Q
7	20	Stine Espeli Olsen	Norway	42.00	34.25	42.00	Q
8	3	Courtney Rummel	United States	41.75	22.75	41.75	Q
9	13	Marie Kreisingerová	Czech Republic	40.50	37.50	40.50	Q
10	4	Eveliina Taka	Finland	32.00	38.50	38.50	Q
11	7	Andie Gendron	Canada	35.25	26.25	35.25	Q
12	24	Marilù Poluzzi	Italy	33.25	7.00	33.25	Q
13	21	Eva Hanicová	Slovakia	16.00	29.00	29.00	
14	8	Kamilla Kozuback	Canada	26.00	11.50	26.00	
15	12	Lily Jekel	Australia	7.25	22.00	22.00	
16	10	Kiara Zung	Austria	17.00	19.50	19.50	
17	17	Morena Poggi	Argentina	19.00	12.50	19.00	
18	18	Alexandra Chen	Australia	13.00	8.50	13.00	
19	16	Juliette Pelchat	Canada	12.00	12.75	12.75	
20	19	Bettina Roll	Norway	6.25	8.00	8.00	
21	23	Guo Junyan	China	7.75	1.50	7.75	
22	11	Veera Immonen	Finland	2.00	DNS	2.00	
	5	Annika Morgan	Germany	Did not start			
	9	Mona Danuser	Switzerland	Did not start			

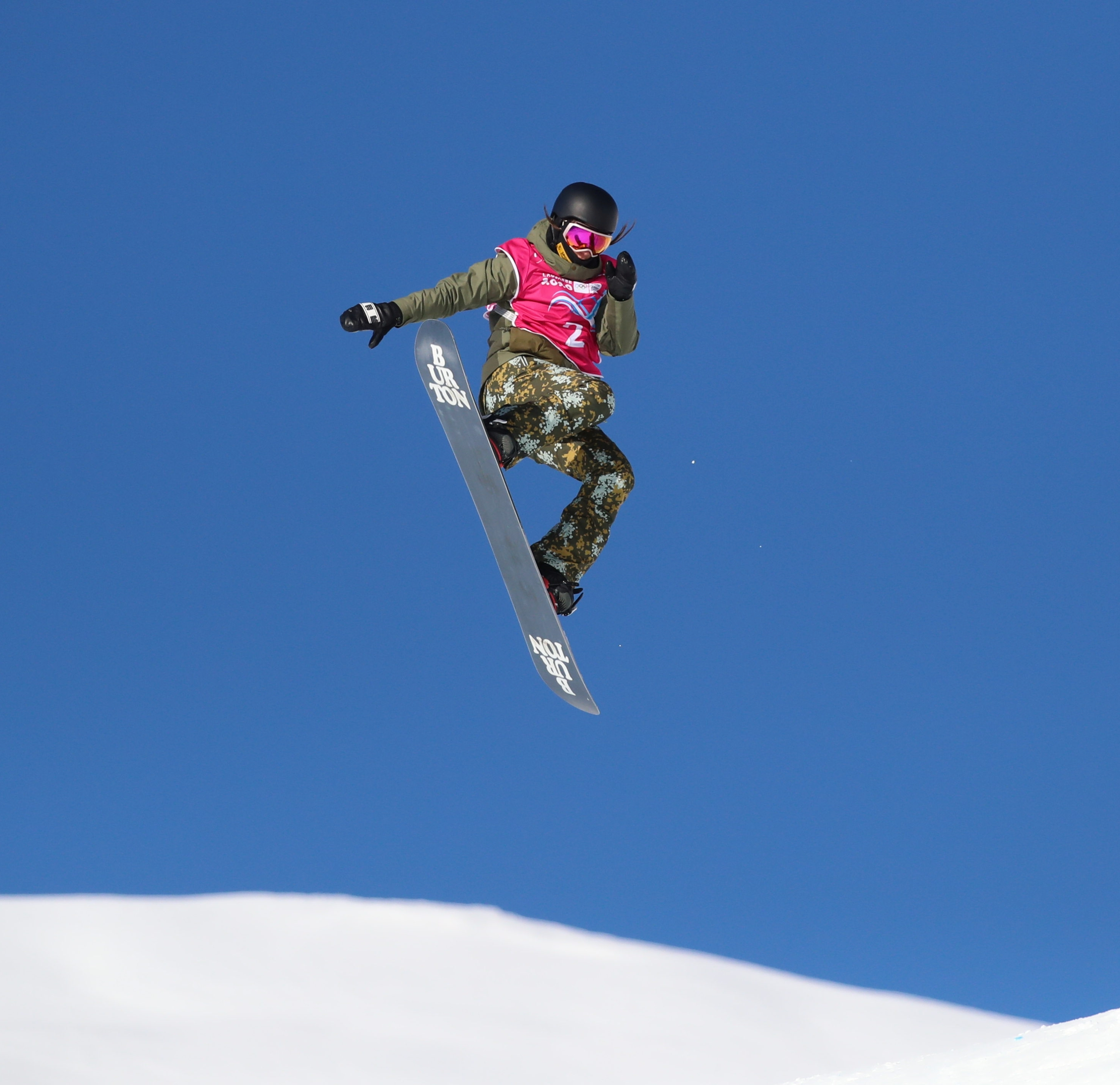
Evy Poppe

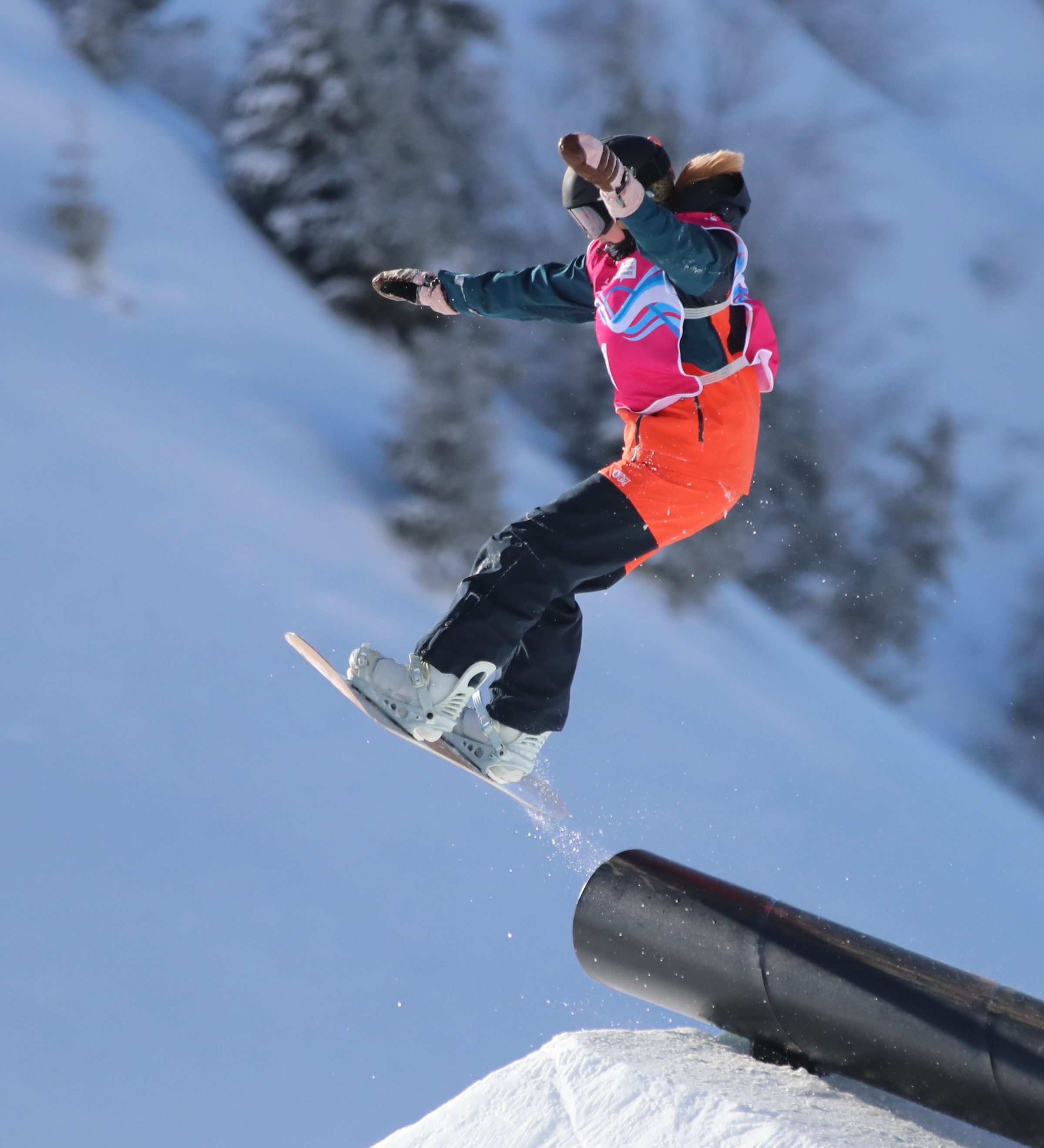
Melissa Peperkamp

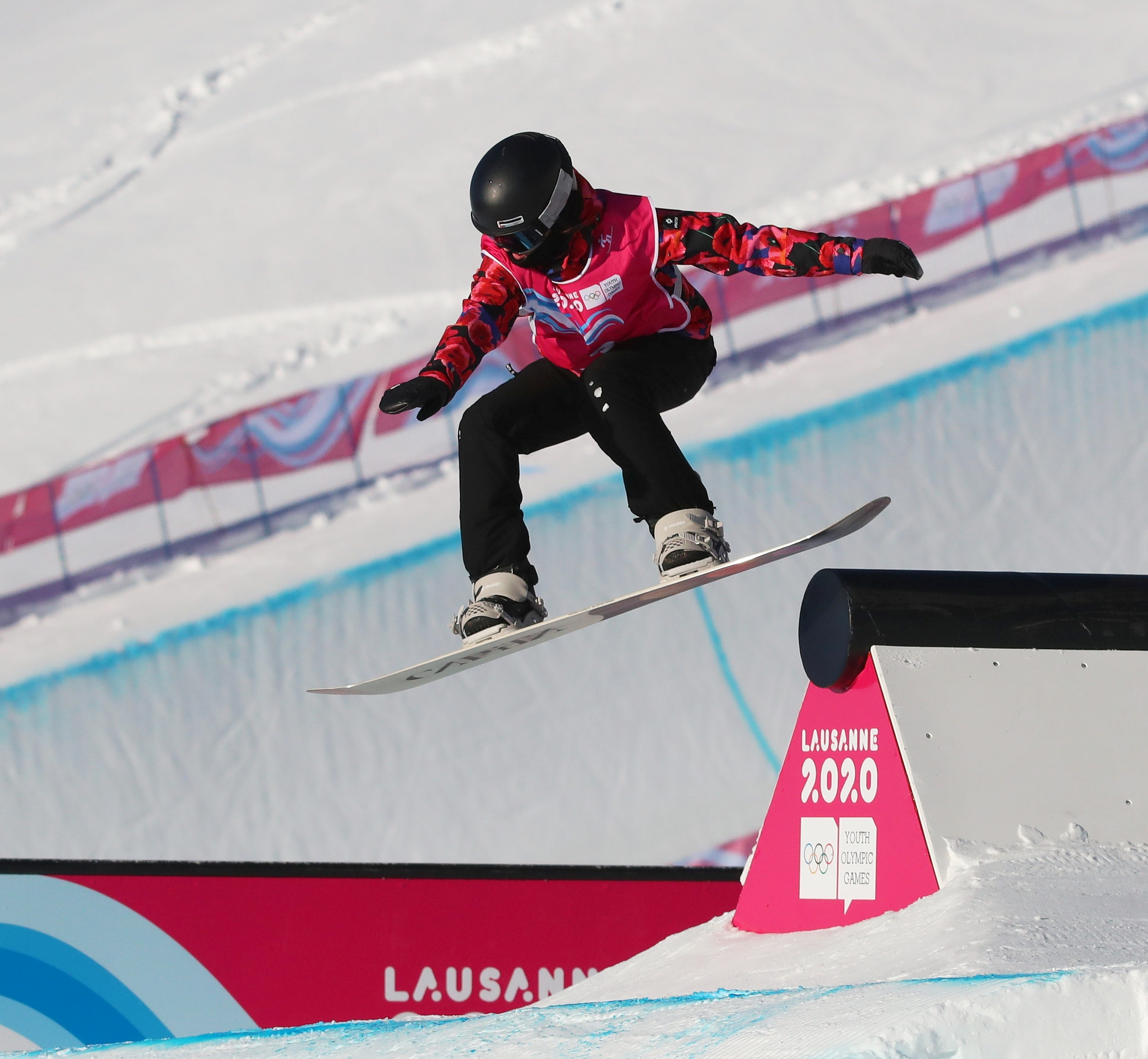
Ty Schnorrbusch

== Final ==
The final was started at 13:55.

Rank	Start order	Bib	Name	Country	Run 1	Run 2	Run 3	Best
1st place, gold medalist(s)	12	2	Evy Poppe	Belgium	88.75	22.25	94.00	94.00
2nd place, silver medalist(s)	11	1	Melissa Peperkamp	Netherlands	79.25	91.75	16.25	91.75
3rd place, bronze medalist(s)	9	22	Bianca Gisler	Switzerland	70.25	12.75	78.25	78.25
4	7	14	Hinari Asanuma	Japan	75.00	10.25	28.00	75.00
5	8	15	Kanami Okuyama	Japan	64.25	25.00	17.75	64.25
6	10	6	Ty Schnorrbusch	United States	59.75	30.25	15.50	59.75
7	5	3	Courtney Rummel	United States	53.25	DNS	DNS	53.25
8	3	4	Eveliina Taka	Finland	39.25	27.25	27.25	39.25
9	2	7	Andie Gendron	Canada	19.50	16.25	28.50	28.50
10	6	20	Stine Espeli Olsen	Norway	8.75	DNS	DNS	8.75
11	4	13	Marie Kreisingerová	Czech Republic	5.50	DNS	DNS	5.50
	1	24	Marilù Poluzzi	Italy	Did not start			

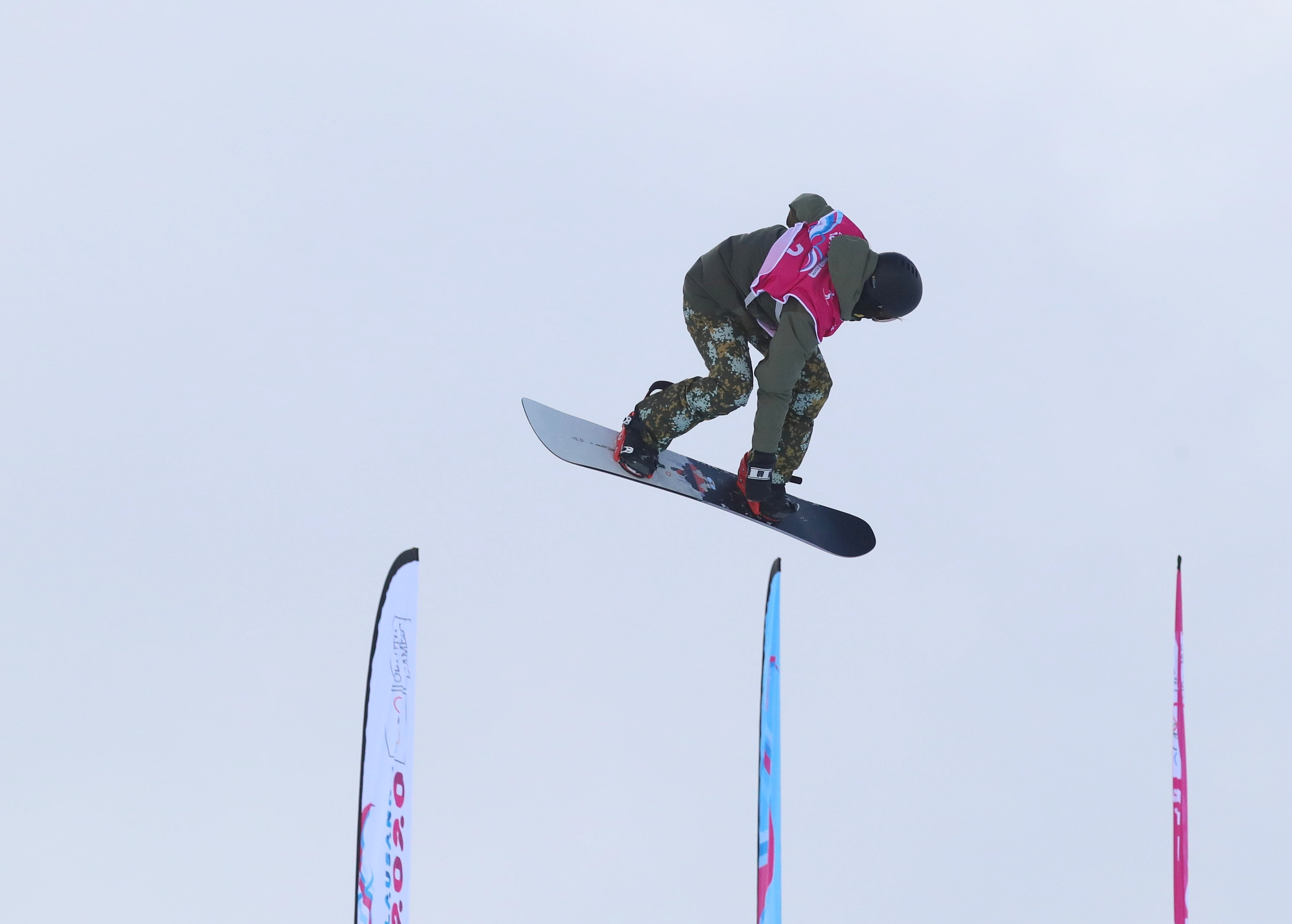
Evy Poppe

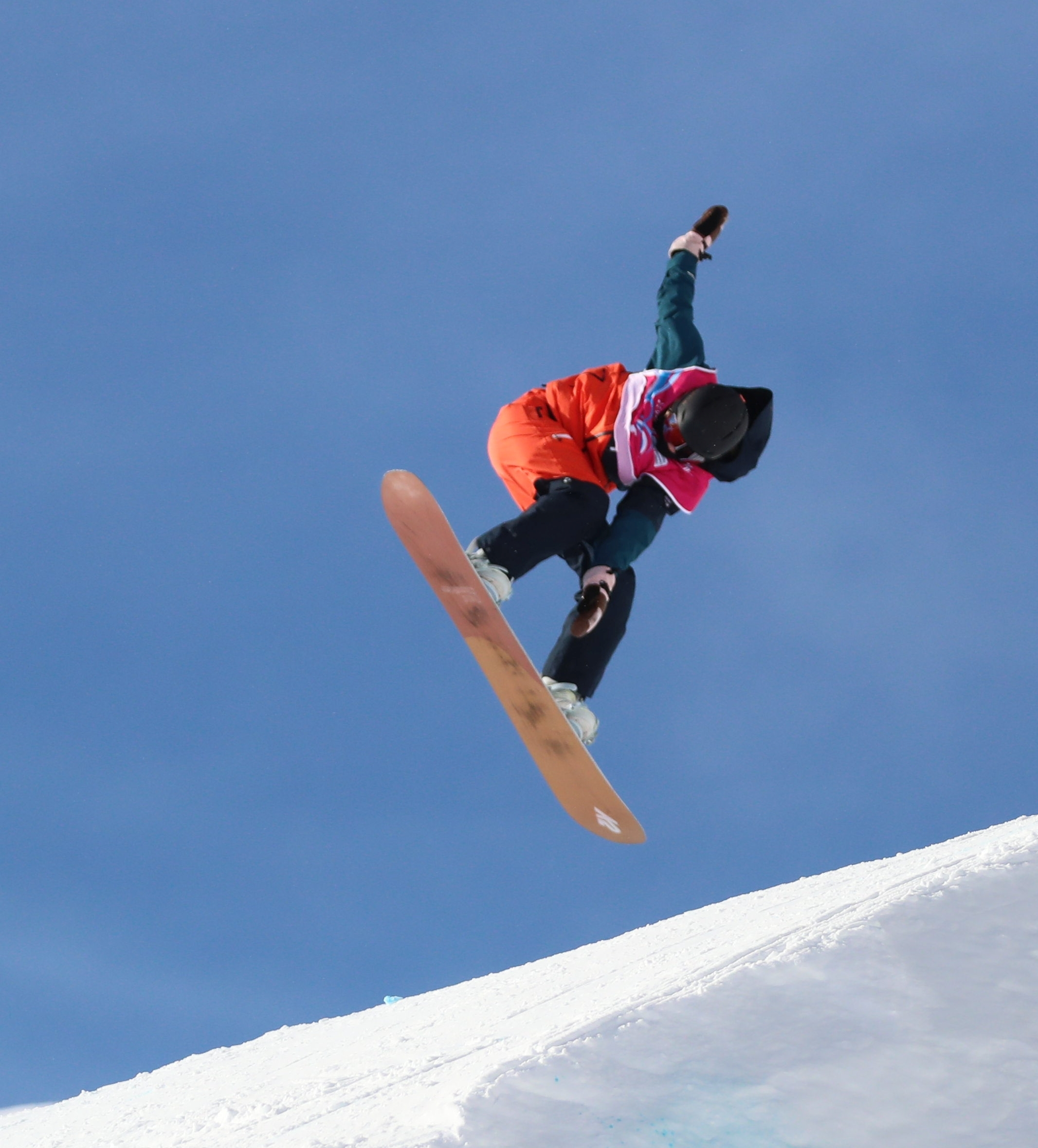
Melissa Peperkamp

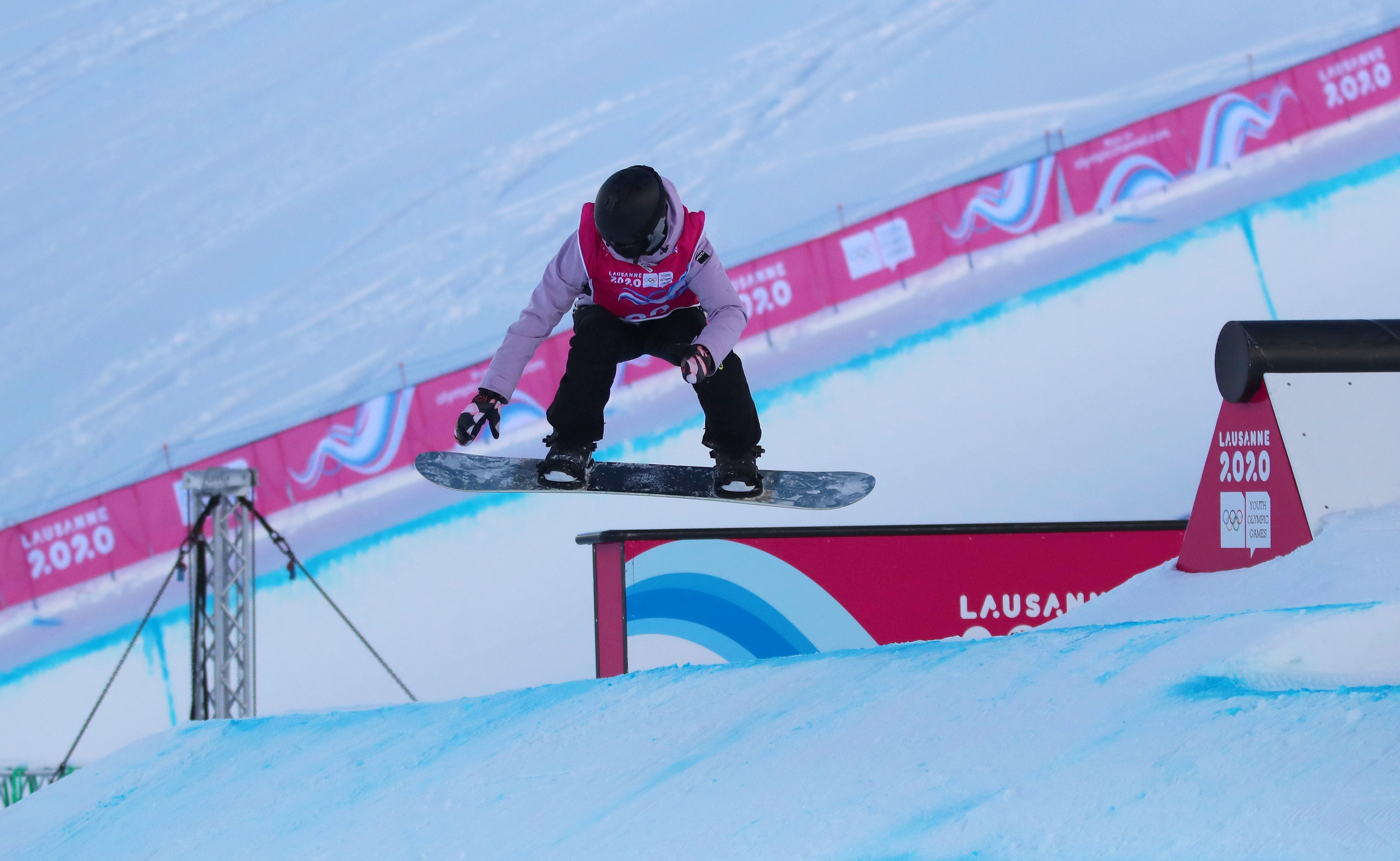
Bianca Gisler
