= Coratti =

Coratti is an Italian surname. Notable people with the surname include:

- Edwin Coratti (born 1991), Italian snowboarder
- Jasmin Coratti (born 2001), Italian snowboarder
