= FIS Freestyle Ski and Snowboarding World Championships 2025 – Mixed snowboard parallel slalom =

Mixed parallel slalom team at the FIS Freestyle Ski and Snowboarding World Championships 2025
- Location: Engadin, Switzerland
- Dates: 23 March
- Competitors: 70 from 16 nations
- Teams: 35

Medalists
gold medal	Maurizio Bormolini; Elisa Caffont	Italy
silver medal	Gabriel Messner; Jasmin Coratti	Italy
bronze medal	Andreas Prommegger; Sabine Payer	Austria

The Mixed parallel slalom team competition at the FIS Freestyle Ski and Snowboarding World Championships 2025 was held on 23 March 2025.

== Results ==
=== Qualification ===
Rank	Bib	Country	Athletes	Blue course	Red course	Total
1	21	Italy 1	Maurizio Bormolini		34.40	1:12.29
1	21	Italy 1	Elisa Caffont	37.89		1:12.29
2	20	Italy 3	Gabriel Messner	34.32		1:12.39
2	20	Italy 3	Jasmin Coratti		38.07	1:12.39
3	31	Switzerland 1	Dario Caviezel		34.73	1:12.43
3	31	Switzerland 1	Julie Zogg	37.70		1:12.43
4	18	Austria 2	Andreas Prommegger	34.24		1:12.64
4	18	Austria 2	Sabine Payer		38.40	1:12.64
5	19	United States 1	Cody Winters		33.50	1:13.10
5	19	United States 1	Iris Pflum	39.60		1:13.10
6	22	Italy 2	Aaron March	35.05		1:13.23
6	22	Italy 2	Elisa Fava		38.18	1:13.23
7	30	Canada 1	Ben Heldman	34.93		1:13.71
7	30	Canada 1	Aurélie Moisan		38.78	1:13.71
8	17	Germany 1	Stefan Baumeister		36.17	1:14.04
8	17	Germany 1	Ramona Theresia Hofmeister	37.87		1:14.04
9	32	Austria 1	Arvid Auner	36.43		1:15.15
9	32	Austria 1	Claudia Riegler		38.72	1:15.15
10	24	Canada 2	Arnaud Gaudet	35.43		1:15.23
10	24	Canada 2	Kaylie Buck		39.80	1:15.23
11	35	Czech Republic 1	Kryštof Minárik		35.18	1:15.63
11	35	Czech Republic 1	Adéla Keclíková	40.45		1:15.63
12	37	China 2	Ban Xuefu		35.69	1:15.72
12	37	China 2	Peng Cheng	40.03		1:15.72
13	29	South Korea 2	Lee Sang-ho		34.77	1:15.79
13	29	South Korea 2	Jeong Hae-rim	41.02		1:15.79
14	27	Germany 2	Elias Huber		36.80	1:16.18
14	27	Germany 2	Cheyenne Loch	39.38		1:16.18
15	25	Slovenia 1	Tim Mastnak		35.34	1:16.20
15	25	Slovenia 1	Gloria Kotnik	40.86		1:16.20
16	41	Bulgaria 1	Tervel Zamfirov		35.64	1:16.31
16	41	Bulgaria 1	Malena Zamfirova	40.67		1:16.31
17	36	China 1	Bi Ye	36.63		1:17.35
17	36	China 1	Bai Xinhui		40.72	1:17.35
18	48	Ukraine 2	Mykhailo Kabaliuk	37.93		1:18.01
18	48	Ukraine 2	Nadiia Hapatyn		40.08	1:18.01
19	38	Ukraine 1	Mykhailo Kharuk	36.86		1:18.69
19	38	Ukraine 1	Annamari Dancha		41.83	1:18.69
20	34	China 3	Sun Huan	36.53		1:18.81
20	34	China 3	Gong Naiying		42.28	1:18.81
21	33	Poland 1	Michał Nowaczyk		37.86	1:18.99
21	33	Poland 1	Aleksandra Król-Walas	41.13		1:18.99
22	40	United States 2	Walker Overstake	36.73		1:19.02
22	40	United States 2	Kaiya Kizuka		42.29	1:19.02
23	46	Poland 2	Anatol Kulpinski	40.05		1:20.24
23	46	Poland 2	Weronika Dawidek		40.19	1:20.24
24	43	Poland 3	Andrzej Gąsienica-Daniel		39.86	1:20.60
24	43	Poland 3	Maria Bukowska-Chyc	40.74		1:20.60
25	47	Australia 1	Harvey Edmanson		37.48	1:21.68
25	47	Australia 1	Millie Bongiorno	44.20		1:21.68
26	49	Ukraine 3	Andrii Kabaliuk		38.27	1:23.85
26	49	Ukraine 3	Vita Bodnaruk	45.58		1:23.85
27	45	Czech Republic 2	Adam Počinek		40.42	1:23.91
27	45	Czech Republic 2	Klára Šonková	43.49		1:23.91
28	39	Japan 1	Masaki Shiba		35.43	1:24.63
28	39	Japan 1	Asa Toyoda	49.20		1:24.63
29	44	United States 3	Ryan Rosencranz	38.31		1:25.46
29	44	United States 3	Alexa Bullis		47.15	1:25.46
30	28	Germany 3	Ole-Mikkel Prantl	38.19		1:27.43
30	28	Germany 3	Melanie Hochreiter		49.24	1:27.43
31	51	Turkey 2	Emre Boydak		41.47	1:32.12
31	51	Turkey 2	İrem Gezer	50.65		1:32.12
32	50	Turkey 1	Ömer Faruk Keleşoğlu	42.99		1:33.39
32	50	Turkey 1	Selin Gülce Güler		50.40	1:33.39
33	23	Austria 3	Benjamin Karl		35.86	
33	23	Austria 3	Martina Ankele	DSQ		
34	42	Czech Republic 3	Filip Mareš	DNF		
34	42	Czech Republic 3	Zuzana Maděrová		38.40	
35	26	Switzerland 2	Gian Casanova	DSQ		
35	26	Switzerland 2	Flurina Neva Bätschi		39.51	

=== Bracket ===
1/8 finals
Austria 2
South Korea 1	+0.72
United States 1
China 2	DNF
Austria 1
Germany 1	+0.26
Italy 1
Bulgaria 1	DNF
Italy 3
Slovenia 1	DNF
Canada 1
Canada 2	DNF
Italy 2
Czech Republic 1	+1.01
Switzerland 1
Germany 2	DNF

Quarterfinals
Austria 2
United States 1	+0.41
Austria 1	+0.21
Italy 1
Italy 3
Canada 1	+0.89
Italy 2	+5.54
Switzerland 1

Semifinals
Austria 2	+0.51
Italy 1
Italy 3
Switzerland 1	DSQ

Final
Italy 1
Italy 3	+0.92
Third place
Austria 2
Switzerland 1	+0.06
