= 2024–25 FIS Snowboard World Cup =

Competitive snowboarding season

Discipline	Men	Women
Parallel Overall	(Italy) Maurizio Bormolini (1)	(Japan) Tsubaki Miki (1)
Parallel slalom	(Austria) Arvid Auner (1)	(Japan) Tsubaki Miki (1)
Parallel giant slalom	(Italy) Maurizio Bormolini (1)	(Japan) Tsubaki Miki (1)
Snowboard Cross	(Canada) Éliot Grondin (2)	(France) Léa Casta (1)
Park & Pipe Overall	(Japan) Taiga Hasegawa (1)	(United Kingdom) Mia Brookes (1)
Halfpipe	(Japan) Ruka Hirano (3)	(United States) Maddie Mastro (1)
Slopestyle	(Canada) Cameron Spalding (1)	(New Zealand) Zoi Sadowski-Synnott (1)
Big Air	(Japan) Taiga Hasegawa (1)	(United Kingdom) Mia Brookes (2)
- Nations Cup Overall: Japan

Competition
Edition	31st	31st
Locations	30	30
Individual	42	42
Mixed	4	4
Cancelled	2	2

The 2024–25 FIS Snowboard World Cup, organized by the International Ski Federation (FIS), was the 31st World Cup in snowboarding for men and women.

The season started on 2 September 2024 in Cardrona, New Zealand and concluded on 6 April 2025 in Mont-Sainte-Anne, Canada.

This season included six disciplines: parallel slalom, parallel giant slalom, snowboard cross, halfpipe, slopestyle and big air.

== Map of World Cup hosts ==
Europe	Switzerland
Europe	Austria
New Zealand
Asia	North America

== Men ==
=== Calendar ===
==== Snowboard Cross (SBX) ====
#	Date	Place	Winner	Second	Third	Discipline leader	R.
1	14 December 2024	(Italy) Cervinia	(Austria) Jakob Dusek	(Australia) Cameron Bolton	(Italy) Lorenzo Sommariva	(Austria) Jakob Dusek	
	24 January 2025	(Czech Republic) Dolní Morava	Cancelled				
2	1 February 2025	(China) Beidahu	(Canada) Éliot Grondin	(Austria) Alessandro Hämmerle	(France) Merlin Surget	(Canada) Éliot Grondin	
3	2 February 2025	(China) Beidahu	(Canada) Éliot Grondin	(Germany) Leon Ulbricht	(France) Loan Bozzolo	(Canada) Éliot Grondin	
4	15 February 2025	(Italy) Cortina d'Ampezzo	(France) Aidan Chollet	(Germany) Kurt Hoshino	(United States) Cody Winters	(Canada) Éliot Grondin	
5	1 March 2025	(Turkey) Erzurum	(Germany) Leon Ulbricht	(Canada) Éliot Grondin	(United States) Nick Baumgartner	(Canada) Éliot Grondin	
6	8 March 2025	(Georgia (country)) Gudauri	(Austria) Jakob Dusek	(Australia) Adam Lambert	(Canada) Éliot Grondin	(Canada) Éliot Grondin	
7	9 March 2025	(Georgia (country)) Gudauri	(France) Julien Tomas	(Austria) Lukas Pachner	(France) Loan Bozzolo	(Canada) Éliot Grondin	
8	21 March 2025	(Austria) Montafon	(France) Loan Bozzolo	(Australia) Adam Lambert	(France) Aidan Chollet	(Canada) Éliot Grondin	
9	5 April 2025	(Canada) Mt. St. Anne	(Austria) Jakob Dusek	(Canada) Éliot Grondin	(United States) Nathan Pare	(Canada) Éliot Grondin	
10	6 April 2025	(Canada) Mt. St. Anne	(Canada) Éliot Grondin	(France) Aidan Chollet	(France) Loan Bozzolo	(Canada) Éliot Grondin	

==== Parallel (PSL/PGS) ====
#	Date	Place	Event	Winner	Second	Third	Discipline leader	R.
1	30 November 2024	(China) Mylin	PGS	(Italy) Edwin Coratti	(South Korea) Kim Sang-kyum	(South Korea) Lee Sang-ho	(Italy) Edwin Coratti	
2	1 December 2024	(China) Mylin	PSL	(Italy) Maurizio Bormolini	(Austria) Benjamin Karl	(Italy) Gabriel Messner	(Italy) Maurizio Bormolini	
3	7 December 2024	(China) Yanqing	PGS	(Slovenia) Tim Mastnak	(Italy) Maurizio Bormolini	(Italy) Mirko Felicetti	(Italy) Maurizio Bormolini	
4	8 December 2024	(China) Yanqing	PSL	(Italy) Daniele Bagozza	(Italy) Gabriel Messner	(Austria) Andreas Prommegger	(Slovenia) Tim Mastnak	
5	12 December 2024	(Italy) Carezza	PGS	(Bulgaria) Radoslav Yankov	(Slovenia) Tim Mastnak	(Austria) Benjamin Karl	(Slovenia) Tim Mastnak	
6	14 December 2024	(Italy) Cortina d'Ampezzo	PGS	(Italy) Daniele Bagozza	(Italy) Aaron March	(Austria) Alexander Payer	(Slovenia) Tim Mastnak	
7	21 December 2024	(Switzerland) Davos	PSL	(Austria) Arvid Auner	(Switzerland) Dario Caviezel	(Austria) Fabian Obmann	(Italy) Daniele Bagozza	
8	11 January 2025	(Switzerland) Scuol	PGS	(Italy) Maurizio Bormolini	(Austria) Dominik Burgstaller	(Austria) Andreas Prommegger	(Italy) Maurizio Bormolini	
9	14 January 2025	(Austria) Bad Gastein	PSL	(Italy) Aaron March	(Austria) Andreas Prommegger	(United States) Cody Winters	(Italy) Maurizio Bormolini	
10	18 January 2025	(Bulgaria) Bansko	PGS	(Austria) Andreas Prommegger	(Austria) Benjamin Karl	(Italy) Gabriel Messner	(Austria) Andreas Prommegger	
11	19 January 2025	(Bulgaria) Bansko	PGS	(Switzerland) Dario Caviezel	(Italy) Gabriel Messner	(Bulgaria) Radoslav Yankov	(Austria) Andreas Prommegger	
12	25 January 2025	(Slovenia) Rogla	PGS	(Italy) Maurizio Bormolini	(Germany) Elias Huber	(Italy) Aaron March	(Italy) Maurizio Bormolini	
13	15 February 2025	(Canada) Val. St. Come	PGS	(Slovenia) Žan Košir	(Austria) Benjamin Karl	(Bulgaria) Radoslav Yankov	(Italy) Maurizio Bormolini	
14	16 February 2025	(Canada) Val. St. Come	PGS	(Germany) Elias Huber	(Italy) Roland Fischnaller	(Italy) Maurizio Bormolini	(Italy) Maurizio Bormolini	
15	1 March 2025	(Poland) Krynica	PGS	(Italy) Roland Fischnaller	(South Korea) Lee Sang-ho	(Italy) Maurizio Bormolini	(Italy) Maurizio Bormolini	
16	2 March 2025	(Poland) Krynica	PGS	(Austria) Andreas Prommegger	(Italy) Maurizio Bormolini	(South Korea) Kim Sang-kyum	(Italy) Maurizio Bormolini	
17	15 March 2025	(Germany) Winterberg	PSL	(Austria) Matthäus Pink	(Austria) Arvid Auner	(Italy) Maurizio Bormolini	(Italy) Maurizio Bormolini	

==== Halfpipe (HP) ====
#	Date	Place	Winner	Second	Third	Discipline leader	R.
1	8 December 2024	(China) Secret Garden	(Japan) Yuto Totsuka	(Australia) Scotty James	(Japan) Ryusei Yamada	(Japan) Yuto Totsuka	
2	20 December 2024	(United States) Copper	(Japan) Ayumu Hirano	(Japan) Yuto Totsuka	(Japan) Ruka Hirano	(Japan) Yuto Totsuka	
3	18 January 2025	(Switzerland) Laax	(Australia) Scotty James	(Japan) Ruka Hirano	(Japan) Ayumu Hirano	(Japan) Yuto Totsuka	
4	1 February 2025	(United States) Aspen	(Japan) Ruka Hirano	(Japan) Ayumu Hirano	(Japan) Ryusei Yamada	(Japan) Ayumu Hirano	
5	21 February 2025	(Canada) Calgary	(Japan) Ruka Hirano	(Japan) Yuto Totsuka	(United States) Alessandro Barbieri	(Japan) Ruka Hirano	

==== Slopestyle (SS) ====
#	Date	Place	Winner	Second	Third	Discipline leader	R.
1	2 September 2024	(New Zealand) Cardrona	(Canada) Cameron Spalding	(Norway) Mons Røisland	(New Zealand) Rocco Jamieson	(Canada) Cameron Spalding	
2	18 January 2025	(Switzerland) Laax	(Canada) Cameron Spalding	(United States) Redmond Gerard	(Germany) Noah Vicktor	(Canada) Cameron Spalding	
3	2 February 2025	(United States) Aspen	(Canada) Francis Jobin	(China) Su Yiming	(United States) Sean FitzSimons	(Canada) Cameron Spalding	
4	22 February 2025	(Canada) Calgary	(United States) Oliver Martin	(United States) Redmond Gerard	(Norway) Marcus Kleveland	(Canada) Cameron Spalding	
	14 March 2025	(Austria) Flachauwinkl	Cancelled				

==== Big Air (BA) ====
#	Date	Place	Winner	Second	Third	Discipline leader	R.
1	19 October 2024	(Switzerland) Chur	(Japan) Taiga Hasegawa	(New Zealand) Rocco Jamieson	(France) Romain Allemand	(Japan) Taiga Hasegawa	
2	1 December 2024	(China) Beijing	(Japan) Hiroto Ogiwara	(Italy) Ian Matteoli	(China) Yang Wenlong	(Japan) Hiroto Ogiwara	
3	5 January 2025	(Austria) Klagenfurt	(Japan) Taiga Hasegawa	(Italy) Ian Matteoli	(Norway) Øyvind Kirkhus	(Japan) Taiga Hasegawa	
4	11 January 2025	(Austria) Kreischberg	(China) Yang Wenlong	(Japan) Taiga Hasegawa	(Japan) Kira Kimura	(Japan) Taiga Hasegawa	
5	6 February 2025	(United States) Aspen	(Canada) Eli Bouchard	(Japan) Taiga Hasegawa	(Japan) Yuto Miyamura	(Japan) Taiga Hasegawa	

=== Standings ===
==== Snowboard Cross ====
Rank	after all 10 events	Points
	(Canada) Eliot Grondin	684
2	(France) Loan Bozzolo	473
3	(Austria) Jakob Dusek	444
4	(France) Aidan Chollet	407
5	(France) Julien Tomas	322

==== Parallel Overall (PSL/PGS) ====
Rank	after all 17 events	Points
	(Italy) Maurizio Bormolini	910
2	(Austria) Andreas Prommegger	731
3	(Italy) Daniele Bagozza	594
4	(Italy) Gabriel Messner	591
5	(Austria) Benjamin Karl	565

==== Parallel slalom ====
Rank	after all 5 events	Points
	(Austria) Arvid Auner	299
2	(Italy) Gabriel Messner	252
3	(Italy) Daniele Bagozza	237
4	(Austria) Andreas Prommegger	236
5	(Italy) Maurizio Bormolini	218

==== Parallel giant slalom ====
Rank	after all 12 events	Points
	(Italy) Maurizio Bormolini	692
2	(Austria) Andreas Prommegger	495
3	(Bulgaria) Radoslav Yankov	455
4	(Italy) Edwin Coratti	416
5	(Germany) Elias Huber	410

==== Freestyle overall (BA/SS/HP) ====
Rank	after 14 of 15 events	Points
1	(Japan) Taiga Hasegawa	439
2	(Japan) Ruka Hirano	385
3	(Japan) Yuto Totsuka	360
4	(Japan) Ayumu Hirano	290
5	(Australia) Scotty James	275

==== Halfpipe ====
Rank	after all 5 events	Points
	(Japan) Ruka Hirano	340
2	(Japan) Yuto Totsuka	310
3	(Japan) Ayumu Hirano	290
4	(Australia) Scotty James	275
5	(Japan) Ryusei Yamada	175

==== Slopestyle ====
Rank	after 4 of 5 events	Points
1	(Canada) Cameron Spalding	230
2	(United States) Redmond Gerard	192
3	(China) Su Yiming	186
4	(Norway) Mons Røisland	138
5	(Canada) Francis Jobin	126

==== Big Air ====
Rank	after all 5 events	Points
	(Japan) Taiga Hasegawa	360
2	(Italy) Ian Matteoli	210
3	(China) Yang Wenlong	204
4	(Norway) Øyvind Kirkhus	181
5	(Japan) Hiroto Ogiwara	141

== Women ==
=== Calendar ===
==== Snowboard Cross (SBX) ====
#	Date	Place	Winner	Second	Third	Discipline leader	R.
1	14 December 2024	(Italy) Cervinia	(France) Léa Casta	(Australia) Josie Baff	(France) Maja-Li Iafrate Danielsson	(France) Léa Casta	
	24 January 2025	(Czech Republic) Dolní Morava	Cancelled				
2	1 February 2025	(China) Beidahu	(United Kingdom) Charlotte Bankes	(Italy) Michela Moioli	(France) Léa Casta	(United Kingdom) Charlotte Bankes	
3	2 February 2025	(China) Beidahu	(United Kingdom) Charlotte Bankes	(Australia) Josie Baff	(Switzerland) Sina Siegenthaler	(United Kingdom) Charlotte Bankes	
4	15 February 2025	(Italy) Cortina d'Ampezzo	(United Kingdom) Charlotte Bankes	(France) Léa Casta	(France) Manon Petit Lenoir	(United Kingdom) Charlotte Bankes	
5	1 March 2025	(Turkey) Erzurum	(United Kingdom) Charlotte Bankes	(France) Léa Casta	(Australia) Josie Baff	(United Kingdom) Charlotte Bankes	
6	8 March 2025	(Georgia (country)) Gudauri	(France) Julia Pereira de Sousa Mabileau	(France) Léa Casta	(Italy) Michela Moioli	(United Kingdom) Charlotte Bankes	
7	9 March 2025	(Georgia (country)) Gudauri	(United Kingdom) Charlotte Bankes	(France) Julia Pereira de Sousa Mabileau	(France) Léa Casta	(United Kingdom) Charlotte Bankes	
8	21 March 2025	(Austria) Montafon	(France) Léa Casta	(France) Julia Pereira de Sousa Mabileau	(United Kingdom) Charlotte Bankes	(United Kingdom) Charlotte Bankes	
9	5 April 2025	(Canada) Mt. St. Anne	(France) Léa Casta	(Australia) Mia Clift	(Switzerland) Sina Siegenthaler	(France) Léa Casta	
10	6 April 2025	(Canada) Mt. St. Anne	(France) Léa Casta	(Switzerland) Sina Siegenthaler	(Australia) Mia Clift	(France) Léa Casta	

==== Parallel (PSL/PGS) ====
#	Date	Place	Event	Winner	Second	Third	Discipline leader	R.
1	30 November 2024	(China) Mylin	PGS	(Czech Republic) Ester Ledecká	(Poland) Aleksandra Król-Walas	(Japan) Tsubaki Miki	(Czech Republic) Ester Ledecká	
2	1 December 2024	(China) Mylin	PSL	(Austria) Sabine Payer	(Japan) Tsubaki Miki	(Switzerland) Julie Zogg	(Czech Republic) Ester Ledecká	
3	7 December 2024	(China) Yanqing	PGS	(Italy) Lucia Dalmasso	(Austria) Sabine Payer	(Japan) Tsubaki Miki	(Austria) Sabine Payer	
4	8 December 2024	(China) Yanqing	PSL	(Japan) Tsubaki Miki	(Austria) Claudia Riegler	(Switzerland) Julie Zogg	(Japan) Tsubaki Miki	
5	12 December 2024	(Italy) Carezza	PGS	(Italy) Jasmin Coratti	(Poland) Aleksandra Król-Walas	(Japan) Tsubaki Miki	(Japan) Tsubaki Miki	
6	14 December 2024	(Italy) Cortina d'Ampezzo	PGS	(Austria) Sabine Payer	(Poland) Aleksandra Król-Walas	(Italy) Jasmin Coratti	(Japan) Tsubaki Miki	
7	21 December 2024	(Switzerland) Davos	PSL	(Japan) Tsubaki Miki	(Netherlands) Michelle Dekker	(Switzerland) Flurina Neva Bätschi	(Japan) Tsubaki Miki	
8	11 January 2025	(Switzerland) Scuol	PGS	(Poland) Aleksandra Król-Walas	(Japan) Tsubaki Miki	(Japan) Tomoka Takeuchi	(Japan) Tsubaki Miki	
9	14 January 2025	(Austria) Bad Gastein	PSL	(Germany) Ramona Theresia Hofmeister	(Japan) Tsubaki Miki	(Italy) Elisa Caffont	(Japan) Tsubaki Miki	
10	18 January 2025	(Bulgaria) Bansko	PGS	(Germany) Ramona Theresia Hofmeister	(Japan) Tsubaki Miki	(Poland) Aleksandra Król-Walas	(Japan) Tsubaki Miki	
11	19 January 2025	(Bulgaria) Bansko	PGS	(Germany) Ramona Theresia Hofmeister	(Japan) Tsubaki Miki	(Netherlands) Michelle Dekker	(Japan) Tsubaki Miki	
12	25 January 2025	(Slovenia) Rogla	PGS	(Japan) Tsubaki Miki	(Austria) Sabine Payer	(Italy) Elisa Caffont	(Japan) Tsubaki Miki	
13	15 February 2025	(Canada) Val. St. Come	PGS	(Germany) Ramona Theresia Hofmeister	(Austria) Sabine Payer	(Netherlands) Michelle Dekker	(Japan) Tsubaki Miki	
14	16 February 2025	(Canada) Val. St. Come	PGS	(Germany) Ramona Theresia Hofmeister	(Switzerland) Julie Zogg	(Japan) Tsubaki Miki	(Japan) Tsubaki Miki	
15	1 March 2025	(Poland) Krynica	PGS	(Germany) Ramona Theresia Hofmeister	(Netherlands) Michelle Dekker	(Switzerland) Julie Zogg	(Japan) Tsubaki Miki	
16	2 March 2025	(Poland) Krynica	PGS	(Japan) Tsubaki Miki	(Bulgaria) Malena Zamfirova	(Germany) Ramona Theresia Hofmeister	(Japan) Tsubaki Miki	
17	15 March 2025	(Germany) Winterberg	PSL	(Austria) Sabine Payer	(Germany) Ramona Theresia Hofmeister	(Czech Republic) Zuzana Maděrová	(Japan) Tsubaki Miki	

==== Halfpipe (HP) ====
#	Date	Place	Winner	Second	Third	Discipline leader	R.
1	8 December 2024	(China) Secret Garden	(United States) Maddie Mastro	(China) Cai Xuetong	(United States) Madeline Schaffrick	(United States) Maddie Mastro	
2	20 December 2024	(United States) Copper	(Japan) Sara Shimizu	(China) Cai Xuetong	(Japan) Mitsuki Ono	(China) Cai Xuetong	
3	18 January 2025	(Switzerland) Laax	(United States) Chloe Kim	(United States) Maddie Mastro	(South Korea) Choi Gaon	(United States) Maddie Mastro	
4	1 February 2025	(United States) Aspen	(United States) Chloe Kim	(South Korea) Choi Gaon	(Japan) Sara Shimizu	(United States) Maddie Mastro	
5	21 February 2025	(Canada) Calgary	(Japan) Sena Tomita	(United States) Maddie Mastro	(Canada) Elizabeth Hosking	(United States) Maddie Mastro	

==== Slopestyle (SS) ====
#	Date	Place	Winner	Second	Third	Discipline leader	R.
1	2 September 2024	(New Zealand) Cardrona	(Japan) Kokomo Murase	(United Kingdom) Mia Brookes	(United States) Rebecca Flynn	(Japan) Kokomo Murase	
2	18 January 2025	(Switzerland) Laax	(United Kingdom) Mia Brookes	(New Zealand) Zoi Sadowski-Synnott	(Japan) Kokomo Murase	(United Kingdom) Mia Brookes	
3	2 February 2025	(United States) Aspen	(New Zealand) Zoi Sadowski-Synnott	(Japan) Kokomo Murase	(United Kingdom) Mia Brookes	(Japan) Kokomo Murase	
4	22 February 2025	(Canada) Calgary	(Japan) Mari Fukada	(Germany) Annika Morgan	(United Kingdom) Mia Brookes	(United Kingdom) Mia Brookes	
5	14 March 2025	(Austria) Flachauwinkl	(New Zealand) Zoi Sadowski-Synnott	(Germany) Annika Morgan	(Japan) Mari Fukada	(New Zealand) Zoi Sadowski-Synnott	

==== Big Air (BA) ====
#	Date	Place	Winner	Second	Third	Discipline leader	R.
1	19 October 2024	(Switzerland) Chur	(Japan) Mari Fukada	(Japan) Reira Iwabuchi	(Canada) Laurie Blouin	(Japan) Mari Fukada	
2	1 December 2024	(China) Beijing	(United Kingdom) Mia Brookes	(Japan) Mari Fukada	(Austria) Anna Gasser	(Japan) Mari Fukada	
3	5 January 2025	(Austria) Klagenfurt	(United Kingdom) Mia Brookes	(Japan) Mari Fukada	(Japan) Momo Suzuki	(Japan) Mari Fukada	
4	11 January 2025	(Austria) Kreischberg	(Austria) Anna Gasser	(Japan) Reira Iwabuchi	(United Kingdom) Mia Brookes	(United Kingdom) Mia Brookes	
5	6 February 2025	(United States) Aspen	(New Zealand) Zoi Sadowski-Synnott	(Japan) Kokomo Murase	(Japan) Momo Suzuki	(United Kingdom) Mia Brookes	

=== Standings ===
==== Snowboard Cross ====
Rank	after all 10 events	Points
	(France) Léa Casta	805
2	(United Kingdom) Charlotte Bankes	622
3	(France) Julia Pereira de Sousa Mabileau	474
4	(Australia) Josie Baff	458
5	(Switzerland) Sina Siegenthaler	374

==== Parallel Overall (PSL/PGS) ====
Rank	after all 17 events	Points
	(Japan) Tsubaki Miki	1209
2	(Germany) Ramona Theresia Hofmeister	1034
3	(Austria) Sabine Payer	914
4	(Switzerland) Julie Zogg	693
5	(Netherlands) Michelle Dekker	681

==== Parallel slalom ====
Rank	after all 5 events	Points
	(Japan) Tsubaki Miki	405
2	(Austria) Sabine Payer	326
3	(Germany) Ramona Theresia Hofmeister	281
4	(Austria) Claudia Riegler	229
5	(Netherlands) Michelle Dekker	229

==== Parallel giant slalom ====
Rank	after all 12 events	Points
	(Japan) Tsubaki Miki	804
2	(Germany) Ramona Theresia Hofmeister	773
3	(Austria) Sabine Payer	588
4	(Poland) Aleksandra Król-Walas	561
5	(Switzerland) Julie Zogg	486

==== Freestyle overall (BA/SS/HP) ====
Rank	after all 15 events	Points
1	(United Kingdom) Mia Brookes	500
2	(Japan) Mari Fukada	465
3	(New Zealand) Zoi Sadowski-Synnott	436
4	(Japan) Kokomo Murase	420
5	(United States) Maddie Mastro	350

==== Halfpipe ====
Rank	after all 5 events	Points
	(United States) Maddie Mastro	310
2	(United States) Chloe Kim	250
3	(Japan) Sara Shimizu	241
4	(China) Cai Xuetong	232
5	(Japan) Sena Tomita	198

==== Slopestyle ====
Rank	after all 5 events	Points
	(New Zealand) Zoi Sadowski-Synnott	312
2	(United Kingdom) Mia Brookes	300
3	(Japan) Kokomo Murase	290
4	(Japan) Mari Fukada	241
5	(Germany) Annika Morgan	234

==== Big Air ====
Rank	after all 5 events	Points
	(United Kingdom) Mia Brookes	305
2	(Japan) Mari Fukada	305
3	(Japan) Reira Iwabuchi	255
4	(Austria) Anna Gasser	208
5	(Japan) Kokomo Murase	194

== Team ==
=== Parallel team (PRT) ===
#	Date	Place	Event	Winner	Second	Third	Discipline leader	R.
1	15 January 2025	(Austria) Bad Gastein	PSL	Austria 1 Andreas Prommegger; Sabine Payer	Germany 1 Stefan Baumeister; Ramona Theresia Hofmeister	Switzerland 1 Gian Casanova; Flurina Neva Bätschi	Austria 1 Andreas Prommegger; Sabine Payer	
2	16 March 2025	(Germany) Winterberg	PSL	Germany 1 Elias Huber; Ramona Theresia Hofmeister	Germany 2 Stefan Baumeister; Cheyenne Loch	Italy 1 Maurizio Bormolini; Elisa Caffont	Austria 1 Andreas Prommegger; Sabine Payer	

=== Snowboard Cross team (BXT) ===
#	Date	Place	Winner	Second	Third	Discipline leader	R.
	25 January 2025	(Czech Republic) Dolní Morava	Cancelled				
1	2 March 2025	(Turkey) Erzurum	Australia 1 Cameron Bolton; Josie Baff	Great Britain 1 Huw Nightingale; Charlotte Bankes	Austria 1 Lukas Pachner; Pia Zerkhold	Australia 1 Cameron Bolton; Josie Baff	
2	22 March 2025	(Austria) Montafon	France 2 Aidan Chollet; Julia Pereira de Sousa Mabileau	Australia 1 Adam Lambert; Josie Baff	France 1 Loan Bozzolo; Léa Casta	Great Britain 1 Huw Nightingale; Charlotte Bankes	

== Nations Cup ==
=== Overall ===
Rank	after 35 of 88 events	Points
1	Japan	2805
2	Austria	2598
3	Italy	2524
4	Switzerland	1478
5	Germany	1337
6	China	1172
7	United States	1079
8	Canada	979
9	South Korea	806
10	Poland	672

=== Snowboard Cross (SBX/BXT) ===
Rank	after 2 of 22 events	Points
1	France	435
2	Australia	205
3	Austria	165
4	Italy	162
5	Switzerland	160
6	Canada	95
7	Germany	80
8	United States	63
9	Spain	62
10	Great Britain	50

=== Snowboard Alpine (PSL/PGS/PRT) ===
Rank	after 19 of 36 events	Points
1	Italy	2955
2	Austria	2711
3	Switzerland	1340
4	Germany	1076
5	Japan	876
6	Poland	677
7	Slovenia	677
8	South Korea	643
9	China	432
10	Czech Republic	429

=== Park & Pipe (HP/SS/BA) ===
Rank	after 14 of 30 events	Points
1	Japan	2834
2	United States	1134
3	China	1011
4	Austria	542
5	Great Britain	531
6	Canada	500
7	New Zealand	458
8	Italy	372
9	Germany	356
10	Norway	336

== Podium table by nation ==
Table showing the World Cup podium places (gold–1st place, silver–2nd place, bronze–3rd place) by the countries represented by the athletes.

Rank	Nation	Gold	Silver	Bronze	Total
1	Japan	16	17	17	50
2	Austria	11	12	7	30
3	Italy	10	9	13	32
4	Germany	9	8	2	19
5	Great Britain	8	2	3	13
6	Canada	6	1	3	10
7	France	4	4	8	16
8	United States	4	4	7	15
9	New Zealand	3	2	1	6
10	Australia	2	5	1	8
11	Slovenia	2	1	0	3
12	China	1	3	1	5
12	Poland	1	3	1	5
14	Switzerland	1	2	6	9
15	Bulgaria	1	1	2	4
16	Czech Republic	1	0	1	2
17	South Korea	0	3	3	6
18	Netherlands	0	2	2	4
19	Norway	0	1	2	3
Totals (19 entries)		80	80	80	240

== Achievements ==
First World Cup career victory

Men

- (Canada) Cameron Spalding (19) – Slopestyle in Cardrona
- (China) Yang Wenlong (25) – Big Air in Kreischberg

Women

- (France) Léa Casta (18) – Snowboard Cross in Cervinia
- (United Kingdom) Mia Brookes (17) – Big Air in Beijing
- (United States) Maddie Mastro (24) – Halfpipe in Secret Garden
- (Italy) Jasmin Coratti (23) – Parallel giant slalom in Carezza
- (Japan) Sara Shimizu (15) – Halfpipe in Copper

First World Cup career podium

Men

- (New Zealand) Rocco Jamieson (18) – Slopestyle in Cardrona
- (South Korea) Kim Sang-kyum (35) – Parallel giant slalom in Mylin
- (Italy) Gabriel Messner (27) – Parallel slalom in Mylin
- (China) Yang Wenlong (25) – Big Air in Beijing
- (Japan) Ryusei Yamada (18) – Halfpipe in Secret Garden
- (Norway) Øyvind Kirkhus (22) – Big Air in Klagenfurt
- (Austria) Dominik Burgstaller (23) – Parallel giant slalom in Scuol
- (United States) Cody Winters (USA) – Parallel slalom in Bad Gastein

Women

- (United States) Rebecca Flynn (18) – Slopestyle in Cardrona
- (United States) Madeline Schaffrick (30) – Halfpipe in Secret Garden
- (France) Maja-Li Iafrate Danielsson (18) – Snowboard Cross in Cervinia
- (Switzerland) Flurina Neva Bätschi (21) – Parallel slalom in Davos
- (Japan) Momo Suzuki (17) – Big Air in Klagenfurt
- (Bulgaria) Malena Zamfirova (15) – Parallel Giant Slalom in Krynica
