= Gabriel Messner =

Italian snowboarder (born 1997)

Personal information
- Born: 7 June 1997 (age 29)

Sport
- Country: Italy
- Sport: Snowboarding
- Event: Parallel slalom
Medal record
Men's snowboarding
Representing Italy
World Championships
Silver medal – second place	2025 Engadin	Mixed parallel slalom

Gabriel Messner (born 7 June 1997) is an Italian snowboarder specializing in parallel slalom.

== Career ==
During the 2024–25 FIS Snowboard World Cup, Messner earned his first World Cup podium on 1 December 2024. He finished the World Cup season in second place in the parallel slalom standings with 252 points, behind Arvid Auner.

Messner represented Italy at the 2025 Snowboarding World Championships and won a silver medal in the mixed parallel slalom event, along with Jasmin Coratti.
