= Hahna Norman =

American snowboarder (born 2004)

Personal information
- Born: October 26, 2004 (age 21) Arizona, U.S.

Sport
- Country: United States
- Sport: Snowboarding
- Event(s): Slopestyle, Big air
- Club: Ski & Snowboard Club Vail

Hahna Norman (born October 26, 2004) is an American professional snowboarder, specializing in slopestyle and big air. She represented the United States in slopestyle and big air at the 2026 Winter Olympics, her first Olympic Games.

== Early life ==
Born in Arizona, Norman grew up in Truckee, California near Lake Tahoe. She pursued ski racing before switching to snowboarding at age 8. She lived in Rome, Italy from ages ten to thirteen before returning to Truckee and joining the Northstar Snowboard Team. During high school, she moved to Colorado to attend Vail Ski & Snowboard Academy and train full time.

== Career ==
Norman made her World Cup debut in Switzerland during the 2021-22 FIS Snowboard World Cup. At an event in Calgary, Norman tore her ACL, requiring surgery and six months of recovery. The injury also cost her a chance to qualify for the 2022 Winter Olympics. After returning to competition, Norman won the slopestyle title at the 2023 U.S National Championships at Copper Mountain. After multiple top-10 finishes during the 2024-25 FIS Snowboard World Cup, she was selected to the U.S team for the 2025 FIS Snowboard World Championships, where she finished 10th in big air and 18th in slopestyle.

Norman was selected to represent the U.S. for the 2026 Winter Olympics. She was the oldest member of the slopestyle team at just 21 years old.
