= Jasmin Coratti =

Italian snowboarder (born 2001)

Personal information
- Born: 5 August 2001 (age 24) Schlanders, Italy

Sport
- Country: Italy
- Sport: Snowboarding
- Event(s): Parallel slalom, parallel giant slalom
Medal record
Women's snowboarding
Representing Italy
World Championships
Silver medal – second place	2025 Engadin	Mixed parallel slalom

Jasmin Coratti (born 5 August 2001) is an Italian snowboarder specializing in parallel slalom and parallel giant slalom disciplines.

== Career ==
During the 2024–25 FIS Snowboard World Cup, Coratti earned her first career World Cup podium on 12 December 2024.

Coratti represented Italy at the 2025 Snowboarding World Championships and won a silver medal in the mixed parallel slalom event, along with Gabriel Messner.

== Personal life ==
Coratti's brother, Edwin, is also a snowboarder.
