= Elisa Caffont =

Italian snowboarder (born 1999)

Personal information
- Born: 17 February 1999 (age 27) Belluno, Italy

Sport
- Country: Italy
- Sport: Snowboarding
- Events: Parallel slalom, parallel giant slalom
Medal record
Women's snowboarding
Representing Italy
World Championships
Gold medal – first place	2025 Engadin	Mixed parallel slalom

Elisa Caffont (born 17 February 1999) is an Italian snowboarder specializing in parallel slalom.

== Career ==
Caffont represented Italy at the 2025 Snowboarding World Championships and won a gold medal in the mixed parallel slalom event, along with Maurizio Bormolini.
