= Malena Zamfirova =

Bulgarian snowboarder (born 2009)

Personal information
- Born: 3 June 2009 (age 16) Sofia, Bulgaria

Sport
- Country: Bulgaria
- Sport: Snowboarding
- Event(s): Parallel slalom, parallel giant slalom

Malena Zamfirova (born 3 June 2009) is a Bulgarian snowboarder specializing in parallel slalom and parallel giant slalom disciplines.

== Career ==
She made her first final in the 2024–25 FIS Snowboard World Cup and came second. Zamfirova claimed her second World Cup podium in the 2025–26 FIS Snowboard World Cup.

She represented Bulgaria at the 2026 Winter Olympics, finishing 9th in PGS.

== World Cup ==
=== Podiums ===
| Season | Date | Location | Event | Place |
|---|---|---|---|---|
| 2024–25 | 2 Mar 2025 | Krynica, Poland | PGS | 2nd |
| 2025–26 | 6 Dec 2025 | Mylin, China | PGS | 3rd |
| 2025–26 | 1 Mar 2026 | Krynica, Poland | PGS | 3rd |

== Olympics performance ==
| Event | Parallel giant slalom |
|---|---|
| (Italy) 2026 Milano Cortina | 9th |

== Personal life ==
Her older brother Tervel Zamfirov is also a professional snowboarder.
