= Cool Wakushima =

New Zealand snowboarder (born 2002)

Personal information
- Born: 10 May 2002 (age 23) Tokyo, Japan
- Height: 1.65 m (5 ft 5 in)

Sport
- Country: New Zealand
- Sport: Snowboarding
- Event(s): Slopestyle; Big air

Cool Wakushima (born 10 May 2002) is a New Zealand snowboarder, specialising in slopestyle and big air competitions. She represented New Zealand in the slopestyle and big air events at the 2022 Winter Olympics in Beijing, China.

== Biography ==
Born in Tokyo, Japan, Wakushima moved to New Zealand with her family when she was nine years old, settling in Queenstown, where she was educated at Wakatipu High School. She is coached by Mitch Brown, the high-performance snowboard coach for Snow Sports NZ. In 2021, Wakushima began studying psychology at Massey University.

Wakushima was first named to represent New Zealand in 2020, and began competing on the FIS Snowboard World Cup circuit in 2021. In her first season, her best results in slopestyle and big air were seventh and seventeenth, respectively, and she ended the season ranked 19th in slopestyle and 17th in big air. In the 2021–2022 season, she has two top-ten finishes in slopestyle, including a fifth placing at Laax, and a best finish of 18th in big air.

At the 2021 FIS Snowboard World Championships in Aspen, Wakushima placed eighth in slopestyle and 13th in big air.
