= Katie Ormerod =

British snowboarder (born 1997)

Personal information
- Nationality: British
- Born: 25 August 1997 (age 28) Bradford, England

Sport
- Country: Great Britain
- Sport: Snowboarding
Medal record
Women's snowboarding
Representing Great Britain
Winter X Games
Bronze medal – third place	2017 Aspen	Women's Slopestyle

Katie Ormerod (born 25 August 1997) is a British snowboarder who was selected to participate in the 2018 Winter Olympics and 2022 Winter Olympics. She is from Brighouse, West Yorkshire.

== Career ==
Ormerod narrowly missed qualifying for the 2014 Winter Olympics when she was 16. In November 2016, she was placed third at the Big Air World Cup in Pyeongchang, a test event for the venue of the 2018 Winter Olympics. In January 2017, she won the Big Air World Cup event in Moscow and a bronze medal in the Women's Slopestyle at the Winter X Games XXI in Aspen.

In May 2014, then aged 16, Ormerod became the first female snowboarder to land a double cork 1080, one of the most complex manoeuvres in snowboarding, which involves three rotations and two inverted flips.

In the 2018 Winter Olympics, she was due to compete in the slopestyle and big air snowboarding events. She was described as "arguably Britain's best medal chance for Pyeongchang 2018", but was forced to withdraw from the Games after breaking her heel in two places in training. She had previously broken her wrist but was determined to compete.

In March 2020, the then 22-year-old won the overall Snowboard Slopestyle World Cup, becoming the first British woman to win a Crystal Globe.

In the 2022 Winter Olympics, she was selected to compete in the women's slopestyle and big air snowboarding events.

In the 2026 Winter Olympics, she was part of the TNT Sports commentary team for the snowboarding events.

== Personal life ==
Katie Ormerod started snowboarding aged 5 when she went to Halifax Ski & Snowboard Centre with her family, who were all keen snowboarders. Speaking of her early years snowboarding, Ormerod noted "I kept snowboarding there every week, and then started going to the local snowdome. The whole time, I was balancing snowboarding with gymnastics as well, which really helped." In 2020 she began to study for a BSc in Sport Coaching and Development at Manchester Metropolitan University under the university's elite sports scholarship scheme.

Her cousin is Jamie Nicholls who represented Great Britain at the 2014 Winter Olympics.
