= Courtney Rummel =

American professional snowboarder

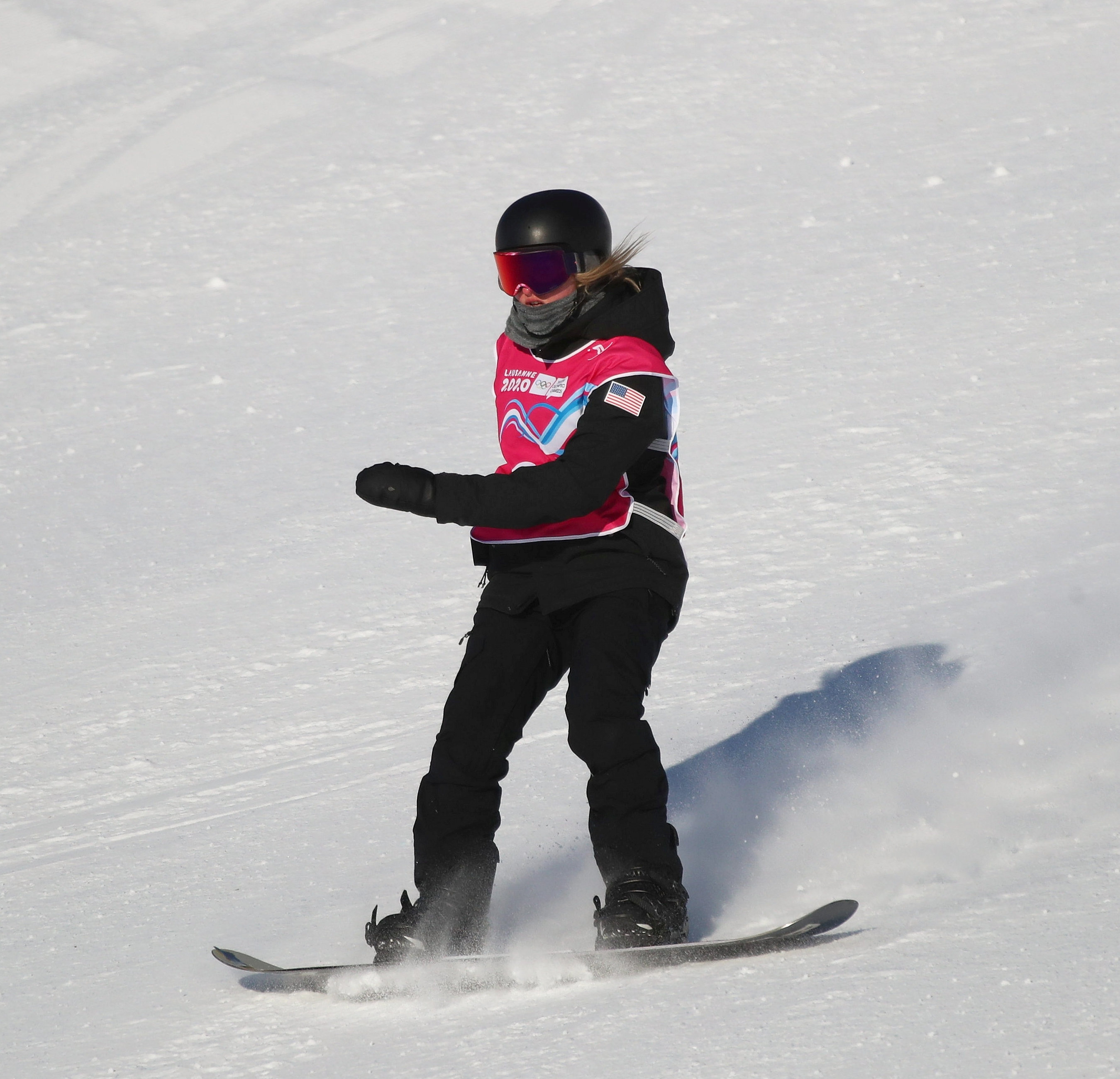
- Courtney Rummel at the 2020 Winter Youth Olympics

Personal information
- Born: November 12, 2003 (age 22) West Bend, Wisconsin, United States
- Home town: West Bend, Wisconsin, United States

Sport
- Country: United States
- Sport: Snowboarding
- Events: Big air, slopestyle
- Club: Wisconsin Advanced Ski and Snowboard Program

Courtney Rummel (born November 12, 2003) is an American professional snowboarder, specializing in big air and slopestyle. Rummel was named to the US Team for the 2022 Winter Olympics, finishing 19th in the big air event and 17th in the slopestyle event. She also competed in the 2020 Winter Youth Olympics.

== Early life ==
Rummel was born to her mother, Kimberly Rummel, and father, John Rummel, on November 12, 2003.

Rummel was inspired to start snowboarding after seeing her brother, Cole, win competitions. She would first make an appearance at Sunburst Ski Hill in Kewaskum, Wisconsin.

== Career ==
=== 2022 Winter Olympics ===
On January 23, she was announced to have been selected to be one of the 26 snowboarders for Team USA for the 2022 Winter Olympics. She would finish 19th in the big air event, failing to qualify, and 17th in the slopestyle event, also failing to qualify.

== Personal life ==
Rummel went to West Bend West High School. She has three sisters, Kelsey, Chloe, and Kendall, and one brother, Cole.
