= Momo Suzuki =

Japanese snowboarder (born 2007)

Personal information
- Born: 29 October 2007 (age 18) Niigata, Japan

Sport
- Country: Japan
- Sport: Snowboarding
- Event(s): Slopestyle, Big air
Medal record
Women's Snowboarding
Representing Japan
Junior World Championships
Silver medal – second place	2024 Livigno	Big Air

Momo Suzuki (born 29 October 2007) is a Japanese snowboarder who competes in the slopestyle and big air events. She won a silver medal in the Women's big air event at the 2024 Junior World Championships.

== Major results ==
=== World cup podiums ===
Season	Date	Location	Discipline	Place
2024–25	5 January 2025	Klagenfurt, Austria	Big Air	3rd
2024–25	6 February 2025	Aspen, United States	Big Air	3rd
