= Mari Fukada =

Japanese snowboarder (born 2007)

Personal information
- Born: 1 January 2007 (age 19) Aichi Prefecture, Japan

Sport
- Country: Japan
- Sport: Snowboarding
- Events: Slopestyle, Big air
Medal record
Women's snowboarding
Representing Japan
Winter Olympics
Gold medal – first place	2026 Milano Cortina	Slopestyle
World Championships
Bronze medal – third place	2025 Engadin	Big air

Mari Fukada (深田茉莉, Fukada Mari; born 1 January 2007) is a Japanese snowboarder who competes in the slopestyle and big air events. She won the gold medal in the slopestyle event at the 2026 Winter Olympics.

== Major results ==
=== World Cup ===
Season	Freestyle overall		Slopestyle		Big Air	
Season	Points	Position	Points	Position	Points	Position
2022–23	199	11th	85	11th	114	7th
2023–24	235	10th	20	28th	215	2nd

=== World cup podiums ===
Season	Date	Location	Discipline	Place
2022–23	17 December 2022	Copper Mountain, United States	Big Air	1st
2023–24	15 December 2023	Copper Mountain, United States	Big Air	2nd
2024–25	19 October 2024	Chur, Switzerland	Big Air	1st
2024–25	1 December 2024	Beijing, China	Big Air	2nd
2024–25	5 January 2025	Klagenfurt, Austria	Big Air	2nd
2024–25	22 February 2025	Calgary, Canada	Slopestyle	1st
2025–26	29 November 2025	Zhangjiakou, China	Big Air	1st
