= Meila Stalker =

Australian snowboarder (born 2004)

Personal information
- Born: 4 February 2004 (age 22) Nambour, Australia

Sport
- Sport: Snowboarding
- Event(s): Big air, Slopestyle

Meila Stalker (born 4 February 2004) is an Australian snowboarder.

== Career ==
In January 2026, Stalker was selected to represent Australia at the 2026 Winter Olympics. During the big air qualification she ranked sixth and advanced to the finals.
