= Evy Poppe =

Belgian snowboarder (born 2004)

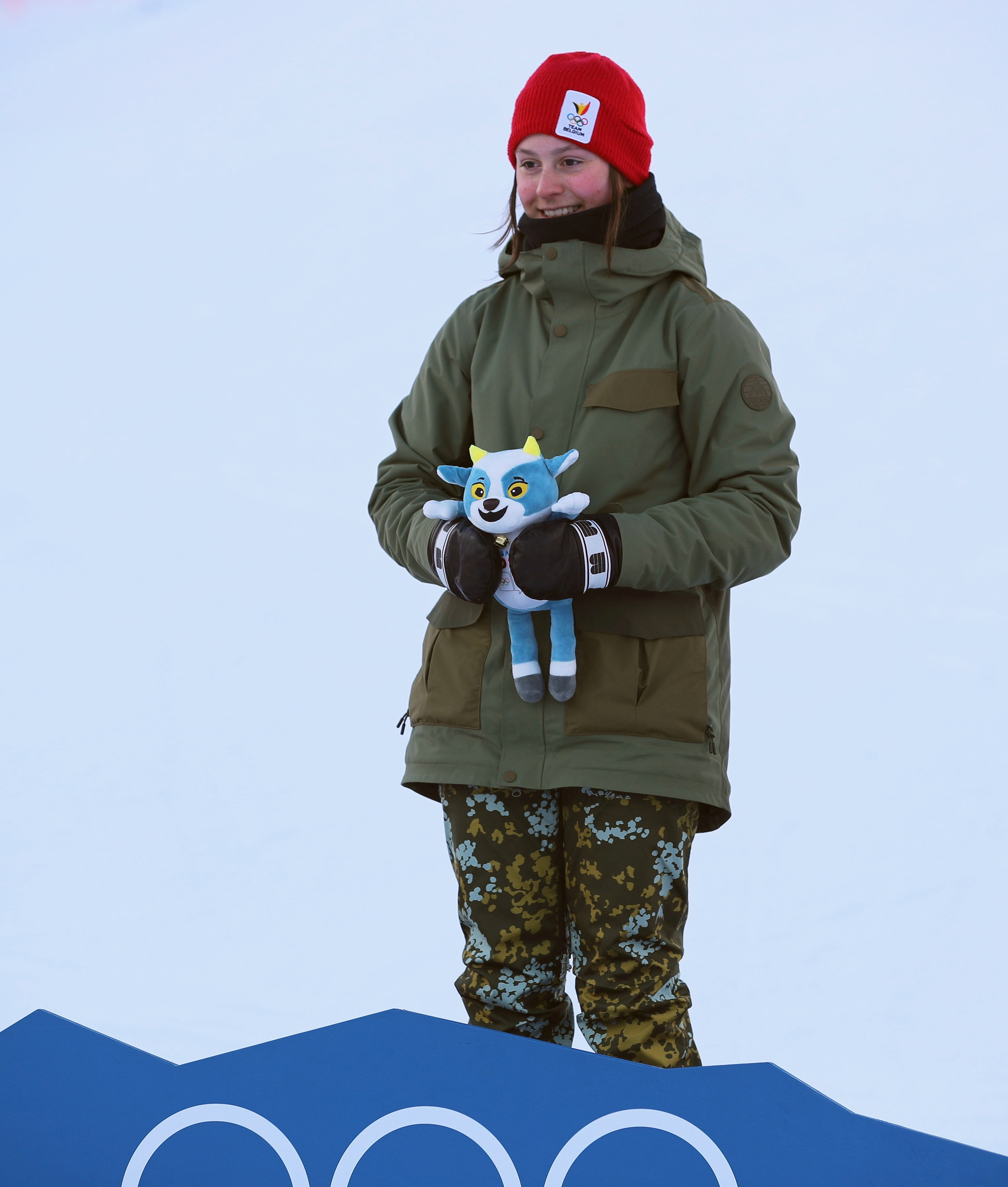
- Evy Poppe at the 2020 Winter Youth Olympics

Personal information
- Nationality: Belgian
- Born: 2 March 2004 (age 22) Ghent, Belgium
- Home town: Zelzate, Belgium

Sport
- Country: Belgium
- Sport: Snowboarding
- Events: Slopestyle, Big Air
Medal record
Snowboarding
Representing Belgium
Youth Olympic Games
Gold medal – first place	2020 Lausanne	Slopestyle
Junior World Championships
Gold medal – first place	2021 Krasnoyarsk	Slopestyle
Bronze medal – third place	2021 Krasnoyarsk	Big Air

Evy Poppe (born 2 March 2004) is a now retired Belgian snowboarder. Poppe won Belgium's first ever gold medal at a Winter Youth Olympics.

== Biography ==
She won the gold medal at the 2020 Winter Youth Olympics in slopestyle. The slopestyle finals were held on 20 January 2020. Poppe earned 94.00 points in her last run. She beat Melissa Peperkamp from the Netherlands by 2.25 points. In 2021 she won the gold medal at the FIS Snowboarding Junior World Championships in slopestyle. She announced her retirement from the sport, aged 22, in September 2026.
