= Melissa Peperkamp =

Dutch snowboarder (born 2004)

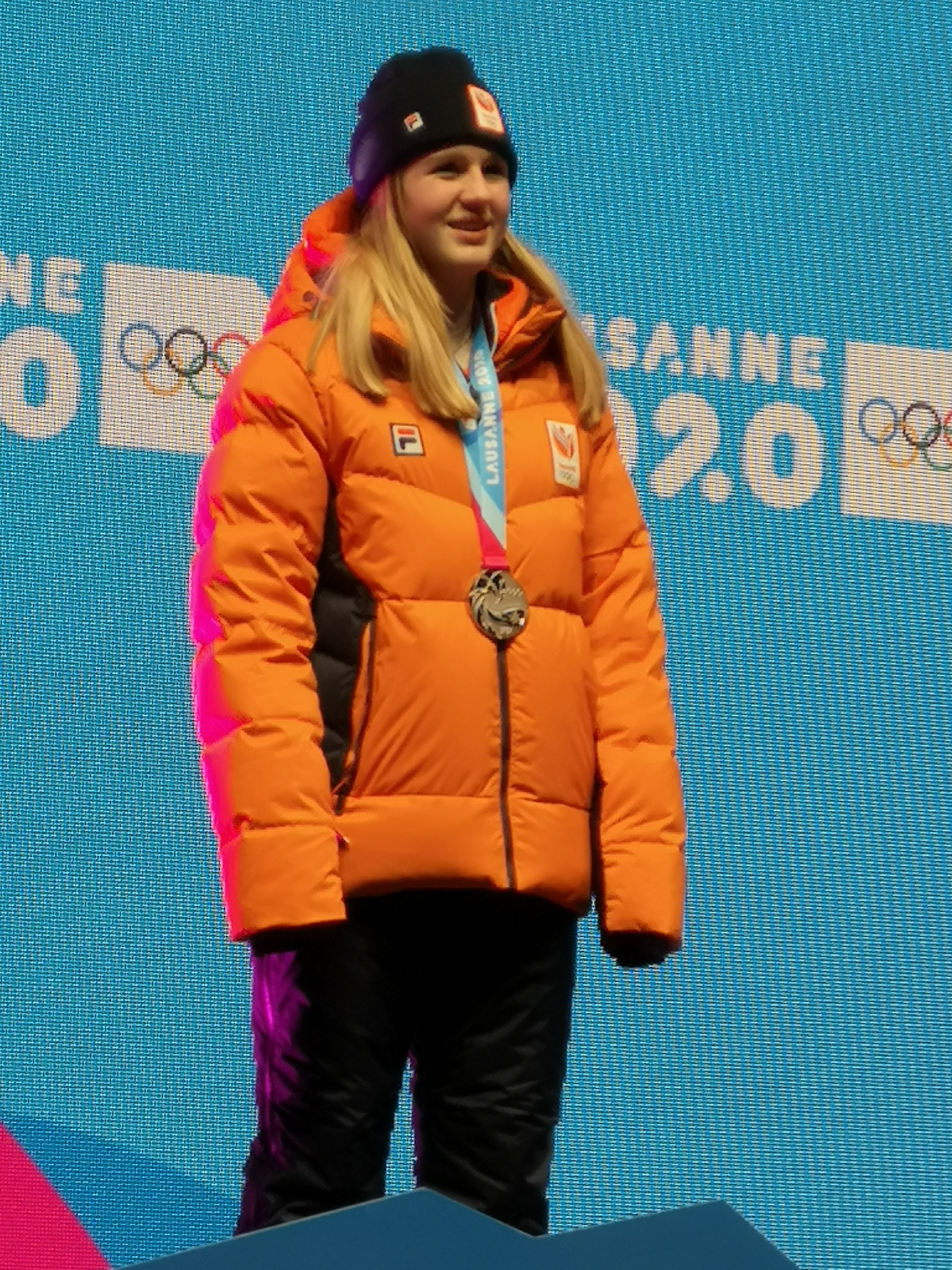
- Peperkamp in 2020

Personal information
- Nickname: Katjap
- Born: 22 April 2004 (age 22) Utrecht, Utrecht, Netherlands

Sport
- Country: Netherlands
- Sport: Snowboarding
- Events: Slopestyle, Big air
Medal record
Snowboarding
Representing Netherlands
Youth Olympic Games
Silver medal – second place	2020 Lausanne	Slopestyle
Bronze medal – third place	2020 Lausanne	Big air

Melissa Peperkamp (born 22 April 2004) is a Dutch snowboarder. She is a multi-time Dutch champion. At the 2020 Winter Youth Olympics, she won a silver medal in the slopestyle event and a bronze in the Big air event. She qualified for both these events for the 2022 Winter Olympics. In the big air competition she qualified for the final and finished 6th while she narrowly missed the qualification for the final in the slopestyle competition.

== Achievement ==
Melissa Peperkamp began competing at the age of 13. She got her first on a snowboard when she was six, before spending several years working on the basics at her local ski slope. She has been on an upward trajectory in the sport; She started at Skipiste Nieuwegein for the basics. After this, it went quickly: from Club SnowWorld to Xtreme Team and Dutch SBX Team. At the invitation of trainer Niels, she joined the Rookie Team of the Dutch Ski Association. She has been an official selection member of TeamNL since 2019. She finished sixth in slopestyle in 2020 (Mammoth Mountain), Her first World Cup top-10 finish was in her second appearance, and her top finish to date is fifth in slopestyle in 2021 (Silvaplana). She competed at the 2021 World Championships and 2019 Junior World Championships.
