= Anna Gasser =

Austrian snowboarder (born 1991)

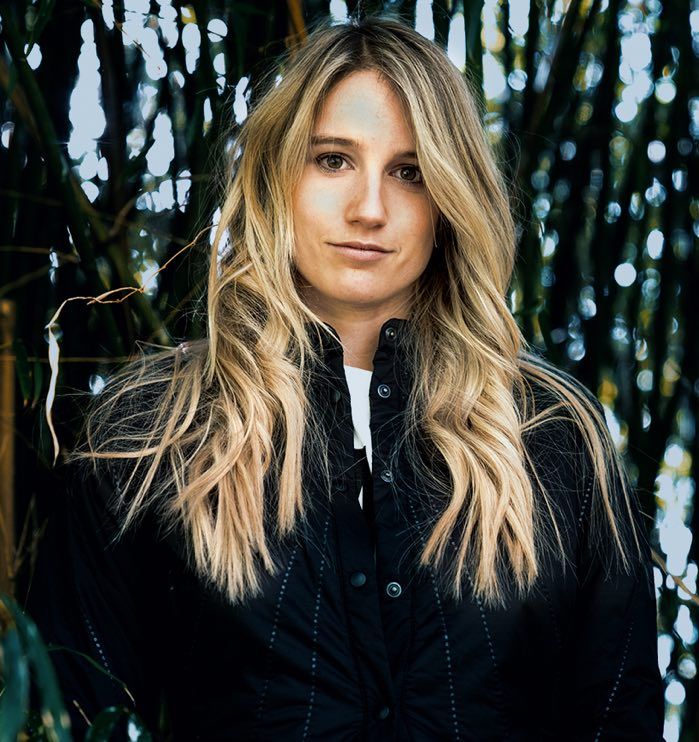
- Gasser in 2017

Personal information
- Born: 16 August 1991 (age 35) Villach, Austria
- Height: 5 ft 6 in (168 cm)

Sport
- Country: Austria
- Sport: Snowboarding
- Events: Slopestyle, Big air
Medal record
Women's snowboarding
Representing Austria
Olympic Games
Gold medal – first place	2018 Pyeongchang	Big air
Gold medal – first place	2022 Beijing	Big air
World Championships
Gold medal – first place	2017 Sierra Nevada	Big air
Gold medal – first place	2023 Bakuriani	Big air
Silver medal – second place	2015 Kreischberg	Slopestyle
Winter X Games
Gold medal – first place	2017 Hafjell	Slopestyle
Gold medal – first place	2018 Aspen	Big air
Silver medal – second place	2017 Aspen	Big air
Bronze medal – third place	2017 Hafjell	Big air

Anna Gasser (born 16 August 1991) is an Austrian snowboarder, competing in slopestyle and big air. She lives in Millstatt. She is the 2018 and 2022 Olympic Champion in Big air.

Gasser qualified for the 2014 Winter Olympics and showed the best result in the qualification round, directly qualifying for the final. In 2017 Gasser won Gold in the Big air event at the Snowboard World Championships in Spain. Gasser also had a successful 2017 X Games performance winning gold in Slopestyle and bronze in Big air in Hafjell, and silver for Big air in Aspen.

== Career ==
Gasser first began snowboarding at age 18. After graduating from high school, she moved to the United States to train at Mammoth Mountain, despite not knowing English well. Gasser worked as a babysitter to save enough money to afford the move to the United States to train all winter. She started to compete in snowboarding in the 2010/2011 season, at age 20. Before competing in slopestyle, Gasser was part of the Austrian National Gymnastics Team, but quit at age 15 because she did not like the demanding training schedule. She said she preferred snowboarding because "no one tells you what to do", and that her previous gymnastics training allowed her to transition easily into doing snowboard tricks in the air. At FIS Snowboarding World Championships 2013 Gasser finished 18th. Her best World Cup result and the only podium finish before the 2014 Olympics was the third-place finish in Stoneham on 19 January 2014.

In November 2013, Gasser became the first female snowboarder to perform a Cab Double Cork 900 kicker, a double salto backwards with a half-turn.

Gasser won 3 X Games medals in the 2017 season. She also won gold in slopestyle at the Burton US Open and Gold at the snowboarding World Championships receiving a score of 100.

In 2018 Gasser became the first woman to land a cab triple underflip.

At the 2023 World Championships in Bakuriani, Georgia, Gasser won the gold in the big air event.

=== 2014 Winter Olympics ===
Gasser qualified first for the slopestyle final event. However, she fell in both runs for the final event and was classified tenth. Aimee Fuller who was a British competitor who had been eliminated earlier, joined the BBC Sport team for the final of her event, which included Gasser. Fuller and the other members of the commentary team, Ed Leigh and Tim Warwood were criticised for their reaction when Gasser fell during her final run. The incident drew more than 300 complaints.

=== 2018 Winter Olympics ===
Anna Gasser won gold in the inaugural Big air event with a total score of 185 points. She also competed in the women's slopestyle final, where she finished 15th.

=== 2022 Winter Olympics ===
She successfully defended her Olympic Big air title by landing a Cab Double Cork 1260 in her final run.

Awards
Preceded by Eva-Maria Brem	Austrian Sportswoman of the year 2017, 2018	Succeeded by Vanessa Herzog
