= Annika Morgan =

German snowboarder (born 2002)

Personal information
- Full name: Annika Sophie Morgan
- Born: 12 February 2002 (age 24) Garmisch-Partenkirchen, Germany

Sport
- Country: Germany
- Sport: Snowboarding
- Events: Slopestyle, Big air
Medal record
Women's Snowboarding
Representing Germany
Winter Youth Olympics
Silver medal – second place	2020 Lausanne	Big air

Annika Sophie Morgan (born 12 February 2002) is a German snowboarder who competes in the slopestyle and big air events. She competed in the women's slopestyle event at the 2022 Winter Olympics.
