= FIS Snowboarding World Championships 2013 – Men's parallel giant slalom =

The men's parallel giant slalom competition of the FIS Snowboarding World Championships 2013 was held in Stoneham-et-Tewkesbury, Quebec on January 25, 2013. 55 athletes from 22 countries competed.

== Medalists ==
Gold	Benjamin Karl; Austria (AUT)
Silver	Roland Fischnaller; Italy (ITA)
Bronze	Vic Wild; Russia (RUS)

== Results ==
=== Qualification ===
Each participant takes one run on either of the courses. After the first run, only the top 16 are allowed a second run on the opposite course.

Rank	Bib	Name	Country	Blue Course	Red Course	Overall Time	Notes
1	8	Andreas Prommegger	Austria	39.07	40.18	1:19.25	Q
2	5	Žan Košir	Slovenia	40.45	38.81	1:19.26	Q
3	6	Aaron March	Italy	38.89	40.39	1:19.28	Q
4	2	Simon Schoch	Switzerland	38.90	40.57	1:19.47	Q
5	3	Vic Wild	Russia	39.56	40.21	1:19.77	Q
6	4	Roland Fischnaller	Italy	39.31	40.55	1:19.86	Q
7	1	Kaspar Flütsch	Switzerland	40.28	39.67	1:19.95	Q
8	15	Benjamin Karl	Austria	40.56	39.51	1:20.07	Q
9	20	Philipp Schoch	Switzerland	40.18	39.94	1:20.12	Q
10	14	Justin Reiter	United States	40.15	40.07	1:20.22	Q
11	19	Rok Marguč	Slovenia	40.07	40.43	1:20.50	Q
12	24	Sylvain Dufour	France	40.30	40.21	1:20.51	Q
13	16	Nevin Galmarini	Switzerland	39.64	40.96	1:20.60	Q
14	13	Rok Flander	Slovenia	40.28	40.36	1:20.64	Q
15	25	Anton Unterkofler	Austria	40.83	39.87	1:20.70	Q
16	12	Lukas Mathies	Austria	39.48	41.40	1:20.88	Q
17	11	Andrey Sobolev	Russia	40.39	40.51	1:20.90	
18	27	Stanislav Detkov	Russia	40.98	40.08	1:21.06	
19	26	Matthew Morison	Canada	40.84	40.44	1:21.28	
20	17	Jasey-Jay Anderson	Canada	41.50	39.98	1:21.48	
21	23	Alexander Bergmann	Germany	41.56	40.17	1:21.73	
22	43	Adam McLeish	United Kingdom	40.89	41.11	1:22.00	
23	34	Kim Sang-Kyum	South Korea	40.31	41.80	1:22.11	
24	18	Aleksandr Belkin	Russia	40.93	41.80	1:22.73	
25	33	Edwin Coratti	Italy	42.89	40.01	1:22.90	
26	28	Masaki Shiba	Japan	40.35	42.87	1:23.22	
27	39	Aaron Muss	United States	41.38	41.88	1:23.26	
28	9	Jernej Demšar	Slovenia	41.36	42.09	1:23.45	
29	41	Petr Šindelář	Czech Republic	41.67	42.09	1:23.76	
30	22	Meinhard Erlacher	Italy	39.40	DNF		
31	10	Manuel Veith	Austria	39.84	DNF		
32	30	Michael Lambert	Canada	40.15	DNF		
33	29	Michael Trapp	United States	DSQ	40.17		
34	32	Yosyf Penyak	Ukraine	42.04			
35	21	Stefan Baumeister	Germany		42.23		
36	45	Lee Sang-Ho	South Korea		42.27		
37	31	Steve Barlow	Canada		42.33		
38	38	Oleksandr Belinskyy	Ukraine	43.04			
39	35	Shin Bong-Shik	South Korea		43.40		
40	47	Marcell Pátkai	Hungary		43.63		
41	40	Radoslav Yankov	Bulgaria	43.93			
42	48	Bi Ye	China	44.07			
43	53	Ding Jie	China		44.08		
44	7	Patrick Bussler	Germany		44.24		
45	52	Zhang Xuan	China	44.30			
46	44	Richard Wilkes	Australia	44.71			
47	50	Viktor Brůžek	Czech Republic	44.89			
48	37	Converse Fields	United States		46.56		
49	51	Wu Pengtao	China		50.40		
50	46	Revaz Nazgaidze	Georgia	51.09			
51	36	Choi Bo-Gun	South Korea	51.83			
52	55	Anastassios Zarkadas	Greece		54.13		
53	54	Mert Işık	Turkey	1:00.45			
	49	Ryan Espiritu	Philippines		DSQ		
	42	Albert Jelínek	Czech Republic	DSQ			

=== Elimination round ===
Round of 16
1	Andreas Prommegger (AUT)	W
16	Lukas Mathies (AUT)	+0.09
8	Benjamin Karl (AUT)	W
9	Philipp Schoch (SUI)	DSQ
5	Vic Wild (RUS)	W
12	Sylvain Dufour (FRA)	+13.67
4	Simon Schoch (SUI)	W
13	Nevin Galmarini (SUI)	+6.83
3	Aaron March (ITA)	+9.09
14	Rok Flander (SLO)	W
6	Roland Fischnaller (ITA)	W
11	Rok Marguč (SLO)	+0.39
7	Kaspar Flütsch (SUI)	W
10	Justin Reiter (USA)	+9.39
2	Žan Košir (SLO)	W
15	Anton Unterkofler (AUT)	+0.70

Quarterfinals
1	Andreas Prommegger (AUT)	+9.60
8	Benjamin Karl (AUT)	W
5	Vic Wild (RUS)	W
4	Simon Schoch (SUI)	+0.21
14	Rok Flander (SLO)	+0.24
6	Roland Fischnaller (ITA)	W
7	Kaspar Flütsch (SUI)	+0.75
2	Žan Košir (SLO)	W

Semifinals
8	Benjamin Karl (AUT)	W
5	Vic Wild (RUS)	+0.51
6	Roland Fischnaller (ITA)	W
2	Žan Košir (SLO)	+0.29

Finals
8	Benjamin Karl (AUT)	W
6	Roland Fischnaller (ITA)	+1.75
Third place
5	Vic Wild (RUS)	W
2	Žan Košir (SLO)	+0.11
