= FIS Snowboarding World Championships 2013 – Men's parallel slalom =

The men's parallel slalom competition of the FIS Snowboarding World Championships 2013 was held in Stoneham-et-Tewkesbury, Quebec on January 27, 2013. 53 athletes from 21 countries competed.

== Medalists ==
Gold	Rok Marguč; Slovenia (SLO)
Silver	Justin Reiter; United States (USA)
Bronze	Roland Fischnaller; Italy (ITA)

== Results ==
=== Qualification ===
Each participant takes one run on either of the courses. After the first run, only the top 32 are allowed a second run on the opposite course.

Rank	Bib	Name	Country	Blue Course	Red Course	Overall Time	Notes
1	8	Andreas Prommegger	Austria	34.02	35.81	1:09.83	Q
2	16	Aaron March	Italy	34.38	36.04	1:10.42	Q
3	7	Roland Fischnaller	Italy	35.09	35.48	1:10.57	Q
4	24	Sylvain Dufour	France	34.54	36.15	1:10.69	Q
5	20	Rok Marguč	Slovenia	34.20	36.51	1:10.71	Q
6	4	Simon Schoch	Switzerland	34.72	36.04	1:10.76	Q
7	5	Justin Reiter	United States	36.31	34.50	1:10.81	Q
8	13	Ingemar Walder	Austria	36.12	34.69	1:10.81	Q
9	3	Benjamin Karl	Austria	35.78	35.13	1:10.91	Q
10	18	Jasey-Jay Anderson	Canada	34.86	36.18	1:11.04	Q
11	33	Roland Haldi	Switzerland	35.71	35.33	1:11.04	Q
12	11	Andrey Sobolev	Russia	35.58	35.48	1:11.06	Q
13	1	Kaspar Flütsch	Switzerland	36.14	35.03	1:11.17	Q
14	25	Matthew Morison	Canada	35.86	35.45	1:11.31	Q
15	6	Nevin Galmarini	Switzerland	35.06	36.59	1:11.65	Q
16	17	Jernej Demšar	Slovenia	36.35	35.46	1:11.81	Q
17	19	Aleksandr Belkin	Russia	35.82	36.05	1:11.87	
18	29	Michael Lambert	Canada	36.35	35.68	1:12.03	
19	15	Vic Wild	Russia	35.97	36.06	1:12.03	
20	45	Lee Sang-Ho	South Korea	35.96	36.64	1:12.60	
21	32	Yosyf Penyak	Ukraine	36.18	36.71	1:12.89	
22	31	Steve Barlow	Canada	36.36	37.04	1:13.40	
23	21	Stefan Baumeister	Germany	36.98	36.98	1:13.96	
24	34	Kim Sang-Kyum	South Korea	37.18	37.14	1:14.32	
25	26	Stanislav Detkov	Russia	34.30	40.03	1:14.33	
26	2	Patrick Bussler	Germany	34.75	40.99	1:15.74	
27	14	Siegfried Grabner	Austria	34.82	42.92	1:17.74	
28	12	Lukas Mathies	Austria	35.52	43.42	1:18.94	
29	22	Meinhard Erlacher	Italy	35.56	DSQ		
30	30	Christoph Mick	Italy	36.13	DSQ		
31	10	Žan Košir	Slovenia	36.31	DNS		
32	43	Adam McLeish	Great Britain	DNF	37.05		
33	27	Masaki Shiba	Japan		37.59		
34	40	Radoslav Yankov	Bulgaria	37.61			
35	23	Alexander Bergmann	Germany		37.63		
36	36	Choi Bo-Gun	South Korea	37.88			
37	38	Oleksandr Belinskyy	Ukraine	38.13			
37	37	Converse Fields	United States		38.13		
39	51	Zhang Xuan	China		38.74		
40	28	Michael Trapp	United States	38.84			
41	52	Ding Jie	China	38.89			
42	48	Bi Ye	China	39.34			
43	42	Albert Jelínek	Czech Republic	39.81			
44	50	Viktor Brůžek	Czech Republic	39.83			
45	41	Petr Šindelář	Czech Republic		40.04		
46	47	Marcell Pátkai	Hungary		42.54		
47	49	Ryan Espiritu	Philippines		42.75		
48	44	Richard Wilkes	Australia	44.59			
	53	Mert Işık	Turkey		DNF		
	46	Revaz Nazgaidze	Georgia	DNF			
	9	Rok Flander	Slovenia		DNF		
	39	Aaron Muss	United States		DSQ		
	35	Shin Bong-Shik	South Korea		DSQ		

=== Elimination round ===
Round of 16
1	Andreas Prommegger (AUT)	W
16	Jernej Demšar (SLO)	+0.98
8	Ingemar Walder (AUT)	DSQ
9	Benjamin Karl (AUT)	W
5	Rok Marguč (SLO)	W
12	Andrey Sobolev (RUS)	+0.53
4	Sylvain Dufour (FRA)	DSQ
13	Kaspar Flütsch (SUI)	W
3	Roland Fischnaller (ITA)	W
14	Matthew Morison (CAN)	DSQ
6	Simon Schoch (SUI)	W
11	Roland Haldi (SUI)	DSQ
7	Justin Reiter (USA)	W
10	Jasey-Jay Anderson (CAN)	+2.64
2	Aaron March (ITA)	+6.49
15	Nevin Galmarini (SUI)	W

Quarterfinals
1	Andreas Prommegger (AUT)	W
9	Benjamin Karl (AUT)	+4.28
5	Rok Marguč (SLO)	W
13	Kaspar Flütsch (SUI)	+1.42
3	Roland Fischnaller (ITA)	W
6	Simon Schoch (SUI)	+1.35
7	Justin Reiter (USA)	W
15	Nevin Galmarini (SUI)	+0.22

Semifinals
1	Andreas Prommegger (AUT)	+1.18
5	Rok Marguč (SLO)	W
3	Roland Fischnaller (ITA)	DSQ
7	Justin Reiter (USA)	W

Finals
5	Rok Marguč (SLO)	W
7	Justin Reiter (USA)	+0.60
Third place
1	Andreas Prommegger (AUT)	DSQ
3	Roland Fischnaller (ITA)	W
