= FIS Snowboarding World Championships 2011 – Men's parallel slalom =

The men's parallel slalom competition of the FIS Snowboarding World Championships 2011 was held in La Molina, Spain on January 22, 2011. 52 athletes from 22 countries competed.

== Results ==
=== Qualification ===
The following are the results of the qualification. Each participant takes one run on either of the courses. After the first run, only the top 32 are allowed a second run on the opposite course.

Rank	Bib	Name	Country	Blue Course	Red Course	Overall Time	Note
1	15	Simon Schoch	Switzerland	33.60	32.56	1:06.16	Q
2	14	Benjamin Karl	Austria	32.85	33.39	1:06.24	Q
3	5	Andreas Prommegger	Austria	33.65	32.84	1:06.49	Q
4	16	Rok Marguč	Slovenia	33.00	33.50	1:06.50	Q
5	10	Stanislav Detkov	Russia	32.94	33.72	1:06.66	Q
6	4	Roland Fischnaller	Italy	33.12	33.61	1:06.73	Q
7	40	Manuel Veith	Austria	33.72	33.05	1:06.77	Q
8	17	Zan Kosir	Slovenia	33.41	33.46	1:06.87	Q
9	2	Matthew Morison	Canada	33.25	33.75	1:07.00	Q
10	9	Aaron March	Italy	33.88	33.24	1:07.12	Q
11	13	Michael Lambert	Canada	34.11	33.08	1:07.19	Q
12	6	Kaspar Flütsch	Switzerland	33.78	33.43	1:07.21	Q
13	22	Izidor Sustersic	Slovenia	33.41	34.05	1:07.46	Q
14	20	Aleksandr Belkin	Russia	33.29	34.19	1:07.48	Q
15	8	Roland Haldi	Switzerland	33.38	34.11	1:07.49	Q
16	1	Rok Flander	Slovenia	34.29	33.24	1:07.53	Q
17	21	Yosyf Penyak	Ukraine	33.89	33.71	1:07.60	
18	19	Vic Wild	United States	33.76	33.90	1:07.66	
19	18	Patrick Bussler	Germany	33.77	33.97	1:07.74	
20	3	Tyler Jewell	United States	33.95	33.83	1:07.78	
21	11	Siegfried Grabner	Austria	34.49	33.53	1:08.02	
22	12	Nevin Galmarini	Switzerland	34.46	33.71	1:08.17	
23	35	Petr Sindelar	Czech Republic	34.63	34.27	1:08.90	
24	33	Adam McLeish	United Kingdom	34.74	34.19	1:08.93	
25	34	Ivan Rantchev	Bulgaria	35.08	34.66	1:09.74	
26	43	Kim Sang-Kyum	South Korea	35.36	34.45	1:09.81	
27	36	Choi Bo-Gun	South Korea	34.96	35.46	1:10.42	
28	25	Andrey Sobolev	Russia	37.59	33.73	1:11.32	
29	44	Boris Judin	Serbia	36.11	35.48	1:11.59	
30	28	Masaki Shiba	Japan	36.03	DSQ	-	
31	31	Denis Detkov	Russia	DNF	33.93	-	
32	30	Patrick Farrell	Canada	34.67	DNF	-	
33	37	Radoslav Yankov	Bulgaria		34.51	34.51	
34	27	Christoph Mick	Italy		34.87	34.87	
35	29	Michael Trapp	United States		34.91	34.91	
36	23	Meinhard Erlacher	Italy		35.08	35.08	
37	32	Garrett Sorteberg	United States	36.52		36.52	
38	51	Mikko Nuuttila	Finland		37.71	37.71	
39	41	Oleksandr Gaschpa	Ukraine		38.13	38.13	
40	48	Petr Sumegi	Hungary	38.26		38.26	
41	49	Marcell Patkai	Hungary		38.39	38.39	
42	46	Endre Papp	Hungary	38.81		38.81	
43	50	Adam Koosa	Hungary	38.85		38.85	
44	40	Volodymyr Stipakhno	Ukraine	39.34		39.34	
45	45	Adrian Teodorescu	Romania		42.07	42.07	
46	42	Revazi Nazgaidze	Georgia	43.30		43.30	
	24	Daniel Leitenstorfer	Austria	DSQ		DSQ	
	38	Marcin Wozniak	Poland	DSQ		DSQ	
	47	Lee Je-Jung	South Korea		DSQ	DSQ	
	52	Sandro Garcia Egoavil	Peru	DSQ		DSQ	
	26	Sylvain Dufour	France	DNF		DNF	
	39	Shin Bong-Shik	South Korea		DNF	DNF	

=== Elimination round ===
Round of 16
1	Schoch (SUI)
16	Flander (SLO)	+4.36
9	Morison (CAN)
8	Kosir (SLO)	+0.11
12	Flütsch (SUI)
5	Detkov (RUS)	+1.06
4	Marguč (SLO)
13	Sustersic (SLO)	+0.74
3	Prommegger (AUT)
14	Belkin (RUS)	+0.53
6	Fischnaller (ITA)
11	Lambert (CAN)	+0.11
7	Veith (AUT)
10	March (ITA)	+0.40
2	Karl (AUT)
15	Haldi (SUI)	+0.50

Quarterfinals
1	Schoch (SUI)
9	Morison (CAN)	+0.14
4	Marguč (SLO)
12	Flütsch (SUI)	DSQ
3	Prommegger (AUT)
6	Fischnaller (ITA)	+0.06
2	Karl (AUT)
7	Veith (AUT)	DSQ

Semifinals
1	Schoch (SUI)
4	Marguč (SLO)	+0.23
2	Karl (AUT)
3	Prommegger (AUT)	+0.28

Finals
2	Karl (AUT)
1	Schoch (SUI)	+2.91
Third place
4	Marguč (SLO)
3	Prommegger (AUT)	+0.40
