= FIS Freestyle Ski and Snowboarding World Championships 2015 – Men's parallel giant slalom =

The men's parallel giant slalom competition of the FIS Freestyle Ski and Snowboarding World Championships 2015 was held at Kreischberg, Austria on January 23 (qualifying and finals). 53 athletes from 20 countries competed.

== Results ==
=== Qualification ===
Each participant takes one run on either of the courses. After the first run, only the top 16 are allowed a second run on the opposite course.

Rank	Bib	Name	Country	Blue Course	Red Course	Overall Time	Notes
1	35	Edwin Coratti	Italy	35.30	34.70	1:10.00	Q
2	31	Lukas Mathies	Austria	35.53	34.68	1:10.21	Q
3	21	Žan Košir	Slovenia	35.32	35.02	1:10.34	Q
4	39	Andrey Sobolev	Russia	35.70	34.65	1:10.35	Q
5	29	Rok Marguč	Slovenia	35.50	34.87	1:10.37	Q
6	41	Jasey-Jay Anderson	Canada	35.09	35.34	1:10.43	Q
7	48	Lee Sang-Ho	South Korea	35.48	35.06	1:10.54	Q
8	20	Benjamin Karl	Austria	35.43	35.11	1:10.54	Q
9	24	Patrick Bussler	Germany	35.71	34.87	1:10.58	Q
10	17	Anton Unterkofler	Austria	35.81	34.80	1:10.61	Q
11	30	Andreas Prommegger	Austria	35.08	35.58	1:10.66	Q
12	28	Vic Wild	Russia	35.54	35.13	1:10.67	Q
13	32	Nevin Galmarini	Switzerland	35.19	35.49	1:10.68	Q
14	22	Aaron March	Italy	35.47	35.46	1:10.93	Q
15	34	Valery Kolegov	Russia	35.68	35.64	1:11.32	Q
16	40	Rok Flander	Slovenia	36.36	35.14	1:11.50	Q
17	38	Masaki Shiba	Japan	36.29	35.24	1:11.53	
18	25	Sylvain Dufour	France	35.85	35.83	1:11.68	
19	23	Alexander Bergmann	Germany	35.89	35.80	1:11.69	
20	44	Kentaro Yoshioka	Japan	36.79	34.98	1:11.77	
21	46	Darren Gardner	Canada	36.07	35.75	1:11.82	
22	19	Roland Fischnaller	Italy	36.57	35.27	1:11.84	
23	33	Sebastian Kislinger	Austria	36.09	35.79	1:11.88	
23	52	Choi Bo-Gun	South Korea	36.08	35.80	1:11.88	
25	56	Yosyf Penyak	Ukraine	35.87	36.25	1:12.12	
26	49	Konstantin Shipilov	Russia	36.57	35.74	1:12.31	
27	51	Kim Sang-Kyum	South Korea	36.56	35.89	1:12.45	
28	27	Justin Reiter	United States	37.15	35.52	1:12.67	
29	54	Roman Aleksandrovskyy	Ukraine	37.03	36.83	1:13.86	
30	18	Tim Mastnak	Slovenia	36.17	43.53	1:19.70	
31	37	Kaspar Flütsch	Switzerland	DSQ	35.61	DSQ	
32	53	Radoslav Yankov	Bulgaria	DNF	35.66	DNF	
33	45	Indrik Trahan	Canada		36.30	36.30	
34	43	Silvan Flepp	Switzerland		36.73	36.73	
35	26	Stefan Baumeister	Germany	37.26		37.26	
36	55	Tomasz Kowalczyk	Poland		37.34	37.34	
37	47	Michael Trapp	United States		37.53	37.53	
38	50	Shin Bong-Shik	South Korea	37.54		37.54	
39	65	Taras Bihus	Ukraine		38.17	38.17	
40	60	Bi Ye	China	38.76		38.76	
41	66	Qiao Yu	China	38.79		38.79	
42	57	Oleksandr Belinskyy	Ukraine		38.86	38.86	
43	59	Viktor Brůžek	Czech Republic		39.03	39.03	
43	42	Daniel Weis	Germany	39.03		39.03	
45	69	Rollan Sadykov	Kazakhstan		39.16	39.16	
46	61	Péter Sümegi	Hungary		39.84	39.84	
47	62	Rahmatollah Moghdid	Iran	39.89		39.89	
48	36	Mirko Felicetti	Italy	40.02		40.02	
49	63	Seiyed-Hossein Seid	Iran		40.04	40.04	
50	58	Matej Bačo	Slovakia	40.26		40.26	
51	64	Endre Papp	Hungary	41.28		41.28	
52	67	Vladimír Bella	Slovakia		50.41	50.41	
	68	Leoš Prokopec	Czech Republic	DNF		DNF	

=== Elimination round ===
Round of 16
4	Andrey Sobolev (RUS)	W
13	Nevin Galmarini (SUI)	+0.53
5	Rok Marguč (SLO)	+0.07
12	Vic Wild (RUS)	W
8	Benjamin Karl (AUT)	W
9	Patrick Bussler (GER)	+0.16
1	Edwin Coratti (ITA)	DSQ
16	Rok Flander (SLO)	W
2	Lukas Mathies (AUT)	+0.46
15	Valery Kolegov (RUS)	W
7	Lee Sang-Ho (KOR)	+2.01
10	Anton Unterkofler (AUT)	W
6	Jasey-Jay Anderson (CAN)	W
11	Andreas Prommegger (AUT)	+0.34
3	Žan Košir (SLO)	W
14	Aaron March (ITA)	+0.65

Quarterfinals
4	Andrey Sobolev (RUS)	W
12	Vic Wild (RUS)	+0.39
8	Benjamin Karl (AUT)	W
16	Rok Flander (SLO)	+0.65
15	Valery Kolegov (RUS)	W
10	Anton Unterkofler (AUT)	+0.71
6	Jasey-Jay Anderson (CAN)	+2.72
3	Žan Košir (SLO)	W

Semifinals
4	Andrey Sobolev (RUS)	W
8	Benjamin Karl (AUT)	+0.32
15	Valery Kolegov (RUS)	+0.55
3	Žan Košir (SLO)	W

Finals
4	Andrey Sobolev (RUS)	W
3	Žan Košir (SLO)	+0.37
Third place
8	Benjamin Karl (AUT)	W
15	Valery Kolegov (RUS)	+0.22
