= FIS Snowboarding World Championships 2011 – Men's parallel giant slalom =

The men's parallel giant slalom competition of the FIS Snowboarding World Championships 2011 was held in La Molina, Spain on January 19, 2011. 58 athletes from 24 countries competed.

== Results ==
=== Qualification ===
Each participant takes one run on either of the courses. After the first run, only the top 32 are allowed a second run on the opposite course.

Rank	Bib	Name	Country	Blue Course	Red Course	Overall Time	Notes
1	5	Rok Marguč	Slovenia	42.24	41.34	1:23.58	Q
2	15	Roland Fischnaller	Italy	42.43	41.88	1:24.31	Q
3	10	Benjamin Karl	Austria	41.58	42.91	1:24.49	Q
4	11	Nevin Galmarini	Switzerland	42.25	42.70	1:24.95	Q
5	1	Kaspar Flütsch	Switzerland	42.88	42.47	1:25.35	Q
6	7	Anton Unterkofler	Austria	43.22	42.27	1:25.49	Q
7	6	Zan Kosir	Slovenia	42.44	43.10	1:25.54	Q
8	12	Stanislav Detkov	Russia	41.88	43.71	1:25.59	Q
9	18	Vic Wild	United States	42.65	42.97	1:25.62	Q
10	25	Sylvain Dufour	France	42.51	43.62	1:26.13	Q
11	2	Aaron March	Italy	41.93	44.32	1;26.25	Q
12	21	Izidor Sustersic	Slovenia	42.73	43.61	1:26.34	Q
13	14	Roland Haldi	Switzerland	42.95	43.45	1:26.40	Q
14	26	Christoph Mick	Italy	43.16	43.29	1:26.45	Q
15	17	Patrick Bussler	Germany	43.31	43.31	1:26.62	Q
16	16	Manuel Veith	Austria	42.39	44.32	1:26.71	Q
17	9	Rok Flander	Slovenia	43.47	43.36	1:26.83	
18	19	Aleksandr Belkin	Russia	43.26	43.61	1:26.87	
19	3	Tyler Jewell	United States	43.21	43.90	1:27.11	
20	4	Andreas Prommegger	Austria	44.77	42.43	1:27.20	
21	20	Yosyf Penyak	Ukraine	43.74	44.09	1:27.83	
22	34	Petr Sindelar	Czech Republic	44.22	43.62	1:27.84	
23	33	Ivan Rantchev	Bulgaria	44.25	44.43	1:28.68	
24	30	Denis Detkov	Russia	46.02	43.07	1:29.09	
25	28	Michael Trapp	United States	45.11	44.03	1:29.14	
26	41	Albert Jelínek	Czech Republic	43.71	45.90	1:29.61	
27	43	Kim Sang-Kyum	South Korea	46.07	43.68	1:29.75	
28	24	Andrey Sobolev	Russia	47.51	43.08	1:30.59	
29	38	Shin Bong-Shik	South Korea	45.58	46.64	1:32.22	
30	13	Michael Lambert	Canada	52.82	42.85	1:35.67	
31	32	Adam McLeish	United Kingdom	44.62	DSQ	-	
32	23	Meinhard Erlacher	Italy	DNF	42.35	-	
33	37	Marcin Woźniak	Poland		46.11	46.11	
34	35	Choi Bo-Gun	South Korea		46.51	46.51	
35	45	Boris Judin	Serbia		46.70	46.70	
36	57	Mikko Nuuttila	Finland		46.91	46.91	
37	53	Li Chunhui	China		47.25	47.25	
38	31	Garrett Sorteberg	United States		47.29	47.29	
39	49	Lee Je-jung	South Korea		47.31	47.31	
40	39	Volodymyr Stipakhno	Ukraine		47.70	47.70	
41	40	Oleksandr Gaschparovych	Ukraine	47.98		47.98	
42	50	Ding Jie	China	48.19		48.19	
43	22	Philipp Schoch	Switzerland	48.85		48.85	
44	42	Revazi Nazgaidze	Georgia	49.48		49.48	
45	47	Adrian Teodorescu	Romania		49.97	49.97	
46	51	Péter Sümegi	Hungary		50.07	50.07	
47	46	Guo Lin	China	50.25		50.25	
48	29	Patrick Farrell	Canada		50.48	50.48	
49	55	Marcell Pátkai	Hungary		51.03	51.03	
50	56	Ádám Koosa	Hungary	51.80		51.80	
51	36	Radoslav Yankov	Bulgaria	52.26		52.26	
52	48	Endre Papp	Hungary	54.27		54.27	
53	54	Anastassios Zarkadas	Greece	57.37		57.37	
	8	Matthew Morison	Canada	DSQ		DSQ	
	27	Masaki Shiba	Japan		DNF	DNF	
	44	Viktor Brůžek	Czech Republic	DNF		DNF	
	52	Andrei Subran	Romania	DNS		DNS	
	58	Sandro García Egoavil	Peru	DNS		DNS	

=== Elimination round ===
Round of 16
1	Marguč (SLO)
16	Veith (AUT)	DSQ
8	Detkov (RUS)
9	Wild (USA)	+0.66
5	Flütsch (SUI)
12	Sustersic (SLO)	+1.34
13	Haldi (SUI)
4	Galmarini (SUI)	+0.37
3	Karl (AUT)
14	Mick (ITA)	+1.80
11	March (ITA)	+7.13
6	Unterkofler (AUT)
7	Kosir (SLO)
10	Dufour (FRA)	+0.32
15	Bussler (GER)	+0.84
2	Fischnaller (ITA)

Quarterfinals
1	Marguč (SLO)
8	Detkov (RUS)	+0.19
5	Flütsch (SUI)
13	Haldi (SUI)	+0.23
3	Karl (AUT)
6	Unterkofler (AUT)	+4.08
2	Fischnaller (ITA)
7	Kosir (SLO)	+7.69

Semifinals
1	Marguč (SLO)
5	Flütsch (SUI)	+9.51
3	Karl (AUT)
2	Fischnaller (ITA)	+3.11

Finals
1	Marguč (SLO)	+1.44
3	Karl (AUT)
Third place
2	Fischnaller (ITA)
5	Flütsch (SUI)	+0.82
