= FIS Freestyle Ski and Snowboarding World Championships 2015 – Men's parallel slalom =

The men's parallel slalom competition of the FIS Freestyle Ski and Snowboarding World Championships 2015 was held at Kreischberg, Austria on January 22 (qualifying and finals). 52 athletes from 20 countries competed.

== Results ==
=== Qualification ===
Each participant takes one run on either of the courses. After the first run, only the top 16 are allowed a second run on the opposite course.

Rank	Bib	Name	Country	Blue Course	Red Course	Overall Time	Notes
1	18	Žan Košir	Slovenia	35.32	36.05	1:11.37	Q
2	17	Roland Fischnaller	Italy	36.47	35.11	1:11.58	Q
3	27	Lukas Mathies	Austria	35.60	36.00	1:11.60	Q
4	35	Kaspar Flütsch	Switzerland	36.10	35.76	1:11.86	Q
5	22	Aaron March	Italy	35.81	36.34	1:12.15	Q
6	20	Benjamin Karl	Austria	35.96	36.22	1:12.18	Q
7	29	Vic Wild	Russia	36.01	36.25	1:12.26	Q
8	39	Andrey Sobolev	Russia	36.43	35.84	1:12.27	Q
9	24	Christoph Mick	Italy	36.13	36.15	1:12.28	Q
10	21	Andreas Prommegger	Austria	36.83	35.47	1:12.30	Q
11	26	Rok Marguč	Slovenia	36.06	36.52	1:12.58	Q
12	38	Stanislav Detkov	Russia	36.41	36.24	1:12.65	Q
13	34	Mirko Felicetti	Italy	37.00	35.70	1:12.70	Q
14	33	Justin Reiter	United States	37.16	35.92	1:13.08	Q
15	28	Stefan Baumeister	Germany	37.29	35.99	1:13.28	Q
16	41	Daniel Weis	Germany	36.81	36.64	1:13.45	Q
17	42	Silvan Flepp	Switzerland	36.34	37.16	1:13.50	
18	36	Masaki Shiba	Japan	37.19	36.33	1:13.52	
19	23	Alexander Bergmann	Germany	37.75	35.84	1:13.59	
20	32	Patrick Bussler	Germany	36.26	37.35	1:13.61	
21	25	Sebastian Kislinger	Austria	37.56	36.18	1:13.74	
22	40	Jure Hafner	Slovenia	36.41	37.35	1:13.76	
23	31	Sylvain Dufour	France	37.15	36.63	1:13.78	
24	37	Jasey-Jay Anderson	Canada	37.19	36.69	1:13.88	
25	48	Lee Sang-Ho	South Korea	36.92	37.02	1:13.94	
26	49	Konstantin Shipilov	Russia	36.95	37.00	1:13.95	
27	53	Radoslav Yankov	Bulgaria	37.41	37.00	1:14.41	
28	19	Tim Mastnak	Slovenia	38.70	36.43	1:15.13	
29	44	Indrik Trahan	Canada	37.72	37.57	1:15.29	
30	52	Choi Bo-Gun	South Korea	37.79	37.54	1:15.33	
31	47	Michael Trapp	United States	38.49	36.99	1:15.48	
32	54	Roman Aleksandrovskyy	Ukraine	37.73	DNF	DNF	
33	45	Darren Gardner	Canada		37.56	37.56	
33	43	Kentaro Yoshioka	Japan		37.56	37.56	
35	51	Kim Sang-Kyum	South Korea		37.85	37.85	
36	57	Oleksandr Belinskyy	Ukraine		38.33	38.33	
37	46	Jernej Demšar	Slovenia	38.34		38.34	
38	56	Yosyf Penyak	Ukraine	38.46		38.46	
39	55	Tomasz Kowalczyk	Poland		38.93	38.93	
40	60	Bi Ye	China	39.42		39.42	
41	59	Viktor Brůžek	Czech Republic		39.47	39.47	
42	67	Zhang Xuan	China		39.70	39.70	
43	65	Taras Bihus	Ukraine		40.15	40.15	
44	68	Rollan Sadykov	Kazakhstan	42.26		42.26	
45	63	Seiyed-Hossein Seid	Iran		42.89	42.89	
46	61	Péter Sümegi	Hungary		43.53	43.53	
47	64	Endre Papp	Hungary	43.78		43.78	
48	58	Matej Bačo	Slovakia	46.06		46.06	
49	66	Martin Glajch	Czech Republic	46.75		46.75	
	62	Rahmatollah Moghdid	Iran	DNF		DNF	
	50	Shin Bong-Shik	South Korea	DNF		DNF	
	30	Nevin Galmarini	Switzerland	DSQ		DSQ	

=== Elimination round ===
Round of 16
4	Kaspar Flütsch (SUI)	+0.05
13	Mirko Felicetti (ITA)	W
5	Aaron March (ITA)	W
12	Stanislav Detkov (RUS)	+0.57
8	Andrey Sobolev (RUS)	W
9	Christoph Mick (ITA)	+0.30
1	Žan Košir (SLO)	W
16	Daniel Weis (GER)	+0.32
2	Roland Fischnaller (ITA)	W
15	Stefan Baumeister (GER)	+0.23
7	Vic Wild (RUS)	W
10	Andreas Prommegger (AUT)	DSQ
6	Benjamin Karl (AUT)	+0.29
11	Rok Marguč (SLO)	W
3	Lukas Mathies (AUT)	W
14	Justin Reiter (USA)	+7.19

Quarterfinals
13	Mirko Felicetti (ITA)	+0.05
5	Aaron March (ITA)	W
8	Andrey Sobolev (RUS)	W
1	Žan Košir (SLO)	+0.51
2	Roland Fischnaller (ITA)	W
7	Vic Wild (RUS)	+0.59
11	Rok Marguč (SLO)	W
3	Lukas Mathies (AUT)	DSQ

Semifinals
5	Aaron March (ITA)	+0.04
8	Andrey Sobolev (RUS)	W
2	Roland Fischnaller (ITA)	W
11	Rok Marguč (SLO)	+0.40

Finals
8	Andrey Sobolev (RUS)	+0.16
2	Roland Fischnaller (ITA)	W
Third place
5	Aaron March (ITA)	+0.59
11	Rok Marguč (SLO)	W
