= FIS Freestyle Ski and Snowboarding World Championships 2017 – Men's parallel slalom =

The men's parallel slalom competition of the FIS Freestyle Ski and Snowboarding World Championships 2017 was held at Sierra Nevada, Spain on March 15 (qualifying and finals). 56 athletes from 20 countries competed.

== Results ==
=== Qualification ===
Each participant takes one run on either of the courses. After the first run, only the top 32 are allowed a second run on the opposite course.

Rank	Bib	Name	Country	Blue Course	Red Course	Overall Time	Notes
1	13	Benjamin Karl	Austria	30.72	30.42	1:01.14	Q
2	4	Nevin Galmarini	Switzerland	30.77	30.79	1:01.56	Q
3	1	Andreas Prommegger	Austria	31.27	30.67	1:01.94	Q
4	2	Andrey Sobolev	Russia	30.75	31.21	1:01.96	Q
5	12	Roland Fischnaller	Italy	30.79	31.20	1:01.99	Q
6	11	Aaron March	Italy	31.68	30.44	1:02.12	Q
7	10	Radoslav Yankov	Bulgaria	31.41	30.86	1:02.27	Q
8	24	Patrick Bussler	Germany	31.18	31.26	1:02.44	Q
9	15	Kaspar Flütsch	Switzerland	31.69	30.90	1:02.59	Q
10	20	Stefan Baumeister	Germany	31.19	31.44	1:02.63	Q
11	43	Oskar Kwiatkowski	Poland	32.08	30.64	1:02.72	Q
12	17	Vic Wild	Russia	31.54	31.34	1:02.88	Q
13	3	Mirko Felicetti	Italy	31.32	31.60	1:02.92	Q
14	18	Alexander Payer	Austria	31.68	31.35	1:03.03	Q
15	23	Konstantin Shipilov	Russia	31.44	31.64	1:03.08	Q
16	14	Rok Marguč	Slovenia	31.92	31.24	1:03.16	Q
17	33	Jure Hafner	Slovenia	31.76	31.45	1:03.21	
18	21	Choi Bo-Gun	South Korea	32.01	31.28	1:03.29	
19	9	Lee Sang-Ho	South Korea	32.83	30.57	1:03.40	
20	25	Michael Trapp	United States	31.95	31.46	1:03.41	
21	28	Darren Gardner	Canada	31.62	31.86	1:03.48	
22	6	Sebastian Kislinger	Austria	30.81	32.76	1:03.57	
22	8	Sylvain Dufour	France	31.68	31.89	1:03.57	
24	34	Sébastien Beaulieu	Canada	31.30	32.33	1:03.63	
25	42	Bi Ye	China	32.16	31.52	1:03.68	
26	5	Dario Caviezel	Switzerland	33.84	30.36	1:04.20	
27	36	David Müller	Switzerland	31.98	33.73	1:05.71	
28	35	Robert Burns	United States	37.51	31.24	1:08.75	
29	27	Masaki Shiba	Japan	DSQ	30.85	DSQ	
30	38	Christian Hupfauer	Germany	31.30	DSQ	DSQ	
31	7	Christoph Mick	Italy	DSQ	31.64	DSQ	
32	30	Tim Mastnak	Slovenia	31.79	DSQ	DSQ	
33	37	Shinnosuke Kamino	Japan		31.68	31.68	
34	26	Justin Reiter	United States	32.32		32.32	
35	46	Tomasz Kowalczyk	Poland	32.63		32.63	
36	47	Marcell Pátkai	Hungary		32.78	32.78	
37	39	Ji Myung-kon	South Korea		32.83	32.83	
37	41	Črt Ikovic	Slovenia		32.83	32.83	
39	29	Dmitry Loginov	Russia		32.90	32.90	
40	44	Michał Nowaczyk	Poland	32.96		32.96	
41	45	Oleksandr Belinskyy	Ukraine		33.24	33.24	
42	32	Jasey-Jay Anderson	Canada	33.28		33.28	
43	49	Sun Huan	China		33.58	33.58	
44	31	Aaron Muss	United States		33.62	33.62	
45	55	Albert Jelínek	Czech Republic		33.72	33.72	
46	51	Viktor Brůžek	Czech Republic		34.15	34.15	
47	22	Kim Sang-Kyum	South Korea	34.34		34.34	
48	53	Ryan Espiritu	Philippines		34.41	34.41	
49	40	Zhang Xuan	China	34.47		34.47	
50	56	Endre Papp	Hungary	35.96		35.96	
51	50	Wu Pengtao	China	36.18		36.18	
52	52	Hamza Polat	Turkey	40.39		40.39	
	54	Adam Pocinek	Czech Republic	DSQ		DSQ	
	48	Revaz Nazgaidze	Georgia	DSQ		DSQ	
	19	Alexander Bergmann	Germany		DSQ	DSQ	
	16	Maurizio Bormolini	Italy	DSQ		DSQ	

=== Elimination round ===
Round of 16
4	Andrey Sobolev (RUS)	W
13	Mirko Felicetti (ITA)	DSQ
5	Roland Fischnaller (ITA)	+0.72
12	Vic Wild (RUS)	W
8	Patrick Bussler (GER)	W
9	Kaspar Flütsch (SUI)	DSQ
1	Benjamin Karl (AUT)	W
16	Rok Marguč (SLO)	+0.42
2	Nevin Galmarini (SUI)	W
15	Konstantin Shipilov (RUS)	+1.69
7	Radoslav Yankov (BUL)	W
10	Stefan Baumeister (GER)	+0.44
6	Aaron March (ITA)	W
11	Oskar Kwiatkowski (POL)	DSQ
3	Andreas Prommegger (AUT)	W
14	Alexander Payer (AUT)	+0.19

Quarterfinals
4	Andrey Sobolev (RUS)	W
12	Vic Wild (RUS)	+0.08
8	Patrick Bussler (GER)	+0.57
1	Benjamin Karl (AUT)	W
2	Nevin Galmarini (SUI)	W
7	Radoslav Yankov (BUL)	+0.36
6	Aaron March (ITA)	+0.64
3	Andreas Prommegger (AUT)	W

Semifinals
4	Andrey Sobolev (RUS)	+0.73
1	Benjamin Karl (AUT)	W
2	Nevin Galmarini (SUI)	+0.05
3	Andreas Prommegger (AUT)	W

Finals
1	Benjamin Karl (AUT)	+0.16
3	Andreas Prommegger (AUT)	W
Third place
4	Andrey Sobolev (RUS)	W
2	Nevin Galmarini (SUI)	+0.02
