= FIS Freestyle Ski and Snowboarding World Championships 2017 – Men's parallel giant slalom =

The men's parallel giant slalom competition of the FIS Freestyle Ski and Snowboarding World Championships 2017 was held at Sierra Nevada, Spain on March 16 (qualifying and finals). 55 athletes from 20 countries competed.

== Results ==
=== Qualification ===
Each participant takes one run on either of the courses. After the first run, only the top 32 are allowed a second run on the opposite course.

| Rank | Bib | Name | Country | Blue Course | Red Course | Overall Time | Notes |
|---|---|---|---|---|---|---|---|
| 1 | 13 | Radoslav Yankov | Bulgaria | 40.32 | 39.54 | 1:19.86 | Q |
| 2 | 12 | Andreas Prommegger | Austria | 39.88 | 40.67 | 1:20.55 | Q |
| 3 | 16 | Nevin Galmarini | Switzerland | 39.67 | 41.02 | 1:20.69 | Q |
| 4 | 5 | Benjamin Karl | Austria | 40.39 | 40.37 | 1:20.76 | Q |
| 5 | 1 | Lee Sang-Ho | South Korea | 41.01 | 39.84 | 1:20.85 | Q |
| 6 | 4 | Vic Wild | Russia | 40.21 | 40.66 | 1:20.87 | Q |
| 7 | 25 | Jasey-Jay Anderson | Canada | 40.43 | 40.73 | 1:21.16 | Q |
| 8 | 34 | Dmitry Loginov | Russia | 40.16 | 41.06 | 1:21.22 | Q |
| 9 | 7 | Sebastian Kislinger | Austria | 40.47 | 40.80 | 1:21.27 | Q |
| 10 | 33 | Justin Reiter | United States | 40.76 | 40.53 | 1:21.29 | Q |
| 11 | 31 | Shinnosuke Kamino | Japan | 40.79 | 40.64 | 1:21.43 | Q |
| 12 | 23 | Patrick Bussler | Germany | 40.99 | 40.68 | 1:21.67 | Q |
| 13 | 9 | Maurizio Bormolini | Italy | 41.48 | 40.25 | 1:21.73 | Q |
| 14 | 32 | Alexander Bergmann | Germany | 40.92 | 40.92 | 1:21.84 | Q |
| 15 | 10 | Mirko Felicetti | Italy | 40.68 | 41.17 | 1:21.85 | Q |
| 16 | 18 | Michael Trapp | United States | 40.33 | 41.57 | 1:21.90 | Q |
| 17 | 22 | Choi Bo-Gun | South Korea | 41.45 | 40.49 | 1:21.94 | |
| 18 | 11 | Aaron March | Italy | 41.61 | 40.43 | 1:22.04 | |
| 19 | 8 | Dario Caviezel | Switzerland | 41.15 | 41.04 | 1:22.19 | |
| 20 | 36 | Oskar Kwiatkowski | Poland | 40.86 | 41.47 | 1:22.33 | |
| 21 | 20 | Rok Marguč | Slovenia | 40.84 | 41.52 | 1:22.36 | |
| 22 | 26 | Valery Kolegov | Russia | 40.95 | 41.42 | 1:22.37 | |
| 22 | 15 | Stefan Baumeister | Germany | 42.03 | 40.47 | 1:22.50 | |
| 24 | 27 | Darren Gardner | Canada | 42.19 | 40.43 | 1:22.62 | |
| 24 | 19 | Christoph Mick | Italy | 42.02 | 40.60 | 1:22.62 | |
| 26 | 40 | Christian Hupfauer | Germany | 41.51 | 41.21 | 1:22.72 | |
| 27 | 28 | Aaron Muss | United States | 41.76 | 41.22 | 1:22.98 | |
| 28 | 30 | Jure Hafner | Slovenia | 41.41 | 42.74 | 1:24.15 | |
| 29 | 37 | Robert Burns | United States | 43.92 | 41.73 | 1:25.65 | |
| 30 | 6 | Kim Sang-Kyum | South Korea | 40.51 | 51.24 | 1:31.75 | |
| 31 | 21 | Alexander Payer | Austria | DSQ | 41.51 | DSQ | |
| 32 | 17 | Dmitry Sarsembaev | Russia | DSQ | 41.59 | DSQ | |
| 33 | 2 | Andrey Sobolev | Russia | 41.85 | | 41.85 | |
| 34 | 39 | Bi Ye | China | | 41.89 | 41.89 | |
| 35 | 14 | Sylvain Dufour | France | 42.05 | | 42.05 | |
| 36 | 41 | Ji Myung-kon | South Korea | | 42.44 | 42.44 | |
| 37 | 44 | Oleksandr Belinskyy | Ukraine | 42.58 | | 42.58 | |
| 38 | 46 | Tomasz Kowalczyk | Poland | 42.62 | | 42.62 | |
| 39 | 24 | Tim Mastnak | Slovenia | 42.77 | | 42.77 | |
| 40 | 45 | Michał Nowaczyk | Poland | | 42.86 | 42.86 | |
| 41 | 35 | Sébastien Beaulieu | Canada | | 43.09 | 43.09 | |
| 42 | 50 | Wu Pengtao | China | 43.22 | | 43.22 | |
| 43 | 49 | Sun Huan | China | | 43.28 | 43.28 | |
| 44 | 38 | David Müller | Switzerland | 43.79 | | 43.79 | |
| 45 | 53 | Ryan Espiritu | Philippines | | 45.00 | 45.00 | |
| 46 | 52 | Hamza Polat | Turkey | 45.17 | | 45.17 | |
| 47 | 42 | Zhang Xuan | China | 46.67 | | 46.67 | |
| 48 | 48 | Revaz Nazgaidze | Georgia | 47.31 | | 47.31 | |
| 49 | 47 | Marcell Pátkai | Hungary | | 47.75 | 47.75 | |
| 50 | 55 | Endre Papp | Hungary | | 53.81 | 53.81 | |
| | 54 | Adam Pocinek | Czech Republic | DSQ | | DSQ | |
| | 52 | Črt Ikovic | Slovenia | | DSQ | DSQ | |
| | 29 | Masaki Shiba | Japan | | DSQ | DSQ | |
| | 3 | Kaspar Flütsch | Switzerland | | DSQ | DSQ | |
| | 51 | Viktor Brůžek | Czech Republic | | DNF | DNF | |

=== Elimination round ===
Round of 16
4 | Benjamin Karl (AUT) | W
13 | Maurizio Bormolini (ITA) | DSQ
5 | Lee Sang-Ho (KOR) | W
12 | Patrick Bussler (GER) | +1.50
8 | Dmitry Loginov (RUS) | +0.04
9 | Sebastian Kislinger (AUT) | W
1 | Radoslav Yankov (BUL) | W
16 | Michael Trapp (USA) | +0.95
2 | Andreas Prommegger (AUT) | W
15 | Mirko Felicetti (ITA) | +0.31
7 | Jasey-Jay Anderson (CAN) | W
10 | Justin Reiter (USA) | +0.04
6 | Vic Wild (RUS) | W
11 | Shinnosuke Kamino (JPN) | +0.19
3 | Nevin Galmarini (SUI) | W
14 | Alexander Bergmann (GER) | +0.68

Quarterfinals
4 | Benjamin Karl (AUT) | W
5 | Lee Sang-Ho (KOR) | +2.54
9 | Sebastian Kislinger (AUT) | +0.57
1 | Radoslav Yankov (BUL) | W
2 | Andreas Prommegger (AUT) | W
7 | Jasey-Jay Anderson (CAN) | +0.28
6 | Vic Wild (RUS) | +0.31
3 | Nevin Galmarini (SUI) | W

Semifinals
4 | Benjamin Karl (AUT) | W
1 | Radoslav Yankov (BUL) | +0.02
2 | Andreas Prommegger (AUT) | W
3 | Nevin Galmarini (SUI) | +0.46

Finals
4 | Benjamin Karl (AUT) | +0.12
2 | Andreas Prommegger (AUT) | W
Third place
1 | Radoslav Yankov (BUL) | +0.30
3 | Nevin Galmarini (SUI) | W
