= Snowboarding at the 2014 Winter Olympics – Men's parallel slalom =

Men's parallel slalom at the XXII Olympic Winter Games
- Venue: Rosa Khutor Extreme Park
- Date: 22 February 2014
- Competitors: 32 from 12 nations

Medalists
1st place, gold medalist(s)		Vic Wild	Russia
2nd place, silver medalist(s)		Žan Košir	Slovenia
3rd place, bronze medalist(s)		Benjamin Karl	Austria

The men's parallel slalom competition of the Sochi 2014 Olympics was held at Rosa Khutor Extreme Park on 22 February 2014.

== Schedule ==
All times are (UTC+4).

Date	Time	Round
22 February	9:42	Qualification
22 February	13:27	1/8 finals
22 February	14:09	Quarterfinals
22 February	14:33	Semifinals
22 February	14:50	Finals

== Results ==
The event was started at 09:42.

=== Qualification ===
Rank	Bib	Name	Country	Red Course	Blue Course	Total	Notes
1	3	Vic Wild	Russia	28.20	29.76	57.96	Q
2	7	Žan Košir	Slovenia	28.74	30.18	58.92	Q
3	2	Lukas Mathies	Austria	29.48	29.45	58.93	Q
4	1	Benjamin Karl	Austria	28.81	30.14	58.95	Q
5	21	Patrick Bussler	Germany	29.34	29.67	59.01	Q
6	8	Simon Schoch	Switzerland	30.03	29.05	59.08	Q
7	9	Nevin Galmarini	Switzerland	29.05	30.08	59.13	Q
8	18	Kaspar Flütsch	Switzerland	30.14	29.24	59.38	Q
9	12	Roland Fischnaller	Italy	29.57	29.86	59.43	Q
10	11	Sylvain Dufour	France	29.73	29.70	59.43	Q
11	13	Aaron March	Italy	29.52	29.92	59.44	Q
12	5	Rok Marguč	Slovenia	29.78	29.74	59.52	Q
13	10	Andreas Prommegger	Austria	30.26	29.32	59.58	Q
14	23	Stefan Baumeister	Germany	29.70	30.02	59.72	Q
15	22	Jasey Jay Anderson	Canada	29.71	30.06	59.77	Q
16	17	Michael Lambert	Canada	29.61	30.19	59.80	Q
17	15	Anton Unterkofler	Austria	30.10	29.70	59.80	
18	4	Matthew Morison	Canada	30.00	29.96	59.96	
19	32	Yosyf Penyak	Ukraine	30.86	29.31	1:00.17	
20	24	Christoph Mick	Italy	30.15	30.07	1:00.22	
21	31	Radoslav Yankov	Bulgaria	30.19	30.05	1:00.24	
22	20	Rok Flander	Slovenia	30.64	29.66	1:00.30	
23	27	Shin Bong-shik	South Korea	29.76	30.56	1:00.32	
24	14	Alexander Bergmann	Germany	30.42	30.18	1:00.60	
25	25	Meinhard Erlacher	Italy	30.54	30.08	1:00.62	
26	29	Kim Sang-kyum	South Korea	31.06	31.29	1:02.35	
27	26	Andrey Sobolev	Russia	29.02	33.68	1:02.70	
28	16	Stanislav Detkov	Russia	31.03	DSQ	DSQ	DSQ
	30	Izidor Sustersic	Slovenia	DSQ	—	DSQ	DSQ
	28	Valery Kolegov	Russia	DSQ	—	DSQ	DSQ
	19	Philipp Schoch	Switzerland	—	DSQ	DSQ	DSQ
	6	Justin Reiter	United States	DSQ	—	DSQ	DSQ

=== Elimination round ===
1/8 finals
1	Wild (RUS)
16	Lambert (CAN)	+1.78
8	Flütsch (SUI)	+0.11
9	Fischnaller (ITA)
5	Bussler (GER)
12	Marguč (SLO)	+0.84
4	Karl (AUT)
13	Prommegger (AUT)	+0.19
3	Mathies (AUT)
14	Baumeister (GER)	+0.45
6	Schoch (SUI)	DSQ
11	March (ITA)
7	Galmarini (SUI)
10	Dufour (FRA)	DSQ
2	Košir (SLO)
15	Anderson (CAN)	+0.44

Quarterfinals
1	Wild (RUS)
9	Fischnaller (ITA)	+0.52
5	Bussler (GER)	+0.15
4	Karl (AUT)
3	Mathies (AUT)	+0.29
11	March (ITA)
7	Galmarini (SUI)	+0.20
2	Košir (SLO)

Semifinals
1	Wild (RUS)
4	Karl (AUT)	+0.04
11	March (ITA)	DSQ
2	Košir (SLO)

Finals
1	Wild (RUS)
2	Košir (SLO)	+0.11
Third place
4	Karl (AUT)
11	March (ITA)	+16.25

=== Final standings ===
Rank	Bib	Name	Country
1st place, gold medalist(s)	3	Vic Wild	Russia
2nd place, silver medalist(s)	7	Žan Košir	Slovenia
3rd place, bronze medalist(s)	1	Benjamin Karl	Austria
4	13	Aaron March	Italy
5	2	Lukas Mathies	Austria
6	21	Patrick Bussler	Germany
7	9	Nevin Galmarini	Switzerland
8	12	Roland Fischnaller	Italy
9	8	Simon Schoch	Switzerland
10	18	Kaspar Flütsch	Switzerland
11	11	Sylvain Dufour	France
12	5	Rok Marguč	Slovenia
13	10	Andreas Prommegger	Austria
14	23	Stefan Baumeister	Germany
15	22	Jasey Jay Anderson	Canada
16	17	Michael Lambert	Canada
17	15	Anton Unterkofler	Austria
18	4	Matthew Morison	Canada
19	32	Yosyf Penyak	Ukraine
20	24	Christoph Mick	Italy
21	31	Radoslav Yankov	Bulgaria
22	20	Rok Flander	Slovenia
23	27	Bong-Shik Shin	South Korea
24	14	Alexander Bergmann	Germany
25	25	Meinhard Erlacher	Italy
26	29	Sang-Kyum Kim	South Korea
27	26	Andrey Sobolev	Russia
28	16	Stanislav Detkov	Russia
29	30	Izidor Sustersic	Slovenia
30	28	Valery Kolegov	Russia
31	19	Philipp Schoch	Switzerland
32	6	Justin Reiter	United States
