= Snowboarding at the 2014 Winter Olympics – Men's parallel giant slalom =

Men's parallel giant slalom at the XXII Olympic Winter Games
- Venue: Rosa Khutor Extreme Park
- Date: 19 February 2014
- Competitors: 32 from 12 nations

Medalists
1st place, gold medalist(s)		Vic Wild	Russia
2nd place, silver medalist(s)		Nevin Galmarini	Switzerland
3rd place, bronze medalist(s)		Žan Košir	Slovenia

The men's parallel giant slalom competition of the Sochi 2014 Olympics was held at Rosa Khutor Extreme Park on 19 February 2014.

== Schedule ==
All times are (UTC+4).

Date	Time	Round
19 February	9:42	Qualification
19 February	13:12	1/8 finals
19 February	13:54	Quarterfinals
19 February	14:18	Semifinals
19 February	14:35	Finals

== Results ==
=== Qualification ===
The qualification was started at 09:42.

Rank	Bib	Name	Country	Red Course	Blue Course	Total	Notes
1	26	Andrey Sobolev	Russia	48.43	47.19	1:35.62	Q
2	7	Vic Wild	Russia	47.34	48.54	1:35.88	Q
3	21	Patrick Bussler	Germany	47.66	49.28	1:36.94	Q
4	3	Rok Marguč	Slovenia	48.58	48.75	1:37.33	Q
5	15	Benjamin Karl	Austria	48.03	49.41	1:37.44	Q
6	20	Rok Flander	Slovenia	49.72	47.81	1:37.53	Q
7	18	Kaspar Flütsch	Switzerland	50.24	47.58	1:37.82	Q
8	5	Žan Košir	Slovenia	48.89	48.93	1:37.82	Q
9	19	Philipp Schoch	Switzerland	47.56	50.29	1:37.85	Q
10	1	Simon Schoch	Switzerland	49.05	49.41	1:38.46	Q
11	13	Alexander Bergmann	Germany	49.07	49.42	1:38.49	Q
12	8	Nevin Galmarini	Switzerland	49.23	49.84	1:39.07	Q
13	22	Jasey Jay Anderson	Canada	49.88	49.59	1:39.47	Q
14	10	Matthew Morison	Canada	49.75	49.87	1:39.62	Q
15	4	Sylvain Dufour	France	48.57	51.19	1:39.76	Q
16	9	Andreas Prommegger	Austria	50.44	49.32	1:39.76	Q
17	29	Kim Sang-kyum	South Korea	49.48	50.79	1:40.27	
18	2	Roland Fischnaller	Italy	50.68	49.80	1:40.48	
19	28	Valery Kolegov	Russia	50.02	50.67	1:40.69	
20	23	Stefan Baumeister	Germany	51.30	49.42	1:40.72	
21	30	Izidor Šušteršič	Slovenia	50.36	50.66	1:41.02	
22	11	Anton Unterkofler	Austria	49.57	51.47	1:41.04	
23	32	Yosyf Penyak	Ukraine	49.71	51.43	1:41.14	
24	14	Justin Reiter	United States	50.90	50.35	1:41.25	
25	31	Radoslav Yankov	Bulgaria	51.46	50.62	1:42.08	
26	27	Shin Bong-shik	South Korea	53.75	49.68	1:43.43	
27	17	Michael Lambert	Canada	52.56	51.13	1:43.69	
28	24	Christoph Mick	Italy	52.83	55.42	1:48.25	
29	16	Stanislav Detkov	Russia	DSQ	48.26	DSQ	DSQ
30	12	Aaron March	Italy	DSQ	1:03.16	DSQ	DSQ
	6	Lukas Mathies	Austria	—	DSQ	DSQ	DSQ
	25	Meinhard Erlacher	Italy	DSQ	—	DSQ	DSQ

=== Elimination round ===
The 16 best racers advanced to the elimination round.

1/8 finals
16	Prommegger (AUT)
1	Sobolev (RUS)	+1.61
8	Košir (SLO)
9	P. Schoch (SUI)	+1.17
12	Galmarini (SUI)
5	Karl (AUT)	+0.10
4	Marguč (SLO)
13	Anderson (CAN)	+0.47
3	Bussler (GER)
14	Morison (CAN)	+0.30
6	Flander (SLO)
11	Bergmann (GER)	+0.34
10	S. Schoch (SUI)
7	Flütsch (SUI)	+0.22
2	Wild (RUS)
15	Dufour (FRA)	+5.65

Quarterfinals
16	Prommegger (AUT)	+0.53
8	Košir (SLO)
12	Galmarini (SUI)
4	Marguč (SLO)	+0.09
3	Bussler (GER)
6	Flander (SLO)	+0.40
10	S. Schoch (SUI)	+4.19
2	Wild (RUS)

Semifinals
8	Košir (SLO)	+1.36
12	Galmarini (SUI)
3	Bussler (GER)	+2.61
2	Wild (RUS)

Finals
12	Galmarini (SUI)	+2.14
2	Wild (RUS)
Third place
8	Košir (SLO)
3	Bussler (GER)	+2.26

=== Final standings ===
Rank	Bib	Name	Country
1st place, gold medalist(s)	7	Vic Wild	Russia
2nd place, silver medalist(s)	8	Nevin Galmarini	Switzerland
3rd place, bronze medalist(s)	5	Žan Košir	Slovenia
4	21	Patrick Bussler	Germany
5	3	Rok Marguč	Slovenia
6	20	Rok Flander	Slovenia
7	1	Simon Schoch	Switzerland
8	9	Andreas Prommegger	Austria
9	26	Andrey Sobolev	Russia
10	16	Benjamin Karl	Austria
11	18	Kaspar Flütsch	Switzerland
12	19	Philipp Schoch	Switzerland
13	13	Alexander Bergmann	Germany
14	22	Jasey Jay Anderson	Canada
15	10	Matthew Morison	Canada
16	4	Sylvain Dufour	France
17	29	Kim Sang-Kyum	South Korea
18	2	Roland Fischnaller	Italy
19	28	Valery Kolegov	Russia
20	23	Stefan Baumeister	Germany
21	30	Izidor Šušteršič	Slovenia
22	11	Anton Unterkofler	Austria
23	32	Yosyf Penyak	Ukraine
24	14	Justin Reiter	United States
25	31	Radoslav Yankov	Bulgaria
26	27	Shin Bong-Shik	South Korea
27	17	Michael Lambert	Canada
28	24	Christoph Mick	Italy
29	16	Stanislav Detkov	Russia
30	12	Aaron March	Italy
DSQ	6	Lukas Mathies	Austria
DSQ	25	Meinhard Erlacher	Italy
