= Žan Košir =

Slovenian snowboarder (born 1984)

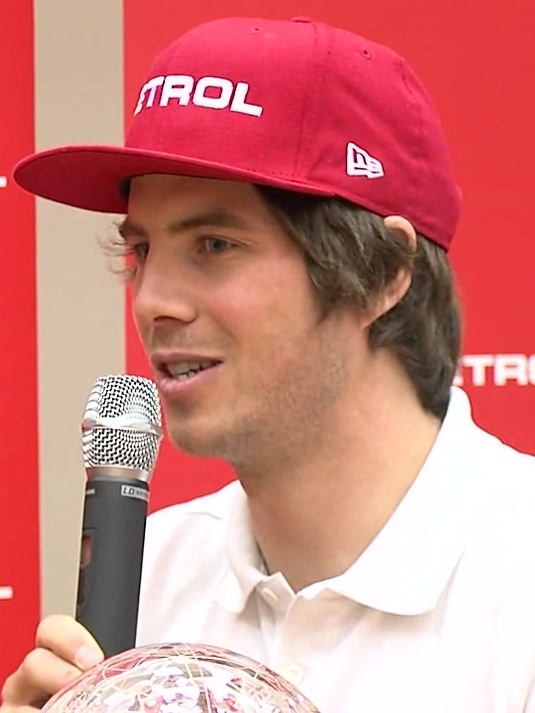
- Košir in 2015

Personal information
- Born: 11 April 1984 (age 42) Kranj, SFR Yugoslavia

Sport
- Club: KD Zakon
Medal record
Men's snowboarding
Representing Slovenia
Olympic Games
Silver medal – second place	2014 Sochi	Parallel slalom
Bronze medal – third place	2014 Sochi	Parallel giant slalom
Bronze medal – third place	2018 Pyeongchang	Parallel giant slalom
World Championships
Silver medal – second place	2015 Kreischberg	Parallel giant slalom

Žan Košir (born 11 April 1984) is a Slovenian snowboarder.

Košir represented Slovenia at the 2010 Winter Olympics where he finished 6th in parallel giant slalom. At the 2014 Winter Olympics, Košir won a bronze medal in the same discipline, beating Patrick Bussler of Germany in the bronze medal race.

== World Cup results ==
=== Season titles ===
- 3 titles – (1 parallel overall, 1 parallel giant slalom, 1 parallel slalom)

Season	Discipline
2015	Parallel Overall
2015	Parallel Giant Slalom
2015	Parallel Slalom

=== Race podiums ===
- 4 wins – (3 PSL, 1 PGS)
- 15 podiums – (8 PSL, 7 PGS)

Season	Date	Location	Discipline	Place
2008–2009	21 Dec 2008	Arosa, Switzerland	Parallel Slalom	3rd
2008–2009	7 Jan 2013	Kreischberg, Austria	Parallel Slalom	3rd
2012–2013	11 Jan 2013	Bad Gastein, Austria	Parallel Slalom	3rd
2012–2013	12 Jan 2013	Bad Gastein, Austria	Parallel Slalom	1st
2012–2013	8 Feb 2013	Rogla, Slovenia	Parallel GS	2nd
2013–2014	13 Dec 2013	Carezza, Italy	Parallel GS	2nd
2013–2014	12 Jan 2014	Bad Gastein, Austria	Parallel Slalom	2nd
2013–2014	18 Jan 2014	Rogla, Slovenia	Parallel GS	2nd
2014–2015	16 Dec 2014	Carezza, Italy	Parallel GS	2nd
2014–2015	18 Dec 2014	Montafon, Austria	Parallel Slalom	2nd
2014–2015	9 Jan 2015	Bad Gastein, Austria	Parallel Slalom	1st
2014–2015	31 Jan 2015	Rogla, Slovenia	Parallel GS	3rd
2014–2015	7 Feb 2015	Sudelfeld, Germany	Parallel GS	3rd
2014–2015	28 Feb 2015	Asahikawa, Japan	Parallel GS	1st
2014–2015	1 Mar 2015	Asahikawa, Japan	Parallel Slalom	1st

== Olympic results ==
Year	Age	Parallel Slalom	Parallel Giant Slalom
(Canada) 2010 Vancouver	25	not held	6
(Russia) 2014 Sochi	29	2	3
(South Korea) 2018 Pyeongchang	33	not held	3
(China) 2022 Beijing	37	not held	11

== World Championships results ==
Year	Age	Parallel Slalom	Parallel Giant Slalom
(Canada) 2005 Whistler	20	-	DNF
(South Korea) 2009 Gangwon	24	13	9
(Spain) 2011 La Molina	26	10	6
(Canada) 2013 Stoneham	28	31	4
(Austria) 2015 Kreischberg	30	5	2
(United States) 2019 Park City	34	10	5
(Slovenia) 2021 Rogia	37	19	21
