= Marguč =

Marguč is a Slovene-language surname. Notable people with the surname include:

- Gašper Marguč (born 1990), Slovenian handball player
- Rok Marguč (born 1986), Slovenian snowboarder
