= Anton Unterkofler =

Austrian snowboarder

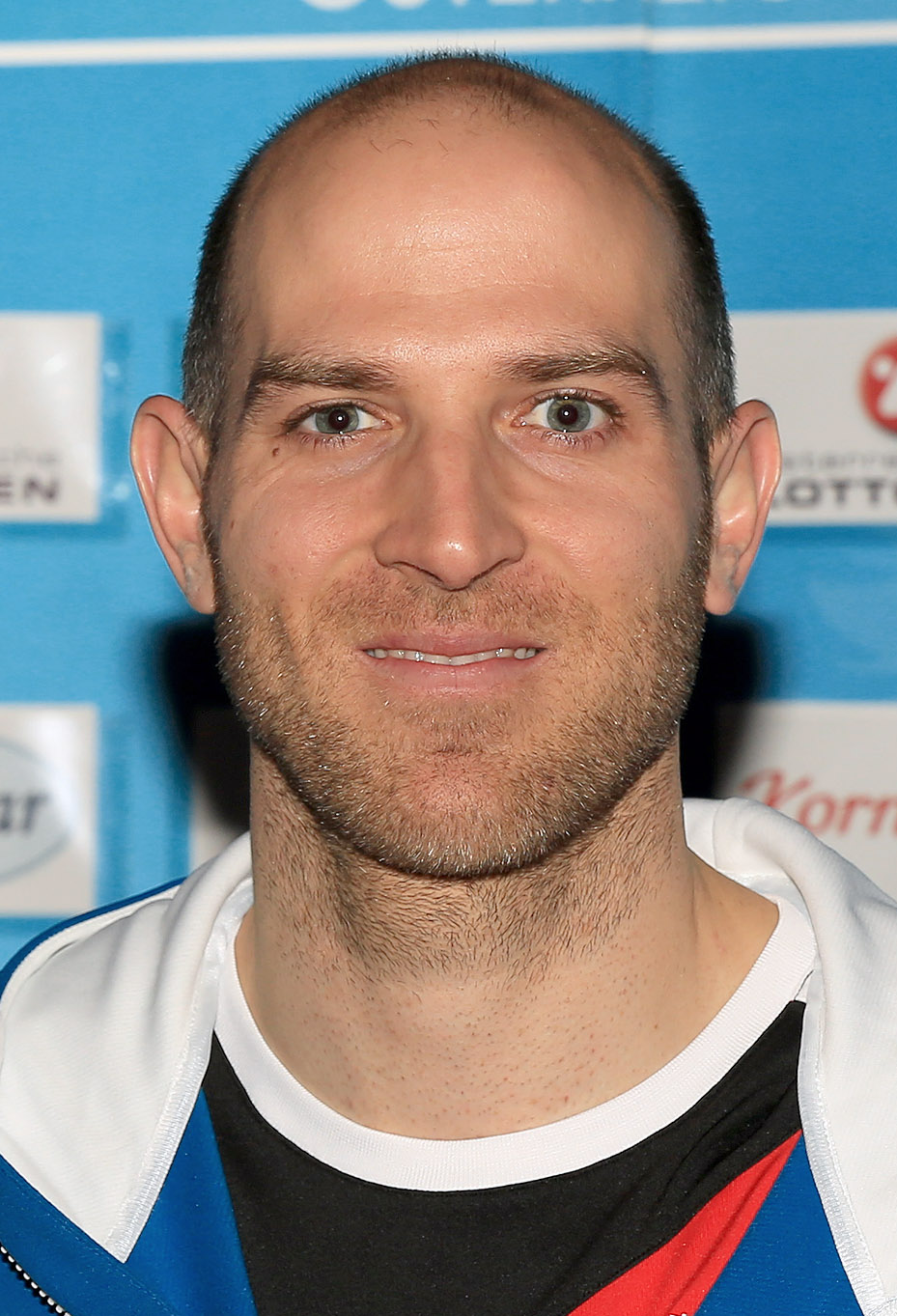

Personal information
- Born: 12 April 1983 (age 43) Schwarzach im Pongau, Austria

Sport
- Sport: Skiing

World Cup career
- Indiv. podiums: 3
- Indiv. wins: 1

Anton Unterkofler (born 12 April 1983, in Schwarzach im Pongau) is an Austrian snowboarder, specializing in Alpine snowboarding.

Unterkofler competed at the 2014 Winter Olympics for Austria. He placed 22nd in qualifying for the parallel giant slalom, and 17th in the parallel slalom, not advancing in either event.

As of September 2014, his best showing at the World Championships is 5th, in the 2011 parallel giant slalom.

Unterkofler made his World Cup debut in January 2001. As of September 2014, he has one World Cup victory, in a parallel giant slalom at Carezza in 2013–14. His best overall finish is 11th, in 2007–08.

== World Cup podiums ==
Date	Location	Rank	Event
19 January 2013	La Molina	2nd place, silver medalist(s)	Parallel giant slalom
10 March 2013	Arosa	3rd place, bronze medalist(s)	Parallel giant slalom
13 January 2013	Carezza	1st place, gold medalist(s)	Parallel giant slalom
