= Alexander Bergmann =

German snowboarder (born 1987)

Personal information
- Born: 16 May 1987 (age 39) Ravensburg, West Germany

Sport
- Sport: Skiing

World Cup career
- Indiv. podiums: 1
- Indiv. wins: 1

Alexander Bergmann (born 16 May 1987 in Ravensburg) is a German snowboarder, specializing in Alpine snowboarding.

Bergmann competed at the 2014 Winter Olympics for Germany. He placed 11th in qualifying for the parallel giant slalom. In the eight-finals, he was beaten by Slovenia's Rok Flander. In the parallel slalom, he finished 24th in qualifying, not advancing.

As of September 2014, his best showing at the World Championships is 21st, in the 2013 parallel giant slalom.

Bergmann made his World Cup debut in December 2006. As of September 2014, he has one World Cup victory, in the parallel slalom at Bad Gastein in 2013–14. His best overall finish is 11th, in 2013–14.

== World Cup podiums ==
Date	Location	Rank	Event
10 January 2014	Bad Gastein	1st place, gold medalist(s)	Parallel slalom
