= Petr Šindelář =

Czech snowboarder

Personal information
- Nationality: Czech
- Born: November 16, 1975 (age 49)

Sport
- Sport: Snowboarding

Petr Šindelář (born 16 November 1975 in Zlín) is a Czech snowboarder. He placed 28th in the men's parallel giant slalom event at the 2010 Winter Olympics.
