= Meinhard Erlacher =

Italian snowboarder

Personal information
- Born: 15 July 1982 (age 44) Brunico, Italy

Sport
- Sport: Skiing
- Club: Fiamme Oro

World Cup career
- Indiv. podiums: 2

Meinhard Erlacher (born 15 July 1982 in Brunico) is an Italian snowboarder, specializing in Alpine snowboarding.

Erlacher competed at the 2006, 2010 and 2014 Winter Olympics for Italy. In 2006, he placed 22nd in qualifying for the parallel giant slalom, not advancing. In 2010, he placed 21st in qualifying for the parallel giant slalom, again not advancing. In 2014, he finished was disqualified in qualifying for the parallel giant slalom and finished 25th in the parallel slalom, not advancing in either event.

As of September 2014, his best showing at the World Championships is 8th, in the 2005 parallel giant slalom.

Erlacher made his World Cup debut in January 2001. As of September 2014, he has two World Cup podium finishes, the first a bronze medal in a parallel slalom at Sungwoo Resort in 2004-05. His best overall finish is 14th, in 2004–05 and 2009–10.

== World Cup podiums ==
| Date | Location | Rank | Event |
| 25 February 2005 | Sungwoo Restort | 3rd place, bronze medalist(s) | Parallel slalom |
| 6 January 2009 | Kreischberg | 3rd place, bronze medalist(s) | Parallel giant slalom |
