= Sylvain Dufour =

French alpine snowboarder

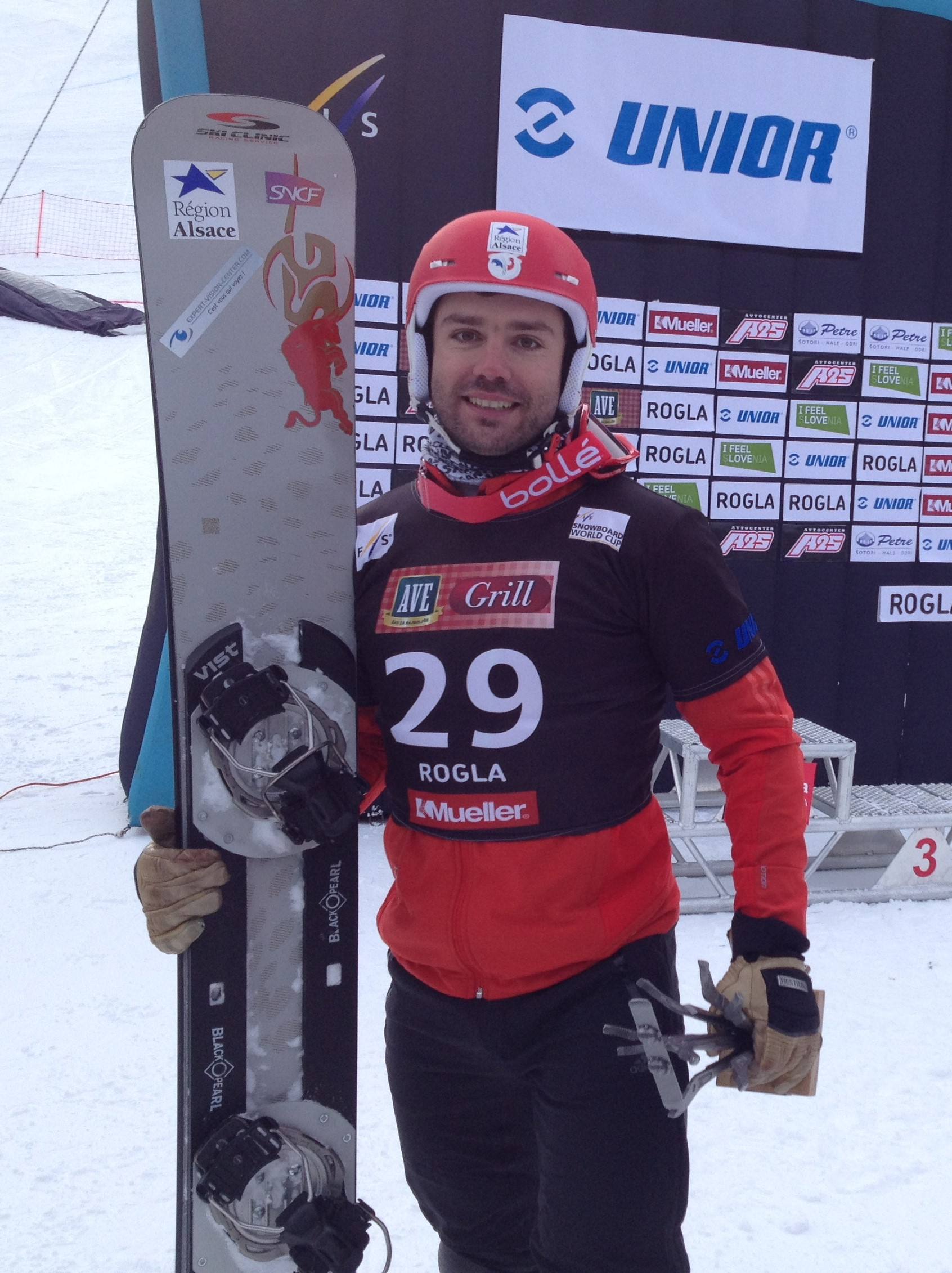

Personal information
- Full name: Sylvain Dufour
- Nickname: Popeye
- Nationality: France
- Born: 19 November 1982 (age 43) Saint-Dié-des-Vosges, France
- Height: 1.78 m (5 ft 10 in)
- Weight: 82 kg (181 lb)

Sport
- Sport: Snowboarding
- Event: Alpine
- Club: SC Sainte-Marie-aux-Mines
- Coached by: Christophe Guinamard
Medal record
Men's snowboarding
Representing France
World Championships
Silver medal – second place	2009 Gangwon	Giant slalom
Silver medal – second place	2009 Gangwon	Slalom

Sylvain Dufour (born 19 November 1982 in Saint-Dié-des-Vosges) is a French alpine snowboarder. He claimed two silver medals each in giant slalom and slalom at the 2009 FIS Snowboarding World Championships in Gangwon, South Korea, and later represented his nation France in two editions of the Olympic Games (2010 and 2014). Dufour currently trains for Ski Club Sainte-Marie-aux-Mines under his personal coach and mentor Christophe Guinamard.

Dufour reached international headlines to his sporting career, when he first won two silver medals each behind Canada's Jasey-Jay Anderson in the men's giant slalom and Austria's Benjamin Karl in the men's slalom at the 2009 FIS Snowboarding World Championships, earning him a ticket for the French team to the 2010 Winter Olympics in Vancouver.

In his official Olympic debut, Dufour recorded a second-fastest time of 1:16.79 in the seeding round of the men's giant slalom, but shortened his chances of adding another career medal after finishing behind Slovenia's Rok Flander in a first knockout round by 1.65 seconds.

At the 2014 Winter Olympics in Sochi, Dufour qualified as a lone French athlete for two alpine snowboarding events (including the first ever men's parallel slalom) by finishing first from the FIS World Cup series in Carezza, Italy and in Sudelfeld, Germany. In the men's giant slalom, Dufour could not endure his surprising setback from Vancouver after delivering a fifteenth-fastest total time of 1:39.76 in the seeding run and eventually, finishing beyond a five-second margin behind US-born Russian snowboarder Vic Wild in the first round. Three days later, in the men's slalom, Dufour grabbed a tenth-seeded time of 59.43 to compete against Switzerland's Nevin Galmarini, who won the silver in giant slalom earlier, in the first round, but he was later disqualified after missing a gate each in both blue and red course races.

Dufour competed in the Parallel giant slalom with Nathalie Desmares as a partner in 2018.
