= Christoph Mick =

Italian snowboarder

Personal information
- Born: 2 August 1988 (age 37) Bolzano, Italy

Sport
- Sport: Skiing

Christoph Mick (born 2 August 1988 in Bolzano) is an Italian snowboarder, specializing in Alpine snowboarding.

Mick competed at the 2014 Winter Olympics for Italy. He placed 28th in qualifying for the parallel giant slalom and 20th in the parallel slalom, not advancing in either event.

As of September 2014, his best showing at the World Championships is 14th, in the 2011 parallel giant slalom.

Mick made his World Cup debut in January 2006. As of September 2014, his best finish is 6th, in a parallel slalom at Carezza in 2013–14. His best overall finish is 29th, in 2010–11 and 2011–12.
