= Kaspar Flütsch =

Swiss snowboarder

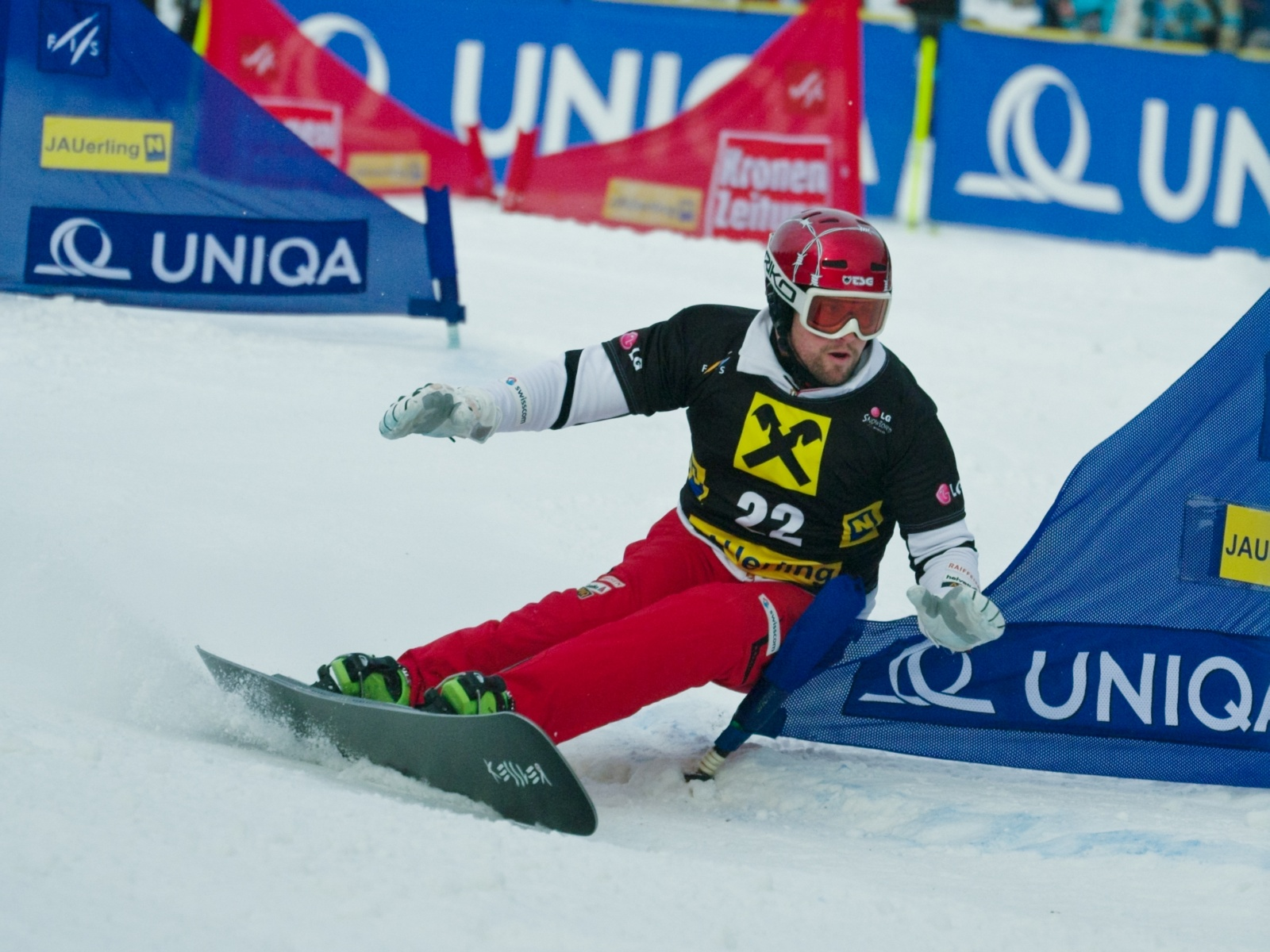

Personal information
- Full name: Kaspar Flütsch
- Nationality: Switzerland
- Born: 20 June 1986 (age 40) Luzein, Switzerland
- Height: 1.72 m (5 ft 8 in)
- Weight: 80 kg (176 lb)

Sport
- Sport: Snowboarding
- Event: Alpine
- Club: SC Pany
- Coached by: Franco Giovanoli

Kaspar Flütsch (born 20 June 1986 in Luzein) is a Swiss alpine snowboarder. He represented his nation Switzerland at the 2014 Winter Olympics, and has achieved numerous top ten finishes in alpine snowboarding at the FIS World Cup series. Since his illustrious sporting career began at eleven, Flütsch continues to train for Panys Ski Club under his personal coach Franco Giovanoli.

Flütsch qualified for two alpine snowboarding events (including the first ever men's parallel slalom) at the 2014 Winter Olympics in Sochi by achieving a fourth-place finish from the FIS World Cup series in Sudelfeld, Germany. In the men's giant slalom, Flütsch delivered a seventh-seeded time of 1:37.82 to grab a spot for the knockout rounds, where he eventually lost to his teammate and former Olympic champion Simon Schoch by 22-hundredths of a second. Three days later, in the men's slalom, Flütsch failed to advance further for the next races after finishing behind Italy's Roland Fischnaller in the first round by a 0.11-second deficit.
