= Simon Schoch =

Swiss snowboarder

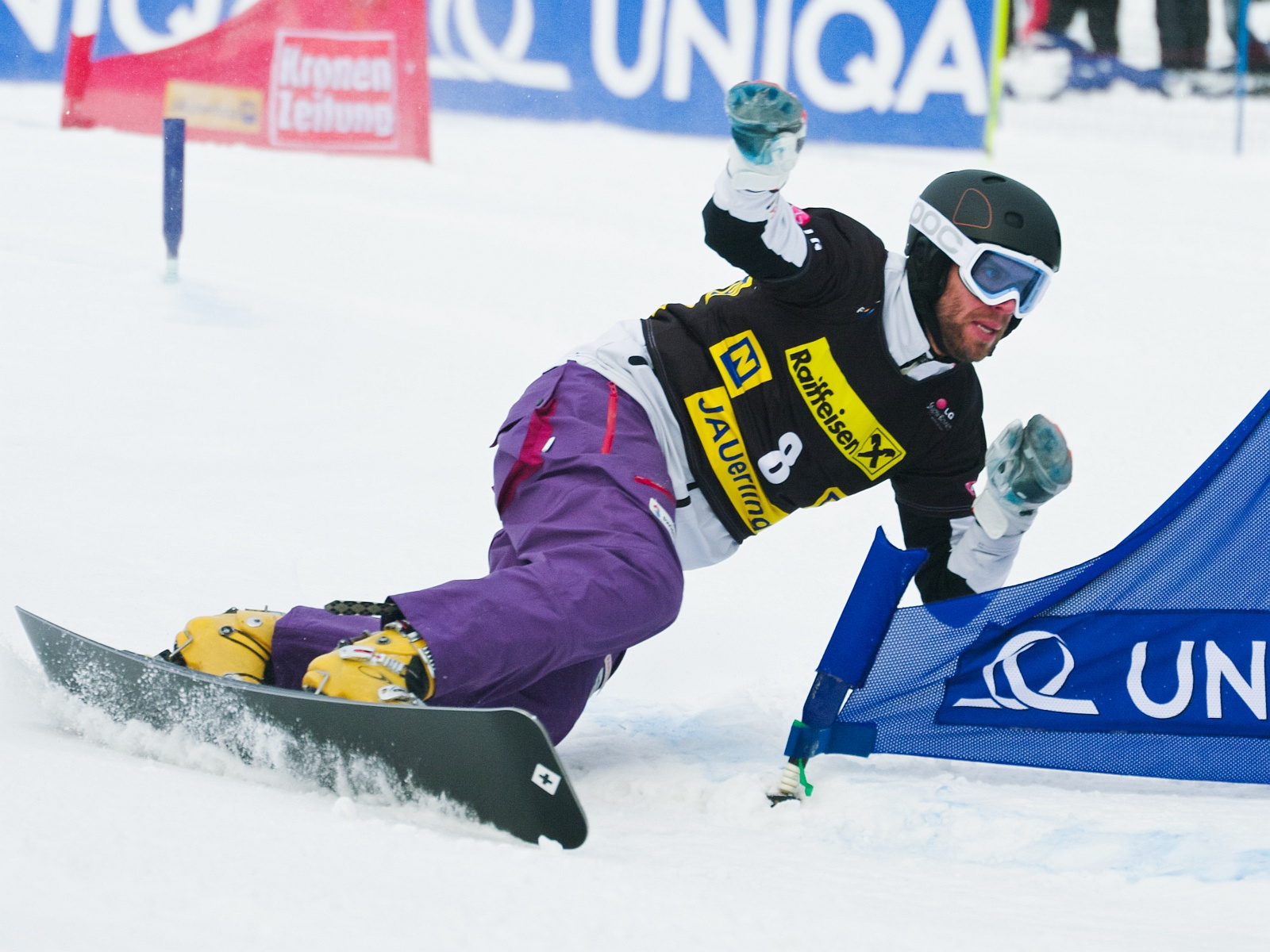

Medal record

Men's snowboarding

Representing Switzerland

Olympic Games
| Silver medal – second place | 2006 Turin | Men's Parallel Giant Slalom |

FIS Snowboarding World Championships
| Gold medal – first place | 2007 Arosa | Parallel Slalom |
| Silver medal – second place | 2003 Kreischberg | Parallel Giant Slalom |
| Silver medal – second place | 2011 La Molina | Parallel Slalom |
| Bronze medal – third place | 2003 Kreischberg | Parallel Slalom |

Simon Schoch (born 7 October 1978) is a Swiss snowboarder. At the 2003 World Championships, Schoch won Silver in Parallel Giant Slalom and Bronze in Parallel Slalom. At the 2006 Winter Olympics, he faced his brother Philipp Schoch – the reigning Olympic champion – in the Parallel Giant Slalom Final. He gave away a 0.88 second deficit in the first run and was unable to make it up in the second leg, ending up with a silver medal.
