= Shin Bong-shik =

South Korean snowboarder (born 1992)

Personal information
- Born: May 31, 1992 (age 34) Ansan, South Korea

Sport
- Sport: Skiing

- Shin Bong-shik
- Hangul: 신봉식
- RR: Sin Bongsik
- MR: Sin Pongsik

Shin Bong-shik (born May 31, 1992 in Ansan) is a South Korean snowboarder, specializing in Alpine snowboarding.

Shin competed at the 2014 Winter Olympics for South Korea. He placed 26th in qualifying for the parallel giant slalom and 23rd parallel slalom, not advancing in either event.

As of September 2014, his best showing at the World Championships is 29th, in the 2011 parallel giant slalom.

Shin made his World Cup debut in October 2009. As of September 2014, his best finish is 10th, in a parallel slalom at Bad Gastein in 2013–14. His best overall finish is 34th, in 2013–14.

His sister Shin Da-hye is also a snowboarder.

== Education ==
- Korea University
- Gunpo Suri High School
