= Aaron March =

Italian snowboarder (born 1986)

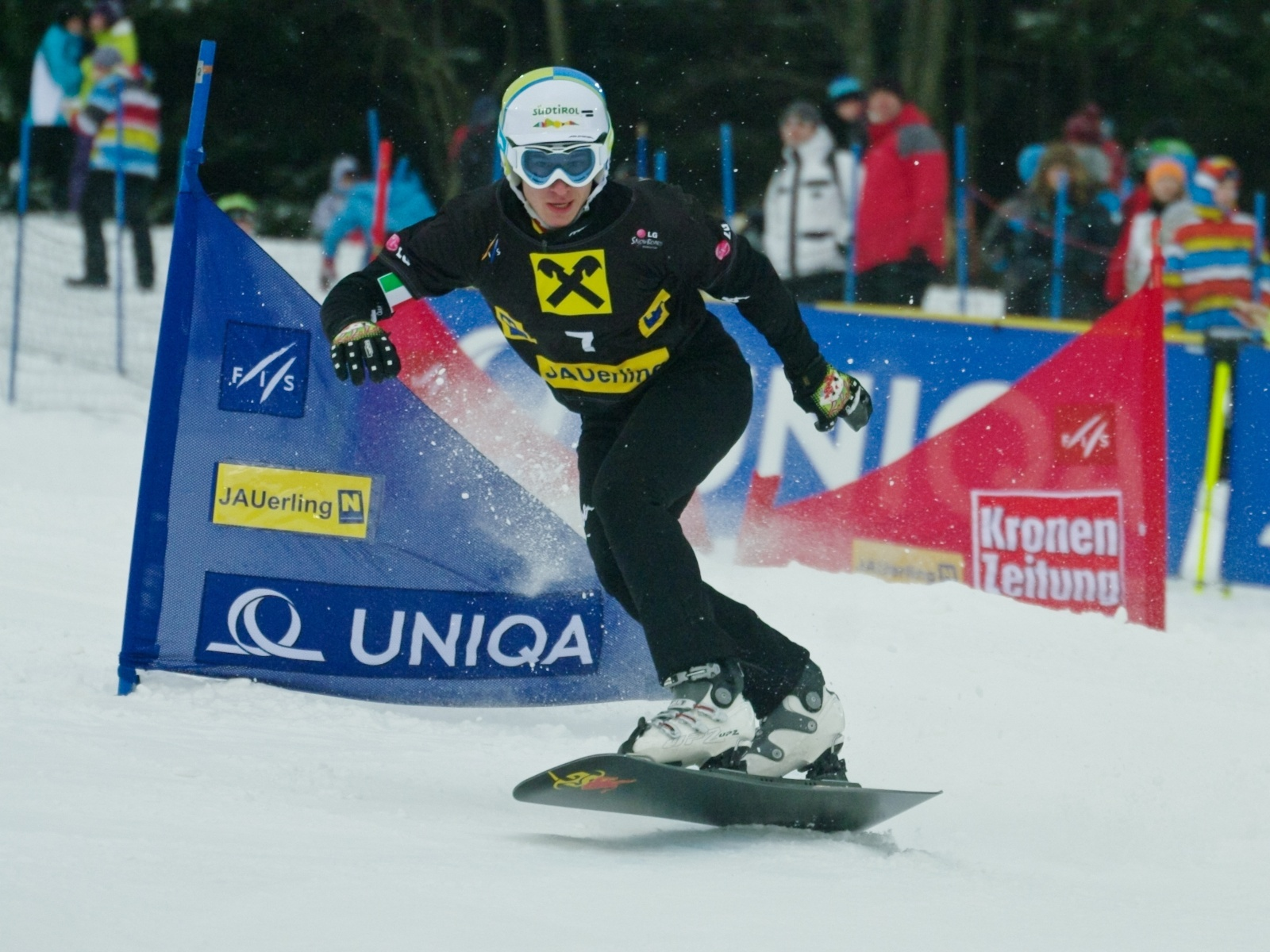
- March in 2012

Personal information
- Nickname: The Painter
- Nationality: Italian
- Born: 14 May 1986 (age 40) Brixen, Italy
- Height: 1.86 m (6 ft 1 in)
- Weight: 77 kg (170 lb)

Sport
- Sport: Snowboarding
- Event: Alpine
- Club: Centro Sportivo Esercito
- Coached by: Erich Pramsohler
Medal record
Men's snowboarding
Representing Italy
World Championships
Gold medal – first place	2023 Bakuriani	Mixed parallel slalom
Bronze medal – third place	2025 Engadin	Parallel slalom
Winter Universiade
Silver medal – second place	2013 Trentino	Giant slalom

Aaron March (born 14 May 1986) is an Italian alpine snowboarder. He represented his nation Italy in two editions of the Olympic Games (2010 and 2014), and eventually claimed a silver medal in parallel giant slalom at the 2013 Winter Universiade in the Trentino and top ten finishes at the FIS World Cup series since his sporting debut in 2001.

== Career ==
March nicknamed himself "The Painter" because of his love and passion for art and creativity; thus, he relates it to his respective sport, "When I ride, I ride with imagination. Life can be rational, but in the snow, I can create and enjoy a new world. I love the pop art of US artist Andy Warhol, its genius and recklessness. He was an innovative artist who has broken the mould, as we have done with winter sports." Being a military soldier with the rank of a corporal, March also trains at Centro Sportivo Esercito under his personal coach and mentor Erich Pramsohler.

March made his official debut as part of the Italian squad at the 2010 Winter Olympics in Vancouver, where he finished fifteenth in the men's giant slalom, losing out to Austria's Benjamin Karl in a first knockout round by 2.27 seconds.

When his nation, Italy, hosted the 2013 Winter Universiade in Trentino, March won a silver medal for his team, but he was defeated by Austria's Sebastian Kislinger in the final.

At the 2014 Winter Olympics in Sochi, March qualified for two alpine snowboarding events (including the first ever men's parallel slalom) by finishing third from the FIS World Cup series in Bad Gastein, Austria. As part of his preparations for the Olympics, March, together with his coach Erich Pramsohler and fellow snowboarders Roland Fischnaller and Austrian Siegfried Grabner, cycled a 3,100-kilometre stretch from Villnöß, Italy, and passed through eight countries on their sixteen-day voyage to Sochi, Russia. In the men's giant slalom, March was disqualified from the tournament after missing a gate on his second seeding run. Three days later, in the men's slalom, March redeemed himself with a fourth-place finish in the small final race, but could not beat his former rival Benjamin Karl for the bronze medal by a wide 16-second margin.
