= FIS Snowboarding World Championships 2013 =

International snowboarding competition

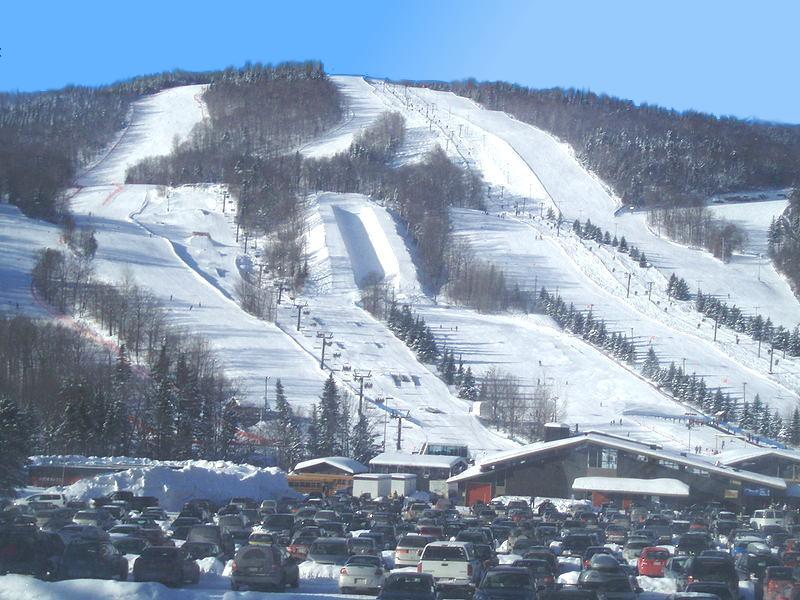

The FIS Snowboarding World Championships 2013 were held between January 18 and January 27, 2013, at Stoneham Mountain Resort in Stoneham-et-Tewkesbury, Quebec.

== Results ==
=== Men's events ===
Event	Gold		Silver		Bronze	
Big air	Roope Tonteri; Finland	188.50	Niklas Mattsson; Sweden	177.75	Seppe Smits; Belgium	149.50
Halfpipe	Iouri Podladtchikov; Switzerland	94.25	Taku Hiraoka; Japan	93.25	Markus Malin; Finland	86.75
Slopestyle	Roope Tonteri; Finland	93.75	Mark McMorris; Canada	92.50	Janne Korpi; Finland	90.75
Snowboard cross	Alex Pullin; Australia		Markus Schairer; Austria		Stian Sivertzen; Norway	
Parallel giant slalom	Benjamin Karl; Austria		Roland Fischnaller; Italy		Vic Wild; Russia	
Parallel slalom	Rok Marguč; Slovenia		Justin Reiter; United States		Roland Fischnaller; Italy	

=== Women's events ===
Event	Gold		Silver		Bronze	
Halfpipe	Arielle Gold; United States	79.00	Holly Crawford; Australia	77.25	Sophie Rodriguez; France	72.50
Slopestyle	Spencer O'Brien; Canada	93.25	Sina Candrian; Switzerland	81.50	Torah Bright; Australia	77.50
Snowboard cross	Maelle Ricker; Canada		Dominique Maltais; Canada		Helene Olafsen; Norway	
Parallel giant slalom	Isabella Laböck; Germany		Julia Dujmovits; Austria		Amelie Kober; Germany	
Parallel slalom	Ekaterina Tudegesheva; Russia		Patrizia Kummer; Switzerland		Amelie Kober; Germany	

== Medal table ==
Rank	Nation	Gold	Silver	Bronze	Total
1	Canada (CAN)	2	2	0	4
2	Finland (FIN)	2	0	2	4
3	Austria (AUT)	1	2	0	3
3	Switzerland (SUI)	1	2	0	3
5	Australia (AUS)	1	1	1	3
6	United States (USA)	1	1	0	2
7	Germany (GER)	1	0	2	3
8	Russia (RUS)	1	0	1	2
9	Slovenia (SLO)	1	0	0	1
10	Italy (ITA)	0	1	1	2
11	Japan (JPN)	0	1	0	1
11	Sweden (SWE)	0	1	0	1
13	Norway (NOR)	0	0	2	2
14	Belgium (BEL)	0	0	1	1
14	France (FRA)	0	0	1	1
Totals (15 entries)		11	11	11	33
