= Rok Marguč =

Slovenian snowboarder (born 1986)

Personal information
- Born: 25 May 1986 (age 40) Celje, Slovenia
- Height: 180 cm (5 ft 11 in)
- Weight: 82 kg (181 lb)
Medal record
Men's snowboarding
Representing Slovenia
World Championships
Gold medal – first place	2013 Stoneham	Parallel slalom
Silver medal – second place	2011 La Molina	Parallel GS
Bronze medal – third place	2011 La Molina	Parallel slalom
Bronze medal – third place	2015 Kreischberg	Parallel slalom

Rok Marguč (born 25 May 1986 in Celje) is a Slovenian snowboarder who competed at the 2010 Winter Olympics, finishing 23rd in the Parallel Giant Slalom event.

Marguc won two medals at the 2011 FIS Snowboarding World Championships: a silver in Parallel Giant Slalom, and a bronze in Parallel Slalom.

Two years later, at the 2013 FIS Snowboarding World Championships, he captured gold in the parallel slalom.

== World Cup ==
=== Podiums ===
Podiums
Season	Date	Location	Place
2006–07	16 February 2007	Furano, Japan	3rd
2007–08	8 January 2008	Bad Gastein, Austria	3rd
2010–11	5 March 2011	Moscow, Russia	2nd
2012–13	10 March 2013	Arosa, Italy	1st
2015–16	30 January 2015	Moscow, Russia	3rd
2015–16	27 February 2016	Kayseri, Turkey	2nd

Olympic Games
Preceded by Vesna Fabjan	Flagbearer for Slovenia; Beijing 2022	Succeeded by Nika Prevc and Domen Prevc
