= Andrey Sobolev =

Russian snowboarder

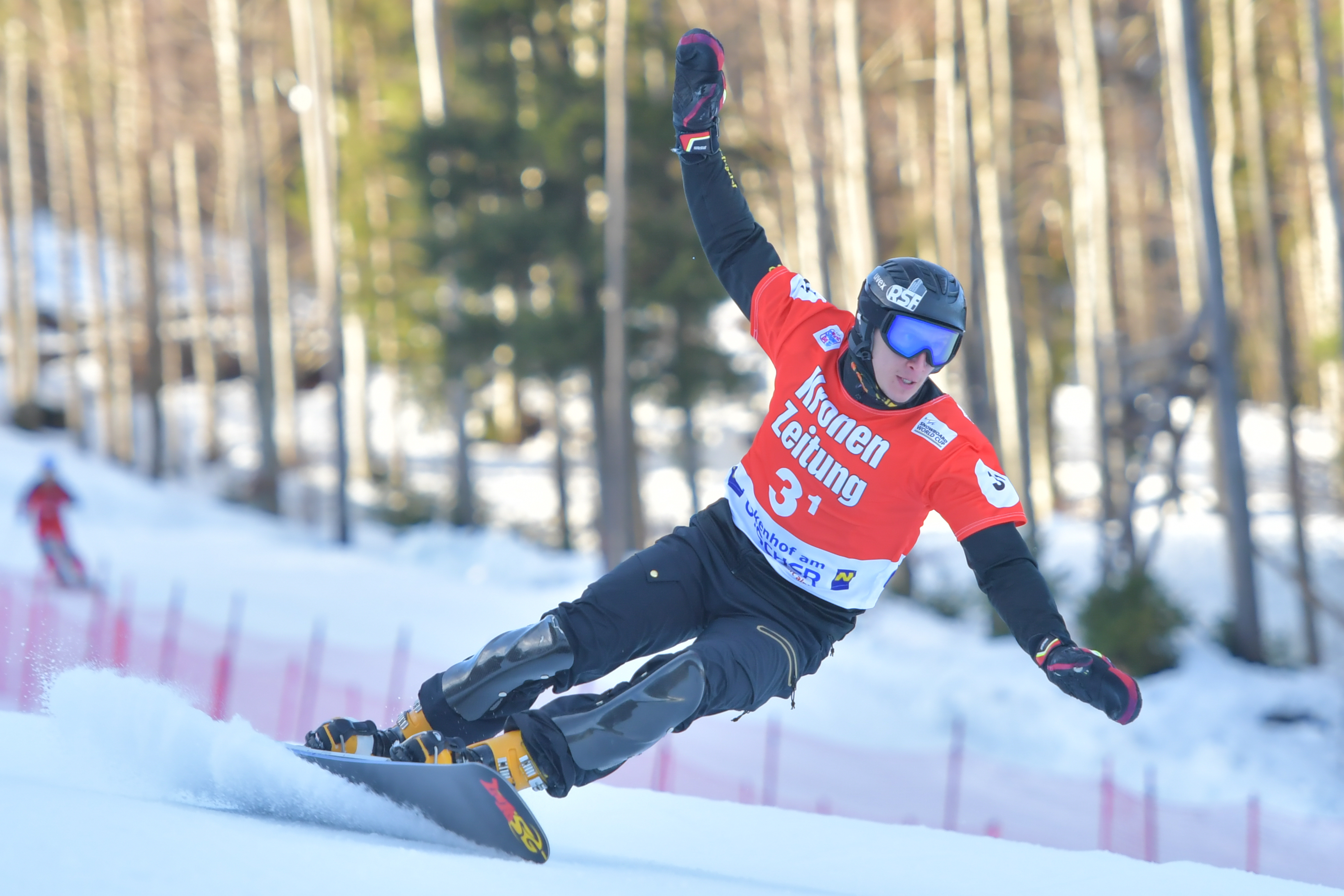
- Andrey Sobolev, FIS Snowboard World Cup in 2018

Personal information
- Full name: Andrey Andreyevich Sobolev
- Nationality: Russia
- Born: 27 November 1989 Tashtagol, Russian SSR, Soviet Union (now Russia)
- Height: 1.84 m (6 ft 0 in)

Sport
- Sport: Skiing

World Cup career
- Indiv. podiums: 14
- Indiv. wins: 7
- Discipline titles: 2
Medal record
Men's Snowboarding
Representing Russia
World Championships
Gold medal – first place	2015 Kreischberg	Parallel giant slalom
Silver medal – second place	2015 Kreischberg	Parallel slalom
Bronze medal – third place	2017 Sierra Nevada	Parallel slalom
Junior World Championships
Silver medal – second place	2009 Nagano	Parallel slalom
Representing Russian Ski Federation
World Championships
Bronze medal – third place	2021 Rogla	Parallel GS

Andrey Andreyevich Sobolev (Russian: Андрей Андреевич Соболев; born 27 November 1989) is a Russian snowboarder, specializing in Alpine snowboarding and formerly specializing in snowboard cross. He is the brother of Olympic snowboarder Natalia Soboleva, who is the silver medalist of the 2019 World Championships.

== Career ==
Sobolev competed at the 2014 Winter Olympics for Russia. He was the top qualifier in the parallel giant slalom, but in the 1/8 finals, he lost to Austria's Andreas Prommegger, finishing 9th overall. He then failed to qualify for the elimination round in the parallel slalom, finishing 27th.

As of September 2014, his best showing at the World Championships is 14th, in the 2013 parallel slalom.

Sobolev made his World Cup debut in February 2007. As of September 2014, he has one podium finish, silver in parallel slalom at Jauerling in 2011–12. His best overall finish is 15th, in 2013–14.

== World Cup podiums ==
=== Individual podiums ===
- 7 wins – (2 PS, 5 PGS)
- 15 podiums – (3 PS, 12 PGS)

Season	Date	Location	Discipline	Place
2012–13	13 January 2012	Jauerling, Austria	Parallel Slalom	2nd
2014–15	7 February 2014	Sudelfeld, Germany	Parallel GS	1st
2015–16	12 December 2014	Carezza, Italy	Parallel GS	2nd
2015–16	23 January 2016	Rogla, Slovenia	Parallel GS	1st
2016–17	15 December 2016	Carezza, Italy	Parallel GS	2nd
2016–17	17 December 2016	Cortina d'Ampezzo, Italy	Parallel Slalom	1st
2017–18	14 December 2017	Carezza, Italy	Parallel GS	1st
2018–19	26 January 2019	Moscow, Russia	Parallel Slalom	1st
2018–19	23 February 2019	Secret Garden, China	Parallel GS	2nd
2018–19	9 March 2019	Scuol, Switzerland	Parallel GS	1st
2019–20	11 January 2020	Scuol, Switzerland	Parallel GS	1st
2019–20	22 February 2020	Pyeongchang, South Korea	Parallel GS	3rd
2019–20	29 February 2020	Blue Mountain, Canada	Parallel GS	3rd
2020–21	6 March 2021	Rogla, Slovenia	Parallel GS	2nd
2021–22	11 December 2021	Lake Bannoye, Russia	Parallel GS	3rd

=== Team podiums ===
- 1 podium – (1 PSL_{M})

Season	Date	Location	Discipline	Place	Teammate(s)
2018–19	27 January 2019	Moscow, Russia	Parallel Slalom Team	2nd	Natalia Soboleva

=== Season titles ===
- 2 titles – (1 overall, 1 parallel giant slalom)

Season	Discipline
2016	Parallel Giant Slalom
2019	Parallel Overall
