= Kim Sang-kyum =

South Korean snowboarder (born 1989)

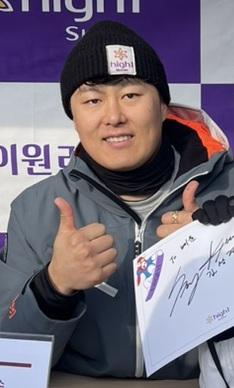
- Kim in 2023

Personal information
- Born: January 30, 1989 (age 37) Cheorwon, South Korea

Sport
- Sport: Skiing
Medal record
Men's snowboarding
Representing South Korea
Olympic Games
Silver medal – second place	2026 Milano Cortina	Parallel giant slalom
Asian Winter Games
Bronze medal – third place	2017 Sapporo	Slalom
Winter Universiade
Gold medal – first place	2011 Erzurum	Parallel giant slalom

- Kim Sang-kyum
- Hangul: 김상겸
- Hanja: 金相謙
- RR: Gim Sanggyeom
- MR: Kim Sanggyŏm

Kim Sang-kyum (born January 30, 1989, in Cheorwon) is a South Korean snowboarder, specializing in Alpine snowboarding.

== Career ==
Kim competed at the 2014 Winter Olympics for South Korea. He placed 17th in qualifying for the parallel giant slalom and 26th parallel slalom, 2018 Pyeongchang Olympic PGS 15th, 2022 beijing Olympic 24th. He is a 3 times Olympians

As of September 2014, his best showing at the World Championships is 23rd, in the 2013 parallel giant slalom.

Kim made his World Cup debut in October 2009. As of September 2014, his best finish is 21st in parallel slalom at Yongpyong in 2010–11. His best overall finish was 46th, in 2010–11.

== Education ==
- 2011 Korea National Sport University
- 2007 Bongpyung High School
