= Yosyf Penyak =

Ukrainian snowboarder

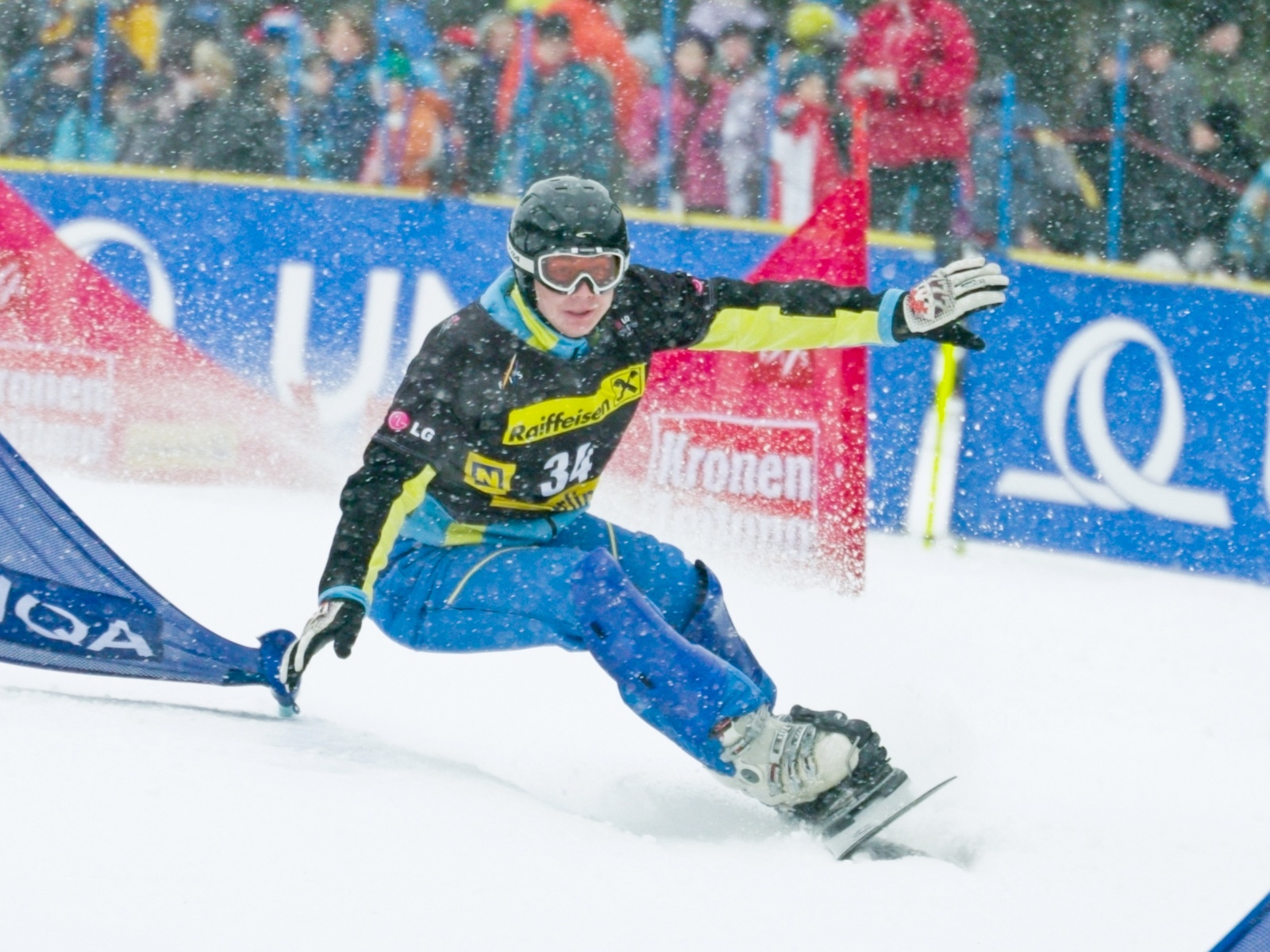

Personal information
- Born: 31 May 1984 (age 42) Uzhhorod, Ukrainian SSR, Soviet Union

Sport
- Sport: Skiing
- Club: Spartak

World Cup career
- Seasons: 2004–
- Updated on 4 February 2014

Yosyf Penyak (Ukrainian: Йосиф Пеняк; born 31 May 1984, in Uzhhorod) is a Ukrainian snowboarder, specializing in parallel slalom. He represented Ukraine at the 2010 Winter Olympics in Vancouver and 2014 Winter Olympics in Sochi.

Penyak made his World Cup debut in October 2004. As of February 2014, he has the best result 8th in parallel slalom in 2008/09 at Kreischberg.

== Performances ==
Level	Year	Event	PS	PGS	SC
SWCH	2003	Kreischberg, Austria	59	49	47
JSWCH	2004	Klinovec, Czech Republic; Oberwiesenthal, Germany		23	DNF
SWCH	2007	Arosa, Switzerland	40	35	50
SWCH	2009	Gangwon, South Korea	DSQ	29	
OLY	2010	Vancouver, Canada		22	
SWCH	2011	La Molina, Spain	17	21	
SWCH	2013	Stoneham-et-Tewkesbury, Canada	21	34	

=== World Cup ===
==== Positions ====
Season	PS	PGS	PAR
2004–05			77
2005–06			58
2006–07			54
2007–08			44
2008–09			35
2009–10			42
2010–11			32
2011–12			46
2012–13	25	44	33
2013–14	35	37	40
