= Roland Fischnaller (snowboarder) =

Italian snowboarder (born 1980)

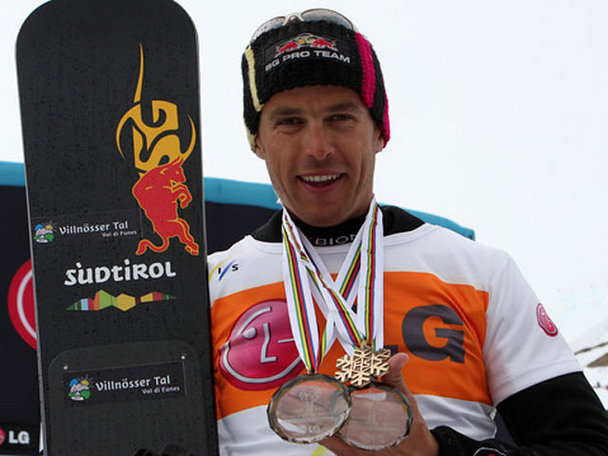
- Fischnaller in 2007

Personal information
- Nationality: Italian
- Born: 19 September 1980 (age 46) Brixen, Italy
- Height: 1.86 m (6 ft 1 in)
- Weight: 83 kg (183 lb)

Sport
- Country: Italy
- Sport: Snowboarding
- Event: Parallel slalom
- Club: CS Esercito
Medal record
Men's snowboarding
Representing Italy
World Championships
Gold medal – first place	2015 Kreischberg	Parallel slalom
Gold medal – first place	2025 Engadin	Parallel giant slalom
Silver medal – second place	2013 Stoneham	Parallel GS
Silver medal – second place	2019 Utah	Parallel slalom
Silver medal – second place	2021 Rogla	Parallel GS
Bronze medal – third place	2011 La Molina	Parallel GS
Bronze medal – third place	2013 Stoneham	Parallel slalom

Roland Fischnaller (born 19 September 1980) is an Italian snowboarder who is a seven-time Olympian, having competed in the 2002, 2006, 2010, 2014, 2018, 2022, and 2026 Winter Olympics in men's parallel giant slalom, as well as the men's parallel slalom in 2014.
