= Vic Wild =

American-born Russian snowboarder

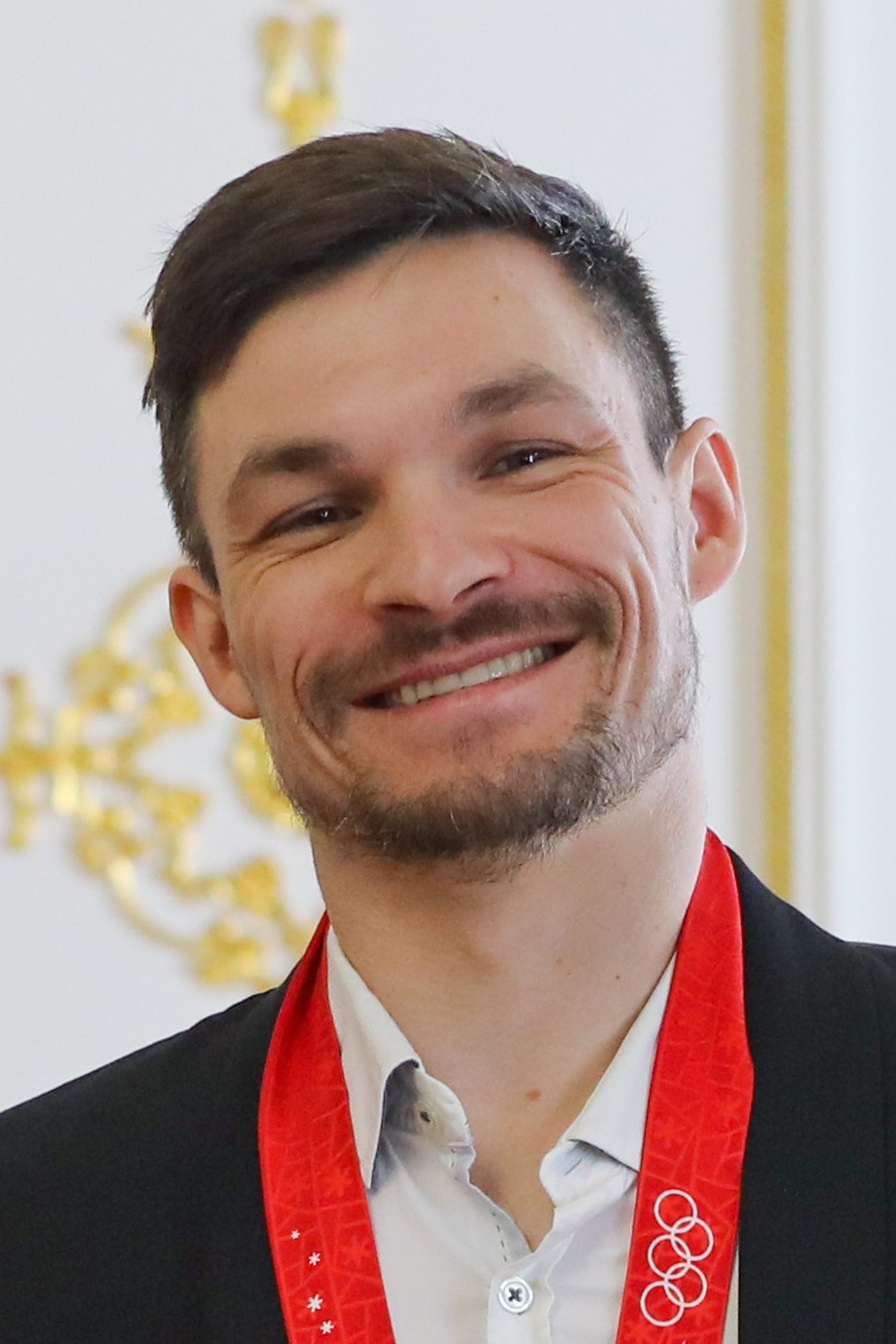
- Wild in 2022

Personal information
- Full name: Victor Ivan Wild
- Citizenship: Russia
- Born: August 23, 1986 (age 39) White Salmon, Washington, U.S.
- Height: 5 ft 10 in (178 cm)
- Weight: 175 lb (79 kg)

Sport
- Country: Russia
- Sport: Snowboarding
Medal record
Men's snowboarding
Representing Russia
Olympic Games
Gold medal – first place	2014 Sochi	Parallel Slalom
Gold medal – first place	2014 Sochi	Parallel Giant Slalom
FIS Snowboarding World Championships
Bronze medal – third place	2013 Stoneham	Parallel Giant Slalom
Representing ROC
Olympic Games
Bronze medal – third place	2022 Beijing	Parallel Giant Slalom

Victor Ivan Wild (Russian: Виктор Айван Уайлд; born August 23, 1986) is an American-born Russian snowboarder.

== Career ==
Wild won a bronze medal in the parallel giant slalom at the 2013 FIS Snowboarding World Championships and gold medals in the parallel slalom and parallel giant slalom at the 2014 Winter Olympics in Sochi, which made him the first snowboarder ever to win two medals at the same Winter Games. At the 2022 Winter Olympics in Beijing, he won a bronze medal in parallel giant.

Wild originally competed for the United States, but after the 2010 Winter Olympics, the United States Ski and Snowboard Association shut down its alpine snowboarding program. According to a 2014 story by Jeff Passan of Yahoo! Sports, Wild had been viewed by US snowboarding officials "as an enfant terrible, someone who didn't understand alpine's place in the [USA] snowboarding power structure. Halfpipe is king, with slopestyle creeping up in importance, and snowboardcross racing third." One of Wild's former coaches indicated that before its closure, the alpine snowboarding program had a budget of $135,000, a fraction of the funding needed for an internationally competitive team. This is mainly caused by the fact that the United States remains the only country in the world not to fund its Olympic Committee, which is why available funding is limited.

Wild opted to leave the country after he married Russian snowboarder Alena Zavarzina in 2011. He then applied for Russian citizenship. After winning gold for Russia at the Sochi Olympics, Wild commented, "Russia is a country that made it possible for me to win. Had I stayed in the US, I'd probably be still sitting at home, doing some ordinary job, doing something banal and not interesting. I always wanted something different … It is just amazing that I won this gold for Russia. Some may think, 'This guy still stays American.' … And that is not true! I am not some American guy who decided it would be easier to get to Olympics in a country where snowboarding is undeveloped. I have chosen the harder path to success, and I have walked it all the way."

Wild received more than $400,000 in bonuses from the Russian government for winning two gold medals at the 2014 Sochi Games. He was also presented with a brand-new SUV. Unlike the United States, where the Olympic Committee is a non-governmental structure, the Russian government not only funds the Olympic Committee and athletes but also rewards them with cash for winning medals.

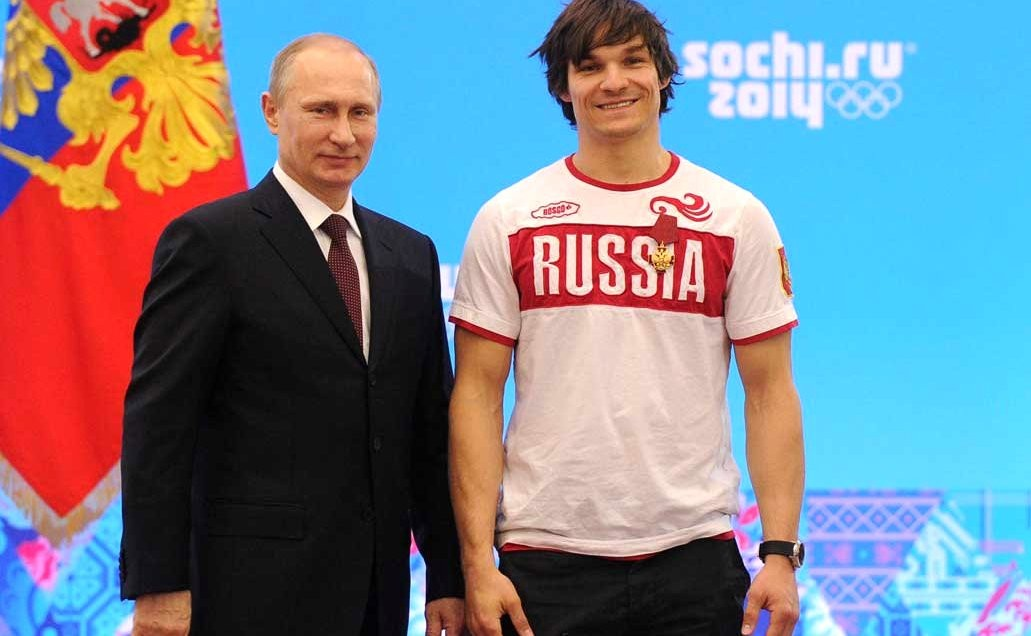
Vladimir Putin and Wild in 2014

Wild received the Order For Merit to the Fatherland Award 4th class with Russian President Vladimir Putin handing the state awards.
