= Jasey-Jay Anderson =

Canadian snowboarder (born 1975)

Jasey Jay Anderson
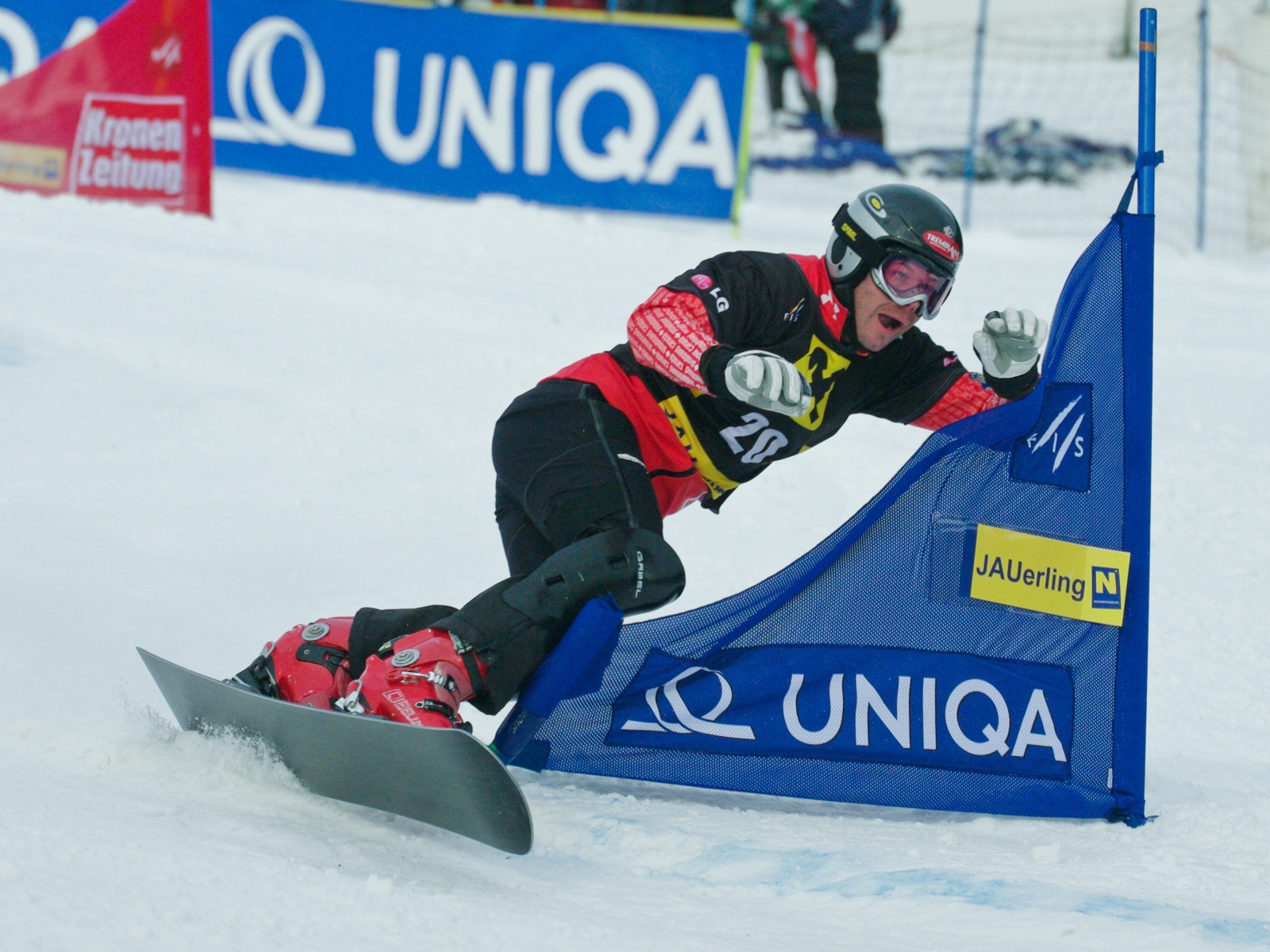
- Anderson in 2012

Personal information
- Born: 13 April 1975 (age 51) Val-Morin, Quebec, Canada
- Height: 5 ft 10 in (178 cm)
- Weight: 175 lb (79 kg)
- Website: jaseyjay.com
Medal record
Men's snowboarding
Representing Canada
Olympic Games
Gold medal – first place	2010 Vancouver	Parallel GS
World Championships
Gold medal – first place	2001 Madonna di Campiglio	Giant slalom
Gold medal – first place	2005 Whistler	Parallel slalom
Gold medal – first place	2005 Whistler	Parallel GS
Gold medal – first place	2009 Gangwon	Parallel GS

Jasey-Jay Anderson (born 13 April 1975) is a Canadian snowboarder and Olympic gold medallist, who competed in the 1998, 2002, 2006, 2010, 2014, and 2018 Winter Olympics. Anderson currently resides in Mont-Tremblant outside of Montreal.

== Personal life ==
Anderson was born in Val-Morin, Quebec. Out of season, he lives on a blueberry farm in Mont-Tremblant, Quebec. Since 2007, Jasey-Jay is part of the Tremblant athletes ambassadors program.

== Sports career ==
Anderson is Canada's most decorated snowboarder having achieved a World Championship gold medal in all 3 slalom events over his career, and an Olympic gold medal in parallel giant slalom. In addition to being a 4 time world champion Anderson has achieved success across the snowboard. Anderson won four consecutive overall FIS Snowboard World Cup titles from 2000 to 2004 and two world cup overall titles in snowboard cross in 2001–02 and 2005–06. These titles included 20 podiums in parallel giant slalom and 19 podiums in snowboard cross.

Anderson is also a six-time Olympic athlete, having represented Canada in the 1998 Nagano, 2002 Salt Lake, 2006 Turin, 2010 Vancouver, 2014 Sochi, 2018 PyeongChang, Winter Olympic games.

Anderson's best result in the Olympics prior to Vancouver 2010 was a 5th-place finish in snowboard cross in Turin. Anderson finished 20th in the parallel giant slalom event at the 2006 Turin games.

Anderson won the gold medal in men's parallel giant slalom at the 2010 Winter Olympics on home soil as the games took place in Vancouver, British Columbia, Canada.

Anderson retired following the Vancouver 2010 Olympics but returned to snowboarding to compete in the Sochi 2014 Olympics, where he was the oldest competitor and ultimately finished in fourteenth position.

In January 2018, at age 42, he became the oldest snowboarder to compete at a World Cup. Anderson qualified for the PyeongChang Olympics. With his participation at the 2018 Winter Olympics, he became the oldest competitor in snowboarding, and the Canadian with the most appearances at the Winter Olympics, becoming a 6-time Winter Olympian.
