= Rok Flander =

Slovenian snowboarder (born 1979)

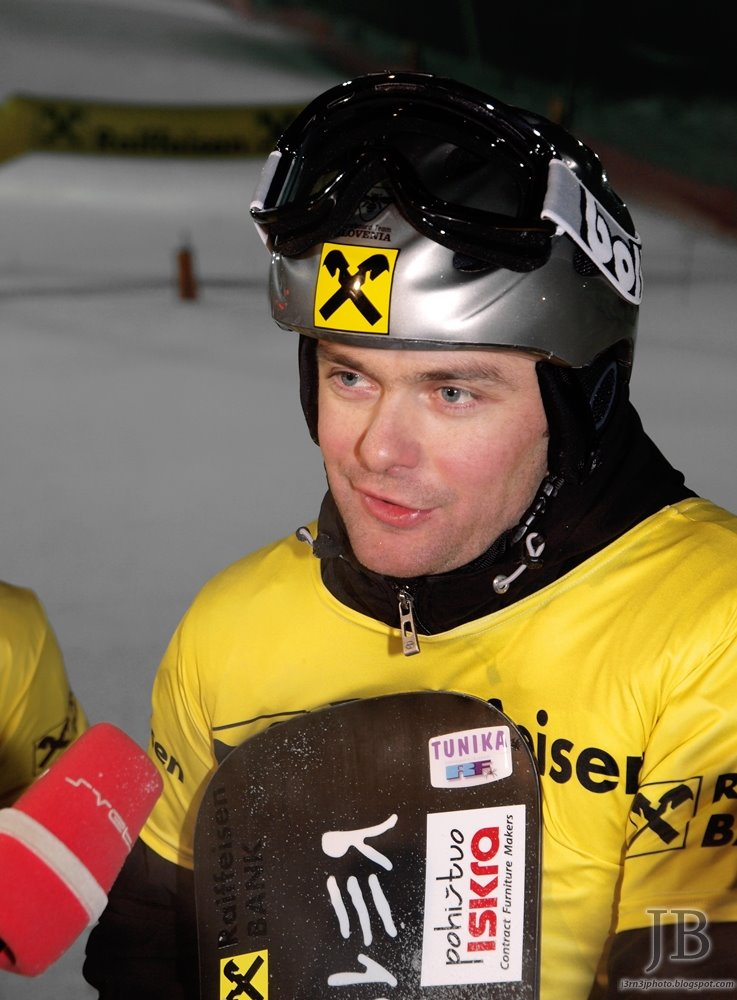
- Flander in 2009

Medal record

Men's snowboarding

Representing Slovenia

FIS Snowboarding World Championships
Gold medal – first place	2007 Arosa	Parallel GS
Bronze medal – third place	2007 Arosa	Parallel Slalom

Rok Flander (born 26 June 1979 in Kranj) is a Slovenian snowboarder.

Flander is currently 3rd in the overall standings of the 2006-07 Snowboarding World Cup, having won a race in Kronplatz and finishing second in Sölden. He finished 7th in the Parallel Giant Slalom at the 2006 Winter Olympics, 8th at the 2010 Winter Olympics, and 6th at the 2014 Winter Olympics.

On 16 January 2007, he became world champion in the Parallel Giant Slalom in Arosa, Switzerland. A day later, he also won bronze in Parallel Slalom.

== World Cup ==
=== Podiums ===
Season	Date	Location	Place
2006–2007	22 Oct 2006	Sölden, Austria	2nd
2006–2007	13 Dec 2006	Mareo, Italy	1st
2006–2007	9 Feb 2007	Shukolovo, Russia	3rd
2007–2008	20 Oct 2007	Soelden, Austria	1st
2007–2008	16 Dec 2007	Nendaz, Switzerland	2nd
2007–2008	20 Jan 2008	La Molina, Spain	1st
2008–2009	7 Jan 2009	Kreischberg, Austria	2nd
2009–2010	17 Dec 2009	Telluride, United States	3rd
2009–2010	13 Mar 2010	Valmalenco, Italy	2nd
2010–2011	16 Dec 2010	Telluride, United States	1st
2011–2012	21 Dec 2011	Carezza, Italy	3rd
2011–2012	15 Jan 2012	Bad Gastein, Austria	3rd
2012–2013	14 Feb 2013	(Russia) Sochi, Rusia	3rd
