= Nevin Galmarini =

Swiss snowboarder

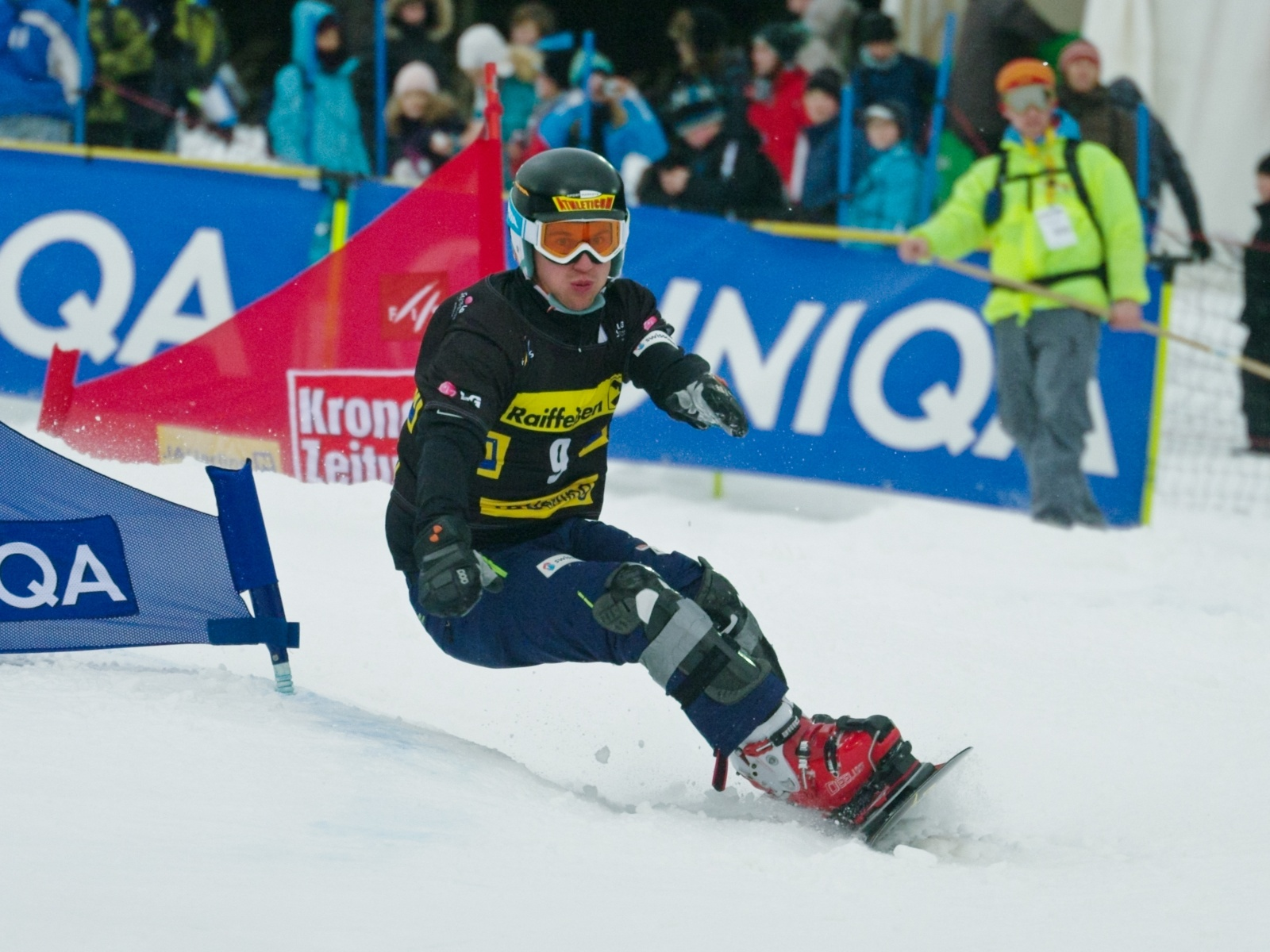
- Galmarini in 2012

Personal information
- Born: 4 December 1986 (age 39) St. Gallen, Switzerland
- Height: 1.72 m (5 ft 8 in)
Medal record
Men's snowboarding
Representing Switzerland
Olympic Games
Gold medal – first place	2018 Pyeongchang	Parallel giant slalom
Silver medal – second place	2014 Sochi	Parallel giant slalom
- Updated on 24 February 2018

Nevin Galmarini (born 4 December 1986) is a Swiss snowboarder and Olympic Champion. In February 2018, Nevin Galmarini won a gold medal at the Winter Olympics in Pyeongchang, South Korea in the Parallel giant slalom. In 2009, he won the Swiss nationalships and became the Swiss champion in parallel giant slalom. He competed in the parallel giant slalom for Switzerland during the 2010 Winter Olympic games in Vancouver, British Columbia, Canada and in the 2014 Winter Olympic games in Sochi, Russia where he won the silver medal. He currently resides in Ardez, Switzerland.

== 2009/2010 Season highlights ==
- Top ten classification in the World Cup list
- Swiss national champion in alpine Snowboarding
- Selection for the FIS Snowboarding World Championships
- Bronze medalist in PGS at the Nor-Am Cup in Copper Mountain (Colorado)
- Competing PGS in the 2010 Winter Olympics

== Career highlights ==
- Fourth in PGS at the 2010 World Cup, in Sudelfeld, Germany
- Seventh in PGS at the 2009 World Cup, in Kreischberg, Germany.
- Silver and Bronze medalist at the 2009 Europa Cup, in Nova Levante-Carezza, Italy
- Bronze medalist at the 2009 Nor-Am Cup 2009 in Copper Mountain (Colorado)
- Gold medalist at the 2018 Winter Olympics in Pyeongchang, South Korea
