= Radoslav Yankov =

Bulgarian snowboarder (born 1990)

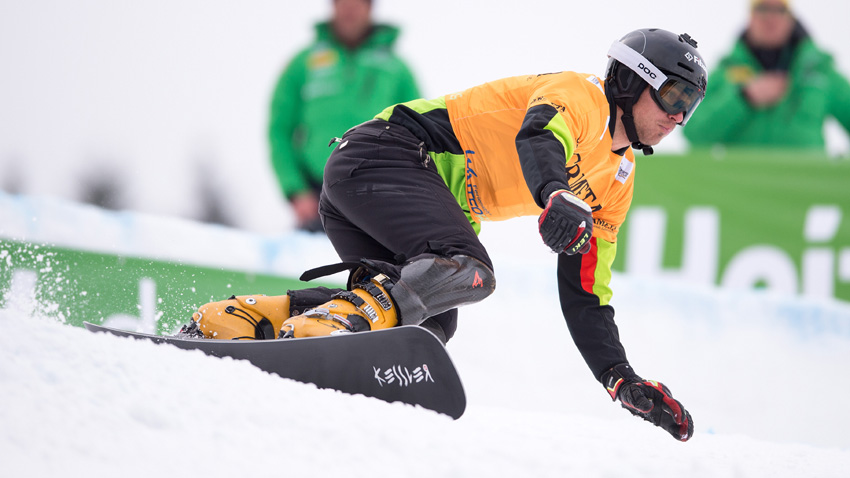
- 2018

Personal information
- Full name: Radoslav Dimitrov Yankov
- Born: 26 January 1990 (age 36) Smolyan, Bulgaria
- Height: 190 cm (6 ft 3 in)
- Weight: 85 kg (187 lb)

Radoslav Dimitrov Yankov (Bulgarian: Радослав Димитров Янков; born 26 January 1990) is a snowboarder from Bulgaria. He competed for Bulgaria at the 2014 Winter Olympics in the alpine snowboarding events (parallel and giant slalom).

Yankov's first World Cup win came at the Men's Parallel Giant Slalom (PGS) event held in Carezza on December 12, 2015.

During the 2016–17 season he made great results in PGS, winning the overall title at the end of the season.

== World Cup ==
=== Podiums ===
Season	Date	Location	Event	Place
2015–16	12 Dec 2015	Carezza, Italy	PGS	1st
2015–16	8 Jan 2016	Bad Gastein, Austria	PSL	1st
2015–16	23 Jan 2016	Rogla, Slovenia	PGS	2nd
2016–17	15 Dec 2016	Carezza, Italy	PGS	3rd
2016–17	28 Jan 2017	Rogla, Slovenia	PGS	2nd
2016–17	3 Feb 2017	Bansko, Bulgaria	PGS	1st
2016–17	5 Feb 2017	Bansko, Bulgaria	PGS	2nd
2017–18	21 Jan 2018	Rogla, Slovenia	PGS	2nd
2023–24	20 Jan 2024	Pamporovo, Bulgaria	PSL	3rd
2024–25	12 Dec 2024	Carezza, Italy	PGS	1st
2024–25	19 Jan 2025	Bansko, Bulgaria	PGS	3rd
2024–25	16 Feb 2025	Saint-Côme, Canada	PGS	3rd
2025–26	18 Jan 2026	Bansko, Bulgaria	PGS	3rd

=== Season titles ===
- 1 title – (1 overall)

Season	Discipline
2015–16	Overall
2016–17	PGS

=== Season standings ===
Season	Age	Overall	Parallel giant slalom	Parallel slalom
2015–16	26	1	2	3
2016–17	27	2	1	15
2017–18	28	6	8	6
2018–19	29	21	29	9
2019–20	30	13	11	15
2020–21	31	31	28	27
2021–22	32	20	27	17
2022–23	33	16	20	12
2023–24	34	10	20	6

Standings through January 21, 2024

== Olympics performance ==
Event	Parallel slalom	Parallel giant slalom
(Russia) 2014 Sochi	21st	25th
(South Korea) 2018 Pyeongchang	N/A	19th
(China) 2022 Beijing	N/A	15th
(Italy) 2026 Milano Cortina	N/A	13th

Olympic Games
Preceded by Maria Kirkova	Flagbearer for Bulgaria; 2018 Pyeongchang	Succeeded by Incumbent
