= Patrick Bussler =

German snowboarder (born 1984)

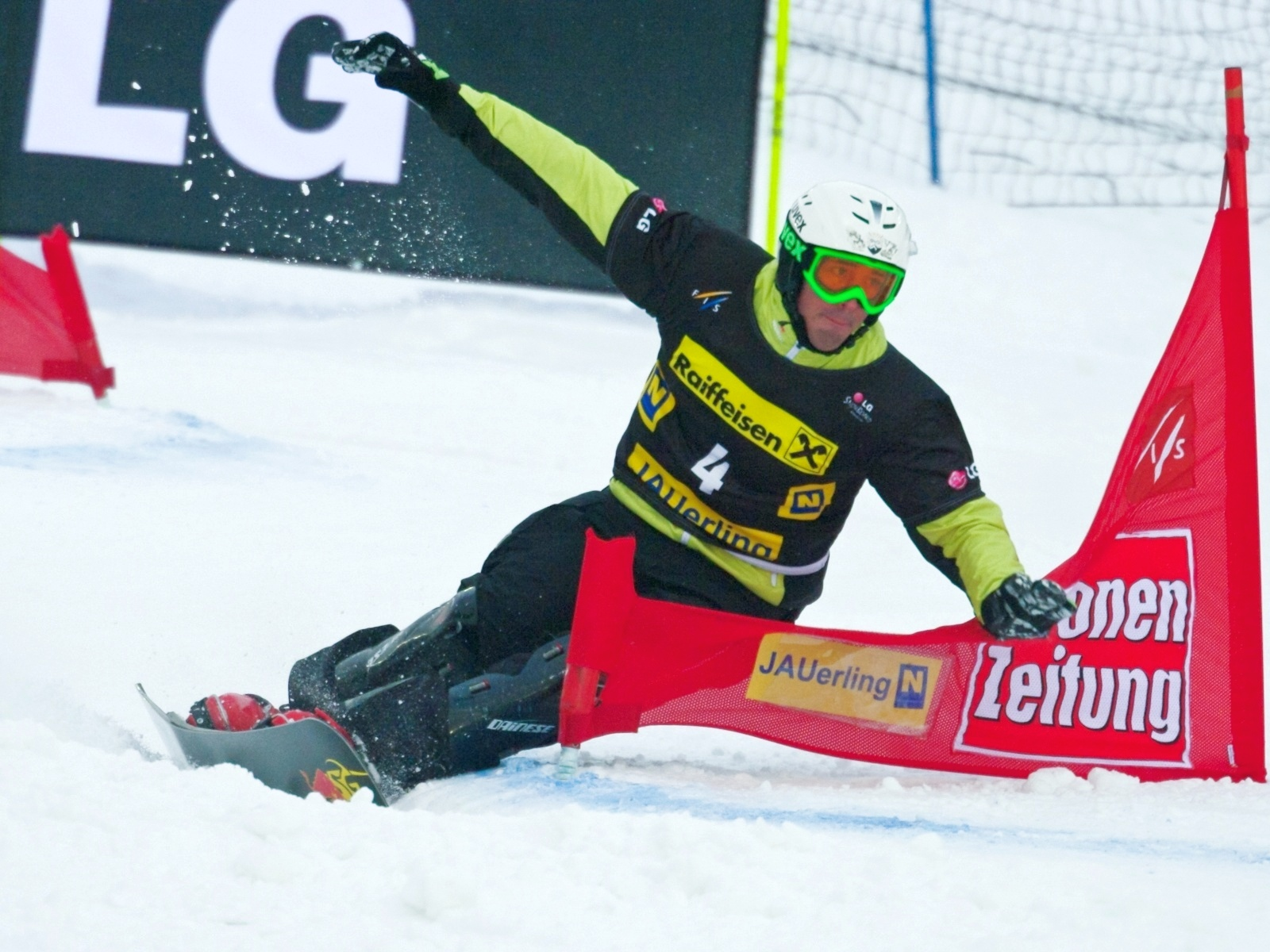

Medal record

Men's snowboarding

Representing Germany

World Championships
Bronze medal – third place	2009 Gangwon	Parallel Slalom

Patrick Bussler (born 1 June 1984 in Munich) is a German snowboarder. He competed for Germany at the 2006 Winter Olympics in Men's parallel giant slalom. He was later selected to compete for Germany at the 2010 Winter Olympics.
