= FIS Freestyle Ski and Snowboarding World Championships 2019 – Women's parallel slalom =

Women's parallel slalom at the FIS Freestyle Ski and Snowboarding World Championships 2019
- Venue: Park City Mountain Resort
- Location: Utah, United States
- Dates: February 5
- Competitors: 40 from 17 nations

Medalists
gold medal	Julie Zogg	Switzerland
silver medal	Annamari Dancha	Ukraine
bronze medal	Ramona Theresia Hofmeister	Germany

The Women's parallel slalom competition at the FIS Freestyle Ski and Snowboarding World Championships 2019 WAS held on February 5, 2019.

== Qualification ==
The qualification was started at 09:00. After the first run, the top 32 snowboarders were allowed a second run on the opposite course.

Rank	Bib	Name	Country	Blue course	Red course	Total	Notes
1	2	Selina Jörg	Germany	40.22	44.90	1:25.12	Q
2	13	Cheyenne Loch	Germany	44.03	41.70	1:25.73	Q
3	14	Ramona Theresia Hofmeister	Germany	41.83	44.62	1:26.45	Q
4	6	Julie Zogg	Switzerland	41.68	44.88	1:26.56	Q
5	1	Patrizia Kummer	Switzerland	45.47	41.18	1:26.65	Q
6	10	Sabine Schöffmann	Austria	42.62	44.15	1:26.77	Q
7	4	Aleksandra Król	Poland	41.28	45.54	1:26.82	Q
8	16	Maria Valova	Russia	43.01	44.58	1:27.59	Q
9	15	Daniela Ulbing	Austria	44.73	43.00	1:27.73	Q
10	12	Milena Bykova	Russia	42.58	45.26	1:27.84	Q
11	8	Nadya Ochner	Italy	41.70	46.55	1:28.25	Q
12	3	Ladina Jenny	Switzerland	45.41	43.14	1:28.55	Q
13	11	Natalia Soboleva	Russia	45.81	42.80	1:28.61	Q
14	24	Nicole Baumgartner	Switzerland	42.49	46.98	1:29.47	Q
15	23	Annamari Dancha	Ukraine	46.46	43.23	1:29.69	Q
16	26	Zang Ruxin	China	45.05	45.60	1:30.65	Q
17	17	Carolin Langenhorst	Germany	47.68	43.00	1:30.68	
18	19	Gong Naiying	China	47.15	43.59	1:30.74	
19	20	Jemima Juritz	Austria	42.61	48.50	1:31.11	
20	22	Emi Sato	Japan	44.58	46.99	1:31.57	
21	7	Michelle Dekker	Netherlands	43.65	48.52	1:32.17	
22	30	Kaylie Buck	Canada	45.81	46.82	1:32.63	
23	27	Megan Farrell	Canada	49.25	44.07	1:33.32	
24	9	Claudia Riegler	Austria	48.18	45.82	1:34.00	
25	28	Maggie Carrigan	Ireland	46.33	48.29	1:34.62	
26	37	Xu Xiaoxiao	China	49.32	45.44	1:34.76	
27	31	Millie Bongiorno	Australia	48.15	47.12	1:35.27	
28	21	Elizaveta Salikhova	Russia	57.76	43.65	1:41.41	
29	38	Kaiya Kizuka	United States	48.09	56.79	1:44.88	
—	25	Weronika Biela	Poland	DNF	45.35		
—	5	Glorija Kotnik	Slovenia	DSQ	42.75		
—	32	Jennifer Hawkrigg	Canada	47.65	DSQ		
33	36	Abby Champagne	United States	48.63			
34	35	Oleksandra Malovanna	Ukraine		49.14		
35	33	Lynn Ott	United States		50.09		
36	39	Dita Žďárská	Czech Republic		51.08		
37	29	Kan Binbin	China		51.84		
38	18	Jeong Hae-rim	South Korea	52.68			
39	40	Alexa Bullis	United States	53.20			
—	34	Katrina Greencser	Canada	DSQ			

== Elimination round ==
The 16 best racers advanced to the elimination round.

1/8 finals
4	(Switzerland) Zogg
13	(Russia) Soboleva	+1.36
5	(Switzerland) Kummer
12	(Switzerland) Jenny	DSQ
8	(Russia) Valova
9	(Austria) Ulbing	+1.14
1	(Germany) Jörg
16	(China) Zang	+1.67
2	(Germany) Loch	+4.14
15	(Ukraine) Dancha
7	(Poland) Król
10	(Russia) Bykova	+0.95
6	(Austria) Schöffmann
11	(Italy) Ochner	+1.68
3	(Germany) Hofmeister
14	(Switzerland) Baumgartner	+0.62

Quarterfinals
4	(Switzerland) Zogg
5	(Switzerland) Kummer	+0.47
8	(Russia) Valova
1	(Germany) Jörg	+12.72
15	(Ukraine) Dancha
7	(Poland) Król	+2.23
6	(Austria) Schöffmann	+0.39
3	(Germany) Hofmeister

Semifinals
4	(Switzerland) Zogg
8	(Russia) Valova	+11.15
15	(Ukraine) Dancha
3	(Germany) Hofmeister	+1.19

Finals
4	(Switzerland) Zogg
15	(Ukraine) Dancha	+0:85
Third place
8	(Russia) Valova	+0.90
3	(Germany) Hofmeister
