= FIS Freestyle Ski and Snowboarding World Championships 2019 – Women's parallel giant slalom =

Women's parallel giant slalom at the FIS Freestyle Ski and Snowboarding World Championships 2019
- Venue: Park City Mountain Resort
- Location: Utah, United States
- Dates: February 4
- Competitors: 40 from 17 nations

Medalists
gold medal	Selina Jörg	Germany
silver medal	Natalia Soboleva	Russia
bronze medal	Ladina Jenny	Switzerland

The Women's parallel giant slalom competition at the FIS Freestyle Ski and Snowboarding World Championships 2019 was held on February 4, 2019.

== Qualification ==
The qualification was started at 09:00. After the first run, the top 32 snowboarders were allowed a second run on the opposite course.

Rank	Bib	Name	Country	Blue course	Red course	Total	Notes
1	10	Selina Jörg	Germany	39.43	41.85	1:21.28	Q
2	6	Patrizia Kummer	Switzerland	40.69	42.99	1:23.68	Q
3	9	Natalia Soboleva	Russia	42.93	40.83	1:23.76	Q
4	1	Ladina Jenny	Switzerland	42.77	41.07	1:23.84	Q
5	14	Maria Valova	Russia	41.38	42.76	1:24.14	Q
6	23	Annamari Dancha	Ukraine	42.85	41.36	1:24.21	Q
7	2	Ramona Theresia Hofmeister	Germany	41.27	43.05	1:24.32	Q
8	17	Carolin Langenhorst	Germany	42.63	41.71	1:24.34	Q
9	21	Elizaveta Salikhova	Russia	42.34	42.31	1:24.65	Q
10	5	Sabine Schöffmann	Austria	42.81	41.90	1:24.71	Q
11	12	Michelle Dekker	Netherlands	42.13	42.60	1:24.73	Q
12	26	Zang Ruxin	China	42.36	42.82	1:25.18	Q
13	13	Aleksandra Król	Poland	43.28	42.11	1:25.39	Q
14	4	Nadya Ochner	Italy	42.09	43.37	1:25.46	Q
15	8	Milena Bykova	Russia	40.20	45.38	1:25.58	Q
16	18	Jeong Hae-rim	South Korea	41.72	44.18	1:25.90	Q
17	20	Jemima Juritz	Austria	43.05	43.08	1:26.13	
18	11	Julie Zogg	Switzerland	43.42	42.86	1:26.28	
19	37	Xu Xiaoxiao	China	44.29	42.50	1:26.79	
20	27	Megan Farrell	Canada	44.55	44.42	1:28.97	
21	3	Cheyenne Loch	Germany	46.39	43.95	1:30.34	
22	34	Katrina Greencser	Canada	45.47	45.81	1:31.28	
23	29	Kan Binbin	China	45.87	47.44	1:33.31	
24	39	Dita Žďárská	Czech Republic	47.61	46.42	1:34.03	
25	36	Abby Champagne	United States	49.26	47.10	1:36.36	
26	7	Glorija Kotnik	Slovenia	56.71	40.52	1:37.23	
27	32	Jennifer Hawkrigg	Canada	54.92	45.53	1:40.45	
28	35	Oleksandra Malovanna	Ukraine	56.33	45.25	1:41.58	
29	31	Millie Bongiorno	Australia	58.59	45.47	1:44.06	
30	30	Kaylie Buck	Canada	45.64	1:02.12	1:47.76	
31	40	Alexa Bullis	United States	52.06	56.79	1:48.85	
32	16	Daniela Ulbing	Austria	45.47	DSQ		
33	15	Claudia Riegler	Austria		47.61		
34	19	Gong Naiying	China		50.09		
35	33	Lynn Ott	United States		56.76		
36	38	Kaiya Kizuka	United States	1:03.60			
—	28	Maggie Carrigan	Ireland	DNF			
—	25	Weronika Biela	Poland		DSQ		
—	24	Nicole Baumgartner	Switzerland	DSQ			
—	22	Emi Sato	Japan	DSQ			

== Elimination round ==
The 16 best racers advanced to the elimination round.

1/8 finals
4	(Switzerland) Jenny
13	(Poland) Król	+0.68
5	(Russia) Valova
12	(China) Zang	+0.74
8	(Germany) Langenhorst
9	(Russia) Salikhova	DNF
1	(Germany) Jörg
16	(South Korea) Jeong	+0.38
2	(Switzerland) Kummer	DSQ
15	(Russia) Bykova
7	(Germany) Hofmeister	+0.10
10	(Austria) Schöffmann
6	(Ukraine) Dancha
11	(Netherlands) Dekker	DSQ
3	(Russia) Soboleva
14	(Italy) Ochner	+0.45

Quarterfinals
4	(Switzerland) Jenny
5	(Russia) Valova	DSQ
8	(Germany) Langenhorst	+0.69
1	(Germany) Jörg
15	(Russia) Bykova
10	(Austria) Schöffmann	+6.84
6	(Ukraine) Dancha	+13.31
3	(Russia) Soboleva

Semifinals
4	(Switzerland) Jenny	+2.79
1	(Germany) Jörg
15	(Russia) Bykova	+1.30
3	(Russia) Soboleva

Finals
1	(Germany) Jörg
3	(Russia) Soboleva	DSQ
Third place
4	(Switzerland) Jenny
15	(Russia) Bykova	+0.37
