= Snowboarding at the 2022 Winter Olympics – Women's parallel giant slalom =

Women's parallel giant slalom at the XXIV Olympic Winter Games
- Snowboarding
- Venue: Genting Snow Park, Zhangjiakou
- Date: 8 February
- Competitors: 31 from 14 nations

Medalists
1st place, gold medalist(s)		Ester Ledecká	Czech Republic
2nd place, silver medalist(s)		Daniela Ulbing	Austria
3rd place, bronze medalist(s)		Glorija Kotnik	Slovenia

The women's parallel giant slalom competition in snowboarding at the 2022 Winter Olympics was held on 8 February, at the Genting Snow Park in Zhangjiakou. Ester Ledecká of the Czech Republic won the event, defending her 2018 title. Daniela Ulbing of Austria won the silver medal, and Glorija Kotnik of Slovenia the bronze medal. For Ulbing and Kotnik, these were the first Olympic medals.

The 2018 silver medalist, Selina Jörg, did not qualify for the Olympics, but the bronze medalist, Ramona Theresia Hofmeister, did. At the 2021–22 FIS Snowboard World Cup, five parallel giant slalom events were held before the Olympics. Sofia Nadyrshina was leading the ranking, followed by Ulbing and Ladina Jenny. Jörg is the 2021 world champion, with Nadyrshina and Julia Dujmovits being the silver and bronze medalists, respectively.

== Qualification ==
A total of 32 snowboarders qualified to compete at the games. For an athlete to compete they must have a minimum of 100.00 FIS points on the FIS Points List on January 17, 2022, and a top 30 finish in a World Cup event or at the FIS Snowboard World Championships 2021. A country could enter a maximum of four athletes into the event.

== Results ==
=== Qualification run ===
The qualification was started at 10:40.

Rank	Bib	Name	Country	Blue course	Red course	Total	Notes
1	12	Ester Ledecká	Czech Republic	41.38	42.25	1:23.63	Q
2	6	Ramona Theresia Hofmeister	Germany	42.14	44.06	1:26.20	Q
3	5	Tsubaki Miki	Japan	44.52	42.63	1:27.15	Q
4	2	Sofia Nadyrshina	ROC	42.84	44.38	1:27.22	Q
5	7	Julia Dujmovits	Austria	44.50	42.93	1:27.43	Q
6	3	Carolin Langenhorst	Germany	45.35	42.25	1:27.60	Q
7	14	Daniela Ulbing	Austria	43.16	44.61	1:27.77	Q
8	1	Aleksandra Król	Poland	45.14	42.96	1:28.10	Q
9	10	Polina Smolentsova	ROC	43.85	44.31	1:28.16	Q
10	20	Megan Farrell	Canada	43.96	44.41	1:28.37	Q
11	16	Julie Zogg	Switzerland	43.90	44.50	1:28.40	Q
12	4	Patrizia Kummer	Switzerland	43.52	44.96	1:28.48	Q
13	18	Michelle Dekker	Netherlands	43.64	45.09	1:28.73	Q
14	24	Glorija Kotnik	Slovenia	43.44	45.09	1:28.73	Q
15	17	Tomoka Takeuchi	Japan	45.32	43.51	1:28.83	Q
16	8	Nadya Ochner	Italy	43.91	44.93	1:28.84	Q
17	13	Ladina Jenny	Switzerland	45.02	43.96	1:28.98	
18	26	Jeong Hae-rim	South Korea	43.63	45.47	1:29.10	
19	23	Gong Naiying	China	45.62	43.69	1:29.31	
20	11	Natalia Soboleva	ROC	45.85	44.09	1:29.94	
21	31	Kaylie Buck	Canada	46.02	44.12	1:30.14	
22	27	Weronika Biela	Poland	46.16	44.59	1:30.75	
23	29	Zuzana Maděrová	Czech Republic	48.05	46.54	1:34.59	
24	30	Aleksandra Michalik	Poland	51.06	46.05	1:37.11	
25	21	Zang Ruxin	China	46.22	51.26	1:37.48	
26	25	Annamari Dancha	Ukraine	48.82	48.97	1:37.79	
27	9	Melanie Hochreiter	Germany	1:00.30	42.44	1:42.74	
28	19	Jessica Keiser	Switzerland	59.85	47.30	1:47.15	
29	22	Lucia Dalmasso	Italy	54.68	53.00	1:47.68	
30	15	Milena Bykova	ROC	DSQ	45.17	DSQ	
	28	Jennifer Hawkrigg	Canada	DNF		DNF	

=== Elimination round ===
1/8 finals
4 Nadyrshina (ROC)	+0.03
13 Dekker (NED)
5 Dujmovits (AUT)
12 Kummer (SUI)	+0.20
8 Król (POL)
9 Smolentsova (ROC)	+0.16
1 Ledecká (CZE)
16 Ochner (ITA)	DNF
2 Hofmeister (GER)
15 Takeuchi (JPN)	DSQ
7 Ulbing (AUT)
10 Farrell (CAN)	+0.50
6 Langenhorst (GER)
11 Zogg (SUI)	+0.08
3 Miki (JPN)	DNF
14 Kotnik (SLO)

Quarterfinals
13 Dekker (NED)
5 Dujmovits (AUT)	+4.29
8 Król (POL)	DNF
1 Ledecká (CZE)
2 Hofmeister (GER)	+0.14
7 Ulbing (AUT)
6 Langenhorst (GER)	+0.15
14 Kotnik (SLO)

Semifinals
13 Dekker (NED)	DNF
1 Ledecká (CZE)
7 Ulbing (AUT)
14 Kotnik (SLO)	+0.21

Final
1 Ledecká (CZE)
7 Ulbing (AUT)	DNF
Third place
13 Dekker (NED)	DNF
14 Kotnik (SLO)
