= FIS Freestyle Ski and Snowboarding World Championships 2021 – Women's parallel giant slalom =

Women's parallel giant slalom at the FIS Freestyle Ski and Snowboarding World Championships 2021
- Location: Rogla, Slovenia
- Date: 1 March
- Competitors: 51 from 20 nations

Medalists
gold medal	Selina Jörg	Germany
silver medal	Sofia Nadyrshina
bronze medal	Julia Dujmovits	Austria

The Women's parallel giant slalom competition at the FIS Freestyle Ski and Snowboarding World Championships 2021 was held on 1 March 2021.

== Qualification ==
The qualification was started at 09:00. After the first run, the top 16 snowboarders on each course were allowed a second run on the opposite course.

Rank	Bib	Name	Country	Blue course	Red course	Total	Notes
1	30	Ramona Theresia Hofmeister	Germany	32.69	33.78	1:06.47	Q
2	19	Cheyenne Loch	Germany	33.79	32.76	1:06.55	Q
3	20	Selina Jörg	Germany	32.49	34.14	1:06.63	Q
4	26	Sofia Nadyrshina	Russian Ski Federation	32.56	34.07	1:06.63	Q
5	18	Julie Zogg	Switzerland	33.48	33.68	1:07.16	Q
6	36	Tomoka Takeuchi	Japan	33.59	33.63	1:07.22	Q
7	29	Claudia Riegler	Austria	33.80	33.51	1:07.31	Q
8	25	Sabine Schöffmann	Austria	33.79	33.68	1:07.47	Q
9	33	Julia Dujmovits	Austria	34.20	33.35	1:07.55	Q
10	21	Carolin Langenhorst	Germany	34.42	33.25	1:07.67	Q
11	28	Ladina Jenny	Switzerland	33.75	33.98	1:07.73	Q
12	42	Megan Farrell	Canada	33.84	33.92	1:07.76	Q
13	34	Jessica Keiser	Switzerland	33.64	34.27	1:07.91	Q
14	37	Aleksandra Król	Poland	33.91	34.08	1:07.99	Q
15	38	Michelle Dekker	Netherlands	34.12	34.08	1:08.20	Q
16	17	Milena Bykova	Russian Ski Federation	34.28	33.96	1:08.24	Q
17	22	Natalia Soboleva	Russian Ski Federation	33.73	34.63	1:08.36	
18	24	Nadya Ochner	Italy	33.99	34.46	1:08.45	
19	23	Melanie Hochreiter	Germany	34.25	34.32	1:08.57	
20	31	Tsubaki Miki	Japan	34.52	34.07	1:08.59	
21	43	Emi Sato	Japan	34.51	34.13	1:08.64	
22	45	Aleksandra Michalik	Poland	34.42	34.56	1:08.98	
23	40	Jeong Hae-rim	South Korea	34.15	34.91	1:09.06	
24	32	Daniela Ulbing	Austria	34.30	35.08	1:09.38	
25	41	Anastasia Kurochkina	Russian Ski Federation	34.97	34.58	1:09.55	
26	39	Annamari Dancha	Ukraine	34.99	34.64	1:09.63	
27	48	Kaylie Buck	Canada	34.77	34.97	1:09.74	
28	35	Patrizia Kummer	Switzerland	34.60	35.22	1:09.82	
29	46	Katrina Gerencser	Canada	34.57	35.64	1:10.21	
30	49	Jang Seo-hee	South Korea	35.59	34.93	1:10.52	
31	51	Kiki Bédier De Prairie	Netherlands	35.76	35.31	1:11.07	
32	52	Iris Pflum	United States	35.45	37.62	1:13.07	
33	47	Jennifer Hawkrigg	Canada		35.39		
34	60	Julia Sitarz	Poland	36.08			
35	55	Klára Šonková	Czech Republic		36.12		
36	53	Lee Jung-eun	South Korea		36.22		
37	56	Paula Anna Vītola	Latvia	36.27			
38	50	Vita Bodnaruk	Ukraine	36.58			
39	58	Nadiia Hapatyn	Ukraine	36.74			
40	63	Kaiya Kizuka	United States		37.10		
41	59	Sara Goltes	Slovenia		37.47		
42	62	Rose Bransford	United States	38.20			
43	64	Adéla Keclíková	Czech Republic	38.21			
44	68	Nisa Özsoy	Turkey	40.17			
45	65	Selin Gülce Güler	Turkey		43.51		
46	66	Sanja Spasovska	North Macedonia	47.20			
47	57	Maggie Rose Carrigan	Ireland		48.94		
48	67	Eleni Arvanitidou	Greece		54.56		
	44	Weronika Biela-Nowaczyk	Poland	DNF			
	61	Millie Bongiorno	Australia		DSQ		
	54	Lily Janousek	United States	DSQ			
	27	Ester Ledecká	Czech Republic		DNS		

== Elimination round ==
The 16 best racers advanced to the elimination round.

1/8 finals
4	(Russia) Sofia Nadyrshina
13	(Switzerland) Jessica Keiser	+0.30
5	(Switzerland) Julie Zogg	+0.02
12	(Canada) Megan Farrell
8	(Austria) Sabine Schöffmann	+0.11
9	(Austria) Julia Dujmovits
1	(Germany) Ramona Theresia Hofmeister
16	(Russia) Milena Bykova	+0.69
2	(Germany) Cheyenne Loch
15	(Netherlands) Michelle Dekker	+0.23
7	(Austria) Claudia Riegler
10	(Germany) Carolin Langenhorst
6	(Japan) Tomoka Takeuchi
11	(Switzerland) Ladina Jenny	+0.09
3	(Germany) Selina Jörg
14	(Poland) Aleksandra Król	+0.41

Quarterfinals
4	(Russia) Sofia Nadyrshina
12	(Canada) Megan Farrell	+0.44
9	(Austria) Julia Dujmovits
1	(Germany) Ramona Theresia Hofmeister	+0.08
2	(Germany) Cheyenne Loch	+0.03
7	(Austria) Claudia Riegler
7	(Japan) Tomoka Takeuchi	+0.13
3	(Germany) Selina Jörg

Semifinals
4	(Russia) Sofia Nadyrshina
9	(Austria) Julia Dujmovits	DNF
7	(Austria) Claudia Riegler	+0.11
3	(Germany) Selina Jörg

Final
4	(Russia) Sofia Nadyrshina	+0.12
3	(Germany) Selina Jörg
Third place
9	(Austria) Julia Dujmovits
7	(Austria) Claudia Riegler	+1.05
