= FIS Freestyle Ski and Snowboarding World Championships 2017 – Women's parallel giant slalom =

The women's parallel giant slalom competition of the FIS Freestyle Ski and Snowboarding World Championships 2017 was held at Sierra Nevada, Spain on March 15 (qualifying and finals). 38 athletes from 17 countries competed.

== Results ==
=== Qualification ===
Each participant takes one run on either of the courses. After the first run, only the top 32 are allowed a second run on the opposite course.

Rank	Bib	Name	Country	Blue Course	Red Course	Overall Time	Notes
1	9	Ester Ledecka	Czech Republic	43.73	41.70	1:25.43	Q
2	13	Alena Zavarzina	Russia	43.85	41.62	1:25.47	Q
3	3	Julia Dujmovits	Austria	44.14	41.83	1:25.97	Q
4	17	Ekaterina Khatomchenkova	Russia	43.96	42.41	1:26.37	Q
5	11	Ramona Theresia Hofmeister	Germany	44.51	41.95	1:26.46	Q
6	12	Patrizia Kummer	Switzerland	42.35	44.24	1:26.59	Q
7	2	Yekaterina Tudegesheva	Russia	41.59	45.01	1:26.60	Q
8	4	Tomoka Takeuchi	Japan	41.69	44.93	1:26.62	Q
9	18	Daniela Ulbing	Austria	42.36	44.26	1:26.62	Q
10	7	Julie Zogg	Switzerland	43.75	42.87	1:26.62	Q
11	10	Sabine Schöffmann	Austria	43.00	43.89	1:26.89	Q
12	16	Stefanie Müller	Switzerland	42.91	44.00	1:26.91	Q
13	15	Ina Meschik	Austria	44.28	43.01	1:27.29	Q
14	1	Carolin Langenhorst	Germany	45.43	42.06	1:27.49	Q
15	19	Cheyenne Loch	Germany	44.65	42.93	1:27.58	Q
16	6	Selina Jörg	Germany	42.68	44.97	1:27.65	Q
17	8	Ladina Jenny	Switzerland	42.85	44.80	1:27.65	
18	5	Nadya Ochner	Italy	45.49	42.27	1:27.76	
19	22	Michelle Dekker	Netherlands	43.25	45.02	1:28.27	
20	25	Aleksandra Krol	Poland	45.04	43.75	1:28.79	
21	20	Gong Naiying	China	44.53	44.61	1:29.14	
22	24	Shin Da-Hae	South Korea	44.47	45.24	1:29.71	
23	27	Eri Yanetani	Japan	44.31	45.46	1:29.77	
24	26	Jeong Hae-Rim	South Korea	44.31	45.61	1:29.92	
25	34	Karolina Sztokfisz	Poland	45.80	45.94	1:31.74	
26	31	Megan Farrell	United States	47.53	44.80	1:32.33	
27	30	Zang Ruxin	China	45.28	47.40	1:32.68	
28	28	Gloria Kotnik	Slovenia	45.17	47.58	1:32.75	
29	35	Xu Xiaoxiao	China	46.68	46.15	1:32.83	
30	23	Weronika Biela	Poland	51.17	43.67	1:34.84	
31	36	Iva Polanec	Slovenia	46.98	48.00	1:34.98	
32	29	Annamari Dancha	Ukraine	57.32	44.88	1:42.20	
33	21	Elizaveta Salikhova	Russia		46.38	46.38	
34	32	Katrina Gerencser	Canada	47.13		47.13	
35	33	Maggie Carrigan	United States		47.51	47.51	
36	37	Teodora Pentcheva	Bulgaria		47.99	47.99	
37	38	Elif Kubra Geneske	Turkey	1:02.76		1:02.76	
	14	Claudia Riegler	Austria	DSQ		DSQ	

=== Elimination round ===
Round of 16
4	Ekaterina Khatomchenkova (RUS)	+0.20
13	Ina Meschik (AUT)	W
5	Ramona T. Hofmeister (GER)	W
12	Stefanie Müller (SUI)	DSQ
8	Tomoka Takeuchi (JPN)	DSQ
9	Daniela Ulbing (AUT)	W
1	Ester Ledecka (CZE)	W
16	Selina Jörg (GER)	+0.47
2	Alena Zavarzina (RUS)	W
15	Cheyenne Loch (GER)	+0.41
7	Yekaterina Tudegesheva (RUS)	W
10	Julie Zogg (SUI)	+0.57
6	Patrizia Kummer (SUI)	W
11	Sabine Schöffmann (AUT)	+0.65
3	Julia Dujmovits (AUT)	W
14	Carolin Langenhorst (GER)	+1.01

Quarterfinals
13	Ina Meschik (AUT)	+0.26
5	Ramona T. Hofmeister (GER)	W
9	Daniela Ulbing (AUT)	DSQ
1	Ester Ledecka (CZE)	W
2	Alena Zavarzina (RUS)	+7.01
7	Yekaterina Tudegesheva (RUS)	W
6	Patrizia Kummer (SUI)	W
3	Julia Dujmovits (AUT)	+0.46

Semifinals
5	Ramona T. Hofmeister (GER)	DSQ
1	Ester Ledecka (CZE)	W
7	Yekaterina Tudegesheva (RUS)	+8.98
6	Patrizia Kummer (SUI)	W

Finals
1	Ester Ledecka (CZE)	W
6	Patrizia Kummer (SUI)	+0.29
Third place
5	Ramona T. Hofmeister (GER)	DSQ
7	Yekaterina Tudegesheva (RUS)	W
