= FIS Freestyle Ski and Snowboarding World Championships 2021 – Women's parallel slalom =

Women's parallel slalom at the FIS Freestyle Ski and Snowboarding World Championships 2021
- Location: Rogla, Slovenia
- Date: 2 March
- Competitors: 51 from 20 nations

Medalists
gold medal	Sofia Nadyrshina
silver medal	Ramona Theresia Hofmeister	Germany
bronze medal	Selina Jörg	Germany

The Women's parallel slalom competition at the FIS Freestyle Ski and Snowboarding World Championships 2021 was held on 2 March 2021.

== Qualification ==
The qualification was started at 09:00. After the first run, the top 16 snowboarders on each course were allowed a second run on the opposite course.

Rank	Bib	Name	Country	Blue course	Red course	Total	Notes
1	25	Sofia Nadyrshina	Russian Ski Federation	29.90	28.23	58.13	Q
2	26	Ramona Theresia Hofmeister	Germany	28.50	29.75	58.25	Q
3	21	Cheyenne Loch	Germany	30.05	28.37	58.42	Q
4	29	Julie Zogg	Switzerland	29.82	28.74	58.56	Q
5	32	Selina Jörg	Germany	29.33	29.80	59.13	Q
6	34	Megan Farrell	Canada	29.36	30.17	59.53	Q
7	18	Natalia Soboleva	Russian Ski Federation	29.15	30.65	59.80	Q
8	38	Julia Dujmovits	Austria	30.11	29.70	59.81	Q
9	28	Carolin Langenhorst	Germany	29.60	30.45	1:00.05	Q
10	30	Tsubaki Miki	Japan	29.50	30.76	1:00.26	Q
11	17	Daniela Ulbing	Austria	31.67	28.75	1:00.42	Q
12	33	Tomoka Takeuchi	Japan	30.87	29.56	1:00.43	Q
13	27	Claudia Riegler	Austria	31.15	29.42	1:00.57	Q
14	31	Patrizia Kummer	Switzerland	30.86	29.78	1:00.64	Q
15	35	Jessica Keiser	Switzerland	30.26	30.46	1:00.72	Q
16	24	Sabine Schöffmann	Austria	30.11	30.71	1:00.82	Q
17	22	Ladina Jenny	Switzerland	30.05	31.09	1:01.14	
18	47	Jennifer Hawkrigg	Canada	31.24	29.97	1:01.21	
19	39	Annamari Dancha	Ukraine	31.40	30.06	1:01.46	
20	20	Anastasia Kurochkina	Russian Ski Federation	30.20	31.40	1:01.60	
21	51	Aleksandra Michalik	Poland	31.37	30.56	1:01.93	
22	36	Aleksandra Król	Poland	30.57	31.40	1:01.97	
23	48	Jang Seo-hee	South Korea	30.66	31.46	1:02.12	
24	42	Katrina Gerencser	Canada	31.48	30.81	1:02.29	
25	40	Jeong Hae-rim	South Korea	30.88	31.42	1:02.30	
26	46	Kiki Bédier De Prairie	Netherlands	31.41	31.69	1:03.10	
27	41	Kaylie Buck	Canada	32.52	30.81	1:03.33	
28	59	Julia Sitarz	Poland	32.99	31.50	1:04.49	
29	49	Emi Sato	Japan	35.67	30.14	1:05.81	
30	23	Nadya Ochner	Italy	37.55	29.63	1:07.18	
31	44	Larissa Gasser	Switzerland	30.82	41.06	1:11.88	
32	37	Milena Bykova	Russian Ski Federation	DSQ	30.10		
33	52	Lee Jung-eun	South Korea	31.54			
34	43	Iris Pflum	United States		31.55		
35	50	Vita Bodnaruk	Ukraine	31.56			
36	45	Weronika Biela-Nowaczyk	Poland		31.69		
37	53	Lily Janousek	United States		31.78		
38	54	Klára Šonková	Czech Republic	32.73			
39	60	Millie Bongiorno	Australia	32.77			
40	63	Adéla Keclíková	Czech Republic		33.01		
41	56	Maggie Rose Carrigan	Ireland	33.15			
42	58	Sara Goltes	Slovenia	33.53			
43	67	Nisa Özsoy	Turkey		34.33		
44	19	Michelle Dekker	Netherlands		35.07		
45	62	Kaiya Kizuka	United States	35.41			
46	64	Selin Gülce Güler	Turkey	38.65			
47	65	Sanja Spasovska	North Macedonia		42.51		
48	55	Paula Anna Vītola	Latvia		42.90		
49	66	Eleni Arvanitidou	Greece	52.16			
	57	Nadiia Hapatyn	Ukraine		DNF		
	61	Rose Bransford	United States		DSQ		

== Elimination round ==
The 16 best racers advanced to the elimination round.

1/8 finals
4	(Switzerland) Julie Zogg	+0.04
13	(Austria) Claudia Riegler
5	(Germany) Selina Jörg
12	(Japan) Tomoka Takeuchi	+0.19
8	(Austria) Julia Dujmovits
9	(Germany) Carolin Langenhorst	+0.19
1	(Russia) Sofia Nadyrshina
16	(Austria) Sabine Schöffmann	+0.14
2	(Germany) Ramona Theresia Hofmeister
15	(Switzerland) Jessica Keiser	+0.33
7	(Russia) Natalia Soboleva
10	(Japan) Tsubaki Miki	+0.13
6	(Canada) Megan Farrell
11	(Austria) Daniela Ulbing	+0.14
3	(Germany) Cheyenne Loch
14	(Switzerland) Patrizia Kummer	+0.16

Quarterfinals
13	(Austria) Claudia Riegler	+0.25
5	(Germany) Selina Jörg
8	(Austria) Julia Dujmovits	+0.59
1	(Russia) Sofia Nadyrshina
2	(Germany) Ramona Theresia Hofmeister
7	(Russia) Natalia Soboleva	+0.37
6	(Canada) Megan Farrell
3	(Germany) Cheyenne Loch	+0.57

Semifinals
5	(Germany) Selina Jörg	+0.15
1	(Russia) Sofia Nadyrshina
2	(Germany) Ramona Theresia Hofmeister
6	(Canada) Megan Farrell	+0.38

Final
1	(Russia) Sofia Nadyrshina
2	(Germany) Ramona Theresia Hofmeister	DNF
Third place
5	(Germany) Selina Jörg
6	(Canada) Megan Farrell	+0.08
