= FIS Freestyle Ski and Snowboarding World Championships 2023 – Women's parallel slalom =

Women's parallel slalom at the FIS Freestyle Ski and Snowboarding World Championships 2023
- Location: Bakuriani, Georgia
- Dates: 21 February
- Competitors: 39 from 16 nations

Medalists
gold medal	Julie Zogg	Switzerland
silver medal	Ladina Jenny	Switzerland
bronze medal	Sabine Schöffmann	Austria

The Women's parallel slalom competition at the FIS Freestyle Ski and Snowboarding World Championships 2023 was held on 21 February 2023.

== Qualification ==
The qualification was started at 09:15. After the first run, the top 16 snowboarders on each course were allowed a second run on the opposite course.

Rank	Bib	Name	Country	Blue course	Red course	Total	Notes
1	32	Julie Zogg	Switzerland	39.52	40.17	1:19.69	Q
2	27	Tsubaki Miki	Japan	40.27	39.77	1:20.04	Q
3	17	Patrizia Kummer	Switzerland	41.08	39.06	1:20.14	Q
4	34	Cheyenne Loch	Germany	39.62	40.82	1:20.44	Q
5	29	Sabine Schöffmann	Austria	40.48	40.18	1:20.66	Q
6	26	Ramona Theresia Hofmeister	Germany	39.53	41.19	1:20.72	Q
7	18	Daniela Ulbing	Austria	39.28	41.65	1:20.93	Q
8	23	Claudia Riegler	Austria	40.15	40.79	1:20.94	Q
9	24	Aleksandra Król	Poland	40.69	40.52	1:21.21	Q
10	21	Ladina Jenny	Switzerland	41.01	40.22	1:21.23	Q
11	25	Carolin Langenhorst	Germany	41.69	39.79	1:21.48	Q
12	33	Zuzana Maděrová	Czech Republic	40.92	40.84	1:21.76	Q
13	22	Annamari Dancha	Ukraine	41.05	40.76	1:21.81	Q
14	19	Michelle Dekker	Netherlands	41.13	41.08	1:22.21	Q
15	31	Lucia Dalmasso	Italy	41.63	40.66	1:22.29	Q
16	20	Jessica Keiser	Switzerland	40.88	41.51	1:22.39	Q
17	35	Tomoka Takeuchi	Japan	41.27	41.79	1:23.06	
18	37	Iris Pflum	United States	41.92	41.53	1:23.45	
19	38	Gloria Kotnik	Slovenia	41.66	42.03	1:23.69	
20	30	Melanie Hochreiter	Germany	40.71	43.00	1:23.71	
21	28	Nadya Ochner	Italy	42.28	41.75	1:24.03	
22	43	Martina Ankele	Austria	42.42	41.69	1:24.11	
23	36	Elisa Caffont	Italy	42.16	42.20	1:24.36	
24	39	Jeong Hae-rim	South Korea	42.17	42.24	1:24.41	
25	48	Dong Xue	China	42.40	42.36	1:24.76	
26	45	Olimpia Kwiatkowska	Poland	42.30	43.19	1:25.49	
27	44	Maria Chyc	Poland	42.25	43.75	1:26.00	
28	52	Klára Šonková	Czech Republic	43.10	43.22	1:26.32	
29	47	Alexa Bullis	United States	43.83	42.97	1:26.80	
30	46	Adéla Keclíková	Czech Republic	43.21	44.44	1:27.65	
31	40	Millie Bongiorno	Australia	43.02	46.79	1:29.81	
32	41	Teodora Pentcheva	Bulgaria	46.38	44.20	1:30.58	
33	54	Oleksandra Malovanna	Ukraine	44.24		—	
34	49	Jang Seo-hee	South Korea		44.65	—	
35	55	Kong Binbin	China		45.31	—	
36	50	Vita Bodnaruk	Ukraine	45.59		—	
37	42	Abby Van Groningen	Canada	45.83		—	
38	53	Nadiia Hapatyn	Ukraine		49.99	—	
39	51	Hinano Oshima	Japan		50.22	—	

== Elimination round ==
The 16 best racers advanced to the elimination round.

Round of 16
4 (Germany) Loch
13 (Ukraine) Dancha	+0.65
5 (Austria) Schöffmann
12 (Czech Republic) Maděrová	+2.26
8 (Austria) Riegler
9 (Poland) Król	+0.28
1 (Switzerland) Zogg
16 (Switzerland) Keiser	+0.78
2 (Japan) Miki	+0.89
15 (Italy) Dalmasso
7 (Austria) Ulbing	+3.74
10 (Switzerland) Jenny
6 (Germany) Hofmeister
11 (Germany) Langenhorst	DNF
3 (Switzerland) Kummer	+0.11
14 (Netherlands) Dekker

Quarterfinals
4 (Germany) Loch	+1.08
5 (Austria) Schöffmann
8 (Austria) Riegler	+0.43
1 (Switzerland) Zogg
15 (Italy) Dalmasso	+4.64
10 (Switzerland) Jenny
6 (Germany) Hofmeister
14 (Netherlands) Dekker	+2.18

Semifinals
5 (Austria) Schöffmann	+0.34
1 (Switzerland) Zogg
10 (Switzerland) Jenny
6 (Germany) Hofmeister	DNF

Final
1 (Switzerland) Zogg
10 (Switzerland) Jenny	+0.26
Third place
5 (Austria) Schöffmann
6 (Germany) Hofmeister	DNF
