= FIS Freestyle Ski and Snowboarding World Championships 2023 – Mixed snowboard parallel slalom =

Mixed parallel slalom team at the FIS Freestyle Ski and Snowboarding World Championships 2023
- Location: Bakuriani, Georgia
- Dates: 22 February
- Competitors: 48 from 13 nations
- Teams: 24

Medalists
gold medal	Aaron March; Nadya Ochner	Italy
silver medal	Andreas Prommegger; Sabine Schöffmann	Austria
bronze medal	Dario Caviezel; Julie Zogg	Switzerland

The Mixed parallel slalom team competition at the FIS Freestyle Ski and Snowboarding World Championships 2023 was held on 22 February 2023.

== Participants ==
Start order: Male, female

Bib	Team	Bib	Team	Bib	Team
1	Austria 1 Andreas Prommegger; Sabine Schöffmann	9	Switzerland 2 Gian Casanova; Ladina Jenny	17	Ukraine 1 Mykhailo Kharuk; Annamari Dancha
2	Austria 3 Fabian Obmann; Daniela Ulbing	10	South Korea 1 Lee Sang-ho; Jeong Hae-rim	18	Poland 2 Michał Nowaczyk; Olimpia Kwiatkowska
3	Austria 2 Arvid Auner; Claudia Riegler	11	Germany 2 Elias Huber; Cheyenne Loch	19	China 1 Qin Zihan; Dong Xue
4	Switzerland 1 Dario Caviezel; Julie Zogg	12	United States 1 Cody Winters; Iris Pflum	20	South Korea 2 Kim Sang-kyum; Jang Seo-hee
5	Germany 1 Stefan Baumeister; Ramona Theresia Hofmeister	13	Slovenia 1 Tim Mastnak; Gloria Kotnik	21	United States 2 Dylan Udolf; Alexa Bullis
6	Italy 1 Maurizio Bormolini; Lucia Dalmasso	14	Japan 1 Ryusuke Shinohara; Tsubaki Miki	22	Czechia 1 Kryštof Minárik; Zuzana Maděrová
7	Italy 2 Aaron March; Nadya Ochner	15	Canada 1 Ben Heldman; Abby Van Groningen	23	Ukraine 2 Oleksandr Belinskyi; Oleksandra Malovanna
8	Poland 1 Oskar Kwiatkowski; Aleksandra Król	16	Japan 2 Masaki Shiba; Tomoka Takeuchi	24	Czechia 2 Adam Počinek; Klára Šonková

== Results ==
Pre-heats
Slovenia 1
South Korea 2	+0.56
United States 1
United States 2	+2.10
Switzerland 2
Czechia 2	+4.31
Japan 2	+1.01
Ukraine 1
Canada 1
Poland 2	DNF
South Korea 1
Ukraine 2	+0.86
Germany 2
Czechia 1	+1.61
Japan 1
China 1	+0.63

1/8 finals
Switzerland 1
Slovenia 1	DNF
Germany 1
United States 1	+0.39
Poland 1
Switzerland 2	+0.87
Austria 1
Ukraine 1	DNF
Austria 3
Canada 1	+3.77
Italy 2
South Korea 1	+0.70
Italy 1
Germany 2	+0.23
Austria 2
Japan 1	+0.43

Quarterfinals
Switzerland 1
Germany 1	DNF
Poland 1	+1.71
Austria 1
Austria 3	+0.42
Italy 2
Italy 1
Austria 2	+3.65

Semifinals
Switzerland 1	+0.06
Austria 1
Italy 2
Italy 1	DNF

Final
Austria 1	+0.29
Italy 2
Third place
Switzerland 1
Italy 1	DNF
