= Snowboarding at the 2018 Winter Olympics – Women's parallel giant slalom =

Women's parallel giant slalom at the XXIII Olympic Winter Games
- Venue: Bogwang Phoenix Park
- Date: 24 February
- Competitors: 31 from 14 nations

Medalists
1st place, gold medalist(s)		Ester Ledecká	Czech Republic
2nd place, silver medalist(s)		Selina Jörg	Germany
3rd place, bronze medalist(s)		Ramona Theresia Hofmeister	Germany

The women's parallel giant slalom competition of the 2018 Winter Olympics was held on 24 February 2018 Bogwang Phoenix Park in Pyeongchang, South Korea.

== Qualification ==
The top 32 athletes in the Olympic quota allocation list qualified, with a maximum of four athletes per National Olympic Committee (NOC) allowed. All athletes qualifying must also have placed in the top 30 of a FIS World Cup event or the FIS Freestyle Ski and Snowboarding World Championships 2017 during the qualification period (1 July 2016 to 21 January 2018) and also have a minimum of 100 FIS points to compete. If the host country, South Korea at the 2018 Winter Olympics did not qualify, their chosen athlete would displace the last qualified athlete, granted all qualification criterion was met.

== Results ==
=== Qualification run ===
The qualification was held at 09:00.

Rank	Bib	Name	Country	Blue course	Red course	Total	Notes
1	7	Ester Ledecká	Czech Republic	45.58	43.32	1:28.90	Q
2	1	Alena Zavarzina	Olympic Athletes from Russia	45.43	44.73	1:30.16	Q
3	16	Selina Jörg	Germany	44.67	45.60	1:30.27	Q
4	10	Carolin Langenhorst	Germany	45.02	46.56	1:31.58	Q
5	8	Ramona Theresia Hofmeister	Germany	45.36	46.62	1:31.98	Q
6	9	Tomoka Takeuchi	Japan	47.86	45.00	1:32.86	Q
7	14	Julie Zogg	Switzerland	45.70	47.19	1:32.89	Q
8	3	Daniela Ulbing	Austria	47.07	46.00	1:33.07	Q
9	20	Milena Bykova	Olympic Athletes from Russia	46.43	46.66	1:33.09	Q
10	21	Aleksandra Król	Poland	47.02	46.11	1:33.13	Q
11	4	Julia Dujmovits	Austria	45.95	47.21	1:33.16	Q
12	17	Ladina Jenny	Switzerland	46.96	46.23	1:33.19	Q
13	6	Ina Meschik	Austria	46.21	47.02	1:33.23	Q
14	15	Yekaterina Tudegesheva	Olympic Athletes from Russia	47.44	45.98	1:33.42	Q
15	11	Glorija Kotnik	Slovenia	48.00	45.52	1:33.52	Q
16	2	Patrizia Kummer	Switzerland	47.00	46.59	1:33.59	Q
17	5	Michelle Dekker	Netherlands	47.42	46.18	1:33.60	
18	19	Nadya Ochner	Italy	48.00	45.80	1:33.80	
19	13	Natalia Soboleva	Olympic Athletes from Russia	47.78	46.15	1:33.93	
20	26	Jeong Hae-rim	South Korea	46.93	47.18	1:34.11	
21	24	Anke Wöhrer	Germany	47.83	46.87	1:34.70	
22	27	Zang Ruxin	China	48.17	47.09	1:35.26	
23	23	Stefanie Müller	Switzerland	48.79	46.80	1:35.59	
24	25	Weronika Biela	Poland	48.10	47.82	1:35.92	
25	31	Shin Da-hae	South Korea	49.13	46.91	1:36.04	
26	22	Gong Naiying	China	48.63	47.73	1:36.36	
27	30	Teodora Pencheva	Bulgaria	49.01	49.62	1:38.63	
28	18	Annamari Dancha	Ukraine	1:00.12	46.52	1:46.64	
	28	Karolina Sztokfisz	Poland	47.13	DSQ	DSQ	
	12	Claudia Riegler	Austria	DNF		DNF	
	29	Xu Xiaoxiao	China		DSQ	DSQ	

=== Elimination round ===
The 16 best racers advanced to the elimination round.

1/8 finals
4	Langenhorst (GER)	+0.02
13	Meschik (AUT)
5	Hofmeister (GER)
12	Jenny (SUI)	DNF
8	Ulbing (AUT)
9	Bykova (OAR)	+0.52
1	Ledecká (CZE)
16	Kummer (SUI)	+0.71
2	Zavarzina (OAR)
15	Kotnik (SLO)	+0.03
7	Zogg (SUI)
10	Król (POL)	+0.70
6	Takeuchi (JPN)
11	Dujmovits (AUT)	+0.17
3	Jörg (GER)
14	Tudegesheva (OAR)	+0.65

Quarterfinals
13	Meschik (AUT)	+0.78
5	Hofmeister (GER)
8	Ulbing (AUT)	+0.97
1	Ledecká (CZE)
2	Zavarzina (OAR)
7	Zogg (SUI)	+1.88
6	Takeuchi (JPN)	+0.62
3	Jörg (GER)

Semifinals
5	Hofmeister (GER)	DNF
1	Ledecká (CZE)
2	Zavarzina (OAR)	DNF
3	Jörg (GER)

Finals
1	Ledecká (CZE)
3	Jörg (GER)	+0.46
Third place
5	Hofmeister (GER)
2	Zavarzina (OAR)	+4.07
