= Rogla Ski Resort =

Slovenian ski resort

Rogla
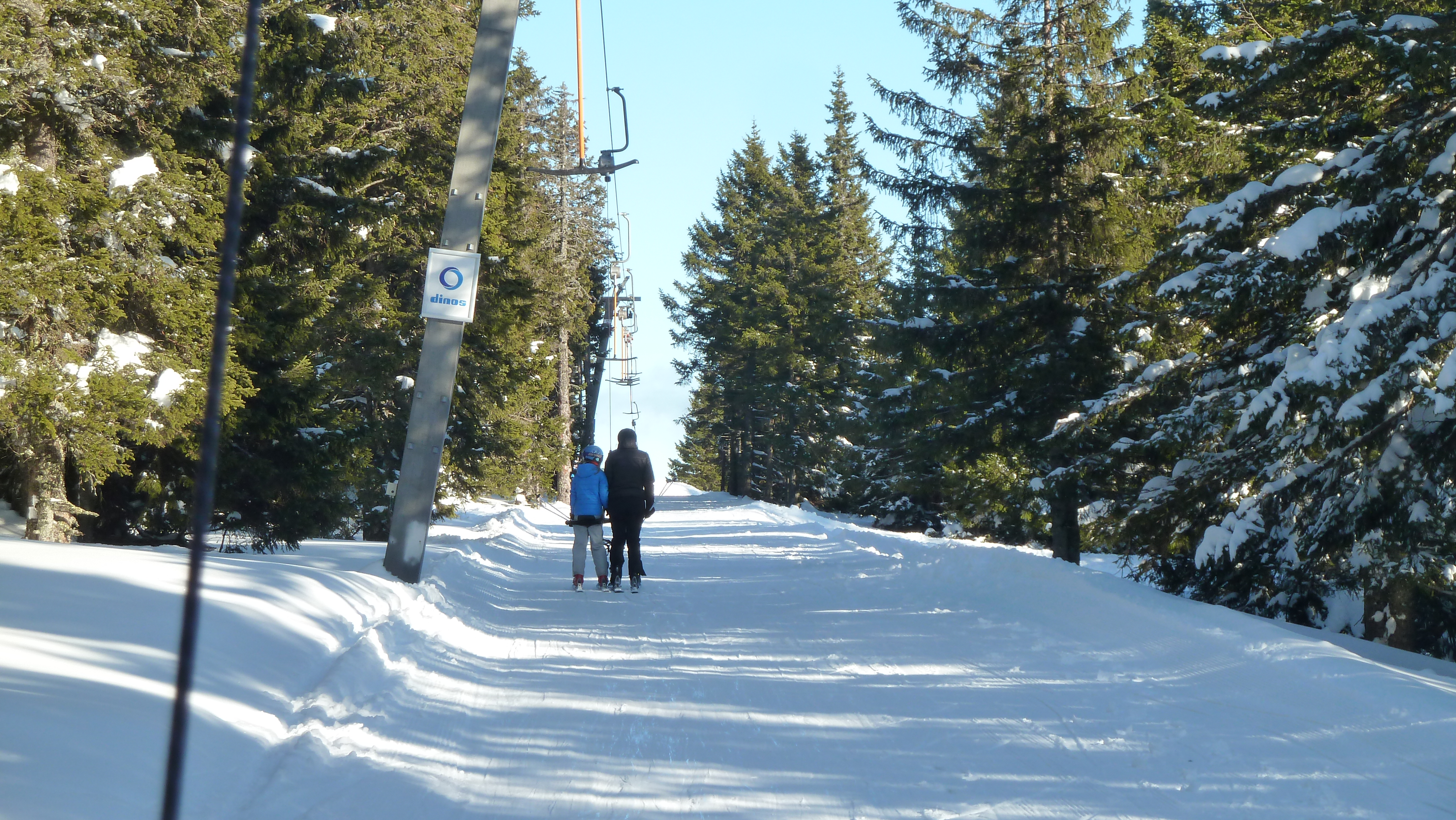
- Surface lift from Mašinžaga to Jurgovo

- Location in Slovenia Rogla (Alps) Rogla (Europe)
- Location: Rogla, Zreče, Slovenia (Zreče Pohorje)
- Nearest city: Maribor (52 km); Graz (117 km); Ljubljana (119 km); Trieste (212 km); Vienna (307 km); Venice (358 km); Budapest (385 km); Munich (481 km)
- Coordinates: 46.4514°N 15.3287°E
- Vertical: 467 m (1,532 ft)
- Top elevation: 1,517 m (4,977 ft)
- Base elevation: 1,050 m (3,445 ft)
- Skiable area: 100 hectares (250 acres)
- Trails: 13.5 km (8.4 mi): 5.7 km (3.5 mi); 5.3 km (3.3 mi); 2.5 km (1.6 mi)
- Longest run: 1.32 km (0.82 mi) - Jurgovo I
- Lift system: 11 (2 chairlifts, 9 surface lifts)
- Lift capacity: 13,500 / h
- Terrain parks: Rogla Fun Park
- Snowfall: 550 cm (220 in)
- Snowmaking: 100% of area
- Night skiing: Košuta, Jasa I
- Website: rogla.eu

Rogla Ski Resort is a Slovenian ski resort opened in 1975 at Rogla, Zreče, located at the top of the Zreče Pohorje range and regularly the most or second most visited Slovenian ski resort, with over 200,000 skiers per season and capacity of 13,500/h. It is the seventh-largest Slovenian ski resort by ski area, with a total 13.5 km (8.4 mi) of ski slopes and 24 km (15 mi) of cross-country tracks.

Two outdoor stadiums and a multipurpose indoor sports hall, are one of the highest elevation stadiums/indoor arenas in Europe. Resort offers many activities, such as alpine skiing, cross-country skiing, squash, snowboarding, hiking, climbing wall, soccer, handball, basketball, athletics, mountain bike downhill, horseback riding, swimming, fitness, tennis, dog sledding, a forest canopy trail, and an alpine coaster.

The Rogla Olympic Center (Olimpijski športni center Rogla), used as high-elevation training camp, has hosted many prominent sports teams and athletes, such as Monica Seles, Goran Ivanišević, Petra Majdič, Goran Dragić, Paris Saint-Germain, Panathinaikos F.C., the Spain men's national handball team, and the France men's national handball team.

They are firmly a part of FIS Snowboard World Cup calendar hosting parallel giant slalom events since 2013; and FIS Cross-Country World Cup (2009, 2011).

== History ==
=== Early years ===
Early tourism dates back to 1928, when the Pesek cabin was opened. The first 10-meter high wooden watchtower was opened in 1934 at the highest point of Rogla, which was destroyed during World War II and replaced with a steel 30-meter high watchtower at the same place in 1956 and which is still standing. As of 2015 this was the highest watchtower in Slovenia.

In 1952 the old cabin was opened for herders only and since 1956 has also been open for tourism. It was the main gathering point at Rogla for many years, where modern tourism started and around which hotels were built is still very popular nowadays. Unior, a blacksmith company from valley lower in Zreče took over the cabin in 1972.

=== 1975: Start of mass tourism ===
In 1974 Unior's management commissioned studies for the development of Rogla as a ski resort. The road leading to the peak was widened and the first ski lifts were built.

The main hotel and sports area with the Zlodejevo ski slope (the first slope) below an old cabin and Uniorček opened in late 1975 at an elevation of 1,517 m (4,977 ft).

=== 1980: Huge investments ===
In 1978 construction began on the Hotel Dobrava in Zreče and the Hotel Planja on Rogla. Around Old Cabin they opened Hotel Planja in 1980, with the new ski lifts Mašinžaga and Ostruščica, and by 1981 the Hotel Dobrava had opened, along with a new swimming pool and an athletics and football stadium. In 1983 Hotel Rogla was opened next to Old Cabin.

=== 1985: Jurgovo opened ===
In 1985 the Jurgovo black ski slopes were opened.

=== 1987: Indoor hall and chairlift Planja opened ===
On 12 December 1987, they opened multipurpose sports indoor hall with first ever squash court in Slovenia and 2-chair lift Planja-Mašinžaga at the same time.

By the 1990s, Rogla had a capacity of over 1,200 beds and ski lifts handling 12,200 skiers per hour. In 1993 the Košuta ski lift was opened.

Between 2000 and 2004, a new Hotel Dobrava was opened, and two four-seat chairlifts were constructed to replaced old and outdated two-seated chairlifts. The artificial snow system was extended and upgraded to make Rogla one of the best ski resorts in Slovenia and the first alpine mountain coaster in Slovenia.

In December 2007 Rogla Fun Park was opened along the Mašinžaga ski slope for skiers and snowboarders.

=== 2009: World Cup debut ===
In 2009 FIS Cross-country skiing World Cup events were organized for the first time, repeated two years later.

In October 2010 a new Catholic church was built a top of the mountain. In December 2012 the Jasa II ski lift and slope were opened, intended for snowboard and ski cross.

In June 2014 the new four-star Hotel Natura was opened next to Cross-Country World Cup stadium.

=== 2019: Second watch tower opened ===
In September 2019 a new 37-meter (121 ft) high wooden watch tower and trails called the Canopy Trail (Pot med krošnjami) was opened. It has a total walking distance of 1 kilometer (0.62 mi). It is only the ninth structure in the world of this kind.

In June 2020, first of this kind in Slovenia, 60 metres long spiral dry slide around outside of 37 meter high wooden Canopy Trail watch tower (Pot med krošnjami).

== Ski area ==
=== Slopes ===
Slope	Length	Drop	Level
Uniorček 1	300 m	43 m	
Uniorček 2	310 m	42 m	
Košuta	730 m	122 m	
Jasa 1 (ex Ostruščica 3)	500 m	140 m	
Jasa 2	550 m	140 m	
Mašinžaga	1100 m	171 m	
Ostruščica 1	600 m	142 m	
Ostruščica 2	620 m	142 m	
Planja	1294 m	153 m	
Planja (left sleeve)	475 m	100 m	
Jurgovo 1	1320 m	359 m	
Jurgovo 1 (right sleeve)	760 m	100 m	
Jurgovo 2	753 m	100 m	
Jurgovo 3	683 m	235 m	
Jurgovo 3 (black)	683 m	235 m	
Jurgovo 3 to 1 (connection)	620 m	15 m	

=== Lifts ===
Lift	Type
Planja	4 chairlift
Uniorček	covered belt lift
Uniorček 1	button lift
Uniorček 2	button lift
Mašinžaga 1	T-bar lift
Mašinžaga 2	T-bar lift
Ostruščica 1	T-bar lift
Ostruščica 2	T-bar lift
Jasa	T-bar lift
Košuta	T-bar lift
Jurgovo 1	4 chairlift
Jurgovo 2	T-bar lift
Jurgovo 3	button lift

== Winter tourism ==
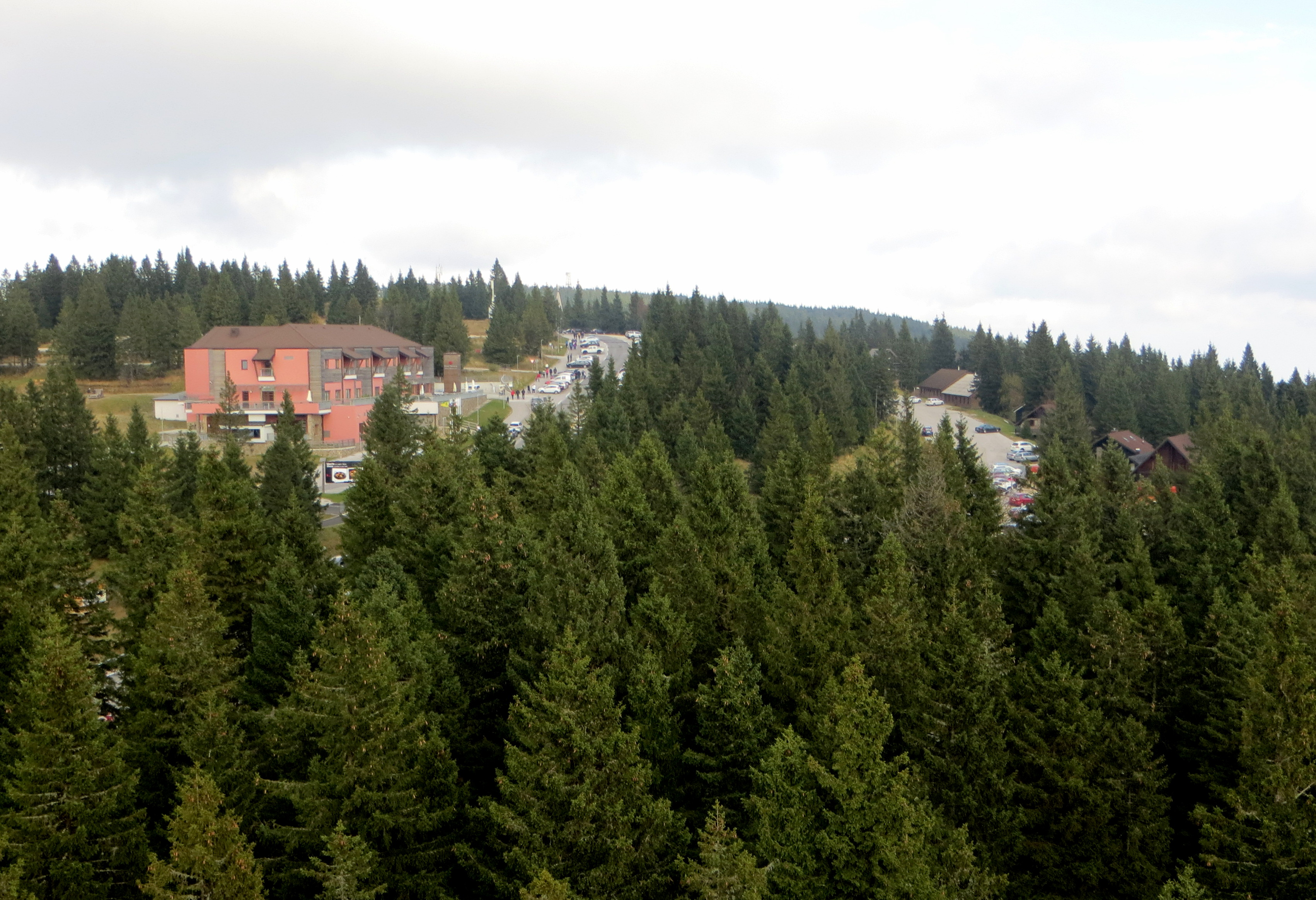
Hotel Natura

Season	No. of skiers	Skiing days	Rank (visitors)
2009/10	185,000	111	—
2012/13	173,000	122	—
2013/14	151,000	127	1
2014/15	177,000	118	1
2015/16	186,968	132	1
2016/17	188,528	120	1
2017/18	202,230	123	2
2018/19	209,617	126	2
2019/20	150,000	121	N/A

== Accommodation ==
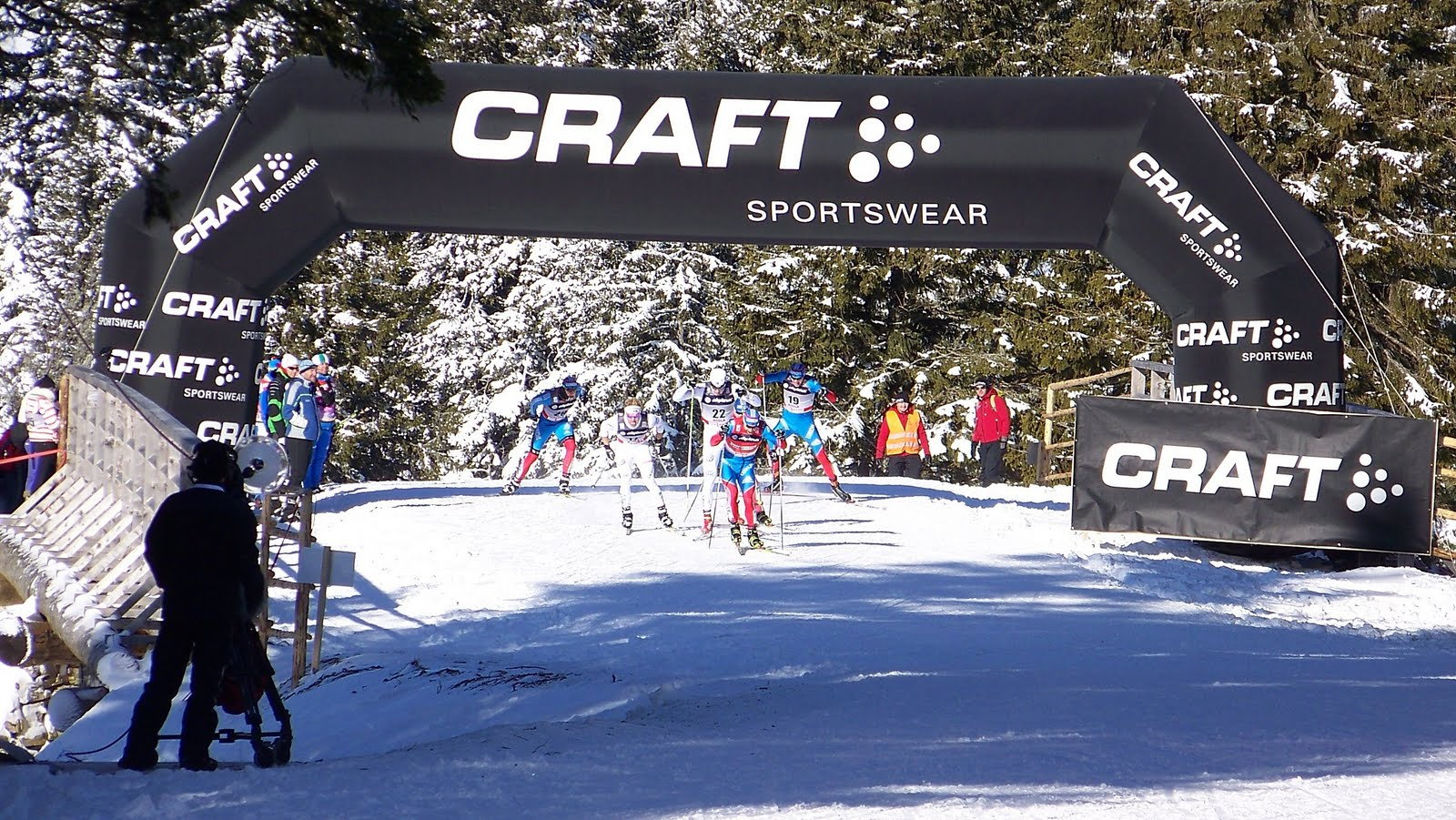
Cross-Country Skiing World Cup 2011

- Planja Hotel****
- Natura Hotel****
- Rogla Hotel***
- Brinje Hotel***
- Jurgovo Hut Suits***
- Rogla and Gaber Bungalows***
- Jelka Youth Hostel*
- Pesek Hut*

== Outdoor activities ==
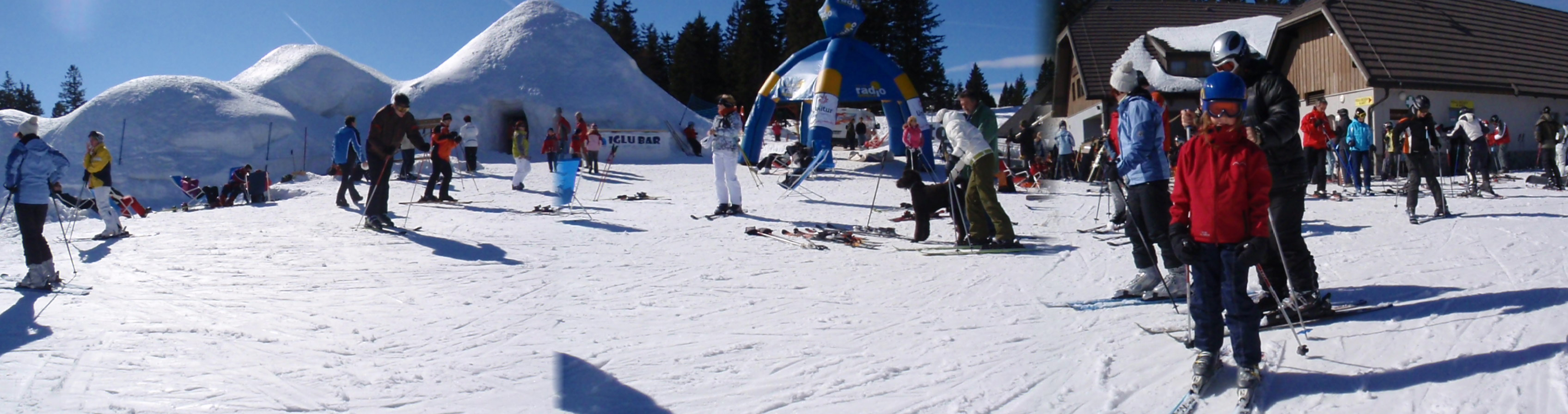
Rogla Eskimo Village

- Dog sledding
- Summer mountain bike downhill
- Rogla Fun Park - Mašinžaga (terrain park)
- Zlodejevo alpine coaster — 1360 m — 40 km/h (year round)
- Old 30 m steel watch tower at the top (1517 m); opened in 1956
- 37 m wooden Canopy Trail (Pot med krošnjami); opened in 2019
- 60 m long spiral dry slide around 37 m high watch tower (opened in 2020)

== Road access ==
- Motorway (Slovenia) — Maribor to Ljubljana (section) — Slovenske Konjice / Tepanje gas station (exit) — Slovenske Konjice — Zreče — Rogla

== World Cup ==
=== Cross-country skiing ===
Date	G	Event	Winner	Second	Third
19 December 2009	M	Sprint C	(Norway) Petter Northug	(Germany) Tobias Angerer	(Sweden) Jesper Modin
20 December 2009	M	30 km C Mass	(Norway) Petter Northug	(Russia) Alexander Legkov	(Russia) Maxim Vylegzhanin
17 December 2011	M	Sprint F	(Norway) Petter Northug	(Switzerland) Dario Cologna	(Kazakhstan) Alexey Poltoranin
18 December 2011	M	15 km C Mass	(Norway) Petter Northug	(Russia) Alexander Legkov	(Russia) Maxim Vylegzhanin

Date	G	Event	Winner	Second	Third
19 December 2009	L	Sprint C	(Norway) Marit Bjørgen	(Poland) Justyna Kowalczyk	(Slovenia) Petra Majdič
20 December 2009	L	15 km C Mass	(Poland) Justyna Kowalczyk	(Norway) Marit Bjørgen	(Sweden) Anna Haag
17 December 2011	L	Sprint C	(Poland) Justyna Kowalczyk	(Norway) Therese Johaug	(Norway) Vibeke Skofterud
18 December 2011	L	15 km C Mass	(Norway) M. Caspersen Falla	(Canada) Chandra Crawford	(Sweden) Ida Ingemarsdotter

=== Snowboard ===
Date	G	Event	Winner	Second	Third
8 February 2013	M	Parallel GS	(Italy) Roland Fischnaller	(Slovenia) Žan Košir	(France) Sylvain Dufour
18 January 2014	M	Parallel GS	(Austria) Lukas Mathies	(Slovenia) Žan Košir	(France) Sylvain Dufour
31 January 2015	M	Parallel GS	(Russia) Vic Wild	(Italy) Mirko Felicetti	(Slovenia) Žan Košir
23 January 2016	M	Parallel GS	(Russia) Andrey Sobolev	(Bulgaria) Radoslav Yankov	(Russia) Vic Wild
28 January 2017	M	Parallel GS	(Switzerland) Nevin Galmarini	(Bulgaria) Radoslav Yankov	(Slovenia) Žan Košir
20 January 2018	M	Parallel GS	(Austria) A. Prommegger	(Italy) Edwin Coratti	(Austria) Benjamin Karl
21 January 2018	M	Parallel GS	(Austria) Benjamin Karl	(Bulgaria) Radoslav Yankov	(Italy) Roland Fischnaller
19 January 2019	M	Parallel GS	(Italy) Edwin Coratti	(Italy) Daniele Bagozza	(Slovenia) Rok Marguč
18 January 2020	M	Parallel GS	(Italy) Edwin Coratti	(Italy) Roland Fischnaller	(Russia) Vic Wild

Date	G	Event	Winner	Second	Third
8 February 2013	L	Parallel GS	(Russia) Y. Tudegesheva	(Netherlands) Nicolien Sauerbreij	(Austria) Claudia Riegler
18 January 2014	L	Parallel GS	(Czech Republic) Ester Ledecká	(Japan) Tomoka Takeuchi	(Austria) Julia Dujmovits
31 January 2015	L	Parallel GS	(Austria) Marion Kreiner	(Austria) Ina Meschik	(Germany) Selina Jörg
23 January 2016	L	Parallel GS	(Czech Republic) Ester Ledecká	(Austria) Marion Kreiner	(Russia) Y. Tudegesheva
28 January 2017	L	Parallel GS	(Czech Republic) Ester Ledecká	(Germany) Carolin Langenhorst	(Austria) Ina Meschik
20 January 2018	L	Parallel GS	(Czech Republic) Ester Ledecká	(Austria) Claudia Riegler	(Austria) Julia Dujmovits
21 January 2018	L	Parallel GS	(Germany) R. T. Hofmeister	(Austria) Sabine Schöffmann	(Russia) Alena Zavarzina
19 January 2019	L	Parallel GS	(Germany) Selina Jörg	(Russia) Natalia Soboleva	(Germany) Cheyenne Loch
18 January 2020	L	Parallel GS	(Czech Republic) Ester Ledecká	(Germany) R. T. Hofmeister	(Russia) Natalia Soboleva

== See also ==
- List of ski areas and resorts in Slovenia
