= Snowboarding at the 2019 Winter Universiade =

Snowboarding at the XXIX Winter Universiade
- Dates: 2–10 March 2019

Snowboarding at the 2019 Winter Universiade was held at the Sopka Cluster from 3 to 10 March 2019.

== Men's events ==
Event	Gold		Silver		Bronze	
Snowboard cross	(Canada) Will Malisch		(Russia) Daniil Dilman		(Japan) Yoshiki Takahara	
Parallel giant slalom	(Poland) Oskar Kwiatkowski		(Poland) Michał Nowaczyk		(Russia) Dmitry Sarsembaev	
Parallel slalom	(Russia) Dmitry Sarsembaev		(Russia) Dmitrii Karlagachev		(South Korea) Lee Sang-ho	
Halfpipe	(Russia) Nikita Avtaneev	95.50	(South Korea) Kweon Lee-jun	92.75	(Finland) Axel Thelen	85.50
Slopestyle	(Russia) Anton Mamaev	95.00	(Russia) Vlad Khadarin	92.00	(Finland) Axel Thelen	89.25

== Women's events ==
Event	Gold		Silver		Bronze	
Snowboard cross	(Russia) Kristina Paul		(Russia) Aleksandra Parshina		(Canada) Audrey McManiman	
Parallel giant slalom	(South Korea) Jeong Hae-rim		(Russia) Milena Bykova		(Russia) Natalia Soboleva	
Parallel slalom	(Russia) Milena Bykova		(Russia) Natalia Soboleva		(South Korea) Jeong Hae-rim	
Halfpipe	(Japan) Kurumi Imai	89.25	(China) Qiu Leng	83.50	(China) Wu Shaotong	70.50
Slopestyle	(Russia) Elena Kostenko	76.75	(Russia) Anastasia Loginova	71.25	(Russia) Ekaterina Kosova	68.75

== Medal table ==
* Host nation (Russia)

Rank	Nation	Gold	Silver	Bronze	Total
1	Russia*	6	7	3	16
2	South Korea	1	1	2	4
3	Poland	1	1	0	2
4	Canada	1	0	1	2
4	Japan	1	0	1	2
6	China	0	1	1	2
7	Finland	0	0	2	2
Totals (7 entries)		10	10	10	30
