= Onokivtsi =

Onokivtsi Оноківці
- Village
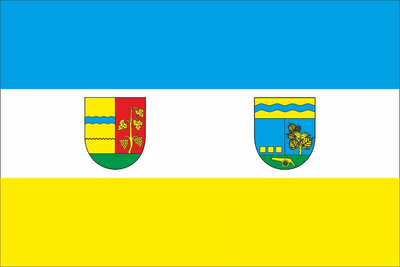
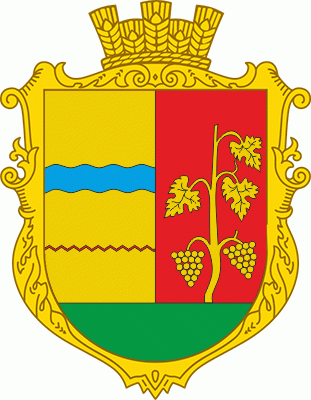
- Flag Coat of arms
- Interactive map of Onokivtsi
- Location within Ukraine Location within Zakarpattia Oblast
- Coordinates: 48°39′15″N 22°20′30″E
- Country: Ukraine
- Oblast: Zakarpattia Oblast
- District: Uzhhorod Raion
- Foundation: 1412

Population
  - Total: 2 187
- Time zone: UTC+2 (EET)
  - Summer (DST): UTC+3 (EEST)
- Postal code: 89412
- Website: Onokivtsi Information Center

Onokivtsi (Ukrainian: Оноківці; Hungarian: Felsődomonya) is a village in Uzhhorod Raion (district) of Zakarpattia Oblast (province) in western Ukraine. The village's population is 2,187.

The village belonged in the 14th-17th centuries to the noble Drugeth family from the Kingdom of Hungary. The population there was mixed, there lived Slovaks and Rusins. In 1946 Slovaks moved to Czechoslovakia according to an agreement with the Soviet Union.

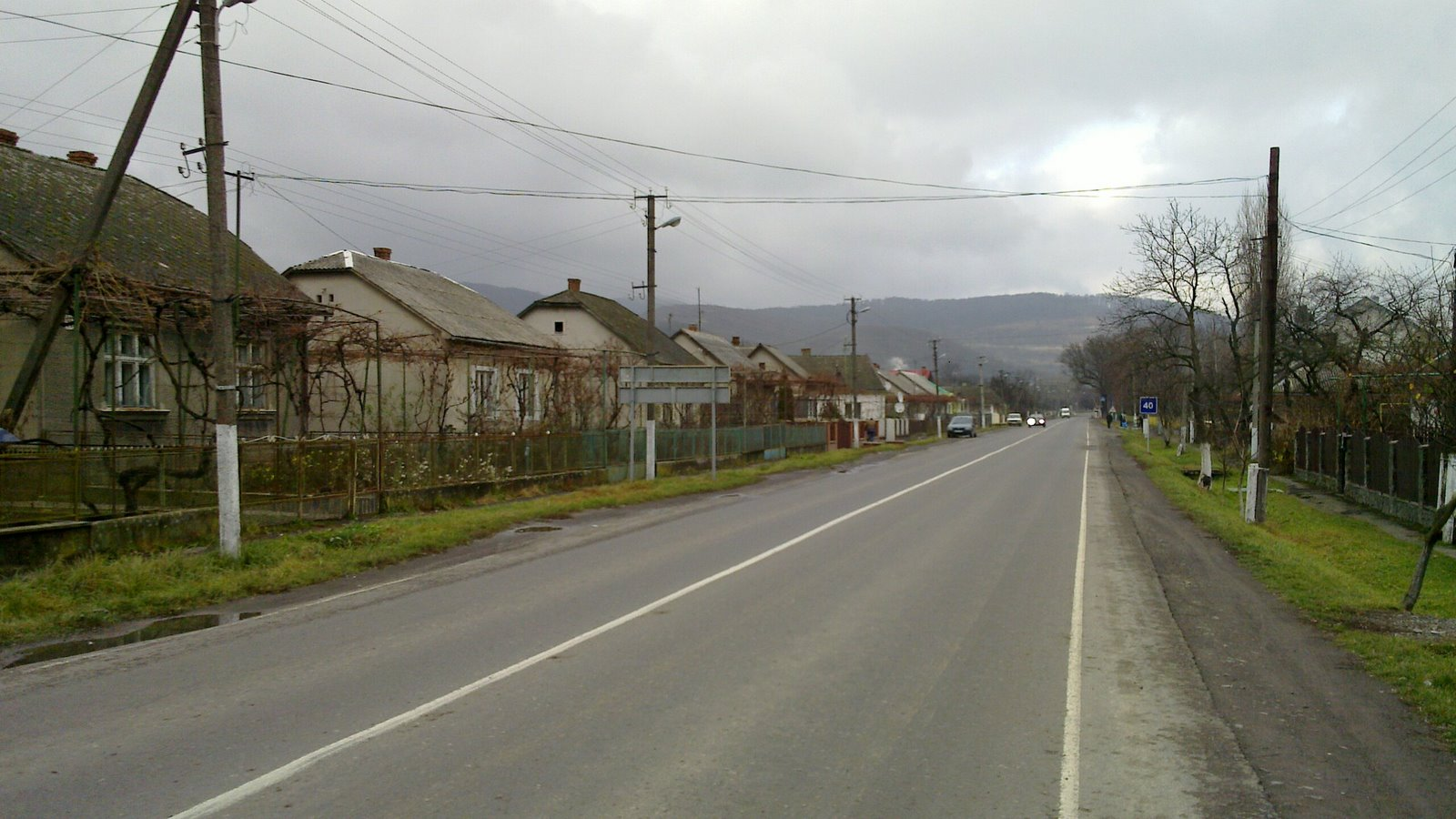
One of the streets in Onokivtsi

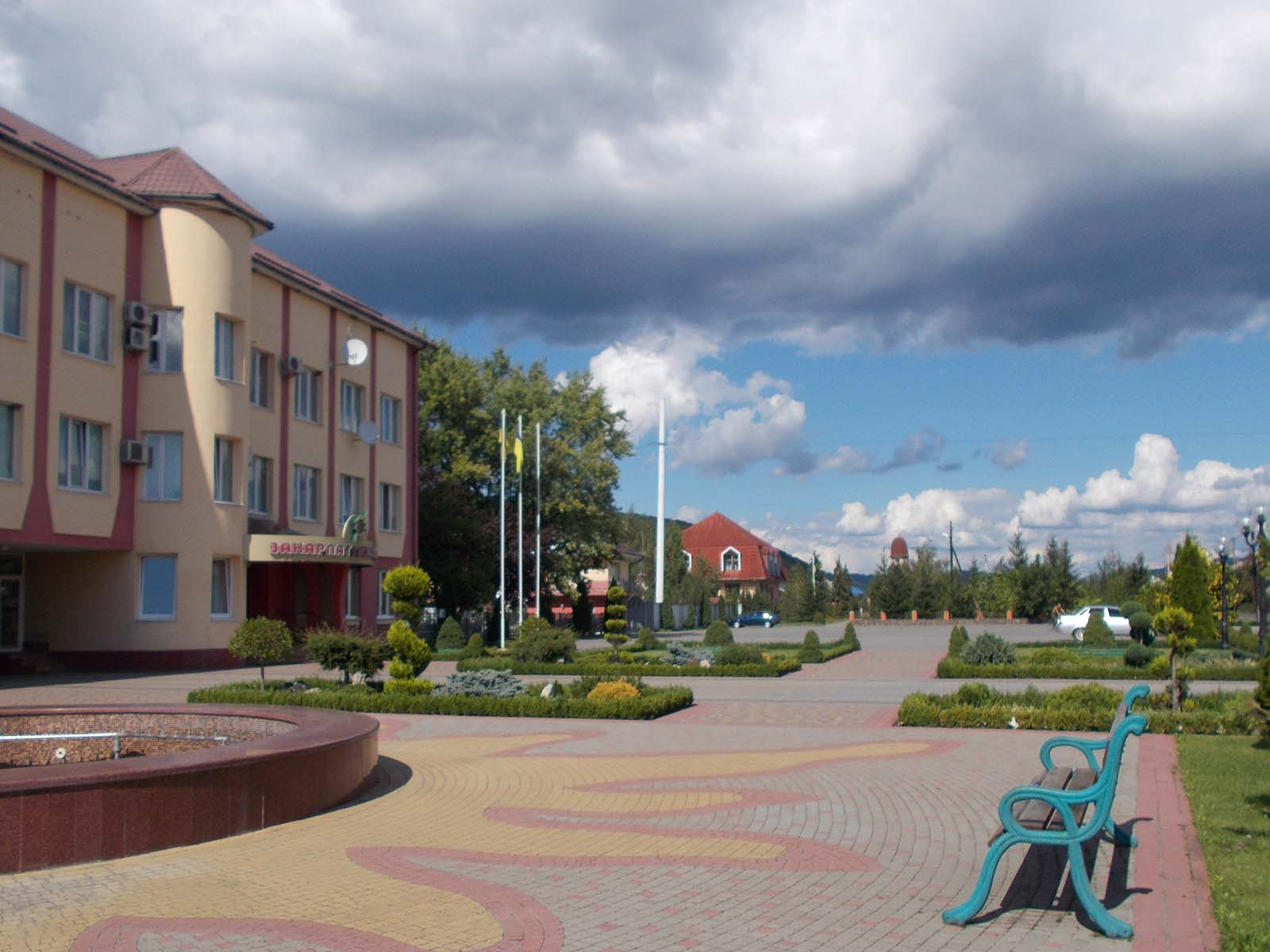
Zakarpatiaoblenergo

== Famous people ==
- Annamari Dancha - Ukrainian snowboarder, 2019 World silver medalist, three-time Olympic participant
