= Annamari Dancha =

Ukrainian snowboarder (born 1990)

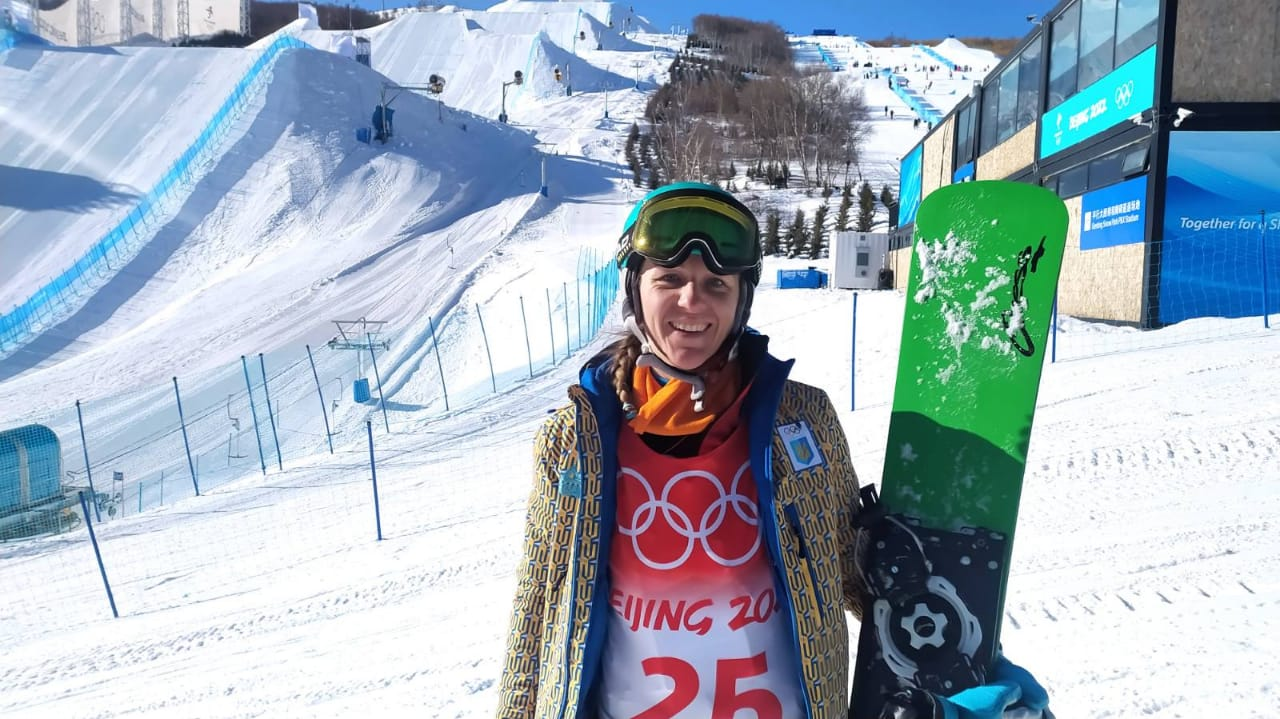
- Chundak in 2022

Personal information
- Full name: Данча Аннамарі Михайлівна
- Nationality: Ukrainian
- Born: 26 March 1990 (age 36) Onokivtsi, Uzhhorod Raion, Zakarpattia Oblast, Ukrainian SSR, Soviet Union
- Height: 1.65 m (5 ft 5 in)
- Weight: 57 kg (126 lb)

Sport
- Country: Ukraine
- Sport: Snowboarding
- Event(s): Parallel slalom, parallel giant slalom
- Club: "Spartak" (Uzhhorod)
Medal record
Women's snowboarding
Representing Ukraine
World Championships
Silver medal – second place	2019 Utah	Parallel slalom
Junior World Championships
Gold medal – first place	2010 Otago	Parallel GS
Universiade
Silver medal – second place	2011 Erzurum	Parallel GS
Silver medal – second place	2017 Almaty	Parallel GS

Annamari Dancha (née Annamari Chundak; Ukrainian: Данча Аннамарі Михайлівна; born 26 March 1990 in Onokivtsi, Ukrainian SSR) is a Ukrainian snowboarder, specializing in alpine snowboarding. She is silver medalist of the 2019 World championships in parallel slalom. She competed at the 2010, 2014 and 2018 Winter Olympics for Ukraine.

== Career ==
Annamari Chundak made her World Cup debut in October 2006. Until 2010 Winter Olympics, she managed to qualify for the knockout stage only once – on 6 February 2010, in German Sudelfeld, where she was 14th. She competed at the 2007 European Youth Olympic Winter Festival in Spanish Jaca, where she was 4th in giant slalom and 6th in parallel giant slalom.

At the 2010 Winter Olympics, she surprisingly qualified 16th in the parallel giant slalom, but lost in the round of 16 to Marion Kreiner, finishing 16th. Later that year, she became junior world champion in the parallel giant slalom in Snow Park, New Zealand. She is also a two-time silver medalist in parallel giant slalom at the Winter Universiades: in 2011 in Turkish Erzurum and 2017 in Kazakh Almaty. At the 2013 Winter Universiade, she achieved 7th rank in the parallel giant slalom competition.

At the 2014 Winter Olympics, she was 21st in the qualifying run of the parallel giant slalom and 21st in the parallel slalom, not advancing in either event.

In January 2015, she married and took a two-year pause in competing.

Before the 2022 Winter Games, her best finish was 8th in a parallel giant slalom in Bulgarian Bansko in the 2017–18 season. That season was quite successful for her: 1 finish in Top-8 and four more finishes in Top-16. She qualified to represent Ukraine at the 2018 Winter Olympics in Pyeongchang. In parallel giant slalom, she finished 28th, which was last place due to her disastrous first run.

In February 2019, she ranked 6th in the parallel giant slalom event at the World Championships, which was the best ever result for Ukraine at snowboarding competitions of the highest level. But the next day, she surprised everybody by winning a silver medal in parallel slalom, which was the first-ever medal for Ukraine at international snowboard competitions of the highest level. She was just 15th in the qualifying round after finishing 21st on the blue course and 8th on the red course. In the first round, she defeated #2 of the qualification, Cheyenne Loch, from Germany. Later on, Dancha won against Polish Aleksandra Król and 2018 Winter Olympics bronze medalist German Ramona Theresia Hofmeister. In the final, she lost to Julie Zogg from Switzerland, thus winning the silver medal. Interesting fact that these athletes met each other in the final for the second time. Nine years ago, Dancha (Chundak back then) won against Zogg in the final of the parallel giant slalom at the Junior World Championships.

As of January 2022, her best World Cup finish was 5th in the parallel giant slalom on January 11, 2020, in Swiss Scuol.

In 2022, Dancha was nominated for her fourth Winter Games in Beijing.

== Career results ==
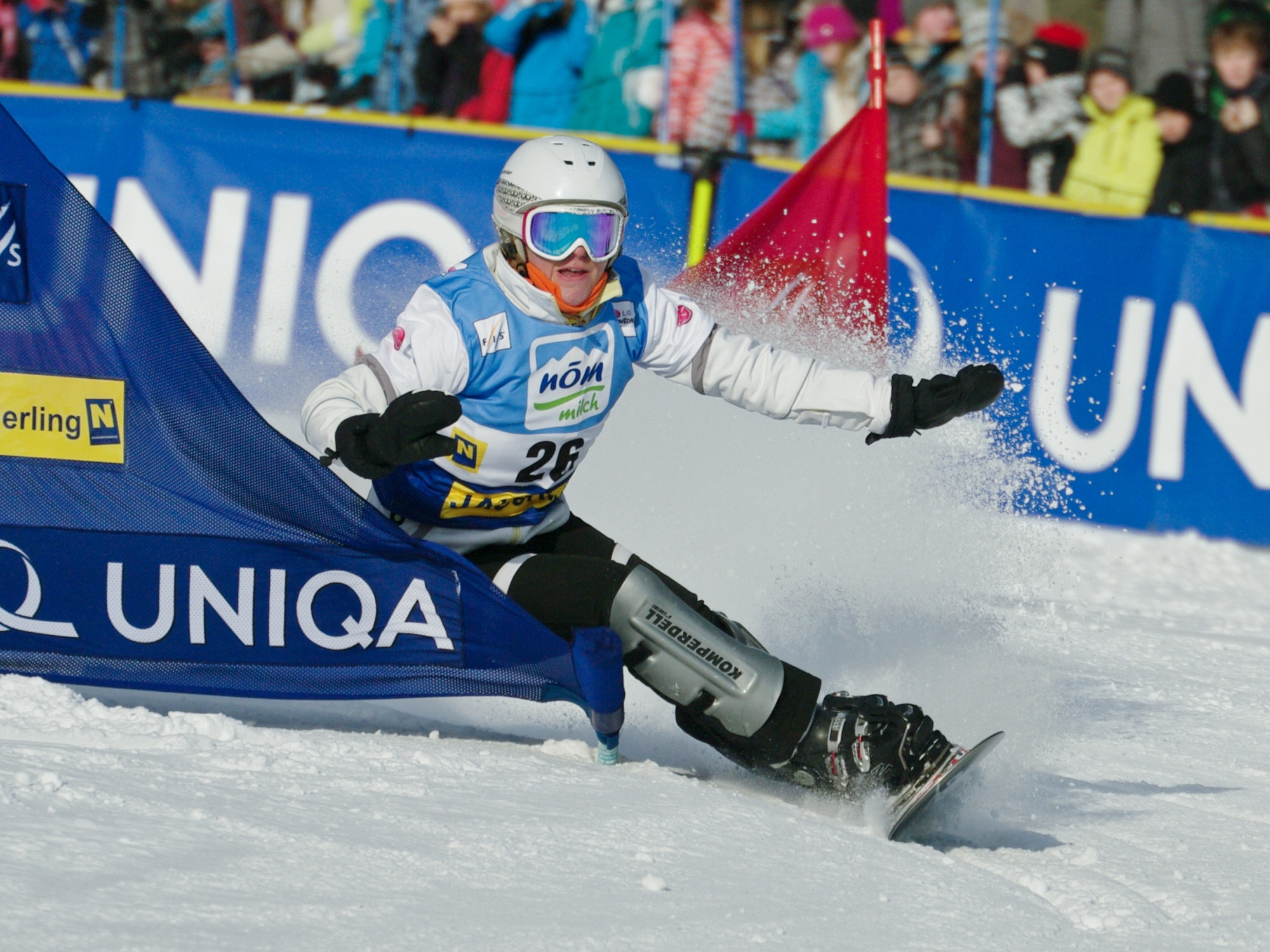
Annamari Dancha competing in 2012 at the World Cup in Jauerling

=== Winter Olympics ===
Year	Place	PGS	PSL
2010	Vancouver, Canada	16	—N/a
2014	Sochi, Russia	21	21
2018	Pyeongchang, South Korea	28	—N/a
2022	Beijing, China	26	—N/a
2026	(Italy) Milano Cortina	29	—N/a

=== World Championships ===
Year	Place	PGS	PSL
2007	Arosa, Switzerland	51	46
2009	Gangwon, South Korea	25	15
2011	La Molina, Spain	17	15
2013	Stoneham, Canada	25	31
2017	Sierra Nevada, Spain	32	17
2019	Utah, United States	6	2
2021	Rogla, Slovenia	26	19

=== World Cup ===
==== Rankings ====
Season	PAR	PGS	PSL	Overall
2006–07	67	-	-	144
2007–08	43	-	-	111
2008–09	37	-	-	108
2009–10	32	-	-	77
2010–11	22	-	-	-
2011–12	28	-	-	-
2012–13	27	28	17	-
2013–14	31	28	33	-
2014–15	missed			
2015–16	missed			
2016–17	36	34	32	-
2017–18	21	20	20	-
2018–19	27	26	29	-
2019–20	18	16	22	-
2020–21	27	29	23	-

=== European Cup ===
==== Podiums ====
Season	Place	Event	Rank
2008–09	Isola 2000, France	PGS	1
2009–10	Vrátna, Slovakia	PGS	3
2009–10	Kasberg, Austria	PGS	3
2009–10	Kyiv, Ukraine	PSL	1
2009–10	Kyiv, Ukraine	PSL	3
2011–12	Kyiv, Ukraine	PSL	1
2012–13	Ratschings, Italy	PSL	2
2020–21	Lenzerheide, Switzerland	PSL	1
2020–21	Lenzerheide, Switzerland	PSL	3
2021–22	Bukovel, Ukraine	PGS	1

=== Nor-Am Cup ===
==== Podiums ====
Season	Place	Event	Rank
2019–20	Blue Mountain, Canada	PSL	3

== Personal life ==
She studied at the Uzhhorod National University. She is married and has a daughter. She speaks English and Hungarian.
