= Sofia Nadyrshina =

Russian snowboarder (born 2003)

Personal information
- Full name: Sofia Valeryevna Nadyrshina
- Nationality: Russia
- Born: 14 May 2003 (age 23) Yuzhno-Sakhalinsk, Russia

Sport
- Sport: Skiing

World Cup career
- Indiv. podiums: 6
- Indiv. wins: 2
- Team podiums: 1
Medal record
Women's snowboarding
Representing Russian Ski Federation
World Championships
Gold medal – first place	2021 Rogla	Parallel slalom
Silver medal – second place	2021 Rogla	Parallel GS
Representing Russia
Junior World Championships
Gold medal – first place	2020 Lachtal	Parallel slalom
Gold medal – first place	2020 Lachtal	Parallel GS
Gold medal – first place	2020 Lachtal	Parallel team
Gold medal – first place	2021 Krasnoyarsk	Parallel GS
Gold medal – first place	2021 Krasnoyarsk	Parallel slalom
Gold medal – first place	2021 Krasnoyarsk	Parallel team
Silver medal – second place	2019 Rogla	Parallel GS
Silver medal – second place	2019 Rogla	Parallel team

Sofia Valeryevna Nadyrshina (Russian: София Валерьевна Надыршина; born 14 May 2003) is a Russian snowboarder. She is a world champion and a threefold junior world champion. On 9 January 2021, she won her first FIS World Cup title in Parallel Giant Slalom in Scuol.

At the 2021 World Championships, Nadyrshina won two medals: silver in Parallel Giant Slalom and gold in Parallel Slalom. At the age of 17, she became the youngest World Champion in the latter discipline.

== World cup podiums ==
=== Individual podiums ===
- 3 wins – (1 PS, 2 PGS)
- 7 podiums – (2 PS, 5 PGS)

Season	Date	Location	Discipline	Place
2019–20	11 January 2020	Scuol, Switzerland	Parallel GS	2nd
2019–20	1 March 2020	Blue Mountain, Canada	Parallel GS	2nd
2020–21	9 January 2021	Scuol, Switzerland	Parallel GS	1st
2020–21	12 January 2021	Bad Gastein, Austria	Parallel Slalom	1st
2020–21	30 January 2021	Moscow, Russia	Parallel Slalom	2nd
2020–21	6 March 2021	Rogla, Slovenia	Parallel GS	2nd
2021–22	11 December 2021	Lake Bannoye, Russia	Parallel GS	1st

=== Team podiums ===
- 1 podium – (1 PSL_{M})

Season	Date	Location	Discipline	Place	Teammate(s)
2020–21	12 January 2021	Bad Gastein, Austria	Parallel Slalom Team	3rd	Dmitry Loginov
