= Lynn Ott =

American snowboarder

Lynn Ott (born in Pittsburgh, 1967) is an American snowboarder.

She has made 16 FIS Snowboard World Championship starts in events including Parallel Giant Slalom, Parallel Slalom, Snowboardcross, and Halfpipe. She has made 202 FIS Snowboard World Cup starts including a snowboardcross podium finish in 1996.

She has never qualified for the Olympics, but nearly did so in 2006 and 2010.

In 2019, Ott captured the National Championship title, winning Gold in the giant slalom at the age of 51.
