= FIS Freestyle Ski and Snowboarding World Championships 2019 =

2019 edition of the FIS Freestyle Ski and Snowboarding World Championships

- Host city: Utah
- Country: United States
- Events: 28
- Opening: February 1, 2019
- Closing: February 10, 2019
- Website: Utah 2019

The 2019 FIS Freestyle Ski and Snowboarding World Championships was held in Utah, in resorts Park City, Deer Valley and Solitude Mountain, from February 1 to 10, 2019.

19-year-old Dmitry Loginov of Russia became the youngest World Champion in Parallel Giant Slalom and the only snowboarder to win back-to-back events (parallel slalom and parallel giant slalom) in both junior and senior championships.

== Schedule ==
28 events were held.

Q	Qualification	F	Final

Event↓/Date →	Thu 31	Fri 1	Sat 2		Sun 3	Mon 4		Tue 5		Wed 6		Thu 7	Fri 8		Sat 9	Sun 10
Freestyle skiing
Ski cross		Q	F													
Big air			Q	F												
Slopestyle										Q	F					
Aerials								Q		F						
Team Aerials												F				
Moguls													Q	F		
Halfpipe												Q			F	
Dual moguls															F	
Snowboarding
Snowboard cross	Q	F														
Snowboard cross team					F											
Parallel giant slalom						Q	F									
Parallel slalom								Q	F							
Halfpipe										Q			F			
Slopestyle															Q	F

== Medalists ==
=== Medal table ===
* Host nation (United States)

Rank	Nation	Gold	Silver	Bronze	Total
1	United States (USA)*	5	3	6	14
2	Canada (CAN)	3	3	3	9
3	Russia (RUS)	3	2	1	6
4	Switzerland (SUI)	3	1	3	7
5	France (FRA)	3	1	2	6
6	Australia (AUS)	1	2	0	3
7	Great Britain (GBR)	1	1	1	3
8	Germany (GER)	1	0	4	5
9	Belarus (BLR)	1	0	0	1
9	Czech Republic (CZE)	1	0	0	1
9	Estonia (EST)	1	0	0	1
9	Kazakhstan (KAZ)	1	0	0	1
9	New Zealand (NZL)	1	0	0	1
14	Italy (ITA)	0	2	2	4
15	China (CHN)	0	2	1	3
16	Norway (NOR)	0	2	0	2
16	Ukraine (UKR)	0	2	0	2
18	Japan (JPN)	0	1	2	3
19	Austria (AUT)	0	1	0	1
19	Slovenia (SVN)	0	1	0	1
19	Sweden (SWE)	0	1	0	1
Totals (21 entries)		25	25	25	75

=== Freestyle skiing ===
==== Men ====
Event	Gold		Silver		Bronze	
Big air	Fabian Bösch; Switzerland	186.00	Henrik Harlaut; Sweden	184.00	Alex Beaulieu-Marchand; Canada	183.25
Ski cross	François Place; France		Brady Leman; Canada		Kevin Drury; Canada	
Slopestyle	James Woods; Great Britain	86.68	Birk Ruud; Norway	85.40	Nick Goepper; United States	85.18
Aerials	Maxim Burov; Russia	130.09	Oleksandr Abramenko; Ukraine	126.24	Noé Roth; Switzerland	125.22
Moguls	Mikaël Kingsbury; Canada	84.89	Matt Graham; Australia	81.94	Daichi Hara; Japan	81.66
Halfpipe	Aaron Blunck; United States	94.20	Kevin Rolland; France	93.80	Noah Bowman; Canada	91.60
Dual moguls	Mikaël Kingsbury; Canada		Bradley Wilson; United States		Daichi Hara; Japan	

==== Women ====
Event	Gold		Silver		Bronze	
Big air	Tess Ledeux; France	184.75	Julia Krass; United States	173.75	Isabel Atkin; Great Britain	168.75
Ski cross	Marielle Thompson; Canada		Fanny Smith; Switzerland		Alizée Baron; France	
Slopestyle	Cancelled					
Aerials	Aliaksandra Ramanouskaya; Belarus	113.18	Liubov Nikitina; Russia	89.88 (T 17.7)	Xu Mengtao; China	89.88 (T 17.0)
Moguls	Yulia Galysheva; Kazakhstan	79.14	Jakara Anthony; Australia	78.99	Perrine Laffont; France	78.70
Halfpipe	Kelly Sildaru; Estonia	95.00	Cassie Sharpe; Canada	94.40	Brita Sigourney; United States	90.60
Dual moguls	Perrine Laffont; France		Jaelin Kauf; United States		Tess Johnson; United States	

==== Mixed ====
Event	Gold		Silver		Bronze	
Team aerials	Switzerland; Carol Bouvard; Nicolas Gygax; Noé Roth	303.08	China; Xu Mengtao; Sun Jiaxu; Wang Xindi	297.82	Russia; Liubov Nikitina; Stanislav Nikitin; Maxim Burov	296.74

=== Snowboarding ===
==== Men ====
Event	Gold		Silver		Bronze	
Snowboard cross	Mick Dierdorff; United States		Hanno Douschan; Austria		Emanuel Perathoner; Italy	
Parallel giant slalom	Dmitry Loginov; Russia		Tim Mastnak; Slovenia		Stefan Baumeister; Germany	
Parallel slalom	Dmitry Loginov; Russia		Roland Fischnaller; Italy		Stefan Baumeister; Germany	
Big air	Cancelled					
Halfpipe	Scotty James; Australia	97.50	Yūto Totsuka; Japan	92.25	Patrick Burgener; Switzerland	91.25
Slopestyle (Note: The slopestyle finals were cancelled due to weather conditions and the qualification results were used to determine the final ranking.)	Chris Corning; United States	93.25	Mark McMorris; Canada	93.00	Judd Henkes; United States	90.50

==== Women ====
Event	Gold		Silver		Bronze	
Snowboard cross	Eva Samková; Czech Republic		Charlotte Bankes; Great Britain		Michela Moioli; Italy	
Parallel giant slalom	Selina Jörg; Germany		Natalia Soboleva; Russia		Ladina Jenny; Switzerland	
Parallel slalom	Julie Zogg; Switzerland		Annamari Dancha; Ukraine		Ramona Theresia Hofmeister; Germany	
Big air	Cancelled					
Halfpipe	Chloe Kim; United States	93.50	Cai Xuetong; China	84.00	Maddie Mastro; United States	82.00
Slopestyle	Zoi Sadowski-Synnott; New Zealand	91.75	Silje Norendal; Norway	88.75	Jamie Anderson; United States	87.25

==== Mixed ====
Event	Gold	Silver	Bronze
Snowboard cross team	United States; Mick Dierdorff; Lindsey Jacobellis	Italy; Omar Visintin; Michela Moioli	Germany; Paul Berg; Hanna Ihedioha
