= Teodora Pentcheva =

Bulgarian snowboarder

Personal information
- Born: 9 July 1982 (age 44)

Sport
- Country: Bulgaria
- Sport: Snowboarding

Teodora Pentcheva (Bulgarian: Теодора Пенчева) (born 9 July 1982) is a Bulgarian snowboarder.

She competed in the 2003, 2005, 2007, 2009, 2011 and 2017 FIS Snowboard World Championships, and in the 2018 Winter Olympics, in parallel giant slalom.
