= Xu Xiaoxiao =

Chinese snowboarder (born 1992)

Personal information
- Born: 24 December 1992 (age 32)

Sport
- Country: China
- Sport: Snowboarding

Xu Xiaoxiao (born 24 December 1992) is a Chinese snowboarder.

She competed in the 2011, 2013 and 2017 FIS Snowboard World Championships, and in the 2018 Winter Olympics, in parallel giant slalom.
