= Megan Farrell =

Canadian snowboarder

Personal information
- Born: 26 February 1992 (age 33); Bracebridge, Ontario Canada

Sport
- Country: Canada
- Sport: Snowboarding
- Event(s): Parallel giant slalom, Parallel slalom

Megan Farrell (born 26 February 1992) is a Canadian snowboarder who competes internationally in the alpine snowboard discipline.

== Career ==
Farrell has competed at three Senior World Championships in 2017, 2019 and 2021. Farrell's best performances came in 2021. In the slalom event, Farrell finished fourth (the best-ever performance by a Canadian), and in the giant slalom event, eighth (tied for the best Canadian performance ever).

In January 2022, Farrell was named to Canada's 2022 Olympic team in the parallel giant slalom event.
