= Zang Ruxin =

Chinese snowboarder (born 1994)

Personal information
- Born: 31 October 1994 (age 30)

Sport
- Country: China
- Sport: Snowboarding

Zang Ruxin (born 31 October 1994) is a Chinese snowboarder.

She competed in the 2015 and 2017 FIS Snowboard World Championships, and in the 2018 Winter Olympics, in parallel giant slalom.
