= Selina Jörg =

German snowboarder (born 1988)

Personal information
- Nationality: German
- Born: 24 January 1988 (age 38) Sonthofen, West Germany
- Height: 1.74 m (5 ft 9 in)
- Weight: 63 kg (139 lb)

Sport
- Country: Germany
- Sport: Snowboarding
- Event: Parallel giant slalom
- Club: SC Sonthofen
Medal record
Representing Germany
Women's snowboarding
Olympic Games
Silver medal – second place	2018 Pyeongchang	Parallel GS
World Championships
Gold medal – first place	2019 Utah	Parallel GS
Gold medal – first place	2021 Rogla	Parallel GS
Bronze medal – third place	2021 Rogla	Parallel slalom
Winter Universiade
Silver medal – second place	2015 Granada	Parallel GS
Bronze medal – third place	2013 Trentino	Parallel GS

Selina Jörg (born 24 January 1988) is a German snowboarder.

She competed in the parallel giant slalom at the 2010 Vancouver Winter Olympics, finishing in fourth position. She subsequently won a bronze medal at the 2013 Winter Universiade in the same discipline.
