= Milena Bykova =

Russian snowboarder (born 1998)

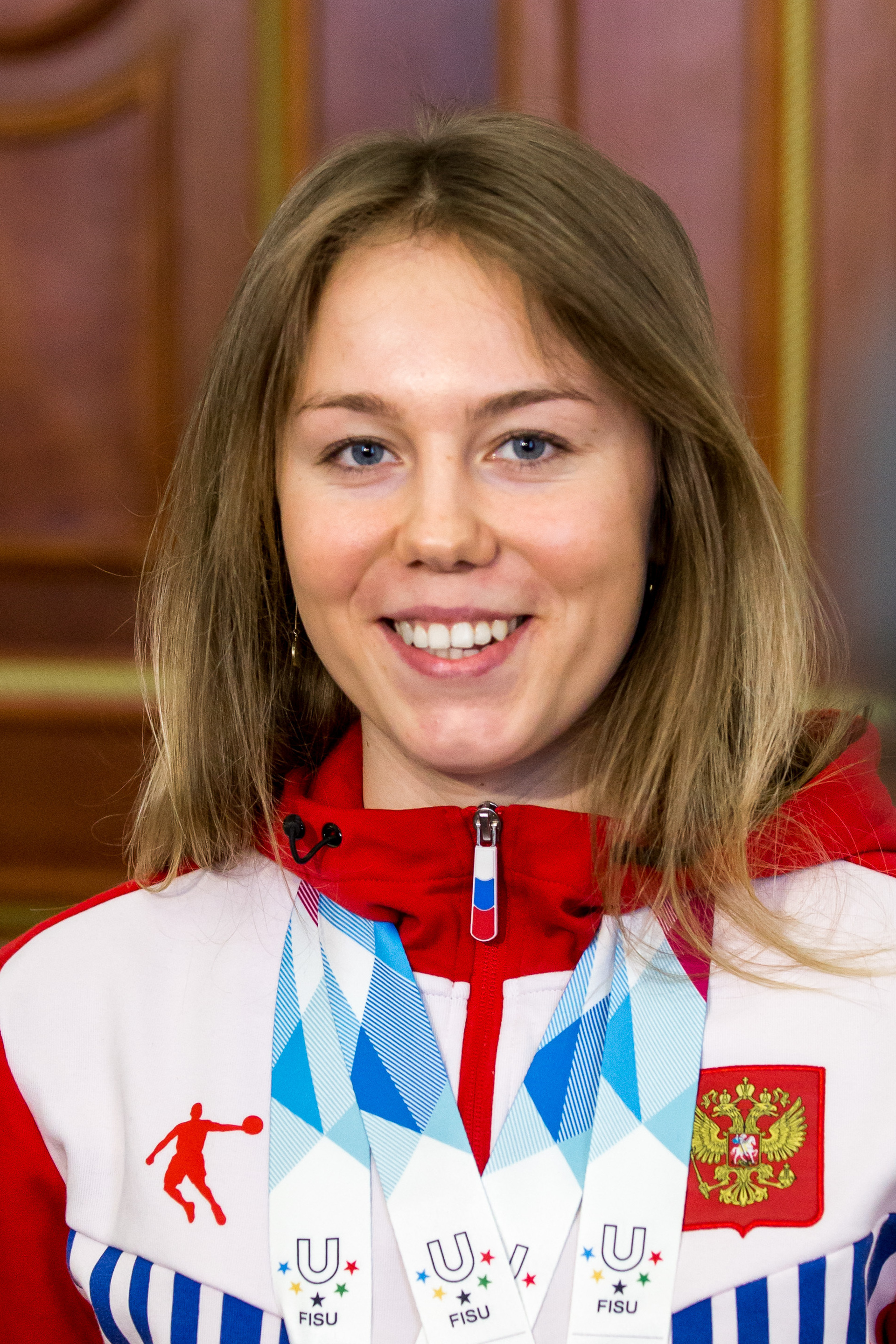
- Bykova in 2019

Personal information
- Nationality: Russia
- Born: 9 January 1998 (age 28) Ufa, Bashkortostan, Russia
Medal record
Representing Russia
Winter Universiade
Gold medal – first place	2019 Krasnoyarsk	Parallel slalom
Silver medal – second place	2019 Krasnoyarsk	Parallel GS

Milena Alexeyevna Bykova (Russian: Милена Алексеевна Быкова; born 9 January 1998 in Ufa) is a Russian snowboarder. She competed in the 2018 Winter Olympics, in parallel giant slalom.

== Career ==
In 2013 she participated in the European Cup for the first time and took 19th place in the parallel giant slalom.

In 2016 she took second place in the parallel slalom at the World Youth Championships. In 2017 – the first.

The second place in the discipline of parallel giant slalom and the first place in parallel slalom at the 2019 Winter Universiade.

== World Cup podiums ==
=== Individual podiums ===
- 2 wins – (2 PGS)
- 3 podiums – (3 PGS)

Season	Date	Location	Discipline	Place
2017–18	3 March 2018	Kayseri, Turkey	Parallel GS	1st
2018–19	9 March 2019	Scuol, Switzerland	Parallel GS	1st
2019–20	11 January 2020	Scuol, Switzerland	Parallel GS	3rd
