= Kaylie Buck =

Canadian snowboarder (born 2000)

Personal information
- Born: 20 February 2000 (age 26) Oakville, Ontario Canada

Sport
- Country: Canada
- Sport: Snowboarding
- Events: Parallel giant slalom, Parallel slalom
Medal record
World Junior Championships
Bronze medal – third place	2020 Lachtal	Parallel Slalom
Bronze medal – third place	2019 Rogla	Parallel team

Kaylie Buck (born February 20, 2000) is a Canadian snowboarder who competes internationally in the alpine snowboard discipline.

== Career ==
At the 2020 FIS Snowboarding Junior World Championships, Buck won bronze in the parallel giant slalom event, becoming the first Canadian woman to win an alpine medal at the event.

Buck has competed at two Senior World Championships in 2019 and 2021.

In January 2022, Buck was initially not named to Canada's 2022 Olympic team. However, after an appeal process, Buck along with three other snowboarders were added to the team in the parallel giant slalom event. Buck finished 21st at the 2022 Olympic Games.

In December 2025, Buck won her first medal at a World Cup event, when she won silver in Cortina.
