= Jennifer Hawkrigg =

Canadian snowboarder (born 1996)

Personal information
- Born: 26 August 1996 (age 29) Toronto, Ontario, Canada

Sport
- Country: Canada
- Sport: Snowboarding
- Event(s): Parallel giant slalom, Parallel slalom

Jennifer Hawkrigg (born 26 August 1996) is a Canadian snowboarder who competes internationally in the alpine snowboard discipline.

== Career ==
Hawkrigg has competed at two Senior World Championships in 2019 and 2021.

In January 2022, Hawkrigg was initially not named to Canada's 2022 Olympic team. However, after an appeal process, Hawkrigg along with three other snowboarders were added to the team in the parallel giant slalom event.
