= Gloria Kotnik =

Slovenian snowboarder (born 1989)

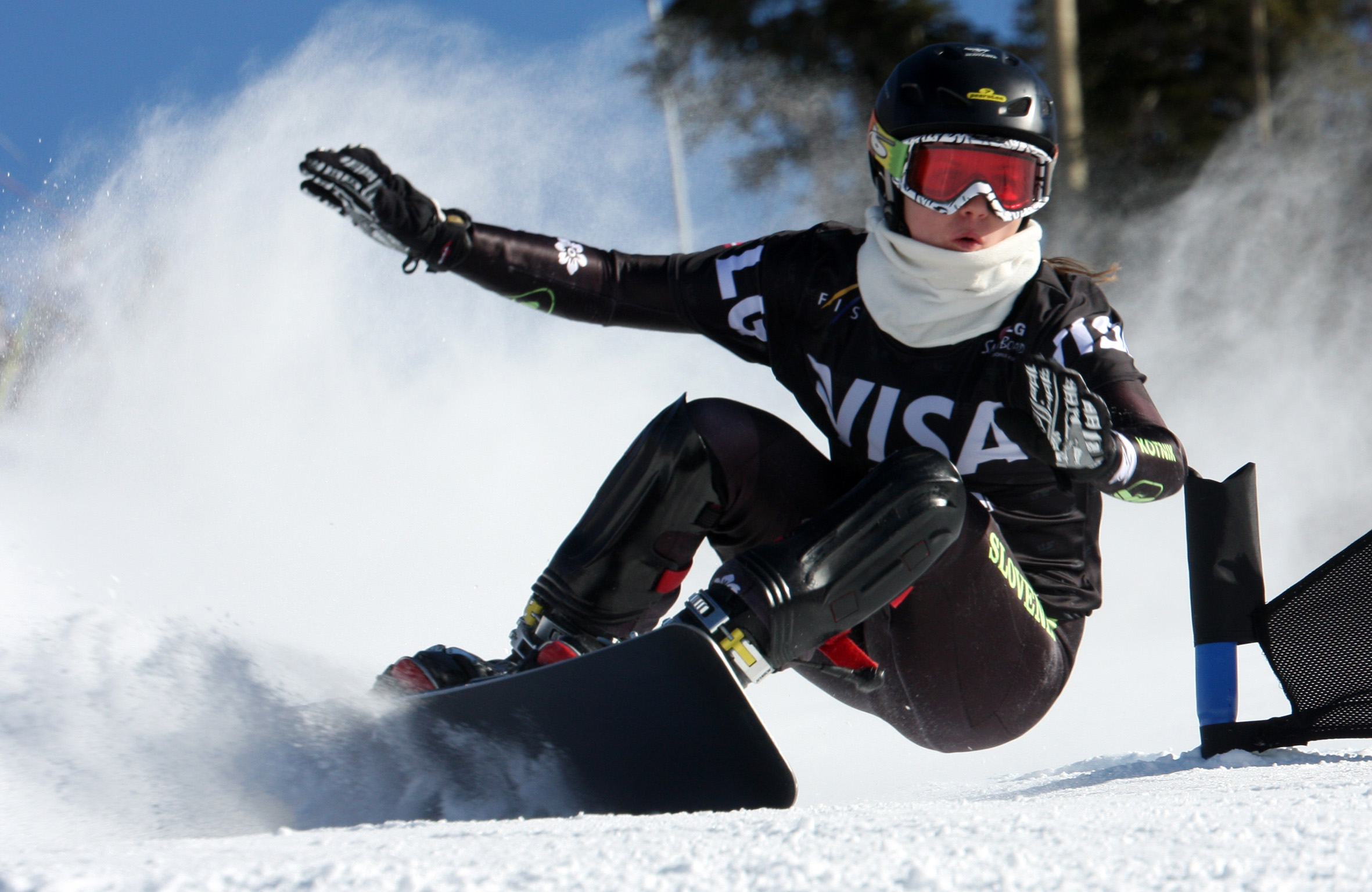
- Kotnik in 2009

Personal information
- Nationality: Slovenia
- Born: 1 June 1989 (age 37) Slovenj Gradec, SFR Yugoslavia
- Height: 1.60 m (5 ft 3 in)

Sport
- Sport: Snowboarding
- Club: Deska Velenje

World Cup career
- Seasons: 2006–2015; 2017–2020; 2022–present
- Indiv. starts: 188
- Indiv. podiums: 1
- Indiv. wins: 1
- Team starts: 14
- Team podiums: 1
Medal record
Women's snowboarding
Representing Slovenia
Olympic Games
Bronze medal – third place	2022 Beijing	Parallel giant slalom
Winter Universiade
Bronze medal – third place	2011 Erzurum	Parallel giant slalom
- Updated on 21 March 2026

Gloria Kotnik (born 1 June 1989) is a Slovenian snowboarder. She competed at the 2010 Winter Olympics, where she finished 27th in parallel giant slalom. At the 2014 Winter Olympics, she finished 24th in parallel giant slalom. At the 2022 Winter Olympics, she won a bronze medal in the women's parallel giant slalom event. This was also her first podium in career as her best results in World Cup competition prior to the 2022 Olympics were three fourth places.

== Winter Olympics results ==
- 1 medal – (1 bronze)

Year	Parallel giant slalom	Parallel slalom
(Canada) 2010 Vancouver	27	—
(Russia) 2014 Sochi	24	23
(South Korea) 2018 Pyeongchang	15	—
(China) 2022 Beijing	3	—
(Italy) 2026 Milano Cortina	17	—

== Personal life ==
Kotnik studied management at University of Primorska. In March 2020, she decided to take a break from competitive sport due to burnout and to focus on family. She gave birth to her son Maj in January 2021, and returned to competing in December 2021.
