= Sabine Payer =

Austrian snowboarder (born 1992)

- Payer in 2026

Personal information
- Nationality: Austrian
- Born: Sabine Schöffmann; 28 July 1992 (age 34) Wolfsberg, Carinthia, Austria
- Height: 1.72 m (5 ft 8 in)
- Weight: 63 kg (139 lb)
- Website: bine-payer.at

Sport
- Country: Austria
- Sport: Snowboarding
- Events: Parallel slalom, parallel giant slalom, snowboard cross
- Club: ASKÖ ESV St. Veit Glan
- Coached by: Ingemar Walder

Achievements and titles
- Highest world ranking: 4th in Parallel World Cup (2015, 2017)
Medal record
Women's snowboarding
Representing Austria
World Cup race podiums
Event	1st	2nd	3rd
Parallel Slalom	3	1	2
Parallel Giant Slalom	0	2	0
Total	3	3	2
Olympic Games
Silver medal – second place	2026 Milano Cortina	Parallel giant slalom
World Championships
Silver medal – second place	2023 Bakuriani	Mixed parallel slalom
Bronze medal – third place	2023 Bakuriani	Parallel slalom
Bronze medal – third place	2025 Engadin	Mixed parallel slalom
Junior World Championships
Gold medal – first place	2009 Nagano	Parallel giant slalom
Gold medal – first place	2010 Snow Park	Parallel slalom
Bronze medal – third place	2009 Nagano	Parallel slalom
Bronze medal – third place	2011 Valmalenco	Parallel slalom
European Youth Olympic Festival
Gold medal – first place	2009 Szczyrk	Snowboard cross
Silver medal – second place	2009 Szczyrk	Parallel giant slalom

Sabine Payer (née Schöffmann; born 28 July 1992) is an Austrian snowboarder specializing in parallel slalom and parallel giant slalom disciplines. She is a junior World champion in both parallel slalom and parallel giant slalom.

== World Cup results ==
All results are sourced from the International Ski Federation (FIS).

=== Season standings ===
Season	Age	Parallel Overall	Parallel Slalom	Parallel Giant Slalom
2009	16	60	—N/a	—N/a
2010	17	77	—N/a	—N/a
2011	18	25	—N/a	—N/a
2012	19	16	—N/a	—N/a
2013	20	20	22	20
2014	21	18	18	18
2015	22	4	2	9
2016	23	10	12	7
2017	24	4	3	13
2018	25	7	8	7

=== Race Podiums ===
- 3 wins – (3 PSL)
- 8 podiums – (6 PSL, 2 PGS)

Season	Date	Location	Discipline	Place
2014–15	18 December 2014	Montafon, Austria	Parallel Slalom	1st
2014–15	1 March 2015	Asahikawa, Japan	Parallel Slalom	2nd
2015–16	8 January 2016	Bad Gastein, Austria	Parallel Slalom	3rd
2015–16	27 February 2016	Kayseri, Turkey	Parallel Giant Slalom	2nd
2016–17	10 January 2017	Bad Gastein, Austria	Parallel Slalom	3rd
2016–17	18 March 2017	Winterberg, Germany	Parallel Slalom	1st
2017–18	16 December 2017	Cortina d'Ampezzo, Italy	Parallel Slalom	1st
2017–18	21 January 2018	Rogla, Slovenia	Parallel Giant Slalom	2nd

== Olympic results ==
Year	Age	Parallel Giant Slalom
(South Korea) 2018 Pyeongchang	25	injured
(Italy) 2026 Milan-Cortina	33	2

== World Championships results ==
Year	Age	Parallel Slalom	Parallel Giant Slalom
(Canada) 2013 Stoneham	20	12	—
(Austria) 2015 Kreischberg	22	14	12
(Spain) 2017 Sierra Nevada	24	10	12
