= Weronika Biela =

Polish snowboarder (born 1991)

Personal information
- Born: 15 September 1991 (age 33); Zakopane, Poland

Sport
- Country: Poland
- Sport: Snowboarding

Weronika Biela (born 15 September 1991) is a Polish snowboarder.

She competed in the 2013, 2015 and 2017 FIS Snowboard World Championships, and in the 2018 Winter Olympics, in parallel giant slalom.
