= Natalia Soboleva =

Russian snowboarder (born 1995)

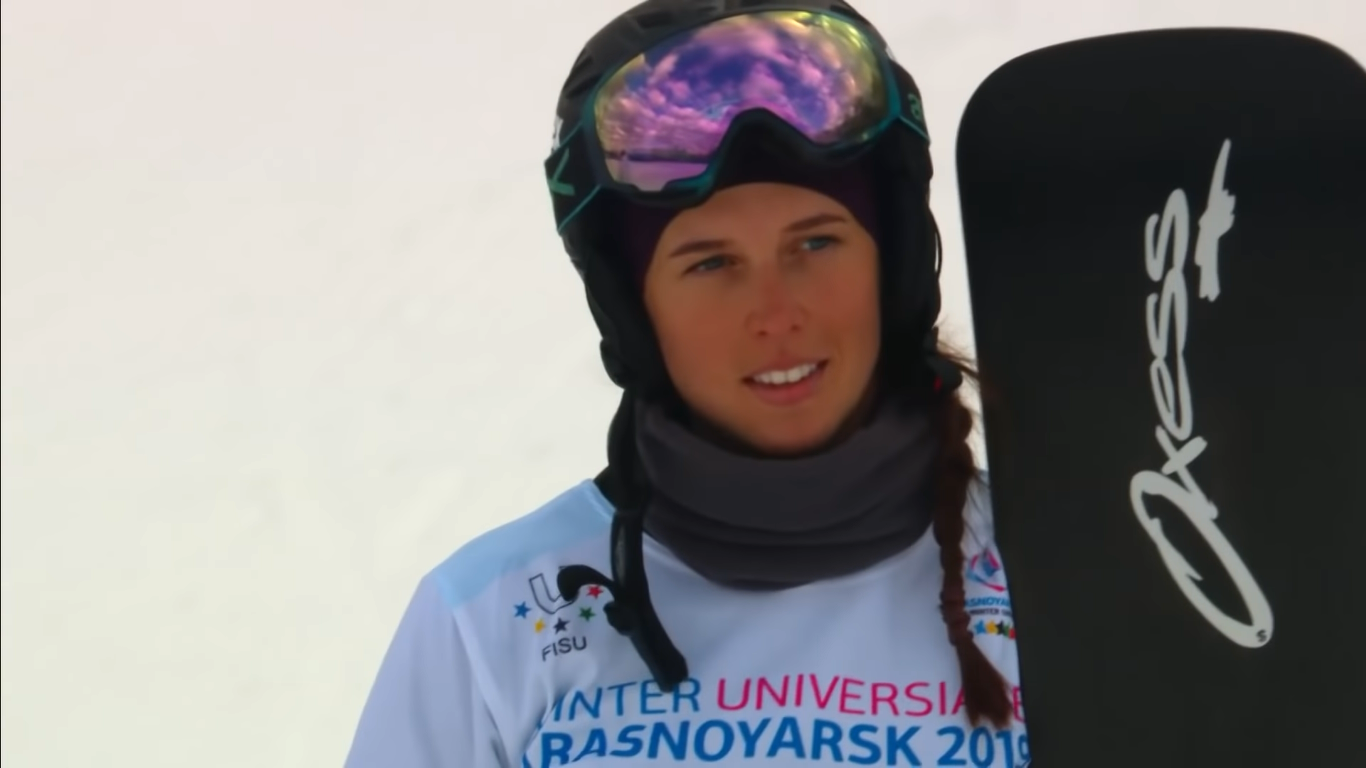
- Soboleva in 2019

Personal information
- Nationality: Russian
- Born: 11 December 1995 (age 30) Tashtagol, Russia
- Height: 1.70 m (5 ft 7 in)
- Weight: 54 kg (119 lb)

Sport
- Country: Russia
- Sport: Snowboarding
- Event: Parallel giant slalom
Medal record
Representing Russia
Women's Snowboarding
World Championships
Silver medal – second place	2019 Utah	Parallel GS
Winter Universiade
Silver medal – second place	2019 Krasnoyarsk	Parallel slalom
Bronze medal – third place	2019 Krasnoyarsk	Parallel GS

Natalia Andreyevna Soboleva (Russian: Ната́лья Андре́евна Со́болева; born 11 December 1995) is a Russian snowboarder, specializing in alpine snowboarding. She is the sister of Olympic snowboarder and 2015 World Champion Andrey Sobolev.

== Career ==
Soboleva competed at the 2014 Winter Olympics for Russia. She was disqualified in the qualifying run of the parallel giant slalom. In the parallel slalom, she qualified 15th, then lost to Ester Ledecka in the 1/8 finals, ending up 15th overall.

As of September 2014, her best showing at the World Championships is 7th, in the 2013 parallel slalom.

Soboleva made her World Cup debut in March 2011. As of September 2014, her best finish is 4th, in a pair of events at Bad Gastein. Her best overall finish is 12th, in 2013–14.

== World Cup podiums ==
=== Individual podiums ===
- 0 wins – (0 PS, 0 PGS)
- 3 podiums – (1 PS, 2 PGS)

Season	Date	Location	Discipline	Place
2017–18	16 December 2017	(Italy) Cortina d'Ampezzo, Italia	Parallel Slalom	3rd
2018–19	26 January 2019	Rogla, Slovenia	Parallel GS	2nd
2019–20	18 January 2020	Rogla, Slovenia	Parallel GS	3rd

=== Team podiums ===
- 1 podium – (1 PSL_{M})

Season	Date	Location	Discipline	Place	Teammate(s)
2018–19	27 January 2019	Moscow, Russia	Parallel Slalom Team	2nd	Andrey Sobolev
