= Ladina Jenny =

Swiss snowboarder (born 1993)

Personal information
- Nationality: Swiss
- Born: 10 June 1993 (age 33) Niederurnen, Switzerland
- Height: 1.70 m (5 ft 7 in)
- Weight: 62 kg (137 lb)

Sport
- Country: Switzerland
- Sport: Snowboarding
- Event: Parallel giant slalom
- Club: Snowboard-Davos
Medal record
Women's snowboarding
Representing Switzerland
World Championships
Silver medal – second place	2023 Bakuriani	Parallel slalom
Bronze medal – third place	2019 Utah	Parallel giant slalom

Ladina Jenny (born 10 June 1993) is a Swiss snowboarder, specializing in alpine snowboarding.

== Career ==
Jenny competed at the 2014 Winter Olympics for Switzerland. She was 12th in the qualifying run of the parallel giant slalom, then lost her 1/8 final to Canada's Marianne Leeson, finishing 14th overall. In the parallel slalom she was 24th in qualifying, not advancing.

Jenny made her World Cup debut in January 2010. As of September 2014, her best finish is 6th, in a parallel slalom at Bad Gastein in 2013–14. Her best overall finish is 19th, in 2013–14.
