= Julie Zogg =

Swiss snowboarder (born 1992)

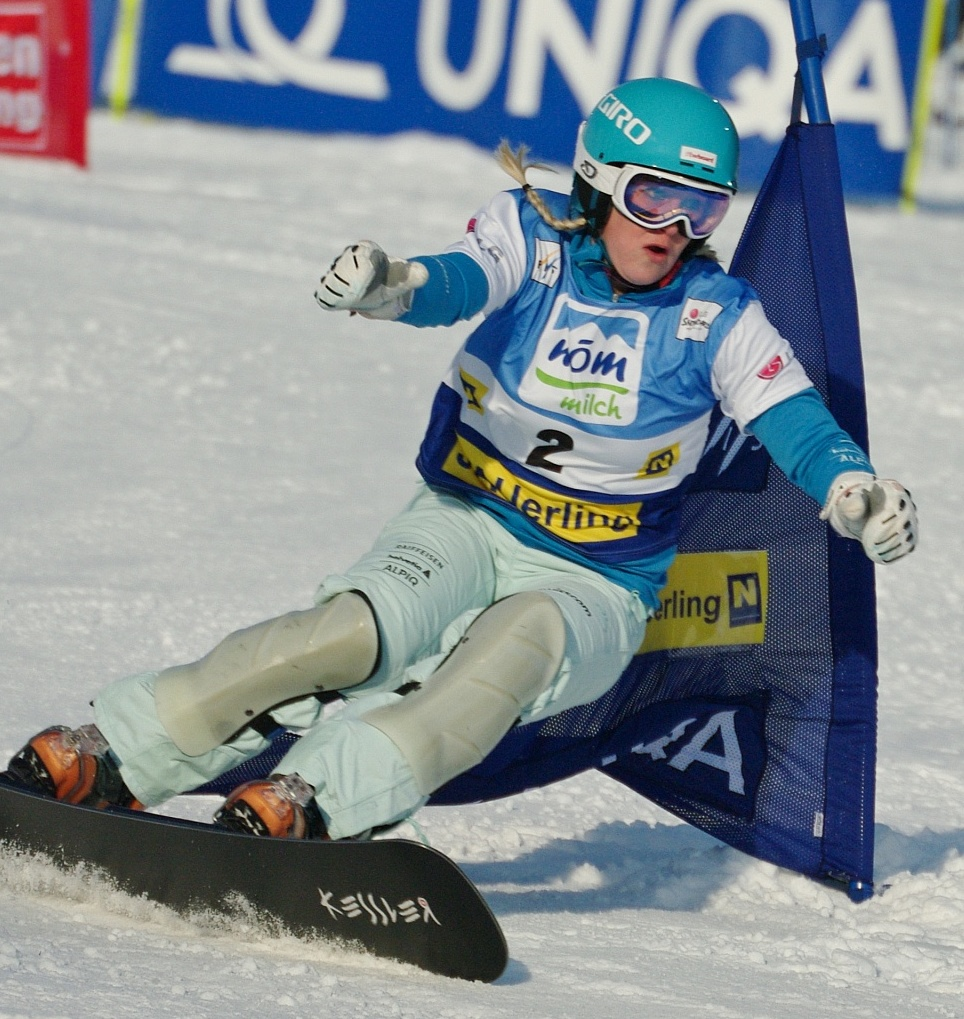
- Zogg in 2012

Personal information
- Nationality: Swiss
- Born: 1 October 1992 (age 33) Walenstadt, Switzerland
- Height: 1.60 m (5 ft 3 in)
- Weight: 57 kg (126 lb)

Sport
- Country: Switzerland
- Sport: Snowboarding
- Event: Parallel slalom
- Club: SC Flumserberg
Medal record
Women's snowboarding
Representing Switzerland
World Championships
Gold medal – first place	2019 Utah	Parallel slalom
Gold medal – first place	2023 Bakuriani	Parallel slalom
Bronze medal – third place	2023 Bakuriani	Mixed parallel slalom

Julie Zogg (born 1 October 1992) is a Swiss snowboarder, specializing in alpine snowboarding.

== Career ==
Zogg competed at the 2014 Winter Olympics for Switzerland. She was 3rd in the qualifying run of the parallel giant slalom, but lost in the 1/8 finals to Canada's Ariane Lavigne, finishing 9th. In the parallel slalom, she qualified 4th, then beat Japan's Tomoka Takeuchi, but was disqualified in the quarterfinals against the eventual champion, Austria's Julia Dujmovits, ending up 7th.

As of September 2014, her best showing at the World Championships is 14th, in the 2011 parallel slalom.

Zogg made her World Cup debut in December 2007. As of September 2014, she has four podium finishes, with her best being a silver medal in parallel slalom at Bad Gastein in 2011–12. Her best overall finish is 6th in 2011–12.

== World Cup podiums ==
Date	Location	Rank	Event
15 January 2012	Bad Gastein	2nd place, silver medalist(s)	Parallel slalom
22 February 2012	Stoneham	3rd place, bronze medalist(s)	Parallel giant slalom
3 March 2012	Moscow	3rd place, bronze medalist(s)	Parallel slalom
10 March 2012	La Molina	3rd place, bronze medalist(s)	Parallel giant slalom
