= Jeong Hae-rim =

South Korean snowboarder (born 1995)

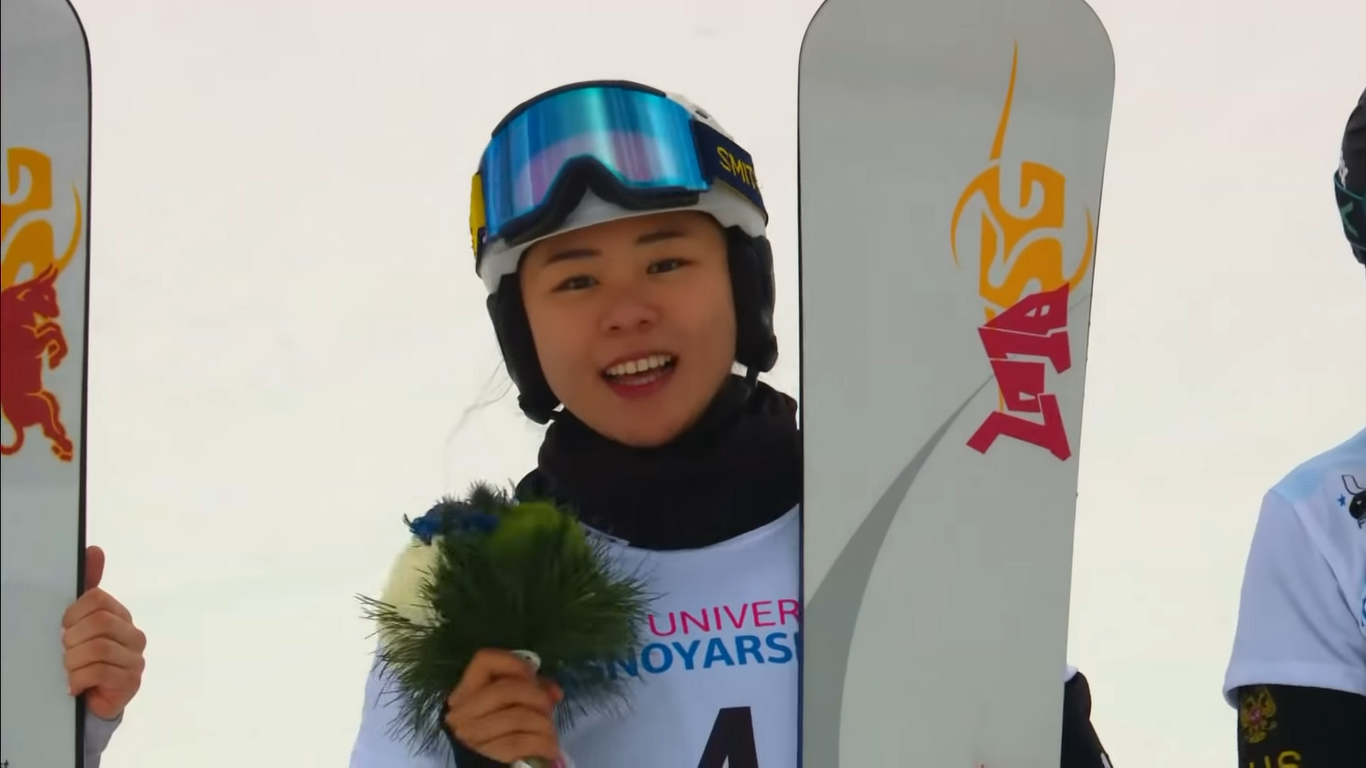
- Jeong at the 2019 Winter Universiade.

Personal information
- Born: 16 December 1995 (age 30) Suwon, South Korea

Sport
- Country: South Korea
- Sport: Snowboarding
Medal record
Representing South Korea
Winter Universiade
| Gold medal – first place | 2019 Krasnoyarsk | Parallel GS |
| Bronze medal – third place | 2019 Krasnoyarsk | Parallel slalom |

Jeong Hae-rim (born 16 December 1995) is a South Korean snowboarder.

She competed in the 2013, 2015 and 2017 FIS Snowboard World Championships, and in the 2018 Winter Olympics, in parallel giant slalom.
