= Daniela Ulbing =

Austrian snowboarder (born 1998)

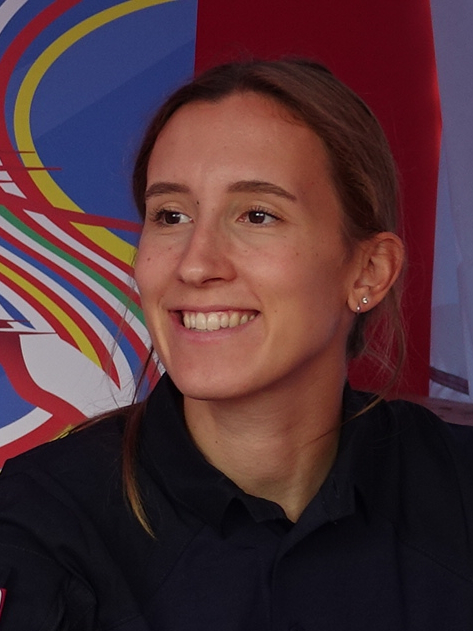
- Ulbing in 2023

Personal information
- Nationality: Austrian
- Born: 27 February 1998 (age 28) Villach, Austria
- Height: 1.67 m (5 ft 6 in)

Sport
- Sport: Skiing
Medal record
Women's snowboarding
Representing Austria
Olympic Games
Silver medal – second place	2022 Beijing	Parallel giant slalom
World Championships
Gold medal – first place	2017 Sierra Nevada	Parallel slalom
Silver medal – second place	2023 Bakuriani	Parallel giant slalom

Daniela Ulbing (born 27 February 1998) is an Austrian snowboarder who competes internationally.

She competed for Austria at the FIS Freestyle Ski and Snowboarding World Championships 2017 in Sierra Nevada, Spain, where she won a gold medal in Parallel slalom.
