= Nadya Ochner =

Italian snowboarder (born 1993)

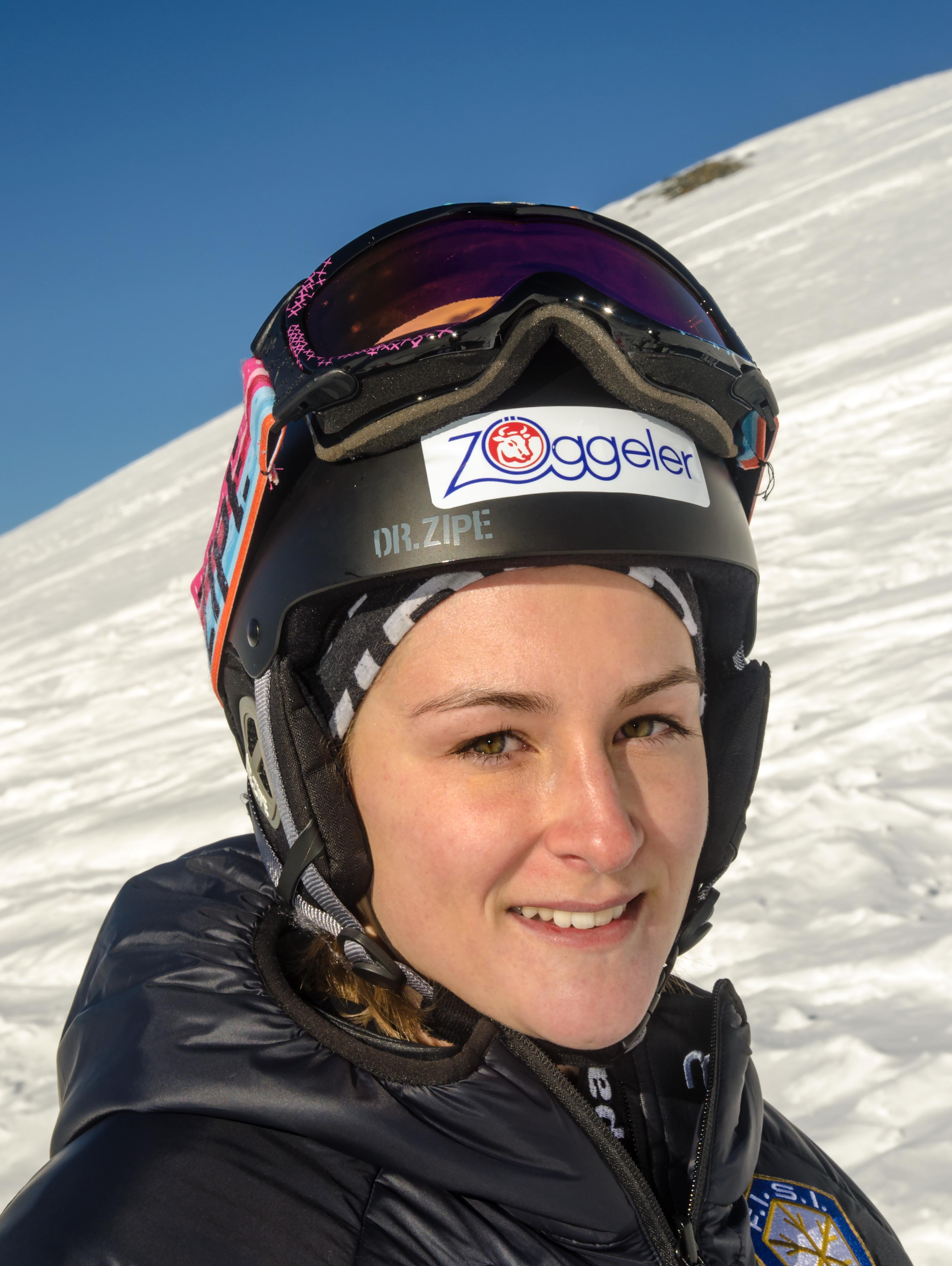

Personal information
- Born: 14 March 1993 (age 33) Merano, Italy

Sport
- Sport: Skiing
- Club: Fiamme Oro
Medal record
Women's snowboarding
Representing Italy
World Championships
Gold medal – first place	2023 Bakuriani	Mixed parallel slalom
Winter Universiade
Bronze medal – third place	2015 Granada	Parallel giant slalom

Nadya Ochner (born 14 March 1993) is an Italian snowboarder, specializing in Alpine snowboarding.

== Career ==
Ochner competed at the 2014 Winter Olympics for Italy. She was 26th in the qualifying run of the parallel giant slalom, and 22nd in the qualifying round of the parallel slalom, not advancing in either event.

As of September 2014, her best showing at the World Championships is 14th, in the 2013 parallel slalom.

Ochner made her World Cup debut in March 2010. As of September 2014, her best finish is 4th, in a pair of events. Her best overall finish is 18th, in 2011–12.
