= Carolin Langenhorst =

German snowboarder (born 1996)

Personal information
- Born: 3 February 1996 (age 30) Hamm, Germany

Sport
- Country: Germany
- Sport: Snowboarding

Carolin Langenhorst (born 3 February 1996) is a German snowboarder.

She competed in the 2017 FIS Snowboard World Championships, and in the 2018 Winter Olympics, in parallel giant slalom.
