= Ramona Theresia Hofmeister =

German snowboarder (born 1996)

Ramona Hofmeister
Personal information
- Full name: Ramona Theresia Hofmeister
- Nationality: German
- Born: 28 March 1996 (age 30) Bischofswiesen, Germany
- Height: 1.64 m (5 ft 5 in)
- Weight: 59 kg (130 lb)

Sport
- Country: Germany
- Sport: Snowboarding
- Event(s): Parallel giant slalom Parallel slalom
- Club: WSV Bischofswiesen
Medal record
Olympic Games
Bronze medal – third place	2018 Pyeongchang	Parallel GS
World Championships
Silver medal – second place	2021 Rogla	Parallel slalom
Bronze medal – third place	2019 Utah	Parallel slalom

Ramona Theresia Hofmeister (born 28 March 1996) is a German snowboarder who competes internationally.

She competed in the 2018 Winter Olympics, where she won a bronze medal in parallel giant slalom.
