= Claudia Riegler (snowboarder) =

Austrian snowboarder (born 1973)

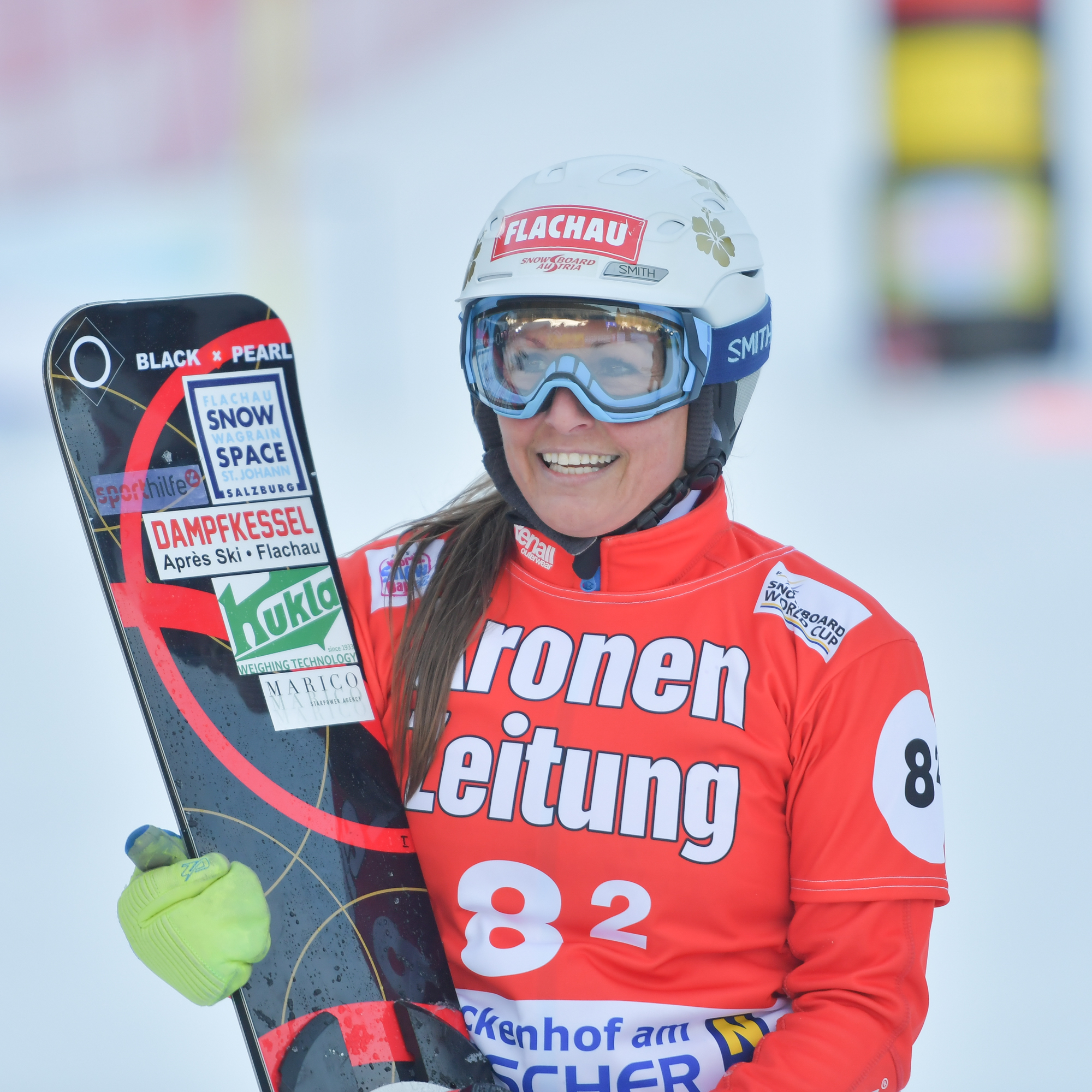
- Riegler at the World Cup in 2018

Personal information
- Born: 7 July 1973 (age 53) Vienna, Austria
- Height: 169 cm (5 ft 7 in)
- Weight: 62 kg (137 lb)
Medal record
Women's snowboarding
Representing Austria
World Championships
Gold medal – first place	2015 Kreischberg	Parallel GS
Silver medal – second place	2011 La Molina	Parallel GS
Bronze medal – third place	2011 La Molina	Parallel slalom

Claudia Riegler (born 7 July 1973 in Vienna) is a snowboarder from Austria. She has competed at five Winter Olympics, with her best result being a seventh for Austria at the 2010 Winter Olympics in parallel giant slalom. Riegler also captured silver and bronze medals at the 2011 FIS Snowboarding World Championships and gold at the 2015 FIS Snowboarding World Championships.

She is a sister of Manuela Riegler and Heinz Riegler.
