= 2022–23 FIS Snowboard World Cup =

Competitive snowboarding season

Discipline	Men	Women
Parallel Overall	(Austria) Fabian Obmann (1)	(Switzerland) Julie Zogg (2)
Parallel slalom	(Austria) Fabian Obmann (1)	(Switzerland) Julie Zogg (6)
Parallel giant slalom	(Italy) Roland Fischnaller (3)	(Germany) Ramona Theresia Hofmeister (4)
Snowboard cross	(Germany) Martin Nörl (2)	(United Kingdom) Charlotte Bankes (2)
Freestyle Overall	(Australia) Valentino Guseli (1)	(Japan) Mitsuki Ono (1)
Halfpipe	(Japan) Ruka Hirano (1)	(Japan) Mitsuki Ono (1)
Slopestyle	(United States) Dusty Henricksen (1)	(United States) Julia Marino (1)
Big Air	(Australia) Valentino Guseli (1)	(Japan) Reira Iwabuchi (3)
- Nations Cup: Austria (4)

Competition
Edition	29th	29th
Locations	29	29
Individual	42	42
Team	6	6
Cancelled	7	7

The 2022/23 FIS Snowboard Ski World Cup, organized by the International Ski Federation was the 29th World Cup in snowboarding for men and women. The season started on 22 October 2022 in Chur, Switzerland and concluded on 26 March 2023 in Silvaplana, Switzerland. This season included six disciplines: parallel slalom, parallel giant slalom, snowboard cross, halfpipe, slopestyle and big air.

== Map of world cup hosts ==
All 28 locations hosting world cup events in this season.

Alps 2022–23 FIS Snowboard World Cup (Alps) North America 2022–23 FIS Snowboard World Cup (North America)	Europe Asia 2022–23 FIS Snowboard World Cup (Asia) World Championships (not included in the World Cup)

== Men ==
=== Calendar ===
==== Snowboard Cross (SBX) ====
Season	Date	Place	Winner	Second	Third	Discipline leader	Ref.
1	4 December 2022	(France) Les Deux Alpes	(Germany) Martin Nörl	(Italy) Omar Visintin	(Canada) Éliot Grondin	(Germany) Martin Nörl	
2	16 December 2022	(Italy) Cervinia	(Austria) Alessandro Hämmerle	(Austria) Jakob Dusek	(Germany) Martin Nörl	(Germany) Martin Nörl	
3	17 December 2022	(Italy) Cervinia	(France) Loan Bozzolo	(Germany) Martin Nörl	(Switzerland) Kalle Koblet	(Germany) Martin Nörl	
	19 December 2022	(Austria) Montafon	cancelled				
	20 December 2022	(Austria) Montafon	cancelled				
4	4 February 2023	(Italy) Cortina d'Ampezzo	(France) Merlin Surget	(United States) Jake Vedder	(France) Léo Le Blé Jaques	(Germany) Martin Nörl	
FIS Freestyle Ski and Snowboarding World Championships 2023 (19 February – 4 March)
WC	1 March 2023	(Georgia (country)) Bakuriani	(Austria) Jakob Dusek	(Germany) Martin Nörl	(Italy) Omar Visintin	not included in the World Cup	
5	11 March 2023	(Spain) Sierra Nevada	(Spain) Lucas Eguibar	(Italy) Omar Visintin	(Italy) Lorenzo Sommariva	(Germany) Martin Nörl	
6	12 March 2023	(Spain) Sierra Nevada	(Switzerland) Kalle Koblet	(Spain) Lucas Eguibar	(France) Loan Bozzolo	(Spain) Lucas Eguibar	
7	16 March 2023	(Switzerland) Veysonnaz	(Germany) Martin Nörl	(Spain) Álvaro Romero	(Italy) Lorenzo Sommariva	(Germany) Martin Nörl	
8	25 March 2023	(Canada) Mont-Sainte-Anne	(Canada) Éliot Grondin	(Austria) Jakob Dusek	(Spain) Lucas Eguibar	(Germany) Martin Nörl	
9	26 March 2023	(Canada) Mont-Sainte-Anne	(Germany) Martin Nörl	(United States) Jake Vedder	(Canada) Éliot Grondin	(Germany) Martin Nörl	

==== Parallel (PGS/PSL) ====
Season	Date	Place	Event	Winner	Second	Third	Discipline leader	Ref.
1	11 December 2022	(Germany) Winterberg	PSL	(Austria) Alexander Payer	(Slovenia) Tim Mastnak	(Germany) Stefan Baumeister	(Austria) Alexander Payer	
2	15 December 2022	(Italy) Carezza	PGS	(Austria) Andreas Prommegger	(Switzerland) Dario Caviezel	(Italy) Roland Fischnaller	(Austria) Alexander Payer	
3	17 December 2022	(Italy) Cortina d'Ampezzo	PGS	(Italy) Roland Fischnaller	(Austria) Andreas Prommegger	(Italy) Aaron March	(Austria) Andreas Prommegger	
4	10 January 2023	(Austria) Bad Gastein	PSL	(Italy) Maurizio Bormolini	(Austria) Alexander Payer	(Germany) Stefan Baumeister	(Austria) Andreas Prommegger	
5	14 January 2023	(Switzerland) Scuol	PGS	(Poland) Oskar Kwiatkowski	(Italy) Mirko Felicetti	(Austria) Andreas Prommegger	(Austria) Andreas Prommegger	
6	21 January 2023	(Bulgaria) Bansko	PSL	(Switzerland) Dario Caviezel	(Austria) Fabian Obmann	(Italy) Edwin Coratti	(Austria) Andreas Prommegger	
7	22 January 2023	(Bulgaria) Bansko	PSL	(Italy) Maurizio Bormolini	(Austria) Arvid Auner	(Germany) Stefan Baumeister	(Italy) Maurizio Bormolini	
8	26 January 2023	(Canada) Blue Mountain	PGS	(Austria) Benjamin Karl	(South Korea) Lee Sang-ho	(Poland) Oskar Kwiatkowski	(Italy) Maurizio Bormolini	
9	27 January 2023	(Canada) Blue Mountain	PGS	(Poland) Oskar Kwiatkowski	(Austria) Alexander Payer	(Italy) Roland Fischnaller	(Austria) Alexander Payer	
FIS Freestyle Ski and Snowboarding World Championships 2023 (19 February – 4 March)
WC	19 February 2023	(Georgia (country)) Bakuriani	PGS	(Poland) Oskar Kwiatkowski	(Switzerland) Dario Caviezel	(Austria) Alexander Payer	not included in the World Cup	
WC	21 February 2023	(Georgia (country)) Bakuriani	PSL	(Austria) Andreas Prommegger	(Austria) Arvid Auner	(Canada) Arnaud Gaudet	not included in the World Cup	
	11 March 2023	(Italy) Livigno	PGS	cancelled				
	12 March 2023	(Italy) Livigno	PSL	cancelled				
	11 March 2023	(Italy) Piancavallo	PSL	cancelled				
10	15 March 2023	(Slovenia) Rogla	PGL	(Italy) Roland Fischnaller	(Italy) Mirko Felicetti	(Italy) Edwin Coratti	(Italy) Maurizio Bormolini	
11	18 March 2023	(Germany) Berchtesgaden	PSL	(Austria) Fabian Obmann	(Austria) Arvid Auner	(Slovenia) Rok Marguč	(Austria) Fabian Obmann	

==== Halfpipe (HP) ====
Season	Date	Place	Winner	Second	Third	Discipline leader	Ref.
1	16 December 2022	(United States) Copper Mountain	(Australia) Scotty James	(Switzerland) Jan Scherrer	(Japan) Kaishu Hirano	(Australia) Scotty James	
2	21 January 2023	(Switzerland) Laax	(Japan) Ruka Hirano	(Australia) Scotty James	(Japan) Yuto Totsuka	(Australia) Scotty James	
3	4 February 2023	(United States) Mammoth Mountain	(Japan) Ruka Hirano	(Australia) Valentino Guseli	(United States) Chase Blackwell	(Japan) Ruka Hirano	
4	11 February 2023	(Canada) Calgary	(Japan) Ruka Hirano	(Australia) Valentino Guseli	(Japan) Shuichiro Shigeno	(Japan) Ruka Hirano	
FIS Freestyle Ski and Snowboarding World Championships 2023 (19 February – 4 March)
WC	3 March 2023	(Georgia (country)) Bakuriani	(South Korea) Lee Chae-un	(Australia) Valentino Guseli	(Switzerland) Jan Scherrer	not included in the World Cup	
	12 March 2023	(China) Secret Garden	cancelled				

==== Slopestyle (SS) ====
Season	Date	Place	Winner	Second	Third	Discipline leader	Ref.
1	22 January 2023	(Switzerland) Laax	(Norway) Marcus Kleveland	(United States) Dusty Henricksen	(Sweden) Sven Thorgren	(Norway) Marcus Kleveland	
2	3 February 2023	(United States) Mammoth Mountain	(United States) Dusty Henricksen	(Australia) Valentino Guseli	(United States) Chris Corning	(United States) Dusty Henricksen	
3	12 February 2023	(Canada) Calgary	(Canada) Darcy Sharpe	(United States) Dusty Henricksen	(Canada) Cameron Spalding	(United States) Dusty Henricksen	
FIS Freestyle Ski and Snowboarding World Championships 2023 (19 February – 4 March)
WC	27 February 2023	(Georgia (country)) Bakuriani	(Norway) Marcus Kleveland	(Japan) Ryoma Kimata	(United States) Chris Corning	not included in the World Cup	
4	26 March 2023	(Switzerland) Silvaplana	(Japan) Taiga Hasegawa	(Canada) Liam Brearley	(Sweden) Sven Thorgren	(United States) Dusty Henricksen	

==== Big Air (BA) ====
Season	Date	Place	Winner	Second	Third	Discipline leader	Ref.
1	22 October 2022	(Switzerland) Chur	(Japan) Takeru Otsuka	(Japan) Ruki Tobita	(Switzerland) Nick Puenter	(Japan) Takeru Otsuka	
	25 November 2022	(Sweden) Falun	cancelled				
2	10 December 2022	(Canada) Edmonton	(Australia) Valentino Guseli	(United States) Chris Corning	(Canada) Nicolas Laframboise	(Australia) Valentino Guseli	
3	17 December 2022	(United States) Copper Mountain	(Norway) Marcus Kleveland	(United States) Chris Corning	(Italy) Ian Matteoli	(Australia) Valentino Guseli	
4	14 January 2023	(Austria) Kreischberg	(Japan) Taiga Hasegawa	(Japan) Ryoma Kimata	(Japan) Kira Kimura	(Australia) Valentino Guseli	
FIS Freestyle Ski and Snowboarding World Championships 2023 (19 February – 4 March)
WC	4 March 2023	(Georgia (country)) Bakuriani	(Japan) Taiga Hasegawa	(Norway) Mons Røisland	(Switzerland) Nicolas Huber	not included in the World Cup	

=== Standings ===
==== Parallel overall (PSL/PGS) ====
Rank	after all 11 events	Points
	(Austria) Fabian Obmann	485
2	(Italy) Maurizio Bormolini	481
3	(Austria) Andreas Prommegger	465
4	(Austria) Alexander Payer	433
5	(Poland) Oskar Kwiatkowski	418

==== Parallel slalom ====
Rank	after all 5 events	Points
	(Austria) Fabian Obmann	297
2	(Italy) Maurizio Bormolini	295
3	(Austria) Arvid Auner	251
4	(Austria) Alexander Payer	225
5	(Italy) Edwin Coratti	217

==== Parallel giant slalom ====
Rank	after all 6 events	Points
	(Italy) Roland Fischnaller	344
2	(Austria) Andreas Prommegger	336
3	(Poland) Oskar Kwiatkowski	334
4	(Italy) Mirko Felicetti	253
5	(Austria) Benjamin Karl	235

==== Snowboard Cross ====
Rank	after all 9 events	Points
	(Germany) Martin Nörl	510
2	(Spain) Lucas Eguibar	436
3	(Canada) Éliot Grondin	399
4	(Italy) Omar Visintin	389
5	(France) Merlin Surget	341

==== Freestyle overall (BA/SS/HP) ====
Rank	after all 12 events	Points
	(Australia) Valentino Guseli	440
2	(United States) Dusty Henricksen	332
3	(Japan) Taiga Hasegawa	323
4	(Japan) Ruka Hirano	314
5	(United States) Chris Corning	285

==== Halfpipe ====
Rank	after all 4 events	Points
	(Japan) Ruka Hirano	314
2	(Australia) Valentino Guseli	246
3	(Australia) Scotty James	180
4	(South Korea) Chaeun Lee	177
5	(Japan) Yuto Totsuka	159

==== Slopestyle ====
Rank	after all 4 events	Points
	(United States) Dusty Henricksen	296
2	(Japan) Taiga Hasegawa	186
3	(Australia) Valentino Guseli	165
4	(Canada) Liam Brearley	144
5	(Canada) Cameron Spalding	125

==== Big Air ====
Rank	after all 4 events	Points
	(Australia) Valentino Guseli	214
2	(United States) Chris Corning	196
3	(Norway) Marcus Kleveland	140
4	(Japan) Ryoma Kimata	138
5	(Japan) Taiga Hasegawa	137

== Women ==
=== Calendar ===
==== Snowboard Cross (SBX) ====
Season	Date	Place	Winner	Second	Third	Discipline leader	Ref.
1	4 December 2022	(France) Les Deux Alpes	(Australia) Josie Baff	(France) Chloé Trespeuch	(France) Léa Casta	(Australia) Josie Baff	
2	16 December 2022	(Italy) Cervinia	(France) Chloé Trespeuch	(France) Manon Petit-Lenoir	(United Kingdom) Charlotte Bankes	(France) Chloé Trespeuch	
3	17 December 2022	(Italy) Cervinia	(United Kingdom) Charlotte Bankes	(Australia) Josie Baff	(France) Chloé Trespeuch	(France) Chloé Trespeuch	
	19 December 2022	(Austria) Montafon	cancelled				
	20 December 2022	(Austria) Montafon	cancelled				
4	4 February 2023	(Italy) Cortina d'Ampezzo	(United Kingdom) Charlotte Bankes	(United States) Faye Gulini	(France) Chloé Trespeuch	(France) Chloé Trespeuch	
FIS Freestyle Ski and Snowboarding World Championships 2023 (19 February – 4 March)
WC	1 March 2023	(Georgia (country)) Bakuriani	(Czech Republic) Eva Adamczyková	(Australia) Josie Baff	(United States) Lindsey Jacobellis	not included in the World Cup	
5	11 March 2023	(Spain) Sierra Nevada	(United Kingdom) Charlotte Bankes	(France) Chloé Trespeuch	(United States) Lindsey Jacobellis	(France) Chloé Trespeuch	
6	12 March 2023	(Spain) Sierra Nevada	(United Kingdom) Charlotte Bankes	(France) Chloé Trespeuch	(France) Manon Petit-Lenoir	(United Kingdom) Charlotte Bankes	
7	16 March 2023	(Switzerland) Veysonnaz	(United Kingdom) Charlotte Bankes	(Czech Republic) Eva Adamczyková	(Australia) Josie Baff	(United Kingdom) Charlotte Bankes	
8	25 March 2023	(Canada) Mont-Sainte-Anne	(United Kingdom) Charlotte Bankes	(France) Chloé Trespeuch	(United States) Lindsey Jacobellis	(United Kingdom) Charlotte Bankes	
9	26 March 2023	(Canada) Mont-Sainte-Anne	(Australia) Josie Baff	(Austria) Pia Zerkhold	(France) Chloé Trespeuch	(United Kingdom) Charlotte Bankes	

==== Parallel (PGS/PSL) ====
Season	Date	Place	Event	Winner	Second	Third	Discipline leader	Ref.
1	10 December 2022	(Germany) Winterberg	PSL	(Austria) Sabine Schöffmann	(Switzerland) Julie Zogg	(Austria) Daniela Ulbing	(Austria) Sabine Schöffmann	
2	15 December 2022	(Italy) Carezza	PGS	(Netherlands) Michelle Dekker	(Poland) Aleksandra Król	(Switzerland) Ladina Jenny	(Switzerland) Julie Zogg	
3	17 December 2022	(Italy) Cortina d'Ampezzo	PGS	(Slovenia) Gloria Kotnik	(Germany) Ramona Theresia Hofmeister	(Canada) Megan Farrell	(Slovenia) Gloria Kotnik	
4	10 January 2023	(Austria) Bad Gastein	PSL	(Austria) Daniela Ulbing	(Austria) Claudia Riegler	(Switzerland) Ladina Jenny	(Austria) Daniela Ulbing	
5	14 January 2023	(Switzerland) Scuol	PGS	(Germany) Carolin Langenhorst	(Germany) Ramona Theresia Hofmeister	(Switzerland) Julie Zogg	(Austria) Daniela Ulbing	
6	21 January 2023	(Bulgaria) Bansko	PSL	(Switzerland) Julie Zogg	(Austria) Sabine Schöffmann	(Switzerland) Jessica Keiser	(Switzerland) Julie Zogg	
7	22 January 2023	(Bulgaria) Bansko	PSL	(Switzerland) Julie Zogg	(Austria) Daniela Ulbing	(Switzerland) Patrizia Kummer	(Switzerland) Julie Zogg	
8	26 January 2023	(Canada) Blue Mountain	PGS	(Switzerland) Ladina Jenny	(Italy) Lucia Dalmasso	(Austria) Sabine Schöffmann	(Switzerland) Julie Zogg	
9	27 January 2023	(Canada) Blue Mountain	PGS	(Germany) Ramona Theresia Hofmeister	(Switzerland) Julie Zogg	(Austria) Daniela Ulbing	(Switzerland) Julie Zogg	
FIS Freestyle Ski and Snowboarding World Championships 2023 (19 February – 4 March)
WC	19 February 2023	(Georgia (country)) Bakuriani	PGS	(Japan) Tsubaki Miki	(Austria) Daniela Ulbing	(Poland) Aleksandra Król	not included in the World Cup	
WC	21 February 2023	(Georgia (country)) Bakuriani	PSL	(Switzerland) Julie Zogg	(Switzerland) Ladina Jenny	(Austria) Sabine Schöffmann	not included in the World Cup	
	11 March 2023	(Italy) Livigno	PGS	cancelled				
	12 March 2023	(Italy) Livigno	PSL	cancelled				
	11 March 2023	(Italy) Piancavallo	PSL	cancelled				
10	15 March 2023	(Slovenia) Rogla	PGS	(Austria) Sabine Schöffmann	(Czech Republic) Ester Ledecká	(Japan) Tsubaki Miki	(Switzerland) Julie Zogg	
11	18 March 2023	(Germany) Berchtesgaden	PSL	(Czech Republic) Ester Ledecká	(Germany) Ramona Theresia Hofmeister	(Germany) Cheyenne Loch	(Switzerland) Julie Zogg	

==== Halfpipe (HP) ====
Season	Date	Place	Winner	Second	Third	Discipline leader	Ref.
1	16 December 2022	(United States) Copper Mountain	(Spain) Queralt Castellet	(Canada) Elizabeth Hosking	(Japan) Mitsuki Ono	(Spain) Queralt Castellet	
2	21 January 2023	(Switzerland) Laax	(Japan) Mitsuki Ono	(China) Wu Shaotong	(United States) Maddie Mastro	(Japan) Mitsuki Ono	
3	4 February 2023	(United States) Mammoth Mountain	(Japan) Mitsuki Ono	(China) Cai Xuetong	(United States) Maddie Mastro	(Japan) Mitsuki Ono	
4	11 February 2023	(Canada) Calgary	(Japan) Mitsuki Ono	(Canada) Elizabeth Hosking	(Switzerland) Berenice Wicki	(Japan) Mitsuki Ono	
FIS Freestyle Ski and Snowboarding World Championships 2023 (19 February – 4 March)
WC	3 March 2023	(Georgia (country)) Bakuriani	(China) Cai Xuetong	(Canada) Elizabeth Hosking	(Japan) Mitsuki Ono	not included in the World Cup	
	12 March 2023	(China) Secret Garden	cancelled				

==== Slopestyle (SS) ====
Season	Date	Place	Winner	Second	Third	Discipline leader	Ref.
1	22 January 2023	(Switzerland) Laax	(New Zealand) Zoi Sadowski-Synnott	(United Kingdom) Mia Brookes	(Austria) Anna Gasser	(New Zealand) Zoi Sadowski-Synnott	
2	3 February 2023	(United States) Mammoth Mountain	(United States) Julia Marino	(Japan) Reira Iwabuchi	(Germany) Annika Morgan	(Japan) Reira Iwabuchi	
3	12 February 2023	(Canada) Calgary	(United States) Julia Marino	(Canada) Laurie Blouin	(Canada) Jasmine Baird	(United States) Julia Marino	
FIS Freestyle Ski and Snowboarding World Championships 2023 (19 February – 4 March)
WC	27 February 2023	(Georgia (country)) Bakuriani	(United Kingdom) Mia Brookes	(New Zealand) Zoi Sadowski-Synnott	(Japan) Miyabi Onitsuka	not included in the World Cup	
4	25 March 2023	(Switzerland) Silvaplana	(United States) Julia Marino	(Australia) Tess Coady	(Austria) Anna Gasser	(United States) Julia Marino	

==== Big Air (BA) ====
Season	Date	Place	Winner	Second	Third	Discipline leader	Ref.
1	22 October 2022	(Switzerland) Chur	(Japan) Reira Iwabuchi	(Austria) Anna Gasser	(Canada) Jasmine Baird	(Japan) Reira Iwabuchi	
	25 November 2022	(Sweden) Falun	cancelled				
3	10 December 2022	(Canada) Edmonton	(Canada) Jasmine Baird	(Belgium) Evy Poppe	(Japan) Reira Iwabuchi	(Canada) Jasmine Baird (Japan) Reira Iwabuchi	
4	17 December 2022	(United States) Copper Mountain	(Japan) Mari Fukada	(United States) Hailey Langland	(Japan) Miyabi Onitsuka	(Canada) Jasmine Baird (Japan) Reira Iwabuchi	
5	14 January 2023	(Austria) Kreischberg	(Austria) Anna Gasser	(New Zealand) Zoi Sadowski-Synnott	(Japan) Kokome Murase	(Japan) Reira Iwabuchi	
FIS Freestyle Ski and Snowboarding World Championships 2023 (19 February – 4 March)
WC	4 March 2023	(Georgia (country)) Bakuriani	(Austria) Anna Gasser	(Japan) Miyabi Onitsuka	(Australia) Tess Coady	not included in the World Cup	

=== Standings ===
==== Parallel overall (PSL/PGS) ====
Rank	after all 11 events	Points
	(Switzerland) Julie Zogg	595
2	(Germany) Ramona Theresia Hofmeister	584
3	(Austria) Sabine Schöffmann	549
4	(Austria) Daniela Ulbing	491
5	(Japan) Tsubaki Miki	441

==== Parallel slalom ====
Rank	after all 5 events	Points
	(Switzerland) Julie Zogg	345
2	(Austria) Daniela Ulbing	290
3	(Austria) Sabine Schöffmann	288
4	(Germany) Ramona Theresia Hofmeister	225
5	(Austria) Claudia Riegler	196

==== Parallel giant slalom ====
Rank	after all 6 events	Points
	(Germany) Ramona Theresia Hofmeister	359
2	(Austria) Sabine Schöffmann	261
3	(Switzerland) Ladina Jenny	261
4	(Poland) Aleksandra Król	257
5	(Switzerland) Julie Zogg	250

==== Snowboard Cross ====
Rank	after all 9 events	Points
	(United Kingdom) Charlotte Bankes	723
2	(France) Chloé Trespeuch	650
3	(Australia) Josie Baff	493
4	(Czech Republic) Eva Adamczyková	407
5	(France) Manon Petit-Lenoir	356

==== Freestyle overall (BA/SS/HP) ====
Rank	after all 12 events	Points
	(Japan) Mitsuki Ono	360
2	(United States) Julia Marino	353
3	(Japan) Reira Iwabuchi	322
4	(Austria) Anna Gasser	300
5	(Japan) Miyabi Onitsuka	263

==== Halfpipe ====
Rank	after all 4 events	Points
	(Japan) Mitsuki Ono	360
2	(Canada) Elizabeth Hosking	237
3	(United States) Maddie Mastro	191
4	(Spain) Queralt Castellet	179
5	(Japan) Ruki Tomita	136

==== Slopestyle ====
Rank	after all 4 events	Points
	(United States) Julia Marino	313
2	(Japan) Miyabi Onitsuka	153
3	(United Kingdom) Mia Brookes	130
3	(Japan) Reira Iwabuchi	130
5	(Canada) Laurie Blouin	129

==== Big Air ====
Rank	after all 4 events	Points
	(Japan) Reira Iwabuchi	192
2	(Japan) Kokomo Murase	182
3	(Austria) Anna Gasser	180
4	(Canada) Jasmine Baird	160
5	(Belgium) Evy Poppe	138

== Team ==
=== Parallel mixed (SXT) ===
Season	Date	Place	Event	Winner	Second	Third	Discipline leader	Ref.
1	10 December 2022	(Germany) Winterberg	PSL_{M}	Switzerland II Gian Casanova; Ladina Jenny	Austria I Andreas Prommegger; Daniela Ulbing	Poland I Oskar Kwiatkowski; Aleksandra Król	Switzerland II	
2	11 January 2023	(Austria) Bad Gastein	PSL_{M}	Austria I Andreas Prommegger; Daniela Ulbing	Germany I Stefan Baumeister; Ramona Theresia Hofmeister	Switzerland II Dario Caviezel; Julie Zogg	Austria I	
FIS Freestyle Ski and Snowboarding World Championships 2023 (19 February – 4 March)
WC	22 February 2023	(Georgia (country)) Bakuriani	PSL_{M}	Italy II Aaron March; Nadya Ochner	Austria I Andreas Prommegger; Sabine Schöffmann	Switzerland I Dario Caviezel; Julie Zogg	not included in the World Cup	
	12 March 2023	(Italy) Piancavallo	PSL_{M}	cancelled				
3	19 March 2023	(Germany) Berchtesgaden	PSL_{M}	Austria II Fabian Obmann; Sabine Schöffmann	Italy II Maurizio Bormolini; Elisa Caffont	Italy I Edwin Coratti; Lucia Dalmasso	Austria I	

==== Standings ====
Rank	after all 3 events	Points
	(Austria) Andreas Prommegger / Daniela Ulbing	209
2	(Switzerland) Gian Casanova / Ladina Jenny	154
3	(Italy) Maurizio Bormolini / Elisa Caffont	136
4	(Germany) Stefan Baumeister / Ramona Theresia Hofmeister	133
5	(Switzerland) Dario Caviezel / Julie Zogg	125

=== Snowboard cross mixed team (SBX) ===
Season	Date	Place	Winner	Second	Third	Discipline leader	Ref.
FIS Freestyle Ski and Snowboarding World Championships 2023 (19 February – 4 March)
WC	2 March 2023	(Georgia (country)) Bakuriani	Great Britain I Huw Nightingale; Charlotte Bankes	Austria I Jakob Dusek; Pia Zerkhold	France I Merlin Surget; Chloé Trespeuch	not included in the World Cup	

== Nations Cup ==
=== Overall ===
Rank	after all 67 events	Points
	Austria	4011
2	Japan	3681
3	United States	3569
4	Switzerland	3478
5	Italy	3456

== Podium table by nation ==
Table showing the World Cup podium places (gold–1st place, silver–2nd place, bronze–3rd place) by the countries represented by the athletes.

Rank	Nation	Gold	Silver	Bronze	Total
1	Austria	11	14	6	31
2	Japan	11	3	9	23
3	Switzerland	6	4	9	19
4	Great Britain	6	1	1	8
5	Germany	5	5	6	16
6	United States	4	8	6	18
7	Italy	4	6	9	19
8	Australia	4	6	1	11
9	France	3	5	7	15
10	Canada	3	4	7	14
11	Spain	2	2	1	5
12	Poland	2	1	2	5
13	Norway	2	0	0	2
14	Czech Republic	1	2	0	3
15	Slovenia	1	1	1	3
16	New Zealand	1	1	0	2
17	Netherlands	1	0	0	1
18	China	0	2	0	2
19	Belgium	0	1	0	1
19	South Korea	0	1	0	1
21	Sweden	0	0	2	2
Totals (21 entries)		67	67	67	201
