= FIS Freestyle Ski and Snowboarding World Championships 2021 – Men's parallel giant slalom =

Men's parallel giant slalom at the FIS Freestyle Ski and Snowboarding World Championships 2021
- Location: Rogla, Slovenia
- Date: 1 March
- Competitors: 58 from 23 nations

Medalists
gold medal	Dmitry Loginov
silver medal	Roland Fischnaller	Italy
bronze medal	Andrey Sobolev

The Men's parallel giant slalom competition at the FIS Freestyle Ski and Snowboarding World Championships 2021 was held on 1 March 2021.

== Qualification ==
The qualification was started at 09:35. After the first run, the top 16 snowboarders on each course were allowed a second run on the opposite course.

Rank	Bib	Name	Country	Blue course	Red course	Total	Notes
1	25	Igor Sluev	Russian Ski Federation	31.43	30.68	1:02.11	Q
2	27	Dmitry Loginov	Russian Ski Federation	31.31	31.18	1:02.49	Q
3	32	Andrey Sobolev	Russian Ski Federation	30.82	31.68	1:02.50	Q
4	26	Roland Fischnaller	Italy	30.88	31.64	1:02.52	Q
5	31	Nevin Galmarini	Switzerland	31.70	31.01	1:02.71	Q
6	36	Lukas Mathies	Austria	31.05	31.78	1:02.83	Q
7	17	Aaron March	Italy	32.07	30.84	1:02.91	Q
8	21	Mirko Felicetti	Italy	31.26	31.66	1:02.92	Q
9	39	Kim Sang-kyum	South Korea	31.58	31.35	1:02.93	Q
10	24	Oskar Kwiatkowski	Poland	31.05	31.91	1:02.96	Q
11	23	Edwin Coratti	Italy	31.76	31.27	1:03.03	Q
12	20	Tim Mastnak	Slovenia	30.98	32.08	1:03.06	Q
13	29	Alexander Payer	Austria	31.87	31.21	1:03.08	Q
14	34	Lee Sang-ho	South Korea	31.24	31.84	1:03.08	Q
15	22	Andreas Prommegger	Austria	31.19	31.90	1:03.09	Q
16	35	Michał Nowaczyk	Poland	31.96	31.20	1:03.16	Q
17	49	Aaron Muss	United States	32.32	30.90	1:03.22	
18	33	Dario Caviezel	Switzerland	31.83	31.40	1:03.23	
19	37	Radoslav Yankov	Bulgaria	31.27	32.01	1:03.28	
20	19	Stefan Baumeister	Germany	31.88	31.49	1:03.37	
21	28	Žan Košir	Slovenia	31.33	32.06	1:03.39	
22	18	Vic Wild	Russian Ski Federation	31.00	32.43	1:03.43	
23	52	Elias Huber	Germany	31.97	31.62	1:03.59	
24	45	Shinnosuke Kamino	Japan	31.69	31.97	1:03.66	
25	50	Arnaud Gaudet	Canada	31.40	32.41	1:03.81	
26	30	Benjamin Karl	Austria	31.80	32.03	1:03.83	
27	43	Sébastien Beaulieu	Canada	32.19	31.75	1:03.94	
28	62	Cho Wan-hee	South Korea	32.15	31.96	1:04.11	
29	54	Gian Casanova	Switzerland	31.94	32.56	1:04.50	
30	48	Cody Winters	United States	31.98	32.59	1:04.57	
31	63	Jernej Glavan	Slovenia	36.01	31.91	1:07.92	
32	56	Jules Lefebvre	Canada	32.12	DSQ		
33	41	Sylvain Dufour	France		32.18		
34	44	Masaki Shiba	Japan	32.21			
35	57	Choi Bo-gun	South Korea		32.22		
36	68	Christian de Oliveira	Portugal	32.27			
37	47	Darren Gardner	Canada		32.42		
38	53	Ole Mikkel Prantl	Germany		32.45		
39	61	Matej Bačo	Slovakia		32.63		
40	42	Rok Marguč	Slovenia	33.38			
41	66	Andrii Kabaliuk	Ukraine	33.60			
42	64	Stanislav Hachak	Ukraine	33.64			
43	69	Adam Počinek	Czech Republic		34.25		
44	59	Vasyl Kasheliuk	Ukraine		34.33		
45	67	Vladislav Zuyev	Kazakhstan		34.58		
46	65	Viktor Brůžek	Czech Republic		34.64		
47	58	Rollan Sadykov	Kazakhstan	34.97			
48	72	Uğur Koçak	Turkey	35.89			
49	74	Emre Boydak	Turkey	35.93			
50	51	Mykhailo Kharuk	Ukraine		37.38		
51	70	Aleksandar Kacarski	North Macedonia	37.80			
52	73	Ioannis Doumos	Greece		38.77		
	71	Endre Papp	Hungary		DSQ		
	60	Revaz Nazgaidze	Georgia	DSQ			
	55	Ryan Rosencranz	United States		DSQ		
	46	Yannik Angenend	Germany	DSQ			
	40	Robert Burns	United States	DSQ			
	38	Dmitriy Karlagachev	Russian Ski Federation	DSQ			

== Elimination round ==
The 16 best racers advanced to the elimination round.

1/8 finals
4	(Italy) Roland Fischnaller
13	(Austria) Alexander Payer	+0.37
5	(Switzerland) Nevin Galmarini
12	(Slovenia) Tim Mastnak	+0.17
8	(Italy) Mirko Felicetti	+0.61
9	(South Korea) Kim Sang-kyum
1	(Russia) Igor Sluev	+0.42
16	(Poland) Michał Nowaczyk
2	(Russia) Dmitry Loginov
15	(Austria) Andreas Prommegger	+0.17
7	(Italy) Aaron March
10	(Poland) Oskar Kwiatkowski	+0.30
6	(Austria) Lukas Mathies
11	(Italy) Edwin Coratti	DNF
3	(Russia) Andrey Sobolev
14	(South Korea) Lee Sang-ho	+0.15

Quarterfinals
4	(Italy) Roland Fischnaller
5	(Switzerland) Nevin Galmarini	+0.02
9	(South Korea) Kim Sang-kyum
16	(Poland) Michał Nowaczyk	+0.02
2	(Russia) Dmitry Loginov
7	(Italy) Aaron March	+0.18
6	(Austria) Lukas Mathies	+0.17
3	(Russia) Andrey Sobolev

Semifinals
4	(Italy) Roland Fischnaller
9	(South Korea) Kim Sang-kyum	+0.78
2	(Russia) Dmitry Loginov
3	(Russia) Andrey Sobolev	+0.07

Final
4	(Italy) Roland Fischnaller	+0.01
2	(Russia) Dmitry Loginov
Third place
9	(South Korea) Kim Sang-kyum	+0.26
3	(Russia) Andrey Sobolev
