= FIS Freestyle Ski and Snowboarding World Championships 2023 – Men's parallel slalom =

Men's parallel slalom at the FIS Freestyle Ski and Snowboarding World Championships 2023
- Location: Bakuriani, Georgia
- Dates: 21 February
- Competitors: 48 from 18 nations

Medalists
gold medal	Andreas Prommegger	Austria
silver medal	Arvid Auner	Austria
bronze medal	Arnaud Gaudet	Canada

The Men's parallel slalom competition at the FIS Freestyle Ski and Snowboarding World Championships 2023 was held on 21 February 2023.

== Qualification ==
The qualification was started at 09:51. After the first run, the top 16 snowboarders on each course were allowed a second run on the opposite course.

Rank	Bib	Name	Country	Blue course	Red course	Total	Notes
1	25	Andreas Prommegger	Austria	36.62	36.33	1:12.95	Q
2	17	Fabian Obmann	Austria	36.62	36.45	1:13.07	Q
3	26	Lee Sang-ho	South Korea	36.17	37.12	1:13.29	Q
4	29	Dario Caviezel	Switzerland	36.74	36.61	1:13.35	Q
5	27	Arnaud Gaudet	Canada	36.80	36.56	1:13.36	Q
6	32	Arvid Auner	Austria	36.81	36.62	1:13.43	Q
7	24	Radoslav Yankov	Bulgaria	36.43	37.12	1:13.55	Q
8	18	Aaron March	Italy	36.69	37.08	1:13.77	Q
9	38	Kim Sang-kyum	South Korea	36.68	37.73	1:14.41	Q
10	33	Žan Košir	Slovenia	37.60	36.86	1:14.46	Q
11	22	March Hofer	Italy	37.10	37.41	1:14.51	Q
12	43	Darren Gardner	Canada	37.33	37.35	1:14.68	Q
13	37	Rok Marguč	Slovenia	37.60	37.21	1:14.81	Q
14	40	Gian Casanova	Switzerland	37.47	37.34	1:14.81	Q
15	34	Oskar Kwiatkowski	Poland	37.60	37.36	1:14.96	Q
16	31	Edwin Coratti	Italy	36.76	38.21	1:14.97	Q
17	41	Michał Nowaczyk	Poland	38.11	37.59	1:15.70	
18	35	Elias Huber	Germany	37.59	38.42	1:16.01	
19	42	Ole Mikkel Prantl	Germany	37.69	38.47	1:16.16	
20	36	Ben Heldman	Canada	37.67	38.89	1:16.56	
21	19	Cody Winters	United States	40.76	36.69	1:17.45	
22	61	Qin Zihan	China	38.56	38.94	1:17.50	
23	28	Tim Mastnak	Slovenia	36.90	40.88	1:17.78	
24	47	Mykhailo Kharuk	Ukraine	40.27	38.58	1:18.85	
25	54	Vasyl Kasheliuk	Ukraine	39.79	39.76	1:19.55	
26	39	Yannik Angenend	Germany	43.10	38.12	1:21.22	
27	55	Ryusuke Shinohara	Japan	42.64	39.45	1:22.09	
28	46	Cho Wan-hee	South Korea	40.99	41.90	1:22.89	
29	52	Ryan Rosencranz	United States	40.50	46.39	1:26.89	
30	21	Maurizio Bormolini	Italy	DNF	35.90	—	
31	30	Stefan Baumeister	Germany	38.36	DNF	—	
32	20	Benjamin Karl	Austria	36.74	DSQ	—	
33	53	Oleksandr Belinskyi	Ukraine		39.69	—	
34	49	Dylan Udolf	United States		39.72	—	
35	45	Jamie Behan	Canada		40.40	—	
36	57	Mikolaj Rutkowski	Poland		40.45	—	
37	51	Daichi Shimizu	Japan		40.98	—	
38	50	Matej Bačo	Slovakia	41.31		—	
39	48	Hong Seung-yeong	South Korea	41.45		—	
40	54	Stanislav Hachak	Ukraine	42.92		—	
41	55	Vladislav Zuyev	Kazakhstan		45.62	—	
42	53	Ioannis Doumos	Greece		47.78	—	
43	52	Kryštof Minárik	Czech Republic	49.66		—	
	23	Alexander Payer	Austria		DNF	—	
	44	Masaki Shiba	Japan	DSQ		—	
	58	Steven MacCutcheon	United States	DSQ		—	
	59	Adam Počinek	Czech Republic		DSQ	—	
	60	Revaz Nazgaidze	Georgia	DSQ		—	
	56	Shogo Suminaga	Japan	DNS		—	

== Elimination round ==
The 16 best racers advanced to the elimination round.

Round of 16
4 (Switzerland) Caviezel
13 (Slovenia) Marguč	+0.04
5 (Canada) Gaudet
12 (Canada) Gardner	+1.54
8 (Italy) March
9 (South Korea) Kim	+0.52
1 (Austria) Prommegger
16 (Italy) Coratti	DNF
2 (Austria) Obmann
15 (Poland) Kwiatkowski	+1.12
7 (Bulgaria) Yankov
10 (Slovenia) Košir	+1.38
6 (Austria) Auner
11 (Italy) Hofer	+0.04
3 (South Korea) Lee
14 (Switzerland) Casanova	+0.42

Quarterfinals
4 (Switzerland) Caviezel	+1.80
5 (Canada) Gaudet
8 (Italy) March	+0.55
1 (Austria) Prommegger
2 (Austria) Obmann
7 (Bulgaria) Yankov	+0.10
6 (Austria) Auner
3 (South Korea) Lee	+0.23

Semifinals
5 (Canada) Gaudet	+16.81
1 (Austria) Prommegger
2 (Austria) Obmann	+0.40
6 (Austria) Auner

Final
1 (Austria) Prommegger
6 (Austria) Auner	+0.44
Third place
5 (Canada) Gaudet
2 (Austria) Obmann	+0.63
