= FIS Freestyle Ski and Snowboarding World Championships 2023 – Men's parallel giant slalom =

Men's parallel giant slalom at the FIS Freestyle Ski and Snowboarding World Championships 2023
- Location: Bakuriani, Georgia
- Date: 19 February
- Competitors: 48 from 14 nations

Medalists
gold medal	Oskar Kwiatkowski	Poland
silver medal	Dario Caviezel	Switzerland
bronze medal	Alexander Payer	Austria

The Men's parallel giant slalom competition at the FIS Freestyle Ski and Snowboarding World Championships 2023 was held on 19 February 2023.

== Qualification ==
The qualification was started at 09:00. After the first run, the top 16 snowboarders on each course were allowed a second run on the opposite course.

Rank	Bib	Name	Country	Blue course	Red course	Total	Notes
1	19	Maurizio Bormolini	Italy	38.70	36.64	1:15.34	Q
2	21	Oskar Kwiatkowski	Poland	37.38	38.23	1:15.61	Q
3	31	Fabian Obmann	Austria	38.10	37.53	1:15.63	Q
4	28	Dario Caviezel	Switzerland	36.81	39.00	1:15.81	Q
5	26	Andreas Prommegger	Austria	36.87	39.34	1:16.21	Q
6	32	Benjamin Karl	Austria	37.68	38.67	1:16.35	Q
7	17	Kim Sang-kyum	South Korea	38.40	38.01	1:16.41	Q
8	18	Alexander Payer	Austria	36.84	39.74	1:16.58	Q
9	20	Lee Sang-ho	South Korea	36.63	40.28	1:16.91	Q
10	23	Žan Košir	Slovenia	39.19	37.77	1:16.96	Q
11	22	Tim Mastnak	Slovenia	37.18	39.79	1:16.97	Q
12	34	Elias Huber	Germany	38.45	38.85	1:17.30	Q
13	41	Arnaud Gaudet	Canada	38.96	38.61	1:17.57	Q
14	39	Gian Casanova	Switzerland	39.13	38.52	1:17.65	Q
15	35	Masaki Shiba	Japan	38.50	39.26	1:17.76	Q
16	40	Ole Mikkel Prantl	Germany	38.26	39.51	1:17.77	Q
17	24	Aaron March	Italy	38.17	39.64	1:17.81	
18	25	Roland Fischnaller	Italy	41.20	36.81	1:18.01	
19	33	Michał Nowaczyk	Poland	38.59	39.65	1:18.24	
19	38	Rok Marguč	Slovenia	38.74	39.50	1:18.24	
21	43	Darren Gardner	Canada	38.47	40.00	1:18.47	
22	47	Cho Wan-hee	South Korea	39.53	39.05	1:18.58	
23	44	Qin Zihan	China	38.85	40.46	1:19.31	
24	42	Cody Winters	United States	38.27	42.00	1:20.27	
25	46	Hong Seung-yeong	South Korea	39.12	41.46	1:20.58	
26	37	Ben Heldman	Canada	41.20	39.56	1:20.76	
27	45	Mykhailo Kharuk	Ukraine	41.75	39.05	1:20.80	
28	49	Matej Bačo	Slovakia	40.41	40.62	1:21.03	
29	50	Daichi Shimizu	Japan	39.57	41.51	1:21.08	
30	36	Yannik Angenend	Germany	38.97	48.58	1:27.55	
31	30	Stefan Baumeister	Germany	37.37	DNF	—	
32	27	Radoslav Yankov	Bulgaria	DSQ	37.26	—	
33	48	Dylan Udolf	United States	40.38		—	
34	51	Jamie Behan	Canada		40.74	—	
35	52	Ryan Rosencranz	United States	41.03		—	
36	58	Steven MacCutcheon	United States	41.34		—	
37	53	Oleksandr Belinskyi	Ukraine		41.36	—	
38	29	Mirko Felicetti	Italy		41.41	—	
39	60	Revaz Nazgaidze	Georgia	41.44		—	
40	54	Vasyl Kasheliuk	Ukraine	41.66		—	
41	57	Mikołaj Rutkowski	Poland		43.19	—	
42	59	Adam Počinek	Czech Republic		43.48	—	
43	64	Vladislav Zuyev	Kazakhstan	44.10		—	
44	56	Shogo Suminaga	Japan	44.20		—	
45	63	Stanislav Hachak	Ukraine		44.33	—	
46	62	Ioannis Doumas	Greece	52.04		—	
	61	Kryštof Minárik	Czech Republic	DSQ		—	
	55	Ryusuke Shinohara	Japan	DSQ		—	

== Elimination round ==
The 16 best racers advanced to the elimination round.

Round of 16
4 (Switzerland) Caviezel
13 (Canada) Gaudet	+1.41
5 (Austria) Prommegger
12 (Germany) Elias Huber	DNF
8 (Austria) Payer
9 (South Korea) Lee	+1.11
1 (Italy) Bormolini
16 (Germany) Prantl	DNF
2 (Poland) Kwiatkowski
15 (Japan) Shiba	DNF
7 (South Korea) Kim
10 (Slovenia) Košir	DNF
6 (Austria) Karl
11 (Slovenia) Mastnak	+0.13
3 (Austria) Obmann	+0.22
14 (Switzerland) Casanova

Quarterfinals
4 (Switzerland) Caviezel
5 (Austria) Prommegger	DNF
8 (Austria) Payer
1 (Italy) Bormolini	DNF
2 (Poland) Kwiatkowski
7 (South Korea) Kim	+0.14
6 (Austria) Karl
14 (Switzerland) Casanova	+1.31

Semifinals
4 (Switzerland) Caviezel
8 (Austria) Payer	+0.35
2 (Poland) Kwiatkowski
6 (Austria) Karl	+0.23

Final
4 (Switzerland) Caviezel	+0.26
2 (Poland) Kwiatkowski
Third place
8 (Austria) Payer
6 (Austria) Karl	+0.05
