= Snowboarding at the 2026 Winter Olympics – Men's parallel giant slalom =

Men's parallel giant slalom at the XXV Olympic Winter Games
- Snowboarding
- Venue: Livigno Snow Park, Valtellina
- Date: 8 February

Medalists
1st place, gold medalist(s)		Benjamin Karl	Austria
2nd place, silver medalist(s)		Kim Sang-kyum	South Korea
3rd place, bronze medalist(s)		Tervel Zamfirov	Bulgaria

The men's parallel giant slalom competition in snowboarding at the 2026 Winter Olympics will be held on 8 February, at the Livigno Snow Park in Valtellina. The event was won by the defending champion, Benjamin Karl of Austria. Kim Sang-kyum of South Korea won silver, and Tervel Zamfirov of Bulgaria won bronze. These were the first Olympic medals for Kim and Zamfirov, as well as the first Olympic medal in snowboarding for Bulgaria.

== Background ==
The 2022 champion, Benjamin Karl, and the silver medalist, Tim Mastnak, qualified for the event. The bronze medalist, Vic Wild, retired from competitions. Roland Fischnaller was leading the 2025–26 FIS Snowboard World Cup standings in men's parallel giant slalom, and Maurizio Bormolini in parallel slalom. The 2025 World champion in parallel giant slalom was Roland Fischnaller.

== Summary ==
Fischnaller, who won the qualification and 1/8 finals, made a mistake in his quarterfinal and did not finish the run. Teammate Aaron March, who was second in qualification, lost to Tim Mastnak in 1/8 finals. The semifinals set Tervel Zamfirov against Kim Sang-kyum and Mastnak against Karl. Karl and Kim won their semifinals. In the bronze final, Zamfirov and Mastnak finished almost simultaneously. A photo finish decided that the Bulgarian crossed the line just fractions earlier. In the final Karl beat Kim to defend his olympic title.

== Results ==
=== Qualification run ===
Rank	Bib	Name	Country	Blue course	Red course	Total	Notes
1	27	Roland Fischnaller	Italy	42.74	42.39	1:25.13	Q
2	18	Aaron March	Italy	42.74	43.34	1:26.08	Q
3	17	Benjamin Karl	Austria	43.49	43.00	1:26.49	Q
4	34	Arnaud Gaudet	Canada	42.93	43.64	1:26.57	Q
5	25	Tervel Zamfirov	Bulgaria	43.66	42.92	1:26.58	Q
6	28	Lee Sang-ho	South Korea	43.21	43.53	1:26.74	Q
7	32	Dario Caviezel	Switzerland	43.10	43.75	1:26.85	Q
8	30	Kim Sang-kyum	South Korea	43.74	43.44	1:27.18	Q
9	35	Žan Košir	Slovenia	44.32	43.01	1:27.33	Q
10	31	Mirko Felicetti	Italy	44.12	43.25	1:27.37	Q
11	29	Andreas Prommegger	Austria	43.36	44.04	1:27.40	Q
12	22	Elias Huber	Germany	44.06	43.38	1:27.44	Q
13	23	Radoslav Yankov	Bulgaria	43.60	43.84	1:27.44	Q
14	21	Maurizio Bormolini	Italy	43.55	43.92	1:27.47	Q
15	24	Tim Mastnak	Slovenia	43.60	43.88	1:27.48	Q
16	41	Rok Marguč	Slovenia	43.87	43.69	1:27.56	Q
17	20	Alexander Payer	Austria	43.48	44.23	1:27.71	
18	19	Stefan Baumeister	Germany	43.63	44.13	1:27.76	
18	42	Cho Wan-hee	South Korea	43.72	44.04	1:27.76	
20	26	Fabian Obmann	Austria	44.35	43.62	1:27.97	
21	43	Cody Winters	United States	43.53	44.46	1:27.99	
22	33	Gian Casanova	Switzerland	44.39	43.67	1:28.06	
23	44	Michał Nowaczyk	Poland	44.58	43.50	1:28.08	
24	47	Max Kühnhauser	Germany	43.94	44.17	1:28.11	
25	36	Yannik Angenend	Germany	43.40	44.73	1:28.13	
26	39	Ben Heldman	Canada	44.13	44.03	1:28.16	
27	40	Bi Ye	China	44.72	43.76	1:28.48	
28	38	Oskar Kwiatkowski	Poland	43.68	45.02	1:28.70	
29	48	Ban Xuefu	China	44.69	44.64	1:29.33	
30	45	Krystof Minarik	Czech Republic	44.20	45.55	1:29.75	
31	46	Alexander Krashniak	Bulgaria	46.91	45.36	1:32.27	
	37	Masaki Shiba	Japan	DSQ	DSQ		

=== Final ===
1/8 finals
4 Gaudet (CAN)
13 Yankov (BUL)	+0.11
5 Zamfirov (BUL)
12 Huber (GER)	+0.03
8 Kim (KOR)
9 Košir (SLO)	DNF
1 Fischnaller (ITA)
16 Marguč (SLO)	+0.59
2 March (ITA)	+0.06
15 Mastnak (SLO)
7 Caviezel (SUI)	+0.21
10 Felicetti (ITA)
6 Lee (KOR)	+0.17
11 Prommegger (AUT)
3 Karl (AUT)
14 Bormolini (ITA)	+0.03

Quarterfinals
4 Gaudet (CAN)	+0.03
5 Zamfirov (BUL)
8 Kim (KOR)
1 Fischnaller (ITA)	DNF
15 Mastnak (SLO)
10 Felicetti (ITA)	DNF
11 Prommegger (AUT)	+0.12
3 Karl (AUT)

Semifinals
5 Zamfirov (BUL)	+0.23
8 Kim (KOR)
15 Mastnak (SLO)	+0.24
3 Karl (AUT)

Final
8 Kim (KOR)	+0.19
3 Karl (AUT)
Third place
5 Zamfirov (BUL)
15 Mastnak (SLO)	+0.00 (Photo Finish)
