= FIS Freestyle Ski and Snowboarding World Championships 2021 – Men's parallel slalom =

Men's parallel slalom at the FIS Freestyle Ski and Snowboarding World Championships 2021
- Location: Rogla, Slovenia
- Date: 2 March
- Competitors: 57 from 23 nations

Medalists
gold medal	Benjamin Karl	Austria
silver medal	Andreas Prommegger	Austria
bronze medal	Dmitry Loginov

The Men's parallel slalom competition at the FIS Freestyle Ski and Snowboarding World Championships 2021 was held on 2 March 2021.

== Qualification ==
The qualification was started at 09:35. After the first run, the top 16 snowboarders on each course were allowed a second run on the opposite course.

Rank	Bib	Name	Country	Blue course	Red course	Total	Notes
1	24	Andrey Sobolev	Russian Ski Federation	27.01	27.28	54.29	Q
2	30	Dmitry Loginov	Russian Ski Federation	27.76	26.88	54.64	Q
3	17	Andreas Prommegger	Austria	28.03	26.98	55.01	Q
4	36	Nevin Galmarini	Switzerland	27.55	27.55	55.10	Q
5	22	Alexander Payer	Austria	27.58	27.58	55.16	Q
6	34	Lee Sang-ho	South Korea	27.22	28.03	55.28	Q
7	28	Maurizio Bormolini	Italy	27.54	27.80	55.34	Q
8	47	Michał Nowaczyk	Poland	27.81	27.59	55.40	Q
9	23	Aaron March	Italy	28.12	27.34	55.46	Q
10	40	Oskar Kwiatkowski	Poland	27.87	27.66	55.53	Q
11	33	Radoslav Yankov	Bulgaria	28.30	27.28	55.58	Q
12	20	Benjamin Karl	Austria	27.47	28.11	55.58	Q
13	18	Dario Caviezel	Switzerland	27.49	28.16	55.65	Q
14	25	Dmitry Sarsembaev	Russian Ski Federation	28.38	27.29	55.67	Q
15	41	Cody Winters	United States	28.41	27.39	55.80	Q
16	38	Kim Sang-kyum	South Korea	28.18	27.67	55.85	Q
17	37	Tim Mastnak	Slovenia	28.10	27.81	55.91	
17	35	Arnaud Gaudet	Canada	28.09	27.82	55.91	
19	21	Žan Košir	Slovenia	28.59	27.42	56.01	
20	32	Stefan Baumeister	Germany	28.27	27.95	56.22	
21	39	Darren Gardner	Canada	27.97	28.30	56.27	
22	29	Dmitriy Karlagachev	Russian Ski Federation	29.27	27.07	56.34	
23	49	Elias Huber	Germany	28.43	27.92	56.35	
24	56	Choi Bo-gun	South Korea	28.57	27.89	56.46	
25	53	Sébastien Beaulieu	Canada	28.80	27.77	56.57	
26	46	Jules Lefebvre	Canada	28.77	27.81	56.58	
27	19	Lukas Mathies	Austria	28.71	27.90	56.61	
28	42	Rok Marguč	Slovenia	27.76	28.95	56.71	
29	43	Sylvain Dufour	France	28.47	28.25	56.72	
30	50	Ole Mikkel Prantl	Germany	28.63	28.30	56.93	
31	52	Gian Casanova	Switzerland	28.64	28.71	57.35	
32	27	Edwin Coratti	Italy	DSQ	27.06		
33	51	Yannik Angenend	Germany		28.43		
34	67	Christian de Oliveira	Portugal		28.73		
35	48	Mykhailo Kharuk	Ukraine	29.11			
36	31	Igor Sluev	Russian Ski Federation		29.22		
37	62	Jernej Glavan	Slovenia	29.33			
38	61	Cho Wan-hee	South Korea		29.42		
39	63	Stanislav Hachak	Ukraine		29.56		
40	58	Vasyl Kasheliuk	Ukraine	29.66			
41	55	Ryan Rosencranz	United States		29.83		
42	54	Masaki Shiba	Japan	30.14			
43	59	Revaz Nazgaidze	Georgia		30.84		
44	66	Vladislav Zuyev	Kazakhstan	31.05			
45	57	Rollan Sadykov	Kazakhstan		31.41		
46	65	Andrii Kabaliuk	Ukraine		31.71		
47	71	Uğur Koçak	Turkey		31.99		
48	68	Adam Počinek	Czech Republic	32.12			
49	64	Viktor Brůžek	Czech Republic	32.51			
50	73	Emre Boydak	Turkey		32.71		
51	60	Matej Bačo	Slovakia	33.53			
52	70	Endre Papp	Hungary	33.64			
53	69	Aleksandar Kacarski	North Macedonia		35.71		
	72	Ioannis Doumos	Greece	DNF			
	45	Shinnosuke Kamino	Japan		DNF		
	44	Robert Burns	United States	DNF			
	26	Daniele Bagozza	Italy	DNF			

== Elimination round ==
The 16 best racers advanced to the elimination round.

1/8 finals
4	(Switzerland) Nevin Galmarini	DNF
13	(Switzerland) Dario Caviezel
5	(Austria) Alexander Payer	+0.09
12	(Austria) Benjamin Karl
8	(Poland) Michał Nowaczyk
9	(Italy) Aaron March	+0.05
1	(Russia) Andrey Sobolev
16	(South Korea) Kim Sang-kyum	+0.17
2	(Russia) Dmitry Loginov
15	(United States) Cody Winters	DNF
7	(Italy) Maurizio Bormolini	DNF
10	(Poland) Oskar Kwiatkowski
6	(South Korea) Lee Sang-ho
11	(Bulgaria) Radoslav Yankov	+0.49
3	(Austria) Andreas Prommegger
14	(Russia) Dmitry Sarsembaev	+0.45

Quarterfinals
13	(Switzerland) Dario Caviezel	+0.16
12	(Austria) Benjamin Karl
8	(Poland) Michał Nowaczyk	+0.08
1	(Russia) Andrey Sobolev
2	(Russia) Dmitry Loginov
10	(Poland) Oskar Kwiatkowski	+0.41
6	(South Korea) Lee Sang-ho	+0.04
3	(Austria) Andreas Prommegger

Semifinals
12	(Austria) Benjamin Karl
1	(Russia) Andrey Sobolev	+0.03
2	(Russia) Dmitry Loginov	DNF
3	(Austria) Andreas Prommegger

Final
12	(Austria) Benjamin Karl
3	(Austria) Andreas Prommegger	+0.09
Third place
1	(Russia) Andrey Sobolev	+0.02
2	(Russia) Dmitry Loginov
