= FIS Freestyle Ski and Snowboarding World Championships 2025 – Men's parallel giant slalom =

Men's parallel giant slalom at the FIS Freestyle Ski and Snowboarding World Championships 2025
- Location: Corviglia, Switzerland
- Date: 20 March
- Competitors: 58 from 23 nations

Medalists
gold medal	Roland Fischnaller	Italy
silver medal	Stefan Baumeister	Germany
bronze medal	Lee Sang-ho	South Korea

The Men's parallel giant slalom competition at the FIS Freestyle Ski and Snowboarding World Championships 2025 was held on 20 March 2025.

== Qualification ==
The qualification was started at 09:30. After the first run, the top 16 snowboarders on each course were allowed a second run on the opposite course.

Rank	Bib	Name	Country	Blue course	Red course	Total	Notes
1	30	Lee Sang-ho	South Korea	42.39	43.49	1:25.88	Q
2	23	Roland Fischnaller	Italy	43.29	43.19	1:26.48	Q
3	31	Dario Caviezel	Switzerland	43.50	43.25	1:26.75	Q
4	18	Benjamin Karl	Austria	43.36	43.74	1:27.10	Q
5	21	Tim Mastnak	Slovenia	43.58	43.56	1:27.14	Q
6	32	Alexander Payer	Austria	43.24	43.91	1:27.15	Q
7	29	Maurizio Bormolini	Italy	44.46	42.86	1:27.32	Q
8	20	Andreas Prommegger	Austria	43.59	43.73	1:27.32	Q
9	17	Tervel Zamfirov	Bulgaria	44.00	43.58	1:27.58	Q
10	28	Elias Huber	Germany	43.41	44.26	1:27.67	Q
11	27	Mirko Felicetti	Italy	44.38	43.30	1:27.68	Q
12	34	Stefan Baumeister	Germany	43.84	43.84	1:27.68	Q
13	40	Cody Winters	United States	43.93	43.91	1:27.84	Q
14	24	Žan Košir	Slovenia	43.63	44.28	1:27.91	Q
15	26	Kim Sang-kyum	South Korea	44.10	43.90	1:28.00	Q
16	22	Edwin Coratti	Italy	44.04	43.99	1:28.03	Q
17	46	Ban Xuefu	China	43.94	44.13	1:28.07	
18	37	Masaki Shiba	Japan	43.75	44.57	1:28.32	
19	25	Ben Heldman	Canada	44.46	43.97	1:28.43	
20	33	Arnaud Gaudet	Canada	44.77	43.77	1:28.54	
21	35	Gian Casanova	Switzerland	44.35	44.30	1:28.65	
22	36	Bi Ye	China	44.46	44.45	1:28.91	
23	49	Kristian Georgiev	Bulgaria	44.59	44.82	1:29.41	
24	52	Sun Huan	China	44.74	44.91	1:29.65	
25	38	Ole-Mikkel Prantl	Germany	45.02	44.77	1:29.79	
26	41	Rok Marguč	Slovenia	45.10	44.77	1:29.87	
27	51	Petar Gergyovski	Bulgaria	45.17	44.97	1:30.14	
28	45	Mykhailo Kharuk	Ukraine	46.83	45.96	1:32.79	
29	42	Kryštof Minárik	Czech Republic	44.68	49.57	1:34.25	
30	19	Fabian Obmann	Austria	DNF	44.17	—	
31	39	Yannik Angenend	Germany	DNF	44.51	—	
32	44	Alexander Krashniak	Bulgaria	44.92	DNF	—	
33	47	Ma Jun-ho	South Korea		46.06	—	
34	43	Michał Nowaczyk	Poland		46.09	—	
35	55	Adam Počinek	Czech Republic		46.13	—	
36	50	Walker Overstake	United States	46.50		—	
37	62	Mykhailo Kabaliuk	Ukraine	46.65		—	
38	58	Andrzej Gąsienica-Daniel	Poland	46.69		—	
39	56	Filip Mareš	Czech Republic	46.71		—	
40	48	Hong Seung-yeong	South Korea	46.76		—	
41	57	Harvey Edmanson	Australia		47.25	—	
42	64	Andrii Kabaliuk	Ukraine	47.34		—	
43	61	Mikołaj Rutkowski	Poland		47.38	—	
44	59	Anatol Kulpiński	Poland		47.50	—	
45	63	Revaz Nazgaidze	Georgia		47.71	—	
46	65	Ömer Faruk Keleşoğlu	Turkey		49.25	—	
47	73	Emre Boydak	Turkey		49.66	—	
48	66	Ioannis Doumos	Greece	50.53		—	
49	71	Uğur Koçak	Turkey		51.58	—	
50	60	Oleksandr Popadych	Ukraine	51.61		—	
51	70	Marcell Szabó	Hungary	52.32		—	
52	72	Ganbaataryn Ganzorig	Mongolia	54.84		—	
53	74	Norik Tadevosyan	Armenia	58.24		—	
54	67	Aleksandar Kacarski	North Macedonia		59.87	—	
55	69	Mehraj Ud Din Khan	India		1:00.54	—	
	54	Dylan Udolf	United States	DNF		—	
	68	Mert Derviş Yıldırım	Turkey	DNF		—	
	53	Robert Burns	United States		DSQ	—	

== Elimination round ==
The 16 best racers advanced to the elimination round.

Round of 16
4 (Austria) Karl	+0.27
13 (United States) Winters
5 (Slovenia) Mastnak	+0.20
12 (Germany) Baumeister
8 (Austria) Prommegger
9 (Bulgaria) Zamfirov	+0.10
1 (South Korea) Lee
16 (Italy) Coratti	+0.51
2 (Italy) Fischnaller
15 (South Korea) Kim	+0.21
7 (Italy) Bormolini
10 (Germany) Huber	DNF
6 (Austria) Payer	DNF
11 (Italy) Felicetti
3 (Switzerland) Caviezel
14 (Slovenia) Košir	+0.30

Quarterfinals
13 (United States) Winters	DNF
12 (Germany) Baumeister
8 (Austria) Prommegger	DNF
1 (South Korea) Lee
2 (Italy) Fischnaller
7 (Italy) Bormolini	+0.28
11 (Italy) Felicetti	+0.02
3 (Switzerland) Caviezel

Semifinals
12 (Germany) Baumeister
1 (South Korea) Lee	+0.23
2 (Italy) Fischnaller
3 (Switzerland) Caviezel	+0.34

Final
12 (Germany) Baumeister	+0.09
2 (Italy) Fischnaller
Third place
1 (South Korea) Lee
3 (Switzerland) Caviezel	DSQ
