= FIS Freestyle Ski and Snowboarding World Championships 2025 – Men's parallel slalom =

Men's parallel slalom at the FIS Freestyle Ski and Snowboarding World Championships 2025
- Location: Corviglia, Switzerland
- Date: 22 March
- Competitors: 59 from 23 nations

Medalists
gold medal	Tervel Zamfirov	Bulgaria
silver medal	Arvid Auner	Austria
bronze medal	Aaron March	Italy

The Men's parallel slalom competition at the FIS Freestyle Ski and Snowboarding World Championships 2025 was held on 22 March 2025.

== Qualification ==
The qualification was started at 09:40. After the first run, the top 16 snowboarders on each course were allowed a second run on the opposite course.

Rank	Bib	Name	Country	Blue course	Red course	Total	Notes
1	17	Maurizio Bormolini	Italy	34.27	31.62	1:05.89	Q
2	46	Tervel Zamfirov	Bulgaria	34.04	33.19	1:07.23	Q
3	22	Aaron March	Italy	32.91	34.41	1:07.32	Q
4	20	Arvid Auner	Austria	32.29	35.06	1:07.35	Q
5	21	Cody Winters	United States	35.61	31.97	1:07.58	Q
6	23	Tim Mastnak	Slovenia	35.67	31.97	1:07.64	Q
7	32	Stefan Baumeister	Germany	34.10	33.81	1:07.91	Q
8	30	Andreas Prommegger	Austria	33.67	34.36	1:08.03	Q
9	41	Kryštof Minárik	Czech Republic	35.00	33.07	1:08.07	Q
10	25	Elias Huber	Germany	34.53	33.74	1:08.27	Q
11	26	Lee Sang-ho	South Korea	33.82	34.45	1:08.27	Q
12	31	Benjamin Karl	Austria	34.56	33.75	1:08.31	Q
13	29	Dario Caviezel	Switzerland	34.89	33.44	1:08.33	Q
14	34	Ben Heldman	Canada	33.67	34.96	1:08.63	Q
15	38	Ole-Mikkel Prantl	Germany	33.81	34.82	1:08.63	Q
16	28	Arnaud Gaudet	Canada	33.47	35.36	1:08.83	Q
17	36	Masaki Shiba	Japan	35.21	33.94	1:09.15	
18	33	Žan Košir	Slovenia	35.64	33.57	1:09.21	
19	51	Hong Seung-yeong	South Korea	34.15	35.08	1:09.23	
20	24	Gabriel Messner	Italy	32.25	37.09	1:09.34	
21	39	Gian Casanova	Switzerland	34.98	34.46	1:09.44	
22	44	Yannik Angenend	Germany	35.15	34.45	1:09.60	
23	35	Bi Ye	China	36.71	33.16	1:09.87	
24	37	Kim Sang-kyum	South Korea	36.07	34.06	1:10.13	
25	56	Michał Nowaczyk	Poland	34.93	35.21	1:10.14	
26	27	Matthaeus Pink	Austria	37.65	32.59	1:10.24	
27	45	Mykhailo Kharuk	Ukraine	35.51	34.85	1:10.36	
28	40	Rok Marguč	Slovenia	34.53	36.02	1:10.55	
29	48	Sun Huan	China	35.08	35.70	1:10.78	
30	47	Walker Overstake	United States	37.14	34.26	1:11.40	
31	19	Alexander Payer	Austria	DSQ	32.15	DSQ	
32	18	Daniele Bagozza	Italy	33.04	DSQ	DSQ	
34	43	Ban Xuefu	China		35.33		
33	54	Alexander Krashniak	Bulgaria	35.31			
35	58	Harvey Edmanson	Australia	35.55			
36	63	Mykhailo Kabaliuk	Ukraine		35.70		
37	50	Ma Jun-ho	South Korea	35.75			
38	60	Anatol Kulpiński	Poland	35.94			
39	52	Ryan Rosencranz	United States	36.08			
40	61	Oleksandr Popadych	Ukraine		37.02		
41	64	Revaz Nazgaidze	Georgia	37.12			
42	74	Emre Boydak	Turkey	38.27			
43	71	Marcell Szabó	Hungary		38.69		
44	66	Ömer Faruk Keleşoğlu	Turkey	39.25			
45	72	Uğur Koçak	Turkey	40.17			
47	69	Mert Derviş Yıldırım	Turkey		47.23		
48	65	Andrii Kabaliuk	Ukraine		53.09		
49	75	Norik Tadevosyan	Armenia		55.28		
50	73	Ganbaataryn Ganzorig	Mongolia		56.16		
	68	Aleksandar Kacarski	North Macedonia	DNF			
	55	Adam Počinek	Czech Republic		DNF		
	42	Petar Gergyovski	Bulgaria	DNF			
	67	Ioannis Doumos	Greece		DSQ		
	62	Mikołaj Rutkowski	Poland	DSQ			
	59	Andrzej Gąsienica-Daniel	Poland		DSQ		
	57	Filip Mareš	Czech Republic		DSQ		
	49	Kristian Georgiev	Bulgaria		DSQ		
	53	Dylan Udolf	United States	Did not start			

== Elimination round ==
The 16 best racers advanced to the elimination round.

Round of 16
4 (Austria) Auner
13 (Switzerland) Caviezel	DNF
5 (United States) Winters
12 (Austria) Karl	+0.12
8 (Austria) Prommegger
9 (South Korea) Minárik	DNF
1 (Italy) Bormolini	+0.38
16 (Canada) Gaudet
2 (Bulgaria) Zamfirov
15 (Germany) Prantl	+0.09
7 (Germany) Baumeister
10 (Germany) Huber	+0.02
6 (Slovenia) Mastnak	+0.13
11 (South Korea) Lee
3 (Italy) March
14 (Canada) Heldman	+0.84

Quarterfinals
4 (Austria) Auner
5 (United States) Winters	DNF
8 (Austria) Prommegger
16 (Canada) Gaudet	+0.22
2 (Bulgaria) Zamfirov
7 (Germany) Baumeister	+0.11
11 (South Korea) Lee	+0.49
3 (Italy) March

Semifinals
4 (Austria) Auner
8 (Austria) Prommegger	+0.63
2 (Bulgaria) Zamfirov
3 (Italy) March	+0.13

Final
4 (Austria) Auner	+0.40
2 (Bulgaria) Zamfirov
Third place
8 (Austria) Prommegger	+0.03
3 (Italy) March
