= Snowboarding at the 2022 Winter Olympics – Men's parallel giant slalom =

Men's parallel giant slalom at the XXIV Olympic Winter Games
- Snowboarding
- Venue: Genting Snow Park, Zhangjiakou
- Date: 8 February
- Competitors: 31 from 12 nations

Medalists
1st place, gold medalist(s)		Benjamin Karl	Austria
2nd place, silver medalist(s)		Tim Mastnak	Slovenia
3rd place, bronze medalist(s)		Vic Wild	ROC

The men's parallel giant slalom competition in snowboarding at the 2022 Winter Olympics was held on 8 February, at the Genting Snow Park in Zhangjiakou. The event was won by Benjamin Karl of Austria, the 2010 silver and 2014 bronze medalist. Tim Mastnak of Slovenia won silver, his first Olympic medal. Vic Wild, the 2014 champion, representing the Russian Olympic Committee, won the bronze medal.

Nevin Galmarini was the defending champion. He did not qualify for the elimination round. The 2018 silver medalist, Lee Sang-ho, and the bronze medalist, Žan Košir, qualified for the Olympics as well. At the 2021–22 FIS Snowboard World Cup, five parallel giant slalom events were held before the Olympics. Stefan Baumeister was leading the ranking, followed by Lee and Dmitry Loginov. Loginov was the 2021 world champion, with Roland Fischnaller and Andrey Sobolev being the silver and bronze medalists, respectively.

== Qualification ==
A total of 32 snowboarders qualified to compete at the games. For an athlete to compete they must have a minimum of 100.00 FIS points on the FIS Points List on January 17, 2022 and a top 30 finish in a World Cup event or at the FIS Snowboard World Championships 2021. A country could enter a maximum of four athletes into the event.

== Results ==
=== Qualification run ===
The qualification was started at 11:07.

Rank	Bib	Name	Country	Blue course	Red course	Total	Notes
1	4	Lee Sang-ho	South Korea	39.96	40.58	1:20.54	Q
2	15	Benjamin Karl	Austria	41.21	40.04	1:21.25	Q
3	2	Andreas Prommegger	Austria	40.34	41.03	1:21.37	Q
4	10	Tim Mastnak	Slovenia	40.24	41.19	1:21.43	Q
5	20	Oskar Kwiatkowski	Poland	40.63	40.89	1:21.52	Q
6	6	Roland Fischnaller	Italy	40.25	41.34	1:21.59	Q
7	19	Michał Nowaczyk	Poland	40.92	40.72	1:21.64	Q
8	1	Dmitry Loginov	ROC	41.31	40.38	1:21.69	Q
9	21	Vic Wild	ROC	41.10	40.96	1:22.06	Q
10	5	Alexander Payer	Austria	41.26	40.84	1:22.10	Q
11	9	Žan Košir	Slovenia	41.55	40.61	1:22.16	Q
12	8	Mirko Felicetti	Italy	40.89	41.37	1:22.26	Q
13	23	Yannik Angenend	Germany	41.41	40.87	1:22.28	Q
14	13	Dario Caviezel	Switzerland	41.92	40.43	1:22.35	Q
15	22	Radoslav Yankov	Bulgaria	41.48	41.00	1:22.48	Q
16	12	Daniele Bagozza	Italy	41.18	41.30	1:22.48	Q
17	11	Edwin Coratti	Italy	41.22	41.27	1:22.49	
18	3	Stefan Baumeister	Germany	41.24	41.40	1:22.64	
19	16	Andrey Sobolev	ROC	41.39	41.48	1:22.87	
20	32	Jules Lefebvre	Canada	41.66	41.28	1:22.94	
21	14	Nevin Galmarini	Switzerland	41.17	42.27	1:23.44	
22	27	Bi Ye	China	42.10	41.43	1:23.53	
23	7	Lukas Mathies	Austria	41.66	42.09	1:23.75	
24	18	Kim Sang-kyum	South Korea	42.40	41.41	1:23.81	
25	26	Rok Marguč	Slovenia	42.29	42.09	1:24.38	
26	25	Arnaud Gaudet	Canada	42.17	42.26	1:24.43	
27	31	Sébastien Beaulieu	Canada	42.52	42.00	1:24.52	
28	30	Gian Casanova	Switzerland	42.33	42.80	1:25.13	
29	28	Cody Winters	United States	45.47	42.33	1:27.80	
30	29	Elias Huber	Germany	42.15	49.01	1:31.16	
31	24	Robert Burns	United States	46.23	49.99	1:36.22	
	17	Dmitriy Karlagachev	ROC	Did not start			

=== Elimination round ===
1/8 finals
4 Mastnak (SLO)
13 Angenend (GER)	+0.27
5 Kwiatkowski (POL)
12 Felicetti (ITA)	DNF
8 Loginov (ROC)	DNF
9 Wild (ROC)
1 Lee (KOR)
16 Bagozza (ITA)	+0.92
2 Karl (AUT)
15 Yankov (BUL)	+0.36
7 Nowaczyk (POL)	+0.09
10 Payer (AUT)
6 Fischnaller (ITA)
11 Košir (SLO)	DNF
3 Prommegger (AUT)
14 Caviezel (SUI)	+0.16

Quarterfinals
4 Mastnak (SLO)
5 Kwiatkowski (POL)	DNF
9 Wild (ROC)
1 Lee (KOR)	+0.01
2 Karl (AUT)
10 Payer (AUT)	+1.57
6 Fischnaller (ITA)
3 Prommegger (AUT)	+0.51

Semifinals
4 Mastnak (SLO)
9 Wild (ROC)	+0.48
2 Karl (AUT)
6 Fischnaller (ITA)	DNF

Final
4 Mastnak (SLO)	+0.82
2 Karl (AUT)
Third place
9 Wild (ROC)
6 Fischnaller (ITA)	DNF
