= Austria at the 2022 Winter Olympics =

- Flag of Austria
- IOC code: AUT
- NOC: Austrian Olympic Committee
- Website: www.olympia.at (in German)

in Beijing, China 4–20 February 2022
- Competitors: 105 (64 men and 41 women) in 12 sports
- Flag bearers (opening): Julia Dujmovits; Benjamin Maier
- Flag bearers (closing): Katharina Liensberger; Johannes Strolz
- Medals Ranked 7th: Gold 7 Silver 7 Bronze 4 Total 18

Winter Olympics appearances (overview)
- 1924; 1928; 1932; 1936; 1948; 1952; 1956; 1960; 1964; 1968; 1972; 1976; 1980; 1984; 1988; 1992; 1994; 1998; 2002; 2006; 2010; 2014; 2018; 2022; 2026

Austria competed at the 2022 Winter Olympics in Beijing, China, from 4 to 20 February 2022.

Julia Dujmovits and Benjamin Maier were the country's flagbearer during the opening ceremony. Meanwhile alpine skiers Katharina Liensberger and Johannes Strolz were the flagbearer during the closing ceremony.

== Medalists ==
Multiple medalists
**Name**	**Sport**	1st place, gold medalist(s)	2nd place, silver medalist(s)	3rd place, bronze medalist(s)	Total
Johannes Strolz	Alpine skiing	2	1	0	3
Manuel Fettner	Ski jumping	1	1	0	2
Katharina Liensberger	Alpine skiing	1	1	0	2
Matthias Mayer	Alpine skiing	1	0	1	2
Wolfgang Kindl	Luge	0	2	0	2
Lorenz Koller	Luge	0	1	1	2
Thomas Steu	Luge	0	1	1	2

Medals by gender
**Gender**	1st place, gold medalist(s)	2nd place, silver medalist(s)	3rd place, bronze medalist(s)	**Total**
Male	5	3	3	**11**
Female	1	3	1	**5**
Mixed	1	1	0	**2**
Total	7	7	4	18

Medals by sport
**Sport**	1st place, gold medalist(s)	2nd place, silver medalist(s)	3rd place, bronze medalist(s)	Total
Alpine skiing	3	3	1	7
Snowboarding	3	1	0	4
Ski jumping	1	1	0	2
Luge	0	2	1	3
Cross-country skiing	0	0	1	1
Nordic combined	0	0	1	1
Total	7	7	4	18

Medals by date
**Day**	**Date**	1st place, gold medalist(s)	2nd place, silver medalist(s)	3rd place, bronze medalist(s)	Total
Day 1	5 February	0	0	1	1
Day 2	6 February	0	2	0	2
Day 3	7 February	0	0	1	1
Day 4	8 February	2	1	0	3
Day 5	9 February	0	1	2	3
Day 6	10 February	2	1	0	3
Day 7	11 February	0	1	0	1
Day 8	12 February	0	0	0	0
Day 9	13 February	0	0	0	0
Day 10	14 February	1	0	0	1
Day 11	15 February	1	0	0	1
Day 12	16 February	0	1	0	1
Day 13	17 February	0	0	0	0
Day 14	18 February	0	0	0	0
Day 15	19 February	0	0	0	0
Day 16	20 February	1	0	0	1
Total		7	7	4	18

The following Austrian competitors won medals at the games. In the discipline sections below, the medalists' names are bolded.

Medal	Name	Sport	Event	Date
Gold	Matthias Mayer	Alpine skiing	Men's super-G	8 February
Gold	Benjamin Karl	Snowboarding	Men's parallel giant slalom	8 February
Gold	Alessandro Hämmerle	Snowboarding	Men's snowboard cross	10 February
Gold	Johannes Strolz	Alpine skiing	Men's combined	10 February
Gold	Stefan Kraft; Daniel Huber; Jan Hörl; Manuel Fettner	Ski jumping	Men's large hill team	14 February
Gold	Anna Gasser	Snowboarding	Women's big air	15 February
Gold	Katharina Huber; Katharina Liensberger; Katharina Truppe; Stefan Brennsteiner; Michael Matt; Johannes Strolz	Alpine skiing	Mixed team	20 February
Silver	Manuel Fettner	Ski jumping	Men's Individual normal hill	6 February
Silver	Wolfgang Kindl	Luge	Men's singles	6 February
Silver	Daniela Ulbing	Snowboarding	Women's parallel giant slalom	8 February
Silver	Katharina Liensberger	Alpine skiing	Women's slalom	9 February
Silver	Madeleine Egle; Wolfgang Kindl; Thomas Steu; Lorenz Koller	Luge	Team relay	10 February
Silver	Mirjam Puchner	Alpine skiing	Women's super-G	11 February
Silver	Johannes Strolz	Alpine skiing	Men's slalom	16 February
Bronze	Teresa Stadlober	Cross-country skiing	Women's 15 km skiathlon	5 February
Bronze	Matthias Mayer	Alpine skiing	Men's downhill	7 February
Bronze	Lukas Greiderer	Nordic combined	Individual normal hill/10 km	9 February
Bronze	Thomas Steu; Lorenz Koller	Luge	Doubles	9 February

== Competitors ==
The following is a list of the number of competitors participating at the Games per sport/discipline.

Sport	Men	Women	Total
Alpine skiing	11	11	22
Biathlon	5	5	10
Bobsleigh	8	2	10
Cross-country skiing	3	2	5
Figure skating	1	2	3
Freestyle skiing	7	6	13
Luge	7	3	10
Nordic combined	5	0	5
Skeleton	2	1	3
Ski jumping	5	4	9
Speed skating	1	1	2
Snowboarding	9	4	13
Total	64	41	105

== Alpine skiing ==
Austria qualified eleven male and eleven female alpine skiers. Otmar Striedinger was qualified and selected to the team but did not start in any races.

Men

Athlete	Event	Run 1		Run 2		Total	
Athlete	Event	Time	Rank	Time	Rank	Time	Rank
Raphael Haaser	Combined	1:44.63	10	48.64	4	2:33.27	7
Marco Schwarz	Combined	1:44.07	5	48.64	4	2:32.71	5
Johannes Strolz	Combined	1:43.87	4	47.56	1	2:31.43	1st place, gold medalist(s)
Max Franz	Downhill	—N/a				1:43:52	9
Daniel Hemetsberger	Downhill	—N/a				1:44:59	21
Vincent Kriechmayr	Downhill	—N/a				1:43:45	8
Matthias Mayer	Downhill	—N/a				1:42.85	3rd place, bronze medalist(s)
Stefan Brennsteiner	Giant slalom	1:02.97	2	1:22:01	40	2:24.98	27
Manuel Feller	Giant slalom	1:03.67	7	DNF			
Raphael Haaser	Giant slalom	1:04.99	17	1:07.40	9	2:12.39	11
Marco Schwarz	Giant slalom	1:05.04	18	1:07.43	11	2:12.47	14
Manuel Feller	Slalom	DNF		Did not advance			
Michael Matt	Slalom	54.36	7	DNF			
Marco Schwarz	Slalom	56.26	25	50.35	5	1:46.61	17
Johannes Strolz	Slalom	53.92	1	50.78	13	1:44.70	2nd place, silver medalist(s)
Max Franz	Super-G	—N/a				DNF	
Raphael Haaser	Super-G	—N/a				DNF	
Vincent Kriechmayr	Super-G	—N/a				1:20.70	5
Matthias Mayer	Super-G	—N/a				1:19.94	1st place, gold medalist(s)

Women

Athlete	Event	Run 1		Run 2		Total	
Athlete	Event	Time	Rank	Time	Rank	Time	Rank
Katharina Huber	Combined	1:35.68	19	53.12	2	2:28.80	5
Christine Scheyer	Combined	1:32.42	1	56.83	7	2:29.25	6
Ramona Siebenhofer	Combined	1:32.56	3	57.13	10	2:29.69	7
Cornelia Hütter	Downhill	—N/a				1:33.35	7
Mirjam Puchner	Downhill	—N/a				1:33.45	8
Ramona Siebenhofer	Downhill	—N/a				1:33.81	12
Tamara Tippler	Downhill	—N/a				1:34.39	19
Stephanie Brunner	Giant slalom	DNF		Did not advance			
Katharina Liensberger	Giant slalom	59.34	13	58.90	17	1:58.24	15
Ramona Siebenhofer	Giant slalom	59.86	19	DNF		—N/a	
Katharina Truppe	Giant slalom	57.86	2	58.63	14	1:56.49	4
Katharina Gallhuber	Slalom	53.40	10	53.93	25	1:47.33	14
Katharina Huber	Slalom	53.54	12	53.38	18	1:46.92	12
Katharina Liensberger	Slalom	52.83	7	52.23	2	1:45.06	2nd place, silver medalist(s)
Katharina Truppe	Slalom	DNF		Did not advance			
Cornelia Hütter	Super-G	—N/a				1:14.19	8
Mirjam Puchner	Super-G	—N/a				1:13.73	2nd place, silver medalist(s)
Ariane Rädler	Super-G	—N/a				1:15.33	20
Tamara Tippler	Super-G	—N/a				1:13.84	4

Mixed

Athlete	Event	Round of 16	Quarterfinal	Semifinal	Final / BM	
Athlete	Event	Opposition Result	Opposition Result	Opposition Result	Opposition Result	Rank
Katharina Huber; Katharina Liensberger; Katharina Truppe; Stefan Brennsteiner; Michael Matt; Johannes Strolz	Team	bye	Slovenia; W 3–1	Norway; W 2*–2	Germany; W 2*–2	1st place, gold medalist(s)

== Biathlon ==
Based on their Nations Cup rankings in the 2020–21 Biathlon World Cup and 2021–22 Biathlon World Cup, Austria has qualified a team of 5 men and 5 women.

Men

Athlete	Event	Time	Misses	Rank
Simon Eder	Individual	52:09.4	2 (0+0+1+1)	20
David Komatz	Individual	54:24.1	3 (1+0+1+1)	45
Felix Leitner	Individual	51:41.7	1 (1+0+0+0)	16
Harald Lemmerer	Individual	55:22.7	4 (0+1+2+1)	57
Simon Eder	Mass start	40:10.8	2 (2+0+0+0)	7
Felix Leitner	Mass start	43:37.9	7 (2+1+2+2)	29
Simon Eder	Pursuit	44:18.7	5 (0+2+2+1)	37
Felix Leitner	Pursuit	42:16.3	1 (0+1+0+0)	10
Simon Eder	Sprint	25:26.9	1 (0+1)	18
Patrick Jakob	Sprint	27:10.9	1 (0+1)	72
David Komatz	Sprint	27:02.5	2 (0+2)	69
Felix Leitner	Sprint	26:33.8	2 (1+1)	46
David Komatz; Simon Eder; Felix Leitner; Harald Lemmerer	Relay	1:23:31.9	2+8	10

Women

Athlete	Event	Time	Misses	Rank
Lisa Theresa Hauser	Individual	46:36.0	3 (0+1+1+1)	17
Katharina Innerhofer	Individual	48:10.0	4 (0+2+0+2)	26
Anna Juppe	Individual	52:49.7	8 (1+3+1+3)	75
Julia Schwaiger	Individual	48:42.2	3 (2+1+0+0)	31
Lisa Theresa Hauser	Mass start	42:07.6	4 (0+1+1+2)	11
Katharina Innerhofer	Mass start	42:42.7	6 (1+0+2+3)	14
Lisa Theresa Hauser	Pursuit	36:56.7	2 (0+0+1+1)	7
Katharina Innerhofer	Pursuit	38:24.7	3 (0+0+1+2)	22
Julia Schwaiger	Pursuit	40:42.2	3 (0+0+1+2)	44
Lisa Theresa Hauser	Sprint	21:31.6	0 (0+0)	4
Katharina Innerhofer	Sprint	22:26.4	2 (0+2)	21
Julia Schwaiger	Sprint	23:16.2	2 (1+1)	45
Dunja Zdouc	Sprint	25:32.1	2 (0+2)	85
Lisa Theresa Hauser; Katharina Innerhofer; Anna Juppe; Dunja Zdouc	Relay	1:15:07.6	3+7	9

Mixed

Athlete	Event	Time	Misses	Rank
Simon Eder; Lisa Theresa Hauser; Felix Leitner; Julia Schwaiger	Relay	1:09:44.2	2+13	10

== Bobsleigh ==
Based on their rankings in the 2021–22 Bobsleigh World Cup, Austria qualified 6 sleds.

Men

Athlete	Event	Run 1		Run 2		Run 3		Run 4		Total	
Athlete	Event	Time	Rank	Time	Rank	Time	Rank	Time	Rank	Time	Rank
Benjamin Maier*; Markus Sammer	Two-man	59.51	5	59.96	8	59.64	6	1:00.01	9	3:59.12	5
Markus Treichl*; Markus Glück	Two-man	1:00.42	26	1:00.52	25	1:00.66	27	Did not advance		3:01.60	26
Benjamin Maier*; Markus Sammer; Sascha Stepan; Kristian Huber	Four-man	58.76	8	59.46	11	59.17	11	1:00.10	20	3:57.49	12
Markus Treichl*; Markus Glück; Sebastian Mitterer; Robert Eckschlager	Four-man	59.53	21	1:00.07	24	59.59	21	Did not advance		2:59.19	22

Women

Athlete	Event	Run 1		Run 2		Run 3		Run 4		Total	
Athlete	Event	Time	Rank	Time	Rank	Time	Rank	Time	Rank	Time	Rank
Katrin Beierl	Monobob	1:05.39	8	1:06.00	13	1:06.57	16	1:06.56	17	4:24.52	14
Katrin Beierl*; Jennifer Onasanya	Two-woman	1:01.91	13	1:02.12	12	1:01.89	9	1:02.32	16	4:08.24	10

== Cross-country skiing ==
Austria qualified three male and four female cross-country skiers, but refused two of their female quotas.

Distance

Athlete	Event	Classical		Freestyle		Final		
Athlete	Event	Time	Rank	Time	Rank	Time	Deficit	Rank
Mika Vermeulen	Men's 15 km classical	—N/a				40:37.8	+2:43.0	23
Mika Vermeulen	Men's 30 km skiathlon	41:18.0	20	38:49.7	13	1:20:40.0	+4:30.2	16
Teresa Stadlober	Women's 10 km classical	—N/a				29:16.9	+1:10.6	9
Teresa Stadlober	Women's 30 km freestyle	—N/a				1:28:36.5	+3:42.5	11
Lisa Unterweger	Women's 10 km classical	—N/a				31:02.1	+2:55.8	31
Teresa Stadlober	Women's 15 km skiathlon	22:38.7	5	21:19.8	4	44:44.2	+30.5	3rd place, bronze medalist(s)

Sprint

Athlete	Event	Qualification		Quarterfinal		Semifinal		Final		
Athlete	Event	Time	Rank	Time	Rank	Time	Rank	Time	Deficit	Rank
Michael Föttinger	Men's Individual	2:56.58	39	Did not advance						
Benjamin Moser	Men's Individual	2:58.07	43	Did not advance						
Michael Föttinger; Benjamin Moser	Men's team	—N/a				20:07.78	4 Q	21:15.00	+1:52.01	10
Lisa Unterweger	Women's Individual	3:24.83	34	Did not advance						
Teresa Stadlober; Lisa Unterweger	Women's team	—N/a				23:08.34	3 Q	22:55.25	+45.40	6

== Figure skating ==
In the 2021 World Figure Skating Championships in Stockholm, Sweden, Austria secured one quota in the women's singles competition and one quota in pairs.

Athlete	Event	SP		FS		Total	
Athlete	Event	Points	Rank	Points	Rank	Points	Rank
Olga Mikutina	Women's singles	61.14	18	121.06	14	182.20	14
Miriam Ziegler / Severin Kiefer	Pairs	51.96	18	Did not advance			

== Freestyle skiing ==
Austria qualified 7 men and 6 women.

Freeski
Men

Athlete	Event	Qualification					Final				
Athlete	Event	Run 1	Run 2	Run 3	Total	Rank	Run 1	Run 2	Run 3	Total	Rank
Daniel Bacher	Big air	75.00	~~56.75~~	69.00	144.00	21	Did not advance				
Matěj Švancer	Big air	61.75	27.75	~~25.50~~	89.50	26	Did not advance				
Marco Ladner	Halfpipe	53.50	~~6.50~~	—N/a	53.50	17	Did not advance				
Daniel Bacher	Slopestyle	63.60	~~16.21~~	—N/a	63.60	17	Did not advance				
Matěj Švancer	Slopestyle	~~37.25~~	74.86	—N/a	74.86	9	73.05	~~31.86~~	~~49.83~~	73.05	8

Women

Athlete	Event	Qualification					Final				
Athlete	Event	Run 1	Run 2	Run 3	Total	Rank	Run 1	Run 2	Run 3	Total	Rank
Laura Wallner	Big air	59.50	9.00	~~9.00~~	68.50	23	Did not advance				
Lara Wolf	Big air	~~25.25~~	36.25	55.25	91.50	21	Did not advance				
Laura Wallner	Slopestyle	30.36	30.70	—N/a	30.70	25	Did not advance				
Lara Wolf	Slopestyle	62.56	24.38	—N/a	62.56	14	Did not advance				

Moguls

Athlete	Event	Qualification								Final											
Athlete	Event	Run 1				Run 2				Run 1				Run 2				Run 3			
Athlete	Event	Time	Points	Total	Rank	Time	Points	Total	Rank	Time	Points	Total	Rank	Time	Points	Total	Rank	Time	Points	Total	Rank
Katharina Ramsauer	Women's moguls	31.94	44.17	56.18	24	31.04	42.74	55.76	19	Did not advance											29

Ski cross

Athlete	Event	Seeding		1/8 final	Quarterfinal	Semifinal	Final	
Athlete	Event	Time	Rank	Position	Position	Position	Position	Rank
Adam Kappacher	Men's ski cross	1:13.58	25	3	Did not advance			22
Johannes Rohrweck	Men's ski cross	1:12.71	10	2 Q	2 Q	3 SF	3	7
Tristan Takats	Men's ski cross	1:13.29	19	2 Q	4	Did not advance		15
Robert Winkler	Men's ski cross	1:14.05	30	4	Did not advance			30
Christina Födermayr	Women's ski cross	1:21.02	21	3	Did not advance			22
Andrea Limbacher	Women's ski cross	1:19.69	18	2 Q	3	Did not advance		11
Katrin Ofner	Women's ski cross	1:19.95	19	2 Q	3	Did not advance		12

== Luge ==
Based on their rankings in the 2021–22 Luge World Cup, Austria qualified ten athletes and a relay team. The team consists of three athletes each in the individual events and two doubles sleds.

Men

Athlete	Event	Run 1		Run 2		Run 3		Run 4		Total	
Athlete	Event	Time	Rank	Time	Rank	Time	Rank	Time	Rank	Time	Rank
David Gleirscher	Singles	57.407	6	58.240	12	58.908	26	58.617	20	3:53.172	15
Nico Gleirscher	Singles	59.110	27	58.351	14	57.370	3	57.452	5	3:52.283	12
Wolfgang Kindl	Singles	57.110	2	57.430	1	57.117	2	57.238	2	3:48.895	2nd place, silver medalist(s)
Lorenz Koller; Thomas Steu	Doubles	58.426	3	58.639	3	—N/a				1:57.065	3rd place, bronze medalist(s)

Women

Athlete	Event	Run 1		Run 2		Run 3		Run 4		Total	
Athlete	Event	Time	Rank	Time	Rank	Time	Rank	Time	Rank	Time	Rank
Madeleine Egle	Singles	59.342	17	58.493	2	58.542	5	58.432	3	3:54.809	4
Hannah Prock	Singles	58.762	6	58.732	5	58.532	4	58.798	9	3:54.824	5
Lisa Schulte	Singles	58.523	3	59.074	12	58.646	6	58.642	6	3:54.885	6

Mixed team relay

Athlete	Event	Run 1		Run 2		Run 3		Total	
Athlete	Event	Time	Rank	Time	Rank	Time	Rank	Time	Rank
Madeleine Egle; Wolfgang Kindl; Thomas Steu / Lorenz Koller	Team relay	1:00.054	2	1:01.342	1	1:02.090	2	3:03.486	2nd place, silver medalist(s)

== Nordic combined ==
Austria qualified 5 athletes.

Athlete	Event	Ski jumping			Cross-country		Total	
Athlete	Event	Distance	Points	Rank	Time	Rank	Time	Rank
Martin Fritz	Normal hill/10 km	96.0	105.2	18	25:02.4	14	26:53.4	12
Lukas Greiderer	Normal hill/10 km	103.5	123.4	2	24:36.3	7	25:14.3	3rd place, bronze medalist(s)
Johannes Lamparter	Normal hill/10 km	100.0	116.9	5	24:12.7	3	25:16.7	4
Franz-Josef Rehrl	Normal hill/10 km	102.0	115.8	7	25:08.3	17	26:17.3	19
Lukas Greiderer	Large hill/10 km	129.0	112.8	11	25:37.1	4	27:25.1	5
Johannes Lamparter	Large hill/10 km	128.0	118.1	8	26:04.3	8	27:31.3	6
Franz-Josef Rehrl	Large hill/10 km	135.5	121.9	6	27:10.2	23	28:22.2	11
Mario Seidl	Large hill/10 km	130.0	119.5	7	27:07.5	21	28:28.5	13
Martin Fritz; Lukas Greiderer; Johannes Lamparter; Franz-Josef Rehrl	Team large hill/4 × 5 km	532.0	475.4	1	51:44.7	8	51:44.7	4

== Skeleton ==
Based on the world rankings, Austria qualified 3 sleds.

Athlete	Event	Run 1		Run 2		Run 3		Run 4		Total	
Athlete	Event	Time	Rank	Time	Rank	Time	Rank	Time	Rank	Time	Rank
Samuel Maier	Men's	1:01.36	15	1:01.13	11	1:01.05	13	1:00.95	11	4:04.49	13
Alexander Schlintner	Men's	1:01.56	16	1:01.73	19	1:01.66	19	1:01.24	14	4:06.19	17
Janine Flock	Women's	1:02.64	14	1:02.72	10	1:02.23	8	1:02.45	15	4:10.04	10

== Ski jumping ==
Austria qualified 5 men and 4 women.

Sara Marita Kramer, one of the gold medal favorites, tested positive for COVID-19 on 30 January, one day before the Austrian team was leaving to Beijing, and was not allowed to fly to China even though she had no symptoms.

Men

Athlete	Event	Qualification			First round			Final			Total	
Athlete	Event	Distance	Points	Rank	Distance	Points	Rank	Distance	Points	Rank	Points	Rank
Manuel Fettner	Normal hill	102.0	107.5	6 Q	102.5	134.5	5	104.0	136.3	1	270.8	2nd place, silver medalist(s)
Jan Hörl	Normal hill	87.0	78.5	37 Q	98.0	128.9	15	97.0	119.9	20	248.8	19
Daniel Huber	Normal hill	90.0	90.8	23 Q	96.0	128.1	19	101.5	125.5	10	253.6	13
Stefan Kraft	Normal hill	100.0	108.5	5 Q	98.0	129.2	14	99.5	128.9	6	258.1	10
Manuel Fettner	Large hill	128.0	120.5	11 Q	138.5	138.0	5	134.0	134.7	12	272.7	7
Jan Hörl	Large hill	127.0	117.0	15 Q	136.0	135.6	7	137.0	135.3	11	270.9	9
Daniel Huber	Large hill	126.0	117.7	14 Q	133.0	127.4	21	132.5	127.7	22	255.1	20
Stefan Kraft	Large hill	128.5	127.6	4 Q	131.5	127.9	19	136.5	136.2	10	264.1	13
Manuel Fettner; Jan Hörl; Daniel Huber; Stefan Kraft	Team large hill	—N/a			519.0	458.4	2	516.0	484.3	1	942.7	1st place, gold medalist(s)

Women

Athlete	Event	First round			Final			Total	
Athlete	Event	Distance	Points	Rank	Distance	Points	Rank	Points	Rank
Lisa Eder	Normal hill	92.0	92.3	15 Q	90.0	101.1	7	193.4	8
Daniela Iraschko-Stolz	Normal hill	91.5	94.1	14 Q	80.5	83.9	16	178.0	12
Eva Pinkelnig	Normal hill	87.0	83.9	18 Q	84.0	82.6	17	166.5	20
Sophie Sorschag	Normal hill	DSQ			Did not advance				

Mixed

Athlete	Event	First round			Final			Total	
Athlete	Event	Distance	Points	Rank	Distance	Points	Rank	Points	Rank
Lisa Eder; Manuel Fettner; Stefan Kraft; Daniela Iraschko-Stolz	Mixed team normal hill	299.0	370.7	6 Q	378.5	447.3	3	818.0	5

== Snowboarding ==
Austria qualified 9 men and 5 women.

Freestyle

Athlete	Event	Qualification					Final				
Athlete	Event	Run 1	Run 2	Run 3	Best	Rank	Run 1	Run 2	Run 3	Best	Rank
Clemens Millauer	Men's slopestyle	38.71	32.06	—N/a	38.71	27	Did not advance				
Anna Gasser	Women's big air	73.25	~~62.25~~	80.25	153.50	6 Q	90.00	~~86.75~~	95.50	185.50	1st place, gold medalist(s)
Anna Gasser	Women's slopestyle	50.71	75.00	—N/a	75.00	4 Q	35.01	43.58	75.33	75.33	6

Parallel

Athlete	Event	Qualification		Round of 16	Quarterfinal	Semifinal	Final	
Athlete	Event	Time	Rank	Opposition Time	Opposition Time	Opposition Time	Opposition Time	Rank
Benjamin Karl	Men's giant slalom	1:21.25	2 Q	Yankov (BUL); W	Payer (AUT); W	Fischnaller (ITA); W	Mastnak (SLO); W	1st place, gold medalist(s)
Lukas Mathies	Men's giant slalom	1:23.75	23	Did not advance				
Alexander Payer	Men's giant slalom	1:22.10	10 Q	Nowaczyk (POL); W	Karl (AUT); L +1.57	Did not advance		8
Andreas Prommegger	Men's giant slalom	1:21.37	3 Q	Caviezel (SUI); W	Fischnaller (ITA); L +0.51	Did not advance		6
Julia Dujmovits	Women's giant slalom	1:27.43	5 Q	Kummer (SUI); W	Dekker (NED); L +4.29	Did not advance		6
Daniela Ulbing	Women's giant slalom	1:27.77	7 Q	Farrell (CAN); W	Hofmeister (GER); W	Kotnik (SLO); W	Ledecká (CZE); L DNF	2nd place, silver medalist(s)

Snowboard cross

Athlete	Event	Seeding		1/8 final	Quarterfinal	Semifinal	Final	
Athlete	Event	Time	Rank	Position	Position	Position	Position	Rank
Jakob Dusek	Men's	1:17.05	3	4	Did not advance			25
Alessandro Hämmerle	Men's	1:17.24	4	2 Q	1 Q	2 Q	1	1st place, gold medalist(s)
Julian Lüftner	Men's	1:17.00	2	2 Q	1 Q	1 Q	4	4
Lukas Pachner	Men's	1:18.49	14	3	Did not advance			20
Pia Zerkhold	Women's	1:24.53	9	DNF	Did not advance			25
Alessandro Hämmerle; Pia Zerkhold	Mixed team	—N/a			4	Did not advance		=13

== Speed skating ==
Austria qualified 1 man and 1 woman.

Women

Athlete	Event	Race	
Athlete	Event	Time	Rank
Vanessa Herzog	500 m	37.28	4
Vanessa Herzog	1000 m	1:15.644	8

Mass start

Athlete	Event	Semifinal			Final		
Athlete	Event	Points	Time	Rank	Points	Time	Rank
Gabriel Odor	Men's mass start	10	7:44.28	4 Q	2	8:10.46	10
