= Snowboarding at the 2018 Winter Olympics – Men's parallel giant slalom =

Men's parallel giant slalom at the XXIII Olympic Winter Games
- Venue: Bogwang Phoenix Park
- Date: 24 February
- Competitors: 32 from 13 nations

Medalists
1st place, gold medalist(s)		Nevin Galmarini	Switzerland
2nd place, silver medalist(s)		Lee Sang-ho	South Korea
3rd place, bronze medalist(s)		Žan Košir	Slovenia

The men's parallel giant slalom competition of the 2018 Winter Olympics was held on 24 February 2018 at the Bogwang Phoenix Park in Pyeongchang, South Korea.

== Qualification ==
The top 32 athletes in the Olympic quota allocation list qualified, with a maximum of four athletes per National Olympic Committee (NOC) allowed. All athletes qualifying must also have placed in the top 30 of a FIS World Cup event or the FIS Freestyle Ski and Snowboarding World Championships 2017 during the qualification period (1 July 2016 to 21 January 2018) and also have a minimum of 100 FIS points to compete. If the host country, South Korea at the 2018 Winter Olympics did not qualify, their chosen athlete would displace the last qualified athlete, granted all qualification criterion was met.

== Results ==
=== Qualification run ===
The qualification was held at 09:27.

Rank	Bib	Name	Country	Blue course	Red course	Total	Notes
1	12	Nevin Galmarini	Switzerland	41.73	43.05	1:24.78	Q
2	20	Žan Košir	Slovenia	42.03	42.94	1:24.97	Q
3	14	Lee Sang-ho	South Korea	42.16	42.90	1:25.06	Q
4	8	Sylvain Dufour	France	41.92	43.35	1:25.27	Q
5	16	Alexander Payer	Austria	42.43	42.87	1:25.30	Q
6	5	Benjamin Karl	Austria	43.21	42.12	1:25.33	Q
7	4	Stefan Baumeister	Germany	42.07	43.30	1:25.37	Q
8	7	Roland Fischnaller	Italy	43.94	41.50	1:25.44	Q
9	19	Vic Wild	Olympic Athletes from Russia	43.50	42.01	1:25.51	Q
10	3	Sebastian Kislinger	Austria	43.47	42.12	1:25.59	Q
11	10	Andreas Prommegger	Austria	42.20	43.47	1:25.67	Q
12	6	Edwin Coratti	Italy	42.37	43.33	1:25.70	Q
13	32	Oskar Kwiatkowski	Poland	42.84	42.88	1:25.72	Q
14	9	Dmitry Sarsembaev	Olympic Athletes from Russia	43.02	42.72	1:25.74	Q
15	27	Kim Sang-kyum	South Korea	42.84	43.04	1:25.88	Q
16	26	Tim Mastnak	Slovenia	43.15	42.82	1:25.97	Q
17	11	Rok Marguč	Slovenia	43.78	42.20	1:25.98	
18	2	Andrey Sobolev	Olympic Athletes from Russia	42.35	43.64	1:25.99	
19	15	Radoslav Yankov	Bulgaria	43.48	42.56	1:26.04	
20	23	Aaron Muss	United States	44.12	41.98	1:26.10	
21	17	Kaspar Flütsch	Switzerland	43.10	43.16	1:26.26	
22	21	Dario Caviezel	Switzerland	43.69	42.70	1:26.39	
23	1	Aaron March	Italy	45.19	41.39	1:26.58	
24	22	Jasey-Jay Anderson	Canada	42.99	43.77	1:26.76	
25	24	Patrick Bussler	Germany	42.99	43.78	1:26.77	
26	25	Choi Bo-gun	South Korea	43.52	43.26	1:26.78	
27	28	Masaki Shiba	Japan	44.00	42.91	1:26.91	
28	31	Darren Gardner	Canada	43.97	42.97	1:26.94	
29	18	Mirko Felicetti	Italy	45.29	42.27	1:27.56	
30	29	Michael Trapp	United States	44.05	44.09	1:28.14	
31	30	Alexander Bergmann	Germany	46.11	43.14	1:29.25	
32	13	Dmitry Loginov	Olympic Athletes from Russia	48.68	42.32	1:31.00	

=== Elimination round ===
The 16 best racers advanced to the elimination round. During the semifinals, although the automatic sensors at the finishing line claimed Lee as the winner with the difference of 0.01 seconds, Kosir challenged the result when the photo finish seemed to show that he had crossed the finish line first. The result stood, but Kosir later went on to win bronze.

1/8 finals
4	Dufour (FRA)
13	Kwiatkowski (POL)	+0.10
5	Payer (AUT)	+0.33
12	Coratti (ITA)
8	Fischnaller (ITA)
9	Wild (OAR)	+0.93
1	Galmarini (SUI)
16	Mastnak (SLO)	+0.38
2	Košir (SLO)
15	Kim (KOR)	+1.14
7	Baumeister (GER)
10	Kislinger (AUT)	+0.22
6	Karl (AUT)
11	Prommegger (AUT)	+0.29
3	Lee (KOR)
14	Sarsembaev (OAR)	+0.54

Quarterfinals
4	Dufour (FRA)
12	Coratti (ITA)	+0.19
8	Fischnaller (ITA)	+0.06
1	Galmarini (SUI)
2	Košir (SLO)
7	Baumeister (GER)	+3.07
6	Karl (AUT)	+0.94
3	Lee (KOR)

Semifinals
4	Dufour (FRA)	DNF
1	Galmarini (SUI)
2	Košir (SLO)	+0.01
3	Lee (KOR)

Finals
1	Galmarini (SUI)
3	Lee (KOR)	+0.43
Third place
4	Dufour (FRA)	+1.49
2	Košir (SLO)
