= Snowboarding at the 2015 Winter Universiade – Men's parallel giant slalom =

The men's parallel giant slalom competition of the 2015 Winter Universiade was held at Sulayr Snowpark, Sierra Nevada, Spain at February 10, 2015.

== Results ==
=== Qualification ===
Rank	Bib	Name	Country	Blue Course	Rank	Red Course	Rank	Total	Notes
1	10	Alexander Payer	Austria	26.44	3	27.05	5	53.49	Q
2	2	Bogdan Bogdanov	Russia	25.98	2	27.72	11	53.7	Q
3	1	Daniel Weis	Germany	27.96	8	26.31	2	54.27	Q
4	14	Choi Bo-Gun	South Korea	26.98	5	27.35	7	54.33	Q
5	12	Lee Sang-Ho	South Korea	26.71	4	27.82	12	54.53	Q
6	13	Darren Gardner	Canada	28.3	14	26.25	1	54.55	Q
7	11	Radoslav Yankov	Bulgaria	28.65	17	26.36	3	55.01	Q
8	19	Vladislav Khuramshin	Russia	28.25	13	27.25	6	55.5	Q
9	15	Roman Aleksandrovskyy	Ukraine	28.07	10	27.44	9	55.51	Q
10	8	Andrzej Gąsienica-Daniel	Poland	27.72	7	27.89	13	55.61	Q
11	24	Andrey Pepelyaev	Russia	27.4	6	28.8	16	56.2	Q
12	16	Matej Bačo	Slovakia	28.06	9	28.56	14	56.62	Q
13	7	Gim Yong-Hyeon	South Korea	28.14	11	28.74	15	56.88	Q
14	3	Oskar Bom	Poland	29.47	19	27.42	8	56.89	Q
15	9	David van Wijnkoop	Switzerland	29.52	20	27.63	10	57.15	Q
16	4	Olivier Vachon	Canada	28.21	12	29.32	18	57.53	Q
17	20	Taras Bihus	Ukraine	28.66	18	29.27	17	57.93	
18	18	Andrey Nalivayko	Russia	28.61	16	30.29	20	58.9	
19	6	Sebastian Kislinger	Austria	25.63	1	33.56	28	59.19	
20	5	Tomasz Kowalczyk	Poland	32.66	25	26.57	4	59.23	
21	17	Jules Lefebvre	Canada	30.31	22	29.9	19	1:00.21	
22	27	İbrahim Ali Güzeltan	Turkey	29.92	21	30.4	21	1:00.32	
23	28	Yevheniy Huliy	Ukraine	30.58	23	30.88	24	1:01.46	
24	31	Dmitry Yegorenko	Kazakhstan	31.58	24	30.67	23	1:02.25	
25	21	Hamza Polat	Turkey	33.95	26	30.41	22	1:04.36	
26	26	Anton Karpov	Ukraine	35.97	28	30.97	25	1:06.94	
27	22	Lars de Boom	Netherlands	34.12	27	33.02	27	1:07.14	
28	30	Andris Ablaževičs	Latvia	36.34	29	31.18	26	1:07.52	
29	23	Albert Jelínek	Czech Republic	28.55	15	47.03	19	1:15.58	
	29	Ansis Blumbergs	Latvia			DSQ			DSQ
	25	Yegor Zavarzin	Kazakhstan			DSQ			DSQ

=== Elimination round ===
The 16 best racers advanced to the elimination round.

1/8 Finals
14	Choi (KOR)	Q
7	Gim (KOR)
12	Lee (KOR)	Q
16	Bačo (SVK)
19	Khuramshin (RUS)
15	Aleksandrovskyy (UKR)	Q
10	Payer (AUT)	Q
4	Vachon (CAN)
2	Bogdanov (RUS)	Q
9	van Wijnkoop (SUI)
11	Yankov (BUL)
8	Gąsienica-Daniel (POL)	Q
13	Gardner (CAN)
24	Pepelyaev (RUS)	Q
1	Weis (GER)	Q
3	Bom (POL)

Quarterfinals
14	Choi (KOR)	Q
12	Lee (KOR)
15	Aleksandrovskyy (UKR)
10	Payer (AUT)	Q
2	Bogdanov (RUS)
8	Gąsienica-Daniel (POL)	Q
24	Pepelyaev (RUS)
1	Weis (GER)	Q

Semifinals
14	Choi (KOR)	Q
10	Payer (AUT)
8	Gąsienica-Daniel (POL)
1	Weis (GER)	Q

Finals
14	Choi (KOR)	2nd place, silver medalist(s)
1	Weis (GER)	1st place, gold medalist(s)
Third place
10	Payer (AUT)	3rd place, bronze medalist(s)
8	Gąsienica-Daniel (POL)
