= Tervel Zamfirov =

Bulgarian snowboarder (born 2005)

Personal information
- Born: 22 February 2005 (age 21) Sofia, Bulgaria

Sport
- Country: Bulgaria
- Sport: Snowboard
- Event(s): Parallel slalom, parallel giant slalom
Medal record
Men's snowboarding
Representing Bulgaria
Olympic Games
Bronze medal – third place	2026 Milano Cortina	Parallel giant slalom
World Championships
Gold medal – first place	2025 Engadin	Parallel slalom
Winter Universiade
Gold medal – first place	2025 Turin	Parallel giant slalom

Tervel Zamfirov (Bulgarian: Тервел Замфиров; born 22 February 2005) is a Bulgarian snowboarder specializing in parallel slalom and parallel giant slalom disciplines.

== Career ==
In January 2025, Zamfirov competed at the 2025 Winter World University Games and won a gold medal in the parallel giant slalom event. In March 2025, he represented Bulgaria at the 2025 Snowboarding World Championships and won a gold medal in the parallel slalom event, defeating Arvid Auner by .40 seconds. He became the first Bulgarian to medal at the FIS Snowboard World Championships.

Zamfirov represented Bulgaria at the 2026 Winter Olympics and won a bronze medal in the parallel giant slalom event, defeating Tim Mastnak in a photo finish. This was the seventh Winter Olympic Games medal for Bulgaria, and the first medal won by the nation in 20 years.

== World Cup ==
=== Podiums ===
Season	Date	Location	Event	Place
2025–26	18 Jan 2026	Bansko, Bulgaria	PGS	1st

== Olympics performance ==
Event	Parallel giant slalom
(Italy) 2026 Milano Cortina	3rd

== Personal life ==
His younger sister Malena, is also an Olympic snowboarder.
