= Michael Trapp =

American snowboarder (born 1988)

Personal information
- Born: July 10, 1988 (age 38) Cape Cod, Massachusetts, U.S.
- Height: 5 ft 8 in (173 cm)
- Weight: 150 lb (68 kg)

Sport
- Country: United States
- Sport: Snowboarding

Michael Trapp (born July 10, 1988) is an American snowboarder.

He competed in the 2011, 2013, 2015 and 2017 FIS Snowboard World Championships, and in the 2018 Winter Olympics, in parallel giant slalom.
