= Fabian Obmann =

Austrian snowboarder (born 1996)

Personal information
- Born: 11 April 1996 (age 29) St. Veit an der Glan, Austria

Sport
- Country: Austria
- Sport: Snowboarding
- Event(s): Parallel slalom, parallel giant slalom

Fabian Obmann (born 11 April 1996) is an Austrian snowboarder specializing in parallel slalom and parallel giant slalom disciplines.

== Career ==
Obmann competed at the 2023 Snowboarding World Championships and finished in fourth place in the parallel slalom event, losing to Arnaud Gaudet by .63 seconds during the small final.

During the final race of the 2022–23 FIS Snowboard World Cup, Obmann earned his first career World Cup victory on 18 March 2023. With the win he earned 100 points, to defeat Maurizio Bormolini by four points in the overall rankings, and two points in the men's parallel slalom. The next day he won the mixed parallel event, along with Sabine Schöffmann.

In January 2026, he was selected to represent Austria at the 2026 Winter Olympics.
