= Arvid Auner =

Austrian snowboarder (born 1997)

Personal information
- Born: 31 January 1997 (age 29)

Sport
- Country: Austria
- Sport: Snowboard
- Event: Parallel slalom
Medal record
Men's snowboarding
Representing Austria
World Championships
Silver medal – second place	2023 Bakuriani	Parallel slalom
Silver medal – second place	2025 Engadin	Parallel slalom

Arvid Auner (born 31 January 1997) is an Austrian snowboarder specializing in parallel slalom.

== Career ==
In February 2023, Auner represented Austria at the 2023 Snowboarding World Championships and won a silver medal in the parallel slalom event.

During the 2024–25 FIS Snowboard World Cup, he won the parallel slalom crystal globe, finishing with 299 total points. He again represented Austria at the 2025 Snowboarding World Championships and won a silver medal in the parallel slalom event, finishing .40 seconds behind gold medal winner, Tervel Zamfirov.
