= Martin Nörl =

German snowboarder (born 1993)

Personal information
- Nationality: German
- Born: 12 August 1993 (age 32) Landshut, Germany
- Height: 1.80 m (5 ft 11 in)

Sport
- Sport: Snowboarding
Medal record
Men's snowboarding
Representing Germany
World Championships
Silver medal – second place	2023 Bakuriani	Snowboard cross

Martin Nörl (born 12 August 1993) is a German snowboarder. He competed in the 2018 Winter Olympics.
