= Choi Bo-gun =

South Korean snowboarder (born 1991)

Personal information
- Born: 28 August 1991 (age 34) Seoul, South Korea
- Height: 180 cm (5 ft 11 in)
- Weight: 82 kg (181 lb)

Sport
- Country: South Korea
- Sport: Snowboarding
Medal record
Men's snowboarding
Representing South Korea
Asian Winter Games
Silver medal – second place	2017 Sapporo	Giant slalom
Winter World University Games
Silver medal – second place	2015 Granada	Parallel giant slalom

Choi Bo-gun (Korean: 최보군; born 28 August 1991) is a South Korean snowboarder.

He competed in the 2009, 2011, 2013, 2015 and 2017 FIS Snowboard World Championships, and in the 2018 Winter Olympics, in parallel giant slalom.
