= FIS Freestyle Ski and Snowboarding World Championships 2023 =

International championships

- Logo of the Championships
- Host city: Bakuriani
- Country: Georgia
- Events: 30
- Opening: 19 February 2023
- Closing: 4 March 2023
- Website: Bakuriani 2023

The 2023 FIS Freestyle Ski and Snowboarding World Championships were held in Bakuriani, Georgia from 19 February to 4 March 2023. This marked the first ever snow sports World Championships to be contested in Georgia.

A total of 30 medal events were on the program, with 16 being contested in the freestyle and freeski disciplines and 14 in snowboarding.

== Host selection ==
In April 2017, the Georgian Ski Federation officially submitted a bid to host the event. In May 2018 at the annual FIS congress in Greece, Bakuriani was selected unanimously as the official host city for the event. Bakuriani was the only candidate to host the event.

== Schedule ==
30 events are held.

Q	Qualification	F	Final

Event ↓ / Date →	February															March			
Event ↓ / Date →	Sun 19		Mon 20	Tue 21		Wed 22	Thu 23		Fri 24	Sat 25		Sun 26	Mon 27		Tue 28	Wed 1	Thu 2	Fri 3	Sat 4
Freestyle skiing
Ski cross									Q			F							
Ski cross team												F							
Aerials				Q^{W}			Q^{M}	F											
Team aerials	F																		
Moguls										Q	F								
Dual moguls												F							
Slopestyle												Q^{M}	Q^{W}		F				
Halfpipe																Q			F
Big air																		Q	F
Snowboarding
Snowboard cross																F			
Snowboard cross team																	F		
Parallel giant slalom	Q	F																	
Parallel slalom				Q	F														
Parallel slalom team						F													
Slopestyle									Q^{M}				Q^{W}	F					
Halfpipe																Q		F	
Big air																	Q		F

== Medal summary ==
=== Medal table ===
Rank	Nation	Gold	Silver	Bronze	Total
1	Austria	3	6	4	13
2	Canada	3	3	3	9
2	United States	3	3	3	9
4	Switzerland	3	2	5	10
5	France	3	0	1	4
6	Norway	2	3	2	7
7	Japan	2	2	2	6
8	Sweden	2	1	2	5
9	China	2	1	1	4
10	Great Britain	2	1	0	3
11	Italy	2	0	2	4
12	Poland	1	0	1	2
13	Czech Republic	1	0	0	1
13	South Korea	1	0	0	1
15	Australia	0	4	2	6
16	Germany	0	2	0	2
17	Finland	0	1	0	1
17	New Zealand	0	1	0	1
19	Ukraine	0	0	2	2
Totals (19 entries)		30	30	30	90

=== Freestyle skiing ===
==== Men ====
Event	Gold		Silver		Bronze	
Ski cross	Simone Deromedis; Italy		Florian Wilmsmann; Germany		Erik Mobärg; Sweden	
Dual moguls	Mikaël Kingsbury; Canada		Walter Wallberg; Sweden		Matt Graham; Australia	
Aerials	Noé Roth; Switzerland	118.59	Quinn Dehlinger; United States	114.48	Yang Longxiao; China	110.18
Moguls	Mikaël Kingsbury; Canada	89.82	Matt Graham; Australia	88.90	Walter Wallberg; Sweden	88.52
Slopestyle	Birk Ruud; Norway	90.75	Christian Nummedal; Norway	87.08	Andri Ragettli; Switzerland	84.33
Halfpipe	Brendan Mackay; Canada	97.25	Jon Sallinen; Finland	95.75	Alex Ferreira; United States	93.00
Big air	Troy Podmilsak; United States	187.75	Lukas Müllauer; Austria	184.50	Birk Ruud; Norway	183.50

==== Women ====
Event	Gold		Silver		Bronze	
Ski cross	Sandra Näslund; Sweden		Katrin Ofner; Austria		Fanny Smith; Switzerland	
Dual moguls	Perrine Laffont; France		Jaelin Kauf; United States		Avital Carroll; Austria	
Aerials	Kong Fanyu; China	85.30	Danielle Scott; Australia	83.84	Anastasiya Novosad; Ukraine	82.84
Moguls	Perrine Laffont; France	87.40	Jaelin Kauf; United States	83.56	Avital Carroll; Austria	80.19
Slopestyle	Mathilde Gremaud; Switzerland	87.95	Megan Oldham; Canada	87.75	Johanne Killi; Norway	84.71
Halfpipe	Hanna Faulhaber; United States	95.75	Zoe Atkin; Great Britain	94.50	Rachael Karker; Canada	92.25
Big air	Tess Ledeux; France	186.75	Sandra Eie; Norway	175.00	Megan Oldham; Canada	174.00

==== Mixed ====
Event	Gold		Silver		Bronze	
Team aerials	United States; Ashley Caldwell; Christopher Lillis; Quinn Dehlinger	331.37	China; Kong Fanyu; Li Tianma; Yang Longxiao	320.71	Ukraine; Anastasiya Novosad; Oleksandr Okipniuk; Dmytro Kotovskyi	255.56
Team ski cross	Sweden; David Mobärg; Sandra Näslund		Canada; Reece Howden; Marielle Thompson		Italy; Federico Tomasoni; Jole Galli	

=== Snowboarding ===
==== Men ====
Games	Gold		Silver		Bronze	
Parallel giant slalom	Oskar Kwiatkowski; Poland		Dario Caviezel; Switzerland		Alexander Payer; Austria	
Parallel slalom	Andreas Prommegger; Austria		Arvid Auner; Austria		Arnaud Gaudet; Canada	
Snowboard cross	Jakob Dusek; Austria		Martin Nörl; Germany		Omar Visintin; Italy	
Slopestyle	Marcus Kleveland; Norway	87.23	Ryoma Kimata; Japan	83.45	Chris Corning; United States	82.18
Halfpipe	Chaeun Lee; South Korea	93.50	Valentino Guseli; Australia	93.00	Jan Scherrer; Switzerland	89.25
Big air	Taiga Hasegawa; Japan	177.25	Mons Røisland; Norway	157.25	Nicolas Huber; Switzerland	150.50

==== Women ====
Games	Gold		Silver		Bronze	
Parallel giant slalom	Tsubaki Miki; Japan		Daniela Ulbing; Austria		Aleksandra Król; Poland	
Parallel slalom	Julie Zogg; Switzerland		Ladina Jenny; Switzerland		Sabine Schöffmann; Austria	
Snowboard cross	Eva Adamczyková; Czech Republic		Josie Baff; Australia		Lindsey Jacobellis; United States	
Slopestyle	Mia Brookes; Great Britain	91.38	Zoi Sadowski-Synnott; New Zealand	88.78	Miyabi Onitsuka; Japan	83.05
Halfpipe	Cai Xuetong; China	90.50	Elizabeth Hosking; Canada	85.50	Mitsuki Ono; Japan	83.00
Big air	Anna Gasser; Austria	162.50	Miyabi Onitsuka; Japan	161.25	Tess Coady; Australia	153.25

==== Mixed ====
Games	Gold	Silver	Bronze
Parallel slalom team	Italy; Aaron March; Nadya Ochner	Austria; Andreas Prommegger; Sabine Schöffmann	Switzerland; Dario Caviezel; Julie Zogg
Snowboard cross team	Great Britain; Huw Nightingale; Charlotte Bankes	Austria; Jakob Dusek; Pia Zerkhold	France; Merlin Surget; Chloé Trespeuch

== See also ==
- 2022–23 FIS Freestyle Ski World Cup
- 2022–23 FIS Snowboard World Cup
