= Ben Heldman =

Canadian snowboarder (born 2002)

Personal information
- Born: January 3, 2002 (age 24) Toronto, Ontario, Canada

Sport
- Country: Canada
- Sport: Snowboarding
- Events: Parallel giant slalom, Parallel slalom
Medal record
World Junior Championships
Gold medal – first place	2022 Valmalenco	Parallel Giant Slalom
Gold medal – first place	2022 Valmalenco	Parallel Slalom

Ben Heldman (born January 3, 2002) is a Canadian snowboarder who competes internationally in the alpine snowboard discipline.

== Career ==
Heldman is a two time World Junior Champion. Heldman won both individual alpine gold medals (parallel slalom and giant slalom) at the 2022 World Junior Championships in Valmalenco, Italy.

Heldman competed in the senior level during the 2024-2025 World Cup, where he picked up a career best performance of seventh in Saint-Côme, Quebec.
