= Mirko Felicetti =

Italian snowboarder (born 1992)

Personal information
- Born: 15 July 1992 (age 33) Cavalese, Italy

Sport
- Country: Italy
- Sport: Snowboarding

Mirko Felicetti (born 15 July 1992) is an Italian snowboarder.

== Career ==
He competed in the 2015 and 2017 FIS Snowboard World Championships, and in the 2018 Winter Olympics, in parallel giant slalom.
