= Darren Gardner =

Canadian snowboarder

Personal information
- Born: May 14, 1990 (age 36) Burlington, Ontario, Canada
- Height: 185 cm (6 ft 1 in)
- Weight: 80 kg (176 lb)

Sport
- Country: Canada
- Sport: Snowboarding

Achievements and titles
- Olympic finals: 2018 Winter Olympics

Darren Gardner (born May 14, 1990) is a Canadian snowboarder, competing in the discipline of parallel giant slalom.

== Career ==
=== 2018 Winter Olympics ===
In January 2018, Gardner was named to Canada's 2018 Olympic team.
