= Edwin Coratti =

Italian snowboarder (born 1991)

Personal information
- Born: 19 June 1991 (age 33)

Sport
- Country: Italy
- Sport: Snowboarding
- Club: Fiamme Oro

Edwin Coratti (born 19 June 1991) is an Italian snowboarder.

He competed in the 2013 and 2015 FIS Snowboard World Championships, and in the 2018 Winter Olympics, in parallel giant slalom.

== Personal life ==
Coratti's sister, Jasmin, is also a snowboarder.
