= Oskar Kwiatkowski =

Polish snowboarder (born 1996)

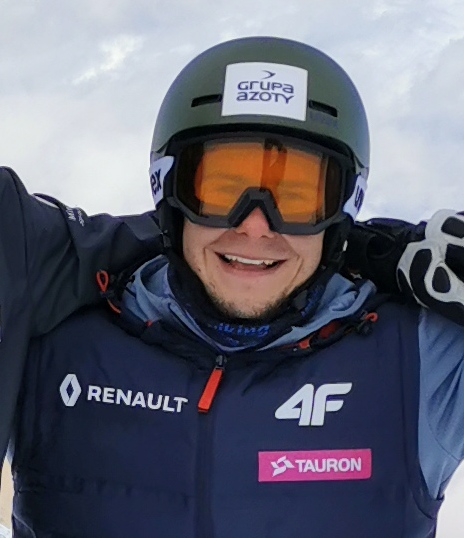
- Kwiatkowski in 2019

Personal information
- Born: 25 April 1996 (age 30) Zakopane, Poland

Sport
- Country: Poland
- Sport: Snowboarding
Medal record
Men's snowboarding
Representing Poland
World Championships
Gold medal – first place	2023 Bakuriani	Parallel giant slalom
Winter Universiade
Gold medal – first place	2019 Krasnoyarsk	Parallel giant slalom
Silver medal – second place	2017 Almaty	Parallel slalom

Oskar Kwiatkowski (born 25 April 1996) is a Polish snowboarder.

== Career ==
He made his international debut in 2012 in Kreischberg. In 2013, he won silver medal in the parallel giant slalom at the European Youth Olympic Winter Festival in Predeal, Romania.

In 2015, he finished 5th at the FIS Snowboarding Junior World Championships in Yabuli, China.

In 2016, Oskar suffered severe injuries after getting into a car crash. He recovered and returned to elite competition.

He competed in the 2017 FIS Snowboard World Championships, and in the 2018 Winter Olympics, in parallel giant slalom.

He claimed 13th place in the parallel giant slalom at the 2018 Winter Olympic Games in Pyeongchang.

In February 2023, he won a gold medal at the Snowboarding World Championships in Bakuriani, Georgia, in the parallel giant slalom, becoming the first Pole ever to win a world championship in alpine snowboarding.
