= Masaki Shiba =

Japanese snowboarder (born 1986)

Personal information
- Born: 26 April 1986 (age 39) Yamagata Prefecture, Japan

Sport
- Country: Japan
- Sport: Snowboarding

Masaki Shiba (斯波 正樹, Shiba Masaki; born 26 April 1986) is a Japanese snowboarder.

== Career ==
He competed in the 2009, 2011, 2013, 2015 and 2017 FIS Snowboard World Championships, and in the 2018 Winter Olympics, in parallel giant slalom.
