= Maurizio Bormolini =

Italian snowboarder (born 1994)

Personal information
- Born: 24 February 1994 (age 32) Tirano, Italy
- Height: 1.75 m (5 ft 9 in)
- Weight: 70 kg (154 lb)

Sport
- Sport: Snowboarding
- Event(s): Parallel slalom, parallel giant slalom
- Club: Esercito
- Coached by: Rudy Galli
Medal record
Men's snowboarding
Representing Italy
World Championships
Gold medal – first place	2025 Engadin	Mixed parallel slalom

Maurizio Bormolini (born 24 February 1994) is an Italian snowboarder specializing in parallel slalom and parallel giant slalom disciplines.

== Career ==
During the 2024–25 FIS Snowboard World Cup, Bormolini won the parallel giant slalom with 692 points, and the men's parallel overall crystal globe with 910 points. He had a career-best eight podiums during the World Cup.

Bormolini represented Italy at the 2025 Snowboarding World Championships and won a gold medal in the mixed parallel slalom event, along with Elisa Caffont.
