= Benjamin Karl =

Austrian snowboarder (born 1985)

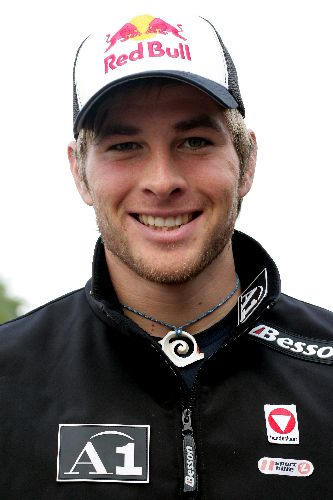

Personal information
- Full name: Benjamin Martin Karl
- Born: 16 October 1985 (age 40) Sankt Pölten, Austria
- Height: 185 cm (6 ft 1 in)
- Weight: 90 kg (198 lb)

Sport
- Country: Austria
- Sport: Snowboarding
- Event(s): Parallel giant slalom, Parallel slalom
- Club: Union Trendsport Weichberger
Medal record
Men's snowboarding
Representing Austria
Olympic Games
Gold medal – first place	2022 Beijing	Parallel giant slalom
Gold medal – first place	2026 Milano Cortina	Parallel giant slalom
Silver medal – second place	2010 Vancouver	Parallel giant slalom
Bronze medal – third place	2014 Sochi	Parallel slalom
World Championships
Gold medal – first place	2009 Gangwon	Parallel slalom
Gold medal – first place	2011 La Molina	Parallel giant slalom
Gold medal – first place	2011 La Molina	Parallel slalom
Gold medal – first place	2013 Stoneham	Parallel giant slalom
Gold medal – first place	2021 Rogla	Parallel slalom
Silver medal – second place	2017 Sierra Nevada	Parallel slalom
Silver medal – second place	2017 Sierra Nevada	Parallel giant slalom
Bronze medal – third place	2015 Kreischberg	Parallel giant slalom

Benjamin Martin Karl (born 16 October 1985) is an Austrian professional snowboarder and one of the most accomplished snowboarder racers in history. Over the course of his career, he has made over 215 World Cup starts, collecting 58 podium finishes including 27 victories, and won the overall World Cup title three times. He is a two-time Olympic gold medallist, five-time World Champion, and has been a salaried athlete of the Austrian Armed Forces since 2004. His 2026 Winter Olympics gold medal in parallel giant slalom made him the oldest male individual gold medalist in Winter Olympics history, at 40 years and 115 days of age.

== Early life and career ==
Karl grew up near the Ötscher mountain in Lower Austria. He began snowboarding in 1995, but a serious accident the same year in which he fractured three thoracic vertebrae nearly ended his career before it started. After a month of bed rest, he resumed training and won the regional cup later that year. He attended the Skihandelsschule Schladming, where he found suitable training facilities.

In the 2004–05 season, Karl won the Junior World Championship in parallel giant slalom, the overall European Cup title, and the Austrian national title in both parallel slalom and parallel giant slalom.

== Career ==
=== 2007–2011: World Cup and World Championship success ===
In the 2007–08 season, Karl won the Snowboard Overall World Cup, finishing ahead of France's Mathieu Bozzetto. At the 2009 World Championships in Gangwon, South Korea, he won gold in the parallel slalom, his first World Championship title.

At the 2010 Winter Olympics in Vancouver, Karl won the silver medal in the parallel giant slalom, finishing behind Canada's Jasey-Jay Anderson.

At the 2011 World Championships in La Molina, Spain, Karl won gold in both the parallel giant slalom and the parallel slalom, becoming double World Champion. He successfully defended his parallel slalom title from 2009.

=== 2013–2018: Further titles and Olympic bronze ===
At the 2013 World Championships in Stoneham, Canada, Karl won his fourth World Championship gold in the parallel giant slalom on 25 January 2013, becoming the first snowboarder to successfully defend a World Championship title in that discipline.

At the 2014 Winter Olympics in Sochi, he won the bronze medal in the parallel slalom.

At the 2015 World Championships in Kreischberg, Karl took bronze in the parallel giant slalom. At the 2017 World Championships in Sierra Nevada, he won silver in both the parallel slalom and parallel giant slalom, finishing behind his roommate and compatriot Andreas Prommegger in both finals.

At the 2018 Winter Olympics in Pyeongchang, Karl finished fifth in the parallel giant slalom as the best-placed Austrian rider.

=== 2021–2026: Olympic gold and final season ===
At the 2021 World Championships in Rogla, Slovenia, Karl won his fifth World Championship gold medal in the parallel slalom at the age of 35.

At the 2022 Winter Olympics in Beijing, Karl won the gold medal in the parallel giant slalom, becoming Olympic champion at the age of 36.

At the 2026 Winter Olympics, Karl defended his Olympic title, winning gold in the parallel giant slalom at the Livigno Snow Park in Italy on 8 February 2026. It was his fifth Olympic Games appearance, having previously competed in 2010, 2014, 2018, and 2022. The win made him the oldest individual gold medalist in Winter Olympics history at 40 years and 115 days. Just eight days later, this record was surpassed by 41-years old American bobsledder Elana Meyers Taylor who won gold medal in the women's monobob event.

In November 2025, Karl announced that the 2025–26 season would be his last, stating: "This will definitely be my last season." He expressed his intention to end his career at the Milano Cortina 2026 Winter Olympics after more than two decades at the top of the sport.

== Personal life ==
Karl married Nina Grissmann, daughter of former Austrian alpine skier Werner Grissmann, in August 2011. The couple have two daughters and live in Lienz, East Tyrol.

An avid mountain biker, Karl regularly competes in cycling events as part of his off-season training. He participated in the ultra-endurance Race Around Austria three times (2011, 2012, 2014), and in 2014 finished fourth in the relay alongside Axel Naglich, Andreas Goldberger, and Christoph Sumann. In the summer of 2025, he completed a 1,581-kilometre ultra-cycling race.

== Traffic accident conviction ==
On 30 June 2021, Karl was involved in a fatal road accident on the Felbertauern road near Mittersill, Salzburg. Driving his sponsor car at an estimated 100–110 km/h in an 80 km/h zone during rainy conditions, he lost control after the road became unexpectedly covered in hail following an avalanche gallery. His car skidded into oncoming traffic and struck the vehicle of an elderly couple. The 70-year-old male driver was killed and his 69-year-old wife was seriously injured.

On 29 April 2022, Karl was convicted of negligent homicide (German: fahrlässige Tötung) at the Zell am See District Court. A court expert testified that the accident would have been avoidable had Karl obeyed the speed limit, and that following the principle of driving on sight would have required a speed of only 65 km/h. Karl expressed remorse, saying "I am incredibly sorry", and accepted full responsibility. He was sentenced to three months' imprisonment, suspended on probation. The verdict was not yet legally binding at the time of sentencing, as the prosecutor reserved the right to appeal for a harsher penalty.
