= Dario Caviezel =

Swiss snowboarder (born 1995)

Personal information
- Born: 12 July 1995 (age 30) Domleschg, Switzerland

Sport
- Country: Switzerland
- Sport: Snowboarding
Medal record
Men's snowboarding
Representing Switzerland
World Championships
Silver medal – second place	2023 Bakuriani	Parallel giant slalom
Bronze medal – third place	2023 Bakuriani	Mixed parallel slalom

Dario Caviezel (born 12 July 1995) is a Swiss snowboarder.

He competed in the 2017 FIS Snowboard World Championships, and in the 2018 Winter Olympics, in parallel giant slalom.
