= Stefan Baumeister =

German snowboarder (born 1993)

Personal information
- Nationality: German
- Born: 18 April 1993 (age 33) Bad Aibling, Germany
- Height: 1.73 m (5 ft 8 in)
- Weight: 72 kg (159 lb)

Sport
- Country: Germany
- Sport: Snowboarding
- Event: Parallel giant slalom
- Club: SC Aising Pang
Medal record
Men's snowboarding
Representing Germany
World Championships
Silver medal – second place	2025 Engadin	Parallel giant slalom
Bronze medal – third place	2019 Utah	Parallel giant slalom
Bronze medal – third place	2019 Utah	Parallel slalom

Stefan Baumeister (born 18 April 1993) is a German snowboarder, specializing in Alpine snowboarding.

== Career ==
Baumeister competed at the 2014 Winter Olympics for Germany. He placed 20th in qualifying for the parallel giant slalom, not advancing. In the parallel slalom, he finished 14th in qualifying. In the first elimination round, he was beaten by Austria's Lukas Mathies, finishing 14th overall.

As of September 2014, his best showing at the World Championships is 23rd, in the 2013 parallel slalom.

Baumeister made his World Cup debut in February 2010. As of September 2014, his best finish is 8th, in a parallel slalom at Bad Gastein in 2013–14. His best overall finish is 25th, in 2013–14.
