= Arnaud Gaudet =

Canadian snowboarder (born 2000)

Personal information
- Born: August 10, 2000 (age 25) Sainte-Agathe-des-Monts, Quebec, Canada

Sport
- Country: Canada
- Sport: Snowboarding
- Event(s): Parallel giant slalom, Parallel slalom
Medal record
Men's snowboarding
Representing Canada
World Championships
Bronze medal – third place	2023 Bakuriani	Parallel slalom
Junior World Championships
Bronze medal – third place	2020 Lachtal	Parallel Giant Slalom

Arnaud Gaudet (French pronunciation: [aʁno ɡodɛ]; born August 10, 2000) is a Canadian snowboarder who competes internationally in the alpine snowboard discipline.

== Career ==
At the 2020 FIS Snowboarding Junior World Championships, Gaudet won bronze in the parallel giant slalom event.

Gaudet has competed at two Senior World Championships in 2019 and 2021, with his best performance (17th place) coming in 2019 in the parallel slalom event.

During the 2021-22 World Cup Season, Gaudet had a seventh-place finish in January 2022 in the parallel slalom event. Later that month, Gaudet was named to Canada's 2022 Olympic team in the parallel giant slalom event. Gaudet was the youngest ever snowboarder named to Canada's Alpine Olympic snowboard team.
