= Lee Sang-ho (snowboarder) =

South Korean snowboarder (born 1995)

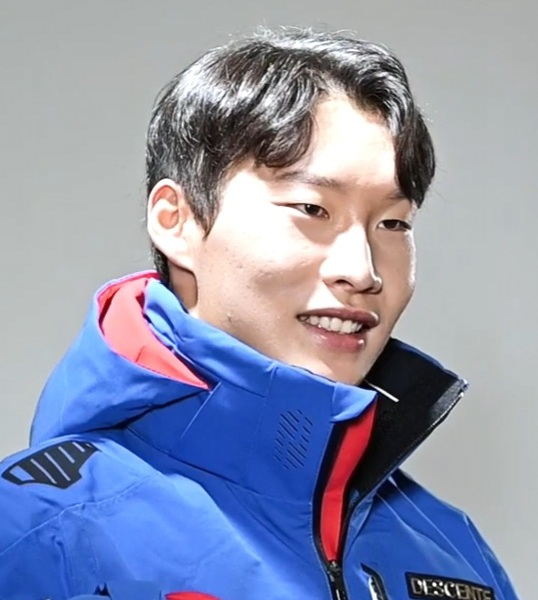

Personal information
- Born: 12 September 1995 (age 30) Jeongseon, South Korea
- Height: 180 cm (5 ft 11 in)

Sport
- Sport: Skiing

World Cup career
- Indiv. podiums: 6
- Indiv. wins: 1
Medal record
Men's snowboarding
Representing South Korea
Asian Winter Games
Gold medal – first place	2017 Sapporo	Giant slalom
Gold medal – first place	2017 Sapporo	Slalom
Olympic Games
Silver medal – second place	2018 Pyeongchang	Parallel giant slalom
Winter Universiade
Bronze medal – third place	2019 Krasnoyarsk	Parallel slalom
World Championships
Bronze medal – third place	2025 Engadin	Parallel giant slalom

Lee Sang-ho (Korean: 이상호; born 12 September 1995) is a South Korean snowboarder who competes internationally.

He competed in the 2018 Winter Olympics, where he won a silver medal in parallel giant slalom.

Lee also competed at the 2022 Winter Olympics.
