= Andreas Prommegger =

Austrian snowboarder (born 1980)

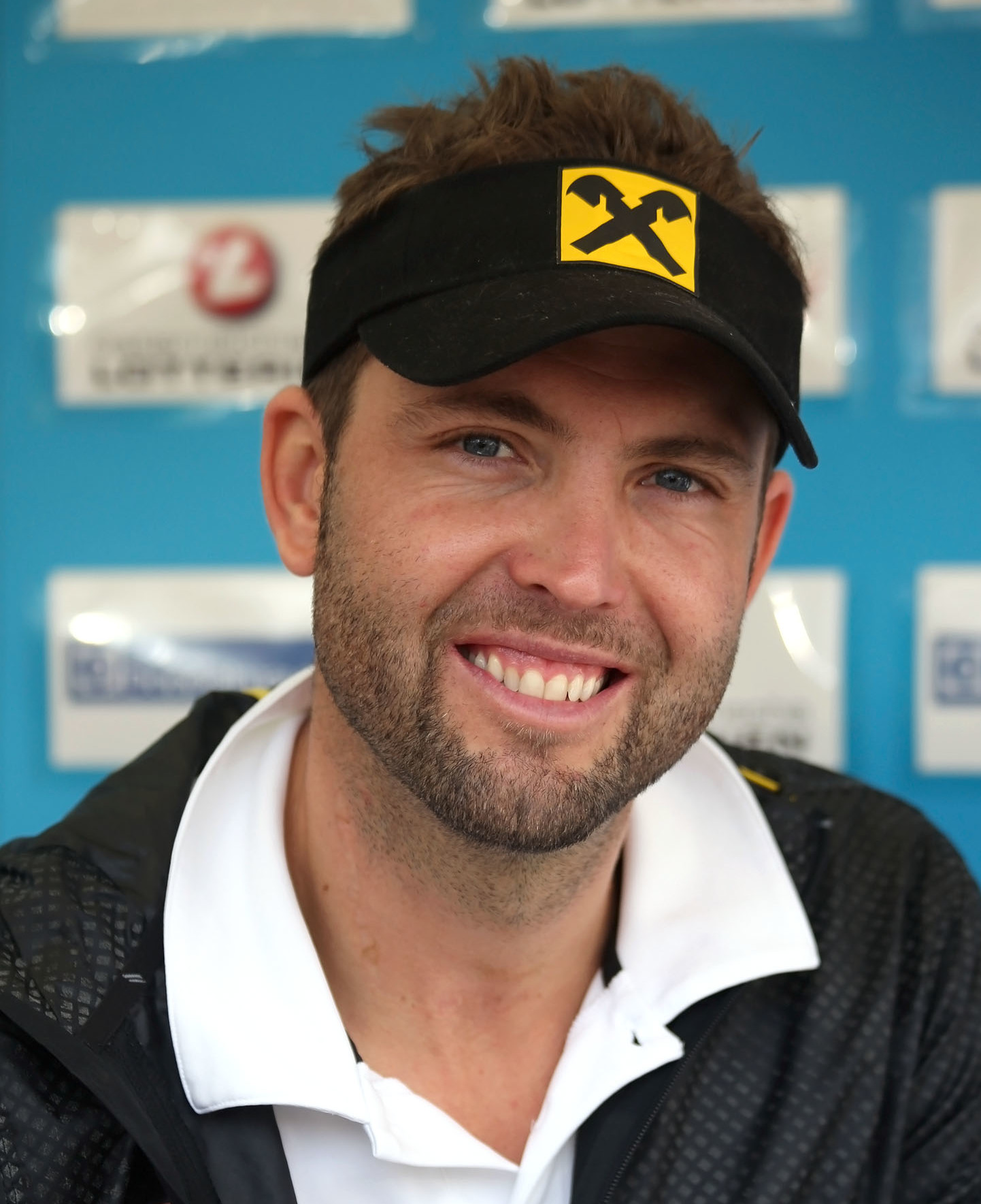
- Prommegger in 2013

Personal information
- Nationality: Austrian
- Born: 10 November 1980 (age 45) Schwarzach im Pongau, Austria
- Height: 1.80 m (5 ft 11 in)
- Weight: 80 kg (176 lb)

Sport
- Country: Austria
- Sport: Snowboard
- Event: Parallel slalom
- Club: WSV St. Johann
Medal record
Men's snowboarding
Representing Austria
World Championships
Gold medal – first place	2017 Sierra Nevada	Parallel slalom
Gold medal – first place	2017 Sierra Nevada	Parallel giant slalom
Gold medal – first place	2023 Bakuriani	Parallel slalom
Silver medal – second place	2021 Rogla	Parallel slalom
Silver medal – second place	2023 Bakuriani	Mixed parallel slalom
Bronze medal – third place	2025 Engadin	Mixed parallel slalom

Andreas Prommegger (born 10 November 1980) is an Austrian professional snowboarder.

== Career ==
Prommegger's specialty is the Parallel competitions in Slalom, in which he is the 2017 and 2023 world champion, and Giant Slalom, in which he won the gold medal at the 2017 World Championships. He also won the silver medal in Parallel Slalom at the 2021 World Championships, losing the final to long-time friend and rival Benjamin Karl.

By winning the 2023 Parallel Slalom title in Bakuriani at 42, he became the oldest world champion ever not only in snowboarding but in all FIS sanctioned events, except grass skiing.

Prommegger has competed at the 2006, 2010, 2014, 2018,, 2022 Winter Olympics.

== Career highlights ==
Olympic Winter Games
2006 – Turin, 9th at parallel giant slalom
FIS World Snowboard Championships
1999 – Seiser Alm, (silver) 2nd at parallel giant slalom (juniors)
1999 – Berchtesgaden, 43rd at snowboardcross
2000 – Berchtesgaden, (gold) 1st at parallel giant slalom (juniors)
2000 – Berchtesgaden, (gold) 1st at parallel slalom (juniors)
2001 – Madonna di Campiglio, 22nd at snowboardcross
2001 – Madonna di Campiglio, 10th at parallel giant slalom
2001 – Madonna di Campiglio, 23rd at parallel slalom
2005 – Whistler, 5th at parallel giant slalom
2005 – Whistler, 9th at parallel slalom
2007 – Arosa, 4th at parallel slalom
2007 – Arosa, 5th at parallel giant slalom
World Cup
2004 – Berchtesgaden, (bronze) 3rd at parallel giant slalom
2004 – Winterberg, (bronze) 3rd at parallel slalom
2005 – Le Relais, (silver) 2nd at parallel giant slalom
2006 – Lake Placid, (bronze) 3rd at parallel giant slalom
2006 – Furano, (silver) 2nd at parallel giant slalom
2007 – Sungwoo, (silver) 2nd at parallel giant slalom
2008 – La Molina, (gold) 1st at parallel giant slalom
2008 – La Molina, (bronze) 3rd at parallel slalom
National Championships
2000 – Innichen, (gold) 1st at snowboardcross
2001 – Sappada, (bronze) 3rd at parallel giant slalom
2004 – Bad Gastein, (gold) 1st at parallel slalom
2005 – Kreischberg, (gold) 1st at parallel giant slalom
2007 – Haus im Ennstal, (gold) 1st at giant slalom
