= Alexander Payer =

Austrian snowboarder (born 1989)

Alex Payer
Personal information
- Full name: Alexander Payer
- Born: 12 September 1989 (age 36) Sankt Veit an der Glan, Austria
- Height: 1.74 m (5 ft 9 in)
- Weight: 74 kg (163 lb)

Sport
- Country: Austria
- Sport: Snowboarding
Medal record
Men's snowboarding
Representing Austria
World Championships
Bronze medal – third place	2023 Bakuriani	Parallel giant slalom
Winter World University Games
Bronze medal – third place	2015 Granada	Parallel giant slalom

Alexander Payer (born 12 September 1989) is an Austrian snowboarder.

He competed in the 2017 FIS Snowboard World Championships, and in the 2018 Winter Olympics, in parallel giant slalom.
