= Tim Mastnak =

Slovenian snowboarder (born 1991)

Personal information
- Nationality: Slovenian
- Born: 31 January 1991 (age 35) Celje, SR Slovenia, SFR Yugoslavia
- Height: 1.77 m (5 ft 10 in)

Sport
- Country: Slovenia
- Sport: Snowboarding
- Event: Parallel giant slalom
- Club: Sport Klub M-Celje
- Coached by: Robert Mastnak
Medal record
Olympic Games
Silver medal – second place	2022 Beijing	Parallel giant slalom
World Championships
Silver medal – second place	2019 Utah	Parallel GS

Tim Mastnak (born 31 January 1991) is a Slovenian snowboarder. At the 2022 Winter Olympics, he won a silver medal in the parallel giant slalom.

== World cup results ==
=== Wins ===
Season	Date	Venue	Discipline
2017–18	10 March 2018	Scuol, Switzerland	Parallel giant slalom
2018–19	13 December 2018	Carezza, Italy	Parallel giant slalom
2018–19	23 February 2019	Secret Garden, China	Parallel giant slalom
2024–25	7 December 2024	Yanqing, China	Parallel giant slalom

== Winter Olympic Games results ==
- 1 medal – (1 silver)

Year	Parallel giant slalom
(South Korea) 2018 Pyeongchang	16
(China) 2022 Beijing	2
(Italy) 2026 Milano Cortina	4
