= Snowboarding at the Winter World University Games =

- Events: 10 (men: 5; women: 5)

Games
- 1959; 1960; 1961; 1962; 1963; 1964; 1965; 1966; 1967; 1968; 1970; 1970; 1973; 1972; 1975; 1975; 1977; 1978; 1979; 1981; 1983; 1985; 1987; 1989; 1991; 1993; 1995; 1997; 1999; 2001; 2003; 2005; 2007; 2009; 2011; 2013; 2015; 2017; 2019; 2023; 2025

Snowboarding events have been contested at the Universiade since 1995 as an optional sport. Since 1999, they have been a mandatory sport.

== Events ==
Event	95	97	99	01	03	05	07	09	11	13	15	17	19	Years
Men's giant slalom	•		•	•	•		•		•					6
Men's parallel giant slalom	•					•		•		•	•	•	•	7
Men's parallel slalom				•								•	•	3
Men's big air						•		•				•		3
Men's halfpipe			•	•	•	•	•	•	•	•	•		•	10
Men's slopestyle									•	•	•	•	•	5
Men's snowcross			•	•	•	•	•	•	•	•	•	•	•	11
Women's giant slalom	•		•	•	•		•		•					6
Women's parallel giant slalom	•					•		•		•	•	•	•	7
Women's parallel slalom				•								•	•	3
Women's big air												•		1
Women's halfpipe			•	•	•	•	•	•	•	•	•		•	10
Women's slopestyle									•	•	•	•	•	5
Women's snowcross			•	•	•	•	•	•	•	•	•	•	•	11

== Medalists ==
=== Men ===
==== Giant slalom ====
Year	Gold	Silver	Bronze
1995	(United States) Jeffrey Greenwood	(Italy) Alex Andreis	(United States) Ryan Mullen
1997	not included in the program		
1999	(Italy) Federico Parini	(Canada) Mitch Baker	(Bulgaria) Boian Grebencharski
2001	(Austria) Michael Dabringer	(Slovenia) Klemen Razinger	(Switzerland) Christian Hanselmann
2003	(Austria) Michael Dabringer	(Russia) Dimitri Vaitkous	(Austria) Manuel Geiler
2005	not included in the program		
2007	(Slovenia) Rok Marguč	(Slovenia) Žan Košir	(France) Sylvain Dufour
2009	not included in the program		
2011	(South Korea) Kim Sang-Kyum	(Austria) Sebastian Kislinger	(Switzerland) Nevin Galmarini
2013-2023	not included in the program		

==== Parallel giant slalom ====
Year	Gold	Silver	Bronze
1995	(United States) Jeffrey Greenwood	(Italy) Thomas Mossner	(United States) Ryan Mullen
1997-2003	not included in the program		
2005	(Austria) Thomas Lienbacher	(Slovenia) Žan Košir	(Bulgaria) Bojan Grebencharski
2007	not included in the program		
2009	(Russia) Viktor Kulikov	(Austria) Andreas Lausegger	(Germany) Alex Deubl
2011	not included in the program		
2013	(Austria) Sebastian Kislinger	(Italy) Aaron March	(Slovenia) Tim Mastnak
2015	(Germany) Daniel Weis	(South Korea) Choi Bo-gun	(Austria) Alexander Payer
2017	(Russia) Bogdan Bogdanov	(Russia) Vladislav Shkurikhin	(Ukraine) Oleksandr Belinskyy
2019	(Poland) Oskar Kwiatkowski	(Poland) Michał Nowaczyk	(Russia) Dmitry Sarsembaev
2023	(Ukraine) Mykhailo Kharuk	(Austria) Matthäus Pink	(South Korea) Hong Seung-yeong
2025	(Bulgaria) Tervel Zamfirov	(South Korea) Jun Ho Ma	(Italy) Fabian Lantschner

==== Parallel slalom ====
Year	Gold	Silver	Bronze
1995-1999	not included in the program		
2001	(Switzerland) Christian Hanselmann	(Hungary) Andras Zarandy	(Switzerland) Remo Diethelm
2003–2015	not included in the program		
2017	(Russia) Bogdan Bogdanov	(Poland) Oskar Kwiatkowski	(Ukraine) Oleksandr Belinskyy
2019	(Russia) Dmitry Sarsembaev	(Russia) Dmitry Karlagachev	(South Korea) Lee Sang-ho
2023	(Austria) Matthäus Pink	(Austria) Dominik Burgstaller	(Ukraine) Mykhailo Kharuk
2025	(Austria) Matthäus Pink	(Italy) Simon Dorfmann	(Bulgaria) Alexander Krashinak

==== Big air ====
Year	Gold	Silver	Bronze
1995-2003	not included in the program		
2005	(Austria) Dominik Hoerner	(Slovenia) Matevz Pristavec	(France) Raphael Delfour
2007	not included in the program		
2009	(Japan) Kazuhiro Kokubo	(Finland) Pekka Ruokanen	(Russia) Dmitri Mindrul
2011–2015	not included in the program		
2017	(Russia) Mikhail Matveev	(Australia) Joss Mcalpin	(Czech Republic) Martin Mikyska
2019	not included in the program		
2023	(Japan) Kaku Yusei	(Germany) Wolfgang Breu	(Japan) Suzuki Atsuhiro
2025	(Japan) Ryoji Fujiya	(France) Noé Petit	(Germany) Wolfgang Breu

==== Halfpipe ====
Year	Gold	Silver	Bronze
1995-1997	not included in the program		
1999	(Austria) Martin Krebernik	(Switzerland) Simon Raess	(Germany) Thomas Rauch
2001	(Japan) Hayato Doi	(Poland) Wojciech Pająk	(Slovenia) Matus Hubka
2003	(Japan) Daisuke Murakami	(Poland) Wojciech Pająk	(Japan) Hayato Doi
2005	(Canada) Brendan Davis	(Austria) Philipp Holleis	(Poland) Michał Ligocki
2007	(Poland) Michał Ligocki	(Canada) Brendan Davis	(Finland) Juha Kinnunen
2009	(Japan) Kazuhiro Kokubo	(South Korea) Kim Ho-jun	(China) Zeng Xiaoye
2011	(Japan) Ryo Aono	(Japan) Kazuumi Fujita	(South Korea) Kim Ho-jun
2013	(Spain) Ruben Verges	(China) Hu Yi	(Switzerland) Rafael Imhof
2015	(Japan) Ayumu Nedefuji	(United States) Zachary Black	(United States) Broc Waring
2017	not included in the program		
2019	(Russia) Nikita Avtaneev	(South Korea) Kweon Lee-jun	(Finland) Axel Thelen
2019-2025	not included in the program		

==== Slopestyle ====
Year	Gold	Silver	Bronze
1995-2009	not included in the program		
2011	event cancelled		
2013	(Switzerland) Philippe Haenni	(United States) Billy Wandling	(Switzerland) Rafael Imhof
2015	(Czech Republic) Petr Horák	(Poland) Piotr Janosz	(Czech Republic) Martin Mikyska
2017	(Russia) Mikhail Matveev	(Finland) Aleksi Partanen	(Czech Republic) Martin Mikyska
2019	(Russia) Anton Mamaev	(Russia) Vlad Khadarin	(Finland) Axel Thelen
2023	(South Korea) Lee Min-sik	(Japan) Haruhi Tsuji	(Japan) Suzuki Atsuhiro
2025	(France) Noé Petit	(Netherlands) Thom Marinus Vogel	(France) Liam Garandel

==== Snowcross ====
Year	Gold	Silver	Bronze
1995-1997	not included in the program		
1999	(Austria) Michi Toelderer	(Switzerland) Christian Hanselmann	(Russia) Denis Zezin
2001	(Austria) Thomas Tengg	(Austria) Manuel Geiler	(Switzerland) Juerg Ackerman
2003	(Czech Republic) Michal Novotný	(France) Boris Melquiot	(Switzerland) Xavier Perret
2005	(Austria) Hans-Joerg Unterrainer	(Switzerland) Sascha Duff	(France) Paul-Henri Delerue
2007	(France) Léo Trespeuch	(Russia) Andrey Boldykov	(Italy) Lorenzo Semino
2009	(Austria) Andreas Lausegger	(Poland) Marcin Bocian	(Switzerland) Clemens Bolli
2011	(Germany) Konstantin Schad	(Italy) Omar Visintin	(Italy) Federico Raimo
2013	(Austria) Hanno Douschan	(Russia) Nikolay Olyunin	(France) Leo Trespeuch
2015	(Russia) Nikolay Olyunin	(Austria) Alessandro Hämmerle	(France) Nathan Birrien
2017	(France) Léo Le Blé Jaques	(France) Guilhem Apilli	(Switzerland) Sandro Perrenoud
2019	(Canada) Will Malisch	(Russia) Daniil Dilman	(Japan) Yoshiki Takahara
2023	(France) Benjamin Gattaz	(Czech Republic) Jakub Žerava	(Germany) Leon Beckhaus
2025	(France) Quentin Sodegas	(Spain) Bernat Violan	(Germany) Umito Kirchwehm

=== Women ===
==== Giant slalom ====
Year	Gold	Silver	Bronze
1995	(Switzerland) Chiristine Gutter	(Slovenia) Katja Gornik	(United States) Madeleine Hengee
1997	not included in the program		
1999	(Poland) Małgorzata Kukucz	(Germany) Christine Gutter	(Austria) Melina Holzer
2001	(Slovenia) Damiana Kacafura	(Russia) Svietlana Boldikova	(Bulgaria) Maria Dimova
2003	(France) Julie Pomagalski	(Finland) Anna Heiramo	(Poland) Blanca Isielonis
2005	not included in the program		
2007	(Italy) Corinna Boccacini	(Russia) Svietlana Boldikova	(Switzerland) Daniela Meuli
2009	not included in the program		
2011	(Germany) Selina Jörg	(Ukraine) Annamari Chundak	(Slovenia) Gloria Kotnik
2013-2025	not included in the program		

==== Parallel giant slalom ====
Year	Gold	Silver	Bronze
1995	(Switzerland) Chiristine Gutter	(Slovenia) Katja Gornik	(United States) Kyre Byram
1997-2003	not included in the program		
2005	(France) Florine Valdenaire	(Austria) Romy Pletzer	(Italy) Corinna Boccacini
2007	not included in the program		
2009	(Austria) Anja Puggl	(Japan) Shohko Miyatake	(Poland) Karolina Sztokfisz
2011	not included in the program		
2013	(Austria) Julia Dujmovits	(Austria) Sabine Schoeffmann	(Germany) Selina Jörg
2015	(Switzerland) Patrizia Kummer	(Germany) Selina Jörg	(Italy) Nadya Ochner
2017	(Poland) Aleksandra Król	(Ukraine) Annamari Dancha	(Poland) Karolina Sztokfisz
2019	(South Korea) Jeong Hae-rim	(Russia) Milena Bykova	(Russia) Natalia Soboleva
2023	(Italy) Elisa Fava	(Austria) Carmen Kainz	(Switzerland) Flurina Baetschi
2025	(Austria) Carmen Kainz	(Italy) Elisa Fava	(Japan) Noa Kanazawa

==== Parallel slalom ====
Year	Gold	Silver	Bronze
1995-1999	not included in the program		
2001	(Poland) Blanka Isielonis	(Russia) Svietlana Boldikova	(Slovenia) Damiana Kacafura
2003–2015	not included in the program		
2017	(Poland) Weronika Biela	(United States) Maggie Carrigan	(Poland) Karolina Sztokfisz
2019	(Russia) Milena Bykova	(Russia) Natalia Soboleva	(South Korea) Jeong Hae-rim
2023	(Austria) Carmen Kainz	(Switzerland) Flurina Baetschi	(Ukraine) Nadiia Hapatyn
2025	(Italy) Elisa Fava	(Austria) Carmen Kainz	(Austria) Martina Ankele

==== Big air ====
Year	Gold	Silver	Bronze
1995–2015	not included in the program		
2017	(Russia) Anastasia Loginova	(Russia) Elena Kostenko	(Poland) Katarzyna Rusin
2019	not included in the program		
2023	(Switzerland) Livia Tanno	(Japan) Yoshizawa Hikari	(France) Noémie Equy
2025	(Slovenia) Tinkara Valcl	(United Kingdom) Holly Smith	(Canada) Amy McCarthy

==== Halfpipe ====
Year	Gold	Silver	Bronze
1995-1997	not included in the program		
1999	(Austria) Maria Schumacher	(Spain) Arantxa Gandiaga	(Germany) Vanessa Tinney
2001	(Switzerland) Aude Combelles	(Switzerland) Andrea Schuler	(Germany) Vanessa Tinney
2003	(Germany) Annette Steinbauer	(Italy) Alessia Follador	(Germany) Vanessa Tinney
2005	(Poland) Paulina Ligocka	(China) Pan Lei	(Finland) Saana Pehkonen
2007	(Poland) Paulina Ligocka	(China) Pan Lei	(China) Lu Xiaoxiao
2009	(China) Liu Jiayu	(China) Sun Zhifeng	(China) Chen Xu
2011	(China) Cai Xuetong	(France) Sophie Rodriguez	(China) Li Shuang
2013	(China) Li Shuang	(China) Sun Zhifeng	(China) Xu Xiujuan
2015	(China) Cai Xuetong	(Spain) Queralt Castellet	(Switzerland) Carla Somaini
2017	not included in the program		
2019	(Japan) Kurumi Imai	(China) Qiu Leng	(China) Wu Shaotong
2023-2025	not included in the program		

==== Slopestyle ====
Year	Gold	Silver	Bronze
1995-2009	not included in the program		
2011	event cancelled		
2013	(New Zealand) Natalie Good	(Switzerland) Carla Somaini	(Switzerland) Caroline Hoeckel
2015	(Switzerland) Celia Petrig	(United States) Courtney Cox	(France) Marion Haerty
2017	(Poland) Katarzyna Rusin	(Australia) Amber Arazny	(Russia) Anastasia Loginova
2019	(Russia) Elena Kostenko	(Russia) Anastasia Loginova	(Russia) Ekaterina Kosova
2023	(Switzerland) Livia Tanno	(France) Noémie Equy	(Slovenia) Tinkara Valcl
2025	(Slovenia) Tinkara Valcl	(Canada) Amy McCarthy	(Argentina) Abril Casco

==== Snowcross ====
Year	Gold	Silver	Bronze
1995-1997	not included in the program		
1999	(Germany) Melina Holzer	(Austria) Bettina Koeffler	(Poland) Małgorzata Kukucz
2001	(Switzerland) Simone Bachmann	(Switzerland) Claudia Heusermann	(Poland) Klaudyna Mikołajczyk
2003	(France) Julie Pomagalski	(Switzerland) Kathrin Kellenberger	(Russia) Olga Golovanova
2005	(France) Morgane Fleury	(Germany) Alexandra Sock	(Switzerland) Corinne Mottu
2007	(France) Diane Thermoz Liaudy	(France) Delphine Carponcin	(Italy) Raffaella Brutto
2009	(France) Claire Chapotot	(Czech Republic) Klára Koukalová	(Italy) Raffaella Brutto
2011	(Czech Republic) Klára Koukalová	(France) Claire Chapotot	(Czech Republic) Martina Krejčová
2013	(Czech Republic) Eva Samková	(Czech Republic) Kateřina Chourová	(Poland) Zuzanna Smykała
2015	(Bulgaria) Aleksandra Zhekova	(France) Chloé Trespeuch	(Switzerland) Simona Meiler
2017	(France) Sarah Devassoux	(Switzerland) Miriam Wuffli	(Czech Republic) Kateřina Chourová
2019	(Russia) Kristina Paul	(Russia) Aleksandra Parshina	(Canada) Audrey McManiman
2023	(Switzerland) Sophie Hediger	(France) Chloé Passerat	(France) Kim Martinez
2025	(France) Camille Poulat	(France) Margaux Herpin	(Italy) Marika Savoldelli

== Medal table ==
Last updated after the 2025 Winter World University Games

Rank	Nation	Gold	Silver	Bronze	Total
1	Austria (AUT)	20	15	4	39
2	France (FRA)	14	11	12	37
3	Switzerland (SUI)	14	10	16	40
4	Russia (RUS)	13	15	7	35
5	Japan (JPN)	10	6	7	23
6	Poland (POL)	9	6	9	24
7	Italy (ITA)	5	7	8	20
8	Germany (GER)	5	6	7	18
9	China (CHN)	4	6	6	16
9	Slovenia (SLO)	4	6	6	16
11	South Korea (KOR)	4	4	6	14
12	Czech Republic (CZE)	4	4	5	13
13	United States (USA)	2	4	6	12
14	Canada (CAN)	2	3	2	7
15	Ukraine (UKR)	2	2	6	10
16	Bulgaria (BUL)	2	0	4	6
17	Spain (ESP)	1	3	0	4
18	New Zealand (NZL)	1	0	0	1
19	Finland (FIN)	0	3	4	7
20	Australia (AUS)	0	2	0	2
21	Great Britain (GBR)	0	1	0	1
21	Hungary (HUN)	0	1	0	1
21	Netherlands (NED)	0	1	0	1
24	Argentina (ARG)	0	0	1	1
Totals (24 entries)		116	116	116	348
