= FIS Freestyle Ski and Snowboarding World Championships 2019 – Men's parallel slalom =

Men's parallel slalom at the FIS Freestyle Ski and Snowboarding World Championships 2019
- Venue: Park City Mountain Resort
- Location: Utah, United States
- Dates: February 5
- Competitors: 53 from 21 nations

Medalists
gold medal	Dmitry Loginov	Russia
silver medal	Roland Fischnaller	Italy
bronze medal	Stefan Baumeister	Germany

The Men's parallel slalom competition at the FIS Freestyle Ski and Snowboarding World Championships 2019 was held on February 5, 2019.

== Qualification ==
The qualification was started at 09:00. After the first run, the top 32 snowboarders were allowed a second run on the opposite course.

Rank	Bib	Name	Country	Blue course	Red course	Total	Notes
1	10	Roland Fischnaller	Italy	38.04	40.64	1:18.68	Q
2	9	Dario Caviezel	Switzerland	40.55	38.68	1:19.23	Q
3	13	Dmitry Loginov	Russia	40.39	39.37	1:19.76	Q
4	3	Stefan Baumeister	Germany	41.11	39.10	1:20.21	Q
5	17	Aaron March	Italy	39.98	40.26	1:20.24	Q
6	14	Andreas Prommegger	Austria	39.90	40.96	1:20.86	Q
7	21	Dmitry Sarsembaev	Russia	40.05	40.82	1:20.87	Q
8	4	Žan Košir	Slovenia	38.50	42.51	1:21.01	Q
9	6	Radoslav Yankov	Bulgaria	39.52	41.70	1:21.22	Q
10	1	Benjamin Karl	Austria	41.23	40.28	1:21.51	Q
11	20	Daniele Bagozza	Italy	41.71	40.39	1:22.10	Q
12	42	Christian Hupfauer	Germany	40.38	41.90	1:22.28	Q
13	31	Shinnosuke Kamino	Japan	41.40	41.25	1:22.65	Q
14	35	Robert Burns	United States	41.89	41.01	1:22.90	Q
15	22	Arvid Auner	Austria	41.82	41.45	1:23.27	Q
16	23	Lukas Mathies	Austria	41.48	41.99	1:23.47	Q
17	27	Darren Gardner	Canada	41.66	42.16	1:23.82	
18	26	Bi Ye	China	43.74	40.41	1:24.15	
19	38	Christian de Oliveira	Portugal	42.39	41.98	1:24.37	
20	8	Sylvain Dufour	France	41.69	43.49	1:25.18	
21	28	Michał Nowaczyk	Poland	41.75	43.59	1:25.34	
22	34	Cody Winters	United States	43.17	42.38	1:25.55	
23	7	Jasey-Jay Anderson	Canada	45.19	40.53	1:25.72	
24	30	Choi Bo-gun	South Korea	42.24	43.95	1:26.19	
25	37	Elias Huber	Germany	42.21	44.08	1:26.29	
26	36	Zhang Xuan	China	42.36	44.15	1:26.51	
27	46	Oleksandr Belinskyy	Ukraine	43.16	43.61	1:26.77	
28	11	Tim Mastnak	Slovenia	47.62	39.45	1:27.07	
29	29	Kim Sang-kyum	South Korea	45.69	42.65	1:28.34	
30	12	Sebastian Kislinger	Austria	39.47	DNF		
31	33	Ryan Rosencranz	United States	DNF	42.49		
32	43	Qin Zihan	China	DSQ	41.25		
33	40	Viktor Brůžek	Czech Republic	43.89			
34	48	Roman Aleksandrovskyy	Ukraine	44.46			
35	24	Masaki Shiba	Japan	44.57			
36	39	Matej Bačo	Slovakia		45.05		
37	32	Arnaud Gaudet	Canada	45.53			
38	45	Revaz Nazgaidze	Georgia		45.97		
39	41	Shin Seok-jin	South Korea		46.69		
40	51	Rollan Sadykov	Kazakhstan		47.26		
41	52	Vladislav Zuyev	Kazakhstan	48.23			
42	44	Sun Huan	China	54.81			
43	53	Ioannis Doumos	Greece		58.90		
—	25	Sébastien Beaulieu	Canada		DNF		
—	19	Oskar Kwiatkowski	Poland		DNF		
—	2	Maurizio Bormolini	Italy	DNF			
—	50	Adam Počinek	Czech Republic	DSQ			
—	49	Leoš Prokopec	Czech Republic		DSQ		
—	47	Yevheniy Huliy	Ukraine		DSQ		
—	18	Vic Wild	Russia	DSQ			
—	16	Nevin Galmarini	Switzerland	DSQ			
—	15	Andrey Sobolev	Russia		DSQ		
—	5	Lee Sang-ho	South Korea		DSQ		

== Elimination round ==
The 16 best racers advanced to the elimination round.

1/8 finals
4	(Germany) Baumeister
13	(Japan) Kamino	+2.04
5	(Italy) March
12	(Germany) Hupfauer	+1.32
8	(Slovenia) Košir	DSQ
9	(Bulgaria) Yankov
1	(Italy) Fischnaller
16	(Austria) Mathies	+0.48
2	(Switzerland) Caviezel	DSQ
15	(Austria) Auner
7	(Russia) Sarsembaev
10	(Austria) Karl	+1.69
6	(Austria) Prommegger
11	(Italy) Bagozza	+0.50
3	(Russia) Loginov
14	(United States) Burns	+0.62

Quarterfinals
4	(Germany) Baumeister
5	(Italy) March	+1.04
9	(Bulgaria) Yankov	+0.33
1	(Italy) Fischnaller
15	(Austria) Auner	+0.54
7	(Russia) Sarsembaev
6	(Austria) Prommegger	+1.86
3	(Russia) Loginov

Semifinals
4	(Germany) Baumeister	+0.18
1	(Italy) Fischnaller
7	(Russia) Sarsembaev	+1.85
3	(Russia) Loginov

Finals
1	(Italy) Fischnaller	DSQ
3	(Russia) Loginov
Third place
4	(Germany) Baumeister
7	(Russia) Sarsembaev	DNF
