= FIS Freestyle Ski and Snowboarding World Championships 2019 – Men's parallel giant slalom =

Men's parallel giant slalom at the FIS Freestyle Ski and Snowboarding World Championships 2019
- Venue: Park City Mountain Resort
- Location: Utah, United States
- Dates: February 4
- Competitors: 56 from 21 nations

Medalists
| gold medal | Dmitry Loginov | Russia |
| silver medal | Tim Mastnak | Slovenia |
| bronze medal | Stefan Baumeister | Germany |

The men's parallel giant slalom competition at the FIS Freestyle Ski and Snowboarding World Championships 2019 was held on February 4, 2019.

== Qualification ==
The qualification was started at 09:00. After the first run, the top 32 snowboarders were allowed a second run on the opposite course.

| Rank | Bib | Name | Country | Blue course | Red course | Total | Notes |
|---|---|---|---|---|---|---|---|
| 1 | 16 | Dmitry Loginov | Russia | 37.60 | 37.91 | 1:15.51 | Q |
| 2 | 13 | Tim Mastnak | Slovenia | 37.98 | 38.18 | 1:16.16 | Q |
| 3 | 5 | Jasey-Jay Anderson | Canada | 38.49 | 38.27 | 1:16.76 | Q |
| 4 | 17 | Žan Košir | Slovenia | 38.52 | 38.46 | 1:16.98 | Q |
| 5 | 21 | Oskar Kwiatkowski | Poland | 38.55 | 38.44 | 1:16.99 | Q |
| 6 | 11 | Stefan Baumeister | Germany | 38.88 | 38.18 | 1:17.06 | Q |
| 7 | 24 | Lukas Mathies | Austria | 38.16 | 38.99 | 1:17.15 | Q |
| 8 | 1 | Edwin Coratti | Italy | 39.21 | 38.09 | 1:17.30 | Q |
| 9 | 7 | Alexander Payer | Austria | 38.28 | 39.06 | 1:17.34 | Q |
| 10 | 31 | Kim Sang-kyum | South Korea | 38.13 | 39.28 | 1:17.41 | Q |
| 11 | 6 | Andrey Sobolev | Russia | 39.11 | 38.44 | 1:17.55 | Q |
| 12 | 20 | Vic Wild | Russia | 38.36 | 39.34 | 1:17.70 | Q |
| 13 | 19 | Aaron March | Italy | 38.77 | 38.95 | 1:17.72 | Q |
| 14 | 8 | Dario Caviezel | Switzerland | 39.08 | 38.81 | 1:17.89 | Q |
| 15 | 39 | Elias Huber | Germany | 38.75 | 39.16 | 1:17.91 | Q |
| 16 | 9 | Andreas Prommegger | Austria | 38.45 | 39.55 | 1:18.00 | Q |
| 17 | 28 | Bi Ye | China | 38.49 | 39.52 | 1:18.01 | |
| 18 | 2 | Roland Fischnaller | Italy | 38.82 | 39.33 | 1:18.15 | |
| 19 | 22 | Daniele Bagozza | Italy | 39.48 | 38.79 | 1:18.27 | |
| 20 | 18 | Sylvain Dufour | France | 39.82 | 38.59 | 1:18.41 | |
| 21 | 23 | Dmitry Sarsembaev | Russia | 38.84 | 39.63 | 1:18.47 | |
| 21 | 44 | Christian Hupfauer | Germany | 38.99 | 39.48 | 1:18.47 | |
| 23 | 38 | Zhang Xuan | China | 38.73 | 39.78 | 1:18.51 | |
| 24 | 30 | Michał Nowaczyk | Poland | 39.35 | 39.28 | 1:18.63 | |
| 25 | 15 | Rok Marguč | Slovenia | 40.61 | 38.06 | 1:18.67 | |
| 26 | 14 | Radoslav Yankov | Bulgaria | 39.74 | 40.05 | 1:19.79 | |
| 27 | 27 | Sébastien Beaulieu | Canada | 40.22 | 39.60 | 1:19.82 | |
| 28 | 34 | Arnaud Gaudet | Canada | 39.73 | 40.81 | 1:20.54 | |
| 29 | 45 | Qin Zihan | China | 42.64 | 39.58 | 1:22.22 | |
| 30 | 10 | Sebastian Kislinger | Austria | 39.02 | 48.72 | 1:27.74 | |
| 31 | 12 | Lee Sang-ho | South Korea | 38.76 | DNF | | |
| 32 | 3 | Nevin Galmarini | Switzerland | DSQ | 39.11 | | |
| 33 | 50 | Albert Jelínek | Czech Republic | 39.87 | | | |
| 34 | 29 | Darren Gardner | Canada | | 39.90 | | |
| 35 | 40 | Christian de Oliveira | Portugal | 40.11 | | | |
| 36 | 25 | Aaron Muss | United States | | 40.41 | | |
| 37 | 46 | Sun Huan | China | 40.42 | | | |
| 38 | 37 | Robert Burns | United States | | 40.47 | | |
| 39 | 32 | Choi Bo-gun | South Korea | 40.55 | | | |
| 40 | 33 | Shinnosuke Kamino | Japan | | 40.58 | | |
| 41 | 36 | Cody Winters | United States | 41.08 | | | |
| 42 | 56 | Vladislav Zuyev | Kazakhstan | 41.30 | | | |
| 43 | 35 | Ryan Rosencranz | United States | | 41.43 | | |
| 44 | 53 | Adam Počinek | Czech Republic | | 41.84 | | |
| 45 | 48 | Oleksandr Belinskyy | Ukraine | 42.33 | | | |
| 46 | 51 | Roman Aleksandrovskyy | Ukraine | | 43.38 | | |
| 47 | 42 | Viktor Brůžek | Czech Republic | 43.97 | | | |
| 48 | 49 | Yevheniy Huliy | Portugal | | 48.26 | | |
| 49 | 54 | Ioannis Doumos | Greece | 54.86 | | | |
| 50 | 52 | Leoš Prokopec | Czech Republic | 58.67 | | | |
| — | 47 | Revaz Nazgaidze | Georgia | | DNF | | |
| — | 43 | Shin Seok-jin | South Korea | | DNF | | |
| — | 41 | Matej Bačo | Slovakia | | DNF | | |
| — | 55 | Rollan Sadykov | Kazakhstan | | DSQ | | |
| — | 26 | Masaki Shiba | Japan | DSQ | | | |
| — | 4 | Benjamin Karl | Austria | DSQ | | | |

== Elimination round ==
The 16 best racers advanced to the elimination round.

1/8 finals
4 | (Slovenia) Košir
13 | (Italy) March | +0.27
5 | (Poland) Kwiatkowski | +0.51
12 | (Russia) Wild
8 | (Italy) Coratti
9 | (Austria) Payer | +0.14
1 | (Russia) Loginov
16 | (Austria) Prommegger | +1.14
2 | (Slovenia) Mastnak
15 | (Germany) Huber | +12.94
7 | (Austria) Mathies
10 | (South Korea) Kim | +8.97
6 | (Germany) Baumeister
11 | (Russia) Sobolev | DNF
3 | (Canada) Anderson
14 | (Switzerland) Caviezel | +0.05

Quarterfinals
4 | (Slovenia) Košir | DNF
12 | (Russia) Wild
8 | (Italy) Coratti | DNF
1 | (Russia) Loginov
2 | (Slovenia) Mastnak
7 | (Austria) Mathies | +0.31
6 | (Germany) Baumeister
14 | (Switzerland) Caviezel | +0.31

Semifinals
12 | (Russia) Wild | +3.21
1 | (Russia) Loginov
2 | (Slovenia) Mastnak
6 | (Germany) Baumeister | +20.87

Finals
1 | (Russia) Loginov
2 | (Slovenia) Mastnak | DNF
Third place
12 | (Russia) Wild | +3.55
6 | (Germany) Baumeister
