= Snowboarding at the 2013 Winter Universiade =

Snowboarding at the 2013 Winter Universiade was held at Monte Bondone from December 11 to December 21, 2013.

== Men's events ==
| Event | Gold | | Silver | | Bronze | |
|---|---|---|---|---|---|---|
| Halfpipe | Ruben Verges; Spain | 88.75 | Hu Yi; China | 84.25 | Rafael Imhof; Switzerland | 76.00 |
| Slopestyle | Philippe Haenni; Switzerland | 86.25 | Billy Wandling; United States | 84.75 | Rafael Imhof; Switzerland | 81.25 |
| Parallel giant slalom | Sebastian Kislinger; Austria | | Aaron March; Italy | | Tim Mastnak; Slovenia | |
| Snowboard cross | Hanno Douschan; Austria | | Nikolay Olyunin; Russia | | Leo Trespeuch; France | |

== Women's events ==
| Event | Gold | | Silver | | Bronze | |
|---|---|---|---|---|---|---|
| Halfpipe | Li Shuang; China | 91.00 | Sun Zhifeng; China | 80.25 | Xu Xiujuan; China | 76.75 |
| Slopestyle | Natalie Good; New Zealand | 81.25 | Carla Somaini; Switzerland | 78.25 | Caroline Hoeckel; Switzerland | 74.75 |
| Parallel giant slalom | Julia Dujmovits; Austria | | Sabine Schoeffmann; Austria | | Selina Jörg; Germany | |
| Snowboard cross | Eva Samková; Czech Republic | | Katerina Chourová; Czech Republic | | Zuzanna Smykala; Poland | |
