= 2018–19 FIS Snowboard World Cup =

International snowboarding competition

| Discipline | Men | Women |
| Parallel overall | (Russia) Andrey Sobolev | (Czech Republic) Ester Ledecká |
| Parallel giant slalom | (Slovenia) Tim Mastnak | (Czech Republic) Ester Ledecká |
| Parallel slalom | (Germany) Stefan Baumeister | (Switzerland) Julie Zogg |
| Snowboard cross | (Austria) Alessandro Hämmerle | (Czech Republic) Eva Samková |
| Freestyle overall | (United States) Chris Corning | (Japan) Miyabi Onitsuka |
| Halfpipe | (Japan) Yūto Totsuka | (China) Cai Xuetong |
| Slopestyle | (United States) Chris Corning | (Japan) Miyabi Onitsuka |
| Big Air | (Japan) Takeru Otsuka | (Japan) Reira Iwabuchi |
- Nations Cup overall: Switzerland

Competition

The 2018–19 FIS Snowboard World Cup was the 25th World Cup season in snowboarding organised by International Ski Federation. The season started on 8 September 2018 in Cardrona, New Zealand and concluded on 24 March 2019 in Winterberg, Germany. Competitions consisted of parallel slalom, parallel giant slalom, snowboard cross, halfpipe, slopestyle and big air.

== Men ==
=== Snowboard Cross ===
| Date | Place | Event | Winner | Second | Third |
|---|---|---|---|---|---|
| 15 December 2018 | (Austria) Montafon | SBX | Cancelled | | |
| 21 December 2018 | (Italy) Cervinia | SBX | (Germany) Martin Nörl | (Italy) Omar Visintin | (Austria) Hanno Douschan |
| 22 December 2018 | (Italy) Cervinia | SBX | (Italy) Emanuel Perathoner | (United States) Jake Vedder | (Germany) Martin Nörl |
FIS Snowboarding World Championships 2019 (31 January - 10 February)
| 9 February 2019 | (Germany) Feldberg | SBX | (Australia) Cameron Bolton | (Germany) Paul Berg | (Germany) Konstantin Schad |
| 2 March 2019 | (Spain) Baqueira Beret | SBX | (Austria) Alessandro Hämmerle | (Australia) Adam Lambert | (Canada) Kevin Hill |
| 16 March 2019 | (Switzerland) Veysonnaz | SBX | (Spain) Lucas Eguibar | (Austria) Alessandro Hämmerle | (Australia) Cameron Bolton |

=== Parallel ===
| Date | Place | Event | Winner | Second | Third |
|---|---|---|---|---|---|
| 13 December 2018 | (Italy) Carezza | PGS | (Slovenia) Tim Mastnak | (Austria) Benjamin Karl | (Austria) Sebastian Kislinger |
| 15 December 2018 | (Italy) Cortina d'Ampezzo | PGS | (Italy) Roland Fischnaller | (Switzerland) Nevin Galmarini | (Austria) Benjamin Karl |
| 8 January 2019 | (Austria) Bad Gastein | PSL | (Germany) Stefan Baumeister | (Switzerland) Dario Caviezel | (Austria) Benjamin Karl |
| 19 January 2019 | (Slovenia) Rogla | PGS | (Italy) Edwin Coratti | (Italy) Daniele Bagozza | (Slovenia) Rok Marguč |
| 26 January 2019 | (Russia) Moscow | PSL | (Russia) Andrey Sobolev | (Switzerland) Dario Caviezel | (Russia) Maksim Rogozin |
FIS Snowboarding World Championships 2019 (31 January - 10 February)
| 16 February 2019 | (South Korea) Pyeongchang | PGS | (Slovenia) Žan Košir | (Austria) Lukas Mathies | (Austria) Andreas Prommegger |
| 17 February 2019 | (South Korea) Pyeongchang | PGS | (Austria) Andreas Prommegger | (France) Sylvain Dufour | (South Korea) Sangho Lee |
| 23 February 2019 | (China) Secret Garden | PGS | (Slovenia) Tim Mastnak | (Russia) Andrey Sobolev | (Germany) Stefan Baumeister |
| 24 February 2019 | (China) Secret Garden | PSL | (Italy) Daniele Bagozza | (Russia) Dmitry Loginov | (Italy) Roland Fischnaller |
| 9 March 2019 | (Switzerland) Scuol | PGS | (Russia) Andrey Sobolev | (Russia) Dmitry Loginov | (Switzerland) Dario Caviezel |
| 23 March 2019 | (Germany) Winterberg | PSL | (Austria) Lukas Mathies | (Germany) Stefan Baumeister | (Slovenia) Žan Košir |

=== Big Air ===
| Date | Place | Event | Winner | Second | Third |
|---|---|---|---|---|---|
| 8 September 2018 | (New Zealand) Cardrona | BA | (United States) Chris Corning | (Japan) Takeru Otsuka | (Norway) Mons Røisland |
| 3 November 2018 | (Italy) Modena | BA | (Japan) Takeru Otsuka | (United States) Chris Corning | (Finland) Kalle Järvilehto |
| 24 November 2018 | (China) Beijing | BA | (Sweden) Sven Thorgren | (Japan) Takeru Otsuka | (Austria) Clemens Millauer |
FIS Snowboarding World Championships 2019 (31 January - 10 February)
| 16 March 2019 | (Canada) Quebec City | BA | (Belgium) Seppe Smits | (Finland) Kalle Järvilehto | (Switzerland) Jonas Bösiger |
| 22 March 2019 | (Norway) Oslo | BA | Cancelled | | |

=== Halfpipe ===
| Date | Place | Event | Winner | Second | Third |
|---|---|---|---|---|---|
| 8 December 2018 | (United States) Copper Mountain | HP | (Australia) Scotty James | (United States) Toby Miller | (United States) Chase Josey |
| 21 December 2018 | (China) Secret Garden | HP | (Switzerland) Jan Scherrer | (Japan) Ruka Hirano | (Japan) Yūto Totsuka |
| 19 January 2019 | (Switzerland) Laax | HP | (Australia) Scotty James | (Japan) Yūto Totsuka | (United States) Jake Pates |
FIS Snowboarding World Championships 2019 (31 January - 10 February)
| 15 February 2019 | (Canada) Calgary | HP | (Japan) Yūto Totsuka | (Japan) Ruka Hirano | (Canada) Derek Livingston |
| 9 March 2019 | (United States) Mammoth | HP | (Japan) Yūto Totsuka | (Switzerland) Patrick Burgener | (Canada) Derek Livingston |

=== Slopestyle ===
| Date | Place | Event | Winner | Second | Third |
|---|---|---|---|---|---|
| 21 December 2018 | (China) Secret Garden | SS | (Japan) Takeru Otsuka | (Sweden) Niklas Mattsson | (Russia) Vlad Khadarin |
| 12 January 2019 | (Austria) Kreischberg | SS | (Norway) Mons Røisland | (United States) Chris Corning | (Japan) Hiroaki Kunitake |
| 18 January 2019 | (Switzerland) Laax | SS | (United States) Chris Corning | (Norway) Ståle Sandbech | (Switzerland) Moritz Thönen |
| 26 January 2019 | (Italy) Seiser Alm | SS | (Norway) Markus Olimstad | (Norway) Stian Kleivdal | (United States) Lyon Farrell |
FIS Snowboarding World Championships 2019 (31 January - 10 February)
| 9 March 2019 | (United States) Mammoth | SS | (United States) Redmond Gerard | (United States) Judd Henkes | (Japan) Ruki Tobita |
| 17 March 2019 | (Canada) Quebec | SS | Cancelled | | |

== Ladies ==
=== Snowboard Cross ===
| Date | Place | Event | Winner | Second | Third |
|---|---|---|---|---|---|
| 15 December 2018 | (Austria) Montafon | SBX | Cancelled | | |
| 21 December 2018 | (Italy) Cervinia | SBX | (United States) Lindsey Jacobellis | (Czech Republic) Eva Samková | (United Kingdom) Charlotte Bankes |
| 22 December 2018 | (Italy) Cervinia | SBX | (Czech Republic) Eva Samková | (United States) Lindsey Jacobellis | (Italy) Michela Moioli |
FIS Snowboarding World Championships 2019 (31 January - 10 February)
| 9 February 2019 | (Germany) Feldberg | SBX | (United States) Lindsey Jacobellis | (Italy) Michela Moioli | (Czech Republic) Eva Samková |
| 2 March 2019 | (Spain) Baqueira Beret | SBX | (Czech Republic) Eva Samková | (France) Chloé Trespeuch | (United States) Lindsey Jacobellis |
| 16 March 2019 | (Switzerland) Veysonnaz | SBX | (Czech Republic) Eva Samková | (France) Chloé Trespeuch | (Italy) Michela Moioli |

=== Parallel ===
| Date | Place | Event | Winner | Second | Third |
|---|---|---|---|---|---|
| 13 December 2018 | (Italy) Carezza | PGS | (Italy) Nadya Ochner | (Czech Republic) Ester Ledecká | (Germany) Ramona Theresia Hofmeister |
| 15 December 2018 | (Italy) Cortina d'Ampezzo | PGS | (Czech Republic) Ester Ledecká | (Switzerland) Julie Zogg | (Austria) Sabine Schöffmann |
| 8 January 2019 | (Austria) Bad Gastein | PSL | (Austria) Claudia Riegler | (Poland) Aleksandra Król | (Austria) Sabine Schöffmann |
| 19 January 2019 | (Slovenia) Rogla | PGS | (Germany) Selina Jörg | (Russia) Natalia Soboleva | (Germany) Cheyenne Loch |
| 26 January 2019 | (Russia) Moscow | PSL | (Switzerland) Julie Zogg | (Austria) Sabine Schöffmann | (Russia) Anastasia Kurochkina |
FIS Snowboarding World Championships 2019 (31 January - 10 February)
| 16 February 2019 | (South Korea) Pyeongchang | PGS | (Czech Republic) Ester Ledecká | (Germany) Selina Jörg | (Austria) Sabine Schöffmann |
| 17 February 2019 | (South Korea) Pyeongchang | PGS | (Germany) Ramona Theresia Hofmeister | (Austria) Sabine Schöffmann | (Czech Republic) Ester Ledecká |
| 23 February 2019 | (China) Secret Garden | PGS | (Germany) Ramona Theresia Hofmeister | (Czech Republic) Ester Ledecká | (Germany) Selina Jörg |
| 24 February 2019 | (China) Secret Garden | PSL | (China) Gong Naiying | (Switzerland) Julie Zogg | (Germany) Selina Jörg |
| 9 March 2019 | (Switzerland) Scuol | PGS | (Russia) Milena Bykova | (Czech Republic) Ester Ledecká | (Germany) Cheyenne Loch |
| 23 March 2019 | (Germany) Winterberg | PSL | (Switzerland) Patrizia Kummer | (Germany) Selina Jörg | (Switzerland) Ladina Jenny |

=== Big Air ===
| Date | Place | Event | Winner | Second | Third |
|---|---|---|---|---|---|
| 8 September 2018 | (New Zealand) Cardrona | BA | (Japan) Reira Iwabuchi | (Japan) Miyabi Onitsuka | (Slovakia) Klaudia Medlová |
| 3 November 2018 | (Italy) Modena | BA | (Japan) Reira Iwabuchi | (Japan) Miyabi Onitsuka | (Austria) Anna Gasser |
| 24 November 2018 | (China) Beijing | BA | (Austria) Anna Gasser | (Japan) Miyabi Onitsuka | (Canada) Laurie Blouin |
FIS Snowboarding World Championships 2019 (31 January - 10 February)
| 16 March 2019 | (Canada) Quebec City | BA | (United States) Julia Marino | (Canada) Laurie Blouin | (Slovakia) Klaudia Medlová |
| 22 March 2019 | (Norway) Oslo | BA | Cancelled | | |

=== Halfpipe ===
| Date | Place | Event | Winner | Second | Third |
|---|---|---|---|---|---|
| 8 December 2018 | (United States) Cooper Mountain | HP | (United States) Chloe Kim | (United States) Maddie Mastro | (China) Cai Xuetong |
| 21 December 2018 | (China) Secret Garden | HP | (China) Cai Xuetong | (Switzerland) Verena Rohrer | (Japan) Kurumi Imai |
| 19 January 2019 | (Switzerland) Laax | HP | (United States) Chloe Kim | (Spain) Queralt Castellet | (United States) Arielle Gold |
FIS Snowboarding World Championships 2019 (31 January - 10 February)
| 15 February 2019 | (Canada) Calgary | HP | (Spain) Queralt Castellet | (China) Cai Xuetong | (Japan) Sena Tomita |
| 9 March 2019 | (United States) Mammoth | HP | (China) Cai Xuetong | (Japan) Sena Tomita | (Switzerland) Verena Rohrer |

=== Slopestyle ===
| Date | Place | Event | Winner | Second | Third |
|---|---|---|---|---|---|
| 21 December 2018 | (China) Secret Garden | SS | (Japan) Miyabi Onitsuka | (Japan) Reira Iwabuchi | (France) Lucile Lefevre |
| 12 January 2019 | (Austria) Kreischberg | SS | (Japan) Miyabi Onitsuka | (Austria) Anna Gasser | (Norway) Silje Norendal |
| 18 January 2019 | (Switzerland) Laax | SS | (Norway) Silje Norendal | (Switzerland) Celia Petrig | (Switzerland) Sina Candrian |
| 26 January 2019 | (Italy) Seiser Alm | SS | (Switzerland) Isabel Derungs | (Canada) Brooke Voigt | (Canada) Jasmine Baird |
FIS Snowboarding World Championships 2019 (31 January - 10 February)
| 9 March 2019 | (United States) Mammoth | SS | Cancelled | | |
| 17 March 2019 | (Canada) Quebec | SS | Cancelled | | |

== Team ==
=== Parallel mixed ===
| Date | Place | Event | Winner | Second | Third |
|---|---|---|---|---|---|
| 9 January 2019 | (Austria) Bad Gastein | PSL_{M} | Austria I Daniela Ulbing; Benjamin Karl | Italy I Nadya Ochner; Aaron March | Switzerland I Patrizia Kummer; Dario Caviezel |
| 27 January 2019 | (Russia) Moscow | PSL_{M} | Austria I Daniela Ulbing; Benjamin Karl | Russia I Natalia Soboleva; Andrey Sobolev | Switzerland III Julie Zogg; Dario Caviezel |
| 24 March 2019 | (Germany) Winterberg | PSL_{M} | Austria I Daniela Ulbing; Benjamin Karl | Switzerland I Patrizia Kummer; Dario Caviezel | Germany I Selina Jörg; Stefan Baumeister |

=== Snowboardcross team ===
| Date | Place | Event | Winner | Second | Third |
|---|---|---|---|---|---|
| 16 December 2018 | (Austria) Montafon | SBT_{M} | Cancelled | | |
| 16 December 2018 | (Austria) Montafon | SBT_{W} | Cancelled | | |
| 2 February 2020 | (Germany) Feldberg | SBT_{Mx} | Cancelled | | |
FIS Snowboarding World Championships 2019 (31 January - 10 February)

== Men's standings ==
=== Parallel overall (PSL/PGS) ===
| Rank | after all 11 races | Points |
|---|---|---|
| 1 | (Russia) Andrey Sobolev | 4625 |
| 2 | (Slovenia) Tim Mastnak | 4116 |
| 3 | (Italy) Roland Fischnaller | 3989.4 |
| 4 | (Russia) Dmitry Loginov | 3812.2 |
| 5 | (Austria) Lukas Mathies | 3600 |

=== Parallel slalom ===
| Rank | after all 4 races | Points |
|---|---|---|
| 1 | (Germany) Stefan Baumeister | 2020 |
| 2 | (Russia) Andrey Sobolev | 1990 |
| 3 | (Switzerland) Dario Caviezel | 1870 |
| 4 | (Austria) Lukas Mathies | 1650 |
| 5 | (Russia) Dmitry Loginov | 1600 |

=== Parallel giant slalom ===
| Rank | after all 7 races | Points |
|---|---|---|
| 1 | (Slovenia) Tim Mastnak | 3336 |
| 2 | (Austria) Andreas Prommegger | 3070 |
| 3 | (Italy) Roland Fischnaller | 2709.4 |
| 4 | (Russia) Andrey Sobolev | 2635 |
| 5 | (Italy) Edwin Coratti | 2350 |

=== Snowboard Cross ===
| Rank | after all 5 races | Points |
|---|---|---|
| 1 | (Austria) Alessandro Hämmerle | 2440 |
| 2 | (Italy) Omar Visintin | 2035 |
| 3 | (Germany) Martin Noerl | 1970 |
| 4 | (Spain) Lucas Eguibar | 1840 |
| 5 | (Australia) Cameron Bolton | 1822 |

=== Freestyle overall (BA/SBS/HP) ===
| Rank | after all 14 races | Points |
|---|---|---|
| 1 | (United States) Chris Corning | 4340 |
| 2 | (Japan) Takeru Otsuka | 4100 |
| 3 | (Japan) Yūto Totsuka | 3760 |
| 4 | (Japan) Ruka Hirano | 2410 |
| 5 | (Japan) Ruki Tobita | 2330 |

=== Big Air ===
| Rank | after all 4 races | Points |
|---|---|---|
| 1 | (Japan) Takeru Otsuka | 2600 |
| 2 | (United States) Chris Corning | 2090 |
| 3 | (Finland) Kalle Järvilehto | 1400 |
| 4 | (Austria) Clemens Millauer | 1340 |
| 5 | (Japan) Ruki Tobita | 1045 |

=== Halfpipe ===
| Rank | after all 5 races | Points |
|---|---|---|
| 1 | (Japan) Yūto Totsuka | 3760 |
| 2 | (Japan) Ruka Hirano | 2410 |
| 3 | (Switzerland) Jan Scherrer | 2240 |
| 4 | (Switzerland) Patrick Burgener | 2020 |
| 5 | (Australia) Scotty James | 2000 |

=== Slopestyle ===
| Rank | after all 5 races | Points |
|---|---|---|
| 1 | (United States) Chris Corning | 2250 |
| 2 | (United States) Judd Henkes | 1700 |
| 3 | (United States) Lyon Farrell | 1627 |
| 4 | (United States) Ryan Stassel | 1590 |
| 5 | (Japan) Takeru Otsuka | 1500 |

== Ladies' standings ==
=== Parallel overall (PSL/PGS) ===
| Rank | after all 11 races | Points |
|---|---|---|
| 1 | (Czech Republic) Ester Ledecká | 5900 |
| 2 | (Germany) Selina Jörg | 5619.7 |
| 3 | (Austria) Sabine Schöffmann | 5250 |
| 4 | (Switzerland) Julie Zogg | 4770 |
| 5 | (Italy) Nadya Ochner | 4080 |

=== Parallel slalom ===
| Rank | after all 4 races | Points |
|---|---|---|
| 1 | (Switzerland) Julie Zogg | 2220 |
| 2 | (Germany) Selina Jörg | 2200 |
| 3 | (Switzerland) Patrizia Kummer | 2180 |
| 4 | (Austria) Sabine Schöffmann | 2060 |
| 5 | (Austria) Claudia Riegler | 1476 |

=== Parallel giant slalom ===
| Rank | after all 7 races | Points |
|---|---|---|
| 1 | (Czech Republic) Ester Ledecká | 5000 |
| 2 | (Germany) Selina Jörg | 3419.7 |
| 3 | (Germany) Ramona Theresia Hofmeister | 3258.2 |
| 4 | (Italy) Nadya Ochner | 3230 |
| 5 | (Austria) Sabine Schöffmann | 3190 |

=== Snowboard Cross ===
| Rank | after all 5 races | Points |
|---|---|---|
| 1 | (Czech Republic) Eva Samková | 4400 |
| 2 | (United States) Lindsey Jacobellis | 3850 |
| 3 | (Italy) Michela Moioli | 2650 |
| 4 | (United Kingdom) Charlotte Bankes | 2350 |
| 5 | (France) Chloé Trespeuch | 2100 |

=== Freestyle overall (BA/SBS/HP) ===
| Rank | after all 14 races | Points |
|---|---|---|
| 1 | (Japan) Miyabi Onitsuka | 4400 |
| 2 | (Japan) Reira Iwabuchi | 4100 |
| 3 | (China) Cai Xuetong | 3900 |
| 4 | (Austria) Anna Gasser | 2640 |
| 5 | (Spain) Queralt Castellet | 2520 |

=== Big Air ===
| Rank | after all 4 races | Points |
|---|---|---|
| 1 | (Japan) Reira Iwabuchi | 2400 |
| 2 | (Japan) Miyabi Onitsuka | 2400 |
| 3 | (Slovakia) Klaudia Medlová | 1800 |
| 4 | (Austria) Anna Gasser | 1600 |
| 5 | (Canada) Laurie Blouin | 1400 |

=== Halfpipe ===
| Rank | after all 5 races | Points |
|---|---|---|
| 1 | (China) Cai Xuetong | 3900 |
| 2 | (Spain) Queralt Castellet | 2520 |
| 3 | (Switzerland) Verena Rohrer | 2410 |
| 4 | (United States) Chloe Kim | 2000 |
| 5 | (Japan) Kurumi Imai | 1960 |

=== Slopestyle ===
| Rank | after all 4 races | Points |
|---|---|---|
| 1 | (Japan) Miyabi Onitsuka | 2000 |
| 2 | (Japan) Reira Iwabuchi | 1700 |
| 3 | (Switzerland) Isabel Derungs | 1680 |
| 4 | (Norway) Silje Norendal | 1600 |
| 5 | (Switzerland) Sina Candrian | 1600 |

== Team ==
=== Parallel Slalom Team ===
| Rank | after all 3 races | Points |
|---|---|---|
| 1 | Austria I | 3000 |
| 2 | Italy I | 1590 |
| 3 | Russia I | 1510 |
| 4 | Switzerland I | 1400 |
| 5 | Slovenia I | 1140 |

== Nations Cup ==
=== Overall ===
| Rank | after all 62 races | Points |
|---|---|---|
| 1 | Switzerland | 39134.40 |
| 2 | Japan | 31210.30 |
| 3 | Austria | 31073.50 |
| 4 | United States | 29687.20 |
| 5 | Italy | 28143.00 |

== Podium table by nation ==
Table showing the World Cup podium places (gold–1st place, silver–2nd place, bronze–3rd place) by the countries represented by the athletes.

| Rank | Nation | Gold | Silver | Bronze | Total |
|---|---|---|---|---|---|
| 1 | Japan | 8 | 10 | 5 | 23 |
| 2 | United States | 8 | 7 | 5 | 20 |
| 3 | Austria | 8 | 6 | 10 | 24 |
| 4 | Germany | 5 | 4 | 9 | 18 |
| 5 | Italy | 5 | 4 | 3 | 12 |
| 6 | Czech Republic | 5 | 4 | 2 | 11 |
| 7 | Switzerland | 4 | 9 | 8 | 21 |
| 8 | Russia | 3 | 5 | 3 | 11 |
| 9 | Norway | 3 | 2 | 2 | 7 |
| 10 | Australia | 3 | 1 | 1 | 5 |
| 10 | China | 3 | 1 | 1 | 5 |
| 12 | Slovenia | 3 | 0 | 2 | 5 |
| 13 | Spain | 2 | 1 | 0 | 3 |
| 14 | Sweden | 1 | 1 | 0 | 2 |
| 15 | Belgium | 1 | 0 | 0 | 1 |
| 16 | France | 0 | 3 | 1 | 4 |
| 17 | Canada | 0 | 2 | 5 | 7 |
| 18 | Finland | 0 | 1 | 1 | 2 |
| 19 | Poland | 0 | 1 | 0 | 1 |
| 20 | Slovakia | 0 | 0 | 2 | 2 |
| 21 | Great Britain | 0 | 0 | 1 | 1 |
| 21 | South Korea | 0 | 0 | 1 | 1 |
| Totals (22 entries) | | 62 | 62 | 62 | 186 |
