= Snowboarding at the 2006 Winter Olympics – Women's parallel giant slalom =

Women's parallel giant slalom at the XX Olympic Winter Games
- Venue: Bardonecchia
- Date: 23 February 2006
- Competitors: 30 from 16 nations

Medalists
| 1st place, gold medalist(s) | | Daniela Meuli | Switzerland |
| 2nd place, silver medalist(s) | | Amelie Kober | Germany |
| 3rd place, bronze medalist(s) | | Rosey Fletcher | United States |

The women's parallel giant slalom event in snowboarding at the 2006 Winter Olympics was held in Bardonecchia, a village in the Province of Turin, Italy. The competition took place on 23 February 2006.

== Medalists ==
| Gold | Daniela Meuli; Switzerland |
| Silver | Amelie Kober; Germany |
| Bronze | Rosey Fletcher; United States |

== Qualification ==
The qualification runs started at 11 a.m.(UTC+1)

The athletes were allowed two runs, one on the blue course and one on the red course. The two times were added, and the top 16 snowboarders moved on to the 1/8 finals.

| Rank | Bib | Name | Nationality | Blue course (time) | Rank | Red course (time) | Rank | Total time |
|---|---|---|---|---|---|---|---|---|
| 1 | 19 | Ekaterina Tudigescheva | Russia | 40.18 | 4 | 40.67 | 5 | 1:20.85 |
| 2 | 8 | Rosey Fletcher | United States | 39.30 | 1 | 41.58 | 19 | 1:20.88 |
| 3 | 1 | Julie Pomagalski | France | 41.02 | 15 | 40.00 | 2 | 1:21.02 |
| 4 | 2 | Svetlana Boldikova | Russia | 40.05 | 2 | 41.27 | 13 | 1:21.32 |
| 5 | 4 | Amelie Kober | Germany | 40.31 | 5 | 41.02 | 11 | 1:21.33 |
| 6 | 14 | Daniela Meuli | Switzerland | 40.56 | 6 | 40.80 | 8 | 1:21.36 |
| 7 | 16 | Ursula Bruhin | Switzerland | 40.74 | 9 | 40.73 | 6 | 1:21.47 |
| 8 | 11 | Doris Günther | Austria | 40.96 | 13 | 40.53 | 3 | 1:21.49 |
| 9 | 26 | Tomoka Takeuchi | Japan | 40.76 | 10 | 40.91 | 10 | 1:21.67 |
| 10 | 7 | Heidi Krings | Austria | 42.29 | 23 | 39.50 | 1 | 1:21.79 |
| 11 | 5 | Doresia Krings | Austria | 40.63 | 8 | 41.39 | 15 | 1:22.02 |
| 12 | 25 | Nicolien Sauerbreij | Netherlands | 41.41 | 19 | 40.76 | 7 | 1:22.17 |
| 13 | 23 | Isabella Dal Balcon | Italy | 40.17 | 3 | 42.38 | 24 | 1:22.55 |
| 14 | 3 | Isabelle Blanc | France | 41.24 | 17 | 41.43 | 16 | 1:22.67 |
| 15 | 6 | Marion Posch | Italy | 41.43 | 20 | 41.46 | 17 | 1:22.89 |
| 16 | 15 | Aprilia Hagglof | Sweden | 41.34 | 18 | 41.77 | 20 | 1:23.11 |
| 17 | 10 | Jagna Marczulajtis | Poland | 40.60 | 7 | 42.52 | 25 | 1:23.12 |
| 18 | 21 | Eri Yanetani | Japan | 40.91 | 11 | 42.30 | 23 | 1:23.21 |
| 19 | 27 | Corinna Boccacini | Italy | 42.06 | 22 | 41.34 | 13 | 1:23.40 |
| 20 | 9 | Alexa Loo | Canada | 42.94 | 26 | 40.57 | 4 | 1:23.51 |
| 21 | 28 | Olga Golovanova | Russia | 41.74 | 21 | 41.85 | 21 | 1:23.59 |
| 22 | 12 | Michelle Gorgone | United States | 43.59 | 28 | 40.84 | 9 | 1:24.43 |
| 23 | 17 | Petra Elsterova | Czech Republic | 40.98 | 14 | 43.83 | 27 | 1:24.81 |
| 24 | 29 | Niina Sarias | Finland | 42.73 | 24 | 42.23 | 22 | 1:24.96 |
| 25 | 30 | Aleksandra Zhekova | Bulgaria | 43.49 | 27 | 41.52 | 18 | 1:25.01 |
| 26 | 20 | Carmen Ranigler | Italy | 41.03 | 16 | 44.20 | 28 | 1:25.23 |
| 27 | 22 | Blanka Isielonis | Poland | 42.86 | 25 | 43.01 | 26 | 1:25.87 |
| 28 | 13 | Manuela Riegler | Austria | 50.47 | 29 | 41.25 | 12 | 1:31.72 |
| 29 | 24 | Johanna Shaw | Australia | 53.76 | 30 | 45.10 | 29 | 1:38.86 |
| 30 | 18 | Sara Fischer | Sweden | 40.91 | 11 | DNF | - | - |

== Elimination round ==
The elimination rounds started at 2 p.m.(UTC+1)

=== Medal round ===
1/8 finals
1 | Tudigescheva (RUS)
16 | Hagglof (SWE) | +1.13
8 | Günther (AUT)
9 | Takeuchi (JPN) | +0.24
5 | Kober (GER)
12 | Sauerbreij (NED) | +0.03
4 | Boldikova (RUS)
13 | Dal Balcon (ITA) | +18.13
3 | Pomagalski (FRA)
14 | Blanc (FRA) | +1.77
6 | Meuli (SUI)
11 | D. Krings (AUT) | +1.00
7 | Bruhin (SUI)
10 | H. Krings (AUT) | +2.06
2 | Fletcher (USA)
15 | Posch (ITA) | +0.96

Quarterfinals
1 | Tudigescheva (RUS) | +0.66
8 | Günther (AUT)
5 | Kober (GER)
4 | Boldikova (RUS) | +0.07
3 | Pomagalski (FRA) | +1.43
6 | Meuli (SUI)
7 | Bruhin (SUI) | +0.15
2 | Fletcher (USA)

Semifinals
8 | Günther (AUT) | +3.76
5 | Kober (GER)
6 | Meuli (SUI)
2 | Fletcher (USA) | +3.70

Finals
5 | Kober (GER) | +15.97
6 | Meuli (SUI)
Third place
8 | Günther (AUT) | +0.69
2 | Fletcher (USA)

=== Classification 5–8 ===
The four quarterfinal losers entered the consolation bracket, where they raced for positions five through eight.

Placement 5–8
1 | Tudigescheva (RUS)
4 | Boldikova (RUS) | +3.69
3 | Pomagalski (FRA)
10 | Bruhin (SUI) | +4.76

Placement 5–6
1 | Tudigescheva (RUS)
3 | Pomagalski (FRA) | +1.04
Placement 7–8
4 | Boldikova (RUS) | +1.74
10 | Bruhin (SUI)
