= Snowboarding at the 2015 Winter Universiade – Women's halfpipe =

The women's halfpipe competition of the 2015 Winter Universiade was held at Sulayr Snowpark, Sierra Nevada, Spain at February 7, 2015.

== Results ==
=== Qualification ===
| Rank | Bib | Name | Country | Run 1 | Rank | Run 2 | Rank | Best | Notes |
|---|---|---|---|---|---|---|---|---|---|
| 1 | 51 | Cai Xuetong | China | 85.5 | 1 | 88.25 | 1 | 88.25 | Q |
| 2 | 41 | Katarzyna Rusin | Poland | 78 | 2 | 35.25 | 10 | 78 | Q |
| 3 | 45 | Carla Somaini | Switzerland | 73 | 3 | 74.5 | 2 | 74.5 | Q |
| 4 | 52 | Ramona Petrig | Switzerland | 70.75 | 4 | 70.25 | 3 | 70.25 | Q |
| 5 | 50 | Sun Juan | China | 29.75 | 8 | 67.5 | 4 | 67.5 | Q |
| 6 | 55 | Queralt Castellet | Spain | 12 | 13 | 64.5 | 5 | 64.5 | Q |
| 7 | 53 | Zhai Yue | China | 28 | 11 | 60.75 | 6 | 60.75 | |
| 8 | 47 | Celia Petrig | Switzerland | 52 | 5 | 53.5 | 7 | 53.5 | |
| 9 | 44 | Klementyna Kołodziej | Poland | 47.25 | 6 | 40.5 | 9 | 47.25 | |
| 10 | 54 | Anni Halonen | Finland | 24.25 | 12 | 46 | 8 | 46 | |
| 11 | 46 | Anna Moskal | Poland | 40.5 | 7 | 33.25 | 12 | 40.5 | |
| 12 | 42 | Marzena Zając | Poland | 28.75 | 10 | 34.25 | 11 | 34.25 | |
| 13 | 49 | Amber Arazny | Australia | 29 | 9 | 30.75 | 13 | 30.75 | |
| | 43 | Clémence Grimal | France | | | | | | DNS |
| | 48 | Faye Gulini | United States | | | | | | DNS |

=== Finals ===
| Rank | Bib | Name | Country | Run 1 | Rank | Run 2 | Rank | Best | Notes |
|---|---|---|---|---|---|---|---|---|---|
| 1st place, gold medalist(s) | 51 | Cai Xuetong | China | 82.5 | 1 | 75.25 | 1 | 82.5 | |
| 2nd place, silver medalist(s) | 55 | Queralt Castellet | Spain | 37.25 | 5 | 72.25 | 2 | 72.25 | |
| 3rd place, bronze medalist(s) | 45 | Carla Somaini | Switzerland | 51.75 | 4 | 67.75 | 3 | 67.75 | |
| 4 | 50 | Sun Juan | China | 65.75 | 2 | 38.75 | 6 | 65.75 | |
| 5 | 52 | Ramona Petrig | Switzerland | 57.75 | 3 | 63.75 | 4 | 63.75 | |
| 6 | 41 | Katarzyna Rusin | Poland | 28.25 | 6 | 55 | 5 | 55 | |
