= Snowboarding at the 2015 Winter Universiade – Women's slopestyle =

The women's slopestyle competition of the 2015 Winter Universiade was held at Sulayr Snowpark, Sierra Nevada, Spain at February 13, 2015.

== Results ==
Rank	Bib	Name	Country	Run 1	Rank	Run 2	Rank	Best	Notes
1st place, gold medalist(s)	4	Celia Petrig	Switzerland	55.5	5	90.25	1	90.25	
2nd place, silver medalist(s)	2	Courtney Cox	United States	80.25	1	40	8	80.25	
3rd place, bronze medalist(s)	12	Marion Haerty	France	77.75	2	56.5	5	77.75	
4	11	Michaela Davis-Meehan	Australia	35	10	68.25	2	68.25	
5	6	Ramona Petrig	Switzerland	65.25	3	45	7	65.25	
6	15	Faye Gulini	United States	37.75	9	63.5	3	63.5	
7	1	Carla Somaini	Switzerland	31.25	11	58.75	4	58.75	
8	13	Amber Arazny	Australia	56.75	4	34.5	9	56.75	
9	8	Lea Jugovac	Croatia	26	12	52.75	6	52.75	
10	3	Agnieszka Rusin	Poland	50	6	22.25	12	50	
11	7	Ekaterina Kosova	Russia	42.5	7	34	10	42.5	
12	5	Biba Turnbull	Australia	42.25	8	27.75	11	42.25	
	9	Paola Blašković	Croatia	DNS					
	10	Anni Halonen	Finland	DNS					
	14	Giulia Gaspari	Italy	DNS					
