= Dmitry Loginov =

Russian snowboarder (born 2000)

Personal information
- Full name: Dmitry Alekseyevich Loginov
- Nationality: Russia
- Born: 2 February 2000 (age 26) Divnogorsk, Russia
- Height: 1.80 m (5 ft 11 in)

Sport
- Sport: Skiing

World Cup career
- Indiv. podiums: 7
- Indiv. wins: 3
- Team podiums: 1
Medal record
Men's snowboarding
Representing Russian Ski Federation
World Championships
Gold medal – first place	2021 Rogla	Parallel GS
Bronze medal – third place	2021 Rogla	Parallel slalom
Representing Russia
World Championships
Gold medal – first place	2019 Utah	Parallel GS
Gold medal – first place	2019 Utah	Parallel slalom
Junior World Championships
Gold medal – first place	2016 Rogla	Parallel Slalom
Gold medal – first place	2018 Cardrona	Parallel Slalom
Gold medal – first place	2018 Cardrona	Parallel GS
Gold medal – first place	2019 Rogla	Parallel GS
Gold medal – first place	2019 Rogla	Parallel Team
Gold medal – first place	2020 Lachtal	Parallel Slalom
Gold medal – first place	2020 Lachtal	Parallel GS
Gold medal – first place	2020 Lachtal	Parallel Team
Silver medal – second place	2017 Klinovec	Parallel Slalom
Silver medal – second place	2017 Klinovec	Parallel GS

Dmitry Alekseyevich Loginov (Russian: Дмитрий Алексеевич Логинов; born 2 February 2000) is a Russian snowboarder. He is a three-time world champion and a sevenfold junior world champion.

== Career ==
Loginov was born in Divnogorsk, Krasnoyarsk Krai to a weightlifter and a female volleyball player. He had practised karate before switching to snowboarding when he was 10 or 11 years old. It was in the elementary school where he was discovered by future coach Aleksey Derevyagin. At the age of 15 he debuted in international competitions.

Loginov won his first championships title at the FIS Freestyle Ski and Snowboarding World Championships 2019 in Utah in parallel giant slalom. He won another gold medal in parallel slalom, the first ever gold medal in that event for Russia. To date, Loginov is the only snowboarder to win back-to-back events (parallel slalom and parallel giant slalom) in both junior and senior championships. He also became just the third snowboarder winning back-to-back titles in a World Championships.

He repeated gold in the parallel giant slalom at the 2021 World Championships, and also won bronze in the parallel slalom.

== World cup podiums ==
=== Individual podiums ===
- 3 wins – (1 PS, 2 PGS)
- 8 podiums – (4 PS, 4 PGS)

Season	Date	Location	Discipline	Place
2017–18	16 December 2017	Cortina d'Ampezzo, Italy	Parallel Slalom	3rd
2017–18	12 January 2018	Bad Gastein, Austria	Parallel Slalom	1st
2018–19	24 February 2019	Secret Garden, China	Parallel Slalom	2nd
2018–19	9 March 2019	Scuol, Switzerland	Parallel GS	2nd
2019–20	22 February 2020	Pyeongchang, South Korea	Parallel GS	2nd
2019–20	1 March 2020	Blue Mountain, Canada	Parallel GS	1st
2020–21	12 January 2021	Bad Gastein, Austria	Parallel Slalom	2nd
2020–21	6 February 2021	Lake Bannoye, Russia	Parallel GS	1st
2021–22	16 December 2021	Carezza, Italy	Parallel GS	2nd

=== Team podiums ===
- 1 podium – (1 PSL_{M})

Season	Date	Location	Discipline	Place	Teammate(s)
2020–21	12 January 2021	Bad Gastein, Austria	Parallel Slalom Team	3rd	Sofia Nadyrshina
