= Petra Elsterová =

Czech snowboarder (born 1973)

Personal information
- Nationality: Czech
- Born: 7 June 1973 (age 52) Ostrov nad Ohří, Czechoslovakia

Sport
- Sport: Snowboarding

Petra Elsterová (born 7 June 1973) is a Czech former snowboarder. She competed in the women's parallel giant slalom event at the 2006 Winter Olympics.
