= Jules Lefebvre (snowboarder) =

Canadian snowboarder (born 1996)

Personal information
- Born: 12 January 1996 (age 30) Montreal, Quebec, Canada

Sport
- Country: Canada
- Sport: Snowboarding
- Events: Parallel giant slalom, Parallel slalom

Jules Lefebvre (born 12 January 1996) is a retired Canadian snowboarder who competed internationally in the alpine snowboard discipline..

== Career ==
Lefebvre competed at one Senior World Championships in 2021. Lefebvre's best performances came in the parallel slalom event, 26th overall.

In January 2022, Lefebvre was initially not named to Canada's 2022 Olympic team. However, after an appeal process, Lefebvre along with three other snowboarders were added to the team in the parallel giant slalom event. He retired during 2025, and now works for the company Deloitte.
