= Aprilia Hägglöf =

Swedish snowboarder

Personal information
- Nationality: Swedish
- Born: 2 April 1983 (age 41); Stockholm, Sweden

Sport
- Country: Sweden
- Sport: Snowboarding

Aprilia Hägglöf (born 2 April 1983) is a Swedish snowboarder.

She was born in Stockholm. She competed at the 2006 Winter Olympics, in parallel giant slalom.

Her husband Daniel Biveson is also an international snowboarder.
