= Snowboarding at the 2015 Winter Universiade =

Snowboarding at the 2015 Winter Universiade was held at the Sulayr Snowpark in Sierra Nevada, Granada, from February 6 to February 13, 2015.

== Men's events ==
Event	Gold		Silver		Bronze	
Halfpipe	(Japan) Ayumu Nedefuji	91.50	(United States) Zachary Black	90.50	(United States) Broc Waring	85.50
Slopestyle	(Czech Republic) Petr Horák	92.00	(Poland) Piotr Janosz	87.75	(Czech Republic) Martin Mikyska	82.25
Parallel giant slalom	(Germany) Daniel Weis		(South Korea) Choi Bo-gun		(Austria) Alexander Payer	
Snowboard cross	(Russia) Nikolay Olyunin		(Austria) Alessandro Hämmerle		(France) Nathan Birrien	

== Women's events ==
Event	Gold		Silver		Bronze	
Halfpipe	(China) Cai Xuetong	82.50	(Spain) Queralt Castellet	72.25	(Switzerland) Carla Somaini	67.75
Slopestyle	(Switzerland) Celia Petrig	90.25	(United States) Courtney Cox	80.25	(France) Marion Haerty	77.75
Parallel giant slalom	(Switzerland) Patrizia Kummer		(Germany) Selina Jörg		(Italy) Nadya Ochner	
Snowboard cross	(Bulgaria) Aleksandra Zhekova		(France) Chloé Trespeuch		(Switzerland) Simona Meiler	

== Medal table ==
* Host nation (Spain)

Rank	Nation	Gold	Silver	Bronze	Total
1	Switzerland	2	0	2	4
2	Germany	1	1	0	2
3	Czech Republic	1	0	1	2
4	Bulgaria	1	0	0	1
4	China	1	0	0	1
4	Japan	1	0	0	1
4	Russia	1	0	0	1
8	United States	0	2	1	3
9	France	0	1	2	3
10	Austria	0	1	1	2
11	Poland	0	1	0	1
11	South Korea	0	1	0	1
11	Spain*	0	1	0	1
14	Italy	0	0	1	1
Totals (14 entries)		8	8	8	24
