= Snowboarding at the 2011 Winter Universiade =

Snowboarding at the Palandöken Mountain will be held at the Dumlu District in Erzurum, Turkey. The eight events are scheduled for January 28 - February 6, 2011.

== Men's events ==
| Event | Gold | | Silver | | Bronze | |
|---|---|---|---|---|---|---|
| Halfpipe | Ryo Aono; Japan | 29.1 | Kazuumi Fujita; Japan | 27.6 | Ho Jun Kim; South Korea | 26.2 |
| Slopestyle | Event cancelled | | | | | |
| Parallel giant slalom | Kim Sang-Kyum; South Korea | | Sebastian Kislinger; Austria | | Nevin Galmarini; Switzerland | |
| Snowboard cross | Konstantin Schad; Germany | | Omar Visintin; Italy | | Federico Raimo; Italy | |

== Women's events ==
| Event | Gold | | Silver | | Bronze | |
|---|---|---|---|---|---|---|
| Halfpipe | Cai Xuetong; China | 26.8 | Sophie Rodriguez; France | 23.7 | Li Shuang; China | 22.8 |
| Slopestyle | Event cancelled | | | | | |
| Parallel giant slalom | Selina Jörg; Germany | | Annamari Chundak; Ukraine | | Gloria Kotnik; Slovenia | |
| Snowboard cross | Klára Koukalová; Czech Republic | | Claire Chapotot; France | | Martina Krejčová; Czech Republic | |

== Medals table ==
| Rank | Nation | Gold | Silver | Bronze | Total |
|---|---|---|---|---|---|
| 1 | Germany | 2 | 0 | 0 | 2 |
| 2 | Japan | 1 | 1 | 0 | 2 |
| 3 | China | 1 | 0 | 1 | 2 |
| 3 | Czech Republic | 1 | 0 | 1 | 2 |
| 3 | South Korea | 1 | 0 | 1 | 2 |
| 6 | France | 0 | 2 | 0 | 2 |
| 7 | Italy | 0 | 1 | 1 | 2 |
| 8 | Austria | 0 | 1 | 0 | 1 |
| 8 | Ukraine | 0 | 1 | 0 | 1 |
| 10 | Slovenia | 0 | 0 | 1 | 1 |
| 10 | Switzerland | 0 | 0 | 1 | 1 |
| Totals (11 entries) | | 6 | 6 | 6 | 18 |
