= Michał Ligocki =

Polish snowboarder (born 1985)

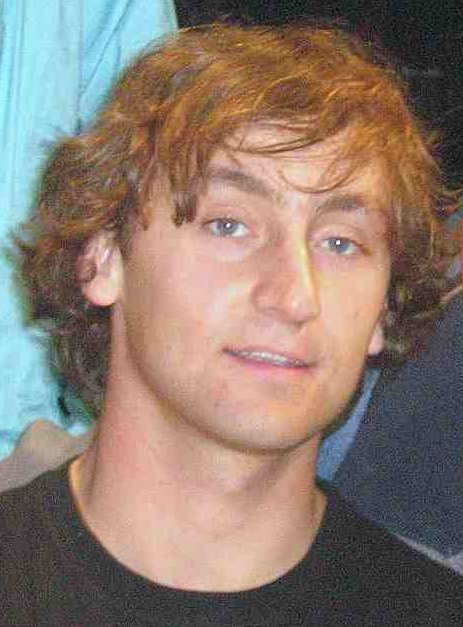
Michał Ligocki

Michał Ligocki (born 31 October 1985, in Cieszyn) is a Polish snowboarder. He is a participant at the 2014 Winter Olympics in Sochi.
