= Svetlana Boldykova =

Russian snowboarder (born 1982)

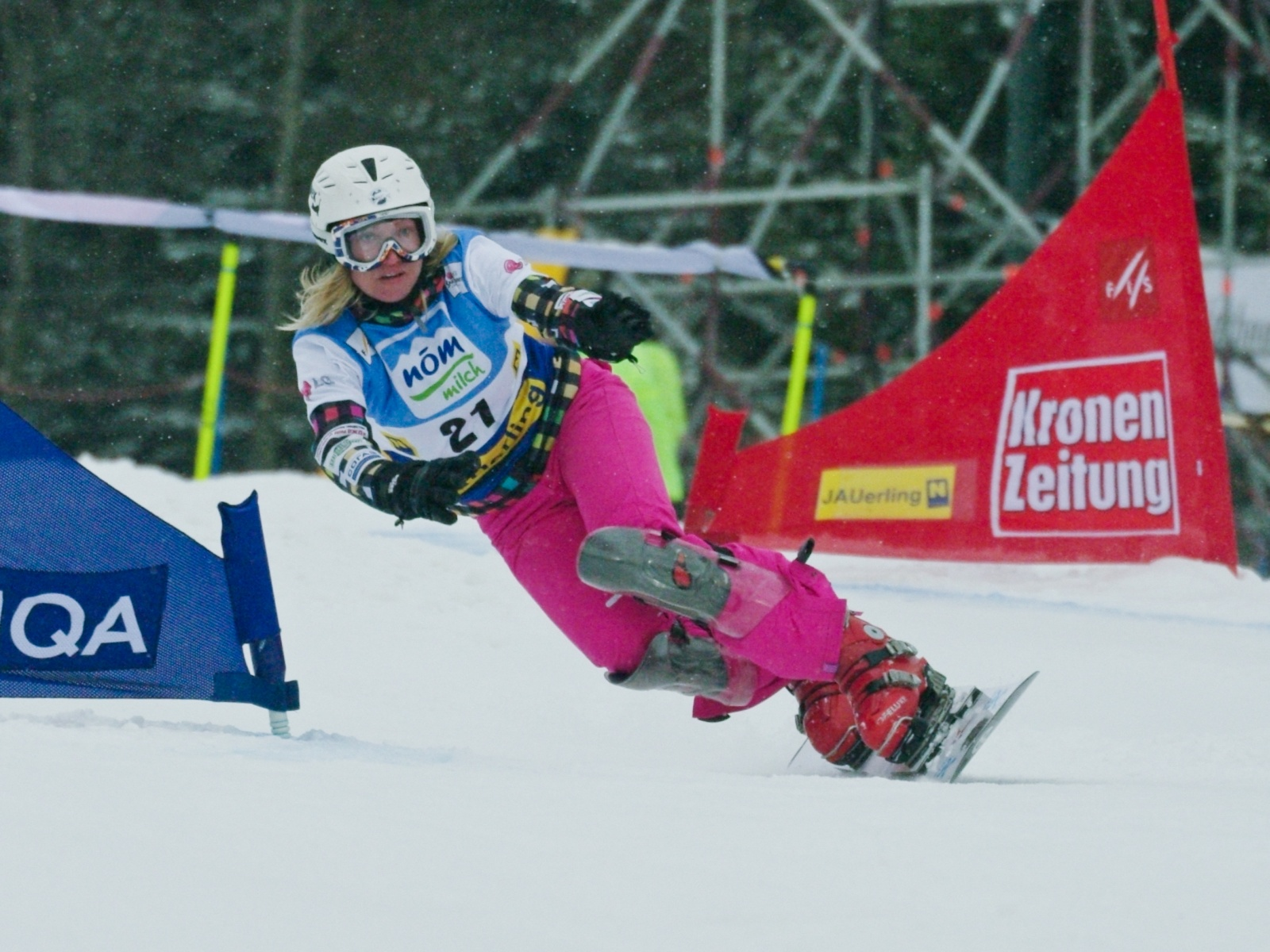
- Boldykova in 2012

Medal record

Women's snowboarding

Representing Russia

FIS Snowboarding World Championships
Silver medal – second place	2005 Whistler	Parallel Giant Slalom

Svetlana Sergeyevna Boldykova (Russian: Светлана Серге́евна Болдыкова; born 7 July 1982 in Tashtagol, Kemerovo Oblast) is a Russian professional snowboarder based in Tashtagol. Boldikova has to date competed in one Winter Olympic Games in 2006 where she would finish 8th along with several world cups but has to date only achieved one podium position a third placing in 2007 in Korea.
