= Olga Golovanova (snowboarder) =

Russian snowboarder (born 1983)

Personal information
- Nationality: Russian
- Born: 13 September 1983 (age 41); Tashtagol, Russia

Sport
- Sport: Snowboarding

Olga Golovanova (born 13 September 1983) is a Russian snowboarder. She competed in the women's parallel giant slalom event at the 2006 Winter Olympics.
