= Nikolay Olyunin =

Russian snowboarder (born 1991)

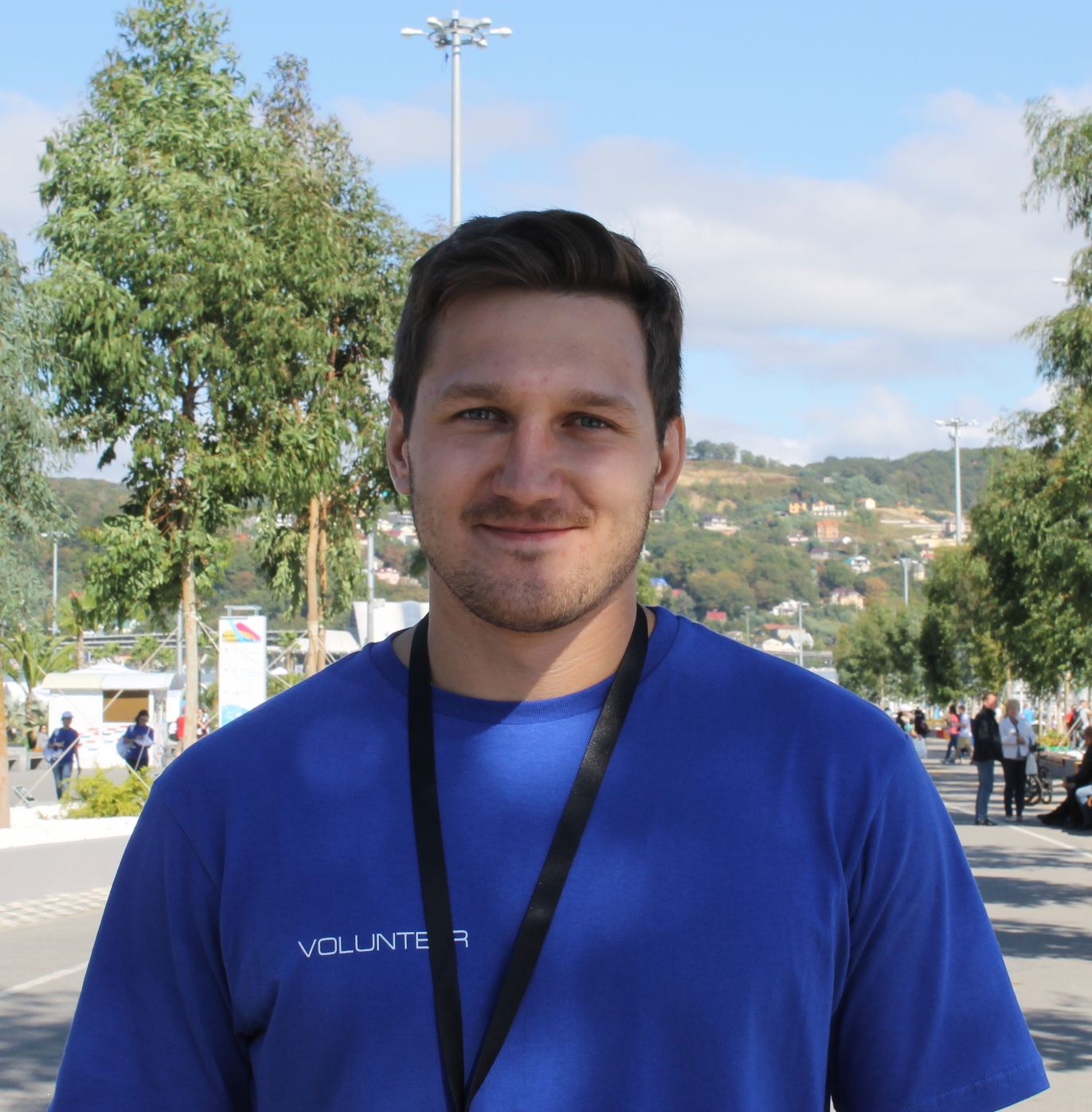
- Olyunin in 2015

Personal information
- Nationality: Russian
- Born: Nikolay Igoryevich Olyunin; October 23, 1991 (age 34) Krasnoyarsk, Russia
- Height: 180 cm (5 ft 11 in)
- Weight: 84 kg (185 lb)

Sport
- Sport: Snowboarding
Medal record
Representing Russia
Olympic Games
| Silver medal – second place | 2014 Sochi | Snowboard cross |
Winter Universiade
| Gold medal – first place | 2015 Granada | Snowboard cross |
| Silver medal – second place | 2013 Trentino | Snowboard cross |
World Junior Championship
| Gold medal – first place | 2010 Cardona | Snowboard cross |

Nikolay Igoryevich Olyunin (Russian: Николай Игоревич Олюнин; born 23 October 1991) is a Russian snowboarder who won a silver medal at the 2014 Winter Olympics.

== World cup podiums ==
=== Race podiums ===
- 1 win – (1 SBX)
- 6 podiums – (6 SBX)

| Season | Date | Location | Discipline | Place |
|---|---|---|---|---|
| 2011–12 | 21 February 2012 | Stoneham, Canada | Snowboardcross | 2nd |
| 2013–14 | 15 March 2014 | La Molina, Italy | Snowboardcross | 2nd |
| 2014–15 | 14 March 2015 | Veysonnaz, Switzerland | Snowboardcross | 2nd |
| 2015–16 | 12 December 2015 | Montafon, Austria | Snowboardcross | 3rd |
| 2015–16 | 23 January 2016 | Feldberg, Germany | Snowboardcross | 1st |
| 2015–16 | 24 January 2016 | Feldberg, Germany | Snowboardcross | 2nd |
