= Blanka Isielonis =

Polish snowboarder

Personal information
- Nationality: Polish
- Born: 22 May 1978 (age 46); Kraków, Poland

Sport
- Sport: Snowboarding

Blanka Isielonis (born 22 May 1978) is a Polish snowboarder. She competed in the women's parallel giant slalom event at the 2006 Winter Olympics.
