= Pan Lei (snowboarder) =

Chinese snowboarder

Personal information
- Nationality: Chinese
- Born: 26 October 1988 (age 36)

Sport
- Sport: Snowboarding

Pan Lei (born 26 October 1988) is a Chinese snowboarder. She competed in the women's halfpipe event at the 2006 Winter Olympics.
