= Snowboarding at the 2017 Winter Universiade =

Snowboarding at the XXVIII Winter Universiade
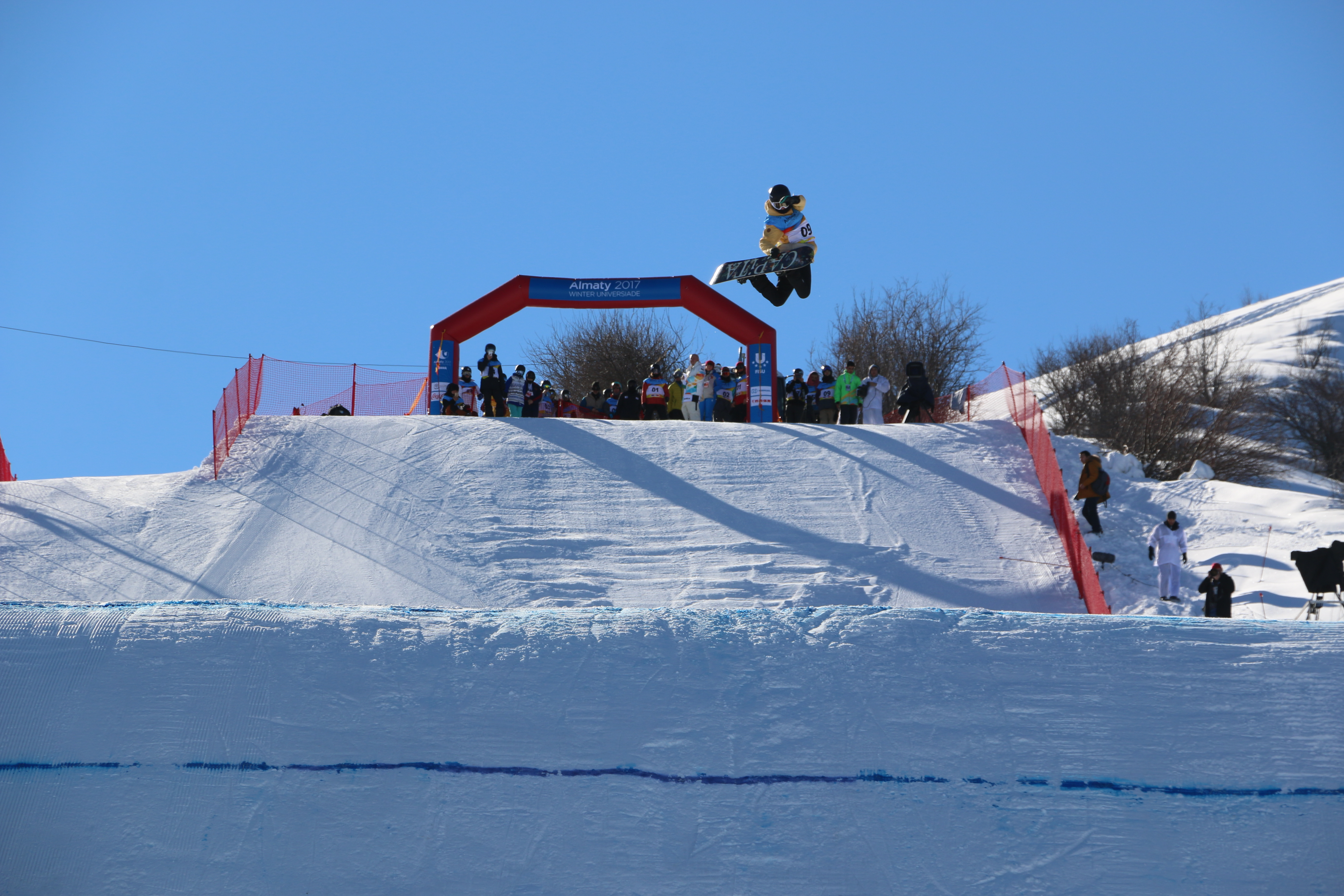
- Venue: Shymbulak Ski Resort
- Dates: 30 January – 7 February 2017

Snowboarding at the 2017 Winter Universiade was held at the Shymbulak Ski Resort from 30 January to 7 February 2017.

== Men's events ==
Event	Gold		Silver		Bronze	
Big air	(Russia) Mikhail Matveev	94.75	(Australia) Joss McAlpin	88.25	(Czech Republic) Martin Mikyska	87.75
Slopestyle	(Russia) Mikhail Matveev	94.50	(Finland) Aleksi Partanen	90.25	(Czech Republic) Martin Mikyska	87.75
Parallel slalom	(Russia) Bogdan Bogdanov		(Poland) Oskar Kwiatkowski		(Ukraine) Oleksandr Belinskyy	
Parallel giant slalom	(Russia) Bogdan Bogdanov		(Russia) Vladislav Shkurikhin		(Ukraine) Oleksandr Belinskyy	
Snowboard cross	(France) Léo Le Blé		(France) Guilhem Apilli		(Switzerland) Sandro Perrenoud	

== Women's events ==
Event	Gold		Silver		Bronze	
Big Air	(Russia) Anastasiia Loginova	85.25	(Russia) Elena Kostenko	83.75	(Poland) Katarzyna Rusin	81.25
Slopestyle	(Poland) Katarzyna Rusin	82.25	(Australia) Amber Arazny	75.00	(Russia) Anastasiia Loginova	70.50
Parallel slalom	(Poland) Weronika Biela		(United States) Maggie Carrigan		(Poland) Karolina Sztokfisz	
Parallel giant slalom	(Poland) Aleksandra Król		(Ukraine) Annamari Dancha		(Poland) Karolina Sztokfisz	
Snowboard cross	(France) Sarah Devouassoux		(Switzerland) Miriam Wuffli		(Czech Republic) Kateřina Chourová	
