= Dmitry Sarsembaev =

Russian snowboarder (born 1997)

Personal information
- Born: 29 November 1997 (age 28) Tashtagol, Russia

Sport
- Country: Russia
- Sport: Snowboarding
Medal record
Representing Russia
Winter Universiade
| Gold medal – first place | 2019 Krasnoyarsk | Parallel slalom |
| Bronze medal – third place | 2019 Krasnoyarsk | Parallel GS |

Dmitry Vitalyevich Sarsembayev (Russian: Дмитрий Витальевич Сарсембаев) (born 29 November 1997) is a Russian snowboarder.

He competed in the 2017 FIS Snowboard World Championships, and in the 2018 Winter Olympics, in parallel giant slalom.
