= Sébastien Beaulieu =

Canadian snowboarder

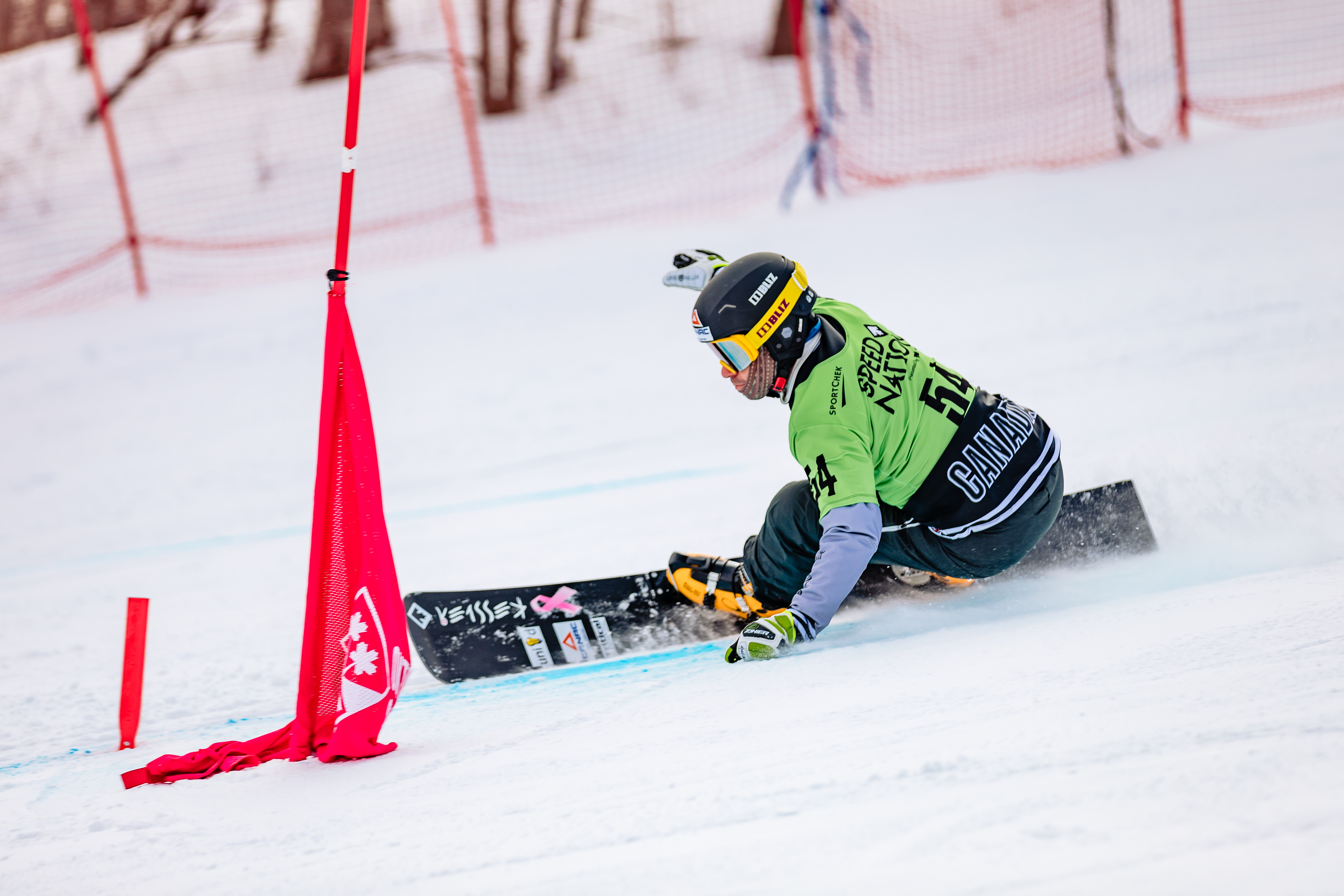
- Beaulieu in 2019

Personal information
- Born: 4 January 1991 (age 35) Quebec City, Quebec, Canada

Sport
- Country: Canada
- Sport: Snowboarding
- Events: Parallel giant slalom, Parallel slalom

Sébastien Beaulieu (born 4 January 1991) is a Canadian snowboarder who competes internationally in the alpine snowboard discipline.

== Career ==
Beaulieu has competed at three Senior World Championships in 2017, 2019 and 2021. Beaulieu's best performances came in 2019 and 2021, where he finished 27th in the parallel giant slalom event each time.

In January 2022, Beaulieu was initially not named to Canada's 2022 Olympic team. However, after an appeal process Beaulieu along with three other snowboarders were added to the team in the parallel giant slalom event.
