= Rubén Verges =

Spanish snowboarder

Personal information
- Nationality: Spanish
- Born: March 11, 1987 (age 38)

Sport
- Sport: Snowboarding

Rubén Verges (born 11 March 1987 in Barcelona) is a Spanish snowboarder. He placed 31st in the men's halfpipe event at the 2010 Winter Olympics.
