= Oleksandr Belinskyy =

Ukrainian snowboarder

Personal information
- Full name: Олександр Валерійович Белінський
- Born: 27 March 1995 (age 31) Kyiv, Ukraine

Sport
- Sport: Skiing
Medal record
Men's snowboarding
Representing Ukraine
Winter Universiade
Bronze medal – third place	2017 Almaty	Parallel slalom
Bronze medal – third place	2017 Almaty	Parallel giant slalom
World Junior Championships
Silver medal – second place	2013 Erzurum	Parallel giant slalom
- Updated on 24 February 2024

Oleksandr Valeriyovych Belinskyy (Ukrainian: Олександр Валерійович Белінський; born 27 March 1995 in Kyiv) is a Ukrainian snowboarder, specializing in Alpine snowboarding. He's twice 2017 Winter Universiade bronze medalist in parallel slalom and parallel giant slalom events.

== Career ==
He debuted competing in international competitions at the 2012 World Junior Snowboarding Championships, held in Sierra Nevada, in parallel giant slalom event, but he didn't receive a medal (6th place).

At the 2013 World Junior Snowboarding Championships, held in Erzurum, Oleksandr won a silver medal in parallel giant slalom event.

The following years, Oleksandr won a bronze medal in parallel giant slalom event at the 2017 Winter Universiade in Almaty. Later, he received a second bronze medal in parallel slalom event at this Winter Universiade, becoming twice bronze medalist.
