= Lukas Mathies =

Austrian snowboarder (born 1991)

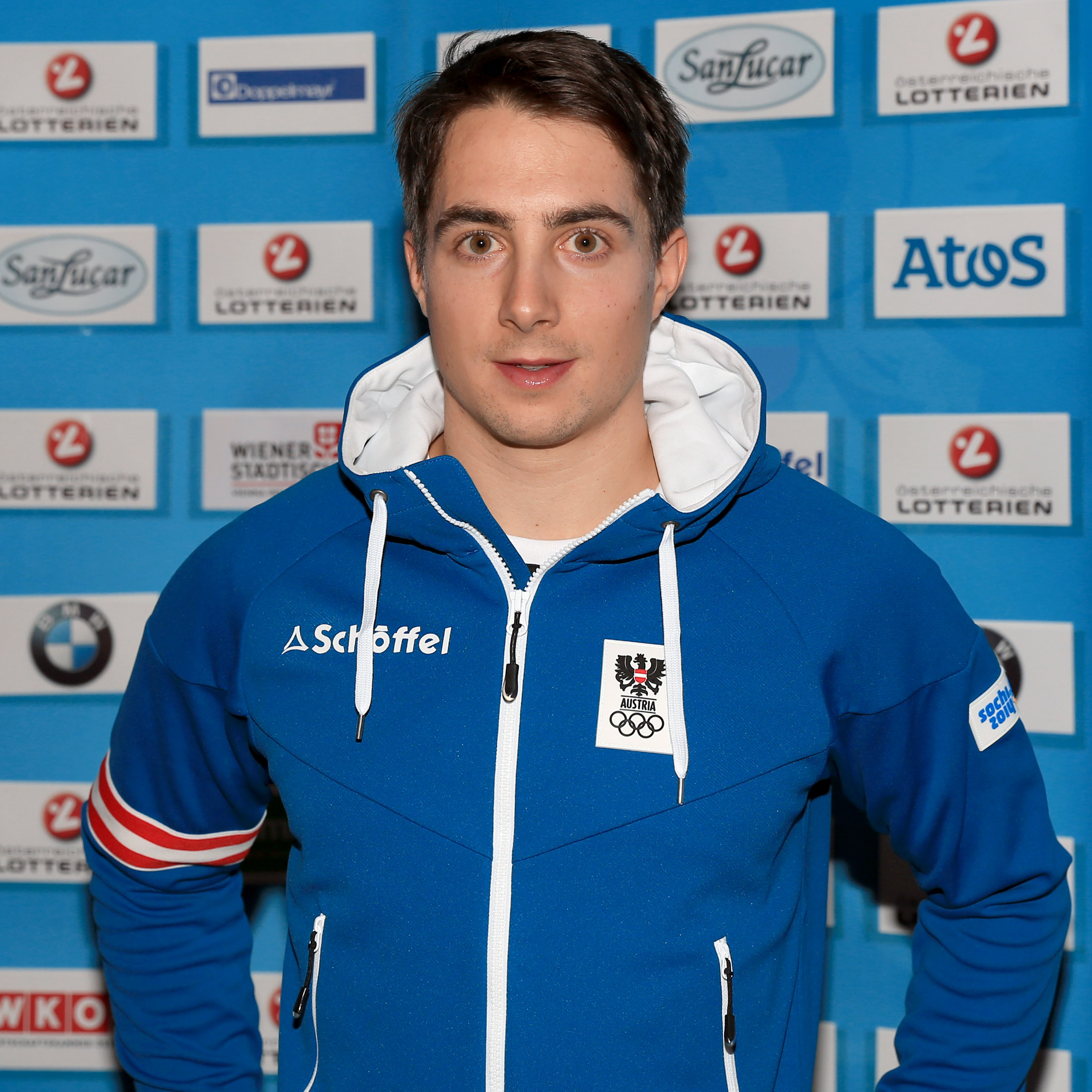
- Mathies in 2014

Personal information
- Born: 15 March 1991 (age 35) Schruns, Austria
- Height: 1.71 m (5 ft 7 in)
- Weight: 70 kg (154 lb)

Sport
- Country: Austria
- Sport: Snowboarding
- Event: Alpine
- Club: WSV St. Gallenkirch
- Coached by: Tom Weninger

Lukas Mathies (born 15 March 1991 in Schruns) is an Austrian alpine snowboarder. He represented his nation Austria at the 2014 Winter Olympics, and also became a double medalist, gold and silver, in alpine snowboarding at the 2011 FIS Junior World Championships in Chiesa in Valmalenco, Italy. Mathies currently trains for the Austrian team and for his original club WSV Sankt Gallenkirch, under his personal coach and mentor Tom Weninger.

Mathies qualified for two alpine snowboarding events (including the first-ever men's parallel slalom) at the 2014 Winter Olympics in Sochi by achieving top three finishes from the FIS World Cup series in Rogla, Slovenia and in Carezza, Italy. In the men's giant slalom, Mathies was disqualified from the tournament after missing a gate on his first seeding run. Three days later, in the men's slalom, Mathies recorded a total time of 58.93 to grab a third spot in the seeding round but fell short behind Italy's Aaron March in the quarterfinal race by 29-hundredths of a second.

Mathies also competed for Austria at the 2022 Winter Olympics.
