= Carla Somaini =

Swiss snowboarder (born 1991)

Personal information
- Born: 13 October 1991 (age 33)

Sport
- Country: Switzerland
- Sport: Snowboarding
- Event(s): Slopestyle, Big air

Carla Somaini (born 13 October 1991) is a Swiss snowboarder who competes internationally.

She represented Switzerland at the 2018 Winter Olympics.
