= Sebastian Kislinger =

Austrian snowboarder

Personal information
- Born: 1 August 1988 (age 38)

Sport
- Country: Austria
- Sport: Snowboarding

Sebastian Kislinger (born 1 August 1988) is an Austrian snowboarder.

He competed in the 2015 and 2017 FIS Snowboard World Championships, and in the 2018 Winter Olympics, in parallel giant slalom.
