= FIS Freestyle Ski and Snowboarding World Championships 2021 – Women's snowboard cross =

Women's snowboard cross at the FIS Freestyle Ski and Snowboarding World Championships 2021
- Location: Idre, Sweden
- Dates: 9 February (qualification); 11 February
- Competitors: 25 from 11 nations

Medalists
gold medal	Charlotte Bankes	Great Britain
silver medal	Michela Moioli	Italy
bronze medal	Eva Samková	Czech Republic

The Women's snowboard cross competition at the FIS Freestyle Ski and Snowboarding World Championships 2021 was held on 11 February 2021. A qualification was held on 9 February.

== Qualification ==
The qualification was held on 9 February at 11:45.

Rank	Bib	Name	Country	Run 1	Rank	Run 2	Rank	Best	Notes
1	12	Charlotte Bankes	Great Britain	1:21.93	1			1:21.93	Q
2	3	Faye Gulini	United States	1:22.93	2			1:22.93	Q
3	8	Eva Samková	Czech Republic	1:23.21	3			1:23.21	Q
4	18	Meryeta O'Dine	Canada	1:23.42	4			1:23.42	Q
5	6	Michela Moioli	Italy	1:23.55	5			1:23.55	Q
6	14	Lindsey Jacobellis	United States	1:24.00	6			1:24.00	Q
7	2	Belle Brockhoff	Australia	1:24.09	7			1:24.09	Q
8	9	Raffaella Brutto	Italy	1:24.99	8			1:24.99	Q
9	5	Chloé Trespeuch	France	1:25.81	11	1:24.59	1	1:24.59	q
10	24	Kristina Paul	Russian Ski Federation	1:25.22	9	1:26.25	5	1:25.22	q
11	15	Stacy Gaskill	United States	1:25.27	10	1:25.25	2	1:25.25	q
12	13	Lara Casanova	Switzerland	1:26.75	15	1:25.54	3	1:25.54	q
13	23	Alexia Queyrel	France	1:25.88	12	Did not finish		1:25.88	q
14	1	Sofia Belingheri	Italy	1:28.08	20	1:26.13	4	1:26.13	q
15	27	Meghan Tierney	United States	1:26.14	13	1:26.64	6	1:26.14	q
16	22	Jana Fischer	Germany	1:26.23	14	1:27.60	9	1:26.23	q
17	28	Mariya Vasiltsova	Russian Ski Federation	1:26.83	16	Did not finish		1:26.83	
18	7	Julia Pereira de Sousa Mabileau	France	1:29.05	22	1:27.10	7	1:27.10	
19	21	Aline Albrecht	Switzerland	1:27.55	17	1:28.14	12	1:27.55	
20	17	Sophie Hediger	Switzerland	1:45.73	24	1:27.59	8	1:27.59	
21	10	Zoe Bergermann	Canada	1:27.80	18	1:27.61	10	1:27.61	
22	26	Yulia Lapteva	Russian Ski Federation	1:27.80	18	1:28.86	15	1:27.80	
23	4	Manon Petit-Lenoir	France	1:30.05	23	1:28.06	11	1:28.06	
24	11	Pia Zerkhold	Austria	Did not finish		1:28.63	13	1:28.63	
25	25	Aleksandra Parshina	Russian Ski Federation	1:28.64	21	1:28.71	14	1:28.64	
	16	Francesca Gallina	Italy	Did not start					
	19	Yuka Nakamura	Japan	Did not start					
	20	Vendula Hopjáková	Czech Republic	Did not start					

== Elimination round ==
=== Quarterfinals ===
Heat 1

Rank	Bib	Name	Country	Notes
1	1	Charlotte Bankes	Great Britain	Q
2	9	Chloé Trespeuch	France	Q
3	8	Raffaella Brutto	Italy	
4	16	Jana Fischer	Germany	

Heat 3

Rank	Bib	Name	Country	Notes
1	3	Eva Samková	Czech Republic	Q
2	11	Stacy Gaskill	United States	Q
3	6	Lindsey Jacobellis	United States	
	14	Sofia Belingheri	Italy	DNF

Heat 2

Rank	Bib	Name	Country	Notes
1	5	Michela Moioli	Italy	Q
2	12	Lara Casanova	Switzerland	Q
3	13	Alexia Queyrel	France	
4	4	Meryeta O'Dine	Canada	

Heat 4

Rank	Bib	Name	Country	Notes
1	7	Belle Brockhoff	Australia	Q
2	10	Kristina Paul	Russian Ski Federation	Q
3	15	Meghan Tierney	United States	
4	2	Faye Gulini	United States	

=== Semifinals ===
Heat 1

Rank	Bib	Name	Country	Notes
1	1	Charlotte Bankes	Great Britain	Q
2	5	Michela Moioli	Italy	Q
3	9	Chloé Trespeuch	France	
4	12	Lara Casanova	Switzerland	

Heat 2

Rank	Bib	Name	Country	Notes
1	3	Eva Samková	Czech Republic	Q
2	7	Belle Brockhoff	Australia	Q
3	11	Stacy Gaskill	United States	
4	10	Kristina Paul	Russian Ski Federation	

=== Finals ===
==== Small final ====
Rank	Bib	Name	Country	Notes
5	12	Lara Casanova	Switzerland	
6	11	Stacy Gaskill	United States	
7	9	Chloé Trespeuch	France	
8	10	Kristina Paul	Russian Ski Federation	

==== Big final ====
Rank	Bib	Name	Country	Notes
1st place, gold medalist(s)	1	Charlotte Bankes	Great Britain	
2nd place, silver medalist(s)	5	Michela Moioli	Italy	
3rd place, bronze medalist(s)	3	Eva Samková	Czech Republic	
4	7	Belle Brockhoff	Australia	
