= FIS Freestyle Ski and Snowboarding World Championships 2019 – Women's snowboard cross =

Women's snowboard cross at the FIS Freestyle Ski and Snowboarding World Championships 2019
- Venue: Solitude Mountain Resort
- Location: Utah, United States
- Dates: January 31 – February 1
- Competitors: 27 from 10 nations

Medalists
gold medal	Eva Samková	Czech Republic
silver medal	Charlotte Bankes	Great Britain
bronze medal	Michela Moioli	Italy

The Women's snowboard cross competition at the FIS Freestyle Ski and Snowboarding World Championships 2019 was held on January 31 and February 1, 2019.

== Qualification ==
The qualification was started on January 31, at 12:20.

Rank	Bib	Name	Country	Run 1	Rank	Run 2	Rank	Best	Notes
1	13	Eva Samková	Czech Republic	1:08.71	1			1:08.71	Q
2	9	Nelly Moenne-Loccoz	France	1:09.33	2			1:09.33	Q
3	16	Charlotte Bankes	Great Britain	1:09.90	3			1:09.90	Q
4	6	Michela Moioli	Italy	1:10.06	4			1:10.06	Q
5	2	Lindsey Jacobellis	United States	1:10.07	5			1:10.07	Q
6	14	Chloé Trespeuch	France	1:10.86	6			1:10.86	Q
7	7	Francesca Gallina	Italy	1:10.90	7			1:10.90	Q
8	4	Meryeta O'Dine	Canada	1:11.02	8			1:11.02	Q
9	3	Raffaella Brutto	Italy	1:11.06	10	1:10.80	1	1:10.80	q
10	17	Kristina Paul	Russia	1:12.36	16	1:10.93	2	1:10.93	q
11	11	Lara Casanova	Switzerland	1:11.03	9	1:11.95	8	1:11.03	q
12	15	Julia Pereira de Sousa Mabileau	France	1:12.03	15	1:11.23	3	1:11.23	q
13	12	Sina Siegenthaler	Switzerland	1:11.31	11	DNF		1:11.31	q
14	5	Sofia Belingheri	Italy	1:11.86	13	1:11.37	4	1:11.37	q
15	8	Carle Brenneman	Canada	1:11.73	12	1:11.47	5	1:11.47	q
16	10	Hanna Ihedioha	Germany	1:19.70	26	1:11.49	6	1:11.49	q
17	19	Jana Fischer	Germany	1:12.71	17	1:11.82	7	1:11.82	
18	1	Manon Petit-Lenoir	France	1:11.91	14	1:12.25	9	1:11.91	
19	20	Muriel Jost	Switzerland	1:12.81	18	1:12.76	10	1:12.76	
20	22	Yulia Lapteva	Russia	1:12.84	19	1:13.72	13	1:12.84	
21	23	Mariya Vasiltsova	Russia	1:14.39	23	1:13.34	11	1:13.34	
22	26	Stacy Gaskill	United States	1:14.94	24	1:13.53	12	1:13.53	
23	21	Zuzanna Smykała	Poland	1:14.39	22	1:13.73	14	1:13.73	
24	18	Meghan Tierney	United States	1:13.77	20	1:13.82	15	1:13.77	
25	25	Livia Molodyh	United States	1:14.04	21	1:15.87	18	1:14.04	
26	24	Anna Miller	United States	1:15.22	25	1:15.28	16	1:15.22	
27	27	Vendula Hopjáková	Czech Republic	1:25.31	27	1:15.77	17	1:15.77	

== Elimination round ==
The top 16 qualifiers advanced to the quarterfinals. From here, they participated in four-person elimination races, with the top two from each race advancing.

=== Quarterfinals ===
Heat 1

Rank	Bib	Name	Country	Notes
1	1	Eva Samková	Czech Republic	Q
2	9	Raffaella Brutto	Italy	Q
3	16	Hanna Ihedioha	Germany	
4	8	Meryeta O'Dine	Canada	

Heat 3

Rank	Bib	Name	Country	Notes
1	6	Chloé Trespeuch	France	Q
2	3	Charlotte Bankes	Great Britain	Q
3	11	Lara Casanova	Switzerland	
4	14	Sofia Belingheri	Italy	

Heat 2

Rank	Bib	Name	Country	Notes
1	4	Michela Moioli	Italy	Q
2	5	Lindsey Jacobellis	United States	Q
3	12	Julia Pereira de Sousa Mabileau	France	
	13	Sina Siegenthaler	Switzerland	DNS

Heat 4

Rank	Bib	Name	Country	Notes
1	7	Francesca Gallina	Italy	Q
2	15	Carle Brenneman	Canada	Q
3	2	Nelly Moenne-Loccoz	France	
	10	Kristina Paul	Russia	DNF

=== Semifinals ===
Heat 1

Rank	Bib	Name	Country	Notes
1	1	Eva Samková	Czech Republic	Q
2	4	Michela Moioli	Italy	Q
3	5	Lindsey Jacobellis	United States	
4	9	Raffaella Brutto	Italy	

Heat 2

Rank	Bib	Name	Country	Notes
1	3	Charlotte Bankes	Great Britain	Q
2	7	Francesca Gallina	Italy	Q
3	6	Chloé Trespeuch	France	
4	15	Carle Brenneman	Canada	

=== Finals ===
==== Small final ====
Rank	Bib	Name	Country	Notes
5	5	Lindsey Jacobellis	United States	
6	9	Raffaella Brutto	Italy	
7	6	Chloé Trespeuch	France	
8	15	Carle Brenneman	Canada	

==== Big final ====
Rank	Bib	Name	Country	Notes
1st place, gold medalist(s)	1	Eva Samková	Czech Republic	
2nd place, silver medalist(s)	3	Charlotte Bankes	Great Britain	
3rd place, bronze medalist(s)	4	Michela Moioli	Italy	
4	7	Francesca Gallina	Italy	
