= FIS Freestyle Ski and Snowboarding World Championships 2023 – Mixed snowboard team cross =

Mixed snowboard team cross at the FIS Freestyle Ski and Snowboarding World Championships 2023
- Location: Bakuriani, Georgia
- Dates: 2 March
- Competitors: 32 from 14 nations
- Teams: 16

Medalists
gold medal	Huw Nightingale; Charlotte Bankes	Great Britain
silver medal	Jakob Dusek; Pia Zerkhold	Austria
bronze medal	Merlin Surget; Chloé Trespeuch	France

The Mixed snowboard team cross competition at the FIS Freestyle Ski and Snowboarding World Championships 2023 was held on 2 March 2023.

== Elimination round ==
Four-team elimination races were held, with the top two from each race advancing.

=== Quarterfinals ===
Heat 1

Rank	Bib	Country	Athletes	Notes
1	1	France 1	Merlin Surget; Chloé Trespeuch	Q
2	9	United States 2	Senna Leith; Faye Gulini	Q
3	16	China 1	Ye Kangjja; Yongqinglamu	
4	8	Italy 1	Omar Visintin; Raffaella Brutto	

Heat 3

Rank	Bib	Country	Athletes	Notes
1	14	Great Britain 1	Huw Nightingale; Charlotte Bankes	Q
2	3	France 2	Loan Bozzolo; Manon Petit-Lenoir	Q
3	6	Germany 1	Martin Nörl; Jana Fischer	
4	11	Czech Republic 1	Radek Houser; Eva Adamczyková	

Heat 2

Rank	Bib	Country	Athletes	Notes
1	5	Canada 1	Éliot Grondin; Audrey McManiman	Q
2	4	Austria 1	Jakob Dusek; Pia Zerkhold	Q
3	13	Japan 1	Yoshiki Takahara; Runa Suzuki	
4	12	Netherlands 1	Glenn de Blois; Nienke Poll	

Heat 4

Rank	Bib	Country	Athletes	Notes
1	10	Switzerland 1	Kalle Koblet; Lara Casanova	Q
2	7	United States 1	Nick Baumgartner; Lindsey Jacobellis	Q
3	2	Australia 1	Cameron Bolton; Josie Baff	
4	15	South Korea 1	Woo Jin; Woo Su-been	

=== Semifinals ===
Heat 1

Rank	Bib	Country	Athletes	Notes
1	4	Austria 1	Jakob Dusek; Pia Zerkhold	Q
2	1	France 1	Merlin Surget; Chloé Trespeuch	Q
3	9	United States 2	Senna Leith; Faye Gulini	
4	5	Canada 1	Éliot Grondin; Audrey McManiman	

Heat 2

Rank	Bib	Country	Athletes	Notes
1	14	Great Britain 1	Huw Nightingale; Charlotte Bankes	Q
2	7	United States 1	Nick Baumgartner; Lindsey Jacobellis	Q
3	10	Switzerland 1	Kalle Koblet; Lara Casanova	
4	3	France 2	Loan Bozzolo; Manon Petit-Lenoir	

=== Finals ===
==== Small final ====
Rank	Bib	Country	Athletes	Notes
5	5	Canada 1	Éliot Grondin; Audrey McManiman	
6	10	Switzerland 1	Kalle Koblet; Lara Casanova	
7	9	United States 2	Senna Leith; Faye Gulini	
8	3	France 2	Loan Bozzolo; Manon Petit-Lenoir	

==== Big final ====
Rank	Bib	Country	Athletes	Notes
1st place, gold medalist(s)	14	Great Britain 1	Huw Nightingale; Charlotte Bankes	
2nd place, silver medalist(s)	4	Austria 1	Jakob Dusek; Pia Zerkhold	
3rd place, bronze medalist(s)	1	France 1	Merlin Surget; Chloé Trespeuch	
4	7	United States 1	Nick Baumgartner; Lindsey Jacobellis	
