= Snowboarding at the 2026 Winter Olympics – Mixed team snowboard cross =

Mixed team snowboard cross at the XXV Olympic Winter Games
- Snowboarding
- Venue: Livigno Snow Park, Valtellina
- Date: 15 February

Medalists
1st place, gold medalist(s)		Huw Nightingale; Charlotte Bankes	Great Britain
2nd place, silver medalist(s)		Lorenzo Sommariva; Michela Moioli	Italy
3rd place, bronze medalist(s)		Loan Bozzolo; Léa Casta	France

The mixed team snowboard cross competition in snowboarding at the 2026 Winter Olympics was held on 15 February, at the Livigno Snow Park in Valtellina. Huw Nightingale and Charlotte Bankes of Great Britain won the event. Lorenzo Sommariva and Michela Moioli were second, and Loan Bozzolo and Léa Casta of France were third. All of them, except for Moioli, got their first Olympic medals.

== Background ==
The 2022 champions were Nick Baumgartner and Lindsey Jacobellis. Jacobellis retired from competitions, and Baumgartner was competing in 2026 with Faye Thelen. The 2022 silver medalists, Omar Visintin and Michela Moioli, were competing with other partners. The bronze medalists were Éliot Grondin and Meryeta O'Dine; O'Dine missed the Olympics due to an injury, and Grondin was competing with Audrey McManiman. Huw Nightingale and Charlotte Bankes won the only mixed team cross event in the 2025–26 FIS Snowboard World Cup prior to the Olympics. The 2025 World champion were Ryan Regez and Fanny Smith.

== Results ==
=== Quarterfinals ===
Q — Qualified for the semifinals
Heat 1

Rank	Bib	Country	Athletes	Notes
1	1	France 2	Loan Bozzolo; Léa Casta	Q
2	9	Switzerland 1	Kalle Koblet; Noémie Wiedmer	Q
3	16	Italy 2	Omar Visintin; Sofia Groblechner	
4	8	United States 2	Nathan Pare; Stacy Gaskill	

Heat 2

Rank	Bib	Country	Athletes	Notes
1	13	Great Britain 1	Huw Nightingale; Charlotte Bankes	Q
2	12	Australia 2	Jarryd Hughes; Mia Clift	Q
3	4	Austria 1	Jakob Dusek; Pia Zerkhold	
4	5	Canada 1	Éliot Grondin; Audrey McManiman	

Heat 3

Rank	Bib	Country	Athletes	Notes
1	6	Italy 1	Lorenzo Sommariva; Michela Moioli	Q
2	3	France 1	Aidan Chollet; Julia Nirani-Pereira	Q
3	11	Czech Republic 1	Krystof Choura; Eva Adamczyková	
4	14	United States 1	Nick Baumgartner; Faye Thelen	

Heat 4

Rank	Bib	Country	Athletes	Notes
1	2	Australia 1	Adam Lambert; Josie Baff	Q
2	7	Germany 1	Leon Ulbricht; Jana Fischer	Q
3	10	France 3	Jonas Chollet; Chloé Trespeuch	
4	15	Czech Republic 2	Radek Houser; Karolína Hrůšová	

==== Semifinals ====
Heat 1

Rank	Bib	Country	Athletes	Notes
1	13	Great Britain 1	Huw Nightingale; Charlotte Bankes	Q
2	1	France 2	Loan Bozzolo; Léa Casta	Q
3	12	Australia 2	Jarryd Hughes; Mia Clift	
4	9	Switzerland 1	Kalle Koblet; Noémie Wiedmer	

Heat 2

Rank	Bib	Country	Athletes	Notes
1	6	Italy 1	Lorenzo Sommariva; Michela Moioli	Q
2	2	Australia 1	Adam Lambert; Josie Baff	Q
3	7	Germany 1	Leon Ulbricht; Jana Fischer	
4	3	France 1	Aidan Chollet; Julia Nirani-Pereira	

==== Finals ====
Small final

Rank	Bib	Country	Athletes	Notes
5	3	France 1	Aidan Chollet; Julia Nirani-Pereira	
6	9	Switzerland 1	Kalle Koblet; Noémie Wiedmer	
7	7	Germany 1	Leon Ulbricht; Jana Fischer	
8	12	Australia 2	Jarryd Hughes; Mia Clift	

Big final

Rank	Bib	Country	Athletes	Notes
1st place, gold medalist(s)	13	Great Britain 1	Huw Nightingale; Charlotte Bankes	
2nd place, silver medalist(s)	6	Italy 1	Lorenzo Sommariva; Michela Moioli	
3rd place, bronze medalist(s)	1	France 2	Loan Bozzolo; Léa Casta	
4	2	Australia 1	Adam Lambert; Josie Baff	
