= Charlotte Bankes =

British snowboarder (born 1995)

Personal information
- Full name: Charlotte Anne Bankes
- Nationality: British
- Born: 10 June 1995 (age 31) Hemel Hempstead, Hertfordshire, England
- Height: 163 cm (5 ft 4 in)
- Weight: 60 kg (132 lb)

Sport
- Country: Great Britain
- Sport: Snowboarding
- Event: Snowboard cross
Medal record
Women's snowboarding
Representing Great Britain
Olympic Games
Gold medal – first place	2026 Milano Cortina	Mixed team snowboard cross
World Championships
Gold medal – first place	2021 Idre	Snowboard cross
Gold medal – first place	2023 Bakuriani	Mixed team snowboard cross
Silver medal – second place	2019 Utah	Snowboard cross
Silver medal – second place	2025 Engadin	Snowboard cross
Representing France
World Championships
Silver medal – second place	2017 Sierra Nevada	Team snowboard cross

Charlotte Anne Bankes (born 10 June 1995) is a British snowboarder who competes in the snowboard cross. In 2021, she became the first ever Briton to be a snowboarding world champion. At the 2026 Winter Olympics, she won a gold medal in the mixed team event with Huw Nightingale—Great Britain's first ever Olympic gold medal in a snow sport. Bankes has 28 career World Cup race victories and has won the Crystal Globe trophy on three occasions.

Born in England, Bankes moved with her family to France at the age of four. She began competing internationally for France at the age of 15, won three National Championships, and represented them at both the 2014 and 2018 Winter Olympics. In search of a fresh start following a serious injury and a seventh-place finish at the 2018 Games, Bankes switched allegiance to Great Britain. She won a silver medal in the 2019 World Championships, before becoming the snowboard cross world champion for the first time in 2021. She won back-to-back World Cup titles in 2021–22 and 2022–23 and became a world champion with Nightingale in the mixed team event at the 2023 World Championships. At the 2026 Winter Olympics, Bankes and Nightingale won gold in the mixed team snowboard cross. She then won the 2025–26 World Cup title to secure her third Crystal Globe.

== Career ==
=== 1995–2018: Early life and competing for France ===
Charlotte Anne Bankes was born on 10 June 1995 in Hemel Hempstead, England. She moved with her family to Puy-Saint-Vincent, France, in the southern Alps in 1999 when she was four years old. Her father was a lawyer, her mother a biochemist, and the family wanted to leave suburban living. She had already started skiing by this time, having first tried it at age two, but took up snowboarding after watching her brothers William and Thomas, who also went on to compete at international level. While growing up, she had the opportunity to train on the slopes most days. Bankes started competing internationally for France in 2010 at the age of 15. The following year, she sustained a pelvic fracture in a crash, which left her in "constant pain" and unable to train at full intensity for several years.

Bankes was the French national snowboard cross champion for the first time in 2013, and the following year, made her FIS Snowboard World Cup debut before representing France at the 2014 Winter Olympics in Sochi. At the Games, she finished in 17th position, and later described the experience as "a struggle". She won a gold medal at the 2014–15 World Cup race in La Molina, and became the French national champion for the second time in 2015. In the 2016–17 World Cup, she triumphed at the race in Veysonnaz. That season, Bankes and French teammate Manon Petit won a bronze medal in the World Cup women's team race in Montafon and a silver in the women's team event at the 2017 World Championships. In 2018, Bankes won her third National Championships title and competed at the Winter Olympics in Pyeongchang. She fell during the semi-finals, before winning the small final, to finish in seventh place overall. In the 2017–18 World Cup, Bankes won a gold medal in Bansko, as well as a silver medal in Feldberg and a bronze in La Molina.

After the 2018 Games, Bankes switched from representing France to competing for Great Britain, partly due to frustration from her struggles to fully recover from her pelvic injury. Explaining her switch, Bankes stated that she could no longer continue with the French team, and it was a case of "either switch or stop snowboarding." She also explained that although she had been "part of the team", she felt she had been competing for herself and her home region rather than for France. She spoke to GB Snowsport who helped convince her to switch as she was impressed with the strategy that they had set out for her. French newspaper Le Dauphiné libéré called the news a 'blow', with Bankes the second competitor to have recently switched from French allegiance. Kevin Strucl, coach for the French team, called it "a big loss", but accepted her decision to switch, suggesting it would have been counterproductive to keep an athlete in the group that did not want to be there. She then spent the summer undergoing extensive injury rehabilitation in London.

=== 2018–2022: Competing for Great Britain ===
In November 2018, Bankes won her first competition for Great Britain in a Europa Cup event in Austria. The following month, she achieved her first World Cup podium finish for Great Britain at a race in Cervinia, where she narrowly finished ahead of her former French team-mate Nelly Moenne-Loccoz to secure third place. In January 2019, Bankes stated that she was able to "train properly" again following her previous pelvic injury. The following month, she participated at the 2019 World Championships, winning a silver medal behind Czech racer Eva Samková in the snowboard cross. Her medal was the first one ever won by a British snowboarder at a World Championships.

Two years later, she went one better at the 2021 World Championships in Sweden when she secured a gold medal in the snowboard cross. She finished 0.08 seconds ahead of second-placed Michela Moioli of Italy to become a world champion for the first time. Her victory was also the first ever by a British snowboarder at a FIS Snowboard World Championships. In the 2020–21 World Cup, Bankes triumphed in Bakuriani to claim her first victory in a World Cup race since 2018.

In the 2021–22 World Cup season, Bankes claimed snowboard cross titles in Montafon, Krasnoyarsk (x2), Reiteralm and Veysonnaz. Her victory in Reiteralm gave her an unassailable 113-point advantage in the series, and she won the overall World Cup title and the accompanying Crystal Globe trophy for the first time. In the 2022 Winter Olympics, she was eliminated from the snowboard cross at the quarter-finals stage. She qualified for the quarter-finals with the second fastest time, but a tactical misjudgment in her next race left her out of position. She also competed in the mixed team event with Huw Nightingale, the pairing finished in sixth place.

=== 2022–present: Olympic mixed team champion ===
In the 2022–23 World Cup season, Bankes achieved victories at Cervinia, Cortina d'Ampezzo, Sierra Nevada (x2), Veysonnaz and Mont-Sainte-Anne. She finished the series as the overall champion and won her second Crystal Globe trophy, 73 points ahead of French runner-up Chloé Trespeuch. At the World Championships, she was unable to retain her individual world title, her defence ending following a crash in the first heat. In the team race, Bankes and Nightingale won Great Britain's first ever world title in the event. Nightingale finished his race 0.07 seconds behind the leader. Bankes then made up the deficit and ended her race 0.88 seconds ahead of the Austrians in second to claim the win.

Bankes again partnered with Nightingale to secure Great Britain's first ever mixed team World Cup triumph after securing victory in Les Deux Alpes. Bankes finished in overall second position for the individual snowboard cross in the 2023–24 World Cup. The beginning of her campaign was disrupted by crashes but she went on to secure victories in Gudauri, Sierra Nevada, Cortina d'Ampezzo and back-to-back events in Mont-Sainte-Anne. She finished the competition 35 points behind Trespeuch, unable to recover the potential points that she lost from her slow start in the series.

In the 2024–25 World Cup, Bankes achieved back-to-back victories in Beidahu, as well as securing wins in Cortina d'Ampezzo, Erzurum and Gudauri. With three races in the World Cup remaining, she held a 57-point advantage over second-placed French competitor Léa Casta in the overall standings. She then raced at the World Championships in Engadin and finished with a silver medal in the individual competition, where she was beaten in a photo finish by Moioli. In the mixed team competition, Bankes and Nightingale failed to progress past the quarter-finals stage. Her season was cut short the following month after she broke her collarbone in training. The injury left her unable to compete in the two remaining World Cup races of the season, and Casta went on to win the Crystal Globe trophy.

Bankes underwent two surgeries following her collarbone injury. In December 2025, she returned to competition in the World Cup, suffering a quarter-finals exit in the competition in Cervinia, before winning a gold medal alongside Nightingale in the mixed team event. The following month, she won a further gold medal at the World Cup event in Dongbeiya. Competing at her fourth Olympics, Bankes was eliminated at the quarter-finals stage of the women's snowboard cross at Livigno Snow Park in Italy. She finished ninth in the opening round, before progressing through her next heat, but a slow start cost her in the quarter-finals as she finished fourth with only the top two advancing to the semi-finals. A frustrated Bankes said she had found the track difficult all week.

Bankes then teamed up with Nightingale for the mixed team competition, with the duo winning all three of their races on their way to the gold medal. In the final, Nightingale finished his part of the race in second position, 0.14 seconds behind the French leader Loan Bozzolo. In the women's race that immediately followed, Bankes successfully made up the deficit and overtook Casta, eventually finishing 0.43 seconds ahead of second place. Their victory was the first ever gold medal for Great Britain in a snow sport. Afterwards, Bankes called their victory a "relief" and said she hoped that the gold medal would allow her to race with "less weight on [her] shoulders". Along with skeleton racer Matt Weston, Bankes was named as the flagbearer for Great Britain at the Games' closing ceremony.

In March, Bankes returned to the World Cup circuit with a quarter-finals exit in Erzurum before winning a second race at the venue two days later, when she beat Casta in a photo finish. Later that month, a third-place finish in Montafon coupled with a seventh-place finish for Casta moved Bankes to the top of the overall standings with one race remaining. At the final race of the series in Mont-Sainte-Anne, Bankes claimed her 28th career World Cup victory to win the series overall and secure the Crystal Globe trophy for a third time.

== Career results ==
=== Olympic medals ===
Year	Event	Teammate	Location	Position	Ref
2026	Mixed team snowboard cross	Huw Nightingale	(Italy) Livigno	1st	

=== World Championship medals ===
Year	Event	Location	Position	Ref
2017	Team snowboard cross	(Spain) Sierra Nevada	2nd	
2019	Snowboard cross	(United States) Solitude Mountain	2nd	
2021	Snowboard cross	(Sweden) Idre	1st	
2023	Mixed team snowboard cross	(Georgia (country)) Bakuriani	1st	
2025	Snowboard cross	(Switzerland) Engadin	2nd	

=== World Cup medals (women's snowboard cross) ===
Competition	Location	Position	Ref
Representing France
2014–15	(Spain) La Molina	1st	
2016–17	(Switzerland) Veysonnaz	1st	
2017–18	(Bulgaria) Bansko	1st	
2017–18	(Germany) Feldberg	2nd	
2017–18	(Spain) La Molina	3rd	
Representing Great Britain
2018–19	(Italy) Cervinia	3rd	
2020–21	(Georgia (country)) Bakuriani	1st	
2020–21	(Switzerland) Veysonnaz	3rd	
2021–22	(China) Secret Garden	2nd	
2021–22	(Austria) Montafon	1st	
2021–22	(Russia) Krasnoyarsk	1st	
2021–22	(Russia) Krasnoyarsk	1st	
2021–22	(Italy) Cortina d'Ampezzo	3rd	
2021–22	(Austria) Reiteralm	1st	
2021–22	(Switzerland) Veysonnaz	1st	
2022–23	(Italy) Cervinia	3rd	
2022–23	(Italy) Cervinia	1st	
2022–23	(Italy) Cortina d'Ampezzo	1st	
2022–23	(Spain) Sierra Nevada	1st	
2022–23	(Spain) Sierra Nevada	1st	
2022–23	(Switzerland) Veysonnaz	1st	
2022–23	(Canada) Mont-Sainte-Anne	1st	
2023–24	(Georgia (country)) Gudauri	1st	
2023–24	(Spain) Sierra Nevada	1st	
2023–24	(Spain) Sierra Nevada	3rd	
2023–24	(Italy) Cortina d'Ampezzo	1st	
2023–24	(Austria) Montafon	2nd	
2023–24	(Canada) Mont-Sainte-Anne	1st	
2023–24	(Canada) Mont-Sainte-Anne	1st	
2024–25	(China) Beidahu	1st	
2024–25	(China) Beidahu	1st	
2024–25	(Italy) Cortina d'Ampezzo	1st	
2024–25	(Turkey) Erzurum	1st	
2024–25	(Georgia (country)) Gudauri	1st	
2024–25	(Austria) Montafon	3rd	
2025–26	(China) Dongbeiya	1st	
2025–26	(China) Dongbeiya	3rd	
2025–26	(Turkey) Erzurum	1st	
2025–26	(Austria) Montafon	3rd	
2025–26	(Canada) Mont-Sainte-Anne	1st	
