= FIS Freestyle Ski and Snowboarding World Championships 2017 – Women's snowboard team cross =

The women's snowboard team cross competition of the FIS Freestyle Ski and Snowboarding World Championships 2017 was held at Sierra Nevada, Spain on March 13. 12 athletes from 5 countries competed.

== Elimination round ==
The following are the results of the elimination round.

=== Semifinals ===
Heat 1

Rank	Bib	Name	Country	Notes
1	1	Nelly Moenne Loccoz; Chloe Trespeuch	France	Q
2	3	Lindsey Jacobellis; Faye Gulini	United States	Q
DNS	6	Zoe Gillings-Brier; Maisie Potter	Great Britain	

Heat 2

Rank	Bib	Name	Country	Notes
1	2	Raffaella Brutto; Michela Moioli	Italy	Q
2	5	Manon Petit; Charlotte Bankes	France	Q
3	4	Eva Samkova; Vendula Hopjakova	Czech Republic	

=== Final ===
==== Big Final ====
Rank	Bib	Name	Country	Notes
1st place, gold medalist(s)	1	Nelly Moenne Loccoz; Chloe Trespeuch	France	
2nd place, silver medalist(s)	5	Manon Petit; Charlotte Bankes	France	
3rd place, bronze medalist(s)	3	Lindsey Jacobellis; Faye Gulini	United States	
4	2	Raffaella Brutto; Michela Moioli	Italy	
