= 2021–22 FIS Snowboard World Cup =

International snowboarding competition

Discipline	Men	Women
Parallel overall	(South Korea) Lee Sang-ho (1)	(Germany) Ramona Theresia Hofmeister (3)
Parallel slalom	(Austria) Andreas Prommegger (2)	(Switzerland) Julie Zogg (5)
Parallel giant slalom	(Germany) Stefan Baumeister (1)	(Germany) Ramona Theresia Hofmeister (3)
Snowboard cross	(Germany) Martin Nörl (1)	(United Kingdom) Charlotte Bankes (1)
Freestyle overall	(Norway) Mons Røisland (1)	(Japan) Kokomo Murase (1)
Halfpipe	(Japan) Ayumu Hirano (1)	(China) Cai Xuetong (7)
Slopestyle	(New Zealand) Tiarn Collins (1)	(Japan) Kokomo Murase (1)
Big Air	(Switzerland) Jonas Boesiger (1)	(Austria) Anna Gasser (3)
- Nations Cup Overall: Austria (3)

Competition
Locations	26 venues	26 venues
Individual	30 events	30 events
Team	3/5	3/5

The 2020–21 FIS Snowboard World Cup was the 28th World Cup season in snowboarding organised by International Ski Federation. The season started on 23 October 2021 and concluded on 27 March 2022. Competitions consisted of parallel slalom, parallel giant slalom, snowboard cross, halfpipe, slopestyle and big air.

On 1 March 2022, following the 2022 Russian invasion of Ukraine, FIS decided to exclude athletes from Russia and Belarus from FIS competitions, with an immediate effect.

== Men ==
=== Snowboard Cross ===
Season	Date	Place	Event	Winner	Second	Third
1	28 November 2021	(China) Beijing	SBX	(Austria) Alessandro Hämmerle	(Italy) Omar Visintin	(United States) Nick Baumgartner
2	10 December 2021	(Austria) Montafon	SBX	(Austria) Alessandro Hämmerle	(United States) Nick Baumgartner	(Germany) Umito Kirchwehm
3	18 December 2021	(Italy) Cervinia	SBX	(Austria) Jakob Dusek	(Canada) Éliot Grondin	(Spain) Lucas Eguibar
4	8 January 2022	(Russia) Krasnoyarsk	SBX	(Germany) Martin Nörl	(France) Merlin Surget	(Austria) Julian Lueftner
5	9 January 2022	(Russia) Krasnoyarsk	SBX	(Germany) Martin Nörl	(Austria) Jakob Dusek	(Canada) Éliot Grondin
	22 January 2022	(Italy) Chiesa in Valmalenco	SBX	Cancelled		
6	29 January 2022	(Italy) Cortina d'Ampezzo	SBX	(Germany) Martin Nörl	(Austria) Alessandro Hämmerle	(Australia) Cameron Bolton
	26 February 2022	(Canada) Mont Sainte-Anne	SBX	Cancelled		
7	12 March 2022	(Austria) Reiteralm	SBX	(Italy) Lorenzo Sommariva	(Austria) Jakob Dusek	(Switzerland) Kalle Koblet
8	20 March 2022	(Switzerland) Veysonnaz	SBX	(Canada) Éliot Grondin	(France) Merlin Surget	(France) Léo Le Blé Jaques

=== Parallel ===
Season	Date	Place	Event	Winner	Second	Third
1	11 December 2021	(Russia) Lake Bannoye	PGS	(South Korea) Lee Sang-ho	(Germany) Stefan Baumeister	(Russia) Andrey Sobolev
2	12 December 2021	(Russia) Lake Bannoye	PSL	(Austria) Andreas Prommegger	(South Korea) Lee Sang-ho	(Austria) Arvid Auner
3	16 December 2021	(Italy) Carezza	PGS	(Germany) Stefan Baumeister	(Russia) Dmitry Loginov	(Italy) Edwin Coratti
4	18 December 2021	(Italy) Cortina d'Ampezzo	PGS	(Switzerland) Dario Caviezel	(South Korea) Lee Sang-ho	(Italy) Roland Fischnaller
5	8 January 2022	(Switzerland) Scuol	PGS	(Russia) Dmitry Loginov	(Germany) Stefan Baumeister	(South Korea) Lee Sang-ho
6	11 January 2022	(Austria) Bad Gastein	PSL	(Austria) Arvid Auner	(Austria) Benjamin Karl	(Austria) Alexander Payer
7	14 January 2022	(Austria) Simonhöhe	PGS	(Germany) Stefan Baumeister	(Slovenia) Tim Mastnak	(Italy) Roland Fischnaller
	26 February 2022	(Russia) Moscow	GS	Cancelled		
8	12 March 2022	(Italy) Piancavallo	PSL	(Italy) Marc Hofer	(Italy) Edwin Coratti	(South Korea) Lee Sang-ho
9	16 March 2022	(Slovenia) Rogla	PGS	(Italy) Edwin Coratti	(Poland) Oskar Kwiatkowski	(Slovenia) Tim Mastnak
10	19 March 2022	(Germany) Berchtesgaden	PSL	(Italy) Edwin Coratti (Austria) Andreas Prommegger		(South Korea) Lee Sang-ho

=== Halfpipe ===
Season	Date	Place	Event	Winner	Second	Third
1	11 December 2021	(United States) Copper Mountain	HP	(Japan) Ruka Hirano	(Switzerland) Jan Scherrer	(Japan) Yūto Totsuka
2	8 January 2022	(United States) Mammoth	HP	(Japan) Ayumu Hirano	(Japan) Ruka Hirano	(Germany) André Höflich
3	15 January 2022	(Switzerland) Laax	HP	(Japan) Ayumu Hirano	(Switzerland) Jan Scherrer	(United States) Shaun White

=== Slopestyle ===
Season	Date	Place	Event	Winner	Second	Third
1	1 January 2022	(Canada) Calgary	SS	(Canada) Sébastien Toutant	(Norway) Mons Røisland	(United States) Luke Winkelmann
2	8 January 2022	(United States) Mammoth	SS	(United States) Red Gerard	(Netherlands) Niek van der Velden	(New Zealand) Tiarn Collins
3	15 January 2022	(Switzerland) Laax	SS	(United States) Sean Fitzsimons	(Norway) Ståle Sandbech	(United States) Jake Canter
4	6 March 2022	(Georgia (country)) Bakuriani	SS	(Germany) Leon Vockensperger	(Australia) Valentino Guseli	(Germany) Leon Gütl
5	19 March 2022	(Czech Republic) Špindlerův Mlýn	SS	(New Zealand) Tiarn Collins	(Sweden) William Mathisen	(United States) Luke Winkelmann
6	27 March 2022	(Switzerland) Silvaplana	SS	(Norway) Marcus Kleveland	(Norway) Mons Røisland	(Australia) Valentino Guseli

=== Big Air ===
Season	Date	Place	Event	Winner	Second	Third
1	23 October 2021	(Switzerland) Chur	BA	(Switzerland) Jonas Boesiger	(Finland) Rene Rinnekangas	(Sweden) Sven Thorgren
2	4 December 2021	(United States) Steamboat	BA	(China) Su Yiming	(Austria) Clemens Millauer	(Norway) Mons Roisland

== Women ==
=== Snowboard Cross ===
Season	Date	Place	Event	Winner	Second	Third
1	28 November 2021	(China) Secret Garden	SBX	(Czech Republic) Eva Samková	(United Kingdom) Charlotte Bankes	(Italy) Michela Moioli
2	10 December 2021	(Austria) Montafon	SBX	(United Kingdom) Charlotte Bankes	(Australia) Belle Brockhoff	(France) Chloé Trespeuch
3	18 December 2021	(Italy) Cervinia	SBX	(Italy) Michela Moioli	(United States) Faye Gulini	(Australia) Belle Brockhoff
4	8 January 2022	(Russia) Krasnoyarsk	SBX	(United Kingdom) Charlotte Bankes	(France) Chloé Trespeuch	(United States) Lindsey Jacobellis
5	9 January 2022	(Russia) Krasnoyarsk	SBX	(United Kingdom) Charlotte Bankes	(France) Chloé Trespeuch	(United States) Lindsey Jacobellis
	22 January 2022	(Italy) Chiesa in Valmalenco	SBX	Cancelled		
6	29 January 2022	(Italy) Cortina d'Ampezzo	SBX	(Italy) Michela Moioli	(France) Chloé Trespeuch	(United Kingdom) Charlotte Bankes
	26 February 2022	(Canada) Mont Sainte-Anne	SBX	Cancelled		
7	12 March 2022	(Austria) Reiteralm	SBX	(United Kingdom) Charlotte Bankes	(Italy) Michela Moioli	(Canada) Audrey McManiman
8	20 March 2022	(Switzerland) Veysonnaz	SBX	(United Kingdom) Charlotte Bankes	(United States) Faye Gulini	(France) Manon Petit-Lenoir

=== Parallel ===
Season	Date	Place	Event	Winner	Second	Third
1	11 December 2021	(Russia) Lake Bannoye	PGS	(Russia) Sofia Nadyrshina	(Germany) Ramona Theresia Hofmeister	(Germany) Carolin Langenhorst
2	12 December 2021	(Russia) Lake Bannoye	PSL	(Switzerland) Julie Zogg	(Japan) Tsubaki Miki	(Russia) Anastasiya Kurochkina
3	16 December 2021	(Italy) Carezza	PGS	(Austria) Daniela Ulbing	(Czech Republic) Ester Ledecká	(Germany) Ramona Theresia Hofmeister
4	18 December 2021	(Italy) Cortina d'Ampezzo	PGS	(Czech Republic) Ester Ledecká	(Russia) Sofia Nadyrshina	(Switzerland) Ladina Jenny
5	8 January 2022	(Switzerland) Scuol	PGS	(Austria) Sabine Schöffmann	(Switzerland) Julie Zogg	(Switzerland) Ladina Jenny
6	11 January 2022	(Austria) Bad Gastein	PSL	(Austria) Daniela Ulbing	(Germany) Ramona Theresia Hofmeister	(Russia) Natalia Soboleva
7	14 January 2022	(Austria) Simonhöhe	PGS	(Poland) Aleksandra Król	(Austria) Julia Dujmovits	(Germany) Melanie Hochreiter (Russia) Sofia Nadyrshina
	26 February 2022	(Russia) Moscow	GS	Cancelled		
8	12 March 2022	(Italy) Piancavallo	PSL	(Japan) Tsubaki Miki (Switzerland) Julie Zogg		(Germany) Ramona Theresia Hofmeister
9	16 March 2022	(Slovenia) Rogla	PGS	(Germany) Ramona Theresia Hofmeister	(Japan) Tsubaki Miki	(Netherlands) Michelle Dekker
10	19 March 2022	(Germany) Berchtesgaden	PSL	(Switzerland) Julie Zogg	(Canada) Megan Farrell	(Germany) Ramona Theresia Hofmeister

=== Halfpipe ===
Season	Date	Place	Event	Winner	Second	Third
1	11 December 2021	(United States) Copper Mountain	HP	(China) Cai Xuetong	(Japan) Sena Tomita	(Spain) Queralt Castellet
2	8 January 2022	(United States) Mammoth	HP	(Japan) Ruki Tomita	(China) Cai Xuetong	(Japan) Sena Tomita
3	15 January 2022	(Switzerland) Laax	HP	(United States) Chloe Kim	(Japan) Mitsuki Ono	(Spain) Queralt Castellet

=== Slopestyle ===
Season	Date	Place	Event	Winner	Second	Third
1	1 January 2022	(Canada) Calgary	SS	(Japan) Kokomo Murase	(Japan) Miyabi Onitsuka	(Canada) Laurie Blouin
2	8 January 2022	(United States) Mammoth	SS	(United States) Jamie Anderson	(New Zealand) Zoi Sadowski-Synnott	(Japan) Kokomo Murase
3	15 January 2022	(Switzerland) Laax	SS	(Australia) Tess Coady	(Austria) Anna Gasser	(Germany) Annika Morgan
4	6 March 2022	(Georgia (country)) Bakuriani	SS	(Canada) Laurie Blouin	(Canada) Jasmine Baird	(Switzerland) Bianca Gisler
5	19 March 2022	(Czech Republic) Špindlerův Mlýn	SS	(Japan) Kokomo Murase	(Canada) Jasmine Baird	(Switzerland) Ariane Burri
6	27 March 2022	(Switzerland) Silvaplana	SS	(Austria) Anna Gasser	(Canada) Laurie Blouin	(Japan) Kokomo Murase

=== Big Air ===
Season	Date	Place	Event	Winner	Second	Third
1	23 October 2021	(Switzerland) Chur	BA	(Japan) Kokomo Murase	(Austria) Anna Gasser	(Canada) Jasmine Baird
2	4 December 2021	(United States) Steamboat	BA	(Japan) Reira Iwabuchi	(Austria) Anna Gasser	(Germany) Annika Morgan

== Team ==
=== Parallel mixed ===
Season	Date	Place	Event	Winner	Second	Third
1	12 January 2022	(Austria) Bad Gastein	PSL_{M}	Austria IV Arvid Auner; Julia Dujmovits	Russia II Dmitry Karlagachev; Natalia Soboleva	Germany I Elias Huber; Ramona Theresia Hofmeister
2	15 January 2022	(Austria) Simonhöhe	PGS_{M}	Austria III Alexander Payer; Sabine Schöffmann	Germany IV Stefan Baumeister; Melanie Hochreiter	South Korea I Lee Sang-ho; Jeong Hae-rim
3	13 March 2022	(Italy) Piancavallo	PSL_{M}	Austria II Benjamin Karl; Daniela Ulbing	Italy I Edwin Coratti; Nadya Ochner	Austria III Alexander Payer; Sabine Schöffmann
4	20 March 2022	(Germany) Berchtesgaden	PSL_{M}	Germany IX Stefan Baumeister; Ramona Theresia Hofmeister	Austria III Alexander Payer; Sabine Schöffmann	Italy V Maurizio Bormolini; Elisa Caffont

=== Snowboard cross team mixed ===
Season	Date	Place	Event	Winner	Second	Third
1	11 December 2021	(Austria) Montafon	BXT	Italy I Lorenzo Sommariva; Michela Moioli	Czech Republic I Jan Kubičík; Eva Samková	France I Quentin Sodogas; Chloé Trespeuch
	27 February 2022	(Canada) Mont Sainte-Anne	BXT	Cancelled		

== Men's standings ==
=== Parallel overall (PSL/PGS) ===
Rank	after all 10 races	Points
1	(South Korea) Lee Sang-ho	604
2	(Germany) Stefan Baumeister	506
3	(Italy) Edwin Coratti	408
4	(Austria) Andreas Prommegger	383
5	(Russia) Dmitry Loginov	326

=== Parallel slalom ===
Rank	after all 4 races	Points
1	(Austria) Andreas Prommegger	266
2	(South Korea) Lee Sang-ho	245
3	(Austria) Arvid Auner	201
4	(Italy) Edwin Coratti	200
5	(Austria) Benjamin Karl	145

=== Parallel giant slalom ===
Rank	after all 6 races	Points
1	(Germany) Stefan Baumeister	384
2	(South Korea) Lee Sang-ho	359
3	(Slovenia) Tim Mastnak	286
4	(Russia) Dmitry Loginov	252
5	(Italy) Mirko Felicetti	219

=== Snowboard Cross ===
Rank	after all 8 races	Points
1	(Germany) Martin Nörl	460
2	(Austria) Alessandro Hämmerle	386
3	(Austria) Jakob Dusek	370
4	(Canada) Éliot Grondin	347
5	(Italy) Lorenzo Sommariva	296

=== Freestyle overall (BA/SS/HP) ===
Rank	after all 11 races	Points
1	(Norway) Mons Røisland	253
2	(New Zealand) Tiarn Collins	251
3	(Japan) Ayumu Hirano	250
4	(Germany) Leon Vockensperger	224
5	(Australia) Valentino Guseli	220

=== Halfpipe ===
Rank	after all 3 races	Points
1	(Japan) Ayumu Hirano	250
2	(Japan) Ruka Hirano	206
3	(Switzerland) Jan Scherrer	160
4	(United States) Shaun White	114
5	(Japan) Yūto Totsuka	111

=== Slopestyle ===
Rank	after all 6 races	Points
1	(New Zealand) Tiarn Collins	236
2	(Germany) Leon Vockensperger	181
3	(Norway) Mons Røisland	173
4	(Australia) Valentino Guseli	155
5	(Canada) Sébastien Toutant	145

=== Big Air ===
Rank	after all 2 races	Points
1	(Switzerland) Jonas Boesiger	100
2	(China) Su Yiming	100
3	(Finland) Rene Rinnekangas	98
4	(Austria) Clemens Millauer	80
5	(Norway) Mons Roisland	80

== Women's standings ==
=== Parallel overall (PSL/PGS) ===
Rank	after all 10 races	Points
1	(Germany) Ramona Theresia Hofmeister	557
2	(Switzerland) Julie Zogg	540
3	(Austria) Daniela Ulbing	508
4	(Japan) Tsubaki Miki	466
5	(Germany) Carolin Langenhorst	370

=== Parallel slalom ===
Rank	after all 4 races	Points
1	(Switzerland) Julie Zogg	345
2	(Japan) Tsubaki Miki	252
3	(Germany) Ramona Theresia Hofmeister	250
4	(Austria) Daniela Ulbing	245
5	(Canada) Megan Farrell	152

=== Parallel giant slalom ===
Rank	after all 6 races	Points
1	(Germany) Ramona Theresia Hofmeister	307
2	(Russia) Sofia Nadyrshina	291
3	(Austria) Daniela Ulbing	263
4	(Switzerland) Ladina Jenny	251
5	(Austria) Sabine Schöffmann	244

=== Snowboard Cross ===
Rank	after all 8 races	Points
1	(United Kingdom) Charlotte Bankes	669
2	(Italy) Michela Moioli	501
3	(France) Chloé Trespeuch	464
4	(Australia) Belle Brockhoff	280
5	(Canada) Audrey McManiman	275

=== Freestyle overall (BA/SS/HP) ===
Rank	after all 11 races	Points
1	(Japan) Kokomo Murase	456
2	(Austria) Anna Gasser	340
3	(Canada) Jasmine Baird	310
4	(Canada) Laurie Blouin	260
5	(Japan) Reira Iwabuchi	246

=== Halfpipe ===
Rank	after all 3 races	Points
1	(China) Cai Xuetong	216
2	(Japan) Sena Tomita	190
3	(Japan) Mitsuki Ono	175
4	(Spain) Queralt Castellet	120
5	(Japan) Haruna Matsumoto	117

=== Slopestyle ===
Rank	after all 6 races	Points
1	(Japan) Kokomo Murase	320
2	(Canada) Laurie Blouin	240
3	(Canada) Jasmine Baird	210
4	(Switzerland) Ariane Burri	197
5	(Netherlands) Melissa Peperkamp	195

=== Big Air ===
Rank	after all 2 races	Points
1	(Austria) Anna Gasser	160
2	(Japan) Reira Iwabuchi (Japan) Kokomo Murase	136
4	(Canada) Jasmine Baird (Germany) Annika Morgan	100

== Team ==
=== Parallel Team ===
Rank	after all 4 races	Points
1	Austria III	280
2	Austria IV	235
3	Austria II	184
4	Switzerland II	130
5	Switzerland I	126

=== Snowboard Cross Team ===
Rank	after all 1 race	Points
1	Italy I	100
2	Czech Republic I	80
3	France I	60
4	Australia I	50
5	Canada I	45

== Nations Cup ==
=== Overall ===
Rank	after all 63 races	Points
1	Austria	3991
2	Germany	3351
3	Switzerland	3093
4	Italy	2946
5	Canada	2928

== Podium table by nation ==
Table showing the World Cup podium places (gold–1st place, silver–2nd place, bronze–3rd place) by the countries represented by the athletes.

Rank	Nation	Gold	Silver	Bronze	Total
1	Austria	13	10	4	27
2	Japan	9	6	4	19
3	Germany	8	5	11	24
4	Italy	7	4	5	16
5	Switzerland	5	3	5	13
6	Great Britain	5	1	1	7
7	United States	4	3	7	14
8	Canada	3	5	4	12
9	Russia	2	3	4	9
10	Czech Republic	2	2	0	4
11	China	2	1	0	3
12	Norway	1	3	1	5
13	South Korea	1	2	4	7
14	Australia	1	2	3	6
15	New Zealand	1	1	1	3
16	Poland	1	1	0	2
17	France	0	5	4	9
18	Netherlands	0	1	1	2
18	Slovenia	0	1	1	2
18	Sweden	0	1	1	2
21	Finland	0	1	0	1
22	Spain	0	0	3	3
Totals (22 entries)		65	61	64	190
