= 2019–20 FIS Snowboard World Cup =

International snowboarding competition

| Discipline | Men | Women |
| Parallel overall | (Italy) Roland Fischnaller | (Germany) Ramona Theresia Hofmeister |
| Parallel slalom | (Austria) Andreas Prommegger | (Switzerland) Julie Zogg |
| Parallel giant slalom | (Italy) Roland Fischnaller | (Germany) Ramona Theresia Hofmeister |
| Snowboard cross | (Austria) Alessandro Hämmerle | (Italy) Michela Moioli |
| Freestyle overall | (Australia) Scotty James | (China) Cai Xuetong |
| Halfpipe | (Australia) Scotty James | (China) Cai Xuetong |
| Slopestyle | (Japan) Ruki Tobita | (United Kingdom) Katie Ormerod |
| Big Air | (United States) Chris Corning | (Japan) Reira Iwabuchi |
- Nations Cup Overall: Italy

Competition
| Locations | 24 venues | 24 venues |
| Individual | 29 events | 29 events |
| Team | 2/2 | 2/2 |

The 2019–20 FIS Snowboard World Cup was the 26th World Cup season in snowboarding organised by International Ski Federation. The season started on 24 August 2019 in Cardrona, New Zealand and concluded on 13 March 2020 in Veysonnaz, Switzerland. Competitions consisted of parallel slalom, parallel giant slalom, snowboard cross, halfpipe, slopestyle and big air.

== Men ==
=== Snowboard Cross ===
| Season | Date | Place | Event | Winner | Second | Third |
|---|---|---|---|---|---|---|
| 1 | 13 December 2019 | (Austria) Montafon | SBX | (Austria) Alessandro Hämmerle | (Australia) Cameron Bolton | (Italy) Omar Visintin |
| 2 | 21 December 2019 | (Italy) Cervinia | SBX | (Italy) Lorenzo Sommariva | (Italy) Emanuel Perathoner | (France) Merlin Surget |
| 3 | 25 January 2020 | (Canada) Big White | SBX | (Italy) Omar Visintin | (Canada) Éliot Grondin | (United States) Alex Deibold |
| 4 | 26 January 2020 | (Canada) Big White | SBX | (Italy) Lorenzo Sommariva | (Austria) Jakob Dusek | (United States) Senna Leith |
| | 1 February 2020 | (Germany) Feldberg | SBX | Cancelled | | |
| 5 | 7 March 2020 | (Spain) Sierra Nevada | SBX | (Spain) Lucas Eguibar | (Austria) Alessandro Hämmerle | (Germany) Paul Berg |
| 6 | 13 March 2020 | (Switzerland) Veysonnaz | SBX | (Austria) Alessandro Hämmerle | (Italy) Omar Visintin | (Australia) Adam Dickson |

=== Parallel ===
| Season | Date | Place | Event | Winner | Second | Third |
|---|---|---|---|---|---|---|
| 1 | 7 December 2019 | (Russia) Lake Bannoye | PSL | (Austria) Andreas Prommegger | (Italy) Aaron March | (Italy) Maurizio Bormolini |
| 2 | 8 December 2019 | (Russia) Lake Bannoye | PGS | (Italy) Roland Fischnaller | (Italy) Mirko Felicetti | (Austria) Benjamin Karl |
| 3 | 14 December 2019 | (Italy) Cortina d'Ampezzo | PGS | (Italy) Roland Fischnaller | (South Korea) Lee Sang-ho | (Russia) Igor Sluev |
| | 19 December 2019 | (Italy) Carezza | PGS | Cancelled | | |
| 4 | 11 January 2020 | (Switzerland) Scuol | PGS | (Russia) Andrey Sobolev | (Austria) Benjamin Karl | (Switzerland) Dario Caviezel (Poland) Oskar Kwiatkowski |
| 5 | 14 January 2020 | (Austria) Bad Gastein | PSL | (Italy) Daniele Bagozza | (Italy) Maurizio Bormolini | (Germany) Stefan Baumeister |
| 6 | 18 January 2020 | (Slovenia) Rogla | PGS | (Italy) Edwin Coratti | (Italy) Roland Fischnaller | (Russia) Vic Wild |
| 7 | 25 January 2020 | (Italy) Piancavallo | PSL | (Austria) Andreas Prommegger | (Italy) Roland Fischnaller | (Germany) Stefan Baumeister |
| | 13 February 2020 | (Austria) Lackenhof | PGS | Cancelled | | |
| 8 | 22 February 2020 | (South Korea) Pyeongchang | PGS | (Italy) Roland Fischnaller | (Russia) Dmitry Loginov | (Russia) Andrey Sobolev |
| 9 | 29 February 2020 | (Canada) Blue Mountain | PGS | (Italy) Mirko Felicetti (Austria) Benjamin Karl | Not awarded | (Russia) Andrey Sobolev |
| 10 | 1 March 2020 | (Canada) Blue Mountain | PGS | (Russia) Dmitry Loginov | (Germany) Stefan Baumeister | (Italy) Edwin Coratti |
| | 6 March 2020 | (Russia) Moscow | PSL | Cancelled | | |
| | 10 March 2020 | (Italy) Livigno | PSL | Cancelled | | |
| | 14 March 2020 | (Germany) Winterberg | PSL | Cancelled | | |

=== Halfpipe ===
| Season | Date | Place | Event | Winner | Second | Third |
|---|---|---|---|---|---|---|
| 1 | 14 December 2019 | (United States) Copper Mountain | HP | (Australia) Scotty James | (Japan) Yūto Totsuka | (Japan) Ruka Hirano |
| 2 | 22 December 2019 | (China) Secret Garden | HP | (Australia) Scotty James | (Japan) Yūto Totsuka | (Japan) Ruka Hirano |
| 3 | 18 January 2020 | (Switzerland) Laax | HP | (Australia) Scotty James | (Japan) Yūto Totsuka | (United States) Taylor Gold |
| 4 | 31 January 2020 | (United States) Mammoth | HP | (Japan) Yūto Totsuka | (United States) Taylor Gold | (Japan) Ruka Hirano |
| 5 | 14 February 2020 | (Canada) Calgary | HP | (Japan) Ruka Hirano | (Australia) Scotty James | (Switzerland) Patrick Burgener |

=== Slopestyle ===
| Season | Date | Place | Event | Winner | Second | Third |
|---|---|---|---|---|---|---|
| 1 | 17 January 2020 | (Switzerland) Laax | SS | (Canada) Sébastien Toutant | (United States) Redmond Gerard | (United States) Justus Henkes |
| 2 | 23 January 2020 | (Italy) Seiser Alm | SS | (Russia) Vlad Khadarin | (Japan) Ruki Tobita | (Japan) Hiroaki Kunitake |
| 3 | 1 February 2020 | (United States) Mammoth | SS | (United States) Dusty Henricksen | (Japan) Ryoma Kimata | (United States) Justus Henkes |
| 4 | 16 February 2020 | (Canada) Calgary | SS | (New Zealand) Tiarn Collins | (Japan) Ruki Tobita | (Canada) Liam Brearley |
| | 21 March 2020 | (Czech Republic) Špindlerův Mlýn | SS | Cancelled | | |

=== Big Air ===
| Season | Date | Place | Event | Winner | Second | Third |
|---|---|---|---|---|---|---|
| 1 | 25 August 2019 | (New Zealand) Cardrona | BA | (United States) Chris Corning | (United States) Redmond Gerard | (Finland) Kalle Järvilehto |
| 2 | 2 November 2019 | (Italy) Modena | BA | (Canada) Nicolas Laframboise | (Canada) Mark McMorris | (United States) Chris Corning |
| 3 | 14 December 2019 | (China) Beijing | BA | (Canada) Maxence Parrot | (Sweden) Sven Thorgren | (United States) Chris Corning |
| 4 | 21 December 2019 | (United States) Atlanta | BA | (United States) Chris Corning | (Canada) Nicolas Laframboise | (Japan) Ryoma Kimata |
| | 4 January 2020 | (Germany) Düsseldorf | BA | Cancelled | | |

== Ladies ==
=== Snowboard Cross ===
| Season | Date | Place | Event | Winner | Second | Third |
|---|---|---|---|---|---|---|
| 1 | 13 December 2019 | (Austria) Montafon | SBX | (Czech Republic) Eva Samková | (Italy) Michela Moioli | (Australia) Belle Brockhoff |
| 2 | 21 December 2019 | (Italy) Cervinia | SBX | (Italy) Michela Moioli | (France) Chloé Trespeuch | (Italy) Sofia Belingheri |
| 3 | 25 January 2020 | (Canada) Big White | SBX | (Italy) Michela Moioli | (Australia) Belle Brockhoff | (Italy) Raffaella Brutto |
| 4 | 26 January 2020 | (Canada) Big White | SBX | (Australia) Belle Brockhoff | (Italy) Michela Moioli | (United States) Faye Gulini |
| | 1 February 2020 | (Germany) Feldberg | SBX | Cancelled | | |
| 5 | 7 March 2020 | (Spain) Sierra Nevada | SBX | (France) Chloé Trespeuch | (Italy) Michela Moioli | (Australia) Belle Brockhoff |
| 6 | 13 March 2020 | (Switzerland) Veysonnaz | SBX | (Italy) Michela Moioli | (France) Chloé Trespeuch | (Australia) Belle Brockhoff |

=== Parallel ===
| Season | Date | Place | Event | Winner | Second | Third |
|---|---|---|---|---|---|---|
| 1 | 7 December 2019 | (Russia) Lake Bannoye | PSL | (Switzerland) Julie Zogg | (Germany) Selina Jörg | (Switzerland) Ladina Jenny |
| 2 | 8 December 2019 | (Russia) Lake Bannoye | PGS | (Germany) Ramona Theresia Hofmeister | (Switzerland) Ladina Jenny | (Austria) Claudia Riegler |
| 3 | 14 December 2019 | (Italy) Cortina d'Ampezzo | PGS | (Germany) Ramona Theresia Hofmeister | (Germany) Selina Jörg | (Austria) Claudia Riegler |
| | 19 December 2019 | (Italy) Carezza | PGS | Cancelled | | |
| 4 | 11 January 2020 | (Switzerland) Scuol | PGS | (Germany) Ramona Theresia Hofmeister | (Russia) Sofia Nadyrshina | (Russia) Milena Bykova |
| 5 | 14 January 2020 | (Austria) Bad Gastein | PSL | (Germany) Ramona Theresia Hofmeister | (Czech Republic) Ester Ledecká | (Switzerland) Julie Zogg |
| 6 | 18 January 2020 | (Slovenia) Rogla | PGS | (Czech Republic) Ester Ledecká | (Germany) Ramona Theresia Hofmeister | (Russia) Natalia Soboleva |
| 7 | 25 January 2020 | (Italy) Piancavallo | PSL | (Switzerland) Julie Zogg | (Germany) Selina Jörg | (Germany) Ramona Theresia Hofmeister |
| | 13 February 2020 | (Austria) Lackenhof | PGS | Cancelled | | |
| 8 | 22 February 2020 | (South Korea) Pyeongchang | PGS | (Switzerland) Julie Zogg | (Italy) Nadya Ochner | (Switzerland) Ladina Jenny |
| 9 | 29 February 2020 | (Canada) Blue Mountain | PGS | (Germany) Ramona Theresia Hofmeister | (Germany) Selina Jörg | (Austria) Daniela Ulbing |
| 10 | 1 March 2020 | (Canada) Blue Mountain | PGS | (Germany) Ramona Theresia Hofmeister | (Russia) Sofia Nadyrshina | (Germany) Selina Jörg |
| | 6 March 2020 | (Russia) Moscow | PSL | Cancelled | | |
| | 10 March 2020 | (Italy) Livigno | PSL | Cancelled | | |
| | 14 March 2020 | (Germany) Winterberg | PSL | Cancelled | | |

=== Halfpipe ===
| Season | Date | Place | Event | Winner | Second | Third |
|---|---|---|---|---|---|---|
| 1 | 14 December 2019 | (United States) Copper Mountain | HP | (Spain) Queralt Castellet | (China) Liu Jiayu | (United States) Maddie Mastro |
| 2 | 20 December 2019 | (China) Secret Garden | HP | (China) Liu Jiayu | (China) Cai Xuetong | (United States) Maddie Mastro |
| 3 | 18 January 2020 | (Switzerland) Laax | HP | (Spain) Queralt Castellet | (China) Cai Xuetong | (China) Liu Jiayu |
| 4 | 31 January 2020 | (United States) Mammoth | HP | (China) Cai Xuetong | (United States) Maddie Mastro | (China) Liu Jiayu |
| 5 | 14 February 2020 | (Canada) Calgary | HP | (China) Cai Xuetong | (Japan) Mitsuki Ono | (China) Liu Jiayu |

=== Slopestyle ===
| Season | Date | Place | Event | Winner | Second | Third |
|---|---|---|---|---|---|---|
| 1 | 17 January 2020 | (Switzerland) Laax | SS | (United States) Julia Marino | (Japan) Reira Iwabuchi | (United Kingdom) Katie Ormerod |
| 2 | 23 January 2020 | (Italy) Seiser Alm | SS | (Australia) Tess Coady | (United Kingdom) Katie Ormerod | (Canada) Brooke Voigt |
| 3 | 1 February 2020 | (United States) Mammoth | SS | (United States) Jamie Anderson | (Canada) Laurie Blouin | (United Kingdom) Katie Ormerod |
| 4 | 16 February 2020 | (Canada) Calgary | SS | (Canada) Laurie Blouin | (Norway) Silje Norendal | (United Kingdom) Katie Ormerod |
| | 21 March 2020 | (Czech Republic) Špindlerův Mlýn | SS | Cancelled | | |

=== Big Air ===
| Season | Date | Place | Event | Winner | Second | Third |
|---|---|---|---|---|---|---|
| 1 | 25 August 2019 | (New Zealand) Cardrona | BA | (Finland) Enni Rukajärvi | (United Kingdom) Katie Ormerod | (Norway) Silje Norendal |
| 2 | 2 November 2019 | (Italy) Modena | BA | (Japan) Reira Iwabuchi | (Canada) Brooke Voigt | (Austria) Anna Gasser |
| 3 | 14 December 2019 | (China) Beijing | BA | (Japan) Miyabi Onitsuka | (Austria) Anna Gasser | (Canada) Laurie Blouin |
| 4 | 21 December 2019 | (United States) Atlanta | BA | (Japan) Reira Iwabuchi | (Japan) Kokomo Murase | (Canada) Brooke Voigt |
| | 4 January 2020 | (Germany) Düsseldorf | BA | Cancelled | | |

== Team ==
=== Parallel mixed ===
| Season | Date | Place | Event | Winner | Second | Third |
|---|---|---|---|---|---|---|
| 1 | 15 January 2020 | (Austria) Bad Gastein | PSL_{Mx} | Germany I Ramona Theresia Hofmeister; Stefan Baumeister | Austria I Claudia Riegler; Andreas Prommegger | Switzerland I Julie Zogg; Dario Caviezel |
| 2 | 26 January 2020 | (Italy) Piancavallo | PSL_{Mx} | Germany I Ramona Theresia Hofmeister; Stefan Baumeister | Italy I Nadya Ochner; Daniele Bagozza | Austria I Claudia Riegler; Andreas Prommegger |
| | 14 February 2020 | (Austria) Lackenhof | PSL_{Mx} | Cancelled | | |
| | 15 March 2020 | (Germany) Winterberg | PSL_{Mx} | Cancelled | | |

=== Snowboardcross team ===
| Season | Date | Place | Event | Winner | Second | Third |
|---|---|---|---|---|---|---|
| | 26 January 2020 | (Canada) Big White Ski Resort | SBT_{M} | Cancelled | | |
| | 26 January 2020 | (Canada) Big White Ski Resort | SBT_{W} | Cancelled | | |
| | 2 February 2020 | (Germany) Feldberg | SBT_{Mx} | Cancelled | | |

== Men's standings ==
=== Parallel overall (PSL/PGS) ===
| Rank | after all 10 races | Points |
|---|---|---|
| 1 | (Italy) Roland Fischnaller | 6650 |
| 2 | (Germany) Stefan Baumeister | 4165 |
| 3 | (Russia) Dmitry Loginov | 3832 |
| 4 | (Russia) Andrey Sobolev | 3632 |
| 5 | (Austria) Benjamin Karl | 3596 |

=== Parallel slalom ===
| Rank | after all 3 races | Points |
|---|---|---|
| 1 | (Austria) Andreas Prommegger | 2260 |
| 2 | (Italy) Roland Fischnaller | 1750 |
| 3. | (Germany) Stefan Baumeister | 1600 |
| 4 | (Italy) Daniele Bagozza | 1580 |
| 5 | (Italy) Maurizio Bormolini | 1510 |

=== Parallel giant slalom ===
| Rank | after all 7 races | Points |
|---|---|---|
| 1 | (Italy) Roland Fischnaller | 4900 |
| 2 | (Austria) Benjamin Karl | 3380 |
| 3 | (Russia) Dmitry Loginov | 2882 |
| 4 | (Russia) Andrey Sobolev | 2812 |
| 5 | (Italy) Mirko Felicetti | 2810 |

=== Snowboard Cross ===
| Rank | after all 6 races | Points |
|---|---|---|
| 1 | (Austria) Alessandro Hämmerle | 3960 |
| 2 | (Italy) Lorenzo Sommariva | 3450 |
| 3 | (Italy) Omar Visintin | 2930 |
| 4 | (Spain) Lucas Eguibar | 2430 |
| 5 | (Austria) Jakob Dusek | 2250 |

=== Freestyle overall (BA/SBS/HP) ===
| Rank | after all 13 races | Points |
|---|---|---|
| 1 | (Australia) Scotty James | 3800 |
| 2 | (Japan) Yūto Totsuka | 3400 |
| 3 | (United States) Chris Corning | 3250 |
| 4 | (Japan) Ruka Hirano | 2800 |
| 5 | (Japan) Ryoma Kimata | 2800 |

=== Halfpipe ===
| Rank | after all 5 races | Points |
|---|---|---|
| 1 | (Australia) Scotty James | 3800 |
| 2 | (Japan) Yūto Totsuka | 3400 |
| 3 | (Japan) Ruka Hirano | 2800 |
| 4 | (Switzerland) Jan Scherrer | 1810 |
| 5 | (Germany) Andre Höflich | 1750 |

=== Slopestyle ===
| Rank | after all 4 races | Points |
|---|---|---|
| 1 | (Japan) Ruki Tobita | 1616.4 |
| 2 | (New Zealand) Tiarn Collins | 1340 |
| 3 | (United States) Dusty Henricksen | 1290 |
| 4 | (United States) Justus Henkes | 1226 |
| 5 | (Russia) Vlad Khadarin | 1096 |

=== Big Air ===
| Rank | after all 4 races | Points |
|---|---|---|
| 1 | (United States) Chris Corning | 3200 |
| 2 | (Canada) Nicolas Laframboise | 2300 |
| 3 | (Japan) Ryoma Kimata | 1820 |
| 4 | (Finland) Kalle Järvilehto | 1220 |
| 5 | (Sweden) Sven Thorgren | 1120 |

== Ladies' standings ==
=== Parallel overall (PSL/PGS) ===
| Rank | after all 10 races | Points |
|---|---|---|
| 1 | (Germany) Ramona Theresia Hofmeister | 8260 |
| 2 | (Switzerland) Julie Zogg | 5660 |
| 3 | (Germany) Selina Jörg | 4930 |
| 4 | (Switzerland) Ladina Jenny | 4570 |
| 5 | (Austria) Daniela Ulbing | 3296 |

=== Parallel slalom ===
| Rank | after all 3 races | Points |
|---|---|---|
| 1 | (Switzerland) Julie Zogg | 2600 |
| 2 | (Germany) Ramona Theresia Hofmeister | 1960 |
| 3 | (Germany) Selina Jörg | 1740 |
| 4 | (Switzerland) Ladina Jenny | 1500 |
| 5 | (Austria) Daniela Ulbing | 1310 |

=== Parallel giant slalom ===
| Rank | after all 7 races | Points |
|---|---|---|
| 1 | (Germany) Ramona Theresia Hofmeister | 6300 |
| 2 | (Germany) Selina Jörg | 3190 |
| 3 | (Switzerland) Ladina Jenny | 3070 |
| 4 | (Switzerland) Julie Zogg | 3060 |
| 5 | (Russia) Sofia Nadyrshina | 2660 |

=== Snowboard Cross ===
| Rank | after all 6 races | Points |
|---|---|---|
| 1 | (Italy) Michela Moioli | 5400 |
| 2 | (Australia) Belle Brockhoff | 4100 |
| 3 | (France) Chloé Trespeuch | 3340 |
| 4 | (Czech Republic) Eva Samková | 3210 |
| 5 | (United States) Faye Gulini | 2030 |

=== Freestyle overall (BA/SBS/HP) ===
| Rank | after all 13 races | Points |
|---|---|---|
| 1 | (China) Cai Xuetong | 4000 |
| 2 | (United Kingdom) Katie Ormerod | 3760 |
| 3 | (Japan) Reira Iwabuchi | 3700 |
| 4 | (China) Liu Jiayu | 3600 |
| 5 | (Canada) Laurie Blouin | 3250 |

=== Halfpipe ===
| Rank | after all 5 races | Points |
|---|---|---|
| 1 | (China) Cai Xuetong | 3600 |
| 2 | (China) Liu Jiayu | 3000 |
| 3 | (Spain) Queralt Castellet | 2850 |
| 4 | (United States) Maddie Mastro | 2500 |
| 5 | (China) Wu Shaotong | 1740 |

=== Slopestyle ===
| Rank | after all 4 races | Points |
|---|---|---|
| 1 | (United Kingdom) Katie Ormerod | 2600 |
| 2 | (Canada) Laurie Blouin | 2200 |
| 3 | (Canada) Brooke Voigt | 1250 |
| 4 | (Norway) Hanne Eilertsen | 1240 |
| 5 | (Belgium) Loranne Smans | 1100 |

=== Big Air ===
| Rank | after all 4 races | Points |
|---|---|---|
| 1 | (Japan) Reira Iwabuchi | 2900 |
| 2 | (Canada) Brooke Voigt | 1620 |
| 3 | (Japan) Miyabi Onitsuka | 1580 |
| 4 | (United Kingdom) Katie Ormerod | 1510 |
| 5 | (Austria) Anna Gasser | 1400 |

== Team ==
=== Parallel Team ===
| Rank | after all 2 races | Points |
|---|---|---|
| 1 | Germany I | 2000 |
| 2 | Austria I | 1400 |
| 3 | Italy I | 1300 |
| 4 | Switzerland I | 1050 |
| 5 | Russia I | 790 |

== Nations Cup ==
=== Overall ===
| Rank | after all 60 races | Points |
|---|---|---|
| 1 | Italy | 35121.2 |
| 2 | Germany | 31536.5 |
| 3 | United States | 30632.9 |
| 4 | Switzerland | 29651.7 |
| 5 | Japan | 29123.0 |

== Podium table by nation ==
Table showing the World Cup podium places (gold–1st place, silver–2nd place, bronze–3rd place) by the countries represented by the athletes.

| Rank | Nation | Gold | Silver | Bronze | Total |
|---|---|---|---|---|---|
| 1 | Italy | 12 | 12 | 5 | 29 |
| 2 | Germany | 8 | 6 | 5 | 19 |
| 3 | Japan | 5 | 9 | 5 | 19 |
| 4 | Austria | 5 | 5 | 6 | 16 |
| 5 | United States | 5 | 4 | 10 | 19 |
| 6 | Australia | 5 | 3 | 4 | 12 |
| 7 | Canada | 4 | 5 | 4 | 13 |
| 8 | Russia | 3 | 3 | 6 | 12 |
| 9 | China | 3 | 3 | 3 | 9 |
| 10 | Switzerland | 3 | 1 | 6 | 10 |
| 11 | Spain | 3 | 0 | 0 | 3 |
| 12 | Czech Republic | 2 | 1 | 0 | 3 |
| 13 | France | 1 | 2 | 1 | 4 |
| 14 | Finland | 1 | 0 | 1 | 2 |
| 15 | New Zealand | 1 | 0 | 0 | 1 |
| 16 | Great Britain | 0 | 2 | 3 | 5 |
| 17 | Norway | 0 | 1 | 1 | 2 |
| 18 | South Korea | 0 | 1 | 0 | 1 |
| 18 | Sweden | 0 | 1 | 0 | 1 |
| 20 | Poland | 0 | 0 | 1 | 1 |
| Totals (20 entries) | | 61 | 59 | 61 | 181 |
