= Huw Nightingale =

British snowboarder (born 2001)

Personal information
- Full name: Huw William Harvey Nightingale
- Nationality: British
- Born: 12 November 2001 (age 24) Bolton, England

Sport
- Country: United Kingdom
- Sport: Snowboarding
Medal record
Men's snowboarding
Representing Great Britain
Olympic Games
Gold medal – first place	2026 Milano Cortina	Mixed team snowboard cross
World Championships
Gold medal – first place	2023 Bakuriani	Mixed team snowboard cross

Huw William Harvey Nightingale (born 12 November 2001) is a British snowboarder, competing in the snowboard cross discipline. He was named to Great Britain's 2022 Winter Olympics team. In the 2026 Winter Olympics, he, alongside partner Charlotte Bankes, won Great Britain's first ever gold medal in a snow event.

== Career ==
Nightingale was born in Bolton, and at the age of five, he moved with his family to Westendorf in Austria where his family ran a B&B. He later went to Mayrhofen for six months of each year to receive snowboard cross training. He fluently speaks the local dialect.

At his first Olympic Games, in 2022, Nightingale placed sixth in the mixed event alongside Charlotte Bankes.

On 3 March 2023, Nightingale made history with teammate Charlotte Bankes, to claim the country’s first ever snowboard cross mixed team title, at the 2023 World Championships.

On 14 December 2025, Nightingale won the gold medal alongside Charlotte Bankes, in the mixed team event at the Snowboard Cross World Cup in Cervinia, Italy.

Nightingale has spoken about his role in the team: "The guy's job is to try and stay in contact with everybody and as close as possible. There's no point in them doing everything to win because if they crash, that's a big problem. If I can make a massive lead, perfect. But otherwise, first, second or third, it's more the time gap that matters."

Nightingale competed in two events for Great Britain at the 2026 Winter Olympics. He came tenth in the men's snowboard cross, and teamed up with Charlotte Bankes for the mixed team competition, with the duo winning the gold medal, the first ever gold medal for Great Britain in a snow sport and the second medal for Great Britain at the Games overall.

== Career results ==
=== Olympic medals ===
Year	Event	Teammate	Location	Position	Ref
2026	Men's snowboard cross	—N/a	(Italy) Livigno	10th	
2026	Mixed team snowboard cross	Charlotte Bankes	(Italy) Livigno	1st	
