= Eva Adamczyková =

Czech snowboarder (born 1993)

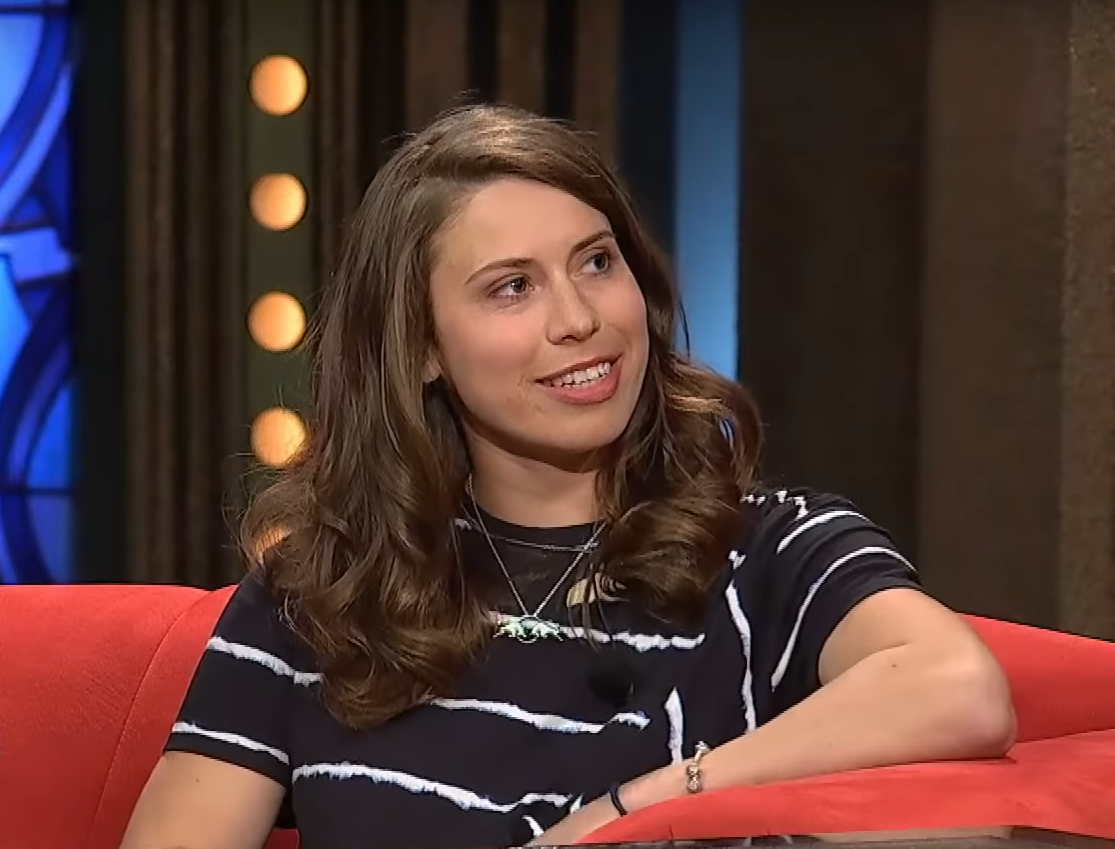
- Eva Samková (2019)

Personal information
- Nationality: Czech
- Born: Eva Samková; 28 April 1993 (age 33) Vrchlabí, Czech Republic
- Height: 1.71 m (5 ft 7 in)
- Weight: 68 kg (150 lb)
- Children: 1
- Website: evasamkova.cz

Sport
- Country: Czech Republic
- Sport: Snowboarding
- Event: Snowboard cross
- Club: Dukla Liberec
- Coached by: Marek Jelínek, Jakub Flejšar

Achievements and titles
- Olympic finals: Gold medal in Snowboard cross at Sochi 2014
- World finals: Gold medal in Snowboard cross at Utah 2019
- Highest world ranking: 1st in Snowboard Cross World Cup (2017, 2019, 2021)
Medal record
Women's snowboarding
Representing Czech Republic
Olympic Games
Gold medal – first place	2014 Sochi	Snowboard cross
Silver medal – second place	2026 Milano Cortina	Snowboard cross
Bronze medal – third place	2018 Pyeongchang	Snowboard cross
World Championships
Gold medal – first place	2019 Utah	Snowboard cross
Gold medal – first place	2023 Bakuriani	Snowboard cross
Bronze medal – third place	2021 Idre	Snowboard cross
Winter X Games
Silver medal – second place	2014 Aspen	Snowboard cross
Silver medal – second place	2016 Aspen	Snowboard cross
Winter Universiade
Gold medal – first place	2013 Trentino	Snowboard cross

Eva Adamczyková, née Samková (Czech pronunciation: [ˈɛva ˈadamt͡ʃɪkovaː]; born 28 April 1993) is a Czech snowboarder who is the 2014 Olympic champion in snowboard cross. She is also the 2019 and 2023 World Champion in the same discipline.

== Career ==
Samková initially competed in freestyle snowboarding but after several injuries she began competing in snowboard cross in the 2008/2009 season. Her trainers are Marek Jelínek and Jakub Flejšar. Her signature in competitions is a moustache drawn on her upper lip.

Samková won the Junior World Championship three times (2010, 2011, 2013) and the Czech national title in 2013. She also won three races of the World Cup series (Blue Mountain and Montafon 2013, Vallnord-Arcalís 2014). After skipping the 2011/2012 season due to knee injury, she was placed 4th in the FIS Snowboard World Cup series in the 2012/2013 season and in December 2013 she won the Winter Universiade.

Samková took part in the 2014 Winter Olympics in Sochi, where she won the Czech Republic's first gold medal of the games, in snowboard cross. Samková attracted additional comment because she participated in the quarter-final, semi-final and final races with a moustache drawn on her face, which she said was for luck. In the same year Samková placed second at the Winter X Games in Aspen.

At the FIS Freestyle Ski and Snowboarding World Championships 2019, Samková became world champion in Snowboard Cross, defeating Brit Charlotte Bankes in the final. Two years later at the 2021 World Championships, Samková took bronze behind Bankes and Michela Moioli. On 11 December 2021, Samková broke both ankles, when she and Czech compatriot Jan Kubičík took silver in the mixed race during a 2021–22 World Cup event in Montafon, Austria. After fourteen months recovery from injury Adamczyková won in her first past-injury races at the FIS Freestyle Ski and Snowboarding World Championships 2023 and claimed her second world championships gold medal.

At the 2026 Winter Olympics she won the silver medal.

== World Cup results ==
All results are sourced from the International Ski Federation (FIS).

=== Season titles ===
- 3 titles – (3 snowboard cross)

Season	Discipline
2017	Snowboard Cross
2019	Snowboard Cross
2021	Snowboard Cross

=== Season standings ===
Season	Snowboard Cross
2010	30
2011	7
2012	37
2013	4
2014	5
2015	—
2016	2
2017	1
2018	5
2019	1
2020	4
2021	1
2022	14
2023	4
2024	5
2025	—
2026	7

=== Race podiums ===
- 19 wins – (19 SBX)
- 33 podiums – (33 SBX)

Season	Date	Location	Discipline	Place
2010–11	18 March 2011	Valmalenco, Italy	Snowboard Cross	2nd
2012–13	2 February 2013	Blue Mountain, Canada	Snowboard Cross	1st
2012–13	16 March 2013	Veysonnaz, Switzerland	Snowboard Cross	3rd
2013–14	7 December 2013	Montafon, Austria	Snowboard Cross	1st
2013–14	12 January 2014	Vallnord-Arcalís, Andorra	Snowboard Cross	1st
2015–16	23 January 2015	Feldberg, Germany	Snowboard Cross	1st
2015–16	21 February 2016	Sunny Valley, Russia	Snowboard Cross	1st
2015–16	27 February 2016	Bogwang, South Korea	Snowboard Cross	3rd
2015–16	5 March 2016	Veysonnaz, Switzerland	Snowboard Cross	3rd
2015–16	20 March 2016	Baqueira Beret, Spain	Snowboard Cross	2nd
2016–17	21 January 2017	(United States) Solitude, USA	Snowboard Cross	1st
2016–17	4 February 2017	Bansko, Bulgaria	Snowboard Cross	2nd
2016–17	12 February 2017	Feldberg, Germany	Snowboard Cross	1st
2016–17	25 March 2017	Veysonnaz, Switzerland	Snowboard Cross	2nd
2017–18	20 January 2018	Erzurum, Turkey	Snowboard Cross	1st
2017–18	3 March 2018	La Molina, Spain	Snowboard Cross	1st
2017–18	10 March 2018	Moscow, Russia	Snowboard Cross	1st
2018–19	21 December 2018	Cervinia, Italy	Snowboard Cross	2nd
2018–19	22 December 2018	Cervinia, Italy	Snowboard Cross	1st
2018–19	9 February 2019	Feldberg, Germany	Snowboard Cross	3rd
2018–19	2 March 2019	Baqueira Beret, Spain	Snowboard Cross	1st
2018–19	16 March 2019	Veysonnaz, Switzerland	Snowboard Cross	1st
2019–20	13 December 2019	Montafon, Austria	Snowboard Cross	1st
2020–21	23 January 2021	Chiesa, Italy	Snowboard Cross	3rd
2020–21	24 January 2021	Chiesa, Italy	Snowboard Cross	1st
2020–21	4 March 2021	(Georgia (country)) Bakuriani, Georgia	Snowboard Cross	1st
2020–21	20 March 2021	Veysonnaz, Switzerland	Snowboard Cross	1st
2021–22	28 November 2021	Secret Garden, China	Snowboard Cross	1st
2022–23	16 March 2023	Veysonnaz, Switzerland	Snowboard Cross	2nd
2023–24	26 January 2024	St. Moritz, Switzerland	Snowboard Cross	1st
2023–24	3 February 2024	(Georgia (country)) Gudauri, Georgia	Snowboard Cross	2nd
2023–24	2 March 2024	Sierra Nevada, Spain	Snowboard Cross	2nd
2023–24	9 March 2024	Cortina d'Ampezzo, Italy	Snowboard Cross	2nd

== Olympic results ==
Year	Snowboard Cross
(Russia) 2014 Sochi	1
(South Korea) 2018 Pyeongchang	3
(Italy) 2026 Milano Cortina	2

== World Championships results ==
Year	Snowboard Cross
(Spain) 2011 La Molina	5
(Canada) 2013 Stoneham	7
(Austria) 2015 Kreischberg	7
(Spain) 2017 Sierra Nevada	12
(United States) 2019 Utah	1
(Sweden) 2021 Idre	3
(Georgia (country)) 2023 Bakuriani	1

== Personal life ==
Samková had her own show called Eva tropí hlouposti (Eva Fools Around) named in reference to famous Czech comedy film by Martin Frič.

On 15 September 2022, Samková married Czech actor Marek Adamczyk. In 2023, the couple was invited to join the 12th season of Czech dancing reality TV show StarDance. She competed with her professional partner Jakub Mazůch and placed on the 2nd place, while her husband placed 6th.

On 16 February 2024 in Archa Theatre, Prague premiered documentary about Adamczyková named EFKA: Nejrychlejší holka ve vesmíru (EFKA: Quickest girl in the universe) directed by Markus Krug.

On 26 June 2024, Adamczyková announced on Instagram her pregnancy and pause in her career. On 13 January 2025, Adamczyková announced the birth of her son Kryštof.

Olympic Games
Preceded by Šárka Strachová	Flagbearer for Czech Republic; Pyeongchang 2018	Succeeded by Alena Mills; Michal Březina
