= Vail Ski & Snowboard Academy =

Public snow sports school in Colorado, US

Location
- 1 Academy Loop; PO Box 369; Minturn, Colorado 81645; United States; 39°33′52″N 106°24′43″W

Information
- Established: 2007 (19 years ago)
- School district: Eagle County Schools
- CEEB code: 061011
- NCES School ID: 080354006422
- Principal: Kari Bangtson
- Faculty: 20.2 FTEs
- Grades: 6–12
- Enrollment: 291 (as of 2023–24)
- Student to teacher ratio: 14.4:1
- Colors: Blue, Black, and White
- Mascot: Lloyd the Yeti
- Team name: Yetis
- Website: vssa.eagleschools.net

The Vail Ski & Snowboard Academy (VSSA) is a public school operated as part of the Eagle County Schools District, in Eagle County, Colorado, United States. It provides students in sixth through twelfth grades with a flexible schedule that allows them to participate in skiing and snowboarding training programs at Vail Resort. Additionally, VSSA partners with ice hockey, swimming, gymnastics, and figure skating programs in the Vail Valley, making it the first public winter sports academy in the United States.

== History ==
Established in 2007, the academy was developed after years of negotiations between district and club officials, making it the first such public ski and snowboard training academy in the US. As of 2011, the program serves about 200 students at the middle school and high school level, and includes individuals who competed at the 2010 Winter Olympics held in Vancouver, British Columbia, as well as members of the United States Ski Team and a number of elite-level junior competitors. Similar publicly funded winter sports training programs have existed in European countries for years, where they have achieved success in developing Olympic champions.

== Schedule ==
The academic year is structured so that students are in classes for a traditional school day during the fall and spring, while during the winter all academic programs are shifted to the afternoon to allow students the opportunity to train in their sport in the morning on school days, as well as all day Saturday and Sunday, with no training (and a full day of classes) on Mondays. The heavier academic load carried by students in the fall and spring allows for a lighter course load during the winter, while students are training and competing.

While students who were in traditional public school programs had been forced to miss up to 40 days each school year, VSSA is designed to coordinate with the schedules of the student-athletes in a program described by a school official as "No child left behind on the slopes". Students also have access to remote instruction while they are traveling for club sponsored competitions, both in the US and internationally.

== Partner Organizations & Athletics ==
VSSA is operated primarily in conjunction with Ski & Snowboard Club Vail, providing a traditional and flexible academic program while giving student-athletes the opportunity to train and compete at the international and Olympic level. VSSA students also partner with Vail Hockey, Avon Swim Club, Vail Gymnastics, and the Vail Recreation District to expand sports offerings. 62% of student-athletes competed at the national level, while 38% would continue their sport at the NCAA level.

== Academics ==
As of the 2023–24 school year, the school had an enrollment of 291 students and 20.2 classroom teachers (on an FTE basis), for a student–teacher ratio of 14.4:1.

In addition to its athletic program, in the 2024-2025 school year, VSSA students scored over 200 points higher on the SAT than the average Colorado high schooler, and was ranked the #7 public high school in the State of Colorado by U.S. News and World Report.

== Notable alumni ==
- Aaron Blunck, freestyle skier, three-time Olympian (2014, 2018, 2022)
- Tess Johnson, mogul skier, two-time Olympian (2018, 2026)
- Kai Owens, mogul skier, 2022 Olympian
- Paula Moltzan, alpine skier, Olympian (2022)
- Faye Gulini (also known as Faye Thelen), snowboard cross, five-time Olympian (2014–2026)
- Audrey Crowley, Para Alpine skier, 2021 US Para National Champion
