= Pia Zerkhold =

Austrian snowboarder (born 1998)

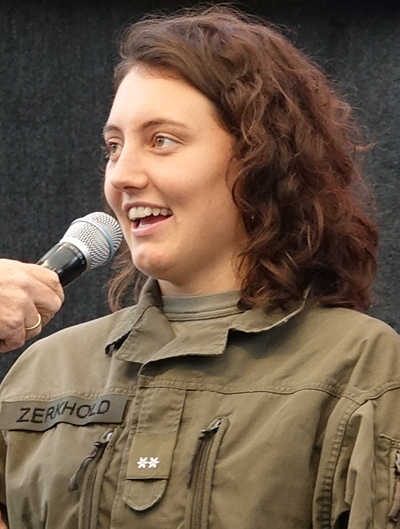
- Zerkhold in 2023

Personal information
- Nationality: Austrian
- Born: 26 October 1998 (age 27) Wiener Neustadt, Austria
- Height: 1.63 m (5 ft 4 in)

Sport
- Sport: Snowboarding
Medal record
Women's snowboarding
Representing Austria
World Championships
Silver medal – second place	2023 Bakuriani	Mixed team snowboard cross

Pia Zerkhold (born 26 October 1998) is an Austrian snowboarder. She competed at the 2022 and 2026 Winter Olympics in snowboard cross, and mixed team snowboard cross.

She competed at the 2018–19 FIS Snowboard World Cup, 2019–20 FIS Snowboard World Cup, 2020–21 FIS Snowboard World Cup, and 2021–22 FIS Snowboard World Cup
