= Jasmine Baird =

Canadian snowboarder (born 1999)

Personal information
- Nicknames: Jas, Jazz
- Born: 29 June 1999 (age 27) Mississauga, Ontario, Canada
- Website: https://www.instagram.com/jasmine.baird/

Sport
- Country: Canada
- Sport: Snowboarding
- Events: Big air Slopestyle

Jasmine Baird (born 29 June 1999) is a Canadian snowboarder who competes internationally in the big air and slopestyle disciplines. Baird was born in Mississauga, but was raised in Georgetown, Ontario.

== Career ==
At the start of the 2021–22 FIS Snowboard World Cup, Baird won the bronze medal in the big air event at the stop in Chur, Switzerland.

On 19 January 2022, Baird was named to Canada's 2022 Olympic team in the Slopestyle and Big Air events.

== Life ==
She was 18 months old when she started snowboarding at Beaver Valley Ski Club in Ontario. At age 12, she started getting into slopestyle. She started competing competitively at age 15. She was very inspired by many people but in particular other female snowboarders.
