= Lake Bannoye =

Bannoye Lake
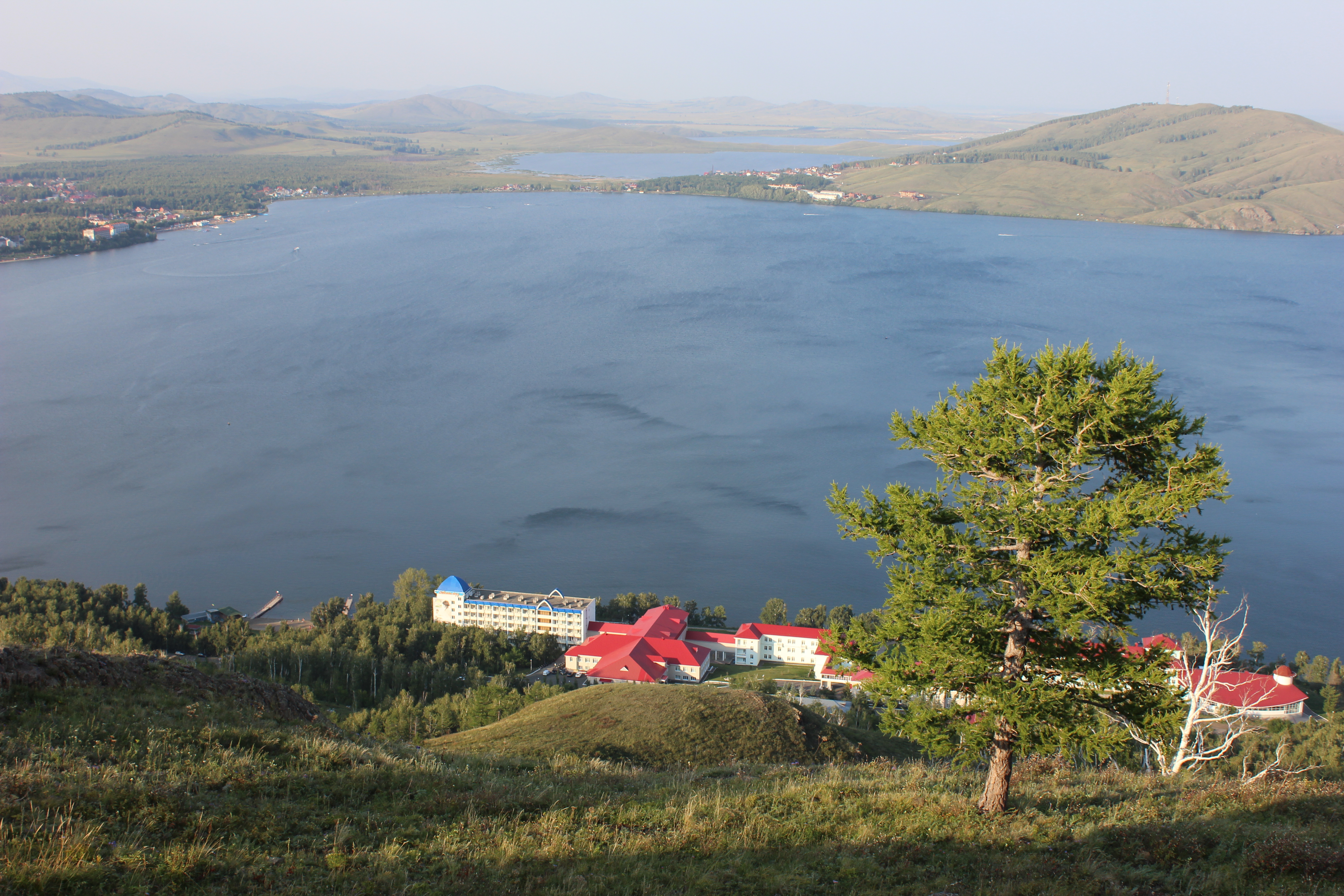

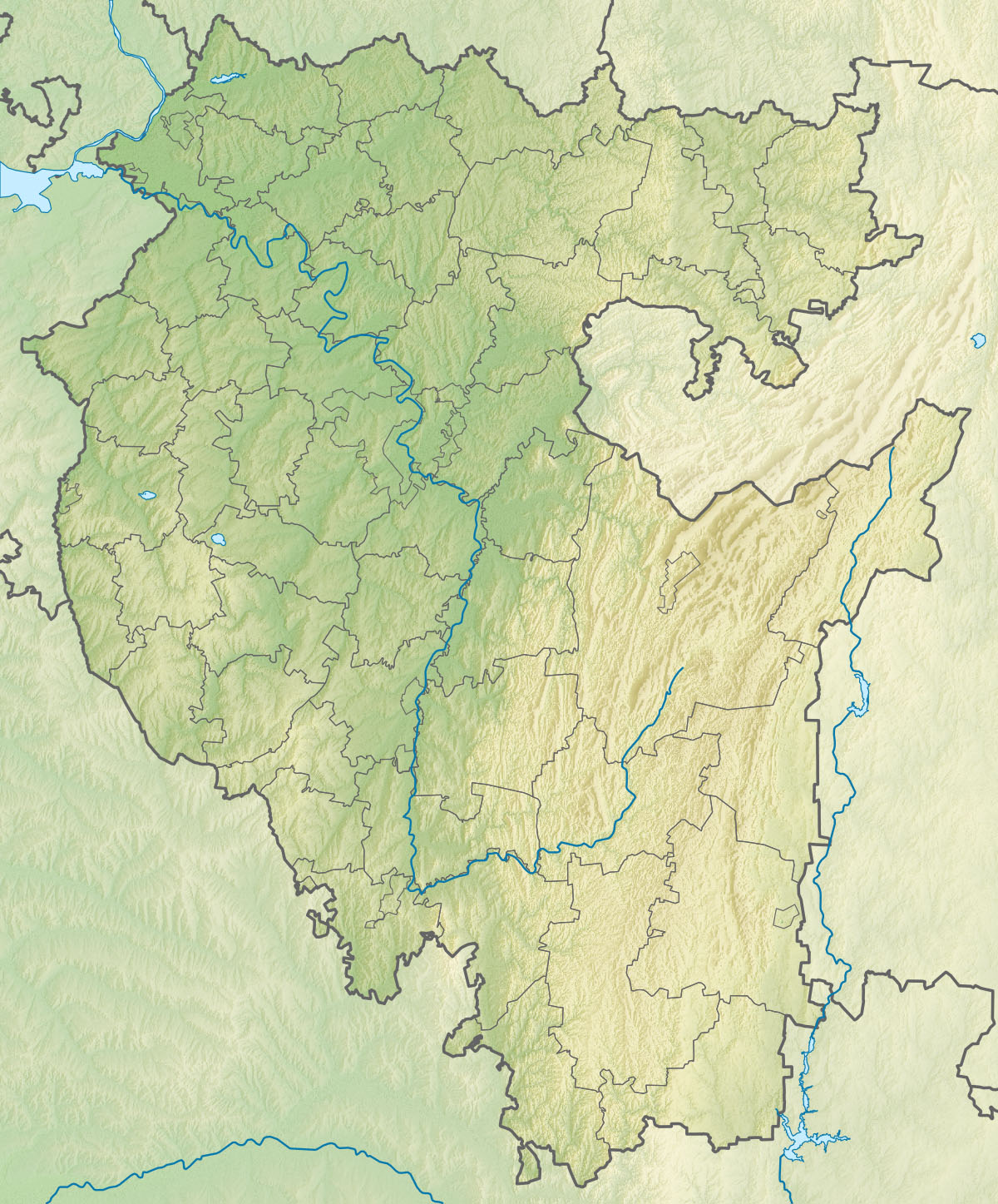
- Location within Bashkortostan Location within Russia
- Location: Bashkortostan
- Coordinates: 53°35′48″N 58°37′47″E
- Lake type: tectonic origin
- Primary outflows: Yangelka
- Catchment area: 36.3 km^{2} (14.0 sq mi)
- Basin countries: Russia
- Max. length: 4.2 km (2.6 mi)
- Max. width: 1.9 km (1.2 mi)
- Surface area: 7.7 km^{2} (3.0 sq mi)
- Average depth: 10.6 m (35 ft)
- Max. depth: 28 m (92 ft)
- Water volume: 81,700,000 km^{3} (19,600,000 cu mi)
- Surface elevation: 434 m (1,424 ft)

Bannoye (Russian: Банное), or Yaktykul (Bashkir: Яҡтыкүл, Yaqtıkül), is the name of a lake in the Republics of Bashkortostan in Russia, and a famous ski resort near it. It has a maximum depth of 28 meters.

The lake and its surroundings are favorite vacation spot. Around the lake are motels and resorts, there is a ski resort on the mountain Bashmak.

Since 1965, it is a natural monument.

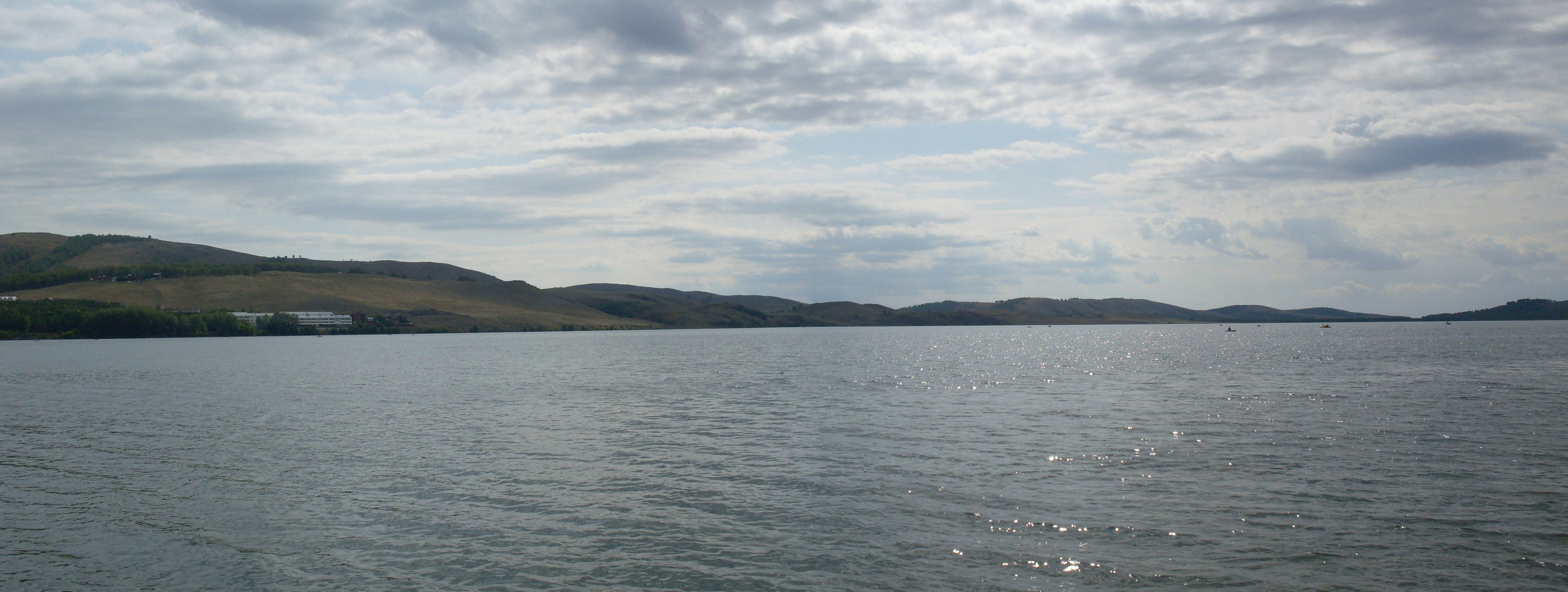
Bannoye Lake in 2009

== Etymology ==
The Russian name "Bannoye" means "washing", "bathing". A legend has it, that Yemelyan Pugachev's retinue rested by the lake for bathing. The Bashkir name "Yaktykul" means "clear", referring to its clarity.
