= FIS Freestyle Ski and Snowboarding World Championships 2017 =

2017 edition of the FIS Freestyle Ski and Snowboarding World Championships

- Logo
- Host city: Sierra Nevada
- Country: Spain
- Events: 26
- Opening: March 7, 2017
- Closing: March 19, 2017
- Website: Sierra Nevada 2017

The 2017 FIS Freestyle Ski and Snowboarding World Championships were held in Sierra Nevada, Spain, from March 6–19, 2017.

Snowboard cross team events for men and women were introduced to the championships schedule for the first time, bringing the total number of events contested to 26.

== Schedule ==
Q	Qualification	F	Final

Event↓/Date →	Wed 8		Thu 9		Fri 10	Sat 11	Sun 12	Mon 13	Tue 14	Wed 15	Thu 16	Fri 17	Sat 18		Sun 19
Freestyle skiing
Moguls	Q	F													
Dual moguls			Q	F											
Aerials			Q		F										
Halfpipe											Q		F		
Slopestyle												Q			F
Ski cross													Q	F	
Snowboarding
Big air											Q	F			
Halfpipe					Q	F									
Slopestyle			Q			F									
Snowboard cross					Q		F								
Snowboard cross team								F							
Parallel giant slalom											F				
Parallel slalom										F					

== Medalists ==
=== Freestyle skiing ===
==== Men's events ====
Event	Gold		Silver		Bronze	
Moguls	Ikuma Horishima; Japan	88.54	Benjamin Cavet; France	87.11	Mikaël Kingsbury; Canada	82.85
Dual moguls	Ikuma Horishima; Japan		Bradley Wilson; United States		Marco Tadé; Switzerland	
Aerials	Jonathon Lillis; United States	125.79	Qi Guangpu; China	120.36	David Morris; Australia	114.93
Halfpipe	Aaron Blunck; United States	91.80	Mike Riddle; Canada	89.60	Kevin Rolland; France	88.40
Slopestyle	McRae Williams; United States	93.80	Gus Kenworthy; United States	91.80	James Woods; Great Britain	90.40
Ski cross	Victor Öhling Norberg; Sweden		Jamie Prebble; New Zealand		François Place; France	

==== Women's events ====
Event	Gold		Silver		Bronze	
Moguls	Britteny Cox; Australia	83.63	Perrine Laffont; France	82.51	Justine Dufour-Lapointe; Canada	80.74
Dual moguls	Perrine Laffont; France		Yulia Galysheva; Kazakhstan		Jaelin Kauf; United States	
Aerials	Ashley Caldwell; United States	109.29	Danielle Scott; Australia	94.47	Xu Mengtao; China	91.65
Halfpipe	Ayana Onozuka; Japan	89.80	Marie Martinod; France	87.00	Devin Logan; United States	84.20
Slopestyle	Tess Ledeux; France	85.60	Emma Dahlström; Sweden	83.80	Isabel Atkin; Great Britain	83.20
Ski cross	Sandra Näslund; Sweden		Fanny Smith; Switzerland		Ophélie David; France	

=== Snowboarding ===
==== Men's events ====
Event	Gold		Silver		Bronze	
Big air	Ståle Sandbech; Norway	188.25	Chris Corning; United States	182.75	Marcus Kleveland; Norway	177.25
Halfpipe	Scott James; Australia	97.50	Iouri Podladtchikov; Switzerland	93.25	Patrick Burgener; Switzerland	90.50
Slopestyle	Seppe Smits; Belgium	91.40	Nicolas Huber; Switzerland	83.25	Chris Corning; United States	82.50
Snowboard cross	Pierre Vaultier; France		Lucas Eguibar; Spain		Alex Pullin; Australia	
Snowboard cross team	United States; Hagen Kearney; Nick Baumgartner		Spain; Regino Hernández; Lucas Eguibar		Canada; Kevin Hill; Christopher Robanske	
Parallel giant slalom	Andreas Prommegger; Austria		Benjamin Karl; Austria		Nevin Galmarini; Switzerland	
Parallel slalom	Andreas Prommegger; Austria		Benjamin Karl; Austria		Andrey Sobolev; Russia	

==== Women's events ====
Event	Gold		Silver		Bronze	
Big air	Anna Gasser; Austria	189.50	Enni Rukajärvi; Finland	165.25	Silje Norendal; Norway	162.75
Halfpipe	Cai Xuetong; China	90.75	Haruna Matsumoto; Japan	84.75	Clémence Grimal; France	79.00
Slopestyle	Laurie Blouin; Canada	78.00	Zoi Sadowski-Synnott; New Zealand	77.50	Miyabi Onitsuka; Japan	77.40
Snowboard cross	Lindsey Jacobellis; United States		Chloé Trespeuch; France		Michela Moioli; Italy	
Snowboard cross team	France; Nelly Moenne Loccoz; Chloé Trespeuch		France; Manon Petit; Charlotte Bankes		United States; Lindsey Jacobellis; Faye Gulini	
Parallel giant slalom	Ester Ledecká; Czech Republic		Patrizia Kummer; Switzerland		Ekaterina Tudegesheva; Russia	
Parallel slalom	Daniela Ulbing; Austria		Ester Ledecká; Czech Republic		Alena Zavarzina; Russia	

== Medal table ==
Rank	Nation	Gold	Silver	Bronze	Total
1	United States (USA)	6	3	4	13
2	France (FRA)	4	5	4	13
3	Austria (AUT)	4	2	0	6
4	Japan (JPN)	3	1	1	5
5	Australia (AUS)	2	1	2	5
6	Sweden (SWE)	2	1	0	3
7	Canada (CAN)	1	1	3	5
8	China (CHN)	1	1	1	3
9	Czech Republic (CZE)	1	1	0	2
10	Norway (NOR)	1	0	2	3
11	Belgium (BEL)	1	0	0	1
12	Switzerland (SUI)	0	4	3	7
13	New Zealand (NZL)	0	2	0	2
13	Spain (ESP)	0	2	0	2
15	Finland (FIN)	0	1	0	1
15	Kazakhstan (KAZ)	0	1	0	1
17	Russia (RUS)	0	0	3	3
18	Great Britain (GBR)	0	0	2	2
19	Italy (ITA)	0	0	1	1
Totals (19 entries)		26	26	26	78
