= Nelly Moenne-Loccoz =

French snowboarder (born 1990)

Medal record

Women's snowboarding

Representing France

World Championships
Gold medal – first place	2017 Sierra Nevada	Team snowboard cross

Winter X Games
Bronze medal – third place	2015 Aspen	Snowboard cross
Bronze medal – third place	2016 Aspen	Snowboard cross

Nelly Moenne-Loccoz (born 9 April 1990 in Annecy) is a snowboarder from France. She competed for France at the 2010 Winter Olympics in snowboard cross, finishing sixth.
