= Stacy Gaskill =

American snowboarder (born 2000)

Personal information
- Born: May 21, 2000 (age 26) Denver, Colorado, U.S.
- Height: 6 ft (183 cm)
- Website: stacygaskill.com

Sport
- Country: United States
- Sport: Snowboarding
- Event: Snowboard cross
- Club: Winter Park Snowboard Team

Stacy Gaskill (born May 21, 2000) is an American snowboarder who specializes in snowboard cross. She represented the United States at the 2022 and 2026 Winter Olympics. She is also a high level ultimate frisbee player who played on the United States U24 Women's National Team in 2019 and 2023.

== Early life ==
Stacy Gaskill was born in Denver, Colorado. Her mother, Martha Hill, is a Paralympic silver medalist and Olympic bronze medalist in para-alpine skiing. At the age of two, her parents taught her how to ski, and at the age of 8 she began snowboarding.

== Snowboard career ==
=== Early career ===
Gaskill began competing in snowboard cross at the age of 14. From 2014 - 2017 she ranked 1st in USASA (USA Snowboard Association) Rocky Mountain Series in her age category. She began competing in FIS Nor-Am Cup races in 2016.

In the 2017-18 season, Gaskill started in 11 FIS Nor-Am Cup races, placing 1st overall. This earned her a spot in the FIS Snowboard World Cup tour for the 2018-19 season.

From 2014 - 2018, she also competed internationally in freeride, where she placed 1st in the Freeride World Tour Junior American division in 2016 and 2017.

=== World Cup debut ===
In the 2018-19 season, Gaskill began exclusively training for snowboard cross and competing in the FIS Snowboard World Cup. She also competed for the first time in the FIS Snowboard World Championships, held in Solitude, USA, where she placed 22nd. In March, she shattered her right wrist at the World Cup stop in Baqueria Beret, Spain.

In the 2020-21 season, Gaskill started in six FIS World Cup races, finishing 11th overall. She also competed in the FIS World Championships in Idre Fjäll, Sweden, where she placed 6th. There she raced with Alex Diebold in the mixed team snowboard cross event, placing 9th.

=== Olympics to present ===
On January 24, 2022, Gaskill was named to the 2022 US Olympic Team. She competed at the 2022 Beijing Winter Olympics in the snowboard cross event, where she advanced to the semi-finals, placing 7th.

In December 2023, she placed 4th at the World Cup stop at Cervinia, Italy, achieving her career-best World Cup score despite being sick with the flu, later calling it her "Jordan Flu Game" race.

On December 3, 2024, Gaskill tore her ACL in a fall during a World Cup training run at Cervinia, Italy. She had surgery in January and again in May. She described the rehab as, “...definitely the hardest one of my career. “ A year later, on December 13, 2025, Gaskill returned to the same World Cup course at Cervinia, and won 10th place.

On January 28, 2026, Gaskill was named to the 2026 US Olympic Team. She competed at the 2026 Milan Cortina Winter Olympics in the snowboard cross event, where she advanced to the quarterfinals, placing 14th. She also competed in the mixed team snowboard cross event, where she raced with Nathan Pare, placing 14th.

== Ultimate frisbee career ==
Gaskill began playing ultimate while attending High School in Lakewood, Colorado.

From 2018 through 2021, she played for the club level team Molly Brown based in Denver, Colorado.

In 2018, Gaskill was named to the US U20 (under 20) Women's National Team, who won gold at the 2018 World Junior Ultimate Championships in Waterloo, Canada.

In 2019, she was named to the US U24 Women's National Team.

From 2019 to 2022, Gaskill played for the University of Colorado's Women's Ultimate Team, Quandary.

In 2022, she was awarded Ultiworld’s D-I Women’s 2022 Defensive Player Of The Year Award.

In 2023, she returned to Molly Brown and was again named to the US U24 Women's National Team.

In 2024, she played for the WUL team, Utah Wild.
