= Lorenzo Sommariva =

Italian snowboarder (born 1993)

Personal information
- Nationality: Italian
- Born: 5 August 1993 (age 32) Genoa, Italy
- Height: 1.87 m (6 ft 2 in)

Sport
- Country: Italy
- Sport: Snowboarding
- Event: Snowboard cross
Medal record
Men's snowboarding
Representing Italy
Olympic Games
Silver medal – second place	2026 Milano Cortina	Mixed team snowboard cross
World Championships
Silver medal – second place	2021 Idre	Mixed team snowboard cross

Lorenzo Sommariva (born 5 August 1993) is an Italian snowboarder. He competed in the snowboard cross at the 2018 Winter Olympics and the snowboard cross and mixed team snowboard cross at the 2022 Winter Olympics.
