= Michela Moioli =

Italian snowboarder (born 1995)

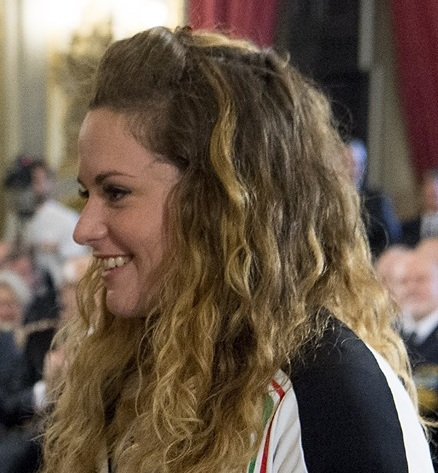

Personal information
- Nationality: Italian
- Born: 17 July 1995 (age 30) Alzano Lombardo, Italy
- Height: 1.73 m (5 ft 8 in)
- Weight: 65 kg (143 lb)

Sport
- Country: Italy
- Sport: Snowboarding
- Event: Snowboard cross
- Club: C.S. Esercito
- Coached by: Luca Pozzolini

Achievements and titles
- Olympic finals: Gold medal at 2018 Winter Olympics in Pyeongchang; Bronze medal at 2026 Winter Olympics in Livigno
- World finals: Gold Medal at 2025 World Championships; Silver Medal at 2021 World Championships in Idre; Bronze Medal at 2015 World Championships in Kreischberg; Bronze Medal at 2017 World Championships in Sierra Nevada; Bronze Medal at 2019 World Championships in Utah
- Highest world ranking: 1st in Snowboard Cross World Cup (2016, 2018, 2020)
Medal record
Women's snowboarding
Representing Italy
International snowboarding competitions
Event	1st	2nd	3rd
Olympic Games	1	2	1
World Championships	1	3	3
Junior World Championships	0	0	2
Total	2	5	6
Olympic Games
Gold medal – first place	2018 Pyeongchang	Snowboard cross
Silver medal – second place	2022 Beijing	Mixed team snowboard cross
Silver medal – second place	2026 Milano Cortina	Mixed team snowboard cross
Bronze medal – third place	2026 Milano Cortina	Snowboard cross
World Championships
Gold medal – first place	2025 Engadin	Snowboard cross
Silver medal – second place	2019 Utah	Mixed team snowboard cross
Silver medal – second place	2021 Idre	Snowboard cross
Silver medal – second place	2021 Idre	Mixed team snowboard cross
Bronze medal – third place	2015 Kreichsberg	Snowboard cross
Bronze medal – third place	2017 Sierra Nevada	Snowboard cross
Bronze medal – third place	2019 Utah	Snowboard cross

Michela Moioli (born 17 July 1995) is an Italian snowboarder. She has represented Italy at the 2014 Winter Olympics in Sochi, and at the 2018 Winter Olympics in PyeongChang, winning a gold medal. She competed at the 2022 Winter Olympics, in Women's snowboard cross.

== Biography ==
Qualified young at the age of 18 for the Olympic final of the snowboardcross in Sochi 2014, a bad fall ousted her from the fight for the podium. As a result of this injury, she had to undergo a cruciate ligament surgery that caused her to close the World Cup competitive season prematurely.

== World Cup ==
=== Overall ===
Season	Rank	Points
2013	3rd	3170
2014	27th	540
2015	3rd	1900
2016	1st	5100
2017	2nd	4490
2018	1st	8410
2019	3rd	2650
2020	1st	5400
2021	2nd	430
2022	2nd	501
2023	-	-
2024	3rd	704

=== Podium ===
#	Date	Place	Discipline	Rank
1	17 February 2013	(Russia) Sochi	Snowboardcross	1st
2	9 March 2013	(Switzerland) Arosa	Snowboardcross	2nd
3	14 March 2015	(Switzerland) Veysonnaz	Snowboardcross	1st
4	23 January 2016	(Germany) Feldberg	Snowboardcross	2nd
5	24 January 2016	(Germany) Feldberg	Snowboardcross	3rd
6	21 February 2016	(Russia) Sunny Valley	Snowboardcross	3rd
7	27 February 2016	(South Korea) Bokwang	Snowboardcross	2nd
8	6 March 2016	(Switzerland) Veysonnaz	Snowboardcross	1st
9	21 January 2017	(United States) Solitude Mountain Resort	Snowboardcross	2nd
10	11 February 2017	(Germany) Feldberg	Snowboardcross	1st
11	5 March 2017	(Spain) La Molina	Snowboardcross	1st
12	25 March 2017	(Switzerland) Veysonnaz	Snowboardcross	3rd
13	13 December 2017	(France) Val Thorens	Snowboardcross	3rd
14	16 December 2017	(Austria) Montafon	Snowboardcross	1st
15	22 December 2017	(Italy) Cervinia	Snowboardcross	1st
16	20 January 2018	(Turkey) Erzurum	Snowboardcross	3rd
17	27 January 2018	(Bulgaria) Bansko	Snowboardcross	2nd
18	3 February 2018	(Germany) Feldberg	Snowboardcross	1st
19	4 February 2018	(Germany) Feldberg	Snowboardcross	1st
20	10 March 2018	(Russia) Moscow	Snowboardcross	2nd
21	17 March 2018	(Switzerland) Veysonnaz	Snowboardcross	1st
22	22 December 2018	(Italy) Cervinia	Snowboardcross	3rd
23	9 February 2019	(Germany) Feldberg	Snowboardcross	2nd
24	16 March 2019	(Switzerland) Veysonnaz	Snowboardcross	3rd
25	13 December 2019	(Austria) Montafon	Snowboardcross	2nd
26	21 December 2019	(Italy) Cervinia	Snowboardcross	1st
27	25 January 2020	(Canada) Big White	Snowboardcross	1st
28	26 January 2020	(Canada) Big White	Snowboardcross	2nd
29	7 March 2020	(Spain) Sierra Nevada	Snowboardcross	2nd
30	13 March 2020	(Switzerland) Veysonnaz	Snowboardcross	1st
31	23 January 2021	(Italy) Chiesa in Valmalenco	Snowboardcross	1st
32	18 February 2021	(Austria) Reiteralm	Snowboardcross	1st
33	20 March 2021	(Switzerland) Veysonnaz	Snowboardcross	2nd
34	28 November 2021	(China) Secret Garden	Snowboardcross	3rd
35	18 December 2021	(Italy) Cervinia	Snowboardcross	1st
36	29 January 2022	(Italy) Cortina d'Ampezzo	Snowboardcross	1st
37	12 March 2022	(Austria) Reiteralm	Snowboardcross	2nd
38	3 December 2023	(France) Les Deux Alpes	Snowboardcross	2nd
39	3 March 2024	(Spain) Sierra Nevada	Snowboardcross	1st
40	9 March 2024	(Italy) Cortina d'Ampezzo	Snowboardcross	3rd
41	16 March 2024	(Austria) Montafon	Snowboardcross	1st
42	24 March 2024	(Canada) Mont-Sainte-Anne	Snowboardcross	2nd
43	1 February 2025	(China) Beidahu	Snowboardcross	2nd
44	8 March 2025	(Georgia (country)) Gudauri	Snowboardcross	3rd

Winter Olympics
Preceded by Arianna Fontana	Flag bearer for Italy; 2022 Beijing	Succeeded by incumbent
