= Manon Petit-Lenoir =

French snowboarder (born 1998)

Personal information
- Born: 7 December 1998 (age 27) Clermont-Ferrand, France

Sport
- Country: France
- Sport: Snowboarding
Medal record
Women's snowboarding
Representing France
World Championships
Silver medal – second place	2017 Sierra Nevada	Team snowboard cross
Youth Olympic Games
Gold medal – first place	2016 Lillehammer	Snowboard cross

Manon Petit-Lenoir (born 7 December 1998) is a French snowboarder. She competed in the 2022 Winter Olympics, in Women's Snowboard Cross.

She competed at the 2016 Youth Olympic Games, 2018–19 FIS Snowboard World Cup, 2019–20 FIS Snowboard World Cup, 2020–21 FIS Snowboard World Cup, and 2021–22 FIS Snowboard World Cup.
