= Lara Casanova =

Swiss snowboarder (born 1996)

Personal information
- Nationality: Swiss
- Born: 25 October 1996 (age 29)
- Height: 1.67 m (5 ft 6 in)

Sport
- Sport: Snowboarding

Lara Casanova (born 25 October 1996) is a Swiss snowboarder. She competed at the 2018 Winter Olympics, and at the 2022 Winter Olympics, in Women's snowboard cross.
