= Jana Fischer =

German snowboarder (born 1999)

Personal information
- Nationality: German
- Born: 8 May 1999 (age 27) Titisee-Neustadt, Germany
- Height: 1.74 m (5 ft 9 in)

Sport
- Sport: Snowboarding
Medal record
Women's snowboarding
Representing Germany
Winter Youth Olympics
Gold medal – first place	2016 Lillehammer	Team snowboard ski cross

Jana Fischer (born 8 May 1999) is a German snowboarder. She competed in the 2018 Winter Olympics. and in the 2022 Winter Olympics, in Women's snowboard cross.
