= Raffaella Brutto =

Italian snowboarder (born 1988)

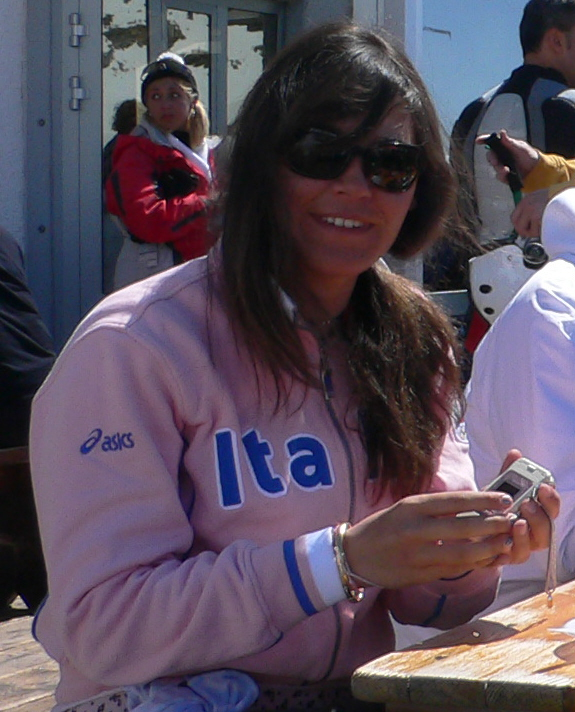

Personal information
- Born: 10 January 1988 (age 38) Genoa, Italy

Sport
- Sport: Skiing

World Cup career
- Indiv. podiums: 2

Raffaella Brutto (born 10 January 1988 in Genoa) is an Italian snowboarder, specializing in snowboard cross.

Brutto competed at the 2010 and 2014 Winter Olympics for Italy. In 2010, she was 17th in the qualification round of the snowboard cross, not advancing. In the 2014 snowboard cross, she was 19th in the seeding round, and then 4th in her quarterfinal, not advancing and ending 16th overall.

As of September 2014, her best showing at the World Championships is 6th, in 2013.

Brutto made her World Cup debut in January 2006. As of September 2014, she has two World Cup podium finishes, with her best a silver at Montafon in 2012–13. Her best overall finish is 7th, in 2012–13.

== World Cup podiums ==
Date	Location	Rank	Event
7 December 2012	Montafon	2nd place, silver medalist(s)	Snowboard cross
15 March 2014	La Molina	3rd place, bronze medalist(s)	Snowboard cross
