= Faye Thelen =

American snowboarder (born 1992)

Personal information
- Nickname: GU
- Born: Faye Gulini; March 24, 1992 (age 34) Salt Lake City, Utah, U.S.
- Education: Westminster College
- Height: 5 ft 4 in (1.63 m)
- Weight: 126 lb (57 kg)
- Spouse: Jake Thelen

Sport
- Country: United States
- Sport: Snowboarding
- Coached by: Mike Jankowski
Medal record
Women's snowboarding
Representing the United States
World Championships
| Bronze medal – third place | 2017 Sierra Nevada | Team snowboard cross |

Faye Thelen (née Gulini, born March 24, 1992) is a professional American snowboarder born in Salt Lake City, Utah. She competes for the US Snowboarding Team in the disciplines of snowboard cross, slopestyle, and halfpipe. She is a five-time Olympian (2010, 2014, 2018, 2022, 2026).

== Early life ==
Gulini started riding at a ski resort at Snowbird, in her home state, when she was nine years old. Her siblings, Erin, Zachary, and Nate, were the ones that originally got her into snowboarding. Her hobbies include rock climbing, skateboarding and camping. She likes soccer, wakeboarding and swimming in lakes and in the ocean.

== Career ==
At the age of 10, Gulini joined the Snowbird Snowboard Team. Her first snowboard cross event was at age 10 in Jackson Hole, Wyoming. At age 14, she decided to pursue her dream of becoming a professional snowboarder. Gulini moved from her house and her family in Salt Lake City, Utah, to Vail, Colorado, where she attended the Vail Ski and Snowboard Academy.

Gulini debuted on FIS races on December 15, 2006, in the halfpipe discipline at age 14. The race was located in Breckenridge, Colorado. After many good performances, Gulini won her first FIS event on January 27, 2008, in the slopestyle discipline. The race was held in Park City, Utah.

=== 2008 - 2010 ===
Her first World Cup appearance was in Lake Placid, New York, where she competed in the snowboard cross discipline. The event was held on March 1, 2008, and she finished in the 30th position. Seven months later, she ended in the 9th position in the World Cup held in Saas-Fee, Switzerland. With several great performances in the years 2009 and 2010, Gulini landed the results needed for a spot in the 2010 Winter Olympics held in Vancouver, British Columbia, Canada.

=== 2010 Winter Olympics ===
In her first experience in a Winter Olympic, Gulini made it through the qualification round ending in 12th place with a time of 1:30.75 that was scored on her first run. Later, she was eliminated in the quarterfinals and finished in 12th place overall.

=== 2011 ===
After the Olympics, Gulini ended in 2nd place in the FIS Junior World Championship held in Cardrona, New Zealand, in the snowboard cross discipline. She started 2011 on her right foot and riding well enough to take a spot in the FIS Snowboard World Championships in both snowboard cross and slopestyle. Gulini also finished 9th in 2011 Winter X Games. Unfortunately, in March of that year, Gulini tore her anterior cruciate ligament (ACL) and meniscus in her right knee which sidelined her for nine months.

=== 2012 - 2013 ===
After recovering from her knee injury, Gulini returned in 2012, scoring 2nd place at the Canyons Resort Sprint U.S. Grand Prix. On March 25, 2012, she ended in 4th place in the FIS Junior World Championship held in Sierra Nevada, Spain. With several great performances in over six World Cups in 2013, she was able to qualify for the World Cup held in the Olympic venue in Sochi, Russia where she finished in the 8th position. Three weeks later, Gulini won the 2013 Canyons Resort Sprint U.S. Grand Prix in snowboard cross with a time of 1:12.67. In the same year she was moved from the US Snowboarding Team B to the US Snowboarding Team A.

=== 2014 Winter Olympics ===
With her great performances, Gulini secured a place in the 2014 Winter Olympics held in Sochi, Russia. She competed in the snowboard cross discipline on February 16, 2014. Her seeding time was 1:23.96. In the elimination round, Gulini made it through the quarterfinals by ending 3rd in her race. Later on, she finished 3rd in the semifinals, allowing her to participate in an Olympic big final for the first time. Gulini ended in 4th place overall, which is the best Olympic placement of her career.

=== 2014 ===
Gulini's first 2014 event was the World Cup held in Andorra. A week after the 2014 Winter Olympics, she traveled to Ontario, Canada, to help coach the Oakley Progression Sessions. The event was held in the Blue Mountain Ski Resort on the first weekend of March. On April 1, 2014, Gulini traveled to Washington to assist the U.S. Olympic Committee's Best of U.S. Awards Show held on the next day at the Warner Theatre. Later that week she met President Barack Obama and the First Lady Michelle Obama at The White House.

=== 2017 ===
On December 16, 2017, Gulini rode to a second-place podium spot in snowboardcross World Cup in Montafon. It was her first ever career podium.

=== 2018 Winter Olympics ===
At the 2018 Winter Olympics in PyeongChang, South Korea, Gulini placed 21st in snowboard cross.

== Career highlights ==
=== FIS Junior World Championships ===
| Year | Location | Discipline | Place |
|---|---|---|---|
| 2010 | Cardrona, New Zealand | Snowboard Cross | 2nd |
| 2010 | Cardrona, New Zealand | Slopestyle | 10th |
| 2010 | Cardrona, New Zealand | Halfpipe | 18th |
| 2012 | Sierra Nevada, Spain | Snowboard Cross | 4th |

=== Winter Olympics ===
| Year | Location | Discipline | Place |
|---|---|---|---|
| 2010 | Vancouver, Canada | Snowboard Cross | 12th |
| 2014 | Sochi, Russia | Snowboard Cross | 4th |
| 2018 | PyeongChang, South Korea | Snowboard Cross | 21st |
| 2022 | Beijing, China | Snowboard Cross | 13th |
| 2026 | Milan Cortino, Italy | Snowboard Cross | 7th |

=== U.S. Grand Prix ===
| Year | Location | Discipline | Place |
|---|---|---|---|
| 2012 | Canyons Resort, United States | Snowboard Cross | 2nd |
| 2013 | Canyons Resort, United States | Snowboard Cross | 1st |

=== Winter X Games ===
| Season | Location | Discipline | Place |
|---|---|---|---|
| 2009 | Aspen, United States | Snowboard Cross | 10th |
| 2009 | Aspen, United States | Halfpipe | 10th |
| 2010 | Aspen, United States | Snowboard Cross | 7th |
| 2011 | Aspen, United States | Snowboard Cross | 9th |
| 2012 | Aspen, United States | Snowboard Cross | 15th |
| 2014 | Aspen, United States | Snowboard Cross | 6th |
| 2015 | Aspen, United States | Snowboard Cross | 9th |
