= Veysonnaz =

- Municipality
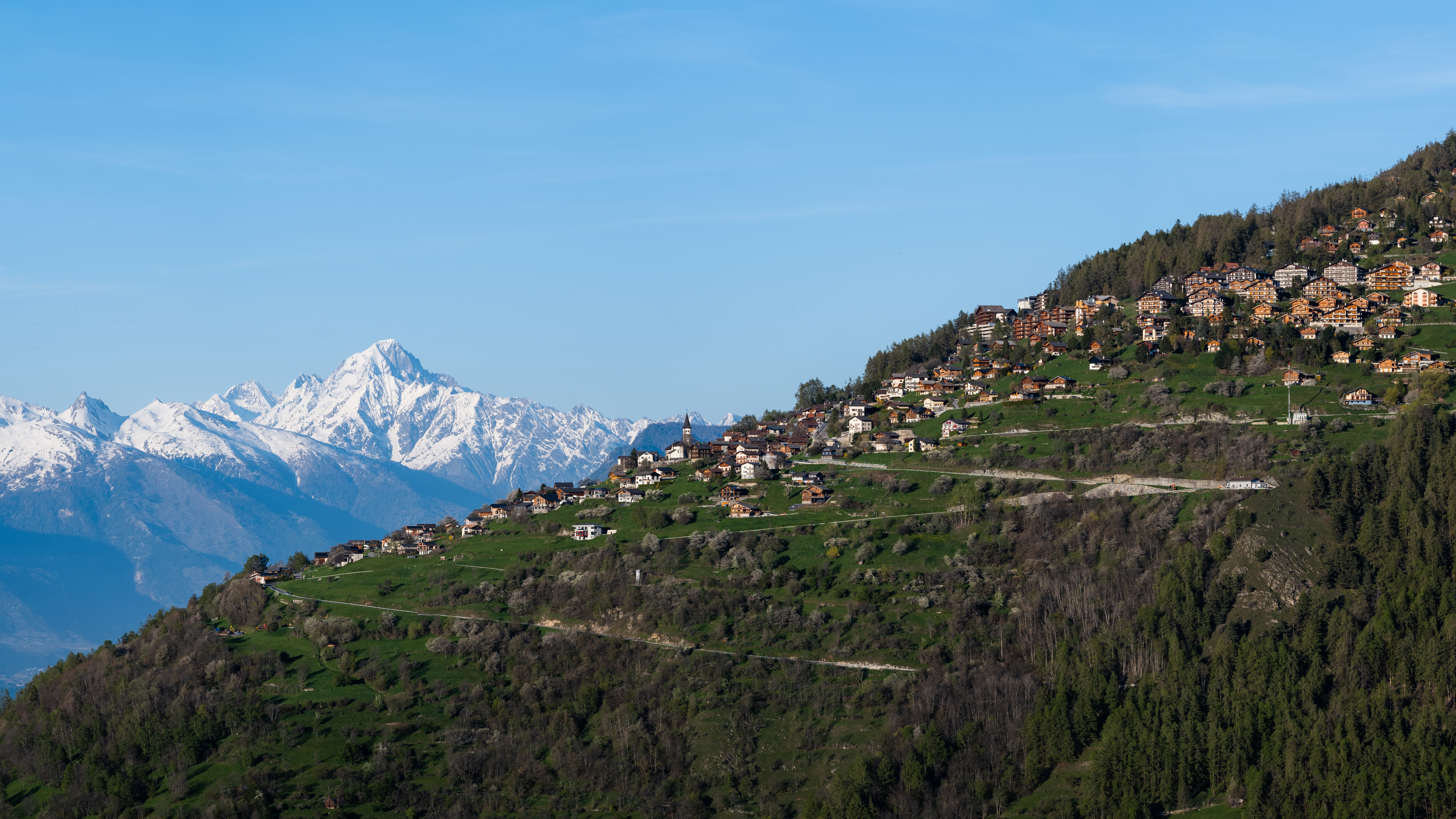
- Veysonnaz as seen from Nendaz

- Flag Coat of arms
- Location of Veysonnaz
- Location within Switzerland Location within Canton of Valais
- Coordinates: 46°11′N 7°20′E
- Country: Switzerland
- Canton: Valais
- District: Sion

Government
  - Mayor: Patrick Lathion

Area
  - Total: 1.1 km^{2} (0.42 sq mi)
- Elevation (Veysonnaz Village): 1,233 m (4,045 ft)

Population (December 2006)
  - Total: 504
  - Density: 460/km^{2} (1,200/sq mi)
- Time zone: UTC+01:00 (CET)
  - Summer (DST): UTC+02:00 (CEST)
- Postal code: 1993
- SFOS number: 6267
- ISO 3166 code: CH-VS
- Surrounded by: Nendaz, Sion
- Website: www.veysonnaz-commune.ch

Veysonnaz is a municipality in the district of Sion in the Swiss canton of Valais.

== Geography ==
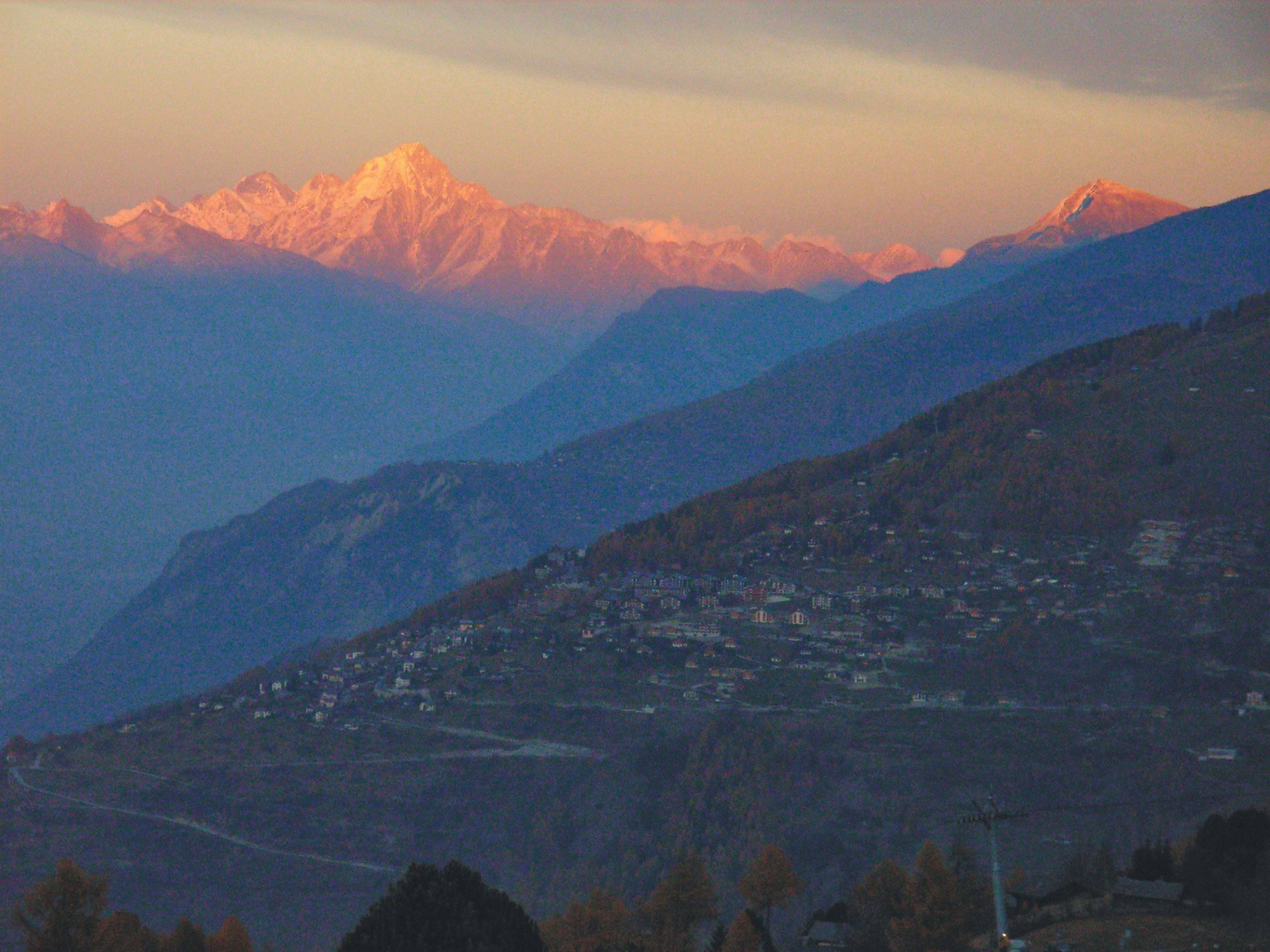
View of Veysonnaz in the evening. The Bietschhorn is in the background

Veysonnaz has an area, as of 2009, of 1.1 square kilometers (0.42 mi^{2}). Of this area, 0.32 km^{2} (0.12 mi^{2}) or 29.1% is used for agricultural purposes, while 0.49 km^{2} (0.19 mi^{2}) or 44.5% is forested. Of the rest of the land, 0.29 km^{2} (0.11 mi^{2}) or 26.4% is settled (buildings or roads) and 0.01 km^{2} (2.5 acres) or 0.9% is unproductive land.

Of the built up area, housing and buildings made up 13.6% and transportation infrastructure made up 10.0%. Power and water infrastructure as well as other special developed areas made up 1.8% of the area Out of the forested land, 34.5% of the total land area is heavily forested and 10.0% is covered with orchards or small clusters of trees. Of the agricultural land, 0.0% is used for growing crops and 26.4% is pastures, while 2.7% is used for orchards or vine crops.

== Coat of arms ==
The blazon of the municipal coat of arms is Gules, issuant from Coupeaux Vert a Pine Tree of the same trunked proper.

== Demographics ==
Veysonnaz has a population (as of December 2020) of 588. As of 2008, 14.9% of the population are resident foreign nationals. Over the last 10 years (2000–2010 ) the population has changed at a rate of 8.6%. It has changed at a rate of -0.4% due to migration and at a rate of 2.4% due to births and deaths.

Most of the population (as of 2000) speaks French (441 or 94.4%) as their first language, German is the second most common (9 or 1.9%) and Portuguese is the third (6 or 1.3%). There are 2 people who speak Italian.

As of 2008, the population was 47.6% male and 52.4% female. The population was made up of 220 Swiss men (40.4% of the population) and 39 (7.2%) non-Swiss men. There were 251 Swiss women (46.1%) and 34 (6.3%) non-Swiss women. Of the population in the municipality, 305 or about 65.3% were born in Veysonnaz and lived there in 2000. There were 74 or 15.8% who were born in the same canton, while 22 or 4.7% were born somewhere else in Switzerland, and 48 or 10.3% were born outside of Switzerland.

As of 2000, children and teenagers (0–19 years old) make up 22.3% of the population, while adults (20–64 years old) make up 62.1% and seniors (over 64 years old) make up 15.6%.

As of 2000, there were 207 people who were single and never married in the municipality. There were 218 married individuals, 28 widows or widowers and 14 individuals who are divorced.

As of 2000, there were 187 private households in the municipality, and an average of 2.4 persons per household. There were 60 households that consist of only one person and 11 households with five or more people. In 2000, a total of 177 apartments (25.9% of the total) were permanently occupied, while 490 apartments (71.7%) were seasonally occupied and 16 apartments (2.3%) were empty. As of 2009, the construction rate of new housing units was 7.4 new units per 1000 residents. The vacancy rate for the municipality, in 2010, was 1.26%.

The historical population is given in the following chart:

== Politics ==
In the 2007 federal election the most popular party was the CVP which received 60.65% of the vote. The next three most popular parties were the SP (17.39%), the SVP (8.92%) and the FDP (4.61%). In the federal election, a total of 291 votes were cast, and the voter turnout was 71.1%.

In the 2009 Conseil d'État/Staatsrat election a total of 266 votes were cast, of which 19 or about 7.1% were invalid. The voter participation was 65.0%, which is much more than the cantonal average of 54.67%. In the 2007 Swiss Council of States election a total of 289 votes were cast, of which 16 or about 5.5% were invalid. The voter participation was 72.8%, which is much more than the cantonal average of 59.88%.

== Economy ==
As of 2010, Veysonnaz had an unemployment rate of 3.4%. As of 2008, there were 22 people employed in the primary economic sector and about 10 businesses involved in this sector. 21 people were employed in the secondary sector and there were 5 businesses in this sector. 143 people were employed in the tertiary sector, with 30 businesses in this sector. There were 235 residents of the municipality who were employed in some capacity, of which females made up 42.6% of the workforce.

In 2008 the total number of full-time equivalent jobs was 139. The number of jobs in the primary sector was 7, all of which were in agriculture. The number of jobs in the secondary sector was 19, all of which were in construction. The number of jobs in the tertiary sector was 113. In the tertiary sector; 17 or 15.0% were in wholesale or retail sales or the repair of motor vehicles, 17 or 15.0% were in the movement and storage of goods, 36 or 31.9% were in a hotel or restaurant, 2 or 1.8% were the insurance or financial industry, 3 or 2.7% were technical professionals or scientists, 3 or 2.7% were in education and 1 was in health care.

In 2000, there were 65 workers who commuted into the municipality and 114 workers who commuted away. The municipality is a net exporter of workers, with about 1.8 workers leaving the municipality for every one entering. Of the working population, 6.4% used public transportation to get to work, and 74.9% used a private car.

== Religion ==
From the 2000 census, 409 or 87.6% were Roman Catholic, while 9 or 1.9% belonged to the Swiss Reformed Church. Of the rest of the population, there were 3 members of an Orthodox church (or about 0.64% of the population), and there were 8 individuals (or about 1.71% of the population) who belonged to another Christian church. There was 1 individual who was Jewish, 1 individual who was Islamic and 1 person who was Buddhist. 13 (or about 2.78% of the population) belonged to no church, are agnostic or atheist, and 26 individuals (or about 5.57% of the population) did not answer the question.

== Education ==
In Veysonnaz about 148 or (31.7%) of the population have completed non-mandatory upper secondary education, and 45 or (9.6%) have completed additional higher education (either university or a Fachhochschule). Of the 45 who completed tertiary schooling, 55.6% were Swiss men, 24.4% were Swiss women, 11.1% were non-Swiss men.

As of 2000, there were 16 students in Veysonnaz who came from another municipality, while 43 residents attended schools outside the municipality.

== Sport ==
It is most known for its winter sports, as the home of winter sports resorts and the Piste de l'Ours ("Path of the Bear") trail on which some FIS competitions, both Ski and Snowboard, take place. The last time the Alpine Ski World Cup was a guest in Veysonnaz however was in January 2004 with a replacement Downhill and Super G. The most recent races were National Championship races, FIS competitions of a lower category and Junior Championships.

It is part of the Les 4 Vallées ski area, one of the largest in the Alps, and links closely to Thyon, Haute Nendaz and Verbier.
