= Chloé Trespeuch =

French snowboarder (born 1994)

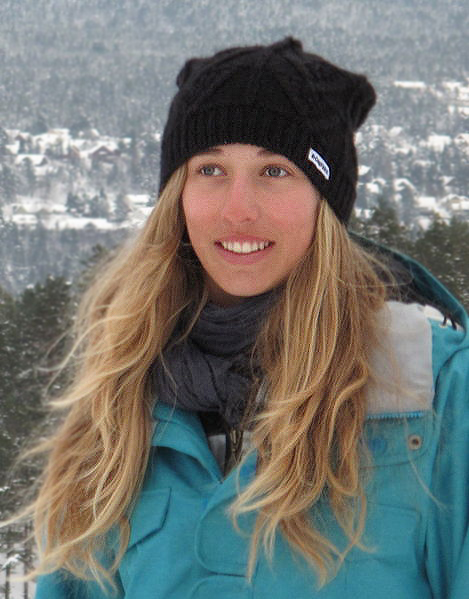

Personal information
- Born: 13 April 1994 (age 32) Bourg-Saint-Maurice, France
- Height: 1.76 m (5 ft 9 in)
Medal record
Women's snowboarding
Representing France
Olympic Games
Silver medal – second place	2022 Beijing	Snowboard cross
Bronze medal – third place	2014 Sochi	Snowboard cross
World Championships
Gold medal – first place	2017 Sierra Nevada	Team snowboard cross
Silver medal – second place	2017 Sierra Nevada	Snowboard cross
Bronze medal – third place	2023 Bakuriani	Mixed team snowboard cross
Winter Universiade
Silver medal – second place	2015 Granada	Snowboard cross
- Updated on 16 February 2014

Chloé Trespeuch (born 13 April 1994) is a French snowboarder competing in snowboard cross.

She qualified for the 2014 Winter Olympics in Sochi and won the bronze medal in the snowboard cross.

At the 2022 Winter Olympics she won the silver medal, in Women's snowboard cross.
