= FIS Snowboarding Junior World Championships =

International youth snowboarding competition

FIS Snowboarding Junior World Championships are the Junior World Championships in snowboarding organized by the International Ski Federation (FIS).

== Hosts ==
Year	Location	Country
FIS Snowboarding Junior World Championships
1997	Corno alle Scale	Italy
1998	Chamrousse	France
1999	Seiser Alm	Italy
2000	Berchtesgaden	Germany
2001	Nassfeld	Austria
2002	Rovaniemi	Finland
2003	Prato Nevoso	Italy
2004	Klínovec; Oberwiesenthal	Czech Republic; Germany
2005	Zermatt	Switzerland
2006	Vivaldi Park	South Korea
2007	Bad Gastein	Austria
2008	Chiesa in Valmalenco	Italy
2009	Nagano	Japan
2010	Otago	New Zealand
2011	Chiesa in Valmalenco	Italy
2012	Sierra Nevada	Spain
2013	Erzurum	Turkey
2014	Chiesa in Valmalenco	Italy
2015	Yabuli	China
2016	Seiser Alm; Rogla	Italy; Slovenia
2017	Klínovec and Špindlerův Mlýn; Laax	Czech Republic; Switzerland
2018	Cardrona	New Zealand
FIS Freestyle Ski and Snowboarding Junior World Championships
2019	Leysin; Rogla; Kläppen; Reiteralm	Switzerland; Slovenia; Sweden; Austria
2020	Lachtal	Austria
2021	Krasnoyarsk	Russia
2022	Leysin and Veysonnaz; Valmalenco	Switzerland; Italy
2023	Bansko; Cardrona; Passo San Pellegrino	Bulgaria; New Zealand; Italy
2024	Lachtal; Gudauri; Livigno/Mottolino	Austria; Georgia; Italy
2025	Zakopane/Suche; Isola 2000	Poland; France
2026	Calgary; Folgaria; St. Moritz	Canada; Italy; Switzerland

== Men's events ==
=== Giant slalom ===
Year	Location	Gold	Silver	Bronze
1997	(Italy) Corno alle Scale	(Austria) Lukas Grüner	(United States) Travis McLain	(France) Charlie Cosnier
1998	(France) Chamrousse	(France) Charlie Cosnier	(France) Xavier de Le Rue	(Austria) Lukas Grüner

=== Parallel giant slalom ===
Year	Location	Gold	Silver	Bronze
1999	(Italy) Seiser Alm	(France) Charlie Cosnier	(Austria) Andreas Prommegger	(Canada) Ryan Wedding
2000	(Germany) Berchtesgaden	(Austria) Andreas Prommegger	(Japan) Suguru Sasaki	(Austria) Lukas Grüner
2001	(Austria) Nassfeld	(Austria) Lukas Grüner	(Canada) Ryan Wedding	(Japan) Terumi Fujimoto
2002	(Finland) Rovaniemi	(France) François Boivin	(Italy) Rudy Galli	(Italy) Meinhard Erlacher
2003	(Italy) Prato Nevoso	(Italy) Rudy Galli	(Austria) Dominik Fiegl	(Canada) Philippe Berubé
2004	(Czech Republic) Klínovec	(Austria) Dominik Fiegl	(Japan) Hiroki Tozaki	(Austria) Benjamin Karl
2005	(Switzerland) Zermatt	(Austria) Benjamin Karl	(Slovenia) Rok Marguč	(Austria) Stefan Pletzer
2006	(South Korea) Vivaldi Park	(Russia) Alexey Zhyvayev	(Canada) Michael Lambert	(Italy) Luca Ponti
2007	(Austria) Bad Gastein	(Germany) Alexander Bergmann	(Canada) Matthew Morison	(Japan) Yuuki Nofuji
2008	(Italy) Valmalenco	(Slovenia) Jure Hafner	(Austria) Lukas Mathies	(Austria) Christoph Maltschnig
2009	(Japan) Nagano	(Bulgaria) Radoslav Yankov	(Bulgaria) Ivan Rantchev	(Slovenia) Jure Hafner
2010	(New Zealand) Otago	(Italy) Edwin Coratti	(Russia) Konstantin Shipilov	(Germany) Stefan Baumeister
2011	(Italy) Valmalenco	(Slovenia) Tim Mastnak	(Austria) Lukas Mathies	(Italy) Edwin Coratti
2012	(Spain) Sierra Nevada	(Russia) Valery Kolegov	(Russia) Dmitriy Taymulin	(Russia) Dmitriy Boyko
2013	(Turkey) Erzurum	(Austria) Daniel Krebs	(Ukraine) Oleksandr Belinskyy	(Germany) Stefan Baumeister
2014	(Italy) Valmalenco	(Russia) Valery Kolegov	(South Korea) Lee Sang-ho	(Russia) Vladislav Shkurikhin
2015	(China) Yabuli	(South Korea) Lee Sang-ho	(Switzerland) Dario Caviezel	(Russia) Dmitry Sarsembaev
2016	(Slovenia) Rogla	(Russia) Dmitry Sarsembaev	(Russia) Dmitriy Karlagachev	(Italy) Gabriel Messner
2017	(Czech Republic) Klínovec	(Russia) Dmitry Sarsembaev	(Russia) Dmitry Loginov	(Austria) Arvid Auner
2018	(New Zealand) Cardrona	(Russia) Dmitry Loginov	(Russia) Dmitriy Karlagachev	(Russia) Ilia Vitugov
2019	(Slovenia) Rogla	(Russia) Dmitry Loginov	(Germany) Elias Huber	(Russia) Iaroslav Stepanko
2020	(Austria) Lachtal	(Russia) Dmitry Loginov	(Germany) Ole Mikkel Prantl	(Canada) Arnaud Gaudet
2021	(Russia) Krasnoyarsk	(Russia) Iaroslav Stepanko	(Germany) Ole Mikkel Prantl	(Russia) Vsevolod Martynov
2022	(Italy) Valmalenco	(Canada) Ben Heldman	(Germany) Max Kühnhauser	(South Korea) Ma Jun-ho
2023	(Bulgaria) Bansko	(Bulgaria) Tervel Zamfirov	(Bulgaria) Alexander Krashniak	(Germany) Max Kühnhauser
2024	(Austria) Lachtal	(Germany) Samuel Vojtasek	(Bulgaria) Tervel Zamfirov	(Bulgaria) Petar Gergyovski
2025	(Poland) Zakopane	(Bulgaria) Tervel Zamfirov	(Italy) Tommy Rabanser	(Czech Republic) Krystof Minarik
2026	(Italy) Folgaria	(Individual Neutral Athletes) Ilia Khurtin	(United States) Walker Overstake	(Italy) Tommy Rabanser

=== Parallel slalom ===
Year	Location	Gold	Silver	Bronze
2000	(Germany) Berchtesgaden	(Austria) Andreas Prommegger	(Russia) Dimitri Vaitkous	(Germany) Raphael Geisreiter
2001	(Austria) Nassfeld	(Austria) Lukas Grüner	(Italy) Gabriel Palfrader	(Austria) Matthias Ebner
2007	(Austria) Bad Gastein	(Canada) Matthew Morison	(Austria) Daniel Leitenstorfer	(Austria) Markus Schairer
2008	(Italy) Valmalenco	(Bulgaria) Radoslav Yankov	(Italy) Christoph Mick	(Austria) Christoph Maltschnig
2009	(Japan) Nagano	(South Korea) Kim Yong-hyeon	(Russia) Andrey Sobolev	(Austria) Hanno Douschan
2010	(New Zealand) Otago	(Russia) Dmitriy Bazanov	(Italy) Edwin Coratti	(Austria) Johann Stefaner
2011	(Italy) Valmalenco	(Austria) Lukas Mathies	(Russia) Dmitriy Bazanov	(Germany) Stefan Baumeister
2012	(Spain) Sierra Nevada	(Russia) Valery Kolegov	(Germany) Christian Hupfauer	(Russia) Dmitriy Taymulin
2013	(Turkey) Erzurum	(Germany) Stefan Baumeister	(Russia) Valery Kolegov	(Canada) Indrik Trahan
2014	(Italy) Valmalenco	(Russia) Dmitriy Taymulin	(Italy) Maurizio Bormolini	(Russia) Vladislav Shkurikhin
2015	(China) Yabuli	(Russia) Vladislav Shkurikhin	(Russia) Valery Kolegov	(South Korea) Lee Sang-ho
2016	(Slovenia) Rogla	(Russia) Dmitriy Loginov	(Russia) Dmitriy Karlagachev	(Slovenia) Črt Ikovic
2017	(Czech Republic) Klínovec	(Russia) Ilia Vitugov	(Russia) Dmitriy Loginov	(Italy) Gabriel Messner
2018	(New Zealand) Cardrona	(Russia) Dmitriy Loginov	(Russia) Ilia Vitugov	(Russia) Iaroslav Stepanko
2019	(Slovenia) Rogla	(Ukraine) Mykhailo Kharuk	(Canada) Michael Nazwaski	(Canada) Jamie Behan
2020	(Austria) Lachtal	(Russia) Dmitriy Loginov	(United States) Cody Winters	(Switzerland) Gian Casanova
2021	(Russia) Krasnoyarsk	(Russia) Vsevolod Martynov	(Russia) Iaroslav Stepanko	(Russia) Vladimir Pnev
2022	(Italy) Valmalenco	(Canada) Ben Heldman	(Italy) Fabian Lantschner	(Bulgaria) Tervel Zamfirov
2023	(Bulgaria) Bansko	(Bulgaria) Petar Gergyovski	(Bulgaria) Alexander Krashniak	(Austria) Werner Pietsch
2024	(Austria) Lachtal	(Bulgaria) Kristian Georgiev	(Bulgaria) Tervel Zamfirov	(Bulgaria) Petar Gergyovski
2025	(Poland) Zakopane	(Bulgaria) Tervel Zamfirov	(Italy) Tommy Rabanser	(Italy) Mike Santuari
2026	(Italy) Folgaria	(Italy) Tommy Rabanser	(United States) Walker Overstake	(Individual Neutral Athletes) Ilia Khurtin

=== Halfpipe ===
Year	Location	Gold	Silver	Bronze
1997	(Italy) Corno alle Scale	(Sweden) Thomas Johansson	(Finland) Jussi Oksanen	(Sweden) Märten Gaimer
1998	(France) Chamrousse	(Sweden) Patrik Karlsson	(France) Jonathan Collomb-Patton	(France) Kevin Saumade
1999	(Italy) Seiser Alm	(Sweden) Hampus Mosesson	(France) Jonathan Collomb-Patton	(Norway) Espen Arvesen
2000	(Germany) Berchtesgaden	(Sweden) Anton Bergsten	(Sweden) Markus Jonsson	(Finland) Toni-Markus Turunen
2001	(Austria) Nassfeld	(Finland) Heikki Sorsa	(Sweden) John Lönnqvist	(Switzerland) Markus Keller
2002	(Finland) Rovaniemi	(United States) Steven Fischer	(Switzerland) Sergio Berger	(France) Mathieu Crepel
2003	(Italy) Prato Nevoso	(Germany) Christophe Schmidt	(United States) Tyler Emond	(France) Julien Bourguignon
2004	(Czech Republic) Klínovec	(Finland) Markus Malin	(Finland) Sami Saarenpää	(United States) Michael Goldschmidt
2005	(Switzerland) Zermatt	(Finland) Janne Korpi	(United States) Louie Vito	(Canada) Kory Wright
2006	(South Korea) Vivaldi Park	(Japan) Kōhei Kudō	(Finland) Markus Malin	(Finland) Peetu Piiroinen
2008	(Italy) Valmalenco	(Switzerland) Daniel Friberg	(Japan) Kazu’umi Fujita	(Japan) Keito Kumazaki
2009	(Japan) Nagano	(Japan) Shohto Tsutsumi	(United States) Dylan Bidez	(Finland) Ilkka-Eemeli Laari
2010	(New Zealand) Otago	(Japan) Taku Hiraoka	(Australia) Nathan Johnstone	(Italy) Manuel Pietropoli
2011	(Italy) Valmalenco	(Japan) Taku Hiraoka	(United States) Taylor Gold	(Japan) Ayumu Nedefuji
2012	(Spain) Sierra Nevada	(Slovenia) Tim-Kevin Ravnjak	(Netherlands) Dimi de Jong	(Russia) Nikita Avtaneev
2013	(Turkey) Erzurum	(Japan) Ikko Anai	(Slovenia) Tim-Kevin Ravnjak	(Switzerland) Lucien Koch
2014	(Italy) Valmalenco	(Slovenia) Tim-Kevin Ravnjak	(New Zealand) Lyon Farrell	(Switzerland) Michael Schärer
2015	(China) Yabuli	(South Korea) Kweon Lee-jun	(New Zealand) Toby Miller	(United States) Chase Blackwell
2017	(Switzerland) Laax	(South Korea) Cho Hyeon-min	(United States) Toby Miller	(United States) Chase Blackwell
2018	(New Zealand) Cardrona	(United States) Toby Miller	(Japan) Ruka Hirano	(Japan) Kaishu Hirano
2019	(Switzerland) Leysin	(Japan) Ruka Hirano	(Japan) Raio Kuchisubo	(Canada) Shawn Fair
2020	Cancelled due to the COVID-19 pandemic			
2021	(Russia) Krasnoyarsk	(Japan) Kaishu Nakagawa	(Switzerland) Jonas Hasler	(South Korea) Chaeun Lee
2022	(Switzerland) Leysin	(South Korea) Chaeun Lee	(Japan) Shuichiro Shigeno	(Switzerland) Jonas Hasler
2023	(New Zealand) Cardrona	Cancelled		
2024–2025	Not contested			
2026	(Canada) Calgary	(Japan) Konosuke Murakami	(Japan) Haku Shimasaki	(Switzerland) Mischa Zuercher

=== Snowboard cross ===
Year	Location	Gold	Silver	Bronze
2002	(Finland) Rovaniemi	(Italy) Francesco Sandrini	(Finland) Janne Keinänen	(France) François Boivin
2003	(Italy) Prato Nevoso	(Italy) Francesco Sandrini	(Italy) Luca Guerni	(United States) Thomas Parsons
2004	(Germany) Oberwiesenthal	(France) Paul-Henri de Le Rue	(Italy) Francesco Sandrini	(Austria) Markus Schairer
2005	(Switzerland) Zermatt	(France) Tony Ramoin	(Austria) Markus Schairer	(France) Pierre Vaultier
2006	(South Korea) Vivaldi Park	(Norway) Øystein Wallin	(Italy) Federico Raimo	(France) Romain Valéry
2007	(Austria) Bad Gastein	(Norway) Stian Sivertzen	(Austria) Markus Schairer	(Australia) Alex Pullin
2008	(Italy) Valmalenco	(France) David Durand	(Austria) Mathias Schöpf	(France) Tony Ramoin
2009	(Japan) Nagano	(Italy) Omar Visintin	(Austria) Michael Hämmerle	(United States) Roger Carver
2010	(New Zealand) Otago	(Russia) Nikolay Olyunin	(United States) Roger Carver	(United States) Alex Tuttle
2011	(Italy) Valmalenco	(Spain) Regino Hernández	(Slovenia) Matija Mihič	(Finland) Elias Koivumaa
2012	(Spain) Sierra Nevada	(Austria) Alessandro Hämmerle	(Australia) Jarryd Hughes	(Finland) Jussi Taka
2013	(Turkey) Erzurum	(Spain) Lucas Eguibar	(Austria) Alessandro Hämmerle	(Switzerland) Jerome Lyman
2014	(Italy) Valmalenco	(Russia) Daniil Dilman	(Spain) Lucas Eguibar	(France) Ken Vuagnoux
2015	(China) Yabuli	(Russia) Daniil Dilman	(Germany) Sebastian Pietrzykowski	(France) Ken Vuagnoux
2016	(Slovenia) Rogla	(Austria) Luca Hämmerle	(New Zealand) Duncan Campbell	(France) Vincent Dreme
2017	(Czech Republic) Klínovec	(Switzerland) Kalle Koblet	(Austria) David Pickl	(Germany) Leon Beckhaus
2018	(New Zealand) Cardrona	(United States) Jake Vedder	(Canada) Éliot Grondin	(United States) Mike Lacroix
2019	(Austria) Reiteralm	(France) Loan Bozzolo	(Canada) Éliot Grondin	(South Korea) Woo Jin
2020	Cancelled due to the COVID-19 pandemic			
2021	(Russia) Krasnoyarsk	(Canada) Éliot Grondin	(Austria) Felix Powondra	(Spain) Álvaro Romero
2022	(Switzerland) Veysonnaz	(Germany) Leon Ulbricht	(Italy) Niccolo Colturi	(Germany) Niels Conradt
2023	(Italy) Passo San Pellegrino	(Spain) Álvaro Romero	(France) Aidan Chollet	(France) Achille Leleu
2024	(Georgia (country)) Gudauri	(Germany) Leon Ulbricht	(France) Julien Tomas	(France) Aidan Chollet
2025	(France) Isola 2000	(France) Jonas Chollet	(United States) Nathan Pare	(Germany) Julius Reichle
2026	(Switzerland) St. Moritz	(Australia) Cameron Turner	(Switzerland) Kenny Schlaeppi	(Italy) Tommaso Costa

=== Big air ===
Year	Location	Gold	Silver	Bronze
2004	(Germany) Oberwiesenthal	(Finland) Pekka Ruokanen	(Austria) Hubert Fill	(United States) Shayne Pospisil
2005	(Switzerland) Zermatt	(Netherlands) Joy Geenen	(Norway) Erik-Johan Botner	(Norway) Torstein Horgmo
2006	(South Korea) Vivaldi Park	(Switzerland) Mario Käppeli	(Finland) Sami Saarenpää	(United States) Tim Humphreys
2007	(Austria) Bad Gastein	(Norway) Stian Aanestad	(Switzerland) Thomas Franc	(Norway) Kim-Rune Hansen
2008	(Italy) Valmalenco	(Finland) Petja Piiroinen	(Norway) Roger Kleivdal	(Finland) Tero Manninen
2010	(New Zealand) Otago	(Finland) Petja Piiroinen	(Belgium) Seppe Smits	(Finland) Ville Paumola
2016	(Italy) Seiser Alm	(United States) Chris Corning	(Canada) Carter Jarvis	(Canada) Francis Jobin
2017	(Czech Republic) Špindlerův Mlýn	(Japan) Yuri Okubo	(Japan) Yutaro Miyazawa	(France) Enzo Valax
2018	(New Zealand) Cardrona	(Japan) Takeru Otsuka	(United States) Luke Winkelmann	(Canada) William Buffey
2019	(Sweden) Kläppen	(Japan) Ryoma Kimata	(Japan) Aoto Kawakami	(Canada) William Buffey
2020	Cancelled due to the COVID-19 pandemic			
2021	(Russia) Krasnoyarsk	(Japan) Taiga Hasegawa	(Germany) Moritz Breu	(Russia) Igor Tarakanov
2022	(Switzerland) Leysin	(Austria) Eric Dovjak	(Japan) Taiga Hasegawa	(South Korea) Chaeun Lee
2023	(New Zealand) Cardrona	(Japan) Taiga Hasegawa	(New Zealand) Rocco Jamieson	(Italy) Ian Matteoli
2024	(Italy) Livigno/Mottolino	(New Zealand) Txema Mazet-Brown	(Switzerland) Elias Lehner	(Canada) Eli Bouchard
2025	Not contested			
2026	(Canada) Calgary	(Japan) Hakuto Kitayama	(Ukraine) Dymtro Luchkin	(Sweden) Mille Kahrstrom

=== Slopestyle ===
Year	Location	Gold	Silver	Bronze
2010	(New Zealand) Otago	(Norway) Ståle Sandbech	(Finland) Ville Paumola	(Belgium) Seppe Smits
2011	(Italy) Valmalenco	(Austria) Clemens Schattschneider	(Slovenia) Tim-Kevin Ravnjak	(Switzerland) Jan Scherrer
2012	(Spain) Sierra Nevada	(Italy) Marco Grigis	(Canada) Darcy Sharpe	(United States) Brandon Davis
2013	(Turkey) Erzurum	(Canada) Tyler Nicholson	(Switzerland) Lucien Koch	(Switzerland) Jonas Bösiger
2014	(Italy) Valmalenco	(Switzerland) Michael Schärer	(United Kingdom) Rowan Coultas	(Norway) Stian Kleivdal
2015	(China) Yabuli	(Netherlands) Erik Bastiaansen	(New Zealand) Carlos Garcia Knight	(Finland) Mikko Rehnberg
2016	(Italy) Seiser Alm	(United States) Chris Corning	(Canada) Carter Jarvis	(United States) Chandler Hunt
2017	(Czech Republic) Špindlerův Mlýn	(United States) Chris Corning	(United States) Judd Henkes	(New Zealand) Tiarn Collins
2018	(New Zealand) Cardrona	(Japan) Takeru Otsuka	(Netherlands) Niek van der Velden	(Netherlands) Casper Wolf
2019	(Sweden) Kläppen	(Canada) William Buffey	(Slovakia) Samuel Jaroš	(Japan) Rikuto Ohashi
2020	Cancelled due to the COVID-19 pandemic			
2021	(Russia) Krasnoyarsk	(Japan) Rikuto Watanabe	(Japan) Aoto Kawakami	(Netherlands) Sam Vermaat
2022	(Switzerland) Leysin	(Canada) Cameron Spalding	(New Zealand) Campbell Melville Ives	(United States) Fynn Bullock-Womble
2023	(New Zealand) Cardrona	(Japan) Taiga Hasegawa	(Canada) Cameron Spalding	(Japan) Yuto Miyamura
2024	(Italy) Livigno/Mottolino	(United States) Brooklyn DePriest	(France) Romain Allemand	(New Zealand) Rocco Jamieson
2025	Not contested			
2026	(Canada) Calgary	(Japan) Hiromu Watanabe	(United States) Colin Frans	(Ukraine) Dmytro Luchkin

=== Rail event ===
Year	Location	Gold	Silver	Bronze
2026	(Canada) Calgary	Stian Langbakk (CAN)	Pyry Posio (FIN)	Dmytro Luchkin (UKR)

== Women's events ==
=== Giant slalom ===
Year	Location	Gold	Silver	Bronze
1997	(Italy) Corno alle Scale	(France) Déborah Anthonioz	(Austria) Sabine Wutscher	(Austria) Evelyn Maier
1998	(France) Chamrousse	(France) Julie Pomagalski	(Austria) Sabine Wutscher	(Sweden) Sara Fischer

=== Parallel giant slalom ===
Year	Location	Gold	Silver	Bronze
1999	(Italy) Seiser Alm	(Austria) Nina Schlegel	(Poland) Małgorzata Kukucz	(Sweden) Sara Fischer
2000	(Germany) Berchtesgaden	(France) Julie Pomagalski	(Austria) Heidi Krings	(Austria) Nina Schlegel
2001	(Austria) Nassfeld	(Austria) Romy Pletzer	(Austria) Heidi Krings	(France) Florine Valdenaire
2002	(Finland) Rovaniemi	(Austria) Heidi Krings	(United States) Michelle Gorgone	(Italy) Marion Insam
2003	(Italy) Prato Nevoso	(Finland) Niina Sarias	(Sweden) Aprilia Hägglöf	(United States) Michelle Gorgone
2004	(Czech Republic) Klínovec	(Finland) Niina Sarias	(Germany) Amelie Kober	(Switzerland) Jasmin Seiler
2005	(Switzerland) Zermatt	(Italy) Corinna Boccacini	(Germany) Amelie Kober	(Germany) Selina Jörg
2006	(South Korea) Vivaldi Park	(Russia) Yekaterina Tudegesheva	(Germany) Isabella Laböck	(Austria) Julia Dujmovits
2007	(Austria) Bad Gastein	(Russia) Yekaterina Tudegesheva	(Bulgaria) Aleksandra Zhekova	(Poland) Karolina Sztokfisz
2008	(Italy) Valmalenco	(Norway) Hilde-Katrine Engeli	(Austria) Ina Meschik	(Russia) Alena Zavarzina
2009	(Japan) Nagano	(Austria) Sabine Schöffmann	(Switzerland) Julie Zogg	(Austria) Ina Meschik
2010	(New Zealand) Otago	(Ukraine) Annamari Chundak	(Switzerland) Julie Zogg	(Austria) Ina Meschik
2011	(Italy) Valmalenco	(Switzerland) Julie Zogg	(Switzerland) Stefanie Müller	(Germany) Cheyenne Loch
2012	(Spain) Sierra Nevada	(Switzerland) Julie Zogg	(Switzerland) Stefanie Müller	(France) Emilie Aurange
2013	(Turkey) Erzurum	(Czech Republic) Ester Ledecká	(Austria) Tanja Brugger	(Italy) Nadya Ochner
2014	(Italy) Valmalenco	(Russia) Natalia Soboleva	(France) Emilie Aurange	(Germany) Cheyenne Loch
2015	(China) Yabuli	(Russia) Natalia Soboleva	(Netherlands) Michelle Dekker	(Russia) Elizaveta Salikhova
2016	(Slovenia) Rogla	(Russia) Elizaveta Salikhova	(Italy) Elisa Profanter	(Germany) Carolin Langenhorst
2017	(Czech Republic) Klínovec	(Russia) Milena Bykova	(Austria) Daniela Ulbing	(Switzerland) Larissa Gasser
2018	(New Zealand) Cardrona	(Russia) Milena Bykova	(China) Gong Naiying	(Russia) Maria Valova
2019	(Slovenia) Rogla	(Russia) Anastasia Kurochkina	(Russia) Sofia Nadyrshina	(Italy) Jasmin Coratti
2020	(Austria) Lachtal	(Russia) Sofia Nadyrshina	(Japan) Tsubaki Miki	(Russia) Victoria Pukhova
2021	(Russia) Krasnoyarsk	(Russia) Sofia Nadyrshina	(Japan) Tsubaki Miki	(Russia) Maria Volgina
2022	(Italy) Valmalenco	(Japan) Tsubaki Miki	(South Korea) Jang Seo-hee	(Switzerland) Flurina Neva Bätschi
2023	(Bulgaria) Bansko	(Japan) Tsubaki Miki	(United States) Iris Pflum	(Germany) Salome Jansing
2024	(Austria) Lachtal	(Canada) Aurélie Moisan	(Poland) Weronika Dawidek	(Switzerland) Xenia von Siebenthal
2025	(Poland) Zakopane	(Canada) Aurélie Moisan	(Bulgaria) Malena Zamfirova	(Germany) Yuna Taniguchi
2026	(Italy) Folgaria	(Individual Neutral Athletes) Mariia Travinicheva	(Switzerland) Xenia Von Siebenthal	(Canada) Lanxi Wei

=== Parallel slalom ===
Year	Location	Gold	Silver	Bronze
2000	(Germany) Berchtesgaden	(Austria) Nina Schlegel	(France) Emmanuelle Duboc	(France) Julie Pomagalski
2001	(Austria) Nassfeld	(Switzerland) Daniela Meuli	(Austria) Heidi Krings	(Austria) Romy Pletzer
2007	(Austria) Bad Gastein	(Austria) Julia Dujmovits	(Russia) Yekaterina Tudegesheva	(Russia) Yekaterina Ilyukhina
2008	(Italy) Valmalenco	(Germany) Selina Jörg	(Norway) Hilde-Katrine Engeli	(Austria) Viktoria Stefaner
2009	(Japan) Nagano	(Switzerland) Julie Zogg	(Russia) Alena Zavarzina	(Austria) Sabine Schöffmann
2010	(New Zealand) Otago	(Austria) Sabine Schöffmann	(Switzerland) Julie Zogg	(Russia) Yekaterina Khatomchenkova
2011	(Italy) Valmalenco	(Switzerland) Julie Zogg	(Germany) Cheyenne Loch	(Austria) Sabine Schöffmann
2012	(Spain) Sierra Nevada	(Switzerland) Julie Zogg	(Switzerland) Stefanie Müller	(Germany) Cheyenne Loch
2013	(Turkey) Erzurum	(Czech Republic) Ester Ledecká	(Germany) Cheyenne Loch	(Russia) Natalia Soboleva
2014	(Italy) Valmalenco	(Russia) Natalia Soboleva	(Netherlands) Michelle Dekker	(Germany) Cheyenne Loch
2015	(China) Yabuli	(Russia) Natalia Soboleva	(South Korea) Jeong Hae-rim	(Russia) Elizaveta Salikhova
2016	(Slovenia) Rogla	(Germany) Ramona Theresia Hofmeister	(Russia) Milena Bykova	(Italy) Elisa Profanter
2017	(Czech Republic) Klínovec	(Austria) Jemima Juritz	(Russia) Maria Valova	(Austria) Daniela Ulbing
2018	(New Zealand) Cardrona	(Austria) Daniela Ulbing	(Russia) Anastasia Kurochkina	(Russia) Elena Boltaeva
2019	(Slovenia) Rogla	(Russia) Maria Valova	(Japan) Tsubaki Miki	(Russia) Anastasia Kurochkina
2020	(Austria) Lachtal	(Russia) Sofia Nadyrshina	(Japan) Tsubaki Miki	(Canada) Kaylie Buck
2021	(Russia) Krasnoyarsk	(Russia) Sofia Nadyrshina	(Russia) Maria Volgina	(Switzerland) Flurina Baetschi
2022	(Italy) Valmalenco	(Japan) Tsubaki Miki	(United States) Iris Pflum	(Austria) Pia Schöffmann
2023	(Bulgaria) Bansko	(Switzerland) Xenia von Siebenthal	(United States) Iris Pflum	(Czech Republic) Zuzana Maděrová
2024	(Austria) Lachtal	(Canada) Aurélie Moisan	(Czech Republic) Adéla Keclíková	(Austria) Marie Gams
2025	(Poland) Zakopane	(Switzerland) Xenia von Siebenthal	(Bulgaria) Malena Zamfirova	(Germany) Aurelia Buccioni
2026	(Italy) Folgaria	(Switzerland) Xenia von Siebenthal	(Individual Neutral Athletes) Mariia Travinicheva	(Germany) Zoe Jansing

=== Halfpipe ===
Year	Location	Gold	Silver	Bronze
1997	(Italy) Corno alle Scale	(Sweden) Anna Hellman	(Finland) Laura-Kaisa Suokonautio	(United States) Kim Stacey
1998	(France) Chamrousse	(Canada) Kim Dunn	(Sweden) Sophia Bergdahl	(Sweden) Sara Fischer
1999	(Italy) Seiser Alm	(Switzerland) Fabienne Reuteler	(Norway) Kjersti Buaas	(Sweden) Anna Olofsson
2000	(Germany) Berchtesgaden	(United States) Kelly Clark	(Sweden) Anna Olofsson	(Canada) Kim Dunn
2001	(Austria) Nassfeld	(Norway) Kjersti Buaas	(France) Chloé Laurent	(Japan) Eri Kokubo
2002	(Finland) Rovaniemi	(United States) Hannah Teter	(Finland) Heidi Kurkinen	(France) Audrey Achard
2003	(Italy) Prato Nevoso	(United States) Lindsey Jacobellis	(Germany) Silvia Mittermüller	(Canada) Sarah Kopinya
2004	(Czech Republic) Klínovec	(France) Sophie Rodriguez	(Poland) Paulina Ligocka	(Canada) Halley Van Muyen
2005	(Switzerland) Zermatt	(France) Sophie Rodriguez	(United States) Clair Bidez	(Switzerland) Sina Candrian
2006	(South Korea) Vivaldi Park	(United States) Clair Bidez	(United States) Ellery Hollingsworth	(Switzerland) Sina Candrian
2008	(Italy) Valmalenco	(France) Sophie Rodriguez	(United States) Kaitlyn Farrington	(Norway) Linn Haug
2009	(Japan) Nagano	(China) Cai Xuetong	(Spain) Queralt Castellet	(China) Li Shuang
2010	(New Zealand) Otago	(Slovenia) Cilka Sadar	(New Zealand) Rebecca Sinclair	(Japan) Haruna Matsumoto
2011	(Italy) Valmalenco	(Japan) Haruna Matsumoto	(Japan) Hikaru Ohe	(France) Mirabelle Thovex
2012	(Spain) Sierra Nevada	(United States) Arielle Gold	(France) Emma Bernard	(France) Lucile Lefèvre
2013	(Turkey) Erzurum	(France) Emma Bernard	(Switzerland) Verena Rohrer	(France) Lucile Lefèvre
2014	(Italy) Valmalenco	(Switzerland) Verena Rohrer	(United States) Zoe Kalapos	(Australia) Emily Arthur
2015	(China) Yabuli	(United States) Madison Taylor Barrett	(South Korea) Jeong Yu-rim	(United States) Clara Jenner
2017	(Switzerland) Laax	(Switzerland) Berenice Wicki	(United States) Anna Valentine	(Germany) Leilani Ettel
2018	(New Zealand) Cardrona	(Japan) Mitsuki Ono	(United States) Tessa Maud	(Canada) Elizabeth Hosking
2019	(Switzerland) Leysin	(Japan) Mitsuki Ono	(United States) Tessa Maud	(Germany) Leilani Ettel
2020	Cancelled due to the COVID-19 pandemic			
2021	(Russia) Krasnoyarsk	(Japan) Manon Kaji	(Switzerland) Isabelle Lötscher	(Switzerland) Elena Schütz
2022	(Switzerland) Leysin	(South Korea) Choi Ga-on	(United States) Bea Kim	(Canada) Brooke D'Hondt
2023	(New Zealand) Cardrona	Cancelled		
2024–2025	Not contested			
2026	(Canada) Calgary	(Japan) Sorana Ohashi	(Switzerland) Lura Wick	(Japan) Aiko Okada

=== Snowboard cross ===
Year	Location	Gold	Silver	Bronze
2002	(Finland) Rovaniemi	(United States) Lindsey Jacobellis	(Switzerland) Tanja Uhlmann	(Switzerland) Corinne Mottu
2003	(Italy) Prato Nevoso	(France) Morgane Fleury	(Switzerland) Sandra Frei	(Finland) Niina Sarias
2004	(Germany) Oberwiesenthal	(United States) Joanie Anderson	(Austria) Susanne Moll	(Norway) Hilde-Katrine Engeli
2005	(Switzerland) Zermatt	(France) Sophie Rodriguez	(Austria) Susanne Moll	(France) Diane Thermoz Liaudy
2006	(South Korea) Vivaldi Park	(Canada) Christelle Doyon	(Norway) Helene Olafsen	(Austria) Julia Dujmovits
2007	(Austria) Bad Gastein	(Norway) Helene Olafsen	(Bulgaria) Aleksandra Zhekova	(United States) Brooke Shaw
2008	(Italy) Valmalenco	(France) Marion Perez	(United States) Callan Chythlook-Sifsof	(United States) Brooke Shaw
2009	(Japan) Nagano	(France) Océane Pozzo	(France) Aurore Savoye	(Canada) Ziggy Cowan
2010	(New Zealand) Otago	(Czech Republic) Eva Samková	(United States) Faye Gulini	(Switzerland) Emilie Aubry
2011	(Italy) Valmalenco	(Czech Republic) Eva Samková	(France) Chloé Trespeuch	(United States) Chloe Banning
2012	(Spain) Sierra Nevada	(France) Loreleï Schmitt	(France) Charlotte Bankes	(Italy) Michela Moioli
2013	(Turkey) Erzurum	(Czech Republic) Eva Samková	(France) Chloé Trespeuch	(Italy) Michela Moioli
2014	(Italy) Valmalenco	(France) Charlotte Bankes	(France) Elisa Ravel	(France) Sarah Devouassoux
2015	(China) Yabuli	(France) Charlotte Bankes	(France) Juliette Lefèvre	(Canada) Katie Anderson
2016	(Slovenia) Rogla	(Russia) Kristina Paul	(Switzerland) Lara Casanova	(France) Manon Petit
2017	(Czech Republic) Klínovec	(Russia) Kristina Paul	(Germany) Jana Fischer	(France) Julia Pereira de Sousa Mabileau
2018	(New Zealand) Cardrona	(Russia) Kristina Paul	(United States) Livia Molodyh	(Switzerland) Sophie Hediger
2019	(Austria) Reiteralm	(Germany) Jana Fischer	(France) Chloé Passerat	(Australia) Emily Boyce
2020	Cancelled due to the COVID-19 pandemic			
2021	(Russia) Krasnoyarsk	(Czech Republic) Sára Strnadová	(France) Margaux Herpin	(Austria) Anna-Maria Galler
2022	(Switzerland) Veysonnaz	(France) Zoé Colombier	(United States) Brianna Schnorrbusch	(France) Anna Valentin
2023	(Italy) Passo San Pellegrino	(France) Léa Casta	(Australia) Josie Baff	(Germany) Celia Trinkl
2024	(Georgia (country)) Gudauri	(France) Léa Casta	(Switzerland) Noemie Wiedmer	(Italy) Lisa Francesia Boirai
2025	(France) Isola 2000	(France) Lea Casta	(Australia) Maya Billingham	(France) Lyse Laine
2026	(Switzerland) St. Moritz	(Italy) Lisa Francesia Boirai	(Switzerland) Noemie Wiedmer	(France) Fiona Caiolo Serra

=== Big air ===
Year	Location	Gold	Silver	Bronze
2004	(Germany) Oberwiesenthal	(Poland) Paulina Ligocka	(United States) Mary Sallah	(Finland) Anna Jalasti
2005	(Switzerland) Zermatt	(Switzerland) Ursina Haller	(Austria) Eva Lindbichler	(Germany) Tina Luft
2006	(South Korea) Vivaldi Park	(Switzerland) Sina Candrian	(Canada) Alexandra Duckworth	(Finland) Meri Peltonen
2007	(Austria) Bad Gastein	(Switzerland) Sina Candrian	(United States) Jordan Karlinski	(Sweden) Atti Holst
2008	(Italy) Valmalenco	(Czech Republic) Šárka Pančochová	(Norway) Helene Olafsen	(Finland) Enni Rukajärvi
2010	(New Zealand) Otago	(Finland) Enni Rukajärvi	(Slovenia) Urška Pribošič	(Slovakia) Klaudia Medlová
2016	(Italy) Seiser Alm	(Russia) Sofya Fyodorova	(United States) Nora Healey	(Canada) Océane Fillion
2017	(Czech Republic) Špindlerův Mlýn	(Australia) Tess Coady	(Japan) Reira Iwabuchi	(Finland) Elli Pikkujämsä
2018	(New Zealand) Cardrona	(Japan) Kokomo Murase	(Canada) Sommer Gendron	(China) Ren Ziyan
2019	(Sweden) Kläppen	(Canada) Sommer Gendron	(Germany) Annika Morgan	(Belgium) Evy Poppe
2020	Cancelled due to the COVID-19 pandemic			
2021	(Russia) Krasnoyarsk	(Japan) Yura Murase	(Japan) Chihiro Edamatsu	(Belgium) Evy Poppe
2022	(Switzerland) Leysin	(United Kingdom) Mia Brookes	(Japan) Chihiro Edamatsu	(Netherlands) Melissa Peperkamp
2023	(New Zealand) Cardrona	(Canada) Emeraude Maheux	(South Korea) Yu Seoung-eun	(Japan) Kiara Morii
2024	(Italy) Livigno/Mottolino	(United States) Rebecca Flynn	(Japan) Momo Suzuki	(United Kingdom) Emily Rothney
2025	Not contested			
2026	(Canada) Calgary	(Belgium) Sky Remans	(Japan) Imari Kato	(United States) Jessica Perlmutter

=== Slopestyle ===
Year	Location	Gold	Silver	Bronze
2010	(New Zealand) Otago	(Finland) Enni Rukajärvi	(Slovenia) Urška Pribošič	(Canada) Samm Denena
2011	(Italy) Valmalenco	(Hungary) Anna Gyarmati	(Finland) Merika Enne	(United States) Karly Shorr
2012	(Spain) Sierra Nevada	(Poland) Katarzyna Rusin	(United States) Indigo Monk	(Switzerland) Celia Petrig
2013	(Turkey) Erzurum	(Canada) Laurie Blouin	(France) Chloé Sillieres	(Switzerland) Celia Petrig
2014	(Italy) Valmalenco	(United States) Hailee Mattingley	(Finland) Elli Pikkujämsä	(United Kingdom) Katie Ormerod
2015	(China) Yabuli	(United States) Nora Healey	(Finland) Elli Pikkujämsä	(France) Chloé Sillieres
2016	(Italy) Seiser Alm	(France) Chloé Sillières	(Russia) Sofya Fyodorova	(United States) Nora Healey
2017	(Czech Republic) Špindlerův Mlýn	(Australia) Tess Coady	(Japan) Reira Iwabuchi	(Finland) Elli Pikkujämsä
2018	(New Zealand) Cardrona	(Japan) Kokomo Murase	(Germany) Annika Morgan	(Canada) Sommer Gendron
2019	(Sweden) Kläppen	(Canada) Sommer Gendron	(Finland) Eveliina Taka	(United States) Ty Schnorrbusch
2020	Cancelled due to the COVID-19 pandemic			
2021	(Russia) Krasnoyarsk	(Belgium) Evy Poppe	(Japan) Yura Murase	(Finland) Telma Särkipaju
2022	(Switzerland) Leysin	(Japan) Yura Murase	(United Kingdom) Mia Brookes	(Japan) Chihiro Edamatsu
2023	(New Zealand) Cardrona	(New Zealand) Lucia Georgalli	(Italy) Fanny Piantanida	(Australia) Ally Hickman
2024	(Italy) Livigno/Mottolino	(Czech Republic) Laura Záveská	(Japan) Yura Murase	(United States) Rebecca Flynn
2025	Not contested			
2026	(Canada) Calgary	(United States) Lily Dhawornvej	(Japan) Suzuka Ishimoto	(United States) Jessica Perlmutter

=== Rail event ===
Year	Location	Gold	Silver	Bronze
2026	(Canada) Calgary	(United States) Jessica Perlmutter	(Netherlands) Katja Dutu	(Germany) Marie Kuhlmann

== Mixed ==
=== Parallel team ===
Year	Location	Gold	Silver	Bronze
2019	(Slovenia) Rogla	Russia I Anastasia Kurochkina; Dmitriy Loginov	Russia III; Sofia Nadyrshina; Iaroslav Stepanko	Canada I Kaylie Buck; Arnaud Gaudet
2020	(Austria) Lachtal	Russia; Sofia Nadyrshina; Dmitriy Loginov	Japan; Tsubaki Miki; Daichi Shimizu	Russia; Victoria Pukhova; Vsevolod Martynov
2021	(Russia) Krasnoyarsk	Russia I Iaroslav Stepanko; Sofia Nadyrshina	Japan II; Naoki Kanematsu; Tsubaki Miki	Russia II; Vsevolod Martynov; Maria Volgina
2022	(Italy) Valmalenco	Japan; Shikoh Sugimoto; Tsubaki Miki	Italy I Fabian Lantschner; Elisa Fava	Germany I Max Kühnhauser; Salome Jansing
2023	(Bulgaria) Bansko	Germany I Max Kühnhauser; Salome Jansing	Switzerland I Nicola Meisser; Flurina Neva Bätschi	Czech Republic I Kryštof Minárik; Zuzana Maděrová
2024	(Austria) Lachtal	Germany I Benedikt Riel; Salome Jansing	United States I Walker Overstake; Grace Domino	Italy I Mike Santuari; Fabiana Fachin
2025	(Poland) Zakopane	Bulgaria I Tervel Zamfirov; Malena Zamfirova	Czech Republic I Kryštof Minárik; Adela Kecliková	Switzerland I Nuri Mosca; Xenia von Siebenthal
2026	(Italy) Folgaria	Czech Republic II; Ondrej Tulach; Linda Jechova	United States I Walker Overstake; Akina Kizuka	Germany I Samuel Schwerdt; Mathilda Scheid

=== Snowboard cross team ===
Year	Location	Gold	Silver	Bronze
2019	(Austria) Reiteralm	France I Loan Bozzolo; Chloé Passerat	Switzerland I Gabriel Zweifel; Sina Siegenthaler	Italy I Filippo Ferrari; Ester Gross
2020	Cancelled due to the COVID-19 pandemic			
2021	(Russia) Krasnoyarsk	Russia II; Daniil Donskikh; Valeriya Komnatnaya	France I Guillaume Herpin; Margaux Herpin	Czech Republic I Bruno Tatarko; Sára Strnadová
2022	No Team Event			
2023	(Italy) Passo San Pellegrino	Australia I James Johnstone; Josie Baff	France II; Achille Leleu; Camille Poulat	France I Aidan Chollet; Léa Casta
2024	(Georgia (country)) Gudauri	France I Julien Tomas; Léa Casta	France II; Aidan Chollet; Zoe Colombier	Slovakia I Samuel Sakal; Sara Pitonakova
2025	(France) Isola 2000	France I Jonas Chollet; Lea Casta	Australia I Cameron Turner; Maya Billingham	United States I Nathan Pare; Brianna Schnorrbusch
2026	(Switzerland) St. Moritz	Cancelled		

== Medal table ==
Updated after 2026 edition.

Rank	Nation	Gold	Silver	Bronze	Total
1	Russia	44	23	25	92
2	Japan	31	27	12	70
3	France	30	22	30	82
4	Austria	22	24	27	73
5	United States	20	36	25	81
6	Switzerland	20	24	24	68
7	Canada	18	12	24	54
8	Germany	11	16	27	54
9	Bulgaria	11	11	3	25
10	Finland	10	13	15	38
11	Italy	9	17	20	46
12	Czech Republic	9	3	5	17
13	Norway	7	6	6	19
14	South Korea	6	5	5	16
15	Slovenia	5	6	2	13
16	Sweden	5	5	7	17
17	Australia	4	5	4	13
18	Spain	3	2	1	6
19	New Zealand	2	7	2	11
20	Netherlands	2	5	3	10
21	Poland	2	3	1	6
22	Ukraine	2	2	2	6
23	Belgium	2	1	3	6
24	Individual Neutral Athletes	2	1	1	4
25	Great Britain	1	2	2	5
26	China	1	1	2	4
27	Hungary	1	0	0	1
28	Slovakia	0	1	2	3
Totals (28 entries)		280	280	280	840

== See also ==
- FIS Snowboard World Championships
- FIS Freestyle Junior World Ski Championships
