= Snowboarding at the 2026 Winter Olympics – Women's snowboard cross =

Women's snowboard cross at the XXV Olympic Winter Games
- Snowboarding
- Venue: Livigno Snow Park, Valtellina
- Date: 13 February

Medalists
1st place, gold medalist(s)		Josie Baff	Australia
2nd place, silver medalist(s)		Eva Adamczyková	Czech Republic
3rd place, bronze medalist(s)		Michela Moioli	Italy

The women's snowboard cross competition in snowboarding at the 2026 Winter Olympics was held on 13 February at the Livigno Snow Park in Valtellina. Josie Baff of Australia, the 2020 Youth Olympics champion, won the event, which became her first Olympic medal. Eva Adamczyková, the 2014 champion, won the silver medal, and Michela Moioli, the 2018 champion, bronze.

== Background ==
The 2022 champion, Lindsey Jacobellis, retired from competitions. The silver medalist, Chloé Trespeuch, qualified for the event. The bronze medalist, Meryeta O'Dine, withdrew from the Olympics because of an injury. Charlotte Bankes was leading the 2025–26 FIS Snowboard World Cup standings in snowboard cross. Michela Moioli, the 2018 Olympic champion, was the 2025 World champion.

== Results ==
=== Seeding run ===
Rank	Bib	Name	Country	Run 1	Run 2	Best
1	6	Eva Adamczyková	Czech Republic	1:12.29	–	1:12.29
2	7	Léa Casta	France	1:12.79	–	1:12.79
3	2	Noémie Wiedmer	Switzerland	1:13.12	–	1:13.12
4	13	Julia Nirani-Pereira	France	1:13.32	–	1:13.32
5	9	Chloé Trespeuch	France	1:13.49	–	1:13.49
6	11	Michela Moioli	Italy	1:13.63	–	1:13.63
7	10	Pia Zerkhold	Austria	1:14.14	–	1:14.14
8	3	Sina Siegenthaler	Switzerland	1:14.22	–	1:14.22
9	8	Charlotte Bankes	Great Britain	1:14.31	–	1:14.31
10	1	Jana Fischer	Germany	1:14.40	–	1:14.40
11	12	Mia Clift	Australia	1:14.43	–	1:14.43
12	5	Audrey McManiman	Canada	1:14.52	–	1:14.52
13	4	Stacy Gaskill	United States	1:14.60	–	1:14.60
14	19	Maja-Li Iafrate Danielsson	France	1:15.05	–	1:15.05
15	27	Hanna Percy	United States	1:15.27	–	1:15.27
16	16	Brianna Schnorrbusch	United States	1:15.29	–	1:15.29
17	14	Josie Baff	Australia	1:15.62	–	1:15.62
18	25	Sofia Groblechner	Italy	1:15.65	–	1:15.65
19	15	Aline Albrecht	Switzerland	1:15.80	–	1:15.80
20	21	Lisa Francesia Boirai	Italy	1:15.99	–	1:15.99
21	18	Faye Thelen	United States	1:16.08	1:14.62	1:14.62
22	22	Anouk Dörig	Switzerland	1:35.49	1:14.87	1:14.87
23	17	Karolína Hrůšová	Czech Republic	1:16.04	1:14.98	1:14.98
24	32	Abbey Wilson	Australia	1:16.38	1:15.03	1:15.03
25	23	Pang Chuyuan	China	1:17.98	1:16.67	1:16.67
26	20	Yongqinglamu	China	1:18.17	1:17.07	1:17.07
27	24	Kata Mandel	Romania	1:17.13	1:17.23	1:17.13
28	30	Remi Yoshida	Japan	1:17.10	1:17.42	1:17.10
29	28	Woo Su-been	South Korea	1:18.90	1:17.82	1:17.82
30	29	Mai Brit Teder	Estonia	1:18.10	1:18.47	1:18.10
31	26	Henrietta Bartalis	Romania	1:19.56	1:19.44	1:19.44
32	31	Blanca Brunner	Hungary	1:19.47	1:20.14	1:19.47

=== Elimination round ===
==== 1/8 finals ====
Heat 1

Rank	Bib	Name	Country	Notes
1	17	Josie Baff	Australia	Q
2	1	Eva Adamczyková	Czech Republic	Q
3	16	Brianna Schnorrbusch	United States	
4	32	Blanca Brunner	Hungary	

Heat 2

Rank	Bib	Name	Country	Notes
1	9	Charlotte Bankes	Great Britain	Q
2	8	Sina Siegenthaler	Switzerland	Q
3	24	Abbey Wilson	Australia	
4	25	Pang Chuyuan	China	

Heat 3

Rank	Bib	Name	Country	Notes
1	5	Chloé Trespeuch	France	Q
2	21	Faye Thelen	United States	Q
3	12	Audrey McManiman	Canada	
4	28	Remi Yoshida	Japan	

Heat 4

Rank	Bib	Name	Country	Notes
1	4	Julia Nirani-Pereira	France	Q
2	13	Stacy Gaskill	United States	Q
3	20	Lisa Francesia Boirai	Italy	
	29	Woo Su-been	South Korea	DNF

Heat 5

Rank	Bib	Name	Country	Notes
1	3	Noémie Wiedmer	Switzerland	Q
2	14	Maja-Li Iafrate Danielsson	France	Q
3	19	Aline Albrecht	Switzerland	
4	30	Mai Brit Teder	Estonia	

Heat 6

Rank	Bib	Name	Country	Notes
1	6	Michela Moioli	Italy	Q
2	11	Mia Clift	Australia	Q
3	27	Kata Mandel	Romania	
4	22	Anouk Dörig	Switzerland	

Heat 7

Rank	Bib	Name	Country	Notes
1	7	Pia Zerkhold	Austria	Q
2	10	Jana Fischer	Germany	Q
3	23	Karolína Hrůšová	Czech Republic	
4	26	Yongqinglamu	China	

Heat 8

Rank	Bib	Name	Country	Notes
1	2	Léa Casta	France	Q
2	18	Sofia Groblechner	Italy	Q
3	15	Hanna Percy	United States	
4	31	Henrietta Bartalis	Romania	

==== Quarterfinals ====
Heat 1

Rank	Bib	Name	Country	Notes
1	1	Eva Adamczyková	Czech Republic	Q
2	17	Josie Baff	Australia	Q
3	8	Sina Siegenthaler	Switzerland	
4	9	Charlotte Bankes	Great Britain	

Heat 2

Rank	Bib	Name	Country	Notes
1	4	Julia Nirani-Pereira	France	Q
2	21	Faye Thelen	United States	Q
3	5	Chloé Trespeuch	France	
4	13	Stacy Gaskill	United States	

Heat 3

Rank	Bib	Name	Country	Notes
1	6	Michela Moioli	Italy	Q
2	3	Noémie Wiedmer	Switzerland	Q
3	11	Mia Clift	Australia	
4	14	Maja-Li Iafrate Danielsson	France	

Heat 4

Rank	Bib	Name	Country	Notes
1	2	Léa Casta	France	Q
2	7	Pia Zerkhold	Austria	Q
3	10	Jana Fischer	Germany	
4	18	Sofia Groblechner	Italy	

==== Semifinals ====
Heat 1

Rank	Bib	Name	Country	Notes
1	17	Josie Baff	Australia	Q
2	1	Eva Adamczyková	Czech Republic	Q
3	21	Faye Thelen	United States	
4	4	Julia Nirani-Pereira	France	

Heat 2

Rank	Bib	Name	Country	Notes
1	6	Michela Moioli	Italy	Q
2	3	Noémie Wiedmer	Switzerland	Q
3	7	Pia Zerkhold	Austria	
4	2	Léa Casta	France	

==== Finals ====
Small final

Rank	Bib	Name	Country	Notes
5	7	Pia Zerkhold	Austria	
6	4	Julia Nirani-Pereira	France	
7	21	Faye Thelen	United States	
8	2	Léa Casta	France	

Big final

Rank	Bib	Name	Country	Notes
1st place, gold medalist(s)	17	Josie Baff	Australia	
2nd place, silver medalist(s)	1	Eva Adamczyková	Czech Republic	
3rd place, bronze medalist(s)	6	Michela Moioli	Italy	
4	3	Noémie Wiedmer	Switzerland	
