= Snowboarding at the 2024 Winter Youth Olympics =

Snowboarding at the IV Winter Youth Olympic Games
- Venue: Welli Hilli Park
- Dates: 20 January – 1 February
- Competitors: 132

Snowboarding at the 2024 Winter Youth Olympics took place from 20 January to 1 February 2024 at Welli Hilli Park, Hoengseong, South Korea.

== Schedule ==
All times are in KST (UTC+9)

Date	Time	Event
20 January	11:00	Men's/Women's snowboard cross
21 January	10:45	Mixed team snowboard cross
24 January	09:45	Women's slopestyle
25 January	09:45	Men's slopestyle
27 January	10:15	Men's/Women's big air qualification
28 January	10:15	Men's/Women's big air
1 February	10:15	Men's/Women's halfpipe

== Medal summary ==
=== Medal table ===
* Host nation (South Korea)

Rank	Nation	Gold	Silver	Bronze	Total
1	France	2	2	2	6
2	Japan	2	1	1	4
3	South Korea*	2	0	0	2
4	Canada	1	2	0	3
5	Switzerland	1	0	1	2
6	Austria	1	0	0	1
7	United States	0	3	0	3
8	New Zealand	0	1	2	3
9	Australia	0	0	1	1
9	Brazil	0	0	1	1
9	Czech Republic	0	0	1	1
Totals (11 entries)		9	9	9	27

=== Medalists ===
==== Men's events ====
Event	Gold		Silver		Bronze	
Big air	Eli Bouchard; Canada	183.25	Oliver Martin; United States	179.50	Campbell Melville Ives; New Zealand	153.00
Halfpipe	Lee Chae-un; South Korea	88.50	Alessandro Barbieri; United States	84.75	Ryusei Yamada; Japan	83.00
Slopestyle	Lee Chae-un; South Korea	96.00	Eli Bouchard; Canada	90.00	Romain Allemand; France	89.25
Snowboard cross	Jonas Chollet; France		Anthony Shelly; Canada		Zion Bethônico; Brazil	

==== Women's events ====
Event	Gold		Silver		Bronze	
Big air	Yura Murase; Japan	154.25	Rebecca Flynn; United States	153.00	Lucia Georgalli; New Zealand	152.00
Halfpipe	Rise Kudo; Japan	90.75	Sara Shimizu; Japan	84.50	Lura Wick; Switzerland	78.00
Slopestyle	Hanna Karrer; Austria	89.00	Lucia Georgalli; New Zealand	88.25	Vanessa Volopichová; Czech Republic	87.00
Snowboard cross	Noémie Wiedmer; Switzerland		Maja-Li Iafrate Danielsson; France		Léa Casta; France	

==== Mixed events ====
Event	Gold	Silver	Bronze
Team snowboard cross	France; Jonas Chollet; Léa Casta	France; Benjamin Niel; Maja-Li Iafrate Danielsson	Australia; William Martin; Abbey Wilson

== Qualification ==
NOCs can gain quota places per gender via the 2023 FIS Snowboarding Junior World Ski Championships. Furthermore, the remaining NOCs would get quota places via the YOG FIS points' lists as of 18 December 2023.

=== Summary ===
This is the quota list as of December 18, 2023.

NOC	Boys			Girls			Total
NOC	HP	SS/BA	SX	HP	SS/BA	SX	Total
Andorra			~~1~~ 0				0
Argentina			~~1~~ 0				0
Australia	1	1	2	2	2	2	10
Austria			2	~~1~~ 0	1	~~2~~ 0	3
Brazil	1	~~2~~ 0	1				2
Bulgaria			1			1	2
Canada	~~1~~ 0	2	2	2	2	2	10
Chile		1			~~1~~ 0		1
China	2	1		2	1		6
Czech Republic			2		1	2	5
Denmark	~~1~~ 0						0
Estonia					2	1	3
Finland		1					1
France		2	2			2	6
Germany	~~1~~ 0		2	2		~~2~~ 1	5
Great Britain	1	1					2
Greece					1		1
Hungary			1			1	2
Iceland		1			1		2
Italy		2	2		~~2~~ 0	2	6
Japan	2	~~2~~ 0	1	2	2	~~2~~ 1	8
Netherlands			~~1~~ 0		2	1	3
New Zealand	1	2		~~1~~ 0	2		5
Norway		1				~~1~~ 0	1
Romania			1			1	2
Slovakia		1	1			1	3
Slovenia	1	1					2
South Korea	2	2	2	2	2	~~2~~ 1	11
Spain			~~2~~ 1			1	2
Switzerland	2	1	2	1	1	2	9
Ukraine			1				1
United Arab Emirates					1		1
United States	2	2	2	2	2	2	12
Total: 30 NOCs	15	22	28	15	22	24	126

=== Next eligible NOC per event ===
A country can be eligible for more than one quota spot per event in the reallocation process. Bolded NOCs have accepted quotas while NOCs with a strike through have already passed.

Girls

Halfpipe	Slopestyle/Big Air	Snowboard Cross
**Canada**; ~~Switzerland~~; ~~New Zealand~~	~~Germany~~; ~~Great Britain~~; **Austria**; ~~France~~; ~~Argentina~~; ~~Sweden~~; **Iceland**; ~~Spain~~; ~~Serbia~~; ~~Croatia~~; ~~Andorra~~; **Greece**; ~~Lithuania~~; ~~Finland~~; ~~Norway~~; ~~Poland~~; **Estonia**	**Netherlands**; ~~Andorra~~; **Switzerland**; ~~Spain~~; ~~Netherlands~~; ~~Andorra~~

Boys

Halfpipe	Slopestyle/Big Air	Snowboard Cross
**Switzerland**; **China**; ~~Great Britain~~; ~~Australia~~; ~~New Zealand~~	**Chile**; **China**; ~~Germany~~; ~~Netherlands~~; **Slovenia**; ~~Belgium~~; ~~Poland~~; **Iceland**	**Slovakia**; **Bulgaria**; ~~Great Britain~~; **Hungary**; **Switzerland**
