= France at the 2024 Winter Youth Olympics =

- Flag of France
- IOC code: FRA
- NOC: French Olympic Committee

in Gangwon, South Korea 19 January 2024 – 1 February 2024
- Competitors: 65 in 12 sports
- Flag bearers (opening): Frank Tekam & Lea Casta
- Flag bearer (closing): TBD
- Medals Ranked 4th: Gold 7 Silver 5 Bronze 6 Total 18

Winter Youth Olympics appearances
- 2012; 2016; 2020; 2024

France competed at the 2024 Winter Youth Olympics in Gangwon, South Korea, from 19 January to 1 February 2024. This was France's fourth appearance at the Winter Youth Olympic Games, having competed at every Games since the inaugural edition in 2012.

Short track speed skater Frank Tekam and snowboarder Lea Casta were the country's flagbearers during the opening ceremony.

== Competitors ==
The following is the list of number of competitors (per gender) participating at the games per sport/discipline.

Sport	Men	Women	Total
Alpine skiing	3	3	6
Biathlon	4	4	8
Bobsleigh	1	0	1
Cross-country	3	3	6
Figure skating	2	2	4
Freestyle skiing	2	2	4
Ice hockey	0	18	18
Luge	0	1	1
Nordic combined	2	2	4
Short track speed skating	2	1	3
Ski jumping	2	2	4
Snowboarding	4	2	6
Total	25	40	65

== Medalists ==
Medal	Name	Sport	Event	Date
Gold	Jonas Chollet	Snowboarding	Men's snowboard cross	20 January
Gold	Antonin Guy	Biathlon	Men's individual	20 January
Gold	Antonin Guy; Alice Dusserre	Biathlon	Single mixed relay	21 January
Gold	Jonas Chollet; Léa Casta	Snowboarding	Mixed team snowboard cross	21 January
Gold	Antonin Guy	Biathlon	Men's sprint	23 January
Gold	Nash Huot-Marchand	Alpine skiing	Men's giant slalom	24 January
Gold	Ambre Perrier Gianesini; Samuel Blanc Klaperman	Figure skating	Ice dance	30 January
Silver	Maja-Li Iafrate Danielsson	Snowboarding	Women's snowboard cross	20 January
Silver	Benjamin Niel; Maja-Li Iafrate Danielsson	Snowboarding	Mixed team snowboard cross	21 January
Silver	Alice Dusserre; Louise Roguet; Flavio Guy; Antonin Guy	Biathlon	Mixed relay	24 January
Silver	Agathe Margreither	Cross-country skiing	Women's 7.5 km classical	30 January
Silver	Agathe Margreither; Gaspard Cottaz; Annette Coupat; Quentin Lespine	Cross-country skiing	4 × 5 kilometres mixed relay	1 February
Bronze	Léa Casta	Snowboarding	Women's snowboard cross	20 January
Bronze	Flavio Guy	Biathlon	Men's sprint	23 January
Bronze	Nash Huot-Marchand	Alpine skiing	Men's slalom	25 January
Bronze	Romain Allemand	Snowboarding	Men's slopestyle	25 January
Bronze	Annette Coupat	Cross-country skiing	Women's 7.5 km classical	30 January
Bronze	Quentin Lespine	Cross-country skiing	Men's 7.5 km classical	30 January

== Alpine skiing ==
France qualified six alpine skiers (three per gender).

Men

Athlete	Event	Run 1		Run 2		Total	
Athlete	Event	Time	Rank	Time	Rank	Time	Rank
Nash Huot-Marchand	Super-G	—N/a				57.07	33
Nash Huot-Marchand	Giant slalom	48.88	2	45.49	1	1:34.37	1st place, gold medalist(s)
Nash Huot-Marchand	Slalom	47.14	4	51.73	1	1:38.87	3rd place, bronze medalist(s)
Nash Huot-Marchand	Combined	54.68	5	56.05	13	1:50.73	8
Zacchaeus Poulsen	Super-G	—N/a				55.95	22
Zacchaeus Poulsen	Giant slalom	50.93	18	46.32	9	1:37.25	9
Zacchaeus Poulsen	Slalom	48.26	11	Did not finish			
Zacchaeus Poulsen	Combined	55.36	12	55.85	11	1:51.21	13
Romeo Rogue	Super-G	—N/a				55.20	11
Romeo Rogue	Giant slalom	50.66	14	46.69	15	1:37.35	12
Romeo Rogue	Slalom	48.64	19	Did not finish			
Romeo Rogue	Combined	55.69	16	Did not finish			

Women

Athlete	Event	Run 1		Run 2		Total	
Athlete	Event	Time	Rank	Time	Rank	Time	Rank
Lola Blanc	Super-G	—N/a				56.52	28
Lola Blanc	Giant slalom	50.17	14	Did not finish			
Lola Blanc	Slalom	53.00	24	50.30	19	1:43.30	20
Lola Blanc	Combined	57.92	15	Did not finish			
Leontine Curdy	Super-G	—N/a				54.37	9
Leontine Curdy	Giant slalom	Did not finish					
Leontine Curdy	Slalom	54.56	30	Did not finish			
Leontine Curdy	Combined	57.09	9	Did not finish			
Sara Testut-G'Styr	Super-G	—N/a				54.38	10
Sara Testut-G'Styr	Giant slalom	50.53	17	54.18	12	1:44.71	14
Sara Testut-G'Styr	Slalom	52.48	20	49.65	16	1:42.13	17
Sara Testut-G'Styr	Combined	58.20	18	53.53	17	1:51.73	17

Mixed

Athlete	Event	Round of 16	Quarterfinals	Semifinals	Final / BM	
Athlete	Event	Opposition Result	Opposition Result	Opposition Result	Opposition Result	Rank
Sara Testut-G'Styr; Nash Huot-Marchand	Parallel mixed team	Canada; W 3–1	Sweden; L 2–2*	Did not advance		

== Biathlon ==
Men

Athlete	Event	Time	Misses	Rank
Antonin Guy	Sprint	20:57.7	1 (0+1)	1st place, gold medalist(s)
Antonin Guy	Individual	41:45.2	3 (1+1+0+1)	1st place, gold medalist(s)
Flavio Guy	Sprint	21:55.2	4 (3+1)	3rd place, bronze medalist(s)
Flavio Guy	Individual	45:48.4	9 (2+2+1+4)	21
Camille Grataloup Manissolle	Sprint	21:59.5	2 (1+1)	4
Camille Grataloup Manissolle	Individual	44:49.1	7 (0+2+2+3)	14
Clément Pirès	Sprint	23:42.2	5 (2+3)	25
Clément Pirès	Individual	44:14.4	5 (3+0+2+0)	11

Women

Athlete	Event	Time	Misses	Rank
Lola Bugeaud	Sprint	23:09.7	7 (4+3)	34
Lola Bugeaud	Individual	41:08.3	6 (0+2+1+3)	20
Alice Dusserre	Sprint	21:52.2	2 (1+1)	17
Alice Dusserre	Individual	39:09.5	3 (2+1+0+0)	7
Léna Moretti	Sprint	22:33.9	3 (0+3)	28
Léna Moretti	Individual	43:20.6	7 (3+1+2+1)	34
Louise Roguet	Sprint	28:37.5	9 (4+5)	79
Louise Roguet	Individual	39:37.6	4 (0+3+0+1)	10

Mixed

Athletes	Event	Time	Misses	Rank
Antonin Guy; Alice Dusserre	Single mixed relay	44:08.2	0+5	1st place, gold medalist(s)
Alice Dusserre; Louise Roguet; Flavio Guy; Antonin Guy	Mixed relay	1:16:25.4	2+13	2nd place, silver medalist(s)

== Bobsleigh ==
France qualified one male bobsledder.

Athlete	Event	Run 1		Run 2		Total	
Athlete	Event	Time	Rank	Time	Rank	Time	Rank
Ivan Boteff-Wallace	Men's monobob	56.03	13	56.20	12	1:52.23	14

== Cross-country skiing ==
France qualified six cross-country skiers (three per gender).

Men

Athlete	Event	Qualification		Quarterfinal		Semifinal		Final	
Athlete	Event	Time	Rank	Time	Rank	Time	Rank	Time	Rank
Johan Calandry	7.5 km classical	—N/a						20:55.1	23
Johan Calandry	Sprint freestyle	3:09.45	18 Q	3:08.47	5	Did not advance			
Gaspard Cottaz	7.5 km classical	—N/a						20:09.5	4
Gaspard Cottaz	Sprint freestyle	3:13.48	29 Q	3:04.83	3 LL	3:10.49	6	Did not advance	
Quentin Lespine	7.5 km classical	—N/a						19:54.1	3rd place, bronze medalist(s)
Quentin Lespine	Sprint freestyle	3:06.39	7 Q	3:08.83	2 Q	3:10.09	5	Did not advance	

Women

Athlete	Event	Qualification		Quarterfinal		Semifinal		Final	
Athlete	Event	Time	Rank	Time	Rank	Time	Rank	Time	Rank
Annette Coupat	7.5 km classical	—N/a						22:32.3	3rd place, bronze medalist(s)
Annette Coupat	Sprint freestyle	3:32.31	5 Q	3:40.16	1 Q	3:39.12	3	Did not advance	
Lina Levet	7.5 km classical	—N/a						24:12.3	27
Lina Levet	Sprint freestyle	3:38.22	10 Q	3:44.54	5	Did not advance			
Agathe Margreither	7.5 km classical	—N/a						22:30.1	2nd place, silver medalist(s)
Agathe Margreither	Sprint freestyle	3:39.86	16 Q	3:41.52	3	Did not advance			

Mixed

Athlete	Event	Time	Rank
Agathe Margreither; Gaspard Cottaz; Annette Coupat; Quentin Lespine	Mixed relay	53:13.0	2nd place, silver medalist(s)

== Figure skating ==
Athlete	Event	SP/SD		FS/FD		Total	
Athlete	Event	Points	Rank	Points	Rank	Points	Rank
Gianni Motilla	Men's singles	51.79	17	104.47	15	156.26	15
Eve Dubecq	Women's singles	47.69	13	80.48	15	128.17	15
Ambre Perrier-Gianesini; Samuel Blanc-Klaperman	Ice dance	62.39	1	92.96	1	155.35	1st place, gold medalist(s)

Team event

Athlete	Event	Free skate / Free dance				Total	
Athlete	Event	Men's	Women's	Pairs	Ice dance	Points	Rank
Athlete	Event	Points Team points	Points Team points	Points Team points	Points Team points	Points	Rank
Gianni Motilla (M); Eve Dubecq (W); Ambre Perrier-Gianesini / Samuel Blanc-Klaperman (ID)	Team event	94.10; 1	87.70; 1	–	97.69; 5	7	5

== Freestyle skiing ==
Dual moguls
Individual

Athlete	Event	Group Stage						Semifinals	Final / BM	
Athlete	Event	Opposition Result	Opposition Result	Opposition Result	Opposition Result	Points	Rank	Opposition Result	Opposition Result	Rank
Paul Andrea Gay	Men's dual moguls	Moberg (SWE); L 2–3	Verdaguer Forn (ESP); L 2–3	Cohen (USA); L 2–3	Zvalený (CZE); DNF 1–3	7	5	Did not advance		
Lily Joly	Women's dual moguls	Lodge (AUS); W 3–2	Sakai (JPN); L 2–3	Feklistova (KAZ); L 2–3	Kisil (UKR); W 3–2	10	4	Did not advance		

Team

Athlete	Event	Round of 16	Quarterfinals	Semifinals	Final / BM	
Athlete	Event	Opposition Result	Opposition Result	Opposition Result	Opposition Result	Rank
Lily Joly; Paul Andrea Gay	Mixed team	Feklistova / Rastruba (KAZ); W 50–20	McLarnon / Cohen (USA); L 31–39	Did not advance		

Halfpipe, Slopestyle & Big Air

Athlete	Event	Qualification				Final				
Athlete	Event	Run 1	Run 2	Best	Rank	Run 1	Run 2	Run 3	Best	Rank
Timothé Roch	Men's big air	64.00	17.25	64.00	15	Did not advance				
Timothé Roch	Men's slopestyle	35.00	61.50	61.50	12	Did not advance				
Honey Smith	Women's big air	Did not start				Did not advance				
Honey Smith	Women's slopestyle	17.50	55.25	55.25	11	Did not advance				

== Ice hockey ==
France qualified a team of eighteen ice hockey players for the women's six-team tournament.

Roster

Marion Allemoz served as head coach, Sébastien Roujon and Alisson Obré were assistant coaches, and Christophe Renard was goalkeeper coach.

- Chloé Bened
- Clémence Boudin – C
- Alice Chevrier
- Camille Cunin-Hogly
- Isabella De Gaulmyn
- Manon Demessine – A
- Emy Denis
- Agathe Eitenschenck
- Victoria Falco
- Louna Ivaldy
- Maëli Moussier
- Lysa Nogaretto
- Jeanne Paul-Constant
- Louison Pastre
- Maéli Raigneau
- Domitille Ratto
- Maeva Sadoun – A
- Maud Tessier Maniere

Summary

Key:

- GWS – Game winning shots
- E – Eliminated

Team	Event	Group stage			Semifinal	Final	
Team	Event	Opponent Score	Opponent Score	Rank	Opponent Score	Opponent Score	Rank
France	Women's tournament	Switzerland; L 0–2	Germany; L 0–4	E	Did not advance		5

=== Women's tournament ===
Group B

Pos	Team	Pld	W	SOW	SOL	L	GF	GA	GD	Pts	Qualification
1	Switzerland	2	2	0	0	0	4	1	+3	6	Semifinals
2	Germany	2	1	0	0	1	5	2	+3	3	Semifinals
3	France	2	0	0	0	2	0	6	−6	0	

Source: IOC

27 January 2024; 17:00	France	0–2 (0–1, 0–0, 0–1)	Switzerland	Gangneung Hockey Centre; Attendance: 1,742

Game reference
Louna Ivaldy	Goalies	Valentina Camenzind	Referees: (Mexico) María Chávez (Canada) Beatrice Fortin; Linesmen: (Switzerland) Domenica Maurer (United States) Laura Schmidlein
0–1 / 13:20 – Tschannen (SH); 0–2 / 36:43 – Müller			Referees: (Mexico) María Chávez (Canada) Beatrice Fortin; Linesmen: (Switzerland) Domenica Maurer (United States) Laura Schmidlein
3 min	Penalties	3 min	Referees: (Mexico) María Chávez (Canada) Beatrice Fortin; Linesmen: (Switzerland) Domenica Maurer (United States) Laura Schmidlein
13	Shots	29	Referees: (Mexico) María Chávez (Canada) Beatrice Fortin; Linesmen: (Switzerland) Domenica Maurer (United States) Laura Schmidlein

28 January 2024; 17:00	Germany	4–0 (1–0, 3–0, 0–0)	France	Gangneung Hockey Centre; Attendance: 1,391

Game reference

Hanna Bugl
Goalies
Louna Ivaldy
Lysa Nogaretto
Referees:
(United States) Maria Gherardi
(Malaysia) Wan Mei Wah
Linesmen:
(Germany) Lara Fischer
(Switzerland) Domenica Maurer

Wintgen – 13:00	1–0
Weichenhain (Birka) – 18:54	2–0
Heine (Pfalz, Poindl) – 26:37	3–0
Mayr (Wintgen, Weichenhain) – 29:44	4–0

1.5 min
Penalties
7.5 min
32
Shots
15

== Luge ==
France qualified one female luger, Thiméa Ginet.

Women

Athlete	Event	Run 1		Run 2		Total	
Athlete	Event	Time	Rank	Time	Rank	Time	Rank
Thiméa Ginet	Singles	50.253	21	50.364	23	1:40.617	24

== Nordic combined ==
Individual

Athlete	Event	Ski jumping				Cross-country	
Athlete	Event	Distance	Points	Rank	Deficit	Time	Rank
Luc Balland	Men's normal hill/6 km	95.5	109.8	12	+2:05	16:07.8	16
Lubin Martin	Men's normal hill/6 km	88.5	89.5	22	+3:26	16:12.6	17
Romane Baud	Women's normal hill/4 km	94.5	110.3	6	+1:32	12:25.7	8
Marion Droz Vincent	Women's normal hill/4 km	86.5	96.8	12	+2:26	13:14.3	12

Team

Athlete	Event	Ski jumping			Cross-country	
Athlete	Event	Points	Rank	Deficit	Time	Rank
Romane Baud; Luc Balland; Lubin Martin; Marion Droz Vincent	Mixed team	394.3	7	+0:54	35:42.3	6

== Short track speed skating ==
Men

Athlete	Event	Heats		Quarterfinal		Semifinal		Final	
Athlete	Event	Time	Rank	Time	Rank	Time	Rank	Time	Rank
Tymeo Libeau	500 m	43.576	3	Did not advance					
Tymeo Libeau	1000 m	1:50.737	3 ADV	1:29.743	5	Did not advance			
Tymeo Libeau	1500 m	—N/a		2:31.613	5	Did not advance			
Franck Tekam	500 m	42.503	2 Q	42.869	3	Did not advance			
Franck Tekam	1000 m	1:37.562	2 Q	1:30.844	3	Did not advance			
Franck Tekam	1500 m	—N/a		2:25.920	4	Did not advance			

Women

Athlete	Event	Heats		Quarterfinal		Semifinal		Final	
Athlete	Event	Time	Rank	Time	Rank	Time	Rank	Time	Rank
Maiwenn Langevin	500 m	47.377	3	Did not advance					
Maiwenn Langevin	1000 m	1:38.924	3	Did not advance					
Maiwenn Langevin	1500 m	—N/a		2:35.484	5	Did not advance			

== Ski jumping ==
France qualified four ski jumpers (two per gender).

Individual

Athlete	Event	First round			Final			Total	
Athlete	Event	Distance	Points	Rank	Distance	Points	Rank	Points	Rank
Mathéo Vernier	Men's normal hill	82.5	63.8	28	88.0	70.7	21	134.5	25
Sébastien Woodbridge	Men's normal hill	87.0	71.5	23	92.0	80.5	17	152.0	18
Mathilde Bacconnier	Women's normal hill	69.5	30.9	24	73.5	39.8	24	70.7	25
Lilou Zepchi	Women's normal hill	90.5	82.0	9	95.5	89.7	9	171.7	10

Team

Athlete	Event	First round				Final				Total	
Athlete	Event	Distance	Points	Team points	Rank	Distance	Points	Team points	Rank	Points	Rank
Mathilde Bacconnier; Mathéo Vernier; Lilou Zepchi; Sébastien Woodbridge	Mixed team	80.5; 89.5; 92.0; 86.0	55.2; 77.0; 84.3; 76.6	293.1	10	73.0; 81.5; 91.5; 87.0	51.0; 71.3; 83.3; 79.6	285.2	11	578.3	11

== Snowboarding ==
Snowboard cross
Individual

Athlete	Event	Group heats		Semifinal	Final
Athlete	Event	Points	Rank	Rank	Rank
Jonas Chollet	Men's snowboard cross	19	1 Q	1 FA	1st place, gold medalist(s)
Benjamin Niel	Men's snowboard cross	19	2 Q	3 FB	6
Léa Casta	Women's snowboard cross	20	1 Q	1 FA	3rd place, bronze medalist(s)
Maja-Li Iafrate Danielsson	Women's snowboard cross	18	2 Q	2 FA	2nd place, silver medalist(s)

Mixed

Athlete	Event	Pre-heats	Quarterfinal	Semifinal	Final
Athlete	Event	Position	Position	Position	Position
Jonas Chollet; Léa Casta	Team snowboard cross	—N/a	1 Q	1 FA	1st place, gold medalist(s)
Benjamin Niel; Maja-Li Iafrate Danielsson	Team snowboard cross	—N/a	1 Q	1 FA	2nd place, silver medalist(s)

Halfpipe, Slopestyle & Big Air

Athlete	Event	Qualification				Final				
Athlete	Event	Run 1	Run 2	Best	Rank	Run 1	Run 2	Run 3	Best	Rank
Romain Allemand	Men's slopestyle	71.25	40.50	71.25	4 Q	85.50	89.25	34.25	89.25	3rd place, bronze medalist(s)
Romain Allemand	Men's big air	85.75	89.25	89.25	3 Q	23.75	24.50	94.75	94.75	7
Luca Mérimée-Mantovani	Men's slopestyle	36.00	5.50	36.00	13	Did not advance				
Luca Mérimée-Mantovani	Men's big air	90.50	24.25	90.50	2 Q	76.00	48.50	31.50	124.50	4

== See also ==
- France at the 2024 Summer Olympics
