= FIS Freestyle Ski and Snowboarding World Championships 2025 – Women's snowboard cross =

Women's snowboard cross at the FIS Freestyle Ski and Snowboarding World Championships 2025
- Location: Corvatsch, Switzerland
- Date: 27 March (qualification); 28 March (final)
- Competitors: 30

Medalists
| gold medal | Michela Moioli | Italy |
| silver medal | Charlotte Bankes | Great Britain |
| bronze medal | Julia Pereira de Sousa Mabileau | France |

The Women's snowboard cross competition at the FIS Freestyle Ski and Snowboarding World Championships 2025 was held on 27 and 28 March 2025.

== Qualification ==
| Rank | Bib | Name | Country | Run 1 | Run 2 | Notes |
|---|---|---|---|---|---|---|
| 1 | 8 | Sina Siegenthaler | Switzerland | 1:07.05 | | Q |
| 2 | 1 | Michela Moioli | Italy | 1:07.26 | | Q |
| 3 | 2 | Julia Pereira de Sousa Mabileau | France | 1:07.27 | | Q |
| 4 | 7 | Charlotte Bankes | United Kingdom | 1:07.55 | | Q |
| 5 | 4 | Léa Casta | France | 1:07.87 | | Q |
| 6 | 11 | Mia Clift | Australia | 1:07.94 | | Q |
| 7 | 9 | Chloe Trespeuch | France | 1:07.98 | | Q |
| 8 | 13 | Meryeta Odine | Canada | 1:08.10 | | Q |
| 9 | 10 | Noemie Wiedmer | Switzerland | 1:08.14 | | Q |
| 10 | 3 | Josie Baff | Australia | 1:08.32 | | Q |
| 11 | 15 | Audrey McManiman | Canada | 1:08.86 | 1:08.28 | Q |
| 12 | 16 | Brianna Schnorrbusch | United States | 1:09.03 | 1:08.66 | Q |
| 13 | 17 | Karolína Hrušová | Czech Republic | 1:09.18 | 1:08.99 | Q |
| 14 | 6 | Manon Petit-Lenoir | France | 1:08.92 | 1:09.09 | Q |
| 15 | 19 | Tess Critchlow | Canada | 1:08.45 | 1:09.40 | Q |
| 16 | 26 | Acy Craig | United States | 1:10.50 | 1:09.40 | Q |
| 17 | 12 | Jana Fischer | Germany | 1:09.38 | 1:09.63 | |
| 18 | 29 | Madeline Lochte-Bono | United States | 1:10.93 | 1:09.72 | |
| 19 | 14 | Aline Albrecht | Switzerland | 1:08.99 | 1:09.81 | |
| 20 | 5 | Pia Zerkhold | Austria | 1:09.40 | 1:10.06 | |
| 21 | 20 | Pang Chuyuan | China | 1:10.43 | 1:10.09 | |
| 22 | 24 | Lisa Francesia | Italy | 1:11.49 | 1:10.68 | |
| 23 | 28 | Remi Yoshida | Japan | 1:12.25 | 1:10.89 | |
| 24 | 22 | Kata Mandel | Romania | 1:11.27 | 1:11.59 | |
| 25 | 21 | Henrietta Bartalis | Romania | 1:12.42 | 1:12.33 | |
| 26 | 30 | Virginia Boyd | United States | 1:12.96 | 1:13.18 | |
| 27 | 23 | Woo Su-been | South Korea | DNF | 1:15.11 | |
| 28 | 27 | Blanca Brunner | Hungary | 1:23.23 | 1:18.54 | |
| | 25 | Mai Brit Teder | Estonia | 1:15.39 | DNF | |
| | 18 | Amber Essex | Australia | Did not start | | |

== Elimination round ==
=== Quarterfinals ===
Heat 1

| Rank | Bib | Name | Country | Notes |
|---|---|---|---|---|
| 1 | 8 | Meryeta Odine | Canada | Q |
| 2 | 1 | Sina Siegenthaler | Switzerland | Q |
| 3 | 16 | Acy Craig | United States | |
| 4 | 9 | Noemie Wiedmer | Switzerland | |

Heat 3

| Rank | Bib | Name | Country | Notes |
|---|---|---|---|---|
| 1 | 3 | Julia Pereira de Sousa Mabileau | France | Q |
| 2 | 14 | Manon Petit-Lenoir | France | Q |
| 3 | 6 | Mia Clift | Australia | |
| 4 | 11 | Audrey McManiman | Canada | |

Heat 2

| Rank | Bib | Name | Country | Notes |
|---|---|---|---|---|
| 1 | 4 | Charlotte Bankes | United Kingdom | Q |
| 2 | 5 | Léa Casta | France | Q |
| 3 | 13 | Karolína Hrušová | Czech Republic | |
| | 12 | Brianna Schnorrbusch | United States | DNF |

Heat 4

| Rank | Bib | Name | Country | Notes |
|---|---|---|---|---|
| 1 | 2 | Michela Moioli | Italy | Q |
| 2 | 10 | Josie Baff | Australia | Q |
| 3 | 7 | Chloe Trespeuch | France | |
| 4 | 15 | Tess Critchlow | Canada | |

=== Semifinals ===
Heat 1

| Rank | Bib | Name | Country | Notes |
|---|---|---|---|---|
| 1 | 4 | Charlotte Bankes | United Kingdom | Q |
| 2 | 8 | Meryeta Odine | Canada | Q |
| 3 | 5 | Léa Casta | France | |
| 4 | 1 | Sina Siegenthaler | Switzerland | |

Heat 2

| Rank | Bib | Name | Country | Notes |
|---|---|---|---|---|
| 1 | 2 | Michela Moioli | Italy | Q |
| 2 | 3 | Julia Pereira de Sousa Mabileau | France | Q |
| 3 | 10 | Josie Baff | Australia | |
| 4 | 14 | Manon Petit-Lenoir | France | DNF |

=== Finals ===
==== Small final ====
| Rank | Bib | Name | Country | Notes |
|---|---|---|---|---|
| 5 | 5 | Léa Casta | France | |
| 6 | 14 | Manon Petit-Lenoir | France | |
| 7 | 10 | Josie Baff | Australia | |
| | 1 | Sina Siegenthaler | Switzerland | DNF |

==== Big final ====
| Rank | Bib | Name | Country | Notes |
|---|---|---|---|---|
| 1st place, gold medalist(s) | 2 | Michela Moioli | Italy | |
| 2nd place, silver medalist(s) | 4 | Charlotte Bankes | United Kingdom | |
| 3rd place, bronze medalist(s) | 3 | Julia Pereira de Sousa Mabileau | France | |
| 4 | 8 | Meryeta Odine | Canada | |
