= FIS Freestyle Ski and Snowboarding World Championships 2023 – Women's snowboard cross =

Women's snowboard cross at the FIS Freestyle Ski and Snowboarding World Championships 2023
- Location: Bakuriani, Georgia
- Dates: 1 March
- Competitors: 27 from 15 nations

Medalists
gold medal	Eva Adamczyková	Czech Republic
silver medal	Josie Baff	Australia
bronze medal	Lindsey Jacobellis	United States

The Women's snowboard cross competition at the FIS Freestyle Ski and Snowboarding World Championships 2023 was held on 1 March 2023.

== Elimination round ==
=== 1/8 finals ===
Heat 1

Rank	Bib	Name	Country	Notes
1	17	Jana Fischer	Germany	Q
2	16	Sophie Hediger	Switzerland	Q
	1	Charlotte Bankes	Great Britain	DNF

Heat 3

Rank	Bib	Name	Country	Notes
1	5	Lindsey Jacobellis	United States	Q
2	12	Lara Casanova	Switzerland	Q
3	21	Brianna Schnorrbusch	United States	

Heat 5

Rank	Bib	Name	Country	Notes
1	3	Josie Baff	Australia	Q
2	14	Caterina Carpano	Italy	Q
3	19	Léa Casta	France	

Heat 7

Rank	Bib	Name	Country	Notes
1	7	Stacy Gaskill	United States	Q
2	10	Audrey McManiman	Canada	Q
3	26	Woo Su-been	South Korea	
4	23	Nienke Poll	Netherlands	

Heat 2

Rank	Bib	Name	Country	Notes
1	8	Eva Adamczyková	Czech Republic	Q
2	9	Pia Zerkhold	Austria	Q
3	25	Yongqinglamu	China	
4	24	Blanca Brunner	Hungary	

Heat 4

Rank	Bib	Name	Country	Notes
1	4	Faye Gulini	United States	Q
2	13	Sofia Belingheri	Italy	Q
3	20	Vendula Hopjáková	Czech Republic	

Heat 6

Rank	Bib	Name	Country	Notes
1	6	Manon Petit-Lenoir	France	Q
2	11	Alexia Queyrel	France	Q
3	27	Pang Chuyuan	China	
4	22	Runa Suzuki	Japan	

Heat 8

Rank	Bib	Name	Country	Notes
1	2	Chloé Trespeuch	France	Q
2	15	Raffaella Brutto	Italy	Q
3	18	Francesca Gallina	Italy	

=== Quarterfinals ===
Heat 1

Rank	Bib	Name	Country	Notes
1	8	Eva Adamczyková	Czech Republic	Q
2	17	Jana Fischer	Germany	Q
3	16	Sophie Hediger	Switzerland	
4	9	Pia Zerkhold	Austria	

Heat 3

Rank	Bib	Name	Country	Notes
1	3	Josie Baff	Australia	Q
2	6	Manon Petit-Lenoir	France	Q
3	11	Alexia Queyrel	France	
4	14	Caterina Carpano	Italy	

Heat 2

Rank	Bib	Name	Country	Notes
1	5	Lindsey Jacobellis	United States	Q
2	12	Lara Casanova	Switzerland	Q
3	4	Faye Gulini	United States	
	13	Sofia Belingheri	Italy	DNF

Heat 4

Rank	Bib	Name	Country	Notes
1	2	Chloé Trespeuch	France	Q
2	10	Audrey McManiman	Canada	Q
3	15	Raffaella Brutto	Italy	
4	7	Stacy Gaskill	United States	

=== Semifinals ===
Heat 1

Rank	Bib	Name	Country	Notes
1	8	Eva Adamczyková	Czech Republic	Q
2	5	Lindsey Jacobellis	United States	Q
3	17	Jana Fischer	Germany	
4	12	Lara Casanova	Switzerland	

Heat 2

Rank	Bib	Name	Country	Notes
1	6	Manon Petit-Lenoir	France	Q
2	3	Josie Baff	Australia	Q
3	10	Audrey McManiman	Canada	
	2	Chloé Trespeuch	France	DNF

=== Finals ===
==== Small final ====
Rank	Bib	Name	Country	Notes
5	2	Chloé Trespeuch	France	
6	17	Jana Fischer	Germany	
7	10	Audrey McManiman	Canada	
8	12	Lara Casanova	Switzerland	

==== Big final ====
Rank	Bib	Name	Country	Notes
1st place, gold medalist(s)	8	Eva Adamczyková	Czech Republic	
2nd place, silver medalist(s)	3	Josie Baff	Australia	
3rd place, bronze medalist(s)	5	Lindsey Jacobellis	United States	
4	6	Manon Petit-Lenoir	France	
