= FIS Freestyle Ski and Snowboarding World Championships 2025 – Mixed snowboard team cross =

Mixed snowboard team cross at the FIS Freestyle Ski and Snowboarding World Championships 2025
- Location: Engadin, Switzerland
- Dates: 29 March
- Competitors: 32
- Teams: 16

Medalists
gold medal	Loan Bozzolo; Julia Pereira de Sousa Mabileau	France
silver medal	Cameron Bolton; Mia Clift	Australia
bronze medal	Valerio Jud; Sina Siegenthaler	Switzerland

The Mixed snowboard team cross competition at the FIS Freestyle Ski and Snowboarding World Championships 2025 was held on 29 March 2025.

== Elimination round ==
Four-team elimination races were held, with the top two from each race advancing.

=== Quarterfinals ===
Heat 1

Rank	Bib	Country	Athletes	Notes
1	1	France 1	Loan Bozzolo; Julia Pereira de Sousa Mabileau	Q
2	8	Germany 1	Martin Nörl; Jana Fischer	Q
3	9	United States 2	Nathan Pare; Brianna Schnorrbusch	
4	16	China 1	Gao Dali; Pang Chuyuan	

Heat 3

Rank	Bib	Country	Athletes	Notes
1	14	United States 1	Nick Baumgartner; Acy Craig	Q
2	6	Australia 2	Cameron Bolton; Mia Clift	Q
3	11	Canada 2	Evan Bichon; Audrey McManiman	
4	3	Canada 1	Éliot Grondin; Meryeta Odine	

Heat 2

Rank	Bib	Country	Athletes	Notes
1	13	Switzerland 1	Valerio Jud; Sina Siegenthaler	Q
2	5	Australia 1	Adam Lambert; Josie Baff	Q
3	12	United Kingdom 1	Huw Nightingale; Charlotte Bankes	
4	4	Austria 1	Jakob Dusek; Pia Zerkhold	

Heat 4

Rank	Bib	Country	Athletes	Notes
1	7	Italy 1	Lorenzo Sommariva; Lara Casanova	Q
2	2	France 2	Aidan Chollet; Léa Casta	Q
3	10	Czech Republic 1	Radek Houser; Karolína Hrušová	
4	15	Japan 1	Yoshiki Takahara; Remi Yoshida	

=== Semifinals ===
Heat 1

Rank	Bib	Country	Athletes	Notes
1	13	Switzerland 1	Valerio Jud; Sina Siegenthaler	Q
2	1	France 1	Loan Bozzolo; Julia Pereira de Sousa Mabileau	Q
3	5	Australia 1	Adam Lambert; Josie Baff	
4	8	Germany 1	Martin Nörl; Jana Fischer	

Heat 2

Rank	Bib	Country	Athletes	Notes
1	2	France 2	Aidan Chollet; Léa Casta	Q
2	6	Australia 2	Cameron Bolton; Mia Clift	Q
3	7	Italy 1	Lorenzo Sommariva; Lara Casanova	
4	14	United States 1	Nick Baumgartner; Acy Craig	

=== Finals ===
==== Small final ====
Rank	Bib	Country	Athletes	Notes
5	7	Italy 1	Lorenzo Sommariva; Lara Casanova	
6	5	Australia 1	Adam Lambert; Josie Baff	
7	8	Germany 1	Martin Nörl; Jana Fischer	

==== Big final ====
Rank	Bib	Country	Athletes	Notes
1st place, gold medalist(s)	1	France 1	Loan Bozzolo; Julia Pereira de Sousa Mabileau	
2nd place, silver medalist(s)	6	Australia 2	Cameron Bolton; Mia Clift	
3rd place, bronze medalist(s)	13	Switzerland 1	Valerio Jud; Sina Siegenthaler	
4	2	France 2	Aidan Chollet; Léa Casta	
