= Snowboarding at the 2024 Winter Youth Olympics – Mixed team snowboard cross =

Mixed team snowboard cross at the IV Winter Youth Olympic Games
- Venue: Welli Hilli Park
- Date: 21 January
- Competitors: 38 from 13 nations
- Teams: 19

Medalists
1st place, gold medalist(s)		Jonas Chollet; Léa Casta	France
2nd place, silver medalist(s)		Benjamin Niel; Maja-Li Iafrate Danielsson	France
3rd place, bronze medalist(s)		William Martin; Abbey Wilson	Australia

The mixed team snowboard cross event in snowboarding at the 2024 Winter Youth Olympics took place on 21 January at the Welli Hilli Park.

== Results ==
=== Pre-heats ===
The Pre-heats were started at 11:00.

Q — Qualified for the quarterfinals
Pre-Heat 1

Rank	Bib	Country	Athletes	Deficit	Notes
1	13	Canada 2	Olivier Gagne; Rose Savard-Ferguson		Q
2	16	Slovakia 1	Oliver Šebesta; Dorota Pitoňáková	+2.43	Q
3	17	South Korea 1	Kim Ye-bin; Hwang Se-lim	DNF	

Pre-Heat 2

Rank	Bib	Country	Athletes	Deficit	Notes
1	18	Italy 1	Federico Casi; Lisa Francesia Boirai		Q
2	15	Germany 1	Kenta Kirchwehm; Rosalie Bauer	+0.77	Q
3	19	Bulgaria 1	Ivan Ivanov; Andrea Kotsinova	+1.17	
4	14	Spain 1	Martxelo Uruzola; Andrea Seijas	+5.03	

=== Quarterfinals ===
The quarterfinals were started at 11:20.

Q — Qualified for the semifinals
Quarterfinal 1

Rank	Bib	Country	Athletes	Deficit	Notes
1	18	Italy 1	Federico Casi; Lisa Francesia Boirai		Q
2	9	Japan 1	Daisuke Muraoka; Rio Ishida	+0.44	Q
3	1	United States 1	Boden Gerry; Brianna Schnorrbusch	+2.45	
4	8	Australia 2	Cameron Turner; Lara Walsh	+3.54	

Quarterfinal 2

Rank	Bib	Country	Athletes	Deficit	Notes
1	5	France 1	Jonas Chollet; Léa Casta		Q
2	4	Switzerland 1	Noah Kocherhans; Noémie Wiedmer	+5.34	Q
3	12	Switzerland 2	Jonas Aschilier; Nuria Gubser	+6.91	
4	13	Canada 2	Olivier Gagne; Rose Savard-Ferguson	+7.12	

Quarterfinal 3

Rank	Bib	Country	Athletes	Deficit	Notes
1	6	Australia 1	William Martin; Abbey Wilson		Q
2	3	United States 2	Mason Hamel; Hanna Percy	+3.62	Q
3	11	Italy 2	Tommaso Costa; Aurora Drolma Dusi	+9.78	
4	15	Germany 1	Kenta Kirchwehm; Rosalie Bauer	DNF	

Quarterfinal 4

Rank	Bib	Country	Athletes	Deficit	Notes
1	7	France 2	Benjamin Niel; Maja-Li Iafrate Danielsson		Q
2	2	Czech Republic 1	Štěpán Hlaváček; Karolína Hrušová	+3.84	Q
3	16	Slovakia 1	Oliver Šebesta; Dorota Pitoňáková	+11.77	
4	10	Canada 1	Anthony Shelly; Hannah Turkington	DNS	

=== Semifinals ===
The semifinals were started at 12:00.

BF — Qualified for the Big Final
SF — Qualified for the Small Final
Semifinal 1

Rank	Bib	Country	Athletes	Deficit	Notes
1	5	France 1	Jonas Chollet; Léa Casta		BF
2	4	Switzerland 1	Noah Kocherhans; Noémie Wiedmer	+4.76	BF
3	18	Italy 1	Federico Casi; Lisa Francesia Boirai	+4.93	SF
4	9	Japan 1	Daisuke Muraoka; Rio Ishida	+7.48	SF

Semifinal 2

Rank	Bib	Country	Athletes	Deficit	Notes
1	7	France 2	Benjamin Niel; Maja-Li Iafrate Danielsson		BF
2	6	Australia 1	William Martin; Abbey Wilson	+0.39	BF
3	3	United States 2	Mason Hamel; Hanna Percy	+0.57	SF
4	2	Czech Republic 1	Štěpán Hlaváček; Karolína Hrušová	DNF	SF

=== Finals ===
The finals were started at 12:30.

Small Final

Rank	Bib	Country	Athletes	Deficit	Notes
5	3	United States 2	Mason Hamel; Hanna Percy		
6	2	Czech Republic 1	Štěpán Hlaváček; Karolína Hrušová	+0.75	
7	9	Japan 1	Daisuke Muraoka; Rio Ishida	+2.54	
8	18	Italy 1	Federico Casi; Lisa Francesia Boirai	+2.64	

Big Final

Rank	Bib	Country	Athletes	Deficit	Notes
1st place, gold medalist(s)	5	France 1	Jonas Chollet; Léa Casta		
2nd place, silver medalist(s)	7	France 2	Benjamin Niel; Maja-Li Iafrate Danielsson	+2.11	
3rd place, bronze medalist(s)	6	Australia 1	William Martin; Abbey Wilson	+2.37	
4	4	Switzerland 1	Noah Kocherhans; Noémie Wiedmer	+4.32	
