= Kaishu Hirano =

Japanese snowboarder (born 2002)

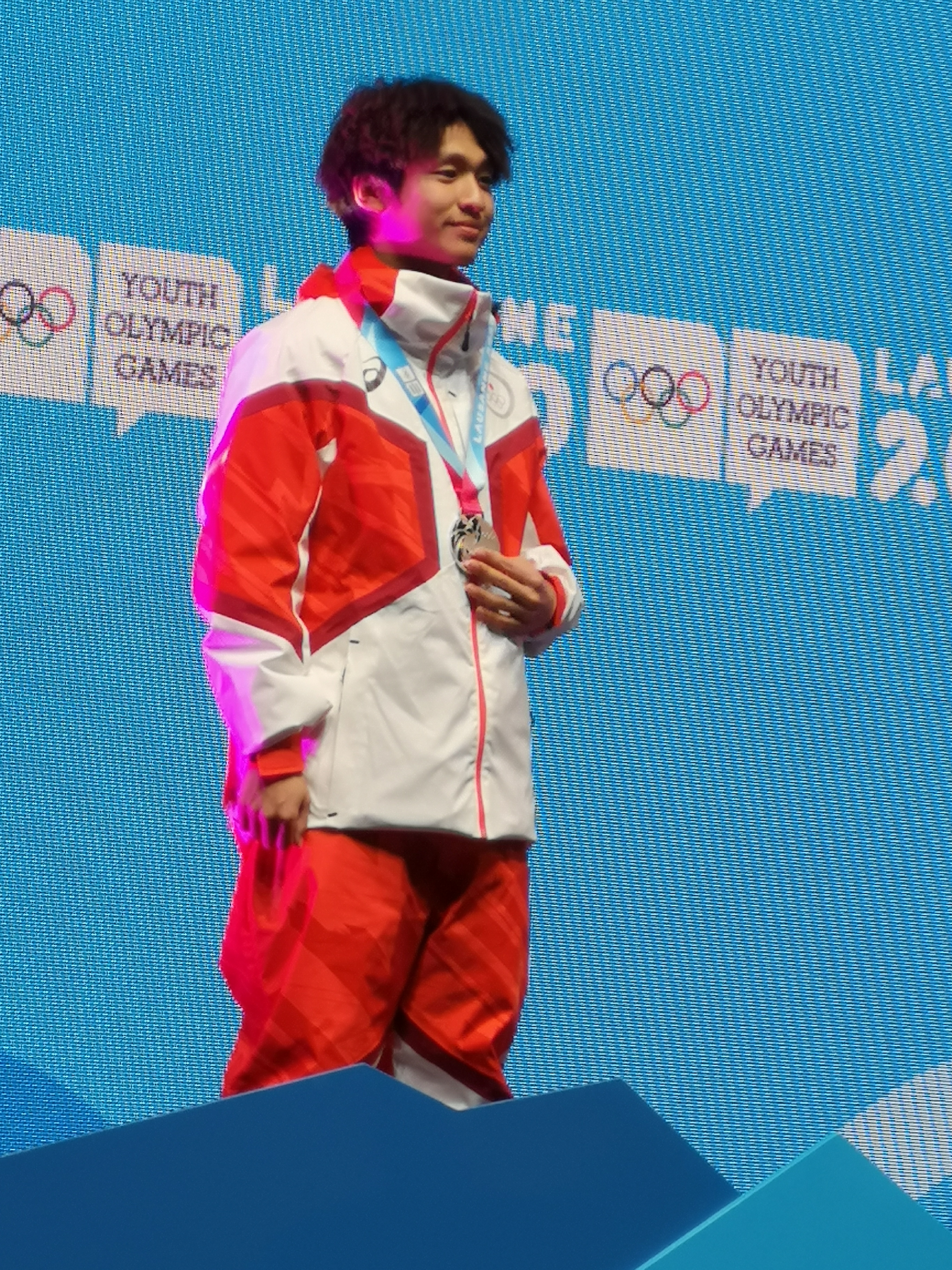
- Hirano at the 2020 Winter Youth Olympics

Personal information
- Nationality: Japanese
- Born: 14 October 2002 (age 23) Murakami, Niigata

Sport
- Country: Japan
- Sport: Snowboarding
- Event: Halfpipe
Medal record
Winter Youth Olympics
Silver medal – second place	2020 Lausanne	Halfpipe
Junior World Championships
Bronze medal – third place	2018 Cardrona	Halfpipe
Winter X Games
Bronze medal – third place	2022 Aspen	Superpipe

Kaishu Hirano (平野海祝, born 14 October 2002) is a Japanese snowboarder who competed at the 2022 Winter Olympics.

== Career ==
Hirano competed at the 2018 FIS Snowboarding Junior World Championships and won a bronze medal in the halfpipe event.

He represented Japan at the 2020 Winter Youth Olympics and won a silver medal in the halfpipe event.

He competed at the 2022 Winter X Games in Aspen, Colorado and won a bronze medal in the superpipe event.

He represented Japan at the 2022 Winter Olympics in the men's halfpipe event and finished ninth. He broke the world record for height on a superpipe trick.

== Personal life ==
Kaishu's brother, Ayumu Hirano, is also a snowboarder.
