= Snowboarding at the 2024 Winter Youth Olympics – Women's snowboard cross =

Women's snowboard cross at the IV Winter Youth Olympic Games
- Venue: Welli Hilli Park
- Dates: 20 January
- Competitors: 22 from 15 nations

The women's snowboard cross event in snowboarding at the 2024 Winter Youth Olympics took place on 20 January at the Welli Hilli Park.

== Results ==
=== Group heats ===
Panel 1

Rank	Bib	Athlete	Group 1				Group 2				Group 3				Group 4				Group 5				Total
Rank	Bib	Athlete	1	2	3	4	5	6	7	8	9	10	11	12	13	14	15	16	17	18	19	20	Total
1	1	Léa Casta (FRA)	4				4				4				DNF				4				20
2	17	Andrea Kotsinova (BUL)			4		DNF						4					4		4			18
3	4	Abbey Wilson (AUS)	3					4				4				4				3			18
4	9	Hannah Turkington (CAN)		2			3					3					4					4	16
5	5	Guusje de Booy (NED)	2						4				3				3				4		16
6	21	Lisa Francesia Boirai (ITA)			3				3		3					3						3	15
7	12	Rio Ishida (JPN)		4				3			2							3			3		15
8	20	Dorota Pitoňáková (SVK)			2			2						4			2		3				13
9	8	Lara Walsh (AUS)	1							4				3				2				2	12
10	16	Andrea Seijas (ESP)		1						3			2			2			2				10
11	13	Karolína Šperlová (CZE)		3					DNF					DNS	DNS					DNS			5

Panel 2

Rank	Bib	Athlete	Group 1				Group 2				Group 3				Group 4				Group 5				Total
Rank	Bib	Athlete	1	2	3	4	5	6	7	8	9	10	11	12	13	14	15	16	17	18	19	20	Total
1	7	Noémie Wiedmer (SUI)	3							4				4				4				4	19
2	3	Maja-Li Iafrate Danielsson (FRA)	4					2				4				4				4			18
3	2	Brianna Schnorrbusch (USA)	2				4				4				4				3				17
4	6	Karolína Hrušová (CZE)	DNF						4				4				4				3		17
5	15	Rose Savard-Ferguson (CAN)		4						3			3			3			4				17
6	22	Rosalie Bauer (GER)			4				3		3					2						3	15
7	10	Hanna Percy (USA)		3			3					3					3					2	14
8	14	Aurora Drolma Dusi (ITA)		2					2					3	3					3			13
9	11	Nuria Gubser (SUI)		1				4			2							3			3		13
10	19	Mai Brit Teder (EST)			3			3						2			2		2				12
11	18	Hwang Se-lim (KOR)			2		DNF						DNS					DNS		DNS			4

=== Semifinals ===
Semifinal 1

Rank	Bib	Name	Deficit	Notes
1	1	Léa Casta (FRA)		BF
2	3	Maja-Li Iafrate Danielsson (FRA)		BF
3	9	Hannah Turkington (CAN)		SF
4	2	Brianna Schnorrbusch (USA)		SF

Semifinal 2

Rank	Bib	Name	Deficit	Notes
1	7	Noémie Wiedmer (SUI)		BF
2	4	Abbey Wilson (AUS)		BF
3	17	Andrea Kotsinova (BUL)		SF
4	6	Karolína Hrušová (CZE)		SF

=== Finals ===
Small final

Rank	Bib	Name	Deficit	Notes
1	9	Hannah Turkington (CAN)		
2	6	Karolína Hrušová (CZE)		
3	2	Brianna Schnorrbusch (USA)		
4	17	Andrea Kotsinova (BUL)		

Big final

Rank	Bib	Name	Deficit	Notes
1st place, gold medalist(s)	7	Noémie Wiedmer (SUI)		
2nd place, silver medalist(s)	3	Maja-Li Iafrate Danielsson (FRA)		
3rd place, bronze medalist(s)	1	Léa Casta (FRA)		
4	4	Abbey Wilson (AUS)		
