= Aurélie Moisan =

Canadian snowboarder (born 2005)

Personal information
- Born: January 26, 2005 (age 21) Baie-D'Urfé, Canada

Sport
- Country: Canada
- Sport: Snowboarding
- Events: Parallel giant slalom, Parallel slalom
Medal record
World Junior Championships
Gold medal – first place	2025 Zakopane	Parallel Giant Slalom
Gold medal – first place	2024 Lachtal	Parallel Giant Slalom
Gold medal – first place	2024 Lachtal	Parallel Slalom

Aurélie Moisan (born January 26, 2005) is a Canadian snowboarder who competes internationally in the alpine snowboard discipline.

== Career ==
Moisan is a three time World Junior Champion. Moisan won both individual alpine gold medals (parallel slalom and giant slalom) at the 2024 World Junior Championships in Lachtal, Austria. Moisan followed this up with a gold medal in the parallel giant slalom at the 2025 World Junior Championships in Zakopane, Poland.

Moisan competed in the senior level during the 2024-2025 World Cup, where she picked up a career best performance of fourth in Saint-Côme, Quebec.

During the 2025-2026 World Cup, Moisan finished 12th and 13th in the first two stops of the tour.
