= 2021 FIS Freestyle Ski and Snowboarding Junior World Championships =

International winter sports competition

2021 FIS Freestyle Ski and Snowboarding Junior World Championships are the Junior World Championships in freestyle skiing and snowboarding organized by the International Ski Federation (FIS).

== Medals ==
Rank	Nation	Gold	Silver	Bronze	Total
1	Russia (RUS)	15	4	15	34
2	Japan (JPN)	7	6	0	13
3	Czech Republic (CZE)	3	1	1	5
3	Finland (FIN)	3	1	1	5
5	Austria (AUT)	2	3	1	6
6	Belgium (BEL)	1	0	1	2
6	Estonia (EST)	1	0	1	2
8	Canada (CAN)	1	0	0	1
9	Switzerland (SUI)	0	4	4	8
10	Germany (GER)	0	4	0	4
11	Belarus (BLR)	0	2	1	3
11	Italy (ITA)	0	2	1	3
13	France (FRA)	0	2	0	2
14	South Korea (KOR)	0	1	2	3
15	Netherlands (NED)	0	0	1	1
15	Spain (ESP)	0	0	1	1
Totals (16 entries)		33	30	30	93

== See also ==
- FIS Freestyle World Ski Championships
- FIS Freestyle Junior World Ski Championships
- FIS Snowboarding World Championships
- FIS Snowboarding Junior World Championships
