= Valerio Jud =

Swiss snowboarder (born 2002)

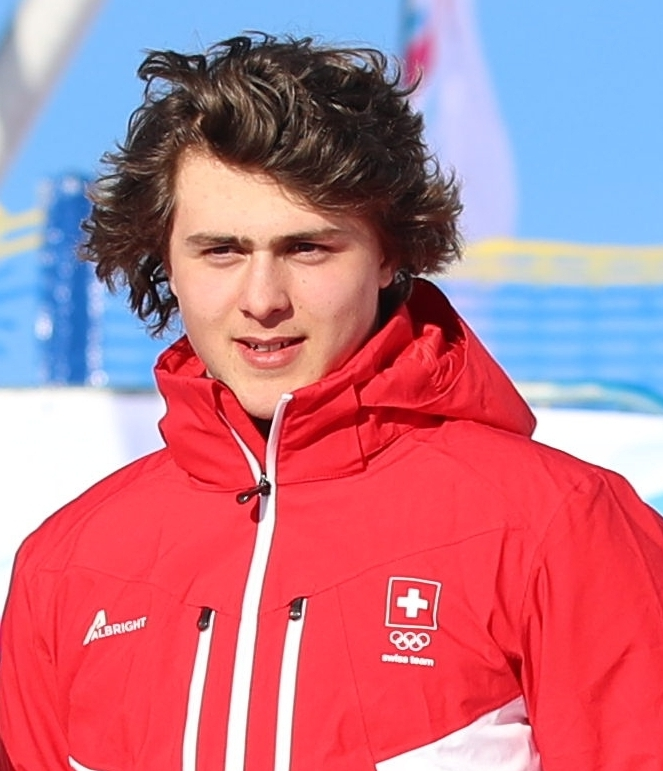
- Jud at the 2020 Winter Youth Olympics

Personal information
- Born: 24 July 2002 (age 23)

Sport
- Country: Switzerland
- Sport: Snowboarding
- Event: Snowboard cross
Medal record
Men's snowboarding
Representing Switzerland
World Championships
Bronze medal – third place	2025 Engadin	Mixed snowboard team cross
Winter Youth Olympics
Gold medal – first place	2020 Lausanne	Snowboard cross
Gold medal – first place	2020 Lausanne	Team snowboard cross

Valerio Jud (born 24 July 2002) is a Swiss snowboarder who specializes in snowboard cross.

== Career ==
Jud represented Switzerland at the 2020 Winter Youth Olympics and won gold medals in the snowboard cross and team snowboard cross events.

Jud represented Switzerland at the 2025 Snowboarding World Championships and won a bronze medal in the mixed snowboard team cross event, along with Sina Siegenthaler.
