= Hanna Percy =

American snowboarder (born 2007)

Personal information
- Born: July 17, 2007 (age 18) Truckee, California, U.S.

Sport
- Country: United States
- Sport: Snowboarding
- Event: Snowboard cross

Hanna Percy (born July 17, 2007) is an American snowboarder specializing in snowboard cross. She represented the United States at the 2026 Winter Olympics.

== Early life and education ==
Percy's parents were both professional snowboarders in the 1990s. She moved from Truckee, California, to attend Gould Academy in Maine at 16 years old.

== Career ==
Percy represented the United States at the 2024 Winter Youth Olympics in snowboard cross and mixed team snowboard cross. Her best finish was fifth place in the mixed team snowboard cross event.

In January 2026, she was selected to represent the United States at the 2026 Winter Olympics. She placed 18th in the snowboard cross event.
