= Zion Bethônico =

Brazilian snowboarder (born 2006)

Personal information
- Born: 28 January 2006 (age 20) Florianópolis, Brazil

Sport
- Country: Brazil
- Sport: Snowboarding
Medal record
Youth Olympic Games
Bronze medal – third place	2024 Gangwon	Snowboarding

Zion Bethônico (born 28 January 2006) is a snowboarder from Brazil. He competed in the 2024 Winter Youth Olympics,held in Gangwon, South Korea, where he earned a bronze medal in the men's snowboard cross event, becoming the first athlete from Brazil to win a Winter Youth Olympic medal. This was only the second Winter Youth Olympics medal by a tropical nation, after Colombia's silver in 2020.
