= Snowboarding at the 2024 Winter Youth Olympics – Men's snowboard cross =

Men's snowboard cross at the IV Winter Youth Olympic Games
- Venue: Welli Hilli Park
- Dates: 20 January
- Competitors: 28 from 18 nations

Medalists
| 1st place, gold medalist(s) | | Jonas Chollet | France |
| 2nd place, silver medalist(s) | | Anthony Shelly | Canada |
| 3rd place, bronze medalist(s) | | Zion Bethônico | Brazil |

The men's snowboard cross event in snowboarding at the 2024 Winter Youth Olympics took place on 20 January at the Welli Hilli Park.

== Results ==
=== Group heats ===
Panel 1

| Rank | Bib | Athlete | Group 1 | | | | Group 2 | | | | Group 3 | | | | Group 4 | | | | Group 5 | | | | Total |
| Rank | Bib | Athlete | 1 | 2 | 3 | 4 | 5 | 6 | 7 | 8 | 9 | 10 | 11 | 12 | 13 | 14 | 15 | 16 | 17 | 18 | 19 | 20 | Total |
|---|---|---|---|---|---|---|---|---|---|---|---|---|---|---|---|---|---|---|---|---|---|---|---|
| 1 | 17 | Jonas Chollet (FRA) | | | 4 | | 3 | | | | | | 4 | | | | | 4 | | 4 | | | 19 |
| 2 | 13 | Benjamin Niel (FRA) | | 4 | | | | | 4 | | | | | 4 | 4 | | | | | 3 | | | 19 |
| 3 | 1 | Boden Gerry (USA) | 4 | | | | 4 | | | | 4 | | | | RAL | | | | 4 | | | | 16 |
| 4 | 5 | Kenta Kirchwehm (GER) | 3 | | | | | | 3 | | | | 2 | | | | 4 | | | | 4 | | 16 |
| 5 | 8 | Felix Schwenkel (GER) | 1 | | | | | | | 4 | | | | 3 | | | | 3 | | | | 4 | 15 |
| 6 | 12 | William Martin (AUS) | | 3 | | | | 4 | | | 2 | | | | | | | 2 | | | 3 | | 14 |
| 7 | 24 | Ivan Ivanov (BUL) | | | | | | | | | | | | | | | | | | | | | 14 |
| 8 | 9 | Cameron Turner (AUS) | | 2 | | | 2 | | | | | 4 | | | | | 3 | | | | | 2 | 13 |
| 9 | 16 | David Erhard (AUT) | | 1 | | | | | | 2 | | | 3 | | | 4 | | | 3 | | | | 13 |
| 10 | 4 | Štěpán Hlaváček (CZE) | 2 | | | | | 3 | | | | 2 | | | | 3 | | | | 2 | | | 12 |
| 11 | 21 | Jonas Aschilier (SUI) | | | 2 | | | | 2 | | 3 | | | | | 2 | | | | | | 3 | 12 |
| 12 | 20 | Max Benáčan (CZE) | | | 1 | | | 2 | | | | | | 2 | | | 2 | | 2 | | | | 9 |
| 13 | 28 | Ivan Ivchatov (UKR) | | | | 4 | | 1 | | | | | 1 | | 2 | | | | | | | 1 | 9 |
| 14 | 25 | Bálint Barabás (HUN) | | | | 3 | 1 | | | | | | | 1 | | 1 | | | | | 1 | | 7 |

Panel 2

| Rank | Bib | Athlete | Group 1 | | | | Group 2 | | | | Group 3 | | | | Group 4 | | | | Group 5 | | | | Total |
| Rank | Bib | Athlete | 1 | 2 | 3 | 4 | 5 | 6 | 7 | 8 | 9 | 10 | 11 | 12 | 13 | 14 | 15 | 16 | 17 | 18 | 19 | 20 | Total |
|---|---|---|---|---|---|---|---|---|---|---|---|---|---|---|---|---|---|---|---|---|---|---|---|
| 2 | 10 | Anthony Shelly (CAN) | | 4 | | | 3 | | | | | 4 | | | | | 4 | | | | | 4 | 19 |
| 2 | 3 | Mason Hamel (USA) | 4 | | | | | 4 | | | | 3 | | | | 4 | | | | 4 | | | 19 |
| 3 | 2 | Zion Bethonico (BRA) | 2 | | | | 4 | | | | 4 | | | | 4 | | | | 4 | | | | 18 |
| 4 | 7 | Daisuke Muraoka (JPN) | 3 | | | | | | | 4 | | | | 3 | | | | 4 | | | | 3 | 17 |
| 5 | 19 | Federico Casi (ITA) | | | 4 | | | 3 | | | | | | 4 | | | 3 | | 2 | | | | 16 |
| 6 | 11 | Tommaso Costa (ITA) | | 3 | | | | 1 | | | 3 | | | | | | | 3 | | | 4 | | 14 |
| 7 | 15 | Olivier Gagne (CAN) | | 2 | | | | | | 2 | | | 4 | | | 3 | | | 3 | | | | 14 |
| 8 | 6 | Noah Kocherhans (SUI) | 1 | | | | | | 4 | | | | 3 | | | | 2 | | | | 3 | | 13 |
| 9 | 27 | Moritz Murer (AUT) | | | | 4 | | 2 | | | | | 2 | | 3 | | | | | | | 1 | 12 |
| 10 | 14 | Oliver Šebesta (SVK) | | 1 | | | | | 3 | | | | | 2 | 2 | | | | | 3 | | | 11 |
| 11 | 18 | Martxelo Urruzola (ESP) | | | 3 | | 2 | | | | | | 1 | | | | | 2 | | 2 | | | 10 |
| 12 | 22 | Kim Ye-bin (KOR) | | | 2 | | | | 2 | | 2 | | | | | 2 | | | | | | 2 | 10 |
| 13 | 26 | Csanád Bakó-Vilhelem (ROU) | | | | 3 | 1 | | | | | | | 1 | | 1 | | | | | 2 | | 8 |
| 14 | 23 | Joo Yi-tak (KOR) | | | 1 | | | | | 3 | | 2 | | | 1 | | | | | | 1 | | 8 |

=== Semifinals ===
Semifinal 1

| Rank | Bib | Name | Deficit | Notes |
|---|---|---|---|---|
| 1 | 17 | Jonas Chollet (FRA) | | BF |
| 2 | 2 | Zion Bethonico (BRA) | | BF |
| 3 | 5 | Kenta Kirchwehm (GER) | | SF |
| 4 | 3 | Mason Hamel (USA) | | SF |

Semifinal 2

| Rank | Bib | Name | Deficit | Notes |
|---|---|---|---|---|
| 1 | 1 | Boden Gerry (USA) | | BF |
| 2 | 10 | Anthony Shelly (CAN) | | BF |
| 3 | 13 | Benjamin Niel (FRA) | | SF |
| 4 | 7 | Daisuke Muraoka (JPN) | | SF |

=== Finals ===
Small final

| Rank | Bib | Name | Deficit | Notes |
|---|---|---|---|---|
| 5 | 3 | Mason Hamel (USA) | | |
| 6 | 13 | Benjamin Niel (FRA) | | |
| 7 | 7 | Daisuke Muraoka (JPN) | | |
| 8 | 5 | Boden Gerry (USA) | | |

Big final

| Rank | Bib | Name | Deficit | Notes |
|---|---|---|---|---|
| 1st place, gold medalist(s) | 17 | Jonas Chollet (FRA) | | |
| 2nd place, silver medalist(s) | 10 | Anthony Shelly (CAN) | | |
| 3rd place, bronze medalist(s) | 2 | Zion Bethônico (BRA) | | |
| 4 | 1 | Boden Gerry (USA) | | |
