= Mia Clift =

Australian snowboarder (born 2004)

Personal information
- Born: 2 August 2004 (age 22) Melbourne, Victoria, Australia

Sport
- Sport: Snowboarding
- Event: Snowboard cross
Medal record
Women's snowboarding
Representing Australia
World Championships
Silver medal – second place	2025 Engadin	Mixed snowboard team cross

Mia Clift (born 2 August 2004) is an Australian snowboarder who specialises in snowboard cross.

== Career ==
Following the 2023–24 FIS Snowboard World Cup, Clift was named the FIS Snowboard Cross female rookie of the year.

In March 2025, Clift represented Australia at the 2025 Snowboarding World Championships and won a silver medal in the mixed snowboard team cross event, along with Cameron Bolton. During the final race of the 2024–25 FIS Snowboard World Cup on 5 April 2025, she earned her first career World Cup podium, finishing in second place.

In January 2026, she was selected to represent Australia at the 2026 Winter Olympics.

== Results ==
=== Olympic Winter Games ===
As of 18 February 2026

Competition	Individual snowboard cross	Mixed team snowboard cross
(Italy) 2026 Milano Cortina	12	8

=== World Championships ===
As of 18 February 2026

Competition	Individual snowboard cross	Mixed team snowboard cross
(Switzerland) 2025 World Championships	9	2nd place, silver medalist(s)
