= Tessa Maud =

American professional snowboarder

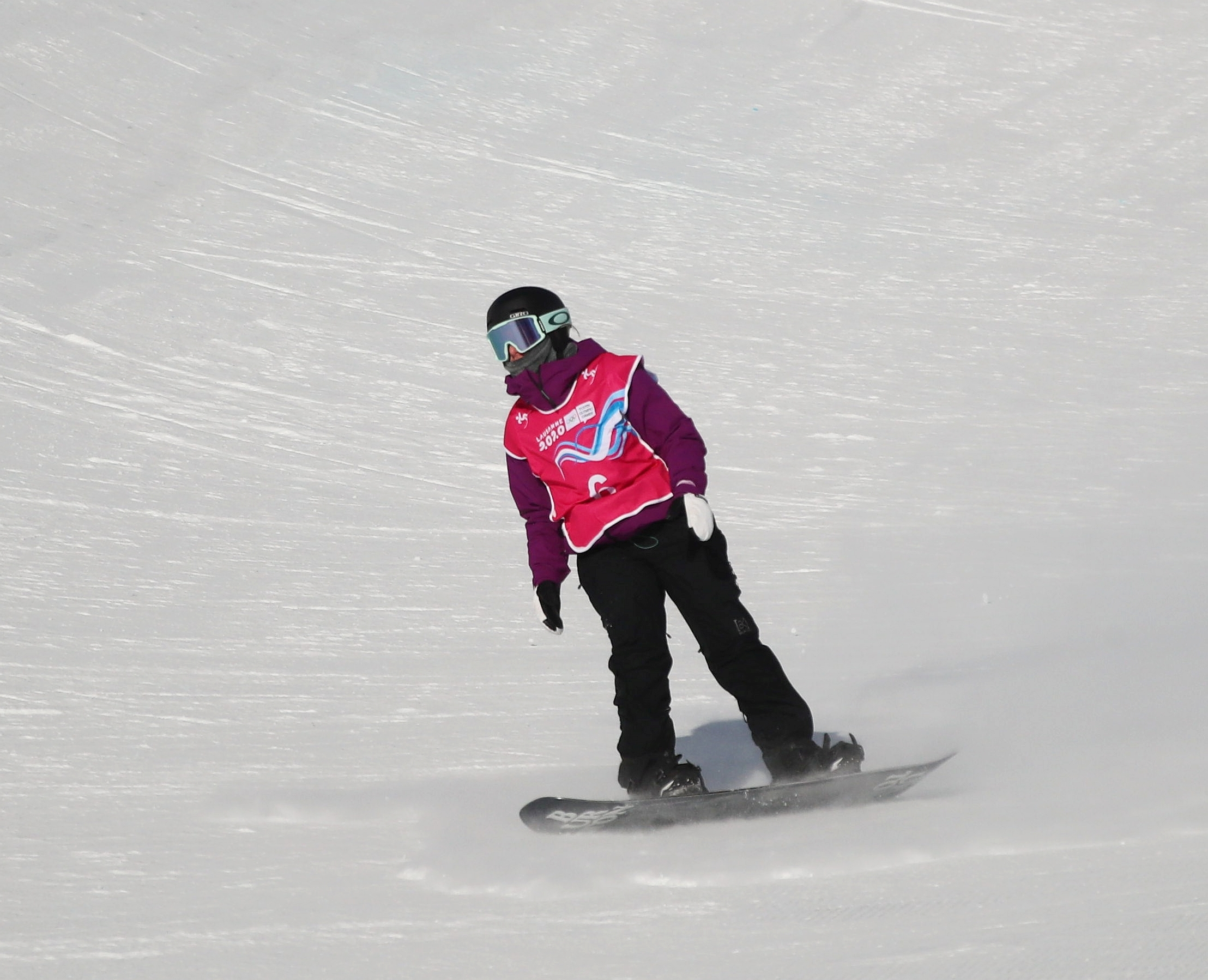
- Maud at the 2020 Winter Youth Olympics

Personal information
- Born: October 10, 2003 (age 22) Encinitas, California, U.S.
- Home town: Carlsbad, California, U.S.

Sport
- Country: United States
- Sport: Snowboarding
- Event: Half pipe
- Club: Mammoth Mountain Snowboard Team

Tessa Maud (born October 10, 2003) is an American professional snowboarder, specializing in half pipe. Maud was named to the US Team for the 2022 Winter Olympics, finishing 16th. She also competed in the 2020 Winter Youth Olympics, and has earned two silver medals at the Junior World Championships.

== Early life ==
At the age of seven, Maud joined the local Mammoth Mountain Snowboard Team (MMSST). Her parents are also avid snowboarders.

== Career ==
In 2018, she was named to the Team USA snowboarding Rookie Squad.

=== 2022 Winter Olympics ===
On January 21, 2022, Team USA announced that she had been selected to represent the United States at the 2022 Winter Olympics in Beijing, China, her first Winter Olympics. She finished sixteenth in the women's halfpipe, missing qualifying for the finals, which required finishing in the top twelve. During the games, Maud praised the dining experiences she had in the country, stating that Chinese cuisine is "hands down the best she's ever had".
