= Niina Sarias =

Finnish snowboarder

Personal information
- Nationality: Finnish
- Born: 20 August 1984 (age 40); Oulu, Finland

Sport
- Sport: Snowboarding

Niina Sarias (born 20 August 1984) is a Finnish snowboarder. She competed in the women's parallel giant slalom event at the 2006 Winter Olympics.
