= Charlie Cosnier =

French snowboarder (born 1980)

Personal information
- Nationality: French
- Born: 7 January 1980 (age 45); Sélestat, France

Sport
- Sport: Snowboarding

Charlie Cosnier (born 7 January 1980) is a French snowboarder. He competed in the men's parallel giant slalom event at the 2002 Winter Olympics.
