= Cameron Bolton =

Australian snowboarder (born 1990)

Cam Bolton
Personal information
- Nationality: Australian
- Born: 21 November 1990 (age 35) Melbourne, Victoria, Australia

Sport
- Sport: Snowboarding
- Event: Snowboard Cross
Medal record
Men's snowboarding
Representing Australia
World Championships
Silver medal – second place	2025 Engadin	Mixed snowboard team cross

Cameron "Cam" Bolton (born 21 November 1990) is an Australian snowboarder. He competed at the 2014 Winter Olympics in Sochi, Russia, and the 2018 Winter Olympics in Pyeongchang, South Korea.
