= Rudy Galli =

Italian snowboarder

Personal information
- Nationality: Italian
- Born: 21 September 1983 (age 41); Tirano, Italy

Sport
- Sport: Snowboarding

Rudy Galli (born 21 September 1983) is an Italian snowboarder. He competed in the men's parallel giant slalom event at the 2006 Winter Olympics.
