= Clair Bidez =

American snowboarder (born 1987)

Personal information
- Full name: Clair Bidez
- Born: August 7, 1987 (age 38) Vail, Colorado, U.S.

Sport
- Country: United States
- Sport: Snowboarding
Medal record
Representing the United States
Woman's snowboarding
Gold medal – first place	Halfpipe Junior World Championships	snowboarding
Silver medal – second place	Junior World Championships	snowboarding
Silver medal – second place	Jeep King of the Mountain	snowboarding
Silver medal – second place	Grand Prix, Tamarack, ID	snowboarding
Bronze medal – third place	World Cup, Cardrona New Zealand	snowboarding
Bronze medal – third place	Abominable Snow Jam	snowboarding
Bronze medal – third place	Vans’ Cup Superpipe	snowboarding

Clair Bidez (born August 7, 1987) is an American former professional snowboarder and research analyst.

== Early life and education ==
Bidez grew up in the Vail Valley in Colorado and attended Battle Mountain High School. She skied from the age of two and was a ski racer. She began snowboarding at the age of nine. Her younger brother Dillon was also a competitive snowboarder.

== Snowboarding career ==
At age 10, Bidez began competing as a snowboarder. When she was 16, she placed 5th at the US Open at Stratton Mountain and was asked to join the U.S. Snowboarding team soon after.

In 2006, she became the Halfpipe Junior World Champion in Vivaldi Park, South Korea. At the Winter X Games XX, she placed 4th in halfpipe competition. In the last Grand Prix of 2009 at Copper Mountain, she broke her heel in the finals.

After recovering from her injury, Bidez made it to finals in every Olympic qualifier. She was featured in the 2010 Sports Illustrated Swimsuit Edition as a potential Olympian, but a persistent ankle injury turned out to be the end of her professional snowboard career. The injury, along with a desire to go back to school, influenced her decision to retire from competitive snowboarding.

== Personal life ==
Bidez was born in 1987 and grew up in Minturn, Colorado. Her younger brother Dylan was also a member of the U.S. Snowboarding Team.

Bidez earned a Bachelor of Science degree from Westminster College (through a special Tuition Grant Program with USSA) and a Master of Science degree in Geography from the University of Utah.
