= Valery Kolegov =

Russian snowboarder (born 1995)

Personal information
- Born: 29 November 1995 (age 30) Tashtagol, Russia

Sport
- Sport: Skiing

Valery Kolegov (born 29 November 1995 in Tashtagol) is a Russian snowboarder, specializing in Alpine snowboarding.

Kolegov competed at the 2014 Winter Olympics for Russia. He was 19th in the parallel giant slalom qualifying round, and was disqualified in the parallel slalom, failing to advance in both.

Kolegov won three gold medals and a silver medal across three Junior World Championships.

Kolegov made his World Cup debut in March 2012. As of September 2014, his best finish is 25th, at a pair of parallel giant slalom events in 2013–14. His best overall finish is 43rd, in 2013–14.
