= Léa Casta =

French snowboarder (born 2006)

Personal information
- Born: 10 February 2006 (age 20) Thonon-les-Bains, France

Sport
- Country: France
- Sport: Snowboarding
- Event: Snowboard cross
Medal record
Women's snowboarding
Representing France
Olympic Games
Bronze medal – third place	2026 Milano Cortina	Mixed team snowboard cross
Winter Youth Olympics
Gold medal – first place	2024 Gangwon	Mixed team snowboard cross
Bronze medal – third place	2024 Gangwon	Snowboard cross

Léa Casta (French pronunciation: [lea kasta]; born 10 February 2006) is a French snowboarder who specializes in snowboard cross. She won a bronze medal at the 2026 Winter Olympics.

== Career ==
In January 2024, Casta represented France at the 2024 Winter Youth Olympics where she served as the flag bearer during the opening ceremony and won a gold medal in the mixed team snowboard cross and a bronze medal in the snowboard cross events. In April 2024, she then competed at the FIS Snowboarding Junior World Championships where she won gold medals in the snowboard cross and snowboard cross team events.

Casta represented France at the 2025 Snowboarding World Championships and finished in fourth place in the mixed snowboard team cross event and fifth place in the snowboard cross events. During the 2024–25 FIS Snowboard World Cup, Casta won the crystal globe in the snowboard cross with 805 points, becoming the fourth French woman to win the crystal globe in the discipline. Charlotte Bankes was the discipline leader for the majority of the World Cup, however, she missed the last two races after suffering a broken collarbone in a season-ending training crash on 4 April 2025.

In April 2025, she competed at the FIS Snowboarding Junior World Championships where she won gold medals in the snowboard cross and snowboard cross team event, along with Jonas Chollet. She won the opening race of the 2025–26 FIS Snowboard World Cup on 13 December 2025.

In January 2026, she was selected to represent France at the 2026 Winter Olympics. She finished eighth in the individual event, before winning the bronze medal in the mixed team event alongside Loan Bozzolo.
