= Abbey Wilson =

Australian snowboarder (born 2006)

Personal information
- Born: 2 July 2006 (age 19) Cooma, Australia

Sport
- Sport: Snowboarding
- Event: Snowboard cross
Medal record
Women's snowboarding
Representing Australia
Winter Youth Olympics
Bronze medal – third place	2024 Gangwon	Mixed team snowboard cross

Abbey Wilson (born 2 July 2006) is an Australian snowboarder specializing in snowboard cross.

== Career ==
Wilson represented Australia at the 2024 Winter Youth Olympics and won a bronze medal in the mixed team snowboard cross event. She also finished in fourth place in the snowboard cross event.

In January 2026, she was selected to represent Australia at the 2026 Winter Olympics.

== Personal life ==
Her older sister, Charlotte, is an Olympic freestyle skier.
