= Sina Siegenthaler =

Swiss snowboarder (born 2000)

Personal information
- Born: 27 September 2000 (age 25) Schangnau, Switzerland

Sport
- Country: Switzerland
- Sport: Snowboarding
- Event: Snowboard cross
Medal record
Women's snowboarding
Representing Switzerland
World Championships
Bronze medal – third place	2025 Engadin	Mixed snowboard team cross

Sina Siegenthaler (born 27 September 2000) is a Swiss snowboarder who specializes in snowboard cross.

== Career ==
Siegenthaler represented Switzerland at the 2025 Snowboarding World Championships and won a bronze medal in the mixed snowboard team cross event, along with Valerio Jud. She also competed in the snowboard cross event, where she had the fastest time during qualification, however, she finished in eighth place.
