= Brianna Schnorrbusch =

American snowboarder (born 2006)

Personal information
- Born: January 30, 2006 (age 20) Monroe Township, New Jersey, U.S.

Sport
- Country: United States
- Sport: Snowboarding
- Event: Snowboard cross
Medal record
Women's snowboarding
Representing the United States
Junior World Championships
Silver medal – second place	2022 Veysonnaz	Snowboard cross
Bronze medal – third place	2025 Isola 2000	Mixed team snowboard cross

Brianna Schnorrbusch (born January 30, 2006) is an American snowboarder specializing in snowboard cross. She represented the United States at the 2026 Winter Olympics.

== Career ==
Schnorrbusch made her FIS Snowboard World Championships debut in 2023. She then represented the United States at the 2024 Winter Youth Olympics in snowboard cross and mixed team snowboard cross.

In March 2025, she competed at the 2025 Snowboarding World Championships in the snowboard cross event and was eliminated in the quarterfinals. She then competed at the 2025 FIS Snowboarding Junior World Championships and won a bronze medal in the mixed team snowboard cross event, along with Nathan Pare.

In January 2026, she was selected to represent the United States at the 2026 Winter Olympics.

== Personal life ==
Her sister, Ty Schnorrbusch, competes in slopestyle snowboarding.
