= Noémie Wiedmer =

Swiss snowboarder (born 2007)

Personal information
- Born: 1 May 2007 (age 19) Diemtigen, Switzerland

Sport
- Country: Switzerland
- Sport: Snowboarding
- Event: Snowboard cross
Medal record
Women's snowboarding
Representing Switzerland
Winter Youth Olympics
Gold medal – first place	2024 Gangwon	Snowboard cross
Junior World Championships
Silver medal – second place	2024 Gudauri	Snowboard cross

Noémie Wiedmer (born 1 May 2007) is a Swiss snowboarder who specializes in snowboard cross.

== Career ==
In January 2024, Wiedmer represented Switzerland at the 2024 Winter Youth Olympics and won a gold medal in the snowboard cross. In April 2024, she then competed at the FIS Snowboarding Junior World Championships and won a silver medal in the snowboard cross event. She was named the Rookie of the Year at the Swiss-Ski Awards.

In January 2026, she was selected to represent Switzerland at the 2026 Winter Olympics. She placed 4th in the women's snowboard cross.
