= Maja-Li Iafrate Danielsson =

French snowboarder (born 2006)

Personal information
- Born: 5 October 2006 (age 19) La Tronche, France

Sport
- Country: France
- Sport: Snowboarding
- Event: Snowboard cross
Medal record
Women's snowboarding
Representing France
Winter Youth Olympics
Silver medal – second place	2024 Gangwon	Snowboard cross
Silver medal – second place	2024 Gangwon	Mixed team snowboard cross

Maja-Li Iafrate Danielsson (born 5 October 2006) is a French snowboarder who specializes in snowboard cross.

== Career ==
In January 2024, Danielsson represented France at the 2024 Winter Youth Olympics and won a silver medal in the snowboard cross and mixed team snowboard cross events.

In January 2026, she was selected to represent France at the 2026 Winter Olympics.

== Personal life ==
Born in France, Danielsson is of Sicilian and Swedish descent.
