= Jonas Chollet =

French snowboarder (born 2008)

Personal information
- Born: 5 November 2008 (age 17) Gap, Hautes-Alpes, France

Sport
- Country: France
- Sport: Snowboarding
- Event: Snowboard cross
Medal record
Men's snowboarding
Representing France
Winter Youth Olympics
Gold medal – first place	2024 Gangwon	Snowboard cross
Gold medal – first place	2024 Gangwon	Mixed team snowboard cross

Jonas Chollet (born 5 November 2008) is a French snowboarder specializing in snowboard cross.

== Career ==
In January 2024, Chollet represented France at the 2024 Winter Youth Olympics and won a gold medal in the snowboard cross and mixed team snowboard cross events.

In April 2025, he competed at the FIS Snowboarding Junior World Championships where he won gold medals in the snowboard cross and snowboard cross team events. During the 2025–26 FIS Snowboard World Cup he won the snowboard cross event in his World Cup debut on 13 December 2025.

In January 2026, he was selected to represent France at the 2026 Winter Olympics. He competed in the snowboard cross event, and finished in sixth place.

== Personal life ==
His older brother, Aidan, is also a snowboarder.
