= Josie Baff =

Australian snowboarder (born 2003)

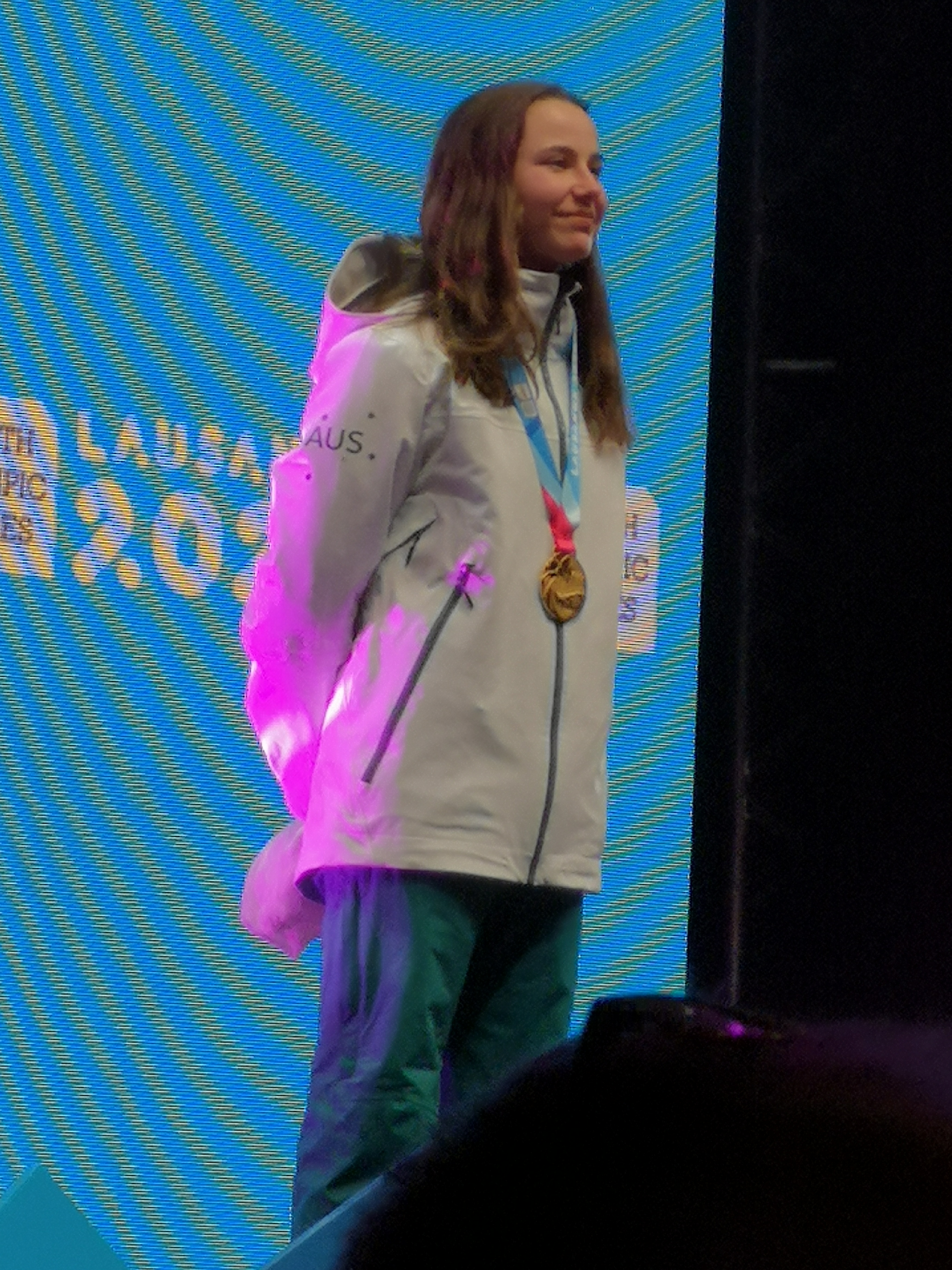
- Baff in 2020

Personal information
- Full name: Josephine Louise Baff
- Born: 25 January 2003 (age 23) Cooma, New South Wales, Australia

Sport
- Country: Australia
- Sport: Snowboarding
- Event: Snowboard cross
- Turned pro: 2021

World Cup career
- Seasons: 6 (2020–2026)
- Indiv. starts: 40
- Indiv. podiums: 16
- Indiv. wins: 2
- Team starts: 4
- Team podiums: 2
- Team wins: 1
Medal record
Women's snowboarding
Representing Australia
World Cup race podiums
Event	1st	2nd	3rd
Snowboard cross	2	5	7
Team snowboard cross	1	1	0
Total	3	6	7
International snowboard competitions
Event	1st	2nd	3rd
Olympic Games	1	0	0
World Championships	0	1	0
Total	1	1	0
Olympic Games
Gold medal – first place	2026 Milano Cortina	Snowboard cross
World Championships
Silver medal – second place	2023 Bakuriani	Snowboard cross
Youth Olympic Games
Gold medal – first place	2020 Lausanne	Snowboard cross
- Updated on 20 February 2026

Josephine Louise Baff (born 25 January 2003 in Cooma, New South Wales) is an Australian Olympic champion snowboarder who specialises in snowboard cross. She represented Australia at the 2022 and 2026 Winter Olympics, winning the women's snowboard cross in 2026.

She also competed in and won the gold medal at the 2020 Winter Youth Olympics, made her professional debut at the 2021–22 FIS Snowboard World Cup, and won the silver medal at the 2023 Freestyle Ski and Snowboarding World Championships.

== Early career ==
Baff began skiing at age two and learnt how to ski at five years old. Her father was a ski instructor and ran snowboard camps of which Baff attended, as the family would do back-to-back seasons between Australia and Europe/America.

Baff earned podium finishes in the 2019 Canadian Junior nationals (first), 2019 Australian New Zealand Cup (second) and 2019 NorAm (third). She then attended the 2020 Winter Youth Olympics in Lausanne, Switzerland and claimed the gold medal in the snowboard cross event. This was the first gold medal by an Australian at the Youth Olympic Winter Games.

She received a scholarship in 2020 into the Sport Australia Hall of Fame Scholarship and Mentoring Program, being paired with champion swimmer Susie O'Neill.

== Career ==
=== World Cup debut ===
Baff began her professional career in the 2020–21 FIS Snowboard World Cup competing in fourth round at Bakuriani, Georgia in her only appearance of the season. She finished 15th to earn her first World Cup points.

Baff began the 2021–22 FIS Snowboard World Cup in the second round at Montafon, Austria finishing ninth. She recorded a second top ten finish in Krasnoyarsk, Russia, with another ninth place in the fourth round. She then finished the season with a seventh place finish in Veysonnaz, Switzerland. In total, Baff competed in 6 of the 8 events of the World Cup season.

=== 2022 Olympic Winter Games ===
Following this breakout season in the World Cup, Baff qualified for the 2022 Olympic Winter Games in Beijing. She came 18th in her individual event and 13th in the mixed team event, partnering Adam Lambert.

== Results ==
=== Olympic Winter Games ===
As of 16 February 2026

Year	Age	Individual snowboard cross	Mixed team snowboard cross
(China) 2022 Beijing	19	18	13
(Italy) 2026 Milano Cortina	23	1	4

=== World Championships ===
As of 16 February 2026

Year	Age	Individual snowboard cross	Mixed team snowboard cross
(Georgia (country)) 2023 Bakuriani	20	2	9
(Switzerland) 2025 Engadin	22	7	6

=== World Cup results by season ===
The table below shows Baff's result per World Cup season in individual snowboard cross events. It does not include results in any team events competed in during World Cup events.

As of 16 February 2026

Season	Events started	Best finish	Wins	Podiums	Points	Rank
2020–21	1/6	15	0	0	16.00	35
2021–22	6/8	7	0	0	133.00	16
2022–23	9/9	1	2	4	493.00	3rd place, bronze medalist(s)
2023–24	12/12	2	0	5	608.00	4
2024–25	9/10	2	0	3	458.00	4
2025–26	3/3	2	0	2	185.00	2

=== World Cup victories ===
The table below shows all World Cup victories across individual and team World Cup events.

As of 16 February 2026

No.	Date	Location	Discipline
1	4 December 2022	Les Deux Alpes, France	Women's Individual
2	26 March 2023	Mont-Sainte-Anne, Canada	Women's Individual
3	2 March 2025	Erzurum, Turkey	Team
