= 2015–16 FIS Snowboard World Cup =

International snowboarding competition

Snowboard World Cup 2015/16
Discipline	Men	Women
Parallel overall	(Bulgaria) Radoslav Yankov	(Czech Republic) Ester Ledecká
Parallel giant slalom	(Russia) Andrey Sobolev	(Czech Republic) Ester Ledecká
Parallel slalom	(Italy) Roland Fischnaller	(Switzerland) Patrizia Kummer
Freestyle overall	(Japan) Ryō Aono	(United States) Jamie Anderson
Snowboard Cross	(France) Pierre Vaultier	(Italy) Michela Moioli
Halfpipe	(Japan) Ryō Aono	(China) Cai Xuetong
Slopestyle	(United States) Chris Corning	(United States) Jamie Anderson
Big Air	(Canada) Max Parrot	(United States) Jamie Anderson (United States) Julia Marino

Competition
Locations	26	26
Individual	31	31
Team	5	5

The 2015/16 FIS Snowboard World Cup is 22nd multi race season in snowboarding. Competition consists of the parallel slalom, parallel giant slalom, snowboard cross, halfpipe, slopestyle and big air.

== Calendar: Men ==
=== Parallel ===
No.	Season	Date	Place	Event	Winner	Second	Third	Det.
	1	12 December 2015	(Italy) Carezza	PGS	(Bulgaria) Radoslav Yankov	(Russia) Andrey Sobolev	(Switzerland) Nevin Galmarini
	2	23 January 2016	(Slovenia) Rogla	PGS	(Russia) Andrey Sobolev	(Bulgaria) Radoslav Yankov	(Russia) Vic Wild
	3	27 February 2016	(Turkey) Kayseri	PGS	(Austria) Andreas Prommegger	(Slovenia) Rok Marguč	(Germany) Patrick Bussler
	1	19 December 2015 (Note: Snowboard cross event for men cancelled in Cortina d'Ampezzo on 19 December because of insufficient snow was replaced with parallel slalom event on the same place and the same date.)	(Italy) Cortina d'Ampezzo	PSL	(Italy) Christoph Mick	(Italy) Roland Fischnaller	(Italy) Mirko Felicetti
	2	8 January 2016	(Austria) Bad Gastein	PSL	(Bulgaria) Radoslav Yankov	(Italy) Maurizio Bormolini	(Italy) Mirko Felicetti
	3	30 January 2016	(Russia) Moscow	PSL	(Italy) Roland Fischnaller	(Austria) Benjamin Karl	(Slovenia) Rok Marguč
		13 February 2016	(Austria) Jauerling	PSL	organizational issues
	4	6 March 2016	(Germany) Winterberg	PSL	(Italy) Edwin Coratti	(Italy) Roland Fischnaller	(Slovenia) Rok Marguč

=== Snowboard Cross ===
No.	Season	Date	Place	Event	Winner	Second	Third	Det.
134	1	12 December 2015	(Austria) Montafon	SBX	(Austria) Alessandro Hämmerle	(Austria) Markus Schairer	(Russia) Nikolay Olyunin
		19 December 2015	(Italy) Cortina d'Ampezzo	SBX	insufficient snow; replaced with parallel slalom
135	2	23 January 2016	(Germany) Feldberg	SBX	(Russia) Nikolay Olyunin	(France) Pierre Vaultier	(Australia) Alex Pullin
136	3	24 January 2016	(Germany) Feldberg	SBX	(France) Pierre Vaultier	(Russia) Nikolay Olyunin	(Andorra) Lluís Marin Tarroch
137	4	20 February 2016	(Russia) Sunny Valley, Miass	SBX	(France) Pierre Vaultier	(Canada) Christopher Robanske	(Spain) Lucas Eguibar
138	5	27 February 2016	(South Korea) Bogwang/Pyeongchang	SBX	(United States) Nate Holland	(France) Pierre Vaultier	(United States) Nick Baumgartner
139	6	5 March 2016	(Switzerland) Veysonnaz	SBX	(Canada) Baptiste Brochu	(France) Pierre Vaultier	(Austria) Alessandro Hämmerle
140	6	6 March 2016	(Switzerland) Veysonnaz	SBX	(Spain) Lucas Eguibar	(United States) Nick Baumgartner	(Austria) Alessandro Hämmerle
		12 March 2016	(United States) Squaw Valley	SBX	organizational issues
141	7	20 March 2016	(Spain) Baqueira Beret	SBX	(Australia) Alex Pullin	(Canada) Kevin Hill	(Spain) Lucas Eguibar

=== Big Air ===
No.	Season	Date	Place	Event	Winner	Second	Third	Det.
		14 November 2015	(United Kingdom) London	BA	cancelled
		28 November 2015	(South Korea) Seoul	BA	cancelled
		19 December 2015	(Turkey) Istanbul	BA	cancelled
61	1	11 February 2016	(United States) Boston	BA	(Canada) Max Parrot	(Canada) Michael Ciccarelli	(United States) Chas Guldemond
62	2	13 February 2016	(Canada) Quebec City	BA	(Canada) Max Parrot	(Canada) Tyler Nicholson	(United States) Ryan Stassel

=== Slopestyle ===
No.	Season	Date	Place	Event	Winner	Second	Third	Det.
14	1	22 August 2015	(New Zealand) Cardrona	SBS	(United States) Chris Corning	(Japan) Yuki Kadono	(Canada) Michael Ciccarelli
15	2	21 January 2016	(United States) Mammoth Mountain	SBS	(United States) Brandon Davis	(United States) Eric Willett	(United States) Chas Guldemond
16	3	21 February 2016	(South Korea) Bogwang/Pyeongchang	SBS	(United States) Brock Crouch	(Belgium) Seppe Smits	(Finland) Ville Paumola
17	4	20 March 2016	(Czech Republic) Špindlerův Mlýn	SBS	(United Kingdom) Jamie Nicholls	(United States) Chris Corning	(United Kingdom) Billy Morgan

=== Halfpipe ===
No.	Season	Date	Place	Event	Winner	Second	Third	Det.
162	1	30 August 2015 (Note: Halfpipe event for men in Cardrona rescheduled from 29 to 30 August.)	(New Zealand) Cardrona	HP	(Japan) Raibu Katayama	(Japan) Taku Hiraoka	(Switzerland) Iouri Podladtchikov
163	2	24 January 2016	(United States) Mammoth Mountain	HP	(Japan) Ryō Aono	(United States) Chase Josey	(United States) Gabe Ferguson
164	3	6 February 2016	(United States) Park City	HP	(United States) Matt Ladley	(Japan) Ryō Aono	(Japan) Naito Ando
165	4	14 February 2016	(Japan) Sapporo	HP	(Japan) Ryō Aono	(Finland) Markus Malin	(Japan) Raibu Katayama

== Calendar: Ladies ==
=== Parallel ===
No.	Season	Date	Place	Event	Winner	Second	Third	Det.
	1	12 December 2015	(Italy) Carezza	PGS	(Czech Republic) Ester Ledecká	(Switzerland) Ladina Jenny	(Russia) Yekaterina Tudegesheva
	2	23 January 2016	(Slovenia) Rogla	PGS	(Czech Republic) Ester Ledecká	(Austria) Marion Kreiner	(Russia) Yekaterina Tudegesheva
	3	27 February 2016	(Turkey) Kayseri	PGS	(Czech Republic) Ester Ledecká	(Austria) Sabine Schöffmann	(Austria) Ina Meschik
	1	19 December 2015 (Note: Snowboard cross event for ladies cancelled in Cortina d'Ampezzo on 19 December because of insufficient snow was replaced with parallel slalom event on the same place and the same date.)	(Italy) Cortina d'Ampezzo	PSL	(Switzerland) Patrizia Kummer	(Italy) Nadya Ochner	(Germany) Cheyenne Loch
	2	8 January 2016	(Austria) Bad Gastein	PSL	(Russia) Yekaterina Tudegesheva	(Austria) Julia Dujmovits	(Austria) Sabine Schöffmann
	3	30 January 2016	(Russia) Moscow	PSL	(Switzerland) Patrizia Kummer	(Switzerland) Ladina Jenny	(Czech Republic) Ester Ledecká
		13 February 2016	(Austria) Jauerling	PSL	organizational issues
	4	6 March 2016	(Germany) Winterberg	PSL	(Russia) Alena Zavarzina	(Austria) Ina Meschik	(Germany) Ramona Hofmeister

=== Snowboard Cross ===
No.	Season	Date	Place	Event	Winner	Second	Third	Det.
133	1	12 December 2015	(Austria) Montafon	SBX	(France) Nelly Moenne Loccoz	(United States) Lindsey Jacobellis	(Russia) Mariya Vasiltsova
		19 December 2015	(Italy) Cortina d'Ampezzo	SBX	insufficient snow; replaced with parallel slalom
134	1	23 January 2016	(Germany) Feldberg	SBX	(Czech Republic) Eva Samková	(Italy) Michela Moioli	(France) Chloé Trespeuch
135	2	24 January 2016	(Germany) Feldberg	SBX	(France) Nelly Moenne Loccoz	(France) Chloé Trespeuch	(Italy) Michela Moioli
136	3	21 February 2016	(Russia) Sunny Valley, Miass	SBX	(Czech Republic) Eva Samková	(Australia) Belle Brockhoff	(Italy) Michela Moioli
137	4	27 February 2016	(South Korea) Bogwang/Pyeongchang	SBX	(France) Chloé Trespeuch	(Italy) Michela Moioli	(Czech Republic) Eva Samková
138	5	5 March 2016	(Switzerland) Veysonnaz	SBX	(Bulgaria) Alexandra Jekova	(Australia) Belle Brockhoff	(Czech Republic) Eva Samková
139	6	6 March 2016	(Switzerland) Veysonnaz	SBX	(Italy) Michela Moioli	(United States) Lindsey Jacobellis	(France) Nelly Moenne Loccoz
		12 March 2016	(United States) Squaw Valley	SBX	organizational issues
140	7	20 March 2016	(Spain) Baqueira Beret	SBX	(Australia) Belle Brockhoff	(Czech Republic) Eva Samková	(France) Chloé Trespeuch

=== Big Air ===
No.	Season	Date	Place	Event	Winner	Second	Third	Det.
		14 November 2015	(United Kingdom) London	BA	cancelled
		28 November 2015	(South Korea) Seoul	BA	cancelled
		19 December 2015	(Turkey) Istanbul	BA	cancelled
3	1	11 February 2016	(United States) Boston	BA	(United States) Julia Marino	(Canada) Jenna Blasman	(Canada) Brooke Voigt
4	2	13 February 2016	(Canada) Quebec City	BA	(United States) Jamie Anderson	(United Kingdom) Katie Ormerod	(Spain) Queralt Castellet

=== Slopestyle ===
No.	Season	Date	Place	Event	Winner	Second	Third	Det.
14	1	22 August 2015	(New Zealand) Cardrona	SBS	(United States) Jamie Anderson	(Canada) Laurie Blouin	(United States) Hailey Langland
15	2	23 January 2016	(United States) Mammoth Mountain	SBS	(Hungary) Anna Gyarmati	(United States) Jessika Jenson	(United States) Karly Shorr
16	3	21 February 2016	(South Korea) Bogwang/Pyeongchang	SBS	(United States) Jamie Anderson	(United States) Karly Shorr	(New Zealand) Christy Prior
17	4	20 March 2016	(Czech Republic) Špindlerův Mlýn	SBS	(Germany) Silvia Mittermüller	(United Kingdom) Katie Ormerod	(Czech Republic) Šárka Pančochová

=== Halfpipe ===
No.	Season	Date	Place	Event	Winner	Second	Third	Det.
162	1	30 August 2015 (Note: Halfpipe event for ladies in Cardrona rescheduled from 29 to 30 August.)	(New Zealand) Cardrona	HP	(China) Cai Xuetong	(Japan) Hikaru Oe	(France) Sophie Rodriguez
163	2	24 January 2016	(United States) Mammoth Mountain	HP	(United States) Kelly Clark	(United States) Chloe Kim	(United States) Maddie Mastro
164	3	6 February 2016	(United States) Park City	HP	(United States) Chloe Kim	(United States) Maddie Mastro	(United States) Kelly Clark
165	4	14 February 2016	(Japan) Sapporo	HP	(China) Cai Xuetong	(China) Liu Jiayu	(France) Clémence Grimal

== Calendar: Team events ==
=== Snowboard cross men ===
No.	Season	Date	Place	Event	Winner	Second	Third	Det.
	1	13 December 2015	(Austria) Montafon	SBXT	France I Pierre Vaultier; Tony Ramoin	Italy II Fabio Cordi; Luca Matteotti	Austria I Alessandro Hämmerle; Markus Schairer

=== Snowboard cross ladies ===
No.	Season	Date	Place	Event	Winner	Second	Third	Det.
	1	13 December 2015	(Austria) Montafon	SBXT	France I Nelly Moenne Loccoz; Chloé Trespeuch	United States I Lindsey Jacobellis; Faye Gulini	Switzerland I Simona Meiler; Alexandra Hasler

=== Parallel mixed ===
No.	Season	Date	Place	Event	Winner	Second	Third	Det.
	1	9 January 2016	(Austria) Bad Gastein	PSLT	Austria II Sabine Schöffmann; Alexander Payer	Germany II Selina Jörg; Stefan Baumeister	Russia II Alena Zavarzina; Vic Wild
		14 February 2016	(Austria) Jauerling	PSLT	cancelled

== Standings: Men ==
=== Parallel overall (PSL/PGS) ===
Rank		Points
1	(Bulgaria) Radoslav Yankov	4050
2	(Italy) Roland Fischnaller	3620
3	(Russia) Andrey Sobolev	3046
4	(Austria) Andreas Prommegger	2940
5	(Slovenia) Rok Marguč	2790

- Standings after 7 races.

=== Parallel slalom ===
Rank		Points
1	(Italy) Roland Fischnaller	2860
2	(Italy) Mirko Felicetti	2050
3	(Bulgaria) Radoslav Yankov	1890
4	(Italy) Edwin Coratti	1848
5	(Italy) Christoph Mick	1664

- Standings after 4 races.

=== Parallel giant slalom ===
Rank		Points
1	(Russia) Andrey Sobolev	2300
2	(Bulgaria) Radoslav Yankov	2160
3	(Austria) Andreas Prommegger	1680
4	(Switzerland) Nevin Galmarini	1340
5	(Slovenia) Rok Marguč	1270

- Standings after 3 races.

=== Snowboard Cross ===
Rank		Points
1	(France) Pierre Vaultier	5140
2	(Austria) Alessandro Hämmerle	3840
3	(Spain) Lucas Eguibar	3366
4	(Russia) Nikolay Olyunin	3180
5	(Australia) Alex Pullin	3163

- Standings after 8 races.

=== Freestyle overall (BA/SBS/HP) ===
Rank		Points
1	(Japan) Ryō Aono	3250
2	(United States) Chris Corning	2520
3	(Canada) Max Parrot	2000
4	(Canada) Max Eberhardt	1930
5	(United States) Ryan Stassel	1852

- Standings after 10 races.

=== Big Air ===
Rank		Points
1	(Canada) Max Parrot	2000
2	(Canada) Tyler Nicholson	930
3	(Belgium) Seppe Smits	900
4	(Canada) Michael Ciccarelli	800
5	(France) Sebastien Konijnenberg	650

- Standings after 2 races.

=== Slopestyle ===
Rank		Points
1	(United States) Chris Corning	2520
2	(United States) Brandon Davis	1630
3	(Canada) Max Eberhardt	1610
4	(United States) Brock Crouch	1340
5	(United Kingdom) Jamie Nicholls	1220

- Standings after 4 races.

=== Halfpipe ===
Rank		Points
1	(Japan) Ryō Aono	3250
2	(Japan) Raibu Katayama	1750
3	(United States) Chase Josey	1130
4	(Japan) Taku Hiraoka	1120
5	(United States) Matt Ladley	1000

- Standings after 4 races.

== Standings:Ladies ==
=== Parallel overall (PSL/PGS) ===
Rank		Points
1	(Czech Republic) Ester Ledecka	4750
2	(Russia) Ekaterina Tudegesheva	3720
3	(Switzerland) Patrizia Kummer	3530
4	(Switzerland) Ladina Jenny	3130
5	(Austria) Ina Meschik	3010

- Standings after 7 races.

=== Parallel slalom ===
Rank		Points
1	(Switzerland) Patrizia Kummer	2770
2	(Russia) Ekaterina Tudegesheva	2020
3	(Austria) Ina Meschik	1870
4	(Switzerland) Ladina Jenny	1820
5	(Czech Republic) Ester Ledecká	1750

- Standings after 4 races.

=== Parallel giant slalom ===
Rank		Points
1	(Czech Republic) Ester Ledecká	3000
2	(Russia) Ekaterina Tudegesheva	1700
3	(Austria) Marion Kreiner	1400
4	(Switzerland) Ladina Jenny	1310
5	(Switzerland) Julie Zogg	1190

- Standings after 3 races.

=== Snowboard Cross ===
Rank		Points
1	(Italy) Michela Moioli	5100
2	(Czech Republic) Eva Samková	5060
3	(Australia) Belle Brockhoff	4460
4	(France) Chloé Trespeuch	4260
5	(France) Nelly Moenne Loccoz	4220

- Standings after 8 races.

=== Freestyle overall (BA/SBS/HP) ===
Rank		Points
1	(United States) Jamie Anderson	3360
2	(China) Cai Xuetong	2500
3	(United Kingdom) Katie Ormerod	2390
4	(United States) Karly Shorr	2250
5	(United States) Kelly Clark	2000

- Standings after 10 races.

=== Big Air ===
Rank		Points
1	(United States) Jamie Anderson	1360
1	(United States) Julia Marino	1360
3	(Canada) Jenna Blasman	1090
3	(United Kingdom) Katie Ormerod	1090
5	(Canada) Brooke Voigt	840

- Standings after 2 races.

=== Slopestyle ===
Rank		Points
1	(United States) Jamie Anderson	2000
2	(United States) Karly Shorr	1850
3	(Germany) Silvia Mittermueller	1660
4	(United States) Jessika Jenson	1400
5	(United Kingdom) Katie Ormerod	1300

- Standings after 4 races.

=== Halfpipe ===
Rank		Points
1	(China) Cai Xuetong	2500
2	(United States) Kelly Clark	2000
3	(United States) Chloe Kim	1800
4	(China) Liu Jiayu	1570
5	(Japan) Hikaru Oe	1470

- Standings after 4 races

== Podium table by nation ==
Table showing the World Cup podium places (gold–1st place, silver–2nd place, bronze–3rd place) by the countries represented by the athletes.

Rank	Nation	Gold	Silver	Bronze	Total
1	United States	11	11	9	31
2	France	7	4	5	16
3	Czech Republic	5	1	4	10
4	Italy	4	7	4	15
5	Russia	4	2	6	12
6	Austria	3	6	5	14
7	Canada	3	6	2	11
8	Japan	3	4	2	9
9	Bulgaria	3	1	0	4
10	Switzerland	2	2	3	7
11	Australia	2	2	1	5
12	China	2	1	0	3
13	Great Britain	1	2	1	4
14	Germany	1	1	3	5
15	Spain	1	0	3	4
16	Hungary	1	0	0	1
17	Slovenia	0	1	2	3
18	Finland	0	1	1	2
19	Belgium	0	1	0	1
20	Andorra	0	0	1	1
20	New Zealand	0	0	1	1
Totals (21 entries)		53	53	53	159
