= 2017–18 FIS Snowboard World Cup =

International snowboarding competition

2017–18 FIS Snowboard World Cup (leading)
Discipline	Men	Women
Parallel overall	(Switzerland) Nevin Galmarini	(Czech Republic) Ester Ledecká
Parallel giant slalom	(Switzerland) Nevin Galmarini	(Czech Republic) Ester Ledecká
Parallel slalom	(Italy) Roland Fischnaller	(Russia) Ekaterina Tudegesheva
Freestyle overall	(United States) Chris Corning	(Japan) Miyabi Onitsuka
Snowboard cross	(France) Pierre Vaultier	(Italy) Michela Moioli
Halfpipe	(Japan) Yūto Totsuka	(United States) Chloe Kim
Slopestyle	(United States) Chris Corning	(Russia) Sofya Fyodorova
Big Air	(United States) Chris Corning	(Austria) Anna Gasser

Competition
Locations	29	29
Individual	39	39
Team	3	3
Mixed	3	3
Cancelled	1	1

The 2017–18 FIS Snowboard World Cup was the 24th World Cup season in snowboarding organised by International Ski Federation. The season started on 4 September 2017 in Cardrona, New Zealand and concluded on 24 March 2018 in Quebec City, Canada. Competitions consisted of parallel slalom, parallel giant slalom, snowboard cross, halfpipe, slopestyle and big air.

== Men ==
=== Snowboard Cross ===
Date	Place	Event	Winner	Second	Third	Ref.
9 September 2017	(Argentina) Cerro Catedral	SBX	(Australia) Alex Pullin	(Italy) Emanuel Perathoner	(United States) Jonathan Cheever	
10 September 2017	(Argentina) Cerro Catedral	SBX	(Australia) Alex Pullin	(Austria) Alessandro Hämmerle	(United States) Mick Dierdorff	
13 December 2017	(France) Val Thorens	SBX	(Germany) Paul Berg	(Australia) Adam Lambert	(Spain) Lucas Eguibar	
16 December 2017	(Austria) Montafon	SBX	(Australia) Jarryd Hughes	(Austria) Alessandro Hämmerle	(Austria) Markus Schairer	
22 December 2017	(Italy) Cervinia	SBX	(Italy) Omar Visintin	(France) Pierre Vaultier	(Australia) Alex Pullin	
20 January 2018	(Turkey) Erzurum	SBX	(Italy) Omar Visintin	(France) Pierre Vaultier	(Austria) Alessandro Hämmerle	
27 January 2018	(Bulgaria) Bansko (sprint)	SBX	(France) Pierre Vaultier	(Canada) Chris Robanske	(Austria) Alessandro Hämmerle	
3 February 2018	(Germany) Feldberg	SBX	(Austria) Julian Lüftner	(France) Pierre Vaultier	(France) Ken Vuagnoux	
4 February 2018	(Germany) Feldberg	SBX	(France) Pierre Vaultier	(Italy) Michele Godino	(Germany) Paul Berg	
3 March 2018	(Spain) La Molina	SBX	(Austria) Alessandro Hämmerle	(Austria) Hanno Douschan	(Italy) Emanuel Perathoner	
10 March 2018	(Russia) Moscow	SBX	(Austria) Alessandro Hämmerle	(France) Pierre Vaultier	(Italy) Omar Visintin	
17 March 2018	(Switzerland) Veysonnaz	SBX	(United States) Nate Holland	(United States) Mick Dierdorff	(Spain) Lucas Eguibar	

=== Parallel ===
Date	Place	Event	Winner	Second	Third	Ref.
14 December 2017	(Italy) Carezza	PGS	(Russia) Andrey Sobolev	(Switzerland) Nevin Galmarini	(Switzerland) Dario Caviezel	
15 December 2017	(Italy) Cortina d'Ampezzo	PGS	(Austria) Alexander Payer	(Italy) Roland Fischnaller	(France) Sylvain Dufour	
16 December 2017	(Italy) Cortina d'Ampezzo (night)	PSL	(Italy) Roland Fischnaller	(Italy) Edwin Coratti	(Russia) Dmitry Loginov	
5 January 2018	(Austria) Lackenhof	PGS	(Switzerland) Nevin Galmarini	(Slovenia) Rok Marguč	(Austria) Alexander Payer	
12 January 2018	(Austria) Bad Gastein	PSL	(Russia) Dmitry Loginov	(Russia) Andrey Sobolev	(Italy) Maurizio Bormolini	
20 January 2018	(Slovenia) Rogla	PGS	(Austria) Andreas Prommegger	(Italy) Edwin Coratti	(Austria) Benjamin Karl	
21 January 2018	(Slovenia) Rogla	PGS	(Austria) Benjamin Karl	(Bulgaria) Radoslav Yankov	(Italy) Roland Fischnaller	
26 January 2018	(Bulgaria) Bansko	PGS	(Canada) Jasey-Jay Anderson	(Switzerland) Nevin Galmarini	(Italy) Edwin Coratti	
28 January 2018	(Bulgaria) Bansko	PGS	(Switzerland) Nevin Galmarini	(Italy) Edwin Coratti	(Austria) Andreas Prommegger	
3 March 2018	(Turkey) Kayseri	PGS	(Germany) Stefan Baumeister	(Italy) Edwin Coratti	(Slovenia) Tim Mastnak	
10 March 2018	(Switzerland) Scuol	PGS	(Slovenia) Tim Mastnak	(Poland) Oskar Kwiatkowski	(Switzerland) Nevin Galmarini	
17 March 2018	(Germany) Winterberg	PSL	(Italy) Roland Fischnaller	(Austria) Sebastian Kislinger	(Slovenia) Rok Marguč	

=== Big Air ===
Date	Place	Event	Winner	Second	Third	Ref.
4 November 2017	(Denmark) Copenhagen	BA	cancelled due to organizational issues			
11 November 2017	(Italy) Milan	BA	(United States) Chris Corning	(United States) Redmond Gerard	(United States) Kyle Mack	
25 November 2017	(China) Beijing	BA	(Canada) Mark McMorris	(New Zealand) Tiarn Collins	(Norway) Torgeir Bergrem	
2 December 2017	(Germany) Mönchengladbach	BA	(Norway) Marcus Kleveland	(Japan) Yūri Ōkubo	(Finland) Kalle Järvilehto	
10 December 2017	(United States) Cooper Mountain	BA	(Norway) Mons Røisland	(United States) Chris Corning	(United States) Chandler Hunt	
24 March 2018	(Canada) Stoneham/Quebec City	BA	(Canada) Max Parrot	(Switzerland) Jonas Bösiger	(Canada) Antoine Truchon	

=== Halfpipe ===
Date	Place	Event	Winner	Second	Third	Ref.
8 September 2017	(New Zealand) Cardrona	HP	(Japan) Yūto Totsuka	(Japan) Ayumu Hirano	(Switzerland) Patrick Burgener	
9 December 2017	(United States) Cooper Mountain	HP	(Japan) Ayumu Hirano	(United States) Ben Ferguson	(United States) Shaun White	
21 December 2017	(China) Beijing/Secret Garden	HP	(Japan) Ayumu Hirano	(Japan) Raibu Katayama	(Japan) Yūto Totsuka	
13 January 2018	(United States) Snowmass	HP	(United States) Shaun White	(Australia) Scotty James	(Japan) Yūto Totsuka	
20 January 2018	(Switzerland) Laax	HP	(Switzerland) Iouri Podladtchikov	(Japan) Yūto Totsuka	(China) Zhang Yiwei	

=== Slopestyle ===
Date	Place	Event	Winner	Second	Third	Ref.
4 September 2017	(New Zealand) Cardrona	SBS	(Norway) Marcus Kleveland	(Canada) Darcy Sharpe	(New Zealand) Carlos Garcia Knight	
12 January 2018	(United States) Snowmass	SBS	(United States) Redmond Gerard	(Japan) Hiroaki Kunitake	(New Zealand) Tiarn Collins	
19 January 2018	(Switzerland) Laax	SBS	cancelled due to snow fall, gusty side winds and low visibility			
17 March 2018	(Italy) Seiser Alm	SBS	(United States) Chris Corning	(Norway) Fridtjof Tischendorf	(United States) Lyon Farrell	

== Ladies ==
=== Snowboard Cross ===
Date	Place	Event	Winner	Second	Third	Ref.
9 September 2017	(Argentina) Cerro Catedral	SBX	(France) Chloé Trespeuch	(United States) Lindsey Jacobellis	(France) Nelly Moenne Loccoz	
10 September 2017	(Argentina) Cerro Catedral	SBX	(United States) Lindsey Jacobellis	(Czech Republic) Eva Samková	(France) Chloé Trespeuch	
13 December 2017	(France) Val Thorens	SBX	(United States) Lindsey Jacobellis	(France) Chloé Trespeuch	(Italy) Michela Moioli	
16 December 2017	(Austria) Montafon	SBX	(Italy) Michela Moioli	(United States) Faye Gulini	(France) Nelly Moenne Loccoz	
22 December 2017	(Italy) Cervinia	SBX	(Italy) Michela Moioli	(France) Nelly Moenne Loccoz	(France) Julia Pereira de Sousa Mabileau	
20 January 2018	(Turkey) Erzurum	SBX	(Czech Republic) Eva Samková	(France) Chloé Trespeuch	(Italy) Michela Moioli	
27 January 2018	(Bulgaria) Bansko	SBX	(France) Charlotte Bankes	(Italy) Michela Moioli	(France) Nelly Moenne Loccoz	
3 February 2018	(Germany) Feldberg	SBX	(Italy) Michela Moioli	(Canada) Zoe Bergermann	(France) Julia Pereira de Sousa Mabileau	
4 February 2018	(Germany) Feldberg	SBX	(Italy) Michela Moioli	(France) Charlotte Bankes	(France) Chloé Trespeuch	
3 March 2018	(Spain) La Molina	SBX	(Czech Republic) Eva Samková	(France) Nelly Moenne Loccoz	(France) Charlotte Bankes	
10 March 2018	(Russia) Moscow	SBX	(Czech Republic) Eva Samková	(Italy) Michela Moioli	(France) Charlotte Bankes	
17 March 2018	(Switzerland) Veysonnaz	SBX	(Italy) Michela Moioli	(France) Chloé Trespeuch	(France) Manon Petit-Lenoir	

=== Parallel ===
Date	Place	Event	Winner	Second	Third	Ref.
14 December 2017	(Italy) Carezza	PGS	(Czech Republic) Ester Ledecká	(Germany) Ramona Theresia Hofmeister	(Austria) Ina Meschik	
15 December 2017	(Italy) Cortina d'Ampezzo	PGS	(Czech Republic) Ester Ledecká	(Germany) Selina Jörg	(Austria) Claudia Riegler	
16 December 2017	(Italy) Cortina d'Ampezzo (night)	PSL	(Austria) Sabine Schöffmann	(Switzerland) Julie Zogg	(Russia) Natalia Soboleva	
5 January 2018	(Austria) Lackenhof	PGS	(Czech Republic) Ester Ledecká	(Austria) Julia Dujmovits	(Switzerland) Ladina Jenny	
12 January 2018	(Austria) Bad Gastein	PSL	(Germany) Ramona Theresia Hofmeister	(Russia) Yekaterina Tudegesheva	(Netherlands) Michelle Dekker	
20 January 2018	(Slovenia) Rogla	PGS	(Czech Republic) Ester Ledecká	(Austria) Claudia Riegler	(Austria) Julia Dujmovits	
21 January 2018	(Slovenia) Rogla	PGS	(Germany) Ramona Theresia Hofmeister	(Austria) Sabine Schöffmann	(Russia) Alena Zavarzina	
26 January 2018	(Bulgaria) Bansko	PGS	(Czech Republic) Ester Ledecká	(Germany) Selina Jörg	(Germany) Ramona Theresia Hofmeister	
28 January 2018	(Bulgaria) Bansko	PGS	(Austria) Julia Dujmovits	(Germany) Ramona Theresia Hofmeister	(Germany) Selina Jörg	
3 March 2018	(Turkey) Kayseri	PGS	(Russia) Milena Bykova	(Czech Republic) Ester Ledecká	(Austria) Daniela Ulbing	
10 March 2018	(Switzerland) Scuol	PGS	(Czech Republic) Ester Ledecká	(Russia) Alena Zavarzina	(Switzerland) Ladina Jenny	
17 March 2018	(Germany) Winterberg	PSL	(Germany) Selina Jörg	(Russia) Alena Zavarzina	(Switzerland) Julie Zogg	

=== Big Air ===
Date	Place	Event	Winner	Second	Third	Ref.
4 November 2017	(Denmark) Copenhagen	BA	cancelled due to organizational issues			
11 November 2017	(Italy) Milan	BA	(Austria) Anna Gasser	(United Kingdom) Katie Ormerod	(Switzerland) Sina Candrian	
25 November 2017	(China) Beijing	BA	(Austria) Anna Gasser	(Japan) Miyabi Onitsuka	(Finland) Enni Rukajärvi	
2 December 2017	(Germany) Mönchengladbach	BA	(Switzerland) Carla Somaini	(Japan) Miyabi Onitsuka	(New Zealand) Christy Prior	
10 December 2017	(United States) Cooper Mountain	BA	(Japan) Reira Iwabuchi	(United States) Julia Marino	(Norway) Silje Norendal	
24 March 2018	(Canada) Stoneham/Quebec City	BA	(United States) Julia Marino	(Canada) Laurie Blouin	(Belgium) Loranne Smans	

=== Halfpipe ===
Date	Place	Event	Winner	Second	Third	Ref.
8 September 2017	(New Zealand) Cardrona	HP	(United States) Chloe Kim	(United States) Kelly Clark	(United States) Maddie Mastro	
9 December 2017	(United States) Cooper Mountain	HP	(United States) Chloe Kim	(United States) Maddie Mastro	(United States) Kelly Clark	
21 December 2017	(China) Beijing/Secret Garden	HP	(China) Liu Jiayu	(Japan) Sena Tomita	(China) Cai Xuetong	
13 January 2018	(United States) Snowmass	HP	(Spain) Queralt Castellet	(United States) Chloe Kim	(United States) Maddie Mastro	
20 January 2018	(Switzerland) Laax	HP	(China) Liu Jiayu	(China) Cai Xuetong	(Spain) Queralt Castellet	

=== Slopestyle ===
Date	Place	Event	Winner	Second	Third	Ref.
4 September 2017	(New Zealand) Cardrona	SBS	(United States) Jamie Anderson	(Japan) Miyabi Onitsuka	(New Zealand) Zoi Sadowski-Synnott	
12 January 2018	(United States) Snowmass	SBS	(New Zealand) Christy Prior	(Japan) Reira Iwabuchi	(Australia) Tess Coady	
19 January 2018	(Switzerland) Laax	SBS	cancelled due to snow fall, gusty side winds and low visibility			
16 March 2018	(Italy) Seiser Alm	SBS	(Russia) Sofya Fyodorova	(Norway) Silje Norendal	(Czech Republic) Šárka Pančochová	

== Team ==
=== Snowboard cross men ===
Date	Place	Event	Winner	Second	Third	Ref.
16 December 2017	(Austria) Montafon	SBX_{T}	Spain I Regino Hernández; Lucas Eguibar	Austria I Alessandro Hämmerle; Markus Schairer	France I Merlin Surget; Pierre Vaultier	
21 January 2018	(Turkey) Erzurum	SBX_{T}	Italy I Emanuel Perathoner; Omar Visintin	Austria I Alessandro Hämmerle; Markus Schairer	United States II Nate Holland; Alex Deibold	
11 March 2018	(Russia) Moscow	SBX_{T}	Italy I Emanuel Perathoner; Omar Visintin	Austria IV Julian Lüftner; Alessandro Hämmerle	United States VI Senna Leith; Jake Vedder	
18 March 2018	(Switzerland) Veysonnaz	SBX_{T}	Germany I Paul Berg; Konstantin Schad	Spain I Regino Hernández; Lucas Eguibar	Austria VI Hanno Douschan; Alessandro Hämmerle	

=== Snowboard cross ladies ===
Date	Place	Event	Winner	Second	Third	Ref.
16 December 2017	(Austria) Montafon	SBX_{T}	France I Chloé Trespeuch; Nelly Moenne Loccoz	Canada I Meryeta Odine; Zoe Bergermann	Russia I Kristina Paul; Mariya Vasiltsova	
21 January 2018	(Turkey) Erzurum	SBX_{T}	France I Nelly Moenne Loccoz; Chloé Trespeuch	Czech Republic I Vendula Hopjáková; Eva Samková	Canada I Zoe Bergermann; Meryeta Odine	
11 March 2018	(Russia) Moscow	SBX_{T}	France I Nelly Moenne Loccoz; Chloé Trespeuch	Canada III Tess Critchlow; Zoe Bergermann	Switzerland II Lara Casanova; Simona Meiler	
18 March 2018	(Switzerland) Veysonnaz	SBX_{T}	France I Nelly Moenne Loccoz; Chloé Trespeuch	Italy IV Sofia Belingheri; Raffaella Brutto	Canada III Tess Critchlow; Zoe Bergermann	

=== Parallel mixed ===
Date	Place	Event	Winner	Second	Third	Ref.
6 January 2018	(Austria) Lackenhof	PGS_{M}	Austria III Claudia Riegler; Andreas Prommegger	Austria I Sabine Schöffmann; Alexander Payer	Germany I Selina Jörg; Patrick Bussler	
13 January 2018	(Austria) Bad Gastein	PSL_{M}	Austria II Sabine Schöffmann; Alexander Payer	Germany II Ramona Theresia Hofmeister; Stefan Baumeister	Austria I Claudia Riegler; Andreas Prommegger	
18 March 2018	(Germany) Winterberg	PSL_{M}	Italy I Nadya Ochner; Roland Fischnaller	Austria II Claudia Riegler; Andreas Prommegger	Austria III Julia Dujmovits; Sebastian Kislinger	

== Men's standings ==
=== Parallel overall (PSL/PGS) ===
Rank	after all 12 races	Points
1	(Switzerland) Nevin Galmarini	6570
2	(Italy) Roland Fischnaller	5066
3	(Italy) Edwin Coratti	4543.3
4	(Russia) Andrey Sobolev	3966
5	(Austria) Sebastian Kislinger	3900

=== Parallel slalom ===
Rank	after all 3 races	Points
1	(Italy) Roland Fischnaller	2200
2	(Russia) Dmitry Loginov	1800
3	(Austria) Sebastian Kislinger	1380
4	(Italy) Maurizio Bormolini	1340
5	(Italy) Edwin Coratti	1135

=== Parallel giant slalom ===
Rank	after all 9 races	Points
1	(Switzerland) Nevin Galmarini	5530
2	(Italy) Edwin Coratti	3408.3
3	(Austria) Benjamin Karl	2940
4	(Austria) Alexander Payer	2904
5	(Russia) Andrey Sobolev	2876

=== Snowboard Cross ===
Rank	after all 12 races	Points
1	(France) Pierre Vaultier	7460
2	(Austria) Alessandro Hämmerle	6100
3	(Australia) Alex Pullin	5306
4	(Germany) Paul Berg	3755.5
5	(Italy) Omar Visintin	3690

=== Freestyle overall (BA/SBS/HP) ===
Rank	after all 13 races	Points
1	(United States) Chris Corning	3300
2	(Japan) Yūto Totsuka	3000
3	(Japan) Ayumu Hirano	2800
4	(United States) Redmond Gerard	2470
5	(Norway) Marcus Kleveland	2000

=== Big Air ===
Rank	after all 5 races	Points
1	(United States) Chris Corning	1800
2	(Japan) Yūri Ōkubo	1500
3	(Switzerland) Jonas Bösiger	1464
4	(Canada) Max Parrot	1450
5	(Norway) Mons Røisland	1278.2

=== Halfpipe ===
Rank	after all 5 races	Points
1	(Japan) Yūto Totsuka	3000
2	(Japan) Ayumu Hirano	2800
3	(Japan) Raibu Katayama	1940
4	(United States) Shaun White	1600
5	(United States) Taku Hiraoka	1490

=== Slopestyle ===
Rank	after all 3 races	Points
1	(United States) Chris Corning	1500
2	(United States) Redmond Gerard	1450
3	(Norway) Marcus Kleveland	1000
4	(Japan) Hiroaki Kunitake	920
5	(United States) Lyon Farrell	890

== Ladies' standings ==
=== Parallel overall (PSL/PGS) ===
Rank	after all 12 races	Points
1	(Czech Republic) Ester Ledecká	7540
2	(Germany) Selina Jörg	6010
3	(Germany) Ramona Theresia Hofmeister	5390
4	(Austria) Julia Dujmovits	5090
5	(Russia) Ekaterina Tudegesheva	4810

=== Parallel slalom ===
Rank	after all 3 races	Points
1	(Russia) Ekaterina Tudegesheva	1700
2	(Germany) Selina Jörg	1690
3	(Switzerland) Julie Zogg	1500
4	(Austria) Daniela Ulbing	1350
5	(Russia) Natalia Soboleva	1320

=== Parallel giant slalom ===
Rank	after all 9 races	Points
1	(Czech Republic) Ester Ledecká	7250
2	(Germany) Selina Jörg	4320
3	(Austria) Julia Dujmovits	4210
4	(Germany) Ramona Theresia Hofmeister	4110
5	(Russia) Alena Zavarzina	3430

=== Snowboard Cross ===
Rank	after all 12 races	Points
1	(Italy) Michela Moioli	8410
2	(France) Chloé Trespeuch	7190
3	(France) Nelly Moenne Loccoz	6840
4	(France) Charlotte Bankes	6360
5	(Czech Republic) Eva Samková	4160

=== Freestyle overall (BA/SBS/HP) ===
Rank	after all 13 races	Points
1	(Japan) Miyabi Onitsuka	3260
2	(United States) Chloe Kim	2800
3	(China) Liu Jiayu	2640
4	(Russia) Sofya Fyodorova	2530
5	(Japan) Reira Iwabuchi	2500

=== Big Air ===
Rank	after all 5 races	Points
1	(Austria) Anna Gasser	2000
2	(Japan) Miyabi Onitsuka	1960
3	(United States) Julia Marino	1940
4	(Switzerland) Carla Somaini	1620
5	(Netherlands) Cheryl Maas	1480

=== Halfpipe ===
Rank	after all 5 races	Points
1	(United States) Chloe Kim	2800
2	(China) Liu Jiayu	2640
3	(China) Cai Xuetong	2040
4	(Spain) Queralt Castellet	2000
5	(United States) Maddie Mastro	2000

=== Slopestyle ===
Rank	after all 3 races	Points
1	(Russia) Sofya Fyodorova	1720
2	(Japan) Reira Iwabuchi	1300
2	(Japan) Miyabi Onitsuka	1300
4	(Norway) Silje Norendal	1160
5	(New Zealand) Christy Prior	1080

== Podium table by nation ==
Table showing the World Cup podium places (gold–1st place, silver–2nd place, bronze–3rd place) by the countries represented by the athletes.

Rank	Nation	Gold	Silver	Bronze	Total
1	Austria	12	12	13	37
2	Italy	12	10	7	29
3	United States	10	10	11	31
4	Czech Republic	9	3	1	13
5	France	8	10	13	31
6	Germany	6	5	4	15
7	Japan	4	9	2	15
8	Switzerland	4	4	8	16
9	Russia	4	4	4	12
10	Canada	3	6	3	12
11	Australia	3	2	2	7
11	Norway	3	2	2	7
13	Spain	2	1	3	6
14	China	2	1	2	5
15	New Zealand	1	1	3	5
16	Slovenia	1	1	2	4
17	Bulgaria	0	1	0	1
17	Great Britain	0	1	0	1
17	Poland	0	1	0	1
20	Finland	0	0	2	2
21	Belgium	0	0	1	1
21	Netherlands	0	0	1	1
Totals (22 entries)		84	84	84	252
