= Snowboarding at the 2018 Winter Olympics – Women's snowboard cross =

Women's snowboard cross at the XXIII Olympic Winter Games
- Venue: Bogwang Phoenix Park
- Date: 16 February
- Competitors: 24 from 12 nations

Medalists
1st place, gold medalist(s)		Michela Moioli	Italy
2nd place, silver medalist(s)		Julia Pereira de Sousa Mabileau	France
3rd place, bronze medalist(s)		Eva Samková	Czech Republic

The women's snowboard cross competition of the 2018 Winter Olympics was held on 16 February 2018 Bogwang Phoenix Park in Pyeongchang, South Korea. The event was won by Michela Moioli. Julia Pereira de Sousa Mabileau became second, and Eva Samková, the defending champion, third.

In the finals, Lindsey Jacobellis lead from the start, but was passed first by Moioli, and then by Pereira de Sousa Mabileau. Before the final jump, she was fifth, also behind Samková and Chloé Trespeuch, the 2014 bronze medalist. In this jump, Trespeuch fell and crossed the finish line on her back; this allowed Jacobellis to finish fourth, 0.03 seconds behind Samková. Trespeuch, despite her fall, was fifth, and the last finalist, Aleksandra Zhekova, sixth. Jacobellis was consistently rated favorite in this Olympic event since 2006 and only won a medal once, silver in 2006.

In the victory ceremony, the medals were presented by Bernard Rajzman, member of the executive board of the International Olympic Committee, accompanied by Michel Vion, FIS Council Member.

== Qualification ==
The top 24 athletes in the Olympic quota allocation list qualified, with a maximum of four athletes per National Olympic Committee (NOC) allowed. All athletes qualifying must also have placed in the top 30 of a FIS World Cup event or the FIS Freestyle Ski and Snowboarding World Championships 2017 during the qualification period (1 July 2016 to 21 January 2018) and also have a minimum of 100 FIS points to compete. If the host country, did not qualify, their chosen athlete would displace the last qualified athlete, granted all qualification criterion was met.

== Results ==
=== Qualification ===
The qualification run was held at 10:00.

Rank	Bib	Name	Country	Run 1	Run 2	Best	Notes
1	16	Eva Samková	Czech Republic	1:16.84	—	1:16.84	Q
2	2	Michela Moioli	Italy	1:16.97	—	1:16.97	Q
3	6	Faye Gulini	United States	1:17.74	—	1:17.74	Q
4	13	Lindsey Jacobellis	United States	1:18.05	—	1:18.05	Q
5	8	Charlotte Bankes	France	1:18.18	—	1:18.18	Q
6	4	Chloé Trespeuch	France	1:18.51	—	1:18.51	Q
7	18	Simona Meiler	Switzerland	1:18.95	—	1:18.95	Q
8	7	Nelly Moenne-Loccoz	France	1:20.23	—	1:20.23	Q
9	5	Aleksandra Zhekova	Bulgaria	1:20.23	—	1:20.23	Q
10	10	Belle Brockhoff	Australia	1:20.34	—	1:20.34	Q
11	24	Meghan Tierney	United States	1:20.52	—	1:20.52	Q
12	17	Mariya Vasiltsova	Olympic Athletes from Russia	1:20.57	—	1:20.57	Q
13	1	Zoe Bergermann	Canada	1:21.57	1:18.65	1:18.65	Q
14	19	Kristina Paul	Olympic Athletes from Russia	1:21.93	1:19.93	1:19.93	Q
15	12	Julia Pereira de Sousa Mabileau	France	1:21.72	1:20.17	1:20.17	Q
16	21	Alexandra Hasler	Switzerland	1:20.87	1:20.49	1:20.49	Q
17	20	Zoe Gillings-Brier	Great Britain	1:20.99	1:20.84	1:20.84	Q
18	11	Carle Brenneman	Canada	1:21.57	1:20.89	1:20.89	Q
19	9	Raffaella Brutto	Italy	DNF	1:21.14	1:21.14	Q
20	14	Tess Critchlow	Canada	1:21.39	1:21.83	1:21.39	Q
21	15	Lara Casanova	Switzerland	1:22.26	DNS	1:22.26	Q
22	22	Jana Fischer	Germany	1:22.92	DNF	1:22.92	Q
23	25	Zuzanna Smykała	Poland	1:23.41	1:23.44	1:23.41	Q
24	26	Vendula Hopjáková	Czech Republic	DNF	DNF	DNF	Q
	3	Meryeta O'Dine	Canada	DNS	DNS	DNS	
	23	Isabel Clark Ribeiro	Brazil	DNS	DNS	DNS	*

- She suffered an accident and was injured in a training session on February 15.

=== Elimination round ===
In the quarterfinals the first three ranked competitors in each heat proceed to the next phase. In the semifinals the first three ranked competitors of each heat proceed to the Big Final. The 4th to 6th ranked competitors of each heat proceed to the Small Final.

==== Quarterfinals ====
Heat 1

Rank	Bib	Name	Country	Notes
1	9	Aleksandra Zhekova	Bulgaria	Q
2	1	Eva Samková	Czech Republic	Q
3	8	Nelly Moenne-Loccoz	France	Q
4	17	Zoe Gillings-Brier	Great Britain	
5	16	Alexandra Hasler	Switzerland	
	24	Vendula Hopjáková	Czech Republic	DNS

Heat 2

Rank	Bib	Name	Country	Notes
1	4	Lindsey Jacobellis	United States	Q
2	20	Tess Critchlow	Canada	Q
3	5	Charlotte Bankes	France	Q
4	21	Lara Casanova	Switzerland	
	12	Mariya Vasiltsova	Olympic Athletes from Russia	DNF
	13	Zoe Bergermann	Canada	DNF

Heat 3

Rank	Bib	Name	Country	Notes
1	6	Chloé Trespeuch	France	Q
2	14	Kristina Paul	Olympic Athletes from Russia	Q
3	19	Raffaella Brutto	Italy	Q
4	22	Jana Fischer	Germany	
5	11	Meghan Tierney	United States	
6	3	Faye Gulini	United States	

Heat 4

Rank	Bib	Name	Country	Notes
1	2	Michela Moioli	Italy	Q
2	15	Julia Pereira de Sousa Mabileau	France	Q
3	10	Belle Brockhoff	Australia	Q
4	18	Carle Brenneman	Canada	
5	23	Zuzanna Smykała	Poland	
6	7	Simona Meiler	Switzerland	

==== Semifinals ====
Heat 1

Rank	Bib	Name	Country	Notes
1	1	Eva Samková	Czech Republic	Q
2	4	Lindsey Jacobellis	United States	Q
3	9	Aleksandra Zhekova	Bulgaria	Q
4	20	Tess Critchlow	Canada	
5	8	Nelly Moenne-Loccoz	France	
	5	Charlotte Bankes	France	DNF

Heat 2

Rank	Bib	Name	Country	Notes
1	2	Michela Moioli	Italy	Q
2	6	Chloé Trespeuch	France	Q
3	15	Julia Pereira de Sousa Mabileau	France	Q
	14	Kristina Paul	Olympic Athletes from Russia	DNF
	10	Belle Brockhoff	Australia	DNF
	19	Raffaella Brutto	Italy	DNF

==== Finals ====
Small Final

Rank	Bib	Name	Country	Notes
7	5	Charlotte Bankes	France	
8	19	Raffaella Brutto	Italy	
9	20	Tess Critchlow	Canada	
10	8	Nelly Moenne-Loccoz	France	
11	10	Belle Brockhoff	Australia	
12	14	Kristina Paul	Olympic Athletes from Russia	DNF

Large Final

Rank	Bib	Name	Country	Notes
1st place, gold medalist(s)	2	Michela Moioli	Italy	
2nd place, silver medalist(s)	15	Julia Pereira de Sousa Mabileau	France	
3rd place, bronze medalist(s)	1	Eva Samková	Czech Republic	
4	4	Lindsey Jacobellis	United States	
5	6	Chloé Trespeuch	France	
6	9	Aleksandra Zhekova	Bulgaria	
