= FIS Freestyle Ski and Snowboarding World Championships 2017 – Women's snowboard cross =

The women's snowboard cross competition of the FIS Freestyle Ski and Snowboarding World Championships 2017 was held at Sierra Nevada, Spain on March 10 (qualifying) and March 12 (finals). 28 athletes from 12 countries competed.

== Qualification ==
The following are the results of the qualification.

| Rank | Bib | Name | Country | Run 1 | Rank | Run 2 | Rank | Best | Diff | Notes |
|---|---|---|---|---|---|---|---|---|---|---|
| 1 | 8 | Eva Samkova | Czech Republic | 1:14.61 | 1 | | | 1:14.61 | | Q |
| 2 | 13 | Lindsey Jacobellis | United States | 1:14.86 | 2 | | | 1:14.86 | +0.25 | Q |
| 3 | 9 | Michela Moioli | Italy | 1:15.25 | 3 | | | 1:15.25 | +0.64 | Q |
| 4 | 14 | Faye Gulini | United States | 1:15.25 | 3 | | | 1:15.25 | +0.64 | Q |
| 5 | 3 | Nelly Moenne Loccoz | France | 1:16.56 | 5 | | | 1:16.56 | +1.95 | Q |
| 6 | 1 | Zoe Bergermann | Canada | 1:16.96 | 6 | | | 1:16.96 | +2.35 | Q |
| 7 | 6 | Carle Brenneman | Canada | 1:17.46 | 7 | | | 1:17.46 | +2.85 | Q |
| 8 | 10 | Charlotte Bankes | France | 1:17.86 | 8 | | | 1:17.86 | +3.25 | Q |
| 9 | 4 | Mariya Vasiltsova | Russia | 1:17.91 | 9 | | | 1:17.91 | +3.30 | Q |
| 10 | 15 | Tess Critchlow | Canada | 1:18.36 | 10 | | | 1:18.36 | +3.75 | Q |
| 11 | 17 | Zoe Gillings-Brier | Great Britain | 1:19.55 | 11 | | | 1:19.55 | +4.94 | Q |
| 12 | 19 | Manon Petit | France | 1:20.50 | 12 | | | 1:20.50 | +5.89 | Q |
| 13 | 7 | Chloe Trespeuch | France | DNF | | 1:15.03 | 1 | 1:15.03 | +0.42 | q |
| 14 | 12 | Raffaella Brutto | Italy | DNF | | 1:18.16 | 2 | 1:18.16 | +3.55 | q |
| 15 | 23 | Yulia Lapteva | Russia | DNF | | 1:20.01 | 3 | 1:20.01 | +5.40 | q |
| 16 | 5 | Alexandra Jekova | Bulgaria | DNF | | 1:20.87 | 4 | 1:20.87 | +6.26 | q |
| 17 | 24 | Vendula Hopjakova | Czech Republic | 1:24.27 | 13 | 1:24.69 | 5 | 1:24.27 | +9.66 | q |
| 18 | 27 | Maisie Potter | Great Britain | DSQ | | 1:25.46 | 6 | 1:25.46 | +10.85 | q |
| 19 | 20 | Sofia Belingheri | Italy | 1:31.09 | 18 | 1:26.69 | 7 | 1:26.69 | +12.08 | q |
| 20 | 22 | Zuzanna Smykala | Poland | 1:26.79 | 14 | 1:33.86 | 12 | 1:26.79 | +12.18 | q |
| 21 | 16 | Rosina Mancari | United States | DNF | | 1:27.82 | 8 | 1:27.82 | +13.21 | q |
| 22 | 28 | Sara Veselkova | Czech Republic | 1:29.44 | 15 | 1:30.04 | 10 | 1:29.44 | +14.83 | q |
| 23 | 26 | Katerina Louthanova | Czech Republic | 1:29.80 | 16 | 1:49.12 | 13 | 1:29.80 | +15.19 | q |
| 24 | 18 | Isabel Clark Ribeiro | Brazil | 1:30.59 | 17 | 1:29.99 | 9 | 1:29.99 | +15.38 | q |
| 25 | 17 | Hanna Ihedioha | Germany | DNF | | 1:31.30 | 11 | 1:31.10 | +16.49 | |
| | 2 | Meryeta Odine | Canada | DNF | | DNS | | | | |
| | 11 | Belle Brockhoff | Australia | DNS | | DNS | | | | |
| | 21 | Francesca Gallina | Italy | DNS | | DNS | | | | |

== Elimination round ==
The following are the results of the elimination round.

=== Quarterfinals ===
Heat 1

| Rank | Bib | Name | Country | Notes |
|---|---|---|---|---|
| 1 | 1 | Eva Samkova | Czech Republic | Q |
| 2 | 16 | Alexandra Jekova | Bulgaria | Q |
| 3 | 17 | Vendula Hopjakova | Czech Republic | Q |
| 4 | 24 | Isabel Clark Ribeiro | Brazil | |
| 5 | 9 | Mariya Vasiltsova | Russia | |
| DNF | 8 | Charlotte Bankes | France | |

Heat 2

| Rank | Bib | Name | Country | Notes |
|---|---|---|---|---|
| 1 | 13 | Chloe Trespeuch | France | Q |
| 2 | 5 | Nelly Moenne Loccoz | France | Q |
| 3 | 12 | Manon Petit | France | Q |
| 4 | 4 | Faye Gulini | United States | |
| 5 | 21 | Rosina Mancari | United States | |
| 6 | 20 | Zuzanna Smykala | Poland | |

Heat 3

| Rank | Bib | Name | Country | Notes |
|---|---|---|---|---|
| 1 | 3 | Michela Moioli | Italy | Q |
| 2 | 14 | Raffaella Brutto | Italy | Q |
| 3 | 11 | Zoe Gillings-Brier | Great Britain | Q |
| 4 | 19 | Sofia Belingheri | Italy | |
| 5 | 22 | Sara Veselkova | Czech Republic | |
| DNS | 6 | Zoe Bergermann | Canada | |

Heat 4

| Rank | Bib | Name | Country | Notes |
|---|---|---|---|---|
| 1 | 2 | Lindsey Jacobellis | United States | Q |
| 2 | 7 | Carle Brenneman | Canada | Q |
| 3 | 15 | Yulia Lapteva | Russia | Q |
| 4 | 18 | Maisie Potter | Great Britain | |
| 5 | 23 | Katerina Louthanova | Czech Republic | |
| DNS | 10 | Tess Critchlow | Canada | |

=== Semifinals ===
Heat 1

| Rank | Bib | Name | Country | Notes |
|---|---|---|---|---|
| 1 | 13 | Chloe Trespeuch | France | Q |
| 2 | 12 | Manon Petit | France | Q |
| 3 | 16 | Alexandra Jekova | Bulgaria | Q |
| 4 | 17 | Vendula Hopjakova | Czech Republic | |
| 5 | 5 | Nelly Moenne Loccoz | France | |
| DSQ | 1 | Eva Samkova | Czech Republic | |

Heat 2

| Rank | Bib | Name | Country | Notes |
|---|---|---|---|---|
| 1 | 2 | Lindsey Jacobellis | United States | Q |
| 2 | 14 | Raffaella Brutto | Italy | Q |
| 3 | 3 | Michela Moioli | Italy | Q |
| 4 | 7 | Carle Brenneman | Canada | |
| 5 | 11 | Zoe Gillings-Brier | Great Britain | |
| DSQ | 15 | Yulia Lapteva | Russia | |

=== Finals ===
==== Small Finals ====
| Rank | Bib | Name | Country | Notes |
|---|---|---|---|---|
| 7 | 5 | Nelly Moenne Loccoz | France | |
| 8 | 7 | Carle Brenneman | Canada | |
| 9 | 11 | Zoe Gillings-Brier | Great Britain | |
| 10 | 15 | Yulia Lapteva | Russia | |
| 11 | 17 | Vendula Hopjakova | Czech Republic | |
| 12 | 1 | Eva Samkova | Czech Republic | |

==== Big Finals ====
| Rank | Bib | Name | Country | Notes |
|---|---|---|---|---|
| 1st place, gold medalist(s) | 2 | Lindsey Jacobellis | United States | |
| 2nd place, silver medalist(s) | 13 | Chloe Trespeuch | France | |
| 3rd place, bronze medalist(s) | 3 | Michela Moioli | Italy | |
| 4 | 16 | Alexandra Jekova | Bulgaria | |
| 5 | 12 | Manon Petit | France | |
| 6 | 14 | Raffaella Brutto | Italy | |
