= FIS Freestyle Ski and Snowboarding World Championships 2015 – Women's snowboard slopestyle =

The women's snowboard slopestyle competition of the FIS Freestyle Ski and Snowboarding World Championships 2015 was held at Kreischberg, Austria on January 19 (qualifying) and January 21 (finals). 35 athletes from 19 countries competed.

== Qualification ==
The following are the results of the qualification.

Rank	Heat	Bib	Name	Country	Run 1	Run 2	Best	Notes
1	1	3	Sina Candrian	Switzerland	75.00	94.33	94.33	QF
2	1	2	Anna Gasser	Austria	84.33	68.33	84.33	QF
3	1	1	Anna Gyarmati	Hungary	55.66	70.00	70.00	QS
4	1	12	Karly Shorr	United States	69.66	50.33	69.66	QS
5	1	8	Jessika Jenson	United States	50.00	63.66	63.66	QS
6	1	4	Silvia Mittermüller	Germany	16.66	55.66	55.66	
7	1	13	Loranne Smans	Belgium	20.00	46.00	46.00	
8	1	6	Julia Marino	United States	43.33	15.00	43.33	
9	1	5	Ty Walker	United States	33.33	41.33	41.33	
10	1	9	María Hidalgo	Spain	24.33	7.00	24.33	
11	1	18	Michaela Davis-Meehan	Australia	22.33	24.00	24.00	
12	1	11	Marion Haerty	France	6.66	23.66	23.66	
13	1	10	Chloe Sillieres	France	21.66	11.00	21.66	
14	1	14	Anastasia Zhukova	Russia	11.66	DNS	11.66	
15	1	17	Antonia Yanez	Chile	3.66	5.66	5.66	
	1	7	Šárka Pančochová	Czech Republic			DNS	
	1	15	Elena Kostenko	Russia			DNS	
	1	16	Urška Pribošič	Slovenia			DNS	
1	2	29	Jenna Blasman	Canada	58.66	87.33	87.33	QF
2	2	27	Miyabi Onitsuka	Japan	79.33	62.66	79.33	QF
3	2	22	Aimee Fuller	Great Britain	74.00	70.66	74.00	QS
4	2	36	Ella Suitiala	Finland	24.33	72.00	72.00	QS
5	2	28	Klaudia Medlova	Slovakia	69.66	61.33	69.66	QS
6	2	26	Kristiina Nisula	Finland	54.66	66.66	66.66	
7	2	21	Samm Denena	Canada	64.00	26.66	64.00	
8	2	24	Brooke Vogt	Canada	38.00	61.33	61.33	
9	2	34	Natsuki Sato	Japan	47.00	11.66	47.00	
10	2	30	Audrey McManiman	Canada	32.33	46.00	46.00	
11	2	25	Elena Könz	Switzerland	4.33	45.33	45.33	
12	2	23	Henna Ikola	Finland	35.00	11.00	35.00	
13	2	31	Lia-Mara Bösch	Switzerland	22.33	26.33	26.33	
14	2	32	Kateřina Vojáčková	Czech Republic	13.00	10.66	13.00	
15	2	37	Wesley Ann Huntington	Brazil	1.66	3.66	3.66	
16	2	35	Cilka Sadar	Slovenia	3.00	DNS	3.00	
	2	33	Merika Enne	Finland			DNS	

== Semifinal ==
The following are the results of the semifinal.

Rank	Bib	Name	Country	Run 1	Run 2	Best	Notes
1	28	Klaudia Medlova	Slovakia	81.75	DNS	81.75	Q
2	1	Anna Gyarmati	Hungary	40.75	71.50	71.50	Q
3	22	Aimee Fuller	Great Britain	69.50	56.00	69.50	
4	36	Ella Suitiala	Finland	28.00	34.50	34.50	
5	12	Karly Shorr	United States	21.00	18.00	21.00	
6	8	Jessika Jenson	United States	14.00	12.25	14.00	

== Final ==
The following are the results of the finals.

Rank	Bib	Name	Country	Run 1	Run 2	Run 3	Best
1st place, gold medalist(s)	27	Miyabi Onitsuka	Japan	54.75	92.50	44.25	92.50
2nd place, silver medalist(s)	2	Anna Gasser	Austria	75.25	25.00	89.50	89.50
3rd place, bronze medalist(s)	28	Klaudia Medlova	Slovakia	84.25	40.75	39.75	84.25
4	3	Sina Candrian	Switzerland	72.25	79.50	43.50	79.50
5	29	Jenna Blasman	Canada	38.25	61.25	21.50	61.25
6	1	Anna Gyarmati	Hungary	DNS	DNS	DNS	DNS
