= FIS Freestyle Ski and Snowboarding World Championships 2017 – Women's big air =

The women's snowboard big air competition of the FIS Freestyle Ski and Snowboarding World Championships 2017 was held at Sierra Nevada, Spain on March 16 (qualifying) and March 17 (finals). 37 athletes from 21 countries competed.

== Qualification ==
The following are the results of the qualification.

=== Heat 1 ===
Rank	Bib	Name	Country	Run 1	Run 2	Best	Notes
1	1	Anna Gasser	Austria	82.00	90.00	90.00	Q
2	13	Silje Norendal	Norway	84.33	76.66	84.33	Q
3	9	Jessika Jenson	United States	74.33	81.66	81.66	SF
4	35	Antonia Yañez	Chile	34.00	80.33	80.33	SF
5	17	Queralt Castellet	Spain	78.66	13.33	78.66	SF
6	22	Sofya Fedorova	Russia	78.00	14.33	78.00	
7	16	Aimee Fuller	Great Britain	63.33	69.33	69.33	
8	20	Lucile Lefevre	France	65.33	38.00	65.33	
9	34	Tess Coady	Australia	61.33	65.00	65.00	
10	26	María Hidalgo	Spain	59.66	59.66	59.66	
11	5	Klaudia Medlová	Slovakia	57.33	18.00	57.33	
12	30	Babs Barnhoorn	Netherlands	56.66	52.66	56.66	
13	4	Karly Shorr	United States	37.66	56.00	56.00	
14	54	Kateřina Vojáčková	Czech Republic	47.00	55.33	55.33	
15	12	Brooke Voigt	Canada	50.00	31.66	50.00	
16	8	Yuka Fujimori	Japan	35.00	37.33	37.33	
17	31	Urška Pribošič	Slovenia	27.33	30.33	30.33	
18	39	Emmi Parkkisenniemi	Finland	23.33	18.00	23.33	
19	40	Sandra Isabel Hillen Rodriguez	Mexico	18.66	5.00	18.66	

=== Heat 2 ===
Rank	Bib	Name	Country	Run 1	Run 2	Best	Notes
1	11	Laurie Blouin	Canada	20.00	91.66	91.66	Q
2	2	Enni Rukajärvi	Finland	84.66	26.66	84.66	Q
3	24	Kjersti Buaas	Norway	83.66	9.66	83.66	SF
4	3	Cheryl Maas	Netherlands	82.33	81.66	82.33	SF
5	10	Zoi Sadowski-Synnott	New Zealand	80.33	82.00	82.00	SF
6	6	Silvia Mittermüller	Germany	80.00	15.33	80.00	
7	37	Ty Walker	United States	18.66	79.00	79.00	
8	7	Miyabi Onitsuka	Japan	76.66	60.00	76.66	
9	19	Carla Somaini	Switzerland	17.00	76.33	76.33	
10	15	Isabel Derungs	Switzerland	74.33	64.66	74.33	
11	14	Šárka Pančochová	Czech Republic	14.66	69.66	69.66	
12	32	Nadja Flemming	Germany	55.66	67.00	67.00	
13	18	Elena Könz	Switzerland	63.33	21.33	63.33	
14	36	Lea Jugovac	Croatia	50.00	33.00	50.00	
15	33	Natalie Good	New Zealand	12.00	44.66	44.66	
16	27	Asami Hirono	Japan	21.00	20.00	21.00	
17	23	Kirra Kotsenburg	United States	15.00	DNS	15.00	
	28	Anastasia Zhukova	Russia	DNS	DNS	DNS	

== Semi-final ==
The following are the results of the semi-final.

Rank	Bib	Name	Country	Run 1	Run 2	Best	Notes
1	9	Jessika Jenson	United States	82.00	24.75	82.00	Q
2	10	Zoi Sadowski-Synnott	New Zealand	23.00	69.00	69.00	Q
3	3	Cheryl Maas	Netherlands	29.75	55.25	55.25	
4	35	Antonia Yañez	Chile	32.50	29.50	32.50	
5	24	Kjersti Buaas	Norway	22.50	28.50	28.50	
6	17	Queralt Castellet	Spain	19.00	16.25	19.00	

== Final ==
The following are the results of the finals.

Rank	Bib	Name	Country	Run 1	Run 2	Run 3	2 Best
1st place, gold medalist(s)	1	Anna Gasser	Austria	89.50	JNS	100.00	189.50
2nd place, silver medalist(s)	2	Enni Rukajärvi	Finland	79.50	85.75	JNS	165.25
3rd place, bronze medalist(s)	13	Silje Norendal	Norway	85.25	77.50	JNS	162.75
4	10	Zoi Sadowski-Synnott	New Zealand	75.00	JNS	75.25	150.25
5	9	Jessika Jenson	United States	65.00	78.00	JNS	143.00
6	11	Laurie Blouin	Canada	JNS	92.00	28.00	120.00
