= FIS Freestyle Ski and Snowboarding World Championships 2021 – Mixed snowboard team cross =

Mixed snowboard team cross at the FIS Freestyle Ski and Snowboarding World Championships 2021
- Location: Idre, Sweden
- Date: 12 February
- Competitors: 30 from 9 nations
- Teams: 15

Medalists
gold medal	Jarryd Hughes; Belle Brockhoff	Australia
silver medal	Lorenzo Sommariva; Michela Moioli	Italy
bronze medal	Léo Le Blé Jaques; Julia Pereira de Sousa Mabileau	France

The Mixed snowboard team cross competition at the FIS Freestyle Ski and Snowboarding World Championships 2021 was held on 12 February 2021.

== Elimination round ==
Four-team elimination races were held, with the top two from each race advancing.

=== Quarterfinals ===
Heat 1

Rank	Bib	Country	Athletes	Notes
1	1	Italy 1	Lorenzo Sommariva; Michela Moioli	Q
2	8	France 2	Léo Le Blé Jaques; Julia Pereira de Sousa Mabileau	Q
3	9	United States 2	Alex Deibold; Stacy Gaskill	
4	16	Russian Ski Federation 2	Andrey Anisimov; Yulia Lapteva	

Heat 3

Rank	Bib	Country	Athletes	Notes
1	14	Czech Republic 1	Jan Kubičík; Eva Samková	Q
2	3	Austria 1	Jakob Dusek; Pia Zerkhold	Q
3	6	France 1	Merlin Surget; Chloé Trespeuch	
	11	Germany 1	Martin Nörl; Jana Fischer	DNS

Heat 2

Rank	Bib	Country	Athletes	Notes
1	4	Italy 2	Omar Visintin; Raffaella Brutto	Q
2	13	Canada 2	Liam Moffatt; Zoe Bergermann	Q
3	12	Switzerland 2	Nick Watter; Aline Albrecht	
4	5	Canada 1	Éliot Grondin; Meryeta O'Dine	

Heat 4

Rank	Bib	Country	Athletes	Notes
1	2	United States 1	Hagen Kearney; Faye Gulini	Q
2	7	Australia 1	Jarryd Hughes; Belle Brockhoff	Q
3	10	Switzerland 1	Kalle Koblet; Lara Casanova	
4	15	Russian Ski Federation 1	Daniil Dilman; Kristina Paul	

=== Semifinals ===
Heat 1

Rank	Bib	Country	Athletes	Notes
1	1	Italy 1	Lorenzo Sommariva; Michela Moioli	Q
2	8	France 2	Léo Le Blé Jaques; Julia Pereira de Sousa Mabileau	Q
3	4	Italy 2	Omar Visintin; Raffaella Brutto	
4	13	Canada 2	Liam Moffatt; Zoe Bergermann	

Heat 2

Rank	Bib	Country	Athletes	Notes
1	7	Australia 1	Jarryd Hughes; Belle Brockhoff	Q
2	2	United States 1	Hagen Kearney; Faye Gulini	Q
3	14	Czech Republic 1	Jan Kubičík; Eva Samková	
4	3	Austria 1	Jakob Dusek; Pia Zerkhold	

=== Finals ===
==== Small final ====
Rank	Bib	Country	Athletes	Notes
5	14	Czech Republic 1	Jan Kubičík; Eva Samková	
6	4	Italy 2	Omar Visintin; Raffaella Brutto	
7	3	Austria 1	Jakob Dusek; Pia Zerkhold	DNF
8	13	Canada 2	Liam Moffatt; Zoe Bergermann	DNF

==== Big final ====
Rank	Bib	Country	Athletes	Notes
1st place, gold medalist(s)	7	Australia 1	Jarryd Hughes; Belle Brockhoff	
2nd place, silver medalist(s)	1	Italy 1	Lorenzo Sommariva; Michela Moioli	
3rd place, bronze medalist(s)	8	France 2	Léo Le Blé Jaques; Julia Pereira de Sousa Mabileau	
4	2	United States 1	Hagen Kearney; Faye Gulini	
