= Snowboarding at the 2013 Winter Universiade – Women's snowboard cross =

The women's snowboard cross competition of the 2013 Winter Universiade was held at Monte Bondone, Italy between December 11–12, 2013.

The qualification round was completed on December 11, while the elimination round was completed on December 12.

== Medalists ==
Gold	Eva Samková; Czech Republic
Silver	Kateřina Chourová; Czech Republic
Bronze	Zuzanna Smykała; Poland

== Results ==
=== Qualification ===
Rank	Bib	Name	Country	Run 1	Rank	Run 2	Rank	Best	Notes
1	19	Eva Samková	Czech Republic	45.72	1	DNS		45.72	Q
2	29	Kateřina Chourová	Czech Republic	48.18	2	48.42	2	48.18	Q
3	28	Zuzanna Smykała	Poland	48.88	3	48.30	1	48.30	Q
4	23	Karen Iwadare	Japan	49.27	4	48.72	3	48.72	Q
5	17	Irina Kovaleva	Russia	49.64	7	48.74	4	48.74	Q
6	24	Mariya Vasiltsova	Russia	49.46	6	48.80	5	48.80	Q
7	22	Laura Berger	Switzerland	49.91	8	49.61	6	49.61	Q
8	31	Anastasia Asanova	Russia	49.62	6	49.75	7	49.62	Q
9	27	Amanda Taylor	Australia	51.95	11	50.75	8	50.75	Q
10	20	Danielle Hildebrand	Canada	52.57	13	51.28	9	51.28	Q
11	18	Giulia Manfrini	Italy	54.77	16	51.49	10	51.49	Q
12	26	Hannah Orchard	New Zealand	51.66	9	51.78	12	51.66	Q
13	33	Greta Felder	Italy	52.22	12	51.72	11	51.72	Q
14	25	Frederique Joncas	Canada	51.80	10	51.78	12	51.78	Q
15	21	Giorgia Rescigno	Great Britain	53.54	14	52.13	14	52.13	Q
16	66	Claire Gentile	United States	54.63	15	52.88	15	52.88	Q
17	65	Lauren Angel	United States	56.29	18	54.08	16	54.08	
18	68	Cassie Davis	United States	55.47	17	57.91	18	55.47	
19	67	Lexi Sinor	United States	57.94	19	56.79	17	56.79	
20	30	Jennifer Osborne	Great Britain	1:05.45	20	1:01.23	19	1:01.23	
	32	Maria Ramberger	Austria	DNS		DNS		DNS	

== Elimination round ==
=== Quarterfinals ===
The top 24 qualifiers advanced to the Quarterfinals. From here, they participated in six-person elimination races, with the top three from each race advancing.

Heat 1

Rank	Bib	Name	Country	Notes
1	1	Eva Samková	Czech Republic	
2	8	Anastasia Asanova	Russia	
3	9	Amanda Taylor	Australia	
4	16	Claire Gentile	United States	

Heat 2

Rank	Bib	Name	Country	Notes
1	4	Karen Iwadare	Japan	
2	12	Hannah Orchard	New Zealand	
3	5	Irina Kovaleva	Russia	
4	13	Greta Felder	Italy	

Heat 3

Rank	Bib	Name	Country	Notes
1	3	Zuzanna Smykała	Poland	
2	11	Giulia Manfrini	Italy	
3	6	Mariya Vasiltsova	Russia	
4	14	Frederique Joncas	Canada	

Heat 4

Rank	Bib	Name	Country	Notes
1	2	Kateřina Chourová	Czech Republic	
2	10	Danielle Hildebrand	Canada	
3	15	Giorgia Rescigno	Great Britain	
4	7	Laura Berger	Switzerland	

=== Semifinals ===
Heat 1

Rank	Bib	Name	Country	Notes
1	1	Eva Samková	Czech Republic	
2	8	Anastasia Asanova	Russia	
3	12	Hannah Orchard	New Zealand	
4	4	Karen Iwadare	Japan	

Heat 2

Rank	Bib	Name	Country	Notes
1	3	Zuzanna Smykała	Poland	
2	2	Kateřina Chourová	Czech Republic	
3	11	Giulia Manfrini	Italy	
4	10	Danielle Hildebrand	Canada	

=== Finals ===
==== Small Finals ====
Rank	Bib	Name	Country	Notes
5	4	Karen Iwadare	Japan	
6	11	Giulia Manfrini	Italy	
7	12	Hannah Orchard	New Zealand	
8	10	Danielle Hildebrand	Canada	

==== Big Finals ====
Rank	Bib	Name	Country	Notes
1st place, gold medalist(s)	1	Eva Samková	Czech Republic	
2nd place, silver medalist(s)	2	Kateřina Chourová	Czech Republic	
3rd place, bronze medalist(s)	3	Zuzanna Smykała	Poland	
4	8	Anastasia Asanova	Russia	
