= Snowboarding at the 2022 Winter Olympics – Women's snowboard cross =

Women's snowboard cross at the XXIV Olympic Winter Games
- Snowboarding
- Venue: Genting Snow Park, Zhangjiakou
- Date: 9 February 2022
- Competitors: 31 from 13 nations

Medalists
1st place, gold medalist(s)		Lindsey Jacobellis	United States
2nd place, silver medalist(s)		Chloé Trespeuch	France
3rd place, bronze medalist(s)		Meryeta O'Dine	Canada

The women's snowboard cross competition in snowboarding at the 2022 Winter Olympics was held on 9 February, at the Genting Snow Park in Zhangjiakou. Lindsey Jacobellis of the United States became the Olympic champion. Jacobellis dominated the snowboard cross for almost two decades, winning the X Games ten times and the world championships six times, but her only Olympic medal so far was the silver in 2006, when she started celebrating her win too early and was overtaken at the finish line. Chloé Trespeuch of France, the 2014 bronze medalist, won the silver medal, and Meryeta O'Dine of Canada the bronze, her first Olympic medal.

In the victory ceremony, the medals were presented by Pál Schmitt, IOC Member, Hungary, Olympian, 2 Golds for Fencing 1968 and Fencing 1972, accompanied by Johan Eliasch, FIS President, Great Britain.

The defending champion was Michela Moioli. The 2018 silver medalist, Julia Pereira de Sousa Mabileau, qualified for the Olympics as well. The bronze medalist and the 2014 champion, Eva Samková, was injured and could not participate. At the 2021–22 FIS Snowboard World Cup, six snowboard cross events were held before the Olympics. Charlotte Bankes was leading the ranking, followed by Trespeuch and Moioli. Bankes was the 2021 world champion, with Moioli and Samková being the silver and bronze medalists, respectively.

== Qualification ==
A total of 32 snowboarders qualified to compete at the games. For an athlete to compete they must have a minimum of 100.00 FIS points on the FIS Points List on 17 January 2022 and a top 30 finish in a World Cup event or at the FIS Snowboard World Championships 2021. A country could enter a maximum of four athletes into the event.

== Results ==
=== Seeding run ===
The seeding run was held at 11:00.

Rank	Bib	Name	Country	Run 1	Run 2	Best
1	4	Michela Moioli	Italy	1:22.19	–	1:22.19
2	3	Charlotte Bankes	Great Britain	1:22.72	–	1:22.72
3	14	Meryeta O'Dine	Canada	1:23.01	–	1:23.01
4	1	Stacy Gaskill	United States	1:23.14	–	1:23.14
5	6	Lindsey Jacobellis	United States	1:23.44	–	1:23.44
6	10	Julia Pereira de Sousa Mabileau	France	1:23.89	–	1:23.89
7	5	Faye Gulini	United States	1:23.98	–	1:23.98
8	7	Chloé Trespeuch	France	1:24.27	–	1:24.27
9	8	Pia Zerkhold	Austria	1:24.53	–	1:24.53
10	16	Kristina Paul	ROC	1:24.76	–	1:24.76
11	25	Caterina Carpano	Italy	1:24.87	–	1:24.87
12	15	Manon Petit-Lenoir	France	1:24.96	–	1:24.96
13	12	Audrey McManiman	Canada	1:24.98	–	1:24.98
14	20	Josie Baff	Australia	1:25.11	–	1:25.11
15	22	Sophie Hediger	Switzerland	1:25.14	–	1:25.14
16	23	Meghan Tierney	United States	1:25.16	–	1:25.16
17	17	Lara Casanova	Switzerland	1:26.89	1:24.12	1:24.12
18	2	Belle Brockhoff	Australia	1:25.72	1:24.72	1:24.72
19	29	Aleksandra Parshina	ROC	1:27.16	1:24.76	1:24.76
20	26	Jana Fischer	Germany	1:25.76	1:24.88	1:24.88
21	19	Alexia Queyrel	France	1:25.25	1:25.17	1:25.17
22	21	Francesca Gallina	Italy	1:25.27	1:25.51	1:25.27
23	27	Vendula Hopjáková	Czech Republic	1:26.26	1:25.49	1:25.49
24	13	Zoe Bergermann	Canada	1:28.68	1:25.84	1:25.84
25	24	Mariya Vasiltsova	ROC	1:26.39	1:25.90	1:25.90
26	9	Tess Critchlow	Canada	1:26.51	1:26.13	1:26.13
27	28	Ekaterina Lokteva-Zagorskaia	ROC	1:26.22	1:26.41	1:26.22
28	18	Sina Siegenthaler	Switzerland	1:26.62	1:27.44	1:26.62
29	11	Sofia Belingheri	Italy	1:27.81	1:33.48	1:27.81
30	32	Feng He	China	1:34.31	1:31.25	1:31.25
31	30	Maeva Estévez	Andorra	DNF	DNS	DNF
32	31	Yuka Nakamura	Japan	DNS	DNS	DNS

=== Elimination round ===
==== 1/8 finals ====
Heat 1

Rank	Bib	Name	Country	Notes
1	1	Michela Moioli	Italy	Q
2	16	Meghan Tierney	United States	Q
3	17	Lara Casanova	Switzerland	
	32	Yuka Nakamura	Japan	DNS

Heat 2

Rank	Bib	Name	Country	Notes
1	8	Chloé Trespeuch	France	Q
2	24	Zoe Bergermann	Canada	Q
3	9	Pia Zerkhold	Austria	
4	25	Mariya Vasiltsova	ROC	

Heat 3

Rank	Bib	Name	Country	Notes
1	5	Lindsey Jacobellis	United States	Q
2	28	Sina Siegenthaler	Switzerland	Q
3	12	Manon Petit-Lenoir	France	
4	21	Alexia Queyrel	France	

Heat 4

Rank	Bib	Name	Country	Notes
1	4	Stacy Gaskill	United States	Q
2	13	Audrey McManiman	Canada	Q
3	20	Jana Fischer	Germany	
4	29	Sofia Belingheri	Italy	

Heat 5

Rank	Bib	Name	Country	Notes
1	3	Meryeta O'Dine	Canada	Q
2	19	Aleksandra Parshina	ROC	Q
3	14	Josie Baff	Australia	
4	30	Feng He	China	

Heat 6

Rank	Bib	Name	Country	Notes
1	6	Julia Pereira de Sousa Mabileau	France	Q
2	11	Caterina Carpano	Italy	Q
3	22	Francesca Gallina	Italy	
4	27	Ekaterina Lokteva-Zagorskaia	ROC	

Heat 7

Rank	Bib	Name	Country	Notes
1	7	Faye Gulini	United States	Q
2	26	Tess Critchlow	Canada	Q
3	10	Kristina Paul	ROC	
	23	Vendula Hopjáková	Czech Republic	DNF

Heat 8

Rank	Bib	Name	Country	Notes
1	2	Charlotte Bankes	Great Britain	Q
2	18	Belle Brockhoff	Australia	Q
3	15	Sophie Hediger	Switzerland	
	31	Maeva Estévez	Andorra	DNS

==== Quarterfinals ====
Heat 1

Rank	Bib	Name	Country	Notes
1	1	Michela Moioli	Italy	Q
2	8	Chloé Trespeuch	France	Q
3	16	Meghan Tierney	United States	
4	24	Zoe Bergermann	Canada	

Heat 2

Rank	Bib	Name	Country	Notes
1	5	Lindsey Jacobellis	United States	Q
2	4	Stacy Gaskill	United States	Q
3	13	Audrey McManiman	Canada	
4	28	Sina Siegenthaler	Switzerland	

Heat 3

Rank	Bib	Name	Country	Notes
1	3	Meryeta O'Dine	Canada	Q
2	6	Julia Pereira de Sousa Mabileau	France	Q
3	11	Caterina Carpano	Italy	
4	19	Aleksandra Parshina	ROC	

Heat 4

Rank	Bib	Name	Country	Notes
1	26	Tess Critchlow	Canada	Q
2	18	Belle Brockhoff	Australia	Q
3	2	Charlotte Bankes	Great Britain	
4	7	Faye Gulini	United States	

==== Semifinals ====
Heat 1

Rank	Bib	Name	Country	Notes
1	5	Lindsey Jacobellis	United States	Q
2	8	Chloé Trespeuch	France	Q
3	1	Michela Moioli	Italy	
4	4	Stacy Gaskill	United States	

Heat 2

Rank	Bib	Name	Country	Notes
1	3	Meryeta O'Dine	Canada	Q
2	18	Belle Brockhoff	Australia	Q
3	26	Tess Critchlow	Canada	
	6	Julia Pereira de Sousa Mabileau	France	DNF

==== Finals ====
Small final

Rank	Bib	Name	Country	Notes
5	6	Julia Pereira de Sousa Mabileau	France	
6	26	Tess Critchlow	Canada	
7	4	Stacy Gaskill	United States	
8	1	Michela Moioli	Italy	DNF

Big final

Rank	Bib	Name	Country	Notes
1st place, gold medalist(s)	5	Lindsey Jacobellis	United States	
2nd place, silver medalist(s)	8	Chloé Trespeuch	France	
3rd place, bronze medalist(s)	3	Meryeta O'Dine	Canada	
4	18	Belle Brockhoff	Australia	
