= Snowboarding at the 2019 Winter Universiade – Women's snowboard cross =

Women's snowboard cross at the XXIX Winter Universiade
- Venues: Sopka Cluster
- Dates: 2–3 March 2019
- Competitors: 13 from 8 nations

Medalists
1st place, gold medalist(s)		Kristina Paul	Russia
2nd place, silver medalist(s)		Aleksandra Parshina	Russia
3rd place, bronze medalist(s)		Audrey McManiman	Canada

The women's snowboard cross competition of the 2019 Winter Universiade was held at Sopka Cluster, Krasnoyarsk, Russia on 2 and 3 March 2019.

== Results ==
=== Qualification ===
Rank	Bib	Name	Nation	Run 1	Run 2	Best	Behind
1	7	Kristina Paul	Russia	1:02.71	1:02.50	1:02.50	
2	11	Aleksandra Parshina	Russia	1:04.10	1:03.91	1:03.91	+1.40
3	3	Audrey McManiman	Canada	1:06.31	1:04.71	1:04.71	+2.20
4	6	Mariya Vasiltsova	Russia	1:05.00	1:04.97	1:04.97	+2.46
5	1	Kateřina Louthanová	Czech Republic	1:05.48	1:05.68	1:05.48	+2.97
6	5	Yulia Lapteva	Russia	1:06.08	1:05.69	1:05.69	+3.18
7	9	Stefanie Rieder	Switzerland	1:06.19	1:06.06	1:06.06	+3.55
8	12	Nienke Poll	Netherlands	1:06.49	1:08.31	1:06.49	+3.98
9	2	Dominika Wolska	Poland	1:08.01	1:07.96	1:07.96	+5.45
10	10	Fanny Girardin	Canada	DNF	1:10.38	1:10.38	+7.87
11	8	Sienna Doolan	Australia	1:12.09	1:11.28	1:11.28	+8.77
12	13	Urszula Mendys	Poland	1:25.53	1:22.17	1:22.17	+19.66
13	4	María Agustina Pardo	Argentina	1:50.09	1:22.24	1:22.24	+19.73

=== Round Robin ===
Heat 1

Rank	Bib	Name	Country
1	1	Kristina Paul	Russia
2	4	Mariya Vasiltsova	Russia
3	2	Aleksandra Parshina	Russia
4	10	Fanny Girardin	Canada

Heat 2

Rank	Bib	Name	Country
1	2	Aleksandra Parshina	Russia
2	3	Audrey McManiman	Canada
3	5	Kateřina Louthanová	Czech Republic
4	11	Sienna Doolan	Australia

Heat 3

Rank	Bib	Name	Country
1	3	Audrey McManiman	Canada
2	6	Yulia Lapteva	Russia
3	4	Mariya Vasiltsova	Russia
4	12	Urszula Mendys	Poland

Heat 4

Rank	Bib	Name	Country
1	4	Mariya Vasiltsova	Russia
2	5	Kateřina Louthanová	Czech Republic
3	7	Stefanie Rieder	Switzerland
4	13	María Agustina Pardo	Argentina

Heat 5

Rank	Bib	Name	Country
1	1	Kristina Paul	Russia
2	6	Yulia Lapteva	Russia
3	5	Kateřina Louthanová	Czech Republic
4	8	Nienke Poll	Netherlands

Heat 6

Rank	Bib	Name	Country
1	2	Aleksandra Parshina	Russia
2	6	Yulia Lapteva	Russia
3	7	Stefanie Rieder	Switzerland
4	9	Dominika Wolska	Poland

Heat 7

Rank	Bib	Name	Country
1	3	Audrey McManiman	Canada
2	7	Stefanie Rieder	Switzerland
3	8	Nienke Poll	Netherlands
4	10	Fanny Girardin	Canada

Heat 8

Rank	Bib	Name	Country
1	4	Mariya Vasiltsova	Russia
2	8	Nienke Poll	Netherlands
3	9	Dominika Wolska	Poland
4	11	Sienna Doolan	Australia

Heat 9

Rank	Bib	Name	Country
1	5	Kateřina Louthanová	Czech Republic
2	9	Dominika Wolska	Poland
3	10	Fanny Girardin	Canada
DNS	12	Urszula Mendys	Poland

Heat 10

Rank	Bib	Name	Country
1	6	Yulia Lapteva	Russia
2	10	Fanny Girardin	Canada
3	11	Sienna Doolan	Australia
4	13	María Agustina Pardo	Argentina

Heat 11

Rank	Bib	Name	Country
1	1	Kristina Paul	Russia
2	7	Stefanie Rieder	Switzerland
3	11	Sienna Doolan	Australia
DNS	12	Urszula Mendys	Poland

Heat 12

Rank	Bib	Name	Country
1	2	Aleksandra Parshina	Russia
2	8	Nienke Poll	Netherlands
3	13	María Agustina Pardo	Argentina
DNS	12	Urszula Mendys	Poland

Heat 13

Rank	Bib	Name	Country
1	1	Kristina Paul	Russia
2	3	Audrey McManiman	Canada
3	9	Dominika Wolska	Poland
4	13	María Agustina Pardo	Argentina

==== Results ====
Rank	Name	Country	Heats													Points	Notes
Rank	Name	Country	1	2	3	4	5	6	7	8	9	10	11	12	13	Points	Notes
1	Kristina Paul	Russia	4				4						4		4	16	Q
2	Aleksandra Parshina	Russia	2	4				4						4		14	Q
3	Audrey McManiman	Canada		3	4				4						3	14	Q
4	Yulia Lapteva	Russia			3		3	3				4				13	Q
5	Mariya Vasiltsova	Russia	3		2	4				4						13	Q
6	Kateřina Louthanová	Czech Republic		2		3	2				4					11	Q
7	Stefanie Rieder	Switzerland				2		2	3				3			10	Q
8	Nienke Poll	Netherlands					1		2	3				3		9	Q
9	Dominika Wolska	Poland						1		2	3				2	8	
10	Fanny Girardin	Canada	1						1		2	3				7	
11	Sienna Doolan	Australia		1						1		2	2			6	
12	María Agustina Pardo	Argentina				1						1		2	1	5	
13	Urszula Mendys	Poland			1						0		0	0		1	

=== Semifinals ===
Semifinal 1

Rank	Name	Country	Notes
1	Kristina Paul	Russia	Advance to Big Final
2	Mariya Vasiltsova	Russia	Advance to Big Final
3	Nienke Poll	Netherlands	Advance to Small Final
4	Yulia Lapteva	Russia	Advance to Small Final

Semifinal 2

Rank	Name	Country	Notes
1	Aleksandra Parshina	Russia	Advance to Big Final
2	Audrey McManiman	Russia	Advance to Big Final
3	Stefanie Rieder	Netherlands	Advance to Small Final
4	Kateřina Louthanová	Russia	Advance to Small Final

=== Small Final ===
Rank	Bib	Name	Country
1	6	Kateřina Louthanová	Czech Republic
2	4	Yulia Lapteva	Russia
3	7	Stefanie Rieder	Switzerland
4	8	Nienke Poll	Netherlands

=== Big Final ===
Rank	Bib	Name	Country
1st place, gold medalist(s)	1	Kristina Paul	Russia
2nd place, silver medalist(s)	2	Aleksandra Parshina	Russia
3rd place, bronze medalist(s)	3	Audrey McManiman	Canada
4	5	Mariya Vasiltsova	Russia
