= Léo Le Blé Jaques =

French professional snowboarder (born 1997)

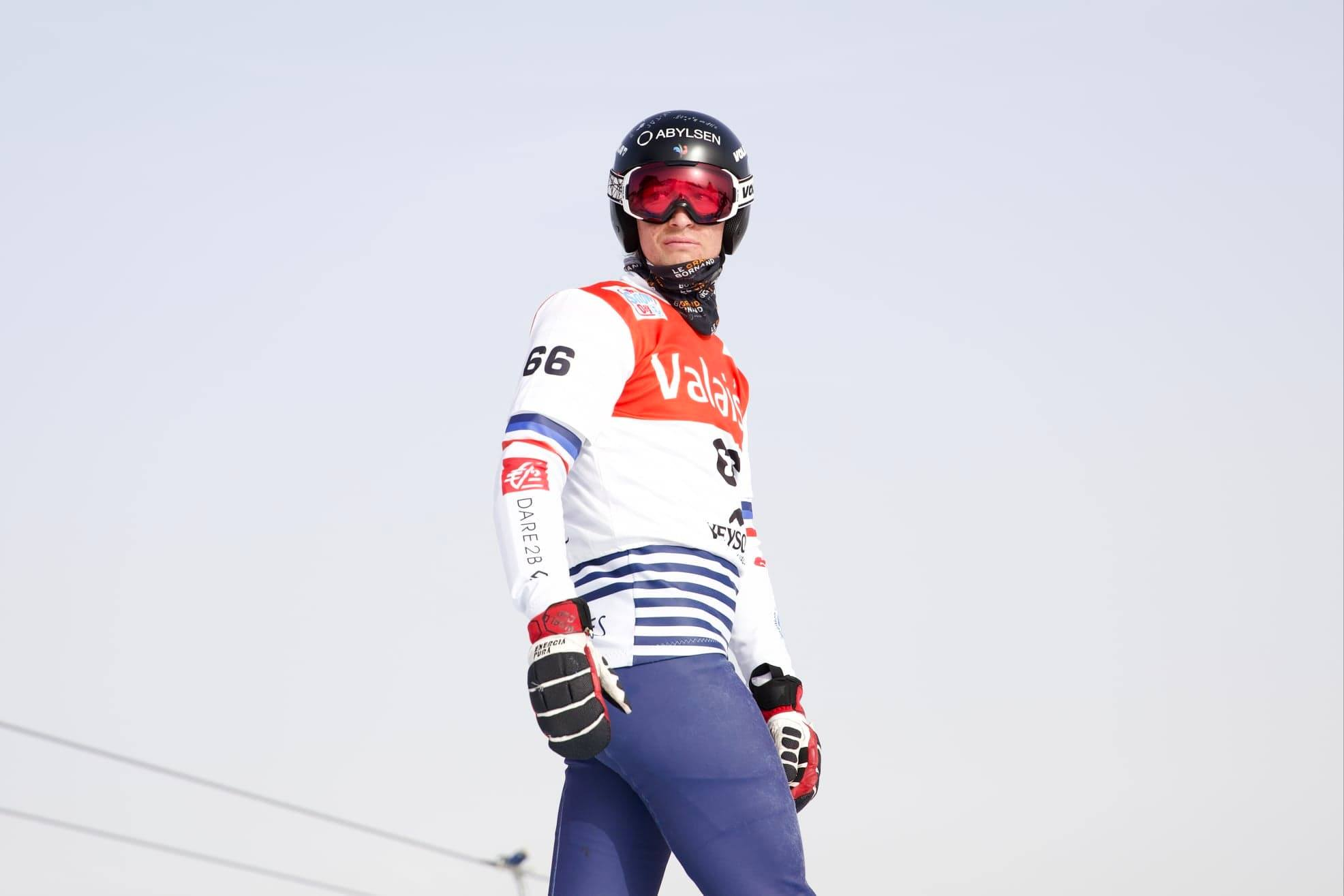

Personal information
- Nationality: French
- Born: 2 January 1997 (age 29) Chêne-Bougeries, Switzerland

Sport
- Country: France
- Sport: Snowboarding
- Event: Snowboard cross
Medal record
Men's snowboarding
Representing France
World Championships
Bronze medal – third place	2021 Idre	Mixed team snowboard cross
Winter Universiade
Gold medal – first place	2017 Almaty	Snowboard cross

Léo Le Blé Jaques (born 2 January 1997) is a French professional snowboarder.

He won the bronze medal in the snowboard cross event at the FIS Freestyle Ski and Snowboarding World Championships 2021.
