= Maisie Potter =

Welsh snowboarder (born 1997)

Maisie Potter (born 15 May 1997) is a Welsh snowboarder, specialised in boardercross, from Bangor. Beginning in the 2016-2017 season, her best result was a quarter final appearance at the FIS Freestyle Ski and Snowboarding World Championships 2017 – Women's snowboard cross in March 2017. Despite reporting she was “one good run away” from an Olympic qualification, she did not compete in 2018 Winter Olympics, but provided analysis for BBC Sport in Pyeongchang.
