= Meghan Tierney =

American snowboarder (born 1997)

Personal information
- Born: January 15, 1997 (age 29) Long Branch, New Jersey, U.S.
- Home town: Eagle, Colorado, U.S.
- Height: 5 ft 9 in (175 cm)

Sport
- Country: United States
- Sport: Snowboarding
- Event: Snowboard Cross

Meghan Tierney (born January 15, 1997) is a two time American Olympic snowboarder who specializes in snowboard cross. She represented the United States at the 2018 and 2022 Winter Olympics.

== Early life, family and education ==
Born in Long Branch, New Jersey, Tierney was raised in nearby Rumson and Little Silver. She began snowboarding at age ten. Her family moved to Edwards, Colorado to allow Meghan and her siblings, Chris, Daniel, and Makayla, to further their snowboarding training. Meghan attended the Vail Ski & Snowboard Academy for her first two years of high school before transferring to the International Snowboard Training Center.

== Career ==
At the Junior level, Tierney placed 4th in snowboard cross (SBX) at the 2014 FIS Junior World Championships and 15th in snowboard cross at the 2016 FIS Junior World Championships. Tierney is the only US athlete ever to win both the NORAM and Europa Cup Championships. She also took 10th place at the 2016 X Games in snowboard cross.

In November 2016, Tierney fell during a training camp in Austria, breaking the L3 vertebrae in her back. The injury forced Tierney to sit out the rest of the 2016–17 season. Tierney placed 25th and 31st in her first World Cup races of the 2017–18 season. Tierney finished the final World Cup race before Olympic selection in seventh, the top-placing American woman at the event. She was selected to compete in snowboard cross for the United States at the 2018 Winter Olympics in Pyeongchang where she placed 17th.

On January 24, 2022, Tierney was named to the 2022 US Olympic Team. She represented the United States at the 2022 Beijing Winter Olympics in snowboard cross where she placed 12th.
