= Snowboarding at the 2015 Winter Universiade – Women's snowboard cross =

The women's snowboard cross competition of the 2015 Winter Universiade was held at Sulayr Snowpark, Sierra Nevada, Spain at February 6, 2015.

The qualification and elimination rounds were completed on February 6.

== Results ==
=== Qualification ===
Rank	Bib	Name	Country	Run 1	Rank	Run 2	Rank	Best	Difference	Notes
1	32	Alexandra Zhekova	Bulgaria	51.98	1	52.62	1	51.98		Q
2	33	Nelly Moenne Loccoz	France	53.38	2	53.10	2	53.10	+1.12	Q
3	27	Simona Meiler	Switzerland	53.51	3	54.12	4	53.51	+1.53	Q
4	25	Chloé Trespeuch	France	54.26	4	53.88	3	53.88	+1.9	Q
5	45	Faye Gulini	United States	54.29	5	54.7	5	54.29	+2.31	Q
6	38	Emma Bernard	France	54.67	6	57.13	12	54.67	+2.69	Q
7	42	Stefanie Rieder	Switzerland	54.76	7	55.81	7	54.76	+2.78	Q
8	43	Zuzanna Smykała	Poland	55.63	8	55.74	6	55.63	+3.65	Q
9	41	Iwadare Karen	Japan	55.69	9	57.04	11	55.69	+3.71	Q
10	34	Kateřina Chourová	Czech Republic	56.01	10	56.43	9	56.01	+4.23	Q
11	20	Elena Garcia	Spain	56.81	12	56.27	8	56.27	+4.29	Q
12	38	Maeva Estevez	Andorra	56.47	11	56.61	10	56.47	+4.49	Q
13	31	Tomida Maria	Japan	58.97	13	59.08	13	58.97	+6.99	Q
14	30	Joanna Zając	Poland	59.98	14	59.28	14	59.28	+7.3	Q
15	26	Jennifer Osborne	Great Britain	1:02.75	15	1:02.14	15	1:02.14	+10.16	Q
16	46	Courtney Cox	United States	1:05.05	16	1:03.7	16	1:03.7	+11.72	Q
17	47	Anna Yamada	United States	1:06.53	17	1:04.87	17	1:04.87	+12.89	
18	48	Teddy Kanner	United States	1:06.71	18	1:05.58	18	1:05.58	+13.6	
	19	Deborah Pleisch	Switzerland							DNS
	39	Paola Blašković	Croatia							DNS
	44	Amber Arazny	Australia							DNS

=== Elimination round ===
==== Quarterfinals ====
Quarterfinal 1

Rank	Bib	Athlete	Country	Note
1	1	Alexandra Zhekova	Bulgaria	Q
2	8	Zuzanna Smykała	Poland	Q
3	9	Iwadare Karen	Japan	
4	16	Courtney Cox	United States	

Quarterfinal 2

Rank	Bib	Athlete	Country	Note
1	4	Chloé Trespeuch	France	Q
2	5	Faye Gulini	United States	Q
3	12	Maeva Estevez	Andorra	
4	13	Tomida Maria	Japan	

Quarterfinal 3

Rank	Bib	Athlete	Country	Note
1	3	Simona Meiler	Switzerland	Q
2	6	Emma Bernard	France	Q
3	11	Elena Garcia	Spain	
4	14	Joanna Zając	Poland	

Quarterfinal 4

Rank	Bib	Athlete	Country	Note
1	2	Nelly Moenne Loccoz	France	Q
2	7	Stefanie Rieder	Switzerland	Q
3	10	Kateřina Chourová	Czech Republic	
4	15	Jennifer Osborne	Great Britain	

==== Semifinals ====
Semifinal 1

Rank	Bib	Athlete	Country	Note
1	1	Alexandra Zhekova	Bulgaria	Q
2	4	Chloé Trespeuch	France	Q
3	8	Zuzanna Smykała	Poland	
4	5	Faye Gulini	United States	

Semifinal 2

Rank	Bib	Athlete	Country	Note
1	2	Nelly Moenne Loccoz	France	Q
2	3	Simona Meiler	Switzerland	Q
3	6	Emma Bernard	France	
4	7	Stefanie Rieder	Switzerland	

==== Finals ====
Small Final

Rank	Bib	Athlete	Country	Note
5	7	Stefanie Rieder	Switzerland	
6	5	Faye Gulini	United States	
7	8	Zuzanna Smykała	Poland	
8	6	Emma Bernard	France	

Big Final

Rank	Bib	Athlete	Country	Note
1st place, gold medalist(s)	1	Alexandra Zhekova	Bulgaria	
2nd place, silver medalist(s)	4	Chloé Trespeuch	France	
3rd place, bronze medalist(s)	3	Simona Meiler	Switzerland	
4	2	Nelly Moenne Loccoz	France	
