= Jarryd Hughes =

Australian snowboarder (born 1995)

Personal information
- Nationality: Australian
- Born: 21 May 1995 (age 31) Sydney, New South Wales, Australia
- Height: 1.79 m (5 ft 10 in)
- Weight: 80 kg (176 lb)

Sport
- Country: Australia
- Sport: Snowboarding
- Event: Snowboard cross
Medal record
Men's snowboarding
Representing Australia
Olympic Games
Silver medal – second place	2018 Pyeongchang	Snowboard cross
World Championships
Gold medal – first place	2021 Idre	Mixed team snowboard cross
Winter X Games
Gold medal – first place	2016 Aspen	Snowboard cross

Jarryd Hughes (born 21 May 1995) is an Australian snowboarder. He achieved second in boardercross at the 2018 PyeongChang Winter Olympics.

== Career ==
He competed at the 2012 FIS Snowboard World Cup as a 16-year-old and came in at 10th place at the Stoneham World Cup in Quebec, Canada. Since his debut he has gone on to win a Gold and a Silver Medal at the FIS Junior World Championships, win the Lake Louise World Cup in 2013 and represent Australia at the Sochi 2014 Winter Olympics.

While still one of the youngest athletes on the World Cup Tour, Jarryd has been a consistent performer in the top-10 on the World Cup Circuit and been the youngest ever World number-one. In January 2016, Jarryd won Gold in the Snowboardcross event at X Games in Aspen Colorado making him the youngest ever winner and the first Australian male to win a Gold Medal at Winter X. He won the Silver Medal at the 2018 Winter Olympics.
