= Maria Laach am Jauerling =

- Municipality
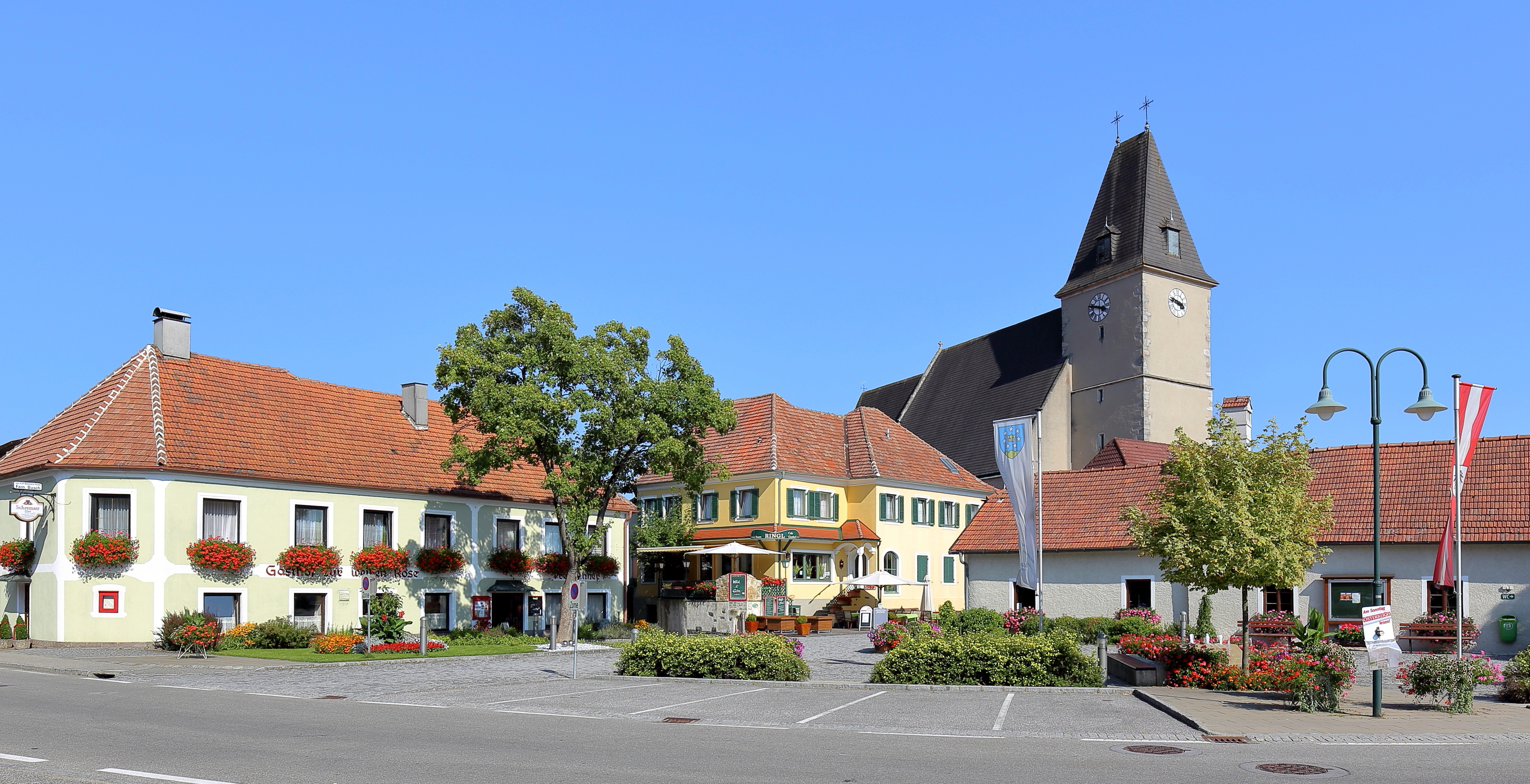
- Town center

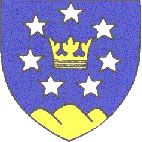
- Coat of arms

- Location within Austria
- Coordinates: 48°18′N 15°21′E
- Country: Austria
- State: Lower Austria
- District: Krems-Land

Government
  - Mayor: Josef Maurer

Area
  - Total: 36.45 km^{2} (14.07 sq mi)
- Elevation: 591 m (1,939 ft)

Population (2018-01-01)
  - Total: 916
  - Density: 25.1/km^{2} (65.1/sq mi)
- Time zone: UTC+1 (CET)
  - Summer (DST): UTC+2 (CEST)
- Postal code: 3643
- Area code: 02712
- Website: www.marialaach.at

Maria Laach am Jauerling is a town in the district of Krems-Land in the Austrian state of Lower Austria.

== Population ==
Historical population
Year	Pop.	±%
1971	965	—
1981	1,015	+5.2%
1991	923	−9.1%
2001	963	+4.3%
