= Sofya Fyodorova =

Russian snowboarder

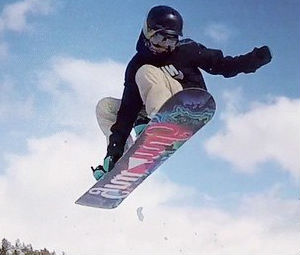

Personal information
- Nationality: Russia
- Born: 4 September 1998 (age 27) Moscow, Russia
- Height: 1.64 m (5 ft 5 in)

Sport
- Sport: Skiing

World Cup career
- Indiv. podiums: 1
- Indiv. wins: 1
- Discipline titles: 1

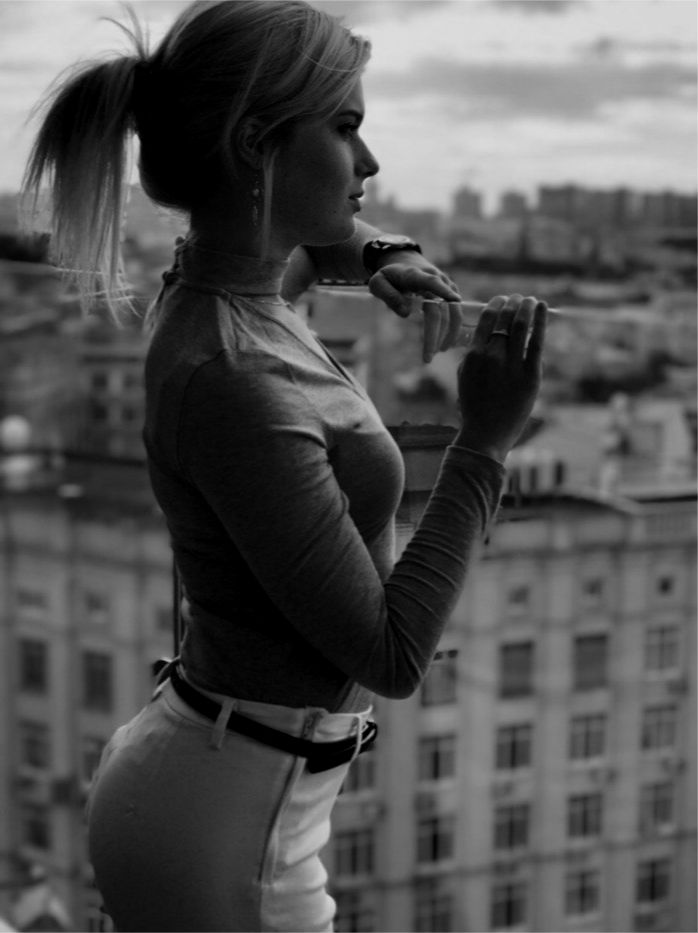
Sofya Fyodorova in 2017

Sofya Vyacheslavovna Fyodorova (alternatively romanized as Fedorova) (Russian: Софья Вячеславовна Фёдорова; born 4 September 1998) is a Russian snowboarder.

== Biography ==
Sofya was born in Moscow. She began snowboarding at age 13.

In the 2013–14 season she took second place in the Russian Championship in slopestyle and third place in the halfpipe. In the 2014-15 season she won the national championships and the Russia Student Games, both in halfpipe. In the 2015–16 season she won three European Cups in slopestyle. In 2015, she won the Junior World Championship in big air. In 2018 she won the overall World Cup in slopestyle.

Fyodorova is an Honored Master of Sports of Russia (2019).

== World Cup podiums ==
=== Race Podiums ===
- 1 wins – (1 SBS)
- 1 podiums – (1 SBS)

| Season | Date | Location | Discipline | Place |
|---|---|---|---|---|
| 2017–18 | 16 March 2018 | Seiser Alm, Italy | Slopestyle | 1st |

=== Season titles ===
- 1 title – (1 slopestyle)

| Season | Discipline |
|---|---|
| 2018 | Slopestyle |
