= Julia Pereira de Sousa Mabileau =

French snowboarder (born 2001)

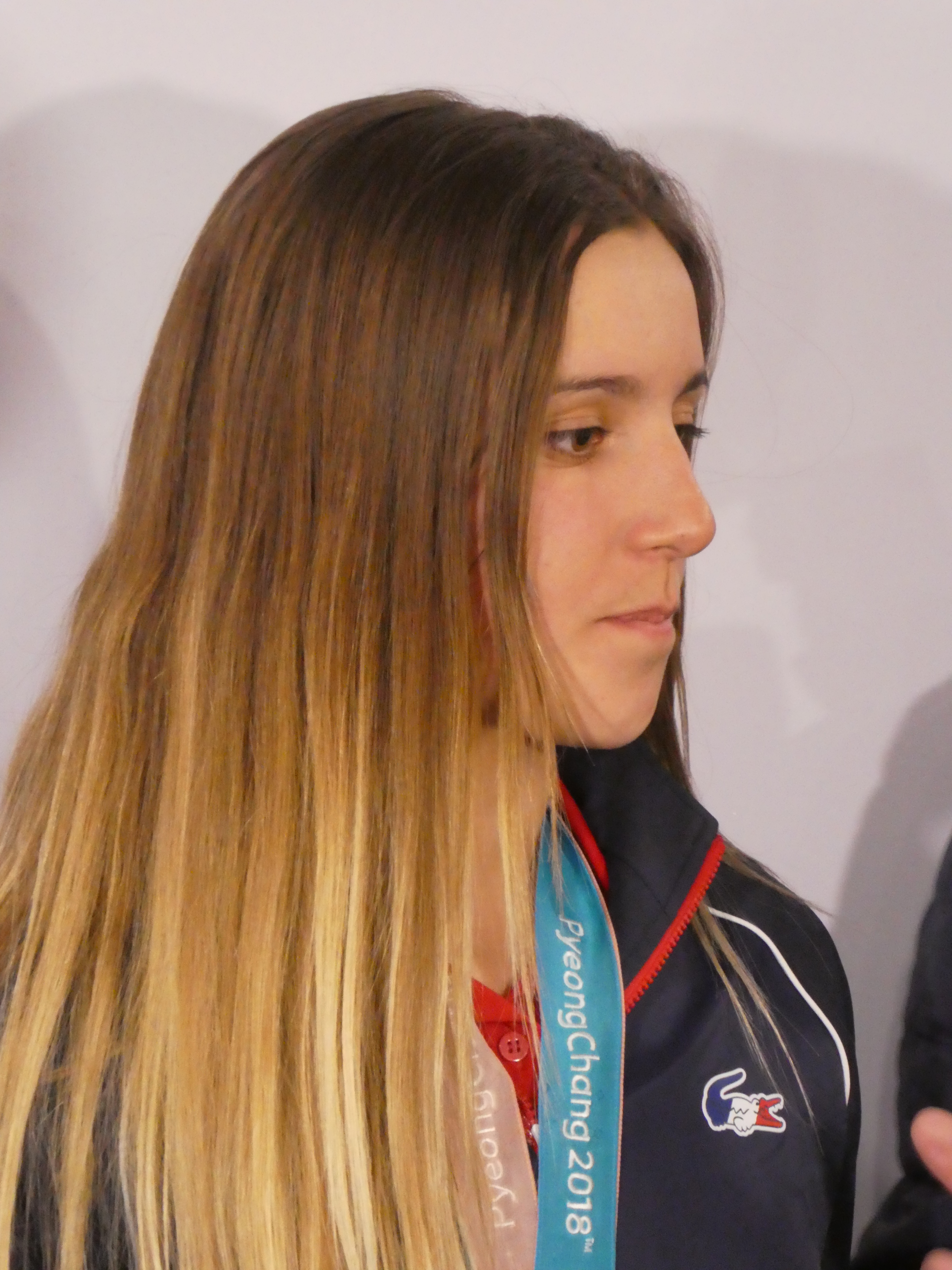

Personal information
- Nationality: French
- Born: 20 September 2001 (age 25) Quincy-sous-Sénart, France
- Height: 1.74 m (5 ft 9 in)
- Weight: 60 kg (132 lb)

Sport
- Country: France
- Sport: Snowboarding
- Event: Snowboard cross
Medal record
Women's snowboarding
Representing France
Olympic Games
Silver medal – second place	2018 Pyeongchang	Snowboard cross
World Championships
Gold medal – first place	2025 Engadin	Mixed snowboard team cross
Bronze medal – third place	2021 Idre	Mixed team snowboard cross
Bronze medal – third place	2025 Engadin	Snowboard cross
- Updated on 12 February 2021

Julia Pereira de Sousa Mabileau (born 20 September 2001) is a French snowboarder competing in snowboard cross.

She qualified for the 2018 Winter Olympics in Pyeongchang and won the silver medal in the snowboard cross. She competed at the 2022 Winter Olympics, in Women's snowboard cross.

== Career ==
She was 16 years old when she competed at Pyeongchang, making her the youngest French National to win a Winter Olympic medal. Julia finished her quarter-final in second place, behind Italian rider Michela Moioli in a premonition of the Big Final. Julia raced in the day's second semi-final and finished in third place behind her compatriot Chloé Trespeuch in second and Michela Moioli in first.

The track at Phoenix Park is 1300m long, and for almost a kilometre of the Big Final, Julia was in 4th position, but in the final few hundred meters, she found a racing line that saw her pass everyone but Moioli to finish second and win Olympic silver.

Alongside her life as a professional snowboard cross athlete, Julia is in full-time education. "Currently, I am studying at the Lycée Of Albertville in Savoie, where I will sit my Baccalauréat of French next month and where I train physically every day. I’ve already started my preparation for next winter." Julia said.

== Personal life ==
Born in France, Pereira de Sousa Mabileau is of Portuguese descent.
