= Giulia Manfrini =

Italian surfer and snowboarder (1988–2024)

- Born: 11 August 1988; Venaria Reale, Italy
- Died: 18 October 2024 (aged 36); Indonesia
- Cause of death: Swordfish injury to the heart
- Education: University of Turin
- Occupations: Surfer, snowboarder
- Years active: 1988-2024
- Known for: Surfing and skiing

Giulia Manfrini (11 August 1988 – 18 October 2024) was an Italian surfer who also competed in snowboarding and skiing.

== Biography ==
Manfrini was born in Venaria Reale, Turin. She was involved in sports as a child beginning with skiing and then moving to snowboarding. She won the Italian Youth Cup in 2006–07. She graduated in 2013 from the University of Turin having studied law. Manfrini was a well-known figure in the Italian surfing community. She had more than 22,000 followers on Instagram. Manfrini was a co-founder of Awave Travel, a travel agency. Manfrini was a surf coach and a professional snowboarder who competed in the 2009 Winter Universiade in China.

== Death ==
Manfrini died in October 2024 at the age of 36. She had been holidaying in Masokut island in Indonesia. Authorities said she had been impaled by a swordfish while surfing.
