= Anna Gyarmati =

Hungarian snowboarder (born 1993)

Personal information
- Nationality: Hungarian
- Born: 1993 (age 32–33) Eger, Hungary

Sport
- Sport: Snowboarding

Anna Gyarmati (born 1993) is a Hungarian snowboarder. She competed at the FIS Freestyle Ski and Snowboarding World Championships 2015, where she qualified for the slopestyle final, and placed sixth in the final.
