= Alexandra Hasler =

Swiss snowboarder (born 1997)

Personal information
- Nationality: Swiss
- Born: 1 June 1997 (age 28)
- Height: 1.70 m (5 ft 7 in)

Sport
- Sport: Snowboarding

Alexandra Hasler (born 1 June 1997) is a Swiss snowboarder. She competed in the 2018 Winter Olympics.
