= Meryeta O'Dine =

Canadian snowboarder (born 1997)

Personal information
- Born: February 24, 1997 (age 29) Prince George, British Columbia, Canada
- Height: 170 cm (5 ft 7 in)
- Weight: 63 kg (139 lb)

Sport
- Country: Canada
- Sport: Snowboarding
Medal record
Women's snowboarding
Representing Canada
Olympic Games
Bronze medal – third place	2022 Beijing	Snowboard cross
Bronze medal – third place	2022 Beijing	Mixed team snowboard cross

Meryeta O'Dine (born February 24, 1997) is a Canadian snowboarder, competing in the discipline of snowboard cross. She won two bronze medals in Women's snowboard cross, and Mixed team snowboard cross at the 2022 Winter Olympics in Beijing.

== Career ==
=== Early career ===
O'Dine’s first major medal was when she won a gold medal competing for British Columbia at the 2015 Canada Winter Games. She started snowboarding competitively for Canada during the 2016–17 FIS Snowboard World Cup season and secured her first podium finish when she won the bronze at the stop in Feldberg, Germany. This came after early season injuries nearly derailed the season, she had suffered a concussion in September 2016 and nearly ruptured her ligament after that, but still suffered a bruised heel. The following season she continued to perform well, with eight top 10 finishes, and she paired well with Zoe Bergermann in women's team snowboard cross. With her good run of form, O'Dine was named to Canada's 2018 Olympic team in the snowboard cross event. However, O'Dine was unable to compete as she suffered another concussion in training and ending her Olympic dream that year.

Following her brother's death in 2020, O'Dine took some time off from competition, as this occurred at the same time as the COVID-19 pandemic. She returned to competition in January 2021 and was once again on the slopes for the World Cup season. At the 2021 World Championships, a fourth-fastest qualifying time saw her return to form, though she was eliminated in the first heat after a crash.

=== 2022 Winter Olympics ===
She was named to Canada's 2022 Olympic team to compete in her event of snowboard cross. Just as in the 2021 World Championships O'Dine would have a strong qualifying run, finishing with the third fastest time in qualifying. She would continue her strong showing in the heats, winning every one on her way to the big final. In the final, her start saw her trail Chloé Trespeuch and Lindsey Jacobellis, finishing behind the pair for her first Olympic medal, a bronze. After her win she told CBC Sports that "So far, it's pretty surreal. I'm so excited, I'm motivated for the future, but overall I would say it's just surreal." O'dine would later win the bronze medal in the inaugural mixed team snowboard cross event with compatriot Éliot Grondin.

She qualified for the 2026 Olympics but had to withdraw because of an injury.

== Personal life ==
O'Dine's brother was diagnosed with a brain tumour and died in 2020. This traumatic event forced her to stop competing as she took time away from the sport and saw a psychologist. O'Dine says she asked herself whether she wanted to keep being an athlete, saying that she wondered, "Is this really what you want? Is this realistic? Is this possible?" She overcame her mental health battles and found joy in the sport again. She told CBC Sports that mental training is just as important as physical training.
