= Carle Brenneman =

Canadian snowboarder

Personal information
- Born: September 23, 1989 (age 36) Richmond, British Columbia, Canada
- Height: 170 cm (5 ft 7 in)
- Weight: 61 kg (134 lb)

Sport
- Country: Canada
- Sport: Snowboarding

Achievements and titles
- Olympic finals: 2018 Winter Olympics

Carle Brenneman (born September 23, 1989) is a Canadian snowboarder, competing in the discipline of snowboard cross.

== Career ==
Brenneman has been with the national team since 2011, and was chosen as an alternate for the 2014 Winter Olympics in Sochi, Russia. Brenneman made her World Cup debut in February 2009. Brenneman became a full-time world cup member during the 2010–11 season, where she posted her career-best finish, fifth in Arosa, Switzerland, Brenneman also matched that result in February 2016 in Russia.

=== 2018 Winter Olympics ===
In January 2018, Brenneman was named to Canada's 2018 Olympic team.
