= Jenna Blasman =

Canadian snowboarder (born 1993)

Personal information
- Nationality: Canadian
- Born: 24 September 1993 (age 32) Kitchener, Ontario
- Height: 1.57 m (5 ft 2 in)
- Weight: 58 kg (128 lb)

Sport
- Country: Canada
- Sport: Snowboarding

Jenna Blasman (born September 24, 1993) is a Canadian snowboarder. She competes in slopestyle and represented Canada in this event at the 2014 Winter Olympics in Sochi.
