= Zuzanna Smykała =

Polish snowboarder (born 1990)

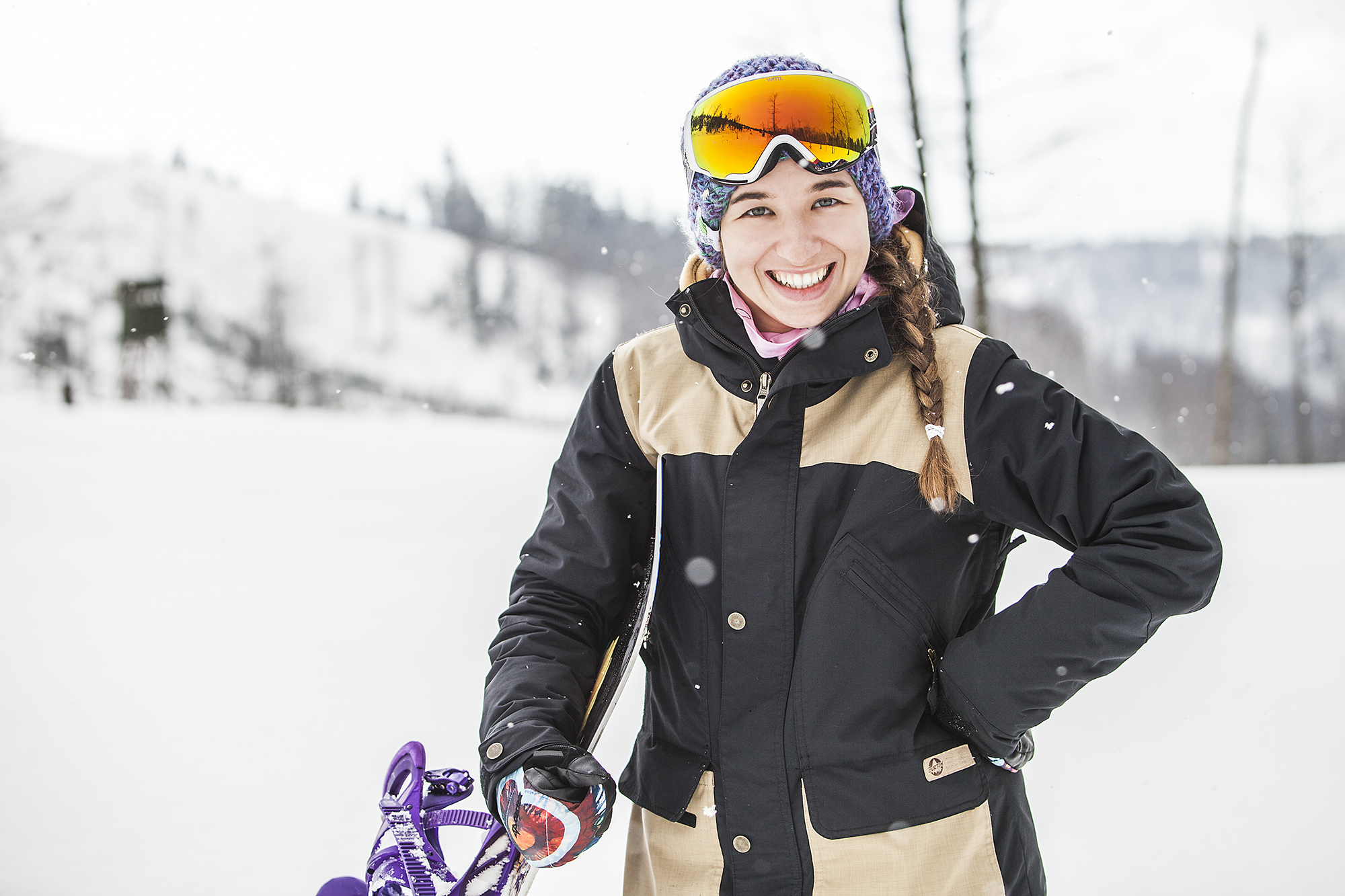

Zuzanna Smykała (born 10 January 1990 in Chorzów) is a Polish snowboarder. She competed for Poland in the snowboard cross at the 2018 Winter Olympics, finishing 23rd in qualifying and fifth in Heat 4, eliminating her from the competition. Smykała had previously finished seventh in the snowboard cross at the 2015 Winter Universiade.
