= Kateřina Vojáčková =

Czech snowboarder (born 1997)

Personal information
- Nationality: Czech
- Born: 24 January 1997 (age 29)
- Height: 1.58 m (5 ft 2 in)

Sport
- Sport: Snowboarding

Kateřina Vojáčková (born 24 January 1997) is a Czech snowboarder. She competed in the 2018 Winter Olympics.
