= Karly Shorr =

American snowboarder (born 1994)

Personal information
- Born: Karly Piper Shorr; May 18, 1994 (age 31) Commerce Township, Michigan, U.S.
- Years active: 2008–present
- Height: 5 ft 8 in (173 cm)
- Weight: 146 lb (66 kg)

Sport
- Country: United States
- Sport: Snowboarding
- Event: Women's slopestyle

Achievements and titles
- Olympic finals: Sochi 2014
- Updated on 7 February 2014

Karly Piper Shorr (born May 18, 1994) is an American snowboarder. She competed in the 2014 Winter Olympics in Sochi, Russia, where she placed sixth in women's slopestyle.

Shorr was born in Commerce Township, Michigan and graduated from Milford High School in 2012.

Karly Shorr in 2016 earning podium finishes at the Burton US Open, the Olympic test event in Pyeongchang, South Korea and the U.S. Grand Prix at Mammoth Mountain.

== Career Results ==
Olympic Experience

2014 Olympic Winter Games, 6th in women's slopestyle

Career Highlights

2013–14 Copper Mountain U.S. Grand Prix/World Cup, 10th

2013–14 Cardrona World Cup, 9th

Two-time 2013–14 Mammoth Mountain U.S. Grand Prix second-place finisher

2012–13 Copper Mountain U.S. Grand Prix/World Cup, 11th

2011–12 Mammoth Mountain U.S. Grand Prix, 3rd

2nd, SS, PyeongChang, KOR, 2016

Four-time U.S. Revolution Tour champion
