= Julia Marino (snowboarder) =

American snowboarder (born 1997)

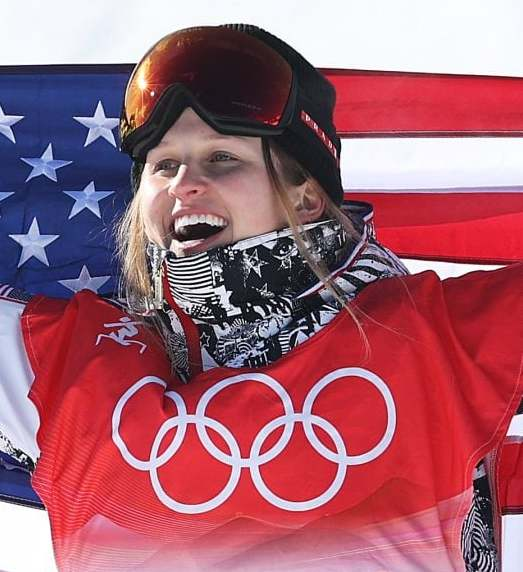

Personal information
- Nickname: Jules
- Born: September 11, 1997 (age 28) Yonkers, New York, U.S.
- Height: 5 ft 5 in (165 cm)
- Weight: 125 lb (57 kg)
Medal record
Women's snowboarding
Representing the United States
Winter Olympics
Silver medal – second place	2022 Beijing	Slopestyle
Winter X Games
Gold medal – first place	2017 Aspen	SlopeStyle
Silver medal – second place	2017 Hafjell	Big Air
Silver medal – second place	2018 Aspen	SlopeStyle
Bronze medal – third place	2017 Aspen	Big Air
Bronze medal – third place	2017 Hafjell	SlopeStyle

Julia (Jules) Marino (born September 11, 1997) is an American snowboarder from Westport, Connecticut living in Quebec who competes in the Slopestyle and Big Air disciplines.

== Early life ==
Marino was born in Westport, Connecticut, which she says was close enough to the mountains to make weekend trips to ski slopes. Her family would visit Beaver Creek, Colorado once a year to ski on bigger mountains than in the east. She has a younger sister named Cece, and also skateboarded as a child. She had been skiing since age 3, but tried snowboarding for the first time at age 9, and fell in love with it and began competing at age 12 after snowboarding for the remainder of a trip after breaking a ski. Marino says that she continued skiing as well as snowboard until age 14 when she decided to seriously pursue snowboarding. She joined the Stratton Mountain School weekend program in Vermont when she was 13, and attended full time the following winter. When she was 15, she moved to Breckenridge Colorado, for the winter with her father, and spent the next winter in Vail, Colorado. She attended St. Joseph High School in Trumbull, Connecticut, playing soccer in the fall before switching to online school for winter and spring to accommodate her training and competition, eventually completing her senior year entirely online. After being named to the US Snowboarding Team and receiving a Division I scholarship offer for soccer during her junior year, Marino chose to pursue snowboarding professionally instead of continuing in soccer. She lists Nora Vasconcellos as one of her inspirations.

== Career ==
As a rookie, in the 2017 X Games at Aspen's Buttermilk Mountain, she won gold in Slopestyle and a bronze in Big Air, the first female snowboard athlete to win two medals at the same Games in 17 years. On her gold medal run, she became the first female to land a Cab 900 double underflip in an X Games women's Slopestyle contest. She followed this up at the X Games in Hafjell, Norway with a silver in Big Air and a bronze in Slopestyle, for a total of four X Games medals in her rookie year.

In all, Marino had eight podiums in international and elite events during the 2017-18 competition season.

In 2020, Marino built a snowpark in her backyard so she could continue training during the COVID-19 pandemic.

Marino competed in the 2022 Beijing Olympics, winning silver in the women's snowboard slopestyle. She was originally set to compete in the big air event as well, but pulled out prior to the competition due to a fall she suffered in practice earlier in the week. However, Marino later said that she had to withdraw due to a dispute with IOC officials regarding a logo visible on her snowboard. Marino, who is sponsored by Prada, was required to cover the logo on her helmet earlier in the week for the slopestyle competition, but the logo on her snowboard was permitted. However, IOC officials later flagged the logo on the bottom of her snowboard as well and Marino claimed that she was told she would be disqualified from the big air event if she did not cover the logo. After covering the logo in marker, Marino stated that she felt that she was not able to gain enough speed on her board and withdrew from the competition as she felt unsteady competing on her modified board with an injury.

Marino missed the 2026 Olympics with an injury.

== See also ==
- Winter X Games XXI
