= Jessika Jenson =

American snowboarder (born 1991)

Personal information
- Born: August 7, 1991 (age 34) Idaho Falls, Idaho, U.S.
- Height: 5 ft 5 in (165 cm)
- Weight: 119 lb (54 kg)

Sport
- Country: United States
- Sport: Snowboarding

Jessika Jenson (born August 7, 1991) is an American snowboarder born in Idaho Falls, Idaho She represented the United States at the 2014 Winter Olympics in Sochi and the 2018 Winter Olympics in PyeongChang, where she finished 5th in slopestyle and made the finals in big air.
