= Vendula Hopjáková =

Czech snowboarder (born 1996)

Personal information
- Nationality: Czech
- Born: 10 June 1996 (age 29) Olomouc, Czech Republic
- Height: 1.75 m (5 ft 9 in)

Sport
- Sport: Snowboarding

Vendula Hopjáková (born 10 June 1996) is a Czech former snowboarder. She competed in the 2018 Winter Olympics. and in the 2022 Winter Olympics, in Women's snowboard cross.
