= Silvia Mittermüller =

German snowboarder

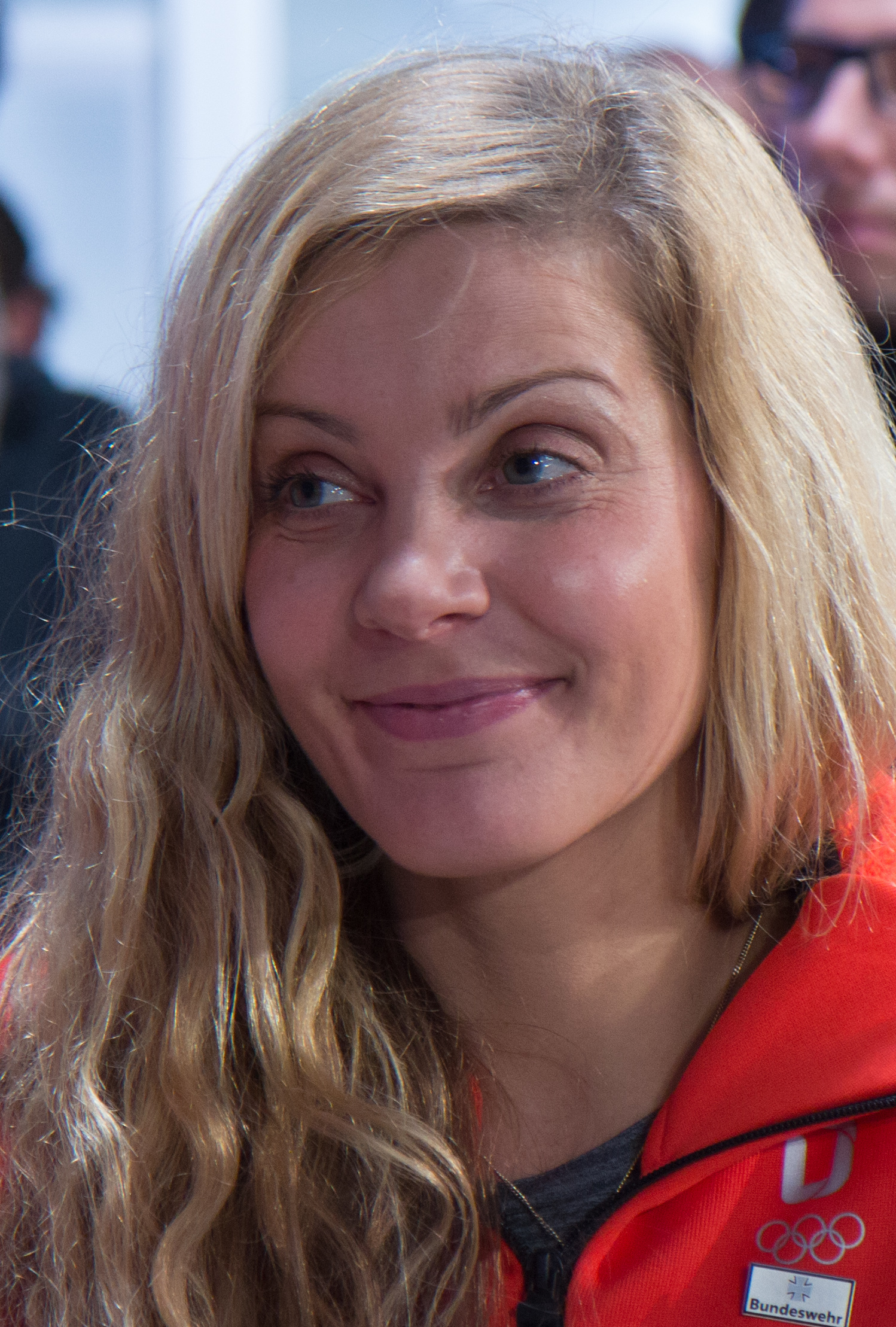
Portrait of Silvia Mittermüller

Silvia Mittermüller (born 8 August 1983 in Munich) is a German snowboarder. Born in Munich, Germany, Mittermüller currently trains in the United States. She competes on the Swatch TTR World Snowboard Tour. She has sponsorship deals with Ride Snowboards, Oakley, Vans and Planet Sports.

== Competition Results ==
Highlights of the Swatch TTR 2008/2009 Season

- 4th - Slopestyle - 6Star Burton European Open - Ticket to Ride (World Snowboard Tour)
- 1st - Slopestyle - 5Star Burton Canadian Open - Ticket to Ride (World Snowboard Tour)
- 3rd - Slopestyle - 5Star Nissan X-Trail Jam - Ticket to Ride (World Snowboard Tour)
