= Kristina Paul =

Russian snowboarder (born 1998)

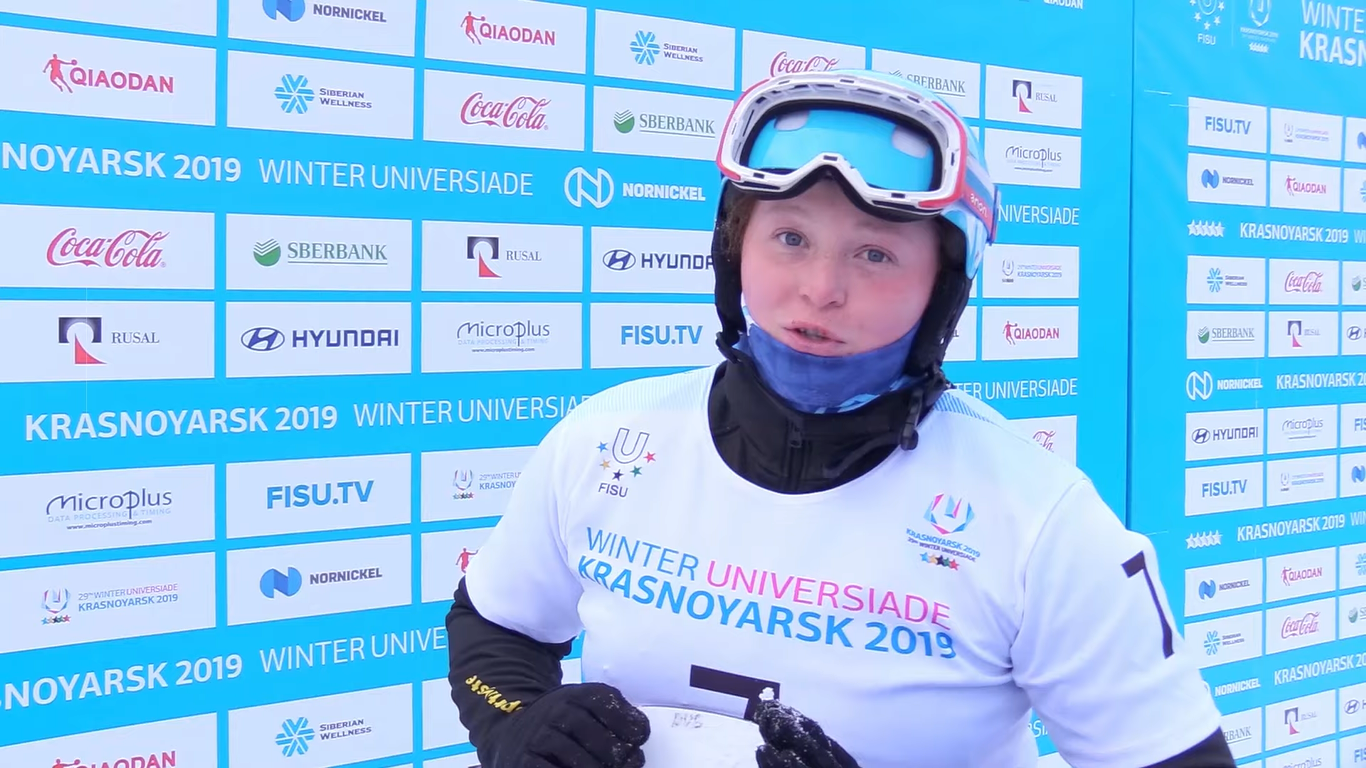
- Kristina Paul at 2019 Winter Universiade

Personal information
- Full name: Kristina Yosifovna Paul
- Nationality: Russian
- Born: 22 February 1998 (age 28) Tashtagol, Russia
- Height: 1.69 m (5 ft 7 in)

Sport
- Sport: Snowboarding
- Event: Snowboard cross
Medal record
Representing Russia
Winter Universiade
Gold medal – first place	2019 Krasnoyarsk	Snowboard cross

Kristina Yosifovna Paul (Russian: Кристина Иосифовна Пауль; born 22 February 1998) is a Russian snowboarder. She competed in the 2018 Winter Olympics.

At the 2019 World Championships, Paul was the only Russian to qualify to the quarterfinals. She competed at the 2022 Winter Olympics, in Women's snowboard cross.
