= Tess Critchlow =

Canadian snowboarder (born 1995)

Personal information
- Born: June 20, 1995 (age 31) Prince George, British Columbia, Canada
- Height: 170 cm (5 ft 7 in)
- Weight: 63 kg (139 lb)

Sport
- Country: Canada
- Sport: Snowboarding

Achievements and titles
- Olympic finals: 2018 Winter Olympics

Tess Critchlow (born June 20, 1995) is a Canadian snowboarder, competing in the discipline of snowboard cross.

== Career ==
=== Winter Olympics ===
In January 2018, Critchlow was named to Canada's 2018 Olympic team.

In January 2022, Critchlow was named to Canada's 2022 Olympic team.
