= Zoe Bergermann =

Canadian snowboarder

Personal information
- Born: April 28, 1994 (age 32) Georgetown, Ontario, Canada
- Height: 170 cm (5 ft 7 in)
- Weight: 63 kg (139 lb)

Sport
- Country: Canada
- Sport: Snowboarding
- Club: Caledon Ski Club
- Coached by: Jon Casson

Achievements and titles
- Highest world ranking: 2nd

Zoe Bergermann (born April 28, 1994) is a Canadian snowboarder, competing in the discipline of snowboard cross. She competed at the 2022 Winter Olympics, in Women's snowboard cross.

== Life ==
She was born in Georgetown, and grew up in Erin, Ontario, at which point she'd practice at Caledon Ski Club.

== Career ==
=== Winter Olympics ===
In January 2018, Bergermann was named to Canada's 2018 Olympic team. She placed 23rd in the women's snowboard cross.

In January 2022, Bergermann was named to Canada's 2022 Olympic team.
