= Mariya Vasiltsova =

Russian snowboarder (born 1995)

Personal information
- Full name: Mariya Evgenyevna Vasiltsova
- Nationality: Russian
- Born: 22 June 1995 (age 30) Novosibirsk, Russia
- Height: 1.68 m (5 ft 6 in)

Sport
- Sport: Snowboarding

Mariya Evgenyevna Vasiltsova (Russian: Мария Евгеньевна Васильцова; born 22 June 1995) is a Russian snowboarder. She competed in the 2018 Winter Olympics and in the 2022 Winter Olympics, in Women's snowboard cross.
