= Snowboarding at the 2014 Winter Olympics – Women's snowboard cross =

Women's snowboard cross at the XXII Olympic Winter Games
- Venue: Rosa Khutor Extreme Park
- Date: 16 February 2014
- Competitors: 24 from 14 nations

Medalists
1st place, gold medalist(s)		Eva Samková	Czech Republic
2nd place, silver medalist(s)		Dominique Maltais	Canada
3rd place, bronze medalist(s)		Chloé Trespeuch	France

The women's snowboard cross competition of the Sochi 2014 Olympics was held at Rosa Khutor Extreme Park on 16 February 2014.

== Schedule ==
All times are (UTC+4).

Date	Time	Round
16 February	11:00	Seeding
16 February	13:15	Quarterfinals
16 February	13:30	Semifinals
16 February	13:40	Finals

== Results ==
=== Seeding ===
The seeding was started at 11:00.

Rank	Bib	Name	Country	Run 1	Run 2	Best	Notes
1	5	Eva Samková	Czech Republic	1:20.61		1:20.61	
2	15	Lindsey Jacobellis	United States	1:21.40		1:21.40	
3	16	Dominique Maltais	Canada	1:22.26		1:22.26	
4	11	Maëlle Ricker	Canada	1:22.44		1:22.44	
5	13	Charlotte Bankes	France	1:23.12		1:23.12	
6	14	Yuka Fujimori	Japan	1:23.22		1:23.22	
7	19	Belle Brockhoff	Australia	1:23.22		1:23.22	
8	10	Nelly Moenne Loccoz	France	1:23.50		1:23.50	
9	2	Faye Gulini	United States	1:23.96		1:23.96	
10	23	Sandra Daniela Gerber	Switzerland	1:24.10		1:24.10	
11	8	Aleksandra Zhekova	Bulgaria	1:24.29		1:24.29	
12	18	Isabel Clark Ribeiro	Brazil	1:24.31		1:24.31	
13	12	Chloé Trespeuch	France	1:24.47	1:23.43	1:23.43	
14	9	Zoe Gillings	Great Britain	1:24.72	1:23.78	1:23.78	
15	22	Torah Bright	Australia	1:25.32	1:23.96	1:23.96	
16	24	Déborah Anthonioz	France	1:24.78	1:24.23	1:24.23	
17	21	Maria Ramberger	Austria	1:24.55	1:24.45	1:24.45	
18	3	Michela Moioli	Italy	1:24.72	DNS	1:24.72	
19	7	Raffaella Brutto	Italy	1:25.11	DNS	1:25.11	
20	4	Simona Meiler	Switzerland	1:25.17	1:25.47	1:25.17	
21	20	Susanne Moll	Austria	1:25.43	DSQ	1:25.43	
22	17	Bell Berghuis	Netherlands	1:28.19	1:28.70	1:28.19	
	1	Helene Olafsen	Norway	DNF	DNS	DNF	
	6	Jacqueline Hernandez	United States	DNF	DNS	DNF	

=== Elimination round ===
==== Quarterfinals ====
From here, the athletes participated in six-person elimination races, with the top three from each race advancing.

Quarterfinal 1

Rank	Bib	Name	Country	Notes
1	1	Eva Samková	Czech Republic	Q
2	8	Nelly Moenne Loccoz	France	Q
3	9	Faye Gulini	United States	Q
4	16	Déborah Anthonioz	France	
5	17	Maria Ramberger	Austria	
DNS	24	Jacqueline Hernandez	United States	

Quarterfinal 2

Rank	Bib	Name	Country	Notes
1	13	Chloé Trespeuch	France	Q
2	20	Simona Meiler	Switzerland	Q
3	21	Susanne Moll	Austria	Q
4	12	Isabel Clark Ribeiro	Brazil	
5	5	Charlotte Bankes	France	
	4	Maëlle Ricker	Canada	DNF

Quarterfinal 3

Rank	Bib	Name	Country	Notes
1	3	Dominique Maltais	Canada	Q
2	11	Aleksandra Zhekova	Bulgaria	Q
3	14	Zoe Gillings	Great Britain	Q
4	19	Raffaella Brutto	Italy	
5	22	Bell Berghuis	Netherlands	
6	6	Yuka Fujimori	Japan	

Quarterfinal 4

Rank	Bib	Name	Country	Notes
1	2	Lindsey Jacobellis	United States	Q
2	18	Michela Moioli	Italy	Q
3	7	Belle Brockhoff	Australia	Q
4	10	Sandra Daniela Gerber	Switzerland	
5	15	Torah Bright	Australia	
	23	Helene Olafsen	Norway	DNS

==== Semifinals ====
Semifinal 1

Rank	Bib	Name	Country	Notes
1	1	Eva Samková	Czech Republic	Q
2	13	Chloé Trespeuch	France	Q
3	9	Faye Gulini	United States	Q
4	8	Nelly Moenne Loccoz	France	
	21	Susanne Moll	Austria	DSQ
	20	Simona Meiler	Switzerland	DSQ

Semifinal 2

Rank	Bib	Name	Country	Notes
1	3	Dominique Maltais	Canada	Q
2	11	Aleksandra Zhekova	Bulgaria	Q
3	18	Michela Moioli	Italy	Q
4	14	Zoe Gillings	Great Britain	
5	7	Belle Brockhoff	Australia	
6	2	Lindsey Jacobellis	United States	

==== Finals ====
The finals were started at 13:40.

Small Final

Rank	Bib	Name	Country	Notes
7	2	Lindsey Jacobellis	United States	
8	7	Belle Brockhoff	Australia	
9	14	Zoe Gillings	Great Britain	
10	20	Simona Meiler	Switzerland	
11	8	Nelly Moenne Loccoz	France	
12	21	Susanne Moll	Austria	DNS

Big Final

Rank	Bib	Name	Country	Notes
1st place, gold medalist(s)	1	Eva Samková	Czech Republic	
2nd place, silver medalist(s)	3	Dominique Maltais	Canada	
3rd place, bronze medalist(s)	13	Chloé Trespeuch	France	
4	9	Faye Gulini	United States	
5	11	Aleksandra Zhekova	Bulgaria	
6	21	Michela Moioli	Italy	DNF
