= FIS Freestyle Ski and Snowboarding World Championships 2015 – Women's snowboard cross =

The women's snowboard halfpipe competition of the FIS Freestyle Ski and Snowboarding World Championships 2015 was held at Kreischberg, Austria on January 15 (qualifying) and January 16 (finals). 30 athletes from 14 countries competed.

== Qualification ==
The following are the results of the qualification.

Rank	Bib	Name	Country	Run 1	Rank	Run 2	Rank	Best	Diff	Notes
1	14	Eva Samkova	Czech Republic	1:03.64	1			1:03.64		Q
2	6	Dominique Maltais	Canada	1:03.79	2			1:03.79	+0.15	Q
3	8	Lindsey Jacobellis	United States	1:03.80	3			1:03.80	+0.16	Q
4	4	Alexandra Jekova	Bulgaria	1:04.54	4			1:04.54	+0.90	Q
5	15	Charlotte Bankes	France	1:04.64	5			1:04.64	+1.00	Q
6	11	Nelly Moenne Loccoz	France	1:04.96	6			1:04.96	+1.32	Q
7	12	Belle Brockhoff	Australia	1:05.43	7			1:05.43	+1.79	Q
8	7	Michela Moioli	Italy	1:05.63	8			1:05.63	+1.99	Q
9	10	Faye Gulini	United States	1:06.23	11	1:05.15	1	1:05.15	+1.51	q
10	16	Raffaella Brutto	Italy	1:05.71	9	1:05.39	2	1:05.39	+1.75	q
11	24	Tess Critchlow	Canada	1:06.99	16	1:05.43	3	1:05.43	+1.79	q
12	17	Sandra Daniela Gerber	Switzerland	1:07.05	17	1:05.53	4	1:05.53	+1.89	q
13	18	Maria Ramberger	Austria	1:05.98	10	DNF		1:05.98	+2.34	q
14	13	Yuka Fujimori	Japan	1:06.41	12	1:06.30	5	1:06.30	+2.66	q
15	2	Chloe Trespeuch	France	1:06.63	13	1:06.43	6	1:06.43	+2.79	q
16	23	Carle Brenneman	Canada	1:07.79	21	1:06.52	7	1:06.52	+2.88	q
17	19	Susanne Moll	Austria	1:07.63	19	1:06.70	8	1:06.70	+3.06	
18	27	Kristina Paul	Russia	1:07.74	20	1:06.82	9	1:06.82	+3.18	
19	26	Bell Berghuis	Netherlands	1:06.89	14	1:07.17	14	1:06.89	+3.25	
20	9	Jacqueline Hernandez	United States	1:06.93	15	1:07.03	11	1:06.93	+3.29	
21	22	Sofia Belingheri	Italy	1:07.84	23	1:06.98	10	1:06.98	+3.34	
22	5	Zoe Gillings-Brier	Great Britain	1:07.17	18	1:07.03	11	1:07.03	+3.39	
23	21	Zoe Bergermann	Canada	1:08.69	27	1:07.12	13	1:07.12	+3.48	
24	3	Lorelei Schmitt	France	1:08.12	26	1:07.17	14	1:07.17	+3.53	
25	20	Emilie Aubry	Switzerland	1:07.80	22	1:07.72	16	1:07.72	+4.08	
26	1	Isabel Clark Ribeiro	Brazil	1:07.84	24	1:08.07	17	1:07.84	+4.20	
27	28	Katharina Neussner	Austria	1:07.98	25	1:33.80	20	1:07.98	+4.34	
28	30	Vendula Hopjakova	Czech Republic	1:09.17	28	DNF		1:09.17	+5.53	
29	25	Karen Iwadare	Japan	1:10.20	29	1:09.42	18	1:09.42	+5.78	
30	29	Stephanie Gehrig	Great Britain	1:11.94	30	1:12.17	19	1:11.94	+8.30	

== Elimination round ==
The following are the results of the elimination round.

=== Quarterfinals ===
The top 16 qualifiers advanced to the semifinals. From here, they participated in four-person elimination races, with the top two from each race advancing.

Heat 1

Rank	Bib	Name	Country	Notes
1	1	Eva Samkova	Czech Republic	Q
2	8	Michela Moioli	Italy	Q
3	9	Faye Gulini	United States	
4	16	Carle Brenneman	Canada	

Heat 2

Rank	Bib	Name	Country	Notes
1	4	Alexandra Jekova	Bulgaria	Q
2	5	Charlotte Bankes	France	Q
3	13	Maria Ramberger	Austria	
4	12	Sandra Daniela Gerber	Switzerland	

Heat 3

Rank	Bib	Name	Country	Notes
1	3	Lindsey Jacobellis	United States	Q
2	6	Nelly Moenne Loccoz	France	Q
3	14	Yuka Fujimori	Japan	
4	11	Tess Critchlow	Canada	

Heat 4

Rank	Bib	Name	Country	Notes
1	2	Dominique Maltais	Canada	Q
2	7	Belle Brockhoff	Australia	Q
3	15	Chloe Trespeuch	France	
4	10	Raffaella Brutto	Italy	DNF

=== Semifinals ===
Heat 1

Rank	Bib	Name	Country	Notes
1	4	Alexandra Jekova	Bulgaria	Q
2	8	Michela Moioli	Italy	Q
3	1	Eva Samkova	Czech Republic	
4	5	Charlotte Bankes	France	

Heat 2

Rank	Bib	Name	Country	Notes
1	6	Nelly Moenne Loccoz	France	Q
2	3	Lindsey Jacobellis	United States	Q
3	2	Dominique Maltais	Canada	
4	7	Belle Brockhoff	Australia	

=== Finals ===
==== Small Finals ====
Rank	Bib	Name	Country	Notes
5	2	Dominique Maltais	Canada	
6	1	Eva Samkova	Czech Republic	
7	7	Belle Brockhoff	Australia	
8	5	Charlotte Bankes	France	

==== Big Finals ====
Rank	Bib	Name	Country	Notes
1st place, gold medalist(s)	3	Lindsey Jacobellis	United States	
2nd place, silver medalist(s)	6	Nelly Moenne Loccoz	France	
3rd place, bronze medalist(s)	8	Michela Moioli	Italy	
4	4	Alexandra Jekova	Bulgaria	
