= FIS Snowboarding World Championships 2013 – Women's snowboard cross =

The women's snowboard cross competition of the FIS Snowboarding World Championships 2013 was held at Stoneham-et-Tewkesbury, Québec, Canada between January 24 and 26, 2011.

The qualification round was completed on January 24, while the elimination round was completed on January 26.

== Medalists ==
Gold	Maëlle Ricker; Canada (CAN)
Silver	Dominique Maltais; Canada (CAN)
Bronze	Helene Olafsen; Norway (NOR)

== Results ==
=== Qualification ===
Rank	Bib	Name	Country	Run 1	Rank	Run 2	Rank	Best	Notes
1	31	Maëlle Ricker	Canada	1:09.16	1			1:09.16	Q
2	37	Dominique Maltais	Canada	1:10.38	2			1:10.38	Q
3	29	Eva Samková	Czech Republic	1:10.43	3			1:10.43	Q
4	30	Nelly Moenne Loccoz	France	1:10.90	4			1:10.90	Q
5	34	Helene Olafsen	Norway	1:12.40	5			1:12.40	Q
6	42	Michela Moioli	Italy	1:12.54	6			1:12.54	Q
7	27	Déborah Anthonioz	France	1:12.99	7			1:12.99	Q
8	40	Zoe Gillings	Great Britain	1:13.34	8			1:13.34	Q
9	28	Aleksandra Zhekova	Bulgaria	1:14.00	9			1:14.00	Q
10	48	Sandra Daniela Gerber	Switzerland	1:14.10	10			1:14.10	Q
11	25	Belle Brockhoff	Australia	1:14.89	11			1:14.89	Q
12	39	Maria Ramberger	Austria	1:15.06	12			1:15.06	Q
13	32	Raffaella Brutto	Italy	DNF		1:12.54	1	1:12.54	q
14	35	Chloe Trespeuch	France	1:24.26	18	1:15.20	2	1:15.20	q
15	38	Faye Gulini	United States	1:16.31	14	1:15.26	3	1:15.26	q
16	47	Carle Brenneman	Canada	1:15.65	13	DNF		1:15.65	q
17	49	Isabel Clark Ribeiro	Brazil	1:50.98	23	1:16.14	4	1:16.14	q
18	43	Susanne Moll	Austria	DNF		1:16.56	5	1:16.56	q
19	36	Emilie Aubry	Switzerland	1:17.08	15	1:41.12	12	1:17.08	q
20	33	Yuka Fujimori	Japan	1:17.74	16	1:17.76	6	1:17.74	q
21	50	Jade Critchlow	Canada	1:29.14	20	1:17.78	7	1:17.78	q
22	54	Irina Kovaleva	Russia	1:23.69	17	2:02.88	13	1:23.69	q
23	46	Bell Berghuis	Netherlands	DNF		1:26.53	8	1:26.53	q
24	52	Olga Chebotareva	Russia	1:28.02	19	1:27.57	9	1:27.57	q
25	26	Simona Meiler	Switzerland	1:35.86	22	1:29.95	10	1:29.95	
26	53	Klára Koukalová	Czech Republic	2:04.59	25	1:31.15	11	1:31.15	
27	55	Zuzanna Smykala	Poland	1:33.44	21	DNF		1:33.44	
28	51	Jenna Feldman	United States	1:56.09	24	DNF		1:56.09	
	41	Claire Chapotot	France	DNF		DNS			
	58	Courtney Phillipson	Australia	DNS		DNS			
	57	Modesta Juste Morauskaite	Lithuania	DNS		DNS			
	56	Katerina Chourova	Czech Republic	DNS		DNS			
	45	Ana Amor	Spain	DNS		DNS			
	44	Anastasia Asanova	Russia	DNS		DNS			

== Elimination round ==
=== Quarterfinals ===
The top 24 qualifiers advanced to the Quarterfinals. From here, they participated in six-person elimination races, with the top three from each race advancing.

Heat 1

Rank	Bib	Name	Country	Notes
1	1	Maëlle Ricker	Canada	Q
2	24	Olga Chebotareva	Russia	Q
3	8	Zoe Gillings	Great Britain	Q
4	17	Isabel Clark Ribeiro	Brazil	
5	9	Aleksandra Zhekova	Bulgaria	DSQ
6	16	Carle Brenneman	Canada	DNS

Heat 2

Rank	Bib	Name	Country	Notes
1	5	Helene Olafsen	Norway	Q
2	12	Maria Ramberger	Austria	Q
3	13	Raffaella Brutto	Italy	Q
4	20	Yuka Fujimori	Japan	
5	4	Nelly Moenne Loccoz	France	
6	21	Jade Critchlow	Canada	

Heat 3

Rank	Bib	Name	Country	Notes
1	3	Eva Samková	Czech Republic	Q
2	6	Michela Moioli	Italy	Q
3	14	Chloe Trespeuch	France	Q
4	11	Belle Brockhoff	Australia	
5	19	Emilie Aubry	Switzerland	
6	22	Irina Kovaleva	Russia	

Heat 4

Rank	Bib	Name	Country	Notes
1	2	Dominique Maltais	Canada	Q
2	7	Déborah Anthonioz	France	Q
3	18	Susanne Moll	Austria	Q
4	15	Faye Gulini	United States	
5	10	Sandra Daniela Gerber	Switzerland	
6	23	Bell Berghuis	Netherlands	DSQ

=== Semifinals ===
Heat 1

Rank	Bib	Name	Country	Notes
1	1	Maëlle Ricker	Canada	Q
2	5	Helene Olafsen	Norway	Q
3	13	Raffaella Brutto	Italy	Q
4	8	Zoe Gillings	Great Britain	
5	12	Maria Ramberger	Austria	
6	24	Olga Chebotareva	Russia	

Heat 2

Rank	Bib	Name	Country	Notes
1	2	Dominique Maltais	Canada	Q
2	14	Chloe Trespeuch	France	Q
3	6	Michela Moioli	Italy	Q
4	7	Déborah Anthonioz	France	
5	18	Susanne Moll	Austria	
6	3	Eva Samková	Czech Republic	

=== Finals ===
==== Small Finals ====
Rank	Bib	Name	Country	Notes
7	3	Eva Samková	Czech Republic	
8	12	Maria Ramberger	Austria	
9	18	Susanne Moll	Austria	
10	8	Zoe Gillings	Great Britain	
11	7	Déborah Anthonioz	France	
12	24	Olga Chebotareva	Russia	

==== Big Finals ====
Rank	Bib	Name	Country	Notes
1st place, gold medalist(s)	1	Maëlle Ricker	Canada	
2nd place, silver medalist(s)	2	Dominique Maltais	Canada	
3rd place, bronze medalist(s)	5	Helene Olafsen	Norway	
4	14	Chloe Trespeuch	France	
5	6	Michela Moioli	Italy	
6	13	Raffaella Brutto	Italy	
