= Ivan Bussens =

British water polo player (1960–2007)

Personal information
- Born: 3 June 1960 Batu Gaja, Malaysia
- Died: 27 August 2007 (aged 47)

Sport
- Sport: Water polo

Ivan Bussens (3 June 1960 – 27 August 2007) was a British sportsman who competed at water polo at the Gay Games. He raised the profile of LGBT sport, having co-founded the Out for Sport organisation representing LGBTQ+ clubs in London and served on international sporting associations.

== Biography ==
Bussens was born at Batu Gaja, Malaysia, and educated at Culford School, Suffolk, England. Having moved to London, he became a fashion buyer, events planner and interior designer. The latter brought prominence with photographers and television companies, and the house he shared with his partner Peter Unsworth featured in magazines and in scenes from ITV's Footballers Wives.

Bussens founded Out for Sport, an organisation representing gay sports clubs in London. He promoted its first multi-sport competition. Bussens served on the board of the International Gay and Lesbian Aquatics Association and was London representative at the Federation of Gay Games. He persuaded the committee of Out To Swim to sponsor a women-only session to encourage greater participation. In 2000 he helped Out To Swim establish a water polo team (known as London Orca) with the help of a National Lottery grant. He made links with the 2012 Summer Olympics and the Mayor of London's office to ensure lesbian and gay inclusion.

Bussens was in a same-sex partnership with Peter Unsworth for 26 years. After having cancer in 2006, Bussens suffered a relapse and died in hospital in summer 2007, aged 47. His funeral took place in Norfolk, where his parents Alan and Cyndie lived, and where he is buried.

== See also ==
- Homosexuality in sports
- Principle 6 campaign
