= Igla =

Igla may refer to:

- 9K38 Igla, a man-portable surface-to-air missile (SAM)
- Igla (spacecraft docking system), Soyuz's orbital automatic docking radio telemetry
- Bella Igla (born 1985), Israeli female chess player
- Jonathan Igla, writer and producer
- International Gay and Lesbian Aquatics Association, the international governing body for gay and lesbian aquatics clubs
- The Needle (1988 film) (Igla), 1989 Soviet film directed by Rashid Nugmanov
