= LGBTQ rights protests surrounding the 2014 Winter Olympics =

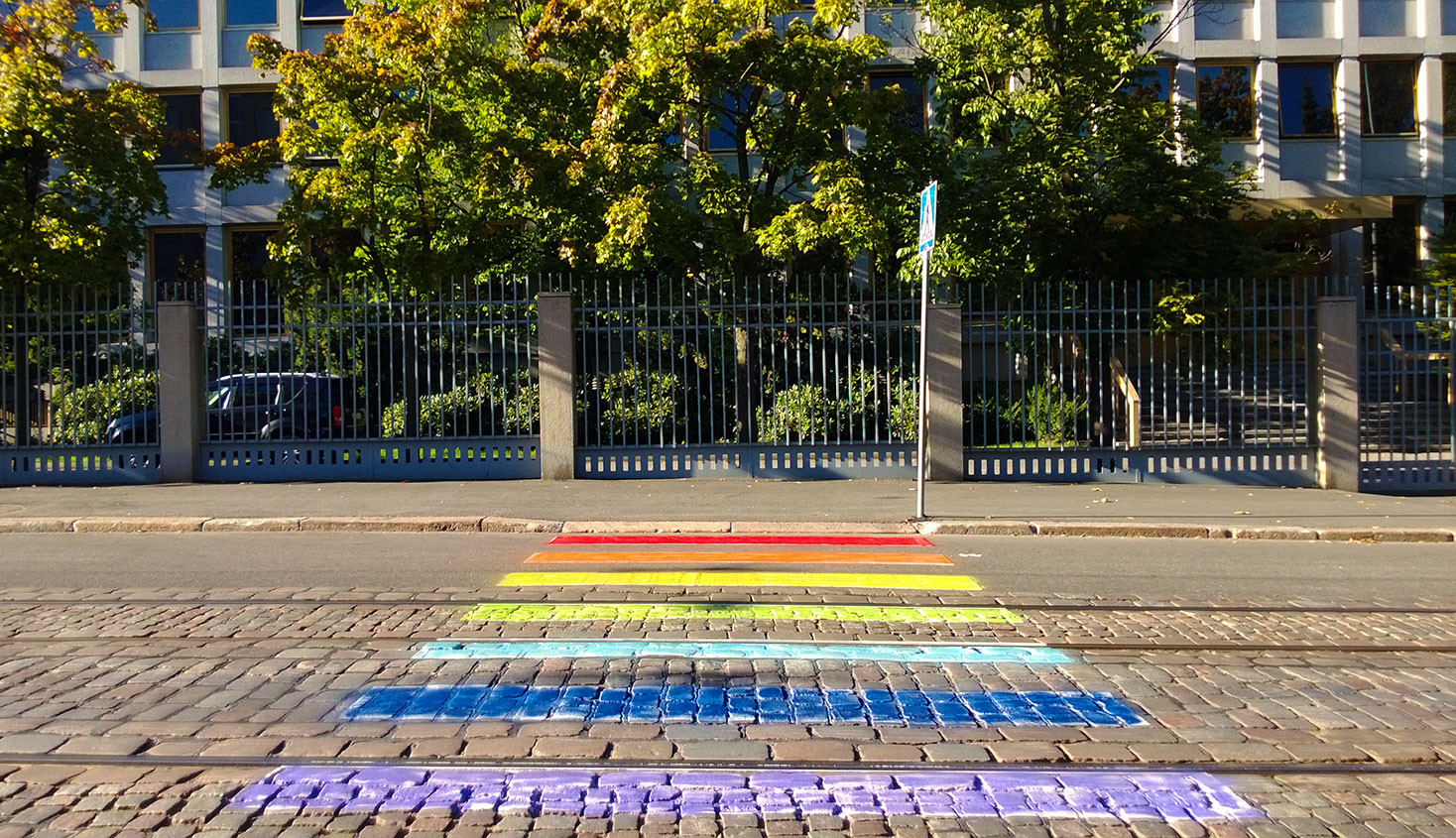
From August to September 2013, activists painted pedestrian crossings outside the Russian embassies in Stockholm, Oslo and Helsinki in rainbow colours in protest at the new law.

During the lead-up to the 2014 Winter Olympics, protests and campaigns arose surrounding the rights of lesbian, gay, bisexual, and transgender (LGBT) people in Russia.

Concerns for LGBT athletes and supporters during the Games began as early as March 2012, when a Russian judge blocked the establishment of a Pride House in Sochi, ruling that "propaganda of non-traditional sexual relationships" would "undermine the security of Russian society", and that it conflicted with public morality and the country's policies "in the area of family motherhood and childhood protection."

The majority of protests, however, centred on the passing of a law in June 2013, which banned the distribution of "propaganda of non-traditional sexual relationships" among minors and it was argued that the law was broad enough so that it would ban any public display of LGBTQ+ symbols and suppress LGBTQ+ culture in Russia. The law itself was also considered to have caused an increase in homophobic violence, and an increase in the arrest of pro-LGBT protesters.

The implications of the law on the then-upcoming Winter Olympics were a major concern among athletes and the Western media, as the Olympic Charter contains language explicitly denouncing all forms of discrimination. Early international pressure was leveraged to compel the International Olympic Committee (IOC) to move the Olympics to another country, as well as pressure on Olympic sponsors to take a stand for LGBT equality. In tandem, calls to boycott and protest the Olympics before, during, and after the games also went out from various organizations and groups, and a number of Olympic athletes came out as a symbolic protest of the law. Prior to the Games, similar pressure was placed on major Olympic sponsors, and several non-sponsors also made public statements in support of LGBT rights. Several national politicians declined to attend the Games, which some Western media outlets attributed as connected to the legislation, while others stated that few leaders normally attend the Winter Games as it is not a "must attend" event.

== Timeline of protests and related events ==
=== 2013 ===
- (June 2013) Russia passed a law with near unanimous support by Russian lawmakers, and signed by President Vladimir Putin, banning the "propaganda of nontraditional sexual relations", and "imposes fines for providing information about the gay community to minors."
- (29 June 2013) Dozens of gay activists were beaten and arrested at a gay rights rally in St. Petersburg citing the new law.
- (July 2013) A multifaceted campaign is launched to raise awareness about the gay rights situation in Russia, and stem future Olympic bids going to countries who violate human rights.
- (July 23, 2013) The first arrests of foreign citizens under the ban against gay propaganda took place in Murmansk, when four Dutch citizens, attending a human rights seminar, were also filming a documentary on gay life in Russia.
- (9 August to 6 September) In August and September 2013 the Russian embassies in Stockholm, Oslo and Helsinki all had Rainbow crossings painted on the road outside of the embassy buildings in response to the new law. In Helsinki the activists returned the night after they had painted the zebra crossing and staged a kiss-in in front of the Russian embassy. In Stockholm the activists returned to the rainbow crossing and walked naked across it whilst they were having their photo taken by other activists and they also stood outside the embassy wearing only underwear and dressed up in drag. One of these activists in Stockholm who was wearing only a tight fitting pair of shiny blue underwear also pole danced upside down on a street sign pole outside of the embassy.
- (14 August 2013) U.S. runner Nick Symmonds became "the first international athlete to denounce Russia's law against "gay propaganda" on the country's soil." He had just won the silver medal in the 800 m race in Moscow, and dedicated the medal to his gay and lesbian friends and called for LGBT equality.
- (26 August 2013) Australian snowboarder Belle Brockhoff came out as gay to bring attention to Russia's LGBT propaganda law, and for lesbian and gay athletes. Brockhoff also commented that "It's the perfect opportunity to send a message. The Australian Olympic Committee has been really supportive and they want me to be safe. They don't recommend me waving a [rainbow] flag around which I won't do. The most I'll do is hold up six fingers to represent Principle Six. Possibly I'll do it on camera here or there, and maybe after the heats of my event... ...After I compete, I'm willing to rip on his ass."
- (29 August 2013) Human Rights Campaign sent letters to the ten Worldwide sponsors of the International Olympic Committee, Dow Chemical, Coca-Cola, General Electric, McDonald's, Procter & Gamble, Panasonic, Samsung, Omega, Visa Inc., and Atos, to take steps to stem violence against LGBT people including a clear and unequivocal public position in opposition to anti-LGBT laws, denouncing violence targeted against LGBT people and demanding accountability, asking the IOC to obtain written commitments for the safety of LGBT athletes and attendees, and rejecting future Olympic bids from countries that outlaw support for LGBT equality.
- (5 September 2013) Canadian Olympic speed skater Anastasia Bucsis publicly came out as gay "in response to Russia's anti-gay laws".
- (25 September 2013) Two gay rights activists were detained by police officers outside the Sochi Organizing Committee office in downtown Moscow. They had been holding a poster, "Homophobia is Russia's Disgrace" during a protest.
- (6 October 2013) In October 2013 2,000 people filled Stockholm's Olympic Stadium and then sung the national anthem of Russia whilst waving Rainbow flags as well as placing large Rainbow flags along the top of the wall that runs around the back of the seating at the top of the stadium. The performance was later uploaded to youtube.
- (15 December 2013) French President François Hollande first kissed a male citizen (openly against Russian laws) then joined German President Joachim Gauck and EU Commissioner Viviane Reding in boycotting the Sochi Olympics in protest of the law.
- (20 December 2013) The U.S. official delegation, in a surprise announcement, would not include any members of President Barack Obama's family, or an active Cabinet secretary, the first time in at least twenty years. The delegation instead would be composed of openly gay athletes, "a clear jab at Russia's recent anti-gay laws."
- (29 December 2013) Olympic gold medalist Brian Boitano came out as gay publicly; he had been named as part of the American Olympic delegation by President Barack Obama. The actions were widely seen as a response to the anti-gay laws enacted.

=== 2014 (pre-Games) ===
- (10 January 2014) The U.S. State Department issued warnings for Americans traveling to the Olympics. Specifically for LGBT people it noted that "Russia has in place a law that bans the 'propaganda of nontraditional sexual relations' to minors. It said authorities have been vague about defining 'propaganda' and that the law applies to foreigners. A conviction on the charge could result in a fine, a jail term and deportation."
- (16 January 2014, or before) The annual "Orthodox Calendar" is released, featuring drawings of naked men, with some proceeds used to combat anti-LGBT laws in Russia. The calendar was created to criticize homophobic views in Eastern Orthodox communities and the former Soviet Union.
- (17 January 2014) Russian president Vladimir Putin, in a meeting with Olympic volunteers explained that their rainbow-colored uniforms were not considered violating the Kremlin's anti-LGBT initiatives because "We do not have a ban on non-traditional sexual relationships ... We have a ban on the propaganda of homosexuality and paedophilia." The rainbow flag and colors are an international symbol for LGBTQ communities. Conflating homosexuality with pedophilia has been a common practice in the opposition to the gay rights movement. In its Winter 2010 Intelligence Report the Southern Poverty Law Center noted that since the 1980s there has been organized efforts by "hard-line elements of the religious right searching for ways to demonize gay people — or, at a minimum, to find arguments that will prevent their normalization in society." These groups utilize anti-gay myths to "form the basis of its claim that homosexuality is a social evil that must be suppressed — an opinion rejected by virtually all relevant medical and scientific authorities." The SPLC notes these anti-gay myths "almost certainly contribute to hate crime violence directed at the LGBT community, which is more targeted for such attacks than any other minority group in America."
- (18 January 2014) A gay Russian protestor, Pavel Lebedev, was tackled and detained for unfurling a rainbow flag during the Olympic torch relay as it passed through his hometown of Voronezh, 506 miles north of Sochi. (See 23 January.)
- (23 January 2014) Olympics sponsor McDonald's launched a social media campaign #CheerstoSochi to offer well wishes to Olympians. The hashtag was quickly hijacked by activists who instead used it to post protest images and messages of support for Pavel Lebedev, who was tackled and detained in his hometown on 18 January for holding a rainbow flag while the Olympic torch went by.
- (28 January 2014) Olympic sponsor Coca-Cola was forced to shut down an interactive feature that allowed users to put messages on Coke cans supporting the Olympic athletes. LGBT activists hijacked the campaign, "urging people around the globe to use the cans to highlight messages about Russian anti-gay brutality."
- (29 January 2014) Head of the Sochi Organizing Committee, Dmitry Chernyshenko, expressed clarifications of athletes making political statements during their news conferences at the Games. Contradicting IOC president Thomas Bach, who said athletes could make political statements during their media interviews, Chernyshenko said a free speech zone would be available for speaking about politics ten miles away from Olympic venues. (Note: Three protest parks were designated in Beijing during the 2008 Summer Olympics, at the suggestion of the IOC. All 77 applications to protest there had been withdrawn or denied, and no protests took place. Four persons who applied to protest were arrested or sentenced to reeducation.(Elderly Chinese Women Sentenced to Labor Re-education, The Washington Post, August 20, 2008; Peter Foster, The IOC plays appeaser in Beijing, Telegraph Blogs, August 20, 2008.))
- (29 January 2014) In an interview with the BBC, British Culture Secretary Maria Miller said the UK government would provide extra funding for gay rights campaigners in Russia, in conjunction with the Olympic Games opportunity.
- (29 January 2014) LGBT media-watchdog group GLAAD (Gay and Lesbian Alliance Against Defamation) launched a resource guide for journalists covering the 2014 Olympics, as well as Global Voices program, "sharing culture-changing stories of LGBT people and families in national and international media."
- (30 January 2014) The Principle 6 campaign, "named after the clause in the Olympic charter that supposedly guarantees non-discrimination", was launched with over 50 current and former Olympians protesting Russia's anti-LGBT policies. The campaign criticized Games officials and sponsors for lack of action, and called on Russian authorities to reconsider the laws that led to "a wave of homophobic attacks." In relation to principle 6 the Australian snowboarder Belle Brockhoff commented before the games that "The Australian Olympic Committee has been really supportive and they want me to be safe. They don't recommend me waving a [rainbow] flag around which I won't do. The most I'll do is hold up six fingers to represent Principle Six. Possibly I'll do it on camera here or there, and maybe after the heats of my event... ...After I compete, I'm willing to rip on his ass,".
- (31 January 2014) A new campaign called "Anything But Coke" was launched protesting Coca-Cola's "refusal to denounce these human rights abuses" regarding Russia's crackdown. Actions were slated for college and high school campuses in the U.S.
- (31 January 2014) In Stockholm, Sweden, 2000 people gathered to produce a video as part of a "Live and Let Love" campaign, showing support for Russian LGBT people.
- (31 January 2014) An open letter to the ten world sponsors of the Olympics "urging them to denounce the law and run ads promoting equality for lesbians, gays, bisexuals and transgender people" was signed by 40 human rights and gay rights groups including Amnesty International, Human Rights Watch, and the Human Rights Campaign.
- (1 February 2014) Activists from various non-governmental groups protested in Paris by forming the five Olympic ring symbol with people and large images of violence against lesbian and gay people.
- (2 February 2014) Finnish Olympic swimmer Ari-Pekka Liukkonen came out publicly as gay to "raise awareness about Russia's anti-gay laws ahead of the Sochi Games." Liukkonen was the first Finnish athlete to come out of the closet while still active in his sport. He competed at the 2012 London Olympics and has won bronze at the European Championships.
- (4 February 2014) A Russian ninth-grade girl from the Bryansk region was punished for violating the gay propaganda law after she openly announced her "nontraditional sexual orientation." It was the first case against a Russian minor under the controversial law, and the incident will appear on her criminal record.
- (4 February 2014) The Canadian Institute of Diversity and Inclusion released a humorous, two-man luge-themed public service announcement in support of LGBT rights, with the tagline "The Games have always been a little gay. Let's fight to keep them that way." Michael Bach, head of the Institute, stated that it was intended to make "a really strong message about the need for equality and the treatment of LGBT people and their allies, particularly at the Olympics"
- (4 February 2014) AT&T, a sponsor of the United States Olympic Committee, became the first major U.S. corporation to publicly condemn Russia's LGBT propaganda law and show a pro-LGBT stance. The Human Rights Campaign had called on major corporations including the worldwide Olympic sponsors to condemn the laws.
- (4 February 2014) Norway's openly gay health minister Bent Høie announced he would attend the 2014 Winter Paralympics with his husband. It is common for cabinet officials to travel with their spouses.
- (4 February 2014) Svetlana Zhurova, a former Olympic champion and mayor of the Olympic Village for the Mountain cluster, called for no protests during the Games, stating that "We are all participants of the Games and we are going to applaud the straight people and the homosexuals just like the previous Olympic Games." She had recently appeared on Russian television defending the ban on gay propaganda.
- (4 February 2014) LGBT ally, National Football League's Chris Kluwe, encouraged Sochi Olympians to speak up about "abuse against LGBTQ people in Russia", in London's The Guardian.
- (6 February 2014) The Russia Freedom Fund, Athlete Ally, and CoPilot partnered with the Fair Games Project, producing a PSA protesting Russia treatment of LGBT people, and highlighting similar abuses in other countries.
- (6 February 2014) Two USOC sponsors, the Chobani yogurt company and DeVry University, publicly stated opposition to the LGBT propaganda law and support for efforts for LGBT equality. Chobani's CEO stated, "We oppose Russia's anti-LGBT law", in an interview on CNBC.

=== 2014 (during the Games) ===
- (4 February 2014) A number of major Canadian cities, including Calgary, Edmonton, Halifax, Quebec City, St. John's, and Toronto, began to fly rainbow flags on government buildings in recognition of the rights of LGBT people in Russia. By the end of the games, the campaign has been joined by at least 33 cities and the provincial legislatures of eight of Canada's ten provinces.
- (6 February 2014) Google changed its front page logo to a rainbow-coloured Google Doodle with pictograms of sports linking to a search for "Olympic Charter", and placed a quote from the charter on the page as well. The doodle was characterized in media as a symbolic protest, although Google specifically refused to acknowledge it.
- (7 February 2014) Just ahead of the opening ceremony, four LGBT activists, including Anastasia Smirnova, Aleksandra Semenova and a pregnant woman, were arrested in St. Petersburg for holding up a banner reading "Discrimination is incompatible with the Olympic movement. Principle 6. Olympic charter."
- (7 February 2014) U.S. President Barack Obama confirmed in an interview with NBC Sports' Bob Costas that the inclusion of gay athletes in the U.S. Olympic delegation was to send a pointed message in response to the Russian laws, saying that "there is no doubt we wanted to make it very clear that we do not abide by discrimination in anything, including discrimination on the basis of sexual orientation. One of the wonderful things about the Olympics is that you are judged by your merit, how good you are regardless of where you come from, what you look like, who you love and that I think is consistent with the spirit of the Olympics."
- (7 February 2014) The Huffington Post noted that the opening ceremony, ironically given Russia's LGBT stance and the associated protest movement, featured tributes to "some of history's most widely acclaimed and definitely gay Russians", including composer Peter Tchaikovsky (1840–1893); Ukrainian-born Russian humorist, dramatist, and novelist Nikolai Gogol (1809–1852); filmmaker Sergei Eisenstein (1898–1948); ballet dancer Vaslav Nijinsky (1889–1950); and patron of arts and founder of Ballets Russes, Sergei Diaghilev. The organizers claimed that these individuals were selected due to their "merits" and "contributions to Russian culture", denying any relation to LGBT rights. On the same topic, critics also noted that the Russian pop duo t.A.T.u were invited to perform during the opening ceremony. Although they are not actually lesbian, the all-female duo were well known for incorporating themes of lesbianism in their music and on-stage personas (live appearances often featured the singers kissing each other), their name is a corruption of a shortened Russian phrase meaning "this girl loves that girl", and the duo made a statement in support of LGBT rights in the wake of Yuri Luzhkov's objection to the 2007 Moscow Pride parade. Organizers noted that t.A.T.u were chosen because they were well known to an international audience, denying any relation to the LGBT movement.
- (7 February 2014) During the opening ceremony IOC president Thomas Bach made a speech which made strong statements against discrimination:
  Yes, Yes, it is possible – even as competitors – to live together under one roof in harmony, with tolerance and without any form of discrimination for whatever reason.
- (7 February 2014) Cheryl Maas, one of six reportedly outed competitors in the Games, made the first display of LGBT "propaganda" in solidarity with Russian LGBT persons. Following her attempt to qualify in the slopestyle event at Sochi, Cheryl Maas, from the Netherlands, who is openly married to another woman, raised her glove bearing a rainbow (and a unicorn) to the cameras. The snowboarder has reportedly previously criticized the decision to hold the Games in Sochi, stating, "With the choice of Russia, the IOC is taking a step back in time."
- (10 February 2014) On ESPN's Outside the Lines, 24-year-old Callan Chythlook-Sifsof, an Olympic snowboarder, said she wanted to come out at Sochi to make a statement about LGBT rights in light of Russia's law, but she missed the cut for Team USA.
- (13 February 2014) A group of friends from Amsterdam, the Netherlands, released "Putin Gay Dress Up", an online game to protest against Putin's statements about gay rights. Players had to dress up the president as a stereotyped gay, including woman's clothes and a Pussy Riot T-shirt.

== See also ==
- Concerns and controversies at the 2014 Winter Olympics
- James Kirchick
- List of LGBTQ sportspeople
- Hunted: The War Against Gays in Russia
- Human rights in Russia
- LGBTQ rights in Russia
- LGBTQ rights in Asia
- LGBTQ rights in Europe
- LGBTQ history in Russia
- Principle 6 campaign
- Mayer Brown
- Uprising of Love
