= Out for Sport =

Out For Sport is a non-profit organisation representing LGBTQ+ grassroots sports clubs, based in London.

== History ==
Founded in 1999 and incorporated in 2013, it is a federation of LGBTQ+ sports clubs in the UK which aims to increase participation of the LGBTQ+ community in sports. It also sits as London's representative organisation within the Federation of Gay Games as a full member, giving it two votes on matters such as elections to its board, where the Gay Games is held and other initiatives the Federation is involved in around the world. Part of Out For Sport's role as a member of the Federation of Gay Games is to raise awareness of the Gay Games and encourage participation in the Games. One of the founding members of Out For Sport was Ivan Bussens, a member of the Out To Swim aquatics club.

== Organisation ==
Out For Sport is the UK's only LGBTQ+ sports organisation run by and for sports clubs. It has affiliated clubs in swimming, running, rowing, squash, hockey, tennis, rugby, football, sailing, jujitsu, golf, basketball, and roller derby.

== Membership ==
The group's members are appointed by its affiliated clubs. Affiliated clubs can appoint up to two members to the General Assembly, which is responsible for the election of Out For Sport's Committee and which meets throughout the year to steer the Committee and hold it to account.

== Management Committee ==
The Committee of Out For Sport consists of a Chair, Treasurer, Club Liaison and Secretary along with two delegates to the Federation of Gay Games. The Committee is responsible for the day-to-day running of the organisation and is usually in the process of organising the next big social event or sports events throughout the year. The Committee usually meets every month.

== See also ==
- Athlete Ally
