= Principle 6 campaign =

Olympic protest of Russia's anti-gay laws

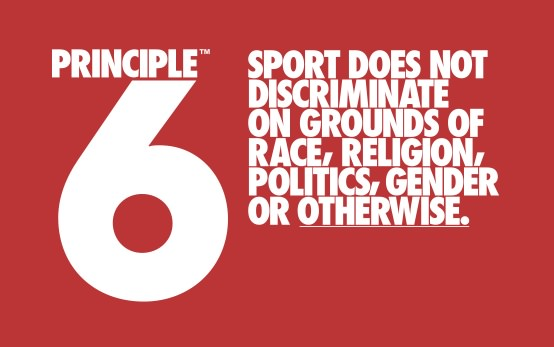

The Principle Six campaign, also Principle 6, or P6, was launched in January 2014 as an Olympic protests of Russian anti-gay laws in conjunction with the 2014 Winter Olympics being held in Sochi, Russia. Principle 6 refers to the sixth principle of the Olympic Charter that says any form of discrimination "is incompatible with belonging to the Olympic Movement."

Any form of discrimination with regard to a country or a person on grounds of race, religion, politics, gender or otherwise is incompatible with belonging to the Olympic Movement.

Human rights campaigner Peter Tatchell noted that openly gay and lesbian athletes are actively discriminated against in Russia as well as dozens of countries that criminalize same-sex relationships, or gay people generally on an institutional level. "These are clear breaches of the anti-discrimination Principle Six of the Olympic Charter. Yet the International Olympic Committee has said and done nothing. It is allowing the Russian government to ban the Pride House and discriminate against lesbian, gay, bisexual, and transgender (LGBT) athletes and spectators."

The Principle Six campaign was put together by All Out, a social media organizing advocacy group with 1.9 million members come from every country in the world, and Athlete Ally, an organization working to end homophobia and transphobia in sports by reaching out to athletic communities. American Apparel partnered with the two groups to produce and distribute Principle 6 gear online and in their stores globally

== Background ==
Olympic protests of Russian anti-gay laws arose in the months leading up to the 2014 Winter Olympics in Sochi, Russia. Scheduled to take place from 6 to 23 February 2014, the Olympic Games is a major international multi-sport event that occurs once every four years. Up to that time that atmosphere in future and politics for lesbian, gay, bisexual, and transgender (LGBT) people has been generally improving. In 2013 Russia received criticism from around the world and across the international community for enacting a law that bans the distribution of "propaganda of non-traditional sexual relations" to minors. Since the passage of the anti-gay propaganda law, the media has reported the arrest of a gay rights activist as well as a surging incidence of hate crimes motivated by homophobia, including hate crimes perpetrated by neo-Nazi groups against gay minors. A law prohibiting gay pride parades in Moscow for one-hundred years has also recently been enacted.

International pressure was leveraged to compel the International Olympic Committee (IOC) to move the Olympics to another country, as well as pressure on Olympic sponsors to take a stand for LGBT equality. In tandem, calls to boycott and protest the Olympics before, during, and after the games, also went out, with various organizations and groups organizing efforts. In addition several politicians, including U.S. President Barack Obama, and members of his administration, and other world leaders have publicly stated they would not attend, and these actions have been tied to the protest efforts. In the U.S., the Olympic delegation is made up of several LGBT Olympians, and athletes including Brian Boitano and Martina Navratilova.

In response to protest and boycott efforts, corporations and the IOC have made steps to guarantee the safety of their employees, athletes, and staff, who are in Russia in advance or during the Olympics.

== On-site ambassadors in Sochi, Russia ==
Athletes expected to attend and compete at the Sochi Winter Olympic Games

- Australian snowboarder Belle Brockhoff
- Australian bobsled team captain Heath Spence
- Canadian alpine skier Mike Janyk
- Canadian snowboarder Alex Duckworth

== Olympic athlete co-signers ==
- four-time Olympic gold medal diver Greg Louganis
- four-time Olympic luger and International Sports Law expert Cameron Myler
- two-time Olympic middle-distance runner Nick Symmonds
- Australian tennis player and four-time Olympian Rennae Stubbs
- ParaPan Am gold medalist archer Lee Ford
- figure skater Mark Janoschak
- gold medalist and soccer player Megan Rapinoe
- gold medalist and soccer player Lori Lindsey
- soccer player Hedvig Lindahl
- soccer player Sally Shipard
- soccer player Robbie Rogers
- soccer player Chris Seitz
- two-time gold medalist rower Caryn Davies
- Irish Olympic runner Ciarán Ó Lionáird
- former Soviet archer Khatuna Lorig
- U.S. basketball star Teresa Edwards
- U.S. swimmer Dan Veatch
- U.S. Paralympian Tanner Gers
- Paralympic bronze medalist Lindsey Carmichael
- wrestler Ben Provisor
- Ice Hockey player Caitlin Cahow
- tennis star Martina Navratilova
- tennis star Andy Roddick
- tennis star Mardy Fish
- Australian bobsledder Jana Pittman
- tennis star James Blake
- rower Esther Lofgren
- Paralympic Australian basketball player Sarah Stewart
- Australian Olympic trampoline silver medalist Ji Wallace
- Swiss snowboarder Simona Meiler
- American fencer Race Imboden
- U.S. diver David Pichler
- U.S. snowboarder Callan Chythlook-Sifsof
- U.S. snowboarder Seth Wescott
- Canadian speed skater Anastasia Bucsis
- German bronze medal fencer Joerg Fiedler
- U.S. Paralympic tennis player Sharon Kelleher
- U.S. speed skater and silver medalist Miriam Rothstein
- German silver medal fencer Imke Duplitzer
- U.S. beach volleyball player Jen Kessey
- Canadian biathlete Rosanna Crawford

== Professional athlete co-signers ==
- NFL star Chris Kluwe
- NFL star Brendon Ayanbadejo
- NFL star Scott Fujita
- NFL star Donté Stallworth
- Tennis star Martina Navratilova
- Tennis star Andy Roddick
- Tennis star James Blake
- Tennis star Mardy Fish
- MLS player Stephen McCarthy
- MLS player Robbie Rogers
- NBA player Steve Nash
- NBA player Jason Collins
- WNBA player Teresa Edwards
- WNBA player Kristi Toliver
- Rugby player David Pocock
- Race car driver Leilani Munter
- Australian national soccer team player Michelle Heyman
- Australian national soccer team player Lydia Williams
- Endurance swimmer Diana Nyad
