= Helene Olafsen =

Norwegian former snowboarder

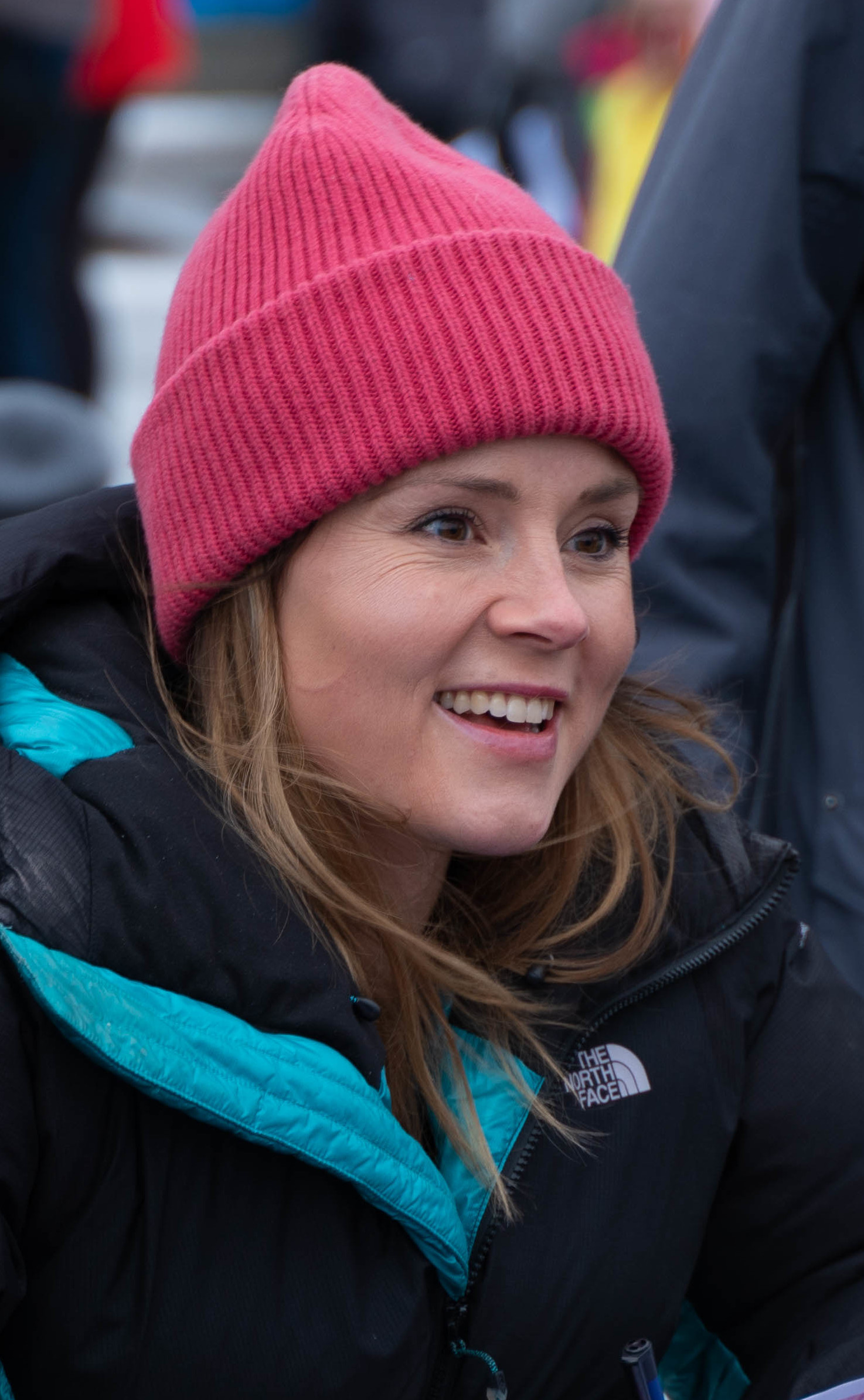

Personal information
- Full name: Helene Hokholt Olafsen
- Born: 21 February 1990 (age 36) Oslo, Norway
- Height: 168 cm (5 ft 6 in) (2014)

Sport
- Country: Norway
- Sport: Snowboard cross
Medal record
Women's snowboarding
Representing Norway
World Championships
Gold medal – first place	2009 Gangwon	Snowboard Cross
Bronze medal – third place	2007 Arosa	Snowboard Cross
Bronze medal – third place	2013 Stoneham	Snowboard Cross
Winter X Games
Silver medal – second place	2009 Aspen	Snowboard Cross
Silver medal – second place	2010 Aspen	Snowboard Cross
Bronze medal – third place	2014 Aspen	Snowboard Cross

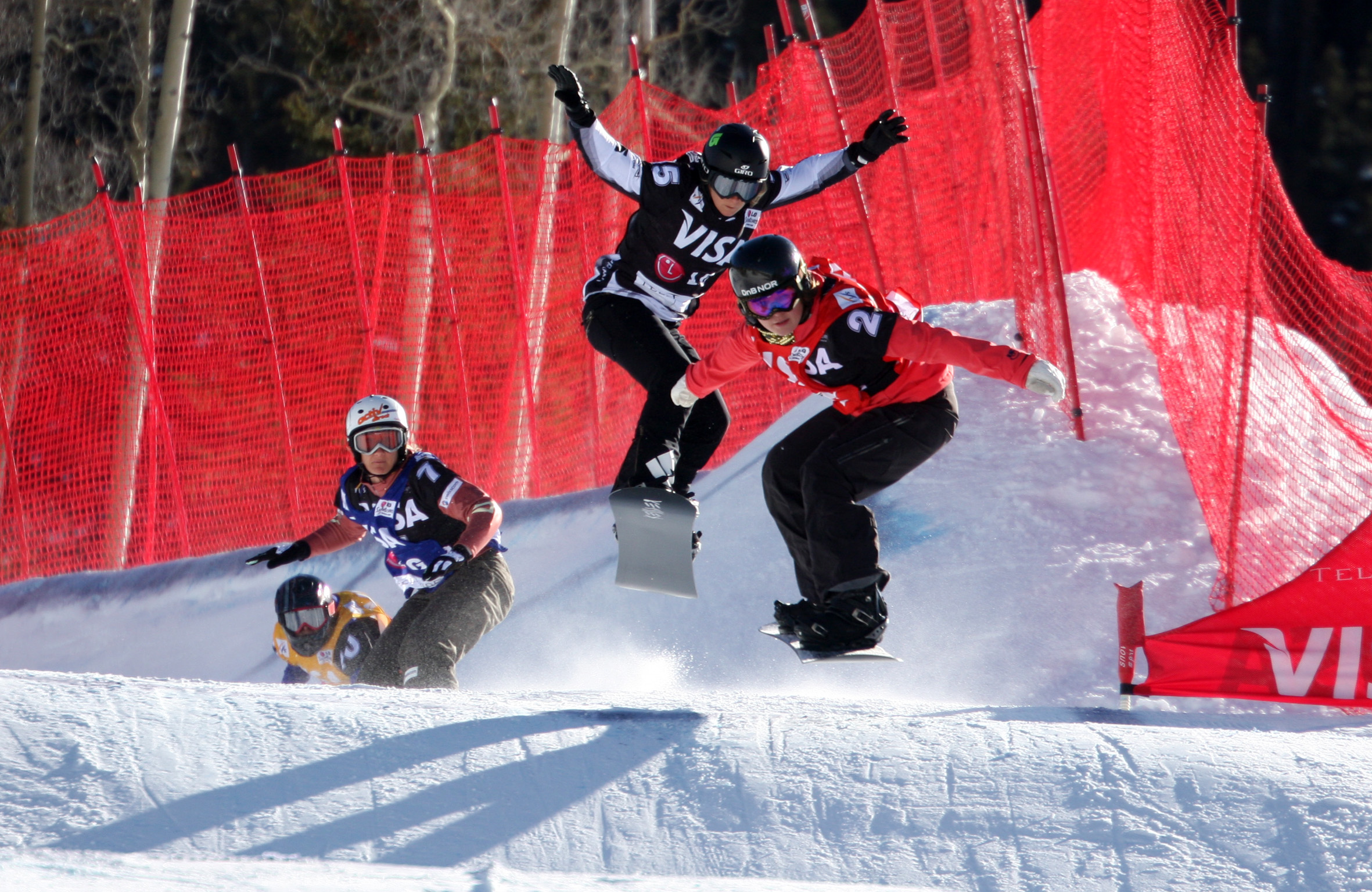
Helene Olafsen (leading), Alexandra Jekova, Tanja Frieden, Nelly Moenne Loccoz. Telluride, 19 December 2009, Quarter Final

Helene Hokholt Olafsen (born 21 February 1990) is a Norwegian television presenter and former snowboarder.

She placed tenth overall in the 2007-08 Snowboarding World Cup, and fifth in her special event boardercross, where she collected 3570 of her total 4160 points. She took her first victory in a World Cup event in March 2007, and finished fifth at the 2007 Winter X Games. She announced her retirement from snowboarding in 2016.

== Television appearances ==
In 2017, Olafsen finished as runner-up against Anders Jacobsen in the eighth season of Mesternes Mester, an NRK series in which former competitive Norwegian athletes compete in various exercises with the aim of being crowned the "Master of Masters". Later that year, she won the 13th season of Skal vi danse, the Norwegian version of Dancing with the Stars, alongside professional dancer Jørgen Nilsen. The pair defeated actor Cengiz Al and Mai Mentzoni in the final. In 2021, she participated on Norges nye megahit, a series where celebrities compete against each other to create a hit song. Olafsen sang "Ludvig Daae", named after a real man who owned a slalom centre and had "strong opinions about behavior on the slalom slope". The song reached number one in Norway in December 2021. Ahead of the 2022 Skal vi danse: All Stars season, Olafsen was announced as the new presenter, joining Anders Hoff who had held the position since the 13th season.

== 2010 Olympics ==
Olafsen progressed all the way to the big final of Snowboard Cross at the 2010 Winter Olympics in Vancouver, she finished fourth. Canada's Maëlle Ricker went on to win the gold medal for the host country.

== Personal life ==
Olafsen has been in a relationship with Skal vi danse professional dancer and former winning dance partner Jørgen Nilsen since 2017. The couple announced their engagement in 2019. In April 2025, they got married. They have two children, a son and a daughter, born in March 2020 and March 2022 respectively.
