= Orthodox Calendar (wall calendar) =

Calendar with nude photos

The OC wall calendar is the title of a wall calendar and videos first published in 2012, featuring nude and semi-nude photographs of individuals dressed as members of the Eastern Orthodox Church. Produced by residents of Eastern Orthodox-majority Eastern European countries, the primary goal was to create the first organized global effort against homophobia in the region. According to the Huffington Post, the calendar's producers claimed the models were members of the Orthodox clergy; Romanian Orthodox Church authorities, in response, stated no Orthodox clergy were photographed for the calendar and that the claim there were was "calumny", and further called the calendar obscene. The calendar is released annually, and a five-year anniversary album was published in 2017 with images selected from earlier calendars.

== Reception ==
Launched in September 2012, the first edition of the calendar was met with positive reception from anti-homophobia advocates globally and in particular after it was covered by the Western press. Buyers included gay communities, as well as women, liberal believers, and those interested in avant-garde photography as art or social commentary. Though it was condemned by some in the Orthodox Church, buyers from many countries purchased the calendar online.
