= Belle Brockhoff =

Australian snowboarder (born 1993)

Personal information
- Nationality: Australian
- Born: 12 January 1993 (age 33) East Melbourne, Victoria, Australia
- Height: 1.70 m (5 ft 7 in)
- Weight: 70 kg (154 lb)

Sport
- Country: Australia
- Sport: Snowboarding
- Event: Snowboard cross
Medal record
Women's snowboarding
Representing Australia
World Championships
Gold medal – first place	2021 Idre	Mixed team snowboard cross
New Zealand Winter Games
Gold medal – first place	2011 Cardrona	Snowboard cross

Belle Brockhoff (born 12 January 1993) is an Australian snowboarder, who has represented Australia at the FIS Snowboarding World Championships and the Winter Olympics. She competes in snowboard cross. She competed at the 2022 Winter Olympics, in Women's snowboard cross.

She was a competitor in the 2013 FIS World Championship snowboard cross, and in the 2014 Winter Olympic snowboard cross.

She announced her retirement from competitive sport on 16 January 2026.

== Life ==
Brockhoff currently studies a Bachelor of Commerce at Deakin University, after previously studying a Bachelor of Commerce/Bachelor of Laws at Deakin University.

== Personal life ==
Brockhoff came out as a lesbian in August 2013. She is a supporter and endorser of the Principle 6 campaign, part of the Olympic protests of Russian anti-gay laws, but pledged to be cautious about how actively she protested while in Sochi due to the risk of arrest. In 2014 she appeared in the documentary film To Russia with Love.
