= Sandra Daniela Gerber =

Swiss snowboarder

Personal information
- Born: 13 June 1985 (age 41) Langnau im Emmental, Switzerland

Sport
- Sport: Skiing

Sandra Daniela Gerber (born 13 June 1985 in Langnau im Emmental) is a Swiss snowboarder, specializing in snowboard cross.

Gerber competed at the 2014 Winter Olympics for Switzerland. She was 10th in the snowboard cross seeding round, and then 4th in her quarterfinal, not advancing and finishing 13th overall.

As of September 2014, her best showing at the World Championships is 19th, in 2013.

Gerber made her World Cup debut in March 2011. As of September 2014, her best finish is 10th, at a pair of events in 2013–14. Her best overall finish is 15th, in 2013–14.
