= Out to Swim =

British aquatic sports club for LGBTQ+ people

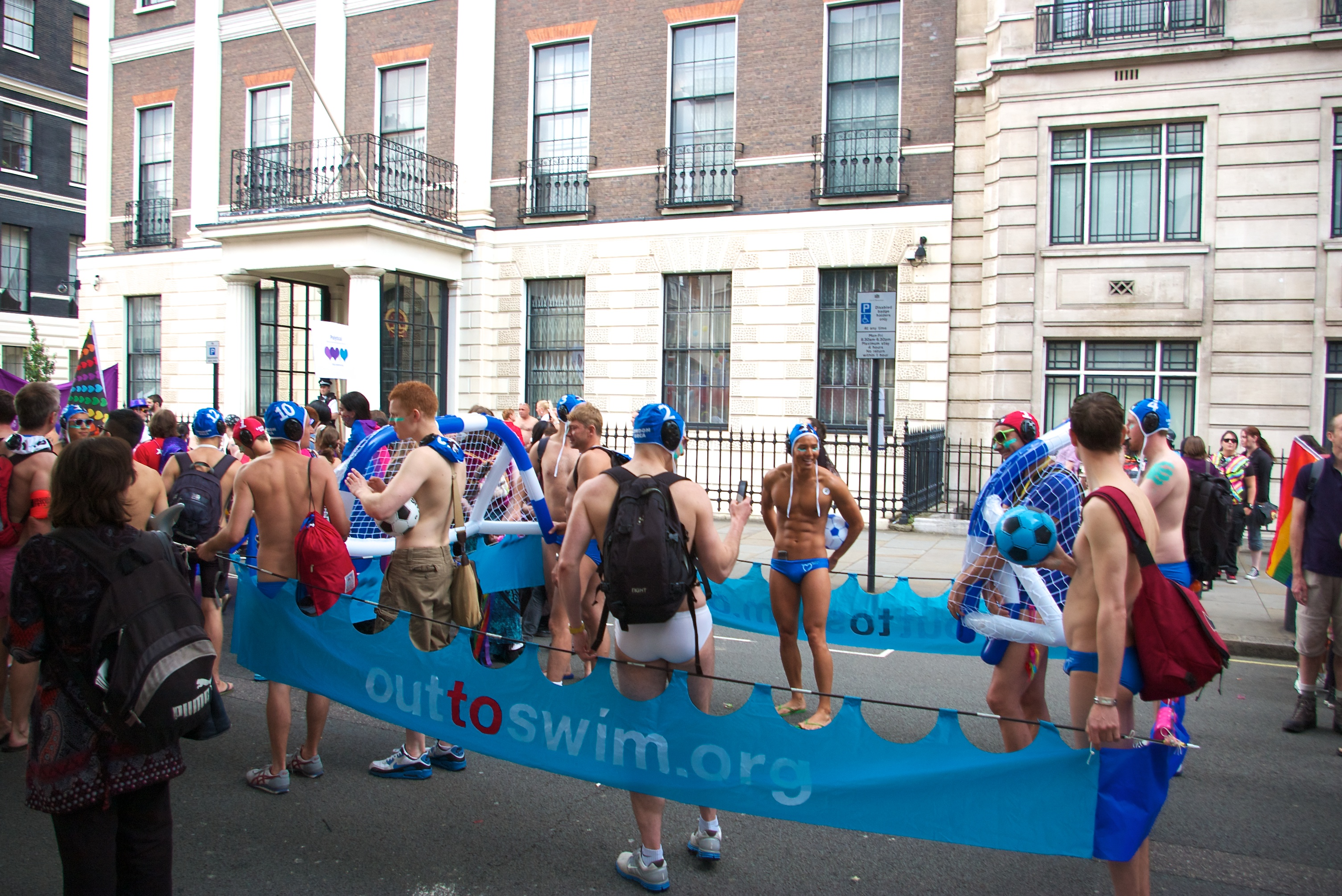
Out to Swim marching in Pride London 2011.

Out To Swim is a British aquatics sport club offering swimming, water polo and artistic swimming club for predominantly LGBTQ+ people and allied members. The club was founded by AGM when the name was agreed in March 1992. In 2006 "Out to swim Brighton" was formed in Brighton and Hove and 2018 "Out To Swim West" in Bristol.

Inspired by the swimming teams at the Gay Games in Vancouver in 1990, the club has competed at national and international competitions; it has expanded to include a synchronized swimming team, and regularly competes in open water events. Their first annual swimming competition was held in 1997 and attracted 23 gay and straight teams from all over Europe.

In June 2012 a team of six members from the club swam the English Channel for charity.

The club is also one of the few aquatics clubs in the world that offers men participation in synchronised swimming. In 2012 the club were part of a campaign for men to be allowed to compete in synchronized swimming at the 2012 Summer Olympics. Until 2022 artistic swimming was one of only two Olympic sports that discriminate on the basis of gender.

In 2019 Out To Swim registered as a charity in England & Wales with the stated aim of "The promotion, for the public benefit, of equality and diversity in swimming and other aquatic sports".

Out To Swim is a member of the International Gay & Lesbian Aquatics association and European Gay & Lesbian Sport Federation (EGLSF).
