= IGLA+ =

International governing body for gay and lesbian aquatics clubs

IGLA+ (formerly known as the International Gay & Lesbian Aquatics Association) is the international governing body for predominantly LGBT+ aquatics clubs, representing the sports of swimming, diving, artistic swimming, water polo, and open water swimming. Member clubs are from 16 countries, with the majority of clubs in the United States and Canada. Past presidents of the association have included Scott Kohanowski (of Team New York Aquatics) and Gareth Johnson (of Out to Swim London).

IGLA+ is one of the key organizations involved in the licensing of the Gay Games, which are held every four years. In years in which the Gay Games are not held, IGLA+ holds an international competition open to its member clubs. The organization is a part of the larger movement of a niche travel industry, LGBTQIA sports tourism.

== History ==
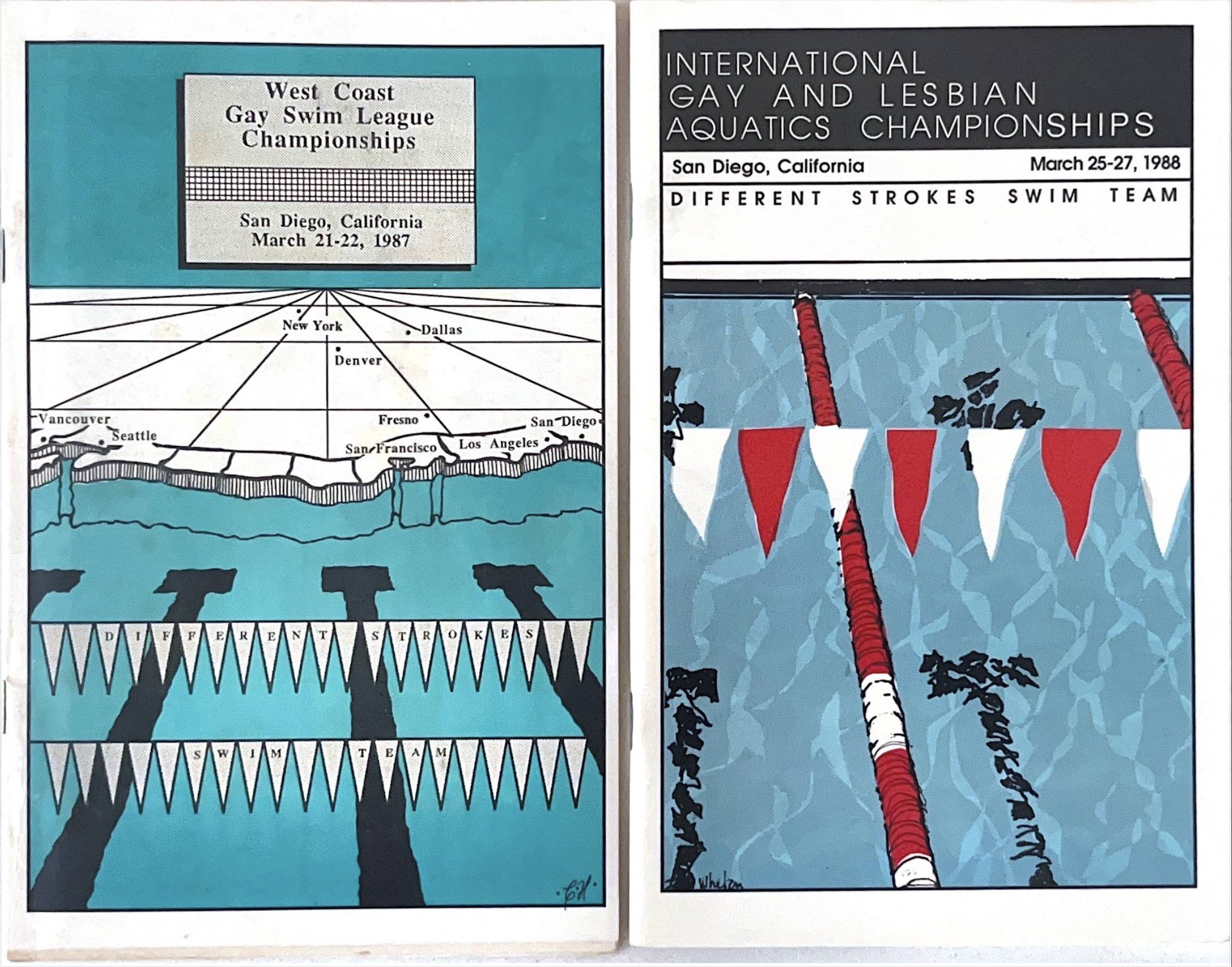
Programs from IGLA I (originally known as the West Coast Gay Swim League Championships) and II

IGLA+ began as the West Coast Gay Swim League in 1987 with teams from Berkeley, New York, San Diego, San Francisco, Seattle, Vancouver, and West Hollywood. Members of these teams had participated in Gay Games II and wanted to continue competing annually. After the first West Coast Gay Swim League Championship, hosted in March 1987 by the Different Strokes Swim Team in San Diego, the Seattle team hosted the Northwest Gay & Lesbian Sports Festival. At this festival, it was decided that the League would be renamed the International Gay and Lesbian Aquatics Association in hopes to grow beyond the US and Canada. By Gay Games III, IGLA was officially a part of the Games organizing. In 2024, International Gay & Lesbian Aquatics rebranded as IGLA+ to better represent the wider LGBTQIA+ community.

=== Championships ===
The host cities for the championships have been:

- 1987: IGLA I (Then known as the West Coast Gay Swim League Championship), San Diego, California
- 1988: IGLA II, San Diego, California
- 1989: IGLA III, Vancouver, British Columbia
  - 1990: Held in conjunction with Gay Games III, Vancouver, British Columbia
- 1991: IGLA IV, Los Angeles, California
- 1992: IGLA V, Seattle, Washington
- 1993: IGLA VI, Chicago, Illinois
  - 1994: Held in conjunction with Gay Games IV, New York, New York
- 1995: IGLA VII, Montreal, Québec
- 1996: IGLA VIII, Washington, D.C.
- 1997: IGLA IX, San Diego, California
  - 1998: Held in conjunction with Gay Games V, Amsterdam, Netherlands
- 1999: IGLA X, Atlanta, Georgia
- 2000: IGLA XI, Paris, France
- 2001: IGLA XII, Toronto, Ontario
  - 2002: Held in conjunction with Gay Games VI, Sydney, Australia
- 2003: IGLA XIII, San Francisco, California
- 2004: IGLA XIV, Fort Lauderdale, Florida
- 2005: IGLA XV, Atlanta, Georgia
  - 2006: Held in conjunction with Gay Games VII, Chicago, Illinois
- 2007: IGLA XVI, Paris, France
- 2008: IGLA XVII, Washington, D.C.
- 2009: IGLA XVIII, Copenhagen, Denmark
  - 2010: Held in conjunction with Gay Games VIII, Cologne, Germany
- 2011: IGLA XIX, Honolulu, Hawaii
- 2012: IGLA XX, Reykjavík, Iceland
- 2013: IGLA XXI, Seattle, Washington
  - 2014: Held in conjunction with Gay Games IX, Cleveland, Ohio
- 2015: IGLA XXII, Stockholm, Sweden
- 2016: Edmonton, Alberta
- 2017: IGLA 30th Anniversary - Miami
  - 2018: Held in conjunction with Gay Games X, Paris, France
- 2019: IGLA XXXI, New York City
- 2020: IGLA XXXII, Melbourne, Australia
- 2021: IGLA XXXIII, Salt Lake City, Utah, United States - Cancelled due to Covid-19
- 2022: IGLA XXXIV, Palm Springs, California
- 2023: IGLA XXXV, London, United Kingdom
- 2024: IGLA XXVI, Buenos Aires, Argentina
- 2025: IGLA XXVII, Washington, D.C.
