= Jacqueline Hernandez (snowboarder) =

American snowboarder (born 1992)

Jackie Hernandez
Personal information
- Full name: Jacqueline Hernandez
- Born: December 2, 1992 (age 32); Troy, New York, U.S.
- Home town: Londonderry, Vermont, U.S.
- Education: Westminster College
- Height: 6 ft 0 in (183 cm) (2014)
- Weight: 174 lb (79 kg) (2014)

Sport
- Country: United States
- Sport: Snowboarding

Jacqueline Hernandez (born December 2, 1992) is an American snowboarder. Hernandez was injured at the 2014 Winter Olympics in Sochi, Russia. She attended Westminster College in Utah.
