= Bell Berghuis =

Dutch snowboarder (born 1985)

Bell Berghuis (born 13 April 1985, Zürich) is a Dutch snowboarder. She represented the Netherlands at the 2014 Winter Olympics in Sochi.
