= Susanne Moll =

Austrian snowboarder

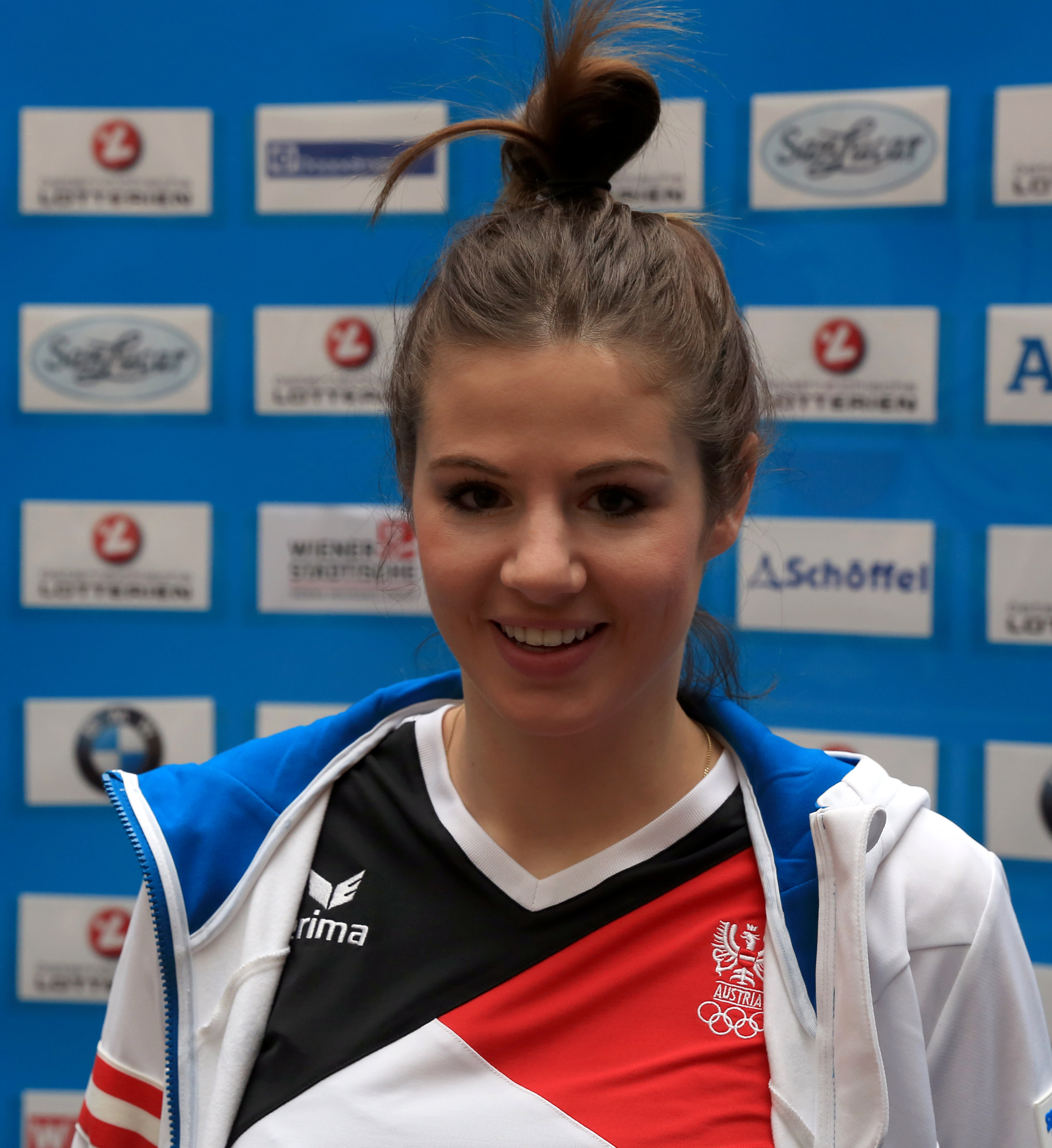
- Susanne Moll - Team Austria Winter Olympics 2014
- Born: 27 July 1987 (age 37); Dornbirn, Vorarlberg, Austria
- Occupation: Austrian snowboarder

Susanne Moll (born 27 July 1987) is an Austrian snowboarder. She has represented Austria at the 2014 Winter Olympics in Sochi.
