= Yuka Fujimori =

Japanese snowboarder (born 1986)

Yuka Fujimori (藤森 由香, Fujimori Yuka, born 11 June 1986) is a Japanese snowboarder. She has represented Japan at the Winter Olympics on four occasions: 2006 in Torino, 2010 in Vancouver, 2014 in Sochi, and 2018 in Pyeongchang.
