= Simona Meiler =

Swiss snowboarder

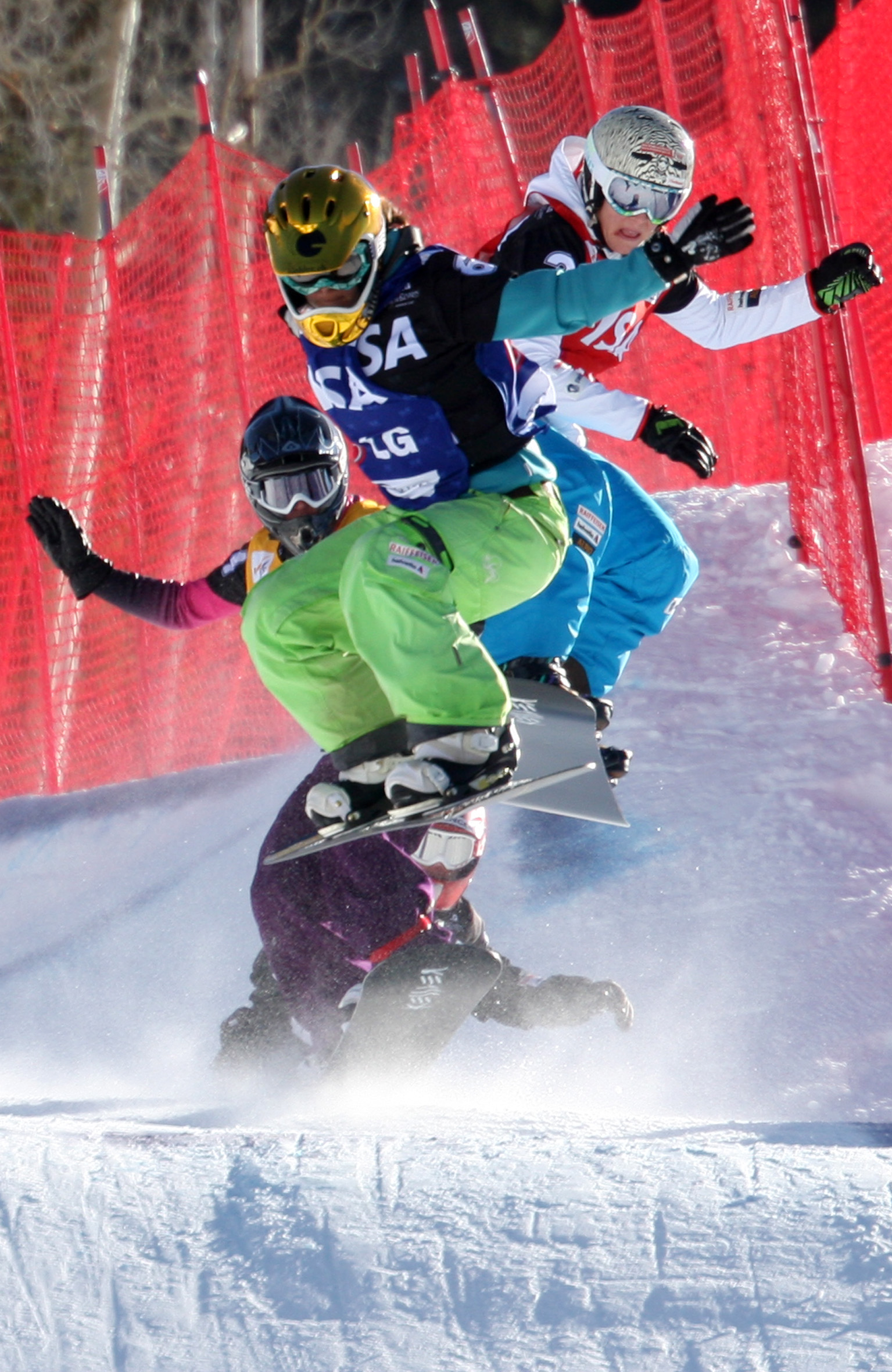

Personal information
- Born: 13 September 1989 (age 36) Flims, Switzerland

Sport
- Sport: Skiing
Medal record
Women's snowboarding
Representing Switzerland
Winter Universiade
Bronze medal – third place	2015 Granada	Snowboard cross

Simona Meiler (born 13 September 1989 in Flims) is a Swiss snowboarder. She has represented Switzerland at the 2010 Winter Olympics in Vancouver and the 2014 Winter Olympics in Sochi.
