= Maria Ramberger =

Austrian snowboarder (born 1986)

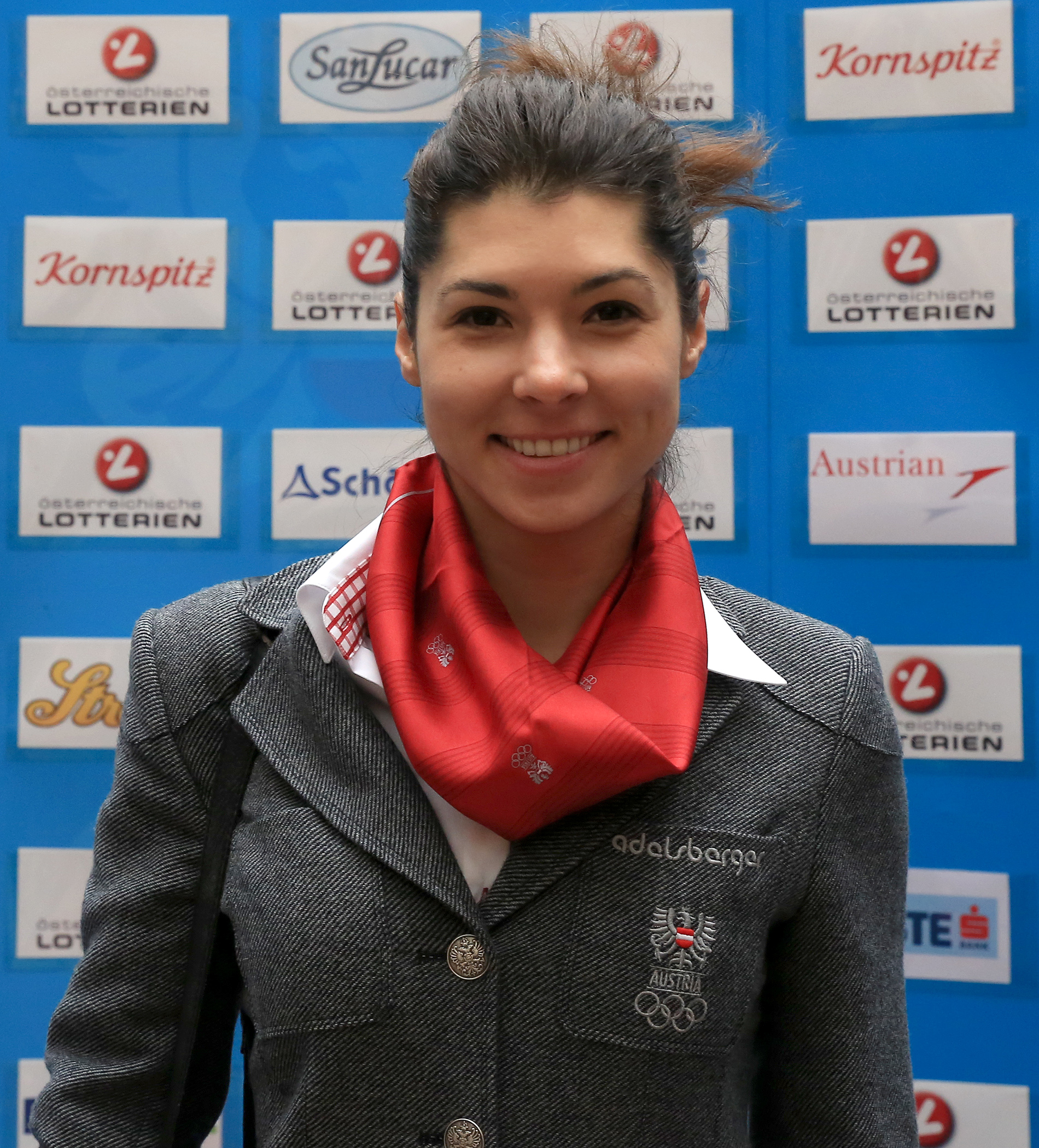
- Ramberger in 2014
- Born: 12 October 1986 (age 39); Vienna, Austria
- Occupation: Former Olympic Snowboarder
- Height: 1.66 m (5 ft 5 in)

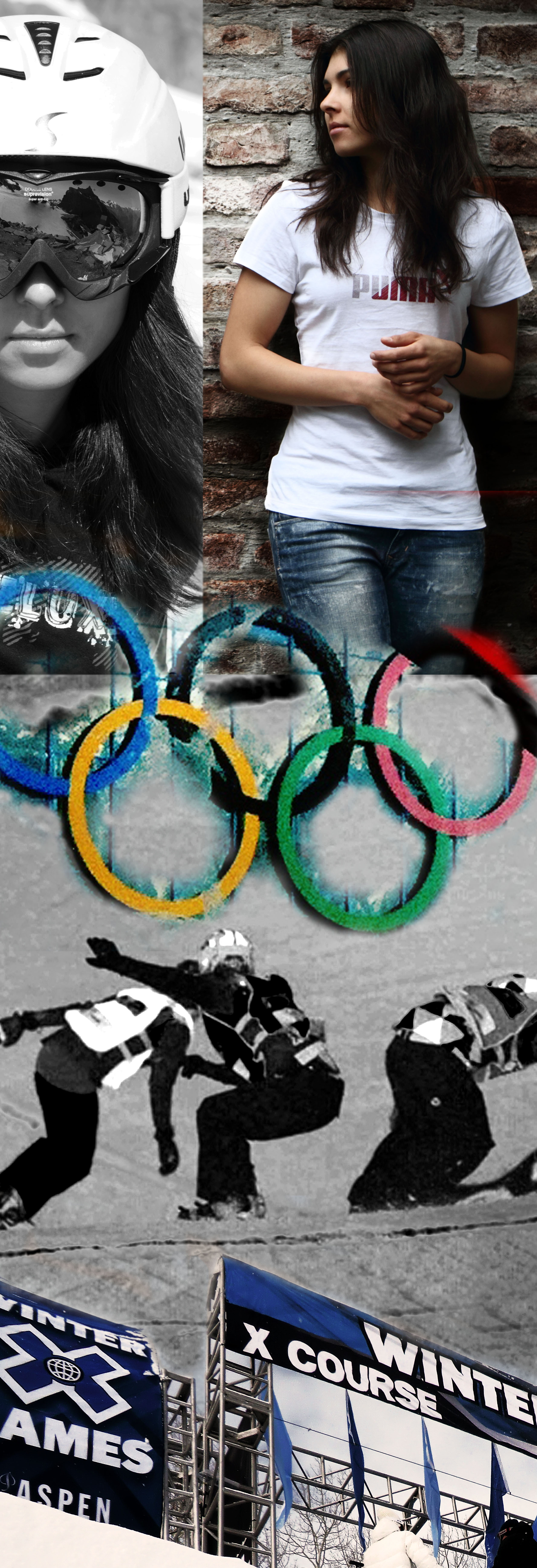

Maria Ramberger (born 12 October 1986) is an Austrian snowboarder who competed at the Winter Olympic Games in 2010 and 2014. She works as an engagement manager at McKinsey & Company where she served a broad range of tech clients across hardware, software and tech services. Born in Vienna, Austria she initially joined as part of the German office in 2017 and later transferred to the United States in early 2019. Before joining McKinsey she was a member of the Austrian National Snowboard Team. Maria also holds a PhD in law and served in the Austrian Armed Forces (2007 - 2012).

== Snowboard career ==
Starting her snowboarding journey at age 7 Maria succeeded in joining the National Austrian Snowboard Team and represented Austria at the 2010 Winter Olympics in Vancouver and the 2014 Winter Olympics in Sochi.

Despite growing up and attending high school in Klosterneuburg, Austria (a 4+ hour drive away from any larger ski area) Maria consistently proved herself as Austria's fastest female snowboardcross athlete. In 2010/11 and 2014/15 she managed to break into the top 10 globally and ended her season ranked 9th worldwide.

Additional career highlights include e.g., a World Cup Win, X-Games, World Championships, 4 National Championship Titles, 6 Europa Cup and 4 North American Cup victories. She retired in October 2016.

In tandem with her athletic career Maria was a member of the Austrian Armed Forces Athletic Division ('Heeressport') where she served as a Corporal (2007 - 2012) and acquired Masters and PhD degrees in law at the University of Vienna.
