= 2018–19 in skiing =

== Alpine skiing ==
=== FIS World Championships (AS) ===
- February 5 – 17: FIS Alpine World Ski Championships 2019 in (Sweden) Åre
  - Alpine Combined winners: (France) Alexis Pinturault (m) / (Switzerland) Wendy Holdener (f)
  - Downhill winners: (Norway) Kjetil Jansrud (m) / (Slovenia) Ilka Štuhec (f)
  - Giant Slalom winners: (Norway) Henrik Kristoffersen (m) / (Slovakia) Petra Vlhová (f)
  - Slalom winners: (Austria) Marcel Hirscher (m) / (United States) Mikaela Shiffrin (f)
  - Super G winners: (Italy) Dominik Paris (m) / (United States) Mikaela Shiffrin (f)
  - Alpine Team Event winners: Switzerland (Aline Danioth, Wendy Holdener, Daniel Yule, & Ramon Zenhäusern)
- February 18 – 27: World Junior Alpine Skiing Championships 2019 in (Italy) Fassa Valley
  - Junior Giant Slalom winners: (United States) River Radamus (m) / (New Zealand) Alice Robinson (f)
  - Junior Slalom winners: (Italy) Alex Vinatzer (m) / (Slovenia) Meta Hrovat (f)
  - Junior Downhill winners: (Switzerland) Lars Roesti (m) / (Switzerland) Juliana Suter (f)
  - Junior Super G winners: (United States) River Radamus (m) / (Norway) Hannah Saethereng (f)
  - Junior Alpine Combined winners: (Sweden) Tobias Hedstroem (m) / (Switzerland) Nicole Good (f)
  - Junior Mixed Alpine Team Event winners: France (Marie Lamure, Jeremie Lagier, Doriane Escane, & Augustin Bianchini)

=== 2018–19 FIS Alpine Ski World Cup ===
- Note: For the FIS page about these events, click here.
- October 2018
  - October 27 & 28: ASWC #1 in (Austria) Sölden
    - Note: The men's giant slalom event was cancelled, due to huge amounts of snow.
    - Women's Giant Slalom winner: (France) Tessa Worley
- November 2018
  - November 17 & 18: ASWC #2 in (Finland) Levi
    - Slalom winners: (Austria) Marcel Hirscher (m) / (United States) Mikaela Shiffrin (f)
  - November 21 – 25: ASWC #3 in (Canada) Lake Louise Ski Resort #1
    - Men's Downhill winner: (Austria) Max Franz
    - Men's Super G winner: (Norway) Kjetil Jansrud
  - November 24 & 25: ASWC #4 in (United States) Killington Ski Resort
    - Women's Giant Slalom winner: (Italy) Federica Brignone
    - Women's Slalom winner: (United States) Mikaela Shiffrin
  - November 27 – December 2: ASWC #5 in (Canada) Lake Louise Ski Resort #2
    - Women's Downhill winner: (Austria) Nicole Schmidhofer (2 times)
    - Women's Super G winner: (United States) Mikaela Shiffrin
  - November 27 – December 2: ASWC #6 in (United States) Beaver Creek Resort
    - Men's Super G winner: (Austria) Max Franz
    - Men's Downhill winner: (Switzerland) Beat Feuz
    - Men's Giant Slalom winner: (Germany) Stefan Luitz
- December 2018
  - December 8 & 9: ASWC #8 in (France) Val-d'Isère #1
    - Note: The men's slalom event was cancelled.
    - Men's Giant Slalom winner: (Austria) Marcel Hirscher
  - December 8 & 9: ASWC #7 in (Switzerland) St. Moritz
    - Women's Super G & Parallel Slalom winner: (United States) Mikaela Shiffrin
  - December 12 – 15: ASWC #9 in (Italy) Val Gardena #1
    - Men's Super G winner: (Norway) Aksel Lund Svindal
    - Men's Downhill winner: (Norway) Aleksander Aamodt Kilde
  - December 16 & 17: ASWC #10 in (Italy) Alta Badia
    - Men's Giant Slalom & Parallel Giant Slalom winner: (Austria) Marcel Hirscher
  - December 17 – 20: ASWC #11 in (Italy) Val Gardena #2
    - Note: The women's alpine combined event was cancelled.
    - Women's Downhill & Super G winner: (Slovenia) Ilka Štuhec
  - December 19 & 20: ASWC #12 in (Austria) Saalbach-Hinterglemm
    - Men's Giant Slalom winner: (Slovenia) Žan Kranjec
    - Men's Slalom winner: (Austria) Marcel Hirscher
  - December 21 & 22: ASWC #13 in (France) Courchevel
    - Women's Giant Slalom & Slalom winner: (United States) Mikaela Shiffrin
  - December 22: ASWC #14 in (Italy) Madonna di Campiglio
    - Men's Slalom winner: (Switzerland) Daniel Yule
  - December 26 – 29: ASWC #15 in (Italy) Bormio
    - Men's Downhill & Super G winner: (Italy) Dominik Paris
  - December 28 & 29: ASWC #16 in (Austria) Semmering
    - Women's Giant Slalom winner: (Slovakia) Petra Vlhová
    - Women's Slalom winner: (United States) Mikaela Shiffrin
- January 2019
  - January 1: ASWC #17 in (Norway) Oslo
    - City Event winners: (Austria) Marco Schwarz (m) / (Slovakia) Petra Vlhová (f)
  - January 5 & 6: ASWC #18 in (Croatia) Zagreb
    - Slalom winners: (Austria) Marcel Hirscher (m) / (United States) Mikaela Shiffrin (f)
  - January 8: ASWC #19 in (Austria) Flachau
    - Women's Slalom winner: (Slovakia) Petra Vlhová
  - January 10 – 13: ASWC #20 in (Austria) St Anton am Arlberg
    - Event cancelled.
  - January 12 & 13: ASWC #21 in (Switzerland) Adelboden
    - Men's Giant Slalom & Slalom winner: (Austria) Marcel Hirscher
  - January 15: ASWC #22 in (Italy) Kronplatz
    - Women's Giant Slalom winner: (United States) Mikaela Shiffrin
  - January 15 – 20: ASWC #23 in (Switzerland) Wengen
    - Men's Alpine Combined winner: (Austria) Marco Schwarz
    - Men's Downhill winner: (Austria) Vincent Kriechmayr
    - Men's Slalom winner: (France) Clément Noël
  - January 17 – 20: ASWC #24 in (Italy) Cortina d'Ampezzo
    - Women's Downhill winner: (Austria) Ramona Siebenhofer (2 times)
    - Women's Super G winner: (United States) Mikaela Shiffrin
  - January 22 – 27: ASWC #25 in (Austria) Kitzbühel
    - Men's Downhill winner: (Italy) Dominik Paris
    - Men's Slalom winner: (France) Clément Noël
    - Men's Super G winner: (Germany) Josef Ferstl
  - January 24 – 27: ASWC #26 in (Germany) Garmisch-Partenkirchen #1
    - Women's Super G winner: (Austria) Nicole Schmidhofer
    - Women's Downhill winner: (Austria) Stephanie Venier
  - January 29: ASWC #27 in (Austria) Schladming
    - Men's Slalom winner: (Austria) Marcel Hirscher
  - January 31 – February 3: ASWC #28 in (Germany) Garmisch-Partenkirchen #2
    - Event cancelled.
- February 2019
  - February 1 & 2: ASWC #29 in (Slovenia) Maribor
    - Women's Giant Slalom winner: (Slovakia) Petra Vlhová
    - Women's Slalom winner: (United States) Mikaela Shiffrin
  - February 19: ASWC #30 in (Sweden) Stockholm
    - City Event winners: (Switzerland) Ramon Zenhäusern (m) / (United States) Mikaela Shiffrin (f)
  - February 21 – 24: ASWC #31 in (Switzerland) Crans-Montana
    - Women's Downhill winner: (Italy) Sofia Goggia
    - Women's Alpine Combined winner: (Italy) Federica Brignone
  - February 22 – 24: ASWC #32 in (Bulgaria) Bansko
    - Note: The men's super G event here was cancelled.
    - Men's Alpine Combined winner: (France) Alexis Pinturault
    - Men's Giant Slalom winner: (Norway) Henrik Kristoffersen
  - February 27 – March 3: ASWC #33 in (Russia) Rosa Khutor Alpine Resort
    - Event cancelled.
  - February 28 – March 3: ASWC #34 in (Norway) Kvitfjell
    - Note: The second men's downhill event here was cancelled.
    - Men's Downhill & Super G winner: (Italy) Dominik Paris
- March 2019
  - March 8 & 9: ASWC #35 in (Czech Republic) Špindlerův Mlýn
    - Women's Giant Slalom winner: (Slovakia) Petra Vlhová
    - Women's Slalom winner: (United States) Mikaela Shiffrin
  - March 9 & 10: ASWC #36 in (Slovenia) Kranjska Gora Ski Resort
    - Men's Giant Slalom winner: (Norway) Henrik Kristoffersen
    - Men's Slalom winner: (Switzerland) Ramon Zenhäusern
  - March 11 – 17: ASWC #37 (final) in (Andorra) Soldeu
    - Downhill winners: (Italy) Dominik Paris (m) / (Austria) Mirjam Puchner (f)
    - Super G winners: (Italy) Dominik Paris (m) / (Germany) Viktoria Rebensburg (f)
    - Team Alpine Event winners: Switzerland (Aline Danioth, Wendy Holdener, Daniel Yule, & Ramon Zenhäusern)
    - Giant Slalom winners: (France) Alexis Pinturault (m) / (United States) Mikaela Shiffrin (f)
    - Slalom winners: (France) Clément Noël (m) / (United States) Mikaela Shiffrin (f)

=== 2018–19 FIS Alpine Skiing European Cup ===
- Note: For the FIS page about these events, click here.
- November 2018
  - November 29 & 30: ECAS #1 in (Finland) Levi
    - Men's Slalom winners: (Switzerland) Sandro Simonet (#1) / (Italy) Alex Vinatzer (#2)
  - November 30 & December 1: ECAS #2 in (Sweden) Funäsdalen #1
    - Women's Giant Slalom winners: (Norway) Kristine Gjelsten Haugen (#1) / (Austria) Julia Scheib (#2)
- December 2018
  - December 3 & 4: ECAS #3 in (Norway) Trysil
    - Women's Slalom winners: (Sweden) Ylva Staalnacke (#1) / (France) Nastasia Noens (#2)
  - December 4 & 5: ECAS #4 in (Sweden) Funäsdalen #2
    - Men's Giant Slalom winners: (Italy) Simon Maurberger (#1) / (Norway) Fabian Wilkens Solheim (#2)
  - December 6 & 7: ECAS #5 in (Norway) Kvitfjell
    - Women's Super G winner: (Austria) Christina Ager
    - Women's Alpine Combined winner: (France) Anne-Sophie Barthet
  - December 11 & 12: ECAS #6 in (Switzerland) St. Moritz
    - Note: The men's alpine combined event here was cancelled.
    - Men's Super G winners: (Switzerland) Marco Odermatt (#1) / (Switzerland) Stefan Rogentin (#2)
  - December 13 & 14: ECAS #7 in (Italy) Andalo-Paganella #1
    - Women's Giant Slalom winner: (Poland) Maryna Gąsienica-Daniel (2 times)
  - December 17 & 18: ECAS #8 in (Italy) Andalo-Paganella #2
    - Men's Giant Slalom winners: (Switzerland) Cedric Noger (#1) / (Norway) Lucas Braathen (#2)
  - December 17 – 21: ECAS #9 in (Austria) Zauchensee
    - Women's Downhill winner: (Italy) Nadia Delago (2 times)
    - Women's Super G winner: (Austria) Elisabeth Reisinger
    - Men's Super G winners: (Switzerland) Gino Caviezel (#1) / (Austria) Stefan Babinsky (#2)
  - December 19: ECAS #10 in (Italy) Obereggen
    - Men's Slalom winner: (Croatia) Istok Rodeš
  - December 21 & 22: ECAS #11 in (Austria) Saalbach-Hinterglemm
    - Event cancelled.
- January 2019
  - January 6 & 7: ECAS #12 in (France) Val-Cenis
    - Men's Slalom winner: (Italy) Simon Maurberger (2 times)
  - January 9 – 12: ECAS #13 in (Switzerland) Wengen
    - Note: The second men's downhill event here was cancelled.
    - Men's Downhill winner: (Italy) Mattia Casse
  - January 11 & 12: ECAS #14 in (Austria) Göstling-Hochkar
    - Event cancelled.
  - January 14 & 15: ECAS #15 in (Austria) Reiteralm
    - Event cancelled.
  - January 15 – 18: ECAS #16 in (Italy) Fassa Valley
    - Women's Downhill winners: (Austria) Elisabeth Reisinger (#1) / (Italy) Nadia Delago (#2)
  - January 17: ECAS #17 in (Italy) Kronplatz
    - Men's Giant Slalom winner: (Norway) Lucas Braathen
  - January 19 – 21: ECAS #18 in (Austria) Kitzbühel
    - Men's Downhill winner: (Austria) Daniel Danklmaier
  - January 21 & 22: ECAS #19 in (Switzerland) Zinal
    - Women's Giant Slalom winners: (Austria) Franziska Gritsch (#1) / (Sweden) Ylva Staalnacke (#2)
  - January 23 & 24: ECAS #20 in (France) Courchevel
    - Men's Giant Slalom winners: (Norway) Lucas Braathen (#1) / (Austria) Stefan Brennsteiner (#2)
  - January 24 & 25: ECAS #21 in (Switzerland) Melchsee-Frutt
    - Women's Slalom winners: (Slovenia) Meta Hrovat (#1) / (Germany) Marlene Schmotz (#2)
  - January 27 – 30: ECAS #22 in (France) Chamonix
    - Men's Downhill winner: (France) Victor Schuller (2 times)
  - January 28 & 29: ECAS #23 in (Switzerland) Les Diablerets
    - Women's Alpine Combined winner: (Switzerland) Nicole Good
    - Women's Super G winner: (Austria) Elisabeth Reisinger (2 times)
  - January 31 & February 1: ECAS #24 in (France) Tignes
    - Women's Giant Slalom winner: (Switzerland) Lindy Etzensperger
    - Parallel Slalom winners: (Austria) Pirmin Hacker (m) / (France) Marie Lamure (f)
- February 2019
  - February 4 & 5: ECAS #25 in (Switzerland) Gstaad-Saanenland
    - Men's Slalom winners: (Croatia) Istok Rodeš (#1) / (Norway) Jonathan Nordbotten (#2)
  - February 4 & 5: ECAS #26 in (Austria) Obdach
    - Women's Slalom winners: (Austria) Katharina Huber (#1) / (Czech Republic) Gabriela Capová (#2)
  - February 9 & 10: ECAS #27 in (Germany) Berchtesgaden
    - Women's Giant Slalom winners: (New Zealand) Alice Robinson (#1) / (Norway) Kaja Norbye (#2)
  - February 11 – 15: ECAS #28 in (Italy) Sarntal
    - Men's Downhill winners: (United States) Thomas Biesemeyer (#1) / (Austria) Christopher Neumayer (#2)
    - Men's Alpine Combined winner: (Germany) Christof Brandner
    - Men's Super G winner: (Italy) Davide Cazzaniga
  - February 14 – 17: ECAS #29 in (Switzerland) Crans-Montana
    - Women's Downhill winner: (Austria) Elisabeth Reisinger (2 times)
  - February 28 – March 2: ECAS #30 in (Germany) Oberjoch
    - Note: Both men's slalom events here were cancelled.
    - Men's Giant Slalom winner: (Italy) Andrea Ballerin
- March 2019
  - March 2 & 3: ECAS #31 in (Slovakia) Jasná
    - Women's Giant Slalom & Slalom winner: (Slovakia) Petra Vlhová
  - March 5 – 7: ECAS #32 in (Austria) Hinterstoder
    - Men's Giant Slalom winner: (Norway) Bjørnar Neteland
  - March 11 & 12: ECAS #33 in (Slovenia) Kranjska Gora
    - Men's Giant Slalom winner: (Italy) Hannes Zingerle
    - Men's Slalom winner: (Norway) Jonathan Nordbotten
  - March 11 – 17: ECAS #34 in (Italy) Sella Nevea
    - Men's Super G winner: (France) Roy Piccard (2 times)
    - Women's Super G winner: (Italy) Roberta Melesi
    - Downhill winners: (Switzerland) Urs Kryenbühl (m) / (Switzerland) Priska Nufer (f)
    - Men's Alpine Combined winner: (Italy) Simon Maurberger
  - March 16 & 17: ECAS #35 (final) in (Italy) Folgaria
    - Women's Giant Slalom winner: (Austria) Julia Scheib
    - Women's Slalom winner: (United Kingdom) Charlie Guest

=== 2018–19 FIS Alpine Skiing Nor-Am Cup ===
- Note: For the FIS page about these events, click here.
- December 3 – 7, 2018: SNAC #1 in (Alberta) Lake Louise Ski Resort
  - Note: The alpine combined events here were cancelled.
  - Men's Downhill winner: (Canada) James Crawford (2 times)
  - Women's Downhill winner: (United States) A.J. Hurt (2 times)
  - Super G winners: (United States) Samuel Dupratt (m) / (United States) A.J. Hurt (f)
- December 10 – 16, 2018: SNAC #2 in (British Columbia) Panorama Mountain Village
  - Alpine Combined winners: (Canada) Jeffery Read (m) / (United States) A.J. Hurt (f)
  - Men's Super G winners: (United States) Samuel Dupratt (#1) / (Canada) Sam Mulligan (#2)
  - Women's Super G winners: (United States) Nina O'Brien (#1) / (United States) A.J. Hurt (#2)
  - Men's Giant Slalom winners: (Canada) Simon Fournier (#1) / (United States) Nicholas Krause (#2)
  - Women's Giant Slalom winners: (United States) Nina O'Brien (#1) / (United States) Patricia Mangan (#2)
  - Men's Slalom winners: (United States) Mark Engel (#1) / (Canada) Simon Fournier (#2)
  - Women's Slalom winners: (United States) Foreste Peterson (#1) / (United States) Katie Hensien (#2)
- January 2 & 3: SNAC #3 in (Ontario) Georgian Peaks Club
  - Women's Giant Slalom winner: (United States) Nina O'Brien (2 times)
- January 3 – 5: SNAC #4 in (Quebec) Camp Fortune
  - Men's Slalom winners: (Canada) Simon Fournier (#1) / (United States) Benjamin Ritchie (#2)
- January 4: SNAC #5 in (Ontario) Alpine Ski Club
  - Women's Parallel Slalom winner: (Norway) Tuva Norbye
- January 4 – 6: SNAC #6 in (Ontario) Osler Bluff
  - Women's Slalom winners: (United States) Katie Hensien (#1) / (United States) Nina O'Brien (#2)
- January 5 – 7: SNAC #7 in (Quebec) Mont Ste. Marie
  - Men's Giant Slalom winners: (Norway) Aage Solheim (#1) / (United States) Nicholas Krause (#2)
  - Men's Parallel Slalom winner: (Austria) Tobias Kogler
- February 5 – 8: SNAC #8 in (Idaho) Sun Valley
  - Men's Slalom winners: (United States) Luke Winters (#1) / (Austria) Tobias Kogler (#2)
  - Men's Giant Slalom winners: (Norway) Max Roeisland (#1) / (United States) River Radamus (#2)
- February 5 – 8: SNAC #9 in (Wyoming) Snow King Mountain
  - Women's Slalom winner: (Canada) Amelia Smart (2 times)
  - Women's Giant Slalom winners: (United States) Keely Cashman (#1) / (Netherlands) Adriana Jelinkova (#2)
- March 12 – 15: SNAC #10 in (Vermont) Stowe Mountain Resort
  - Women's Giant Slalom winners: (Canada) Mikaela Tommy (#1) / (Netherlands) Adriana Jelinkova (#2)
  - Women's Slalom winners: (Canada) Amelia Smart (#1) / (United States) Nina O'Brien (#2)
- March 12 – 15: SNAC #11 in (Vermont) Burke Mountain Ski Area
  - Men's Giant Slalom winner: (Switzerland) Tanguy Nef (2 times)
  - Men's Slalom winners: (United States) Kyle Negomir (#1) / (Germany) Fritz Dopfer (#2)
- March 16 – 21: SNAC #12 (final) in (Maine) Sugarloaf
  - Men's Downhill winners: (United States) Thomas Biesemeyer (#1) / (United States) Ryan Cochran-Siegle (#2)
  - Women's Downhill winners: (United States) Nina O'Brien (#1) / (United States) Alice Merryweather (#2)
  - Alpine Combined winners: (United States) Luke Winters (m) / (United States) Nina O'Brien (f)
  - Men's Super G winners: (United States) Ryan Cochran-Siegle (#1) / (United States) River Radamus (#2)
  - Women's Super G winners: (United States) Keely Cashman (#1) / (United States) Nina O'Brien (#2)

=== 2018–19 FIS Alpine Skiing Far East Cup ===
- Note: For the FIS page about these events, click here.
- December 4 – 7, 2018: FEC #1 in (China) Wanlong Ski Resorts
  - Men's Slalom winners: (Czech Republic) Jan Zabystřan (#1) / (South Korea) Jung Dong-hyun (#2)
  - Women's Slalom winners: (Japan) Asa Ando (#1) / (Sweden) Liv Ceder (#2)
  - Men's Giant Slalom winner: (South Korea) Jung Dong-hyun (2 times)
  - Women's Giant Slalom winners: (Japan) Asa Ando (#1) / (New Zealand) Piera Hudson (#2)
- December 10 – 13, 2018: FEC #2 in (China) Taiwoo Ski Resorts
  - Men's Slalom winners: (Bulgaria) Kamen Zlatkov (#1) / (South Korea) Jung Dong-hyun (#2)
  - Women's Slalom winners: (Sweden) Liv Ceder (#1) / (New Zealand) Piera Hudson (#2)
  - Men's Giant Slalom winner: (South Korea) Jung Dong-hyun (2 times)
  - Women's Giant Slalom winner: (New Zealand) Piera Hudson (2 times)
- February 7 – 9: FEC #3 in (South Korea) Yongpyong Resort
  - Note: The Super G events here were cancelled.
  - Slalom winners: (South Korea) Jung Dong-hyun (m) / (South Korea) Gim So-hui (f)
  - Giant Slalom winners: (South Korea) Jung Dong-hyun (m) / (South Korea) Kang Young-seo (f)
- February 12 – 15: FEC #4 in (South Korea) Bears Town Resort
  - Men's Slalom winners: (Japan) Hideyuki Narita (#1) / (Japan) Yohei Koyama (#2)
  - Women's Slalom winner: (Japan) Makiko Arai (2 times)
  - Men's Giant Slalom winners: (Switzerland) Noel von Gruenigen (#1) / (Japan) Seigo Kato (#2)
  - Women's Giant Slalom winners: (Japan) Konatsu Hasumi (#1) / (South Korea) Kang Young-seo (#2)
- February 24 – 27: FEC #5 in (Japan) Hanawa
  - Men's Giant Slalom winner: (Switzerland) Reto Schmidiger (2 times)
  - Women's Giant Slalom winner: (Japan) Asa Ando (2 times)
  - Slalom winners: (Switzerland) Reto Schmidiger (m) / (Japan) Chisaki Maeda (f)
- March 2 – 5: FEC #6 in (Japan) Engaru
  - Giant Slalom winners: (Switzerland) Reto Schmidiger (m) / (Japan) Mio Arai (f)
  - Men's Slalom winner: (Switzerland) Reto Schmidiger (2 times)
  - Women's Slalom winner: (Sweden) Michelle Kerven (2 times)
- March 19 – 25: FEC #7 (final) in (Russia) Yuzhno-Sakhalinsk
  - Men's Super G winners: (Russia) Ivan Kuznetsov (#1) / (Czech Republic) Jan Zabystřan (#2)
  - Women's Super G winner: (Russia) Iulija Pleshkova (2 times)
  - Alpine Combined winners: (Russia) Ivan Kuznetsov (m) / (Serbia) Nevena Ignjatović (f)
  - Men's Giant Slalom winner: (Russia) Pavel Trikhichev (2 times)
  - Women's Giant Slalom winner: (Slovenia) Ana Bucik (2 times)
  - Men's Slalom winners: (Russia) Pavel Trikhichev (#1) / (Czech Republic) Jan Zabystřan (#2)
  - Women's Slalom winners: (Slovenia) Maruša Ferk (#1) / (Slovenia) Ana Bucik (#2)

=== 2018 FIS Alpine Skiing Australia & New Zealand Cup ===
- Note: For the FIS page about these events, click here.
- August 20 – 24: A&NZ #1 in (Australia) Hotham Alpine Resort
  - Men's Giant Slalom winner: (Slovakia) Adam Žampa (2 times)
  - Women's Giant Slalom winner: (Germany) Lena Dürr (2 times)
  - Men's Slalom winners: (Netherlands) Steffan Winkelhorst (#1) / (Slovakia) Adam Žampa (#2)
  - Women's Slalom winners: (Switzerland) Charlotte Chable (#1) / (Slovenia) Neja Dvornik (#2)
- August 27 – 30: A&NZ #2 in (New Zealand) Coronet Peak
  - Men's Giant Slalom winners: (Slovakia) Adam Žampa (#1) / (Belgium) Sam Maes (#2)
  - Women's Giant Slalom winners: (New Zealand) Alice Robinson (#1) / (Austria) Katharina Truppe (#2)
  - Men's Slalom winners: (Switzerland) Marc Rochat (#1) / (Slovakia) Adam Žampa (#2)
  - Women's Slalom winners: (Switzerland) Charlotte Chable (#1) / (United Kingdom) Charlie Guest (#2)
- September 3 – 6: A&NZ #3 (final) in (New Zealand) Mount Hutt
  - Men's Super G winner: (Netherlands) Maarten Meiners (2 times)
  - Women's Super G winner: (New Zealand) Alice Robinson (2 times)

=== 2018 FIS Alpine Skiing South American Cup ===
- Note: For the FIS page about these events, click here.
- August 14 – 17: SAC #1 in (Argentina) Cerro Catedral
  - Note: The second set of Giant Slalom and Slalom events were cancelled.
  - Slalom winners: (Argentina) Tomas Birkner De Miguel (m) / (Argentina) Francesca Baruzzi Farriol (f)
  - Giant Slalom winners: (France) Vito Cottineau (m) / (Argentina) Carolina Blaquier (f)
- August 25 – 28: SAC #2 in (Argentina) Las Leñas
  - Note: The Super G events were cancelled.
  - Slalom winners: (Argentina) Enrique Evia y Roca (m) / (Argentina) Francesca Baruzzi Farriol (f)
  - Men's Giant Slalom winners: (Chile) Diego Holscher (#1) / (Argentina) Cristian Javier Simari Birkner (#2)
  - Women's Giant Slalom winners: (Argentina) Francesca Baruzzi Farriol (#1) / (Switzerland) Andrea Ellenberger (#2)
- September 1: SAC #3 in (Chile) El Colorado #1
  - Giant Slalom winners: (Norway) Rasmus Windingstad (m) / (Norway) Kajsa Vickhoff Lie (f)
- September 2 – 7: SAC #4 in (Chile) La Parva
  - Slalom winners: (Czech Republic) Ondřej Berndt (m) / (Norway) Kristin Lysdahl (f)
  - Men's Downhill winners: (Slovenia) Klemen Kosi (#1) / (Germany) Dominik Schwaiger (#2)
  - Women's Downhill winner: (Russia) Aleksandra Prokopyeva (2 times)
  - Men's Super G winners: (France) Johan Clarey (#1) / (Germany) Andreas Sander (#2)
  - Women's Super G winner: (Russia) Aleksandra Prokopyeva (2 times)
- September 10 – 13: SAC #5 in (Chile) El Colorado #2
  - Note: All other alpine skiing events, except for the Super G ones, were cancelled.
  - Men's Super G winners: (Germany) Manuel Schmid (#1) / (Slovenia) Klemen Kosi (#2)
  - Women's Super G winners: (Slovenia) Ilka Štuhec (#1) / (Andorra) Cande Moreno Becerra (#2)
- September 17 – 20: SAC #6 (final) in (Argentina) Cerro Castor
  - Men's Slalom winners: (France) Jean-Baptiste Grange (#1) / (Italy) Simon Maurberger (#2)
  - Women's Slalom winner: (Andorra) Mireia Gutiérrez (2 times)
  - Giant Slalom winners: (Russia) Pavel Trikhichev (m) / (France) Tessa Worley (f)

=== 2018 FIS Grass Skiing World Cup & Junior World Championship ===
- Note 1: For the FIS page about the World Cup events, click here.
- Note 2: For the FIS page about the Junior World Championships event, click here.
- June 16 & 17, 2018: GSWC #1 in (Austria) Rettenbach
  - Giant Slalom winners: (Italy) Edoardo Frau (m) / (Austria) Kristin Hetfleisch (f)
  - Super Combined winners: (Switzerland) Mirko Hüppi (m) / (Austria) Kristin Hetfleisch (f)
  - Super G winners: (Italy) Edoardo Frau (m) / (Austria) Kristin Hetfleisch (f)
- June 30 & July 1, 2018: GSWC #2 in (Czech Republic) Předklášteří
  - Giant Slalom winners: (Austria) Hannes Angerer (m) / (Austria) Jacqueline Gerlach (f)
  - Slalom winners: (Switzerland) Mirko Hüppi (m) / (Austria) Jacqueline Gerlach (f)
- July 28 & 29, 2018: GSWC #3 in (Italy) Montecampione
  - Giant Slalom winners: (Italy) Edoardo Frau (m) / (Japan) Chisaki Maeda (f)
  - Slalom winners: (Italy) Lorenzo Dante Marco Gritti (m) / (Austria) Kristin Hetfleisch (f)
- July 30 – August 4, 2018: 2018 FIS Grass Ski Junior World Championships in (Italy) Montecampione
  - Giant Slalom winners: (Czech Republic) Martin Barták (m) / (Japan) Chisaki Maeda (f)
  - Slalom winners: (Czech Republic) Martin Barták (m) / (Japan) Chisaki Maeda (f)
  - Super Combined winners: (Czech Republic) Martin Barták (m) / (Japan) Chisaki Maeda (f)
  - Super G winners: (Czech Republic) Martin Barták (m) / (Japan) Chisaki Maeda (f)
- August 18 & 19: GSWC #4 in (Italy) San Sicario
  - Super Combined winners: (Italy) Edoardo Frau (m) / (Austria) Jacqueline Gerlach (f)
  - Super G winners: (Italy) Edoardo Frau (m) / (Austria) Jacqueline Gerlach (f)
  - Giant Slalom winners: (Italy) Edoardo Frau (m) / (Austria) Jacqueline Gerlach (f)
- August 31 – September 2: GSWC #5 in (Italy) Santa Caterina di Valfurva
  - Note: The men's & women's parallel slalom events here were cancelled.
  - Men's Slalom winner: (Italy) Lorenzo Dante Marco Gritti (2 times)
  - Women's Slalom winners: (Austria) Lisa Wusits (#1) / (Austria) Kristin Hetfleisch (#2)
- September 13 – 16: GSWC #6 (final) in (Italy) Sauris
  - Giant Slalom winners: (Switzerland) Stefan Portmann (m) / (Austria) Kristin Hetfleisch (f)
  - Slalom winners: (Italy) Lorenzo Dante Marco Gritti (m) / (Austria) Jacqueline Gerlach (f)
  - Super Combined winners: (Italy) Edoardo Frau (m) / (Austria) Jacqueline Gerlach (f)
  - Super G winners: (Switzerland) Stefan Portmann (m) / (Austria) Jacqueline Gerlach (f)

== Biathlon ==
=== International biathlon championships ===
- August 21 – 26, 2018: 2018 IBU Summer Biathlon World Championships in Nové Město na Moravě
  - Sprint winners: (Czech Republic) Michal Krčmář (m) / (Slovakia) Paulína Fialková (f)
  - Junior Sprint winners: (Czech Republic) Jakub Stvrtecky (m) / (Poland) Kamila Żuk (f)
  - Pursuit winners: (Czech Republic) Ondřej Moravec (m) / (Czech Republic) Veronika Vítková (f)
  - Junior Pursuit winners: (Russia) Viacheslav Maleev (m) / (Russia) Valeriia Vasnetcova (f)
  - Mixed Relay winners: Russia (Ekaterina Yurlova-Percht, Margarita Vasileva, Nikita Porshnev, & Yury Shopin)
  - Junior Mixed Relay winners: Czech Republic (Petra Sucha, Tereza Vobornikova, Jakub Stvrtecky, & Vitezslav Hornig)
- January 26 – February 3: 2019 IBU Youth/Junior World Championships in (Slovakia) Brezno-Osrblie
  - Junior Individual winners: (France) Martin Bourgeois Republique (m) / (China) MENG Fanqi (f)
  - Junior Sprint winners: (Norway) Vebjoern Soerum (m) / (Ukraine) Ekaterina Bekh (f)
  - Junior Pursuit winners: (Norway) Vebjoern Soerum (m) / (Ukraine) Ekaterina Bekh (f)
  - Junior Men's Relay winners: Russia (Said Karimulla Khalili, Ilnaz Mukhamedzianov, Vadim Istamgulov, & Vasilii Tomshin)
  - Junior Women's Relay winners: France (Camille Bened, Sophie Chauveau, & Lou Jeanmonnot)
  - Youth Individual winners: (Switzerland) Niklas Hartweg (m) / (Greenland) Ukaleq Astri Slettemark (f)
  - Youth Sprint winners: (Slovenia) Alex Cisar (m) / (Norway) Maren Bakken (f)
  - Youth Pursuit winners: (Slovenia) Alex Cisar (m) / (Switzerland) Amy Baserga (f)
  - Youth Men's Relay winners: Germany (Hendrik Rudolph, Darius Philipp Lodl, & Hans Koellner)
  - Youth Women's Relay winners: Norway (Maren Bakken, Marte Moeller, & Anne de Besche)
- February 18 – 24: 2019 IBU Open European Championships in (Belarus) Minsk-Raubichi
  - Individual winners: (Bulgaria) Krasimir Anev (m) / (Sweden) Hanna Öberg (f)
  - Sprint winners: (Norway) Tarjei Bø (m) / (Sweden) Mona Brorsson (f)
  - Pursuit winners: (Norway) Tarjei Bø (m) / (Russia) Ekaterina Yurlova-Percht (f)
  - Single Mixed Relay winners: Russia (Evgeniya Pavlova & Dmitry Malyshko)
  - Mixed Relay winners: Sweden (Emma Nilsson, Mona Brorsson, Martin Ponsiluoma, & Sebastian Samuelsson)
- March 4 – 10: 2019 IBU Junior Open European Championships in (Norway) Sjusjøen
  - Junior Individual winners: (Germany) Tim Grotian (m) / (France) Camille Bened (f)
  - Junior Sprint winners: (Norway) Sivert Guttorm Bakken (m) / (France) Camille Bened (f)
  - Junior Pursuit winners: (Germany) Julian Hollandt (m) / (Germany) Juliane Frühwirt (f)
  - Junior Single Mixed Relay winners: Russia (Ksenia Dovgaya & Igor Malinovskii)
  - Junior Mixed Relay winners: Russia (Anastasiia Goreeva, Alina Klevtsova, Aleksandr Bektuganov, & Said Karimulla Khalili)
- March 7 – 17: Biathlon World Championships 2019 in (Sweden) Östersund
  - Individual winners: (Germany) Arnd Peiffer (m) / (Sweden) Hanna Öberg (f)
  - Sprint winners: (Norway) Johannes Thingnes Bø (m) / (Slovakia) Anastasiya Kuzmina (f)
  - Pursuit winners: (Ukraine) Dmytro Pidruchnyi (m) / (Germany) Denise Herrmann (f)
  - Men's Relay winners: Norway (Lars Helge Birkeland, Vetle Sjåstad Christiansen, Tarjei Bø, & Johannes Thingnes Bø)
  - Women's Relay winners: Norway (Synnøve Solemdal, Ingrid Landmark Tandrevold, Tiril Eckhoff, Marte Olsbu Røiseland)
  - Single Mixed Relay winners: Norway (Marte Olsbu Røiseland & Johannes Thingnes Bø)
  - Mixed Relay winners: Norway (Marte Olsbu Røiseland, Tiril Eckhoff, Johannes Thingnes Bø, & Vetle Sjåstad Christiansen)
  - Mass Start winners: (Italy) Dominik Windisch (m) / (Italy) Dorothea Wierer (f)

=== 2018–19 Biathlon World Cup ===
- November 30 – December 9, 2018: BWC #1 in (Slovenia) Pokljuka
  - Individual winners: (France) Martin Fourcade (m) / (Ukraine) Yuliia Dzhima (f)
  - Pursuit winners: (Norway) Johannes Thingnes Bø (m) / (Finland) Kaisa Mäkäräinen (f)
  - Sprint winners: (Norway) Johannes Thingnes Bø (m) / (Finland) Kaisa Mäkäräinen (f)
  - Single Mixed Relay winners: Norway (Thekla Brun-Lie & Lars Helge Birkeland)
  - Mixed Relay winners: France (Anaïs Bescond, Justine Braisaz, Martin Fourcade, & Simon Desthieux)
- December 10 – 16, 2018: BWC #2 in (Austria) Hochfilzen
  - Pursuit winners: (France) Martin Fourcade (m) / (Finland) Kaisa Mäkäräinen (f)
  - Sprint winners: (Norway) Johannes Thingnes Bø (m) / (Italy) Dorothea Wierer (f)
  - Men's Relay winners: Sweden (Peppe Femling, Martin Ponsiluoma, Torstein Stenersen, & Sebastian Samuelsson)
  - Women's Relay winners: Italy (Lisa Vittozzi, Alexia Runggaldier, Dorothea Wierer, & Federica Sanfilippo)
- December 17 – 23, 2018: BWC #3 in (Czech Republic) Nové Město na Moravě
  - Pursuit winners: (Norway) Johannes Thingnes Bø (m) / (Norway) Marte Olsbu Røiseland (f)
  - Sprint winners: (Norway) Johannes Thingnes Bø (m) / (Norway) Marte Olsbu Røiseland (f)
  - Mass Start winners: (Norway) Johannes Thingnes Bø (m) / (Slovakia) Anastasiya Kuzmina (f)
- January 7 – 13: BWC #4 in (Germany) Oberhof
  - Pursuit winners: (Norway) Johannes Thingnes Bø (m) / (Italy) Lisa Vittozzi (f)
  - Sprint winners: (Russia) Alexandr Loginov (m) / (Italy) Lisa Vittozzi (f)
  - Men's Relay winners: Russia (Maxim Tsvetkov, Evgeniy Garanichev, Dmitry Malyshko, & Alexandr Loginov)
  - Women's Relay winners: Russia (Evgeniya Pavlova, Margarita Vasileva, Larisa Kuklina, & Ekaterina Yurlova-Percht)
- January 14 – 20: BWC #5 in (Germany) Ruhpolding
  - Sprint winners: (Norway) Johannes Thingnes Bø (m) / (Slovakia) Anastasiya Kuzmina (f)
  - Men's Relay winners: Norway (Lars Helge Birkeland, Vetle Sjåstad Christiansen, Tarjei Bø, & Johannes Thingnes Bø)
  - Women's Relay winners: France (Julia Simon, Anaïs Bescond, Justine Braisaz, & Anaïs Chevalier)
  - Mass Start winners: (Norway) Johannes Thingnes Bø (m) / (Germany) Franziska Preuß (f)
- January 21 – 27: BWC #6 in (Italy) Antholz-Anterselva
  - Pursuit winners: (Norway) Johannes Thingnes Bø (m) / (Italy) Dorothea Wierer (f)
  - Sprint winners: (Norway) Johannes Thingnes Bø (m) / (Czech Republic) Markéta Davidová (f)
  - Mass Start winners: (France) Quentin Fillon Maillet (m) / (Germany) Laura Dahlmeier (f)
- February 4 – 10: BWC #7 in (Canada) Canmore
  - Note: The men's and women's sprint events here were cancelled.
  - Short Individual winners: (Norway) Johannes Thingnes Bø (m) / (Norway) Tiril Eckhoff (f)
  - Men's Relay winners: Norway (Lars Helge Birkeland, Vetle Sjåstad Christiansen, Erlend Bjøntegaard, & Johannes Thingnes Bø)
  - Women's Relay winners: Germany (Vanessa Hinz, Franziska Hildebrand, Denise Herrmann, & Laura Dahlmeier)
- February 11 – 17: BWC #8 in (United States) Soldier Hollow
  - Sprint winners: (Norway) Vetle Sjåstad Christiansen (m) / (Norway) Marte Olsbu Røiseland (f)
  - Pursuit winners: (France) Quentin Fillon Maillet (m) / (Germany) Denise Herrmann (f)
  - Single Mixed Relay winners: Italy (Lukas Hofer & Dorothea Wierer)
  - Mixed Relay winners: France (Quentin Fillon Maillet, Simon Desthieux, Célia Aymonier, & Anaïs Chevalier)
- March 18 – 24: BWC #9 (final) in (Norway) Oslo-Holmenkollen
  - Sprint winners: (Norway) Johannes Thingnes Bø (m) / (Slovakia) Anastasiya Kuzmina (f)
  - Pursuit winners: (Norway) Johannes Thingnes Bø (m) / (Slovakia) Anastasiya Kuzmina (f)
  - Mass Start winners: (Norway) Johannes Thingnes Bø (m) / (Sweden) Hanna Öberg (f)

=== 2018–19 IBU Cup ===
- November 26 – December 2, 2018: IBU Cup #1 in (Sweden) Idre
  - Pursuit winners: (Germany) Philipp Nawrath (m) / (Russia) Svetlana Mironova (f)
  - Men's Sprint winners: (Russia) Anton Babikov (#1) / (France) Aristide Begue (#2)
  - Women's Sprint winners: (Sweden) Ingela Andersson (#1) / (Sweden) Elisabeth Högberg (#2)
- December 10 – 16, 2018: IBU Cup #2 in (Italy) Ridnaun-Val Ridanna
  - Pursuit winners: (Norway) Johannes Dale (m) / (Russia) Anastasiia Morozova (f)
  - Sprint winners: (Norway) Johannes Dale (m) / (Russia) Anastasiia Morozova (f)
  - Single Mixed Relay winners: Russia (Anastasiia Morozova & Sergey Korastylev)
  - Mixed Relay winners: Russia (Irina Kazakevich, Svetlana Mironova, Yury Shopin, & Anton Babikov)
- December 17 – 22, 2018: IBU Cup #3 in (Austria) Obertilliach
  - Individual winners: (France) Simon Fourcade (m) / (France) Caroline Colombo (f)
  - Sprint winners: (Norway) Sivert Guttorm Bakken (m) / (Canada) Nadia Moser (f)
  - Super Sprint winners: (Norway) Sindre Pettersen (m) / (Sweden) Felicia Lindqvist (f)
- January 7 – 13: IBU Cup #4 in (Poland) Duszniki-Zdrój
  - Men's Sprint winners: (Russia) Alexander Povarnitsyn (#1) / (Germany) Philipp Horn (#2)
  - Women's Sprint winner: (Russia) Natalia Gerbulova (2 times)
- January 14 – 20: IBU Cup #5 in (Germany) Großer Arber
  - Short Individual winners: (Russia) Alexander Povarnitsyn (m) / (Ukraine) Yuliya Zhuravok (f)
  - Sprint winners: (France) Aristide Begue (m) / (Russia) Victoria Slivko (f)
  - Pursuit winners: (Russia) Anton Babikov (m) / (Russia) Victoria Slivko (f)
- January 21 – 27: IBU Cup #6 in (Switzerland) Lenzerheide
  - Sprint winners: (France) Fabien Claude (m) / (Russia) Victoria Slivko (f)
  - Pursuit winners: (France) Fabien Claude (m) / (Russia) Uliana Kaisheva (f)
  - Single Mixed Relay winners: Russia (Sergey Korastylev & Uliana Kaisheva)
  - Mixed Relay winners: Russia (Anton Babikov, Alexey Slepov, Valeriia Vasnetcova, & Victoria Slivko)
- February 25 – March 2: IBU Cup #7 in (Estonia) Otepää
  - Super Sprint winners: (Norway) Endre Stroemsheim (m) / (Germany) Anna Weidel (f)
  - Sprint winners: (Germany) David Zobel (m) / (France) Chloe Chevalier (f)
- March 11 – 17: IBU Cup #8 (final) in (Italy) Martell-Val Martello
  - Men's Sprint winners: (Norway) Johannes Dale (#1) / (Germany) Lucas Fratzscher (#2)
  - Women's Sprint winners: (Ukraine) Olga Abramova (#1) / (France) Caroline Colombo (#2)
  - Mass Start winners: (France) Aristide Begue (m) / (France) Caroline Colombo (f)

=== 2018–19 IBU Junior Cup ===
- December 10 – 16, 2018: IBUJC #1 in (Switzerland) Lenzerheide
  - Junior Individual winners: (Italy) Patrick Braunhofer (m) / (France) Camille Bened (f)
  - Junior Sprint winners: (Russia) Viacheslav Maleev (m) / (France) Paula Botet (f)
- December 17 – 22, 2018: IBUJC #2 in Les Rousses
  - Junior Pursuit winners: (Russia) Said Karimulla Khalili (m) / (Germany) Juliane Frühwirt (f)
  - Junior Sprint winners: (Switzerland) Sebastian Stalder (m) / (Russia) Anastasiia Kaisheva (f)
  - Junior Single Mixed Relay winners: Slovenia (Alex Cisar & Nika Vindisar)
  - Junior Mixed Relay winners: France (Sebastien Mahon, Pierre Monney, Gilonne Guigonnat, & Paula Botet)
- February 25 – March 3: IBUJC #3 (final) in (Norway) Sjusjøen
  - Note: This event was supposed to be held in Torsby, but it was moved to the new location here.
  - Junior Men's Sprint winners: (Slovenia) Alex Cisar (#1) / (Germany) Tim Grotian (#2)
  - Junior Women's Sprint winners: (Sweden) Amanda Lundstroem (#1) / (Russia) Anastasiia Goreeva (#2)

== Cross-country skiing ==
=== International cross-country skiing events ===
- January 19 – 27: Part of the 2019 Nordic Junior World Ski Championships in (Finland) Lahti
  - Sprint Classical winners: (Russia) Alexander Terentev (m) / (Norway) Kristine Stavaas Skistad (f)
  - Freestyle winners: (France) Jules Chappaz (m) / (Sweden) Frida Karlsson (f)
  - Classical Mass Start winners: (Italy) Luca del Fabbro (m) / (Sweden) Frida Karlsson (f)
  - Men's Mass Start Relay winners: United States (Luke Jager, Ben Ogden, Johnny Hagenbuch, & Gus Schumacher)
  - Women's Mass Start Relay winners: Norway (Kristin Austgulen Fosnaes, Astrid Stav, Helene Marie Fossesholm, & Kristine Stavaas Skistad)
- February 19 – March 3: Part of the FIS Nordic World Ski Championships 2019 in (Austria) Seefeld
  - Sprint Freestyle winners: (Norway) Johannes Høsflot Klæbo (m) / (Norway) Maiken Caspersen Falla (f)
  - Skiathlon winners: (Norway) Sjur Røthe (m) / (Norway) Therese Johaug (f)
  - Men's Team Sprint Classical winners: Norway (Emil Iversen & Johannes Høsflot Klæbo)
  - Women's Team Sprint Classical winners: Sweden (Stina Nilsson & Maja Dahlqvist)
  - Classical winners: (Norway) Martin Johnsrud Sundby (m) / (Norway) Therese Johaug (f)
  - Men's 4×10 km Relay winners: Norway (Emil Iversen, Martin Johnsrud Sundby, Sjur Røthe, & Johannes Høsflot Klæbo)
  - Women's 4×5 km Relay winners: Sweden (Ebba Andersson, Frida Karlsson, Charlotte Kalla, & Stina Nilsson)
  - Freestyle Mass Start winners: (Norway) Hans Christer Holund (m) / (Norway) Therese Johaug (f)

=== 2018–19 Tour de Ski ===
- December 29 & 30, 2018: TdS #1 in (Italy) Toblach
  - Sprint Freestyle winners: (Norway) Johannes Høsflot Klæbo (m) / (Sweden) Stina Nilsson (f)
  - Freestyle winners: (Russia) Sergey Ustiugov (m) / (Russia) Natalya Nepryaeva (f)
- January 1: TdS #2 in (Switzerland) Val Müstair
  - Sprint Freestyle winners: (Norway) Johannes Høsflot Klæbo (m) / (Sweden) Stina Nilsson (f)
- January 2 & 3: TdS #3 in (Germany) Oberstdorf
  - Classical Mass Start winners: (Norway) Emil Iversen (m) / (Norway) Ingvild Flugstad Østberg (f)
  - Freestyle Pursuit winners: (Norway) Johannes Høsflot Klæbo (m) / (Norway) Ingvild Flugstad Østberg (f)
- January 5 & 6: TdS #4 (final) in (Italy) Fiemme Valley
  - Classical Mass Start winners: (Norway) Johannes Høsflot Klæbo (m) / (Norway) Ingvild Flugstad Østberg (f)
  - Final Climb winners: (Norway) Johannes Høsflot Klæbo (m) / (Norway) Ingvild Flugstad Østberg (f)

=== 2018–19 FIS Cross-Country World Cup ===
- Note: For the FIS page about these events, click here.
- November 24 & 25, 2018: CCWC #1 in (Finland) Ruka
  - Classical winners: (Russia) Alexander Bolshunov (m) / (Norway) Therese Johaug (f)
  - Sprint Classical winners: (Russia) Alexander Bolshunov (m) / (Russia) Yuliya Belorukova (f)
- November 30 – December 2, 2018: CCWC #2 in (Norway) Lillehammer
  - Freestyle winners: (Norway) Sjur Røthe (m) / (Norway) Therese Johaug (f)
  - Sprint Freestyle winners: (Italy) Federico Pellegrino (m) / (Sweden) Jonna Sundling (f)
  - Classical Pursuit winners: (Norway) Didrik Tønseth (m) / (Norway) Therese Johaug (f)
- December 8 & 9, 2018: CCWC #3 in Beitostølen
  - Freestyle winners: (Norway) Sjur Røthe (m) / (Norway) Therese Johaug (f)
  - Men's Mass Start Relay winners: Norway (Emil Iversen, Martin Johnsrud Sundby, Sjur Røthe, & Finn Hågen Krogh)
  - Women's Mass Start Relay winners: Norway (Heidi Weng, Therese Johaug, Ragnhild Haga, & Ingvild Flugstad Østberg)
- December 15 & 16, 2018: CCWC #4 in (Switzerland) Davos
  - Sprint Freestyle winners: (Norway) Johannes Høsflot Klæbo (m) / (Sweden) Stina Nilsson (f)
  - Freestyle winners: (Russia) Evgeniy Belov (m) / (Norway) Therese Johaug (f)
- January 12 & 13: CCWC #5 in (Germany) Dresden
  - Sprint Freestyle winners: (Norway) Sindre Bjørnestad Skar (m) / (Sweden) Stina Nilsson (f)
  - Men's Team Sprint Freestyle winners: Norway (Erik Valnes & Sindre Bjørnestad Skar)
  - Women's Team Sprint Freestyle winners: Sweden (Stina Nilsson & Maja Dahlqvist)
- January 19 & 20: CCWC #6 in (Estonia) Otepää
  - Sprint Classical winners: (Norway) Johannes Høsflot Klæbo (m) / (Norway) Maiken Caspersen Falla (f)
  - Classical winners: (Finland) Iivo Niskanen (m) / (Norway) Therese Johaug (f)
- January 26 & 27: CCWC #7 in (Sweden) Ulricehamn
  - Freestyle winners: (France) Maurice Manificat (m) / (Norway) Therese Johaug (f)
  - Men's Mass Start Relay winners: Russia (Evgeniy Belov, Alexander Bessmertnykh, Denis Spitsov, & Artem Maltsev)
  - Women's Mass Start Relay winners: Norway (Heidi Weng, Therese Johaug, Astrid Uhrenholdt Jacobsen, & Ingvild Flugstad Østberg)
- February 9 & 10: CCWC #8 in (Finland) Lahti
  - Sprint Freestyle winners: (Norway) Johannes Høsflot Klæbo (m) / (Norway) Maiken Caspersen Falla (f)
  - Men's Team Sprint Classical winners: Norway (Emil Iversen & Johannes Høsflot Klæbo)
  - Women's Team Sprint Classical winners: Sweden (Ida Ingemarsdotter & Maja Dahlqvist)
- February 16 & 17: CCWC #9 in (Italy) Cogne
  - Sprint Freestyle winners: (Italy) Federico Pellegrino (m) / (United States) Jessie Diggins (f)
  - Classical winners: (Russia) Alexander Bolshunov (m) / (Finland) Kerttu Niskanen (f)
- March 9 & 10: CCWC #10 in (Norway) Oslo
  - Classical Mass Start winners: (Russia) Alexander Bolshunov (m) / (Norway) Therese Johaug (f)
- March 12: CCWC #11 in (Norway) Drammen
  - Sprint Classical winners: (Norway) Johannes Høsflot Klæbo (m) / (Norway) Maiken Caspersen Falla (f)
- March 16 & 17: CCWC #12 in (Sweden) Falun
  - Sprint Freestyle winners: (Norway) Johannes Høsflot Klæbo (m) / (Sweden) Stina Nilsson (f)
  - Freestyle winners: (Russia) Alexander Bolshunov (m) / (Norway) Therese Johaug (f)
- March 22 – 24: CCWC #13 (final) in (Canada) Quebec City
  - Sprint Freestyle winners: (Norway) Johannes Høsflot Klæbo (m) / (Sweden) Stina Nilsson (f)
  - Classical Mass Start winners: (Norway) Johannes Høsflot Klæbo (m) / (Sweden) Stina Nilsson (f)
  - Freestyle Pursuit winners: (Norway) Johannes Høsflot Klæbo (m) / (Sweden) Stina Nilsson (f)

=== 2018–19 FIS Cross-Country Skiing Alpen Cup ===
- Note: For the FIS page about these events, click here.
- December 8 & 9, 2018: CCSAC #1 in (France) Prémanon
  - Event cancelled.
- December 21 – 23, 2018: CCSAC #2 in (Italy) Valdidentro-Isolaccia
  - Sprint Freestyle winners: (France) Richard Jouve (m) / (Switzerland) Laurien van der Graaff (f)
  - Freestyle winners: (Germany) Andreas Katz (m) / (Italy) Elisa Brocard (f)
  - Classical Mass Start winners: (France) Maurice Manificat (m) / (Germany) Antonia Fraebel (f)
- January 4 – 6: CCSAC #3 in (Czech Republic) Nové Město na Moravě
  - Sprint Classical winners: (France) Valentin Chauvin (m) / (Germany) Antonia Fraebel (f)
  - Freestyle winners: (France) Robin Duvillard (m) / (Germany) Antonia Fraebel (f)
  - Classical Mass Start winners: (France) Valentin Chauvin (m) / (Germany) Antonia Fraebel (f)
- February 8 – 10: CCSAC #4 in (Slovenia) Planica
  - Men's Sprint Freestyle winners: (France) Jules Chappaz (#1) / (Italy) Claudio Muller (#2)
  - Women's Sprint Freestyle winners: (Germany) Anna-Maria Dietze (#1) / (Italy) Ilaria Debertolis (#2)
  - Men's Classical winners: (France) Jules Chappaz (#1) / (Kazakhstan) Alexey Poltoranin (#2)
  - Women's Classical winners: (Germany) Lisa Lohmann (#1) / (Italy) Lucia Scardoni (#2)
  - Men's Freestyle Mass Start winners: (France) Jules Chappaz (#1) / (Austria) Max Hauke (#2)
  - Women's Freestyle Mass Start winners: (Czech Republic) Barbora Havlíčková (#1) / (Italy) Ilaria Debertolis (#2)
- March 2 & 3: CCSAC #5 in (Switzerland) Le Brassus
  - Freestyle winners: (France) Hugo Lapalus (m) / (France) Laura Chamiot Maitral (f)
  - Classical Pursuit winners: (France) Valentin Chauvin (m) / (Germany) Julia Belger (f)
- March 15 – 17: CCSAC #6 (final) in (Germany) Oberwiesenthal
  - Men's Sprint Freestyle winners: (Italy) Davide Graz (#1) / (Switzerland) Janik Riebli (#2)
  - Women's Sprint Freestyle winners: (Germany) Lisa Lohmann (#1) / (Czech Republic) Katerina Janatova (#2)
  - Men's Classical Mass Start winners: (Italy) Luca del Fabbro (#1) / (France) Valentin Chauvin (#2)
  - Women's Classical Mass Start winners: (Czech Republic) Barbora Havlíčková (#1) / (Germany) Antonia Fraebel (#2)
  - Freestyle Pursuit winners: (France) Clement Arnault (m) / (Czech Republic) Kateřina Razýmová (f)
  - Men's Freestyle Relay winners: France (Theo Schely, Victor Lovera, & Jules Chappaz)
  - Women's Freestyle Relay winners: Czech Republic (Pavlina Votockova, Zuzana Holikova, & Barbora Havlíčková)

=== 2018–19 FIS Cross-Country Skiing Eastern Europe Cup ===
- Note: For the FIS page about these events, click here.
- November 22 – 26, 2018: EEC #1 in (Russia) Vershina Tea
  - Sprint Classical winners: (Russia) Ilia Poroshkin (m) / (Russia) Olga Tsareva (f)
  - Sprint Freestyle winners: (Russia) Alexander Terentev (m) / (Russia) Olga Tsareva (f)
  - Classical winners: (Russia) Sergey Ardashev (m) / (Russia) Diana Golovan (f)
  - Freestyle winners: (Russia) Alexander Bessmertnykh (m) / (Russia) Anna Nechaevskaya (f)
- December 22 – 26, 2018: EEC #2 in (Russia) Krasnogorsk #1
  - Sprint Classical winners: (Russia) Ermil Vokuev (m) / (Russia) Natalia Matveeva (f)
  - Freestyle winners: (Russia) Ivan Yakimushkin (m) / (Russia) Tatiana Aleshina (f)
  - Sprint Freestyle winners: (Russia) Ivan Yakimushkin (m) / (Russia) Natalia Matveeva (f)
  - Classical winners: (Russia) Alexander Bessmertnykh (m) / (Russia) Alisa Zhambalova (f)
- January 10 – 13: EEC #3 in (Belarus) Raubichi
  - Sprint Classical winners: (Russia) Ilia Semikov (m) / (Belarus) Anastasia Kirillova (f)
  - Classical winners: (Russia) Ermil Vokuev (m) / (Russia) Alisa Zhambalova (f)
  - Freestyle winners: (Russia) Ilia Poroshkin (m) / (Russia) Alisa Zhambalova (f)
- February 8 – 10: EEC #4 in (Russia) Krasnogorsk #2
  - Classical winners: (Russia) Andrey Parfenov (m) / (Russia) Alisa Zhambalova (f)
  - Sprint Freestyle winners: (Russia) Andrey Parfenov (m) / (Russia) Anastasia Vlasova (f)
- February 23 – 27: EEC #5 (final) in (Russia) Syktyvkar
  - Classical winners: (Russia) Ilia Semikov (m) / (Russia) Yevgeniya Shapovalova (f)
  - Sprint Freestyle winners: (Russia) Andrey Parfenov (m) / (Russia) Aida Bayazitova (f)
  - Skiathlon winners: (Russia) Alexey Vitsenko (m) / (Russia) Svetlana Plotnikova (f)

=== 2018–19 FIS Cross-Country Skiing US Super Tour ===
- Note: For the FIS page about these events, click here.
- December 1 & 2, 2018: UST #1 in (Montana) Rendezvous Ski Trails (West Yellowstone)
  - Sprint Freestyle winners: (United States) Andrew Newell (m) / (United States) Julia Kern (f)
  - Freestyle winners: (United States) Benjamin Lustgarten (m) / (United States) Rosie Frankowski (f)
- January 25 – 27: UST #2 in (New York (state)) Mount Van Hoevenberg (Lake Placid)
  - Freestyle winners: (United States) Kyle Bratrud (m) / (Australia) Jessica Yeaton (f)
  - Sprint Classical winners: (Canada) Antoine Briand (m) / (United States) Sophie Caldwell (f)
  - Classical Mass Start winners: (United States) Kyle Bratrud (m) / (United States) Kaitlynn Miller (f)
- February 15 – 17: UST #3 in (Minnesota) Theodore Wirth Park (Minneapolis)
  - Sprint Freestyle winners: (Canada) Antoine Briand (m) / (United States) Alayna Sonnesyn (f)
  - Classical Mass Start winners: (United States) Zak Ketterson (m) / (United States) Kaitlynn Miller (f)
  - Freestyle winners: (United States) Matthew Edward Liebsch (m) / (United States) Nicole Schneider (f)
- March 28 – April 2: UST #4 (final) in (Maine) Presque Isle
  - Sprint Freestyle winners: (United States) Simi Hamilton (m) / (United States) Sadie Bjornsen (f)
  - Classical Mass Start winners: (United States) Erik Bjornsen (m) / (United States) Sadie Bjornsen (f)
  - Mass Start Mixed Relay winners:

=== 2018–19 FIS Cross-Country Skiing Nor-Am Cup ===
- Note: For the FIS page about these events, click here.
- December 8 & 9, 2018: SNAC #1 in (British Columbia) Vernon
  - Sprint Freestyle winners: (United States) Andrew Newell (m) / (United States) Julia Kern (f)
  - Classical winners: (United States) Kyle Bratrud (m) / (Canada) Katherine Stewart-Jones (f)
- December 13 – 16, 2018: SNAC #2 in (Alberta) Canmore Nordic Centre
  - Sprint Classical winners: (Canada) Bob Thompson (m) / (Canada) Dahria Beatty (f)
  - Freestyle winners: (Canada) Russell Kennedy (m) / (Canada) Dahria Beatty (f)
  - Classical Mass Start winners: (Canada) Bob Thompson (m) / (Canada) Dahria Beatty (f)
- January 18 – 20: SNAC #3 in (Quebec) Sherbrooke
  - Sprint Freestyle winners: (Canada) Russell Kennedy (m) / (f)
  - Classical winners: (Canada) Scott James Hill (m) / (Canada) Katherine Stewart-Jones (f)
  - Freestyle Mass Start winners: (Canada) Russell Kennedy (m) / (Canada) Katherine Stewart-Jones (f)
- February 1 – 3: SNAC #4 (final) in (Ontario) Duntroon
  - Sprint Classical winners: (Canada) Julien Locke (m) / (Canada) Zoe Williams (f)
  - Classical winners: (Canada) Alexis Dumas (m) / (Canada) Zoe Williams (f)
  - Freestyle Pursuit winners: (Canada) Jack Carlyle (m) / (Canada) Laura Leclair (f)

=== 2018–19 FIS Cross-Country Skiing Slavic Cup ===
- Note: For the FIS page about these events, click here.
- December 15 & 16, 2018: SSC #1 in (Slovakia) Štrbské Pleso #1
  - Classical winners: (Slovakia) Peter Mlynár (m) / (Poland) Justyna Kowalczyk (f)
  - Sprint Freestyle winners: (Poland) Paweł Klisz (m) / (Poland) Eliza Rucka (f)
- December 29 & 30, 2018: SSC #2 in (Slovakia) Štrbské Pleso #2
  - Freestyle winners: (Slovakia) Jan Koristek (m) / (Poland) Izabela Marcisz (f)
  - Classical winners: (Slovakia) Jan Koristek (m) / (Poland) Justyna Kowalczyk (f)
- February 2 & 3: SSC #3 in (Poland) Zakopane
  - Classical winners: (Slovakia) Jan Koristek (m) / (Poland) Justyna Kowalczyk (f)
  - Freestyle winners: (Slovakia) Jan Koristek (m) / (Poland) Izabela Marcisz (f)
- March 9 & 10: SSC #4 in (Poland) Wisła Kubalonka
  - Sprint Classical winners: (Poland) Maciej Staręga (m) / (Slovakia) Alena Procházková (f)
  - Freestyle winners: (Poland) Dominik Bury (m) / (Poland) Izabela Marcisz (f)
- March 23 & 24: SSC #5 (final) in (Slovakia) Kremnica-Skalksa
  - Classical winners: (Poland) Dominik Bury (m) / (Poland) Justyna Kowalczyk (f)
  - Freestyle Mass Start winners: (Poland) Dominik Bury (m) / (Poland) Izabela Marcisz (f)

=== 2018–19 FIS Cross-Country Skiing Far East Cup ===
- Note: For the FIS page about these events, click here.
- December 16 & 17, 2018: FEC #1 in (South Korea) Alpensia Cross-Country and Biathlon Centre #1
  - Classical winners: (Japan) Nobuhito Kashiwabara (m) / (Japan) Yukari Tanaka (f)
  - Freestyle winners: (Japan) Hikari Fujinoki (m) / (South Korea) Lee Chae-won (f)
- December 25 – 27, 2018: FEC #2 in (Japan) Otoineppu
  - Classical winners: (Japan) Naoto Baba (m) / (Japan) Chika Kobayashi (f)
  - Freestyle winners: (Japan) Naoto Baba (m) / (Japan) Miki Kodama (f)
- January 6 – 8: FEC #3, FEC #4, & FEC #5 in (Japan) Sapporo
  - Classical winners: (Japan) Takanori Ebina (m) / (Japan) Kozue Takizawa (f)
  - Sprint Freestyle winners: (Japan) Nobuhito Kashiwabara (m) / (Japan) Yuka Watanabe (f)
  - Freestyle winners: (Japan) Naoto Baba (m) / (Japan) Miki Kodama (f)
- January 16 & 17: FEC #6 in (South Korea) Alpensia Cross-Country and Biathlon Centre #2
  - Classical winners: (Japan) Hikari Fujinoki (m) / (Japan) Yukari Tanaka (f)
  - Freestyle winners: (Japan) Hikari Fujinoki (m) / (South Korea) Lee Chae-won (f)
- March 2 & 3: FEC #7 (final) in (Japan) Shiramine
  - Sprint Classical winners: (Japan) Hikari Fujinoki (m) / (Japan) Yukari Tanaka (f)
  - Sprint Freestyle winners: (Japan) Tomoki Sato (m) / (Japan) Yukari Tanaka (f)

=== 2018–19 FIS Cross-Country Skiing Scandinavian Cup ===
- Note: For the FIS page about these events, click here.
- December 14 – 16, 2018: CCSC #1 in (Sweden) Östersund
  - Note: The classical events here were cancelled.
  - Sprint Classical winners: (Norway) Paal Troean Aune (m) / (Norway) Anna Svendsen (f)
  - Freestyle winners: (Sweden) Daniel Rickardsson (m) / (Norway) Astrid Oeyre Slind (f)
- January 4 – 6: CCSC #2 in (Finland) Vuokatti
  - Sprint Freestyle winners: (Norway) Erik Valnes (m) / (Sweden) Johanna Hagström (f)
  - Classical winners: (Finland) Livo Niskanen (m) / (Sweden) Frida Karlsson (f)
  - Freestyle Mass Start winners: (Norway) Mattis Stenshagen (m) / (Sweden) Frida Karlsson (f)
- March 1 – 3: CCSC #3 (final) in (Latvia) Madona
  - Sprint Freestyle winners: (Norway) Gjoeran Tefre (m) / (Sweden) Moa Lundgren (f)
  - Classical winners: (Norway) Daniel Stock (m) / (Sweden) Johanna Hagström (f)
  - Freestyle Pursuit winners: (Norway) Martin Loewstroem Nyenget (m) / (Sweden) Moa Lundgren (f)

=== 2019 FIS Cross-Country Skiing Balkan Cup ===
- Note: For the FIS page about these events, click here.
- January 12 & 13: BC #1 in (Croatia) Ravna Gora
  - Event cancelled.
- February 2 & 3: BC #2 in (Greece) Pigadia
  - Men's Freestyle winner: (Bulgaria) Martin Penchev (2 times)
  - Women's Freestyle winner: (Croatia) Vedrana Malec (2 times)
- February 9 & 10: BC #3 in (Serbia) Sjenica
  - Men's Freestyle winner: (Bosnia and Herzegovina) Strahinja Eric (2 times)
  - Women's Freestyle winner: (Bosnia and Herzegovina) Sanja Kusmuk (2 times)
- February 13 & 14: BC #4 in (North Macedonia) Mavrovo
  - Note: The second men's and women's freestyle events here was cancelled.
  - Freestyle winners: (Croatia) Edi Dadić (m) / (Croatia) Vedrana Malec (f)
- March 2 & 3: BC #5 in (Croatia) Ravna Gora
  - Men's Classical & Freestyle winner: (Austria) Tobias Habenicht
  - Women's Classical & Freestyle winner: (Croatia) Nika Jagecic
- March 9 & 10: BC #6 in (Bosnia and Herzegovina) Dvorista
  - Men's Freestyle winner: (Croatia) Edi Dadić (2 times)
  - Women's Freestyle winner: (Croatia) Vedrana Malec (2 times)
- March 17 & 18: BC #7 in (Bulgaria) Borovets
  - Event cancelled.
- March 23 & 24: BC #8 (final) in (Turkey) Bolu-Gerede
  - Classical winners: (Romania) Paul Constantin Pepene (m) / (Croatia) Vedrana Malec (f)
  - Freestyle winners: (Romania) Petrică Hogiu (m) / (Croatia) Vedrana Malec (f)

=== 2018 FIS Cross-Country Skiing Australia & New Zealand Cup ===
- Note: For the FIS page about these events, click here.
- July 21 & 22: ANZC #1 in (Australia) Perisher Valley
  - Classical winners: (Australia) Phillip Bellingham (m) / (United States) Chelsea Moore (f)
  - Freestyle winners: (Australia) Callum Watson (m) / (Australia) Barbara Jezeršek (f)
- August 18 & 19: ANZC #2 in (Australia) Falls Creek
  - Sprint 1 km Freestyle winners: (Norway) Ole Jacob Forsmo (m) / (Australia) Emily Champion (f)
  - Classical winners: (Australia) Phillip Bellingham (m) / (Australia) Casey Wright (f)
- September 4 – 6: ANZC #3 (final) in (New Zealand) Snow Farm
  - Freestyle winners: (United States) Kyle Bratrud (m) / (United States) Jessie Diggins (f)
  - Sprint 1.6 km Freestyle winners: (United States) Kevin Bolger (m) / (United States) Sophie Caldwell (f)
  - Classical Mass Start winners: (United States) Benjamin Saxton (m) / (United States) Jessie Diggins (f)

== Freestyle skiing ==
=== World championships (Freestyle) ===
- August 24 – September 8, 2018: Part of the FIS Junior Freestyle Ski & Snowboard World Championships 2018 in (New Zealand) Cardrona Alpine Resort
  - Big Air winners: (United States) Mac Forehand (m) / (Russia) Anastasia Tatalina (f)
  - Ski Cross winners: (United Kingdom) Oliver Davies (m) / (Canada) Mikayla Martin (f)
  - Slopestyle winners: (Sweden) Oliwer Magnusson (m) / (Estonia) Kelly Sildaru (f)
  - Halfpipe winners: (New Zealand) Nico Porteous (m) / (Estonia) Kelly Sildaru (f)
- January 26 – April 14: FIS Junior Freestyle Ski & Snowboard World Championships 2019 (Freestyle) in (Switzerland) Leysin, (Austria) Reiteralm, (Italy) Chiesa in Valmalenco, & (Sweden) Klaeppen
  - Leysin (January 26 & 27)
  - Halfpipe winners: (United States) Connor Ladd (m) / (United Kingdom) Constance Brogden (f)
  - Reiteralm (March 28 & 29)
  - Ski Cross winners: (Sweden) David Mobaerg (m) / (Canada) Zoe Chore (f)
  - Chiesa in Valmalenco (April 1 – 6)
  - Aerials winners: (Belarus) Viachaslau Tsimertsau (m) / (Belarus) Sniazhana Drabiankova (f)
  - Moguls winners: (Russia) Nikita Novitckii (m) / (United States) Sabrina Cass (f)
  - Dual Moguls winners: (Canada) Elliot Vaillancourt (m) / (Russia) Anastasia Smirnova (f)
  - Klaeppen (April 4 – 14)
  - Slopestyle winners: (Canada) Edouard Therriault (m) / (Estonia) Kelly Sildaru (f)
  - Big Air winners: (Norway) Ulrik Samnoey (m) / (Estonia) Kelly Sildaru (f)
- February 1 – 10: Part of the FIS Freestyle Ski and Snowboarding World Championships 2019 in (United States) Park City, Deer Valley, & Solitude Mountain Resort
  - The women's slopestyle event here was cancelled.
  - Moguls winners: (Canada) Mikaël Kingsbury (m) / (Kazakhstan) Yuliya Galysheva (f)
  - Dual Moguls winners: (Canada) Mikaël Kingsbury (m) / (France) Perrine Laffont (f)
  - Aerials winners: (Russia) Maxim Burov (m) / (Belarus) Aliaksandra Ramanouskaya (f)
  - Team Aerials winners: Switzerland (Carol Bouvard, Nicolas Gygax, & Noé Roth)
  - Big Air winners: (Switzerland) Fabian Bösch (m) / (France) Tess Ledeux (f)
  - Halfpipe winners: (United States) Aaron Blunck (m) / (Estonia) Kelly Sildaru (f)
  - Men's Slopestyle winner: (United Kingdom) James Woods
  - Ski Cross winners: (France) François Place (m) / (Canada) Marielle Thompson (f)

=== 2018–19 FIS Freestyle Skiing World Cup ===
- September 5, 2018 – March 30, 2019: 2018–19 FIS Freestyle Skiing World Cup Schedule

==== Moguls and Aerials ====
- Note: For the FIS page about these events, click here.
- December 7, 2018: MAWC #1 in (Finland) Ruka
  - Moguls winners: (Canada) Mikaël Kingsbury (m) / (France) Perrine Laffont (f)
- December 15 & 16, 2018: MAWC #2 in (China) Thaiwoo (Chongli District, Zhangjiakou)
  - Moguls winners: (Canada) Mikaël Kingsbury (m) / (United States) Jaelin Kauf (f)
  - Dual Moguls winners: (Canada) Mikaël Kingsbury (m) / (United States) Jaelin Kauf (f)
- January 11 & 12: MAWC #3 in (Canada) Calgary
  - Moguls winners: (Canada) Mikaël Kingsbury (m) / (Kazakhstan) Yuliya Galysheva (f)
- January 17 – 19: MAWC #4 in (United States) Lake Placid
  - Moguls winners: (France) Benjamin Cavet (m) / (Australia) Jakara Anthony (f)
  - Aerials winners: (Russia) Maxim Burov (m) / (China) Xu Mengtao (f)
- January 26: MAWC #5 in (Canada) Mont Tremblant Resort
  - Moguls winners: (Canada) Mikaël Kingsbury (m) / (France) Perrine Laffont (f)
- February 16: MAWC #6 in (Russia) Moscow
  - Aerials winners: (Russia) Stanislav Nikitin (m) / (Belarus) Aliaksandra Ramanouskaya (f)
- February 23: MAWC #7 in (Belarus) Minsk
  - Aerials winners: (Russia) Maxim Burov (m) / (China) Xu Mengtao (f)
- February 23 & 24: MAWC #8 in (Japan) Tazawako
  - Moguls winners: (Canada) Mikaël Kingsbury (m) / (France) Perrine Laffont (f)
  - Dual Moguls winners: (Canada) Mikaël Kingsbury (m) / (France) Perrine Laffont (f)
- March 2 & 3: MAWC #9 (co-final) in (Kazakhstan) Shymbulak
  - Note: The men's and women's dual moguls events here were cancelled.
  - Moguls winners: (Japan) Ikuma Horishima (m) / (Kazakhstan) Yuliya Galysheva (f)
- March 2 & 3: MAWC #10 (co-final) in Shimao Lotus Mountain
  - Men's Aerials winner: (China) Sun Jiaxu (2 times)
  - Women's Aerials winners: (Australia) Laura Peel (#1) / (China) Xu Mengtao (#2)
  - Team Aerials winners: China

==== Half-pipe, Big air, and Slopestyle ====
- Note: For the FIS page about these events, click here.
- September 5 – 7, 2018: HB&SWC #1 in (New Zealand) Cardrona Alpine Resort
  - Big Air winners: (Switzerland) Andri Ragettli (m) / (Canada) Elena Gaskell (f)
- November 4, 2018: HB&SWC #2 in (Italy) Modena SKIPASS
  - Big Air winners: (Norway) Birk Ruud (m) / (Switzerland) Mathilde Gremaud (f)
- November 22 – 24, 2018: HB&SWC #3 in (Austria) Stubai Alps
  - Slopestyle winners: (Sweden) Henrik Harlaut (m) / (Estonia) Kelly Sildaru (f)
- December 5 & 7, 2018: HB&SWC #4 in (United States) Copper Mountain
  - Halfpipe winners: (United States) Aaron Blunck (m) / (Estonia) Kelly Sildaru (f)
- December 20 – 22, 2018: HB&SWC #5 in (China) Genting Resort Secret Garden (Chongli District. Zhangjiakou)
  - Halfpipe winners: (Canada) Simon d'Artois (m) / (China) Zhang Kexin (f)
- January 10 – 12: HB&SWC #6 in (France) Font-Romeu
  - Slopestyle winners: (United States) Alex Hall (m) / (Switzerland) Sarah Höfflin (f)
- January 25 – 27: HB&SWC #7 in (Italy) Seiser Alm
  - Slopestyle winners: (Canada) Max Moffatt (m) / (United States) Eileen Gu (f)
- February 14 – 16: HB&SWC #8 in (Canada) Calgary
  - Halfpipe winners: (United States) David Wise (m) / (Canada) Cassie Sharpe (f)
- March 6 – 9: HB&SWC #9 in (United States) Mammoth Mountain Ski Area
  - Halfpipe winners: (United States) Birk Irving (m) / (Canada) Cassie Sharpe (f)
  - Slopestyle winners: (United States) Mac Forehand (m) / (Switzerland) Mathilde Gremaud (f)
- March 14 – 17: HB&SWC #10 in (Canada) Quebec City
  - Note: The slopestyle events here was cancelled.
  - Big Air winners: (Austria) Lukas Müllauer (m) / (Switzerland) Mathilde Gremaud (f)
- March 20 & 21: HB&SWC #11 in (France) Tignes
  - Event cancelled.
- March 23: HB&SWC #12 in (Norway) Oslo
  - Event cancelled.
- March 29 & 30: HB&SWC #13 (final) in (Switzerland) Silvaplana
  - Slopestyle winners: (Switzerland) Andri Ragettli (m) / (Canada) Megan Oldham (f)

==== Ski cross ====
- Note: For the FIS page about these events, click here.
- December 6 – 8, 2018: SCWC #1 in (France) Val Thorens
  - Event cancelled.
- December 13 – 15, 2018: SCWC #2 in (Austria) Montafon
  - Event cancelled.
- December 16 & 17, 2018: SCWC #3 in (Switzerland) Arosa
  - Ski Cross winners: (Switzerland) Jonas Lenherr (m) / (Switzerland) Fanny Smith (f)
- December 20 – 22, 2018: SCWC #4 in (Italy) Innichen
  - Men's Ski Cross winners: (France) Jonathan Midol (#1) / (Switzerland) Joos Berry (#2)
  - Women's Ski Cross winners: (Switzerland) Fanny Smith (#1) / (Sweden) Sandra Näslund (#2)
- January 18 – 20: SCWC #5 in (Sweden) Idre
  - Men's Ski Cross winners: (Switzerland) Alex Fiva (#1) / (France) Jean-Frédéric Chapuis (#2)
  - Women's Ski Cross winners: (Germany) Heidi Zacher (#1) / (Switzerland) Fanny Smith (#2)
- January 25 & 26: SCWC #6 in (Canada) Blue Mountain
  - Ski Cross winners: (Canada) Brady Leman (m) / (Switzerland) Fanny Smith (f)
- February 15 – 17: SCWC #7 in (Germany) Feldberg
  - Men's Ski Cross winners: (Switzerland) Ryan Regez (#1) / (France) Jean-Frédéric Chapuis (#2)
  - Women's Ski Cross winner: (Sweden) Sandra Näslund (2 times)
- February 22 – 24: SCWC #8 in (Russia) Sunny Valley Ski Resort (Miass)
  - Men's Ski Cross winner: (France) Bastien Midol (2 times)
  - Women's Ski Cross winner: (Switzerland) Fanny Smith (2 times)
- March 17: SCWC #9 (final) in (Switzerland) Veysonnaz
  - Ski Cross winners: (France) Jean-Frédéric Chapuis (m) / (Canada) Marielle Thompson (f)

=== 2018–19 FIS Freestyle Skiing Europa Cup ===
- Note: For the FIS page about these events, click here.
- November 2018
  - November 24 & 25, 2018: FSEC #1 in (Austria) Pitztal
    - Ski Cross winners: (Switzerland) Jonas Lenherr (m) / (Canada) Marielle Thompson (f)
  - November 30 & December 1, 2018: FSEC #2 in (Finland) Ruka
    - Men's Aerials winners: (Switzerland) Noé Roth (#1) / (Switzerland) Dimitri Isler (#2)
    - Women's Aerials winners: (Japan) Iori Usui (#1) / (Australia) Laura Peel (#2)
- January 2019
  - January 11: FSEC #3 in (Switzerland) Villars-sur-Ollon
    - Ski Cross winners: (Switzerland) Romain Detraz (m) / (Switzerland) Fanny Smith (f)
  - January 16 & 17: FSEC #4 in (Austria) Kreischberg
    - Slopestyle winners: (Austria) Hannes Rudigier (m) / (Spain) Maialen Oiartzabal (f; default)
    - Big Air winners: (Finland) Kuura Koivisto (m) / (Spain) Maialen Oiartzabal (f; default)
  - January 17 – 19: FSEC #5 in (France) Val Thorens
    - Men's Ski Cross winners: (France) Youri Duplessis Kergomard (#1) / (Switzerland) Gil Martin (#2)
    - Women's Ski Cross winner: (France) Amelie Schneider (2 times)
  - January 20 – 23: FSEC #6 in (France) Vars
    - Slopestyle winners: (Switzerland) Nils Rhyner (m) / (France) Lou Barin (f)
  - January 24 – 26: FSEC #7 in (Switzerland) Lenk im Simmental
    - Men's Ski Cross winner: (Switzerland) Niki Lehikoinen (2 times)
    - Women's Ski Cross winner: (Austria) Katrin Ofner (2 times)
  - January 26 & 27: FSEC #8 in (Russia) Moscow
    - Men's Aerials winners: (Belarus) Ilya Harelik (#1) / (Russia) Ruslan Katmanov (#2)
    - Women's Aerials winner: (Belarus) Sniazhana Drabiankova (2 times)
  - January 26 & 27: FSEC #9 in (Austria) St Anton am Arlberg
    - Slopestyle winners: (Finland) Simo Peltola (m) / (Czech Republic) Ruzena Cermakova (f; default)
    - Big Air winners: (Czech Republic) Matej Svancer (m) / (Czech Republic) Ruzena Cermakova (f; default)
  - January 26 & 27: FSEC #8 in (Russia) Krasnoe Ozero
    - Event cancelled.
  - January 31 – February 2: FSEC #11 in (France) Saint François Longchamp
    - Note: The second ski cross events for men and women here were cancelled.
    - Ski Cross winners: (France) Youri Duplessis Kergomard (m) / (France) Amelie Schneider (f)
- February 2019
  - February 1 & 2: FSEC #12 in (Finland) Taivalvaara
    - Moguls winners: (Russia) Viacheslav Tcvetkov (m) / (Russia) Anna Gerasimova (f)
    - Dual moguls winners: (Russia) Maxim Kudryavtsev (m) / (Russia) Anna Gerasimova (f)
  - February 5 & 6: FSEC #13 in (Finland) Jyväskylä
    - Moguls winners: (Finland) Miska Mustonen (m) / (United States) Lulu Shaffer (f)
    - Dual moguls winners: (Finland) Johannes Suikkari (m) / (Russia) Anna Gerasimova (f)
  - February 5 – 7: FSEC #14 in (France) La Clusaz
    - Slopestyle winners: (Finland) Kuura Koivisto (m) / (France) Lou Barin (f)
  - February 9 & 10: FSEC #15 in (Germany) Grasgehren
    - Note: The second ski cross events for men and women were cancelled.
    - Ski Cross winners: (Germany) Florian Wilmsmann (m) / (Germany) Heidi Zacher (f)
  - February 9 & 10: FSEC #16 in (Sweden) Bygdsiljum
    - Moguls winners: (Finland) Johannes Suikkari (m) / (France) Fantine Degroote (f)
    - Dual moguls winners: (Sweden) Albin Holmgren (m) / (Sweden) My Bjerkman (f)
  - February 15 – 17: FSEC #17 in (Belarus) Minsk
    - Men's Aerials winners: (Belarus) Ihar Drabiankou (#1) / (Belarus) Makar Mitrafanau (#2)
    - Women's Aerials winner: (Belarus) Sniazhana Drabiankova (2 times)
    - Team Aerials winners:
  - February 16: FSEC #18 in (Poland) Kotelnica Bialczanska
    - Big Air winners: (Austria) Hannes Rudigier (m) / (Norway) Elvira Marie Ros (f)
  - February 22 & 23: FSEC #19 in (Switzerland) Davos
    - Big Air winners: (Switzerland) Kim Gubser (m) / (Germany) Kea Kühnel (f)
  - February 23: FSEC #20 in (Czech Republic) Deštné v Orlických horách
    - Slopestyle winners: (Ukraine) Orest Kovalenko (m) / (Norway) Tora Johansen (f)
- March 2019
  - March 1: FSEC #21 in (Czech Republic) Dolní Morava
    - Ski Cross winners: (Switzerland) Ryan Regez (m) / (Russia) Ekaterina Maltseva (f)
  - March 2 & 3: FSEC #22 in (Austria) Krispl
    - Event cancelled.
  - March 12 & 13: FSEC #23 in (France) Tignes
    - Moguls winners: (France) Nicolas Degaches (m) / (Sweden) Josefina Wersen (f)
    - Dual Moguls winners: (France) Nicolas Degaches (m) / (Sweden) My Bjerkman (f)
  - March 15 – 18: FSEC #24 in (Georgia (country)) Gudauri
    - Men's Ski Cross winners: (Russia) Igor Omelin (#1) / (France) Youri Duplessis Kergomard (#2)
    - Women's Ski Cross winners: (Russia) Ekaterina Maltseva (#1) / (Canada) Mikayla Martin (#2)
  - March 16 & 17: FSEC #25 in (Slovakia) Jasná
    - Slopestyle winners: (Czech Republic) Vojtěch Bresky (m) / (Ukraine) Kateryna Kotsar (f)
  - March 17 – 19: FSEC #26 in (Switzerland) Airolo #1
    - Moguls winners: (United Kingdom) Thomas Gerken Schofield (m) / (Sweden) My Bjerkman (f)
    - Men's Dual Moguls winners: (United Kingdom) Thomas Gerken Schofield (#1) / (Finland) Miska Mustonen (#2)
    - Women's Dual Moguls winners: (Sweden) Thea Wallberg (#1) / (United Kingdom) Makayla Gerken Schofield (#2)
  - March 21 – 24: FSEC #27 in (Austria) Reiteralm
    - Men's Ski Cross winners: (Germany) Cornel Renn (#1) / (Germany) Tobias Müller (#2)
    - Women's Ski Cross winner: (Canada) India Sherret (2 times)
  - March 22 & 23: FSEC #28 in (Germany) Goetschen
    - Big Air winners: (Finland) Simo Peltola (m) / (Norway) Tora Johansen (f)
  - March 22 – 24: FSEC #29 in (Switzerland) Airolo #2
    - Men's Aerials winner: (Switzerland) Noé Roth (2 times)
    - Women's Aerials winners: (Belarus) Sniazhana Drabiankova (#1) / (Belarus) Volha Chromova (#2)
    - Team Aerials winners:
  - March 25 & 26: FSEC #30 in (Italy) Livigno
    - Men's Slopestyle winners: (Switzerland) Kim Gubser (#1) / (Czech Republic) Matej Svancer (#2)
    - Women's Slopestyle winners: (United Kingdom) Kirsty Muir (#1) / (Italy) Elisa Maria Nakab (#2)
  - March 31 & April 1: FSEC #31 (final) in (Italy) Chiesa in Valmalenco
    - Men's Aerials winner: (Switzerland) Noé Roth (2 times)
    - Women's Aerials winners: (Belarus) Sniazhana Drabiankova (#1) / (United States) Karyl Loeb (#2)

=== 2018–19 FIS Freestyle Skiing Nor-Am Cup ===
- Note: For the FIS page about these events, click here.
- December 2018
  - December 14 & 15, 2018: FSNA #1 in (Colorado) Copper Mountain
    - Men's Halfpipe winners: (United States) Cassidy Jarrell (#1) / (Canada) Sam McKeown (#2)
    - Women's Halfpipe winner: (United Kingdom) Zoe Atkin (2 times)
- January 2019
  - January 5 & 6: FSNA #2 in Utah Olympic Park
    - Men's Aerials winners: (United States) Jonathon Lillis (#1) / (United States) Christopher Lillis (#2)
    - Women's Aerials winners: (Ukraine) Olga Polyuk (#1) / (United States) Madison Varmette (#2)
  - January 17 & 18: FSNA #3 in (New Hampshire) Waterville Valley Resort
    - Men's Slopestyle winners: (United States) Deven Fagan (#1) / (United States) Hunter Henderson (#2)
    - Women's Slopestyle winners: (United States) Marin Hamill (#1) / (Canada) Skye Clarke (#2)
  - January 17 – 20: FSNA #4 in (Ontario) Calabogie Peaks #1
    - Men's Ski Cross winners: (Canada) Gavin Rowell (#1) / (Canada) Jared Schmidt (#2)
    - Women's Ski Cross winner: (Canada) Zoe Chore (2 times)
  - January 27 – 29: FSNA #5 in (New York (state)) Lake Placid
    - Note: The second aerials events for men and women were cancelled.
    - Aerials winners: (Switzerland) Noé Roth (m) / (Australia) Brittany George (f)
- February 2019
  - February 1 & 2: FSNA #6 in (Ontario) Calabogie Peaks #2
    - Men's Ski Cross winner: (Canada) Jared Schmidt (2 times)
    - Women's Ski Cross winner: (Canada) Zoe Chore (2 times)
  - February 1 & 2: FSNA #7 in (Quebec) Le Relais #1
    - Men's Aerials winners: (Canada) Miha Fontaine (#1) / (United States) Quinn Dehlinger (#2)
    - Women's Aerials winner: (United States) Megan Smallhouse (2 times)
  - February 2 & 3: FSNA #8 in (Vermont) Stratton Mountain Resort
    - Moguls winners: (United States) George McQuinn (m) / (United States) Kasey Hogg (f)
    - Dual moguls winners: (Japan) Sō Matsuda (m) / (United States) Kenzie Radway (f)
  - February 8 – 10: FSNA #9 in (Alberta) Calgary
    - Halfpipe winners: (United States) Hunter Hess (m) / (United States) Svea Irving (f)
    - Slopestyle winners: (Canada) Étienne Geoffroy Gagnon (m) / (United States) Marin Hamill (f)
  - February 9 & 10: FSNA #10 in (Quebec) Val Saint-Côme
    - Moguls winners: (United States) Alex Lewis (m) / (United States) Ali Kariotis (f)
    - Dual moguls winners: (Canada) Gabriel Dufresne (m) / (Canada) Florence Delsame (f)
  - February 14 – 16: FSNA #11 in (Colorado) Aspen/Snowmass
    - Note: The women's big air event here was cancelled.
    - Slopestyle winners: (Canada) Rylan Evans (m) / (Canada) Megan Oldham (f)
    - Men's Big Air winner: (United States) Ryan Stevenson
    - Halfpipe winners: (United States) Samson Schuiling (m) / (United Kingdom) Zoe Atkin (f)
  - February 18 – 23: FSNA #12 in (Colorado) Ski Cooper
    - Men's Ski Cross winners: (Canada) Gavin Rowell (#1) / (Canada) Carson Cook (#2)
    - Women's Ski Cross winners: (Canada) Zoe Chore (#1) / (Canada) Hannah Schmidt (#2)
  - February 21 – 24: FSNA #13 in (Colorado) Steamboat Ski Resort
    - Moguls winners: (United States) Jack Kariotis (m) / (United States) Kai Owens (f)
    - Dual moguls winners: (Canada) Elliot Vaillancourt (m) / (United States) Kenzie Radway (f)
- March & April 2019
  - March 2 & 3: FSNA #14 in (British Columbia) Apex Mountain Resort
    - Moguls winners: (United States) Nick Page (m) / (Japan) Shunka Fukushima (f)
    - Dual moguls winners: (Japan) Sō Matsuda (m) / (United States) Kai Owens (f)
  - March 12 – 17: FSNA #15 in (New York (state)) Holiday Valley
    - Men's Ski Cross winner: (Canada) Phillip Tremblay (2 times)
    - Women's Ski Cross winners: (#1) / (#2)
  - March 16 & 17: FSNA #16 in (California) Mammoth Mountain Ski Area
    - Halfpipe winners: (United States) Dylan Ladd (m) / (United States) Svea Irving (f)
    - Slopestyle winners: (United States) Hunter Henderson (m) / (United States) Marin Hamill (f)
  - March 26: FSNA #17 in (Quebec) Stoneham Mountain Resort
    - Halfpipe winners: (United States) Jaxin Hoerter (m) / (United States) Svea Irving (f)
  - March 29 & 30: FSNA #18 in (Quebec) Le Relais #2
    - Slopestyle winners: (United States) Hunter Henderson (m) / (Canada) Amy Fraser (f)
  - April 13 & 14: FSNA #19 (final) in (Alberta) Banff Sunshine
    - Men's Ski Cross winners: (Canada) Reece Howden (#1) / (Canada) Brady Leman (#2)
    - Women's Ski Cross winner: (Canada) Kelsey Serwa (2 times)

=== 2018 FIS Freestyle Skiing South American Cup ===
- Note: For the FIS page about these events, click here.
- August 3 – 5: SAC #1 in (Chile) La Parva #1
  - Note: The second Women's slopestyle event was cancelled.
  - Men's Slopestyle winner: (Argentina) Mateo Bonacalza (2 times)
  - Women's Slopestyle winner: (Chile) Dominique Ohaco
- August 10 – 12: SAC #2 in (Chile) La Parva #2
  - Men's Ski Cross winner: (Chile) Joaquin Valdes (2 times)
  - Women's Ski Cross winner: (Chile) Saga Goni (2 times)
- September 14 & 15: SAC #3 in (Argentina) Cerro Catedral
  - Men's Big Air winner: (United States) Luke Price (2 times)
  - Women's Big Air winners: (Argentina) Abril Melisa Bertzky (#1) / (Argentina) Josefina Vitiello (#2)
- September 18 – 20: SAC #4 (final) in (Argentina) Cerro Castor
  - Big Air winners: (United States) Luke Price (m) / (Argentina) Josefina Vitiello (f)
  - Slopestyle winners: (Argentina) Ivan Kuray (m) / (Argentina) Josefina Vitiello (f)

=== 2018 FIS Freestyle Skiing Australia & New Zealand Cup ===
- Note: For the FIS page about these events, click here.
- August 14 – 16: ANCFS #1 in (New Zealand) Cardrona Alpine Resort
  - Slopestyle winners: (Japan) Taisei Yamamoto (m) / (United States) Eileen Gu (f)
  - Half-pipe winners: (United Kingdom) Sam Ward (m) / (United Kingdom) Zoe Atkin (f)
- August 15 – 18: ANCFS #2 in (Australia) Falls Creek
  - Men's Ski Cross winner: (United Kingdom) Oliver Davies (2 times)
  - Women's Ski Cross winner: (Australia) Sami Kennedy-Sim (2 times)
- August 28 & 29: ANCFS #3 in (Australia) Perisher Ski Resort
  - Men's Moguls winners: (Canada) Mikaël Kingsbury (#1) / (Japan) Ikuma Horishima (#2)
  - Women's Moguls winner: (Japan) Junko Hoshino (#1) / (Australia) Jakara Anthony (#2)
- September 1: ANCFS #4 in (Australia) Mount Buller Alpine Resort
  - Dual Moguls winners: (Australia) James Matheson (m) / (Australia) Jakara Anthony (f)
- September 3 – 6: ANCFS #5 (final) in (Australia) Mount Hotham
  - Men's Ski Cross winners: (Australia) Douglas Crawford (#1) / (Australia) Robbie Morrison (#2)
  - Women's Ski Cross winner: (Australia) Sami Kennedy-Sim (2 times)

== Nordic combined ==
=== International Nordic combined events ===
- January 19 – 27: Part of the 2019 Nordic Junior World Ski Championships in (Finland) Lahti
  - Men's individual winners: (Germany) Julian Schmid (#1) / (Austria) Johannes Lamparter (#2)
  - Women's individual winner: (Japan) Ayane Miyazaki
  - Men's team winners: Germany (Luis Lehnert, Simon Huettel, David Mach, & Julian Schmid)
- February 20 – March 3: Part of the FIS Nordic World Ski Championships 2019 in (Austria) Seefeld
  - Men's individual winners: (Germany) Eric Frenzel (#1) / (Norway) Jarl Magnus Riiber (#2)
  - Men's team winners: Norway (Espen Bjørnstad, Jan Schmid, Jørgen Graabak, & Jarl Magnus Riiber)
  - Men's team sprint winners: Germany (Eric Frenzel & Fabian Rießle)

=== 2018–19 FIS Nordic Combined World Cup ===
- Note: For the FIS page about these events, click here.
- November 23 – 25, 2018: NCWC #1 in (Finland) Ruka
  - Men's individual winner: (Austria) Mario Seidl
  - Men's team winners: Germany (Eric Frenzel, Fabian Rießle, Johannes Rydzek, & Vinzenz Geiger)
- November 29 – December 2, 2018: NCWC #2 in (Norway) Lillehammer
  - Men's individual winner: (Norway) Jarl Magnus Riiber (2 times)
  - Men's Mass Start winner: (Norway) Jarl Magnus Riiber
- December 21 – 23, 2018: NCWC #3 in (Austria) Ramsau am Dachstein
  - Men's individual winners: (Norway) Jarl Magnus Riiber (#1) / (Norway) Jørgen Graabak (#2)
- January 4 – 6: NCWC #4 in (Estonia) Otepää
  - Men's individual winner: (Norway) Jarl Magnus Riiber (2 times)
- January 10 – 13: NCWC #5 in (Italy) Fiemme Valley
  - Men's individual winners: (Germany) Johannes Rydzek (#1) / (Germany) Vinzenz Geiger (#2)
  - Men's team winners: Norway (Jan Schmid & Jørgen Graabak)
- January 17 – 20: NCWC #6 in (France) Chaux-Neuve
  - Men's individual winners: (Austria) Franz-Josef Rehrl (#1; 2 times) / (Austria) Mario Seidl (#2)
- January 25 – 27: NCWC #7 in (Norway) Trondheim
  - Men's individual winner: (Norway) Jarl Magnus Riiber (2 times)
- February 1 – 3: NCWC #8 in (Germany) Klingenthal
  - Men's individual winner: (Norway) Jarl Magnus Riiber (2 times)
- February 8 – 10: NCWC #9 in Lahti
  - Men's individual winner: (Norway) Jørgen Graabak
  - Men's team winners: Finland (Ilkka Herola & Eero Hirvonen)
- March 8 & 9: NCWC #10 in (Norway) Oslo
  - Men's individual winner: (Norway) Jarl Magnus Riiber
- March 15 – 17: NCWC #11 (final) in (Germany) Schonach im Schwarzwald
  - Men's individual winners: (Austria) Bernhard Gruber (#1) / (Norway) Jarl Magnus Riiber (#2)

=== 2018–19 FIS Nordic Combined Continental Cup ===
- Note: For the FIS page about these events, click here.
- December 14 & 15, 2018: CCNC #1 in (United States) Steamboat Ski Resort
  - Men's individual winners: (United States) Taylor Fletcher (#1) / (Austria) Paul Gerstgraser (#2)
  - Women's individual winner: (United States) Tara Geraghty-Moats (2 times)
- December 19 & 20, 2018: CCNC #2 in (United States) Utah Olympic Park
  - Men's individual winners: (Italy) Lukas Runggaldier (#1) / (United States) Taylor Fletcher (#2)
  - Women's individual winners: (United States) Tara Geraghty-Moats (#1) / (Norway) Gyda Westvold Hansen (#2)
- January 4 – 6: CCNC #3 in (Germany) Klingenthal
  - Note: The men's team event here was cancelled.
  - Men's individual winner: (Norway) Jens Lurås Oftebro (2 times)
- January 5 & 6: CCNC #4 in (Estonia) Otepää
  - Women's individual winner: (United States) Tara Geraghty-Moats (2 times)
- January 11 – 13: CCNC #5 in (Finland) Ruka
  - Men's individual winner: (Norway) Leif Torbjoern Naesvold
  - Men's team winners: Norway (Simen Tiller, Sindre Ure Soetvik, Harald Johnas Riiber, & Leif Torbjoern Naesvold)
  - Men's Mass Start winner: (Norway) Leif Torbjoern Naesvold
- January 26 & 27: CCNC #6 in (Slovenia) Planica
  - Men's individual winners: (Norway) Leif Torbjoern Naesvold (#1) / (Austria) Paul Gerstgraser (#2)
- February 8 – 10: CCNC #7 in Eisenerz
  - Men's individual winners: (Austria) Paul Gerstgraser (2 times)
  - Men's team winners: Austria (Philipp Orter, Christian Deuschl, Florian Dagn, & Paul Gerstgraser)
- February 16 & 17: CCNC #8 in (Norway) Rena
  - Men's individual winner: (Austria) Paul Gerstgraser (2 times)
  - Women's individual winner: (United States) Tara Geraghty-Moats (2 times)
- March 8 – 10: CCNC #9 (final) in (Russia) Nizhny Tagil
  - Men's individual winners: (Germany) Luis Lehnert (#1) / (Austria) Thomas Joebstl (#2)
  - Women's individual winner: (United States) Tara Geraghty-Moats (2 times)
  - Mass Start winners: (Austria) Thomas Joebstl (m) / (United States) Tara Geraghty-Moats (f)

=== 2018–19 FIS Nordic Combined Alpen Cup ===
- Note: For the FIS page about these events, click here.
- August 6, 2018: ACNC #1 in (Germany) Klingenthal
  - Women's individual winner: (Italy) Daniela Dejori
- August 10, 2018: ACNC #2 in (Germany) Bischofsgrün
  - Women's individual winner: (Austria) Lisa Hirner
- September 8 – 10, 2018: ACNC #3 in (Germany) Winterberg
  - Men's individual winners: (Slovenia) Rok Jelen (#1) / (Austria) Manuel Einkemmer (#2)
- October 5 – 7, 2018: ACNC #4 in (Italy) Fiemme Valley-Predazzo
  - Men's individual winners: (Germany) David Mach (#1) / (Austria) Johannes Lamparter (#2)
  - Women's individual winners: (Germany) Jenny Nowak (#1) / (Austria) Lisa Hirner (#2)
- December 21 – 23, 2018: ACNC #5 in (Austria) Villach
  - Men's individual winners: (Germany) Luis Lehnert (#1) / (Austria) Thomas Rettenegger (#2)
  - Women's individual winner: (Austria) Lisa Hirner (2 times)
- January 12 & 13: ACNC #6 in (Germany) Schonach im Schwarzwald
  - Men's individual winners: (France) Edgar Vallet (#1) / (Austria) Max Teeling (#2)
  - Women's individual winners: (Slovenia) Ema Volavsek (#1) / (Italy) Annika Sieff (#2)
- February 8 – 10: ACNC #7 in (Switzerland) Kandersteg
  - Men's individual winners: (Austria) Severin Reiter (#1) / (Austria) Nicolas Pfandl (#2)
  - Men's team winners:
  - Women's individual winners: (Germany) Cindy Haasch (#1) / (Austria) Lisa Hirner (#2)
  - Women's team winners:
- February 16 & 17: ACNC #8 in (Slovenia) Kranj
  - Men's individual winners: (Slovenia) Vid Vrhovnik (#1) / (Germany) Christian Frank (#2)
- March 9 & 10: ACNC #9 (final) in (France) Chaux-Neuve
  - Men's individual winners: (Austria) Max Teeling (#1) / (Slovenia) Rok Jelen (#2)
  - Women's individual winners: (Italy) Daniela Dejori (#1) / (Italy) Annika Sieff (#2)

=== 2018 FIS Nordic Combined Grand Prix ===
- Note: For the FIS page about these events, click here.
- August 17 – 19: GPNC #1 in (Germany) Oberwiesenthal
  - Men's individual winner: (Germany) Johannes Rydzek
  - Men's team winners: Austria (Franz-Josef Rehrl & Mario Seidl)
  - Women's individual winners: (Russia) Stefaniya Nadymova (#1) / (United States) Tara Geraghty-Moats (#2)
- August 21 & 22: GPNC #2 in (Austria) Villach
  - Men's individual winner: (Finland) Ilkka Herola
- August 23 – 25: GPNC #3 in (Germany) Oberstdorf
  - Men's individual winners: (Germany) Vinzenz Geiger (#1) / (Japan) Akito Watabe (#2)
- September 21 – 23: GPNC #4 (final) in (Slovenia) Planica
  - Men's individual winner: (Austria) Mario Seidl (2 times)

== Nordic skiing ==
- January 19 – 27: 2019 Nordic Junior World Ski Championships in (Finland) Lahti
  - Russia won the gold medal tally. Norway won the overall medal tally.
- February 19 – March 3: FIS Nordic World Ski Championships 2019 in (Austria) Seefeld
  - Norway won both the gold and overall medal tallies.

== Ski jumping ==
=== International ski jumping events ===
- January 19 – 27: Part of the 2019 Nordic Junior World Ski Championships in (Finland) Lahti
  - Individual winners: (Norway) Thomas Aasen Markeng (m) / (Russia) Anna Shpyneva (f)
  - Men's team winners: Germany (Luca Roth, Kilian Maerkl, Philipp Raimund, & Constantin Schmid)
  - Women's team winners: Russia (Mariia Iakovleva, Aleksandra Barantceva, Anna Shpyneva, & Lidiia Iakovleva)
  - Mixed team winners: Russia (Anna Shpyneva, Mikhail Purtov, Lidiia Iakovleva, & Maksim Sergeev)
- February 20 – March 3: Part of the FIS Nordic World Ski Championships 2019 in (Austria) Seefeld
  - Men's individual winners: (Germany) Markus Eisenbichler (#1) / (Poland) Dawid Kubacki (#2)
  - Men's team winners: Germany (Karl Geiger, Richard Freitag, Stephan Leyhe, & Markus Eisenbichler)
  - Women's individual winner: (Norway) Maren Lundby
  - Women's team winners: Germany (Juliane Seyfarth, Ramona Straub, Carina Vogt, & Katharina Althaus)
  - Mixed team winners: Germany (Katharina Althaus, Markus Eisenbichler, Juliane Seyfarth, & Karl Geiger)

=== 2018–19 Four Hills Tournament ===
- December 29 & 30, 2018: FHT #1 in (Germany) Oberstdorf
  - Men's individual winner: (Japan) Ryoyu Kobayashi
- December 31, 2018 & January 1, 2019: FHT #2 in (Germany) Garmisch-Partenkirchen
  - Men's individual winner: (Japan) Ryoyu Kobayashi
- January 3 & 4: FHT #3 in (Austria) Innsbruck
  - Men's individual winner: (Japan) Ryoyu Kobayashi
- January 5 & 6: FHT #4 (final) in (Austria) Bischofshofen
  - Men's individual winner: (Japan) Ryoyu Kobayashi

=== Raw Air 2019 ===
- March 8 – 10: RA #1 in Oslo (SJWC #20)
  - Individual winners: (Norway) Robert Johansson (m) / (Austria) Daniela Iraschko-Stolz (f)
  - Men's team winners: Norway (Johann André Forfang, Robin Pedersen, Marius Lindvik, & Robert Johansson)
- March 11 & 12: RA #2 in (Norway) Lillehammer (SJWC #21)
  - Individual winners: (Austria) Stefan Kraft (m) / (Norway) Maren Lundby (f)
- March 13 & 14: RA #3 in (Norway) Trondheim (SJWC #22)
  - Individual winners: (Japan) Ryoyu Kobayashi (m) / (Norway) Maren Lundby (f)
- March 15 – 17: RA #4 (final) in (Norway) Vikersund (SJWC #23)
  - Men's individual winner: (Slovenia) Domen Prevc
  - Men's team winners: Slovenia (Anže Semenič, Peter Prevc, Domen Prevc, & Timi Zajc)

=== 2018–19 FIS Ski Jumping World Cup ===
- Note: For the FIS page about these events, click here.
- November 16 – 18, 2018: SJWC #1 in Wisła
  - Men's individual winner: (Russia) Evgeni Klimov
  - Men's team winners: Poland (Piotr Żyła, Jakub Wolny, Dawid Kubacki, & Kamil Stoch)
- November 23 – 25, 2018: SJWC #2 in (Finland) Ruka
  - Men's individual winner: (Japan) Ryoyu Kobayashi (2 times)
- November 29 – December 2, 2018: SJWC #3 in (Norway) Lillehammer
  - Women's individual winners: (Germany) Juliane Seyfarth (#1) / (Russia) Lidiia Iakovleva (#2) / (Germany) Katharina Althaus (#3)
- November 30 – December 2, 2018: SJWC #4 in (Russia) Nizhny Tagil #1
  - Men's individual winners: (Norway) Johann André Forfang (#1) / (Japan) Ryoyu Kobayashi (#2)
- December 7 – 9, 2018: SJWC #5 in (Germany) Titisee-Neustadt
  - Event cancelled.
- December 14 – 16, 2018: SJWC #6 in (Switzerland) Engelberg
  - Men's individual winners: (Germany) Karl Geiger (#1) / (Japan) Ryoyu Kobayashi (#2)
- December 14 – 16: SJWC #7 in (France) Prémanon
  - Women's individual winner: (Germany) Katharina Althaus (2 times)
- January 11 – 13: SJWC #8 in (Japan) Sapporo #1
  - Women's individual winners: (Austria) Daniela Iraschko-Stolz (#1) / (Norway) Maren Lundby (#2)
- January 11 – 13: SJWC #9 in (Italy) Fiemme Valley
  - Men's individual winners: (Japan) Ryoyu Kobayashi (#1) / (Poland) Dawid Kubacki (#2)
- January 17 – 20: SJWC #10 in (Japan) Zaō, Miyagi
  - Women's individual winners: (Austria) Daniela Iraschko-Stolz (#1) / (Norway) Maren Lundby (#2)
  - Women's team winners: Germany (Juliane Seyfarth, Ramona Straub, Carina Vogt, & Katharina Althaus)
- January 18 – 20: SJWC #11 in (Poland) Zakopane
  - Men's individual winner: (Austria) Stefan Kraft
  - Men's team winners: Germany (Karl Geiger, Markus Eisenbichler, David Siegel, & Stephan Leyhe)
- January 25 – 27: SJWC #12 in (Romania) Râșnov
  - Women's individual winner: (Norway) Maren Lundby (2 times)
- January 25 – 27: SJWC #13 in (Japan) Sapporo #2
  - Men's individual winner: (Austria) Stefan Kraft (2 times)
- February 1 – 3: SJWC #14 in (Germany) Oberstdorf #1
  - Men's individual winners: (Slovenia) Timi Zajc (#1) / (Japan) Ryoyu Kobayashi (#2) / (Poland) Kamil Stoch (#3)
- February 1 – 3: SJWC #15 in (Austria) Hinzenbach
  - Women's individual winner: (Norway) Maren Lundby (2 times)
- February 7 – 10: SJWC #16 in (Slovenia) Ljubno ob Savinji
  - Note: The second women's event here was cancelled.
  - Women's individual winner: (Norway) Maren Lundby
  - Women's team winners: Germany (Carina Vogt, Anna Rupprecht, Juliane Seyfarth, & Katharina Althaus)
- February 8 – 10: SJWC #17 in (Finland) Lahti
  - Men's individual winner: (Poland) Kamil Stoch
  - Men's team winners: Austria (Philipp Aschenwald, Gregor Schlierenzauer, Michael Hayböck, & Stefan Kraft)
- February 15 – 17: SJWC #18 in (Germany) Willingen
  - Men's individual winners: (Germany) Karl Geiger (#1) / (Japan) Ryoyu Kobayashi (#2)
  - Men's team winners: Poland (Piotr Żyła, Jakub Wolny, Dawid Kubacki, & Kamil Stoch)
- February 15 – 17: SJWC #19 in (Germany) Oberstdorf #2
  - Women's individual winner: (Norway) Maren Lundby (2 times)
- March 15 – 17: SJWC #24 in (Russia) Nizhny Tagil #2
  - Women's individual winner: (Germany) Juliane Seyfarth (2 times)
- March 21 – 24: SJWC #25 in (Slovenia) Planica
  - Men's individual winners: (Germany) Markus Eisenbichler (#1) / (Japan) Ryoyu Kobayashi (#2)
  - Men's team winners: Poland (Jakub Wolny, Kamil Stoch, Dawid Kubacki, & Piotr Żyła)
- March 22 – 24: SJWC #26 (final) in (Russia) Chaykovsky, Perm Krai
  - Women's individual winners: (Germany) Juliane Seyfarth (#1) / (Norway) Maren Lundby (#2)

=== 2018–19 FIS Ski Jumping Continental Cup ===
- Note: For the FIS page about these events, click here.
- July 7 & 8: SJCC #1 in (Slovenia) Kranj
  - Men's individual winner: (Switzerland) Killian Peier (2 times)
- August 16 – 19: SJCC #2 in (Czech Republic) Frenštát pod Radhoštěm
  - Men's individual winner: (Czech Republic) Lukáš Hlava
- August 17: SJCC #3 in (Poland) Szczyrk
  - Men's individual winner: (Austria) Philipp Aschenwald
- August 18: SJCC #4 in (Poland) Wisła
  - Men's individual winner: (Austria) Philipp Aschenwald
- September 8 & 9: SJCC #5 in (Austria) Stams
  - Men's individual winners: (Austria) Philipp Aschenwald (#1) / (Switzerland) Killian Peier (#2)
- September 15 & 16: SJCC #6 in (Norway) Oslo
  - Men's individual winner: (Austria) Philipp Aschenwald (2 times)
  - Women's individual winner: (Germany) Katharina Althaus (2 times)
- September 22 & 23: SJCC #7 in (Poland) Zakopane #1
  - Men's individual winners: (Austria) Stefan Huber (#1) / (Austria) Philipp Aschenwald (#2)
- September 29 & 30: SJCC #8 in (Germany) Klingenthal #1
  - Men's individual winners: (Russia) Dimitry Vassiliev (#1) / (Poland) Aleksander Zniszczoł (#2)
- December 8 & 9: SJCC #9 in (Norway) Lillehammer
  - Men's individual winner: (Norway) Marius Lindvik (2 times)
- December 14 & 15: SJCC #10 in (Norway) Notodden
  - Women's individual winners: (Germany) Selina Freitag (#1) / (Austria) Claudia Purker (#2)
- December 15 & 16: SJCC #11 in (Finland) Ruka
  - Men's individual winner: (Norway) Robin Pedersen (2 times)
- December 27 & 28: SJCC #12 in (Switzerland) Engelberg
  - Men's individual winners: (Austria) Markus Schiffner (#1) / (Austria) Philipp Aschenwald (#2)
- January 5 & 6: SJCC #13 in (Germany) Klingenthal #2
  - Men's individual winners: (Germany) Moritz Baer (#1) / (Slovenia) Tilen Bartol (#2)
- January 12 & 13: SJCC #14 in (Austria) Bischofshofen
  - Men's individual winners: (Austria) Clemens Aigner (#1) / (Slovenia) Žiga Jelar (#2)
- January 18 – 20: SJCC #15 in (Japan) Sapporo Okurayama
  - Men's individual winner: (Austria) Clemens Aigner (3 times)
- January 19 & 20: SJCC #16 in (Slovenia) Planica #1
  - Women's individual winner: (Slovenia) Jerneja Brecl (2 times)
- January 26 & 27: SJCC #17 in (Slovenia) Planica #2
  - Men's individual winners: (Slovenia) Bor Pavlovčič (#1) / (Germany) Martin Hamann (#2)
- February 1 & 2: SJCC #18 in (Turkey) Erzurum
  - Event cancelled.
- February 8 – 10: SJCC #19 in (United States) Iron Mountain
  - Men's individual winners: (Germany) Pius Paschke (#1) / (Norway) Marius Lindvik (#2) / (Norway) Thomas Aasen Markeng (#3)
- February 15 & 16: SJCC #20 in (Germany) Oberstdorf
  - Men's individual winner: (Austria) Clemens Aigner (2 times)
- February 23 & 24: SJCC #21 in (Germany) Brotterode
  - Men's individual winners: (Austria) Clemens Aigner (#1) / (Norway) Marius Lindvik (#2)
  - Women's individual winners: (Germany) Pauline Heßler (#1) / (Slovenia) Katra Komar (#2)
- March 2 & 3, 2019: SJCC #22 in (Norway) Rena
  - Men's individual winner: (Norway) Marius Lindvik (2 times)
- March 16 & 17: SJCC #23 in (Poland) Zakopane #2
  - Men's individual winners: (Austria) Stefan Huber (#1) / (Poland) Aleksander Zniszczoł (#2)
- March 23 & 24: SJCC #24 (final) in (Russia) Chaykovsky
  - Men's individual winner: (Poland) Aleksander Zniszczoł (2 times)

=== 2018–19 FIS Ski Jumping Alpen Cup ===
- Note: For the FIS page about these events, click here.
- August 5 & 6: SJAC #1 in (Germany) Klingenthal
  - Women's individual winners: (Austria) Lisa Hirner (#1) / (Germany) Josephin Laue (#2)
- August 8 & 9: SJAC #2 in (Germany) Pöhla
  - Women's individual winners: (Austria) Lisa Hirner (#1) / (Germany) Alina Ihle (#2)
- August 10 & 11: SJAC #3 in (Germany) Bischofsgrün
  - Women's individual winners: (Austria) Lisa Hirner (#1) / (France) Oceane Paillard (#2)
- September 8 & 9: SJSC #4 in (Switzerland) Einsiedeln
  - Men's individual winner: (Austria) David Haagen (2 times)
- October 5 – 7: SJSC #5 in (Italy) Fiemme Valley-Predazzo
  - Men's individual winners: (Austria) David Haagen (#1) / (Slovenia) Jan Bombek (#2)
  - Women's individual winners: (Italy) Lara Malsiner (#1) / (Germany) Agnes Reisch (#2)
- December 21 – 23: SJSC #6 in (Austria) Villach
  - Men's individual winners: (Austria) Stefan Rainer (#1) / (Germany) Luca Roth (#2)
  - Women's individual winners: (Austria) Lisa Eder (#1) / (Austria) Lisa Hirner (#2)
- January 11 & 12: SJSC #7 in (Germany) Schonach im Schwarzwald
  - Women's individual winner: (France) Josephine Pagnier (2 times)
- January 12 & 13: SJSC #8 in (Germany) Oberwiesenthal
  - Event cancelled.
- February 8 – 10: SJSC #9 in (Switzerland) Kandersteg
  - Men's individual winners: (Slovenia) Rok Masle (#1) / (Austria) Marco Woergoetter (#2)
  - Men's team winners:
  - Women's individual winners: (Slovenia) Ana Jereb (#1) / (Austria) Lisa Hirner (#2)
  - Women's team winners:
- February 15 & 16: SJSC #10 in (Slovenia) Kranj
  - Men's individual winner: (Slovenia) Aljaž Osterc (2 times)
- February 23 & 24: SJSC #11 in (Germany) Oberhof
  - Men's individual winners: (Switzerland) Dominik Peter (#1) / (Austria) Claudio Moerth (#2)
- March 9 & 10: SJSC #12 (final) in (France) Chaux-Neuve
  - Note: The second women's individual event here was cancelled.
  - Men's individual winners: (Switzerland) Dominik Peter (#1) / (Austria) David Haagen (#2)
  - Women's individual winner: (Slovenia) Pia Mazi

=== 2018 FIS Ski Jumping Grand Prix ===
- Note: For the FIS page about these events, click here.
- July 20 – 22: SJGP #1 in Wisła
  - Men's individual winner: (Poland) Kamil Stoch
  - Men's team winners: Poland (Maciej Kot, Dawid Kubacki, Kamil Stoch, & Piotr Żyła)
- July 27 & 28: SJGP #2 in (Germany) Hinterzarten
  - Individual winners: (Poland) Kamil Stoch (m) / (Japan) Sara Takanashi (f)
- August 3 & 4: SJGP #3 in (Switzerland) Einsiedeln
  - Men's individual winner: (Poland) Kamil Stoch
- August 9 – 11: SJGP #4 in (France) Courchevel
  - Individual winners: (Russia) Evgeni Klimov (m) / (Japan) Sara Takanashi (f)
- August 16 – 19: SJGP #5 in (Czech Republic) Frenštát pod Radhoštěm
  - Women's individual winner: (Japan) Sara Takanashi (2 times)
- August 23 – 25: SJGP #6 in (Japan) Hakuba
  - Men's individual winner: (Japan) Ryoyu Kobayashi (2 times)
- September 7 – 9: SJGP #7 in (Russia) Chaykovsky, Perm Krai
  - Note: The men's individual event was cancelled.
  - Women's individual winner: (Slovenia) Ema Klinec
  - Mixed Team winners: Japan (Nozomi Maruyama, Yukiya Sato, Sara Takanashi, & Junshirō Kobayashi)
- September 21 – 23: SJGP #8 in (Romania) Râșnov
  - Men's individual winner: (Germany) Karl Geiger (2 times)
- September 27 & 28: SJGP #9 in (Czech Republic) Liberec
  - Event cancelled.
- September 29 & 30: SJGP #10 in (Austria) Hinzenbach
  - Men's individual winner: (Austria) Daniel Huber
- October 2 & 3: SJGP #11 (final) in (Germany) Klingenthal
  - Note: The men's individual event was cancelled.
  - Women's individual winner: (Germany) Anna Rupprecht

=== 2018 FIS Ski Jumping Cup ===
- Note: For the FIS page about these events, click here.
- July 7 & 8: SJC #1 in (Austria) Villach #1
  - Men's winners: (Germany) Justin Nietzel (#1) / (Switzerland) Luca Egloff (#2)
  - Women's winner: (Austria) Chiara Hoelzl (2 times)
- July 14 & 15: SJC #2 in (Poland) Szczyrk
  - Men's winners: (Austria) Maximilian Steiner (#1) / (Germany) Justin Nietzel (#2)
  - Women's winner: (Romania) Daniela Haralambie (2 times)
- August 18 & 19: SJC #3 in (Russia) Sochi
  - Event cancelled.
- September 15 & 16: SJC #4 in (Romania) Râșnov
  - Men's winner: (Japan) Ren Nikaido (2 times)
  - Women's winner: (Romania) Daniela Haralambie (2 times)
- December 14 & 15: SJC #5 in (Norway) Notodden
  - Men's winners: (Austria) Stefan Rainer (#1) / (Germany) Fabian Seidl (#2)
- December 19 & 20: SJC #6 in (United States) Utah Olympic Park
  - Men's winner: (Switzerland) Luca Egloff (2 times)
  - Women's winners: (Canada) Natalie Eilers (#1) / (Canada) Taylor Henrich (#2)
- January 12 & 13: SJC #7 in (Poland) Zakopane
  - Men's winners: (Austria) Claudio Moerth (#1) / (Austria) David Haagen (#2)
- January 19 & 20: SJC #8 in (Slovenia) Planica
  - Men's winner: (Slovenia) Cene Prevc (2 times)
- January 30 & 31: SJC #9 in (Turkey) Erzurum
  - Event cancelled.
- February 9 & 10: SJC #10 in (Germany) Rastbuechl
  - Men's winner: (Germany) Andreas Wank (2 times)
  - Women's winner: (Germany) Agnes Reisch (2 times)
- February 23 & 24: SJC #11 (final) in (Austria) Villach #2
  - Men's winner: (Germany) Andreas Wank (2 times)
  - Women's winners: (Italy) Giada Tomaselli (#1) / (Italy) Veronica Gianmoena (#2)

=== Other ski jumping events ===
- July 26, 2018: 2018 FIS Europa-Park FIS Youth Cup in (Germany) Hinterzarten
  - Winners: (Slovenia) Rok Masle (m) / (Slovenia) Ana Jereb (f)
- September 14, 2018: 2018 FIS Carpath Cup in (Romania) Râșnov
  - Winners: (United States) Andrew Urlaub (m) / (Italy) Annika Sieff (f)
- March 7 – 10: 2019 Miyasama Ski Games in both (Japan) Okurayama Ski Jump Stadium & Miyanomori Ski Jump Stadium (Sapporo)
  - Miyanomori Winners: (Japan) Keiichi Sato (m) / (Japan) Misaki Shigeno (f)
  - Okurayama Winners: (Japan) Yumu Harada (m) / (Japan) Misaki Shigeno (f)

== Snowboarding ==
=== Freestyle Ski and Snowboarding World Championships ===
- August 24 – September 6, 2018: Part of the FIS Junior Freestyle Ski & Snowboard World Championships 2018 in (New Zealand) Cardrona Alpine Resort
  - Note: The team snowboard cross events here were cancelled.
  - Big Air winners: (Japan) Takeru Otsuka (m) / (Japan) Kokomo Murase (f)
  - Snowboard Cross winners: (United States) Jake Vedder (m) / (Russia) Kristina Paul (f)
  - Slopestyle winners: (Japan) Takeru Otsuka (m) / (Japan) Kokomo Murase (f)
  - Halfpipe winners: (United States) Toby Miller (m) / (Japan) Mitsuki Ono (f)
  - Parallel Giant Slalom winners: (Russia) Dmitry Loginov (m) / (Russia) Milena Bykova (f)
  - Parallel Slalom winners: (Russia) Dmitry Loginov (m) / (Austria) Daniela Ulbing (f)
- January 26 – April 14: FIS Junior Freestyle Ski & Snowboard World Championships 2019 in (Switzerland) Leysin, (Slovenia) Rogla Ski Resort, (Austria) Reiteralm, & (Sweden) Klaeppen
  - Leysin (January 26 & 27)
  - Halfpipe winners: (Japan) Ruka Hirano (m) / (Japan) Mitsuki Ono (f)
  - Rogla (March 29 – April 5)
  - Parallel Giant Slalom winners: (Russia) Dmitry Loginov (m) / (Russia) Anastasia Kurochkina (f)
  - Parallel Slalom winners: (Ukraine) Mykhailo Kharuk (m) / (Russia) Maria Valova (f)
  - Team Parallel winners: Russia (Anastasia Kurochkina & Dmitry Loginov)
  - Reiteralm (April 1 – 3)
  - Snowboard Cross winners: (France) Loan Bozzolo (m) / (Germany) Jana Fischer (f)
  - Team Snowboard Cross winners: France (Chloe Passerat & Loan Bozzolo)
  - Klaeppen (April 4 – 14)
  - Slopestyle winners: (Canada) William Buffey (m) / (Canada) Sommer Gendron (f)
  - Big Air winners: (Japan) Ryoma Kimata (m) / (Canada) Sommer Gendron (f)
- February 1 – 10: Part of the FIS Freestyle Ski and Snowboarding World Championships 2019 in Park City, Deer Valley, & Solitude Mountain Resort
  - Note: The big air events here were cancelled.
  - Halfpipe winners: (Australia) Scotty James (m) / (United States) Chloe Kim (f)
  - Slopestyle winners: (United States) Chris Corning (m) / (New Zealand) Zoi Sadowski-Synnott (f)
  - Snowboard Cross winners: (United States) Mick Dierdorff (m) / (Czech Republic) Eva Samková (f)
  - Team Snowboard Cross winners: United States (Mick Dierdorff & Lindsey Jacobellis)
  - Parallel Giant Slalom winners: (Russia) Dmitry Loginov (m) / (Germany) Selina Jörg (f)
  - Parallel Slalom winners: (Russia) Dmitry Loginov (m) / (Switzerland) Julie Zogg (f)

=== Alpine snowboarding ===
- Note: For the FIS page about these events, click here.
- December 13, 2018: ASWC #1 in (Italy) Carezza
  - Parallel Giant Slalom winners: (Slovenia) Tim Mastnak (m) / (Italy) Nadya Ochner (f)
- December 14 & 15, 2018: ASWC #2 in (Italy) Cortina d'Ampezzo
  - Parallel Giant Slalom winners: (Italy) Roland Fischnaller (m) / (Czech Republic) Ester Ledecká (f)
- January 8 & 9: ASWC #3 in Bad Gastein
  - Parallel Slalom winners: (Germany) Stefan Baumeister (m) / (Austria) Claudia Riegler (f)
  - Team Parallel Slalom winners: Austria (Benjamin Karl & Daniela Ulbing)
- January 19: ASWC #4 in (Slovenia) Rogla Ski Resort
  - Parallel Giant Slalom winners: (Italy) Edwin Coratti (m) / (Germany) Selina Jörg (f)
- January 26 & 27: ASWC #5 in (Russia) Moscow
  - Parallel Slalom winners: (Russia) Andrey Sobolev (m) / (Switzerland) Julie Zogg (f)
  - Team Parallel Slalom winners: Austria (Daniela Ulbing & Benjamin Karl)
- February 16 & 17: ASWC #6 in (South Korea) PyeongChang
  - Men's Parallel Giant Slalom winners: (Slovenia) Žan Košir (#1) / (Austria) Andreas Prommegger (#2)
  - Women's Parallel Giant Slalom winners: (Czech Republic) Ester Ledecká (#1) / (Germany) Ramona Theresia Hofmeister (#2)
- February 23 & 24: ASWC #7 in (China) Genting Resort Secret Garden
  - Parallel Giant Slalom winners: (Slovenia) Tim Mastnak (m) / (Germany) Ramona Theresia Hofmeister (f)
  - Parallel Slalom winners: (Italy) Daniele Bagozza (m) / (China) Gong Naiying (f)
- March 9: ASWC #8 in (Switzerland) Scuol
  - Parallel Giant Slalom winners: (Russia) Andrey Sobolev (m) / (Russia) Milena Bykova (f)
- March 23 & 24: ASWC #9 (final) in (Germany) Winterberg
  - Parallel Slalom winners: (Austria) Lukas Mathies (m) / (Switzerland) Patrizia Kummer (f)
  - Team Parallel Slalom winners: Austria (Daniela Ulbing & Benjamin Karl)

=== Snowboard cross ===
- Note: For the FIS page about these events, click here.
- December 12 – 16, 2018: SBXWC #1 in (Austria) Montafon
  - Event cancelled.
- December 20 – 22, 2018: SBXWC #2 in (Italy) Breuil-Cervinia
  - Men's Snowboard Cross winners: (Germany) Martin Nörl (#1) / (Italy) Emanuel Perathoner (#2)
  - Women's Snowboard Cross winners: (United States) Lindsey Jacobellis (#1) / (Czech Republic) Eva Samková (#2)
- February 8 – 10: SBXWC #3 in (Germany) Feldberg
  - Note: The team snowboard cross event here was cancelled.
  - Snowboard Cross winners: (Australia) Cameron Bolton (m) / (United States) Lindsey Jacobellis (f)
- March 1 & 2: SBXWC #4 in (Spain) Baqueira-Beret
  - Snowboard Cross winners: (Austria) Alessandro Hämmerle (m) / (Czech Republic) Eva Samková (f)
- March 16: SBXWC #5 (final) in (Switzerland) Veysonnaz
  - Snowboard Cross winners: (Spain) Lucas Eguibar (m) / (Czech Republic) Eva Samková (f)

=== Freestyle snowboarding ===
- Note: For the FIS page about these events, click here.
- September 6 & 8, 2018: FSWC #1 in (New Zealand) Cardrona Alpine Resort
  - Big Air winners: (United States) Chris Corning (m) / (Japan) Reira Iwabuchi (f)
- November 3, 2018: FSWC #2 in (Italy) Modena Skipass
  - Big Air winners: (Japan) Takeru Otsuka (m) / (Japan) Reira Iwabuchi (f)
- November 23 & 24, 2018: FSWC #3 in (China) Beijing
  - Big Air winners: (Sweden) Sven Thorgren (m) / (Austria) Anna Gasser (f)
- December 6 & 8, 2018: FSWC #4 in (United States) Copper Mountain
  - Halfpipe winners: (Australia) Scotty James (m) / (United States) Chloe Kim (f)
- December 19 – 21, 2018: FSWC #5 in (China) Genting Resort Secret Garden
  - Halfpipe winners: (Switzerland) Jan Scherrer (m) / (China) Cai Xuetong (f)
  - Slopestyle winners: (Japan) Takeru Otsuka (m) / (Japan) Miyabi Onitsuka (f)
- January 11 & 12: FSWC #6 in (Austria) Kreischberg
  - Slopestyle winners: (Norway) Mons Røisland (m) / (Japan) Miyabi Onitsuka (f)
- January 15 – 19: FSWC #7 in (Switzerland) Laax
  - Slopestyle winners: (United States) Chris Corning (m) / (Norway) Silje Norendal (f)
  - Halfpipe winners: (Australia) Scotty James (m) / (United States) Chloe Kim (f)
- January 24 & 26: FSWC #8 in (Italy) Seiser Alm
  - Slopestyle winners: (Norway) Markus Olimstad (m) / (Switzerland) Isabel Derungs (f)
- February 13 & 15: FSWC #9 in (Canada) Calgary
  - Halfpipe winners: (Japan) Yūto Totsuka (m) / (Spain) Queralt Castellet (f)
- March 5 – 9: FSWC #10 in (United States) Mammoth Mountain
  - Note: The women's slopestyle event here was cancelled.
  - Men's Slopestyle winner: (United States) Red Gerard
  - Halfpipe winners: (Japan) Yūto Totsuka (m) / (China) Cai Xuetong (f)
- March 14 – 17: FSWC #11 (final) in (Canada) Quebec City
  - Note: The slopestyle events here was cancelled.
  - Big Air winners: (Belgium) Seppe Smits (m) / (United States) Julia Marino (f)
- March 22: FSWC #12 (final) in (Norway) Oslo
  - Event cancelled.

=== 2018–19 FIS Snowboard Europa Cup ===
- Note: For the FIS page about these events, click here.
- November 2018
- November 21 & 22, 2018: SBEC #1 in (Netherlands) Landgraaf
  - Slopestyle winners: (Netherlands) Erik Bastiaansen (m) / (Netherlands) Melissa Peperkamp (f)
- November 24 & 25, 2018: SBEC #2 in (Austria) Kaunertal
  - Event cancelled.
- November 28 & 29, 2018: SBEC #3 in (Austria) Pitztal
  - Men's Snowboard Cross winners: (Germany) Konstantin Schad (#1) / (Spain) Lucas Eguibar (#2)
  - Women's Snowboard Cross winners: (United Kingdom) Charlotte Bankes (#1) / (Czech Republic) Eva Samková (#2)
- December 2018
- December 22 & 23, 2018: SBEC #4 in (Germany) Hochfügen
  - Men's Parallel Giant Slalom winners: (Italy) Maurizio Bormolini (#1) / (Austria) Arvid Auner (#2)
  - Women's Parallel Giant Slalom winners: (Germany) Ramona Theresia Hofmeister (#1) / (Austria) Jemima Juritz (#2)
- January 2019
- January 8 & 9: SBEC #5 in (Slovakia) Jasná
  - Event cancelled.
- January 10 & 11: SBEC #6 in (Austria) Bad Gastein
  - Men's Parallel Slalom winners: (South Korea) Lee Sang-ho (#1) / (Russia) Dmitriy Karlagachev (#2)
  - Women's Parallel Slalom winners: (Switzerland) Patrizia Kummer (#1) / (Russia) Maria Valova (#2)
- January 12 & 13: SBEC #7 in (France) Puy-Saint-Vincent
  - Men's Snowboard Cross winners: (Italy) Lorenzo Sommariva (#1) / (Germany) Florian Gregor (#2)
  - Women's Snowboard Cross winner: (United Kingdom) Charlotte Bankes (2 times)
- January 16 & 17: SBEC #8 in (Austria) Kreischberg
  - Big Air winners: (Switzerland) Boris Mouton (m) / (Netherlands) Melissa Peperkamp (f)
  - Slopestyle winners: (Switzerland) Moritz Boll (m) / (Netherlands) Melissa Peperkamp (f)
- January 19 & 20: SBEC #9 in (Germany) Grasgehren
  - Men's Snowboard Cross winners: (Austria) Jakob Dusek (#1) / (Switzerland) Kalle Koblet (#2)
  - Women's Snowboard Cross winner: (Switzerland) Lara Casanova (2 times)
- January 22 & 23: SBEC #10 in (France) Font-Romeu
  - Note: The slopestyle events here were cancelled.
  - Big Air winners: (Switzerland) Moritz Boll (m) / (France) Lucie Silvestre (f)
- January 25 & 26: SBEC #11 in (France) Vars
  - Slopestyle winners: (Switzerland) Moritz Boll (m) / (France) Lucie Silvestre (f)
  - Big Air winners: (Germany) Leon Guetl (m) / (France) Noemie Equy (f)
- January 26 & 27: SBEC #12 in (Austria) Lachtal
  - Men's Parallel Giant Slalom winners: (Russia) Igor Sluev (#1) / (Russia) Ilia Vitugov (#2)
  - Women's Parallel Giant Slalom winners: (Switzerland) Jessica Keiser (#1) / (Russia) Sofia Nadyrshina (#2)
- January 29 & 30: SBEC #13 in (France) Val Thorens
  - Note: The second snowboard cross events for men and women were cancelled.
  - Snowboard Cross winners: (Germany) Florian Gregor (m) / (Austria) Katharina Neussner (f)
- January 31 & February 1: SBEC #14 in (Italy) Monte Bondone
  - Event cancelled.
- February 2019
- February 2 & 3: SBEC #15 in (Bosnia and Herzegovina) Sarajevo
  - Men's Big Air winners: (Serbia) Matija Milenković (#1) / (Croatia) Tino Stojak (#2)
  - Women's Big Air winner: (Poland) Martyna Maciejewska (2 times)
- February 6 & 7: SBEC #16 in (Czech Republic) Dolní Morava
  - Men's Snowboard Cross winners: (Austria) David Pickl (#1) / (Austria) Sebastian Jud (#2)
  - Women's Snowboard Cross winners: (France) Chloe Passerat (#1) / (Austria) Katharina Neussner (#2)
- February 7 & 8: SBEC #17 in (Serbia) Kopaonik
  - Men's Big Air winners: (Croatia) Tino Stojak (#1) / (Germany) Noah Vicktor (#2)
  - Women's Big Air winners: (Serbia) Jelena Ignjatov (#1) / (Slovenia) Tinkara Tanja Valcl (#2)
- February 9 & 10: SBEC #18 in (Switzerland) Lenzerheide
  - Men's Parallel Slalom winner: (Austria) Fabian Obmann (2 times)
  - Women's Parallel Slalom winner: (Russia) Anastasia Kurochkina (2 times)
- February 9 & 10: SBEC #19 in (Switzerland) Crans-Montana
  - Halfpipe winners: (Italy) Lorenzo Gennero (m) / (Switzerland) Berenice Wicki (f)
- February 15 & 16: SBEC #20 in (Poland) Kotelnica Bialczanska
  - Big Air winners: (Croatia) Tino Stojak (m) / (Poland) Martyna Maciejewska (f)
- February 22 & 23: SBEC #21 in (Switzerland) Davos #1
  - Big Air winners: (Switzerland) Nick Puenter (m) / (Switzerland) Lia-Mara Boesch (f)
- February 26 & 27: SBEC #22 in (Germany) Götschen
  - Men's Big Air winners: (United Kingdom) Gabriel Adams (#1) / (Croatia) Tino Stojak (#2)
  - Women's Big Air winners: (Germany) Nadja Flemming (#1) / (Austria) Emma Lantos (#2)
- March 2019
- March 2 & 3: SBEC #23 in (Switzerland) Davos #2
  - Men's Parallel Giant Slalom & Parallel Slalom winner: (Japan) Masaki Shiba
  - Women's Parallel Giant Slalom & Parallel Slalom winner: (Switzerland) Patrizia Kummer
- March 8 – 10: SBEC #24 in (Georgia (country)) Gudauri
  - Men's Snowboard Cross winners: (Austria) Jakob Dusek (#1) / (France) Merlin Surget (#2)
  - Women's Snowboard Cross winner: (Germany) Hanna Ihedioha (2 times)
- March 10 – 16: SBEC #25 in (Russia) Sunny Valley (Miass)
  - Men's Snowboard Cross winners: (Austria) Jakob Dusek (#1) / (France) Loan Bozzolo (#2)
  - Women's Snowboard Cross winners: (Germany) Jana Fischer (#1) / (Switzerland) Sophie Hediger (#2)
- March 15 – 17: SBEC #26 in (Austria) Kühtai Saddle
  - Big Air winners: (Belgium) Jules de Sloover (m) / (Belgium) Evy Poppe (f)
  - Halfpipe winners: (Germany) Christoph Lechner (m) / (Germany) Leilani Ettel (f)
- March 16: SBEC #27 in (Czech Republic) Pec pod Sněžkou
  - Slopestyle winners: (Germany) Leon Guetl (m) / (Czech Republic) Šárka Pančochová (f)
- March 16 & 17: SBEC #28 in (Slovenia) Rogla Ski Resort
  - Men's Parallel Giant Slalom winner: (Slovenia) Tim Mastnak (2 times)
  - Women's Parallel Giant Slalom winners: (Russia) Elizaveta Salikhova (#1) / (Russia) Anastasia Kurochkina (#2)
- March 18 & 19: SBEC #29 in (Slovakia) Jasná
  - Men's Slopestyle winners: (Germany) Noah Vicktor (#1) / (Germany) Leon Guetl (#2)
  - Women's Slopestyle winner: (France) Lucie Silvestre (2 times)
- March 21 – 24: SBEC #30 in (Switzerland) Laax
  - Slopestyle winners: (Germany) Noah Vicktor (m) / (Switzerland) Bianca Gisler (f)
  - Halfpipe winners: (Germany) Andre Hoeflich (m) / (Switzerland) Verena Rohrer (f)
- March 22 – 24: SBEC #31 in (Switzerland) Lenk
  - Men's Snowboard Cross winner: (France) Loan Bozzolo (2 times)
  - Women's Snowboard Cross winner: (France) Chloé Trespeuch (2 times)
- March 26 – 28: SBEC #32 in (Russia) Sochi
  - Slopestyle winners: (Russia) Mark Teimurov (m) / (Russia) Ekaterina Kosova (f)
  - Big Air winners: (Russia) Mikhail Matveev (m) / (Russia) Ekaterina Kosova (f)
- March 28 & 29: SBEC #33 in (Italy) Livigno
  - Men's Slopestyle winner: (Switzerland) Jonas Bösiger (2 times)
  - Women's Slopestyle winner: (Belgium) Loranne Smans (2 times)
- April 2019
- April 6 & 7: SBEC #34 in (Italy) Racines
  - Men's Parallel Slalom winners: (Austria) Arvid Auner (#1) / (Germany) Stefan Baumeister (#2)
  - Women's Parallel Slalom winners: (Japan) Tsubaki Miki (#1) / (Austria) Jemima Juritz (#2)
- April 10 – 14: SBEC #35 (final) in (Switzerland) Silvaplana
  - Note: The men's slopestyle event here was cancelled.
  - Women's Slopestyle winner: (Switzerland) Isabel Derungs
  - Big Air winners: (Switzerland) Jonas Bösiger (m) / (Switzerland) Carla Somaini (f)

=== 2018–19 FIS Snowboard Nor-Am Cup ===
- Note: For the FIS page about these events, click here.
- December 8 & 9, 2018: SNAC #1 in (Colorado) Steamboat Ski Resort
  - Parallel Giant Slalom winners: (United States) Robert Burns (m) / (Japan) Tsubaki Miki (f)
  - Parallel Slalom winners: (United States) Robert Burns (m) / (Republic of Ireland) Maggie Carrigan (f)
- December 11 & 12, 2018: SNAC #2 in (Colorado) Copper Mountain
  - Men's Halfpipe winner: (Japan) Yūto Totsuka (2 times)
  - Women's Halfpipe winners: (Japan) Kurumi Imai (#1) / (Japan) Hikaru Ōe (#2)
- December 14 – 16, 2018: SNAC #3 in (Minnesota) Buck Hill
  - Men's Parallel Slalom winners: (United States) Cody Winters (#1; 2 times) / (United States) Robert Burns (#2)
  - Women's Parallel Slalom winners: (Japan) Tsubaki Miki (#1) / (Canada) Kaylie Buck (#2; 2 times)
- January 2 – 4: SNAC #4 in (Quebec) Le Relais
  - Men's Parallel Giant Slalom winners: (Canada) Jasey-Jay Anderson (#1) / (United States) Ryan Rosencranz (#2)
  - Women's Parallel Giant Slalom winners: (Canada) Kaylie Buck (#1) / (United States) Lynn Ott (#2)
- January 7 – 9: SNAC #5 in (British Columbia) Panorama Mountain Village
  - Men's Snowboard Cross winners: (Netherlands) Glenn de Blois (#1) / (United States) Hagen Kearney (#2)
  - Women's Snowboard Cross winners: (Canada) Tess Critchlow (#1) / (Canada) Carle Brenneman (#2)
- January 14 & 15: SNAC #6 in (New Hampshire) Waterville Valley Resort
  - Men's Slopestyle winners: (United States) Jake Canter (#1) / (United States) Luke Winkelmann (#2)
  - Women's Slopestyle winners: (United States) Addison Gardner (#1) / (United States) Courtney Rummel (#2)
- January 22 – 24: SNAC #7 in (British Columbia) Sun Peaks Resort
  - Slopestyle winners: (United States) Luke Winkelmann (m) / (United States) Addison Gardner (f)
  - Big Air winners: (United States) Storm Rowe (m) / (United States) Jade Thurgood (f)
- February 6 – 8: SNAC #8 in (Ontario) Craigleith Ski Club
  - Men's Snowboard Cross winners: (United States) Cole Johnson (#1) / (United States) Mike Lacroix (#2)
  - Women's Snowboard Cross winners: (Australia) Christina Taylor (#1) / (United States) Emma Downing (#2)
- February 6 – 8: SNAC #9 in (Ontario) Mount St. Louis Moonstone
  - Note: The big air events here were cancelled.
  - Slopestyle winners: (United States) Storm Rowe (m) / (United States) Addison Gardner (f)
- February 9 & 10: SNAC #10 in (Ontario) Alpine Ski Club
  - Men's Parallel Slalom winner: (Canada) Arnaud Gaudet (2 times)
  - Women's Parallel Slalom winner: (Canada) Kaylie Buck (2 times)
- February 11 – 13: SNAC #11 in (Quebec) Mont Original
  - Men's Snowboard Cross winners: (Canada) Éliot Grondin (#1) / (Canada) Liam Moffatt (#2)
  - Women's Snowboard Cross winner: (United States) Livia Molodyh (2 times)
- February 18 – 23: SNAC #12 in (Colorado) Ski Cooper
  - Men's Snowboard Cross winners: (United States) Senna Leith (#1) / (South Korea) WOO Jin (#2)
  - Women's Snowboard Cross winners: (United States) Anna Miller (#1) / (United States) Stacy Gaskill (#2)
- February 28 & March 1: SNAC #13 in (New York (state)) Holiday Valley #1
  - Men's Parallel Giant Slalom winner: (Canada) Arnaud Gaudet (2 times)
  - Women's Parallel Giant Slalom winner: (Canada) Megan Farrell (2 times)
- March 3 – 8: SNAC #14 in (Ontario) Blue Mountain
  - Parallel Giant Slalom winners: (Canada) Sebastien Beaulieu (m) / (Canada) Katrina Gerencser (f)
  - Parallel Slalom winners: (Canada) Jules Lefebvre (m) / (Canada) Megan Farrell (f)
- March 12 – 17: SNAC #15 in (New York (state)) Holiday Valley #2
  - Men's Snowboard Cross winners: (Canada) Liam Moffatt (#1) / (United States) Mike Lacroix (#2)
  - Women's Snowboard Cross winner: (Canada) Audrey McManiman (2 times)
- March 13 & 14: SNAC #16 in (California) Mammoth Mountain Ski Area
  - Slopestyle winners: (Canada) Liam Brearley (m) / (United States) Addison Gardner (f)
  - Halfpipe winners: (Canada) Shawn Fair (m) / (Canada) Brooke Dhondt (f)
- March 18 – 24: SNAC #17 in (Alberta) Canada Olympic Park (Calgary)
  - Halfpipe winners: (Canada) Shawn Fair (m) / (Canada) Brooke Dhondt (f)
  - Men's Slopestyle & Big Air winner: (Canada) Nicolas Laframboise
  - Women's Slopestyle & Big Air winner: (Canada) Jasmine Baird
- March 26 – 28: SNAC #18 (final) in (British Columbia) Big White Ski Resort
  - Snowboard Cross winners: (Canada) Danny Bourgeois (m) / (Canada) Tess Critchlow (f)

=== 2018 FIS Snowboard South American Cup ===
- Note: For the FIS page about these events, click here.
- August 3 – 5: SACSB #1 in (Chile) La Parva #1
  - Men's Slopestyle winners: (Argentina) Martin Jaureguialzo (#1) / (Chile) Inaqui Irarrazaval (#2)
  - Women's Slopestyle winner: (Chile) Antonia Yanez (2 times)
- August 10 – 12: SACSB #2 in (Chile) La Parva #2
  - Note: Both women's snowboard cross events here were cancelled.
  - Men's Snowboard Cross winners: (Argentina) Simon White (#1) / (Argentina) Steven Williams (#2)
- September 14 & 15: SACSB #3 in (Argentina) Cerro Catedral
  - Men's Big Air winners: (Argentina) Matías Schmitt (#1) / (Argentina) Federico Chiaradio de la Iglesia (#2)
  - Women's Big Air winner: (Chile) Antonia Yanez (2 times)
- September 18 – 23: SACSB #4 & #5 (final) in (Argentina) Cerro Castor
  - Big Air winners: (Argentina) Federico Chiaradio de la Iglesia (m) / (Argentina) Maria Azul Chavez Martinez (f)
  - Slopestyle winners: (Argentina) Matías Schmitt (m) / (Argentina) Morena Poggi Silveira (f)
  - Snowboard Cross winners: (Spain) Regino Hernández (m) / (Argentina) Maria Agustina Pardo (f)

=== 2018 FIS Snowboard Australia & New Zealand Cup ===
- Note: For the FIS page about these events, click here.
- July 30 – August 1: SBANC #1 in (Australia) Mount Hotham #1
  - Snowboard Cross winners: (Australia) Alex Pullin (m) / (Australia) Emily Boyce (f)
- August 14 – 16: SBANC #2 in (New Zealand) Cardrona Alpine Resort
  - Slopestyle winners: (Japan) Ryo Aizawa (m) / (Japan) Rina Yoshika (f)
  - Half-pipe winners: (South Korea) Lee Kwang-ki (m) / (South Korea) LEE Min-ju (f)
- September 3 – 5: SBANC #3 (final) in (Australia) Mount Hotham #2
  - Note: The third set of snowboard cross events here was cancelled.
  - Men's Snowboard Cross winners: (Germany) Paul Berg (#1) / (Australia) Alex Pullin (#2)
  - Women's Snowboard Cross winner: (Australia) Emily Boyce (2 times)

== Telemark skiing ==
=== Telemark Skiing World Championships ===
- February 14 – 18: 2019 Junior Telemark Skiing World Championships in (Slovenia) Krvavec Ski Resort
  - Note: The Junior World Championship and the World Cup are separate events, even though they are located in an identical location and dates.
  - Classic winners: (France) Noe Claye (m) / (France) Chloe Blyth (f)
  - Team Parallel Sprint winners: France
  - Parallel Sprint winners: (Germany) Christoph Frank (m) / (Norway) Goril Strom Eriksen (f)
  - Sprint winners: (France) Theo Sillon (m) / (France) Julie Bourbon (f)
- March 20 – 23: 2019 Telemark Skiing World Championships in (Norway) Rjukan
  - Classic winners: (Norway) Trym Nygaard Loeken (m) / (Switzerland) Amelie Wenger-Reymond (f)
  - Sprint winners: (Switzerland) Stefan Matter (m) / (Switzerland) Amelie Wenger-Reymond (f)
  - Parallel Sprint winners: (France) Philippe Lau (m) / (Germany) Johanna Holzmann (f)
  - Team Parallel Sprint winners: Switzerland

=== 2019 Telemark Skiing World Cup ===
- Note: For the FIS page about these events, click here.
- January 20 & 21: TSWC #1 in (Italy) La Thuile
  - Classic winners: (Norway) Trym Nygaard Loeken (m) / (Switzerland) Amelie Wenger-Reymond (f)
  - Sprint winners: (Norway) Trym Nygaard Loeken (m) / (France) Argeline Tan Bouquet (f)
- January 25 & 26: TSWC #2 in (France) Pralognan-la-Vanoise
  - Sprint winners: (France) Philippe Lau (m) / (United Kingdom) Jasmin Taylor (f)
  - Classic winners: (Switzerland) Stefan Matter (m) / (Switzerland) Amelie Wenger-Reymond (f)
- January 29 – February 1: TSWC #3 in (France) Pra-Loup
  - Classic winners: (Switzerland) Stefan Matter (m) / (Switzerland) Amelie Wenger-Reymond (f)
  - Sprint winners: (Switzerland) Bastien Dayer (m) / (Switzerland) Amelie Wenger-Reymond (f)
  - Parallel Sprint winners: (France) Philippe Lau (m) / (France) Argeline Tan Bouquet (f)
- February 9 & 10: TSWC #4 in (Germany) Bad Hindelang-Oberjoch
  - Sprint winners: (Switzerland) Bastien Dayer (m) / (Switzerland) Amelie Wenger-Reymond (f)
  - Parallel Sprint winners: (Norway) Trym Nygaard Loeken (m) / (Switzerland) Amelie Wenger-Reymond (f)
- February 14 – 18: TSWC #5 (final) in (Slovenia) Krvavec Ski Resort
  - Classic winners: (Switzerland) Bastien Dayer (m) / (Switzerland) Amelie Wenger-Reymond (f)
  - Parallel Sprint winners: (France) Philippe Lau (m) / (Germany) Johanna Holzmann (f)
  - Sprint winners: (Switzerland) Stefan Matter (m) / (Switzerland) Amelie Wenger-Reymond (f)
