= FIS Freestyle Ski and Snowboarding World Championships 2023 – Men's snowboard cross =

Men's snowboard cross at the FIS Freestyle Ski and Snowboarding World Championships 2023
- Location: Bakuriani, Georgia
- Dates: 1 March
- Competitors: 48 from 19 nations

Medalists
| gold medal | Jakob Dusek | Austria |
| silver medal | Martin Nörl | Germany |
| bronze medal | Omar Visintin | Italy |

The Men's snowboard cross competition at the FIS Freestyle Ski and Snowboarding World Championships 2023 was held on 1 March 2023.

== Elimination round ==
=== 1/16 finals ===
Heat 1

| Rank | Bib | Name | Country | Notes |
|---|---|---|---|---|
| 1 | 1 | Martin Nörl | Germany | Q |
| 2 | 33 | Bernat Ribera | Spain | Q |
| 3 | 32 | Woo Jin | South Korea | |

Heat 3

| Rank | Bib | Name | Country | Notes |
|---|---|---|---|---|
| 1 | 41 | Jakub Žerava | Czech Republic | Q |
| 2 | 24 | Álvaro Romero | Spain | Q |
| 3 | 9 | Lucas Eguibar | Spain | |

Heat 5

| Rank | Bib | Name | Country | Notes |
|---|---|---|---|---|
| 1 | 5 | Merlin Surget | France | Q |
| 2 | 37 | Kryštof Choura | Czech Republic | Q |
| | 28 | Michele Godino | Italy | DNF |

Heat 7

| Rank | Bib | Name | Country | Notes |
|---|---|---|---|---|
| 1 | 20 | Yoshiki Takahara | Japan | Q |
| 2 | 13 | Glenn de Blois | Netherlands | Q |
| 3 | 45 | Ivan Malovannyi | Ukraine | |

Heat 9

| Rank | Bib | Name | Country | Notes |
|---|---|---|---|---|
| 1 | 3 | Jakob Dusek | Austria | Q |
| 2 | 35 | Noah Bethonico | Brazil | Q |
| | 30 | Radek Houser | Czech Republic | DNF |

Heat 11

| Rank | Bib | Name | Country | Notes |
|---|---|---|---|---|
| 1 | 22 | Senna Leith | United States | Q |
| 2 | 43 | Antoni Toledo | Spain | Q |
| | 11 | Julian Lüftner | Austria | DNF |

Heat 13

| Rank | Bib | Name | Country | Notes |
|---|---|---|---|---|
| 1 | 26 | Luca Hämmerle | Austria | Q |
| 2 | 39 | Thomas Abegglen | Switzerland | Q |
| 3 | 7 | Lorenzo Sommariva | Italy | |

Heat 15

| Rank | Bib | Name | Country | Notes |
|---|---|---|---|---|
| 1 | 15 | Léo Le Blé Jaques | France | Q |
| 2 | 47 | Roman Aleksandrovskyy | Ukraine | Q |
| 3 | 18 | Paul Berg | Germany | |

Heat 2

| Rank | Bib | Name | Country | Notes |
|---|---|---|---|---|
| 1 | 16 | Nick Baumgartner | United States | Q |
| 2 | 17 | Kalle Koblet | Switzerland | Q |
| 3 | 48 | Anton Karpov | Ukraine | |

Heat 4

| Rank | Bib | Name | Country | Notes |
|---|---|---|---|---|
| 1 | 8 | Omar Visintin | Italy | Q |
| 2 | 25 | Leon Beckhaus | Germany | Q |
| 3 | 40 | Ye Kangjia | China | |

Heat 6

| Rank | Bib | Name | Country | Notes |
|---|---|---|---|---|
| 1 | 21 | Liam Moffatt | Canada | Q |
| 2 | 12 | Jake Vedder | United States | Q |
| 3 | 44 | Huw Nightingale | Great Britain | |

Heat 8

| Rank | Bib | Name | Country | Notes |
|---|---|---|---|---|
| 1 | 4 | Éliot Grondin | Canada | Q |
| 2 | 36 | Drew Powell | Latvia | Q |
| 3 | 29 | Filippo Ferrari | Italy | |

Heat 10

| Rank | Bib | Name | Country | Notes |
|---|---|---|---|---|
| 1 | 14 | Adam Lambert | Australia | Q |
| 2 | 19 | Mick Dierdorff | United States | Q |
| 3 | 46 | Víctor Chávez | Peru | |

Heat 12

| Rank | Bib | Name | Country | Notes |
|---|---|---|---|---|
| 1 | 6 | Loan Bozzolo | France | Q |
| 2 | 27 | Aidan Chollet | France | Q |
| | 38 | Valerio Jud | Switzerland | DNF |

Heat 14

| Rank | Bib | Name | Country | Notes |
|---|---|---|---|---|
| 1 | 23 | Evan Bichon | Canada | Q |
| 2 | 10 | Cameron Bolton | Australia | Q |
| | 42 | Jan Kubičík | Czech Republic | DNF |

Heat 16

| Rank | Bib | Name | Country | Notes |
|---|---|---|---|---|
| 1 | 2 | Alessandro Hämmerle | Austria | Q |
| 2 | 31 | Leon Ulbricht | Germany | Q |
| 3 | 34 | Tristan Bell | Canada | |

=== 1/8 finals ===
Heat 1

| Rank | Bib | Name | Country | Notes |
|---|---|---|---|---|
| 1 | 1 | Martin Nörl | Germany | Q |
| 2 | 16 | Nick Baumgartner | United States | Q |
| 3 | 17 | Kalle Koblet | Switzerland | |
| 4 | 33 | Bernat Ribera | Spain | |

Heat 3

| Rank | Bib | Name | Country | Notes |
|---|---|---|---|---|
| 1 | 21 | Liam Moffatt | Canada | Q |
| 2 | 5 | Merlin Surget | France | Q |
| 3 | 12 | Jake Vedder | United States | |
| 4 | 37 | Kryštof Choura | Czech Republic | |

Heat 5

| Rank | Bib | Name | Country | Notes |
|---|---|---|---|---|
| 1 | 3 | Jakob Dusek | Austria | Q |
| 2 | 14 | Adam Lambert | Australia | Q |
| 3 | 19 | Mick Dierdorff | United States | |
| 4 | 35 | Noah Bethonico | Brazil | |

Heat 7

| Rank | Bib | Name | Country | Notes |
|---|---|---|---|---|
| 1 | 23 | Evan Bichon | Canada | Q |
| 2 | 10 | Cameron Bolton | Australia | Q |
| 3 | 26 | Luca Hämmerle | Austria | |
| 4 | 39 | Thomas Abegglen | Switzerland | |

Heat 2

| Rank | Bib | Name | Country | Notes |
|---|---|---|---|---|
| 1 | 8 | Omar Visintin | Italy | Q |
| 2 | 24 | Álvaro Romero | Spain | Q |
| 3 | 25 | Leon Beckhaus | Germany | |
| 4 | 41 | Jakub Žerava | Czech Republic | |

Heat 4

| Rank | Bib | Name | Country | Notes |
|---|---|---|---|---|
| 1 | 4 | Éliot Grondin | Canada | Q |
| 2 | 13 | Glenn de Blois | Netherlands | Q |
| 3 | 20 | Yoshiki Takahara | Japan | |
| 4 | 36 | Drew Powell | Latvia | |

Heat 6

| Rank | Bib | Name | Country | Notes |
|---|---|---|---|---|
| 1 | 6 | Loan Bozzolo | France | Q |
| 2 | 22 | Senna Leith | United States | Q |
| 3 | 43 | Antoni Toledo | Spain | |
| | 27 | Aidan Chollet | France | DNF |

Heat 8

| Rank | Bib | Name | Country | Notes |
|---|---|---|---|---|
| 1 | 31 | Leon Ulbricht | Germany | Q |
| 2 | 2 | Alessandro Hämmerle | Austria | Q |
| 3 | 15 | Léo Le Blé Jaques | France | |
| 4 | 47 | Roman Aleksandrovskyy | Ukraine | |

=== Quarterfinals ===
Heat 1

| Rank | Bib | Name | Country | Notes |
|---|---|---|---|---|
| 1 | 1 | Martin Nörl | Germany | Q |
| 2 | 8 | Omar Visintin | Italy | Q |
| 3 | 16 | Nick Baumgartner | United States | |
| 4 | 24 | Álvaro Romero | Spain | |

Heat 3

| Rank | Bib | Name | Country | Notes |
|---|---|---|---|---|
| 1 | 3 | Jakob Dusek | Austria | Q |
| 2 | 14 | Adam Lambert | Australia | Q |
| 3 | 22 | Senna Leith | United States | |
| 4 | 6 | Loan Bozzolo | France | |

Heat 2

| Rank | Bib | Name | Country | Notes |
|---|---|---|---|---|
| 1 | 5 | Merlin Surget | France | Q |
| 2 | 21 | Liam Moffatt | Canada | Q |
| 3 | 4 | Éliot Grondin | Canada | |
| | 13 | Glenn de Blois | Netherlands | DNF |

Heat 4

| Rank | Bib | Name | Country | Notes |
|---|---|---|---|---|
| 1 | 2 | Alessandro Hämmerle | Austria | Q |
| 2 | 10 | Cameron Bolton | Australia | Q |
| 3 | 31 | Leon Ulbricht | Germany | |
| 4 | 23 | Evan Bichon | Canada | |

=== Semifinals ===
Heat 1

| Rank | Bib | Name | Country | Notes |
|---|---|---|---|---|
| 1 | 8 | Omar Visintin | Italy | Q |
| 2 | 1 | Martin Nörl | Germany | Q |
| 3 | 21 | Liam Moffatt | Canada | |
| 4 | 5 | Merlin Surget | France | |

Heat 2

| Rank | Bib | Name | Country | Notes |
|---|---|---|---|---|
| 1 | 2 | Alessandro Hämmerle | Austria | Q |
| 2 | 3 | Jakob Dusek | Austria | Q |
| 3 | 14 | Adam Lambert | Australia | |
| 4 | 10 | Cameron Bolton | Australia | |

=== Finals ===
==== Small final ====
| Rank | Bib | Name | Country | Notes |
|---|---|---|---|---|
| 5 | 5 | Merlin Surget | France | |
| 6 | 10 | Cameron Bolton | Australia | |
| 7 | 21 | Liam Moffatt | Canada | |
| 8 | 14 | Adam Lambert | Australia | DNF |

==== Big final ====
| Rank | Bib | Name | Country | Notes |
|---|---|---|---|---|
| 1st place, gold medalist(s) | 3 | Jakob Dusek | Austria | |
| 2nd place, silver medalist(s) | 1 | Martin Nörl | Germany | |
| 3rd place, bronze medalist(s) | 8 | Omar Visintin | Italy | |
| 4 | 2 | Alessandro Hämmerle | Austria | |
