= Snowboarding at the 2018 Winter Olympics – Men's snowboard cross =

Men's snowboard cross at the XXIII Olympic Winter Games
- Venue: Bogwang Phoenix Park
- Date: 15 February
- Competitors: 39 from 16 nations

Medalists
1st place, gold medalist(s)		Pierre Vaultier	France
2nd place, silver medalist(s)		Jarryd Hughes	Australia
3rd place, bronze medalist(s)		Regino Hernández	Spain

The men's snowboard cross competition of the 2018 Winter Olympics was held on 15 February 2018 Bogwang Phoenix Park in Pyeongchang, South Korea.

In the victory ceremony, the medals were presented by James Tomkins, member of the International Olympic Committee, accompanied by Dean Gosper, FIS council member.

== Qualification ==
The top 40 athletes in the Olympic quota allocation list qualified, with a maximum of four athletes per National Olympic Committee (NOC) allowed. All athletes qualifying must also have placed in the top 30 of a FIS World Cup event or the FIS Freestyle Ski and Snowboarding World Championships 2017 during the qualification period (July 1, 2016 to January 21, 2018) and also have a minimum of 100 FIS points to compete. If the host country, South Korea at the 2018 Winter Olympics did not qualify, their chosen athlete would displace the last qualified athlete, granted all qualification criterion was met.

== Results ==
=== Seeding ===
The seeding run was held at 11:00.

Rank	Bib	Name	Country	Run 1	Run 2	Best	Notes
1	15	Pierre Vaultier	France	1:13.14	—	1:13.14	
2	7	Omar Visintin	Italy	1:13.25	—	1:13.25	
3	9	Regino Hernández	Spain	1:13.67	—	1:13.67	
4	22	Nikolay Olyunin	Olympic Athletes from Russia	1:13.78	—	1:13.78	
5	29	Merlin Surget	France	1:13.82	—	1:13.82	
6	5	Hagen Kearney	United States	1:13.94	—	1:13.94	
7	1	Martin Nörl	Germany	1:14.12	—	1:14.12	
8	17	Kevin Hill	Canada	1:14.24	—	1:14.24	
9	31	Kalle Koblet	Switzerland	1:14.25	—	1:14.25	
10	27	Ken Vuagnoux	France	1:14.29	—	1:14.29	
11	23	Chris Robanske	Canada	1:14.35	—	1:14.35	
11	25	Cameron Bolton	Australia	1:14.35	—	1:14.35	
13	26	Lorenzo Sommariva	Italy	1:14.36	—	1:14.36	
14	11	Paul Berg	Germany	1:14.39	—	1:14.39	
15	10	Nick Baumgartner	United States	1:14.46	—	1:14.46	
16	28	Hanno Douschan	Austria	1:14.53	—	1:14.53	
17	16	Markus Schairer	Austria	1:14.56	—	1:14.56	
18	4	Emanuel Perathoner	Italy	1:14.62	—	1:14.62	
19	21	Jonathan Cheever	United States	1:14.72	—	1:14.72	
20	13	Alex Pullin	Australia	1:14.76	—	1:14.76	
21	33	Jérôme Lymann	Switzerland	1:14.77	—	1:14.77	
22	14	Adam Lambert	Australia	1:14.94	—	1:14.94	
23	30	Anton Lindfors	Finland	1:15.01	—	1:15.01	
24	2	Alessandro Hämmerle	Austria	1:15.03	—	1:15.03	
25	12	Jarryd Hughes	Australia	1:15.69	1:13.73	1:13.73	
26	6	Lucas Eguibar	Spain	1:18.42	1:14.45	1:14.45	
27	3	Mick Dierdorff	United States	1:15.47	1:14.52	1:14.52	
28	19	Michele Godino	Italy	1:20.88	1:14.96	1:14.96	
29	39	Steven Williams	Argentina	1:17.12	1:15.35	1:15.35	
30	32	Lluís Marin Tarroch	Andorra	1:15.47	1:15.37	1:15.37	
31	35	Daniil Dilman	Olympic Athletes from Russia	1:15.40	1:16.11	1:15.40	
32	34	Jan Kubičík	Czech Republic	1:15.73	1:16.25	1:15.73	
33	20	Konstantin Schad	Germany	1:15.73	DNS	1:15.73	
34	38	Éliot Grondin	Canada	1:28.89	1:15.93	1:15.93	
35	36	Loan Bozzolo	France	1:16.15	1:16.11	1:16.11	
36	24	Duncan Campbell	New Zealand	1:16.68	DNF	1:16.68	
37	37	Laro Herrero	Spain	1:17.62	1:16.97	1:16.97	
38	8	Lukas Pachner	Austria	1:16.99	1:17.48	1:16.99	
39	40	Mateusz Ligocki	Poland	1:19.48	1:19.22	1:19.22	
40	18	Baptiste Brochu	Canada	DNS	DNS	DNS	

=== Elimination round ===
The top three finishers from each heat advance to the next round. In the semifinals the first three ranked competitors of each heat proceed to the Big Final. The 4th to 6th ranked competitors of each heat proceed to the Small Final.

==== 1/8 round ====
Heat 1

Rank	Bib	Name	Country	Notes
1	25	Jarryd Hughes	Australia	Q
2	1	Pierre Vaultier	France	Q
3	17	Markus Schairer	Austria	Q
4	16	Hanno Douschan	Austria	
	40	Baptiste Brochu	Canada	DNS

Heat 2

Rank	Bib	Name	Country	Notes
1	24	Alessandro Hämmerle	Austria	Q
2	8	Kevin Hill	Canada	Q
3	9	Kalle Koblet	Switzerland	Q
4	33	Konstantin Schad	Germany	
5	32	Jan Kubičík	Czech Republic	

Heat 3

Rank	Bib	Name	Country	Notes
1	21	Jérôme Lymann	Switzerland	Q
2	12	Cameron Bolton	Australia	Q
3	5	Merlin Surget	France	Q
4	29	Steven Williams	Argentina	
5	36	Duncan Campbell	New Zealand	

Heat 4

Rank	Bib	Name	Country	Notes
1	4	Nikolay Olyunin	Olympic Athletes from Russia	Q
2	20	Alex Pullin	Australia	Q
3	28	Michele Godino	Italy	Q
4	13	Lorenzo Sommariva	Italy	
5	37	Laro Herrero	Spain	

Heat 5

Rank	Bib	Name	Country	Notes
1	27	Mick Dierdorff	United States	Q
2	14	Paul Berg	Germany	Q
3	3	Regino Hernández	Spain	Q
4	19	Jonathan Cheever	United States	
5	37	Lukas Pachner	Austria	

Heat 6

Rank	Bib	Name	Country	Notes
1	6	Hagen Kearney	United States	Q
2	11	Chris Robanske	Canada	Q
3	35	Loan Bozzolo	France	Q
4	22	Adam Lambert	Australia	
5	30	Lluís Marin Tarroch	Andorra	

Heat 7

Rank	Bib	Name	Country	Notes
1	7	Martin Nörl	Germany	Q
2	10	Ken Vuagnoux	France	Q
3	23	Anton Lindfors	Finland	Q
4	31	Daniil Dilman	Olympic Athletes from Russia	
5	34	Éliot Grondin	Canada	

Heat 8

Rank	Bib	Name	Country	Notes
1	18	Emanuel Perathoner	Italy	Q
2	15	Nick Baumgartner	United States	Q
3	39	Mateusz Ligocki	Poland	Q
4	2	Omar Visintin	Italy	
	26	Lucas Eguibar	Spain	DNF

==== Quarterfinals ====
Heat 1

Rank	Bib	Name	Country	Notes
1	1	Pierre Vaultier	France	Q
2	25	Jarryd Hughes	Australia	Q
3	24	Alessandro Hämmerle	Austria	Q
4	8	Kevin Hill	Canada	
	17	Markus Schairer	Austria	DNF
	9	Kalle Koblet	Switzerland	DNF

Heat 2

Rank	Bib	Name	Country	Notes
1	4	Nikolay Olyunin	Olympic Athletes from Russia	Q
2	20	Alex Pullin	Australia	Q
3	12	Cameron Bolton	Australia	Q
4	21	Jérôme Lymann	Switzerland	
	5	Merlin Surget	France	DNF
	28	Michele Godino	Italy	DNF

Heat 3

Rank	Bib	Name	Country	Notes
1	3	Regino Hernández	Spain	Q
2	27	Mick Dierdorff	United States	Q
3	11	Chris Robanske	Canada	Q
4	6	Hagen Kearney	United States	
	14	Paul Berg	Germany	DNF
	35	Loan Bozzolo	France	DNF

Heat 4

Rank	Bib	Name	Country	Notes
1	7	Martin Nörl	Germany	Q
2	15	Nick Baumgartner	United States	Q
3	23	Anton Lindfors	Finland	Q
4	18	Emanuel Perathoner	Italy	
	10	Ken Vuagnoux	France	DNF
	39	Mateusz Ligocki	Poland	DNF

==== Semifinals ====
Semifinal 1

Rank	Bib	Name	Country	Notes
1	20	Alex Pullin	Australia	Q
2	25	Jarryd Hughes	Australia	Q
3	1	Pierre Vaultier	France	Q
4	12	Cameron Bolton	Australia	
5	24	Alessandro Hämmerle	Austria	
	4	Nikolay Olyunin	Olympic Athletes from Russia	DNF

Semifinal 2

Rank	Bib	Name	Country	Notes
1	3	Regino Hernández	Spain	Q
2	15	Nick Baumgartner	United States	Q
3	27	Mick Dierdorff	United States	Q
4	7	Martin Nörl	Germany	
5	23	Anton Lindfors	Finland	
	11	Chris Robanske	Canada	DNF

==== Finals ====
Small final

Rank	Bib	Name	Country	Notes
7	24	Alessandro Hämmerle	Austria	
8	7	Martin Nörl	Germany	
9	23	Anton Lindfors	Finland	
10	12	Cameron Bolton	Australia	
11	4	Nikolay Olyunin	Olympic Athletes from Russia	DNS
11	11	Chris Robanske	Canada	DNS

Big final

Rank	Bib	Name	Country	Notes
1st place, gold medalist(s)	1	Pierre Vaultier	France	
2nd place, silver medalist(s)	25	Jarryd Hughes	Australia	
3rd place, bronze medalist(s)	3	Regino Hernández	Spain	
4	15	Nick Baumgartner	United States	
5	27	Mick Dierdorff	United States	
6	20	Alex Pullin †	Australia	DNF
