= FIS Freestyle Ski and Snowboarding World Championships 2021 – Men's snowboard cross =

Men's snowboard cross at the FIS Freestyle Ski and Snowboarding World Championships 2021
- Location: Idre, Sweden
- Dates: 9 February (qualification); 11 February
- Competitors: 49 from 17 nations

Medalists
gold medal	Lucas Eguibar	Spain
silver medal	Alessandro Hämmerle	Austria
bronze medal	Éliot Grondin	Canada

The Men's snowboard cross competition at the FIS Freestyle Ski and Snowboarding World Championships 2021 was held on 11 February 2021. A qualification was held on 9 February.

== Qualification ==
The qualification was held on 9 February at 10:45.

Rank	Bib	Name	Country	Run 1	Rank	Run 2	Rank	Best	Notes
1	5	Alessandro Hämmerle	Austria	1:17.68	1			1:17.68	Q
2	9	Merlin Surget	France	1:17.90	2			1:17.90	Q
3	13	Lucas Eguibar	Spain	1:18.00	3			1:18.00	Q
4	8	Éliot Grondin	Canada	1:18.09	4			1:18.09	Q
5	19	Kalle Koblet	Switzerland	1:18.50	5			1:18.50	Q
6	15	Hagen Kearney	United States	1:18.60	6			1:18.60	Q
7	6	Yoshiki Takahara	Japan	1:18.99	7			1:18.99	Q
8	14	Martin Nörl	Germany	1:19.14	8			1:19.14	Q
9	11	Adam Lambert	Australia	1:19.14	8			1:19.14	Q
10	10	Jake Vedder	United States	1:19.15	10			1:19.15	Q
11	36	Liam Moffatt	Canada	1:19.33	11			1:19.33	Q
12	7	Glenn de Blois	Netherlands	1:19.47	12			1:19.47	Q
13	23	Lukas Pachner	Austria	1:19.75	13			1:19.75	Q
14	25	Mick Dierdorff	United States	1:19.85	14			1:19.85	Q
15	2	Jakob Dusek	Austria	1:20.01	15			1:20.01	Q
16	26	Jarryd Hughes	Australia	1:20.04	16			1:20.04	Q
17	16	Lorenzo Sommariva	Italy	1:20.80	23	1:16.64	1	1:16.64	q
18	3	Omar Visintin	Italy	1:20.72	22	1:17.66	2	1:17.66	q
19	18	Léo Le Blé Jaques	France	1:20.59	20	1:18.55	3	1:18.55	q
20	12	Paul Berg	Germany	1:20.06	17	1:18.68	4	1:18.68	q
21	24	Loan Bozzolo	France	1:22.75	41	1:18.85	5	1:18.85	q
22	21	Nick Watter	Switzerland	1:21.11	26	1:18.87	6	1:18.87	q
23	28	Kevin Hill	Canada	1:21.10	25	1:19.07	7	1:19.07	q
24	27	Shinya Momono	Japan	1:21.60	34	1:19.08	8	1:19.08	q
25	39	Jan Kubičík	Czech Republic	1:20.41	19	1:19.12	9	1:19.12	q
26	1	Alex Deibold	United States	1:21.64	35	1:19.20	10	1:19.20	q
27	17	Adam Dickson	Australia	1:21.76	38	1:19.21	11	1:19.21	q
28	43	Radek Houser	Czech Republic	1:20.65	21	1:19.28	12	1:19.28	q
29	35	Michele Godino	Italy	Did not finish		1:19.36	13	1:19.36	q
30	4	David Pickl	Austria	1:21.88	40	1:19.52	14	1:19.52	q
31	42	Daniil Dilman	Russian Ski Federation	1:21.30	30	1:19.73	15	1:19.73	q
32	48	Jakub Žerava	Czech Republic	1:21.26	29	1:19.88	16	1:19.88	q
33	32	Nicola Lubasch	Switzerland	1:29.65	48	1:19.89	17	1:19.89	
34	20	Senna Leith	United States	1:21.22	27	1:20.02	18	1:20.02	
35	34	Umito Kirchwehm	Germany	1:24.33	44	1:20.05	19	1:20.05	
36	29	Quentin Sodogas	France	1:20.27	18	1:20.08	20	1:20.08	
37	31	Colby Graham	Canada	1:21.46	31	1:20.12	21	1:20.12	
38	30	Leon Beckhaus	Germany	1:21.69	36	1:20.19	22	1:20.19	
39	40	Woo Jin	South Korea	1:21.75	37	1:20.20	23	1:20.20	
40	33	Regino Hernández	Spain	1:21.25	28	1:20.31	24	1:20.31	
41	38	Andrey Anisimov	Russian Ski Federation	1:21.49	32	1:20.83	25	1:20.83	
42	45	Álvaro Romero	Spain	1:20.87	24	Did not finish		1:20.87	
43	37	Steven Williams	Argentina	1:21.51	33	1:21.09	26	1:21.09	
44	41	Daniil Donskikh	Russian Ski Federation	1:23.48	42	1:21.66	27	1:21.66	
45	22	Filippo Ferrari	Italy	1:21.77	39	Did not finish		1:21.77	
46	46	Bernat Ribera	Spain	1:24.85	45	1:22.80	28	1:22.80	
47	44	Noah Bethonico	Brazil	1:23.68	43	1:25.28	30	1:23.68	
48	49	Anton Karpov	Ukraine	1:26.31	46	1:24.80	29	1:24.80	
49	47	Roman Aleksandrovskyy	Ukraine	1:28.35	47	1:27.60	31	1:27.60	
	50	Victor-Segundo Chávez	Peru	Did not start					

== Elimination round ==
=== 1/8 finals ===
Heat 1

Rank	Bib	Name	Country	Notes
1	16	Jarryd Hughes	Australia	Q
2	1	Alessandro Hämmerle	Austria	Q
3	17	Lorenzo Sommariva	Italy	
4	32	Jakub Žerava	Czech Republic	

Heat 3

Rank	Bib	Name	Country	Notes
1	5	Kalle Koblet	Switzerland	Q
2	12	Glenn de Blois	Netherlands	Q
3	21	Loan Bozzolo	France	
4	28	Radek Houser	Czech Republic	

Heat 5

Rank	Bib	Name	Country	Notes
1	3	Lucas Eguibar	Spain	Q
2	19	Léo Le Blé Jaques	France	Q
3	14	Mick Dierdorff	United States	
4	30	David Pickl	Austria	

Heat 7

Rank	Bib	Name	Country	Notes
1	10	Jake Vedder	United States	Q
2	23	Kevin Hill	Canada	Q
3	26	Alex Deibold	United States	
4	7	Yoshiki Takahara	Japan	

Heat 2

Rank	Bib	Name	Country	Notes
1	8	Martin Nörl	Germany	Q
2	24	Shinya Momono	Japan	Q
3	25	Jan Kubičík	Czech Republic	
4	9	Adam Lambert	Austria	

Heat 4

Rank	Bib	Name	Country	Notes
1	4	Éliot Grondin	Canada	Q
2	20	Paul Berg	Germany	Q
3	13	Lukas Pachner	Austria	
4	29	Michele Godino	Italy	

Heat 6

Rank	Bib	Name	Country	Notes
1	6	Hagen Kearney	United States	Q
2	11	Liam Moffatt	Canada	Q
3	27	Adam Dickson	Australia	
4	22	Nick Watter	Switzerland	

Heat 8

Rank	Bib	Name	Country	Notes
1	2	Merlin Surget	France	Q
2	15	Jakob Dusek	Austria	Q
3	18	Omar Visintin	Italy	
4	31	Daniil Dilman	Russian Ski Federation	

=== Quarterfinals ===
Heat 1

Rank	Bib	Name	Country	Notes
1	1	Alessandro Hämmerle	Austria	Q
2	8	Martin Nörl	Germany	Q
3	16	Jarryd Hughes	Australia	
4	24	Shinya Momono	Japan	

Heat 3

Rank	Bib	Name	Country	Notes
1	3	Lucas Eguibar	Spain	Q
2	11	Liam Moffatt	Canada	Q
3	19	Léo Le Blé Jaques	France	
4	6	Hagen Kearney	United States	

Heat 2

Rank	Bib	Name	Country	Notes
1	4	Éliot Grondin	Canada	Q
2	20	Paul Berg	Germany	Q
3	12	Glenn de Blois	Netherlands	
4	5	Kalle Koblet	Switzerland	

Heat 4

Rank	Bib	Name	Country	Notes
1	15	Jakob Dusek	Austria	Q
2	2	Merlin Surget	France	Q
3	10	Jake Vedder	United States	
4	23	Kevin Hill	Canada	

=== Semifinals ===
Heat 1

Rank	Bib	Name	Country	Notes
1	1	Alessandro Hämmerle	Austria	Q
2	4	Éliot Grondin	Canada	Q
3	8	Martin Nörl	Germany	
4	20	Paul Berg	Germany	

Heat 2

Rank	Bib	Name	Country	Notes
1	15	Jakob Dusek	Austria	Q
2	3	Lucas Eguibar	Spain	Q
3	2	Merlin Surget	France	
4	11	Liam Moffatt	Canada	

=== Finals ===
==== Small final ====
Rank	Bib	Name	Country	Notes
5	8	Martin Nörl	Germany	
6	20	Paul Berg	Germany	
7	11	Liam Moffatt	Canada	
8	2	Merlin Surget	France	

==== Big final ====
Rank	Bib	Name	Country	Notes
1st place, gold medalist(s)	3	Lucas Eguibar	Spain	
2nd place, silver medalist(s)	1	Alessandro Hämmerle	Austria	
3rd place, bronze medalist(s)	4	Éliot Grondin	Canada	
4	15	Jakob Dusek	Austria	
