= Snowboarding at the 2022 Winter Olympics – Men's snowboard cross =

Men's snowboard cross at the XXIV Olympic Winter Games
- Snowboarding
- Venue: Genting Snow Park, Zhangjiakou
- Date: 10 February
- Competitors: 31 from 13 nations

Medalists
1st place, gold medalist(s)		Alessandro Hämmerle	Austria
2nd place, silver medalist(s)		Éliot Grondin	Canada
3rd place, bronze medalist(s)		Omar Visintin	Italy

The men's snowboard cross competition in snowboarding at the 2022 Winter Olympics was held on 10 February, at the Genting Snow Park in Zhangjiakou. Alessandro Hämmerle of Austria became the champion. Éliot Grondin of Canada won the silver medal, and Omar Visintin of Italy the bronze. For all of them, this was the first Olympic medal.

== Summary ==
The 2014 and 2018 champion, Pierre Vaultier, retired from competitions. The 2018 silver medalist, Jarryd Hughes, qualified for the Olympics. The bronze medalist, Regino Hernández, did not qualify and retired as professional rider in January 2022. At the 2021–22 FIS Snowboard World Cup, six snowboard cross events were held before the Olympics. Martin Nörl was leading the ranking, followed by Alessandro Hämmerle and Jakob Dusek. Lucas Eguibar is the 2021 world champion, with Hämmerle and Éliot Grondin being the silver and bronze medalists, respectively.

== Qualification ==
A total of 32 snowboarders qualified to compete at the games. For an athlete to compete they must have a minimum of 100.00 FIS points on the FIS Points List on January 17, 2022 and a top 30 finish in a World Cup event or at the FIS Snowboard World Championships 2021. A country could enter a maximum of four athletes into the event.

== Results ==
=== Seeding run ===
The seeding run was held at 11:15.

Rank	Bib	Name	Country	Run 1	Run 2	Best
1	15	Éliot Grondin	Canada	1:16.29	–	1:16.29
2	7	Julian Lüftner	Austria	1:17.00	–	1:17.00
3	13	Jakob Dusek	Austria	1:17.05	–	1:17.05
4	2	Alessandro Hämmerle	Austria	1:17.24	–	1:17.24
5	11	Martin Nörl	Germany	1:17.38	–	1:17.38
6	16	Omar Visintin	Italy	1:17.68	–	1:17.68
7	8	Hagen Kearney	United States	1:17.81	–	1:17.81
8	4	Cameron Bolton	Australia	1:17.92	–	1:17.92
9	3	Lorenzo Sommariva	Italy	1:17.98	–	1:17.98
10	12	Nick Baumgartner	United States	1:18.01	–	1:18.01
11	23	Umito Kirchwehm	Germany	1:18.22	–	1:18.22
12	19	Paul Berg	Germany	1:18.31	–	1:18.31
13	20	Liam Moffatt	Canada	1:18.45	–	1:18.45
14	9	Lukas Pachner	Austria	1:18.49	–	1:18.49
15	17	Adam Dickson	Australia	1:18.56	–	1:18.56
16	6	Merlin Surget	France	1:18.64	–	1:18.64
17	10	Adam Lambert	Australia	1:19.33	1:17.56	1:17.56
18	25	Jake Vedder	United States	1:18.83	1:17.88	1:17.88
19	18	Tommaso Leoni	Italy	1:19.45	1:18.13	1:18.13
20	24	Mick Dierdorff	United States	1:19.66	1:18.64	1:18.64
21	14	Lucas Eguibar	Spain	1:18.73	1:19.93	1:18.73
22	5	Kalle Koblet	Switzerland	1:19.39	1:18.94	1:18.94
23	21	Yoshiki Takahara	Japan	1:19.26	1:19.16	1:19.16
24	22	Loan Bozzolo	France	1:19.75	1:19.23	1:19.23
25	30	Daniil Donskikh	ROC	1:19.36	1:19.93	1:19.36
26	28	Kevin Hill	Canada	1:20.24	1:19.45	1:19.45
27	1	Glenn de Blois	Netherlands	1:20.75	1:19.69	1:19.69
28	29	Jarryd Hughes	Australia	1:21.28	1:20.48	1:20.48
29	31	Huw Nightingale	Great Britain	1:20.79	1:20.72	1:20.72
30	26	Léo Le Blé Jaques	France	1:21.06	1:21.36	1:21.06
31	27	Filippo Ferrari	Italy	1:24.77	DNF	1:24.77
32	32	Radek Houser	Czech Republic	DNS	DNS	DNS

=== Elimination round ===
==== 1/8 finals ====
Heat 1

Rank	Bib	Name	Country	Notes
1	1	Éliot Grondin	Canada	Q
2	16	Merlin Surget	France	Q
3	17	Adam Lambert	Australia	
	32	Radek Houser	Czech Republic	DNS

Heat 2

Rank	Bib	Name	Country	Notes
1	8	Cameron Bolton	Australia	Q
2	24	Loan Bozzolo	France	Q
3	25	Daniil Donskikh	ROC	
	9	Lorenzo Sommariva	Italy	DNF

Heat 3

Rank	Bib	Name	Country	Notes
1	5	Martin Nörl	Germany	Q
2	21	Lucas Eguibar	Spain	Q
3	12	Paul Berg	Germany	
4	28	Jarryd Hughes	Australia	

Heat 4

Rank	Bib	Name	Country	Notes
1	20	Mick Dierdorff	United States	Q
2	4	Alessandro Hämmerle	Austria	Q
3	13	Liam Moffatt	Canada	
4	29	Huw Nightingale	Great Britain	

Heat 5

Rank	Bib	Name	Country	Notes
1	19	Tommaso Leoni	Italy	Q
2	30	Léo Le Blé Jaques	France	Q
3	14	Lukas Pachner	Austria	
4	3	Jakob Dusek	Austria	

Heat 6

Rank	Bib	Name	Country	Notes
1	6	Omar Visintin	Italy	Q
2	11	Umito Kirchwehm	Germany	Q
3	22	Kalle Koblet	Switzerland	
4	27	Glenn de Blois	Netherlands	

Heat 7

Rank	Bib	Name	Country	Notes
1	23	Yoshiki Takahara	Japan	Q
2	10	Nick Baumgartner	United States	Q
3	7	Hagen Kearney	United States	
4	26	Kevin Hill	Canada	

Heat 8

Rank	Bib	Name	Country	Notes
1	18	Jake Vedder	United States	Q
2	2	Julian Lüftner	Austria	Q
3	15	Adam Dickson	Australia	
	31	Filippo Ferrari	Italy	DNS

==== Quarterfinals ====
Heat 1

Rank	Bib	Name	Country	Notes
1	1	Éliot Grondin	Canada	Q
2	16	Merlin Surget	France	Q
3	24	Loan Bozzolo	France	
4	8	Cameron Bolton	Australia	

Heat 2

Rank	Bib	Name	Country	Notes
1	4	Alessandro Hämmerle	Austria	Q
2	21	Lucas Eguibar	Spain	Q
	20	Mick Dierdorff	United States	DNF
	5	Martin Nörl	Germany	DNF

Heat 3

Rank	Bib	Name	Country	Notes
1	6	Omar Visintin	Italy	Q
2	19	Tommaso Leoni	Italy	Q
3	30	Léo Le Blé Jaques	France	
	11	Umito Kirchwehm	Germany	DNF

Heat 4

Rank	Bib	Name	Country	Notes
1	2	Julian Lüftner	Austria	Q
2	18	Jake Vedder	United States	Q
3	10	Nick Baumgartner	United States	
	23	Yoshiki Takahara	Japan	DNF

==== Semifinals ====
Heat 1

Rank	Bib	Name	Country	Notes
1	1	Éliot Grondin	Canada	Q
2	4	Alessandro Hämmerle	Austria	Q
3	16	Merlin Surget	France	
4	21	Lucas Eguibar	Spain	

Heat 2

Rank	Bib	Name	Country	Notes
1	2	Julian Lüftner	Austria	Q
2	6	Omar Visintin	Italy	Q
3	18	Jake Vedder	United States	
4	19	Tommaso Leoni	Italy	

==== Finals ====
Small final

Rank	Bib	Name	Country	Notes
5	16	Merlin Surget	France	
6	18	Jake Vedder	United States	
7	21	Lucas Eguibar	Spain	
8	19	Tommaso Leoni	Italy	

Big final

Rank	Bib	Name	Country	Notes
1st place, gold medalist(s)	4	Alessandro Hämmerle	Austria	
2nd place, silver medalist(s)	1	Éliot Grondin	Canada	
3rd place, bronze medalist(s)	6	Omar Visintin	Italy	
4	2	Julian Lüftner	Austria	
