= Snowboarding at the 2026 Winter Olympics – Men's snowboard cross =

Men's snowboard cross at the XXV Olympic Winter Games
- Snowboarding
- Venue: Livigno Snow Park, Valtellina
- Date: 12 February

Medalists
1st place, gold medalist(s)		Alessandro Hämmerle	Austria
2nd place, silver medalist(s)		Éliot Grondin	Canada
3rd place, bronze medalist(s)		Jakob Dusek	Austria

The men's snowboard cross competition in snowboarding at the 2026 Winter Olympics will be held on 12 February, at the Livigno Snow Park in Valtellina. Alessandro Hämmerle of Austria won the event and Éliot Grondin of Canada won the silver medal. They replicated their 2022 performance. Jakob Dusek of Austria won bronze, his first Olympic medal.

== Background ==
The defending champion, Alessandro Hämmerle, qualified for the event, as did the 2022 silver medalist Éliot Grondin and the bronze medalist Omar Visintin. Adam Lambert was leading the 2025–26 FIS Snowboard World Cup standings in snowboard cross. He was the 2025 World champion as well.

== Results ==
=== Seeding run ===
Rank	Bib	Name	Country	Run 1	Run 2	Best
1	15	Aidan Chollet	France	1:06.37	–	1:06.37
2	7	Éliot Grondin	Canada	1:06.75	–	1:06.75
3	2	Leon Ulbricht	Germany	1:07.94	–	1:07.94
4	17	Jonas Chollet	France	1:08.04	–	1:08.04
5	6	Loan Bozzolo	France	1:08.22	–	1:08.22
6	14	Lorenzo Sommariva	Italy	1:08.52	–	1:08.52
7	13	Alessandro Hämmerle	Austria	1:08.56	–	1:08.56
8	21	Glenn de Blois	Netherlands	1:08.68	–	1:08.68
9	10	Jakob Dusek	Austria	1:08.69	–	1:08.69
10	26	Huw Nightingale	Great Britain	1:08.75	–	1:08.75
11	23	Evan Bichon	Canada	1:08.92	–	1:08.92
12	8	Lucas Eguibar Bretón	Spain	1:08.97	–	1:08.97
13	9	Nathan Pare	United States	1:09.07	–	1:09.07
14	5	Martin Nörl	Germany	1:09.09	–	1:09.09
15	18	Kalle Koblet	Switzerland	1:09.40	–	1:09.40
16	30	Niels Konradt	Germany	1:09.43	–	1:09.43
17	27	David Pickl	Austria	1:09.46	–	1:09.46
18	3	Lukas Pachner	Austria	1:09.75	–	1:09.75
19	24	Liam Moffatt	Canada	1:09.76	–	1:09.76
20	19	Omar Visintin	Italy	1:09.87	–	1:09.87
21	12	Adam Lambert	Australia	1:10.10	1:08.64	1:08.64
22	1	Nick Baumgartner	United States	1:10.36	1:08.79	1:08.79
23	11	Jake Vedder	United States	1:10.18	1:08.96	1:08.96
24	22	Krystof Choura	Czech Republic	1:10.22	1:09.24	1:09.24
25	20	Jarryd Hughes	Australia	1:10.49	1:09.36	1:09.36
26	25	Cody Winters	United States	1:10.02	1:09.62	1:09.62
27	28	Filippo Ferrari	Italy	1:10.10	1:09.69	1:09.69
28	29	Alvaro Romero Villanueva	Spain	DNF	1:09.93	1:09.93
29	16	Radek Houser	Czech Republic	1:10.33	1:10.36	
30	32	James Johnstone	Australia	1:11.54	1:11.07	1:11.07
31	31	Julius Reichle	Germany	DNF	1:11.64	1:11.64
32	4	Merlin Surget	France	1:11.47	1:15.89	

=== Elimination round ===
- Q — Qualified for the next round
- RAL — Ranked last

==== 1/8 finals ====
Heat 1

Rank	Bib	Name	Country	Notes
1	32	Merlin Surget	France	Q
2	1	Aidan Chollet	France	Q
3	17	David Pickl	Austria	
4	16	Niels Konradt	Germany	

Heat 2

Rank	Bib	Name	Country	Notes
1	9	Jakob Dusek	Austria	Q
2	24	Krystof Choura	Czech Republic	Q
3	25	Jarryd Hughes	Australia	
4	8	Glenn de Blois	Netherlands	

Heat 3

Rank	Bib	Name	Country	Notes
1	5	Loan Bozzolo	France	Q
2	12	Lucas Eguibar Bretón	Spain	Q
3	28	Alvaro Romero Villanueva	Spain	
4	21	Adam Lambert	Australia	

Heat 4

Rank	Bib	Name	Country	Notes
1	4	Jonas Chollet	France	Q
2	13	Nathan Pare	United States	Q
3	20	Omar Visintin	Italy	
4	29	Radek Houser	Czech Republic	

Heat 5

Rank	Bib	Name	Country	Notes
1	3	Leon Ulbricht	Germany	Q
2	14	Martin Nörl	Germany	Q
3	30	James Johnstone	Australia	
4	19	Liam Moffatt	Canada	

Heat 6

Rank	Bib	Name	Country	Notes
1	22	Nick Baumgartner	United States	Q
2	6	Lorenzo Sommariva	Italy	Q
3	11	Evan Bichon	Canada	
4	27	Filippo Ferrari	Italy	

Heat 7

Rank	Bib	Name	Country	Notes
1	7	Alessandro Hämmerle	Austria	Q
2	23	Jake Vedder	United States	Q
3	26	Cody Winters	United States	
4	10	Huw Nightingale	Great Britain	

Heat 8

Rank	Bib	Name	Country	Notes
1	2	Éliot Grondin	Canada	Q
2	15	Kalle Koblet	Switzerland	Q
3	18	Lukas Pachner	Austria	
4	31	Julius Reichle	Germany	

==== Quarterfinals ====
Heat 1

Rank	Bib	Name	Country	Notes
1	9	Jakob Dusek	Austria	Q
2	1	Aidan Chollet	France	Q
3	32	Merlin Surget	France	
4	24	Krystof Choura	Czech Republic	

Heat 2

Rank	Bib	Name	Country	Notes
1	4	Jonas Chollet	France	Q
2	5	Loan Bozzolo	France	Q
3	12	Lucas Eguibar Bretón	Spain	
	13	Nathan Pare	United States	RAL

Heat 3

Rank	Bib	Name	Country	Notes
1	6	Lorenzo Sommariva	Italy	Q
2	22	Nick Baumgartner	United States	Q
3	14	Martin Nörl	Germany	
	3	Leon Ulbricht	Germany	DNF

Heat 4

Rank	Bib	Name	Country	Notes
1	2	Éliot Grondin	Canada	Q
2	7	Alessandro Hämmerle	Austria	Q
3	23	Jake Vedder	United States	
4	15	Kalle Koblet	Switzerland	

==== Semifinals ====
Heat 1

Rank	Bib	Name	Country	Notes
1	1	Aidan Chollet	France	Q
2	9	Jakob Dusek	Austria	Q
3	4	Jonas Chollet	France	
4	5	Loan Bozzolo	France	

Heat 2

Rank	Bib	Name	Country	Notes
1	2	Éliot Grondin	Canada	Q
2	7	Alessandro Hämmerle	Austria	Q
3	22	Nick Baumgartner	United States	
4	6	Lorenzo Sommariva	Italy	

==== Finals ====
Small final

Rank	Bib	Name	Country	Notes
5	5	Loan Bozzolo	France	
6	4	Jonas Chollet	France	
7	22	Nick Baumgartner	United States	
8	6	Lorenzo Sommariva	Italy	

Big final

Rank	Bib	Name	Country	Notes
1st place, gold medalist(s)	7	Alessandro Hämmerle	Austria	
2nd place, silver medalist(s)	2	Éliot Grondin	Canada	
3rd place, bronze medalist(s)	9	Jakob Dusek	Austria	
4	1	Aidan Chollet	France	
