= 2020–21 FIS Snowboard World Cup =

International snowboarding competition

Discipline	Men	Women
Parallel overall	(Italy) Aaron March (1)	(Germany) Ramona Theresia Hofmeister (2)
Parallel slalom	(Italy) Aaron March (2)	(Switzerland) Julie Zogg (4)
Parallel giant slalom	(Italy) Roland Fischnaller (2)	(Germany) Ramona Theresia Hofmeister (2)
Snowboard cross	(Austria) Alessandro Hämmerle (3)	(Czech Republic) Eva Samková (3)
Freestyle overall	(Norway) Marcus Kleveland (1)	(Austria) Anna Gasser (2)
Halfpipe	(Japan) Yūto Totsuka (3)	(United States) Chloe Kim (3)
Slopestyle	(Norway) Marcus Kleveland (1)	(Austria) Anna Gasser (1)
Big Air	(Canada) Maxence Parrot (2)	(New Zealand) Zoi Sadowski-Synnott (1)
- Nations Cup Overall: Austria (2)

Competition
Locations	18 venues	18 venues
Individual	21 events	21 events
Team	2/2	2/2

The 2020–21 FIS Snowboard World Cup was the 27th World Cup season in snowboarding organised by International Ski Federation. The season started on 12 December 2020 and concluded on 28 March 2021. Competitions consisted of parallel slalom, parallel giant slalom, snowboard cross, halfpipe, slopestyle and big air.

== Men ==
=== Snowboard Cross ===
Season	Date	Place	Event	Winner	Second	Third
	19 December 2020	(Italy) Cervinia	SBX	Cancelled		
	15 January 2021	(Austria) Montafon	SBX	Cancelled		
1	23 January 2021	(Italy) Chiesa	SBX	(Netherlands) Glenn de Blois	(Canada) Éliot Grondin	(Italy) Lorenzo Sommariva
2	24 January 2021	(Italy) Chiesa	SBX	(Austria) Alessandro Hämmerle	(France) Merlin Surget	(United States) Hagen Kearney
	29 January 2021	(France) Saint-Lary-Soulan	SBX	Cancelled		
	6 February 2021	(Germany) Feldberg	SBX	Cancelled		
	13 February 2021	(Czech Republic) Dolní Morava	SBX	Cancelled		
FIS Freestyle Ski and Snowboarding World Championships 2021 (11–13 February)
3	18 February 2021	(Austria) Reiteralm	SBX	(Austria) Alessandro Hämmerle	(Spain) Lucas Eguibar	(United States) Mick Dierdorff
4	4 March 2021	(Georgia (country)) Bakuriani	SBX	(Canada) Éliot Grondin	(Austria) Lukas Pachner	(Italy) Lorenzo Sommariva
5	5 March 2021	(Georgia (country)) Bakuriani	SBX	(Italy) Omar Visintin	(Switzerland) Kalle Koblet	(Austria) Alessandro Hämmerle
6	20 March 2021	(Switzerland) Veysonnaz	SBX	(Austria) Alessandro Hämmerle	(United States) Hagen Kearney	(France) Merlin Surget

=== Parallel ===
Season	Date	Place	Event	Winner	Second	Third
1	12 December 2020	(Italy) Cortina d'Ampezzo	PGS	(Italy) Roland Fischnaller	(Italy) Aaron March	(Austria) Benjamin Karl
2	17 December 2020	(Italy) Carezza	PGS	(Austria) Benjamin Karl	(Austria) Andreas Prommegger	(Slovenia) Žan Košir
3	9 January 2021	(Switzerland) Scuol	PGS	(Russia) Igor Sluev	(Poland) Michał Nowaczyk	(Slovenia) Tim Mastnak
4	12 January 2021	(Austria) Bad Gastein	PSL	(Italy) Aaron March	(Russia) Dmitry Loginov	(Austria) Andreas Prommegger
5	30 January 2021	(Russia) Moscow	PSL	(Russia) Dmitry Karlagachev	(Slovenia) Žan Košir	(Italy) Edwin Coratti
6	6 February 2021	(Russia) Lake Bannoye	PGS	(Russia) Dmitry Loginov	(Russia) Igor Sluev	(Italy) Mirko Felicetti
7	7 February 2021	(Russia) Lake Bannoye	PSL	(Russia) Dmitry Loginov	(Russia) Stepan Naumov	(Russia) Andrey Sobolev
	13 February 2021	(South Korea) Pyeongchang	PGS	Cancelled		
	14 February 2021	(South Korea) Pyeongchang	PGS	Cancelled		
FIS Freestyle Ski and Snowboarding World Championships 2021 (1–2 March)
8	6 March 2021	(Slovenia) Rogla	PGS	(Slovenia) Žan Košir	(Russia) Andrey Sobolev	(Poland) Oskar Kwiatkowski
	13 March 2021	(Italy) Piancavallo	PSL	Cancelled		
9	20 March 2021	(Germany) Berchtesgaden	PSL	(Italy) Aaron March	(Austria) Alexander Payer	(Austria) Arvid Auner

=== Halfpipe ===
Season	Date	Place	Event	Winner	Second	Third
	18 December 2020	(United States) Copper Mountain	HP	Cancelled		
1	23 January 2021	(Switzerland) Laax	HP	(Japan) Yūto Totsuka	(Australia) Scotty James	(Japan) Ruka Hirano
	6 February 2021	(United States) Mammoth Mountain	HP	Cancelled		
FIS Freestyle Ski and Snowboarding World Championships 2021 (10–16 March)
	13 March 2021	(Canada) Calgary	HP	Cancelled		
2	21 March 2021	(United States) Aspen	HP	(Japan) Yūto Totsuka	(Japan) Raibu Katayama	(Germany) André Höflich

=== Slopestyle ===
Season	Date	Place	Event	Winner	Second	Third
	15 January 2021	(Italy) Seiser Alm	SS	Cancelled		
1	22 January 2021	(Switzerland) Laax	SS	(Sweden) Niklas Mattsson	(Germany) Leon Vockensperger	(Norway) Marcus Kleveland
	5 February 2021	(United States) Mammoth Mountain	SS	Cancelled		
FIS Freestyle Ski and Snowboarding World Championships 2021 (10–16 March)
	12 March 2021	(Canada) Calgary	SS	Cancelled		
2	20 March 2021	(United States) Aspen	SS	(Norway) Marcus Kleveland	(United States) Red Gerard	(Canada) Mark McMorris
3	28 March 2021	(Switzerland) Silvaplana	SS	(Norway) Marcus Kleveland	(Canada) Liam Brearley	(United States) Chris Corning

=== Big Air ===
Season	Date	Place	Event	Winner	Second	Third
	19 December 2020	(United States) Copper Mountain	HP	Cancelled		
1	8 January 2021	(Austria) Kreischberg	BA	(Canada) Maxence Parrot	(Sweden) Sven Thorgren	(Norway) Mons Røisland
FIS Freestyle Ski and Snowboarding World Championships 2021 (10–16 March)

== Ladies ==
=== Snowboard Cross ===
Season	Date	Place	Event	Winner	Second	Third
	19 December 2020	(Italy) Cervinia	SBX	Cancelled		
	15 January 2021	(Austria) Montafon	SBX	Cancelled		
1	23 January 2021	(Italy) Chiesa	SBX	(Italy) Michela Moioli	(United States) Faye Gulini	(Czech Republic) Eva Samková
2	24 January 2021	(Italy) Chiesa	SBX	(Czech Republic) Eva Samková	(United States) Faye Gulini	(France) Julia Pereira de Sousa Mabileau
	29 January 2021	(France) Saint-Lary-Soulan	SBX	Cancelled		
	6 February 2021	(Germany) Feldberg	SBX	Cancelled		
	13 February 2021	(Czech Republic) Dolní Morava	SBX	Cancelled		
FIS Freestyle Ski and Snowboarding World Championships 2021 (11–13 February)
3	18 February 2021	(Austria) Reiteralm	SBX	(Italy) Michela Moioli	(United States) Lindsey Jacobellis	(France) Chloé Trespeuch
4	4 March 2021	(Georgia (country)) Bakuriani	SBX	(Czech Republic) Eva Samková	(France) Julia Pereira de Sousa Mabileau	(United States) Lindsey Jacobellis
5	5 March 2021	(Georgia (country)) Bakuriani	SBX	(United Kingdom) Charlotte Bankes	(France) Chloé Trespeuch	(United States) Faye Gulini
6	20 March 2021	(Switzerland) Veysonnaz	SBX	(Czech Republic) Eva Samková	(Italy) Michela Moioli	(United Kingdom) Charlotte Bankes

=== Parallel ===
Season	Date	Place	Event	Winner	Second	Third
1	12 December 2020	(Italy) Cortina d'Ampezzo	PGS	(Czech Republic) Ester Ledecká	(Germany) Selina Jörg	(Germany) Ramona Theresia Hofmeister
2	17 December 2020	(Italy) Carezza	PGS	(Germany) Ramona Theresia Hofmeister	(Switzerland) Ladina Jenny	(Germany) Selina Jörg
3	9 January 2021	(Switzerland) Scuol	PGS	(Russia) Sofia Nadyrshina	(Germany) Ramona Theresia Hofmeister	(Switzerland) Julie Zogg
4	12 January 2021	(Austria) Bad Gastein	PSL	(Russia) Sofia Nadyrshina	(Germany) Cheyenne Loch	(Germany) Selina Jörg
5	30 January 2021	(Russia) Moscow	PSL	(Austria) Daniela Ulbing	(Russia) Sofia Nadyrshina	(Germany) Ramona Theresia Hofmeister
6	6 February 2021	(Russia) Lake Bannoye	PGS	(Germany) Ramona Theresia Hofmeister	(Germany) Cheyenne Loch	(Austria) Sabine Schöffmann
7	7 February 2021	(Russia) Lake Bannoye	PSL	(Switzerland) Julie Zogg	(Germany) Cheyenne Loch	(Japan) Tomoka Takeuchi
	13 February 2021	(South Korea) Pyeongchang	PGS	Cancelled		
	14 February 2021	(South Korea) Pyeongchang	PGS	Cancelled		
FIS Freestyle Ski and Snowboarding World Championships 2021 (1–2 March)
8	6 March 2021	(Slovenia) Rogla	PGS	(Germany) Ramona Theresia Hofmeister	(Russia) Sofia Nadyrshina	(Switzerland) Julie Zogg
	13 March 2021	(Italy) Piancavallo	PSL	Cancelled		
9	20 March 2021	(Germany) Berchtesgaden	PSL	(Switzerland) Julie Zogg	(Germany) Selina Jörg	(Germany) Carolin Langenhorst

=== Halfpipe ===
Season	Date	Place	Event	Winner	Second	Third
	18 December 2020	(United States) Copper Mountain	HP	Cancelled		
1	23 January 2021	(Switzerland) Laax	HP	(United States) Chloe Kim	(Japan) Mitsuki Ono	(Japan) Sena Tomita
	6 February 2021	(United States) Mammoth Mountain	HP	Cancelled		
FIS Freestyle Ski and Snowboarding World Championships 2021 (10–16 March)
	13 March 2021	(Canada) Calgary	HP	Cancelled		
2	21 March 2021	(United States) Aspen	HP	(United States) Chloe Kim	(Spain) Queralt Castellet	(Japan) Sena Tomita

=== Slopestyle ===
Season	Date	Place	Event	Winner	Second	Third
	15 January 2021	(Italy) Seiser Alm	SS	Cancelled		
1	22 January 2021	(Switzerland) Laax	SS	(United States) Jamie Anderson	(New Zealand) Zoi Sadowski-Synnott	(Australia) Tess Coady
	5 February 2021	(United States) Mammoth Mountain	SS	Cancelled		
FIS Freestyle Ski and Snowboarding World Championships 2021 (10–16 March)
	12 March 2021	(Canada) Calgary	SS	Cancelled		
2	20 March 2021	(United States) Aspen	SS	(Austria) Anna Gasser	(United States) Hailey Langland	(Finland) Enni Rukajärvi
3	28 March 2021	(Switzerland) Silvaplana	SS	(Japan) Reira Iwabuchi	(Japan) Kokomo Murase	(Australia) Tess Coady

=== Big Air ===
Season	Date	Place	Event	Winner	Second	Third
	19 December 2020	(United States) Copper Mountain	HP	Cancelled		
1	8 January 2021	(Austria) Kreischberg	BA	(New Zealand) Zoi Sadowski-Synnott	(Japan) Kokomo Murase	(Austria) Anna Gasser
FIS Freestyle Ski and Snowboarding World Championships 2021 (10–16 March)

== Team ==
=== Parallel mixed ===
Season	Date	Place	Event	Winner	Second	Third
1	12 January 2021	(Austria) Bad Gastein	PSL_{M}	Austria I Andreas Prommegger; Claudia Riegler	Germany I Stefan Baumeister; Cheyenne Loch	Russia I Dmitry Loginov; Sofia Nadyrshina
	7 March 2021	(Italy) Livigno	PSL_{M}	Cancelled		
	14 March 2021	(Italy) Piancavallo	PSL_{M}	Cancelled		
2	21 March 2021	(Germany) Berchtesgaden	PSL_{M}	Russia I Dmitry Loginov; Sofia Nadyrshina	Switzerland I Dario Caviezel; Julie Zogg	Germany IV Stefan Baumeister; Selina Jörg

=== Snowboard team ===
Season	Date	Place	Event	Winner	Second	Third
	24 January 2021	(Italy) Bergamo	SBT_{M}	Cancelled		
	31 January 2021	(France) Saint-Lary-Soulan	SBT_{M}	Cancelled		
	7 February 2021	(Germany) Feldberg	SBT_{M}	Cancelled		
	14 February 2021	(Czech Republic) Dolní Morava	SBT_{M}	Cancelled		

== Men's standings ==
=== Parallel overall (PSL/PGS) ===
Rank	after all 9 races	Points
1	(Italy) Aaron March	424
2	(Austria) Andreas Prommegger	339
3	(Russia) Dmitry Loginov	333
4	(Slovenia) Žan Košir	329
5	(Austria) Alexander Payer	295

=== Parallel slalom ===
Rank	after all 4 races	Points
1	(Italy) Aaron March	258
2	(Russia) Dmitry Loginov	191
3	(Russia) Dmitry Karlagachev	187
4	(Austria) Alexander Payer	184
5	(Austria) Andreas Prommegger	159

=== Parallel giant slalom ===
Rank	after all 5 races	Points
1	(Italy) Roland Fischnaller	215
2	(Russia) Igor Sluev	214
3	(Austria) Benjamin Karl	213
4	(Slovenia) Žan Košir	205
5	(Austria) Andreas Prommegger	180

=== Snowboard Cross ===
Rank	after all 6 races	Points
1	(Austria) Alessandro Hämmerle	430
2	(Canada) Éliot Grondin	304
3	(France) Merlin Surget	252
4	(Netherlands) Glenn de Blois	247
5	(United States) Hagen Kearney	246

=== Freestyle overall (BA/SS/HP) ===
Rank	after all 6 races	Points
1	(Norway) Marcus Kleveland	260
2	(Japan) Yūto Totsuka	200
3	(Canada) Liam Brearley	152
4	(Canada) Maxence Parrot	150
5	(Sweden) Sven Thorgren	124

=== Halfpipe ===
Rank	after all 2 races	Points
1	(Japan) Yūto Totsuka	200
2	(Germany) André Höflich	110
3	(Japan) Raibu Katayama	106
4	(Australia) Scotty James	80
5	(Switzerland) David Hablützel	72

=== Slopestyle ===
Rank	after all 3 races	Points
1	(Norway) Marcus Kleveland	260
2	(Canada) Liam Brearley	116
3	(Germany) Leon Vockensperger	109
4	(Sweden) Niklas Mattsson	103
5	(United States) Dusty Henricksen	90

=== Big Air ===
Rank	after all 1 race	Points
1	(Canada) Maxence Parrot	100
2	(Sweden) Sven Thorgren	80
3	(Norway) Mons Røisland	60
4	(Japan) Takeru Otsuka	50
5	(Finland) Rene Rinnekangas	45

== Ladies' standings ==
=== Parallel overall (PSL/PGS) ===
Rank	after all 9 races	Points
1	(Germany) Ramona Theresia Hofmeister	593
2	(Russia) Sofia Nadyrshina	532
3	(Switzerland) Julie Zogg	512
4	(Germany) Selina Jörg	425
5	(Germany) Cheyenne Loch	413

=== Parallel slalom ===
Rank	after all 4 races	Points
1	(Switzerland) Julie Zogg	295
2	(Russia) Sofia Nadyrshina	249
3	(Germany) Selina Jörg	195
4	(Germany) Cheyenne Loch	188
5	(Austria) Daniela Ulbing	172

=== Parallel giant slalom ===
Rank	after all 5 races	Points
1	(Germany) Ramona Theresia Hofmeister	440
2	(Russia) Sofia Nadyrshina	283
3	(Germany) Selina Jörg	230
4	(Germany) Cheyenne Loch	225
5	(Switzerland) Julie Zogg	217

=== Snowboard Cross ===
Rank	after all 6 races	Points
1	(Czech Republic) Eva Samková	450
2	(Italy) Michela Moioli	430
3	(United States) Faye Gulini	302
4	(France) Julia Pereira de Sousa Mabileau	301
5	(United Kingdom) Charlotte Bankes	285

=== Freestyle overall (BA/SS/HP) ===
Rank	after all 6 races	Points
1	(Austria) Anna Gasser	255
2	(Japan) Kokomo Murase	246
3	(United States) Chloe Kim	200
4	(Japan) Reira Iwabuchi	190
5	(New Zealand) Zoi Sadowski-Synnott	180

=== Halfpipe ===
Rank	after all 2 races	Points
1	(United States) Chloe Kim	200
2	(Japan) Mitsuki Ono	130
3	(Spain) Queralt Castellet	120
4	(Japan) Sena Tomita	120
5	(Japan) Haruna Matsumoto	86

=== Slopestyle ===
Rank	after all 3 races	Points
1	(Austria) Anna Gasser	195
2	(Japan) Kokomo Murase	166
3	(Australia) Tess Coady	165
4	(United States) Jamie Anderson	140
4	(Japan) Reira Iwabuchi	140

=== Big Air ===
Rank	after all 1 race	Points
1	(New Zealand) Zoi Sadowski-Synnott	100
2	(Japan) Kokomo Murase	80
3	(Austria) Anna Gasser	60
4	(Japan) Reira Iwabuchi	50
5	(Japan) Miyabi Onitsuka	45

== Team ==
=== Parallel Team ===
Rank	after all 2 races	Points
1	Russia I	160
2	Austria I	150
3	Switzerland I	125
4	Austria II	95
5	Germany I	80

== Nations Cup ==
=== Overall ===
Rank	after all 44 races	Points
1	Austria	2882
2	Italy	2433
3	Germany	2311
4	Switzerland	2291
5	United States	2210

== Podium table by nation ==
Table showing the World Cup podium places (gold–1st place, silver–2nd place, bronze–3rd place) by the countries represented by the athletes.

Rank	Nation	Gold	Silver	Bronze	Total
1	Russia	7	6	2	15
2	Austria	7	3	6	16
3	Italy	6	2	4	12
4	Czech Republic	4	0	1	5
5	Germany	3	8	7	18
6	United States	3	6	5	14
7	Japan	3	4	4	11
8	Switzerland	2	3	2	7
9	Canada	2	2	1	5
10	Norway	2	0	2	4
11	Slovenia	1	1	2	4
12	New Zealand	1	1	0	2
12	Sweden	1	1	0	2
14	Great Britain	1	0	1	2
15	Netherlands	1	0	0	1
16	France	0	3	3	6
17	Spain	0	2	0	2
18	Australia	0	1	2	3
19	Poland	0	1	1	2
20	Finland	0	0	1	1
Totals (20 entries)		44	44	44	132
