= Snowboarding at the 2022 Winter Olympics – Mixed team snowboard cross =

Mixed team snowboard cross at the XXIV Olympic Winter Games
- Snowboarding
- Venue: Genting Snow Park, Zhangjiakou
- Date: 12 February
- Competitors: 30 from 10 nations
- Teams: 15

Medalists
1st place, gold medalist(s)		Nick Baumgartner; Lindsey Jacobellis	United States
2nd place, silver medalist(s)		Omar Visintin; Michela Moioli	Italy
3rd place, bronze medalist(s)		Éliot Grondin; Meryeta O'Dine	Canada

The mixed team snowboard cross competition in snowboarding at the 2022 Winter Olympics was held on 12 February, at the Genting Snow Park in Zhangjiakou. This was the first time a mixed snowboarding event would be featured at the Olympics. Nick Baumgartner and Lindsey Jacobellis of the United States won the event. Jacobellis added a second gold to the one she won two days earlier in the individual snowboard cross (which was also Team USA's first 2022 Olympic gold), while Baumgartner won his first Olympic medal. Omar Visintin and Michela Moioli of Italy won the silver medal, and Éliot Grondin and Meryeta O'Dine of Canada bronze.

At the 2021–22 FIS Snowboard World Cup, only one mixed team snowboard cross event was held before the Olympics. Italy won, ahead of the Czech Republic and France. However, Eva Samková from the Czech team was injured during the event and had to miss the Olympics. Australia are the 2021 World Champions, with Italy and France being the silver and bronze medalists, respectively.

United States-1, Canada-1, Italy-1, and Italy-2 made it to the big finals. In the women's run, O'Dine and Caterina Carpano, who were on positions 3 and 4, fell, leaving Moioli and Jacobellis to decide on gold and silver. Moioli was initially leading, but Jacobellis managed to overtake her taking the gold.

== Qualification ==
A total of 16 teams (32 snowboarders) qualified to compete at the games. A country could enter a maximum of two teams into the event.

== Results ==
=== Quarterfinals ===
Q — Qualified for the semifinals
Heat 1

Rank	Bib	Country	Athletes	Notes
1	1	Italy 1	Omar Visintin; Michela Moioli	Q
2	8	Germany 1	Martin Nörl; Jana Fischer	Q
3	9	France 2	Loan Bozzolo; Julia Pereira de Sousa Mabileau	

Heat 2

Rank	Bib	Country	Athletes	Notes
1	5	United States 1	Nick Baumgartner; Lindsey Jacobellis	Q
2	13	Switzerland 1	Kalle Koblet; Sophie Hediger	Q
-	4	Australia 1	Cameron Bolton; Belle Brockhoff	DNF
-	12	Australia 2	Adam Lambert; Josie Baff	DNF

Heat 3

Rank	Bib	Country	Athletes	Notes
1	14	ROC 1	Daniil Donskikh; Kristina Paul	Q
2	6	Canada 1	Éliot Grondin; Meryeta O'Dine	Q
3	11	United States 2	Jake Vedder; Faye Gulini	
4	3	France 1	Merlin Surget; Chloé Trespeuch	

Heat 4

Rank	Bib	Country	Athletes	Notes
1	15	Great Britain 1	Huw Nightingale; Charlotte Bankes	Q
2	10	Italy 2	Lorenzo Sommariva; Caterina Carpano	Q
3	7	Canada 2	Liam Moffatt; Tess Critchlow	
4	2	Austria 1	Alessandro Hämmerle; Pia Zerkhold	

=== Semifinals ===
Q — Qualified for the finals
Heat 1

Rank	Bib	Country	Athletes	Notes
1	1	Italy 1	Omar Visintin; Michela Moioli	Q
2	5	United States 1	Nick Baumgartner; Lindsey Jacobellis	Q
3	8	Germany 1	Martin Nörl; Jana Fischer	
4	13	Switzerland 1	Kalle Koblet; Sophie Hediger	

Heat 2

Rank	Bib	Country	Athletes	Notes
1	10	Italy 2	Lorenzo Sommariva; Caterina Carpano	Q
2	6	Canada 1	Éliot Grondin; Meryeta O'Dine	Q
3	15	Great Britain 1	Huw Nightingale; Charlotte Bankes	
4	14	ROC 1	Daniil Donskikh; Kristina Paul	

=== Finals ===
==== Small final ====
Rank	Bib	Country	Athletes	Notes
5	8	Germany 1	Martin Nörl; Jana Fischer	
6	15	Great Britain 1	Huw Nightingale; Charlotte Bankes	
7	13	Switzerland 1	Kalle Koblet; Sophie Hediger	
8	14	ROC 1	Daniil Donskikh; Kristina Paul	

==== Big final ====
Rank	Bib	Country	Athletes	Notes
1st place, gold medalist(s)	5	United States 1	Nick Baumgartner; Lindsey Jacobellis	
2nd place, silver medalist(s)	1	Italy 1	Omar Visintin; Michela Moioli	
3rd place, bronze medalist(s)	6	Canada 1	Éliot Grondin; Meryeta O'Dine	
4	10	Italy 2	Lorenzo Sommariva; Caterina Carpano	
