= Jakob Dusek =

Austrian snowboarder (born 1996)

Personal information
- Born: 19 November 1996 (age 29) St. Pölten, Austria

Sport
- Country: Austria
- Sport: Snowboarding
- Event: Snowboard cross
Medal record
Men's snowboarding
Representing Austria
Olympic Games
| Bronze medal – third place | 2026 Milano Cortina | Snowboard cross |
World Championships
| Gold medal – first place | 2023 Bakuriani | Snowboard cross |

Jakob Dusek (born 19 November 1996) is an Austrian snowboarder specializing in snowboard cross. He represented Austria at the 2022 and 2026 Winter Olympics, winning bronze in the latter.

== Career ==
Dusek made his FIS Snowboard World Championships debut for Austria at the 2021 Snowboarding World Championships and finished in fourth place in the snowboard cross event. During the 2021–22 FIS Snowboard World Cup, he earned his first World Cup win on 18 December 2021.

He then represented Austria at the 2022 Winter Olympics in the snowboard cross event. He had the third fastest time during seeding with a time of 1:17.05, however, he was eliminated during the elimination round. He then competed at the 2023 Snowboarding World Championships and won a gold medal in the snowboard cross event.

During the 2024–25 FIS Snowboard World Cup he opened the season with a win on 14 December 2024. He finished the World Cup tied with Éliot Grondin for the most wins with three each, and finished in third place in the overall standings with 444 points. He again competed at the 2025 Snowboarding World Championships and finished in fourth place in the snowboard cross event.

== Snowboard cross results ==
All results are sourced from the International Ski Federation (FIS).

=== Olympic Games ===
- 1 medal – (1 bronze)

| Year | Age | Individual | Mixed Team |
|---|---|---|---|
| 2022 | 25 | — | — |
| 2026 | 29 | Bronze | TBD |
