= Godino =

Godino is a surname found in Spanish and Italian. Notable people with this name include:

- Cayetano Santos Godino (1896–1944), Argentinian serial killer
- Javier Godino (born 1978), Spanish actor
- Joe Godino, drummer for The Menzingers
- Michele Godino (born 1992), Italian snowboarder
