= Snowboarding at the 2022 Winter Olympics =

Snowboarding at the XXIV Olympic Winter Games
- Snowboarding pictograms
- Venue: Genting Snow Park; Big Air Shougang
- Dates: 5–15 February 2022
- No. of events: 11 (5 men, 5 women, 1 mixed)
- Competitors: 238

Snowboarding at the 2022 Winter Olympics were held at the Genting Snow Park in Zhangjiakou and Big Air Shougang in Beijing, China. The events took place between 5 and 15 February 2022. A total of 11 snowboarding events were held.

In July 2018, the International Olympic Committee (IOC) officially added the mixed team snowboard cross event to the Olympic program, increasing the total number of events to 11.

A total of 238 quota spots were distributed to the sport of snowboarding, a decline of 20 from the 2018 Winter Olympics. A total of 11 events were contested, five for men, five for women and one mixed.

== Qualification ==
A total of 238 athletes qualified to compete in the snowboarding events (119 men and 119 women). A country can enter a maximum of 26 athletes across all events, with a maximum of 14 per gender. A total of eight quotas (one per event) is reserved for the host nation, if it fails to qualify in that respective event. Each event also has a minimum FIS points total required per athlete, along with a top 30 finish at a World Cup event during the qualification period (1 July 2019 or 2020 in Parallel giant slalom, to 16 January 2022), or 2021 FIS Snowboarding World Championships. A total of 16 NOC's will qualify for the mixed team snowboard cross event. The athlete quota per event is listed below.

Event	Men	Women	Minimum FIS points
Big air/Slopestyle	30	30	50.00
Halfpipe	25	25	50.00
Parallel giant slalom	32	32	100.00
Snowboard cross	32	32	100.00
238 quotas	119	119	

- Big air and slopestyle have a combined event quota.

== Competition schedule ==
The following is the competition schedule for all eleven events.

Sessions that included the event finals are shown in bold.

All times are (UTC+8).

Date	Time	Event
5 February	10:45	Women's slopestyle
6 February	9:30	**Women's slopestyle**
6 February	12:30	Men's slopestyle
7 February	12:00	**Men's slopestyle**
8 February	10:40	**Women's** and **Men's parallel giant slalom**
9 February	9:30	Women's halfpipe
9 February	12:30	Men's halfpipe
9 February	14:30	**Women's snowboard cross**
10 February	9:00	**Women's halfpipe**
10 February	11:15	**Men's snowboard cross**
11 February	9:30	**Men's halfpipe**
12 February	10:00	**Mixed team snowboard cross**
14 February	9:30	Women's big air
14 February	13:30	Men's big air
15 February	9:30	**Women's big air**
15 February	13:00	**Men's big air**

== Medal summary ==
Austria and the United States won the most gold medals at these Games, with three apiece, while Canada led the overall standings with six medals.

=== Medal table ===
* Host nation (China)

Rank	Nation	Gold	Silver	Bronze	Total
1	Austria	3	1	0	4
1	United States	3	1	0	4
3	Canada	1	1	4	6
4	China*	1	1	0	2
4	New Zealand	1	1	0	2
6	Japan	1	0	2	3
7	Czech Republic	1	0	0	1
8	Australia	0	1	1	2
8	Italy	0	1	1	2
8	Slovenia	0	1	1	2
11	France	0	1	0	1
11	Norway	0	1	0	1
11	Spain	0	1	0	1
14	ROC	0	0	1	1
14	Switzerland	0	0	1	1
Totals (15 entries)		**11**	**11**	**11**	**33**

=== Medalists ===
==== Men's events ====
Event	Gold		Silver		Bronze	
Big air	Su Yiming; China	182.50	Mons Røisland; Norway	171.75	Max Parrot; Canada	170.25
Halfpipe	Ayumu Hirano; Japan	96.00	Scotty James; Australia	92.50	Jan Scherrer; Switzerland	87.25
Slopestyle	Max Parrot; Canada	90.96	Su Yiming; China	88.70	Mark McMorris; Canada	88.53
Parallel giant slalom	Benjamin Karl; Austria		Tim Mastnak; Slovenia		Vic Wild; ROC	
Snowboard cross	Alessandro Hämmerle; Austria		Éliot Grondin; Canada		Omar Visintin; Italy	

==== Women's events ====
Event	Gold		Silver		Bronze	
Big air	Anna Gasser; Austria	185.50	Zoi Sadowski-Synnott; New Zealand	177.00	Kokomo Murase; Japan	171.50
Halfpipe	Chloe Kim; United States	94.00	Queralt Castellet; Spain	90.25	Sena Tomita; Japan	88.25
Slopestyle	Zoi Sadowski-Synnott; New Zealand	92.88	Julia Marino; United States	87.68	Tess Coady; Australia	84.15
Parallel giant slalom	Ester Ledecká; Czech Republic		Daniela Ulbing; Austria		Gloria Kotnik; Slovenia	
Snowboard cross	Lindsey Jacobellis; United States		Chloé Trespeuch; France		Meryeta O'Dine; Canada	

==== Mixed ====
Event	Gold	Silver	Bronze
Team snowboard cross	United States; Nick Baumgartner; Lindsey Jacobellis	Italy; Omar Visintin; Michela Moioli	Canada; Éliot Grondin; Meryeta O'Dine

== Participating nations ==
A total of 233 athletes (119 men and 114 women) from 31 nations (including the IOC's designation of ROC for the Russian Olympic Committee) qualified to participate. Hungary and Malta made their Olympic snowboarding debuts.

The numbers in parentheses represents the number of participants entered.

- Andorra (1)
- Australia (11)
- Austria (13)
- Belgium (1)
- Bulgaria (1)
- Canada (23)
- China (14)
- Croatia (1)
- Czech Republic (5)
- Finland (4)
- France (9)
- Germany (15)
- Great Britain (3)
- Hungary (1)
- Ireland (1)
- Italy (17)
- Japan (19)
- Malta (1)
- Netherlands (4)
- New Zealand (3)
- Norway (4)
- Poland (5)
- ROC (15)
- Slovakia (1)
- Slovenia (6)
- South Korea (5)
- Spain (2)
- Sweden (2)
- Switzerland (19)
- Ukraine (1)
- United States (26)
