= Koblet (surname) =

Koblet may refer to:

- Hugo Koblet (1925–1964), Swiss champion cyclist
- Kalle Koblet (born 1997), Swiss snowboarder
- Karl Koblet (1891/92-1954), Swiss footballer
- Rudolf Koblet (1904–1983), Swiss plant scientist
