= Anton Lindfors =

Finnish snowboarder (born 1991)

Personal information
- Born: 22 April 1991 Porvoo, Finland

Sport
- Sport: Skiing

World Cup career
- Indiv. podiums: 1

Anton Lindfors (born 22 April 1991 in Porvoo) is a Finnish snowboarder, specializing in snowboard cross.

Lindfors competed at the 2014 Winter Olympics for Finland. In the snowboard cross, he finished 2nd in his 1/8 round race, advancing to the quarter-finals, where he placed 4th, not advancing, and ending up 13th overall.

As of September 2014, his best showing at the World Championships is 10th, in the 2013 snowboard cross.

Lindfors made his World Cup debut in September 2009. As of September 2014, he has one World Cup podium finish, winning a silver medal at Veysonnaz in 2013–14. His best overall finish is 7th, in 2013–14.

== World Cup podiums ==
Date	Location	Rank	Event
11 March 2014	Veysonnaz	2nd place, silver medalist(s)	Snowboard cross
