= Éliot Grondin =

Canadian snowboarder (born 2001)

Personal information
- Born: 19 April 2001 (age 25) Sainte-Marie, Quebec, Canada
- Height: 1.83 m (6 ft 0 in)
- Weight: 81 kg (179 lb)\

Sport
- Country: Canada
- Sport: Snowboarding
- Event: Snowboard cross
Medal record
Men's snowboarding
Representing Canada
Olympic Games
Silver medal – second place	2022 Beijing	Snowboard cross
Silver medal – second place	2026 Milano Cortina	Snowboard cross
Bronze medal – third place	2022 Beijing	Mixed team snowboard cross
World Championships
Gold medal – first place	2025 Engadin	Snowboard cross
Bronze medal – third place	2021 Idre	Snowboard cross
World Junior Championships
Gold medal – first place	2021 Krasnoyarsk	Snowboard cross
Silver medal – second place	2019 Reiteralm	Snowboard cross
Silver medal – second place	2018 Cardrona	Snowboard cross

Éliot Grondin (born 19 April 2001) is a Canadian snowboarder competing in snowboard cross.

== Career ==
=== World Championships ===
Grondin has won three medals at the FIS Snowboarding Junior World Championships, with a silver in 2018 and 2019, while winning gold in 2021. With his gold medal win, he became the first Canadian in history to win the title.

At the FIS Freestyle Ski and Snowboarding World Championships 2021, Grondin won bronze in the snowboard cross event.

=== Winter Olympics ===
In 2018, Grondin competed at his first Olympics at the age of 16, becoming the youngest male athlete on Team Canada. Grondin finished in 36th place in the snowboard cross event at the games.

In January 2022, Grondin was named to Canada's 2022 Olympic team. Grondin would go onto win the silver medal in the snowboard cross event. Grondin would later win the bronze medal in the inaugural mixed team snowboard cross event with compatriot Meryeta O'Dine.

In February 2026, Grondin won silver in the snowboard cross at the Milan Cortina games.

== Snowboard cross results ==
All results are sourced from the International Ski Federation (FIS).

=== Olympic Games ===
- 3 medals – (2 silver, 1 bronze)

Year	Age	Individual	Mixed Team
2018	16	36	—
2022	20	Silver	Bronze
2026	24	Silver	13

=== World championships ===
- 2 medals – (1 gold, 1 bronze)

Year	Age	Individual	Team
2019	17	27	10
2021	19	Bronze	13
2023	21	9	5
2025	23	Gold	13

=== World Cup standings ===
Season	Age	Snowboard Cross
2018	16	37
2019	17	25
2020	18	7
2021	19	2nd place, silver medalist(s)
2022	20	4
2023	21	3rd place, bronze medalist(s)
2024	22	1st place, gold medalist(s)
2025	23	1st place, gold medalist(s)
