= Hanna Ihedioha =

German snowboarder (born 1997)

Personal information
- Nationality: German
- Born: 9 July 1997 (age 28) Dingolfing

Sport
- Country: Germany
- Sport: Snowboarding
- Event: Snowboard cross
- Club: SC Dingolfing
Medal record
Women's snowboarding
Representing Germany
World Championships
Bronze medal – third place	2019 Utah	Mixed team snowboard cross

Hanna Ihedioha (born 9 July 1997 in Dingolfing) is a German snowboarder.

She participated at the FIS Freestyle Ski and Snowboarding World Championships 2019, winning a medal.
