= Julian Lüftner =

Austrian snowboarder (born 1993)

Personal information
- Born: 11 January 1993 (age 33) Zams, Austria

Sport
- Country: Austria
- Sport: Snowboarding
- Event: Snowboard cross

Julian Lüftner (born 11 January 1993) is an Austrian snowboarder who competed at the 2022 Winter Olympics.

== Career ==
He represented Austria at the 2022 Winter Olympics in the snowboard cross event.
