= Aidan Chollet =

French snowboarder (born 2004)

Personal information
- Born: 2 December 2004 (age 21) Gap, Hautes-Alpes, France

Sport
- Country: France
- Sport: Snowboarding
- Event: Snowboard cross
Medal record
Men's snowboarding
Representing France
Junior World Championships
Silver medal – second place	2023 Passo San Pellegrino	Snowboard cross
Silver medal – second place	2024 Gudauri	Mixed team snowboard cross
Bronze medal – third place	2024 Gudauri	Snowboard cross
Bronze medal – third place	2023 Passo San Pellegrino	Mixed team snowboard cross

Aidan Chollet (born 2 December 2004) is a French snowboarder specializing in snowboard cross.

== Career ==
During the 2024 FIS Snowboarding Junior World Championships he won a silver medal in the mixed team snowboard cross and a bronze medal in the snowboard cross.

During the 2024–25 FIS Snowboard World Cup, Chollet earned his first career World Cup victory on 15 February 2025. On 21 March 2025, he earned his second World Cup podium of the season, finishing in third place. The next day he won his first mixed team race of the season.

In January 2026, he was selected to represent France at the 2026 Winter Olympics. He competed in the snowboard cross event and finished in fourth place.

== Personal life ==
His younger brother, Jonas, is also a snowboarder.
