= Jérôme Lymann =

Swiss snowboarder (born 1996)

Personal information
- Nationality: Swiss
- Born: 2 April 1996 (age 29)
- Height: 1.80 m (5 ft 11 in)

Sport
- Sport: Snowboarding

Jérôme Lymann (born 2 April 1996) is a Swiss snowboarder. He competed in the 2018 Winter Olympics.
