= Glenn de Blois =

Dutch snowboarder (born 1995)

Personal information
- Nationality: Dutch
- Born: 5 September 1995 (age 30) Delft, Netherlands
- Height: 1.83 m (6 ft 0 in)
- Weight: 84 kg (185 lb)

Sport
- Country: Netherlands
- Sport: Snowboarding
- Event: Snowboard cross

Glenn de Blois (born 5 September 1995) is a Dutch snowboarder who competes in snowboard cross. He has qualified for the 2022 Winter Olympics in Beijing.

== Career ==
De Blois was born in Delft but grew up in nearby De Lier. He was exposed to skiing from the age of three during winter vacations and began snowboarding at eight. He also did indoor roller skating. When he was 14, he decided to focus on the snowboard cross discipline for competition.

De Blois made his major competitive debut at a European Cup event in Cortina d'Ampezzo on 18 December 2012, finishing 89th in the snowboard cross competition. He also won his first Dutch national title in 2012 and trained with the British national team in the 2015–16 season.

=== 2015–2016 ===
De Blois competed in the snowboard cross competition at the 2015 Winter Universiade in Spain, as well as the 2015 and 2016 editions of the FIS Snowboarding Junior World Championships.

He made his World Cup debut in January 2016 in Feldberg, where he finished 19th. He earned his top ten finish a few weeks later, finishing sixth at just his third World Cup event in Veysonnaz in March. The following month, he won the Dutch national snowboard cross championship. He was named the Westland Sportsman of the Year at the 2016 Westland Sports Awards for his achievements.

=== 2016–2017 ===
De Blois was invited to train with the German national team ahead of the 2016–2017 season due to his performances. On 29 January 2017 he won gold at a European Cup event in Germany, then took silver at a European Cup race in Italy the next month. At the 2017 World Championships in Spain, he finished 37th in the snowboard cross and eighth in the snowboard team cross alongside Karel Van Goor. Four days later, he won bronze at yet another European Cup race in Switzerland.

=== 2018–2019 ===
De Blois finished 33rd in the snowboard cross competition at the 2019 World Championships in Canada, missing qualification to the finals by .09 seconds. In the run-up to the competition, he had finished in first and second place in races at the North American Cup.

=== 2019–2020 ===
De Blois only had one top-ten World Cup finish in the 2019–20 season, an eighth-place performance in Cervinia on 21 December 2019.

=== 2020–2021 ===
He won his first World Cup race in Chiesa on 23 January 2021 – the first event of the 2020–21 season. Not only did he become the first Dutch competitor to win a World Cup competition in snowboard cross, but he also secured his qualification to the 2022 Winter Olympics held in Beijing. He placed fourth overall in the 2020–21 World Cup season. He also finished tenth in the snowboard cross race at the 2021 World Championships in Sweden.

De Blois was again nominated for Westland Sportsman of the Year in January 2022.

== Personal life ==
De Blois has spent his winters in Austria since the age of 17 and does wakeboarding and surfing back home in the summer. He worked many jobs to finance his career in his early years, such as baking pizzas at a restaurant and giving surfing lessons in Ter Heijde.

== Results ==
Olympic Winter Games
2022 – Genting, TBA at snowboardcross
FIS World Snowboard Championships
2017 – Sierra Nevada, 37th at snowboardcross
2017 – Sierra Nevada, 8th at snowboardcross team
2019 – Solitude, 33rd at snowboardcross
2021 – Idre, 10th at snowboardcross
World Cup
2021 – Chiesa, (gold) 1st at snowboardcross
European Cup
2017 – Grasgehren, (gold) 1st at snowboardcross
2017 – Colere, (silver) 2nd at snowboardcross
2017 – Dolní Morava, (bronze) 3rd at snowboardcross
North American Cup
2019 – Panorama, (gold) 1st at snowboardcross
2019 – Panorama, (silver) 2nd at snowboardcross
FIS Races
2014 – Isola 2000, (gold) 1st at snowboardcross
2016 – Dolní Morava, (gold) 1st at snowboardcross
2016 – Dolní Morava, (gold) 1st at snowboardcross
2016 – Boží Dar, (gold) 1st at snowboardcross
2016 – Boží Dar, (silver) 2nd at snowboardcross
2019 – Pyhätunturi, (bronze) 3rd at snowboardcross
2020 – Flumserberg, (gold) 1st at snowboardcross
2021 – Crans-Montana, (gold) 1st at snowboardcross

=== World Cup seasonal results ===
Season	Points	Finish
2015–16	539.4	34th
2016–17	100.1	61st
2017–18	1630.5	21st
2018–19	680	26th
2019–20	618.8	24th
2020–21	247	4th
