= FIS Freestyle Ski and Snowboarding World Championships 2019 – Mixed snowboard team cross =

Mixed snowboard team cross at the FIS Freestyle Ski and Snowboarding World Championships 2019
- Venue: Solitude Mountain Resort
- Location: Utah, United States
- Dates: February 3
- Competitors: 32 from 8 nations
- Teams: 16

Medalists
gold medal	Mick Dierdorff; Lindsey Jacobellis	United States
silver medal	Omar Visintin; Michela Moioli	Italy
bronze medal	Paul Berg; Hanna Ihedioha	Germany

The Mixed snowboard team cross competition at the FIS Freestyle Ski and Snowboarding World Championships 2019 was held on February 3, 2019.

== Elimination round ==
Four-team elimination races were held, with the top two from each race advancing.

=== Quarterfinals ===
Heat 1

Rank	Bib	Country	Notes
1	8	Germany 1	Q
2	1	Italy 1	Q
3	9	Canada 1	
4	16	Czech Republic 2	

Heat 3

Rank	Bib	Country	Notes
1	3	United States 1	Q
2	6	France 2	Q
3	11	Italy 3	
4	14	Russia 1	

Heat 2

Rank	Bib	Country	Notes
1	12	Canada 2	Q
2	13	Switzerland 1	Q
3	4	United States 2	
4	5	Czech Republic 1	

Heat 4

Rank	Bib	Country	Notes
1	7	Italy 2	Q
2	2	France 1	Q
3	10	Germany 2	
4	15	Switzerland 2	

=== Semifinals ===
Heat 1

Rank	Bib	Country	Notes
1	1	Italy 1	Q
2	8	Germany 1	Q
3	13	Switzerland 1	
4	12	Canada 2	

Heat 2

Rank	Bib	Country	Notes
1	3	United States 1	Q
2	7	Italy 2	Q
3	6	France 2	
4	2	France 1	

=== Finals ===
==== Small final ====
Rank	Bib	Country	Notes
5	2	France 1	
6	12	Canada 2	
7	6	France 2	
8	13	Switzerland 1	

==== Big final ====
Rank	Bib	Country	Notes
1st place, gold medalist(s)	3	United States 1	
2nd place, silver medalist(s)	1	Italy 1	
3rd place, bronze medalist(s)	8	Germany 1	
4	7	Italy 2	
