= Loan Bozzolo =

French snowboarder (born 1999)

Personal information
- Nationality: French
- Born: 4 May 1999 (age 27) Sallanches, France
- Height: 1.77 m (5 ft 10 in)

Sport
- Sport: Snowboarding
Medal record
Men's snowboarding
Representing France
Olympic Games
Bronze medal – third place	2026 Milano Cortina	Mixed team snowboard cross
World Championships
Gold medal – first place	2025 Engadin	Mixed snowboard team cross
Silver medal – second place	2025 Engadin	Snowboard cross

Loan Bozzolo (born 4 May 1999) is a French snowboarder who specializes in snowboard cross. He competed in the 2018, 2022 and 2026 Winter Olympics, winning a bronze medal in the latter, and won two medals at the 2025 Snowboarding World Championships.

== Early life ==
Bozzolo was raised in Saint-Gervais-les-Bains. He began skiing at the age of two and started snowboarding at the age of five.

== Career ==
Bozzolo began competing in snowboard cross as a junior in 2014. His first race was at the European Cup in Pitztal, where he finished 49th overall. His first win as a junior was in Grasgehren in 2016.

In 2018, Bozzolo was selected to compete for France at the 2018 Winter Olympics in the snowboard cross. He qualified from his heat in third place. However, he failed to finish in his Quarterfinal race, putting him out of the competition.

Bozzolo won European Cup races in 2019 in both Lenk and Sunny Valley. At the FIS Snowboard Cross Junior World Championships, Bozzolo won the men's event, beating Éliot Grondin of Canada, and also won the mixed team competition alongside Chloe Passerat.

Bozzolo competed for France at the 2022 Winter Olympics in the snowboard cross. He qualified from his heat in second place. However, he was eliminated in the quarterfinals, finishing third in his race.

In 2025, Bozzolo won a competition on the World Cup tour in Montafon, the second of his career. A week later, he competed at the 2025 Snowboarding World Championships, winning a silver medal in the snowboard cross and a gold medal in the mixed team snowboard cross alongside Julia Pereira de Sousa. At the 2026 Winter Olympics, Bozzolo won the Small Final in the individual event to place fifth overall, before winning the bronze medal in the mixed team event alongside Léa Casta.
