= Daniil Dilman =

Russian snowboarder (born 1996)

Personal information
- Full name: Daniil Olegovich Dilman
- Nationality: Russian
- Born: 26 February 1996 (age 30)
- Height: 1.77 m (5 ft 10 in)

Sport
- Sport: Snowboarding
Medal record
Representing Russia
Winter Universiade
Silver medal – second place	2019 Krasnoyarsk	Cross

Daniil Olegovich Dilman (Russian: Даниил Олегович Дильман; born 26 February 1996) is a Russian snowboarder. He competed in the 2018 Winter Olympics.
