= Lucas Eguibar =

Spanish snowboarder (born 1994)

Personal information
- Full name: Lucas Eguibar Bretón
- Nationality: Spanish
- Born: 9 February 1994 (age 32) San Sebastián, Spain
- Height: 1.82 m (6 ft 0 in)
- Weight: 82 kg (181 lb)

Sport
- Country: Spain
- Sport: Snowboarding
- Event: Snowboard cross
Medal record
Men's snowboarding
Representing Spain
World Championships
Gold medal – first place	2021 Idre	Snowboard cross
Silver medal – second place	2017 Sierra Nevada	Snowboard cross
Silver medal – second place	2017 Sierra Nevada	Team snowboard cross
Junior World Championships
Gold medal – first place	2013 Erzurum	Snowboard cross
Silver medal – second place	2014 Valmalenco	Snowboard cross

Lucas Eguibar Bretón (born 9 February 1994) is a Spanish snowboarder.

== Career ==
At the moment, Lucas Eguibar has 5 world cup victories with 18 total podiums finishes.

He won the Europa Cup in season 2011/2012. In 2013 he won a gold medal at the 2013 FIS Junior World Championships in Erzurum, Turkey.

His first world cup podium was in Arosa, Switzerland on 9 March 2013. He made another podium at the world cup, finishing in 2nd position in Vallnord-Arcalís, Andorra on 12 January 2014. His first World Cup victory was in Veysonnaz, Switzerland on 14 March 2015, becoming the first Spanish snowboarder to win a snowboard world cup event.

He won the 2014–15 FIS Snowboard cross World Cup, becoming the first Spanish snowboarder that win a Cristal Globe. He finished third in the next season.

Lucas competed in his first Olympic Winter Games in 2014. He won all his races except for the semi-final, where he fell and was disqualified for missing a gate. Eguibar won small final and finished 7th in his very first Olympics.

== World Cup podiums ==
=== Individual events ===
Season	Date	Location	Discipline	Place
2013	9 March 2013	Arosa, Switzerland	Snowboard cross	3rd
2014	12 January 2014	Vallnord-Arcalís, Andorra	Snowboard cross	2nd
2015	14 March 2015	Veysonnaz, Switzerland	Snowboard cross	1st
2015	15 March 2015	Veysonnaz, Switzerland	Snowboard cross	2nd
2016	21 February 2016	Sunny Valley, Russia	Snowboard cross	3rd
2016	6 March 2016	Veysonnaz, Switzerland	Snowboard cross	1st
2016	20 March 2016	Baqueira-Beret, Spain	Snowboard cross	3rd
2017	11 February 2017	Feldberg, Germany	Snowboard cross	2nd
2018	13 December 2017	Val Thorens, France	Snowboard cross	3rd
2018	17 March 2018	Veysonnaz, Switzerland	Snowboard cross	3rd
2019	16 March 2019	Veysonnaz, Switzerland	Snowboard cross	1st
2020	7 March 2020	Sierra Nevada, Spain	Snowboard cross	1st
2021	18 February 2021	Reiteralm, Austria	Snowboard cross	2nd
2022	18 December 2021	Cervinia, Italy	Snowboard cross	3rd
2023	11 March 2023	Sierra Nevada, Spain	Snowboard cross	1st
2023	12 March 2023	Sierra Nevada, Spain	Snowboard cross	2nd
2023	25 March 2023	Mt. St. Anne, Canada	Snowboard cross	3rd
2024	3 December 2023	Les Deux Alpes, France	Snowboard cross	3rd

=== Team events ===
Season	Date	Location	Discipline	Place
2017	18 December 2016	Montafon, Austria	Snowboard cross team	1st
2018	17 December 2017	Montafon, Austria	Snowboard cross team	1st
2018	18 March 2018	Veysonnaz, Switzerland	Snowboard cross team	2nd

== Olympic results ==
Season	Date	Location	Discipline	Place
2014	18 February 2014	(Russia) Sochi, Rusia	Snowboard cross	7th
2018	15 February 2018	Pyeongchang, South Korea	Snowboard cross	33rd
2022	10 February 2022	Beijing, China	Snowboard cross	7th

Olympic Games
Preceded by Javier Fernández	Flagbearer for Spain; 2018 Pyeongchang	Succeeded by Incumbent
