= Alessandro Hämmerle =

Swiss-Austrian snowboarder (born 1993)

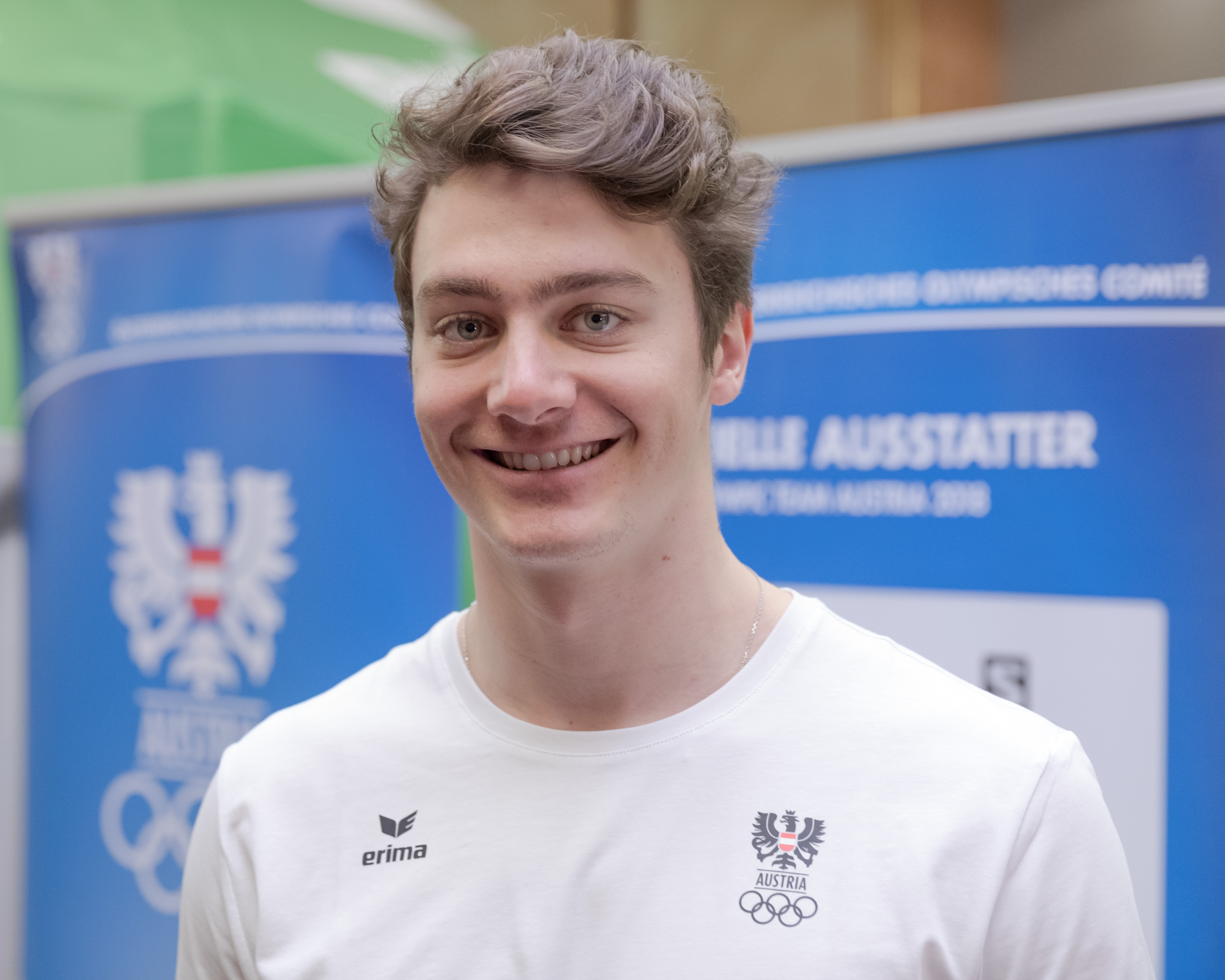
- Hämmerle in 2018

Personal information
- Nationality: Austrian
- Born: 30 July 1993 (age 32) Frauenfeld, Switzerland
- Height: 1.90 m (6 ft 3 in)
- Weight: 82 kg (181 lb)

Sport
- Country: Austria
- Sport: Snowboarding
- Event: Snowboard cross
Medal record
Men's snowboarding
Representing Austria
Olympic Games
Gold medal – first place	2022 Beijing	Snowboard cross
Gold medal – first place	2026 Milano Cortina	Snowboard cross
World Championships
Silver medal – second place	2021 Idre	Snowboard cross
Bronze medal – third place	2025 Engadin	Snowboard cross
Winter Universiade
Silver medal – second place	2015 Granada	Snowboard cross

Alessandro Hämmerle (born 30 July 1993) is a Swiss-born Austrian snowboarder, and Olympic gold medalist in the snowboard cross.

Hämmerle competed at the 2014 Winter Olympics for Austria. In the snowboard cross, he finished 2nd in his 1/8 round race, advancing to the quarter-finals, where he placed 5th, not advancing, and ending up 17th overall.

As of September 2014, his best showing at the World Championships was 6th, in the 2013 snowboard cross.

Hämmerle made his World Cup debut in December 2010. As of September 2014, he had one World Cup victory, coming at Sochi in 2012–13. His best overall finish was 4th in 2012–13.

He has won the gold medal in snowboard cross at the 2022 Beijing and 2026 Milano Cortina Winter Olympics.

== Snowboard cross results ==
All results are sourced from the International Ski Federation (FIS).

=== Olympic Games ===
- 2 medals – (2 gold)

Year	Age	Individual	Mixed Team
2022	28	Gold	—
2026	32	Gold	—

=== World Cup podiums ===
Date	Location	Rank	Event
17 February 2013	Sochi	1st place, gold medalist(s)	Snowboard cross
16 March 2013	Veysonnaz	3rd place, bronze medalist(s)	Snowboard cross

== Personal life ==
Hämmerle was born in Switzerland to an Austrian father and Italian-born mother. He moved to Austria at the age of 8.
