= Jan Kubičík =

Czech snowboarder (born 1996)

Personal information
- Full name: Jan Kubičík
- Nationality: Czech
- Born: 19 January 1996 (age 30) Brno, Czech Republic
- Height: 1.70 m (5 ft 7 in)

Sport
- Sport: Snowboarding

Jan Kubičík (born 19 January 1996) is a Czech snowboarder. He competed in the 2018 Winter Olympics.
