= Liam Moffatt =

Canadian snowboarder (born 1997)

Personal information
- Born: 30 March 1997 (age 28) Truro, Nova Scotia, Canada

Sport
- Country: Canada
- Sport: Snowboarding
- Event: Snowboard cross

Liam Moffatt (born 30 March 1997) is a Canadian snowboarder who competes internationally in the snowboard cross discipline.

== Career ==
At the 2021 World Championships in Sweden, Moffatt finished 7th in the snowboard cross event.

As of December 2021, Moffatt was ranked 17th in the world. In January 2022, Moffatt was named to Canada's 2022 Olympic team in the snowboard cross event.
