= Omar Visintin =

Italian snowboarder (born 1989)

Personal information
- Born: 22 October 1989 (age 36) Merano, Italy
- Height: 1.82 m (6 ft 0 in)
- Weight: 78 kg (172 lb)

Sport
- Country: Italy
- Sport: Snowboarding
- Event: Snowboard cross
- Club: CS Esercito
Medal record
Men's snowboarding
Representing Italy
Olympic Games
Silver medal – second place	2022 Beijing	Mixed team snowboard cross
Bronze medal – third place	2022 Beijing	Snowboard cross
World Championships
Silver medal – second place	2019 Utah	Mixed team snowboard cross
Bronze medal – third place	2023 Bakuriani	Snowboard cross
Winter X Games
Silver medal – second place	2015 Aspen	Snowboard cross

Omar Visintin (born 22 October 1989) is an Italian snowboarder, specializing in snowboard cross, for which he won a silver and a bronze medal for at the Beijing 2022 Olympic Winter Games.

== Career ==
Visintin competed at the 2014 Winter Olympics for Italy. In the snowboard cross, he finished 2nd in his 1/8 round race, then 2nd in his quarterfinal. However, he did not finish his semifinal and did not start the small final, finishing 12th overall.

As of September 2014, his best showing at the World Championships was 22nd, in the 2013 snowboard cross.

Visintin made his World Cup debut in March 2008. As of September 2014, he has two World Cup victories, the first coming at Montafon in 2012–13. Visintin was the 2013–14 World Cup overall winner in snowboard cross.

Visintin competed in the 2022 Winter Olympics in Beijing, where he earned a bronze medal in the men's snowboard cross.

== World Cup podiums ==
Date	Location	Rank	Event
7 December 2012	Montafon	1st place, gold medalist(s)	Snowboard cross
21 March 2013	Sierra Nevada	3rd place, bronze medalist(s)	Snowboard cross
7 December 2013	Montafon	2nd place, silver medalist(s)	Snowboard cross
11 January 2014	Vallnord-Arcalis	3rd place, bronze medalist(s)	Snowboard cross
12 January 2014	Vallnord-Arcalis	1st place, gold medalist(s)	Snowboard cross
