= Paul Berg (snowboarder) =

German snowboarder (born 1991)

Personal information
- Nationality: German
- Born: 26 September 1991 (age 34) Bergisch Gladbach, Germany
- Height: 1.80 m (5 ft 11 in)
- Weight: 79 kg (174 lb)

Sport
- Country: Germany
- Sport: Snowboarding
- Event: Snowboard cross
- Club: SC Konstanz
Medal record
Men's snowboarding
Representing Germany
World Championships
Bronze medal – third place	2019 Utah	Mixed team snowboard cross

Paul Berg (born 26 September 1991) is a German snowboarder, specializing in snowboard cross.

Berg competed at the 2014 Winter Olympics for Germany. In the snowboard cross, he won his 1/8 round race, but finished 4th in his quarterfinal, not advancing, and finishing 13th overall.

Berg made his World Cup debut in January 2012. As of September 2014, he has one World Cup victory, coming at La Molina in 2013–14. His best overall finish was 2nd, in 2013–14.

== World Cup podiums ==
Date	Location	Rank	Event
15 March 2014	La Molina	1st place, gold medalist(s)	Snowboard cross
