= Michele Godino =

Italian snowboarder (born 1992)

Personal information
- Nationality: Italian
- Born: 11 January 1992 (age 34)
- Height: 1.89 m (6 ft 2 in)

Sport
- Sport: Snowboarding

Michele Godino (born 11 January 1992) is an Italian snowboarder. He competed in the 2018 Winter Olympics.
