= Nick Baumgartner =

American snowboarder and off-road racer (born 1981)

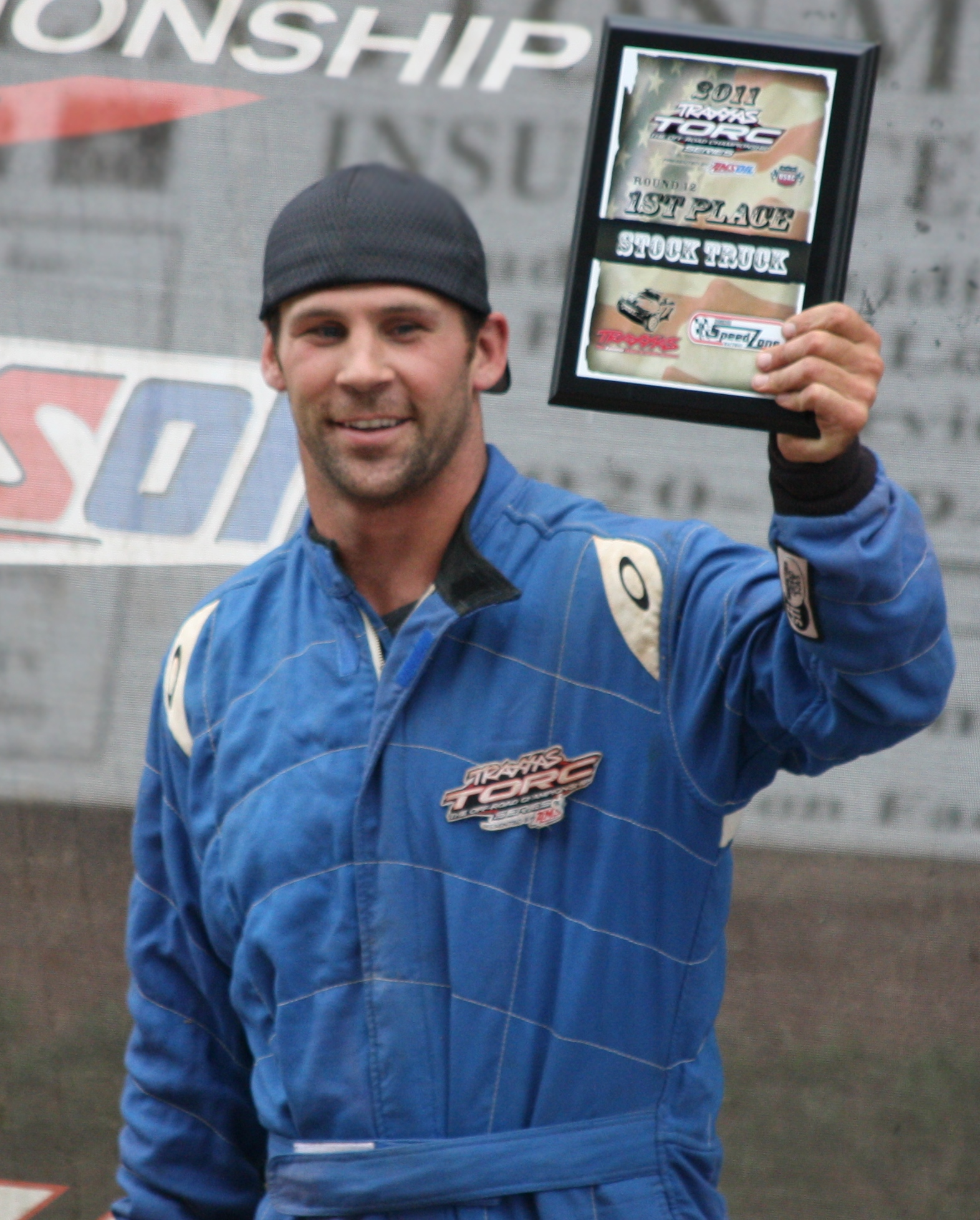
- Baumgartner after winning a Stock Truck division off-road race in 2011

Personal information
- Born: December 17, 1981 (age 44) Iron River, Michigan, U.S.

Sport
- Sport: Snowboard cross, off-road racing
Medal record
Men's snowboarding
Representing the United States
Olympic Games
Gold medal – first place	2022 Beijing	Mixed team snowboard cross
World Championships
Gold medal – first place	2017 Sierra Nevada	Team snowboard cross
Bronze medal – third place	2009 Gangwon	Snowboard cross
Bronze medal – third place	2015 Kreischberg	Snowboard cross
Winter X Games
Gold medal – first place	2011 Aspen	Snowboard cross
Silver medal – second place	2012 Aspen	Snowboard cross

Nick Baumgartner (born December 17, 1981) is an American snowboarder from Iron River, Michigan. He competes in snowboard cross (SBX) and qualified for the 2010 Winter Olympics. He won the gold and silver medals in the 2011 and 2012 Winter X Games. Baumgartner competed in the 2014 Winter Olympics and won his first Olympic gold at the age of 40 in the 2022 Winter Olympics when he and teammate Lindsey Jacobellis won the inaugural Olympic mixed snowboard cross race.

Baumgartner began off-road racing in 2011, winning the Rookie of the Year "Stock Truck" award before advancing to Pro Light trucks in 2012.

== Background ==
Baumgartner attended West Iron County High School where he was an Upper Peninsula of Michigan silver medalist hurdler. He played football at Northern Michigan University.

== Snowboarding ==
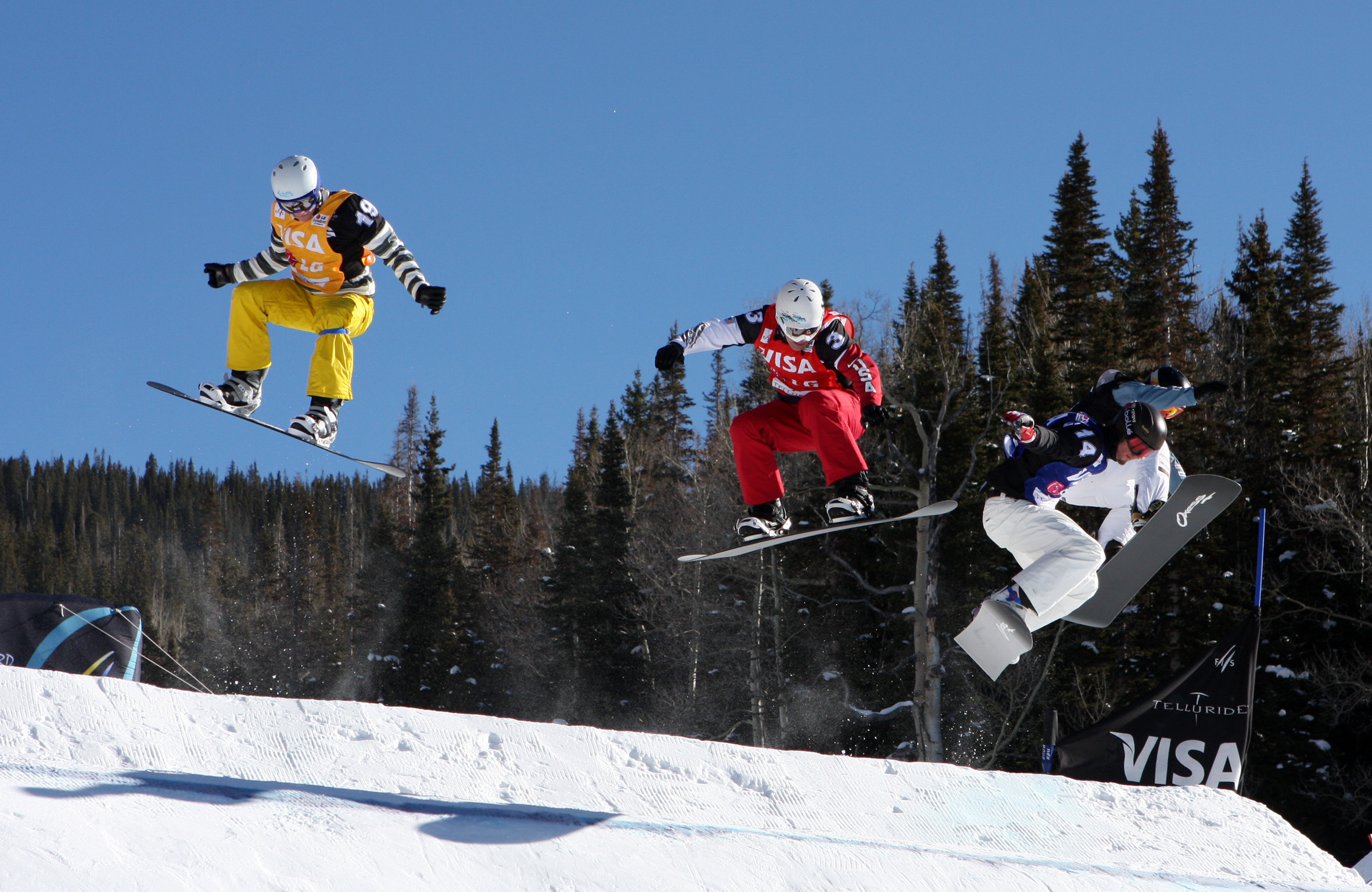
Kevin Hill, Nick Baumgartner (center, in red), Pierre Vaultier at Telluride on December 19, 2009

Baumgartner placed first in multiple competitions in 2004; he had competed at the SNX at the USASA Nationals and first, at the US Extreme Boardfest. While at the US SBX Championships in 2007, he had placed first at the event in Tamarack Resort, Idaho. Then he went to the World Cup finals where Baumgartner had been moved down to take the second place title. Then he had been moved down again while competing at the Copper Mountain Revolution Tour, where he placed third.

Baumgartner's first World Cup victory was in Lake Placid, New York in the snowboard cross event in 2008. He won a bronze medal in the snowboard cross event at the FIS Snowboarding World Championships 2009 in Gangwon. Also in 2009, he earned a bronze medal for the World Champion competition season with five Top 10 finishes and two podium finishes. He won the World Cup in March 2011.

Baumgartner was announced on January 26, 2010, as a member of the United States team for the 2010 Winter Olympics. He competed and did not medal, finishing 20th.

On January 17, 2011, after not being chosen to attend the World Championship competition, Baumgartner went to train at Copper Mountain, where he was in an accident that broke his collar bone. He needed surgery the next day. In 2011 Baumgartner broke Nate Holland's winning streak and his seven-try losing streak. He had done so with fifteen screws and a plate in his neck. After he had won, he grabbed his son Landon and said, "To see the look on his face, to have your boy proud of you, there’s nothing better." On January 30, 2011, Baumgartner won the gold medal at the Winter X Games XV in Aspen, Colorado.

On December 5, 2013, Baumgartner's selection to the 2014 Winter Olympics team was announced. He was placed on the snowboard cross A team for the Olympics in a coach's discretionary spot over Seth Wescott because of his consistency at World Cup events. Baumgartner had a poor start in the first heat race and he finished fourth, just outside the top three who advanced to the quarterfinals.

Baumgartner also competed at the 2018 Winter Olympics in Pyeongchang, South Korea, achieving fourth place in the snowboard cross event.

Baumgartner entered the 2022 Winter Olympics having never won an Olympic medal. He competed in the snowboard cross event but was eliminated in the quarterfinals. Believing he had lost his last shot at a medal, an emotional Baumgartner told NBC, "I'm 40 years old. I'm running out of chances. I have so much support back home, and I feel like I let them down. This one stings. This one hurts." However, later that day, Baumgartner learned that he would be competing with his teammate Lindsey Jacobellis in the inaugural mixed snowboard cross event. After two qualifying rounds, in the final, Baumgartner took the first leg of the race and delivered a slim lead to Jacobellis, who briefly fell back to third before returning to the lead and winning the gold medal for Baumgartner and herself.

== Off-road racing ==
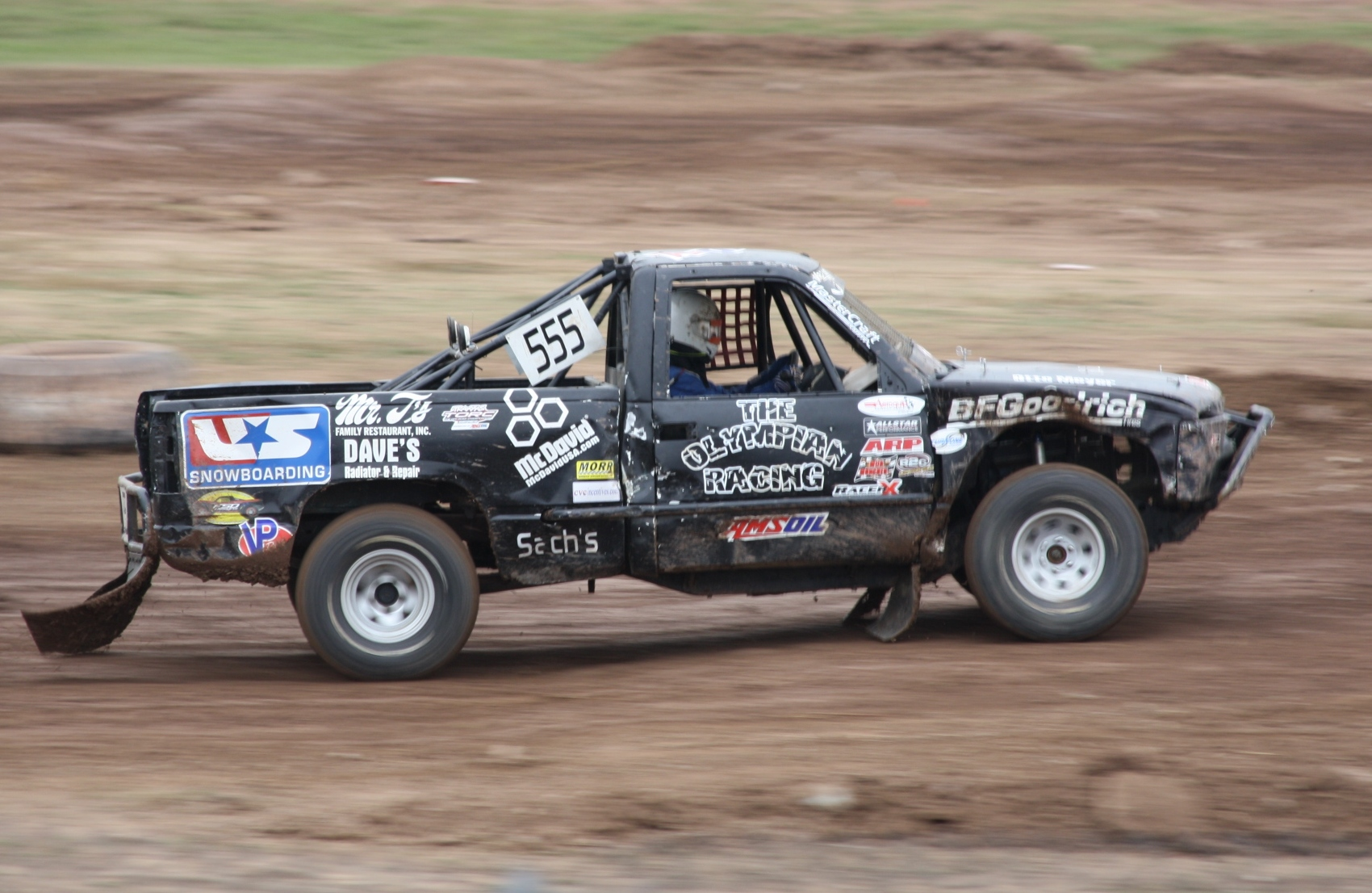
Baumgartner off-road racing in his Stock Truck in 2011

In 2011, Baumgartner began racing in the entry-level "Stock Truck" class in the Traxxas TORC Series. He finished in the top-three in each of his first three races, and he held the points lead at midseason. During the summer of 2011, Baumgartner earned himself the Rookie of the Year while competing in the Traxxas TORC Series Off Road Short Course Racing. He moved up into Pro Light in 2012 and finished sixth in the points standings.

In 2013, Baumgartner joined the Stadium Super Trucks, finishing sixth in the inaugural race at University of Phoenix Stadium. He ran six races that year and finished ninth in points. The following season, he returned to the trucks for X Games Austin 2014; after a fourth-place run in his heat race, he finished eighth in the final.

== Images ==
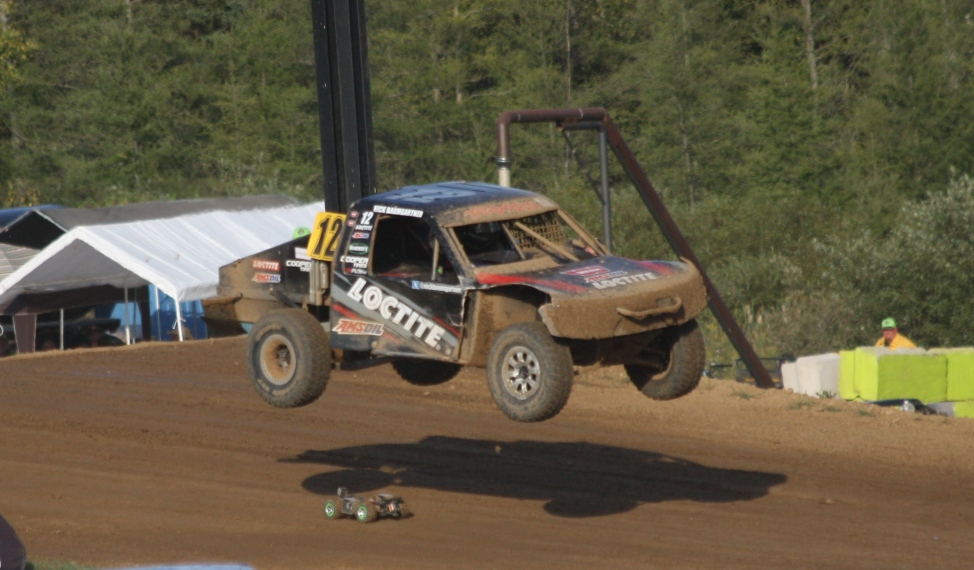
2012 Pro Light

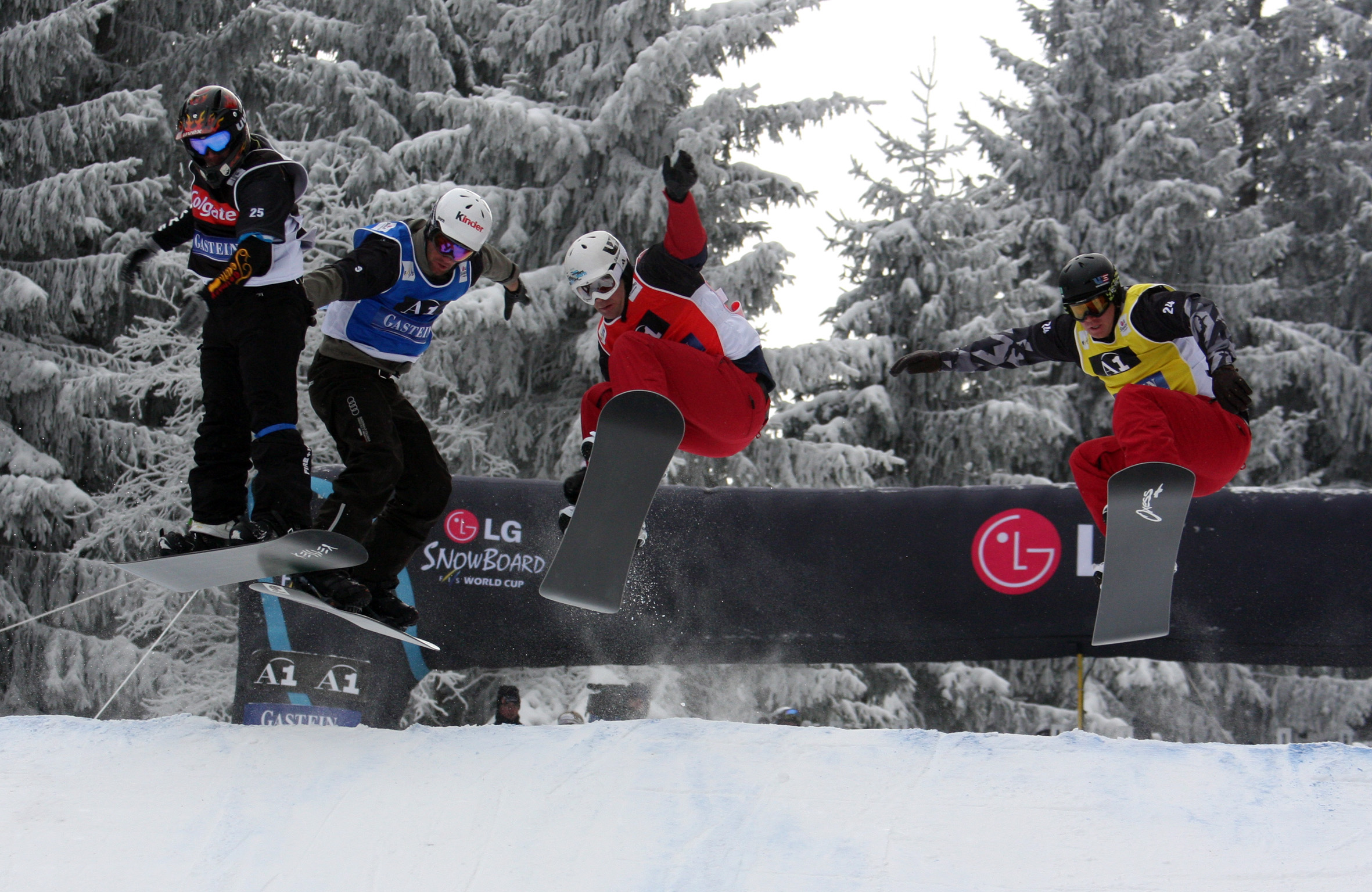
2010 World Cup event

== Motorsports career results ==
=== Stadium Super Trucks ===
(key) (Bold – Pole position. Italics – Fastest qualifier. * – Most laps led.)

Stadium Super Trucks results
Year	1	2	3	4	5	6	7	8	9	10	11	12	13	14	15	16	SSTC	Pts	Ref
2013	PHO; 6	**LBH**; 10	LAN; 4	SDG; 12	SDG; 11	STL; 3	TOR	TOR	CRA	CRA	OCF	OCF	OCF	CPL			9th	120	
2014	STP	STP	LBH	IMS	IMS	DET	DET	DET	AUS; 8	TOR	TOR	OCF	OCF	CSS	LVV	LVV	23rd	20	

== Awards ==
- ANOC Gala Awards 2022：Best Mixed Team Event Performance of Beijing 2022
