= Venues of the 2022 Winter Olympics and Paralympics =

The Beijing Olympic Games Bidding Committee unveiled the venue layout plan for the 2022 Winter Olympics on 20 February 2014; the plan was include the five ice events at the Olympic Green, the Capital Indoor Stadium and the Wukesong Sports Center, which were some of the main venues of the 2008 Summer Olympics. Competitions for luge, bobsleigh and alpine skiing were held at the Xiaohaituo Mountain Area, in a northwest of Beijing (in the West Dazhuangke village, (Note: Originally simply Zhuangke. It is said that the village Dazhuangke was officially renamed Xidazhuangke/West Dazhuangke to avoid confusion with the other Dazhuangke, also in Yanqing District. Zhuangke (庄窠) approximately means peasant dwellings/households in certain dialects of Jin Chinese; Zhuangke (庄科) is a Mandarin corruption of Jin Chinese Zhuangke (庄窠).<) of Zhangshanying in Yanqing District), 90 kilometres (56 miles) away from the city centre of Beijing and 17.5 kilometres (10.9 miles) away from the town of Yanqing. All other skiing events were held in Taizicheng Area in Chongli District, Zhangjiakou, 220 km (140 mi) from downtown Beijing and 130 km (81 mi) away from Xiaohaituo Mountain Area.

== Beijing Cluster ==
=== Olympic Green venues ===
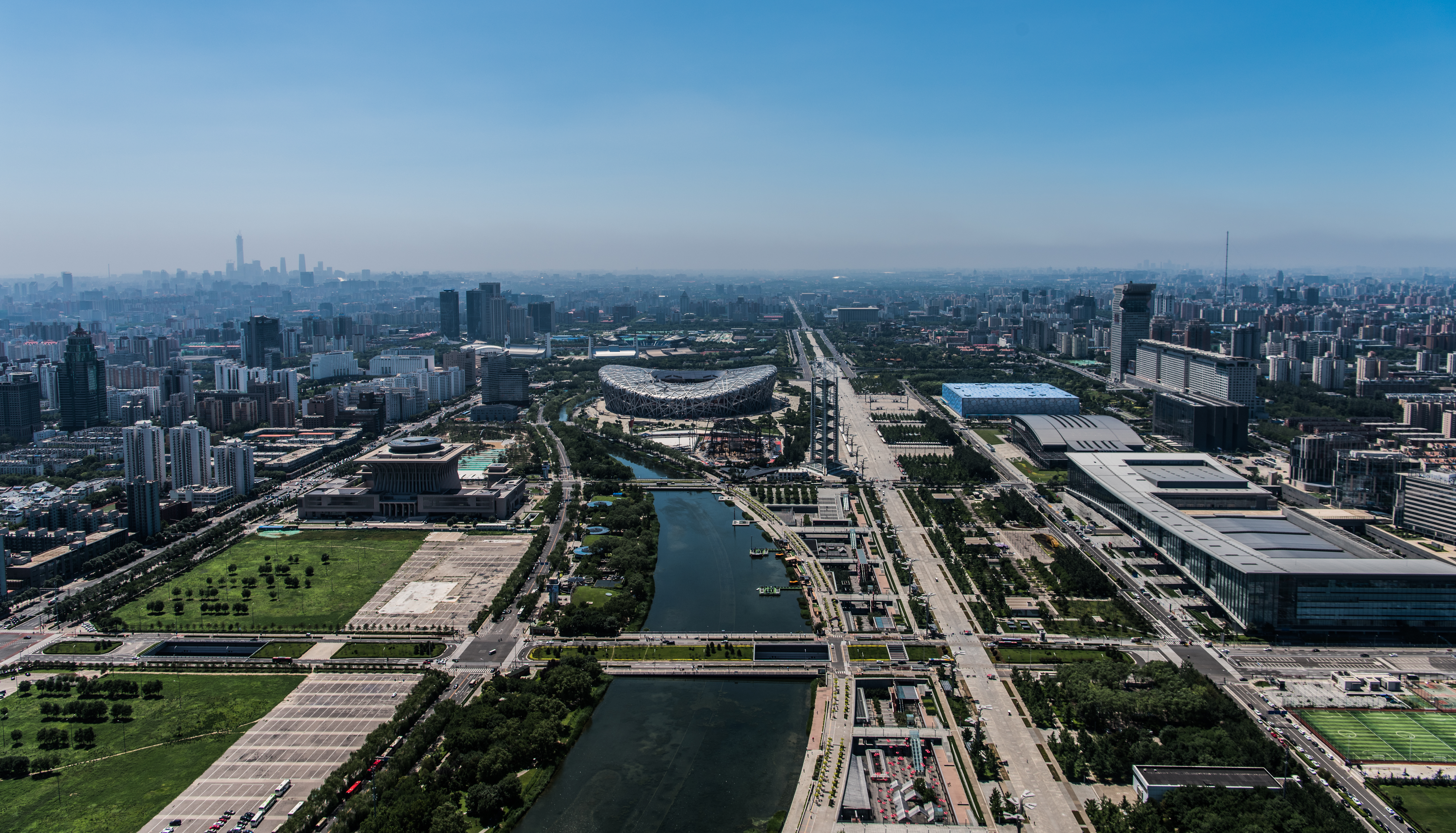
Beijing Olympic Green

- Beijing National Indoor Stadium: Ice hockey
- Beijing National Stadium: Opening, awarding and closing ceremonies
- Beijing National Speed Skating Oval: Speed skating
- Beijing National Aquatics Centre: Curling

Non-competition venues

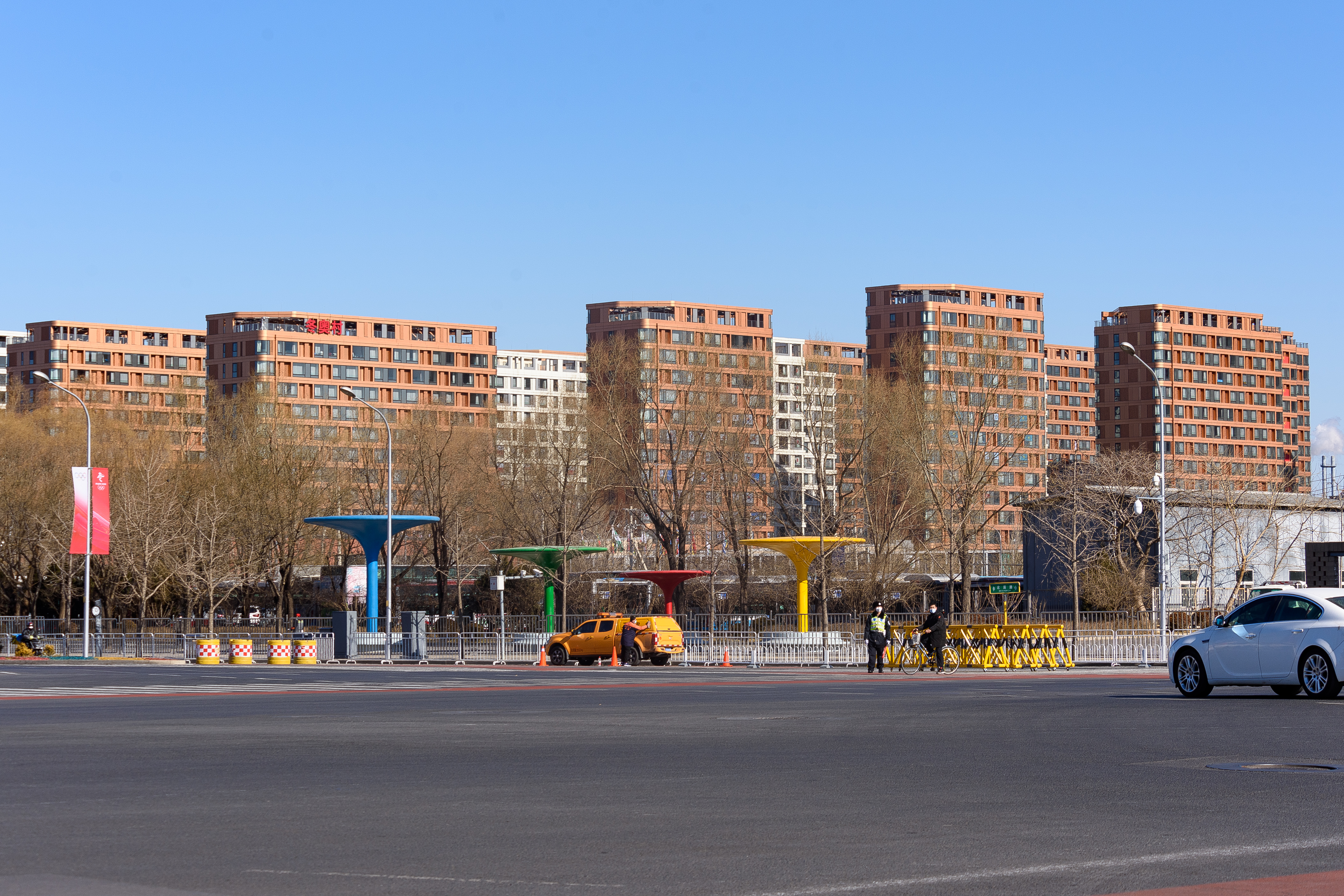
Beijing 2022 Winter Olympic Village

- Beijing 2022 Olympic Village
- China National Convention Center: MPC/IBC

=== Other venues ===
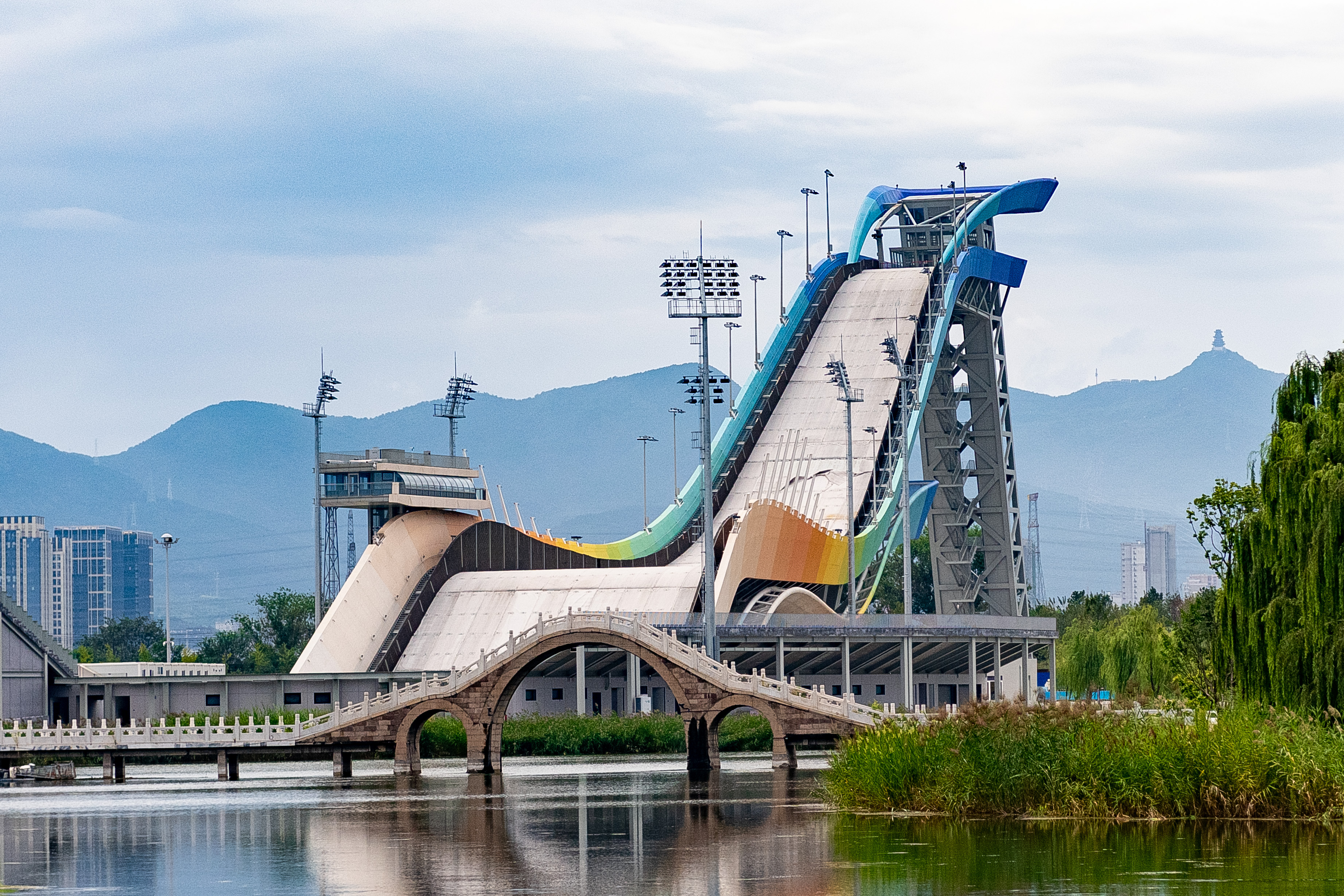
Big Air Shougang.

- Capital Indoor Stadium: Figure skating, Short track speed skating
- Wukesong Sports Centre: Ice hockey
- Big Air Shougang: Big air

== Yanqing Cluster ==
- Yanqing National Alpine Skiing Centre: Alpine skiing
- Yanqing National Sliding Centre: Bobsleigh, Luge, Skeleton
- Yanqing MMC: Media Center
- Yanqing Olympic Village
- Yanqing Medals Plaza

== Zhangjiakou Cluster ==
- Zhangjiakou National Cross-Country Centre: Cross-country skiing, Nordic combined (Cross country)
- Zhangjiakou National Ski Jumping Centre: Ski jumping, Nordic combined (Ski jumping)
- Zhangjiakou National Biathlon Centre: Biathlon
- Genting Snow Park: Snowboarding, Freestyle skiing
- Zhangjiakou Mountain Broadcast Centre: International Broadcast Center
- Zhangjiakou Mountain Press Centre: Main press center
- Zhangjiakou Olympic Village
- Zhangjiakou Medals Plaza
