= Adam Lambert (snowboarder) =

Australian snowboarder (born 1997)

Personal information
- Nickname: Lambo
- Born: 5 October 1997 (age 29) Jindabyne, New South Wales, Australia
- Height: 173 cm (5 ft 8 in)

Sport
- Country: Australia
- Sport: Snowboarding
- Event: Snowboard cross

Adam Lambert (born 5 October 1997) is an Australian snowboarder who specialises in the snowboard cross.

He made his World Cup debut in 2017, has competed at five FIS Snowboard World Championships and has represented Australia at the 2018, 2022 and 2026 Winter Olympics.

== Results ==
=== Olympic Winter Games ===
As of 18 February 2026

| Competition | Individual snowboard cross | Mixed team snowbaord cross |
|---|---|---|
| (South Korea) 2018 Pyeongchang | 29 | — |
| (China) 2022 Beijing | 22 | 13 |
| (Italy) 2026 Milano Cortina | 29 | 4 |

=== World Championships ===
As of 18 February 2026

| Competition | Individual snowboard cross | Mixed team snowboard cross |
|---|---|---|
| (Spain) 2017 Sierra Nevada | 6 | 9 |
| (United States) 2019 Solitude | 11 | — |
| (Sweden) 2021 Idre Fjäll | 26 | — |
| (Georgia (country)) 2023 Bakuriani | 8 | — |
| (Switzerland) 2025 Engadin | 9 | 6 |
