= Mick Dierdorff =

American snowboarder (born 1991)

Personal information
- Born: April 30, 1991 (age 35) Bellevue, Washington, U.S.
- Height: 5 ft 6 in (168 cm)
- Weight: 185 lb (84 kg)

Sport
- Country: United States
- Sport: Snowboarding
- Event: Snowboard cross
- College team: Utah
- Club: Steamboat Springs Winter Sports Club
Medal record
Men's snowboarding
Representing the United States
World Championships
Gold medal – first place	2019 Utah	Snowboard cross
Gold medal – first place	2019 Utah	Mixed team snowboard cross

Mick Dierdorff (born April 30, 1991) is a former American snowboarder. He competed in the 2018 Winter Olympics and the 2022 Winter Olympics.

He participated at the FIS Freestyle Ski and Snowboarding World Championships 2019, winning a gold medal. On March 18, 2023, Dierdorff announced his retirement.
