= Lukas Pachner =

Austrian snowboarder (born 1991)

Personal information
- Born: 5 December 1991 (age 34) Vienna, Austria
- Height: 1.80 m (5 ft 11 in)
- Weight: 96 kg (212 lb)

Sport
- Country: Austria
- Sport: Snowboarding

Lukas Pachner (born 5 December 1991) is an Austrian snowboarder. He competed in the 2018 Winter Olympics and the 2022 Winter Olympics.
