= Merlin Surget =

French snowboarder (born 1999)

Personal information
- Nickname: L’Enchanteur
- Born: 3 December 1999 (age 26) Sallanches, France
- Height: 1.78 m (5 ft 10 in)

Sport
- Country: France
- Sport: Snowboarding
Medal record
Men's snowboarding
Representing France
World Championships
| Bronze medal – third place | 2023 Bakuriani | Mixed team snowboard cross |

Merlin “L’Enchanteur” Surget (born 3 December 1999) is a French snowboarder. He competed in the 2018 Winter Olympics.
