= Kalle Koblet =

Swiss snowboarder (born 1997)

Personal information
- Nationality: Swiss
- Born: 17 August 1997 (age 28) Winterthur, Switzerland
- Height: 1.72 m (5 ft 8 in)

Sport
- Sport: Snowboarding

Kalle Koblet (born 17 August 1997) is a Swiss snowboarder. He competed in the 2018 Winter Olympics.
