= Snowboard cross =

Snowboard racing competition

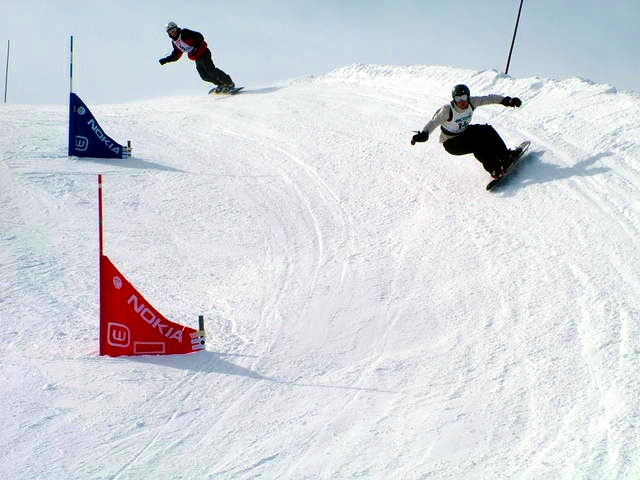
- Snowboarders in a competition
- Highest governing body: International Ski and Snowboard Federation (FIS)
- Nicknames: "boardercross"
- First played: 1991; 35 years ago

Characteristics
- Contact: Incidental, occasional collision between racers
- Type: Snowboard competition; Racing sport; Winter sport
- Equipment: Snowboard; helmet; mouthguard (recommended); body armor
- Venue: Ski hill/slope, piste; Courses share common traits with motorcycle motocross courses

Presence
- Olympic: Yes, debut: 2006

Snowboard cross, also known as SBX or boardercross, is a snowboard competition in which four to six competitors race down a course. Snowboard cross courses are typically quite narrow and include cambered turns, various types of jumps, berms, rollers, drops, steep and flat sections designed to challenge the riders' ability to stay in control while maintaining maximum speed. Mid-race accidents are expected among racers.

Snowboard cross courses share common traits with motorcycle motocross courses, hence the similarity between the names of each sport. Competition format is typically a time trial followed by a knock-out tournament.

== History ==
When Steven Rechtschaffner and partner Greg Stump had run out of ideas for segments for a TV show they were producing for Fox TV called Greg Stump's World of Extremes, Rechtschaffner recalled the race concept that had been in his head for years. Given the need to come up with a final segment, Rechtschaffner, a passionate snowboarder, pitched the idea to Stump, who loved it, and Blackcomb Mountain, who put up prize money and snowcat time in order to build the first course in 1991. John Graham, who was Stump's business manager, was credited with conceiving the name boardercross. After being seen on the Fox TV show and re-aired on MTV Sports, others began staging boardercross events in Canada, the U.S. and Australia. Rechtschaffner travelled to many of these events in order to help them learn how to build the boardercross courses.

Rechtschaffner had trademarked the name boardercross primarily as a way to ensure that people putting on events did so in a way that was safe, exciting and respectful to the world of snowboarding. He denied the ski sanctioning body FIS the rights to use the name "boardercross", as he shared the majority of snowboarders' belief that a ski sanctioning body should not be in charge of snowboarding events. That’s why boardercross is referred to by the FIS as “snowboard cross” in Olympic events, even though the overwhelming majority of boardercross racers still refer to their sport by the original term.

In 2000, Rechtschaffner channeled the spirit of boardercross into a series of hit video games he produced for Electronic Arts called SSX, which sold over 8 million copies over the following years.

In 2006, boardercross (referred to as snowboard cross) became an official event at the Turin Olympic Games and subsequent Winter Olympics.

== Equipment ==
All participants use a snowboard in competition. The snowboard should be fairly heavy and stiff (but not a hard board). Helmets are required equipment for racing in FIS sanctioned events. A mouth guard, though not always required, is recommended. Since participants are competing side-by-side, tight clothing is essential to ensure that they do not get entangled with each other. As competition increases in intensity some riders choose to wear body armor (like back and spine protectors) to ensure greater safety while competing at high speeds where crashes can be dangerous.

== Major competitions ==
The FIS Snowboard World Cup is an annual snowboarding competition, arranged by the International Ski Federation (FIS) since 1996. The FIS Snowboarding World Championships is the world championship organized by the FIS, held every two years. Boardercross had been an event in every X Games since their start in 1997. However, it was dropped after the 2012 X Games only to be reintroduced in 2014. It made its Winter Olympics debut in 2006.

== In culture ==
Early releases in the EA Sports SSX (Snowboard Supercross) series of video games were loosely based on boardercross. Sonic Riders, a Sonic the Hedgehog racing game in which SEGA characters race on hoverboards, is partly inspired by boardercross.

== See also ==
- Ski cross
- Ice cross downhill
- FIS Snowboard World Cup
- Men's and Women's events at the 2026 Winter Olympics
- Kayak cross
- Four-cross
- Skate cross
