= FIS Snowboarding World Championships 2011 – Men's snowboard cross =

The men's snowboard cross competition of the FIS Snowboarding World Championships 2011 was held at Alabaus in La Molina, Spain between January 17 and 18, 2011. 69 athletes from 27 countries competed.

The qualification round was completed on January 17, while the elimination round was completed on January 18.

== Results ==
=== Qualification ===
Rank	Bib	Name	Country	Run 1	Rank	Run 2	Rank	Best	Diff	Notes
1	48	Markus Schairer	Austria	54:69	3	53:83	1	53:83		Q
2	47	Pierre Vaultier	France	55:03	6	54:41	2	54:41	0.58	Q
3	34	Luca Matteotti	Italy	54:95	5	54:47	3	54:47	0.64	Q
4	38	Alex Pullin	Australia	54:55	1	1:06:97	59	54:55	0.72	Q
5	56	Emanuel Perathoner	Italy	54:61	2	55:24	8	54:61	0.78	Q
6	60	William Bankes	France	54:86	4	54:78	4	54:78	0.95	Q
7	55	Konstantin Schad	Germany	55:05	7	55:87	18	55:05	1.22	Q
8	36	Alberto Schiavon	Italy	55:65	14	55:09	5	55:09	1.26	Q
9	54	Omar Visintin	Italy	55:23	8	55:10	6	55:10	1.27	Q
10	41	Nate Holland	United States	55:60	12	55:22	7	55:22	1.39	Q
11	49	Fabio Caduff	Switzerland	55:83	18	55:28	9	55:28	1.45	Q
12	51	Alex Deibold	United States	55:31	9	56:34	25	55:31	1.48	Q
13	39	Tony Ramoin	France	55:41	10	55:84	16	55:41	1.58	Q
14	44	Paul-Henri De LeRue	France	55:43	11	DSQ		55:43	1.60	Q
15	46	David Speiser	Germany	55:96	20	55:44	10	55:44	1.61	Q
16	42	Jonathan Cheever	United States	55.62	13	55.70	13	55:62	1.79	Q
17	37	Michael Haemmerle	Austria	55:88	19	55:63	11	55:63	1.80	Q
18	43	Mateusz Ligocki	Poland	56:84	33	55:66	12	55:66	1.83	Q
19	73	Anton Lindfors	Finland	55:69	15	55:85	17	55:69	1.86	Q
20	64	Hanno Douschan	Austria	55:69	15	56:25	23	55:69	1.86	Q
21	45	Seth Wescott	United States	56:04	21	55:72	14	55:72	1.89	Q
22	35	Francois Boivin	Canada	55:74	17	56:29	24	55:74	1.91	Q
23	65	David Bakes	Czech Republic	DNF		55:75	15	55:75	1.92	Q
24	40	Kevin Hill	Canada	56.21	24	56.08	19	56.08	2.25	Q
25	53	Marvin James	Switzerland	56.10	22	56:45	27	56:10	2.27	Q
26	68	Michal Novotny	Czech Republic	56:50	29	56:13	20	56:13	2.30	Q
27	70	Cleve Johnson	Netherlands	56:16	23	56:62	30	56:16	2.33	Q
28	63	Joachim Havikhagen	Norway	56:53	30	56:17	21	56:17	2.34	Q
29	69	Hans Reichen	Switzerland	56:45	27	56:18	22	56:18	2.35	Q
30	33	Tom Velisek	Canada	56:30	25	56:83	33	56:30	2.47	Q
31	66	Rok Rogelj	Slovenia	56:46	28	56:36	26	56:36	2.53	Q
32	52	Andrey Boldykov	Russia	56:40	26	56:91	35	56:40	2.57	Q
33	79	Emil Novak	Czech Republic	56:54	31	56:79	31	56:54	2.71	
34	59	Nikolay Olyunin	Russia	57:07	35	56:56	28	56:56	2.73	
35	57	Maciej Jodko	Poland	56.70	32	56:57	29	56:57	2.74	
36	71	Stian Sivertzen	Norway	DSQ		56:79	31	56:79	2.96	
37	89	Regino Hernandez	Spain	57:58	37	56:86	34	56:86	3.03	
38	50	Dan Csokonay	Canada	57.00	34	57:82	42	57.00	3.17	
39	58	Mathias Schoepf	Austria	57:83	39	57.01	36	57.01	3.18	
40	67	Toms Vasins	Latvia	57:37	36	57:13	37	57:13	3.30	
41	62	Alexis Tsokos	Greece	57:86	40	57:17	38	57:17	3.34	
42	86	Elias Koivumaa	Finland	58:23	42	57:36	29	57:36	3.53	
43	83	Jakub Flejsar	Czech Republic	1:01:26	53	57:36	39	57:36	3.53	
44	61	Matija Mihic	Slovenia	58:69	44	57:56	41	57:56	3.73	
45	80	Jussi Taka	Finland	57:76	38	58:63	48	57:76	3.93	
46	72	Tim Watter	Switzerland	1:01:58	55	57:88	43	57:88	4.05	
47	94	Geza Kinda	Romania	58:18	41	57:93	44	57:93	4.10	
48	85	Shinya Momono	Japan	59:27	49	58:32	45	58:32	4.49	
49	90	Vitaly Kartsev	Russia	58:59	43	58:52	46	58:52	4.69	
50	75	Marcin Bocian	Poland	1:03:47	56	58:62	47	58:62	4.79	
51	81	Lucas Eguibar	Spain	58:77	45	59:27	53	58:77	4.94	
52	87	Laro Herrero	Spain	59:12	47	58:80	49	58:80	4.97	
53	82	Anton Chepkasov	Russia	59:35	50	58:93	50	58:93	5.10	
54	78	Franco Ruffini	Argentina	59.01	46	1:04:96	58	59.01	5.18	
55	88	Thomas Bankes	United Kingdom	1:05:07	57	59.03	51	59.03	5.20	
56	76	Inaqui Irarrazabal	Chile	59.20	48	59.07	52	59.07	5.24	
57	74	Magnar Freimuth	Estonia	1:01:29	54	59.67	54	59.67	5.84	
58	84	Harold Haekkinen	Finland	1:00:55	51	1:00:32	55	1:00:32	6.49	
59	91	Lucas Saez	Spain	1:00:60	52	1:04:80	57	1:00:60	6.77	
60	77	Ivar Kruusenberg	Estonia	1:14:09	60	1:01:99	56	1:01:99	8.16	
61	95	Aleksey Vakurin	Kyrgyzstan	1:12:87	59	1:07:44	60	1:12:87	13.61	
62	97	Timur Gubaev	Kyrgyzstan	1:11:70	58	DNS		1:11:70	17.87	
63	101	Razvan Dumbrava	Romania	1:15:76	61	DNS		1:15:76	21.93	
64	100	Nicki Randeris Lund	Denmark	1:16:67	62	1:18:73	61	1:16:67	22.84	
	96	Andrei Subran	Romania	DNF		DNS				
	93	Anastassios Zarkadas	Greece	DNF		DNS				
	99	Vladimir Komissarov	Kyrgyzstan	DNS		DNS				
	98	Aleksey Vakurin	Kyrgyzstan	DNS		DNS				
	92	Jin-Yong Woo	South Korea	DNS		DNS				

=== Elimination round ===
==== 1/8 round ====
The top 32 qualifiers advanced to the 1/8 round. From here, they participated in four-person elimination races, with the top two from each race advancing.

Heat 1

Rank	Bib	Name	Country	Notes
1	1	Markus Schairer	Austria	Q
2	16	Jonathan Cheever	United States	Q
3	17	Michael Haemmerle	Austria	
4	32	Andrey Boldykov	Russia	

Heat 2

Rank	Bib	Name	Country	Notes
1	8	Alberto Schiavon	Italy	Q
2	24	Kevin Hill	Canada	Q
3	25	Marvin James	Switzerland	
4	9	Omar Visintin	Italy	

Heat 3

Rank	Bib	Name	Country	Notes
1	21	Seth Wescott	United States	Q
2	28	Joachim Havikhagen	Norway	Q
3	12	Alex Deibold	United States	
4	5	Emanuel Perathoner	Italy	

Heat 4

Rank	Bib	Name	Country	Notes
1	4	Alex Pullin	Australia	Q
2	29	Hans Reichen	Switzerland	Q
4	20	Hanno Douschan	Austria	
4	13	Tony Ramoin	France	

Heat 5

Rank	Bib	Name	Country	Notes
1	3	Luca Matteotti	Italy	Q
2	14	Paul-Henri De LeRue	France	Q
3	19	Anton Lindfors	Finland	
4	30	Tom Velisek	Canada	

Heat 6

Rank	Bib	Name	Country	Notes
1	22	Francois Boivin	Canada	Q
2	6	William Bankes	France	Q
3	11	Fabio Caduff	Switzerland	
4	27	Cleve Johnson	Netherlands	

Heat 7

Rank	Bib	Name	Country	Notes
1	26	Michal Novotny	Czech Republic	Q
2	10	Nate Holland	United States	Q
3	7	Konstantin Schad	Germany	
4	23	David Bakes	Czech Republic	

Heat 8

Rank	Bib	Name	Country	Notes
1	2	Pierre Vaultier	France	Q
2	15	David Speiser	Germany	Q
3	31	Rok Rogelj	Slovenia	
4	18	Mateusz Ligocki	Poland	

==== 1/4 Round ====
Heat 1

Rank	Bib	Name	Country	Notes
1	8	Alberto Schiavon	Italy	Q
2	16	Jonathan Cheever	United States	Q
3	1	Markus Schairer	Austria	
4	24	Kevin Hill	Canada	

Heat 2

Rank	Bib	Name	Country	Notes
1	4	Alex Pullin	Australia	Q
2	21	Seth Wescott	United States	Q
3	28	Joachim Havikhagen	Norway	
4	29	Hans Reichen	Switzerland	

Heat 3

Rank	Bib	Name	Country	Notes
1	3	Luca Matteotti	Italy	Q
2	22	Francois Boivin	Canada	Q
3	14	Paul-Henri De La Rue	France	
4	6	William Bankes	France	

Heat 4

Rank	Bib	Name	Country	Notes
1	2	Pierre Vaultier	France	Q
2	10	Nate Holland	United States	Q
3	15	David Speiser	Germany	
4	26	Michal Novotny	Czech Republic	

==== 1/2 Round ====
Heat 1

Rank	Bib	Name	Country	Notes
1	21	Seth Wescott	United States	Q
2	4	Alex Pullin	Australia	Q
3	16	Jonathan Cheever	United States	
4	8	Alberto Schiavon	Italy	

Heat 2

Rank	Bib	Name	Country	Notes
1	3	Luca Matteotti	Italy	Q
2	10	Nate Holland	United States	Q
3	22	Francois Boivin	Canada	
4	2	Pierre Vaultier	France	

==== Final round ====
Small Final

Rank	Bib	Name	Country	Notes
5	2	Pierre Vaultier	France	
6	8	Alberto Schiavon	Italy	
7	22	Francois Boivin	Canada	
8	16	Jonathan Cheever	United States	

Final

Rank	Bib	Name	Country	Notes
1st place, gold medalist(s)	4	Alex Pullin	Australia	
2nd place, silver medalist(s)	21	Seth Wescott	United States	
3rd place, bronze medalist(s)	10	Nate Holland	United States	
4	3	Luca Matteotti	Italy	
