= FIS Snowboarding World Championships 2013 – Men's snowboard cross =

The men's snowboard cross competition of the FIS Snowboarding World Championships 2013 was held at Stoneham-et-Tewkesbury, Québec, Canada between January 24 and 26, 2011.

The qualification round was completed on January 24, while the elimination round was completed on January 26.

== Medalists ==
Gold	Alex Pullin; Australia (AUS)
Silver	Markus Schairer; Austria (AUT)
Bronze	Stian Sivertzen; Norway (NOR)

== Results ==
=== Qualification ===
Rank	Bib	Name	Country	Run 1	Rank	Run 2	Rank	Best	Diff	Notes
1	64	Alex Pullin	Australia	1:02.15	1			1:02.15		Q
2	55	Markus Schairer	Austria	1:02.16	2			1:02.16	+0.01	Q
3	53	Lluis Marin Tarroch	Andorra	1:02.36	3			1:02.36	+0.21	Q
4	59	Christopher Robanske	Canada	1:02.41	4			1:02.41	+0.26	Q
5	63	Nick Baumgartner	United States	1:02.61	5			1:02.61	+0.46	Q
6	69	Robert Fagan	Canada	1:03.25	6			1:03.25	+1.10	Q
7	71	Kevin Hill	Canada	1:03.48	7			1:03.48	+1.33	Q
8	57	Stian Sivertzen	Norway	1:03.53	8			1:03.53	+1.38	Q
9	54	Nikolay Olyunin	Russia	1:03.57	9			1:03.57	+1.42	Q
10	66	Luca Matteotti	Italy	1:03.87	10			1:03.87	+1.72	Q
11	72	Anton Lindfors	Finland	1:03.90	11			1:03.90	+1.75	Q
12	50	Emanuel Perathoner	Italy	1:04.01	12			1:04.01	+1.86	Q
13	70	Cameron Bolton	Australia	1:04.14	13			1:04.14	+1.99	Q
13	60	Seth Wescott	United States	1:04.14	13			1:04.14	+1.99	Q
15	49	Omar Visintin	Italy	1:04.31	15			1:04.31	+2.16	Q
16	67	Lucas Eguibar	Spain	1:04.45	16			1:04.45	+2.30	Q
17	62	Andrey Boldykov	Russia	1:04.54	17			1:04.54	+2.39	Q
18	58	Jonathan Cheever	United States	1:04.73	18			1:04.73	+2.58	Q
19	68	Alessandro Hämmerle	Austria	1:04.75	19			1:04.75	+2.60	Q
20	77	Jarryd Hughes	Australia	1:04.83	20			1:04.83	+2.68	Q
21	51	Konstantin Schad	Germany	1:04.84	21			1:04.84	+2.69	Q
22	73	Tommaso Leoni	Italy	1:04.90	22			1:04.90	+2.75	Q
23	56	Pierre Vaultier	France	1:05.11	23			1:05.11	+2.96	Q
24	84	Jake Holden	Canada	1:05.14	24			1:05.14	+2.99	Q
25	104	Christian Ruud Myhre	Norway	1:13.28	53	1:05.12	1	1:05.12	+2.97	q
26	52	Tony Ramoin	France	1:05.21	25	1:07.16	5	1:05.21	+3.06	q
27	85	Michal Novotny	Czech Republic	1:05.27	26	1:07.90	13	1:05.27	+3.12	q
28	83	Cleve Johnson	Netherlands	1:05.62	27	1:06.43	3	1:05.62	+3.47	q
29	61	Mateusz Ligocki	Poland	1:05.62	27	DSQ		1:05.62	+3.47	q
30	65	Hagen Kearney	United States	1:05.66	29	1:06.46	4	1:05.66	+3.51	q
31	78	Michael Hämmerle	Austria	1:06.65	33	1:05.91	2	1:05.91	+3.76	q
32	74	Maciej Jodko	Poland	1:06.28	30	1:07.82	11	1:06.28	+4.13	q
33	76	Tim Watter	Switzerland	1:06.35	31	1:09.88	18	1:06.35	+4.20	q
34	91	Emil Novak	Czech Republic	1:06.51	32	1:07.70	8	1:06.51	+4.36	q
35	82	Paul-Henri de Le Rue	France	1:06.73	34	1:09.11	17	1:06.73	+4.58	q
36	89	Shinya Momono	Japan	1:06.84	35	DSQ		1:06.84	+4.69	q
37	96	Thomas Bankes	Great Britain	1:09.35	45	1:06.89	5	1:06.89	+4.74	q
38	86	Jussi Taka	Finland	1:06.90	36	1:10.44	20	1:06.90	+4.75	q
39	80	Rok Rogelj	Slovenia	1:07.17	38	1:07.00	6	1:07.00	+4.85	q
40	81	David Bakes	Czech Republic	1:07.03	37	1:09.02	16	1:07.03	+4.88	q
41	87	Daniil Dilman	Russia	1:07.31	39	1:11.02	21	1:07.31	+5.16	q
42	98	Folger Forsen	Sweden	1:10.90	51	1:07.71	9	1:07.71	+5.56	q
43	88	Regino Hernandez	Spain	1:07.74	40	1:08.77	15	1:07.74	+5.59	q
44	95	Steven Williams	Argentina	1:08.88	43	1:07.74	10	1:07.74	+5.59	q
45	97	Simon White	Argentina	DSQ		1:07.89	12	1:07.89	+5.74	q
46	79	Anton Koprivitsa	Russia	1:07.94	41	1:11.21	22	1:07.94	+5.79	q
47	90	Marvin James	Switzerland	1:11.38	52	1:08.29	14	1:08.29	+6.14	q
48	93	Laro Herrero	Spain	1:08.56	42	1:11.51	23	1:08.56	+6.41	q
49	75	Andy Fischer	Australia	1:09.12	44	1:12.30	26	1:09.12	+6.97	
50	92	Alexis Tsokos	Greece	1:09.49	46	1:09.99	19	1:09.49	+7.34	
51	100	Franco Ruffini	Argentina	1:10.26	47	DNF		1:10.26	+8.11	
52	106	Myles McNeany	Great Britain	1:10.59	48	1:22.38	30	1:10.59	+8.44	
53	105	Kequyen Lam	Portugal	1:10.64	49	1:17.69	28	1:10.64	+8.49	
54	94	Cody Logan	New Zealand	1:10.84	50	1:12.26	25	1:10.84	+8.69	
55	102	Jakub Flejsar	Czech Republic	DNF		1:12.16	24	1:12.16	+10.01	
56	101	Ivar Kruusenberg	Estonia	DSQ		1:15.11	27	1:15.11	+13.96	
57	99	Geza Kinda	Romania	1:16.61	54	1:36.26	32	1:16.61	+15.46	
58	108	Richard Rakoczy	Slovakia	1:20.84	55	1:19.92	29	1:19.92	+18.77	
59	103	Woo Jin-Yong	South Korea	DNF		1:26.82	31	1:26.82	+25.67	
60	110	Yannis Roy	Haiti	1:56.81	56	1:53.50	33	1:53.50	+52.35	
	109	Tadas Malinauskas	Lithuania	DNF		DNS				
	107	Andrei Subran	Romania	DNS		DNS				
	111	Anastassios Zarkadas	Greece	DNS		DNS				

== Elimination round ==
=== 1/8 Finals ===
The top 48 qualifiers advanced to the 1/8 finals. From here, they participated in six-person elimination races, with the top three from each race advancing.

Heat 1

Rank	Bib	Name	Country	Notes
1	1	Alex Pullin	Australia	Q
2	16	Lucas Eguibar	Spain	Q
3	17	Andrey Boldykov	Russia	Q
4	32	Maciej Jodko	Poland	
5	33	Tim Watter	Switzerland	
6	48	Laro Herrero	Spain	

Heat 2

Rank	Bib	Name	Country	Notes
1	9	Nikolay Olyunin	Russia	Q
2	8	Stian Sivertzen	Norway	Q
3	24	Jake Holden	Canada	Q
4	40	David Bakes	Czech Republic	
5	25	Christian Ruud Myhre	Norway	
6	41	Daniil Dilman	Russia	

Heat 3

Rank	Bib	Name	Country	Notes
1	5	Nick Baumgartner	United States	Q
2	12	Emanuel Perathoner	France	Q
3	28	Cleve Johnson	Netherlands	Q
4	21	Konstantin Schad	Germany	
5	44	Steven Williams	Argentina	
6	37	Thomas Bankes	Great Britain	

Heat 4

Rank	Bib	Name	Country	Notes
1	4	Christopher Robanske	Canada	Q
2	20	Jarryd Hughes	Australia	Q
3	29	Mateusz Ligocki	Poland	Q
4	36	Shinya Momono	Japan	
5	45	Simon White	Argentina	
6	13	Cameron Bolton	Australia	

Heat 5

Rank	Bib	Name	Country	Notes
1	3	Lluis Marin Tarroch	Andorra	Q
2	19	Alessandro Hämmerle	Austria	Q
3	30	Hagen Kearney	United States	Q
4	14	Seth Wescott	United States	
5	35	Paul-Henri de Le Rue	France	
6	46	Anton Koprivitsa	Russia	

Heat 6

Rank	Bib	Name	Country	Notes
1	6	Robert Fagan	Canada	Q
2	11	Anton Lindfors	Finland	Q
3	22	Tommaso Leoni	Italy	Q
4	38	Jussi Taka	Finland	
5	43	Regino Hernandez	Spain	
6	27	Michal Novotny	Czech Republic	

Heat 7

Rank	Bib	Name	Country	Notes
1	23	Pierre Vaultier	France	Q
2	10	Luca Matteotti	Italy	Q
3	26	Tony Ramoin	France	Q
4	42	Folger Forsen	Sweden	
5	7	Kevin Hill	Canada	
6	39	Rok Rogelj	Slovenia	

Heat 8

Rank	Bib	Name	Country	Notes
1	2	Markus Schairer	Austria	Q
2	15	Omar Visintin	Italy	Q
3	34	Emil Novak	Czech Republic	Q
4	31	Michael Hämmerle	Austria	
5	18	Jonathan Cheever	United States	
6	47	Marvin James	Switzerland	

=== Quarterfinals ===
Heat 1

Rank	Bib	Name	Country	Notes
1	1	Alex Pullin	Australia	Q
2	8	Stian Sivertzen	Norway	Q
3	17	Andrey Boldykov	Russia	Q
4	16	Lucas Eguibar	Spain	
5	9	Nikolay Olyunin	Russia	
6	24	Jake Holden	Canada	DSQ

Heat 2

Rank	Bib	Name	Country	Notes
1	4	Christopher Robanske	Canada	Q
2	5	Nick Baumgartner	United States	Q
3	20	Jarryd Hughes	Australia	Q
4	29	Mateusz Ligocki	Poland	
5	12	Emanuel Perathoner	France	
6	28	Cleve Johnson	Netherlands	

Heat 3

Rank	Bib	Name	Country	Notes
1	19	Alessandro Hämmerle	Austria	Q
2	6	Robert Fagan	Canada	Q
3	11	Anton Lindfors	Finland	Q
4	22	Tommaso Leoni	Italy	
5	30	Hagen Kearney	United States	
6	3	Lluis Marin Tarroch	Andorra	

Heat 4

Rank	Bib	Name	Country	Notes
1	2	Markus Schairer	Austria	Q
2	23	Pierre Vaultier	France	Q
3	26	Tony Ramoin	France	Q
4	34	Emil Novak	Czech Republic	
5	10	Luca Matteotti	Italy	
6	15	Omar Visintin	Italy	DSQ

=== Semifinals ===
Heat 1

Rank	Bib	Name	Country	Notes
1	1	Alex Pullin	Australia	Q
2	8	Stian Sivertzen	Norway	Q
3	17	Andrey Boldykov	Russia	Q
4	20	Jarryd Hughes	Australia	
5	4	Christopher Robanske	Canada	
6	5	Nick Baumgartner	United States	

Heat 2

Rank	Bib	Name	Country	Notes
1	2	Markus Schairer	Austria	Q
2	23	Pierre Vaultier	France	Q
3	19	Alessandro Hämmerle	Austria	Q
4	26	Tony Ramoin	France	
5	11	Anton Lindfors	Finland	
6	6	Robert Fagan	Canada	

=== Finals ===
==== Small Finals ====
Rank	Bib	Name	Country	Notes
7	5	Nick Baumgartner	United States	
8	6	Robert Fagan	Canada	
9	26	Tony Ramoin	France	
10	11	Anton Lindfors	Finland	
11	20	Jarryd Hughes	Australia	
12	4	Christopher Robanske	Canada	

==== Big Finals ====
Rank	Bib	Name	Country	Notes
1st place, gold medalist(s)	1	Alex Pullin	Australia	
2nd place, silver medalist(s)	2	Markus Schairer	Austria	
3rd place, bronze medalist(s)	8	Stian Sivertzen	Norway	
4	23	Pierre Vaultier	France	
5	17	Andrey Boldykov	Russia	
6	19	Alessandro Hämmerle	Austria	
