= Snowboarding at the 2010 Winter Olympics – Men's snowboard cross =

Men's snowboard cross at the XXI Olympic Winter Games
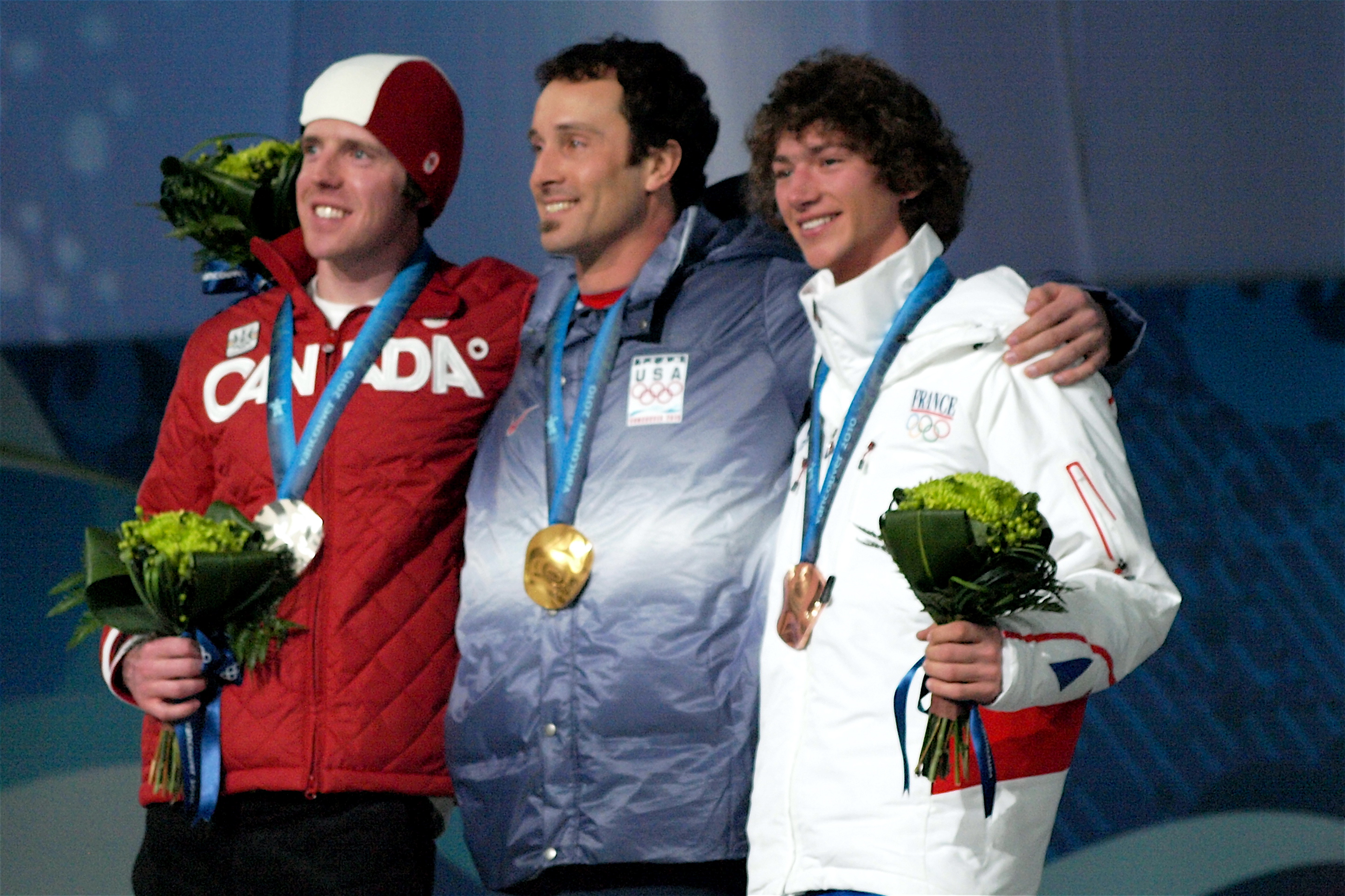
- From left to right: Mike Robertson of Canada (silver), Seth Wescott of the United States (gold), Tony Ramoin of France (bronze)
- Venue: Cypress Mountain
- Date: February 15, 2010
- Competitors: 35 from 15 nations

Medalists
1st place, gold medalist(s)		Seth Wescott	United States
2nd place, silver medalist(s)		Mike Robertson	Canada
3rd place, bronze medalist(s)		Tony Ramoin	France

The men's snowboard cross competition of the Vancouver 2010 Olympics was held at Cypress Mountain on February 15, 2010.

== Results ==
=== Qualification ===
Rank	Bib	Name	Country	Run 1	Run 2	Best	Notes
1	33	Alex Pullin	Australia	1:21.17	1:20.15	1:20.15	Q
2	35	Graham Watanabe	United States	1:22.25	1:20.53	1:20.53	Q
3	40	Mike Robertson	Canada	1:21.73	1:21.24	1:21.24	Q
4	50	Xavier de Le Rue	France	1:21.33	1:21.86	1:21.33	Q
5	39	Mario Fuchs	Austria	1:21.84	1:21.53	1:21.53	Q
6	36	Pierre Vaultier	France	1:23.37	1:21.63	1:21.63	Q
7	45	Nick Baumgartner	United States	1:22.64	1:21.70	1:21.70	Q
8	47	Nate Holland	United States	1:21.78	DSQ	1:21.78	Q
9	56	Damon Hayler	Australia	1:22.10	1:21.81	1:21.81	Q
10	38	Robert Fagan	Canada	1:23.06	1:21.87	1:21.87	Q
11	49	Drew Neilson	Canada	1:22.01	1:22.34	1:22.01	Q
12	42	Lukas Gruener	Austria	1:22.04	1:24.35	1:22.04	Q
13	55	Alberto Schiavon	Italy	1:22.58	1:22.33	1:22.33	Q
14	52	Tony Ramoin	France	1:23.62	1:22.34	1:22.34	Q
15	46	Francois Boivin	Canada	1:32.72	1:22.75	1:22.75	Q
16	53	Fabio Caduff	Switzerland	1:24.84	1:22.78	1:22.78	Q
17	41	Seth Wescott	United States	1:25.69	1:22.87	1:22.87	Q
18	62	Stefano Pozzolini	Italy	1:24.41	1:23.08	1:23.08	Q
19	61	Federico Raimo	Italy	1:23.16	1:23.35	1:23.16	Q
20	65	Andrey Boldykov	Russia	1:23.28	1:30.20	1:23.28	Q
21	34	Markus Schairer	Austria	1:29.56	1:23.33	1:23.33	Q
22	60	Rok Rogelj	Slovenia	1:23.37	1:23.50	1:23.37	Q
23	43	Paul-Henri de Le Rue	France	1:23.60	1:23.57	1:23.57	Q
24	51	Stian Sivertzen	Norway	1:25.08	1:23.80	1:23.80	Q
25	63	Joachim Havikhagen	Norway	1:23.87	1:25.23	1:23.87	Q
26	48	David Speiser	Germany	1:27.37	1:23.92	1:23.92	Q
27	59	Maciej Jodko	Poland	1:24.76	1:24.11	1:24.11	Q
28	54	Mateusz Ligocki	Poland	1:27.03	1:24.11	1:24.11	Q
29	37	Michal Novotný	Czech Republic	1:24.23	1:24.53	1:24.23	Q
30	58	Simone Malusa	Italy	1:24.88	1:24.53	1:24.53	Q
31	66	Regino Hernández	Spain	1:28.66	1:25.90	1:25.90	Q
32	44	David Bakeš	Czech Republic	DNF	1:26.05	1:26.05	Q
33	57	Konstantin Schad	Germany	1:26.69	DNF	1:26.69	
34	67	Lluis Marin Tarroch	Andorra	DNF	1:47.36	1:47.36	
	64	Jordi Font	Spain	DNF	DNS		

=== Elimination round ===
==== 1/8 round ====
The top 32 qualifiers advanced to the 1/8 round. From here, they participated in four-person elimination races, with the top two from each race advancing.

Heat 1

Rank	Bib	Name	Country	Notes
1	17	Seth Wescott	United States	Q
2	16	Fabio Caduff	Switzerland	Q
3	1	Alex Pullin	Australia	
4	32	David Bakeš	Czech Republic	

Heat 2

Rank	Bib	Name	Country	Notes
1	8	Nate Holland	United States	Q
2	9	Damon Hayler	Australia	Q
3	25	Joachim Havikhagen	Norway	
4	24	Stian Sivertzen	Norway	

Heat 3

Rank	Bib	Name	Country	Notes
1	12	Lukas Gruener	Austria	Q
2	5	Mario Fuchs	Austria	Q
3	21	Markus Schairer	Austria	
4	28	Mateusz Ligocki	Poland	

Heat 4

Rank	Bib	Name	Country	Notes
1	20	Andrey Boldykov	Russia	Q
2	29	Michal Novotny	Czech Republic	Q
4	13	Alberto Schiavon	Italy	
4	4	Xavier de Le Rue	France	

Heat 5

Rank	Bib	Name	Country	Notes
1	3	Mike Robertson	Canada	Q
2	14	Tony Ramoin	France	Q
3	30	Simone Malusa	Italy	
4	19	Federico Raimo	Italy	

Heat 6

Rank	Bib	Name	Country	Notes
1	6	Pierre Vaultier	France	Q
2	11	Drew Neilson	Canada	Q
3	27	Maciej Jodko	Poland	
4	22	Rok Rogelj	Slovenia	

Heat 7

Rank	Bib	Name	Country	Notes
1	10	Robert Fagan	Canada	Q
2	26	David Speiser	Germany	Q
3	23	Paul-Henri de Le Rue	France	
4	7	Nick Baumgartner	United States	

Heat 8

Rank	Bib	Name	Country	Notes
1	15	Francois Boivin	Canada	Q
2	18	Stefano Pozzolini	Italy	Q
3	2	Graham Watanabe	United States	
4	31	Regino Hernández	Spain	

==== Quarterfinals ====
Quarterfinal 1

Rank	Bib	Name	Country	Notes
1	17	Seth Wescott	United States	Q
2	8	Nate Holland	United States	Q
3	16	Fabio Caduff	Switzerland	
4	9	Damon Hayler	Australia	

Quarterfinal 2

Rank	Bib	Name	Country	Notes
1	5	Mario Fuchs	Austria	Q
2	12	Lukas Gruener	Austria	Q
3	20	Andrey Boldykov	Russia	
4	13	Michal Novotny	Czech Republic	

Quarterfinal 3

Rank	Bib	Name	Country	Notes
1	3	Mike Robertson	Canada	Q
2	14	Tony Ramoin	France	Q
3	6	Pierre Vaultier	France	
4	11	Drew Neilson	Canada	

Quarterfinal 4

Rank	Bib	Name	Country	Notes
1	10	Robert Fagan	Canada	Q
2	26	David Speiser	Germany	Q
3	18	Stefano Pozzolini	Italy	
4	15	Francois Boivin	Canada	

==== Semifinals ====
Semifinal 1

Rank	Bib	Name	Country	Notes
1	8	Nate Holland	United States	Q
2	17	Seth Wescott	United States	Q
3	12	Lukas Gruener	Austria	
4	5	Mario Fuchs	Austria	

Semifinal 2

Rank	Bib	Name	Country	Notes
1	3	Mike Robertson	Canada	Q
2	14	Tony Ramoin	France	Q
3	10	Robert Fagan	Canada	
4	26	David Speiser	Germany	

==== Finals ====
Small Final

Rank	Bib	Name	Country
5	10	Robert Fagan	Canada
6	12	Lukas Gruener	Austria
7	5	Mario Fuchs	Austria
8	26	David Speiser	Germany

Large Final

Rank	Bib	Name	Country
1st place, gold medalist(s)	17	Seth Wescott	United States
2nd place, silver medalist(s)	3	Mike Robertson	Canada
3rd place, bronze medalist(s)	14	Tony Ramoin	France
4	8	Nate Holland	United States

=== Final Classification ===
Rank	Seed	Bib	Name	Country	Notes
17	1	33	Alex Pullin	Australia	
18	2	35	Graham Watanabe	United States	
2nd place, silver medalist(s)	3	40	Mike Robertson	Canada	
19	4	50	Xavier de Le Rue	France	
7	5	39	Mario Fuchs	Austria	
9	6	36	Pierre Vaultier	France	
20	7	45	Nick Baumgartner	United States	
4	8	47	Nate Holland	United States	
10	9	56	Damon Hayler	Australia	
5	10	38	Robert Fagan	Canada	
11	11	49	Drew Neilson	Canada	
6	12	42	Lukas Gruener	Austria	
21	13	55	Alberto Schiavon	Italy	
3rd place, bronze medalist(s)	14	52	Tony Ramoin	France	
12	15	46	Francois Boivin	Canada	
13	16	53	Fabio Caduff	Switzerland	
1st place, gold medalist(s)	17	41	Seth Wescott	United States	
14	18	62	Stefano Pozzolini	Italy	
22	19	61	Federico Raimo	Italy	
15	20	65	Andrey Boldykov	Russia	
23	21	34	Markus Schairer	Austria	
24	22	60	Rok Rogelj	Slovenia	
25	23	43	Paul-Henri de Le Rue	France	
26	24	51	Stian Sivertzen	Norway	
27	25	63	Joachim Havikhagen	Norway	
8	26	48	David Speiser	Germany	
28	27	59	Maciej Jodko	Poland	
29	28	54	Mateusz Ligocki	Poland	
16	29	37	Michal Novotný	Czech Republic	
30	30	58	Simone Malusa	Italy	
31	31	66	Regino Hernández	Spain	
32	32	44	David Bakeš	Czech Republic	
33		57	Konstantin Schad	Germany	DNF
34		67	Lluis Marin Tarroch	Andorra	DNF
		64	Jordi Font	Spain	DNF
