= 2011–12 FIS Snowboard World Cup =

International snowboarding competition

2011–12 Snowboarding World Cup
Winners
- Overall men's: Janne Korpi (FIN)
- Overall women's: Cai Xuetong (CHN)
- Parallel slalom men's: Andreas Prommegger (AUT)
- Parallel slalom women's: Patrizia Kummer (SUI)
- Snowboard cross men's: Pierre Vaultier (FRA)
- Snowboard cross women's: Dominique Maltais (CAN)
- Halfpipe men's: Janne Korpi (FIN)
- Halfpipe women's: Cai Xuetong (CHN)
- Big Air men's: Janne Korpi (FIN)

Competitions
- Venues: 17
- Individual: 49
- Team: 2
- Cancelled: 6

The 2011–12 FIS Snowboard World Cup was a multi race tournament over a season for snowboarding. The season started on 28 August 2011 and ended on 17 March 2012. The World Cup was organised by the FIS which also runs world cups and championships in alpine skiing, cross-country skiing, ski jumping, Nordic combined, and freestyle skiing. The FIS Snowboarding World Cup consisted of the parallel slalom, snowboard cross and the halfpipe. The men's side of the world cup also consisted of three big air competitions.

== Men ==
=== Parallel Slalom ===
Date	Place	Classification	Winner	Second	Third	Report
13 October 2011	Landgraaf, Netherlands	Slalom	Roland Fischnaller (ITA)	Aaron March (ITA)	Andreas Prommegger (AUT)	
~~3 December 2011~~	Carezza, Italy	Giant Slalom	Cancelled due to lack of snow; rescheduled to 21 December			
~~4 December 2011~~	Carezza, Italy	Slalom	Cancelled due to lack of snow; rescheduled to 22 December			
15 December 2011	Telluride, United States	Giant Slalom	Benjamin Karl (AUT)	Andreas Prommegger (AUT)	Simon Schoch (SUI)	
21 December 2011 (Note: Rescheduled from 3 December 2011.)	Carezza, Italy	Giant Slalom	Roland Fischnaller (ITA)	Benjamin Karl (AUT)	Rok Flander (SLO)	
22 December 2011 (Note: Rescheduled from 4 December 2011.)	Carezza, Italy	Slalom	Benjamin Karl (AUT)	Simon Schoch (SUI)	Siegfried Grabner (AUT)	
13 January 2012	Jauerling, Austria	Slalom (night)	Andreas Prommegger (AUT)	Andrey Sobolev (RUS)	Roland Fischnaller (ITA)	
19 January 2012 (Note: Moved from Veysonnaz.)	Bad Gastein, Austria	Giant Slalom	Roland Fischnaller (ITA)	Aaron March (ITA)	Rok Flander (SLO)	
28 January 2012	Sudenfeld, Germany	Giant Slalom	Siegfried Grabner (AUT)	Lukas Mathies (AUT)	Andreas Prommegger (AUT)	
22 February 2012	Stoneham, Canada	Giant Slalom	Andreas Prommegger (AUT)	Manuel Veith (AUT)	Nevin Galmarini (SUI)	
3 March 2012	Moscow, Russia	Slalom	Roland Fischnaller (ITA)	Simon Schoch (SUI)	Andreas Prommegger (AUT)	
10 March 2012	La Molina, Spain	Giant Slalom	Andreas Prommegger (AUT)	Simon Schoch (SUI)	Benjamin Karl (AUT)	
17 March 2012	Valmalenco, Italy	Giant Slalom	Roland Fischnaller (ITA)	Manuel Veith (AUT)	Ingemar Walder (AUT)	

=== Snowboard Cross ===
Date	Place	Winner	Second	Third	Report
16 December 2011	Telluride, United States	Pierre Vaultier (FRA)	Christopher Robanske (CAN)	Nick Baumgartner (USA)	
17 December 2011	Telluride, United States (Team)	France; Pierre Vaultier; Xavier de le Rue	United States; Jonathan Cheever; Nick Baumgartner	Norway; Joachim Havikhagen; Stian Sivertzen	
15 January 2012	Bad Gastein, Austria	Cancelled due to lack of snow, rescheduled to 19 January in Veysonnaz			
19 January 2012	Veysonnaz, Switzerland	Andrey Boldykov (RUS)	Nate Holland (USA)	Pierre Vaultier (FRA)	
22 January 2012	Veysonnaz, Switzerland	Nate Holland (USA)	Markus Schairer (AUT)	Emanuel Perathoner (ITA)	
8 February 2012 (Note: Subject to bid)	Blue Mountain, Canada	Pierre Vaultier (FRA)	David Speiser (GER)	Nick Baumgartner (USA)	
21 February 2012	Stoneham, Canada	Pierre Vaultier (FRA)	Nikolay Olyunin (RUS)	Jonathan Cheever (USA)	
14 March 2012	Valmalenco, Italy	Stian Sivertzen (NOR)	Alex Tuttle (USA)	Tony Ramoin (FRA)	
16 March 2012	Valmalenco, Italy	Konstantin Schad (GER)	Andrey Boldykov (RUS)	Lluis Marin Tarroch (AND)	

=== Halfpipe ===
Date	Place	Winner	Second	Third	Report
28 August 2011	Cardrona, New Zealand	Janne Korpi (FIN)	Zhang Yiwei (CHN)	Dimi de Jong (NED)	
3 November 2011	Saas-Fee, Switzerland	Yuri Podladchikov (SUI)	Ryō Aono (JPN)	Janne Korpi (FIN)	
17 December 2011	Ruka, Finland	Markus Malin (FIN)	Steve Krijbolder (NED)	Aleksi Kumpulainen (FIN)	
23 February 2012	Stoneham, Canada	Nathan Johnstone (AUS)	Taku Hiraoka (JPN)	Janne Korpi (FIN)	
~~2 March 2012~~	Bardonecchia, Italy	Cancelled for economical reasons			

=== Big Air ===
Date	Place	Winner	Second	Third	Report
29 October 2011	London, United Kingdom	Janne Korpi (FIN)	Seppe Smits (BEL)	Joris Ouwerkerk (NED)	
~~12 November 2011~~	Barcelona, Spain	Cancelled			
19 November 2011	Stockholm, Sweden	Niklas Mattsson (SWE)	Michael Macho (AUT)	Alexey Sobolev (RUS)	
25 February 2012	Stoneham, Canada	Antoine Truchon (CAN)	Petja Piiroinen (FIN)	Matts Kulisek (CAN)	

=== Slopestyle ===
Date	Place	Winner	Second	Third	Report
~~4 February 2012~~	Jasná, Slovakia	Cancelled			
26 February 2012	Stoneham, Canada	Dimi de Jong (NED)	Jonathan Versteeg (CAN)	Maxence Parrot (CAN)	
~~4 March 2012~~	Bardonecchia, Italy	Cancelled for economical reasons			

== Women ==
=== Parallel Slalom ===
Date	Place	Classification	Winner	Second	Third	Report
13 October 2011	Landgraaf, Netherlands	Slalom	Fraenzi Maegert-Kohli (SUI)	Yekaterina Tudegesheva (RUS)	Marion Kreiner (AUT)	
~~3 December 2011~~	Carezza, Italy	Giant Slalom	Cancelled due to lack of snow; rescheduled to 21 December			
~~4 December 2011~~	Carezza, Italy	Slalom	Cancelled due to lack of snow; rescheduled to 22 December			
15 December 2011	Telluride, United States	Giant Slalom	Julia Dujmovits (AUT)	Fraenzi Maegert-Kohli (SUI)	Amelie Kober (GER)	
21 December 2011	Carezza, Italy	Giant Slalom	Caroline Calvé (CAN)	Amelie Kober (GER)	Marion Kreiner (AUT)	
22 December 2011	Carezza, Italy	Slalom	Patrizia Kummer (SUI)	Isabella Laböck (GER)	Anke Karstens (GER)	
13 January 2012	Jauerling, Austria	Slalom (night)	Patrizia Kummer (SUI)	Yekaterina Tudegesheva (RUS)	Marion Kreiner (AUT)	
19 January 2012	Bad Gastein, Austria	Giant Slalom	Patrizia Kummer (SUI)	Julie Zogg (SUI)	Marion Kreiner (AUT)	
28 January 2012	Sudenfeld, Germany	Giant Slalom	Amelie Kober (GER)	Marion Kreiner (AUT)	Yekaterina Tudegesheva (RUS)	
22 February 2012	Stoneham, Canada	Giant Slalom	Yekaterina Tudegesheva (RUS)	Julia Dujmovits (AUT)	Julie Zogg (SUI)	
3 March 2012	Moscow, Russia	Slalom	Patrizia Kummer (SUI)	Julia Dujmovits (AUT)	Julie Zogg (SUI)	
10 March 2012	La Molina, Spain	Giant Slalom	Patrizia Kummer (SUI)	Amelie Kober (GER)	Julie Zogg (SUI)	
17 March 2012	Valmalenco, Italy	Giant Slalom	Amelie Kober (GER)	Patrizia Kummer (SUI)	Julia Dujmovits (AUT)	

=== Snowboard Cross ===
Date	Place	Winner	Second	Third	Report
16 December 2011	Telluride, United States	Lindsey Jacobellis (USA)	Dominique Maltais (CAN)	Deborah Anthonioz (FRA)	
17 December 2011	Telluride, United States (Team)	France; Nelly Moenne Loccoz; Deborah Anthonioz	Canada; Dominique Maltais; Maelle Ricker	United States; Lindsey Jacobellis; Callan Chythlook-Sifsof	
15 January 2012	Bad Gastein, Austria	Cancelled due to lack of snow, rescheduled to 19 January in Veysonnaz			
19 January 2012	Veysonnaz, Switzerland	Lindsey Jacobellis (USA)	Aleksandra Zhekova (BUL)	Dominique Maltais (CAN)	
22 January 2012	Veysonnaz, Switzerland	Lindsey Jacobellis (USA)	Dominique Maltais (CAN)	Aleksandra Zhekova (BUL)	
8 February 2012	Blue Mountain, Canada	Dominique Maltais (CAN)	Aleksandra Zhekova (BUL)	Maëlle Ricker (CAN)	
21 February 2012	Stoneham, Canada	Maëlle Ricker (CAN)	Nelly Moenne Loccoz (FRA)	Déborah Anthonioz (FRA)	
14 March 2012	Valmalenco, Italy	Maëlle Ricker (CAN)	Aleksandra Zhekova (BUL)	Nelly Moenne Loccoz (FRA)	
16 March 2012	Valmalenco, Italy	Jacqueline Hernandez (USA)	Nelly Moenne Loccoz (FRA)	Zoe Gillings (GBR)	

=== Halfpipe ===
Date	Place	Winner	Second	Third	Report
28 August 2011	Cardrona, New Zealand	Cai Xuetong (CHN)	Holly Crawford (AUS)	Ursina Haller (SUI)	
3 November 2011	Saas-Fee, Switzerland	Queralt Castellet (ESP)	Sophie Rodriguez (FRA)	Ursina Haller (SUI)	
17 December 2011	Ruka, Finland	Lucile Lefevre (FRA)	Emma Bernard (FRA)	Ella Suitiala (FIN)	
23 February 2012	Stoneham, Canada	Cai Xuetong (CHN)	Li Shuang (CHN)	Haruna Matsumoto (JPN)	
~~2 March 2012~~	Bardonecchia, Italy	Cancelled for economical reasons			

=== Slopestyle ===
Date	Place	Winner	Second	Third	Report
~~4 February 2012~~	Jasná, Slovakia	Cancelled			
26 February 2012	Stoneham, Canada	Charlotte van Gils (NED)	Brooke Voigt (CAN)	Breanna Stangeland (CAN)	
~~4 March 2012~~	Bardonecchia, Italy	Cancelled for economical reasons			

== Standings ==
=== Overall Men ===
Pos	Athlete	Points
1.	Janne Korpi (FIN)	3990
2.	Dimi de Jong (NED)	2940
3.	Petja Piiroinen (FIN)	1520
4.	Nathan Johnstone (AUS)	1500
5.	Taku Hiraoka (JPN)	1295

=== Overall Women ===
Pos	Athlete	Points
1.	Cai Xuetong (CHN)	2000
2.	Queralt Castellet (ESP)	1580
3.	Emma Bernard (FRA)	1320
4.	Li Shuang (CHN)	1300
5.	Lucile Lefevre (FRA)	1290

=== Parallel Slalom Men ===
Pos	Athlete	Points
1.	Andreas Prommegger (AUT)	6950
2.	Roland Fischnaller (ITA)	6930
3.	Benjamin Karl (AUT)	5506
4.	Simon Schoch (SUI)	4686
5.	Siegfried Grabner (AUT)	3880

=== Parallel Slalom Women ===
Pos	Athlete	Points
1.	Patrizia Kummer (SUI)	6840
2.	Amelie Kober (GER)	6180
3.	Julia Dujmovits (AUT)	5400
4.	Marion Kreiner (AUT)	5310
5.	Yekaterina Tudegesheva (RUS)	5070

=== Snowboard Cross Men ===
Pos	Athlete	Points
1.	Pierre Vaultier (FRA)	3852
2.	Andrey Boldykov (RUS)	2930
3.	Nate Holland (USA)	2340
4.	Konstantin Schad (GER)	2306
5.	David Speiser (GER)	2250

=== Snowboard Cross Women ===
Pos	Athlete	Points
1.	Dominique Maltais (CAN)	4200
2.	Maëlle Ricker (CAN)	3950
3.	Aleksandra Zhekova (BUL)	3760
4.	Nelly Moenne Loccoz (FRA)	3460
5.	Lindsey Jacobellis (USA)	3000

=== Halfpipe Men ===
Pos	Athlete	Points
1.	Janne Korpi (FIN)	2200
2.	Nathan Johnstone (AUS)	1500
3.	Dimi de Jong (NED)	1360
4.	Taku Hiraoka (JPN)	1295
5.	Markus Malin (FIN)	1150

=== Halfpipe Women ===
Pos	Athlete	Points
1.	Cai Xuetong (CHN)	2000
2.	Queralt Castellet (ESP)	1580
3.	Emma Bernard (FRA)	1320
4.	Li Shuang (CHN)	1300
5.	Lucile Lefevre (FRA)	1290

=== Big Air Men ===
Pos	Athlete	Points
1.	Janne Korpi (FIN)	1520
2.	Petja Piiroinen (FIN)	1280
3.	Niklas Mattsson (SWE)	1160
4.	Antoine Truchon (CAN)	1078
5.	Alexey Soblev (RUS)	1050

== Medal table ==
Rank	Nation	Gold	Silver	Bronze	Total
1	Austria	7	10	11	28
2	Switzerland	7	6	7	20
3	France	6	4	5	15
4	Canada	5	6	5	16
5	United States	5	3	4	12
6	Italy	5	2	2	9
7	Germany	3	4	2	9
8	Finland	3	1	4	8
9	Russia	2	5	2	9
10	China	2	2	0	4
11	Netherlands	2	1	2	5
12	Australia	1	1	0	2
13	Norway	1	0	1	2
14	Spain	1	0	0	1
14	Sweden	1	0	0	1
16	Bulgaria	0	3	1	4
17	Japan	0	2	1	3
18	Belgium	0	1	0	1
19	Slovenia	0	0	2	2
20	Andorra	0	0	1	1
20	Great Britain	0	0	1	1
Totals (21 entries)		51	51	51	153
