= Snowboarding at the 2014 Winter Olympics – Men's snowboard cross =

Men's snowboard cross at the XXII Olympic Winter Games
- Venue: Rosa Khutor Extreme Park
- Date: 18 February 2014
- Competitors: 39 from 15 nations

Medalists
1st place, gold medalist(s)		Pierre Vaultier	France
2nd place, silver medalist(s)		Nikolay Olyunin	Russia
3rd place, bronze medalist(s)		Alex Deibold	United States

The men's snowboard cross competition of the Sochi 2014 Olympics was held at Rosa Khutor Extreme Park on 18 February 2014. The seeding run was cancelled due to fog and latest World Cup standings were used to seed the competitors. The finals were rescheduled to 08:30 on 18 February.

== Schedule ==
All times are (UTC+4).

Date	Time	Round
18 February	11:00	Seeding
18 February	13:30	1/8 finals
18 February	13:52	Quarterfinals
18 February	14:04	Semifinals
18 February	14:12	Finals

== Results ==
The event was held on 18 February.

=== Elimination round ===
==== 1/8 round ====
Due to the cancellation of the seeding rounds, World Cup standings were used to populate the elimination round heats. The top three finishers from each heat advance to the quarterfinals.

Heat 1

Rank	Bib	Name	Country	Notes
1	1	Alex Pullin	Australia	Q
2	33	Tony Ramoin	France	Q
3	17	Kevin Hill	Canada	Q
4	16	Nick Baumgartner	United States	
5	32	Andrey Boldykov	Russia	

Heat 2

Rank	Bib	Name	Country	Notes
1	8	Lucas Eguibar	Spain	Q
2	24	Regino Hernández	Spain	Q
3	9	Alex Deibold	United States	Q
4	25	Lluis Marin Tarroch	Andorra	DSQ

Heat 3

Rank	Bib	Name	Country	Notes
1	5	Trevor Jacob	United States	Q
2	28	Anton Lindfors	Finland	Q
3	21	Tommaso Leoni	Italy	Q
4	12	Nate Holland	United States	
5	37	Anton Koprivitsa	Russia	

Heat 4

Rank	Bib	Name	Country	Notes
1	20	Nikolay Olyunin	Russia	Q
2	4	Alessandro Hämmerle	Austria	Q
3	13	Stian Sivertzen	Norway	Q
4	29	Maciej Jodko	Poland	
5	36	Laro Herrero	Spain	

Heat 5

Rank	Bib	Name	Country	Notes
1	14	Konstantin Schad	Germany	Q
2	3	Omar Visintin	Italy	Q
3	35	Marvin James	Switzerland	Q
4	30	Jake Holden	Canada	
5	19	Emanuel Perathoner	Italy	DNS

Heat 6

Rank	Bib	Name	Country	Notes
1	6	Pierre Vaultier	France	Q
2	27	Hanno Douschan	Austria	Q
3	11	Jarryd Hughes	Australia	Q
4	38	Emil Novák	Czech Republic	
5	22	Jussi Taka	Finland	

Heat 7

Rank	Bib	Name	Country	Notes
1	23	Paul Berg	Germany	Q
2	7	Christopher Robanske	Canada	Q
3	26	Paul-Henri de Le Rue	France	Q
4	39	David Bakeš	Czech Republic	
5	10	Mateusz Ligocki	Poland	

Heat 8

Rank	Bib	Name	Country	Notes
1	31	Cameron Bolton	Australia	Q
2	34	Tim Watter	Switzerland	Q
3	15	Luca Matteotti	Italy	Q
4	2	Markus Schairer	Austria	
5	18	Robert Fagan	Canada	DSQ

==== Quarterfinals ====
From here, the athletes participated in six-person elimination races, with the top three from each race advancing.

Quarterfinal 1

Rank	Bib	Name	Country	Notes
1	8	Lucas Eguibar	Spain	Q
2	17	Kevin Hill	Canada	Q
3	9	Alex Deibold	United States	Q
4	1	Alex Pullin	Australia	
5	33	Tony Ramoin	France	
6	24	Regino Hernandez	Spain	DNF

Quarterfinal 2

Rank	Bib	Name	Country	Notes
1	20	Nikolay Olyunin	Russia	Q
2	5	Trevor Jacob	United States	Q
3	13	Stian Sivertzen	Norway	Q
4	28	Anton Lindfors	Finland	
5	4	Alessandro Hämmerle	Austria	
6	21	Tommaso Leoni	Italy	

Quarterfinal 3

Rank	Bib	Name	Country	Notes
1	6	Pierre Vaultier	France	Q
2	3	Omar Visintin	Italy	Q
3	27	Hanno Douschan	Austria	Q
4	14	Konstantin Schad	Germany	
5	11	Jarryd Hughes	Australia	
6	35	Marvin James	Switzerland	DNF

Quarterfinal 4

Rank	Bib	Name	Country	Notes
1	31	Cameron Bolton	Australia	Q
2	26	Paul-Henri de Le Rue	France	Q
3	15	Luca Matteotti	Italy	Q
4	23	Paul Berg	Germany	
5	7	Christopher Robanske	Canada	DSQ
6	34	Tim Watter	Switzerland	DSQ

==== Semifinals ====
Semifinal 1

Rank	Bib	Name	Country	Notes
1	20	Nikolay Olyunin	Russia	Q
2	13	Stian Sivertzen	Norway	Q
3	9	Alex Deibold	United States	Q
4	5	Trevor Jacob	United States	
5	8	Lucas Eguibar	Spain	DSQ
6	17	Kevin Hill	Canada	DNF

Semifinal 2

Rank	Bib	Name	Country	Notes
1	6	Pierre Vaultier	France	Q
2	26	Paul-Henri de Le Rue	France	Q
3	15	Luca Matteotti	Italy	Q
4	31	Cameron Bolton	Australia	
5	27	Hanno Douschan	Austria	DSQ
6	3	Omar Visintin	Italy	DNF

==== Finals ====
Small Final

Rank	Bib	Name	Country	Notes
7	8	Lucas Eguibar	Spain	
8	17	Kevin Hill	Canada	
9	5	Trevor Jacob	United States	
10	27	Hanno Douschan	Austria	
11	31	Cameron Bolton	Australia	DNF
12	3	Omar Visintin	Italy	DNS

Large Final

Rank	Bib	Name	Country	Notes
1st place, gold medalist(s)	6	Pierre Vaultier	France	
2nd place, silver medalist(s)	20	Nikolay Olyunin	Russia	
3rd place, bronze medalist(s)	9	Alex Deibold	United States	
4	26	Paul-Henri de Le Rue	France	
5	13	Stian Sivertzen	Norway	
6	15	Luca Matteotti	Italy	
