= Italy at the 2010 Winter Olympics =

- IOC code: ITA
- NOC: Italian National Olympic Committee
- Website: www.coni.it (in Italian)

in Vancouver
- Competitors: 114 in 13 sports
- Flag bearer: Giorgio Di Centa
- Medals Ranked 16th: Gold 1 Silver 1 Bronze 3 Total 5

Winter Olympics appearances (overview)
- 1924; 1928; 1932; 1936; 1948; 1952; 1956; 1960; 1964; 1968; 1972; 1976; 1980; 1984; 1988; 1992; 1994; 1998; 2002; 2006; 2010; 2014; 2018; 2022; 2026

Italy participated at the 2010 Winter Olympics in Vancouver, British Columbia, Canada.

== Medalists ==
| Medal | Name | Sport | Event | Date |
|---|---|---|---|---|
| Gold | Giuliano Razzoli | Alpine skiing | Men's slalom | 27 |
| Silver | Pietro Piller Cottrer | Cross-country skiing | Men's 15 km freestyle | 15 |
| Bronze | Alessandro Pittin | Nordic combined | Individual normal hill/10 km | 14 |
| Bronze | Armin Zoeggler | Luge | Men's singles | 14 |
| Bronze | Arianna Fontana | Short track speed skating | Women's 500 m | 18 |

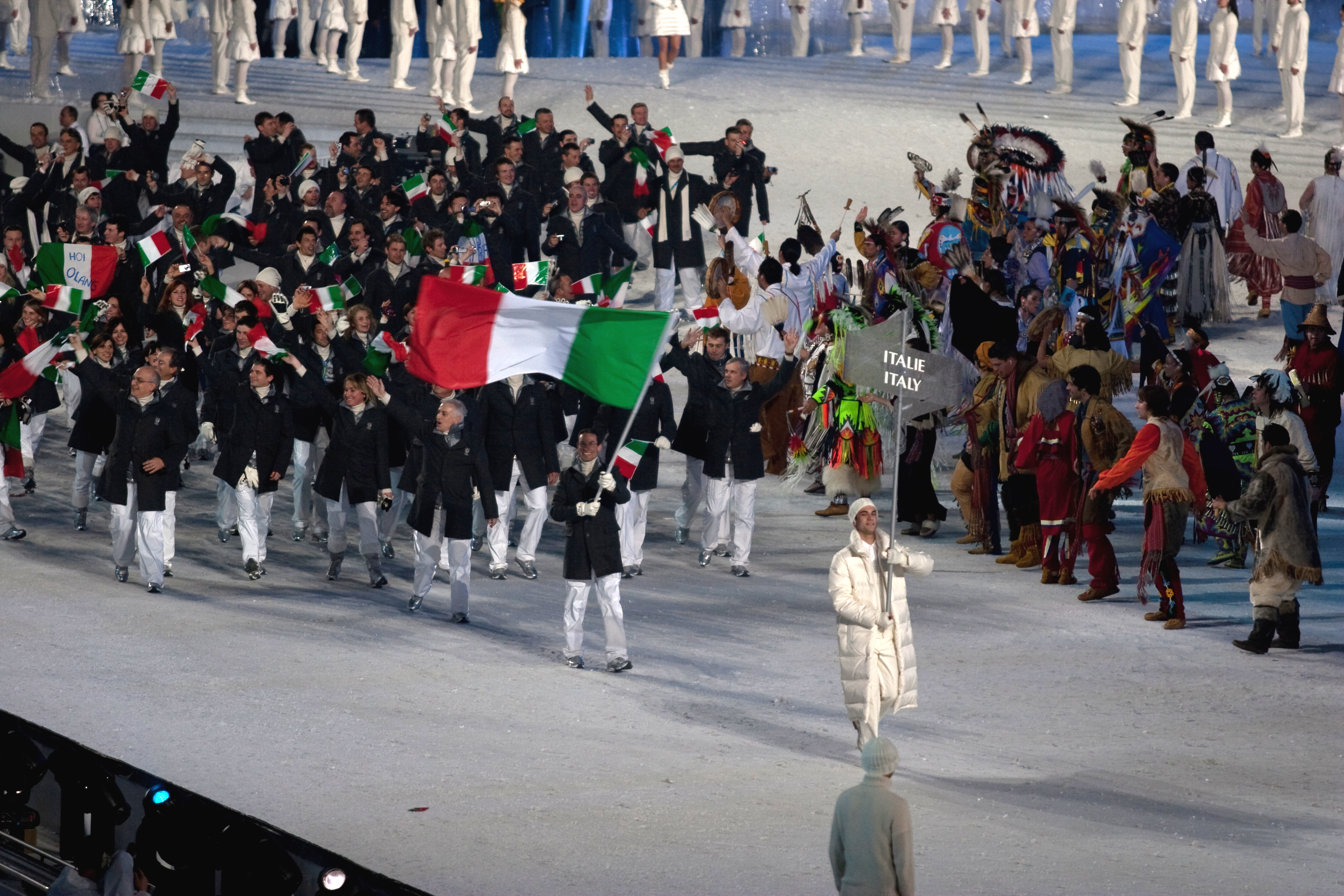
The athletes entering the stadium during the opening ceremonies.

== Alpine skiing ==
Men

| Athlete | Event | Final | | | |
| Athlete | Event | Run 1 | Run 2 | Total | Rank |
|---|---|---|---|---|---|
| Christian Deville | Slalom | did not finish | | | |
| Peter Fill | Downhill | n/a | | 1:55.29 | 15 |
| Peter Fill | Super-G | n/a | | Disqualified | |
| Peter Fill | Combined | 1:54.15 | did not finish | | |
| Werner Heel | Downhill | n/a | | 1:55.19 | 12 |
| Werner Heel | Super-G | n/a | | 1:30.67 | 4 |
| Christof Innerhofer | Downhill | n/a | | 1:55.58 | 19 |
| Christof Innerhofer | Super-G | n/a | | 1:30.73 | 6 |
| Christof Innerhofer | Combined | 1:54.55 | 51.90 | 2:46.45 | 8 |
| Manfred Mölgg | Giant slalom | 1:18.94 | 1:21.57 | 2:40.51 | 22 |
| Manfred Mölgg | Slalom | 48.64 | 51.81 | 1:40.45 | 7 |
| Manfred Mölgg | Combined | 1:58.29 | did not finish | | |
| Patrick Staudacher | Combined | 1:53.54 | 54.45 | 2:47.99 | 13 |
| Alexander Ploner | Giant slalom | 1:18.67 | 1:21.10 | 2:39.77 | 18 |
| Giuliano Razzoli | Slalom | 47.79 | 51.53 | 1:39.32 | 1st place, gold medalist(s) |
| Davide Simoncelli | Giant slalom | 1:18.52 | 1:21.44 | 2:39.96 | 20 |
| Patrick Staudacher | Downhill | n/a | | 1:57.21 | 35 |
| Patrick Staudacher | Super-G | n/a | | 1:30.74 | 7 |
| Patrick Thaler | Slalom | 50.13 | did not finish | | |

Women

| Athlete | Event | Final | | | |
| Athlete | Event | Run 1 | Run 2 | Total | Rank |
|---|---|---|---|---|---|
| Federica Brignone | Giant slalom | 1:17.01 | 1:11.67 | 2:28.68 | 18 |
| Chiara Costazza | Slalom | 53.18 | did not finish | | 18 |
| Elena Fanchini | Downhill | n/a | | did not finish | |
| Elena Fanchini | Super-G | n/a | | 1:22.17 | 14 |
| Nicole Gius | Giant slalom | 1:17.16 | 1:11.71 | 2:28.87 | 20 |
| Nicole Gius | Slalom | 51.71 | 53.30 | 1:45.01 | 8 |
| Denise Karbon | Giant slalom | 1:18.22 | 1:11.15 | 2:29.37 | 23 |
| Denise Karbon | Slalom | 53.44 | 52.50 | 1:45.94 | 18 |
| Daniela Merighetti | Downhill | n/a | | did not finish | |
| Daniela Merighetti | Super-G | n/a | | did not finish | |
| Daniela Merighetti | Combined | did not finish | | | |
| Manuela Mölgg | Giant slalom | 1:15.79 | 1:12.87 | 2:28.66 | 17 |
| Manuela Mölgg | Slalom | 53.09 | 52.22 | 1:45.31 | 11 |
| Lucia Recchia | Downhill | n/a | | 1:46.50 | 9 |
| Lucia Recchia | Super-G | n/a | | 1:21.43 | 7 |
| Johanna Schnarf | Downhill | n/a | | 1:48.77 | 22 |
| Johanna Schnarf | Super-G | n/a | | 1:20.99 | 4 |
| Johanna Schnarf | Combined | 1:25.72 | 45.57 | 2:11.29 | 8 |

== Biathlon ==
Men

| Athlete | Event | Final | | |
| Athlete | Event | Time | Misses | Rank |
|---|---|---|---|---|
| Mattia Cola | Sprint | 27:24.9 | 0+1 | 60 |
| Mattia Cola | Pursuit | 39:50.9 | 0+0+0+4 | 55 |
| Christian de Lorenzi | Sprint | 27:25.9 | 2+2 | 61 |
| Christian de Lorenzi | Individual | 53:03.6 | 1+0+2+1 | 38 |
| Lukas Hofer | Sprint | 27:18.3 | 2+2 | 56 |
| Lukas Hofer | Pursuit | 39:50.9 | 2+0+2+1 | 54 |
| Lukas Hofer | Individual | 53:23.7 | 0+1+1+1 | 46 |
| Markus Windisch | Sprint | 26:44.7 | 0+0 | 44 |
| Markus Windisch | Pursuit | 39:50.8 | 0+2+3+1 | 53 |
| Markus Windisch | Individual | 52:38.7 | 0+3+0+0 | 31 |
| Rene Laurent Vuillermoz | Individual | 54:19.7 | 0+1+1+2 | 54 |
| Christian de Lorenzi; Markus Windisch; Lukas Hofer; Mattia Cola | Relay | 1:26:27.5 | 2+22 | 11 |

Women

| Athlete | Event | Final | | |
| Athlete | Event | Time | Misses | Rank |
|---|---|---|---|---|
| Roberta Fiandino | Sprint | 23:11.6 | 3+1 | 73 |
| Katja Haller | Sprint | 21:51.0 | 0+1 | 38 |
| Katja Haller | Pursuit | 36:20.9 | 1+2+2+0 | 51 |
| Katja Haller | Individual | 43:12.4 | 0+0+0+0 | 18 |
| Karin Oberhofer | Sprint | 22:08.9 | 1+2 | 47 |
| Karin Oberhofer | Pursuit | 36:40.3 | 2+3+1+0 | 53 |
| Karin Oberhofer | Individual | 49:18.6 | 0+1+2+4 | 75 |
| Michela Ponza | Sprint | 21:55.7 | 1+1 | 43 |
| Michela Ponza | Pursuit | 36:11.9 | 0+1+0+0 | 50 |
| Michela Ponza | Individual | 43:54.4 | 0+0+0+1 | 27 |
| Christa Perathoner | Individual | 50:23.3 | 1+1+1+2 | 79 |
| Michela Ponza; Katja Haller; Karin Oberhofer; Roberta Fiandino | Relay | 1:12:54.2 | 0+16 | 11 |

== Bobsleigh ==
| Athlete | Event | Run 1 | | Run 2 | | Run 3 | | Run 4 | | Total | |
| Athlete | Event | Time | Rank | Time | Rank | Time | Rank | Time | Rank | Time | Rank |
|---|---|---|---|---|---|---|---|---|---|---|---|
| Fabrizio Tosini; Sergio Riva | Two-man | 52.84 | 19 | 52.83 | 19 | 52.34 | 16 | 52.65 | 17 | 3:30.66 | 17 |
| Simone Bertazzo; Samuele Romanini | Two-man | 52.33 | 13 | 52.88 | 14 | DSQ | | | | | |
| Jessica Gillarduzzi; Laura Curione | Two-woman | 54.15 | 12 | 54.37 | 14 | 54.40 | 14 | 54.11 | 13 | 3:37.03 | 13 |
| Simone Bertazzo; Danilo Santarsiero; Samuele Romanini; Mirko Turri | Four-man | 51.57 | 13 | 51.38 | 10 | 51.62 | 10 | 51.68 | 9 | 3:26.25 | 9 |

== Cross-country skiing ==
Men

| Athlete | Event | Qualification | | Quarterfinals | | Semifinals | | Final | |
| Athlete | Event | Time | Rank | Time | Rank | Time | Rank | Time | Rank |
|---|---|---|---|---|---|---|---|---|---|
| Giorgio Di Centa | 15 km freestyle | | | | | | | 34:36.2 | 10 |
| Giorgio Di Centa | 30 km pursuit | | | | | | | 1:16:05.1 | 12 |
| Giorgio Di Centa | 50 km classic | | | | | | | 2:05:49.0 | 11 |
| Valerio Checchi | 15 km freestyle | | | | | | | 34:53.7 | 19 |
| Valerio Checchi | 50 km classic | | | | | | | 2:10:49.7 | 31 |
| Roland Clara | 50 km classic | | | | | | | 2:11:00.8 | 36 |
| Pietro Piller Cottrer | 15 km freestyle | | | | | | | 34:00.9 | 2nd place, silver medalist(s) |
| Pietro Piller Cottrer | 30 km pursuit | | | | | | | 1:16:19.9 | 14 |
| Pietro Piller Cottrer | 50 km classic | | | | | | | 2:08:21.6 | 26 |
| Loris Frasnelli | Sprint | 3:41.78 | 30 Q | 3:40.9 | 6 | did not qualify | | | 27 |
| David Hofer | 30 km pursuit | | | | | | | 1:25:02.6 | 53 |
| David Hofer | Sprint | 3:42.89 | 39 | did not qualify | | | | | 39 |
| Thomas Moriggl | 15 km freestyle | | | | | | | 34:59.9 | 24 |
| Thomas Moriggl | 30 km pursuit | | | | | | | 1:17:40.9 | 24 |
| Fabio Pasini | Sprint | 3:40.86 | 26 Q | 3:35.7 | 5 | did not qualify | | | 22 |
| Renato Pasini | Sprint | 3:39.63 | 22 Q | 3:42.8 | 4 | did not qualify | | | 20 |
| Renato Pasini, Cristian Zorzi | Team sprint | | | | | 18:43.9 | 4 Q | 19:21.1 | 8 |
| Valerio Checchi, Giorgio Di Centa, Pietro Piller Cottrer, Cristian Zorzi | 4 x 10 km relay | | | | | | | 1:47:16.6 | 9 |

Women

| Athlete | Event | Qualification | | Quarterfinals | | Semifinals | | Final | |
| Athlete | Event | Time | Rank | Time | Rank | Time | Rank | Time | Rank |
|---|---|---|---|---|---|---|---|---|---|
| Elisa Brocard | Sprint | 3:58.27 | 43 | did not qualify | | | | | 43 |
| Antonella Confortola | 30 km classic | | | | | | | 1:34:07.7 | 16 |
| Arianna Follis | 10 km freestyle | | | | | | | 25:54.1 | 11 |
| Arianna Follis | 15 km pursuit | | | | | | | 41:21.6 | 9 |
| Magda Genuin | Sprint | 3:42.18 | 4 Q | 3:41.9 | 1 Q | 3:42.2 | 2 Q | 3:49.1 | 5 |
| Marianna Longa | 10 km freestyle | | | | | | | 26:06.2 | 18 |
| Marianna Longa | 15 km pursuit | | | | | | | 41:02.2 | 7 |
| Marianna Longa | 30 km classic | | | | | | | 1:33:19.9 | 11 |
| Karin Moroder | Sprint | 3:53.74 | 39 | did not qualify | | | | | 39 |
| Silvia Rupil | 10 km freestyle | | | | | | | 25:58.5 | 14 |
| Silvia Rupil | 15 km pursuit | | | | | | | 42:01.6 | 16 |
| Sabina Valbusa | 10 km freestyle | | | | | | | 26:05.8 | 17 |
| Sabina Valbusa | 15 km pursuit | | | | | | | 42:19.4 | 18 |
| Sabina Valbusa | 30 km classic | | | | | | | DNS | |
| Magda Genuin, Arianna Follis | Team sprint | | | | | 18:43.0 | 2 Q | 18:14.2 | 4 |
| Arianna Follis, Marianna Longa, Silvia Rupil, Sabina Valbusa | 4 x 5 km relay | | | | | | | 56:04.9 | 4 |

== Figure skating ==
Italy has qualified 2 entrants in men's singles, 1 in ladies singles, 1 in pair skating, and 2 in ice dancing, for a total of 9 athletes.

| Athlete(s) | Event | CD | | SP/OD | | FS/FD | | Total | |
| Athlete(s) | Event | Points | Rank | Points | Rank | Points | Rank | Points | Rank |
|---|---|---|---|---|---|---|---|---|---|
| Samuel Contesti | Men's | | | 70.60 | 14 | 116.90 | 19 | 187.50 | 18 |
| Paolo Bacchini | Men's | | | 64.42 | 20 | 112.79 | 22 | 177.21 | 20 |
| Carolina Kostner | Ladies' | | | 63.02 | 7 | 88.88 | 19 | 151.90 | 16 |
| Nicole Della Monica, Yannick Kocon | Pairs | | | 56.82 | 11 | 104.78 | 13 | 161.60 | 12 |
| Federica Faiella, Massimo Scali | Ice dancing | 39.88 | 5 | 60.18 | 5 | 99.11 | 5 | 199.17 | 5 |
| Anna Cappellini, Luca La Notte | Ice dancing | 33.13 | 12 | 51.45 | 12 | 82.74 | 15 | 167.32 | 12 |

== Freestyle skiing ==
Moguls

| Athlete | Event | Qualifying | | Final | |
| Athlete | Event | Points | Rank | Points | Rank |
|---|---|---|---|---|---|
| Deborah Scanzio | Women's moguls | 21.84 | 14 Q | 22.19 | 10 |

== Luge ==
| Athlete | Event | Run 1 | Run 2 | Run 3 | Run 4 | Total | Rank |
|---|---|---|---|---|---|---|---|
| David Mair | Men's singles | 48.978 | 48.989 | 49.376 | 48.845 | 3:16.199 | 17 |
| Reinhold Rainer | Men's singles | 48.846 | 49.065 | 49.416 | 48.007 | 3:16.334 | 21 |
| Armin Zöggeler | Men's singles | 48.473 | 48.529 | 48.914 | 48.459 | 3:14.375 | 3rd place, bronze medalist(s) |
| Sandra Gasparini | Women's singles | 42.339 | 42.161 | 42.881 | 42.621 | 2:50.002 | 20 |
| Oswald Haselrieder; Gerhard Plankensteiner | Doubles | 41.789 | 41.860 | | | 1:23.649 | 9 |
| Christian Oberstolz; Patrick Gruber | Doubles | 41.527 | 41.585 | | | 1:23.112 | 4 |

== Nordic combined ==
| Athlete | Event | Jump distance | Jump score | Rank | Cross country time | Total | Rank |
|---|---|---|---|---|---|---|---|
| Armin Bauer | Individual normal hill/10 km | 86.5 | 91.5 | 44 | 26:36.3 | 29:32.3 | 43 |
| Armin Bauer | Individual large hill/10 km | 117.5 | 99.8 | 23 | 26:00.1 | 28:16.3 | 21 |
| Giuseppe Michielli | Individual normal hill/10 km | 93.0 | 107.0 | 38 | 25:46.1 | 26:30.1 | 33 |
| Giuseppe Michielli | Individual large hill/10 km | 114.0 | 94.0 | 27 | 25:38.3 | 27:55.7 | 23 |
| Alessandro Pittin | Individual normal hill/10 km | 100.0 | 123.5 | 6 | 24:59.9 | 25:47.9 | 3rd place, bronze medalist(s) |
| Alessandro Pittin | Individual large hill/10 km | 122.5 | 108.7 | 13 | 25:00.6 | 25:41.3 | 7 |
| Lukas Runggaldier | Individual normal hill/10 km | 98.5 | 119.0 | 16 | 25:30.7 | 26:36.7 | 16 |
| Lukas Runggaldier | Individual large hill/10 km | 98.5 | 119.0 | 16 | 25:40.6 | 26:37.9 | 11 |

Team large hill/4 x 5 km

| Athletes | Group 1 | | Group 2 | | Group 3 | | Group 4 | | Total | Rank | Cross-country time | Total | Rank |
| Athletes | Dist. | Pts. | Dist. | Pts. | Dist. | Pts. | Dist. | Pts. | Total | Rank | Cross-country time | Total | Rank |
|---|---|---|---|---|---|---|---|---|---|---|---|---|---|
| Lukas Runggaldier; Armin Bauer; Giuseppe Michielli; Alessandro Pittin | 126.5 | 113.7 | 114.0 | 92.0 | 112.5 | 89.7 | 122.5 | 107.2 | 402.6 | 10 | 51:55.5 | 53:55.5 | 10 |

== Short track speed skating ==
Italy's team consisted of ten athletes. Roberto Serra was scheduled to compete in the men's 5000 relay event and did not do so.

Men

| Athlete | Event | Heat | | Quarterfinal | | Semifinal | | Final | |
| Athlete | Event | Time | Rank | Time | Rank | Time | Rank | Time | Rank |
|---|---|---|---|---|---|---|---|---|---|
| Nicolas Bean | 500 m | 42.344, | 3 | did not advance | | | | | 20 |
| Nicolas Bean | 1000 m | 1:26.781 | 2 Q | 1:25.827 | 3 | did not advance | | | 11 |
| Nicolas Bean | 1500 m | 2:17.089 | 4 | | | did not advance | | | 31 |
| Yuri Confortola | 500 m | 1:17.401 | 4 | did not advance | | | | | 30 |
| Yuri Confortola | 1000 m | 1:27.073 | 1 Q | 1:24.788 | 3 | did not advance | | | 9 |
| Yuri Confortola | 1500 m | 2:14.584 | 1 Q | | | 2:13.645 | 3 q | Final B DSQ | |
| Nicola Rodigari | 500 m | 42.190 | 3 | did not advance | | | | | 18 |
| Nicola Rodigari | 1000 m | 1:41.117 | 3 ADV | DSQ | | | did not advance | | |
| Nicola Rodigari | 1500 m | 2:12.609 | 3 Q | | | 2:11.402 | 4 q | Final B 2:18.422 | 8 |
| Nicolas Bean; Yuri Confortola; Claudio Rinaldi; Nicola Rodigari | 5000 m relay | | | | | DSQ | | | |

Women

| Athlete | Event | Heat | | Quarterfinal | | Semifinal | | Final | |
| Athlete | Event | Time | Rank | Time | Rank | Time | Rank | Time | Rank |
|---|---|---|---|---|---|---|---|---|---|
| Arianna Fontana | 500 m | 44.482 | 1 Q | 44.257 | 2 Q | 43.991 | 2 Q | 43.804 | Bronze medal |
| Arianna Fontana | 1000 m | 1:32.640 | 2 Q | 1:32.472 | 3 | did not advance | | | 14 |
| Arianna Fontana | 1500 m | 2:27.120 | 1 Q | | | 2:21.522 | 3 q | Final B 2:42.801 | 9 |
| Cecilia Maffei | 500 m | 44.948 | 3 | did not advance | | | | | 22 |
| Cecilia Maffei | 1000 m | 1:32.615 | 3 | did not advance | | | | | 22 |
| Cecilia Maffei | 1500 m | 2:24.931 | 5 | | | did not advance | | | 23 |
| Martina Valcepina | 500 m | 1:08.173 | 4 | did not advance | | | | | 31 |
| Katia Zini | 1500 m | 2:30.606 | 6 | | | did not advance | | | 28 |
| Arianna Fontana; Cecilia Maffei; Martina Valcepina; Katia Zini; Lucia Peretti* | 3000 m relay | | | | | 4:23.950 | 4 QB | 4:18.559 | 6 |

* Competed in final only.

== Skeleton ==
| Athlete(s) | Event | Run 1 | Run 2 | Run 3 | Run 4 | Total | Rank |
|---|---|---|---|---|---|---|---|
| Nicola Drocco | Men's | 55.77 | 54.60 | 54.97 | did not advance | 2:45.34 | 26 |
| Costanza Zanoletti | Women's | 55.48 | 55.63 | 55.38 | 55.31 | 3:41.80 | 15 |

== Ski jumping ==
Men

| Athlete | Event | Qualifying | | First round | | Final | | |
| Athlete | Event | Points | Rank | Points | Rank | Points | Total | Rank |
|---|---|---|---|---|---|---|---|---|
| Sebastian Colloredo | Normal hill | 113.0 | 35 Q | 114.0 | 28 Q | 115.0 | 26 | 29 |
| Sebastian Colloredo | Large hill | 125.2 | 18 Q | 99.3 | 27 | 102.9 | 24 | 27 |
| Roberto Dellasega | Normal hill | 87.8 | 44 | did not advance | | | | |
| Roberto Dellasega | Large hill | DSQ | | | | | | |
| Andrea Morassi | Normal hill | 109.7 | 31 Q | 59.9 | 48 | did not advance | | 48 |
| Andrea Morassi | Large hill | 114.0 | 32 Q | 106.0 | 43 | did not advance | | 43 |

== Snowboarding ==
Halfpipe

| Athlete | Event | Qualifying | | | Semifinal | | | Final | | |
| Athlete | Event | Run 1 | Run 2 | Rank | Run 1 | Run 2 | Rank | Run 1 | Run 2 | Rank |
|---|---|---|---|---|---|---|---|---|---|---|
| Manuel Pietropoli | Men's halfpipe | 9.3 | 5.2 | 20 | did not advance | | | | | 39 |

Parallel GS

| Athlete | Event | Qualification | | Round of 16 | Quarterfinals | Semifinals | Finals | |
| Athlete | Event | Time | Rank | Opposition time | Opposition time | Opposition time | Opposition time | Rank |
|---|---|---|---|---|---|---|---|---|
| Meinhard Erlacher | Men's parallel giant slalom | 1:18.87 | 18 | did not advance | | | | 18 |
| Roland Fischnaller | Men's parallel giant slalom | 1:20.14 | 21 | did not advance | | | | 21 |
| Aaron March | Men's parallel giant slalom | 1:18.36 | 13 Q | Benjamin Karl (AUT) (4); L +2.27 | did not advance | | | 13 |
| Corinna Boccacini | Women's parallel giant slalom | 1:28.88 | 26 | did not advance | | | | 26 |
| Carmen Ranigler | Women's parallel giant slalom | 1:26.93 | 25 | did not advance | | | | 25 |

Snowboard cross

| Athlete | Event | Qualifying | | 1/8 finals | Quarterfinals | Semifinals | Finals | |
| Athlete | Event | Time | Rank | Position | Position | Position | Position | Rank |
|---|---|---|---|---|---|---|---|---|
| Simone Malusa | Men's snowboard cross | 1:24.53 | 30 Q | 3 | did not advance | | | T17 |
| Stefano Pozzolini | Men's snowboard cross | 1:23.08 | 18 Q | 2 Q | 3 Q | did not advance | | T9 |
| Federico Raimo | Men's snowboard cross | 1:23.16 | 19 Q | 4 | did not advance | | | T25 |
| Alberto Schiavon | Men's snowboard cross | 1:22.33 | 13 Q | 3 | did not advance | | | T17 |
| Raffaella Brutto | Women's snowboard cross | 1:34.12 | 17 | | did not advance | | | 17 |

== Speed skating ==
Men

| Athlete | Event | Race 1 | | Race 2 | | Final | |
| Athlete | Event | Time | Rank | Time | Rank | Time | Rank |
|---|---|---|---|---|---|---|---|
| Ermanno Ioriatti | 500 m | 35.957 | 29 | 35.842 | 24 | 71.79 | 24 |
| Ermanno Ioriatti | 1000 m | | | | | 1:12.15 | 33 |
| Matteo Anesi | 1000 m | | | | | 1:11.51 | 30 |
| Matteo Anesi | 1500 m | | | | | 1:47.34 | 12 |
| Enrico Fabris | 1500 m | | | | | 1:47.02 | 10 |
| Enrico Fabris | 5000 m | | | | | 6:20.53 | 7 |
| Enrico Fabris | 10000 m | | | | | DNS | |

Women

| Athlete | Event | Race 1 | | Race 2 | | Final | |
| Athlete | Event | Time | Rank | Time | Rank | Time | Rank |
|---|---|---|---|---|---|---|---|
| Chiara Simionato | 500 m | 39.480 | 28 | 39.285 | 25 | 78.76 | 25 |
| Chiara Simionato | 1000 m | | | | | 1:18.02 | 19 |
| Chiara Simionato | 1000 m | | | | | 2:02.38 | 27 |

Team pursuit

| Athlete | Event | Quarterfinal | Semifinal | Final | |
| Athlete | Event | Opposition time | Opposition time | Opposition time | Rank |
|---|---|---|---|---|---|
| Matteo Anesi, Enrico Fabris, Luca Stefani | Men's team pursuit | Canada; L +3.97 | did not advance | Final C South Korea; L +5.79 | 6 |

== See also ==
- Italy at the 2010 Winter Paralympics
