= Andrew Fischer (disambiguation) =

Andrew Fischer (born 2004) is an American baseball player.

Andrew or Andy Fischer may also refer to:

- Andrew Andika Fischer (born 1987), Indonesian actor
- Andrew Fischer, founder of Nurv
- Andrew Fischer (singer) in X Factor (Germany season 3)
- Andy Fischer (snowboarder), competed in FIS Snowboarding World Championships 2013 – Men's snowboard cross

== See also ==
- Andrew Fisher (disambiguation)
- Andy Fischer-Price, actor in Kaboom (film)
