= Andrew Fisher (disambiguation) =

Andrew Fisher (1862–1928) was an Australian politician.

Andrew Fisher or Andy Fisher may also refer to:

- Andrew Fisher (MP), MP for Aldborough (UK Parliament constituency) 1593–1597
- Andrew Fisher (political activist) (born 1979), former policy advisor to Jeremy Corbyn
- Andrew Fisher (physicist), professor of physics
- Andrew Fisher (Scrabble), Scrabble player
- Andrew Fisher (Shazam), executive chairman of Shazam
- Andrew Fisher (sprinter) (born 1991), Jamaican-born Bahraini athlete
- Andy Fisher (rugby league) (born 1967), rugby league footballer and coach
- Andy Fisher (footballer) (born 1998), British footballer

== See also ==
- Andrew Fischer (disambiguation)
