= Robert Fagan (snowboarder) =

Canadian snowboarder

Personal information
- Born: 29 July 1976 (age 49) Cranbrook, British Columbia, Canada
- Height: 185 cm (6 ft 1 in)
- Weight: 88 kg (194 lb)

Sport
- Country: Canada (men's snowboard cross); US (Olympic coaching)
- Sport: Snowboarding

Robert "Rob" Fagan (born 29 July 1976 in Cranbrook, Canada) was a Canadian snowboarder and is currently the head coach for the US Olympic snowboarding team.

He is most known for competing at the 2010 Winter Olympics in Vancouver in the men's snowboard cross competition on 15 February 2010 where he finished in fifth place.

He left the Canadian Olympic snowboard cross team in 2019 and joined the coaching staff of the US Olympic snowboarding team that same year, eventually becoming the head coach of the team in 2022.

== See also ==
- Mike Robertson (snowboarder)
