= David Bakeš =

Czech snowboarder (born 1982)

Personal information
- Born: 2 August 1982 (age 43) Prague, Czechoslovakia

Sport
- Sport: Skiing

David Bakeš (born 2 August 1982, in Prague) is a Czech snowboarder, specializing in snowboard cross.

Bakeš competed at the 2010 and 2014 Winter Olympics for the Czech Republic. In the 2010 snowboard cross, he qualified 32nd, failing to advance, and ending up 32nd overall. In the 2014 snowboard cross, he finished 4th in his 1/8 round race, failing to advance, and ending up 25th overall.

As of September 2014, his best showing at the World Championships is 29th, in the 2011 snowboard cross.

Bakeš made his World Cup debut in February 2007. As of September 2014, his best finish is 4th, at Telluride in 2009–10. His best overall finish is 20th, in 2007–08.
