= Nate Holland =

American snowboarder (born 1978)

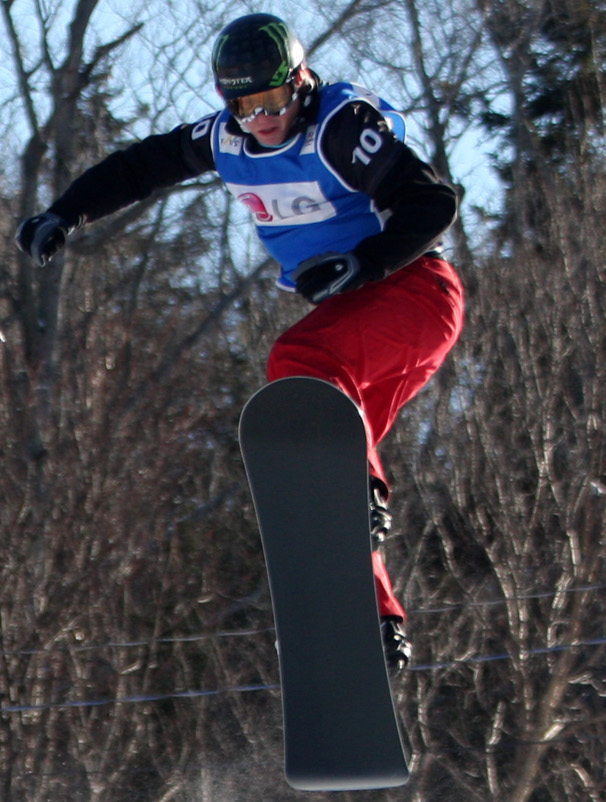
- Holland in 2010

Personal information
- Born: November 8, 1978 (age 47) Sandpoint, Idaho, U.S.
- Height: 5 ft 10 in (178 cm)

Sport
- Sport: Snowboarding
- Event: Snowboard cross
Medal record
Men's snowboarding
Representing the United States
World Championships
Bronze medal – third place	2007 Arosa	Snowboard cross
Bronze medal – third place	2011 La Molina	Snowboard cross
Winter X Games
Gold medal – first place	2006 Aspen	Snowboard cross
Gold medal – first place	2007 Aspen	Snowboard cross
Gold medal – first place	2008 Aspen	Snowboard cross
Gold medal – first place	2009 Aspen	Snowboard cross
Gold medal – first place	2010 Aspen	Snowboard cross
Gold medal – first place	2012 Aspen	Snowboard cross
Gold medal – first place	2014 Aspen	Snowboard cross
Bronze medal – third place	2011 Aspen	Snowboard cross
Bronze medal – third place	2015 Aspen	Snowboard cross

Nate Holland (born November 8, 1978, in Sandpoint, Idaho) is an American snowboarder. He competed for the United States at the 2006 Winter Olympics in Turin, where he finished fourteenth; at the 2010 Winter Olympics in Vancouver, where he finished fourth; and at the 2014 Winter Olympics in Sochi, where he was eliminated in the quarterfinals.

Holland won a gold medal in Snowboard Cross at the 2007 Winter X Games XI in Aspen, Colorado. He won another gold medal at the 2008 Winter X Games XII, beating Markus Schairer in the finals. Holland has won seven gold medals in the X-games, five of which were back to back, creating a new world record for the most consecutive medals won in Boarder-X.

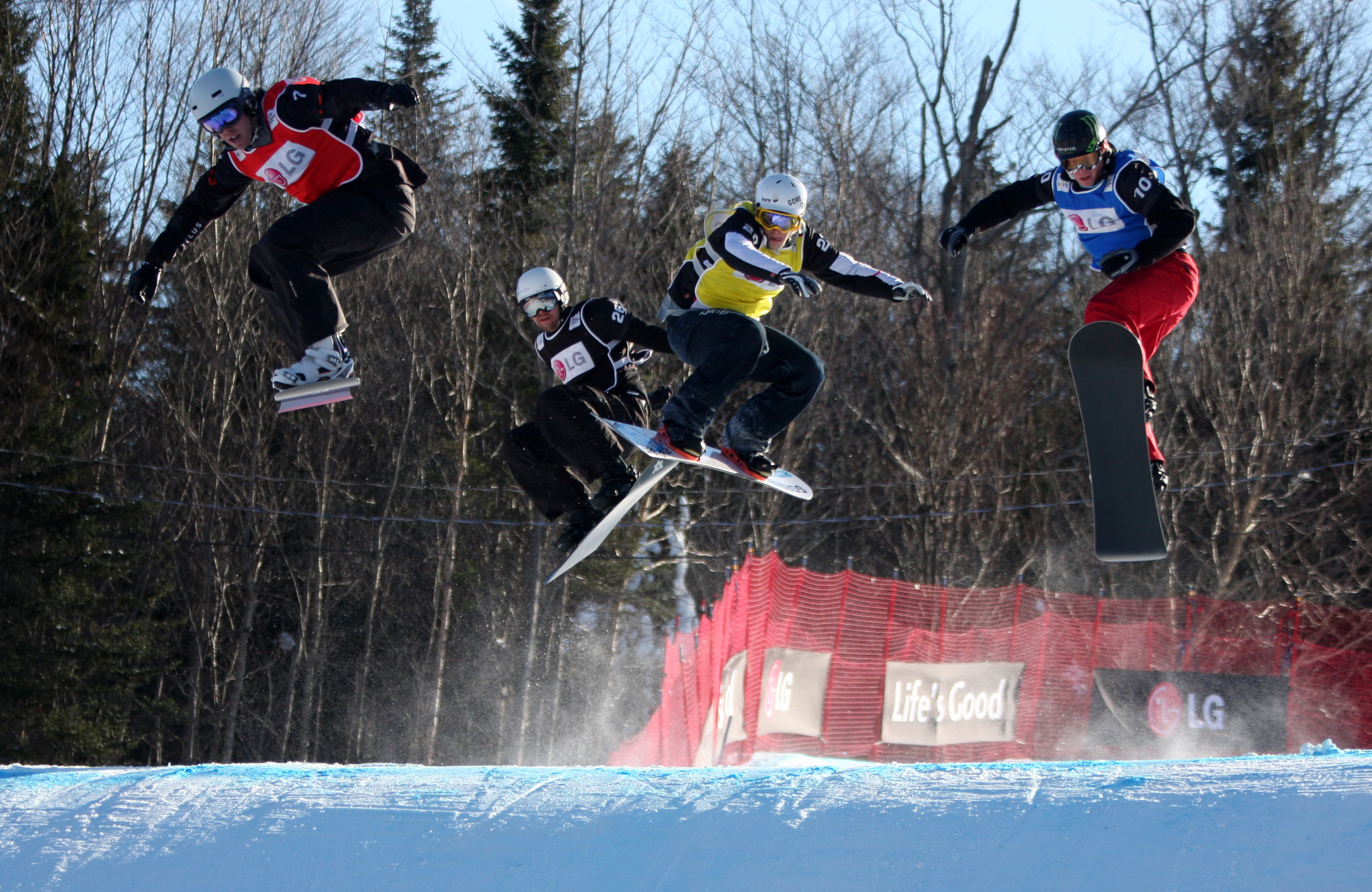
Mike Robertson, Jake Holden, Konstantin Schad, Nate Holland. Stoneham, 2010

== Personal life ==
Holland married his wife, Christen, in June 2012. They live in the North Tahoe area, in Truckee, California. Nate is the middle child of three brothers. His younger brother, Pat Holland, also competes in Boarder-X competitions.
