= Fabio Caduff =

Swiss snowboarder

Personal information
- Nationality: Swiss
- Born: September 12, 1985 (age 40)

Sport
- Sport: Snowboarding

Fabio Caduff (born 12 September 1985 in Cumbel) is a Swiss snowboarder. He placed 13th in the men's snowboard cross event at the 2010 Winter Olympics.
