= Alex Pullin =

Australian snowboarder (1987–2020)

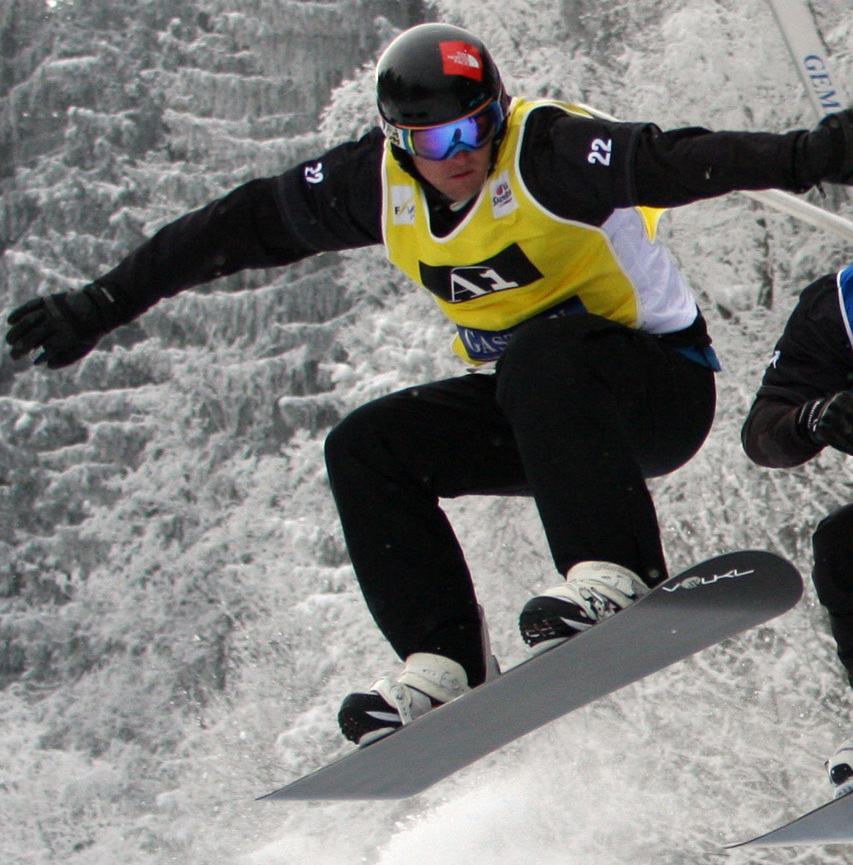
- Pullin in 2010

Personal information
- Nickname: Chumpy
- Born: 20 September 1987 Mansfield, Victoria, Australia
- Died: 8 July 2020 (aged 32) Gold Coast, Queensland, Australia
- Height: 185 cm (6 ft 1 in) (2014)
- Weight: 87 kg (192 lb) (2014)
- Life partner: Ellidy Pullin
- Children: 1 Minnie Pullin

Sport
- Country: Australia
- Sport: Snowboarding
- Event: Snowboard Cross Men

Achievements and titles
- Highest world ranking: 2nd
Medal record
Men's snowboarding
Representing Australia
World Championships
Gold medal – first place	2011 La Molina	Snowboard cross
Gold medal – first place	2013 Stoneham	Snowboard cross
Bronze medal – third place	2017 Sierra Nevada	Snowboard cross
Winter X Games
Silver medal – second place	2016 Aspen	Snowboard cross
New Zealand Winter Games
Gold medal – first place	2011 Cardrona	Snowboard cross
- Updated on 31 January 2016

Alex Pullin (20 September 1987 – 8 July 2020), nicknamed Chumpy, was an Australian snowboarder who competed at the 2010, 2014 and 2018 Winter Olympics. He was a two-time snowboard cross (boardercross) world champion.

== Early life ==
Pullin was born on 20 September 1987 in Mansfield, Victoria. He started snowboarding at a young age, and came to prefer snowboard cross, because he considered it "the most pure form of competition". His parents owned a ski hire shop.

== Career ==
Pullin competed for Australia at the 2010 Winter Olympics in snowboard cross (boardercross). He had the fastest qualifying time (1:20.15) in his event, but was eliminated in the first round of competition, finishing in 17th place by virtue of his qualifying time.

Pullin was the flag bearer for the Australian Winter Olympic team at the 2014 Winter Olympics in Sochi, Russia, and competed in the men's snowboard cross. One of the favourites in that event, Pullin was eliminated in the quarterfinals. The Australian government had given Pullin $500,000 in funding for the event, more than any other Australian competitor. At the 2018 Winter Olympics, Pullin again competed in the Men's Snowboard Cross and came in sixth place, having crashed out during the final race. He was the number one ranked competitor in the event according to the world rankings prior to the Games. Fellow Australian Jarryd Hughes came second at the event, but Pullin did not congratulate him due to a personal feud between them.

Aside from the Olympics, Pullin began competing in the Winter X Games in 2008. He won a silver medal in the 2016 event in Aspen, Colorado, United States. He won the snowboard cross events at the 2011 and 2013 FIS Snowboarding World Championships, making him the first Australian to defend a Snowboarding World Championships title. Pullin also won the overall snowboard cross title in the 2010–11 FIS Snowboard World Cup and the 2012–13 FIS Snowboard World Cup. In 2011, he won a gold medal at the New Zealand Winter Games.

In 2011, he became an ambassador for Suzuki Australia as part of a sponsorship with the vehicle manufacturer. Outside of snowboarding, Pullin fronted a reggae band called Love Charli.

In 2020, Pullin announced his retirement from the sport.

== Death ==
On 8 July 2020, Pullin drowned on the Gold Coast in Queensland, at the age of 32. He was believed to have been spearfishing by himself at an artificial reef off Palm Beach. Pullin's body was spotted on the ocean floor by a snorkeler. Lifeguards attempted to resuscitate him using cardiopulmonary resuscitation for 45–50 minutes, but he did not recover.

On 25 October 2021, fifteen months after Pullin's death, his partner Ellidy Pullin gave birth to their daughter, conceived by in vitro fertilisation.

Olympic Games
Preceded by Torah Bright	Flagbearer for Australia; Sochi 2014	Succeeded by Scotty James
