= Federico Raimo =

Italian snowboarder

Personal information
- Nationality: Italian
- Born: November 13, 1986 (age 38)

Sport
- Sport: Snowboarding

Federico Raimo (born 13 November 1986 in Aosta) is an Italian snowboarder. He placed 22nd in the men's snowboard cross event at the 2010 Winter Olympics.
