= Maciej Jodko =

Polish snowboarder

Maciej Jodko (born 24 November 1982) is a Polish snowboarder. He was born in Rzeszów. He competed at the 2010 Winter Olympics in Vancouver, where he placed 28th in men's snowboard cross. He competed in snowboard cross at the FIS Snowboarding World Championships 2011 and 2013 He competed at the 2014 Winter Olympics in Sochi, in snowboard cross.
