= Mateusz Ligocki =

Polish snowboarder

Mateusz Ligocki (born 18 June 1982) is a Polish snowboarder. He was born in Cieszyn, and is the brother of Michał Ligocki. He competed at the 2006 Winter Olympics in Turin, in snowboard cross and halfpipe, and at the 2010 Winter Olympics in Vancouver, where he placed 29th in men's snowboard cross. He competed in snowboard cross at the FIS Snowboarding World Championships 2011 and 2013. He also competed in the 2014 Winter Olympics in Sochi, in snowboard cross.
