= Mario Fuchs =

Austrian snowboarder

Mario Fuchs (born 9 August 1976) is a professional snowboarder from Austria. His speciality is the snowboardcross.

== Career highlights ==
Olympic Winter Games
2006 - Torino, 30th at snowboardcross
FIS World Snowboard Championships
2005 - Whistler, 27th at snowboardcross
2007 - Arosa, 6th at snowboardcross
World Cup
2003 - Bad Gastein, (bronze) 3rd at snowboardcross
2004 - Valle Nevado, (bronze) 3rd at snowboardcross
2004 - Nassfeld-Hermagor, (bronze) 3rd at snowboardcross
2006 - Bad Gastein, (gold) 1st at snowboardcross
2008 - Bad Gastein, (gold) 1st at snowboardcross
2008 - Leysin, (gold) 1st at snowboardcross
European Cup
2003 - Berchtesgaden, (gold) 1st at snowboardcross
2003 - Krynica, (silver) 2nd at snowboardcross
2005 - Bad Gastein, (gold) 1st at snowboardcross
South American Cup
2004 - Valle Nevado, (gold) 1st at snowboardcross
FIS Races
2007 - Kaunertal, (gold) 1st at snowboardcross
