= Konstantin Schad =

German snowboarder

Konstantin Schad OLY
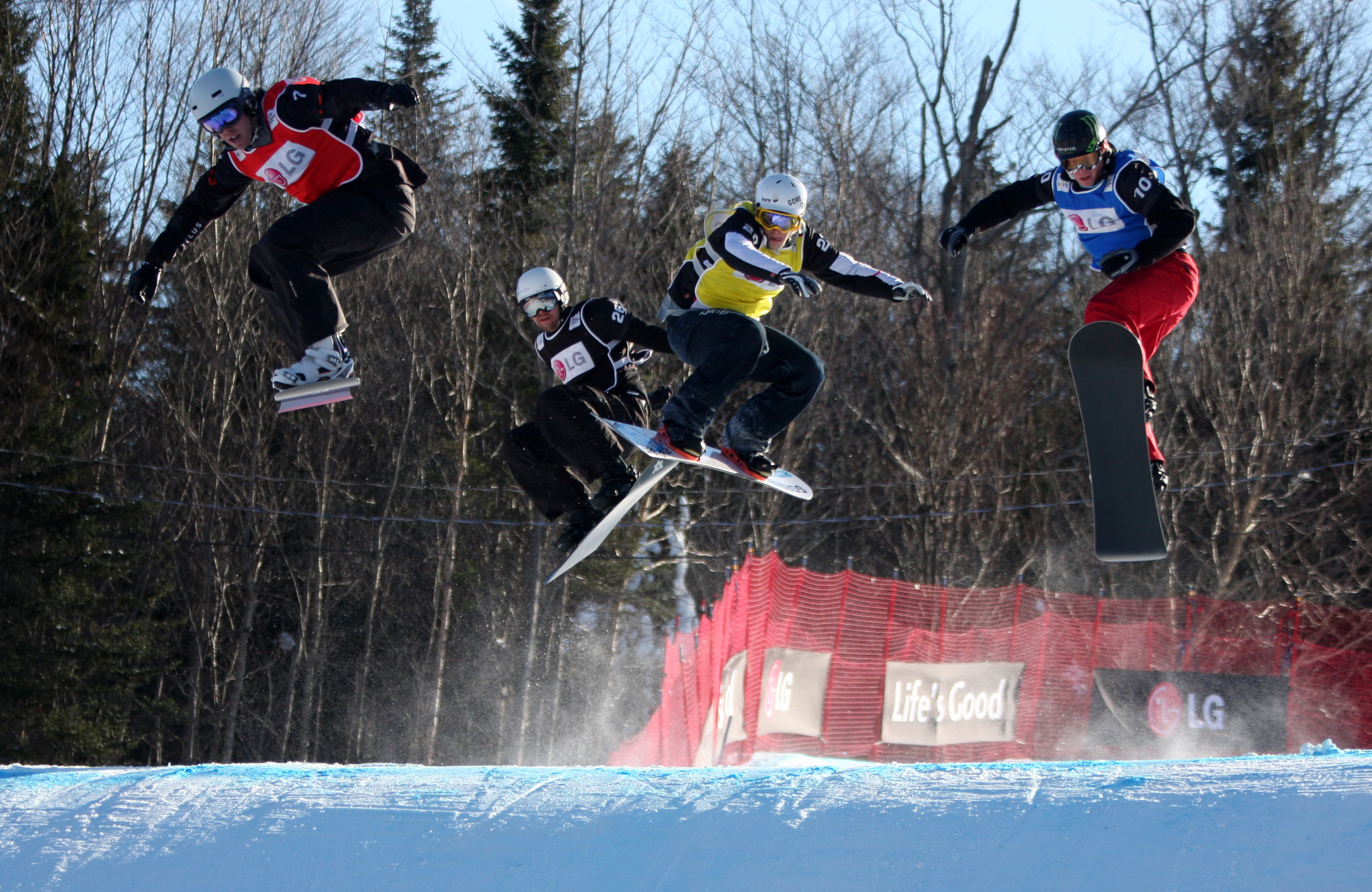

Personal information
- Born: 25 July 1987 (age 38) Rosenheim, West Germany

Sport
- Sport: Skiing

World Cup career
- Indiv. podiums: 2
- Indiv. wins: 1
Medal record
Men's snowboarding
Representing Germany
Winter X Games
Bronze medal – third place	2016 Aspen	Snowboard cross

Konstantin Schad (born 25 July 1987 in Rosenheim) is a German snowboarder, specializing in snowboard cross.

Schad competed at the 2010 and 2014 Winter Olympics for Germany. He was 33rd in the 2010 snowboard cross, not advancing to the elimination round. In the 2014 snowboard cross, he won his 1/8-round race, but finished 4th in his quarterfinal, not advancing, and finishing 13th overall.

As of September 2014, his best showing at the World Championships is 18th, in the 2011 snowboard cross.

Schad made his World Cup debut in February 2007. As of September 2014, he has one World Cup victory, at Valmalenco in 2011–12. His best overall finish was 4th, also in 2011–12.

== World Cup podiums ==
Date	Location	Rank	Event
3 March 2012	Valmalenco	1st place, gold medalist(s)	Snowboard cross
21 December 2013	Lake Louise	2nd place, silver medalist(s)	Snowboard cross
