= Rok Rogelj =

Slovene snowboarder (born 1987)

Personal information
- Nationality: Slovenian
- Born: May 12, 1987 (age 37)

Sport
- Sport: Snowboarding

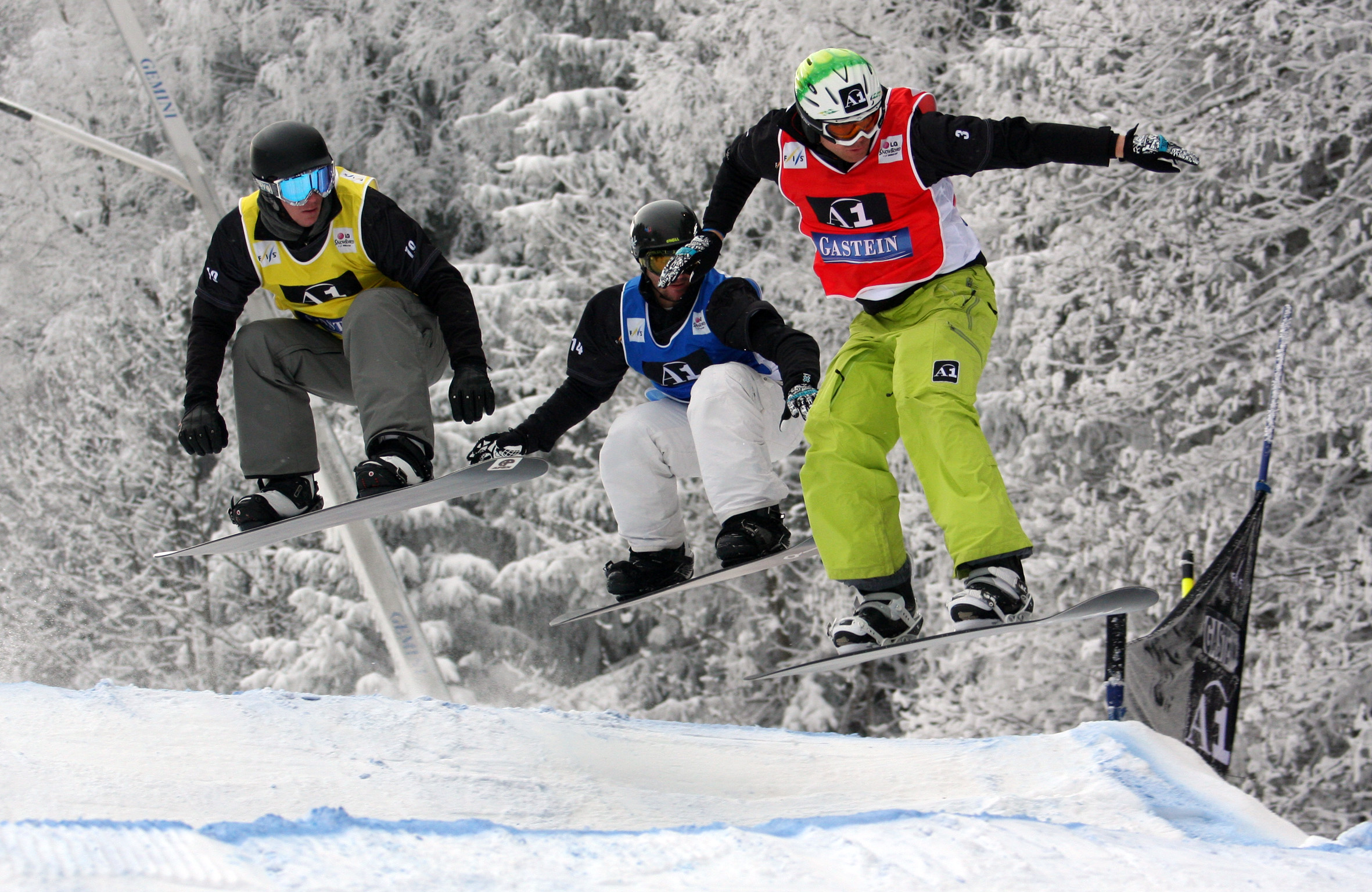

Rok Rogelj (born 12 May 1987 in Ljubljana) is a Slovene snowboarder. He placed 24th in the men's snowboard cross event at the 2010 Winter Olympics.
