= Andrey Boldykov =

Russian snowboarder (born 1983)

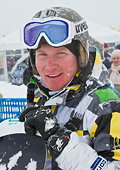

Personal information
- Full name: Andrey Sergeyevich Boldykov
- Born: 4 October 1983 (age 42) Tashtagol, Russian SSR, Soviet Union

Sport
- Sport: Skiing

World Cup career
- Indiv. podiums: 2
- Indiv. wins: 1

Andrey Sergeyevich Boldykov (Russian: Андрей Сергеевич Болдыков, born 4 October 1983 in Tashtagol) is a Russian snowboarder, specializing in snowboard cross.

Boldykov competed at the 2010 and 2014 Winter Olympics for Russia. In the 2010 snowboard cross, he qualified in 20th place, then won his 1/8 round race, but did not advance from his quarterfinal, where he finished 3rd, ending up 15th overall. In the 2014 snowboard cross, he finished 5th in his 1/8 round race, not advancing and finishing 33rd overall.

As of September 2014, his best showing at the World Championships is 5th, in the 2013 snowboard cross.

Boldykov made his World Cup debut in January 2005. As of September 2014, he has one World Cup victory, coming at Veysonnaz in 2011–12. He finished 2nd in the overall World Cup in 2011–12.

== World Cup podiums ==
Date	Location	Rank	Event
19 January 2012	Veysonnaz	2nd place, silver medalist(s)	Snowboard cross
16 March 2012	Valmalenco	1st place, gold medalist(s)	Snowboard cross
