= Stefano Pozzolini =

Italian snowboarder

Personal information
- Nationality: Italian
- Born: July 31, 1977 (age 47)

Sport
- Sport: Snowboarding

Stefano Pozzolini (born 31 July 1977 in Genoa) is an Italian snowboarder. He competed in the men's snowboard cross event at the 2006 Winter Olympics, placing 24th, and the 2010 Winter Olympics, placing fourteenth.
