= Seth Wescott =

American snowboarder (born 1976)

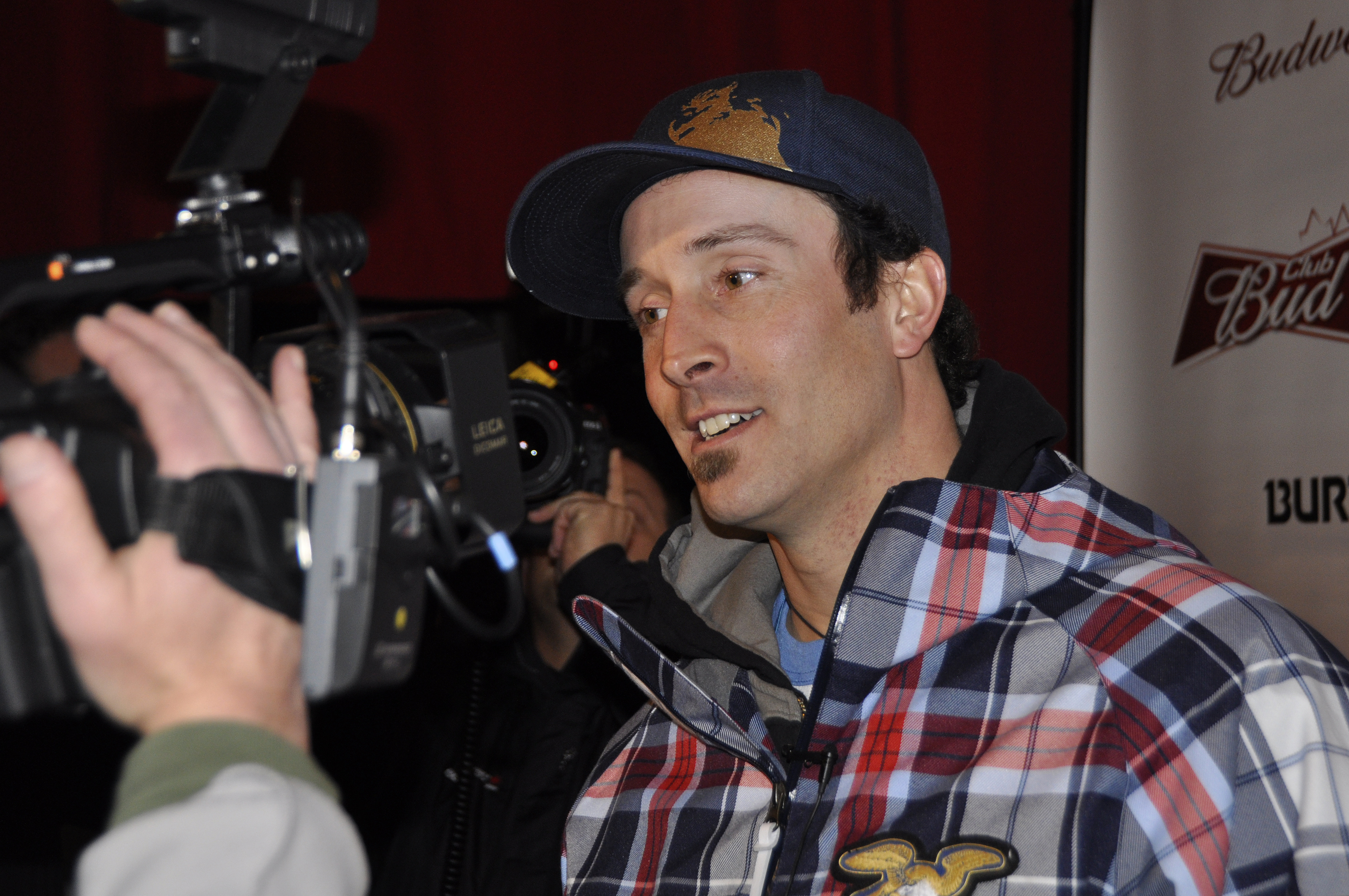

Personal information
- Born: June 28, 1976 (age 50) Durham, North Carolina, U.S.
- Height: 6 ft 1 in (185 cm)

Sport
- Country: United States
- Sport: Snowboarding
- Event: Snowboard Cross
Medal record
Men's snowboarding
Representing the United States
Olympic Games
| Gold medal – first place | 2006 Torino | Snowboard cross |
| Gold medal – first place | 2010 Vancouver | Snowboard cross |
World Championships
| Gold medal – first place | 2005 Whistler | Snowboard cross |
| Silver medal – second place | 2003 Kreischberg | Snowboard cross |
| Silver medal – second place | 2007 Arosa | Snowboard cross |
| Silver medal – second place | 2011 La Molina | Snowboard cross |
Winter X Games
| Silver medal – second place | 2004 Aspen | Snowboard cross |
| Silver medal – second place | 2005 Aspen | Snowboard cross |
| Silver medal – second place | 2010 Aspen | Snowboard cross |
| Bronze medal – third place | 2007 Aspen | Snowboard cross |

Seth Wescott (born June 28, 1976) is an American snowboarder. He is a two-time Olympic champion in the snowboard cross.

== Life and career ==
Wescott was born in Durham, North Carolina, and lives in Whistler, British Columbia. Growing up, Wescott went to Mount Blue regional school district in Farmington, Maine. His father Jim Wescott was the Track and Cross Country coach at Colby College. He began snowboarding at age 10, but had also grown up skiing. In 1989, after competing in both sports for a few years, he stopped skiing to focus mainly on snowboarding. Wescott attended Carrabassett Valley Academy where he studied and trained with fellow Olympians Bode Miller, Jeff Greenwood, Kirsten Clark and Emily Cook. He started out at Sugarloaf in Carrabassett Valley, Maine.

In his Olympic debut, at the 2006 Winter Olympics in Turin, Italy, Wescott won gold in the snowboard cross as the first Olympic champion in the event. Having won gold, Wescott was invited to meet president George W. Bush, but turned down the offer, citing his opposition to Bush's foreign and domestic policies. At the 2010 Winter Olympics in Vancouver, British Columbia, Canada, Wescott successfully defended his Olympic gold. Wescott, who started off the race in fourth, slowly advanced throughout the field until the end, when he narrowly defeated hometown favorite Mike Robertson on the final jump.

Wescott co-owns The Rack, a restaurant and bar near Sugarloaf that caters food and drinks to skiers and snowboarders.

On February 25, 2010, Wescott appeared on The Colbert Report. In 2012, he participated in Fox's dating game show The Choice.

Wescott attended Western State College in Gunnison, CO.
