= Mike Robertson (snowboarder) =

Canadian snowboarder

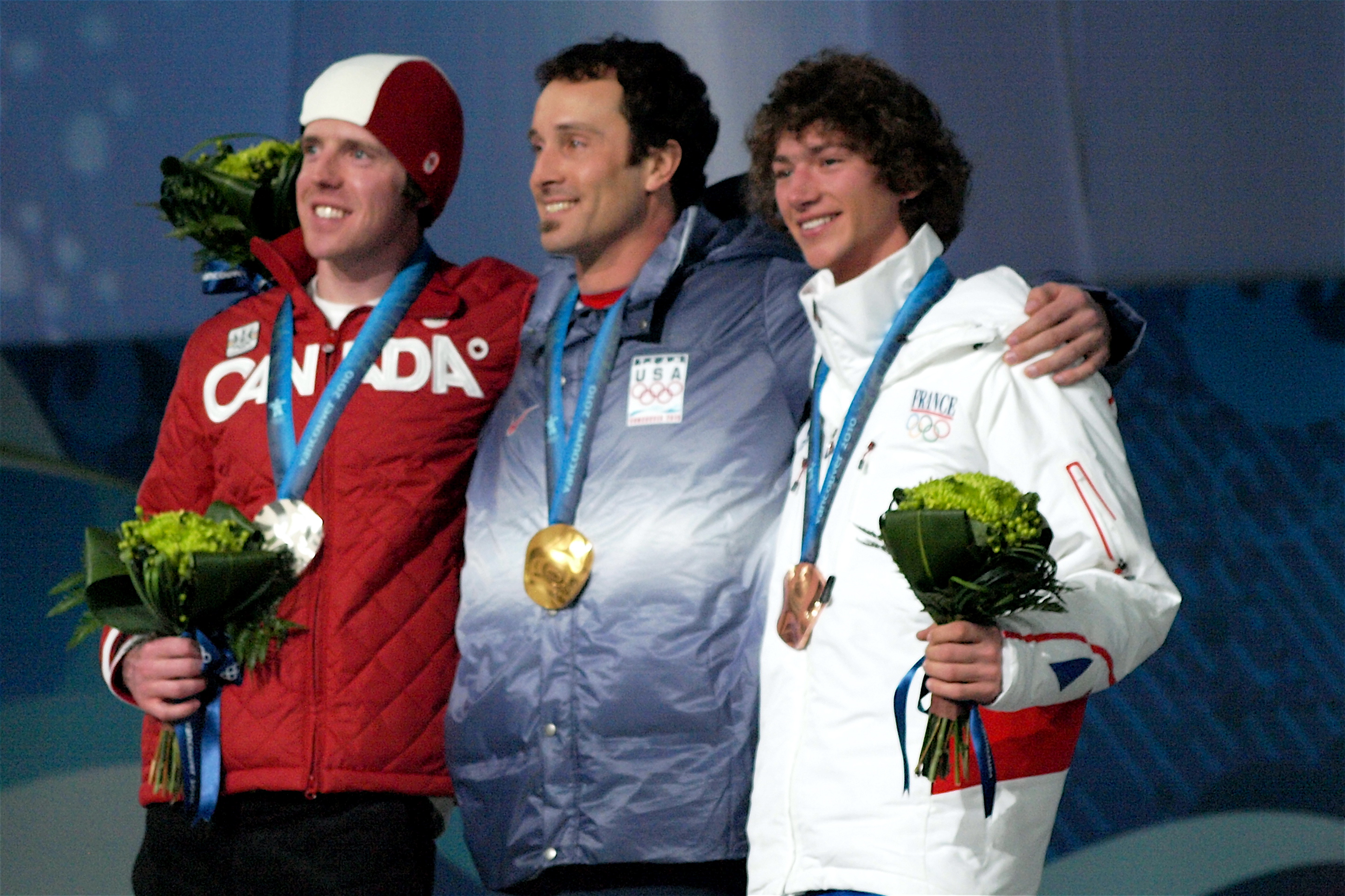
- 2010 Winter Olympic men's Snowboard Cross medalists. Left: Mike Robertson

Personal information
- Born: February 26, 1985 (age 41) Edmonton, Alberta, Canada
- Height: 1.85 m (6 ft 1 in)
- Weight: 83 kg (183 lb; 13.1 st)

Sport
- Country: Canada
Medal record
Men's snowboarding
Representing Canada
Olympic Games
Silver medal – second place	2010 Vancouver	Snowboard cross

Mike Robertson (born February 26, 1985) is a Canadian retired snowboarder. He resides in Canmore, Alberta. His home mountain was Lake Louise. Robertson won a silver medal in snowboard cross at the 2010 Winter Olympics in Vancouver and was considered somewhat of an unknown and surprise medalist. He retired in 2012 after suffering post-concussion syndrome from three notable head injuries.

== Career ==
Robertson first started snowboarding at the World Cup level in 2003. His first World Cup podium result came on January 11, 2009, when he won a bronze medal. A month later, he reached the World Cup podium again, this time with a silver medal. He participated in the 2010 Winter Olympics in Vancouver where he won the Silver Medal in the snowboard cross. Robertson was in contention for the gold and was leading at the final corner when he was passed by Seth Wescott. With winning the silver he said that "It was kind of bittersweet. Obviously I wanted to win for sure, but I'm so happy to be second. It's amazing."

Through his career he suffered several concussions with one in 2008 and 2009. While attending a training camp in September 2010 Robertson suffered another concussion in New Zealand, this effectively ended his career and he announced his retirement from competition some time later. With the disappointing end to his career he stated that "I would have loved to represent Canada at another Olympics. I didn't want an injury to end my career, but after two years of struggling with concussion symptoms and trying to recover again and again, I had to make the best decision for my long-term health." A specialist had determined that he had suffered clear cognitive damage, which cemented the retirement for Robertson.
