= Simone Malusa =

Italian snowboarder

Personal information
- Nationality: Italian
- Born: January 26, 1974 (age 51)

Sport
- Sport: Snowboarding

Simone Malusa (born 26 January 1974 in Ivrea) is an Italian snowboarder. He competed in the men's snowboard cross event in the 2006 Winter Olympics, placing 33rd, and the 2010 Winter Olympics, placing 30th.
