= David Speiser =

German snowboarder

Personal information
- Nationality: German
- Born: August 27, 1980 (age 44)

Sport
- Sport: Snowboarding

David Speiser (born 27 August 1980 in Oberstdorf) is a German snowboarder. He competed in the men's snowboard cross event at the 2006 Winter Olympics, placing 32nd, and the 2010 Winter Olympics, placing eighth.
