= Luca Matteotti =

Italian snowboarder

Medal record

Men's snowboarding

Representing Italy

World Championships
Gold medal – first place	2015 Kreischberg	Snowboard Cross

Luca Matteotti (born 14 October 1989) is an Italian snowboarder. He has represented Italy at the 2014 Winter Olympics in Sochi.
