= Pierre Vaultier =

French snowboarder (born 1987)

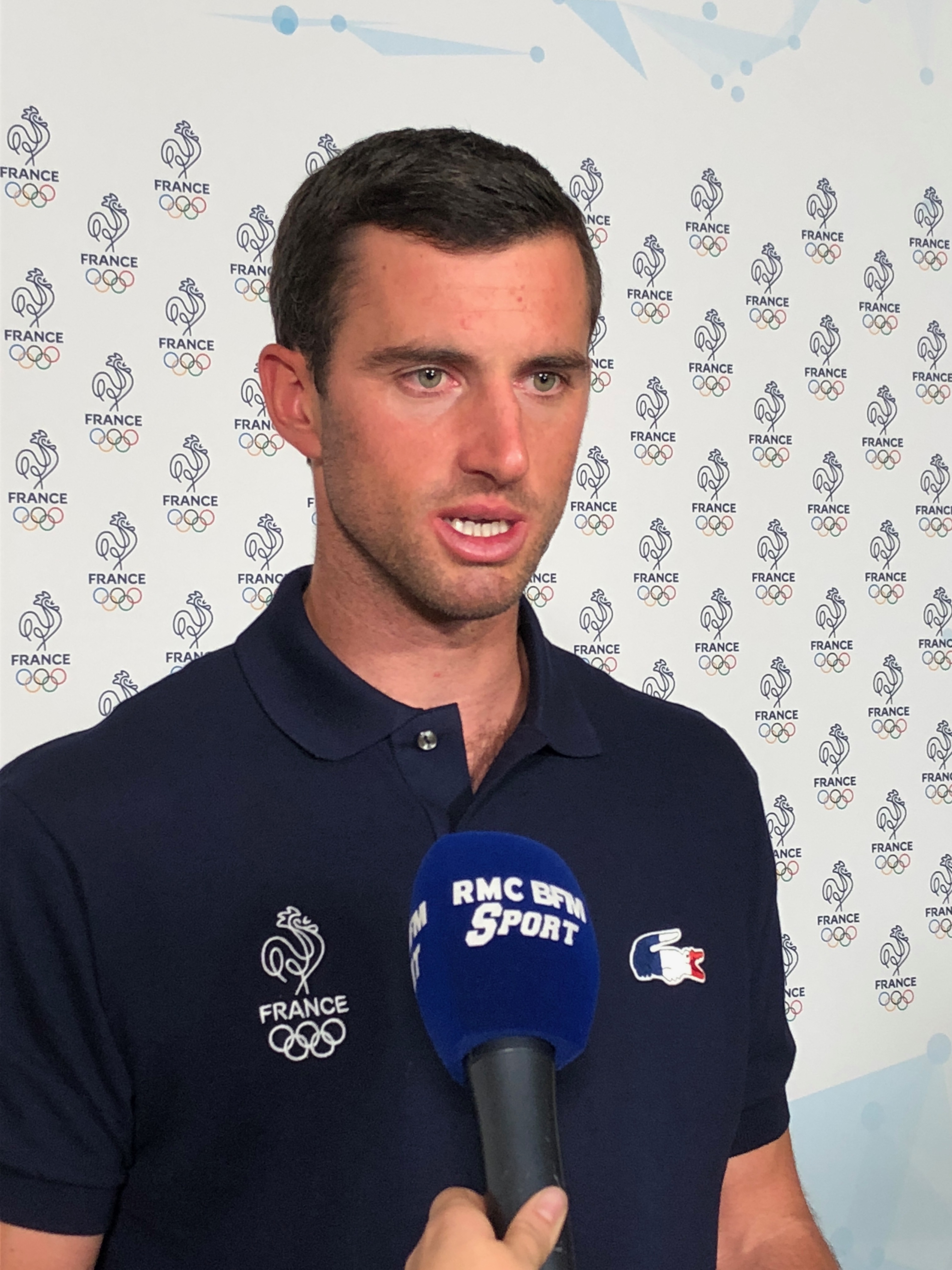

Personal information
- Full name: Pierre Benjamin Florent Vaultier
- Born: 24 June 1987 (age 39) Briançon, France
- Height: 1.86 m (6 ft 1 in)
Medal record
Men's snowboarding
Representing France
Olympic Games
Gold medal – first place	2014 Sochi	Snowboard cross
Gold medal – first place	2018 Pyeongchang	Snowboard cross
World Championships
Gold medal – first place	2017 Sierra Nevada	Snowboard cross
- Updated on 16 February 2014

Pierre Benjamin Florent Vaultier (French pronunciation: [pjɛʁ voltje]; born 24 June 1987) is a French two-time Olympic Gold Champion, and one-time World Gold Champion snowboarder, specializing in snowboard cross.

== Career ==
Vaultier started snowboarding at the age of six at Serre Chevalier, one of the major French ski resorts located in the southern part of the Alps. He debuted competition in 1997. He joined the young French team in 2004 and then the older team one year later. He operated in the "Écrins Snowboard" club of Puy-Saint-Vincent in 2005. He participated in the 2006 Winter Olympics in Turino and at the X Games in 2007. On 13 March 2008 he won the crystal globe in snowboarding by finishing second in the final round of the 2007–08 FIS Snowboard World CupWorld Cup at Chiesa in Valmalenco. On 13 December 2008 he slipped during training at Serre Chevalier and suffered a lumbar fracture. After undergoing surgery in Grenoble, he missed the majority of the season but was the leader in following World Cup in Chapelco, Argentina.

=== 2010: return and climb ===
After the 2009 season marked by his injury, Vaultier began the World Cup 2010 at Chapelco with a victory before Seth Wescott. Since then he added three more victories to this winter at Telluride, Veysonnaz and in Quebec at Stoneham, as well as a second place at Bad Gastein. He was a designated favorite at the 2010 Winter Olympics in Vancouver.

=== 2014: Sochi ===
Two months after tearing his anterior cruciate ligament (ACL), Vaultier won the gold medal in the snowboard cross at the 2014 Winter Olympics in Sochi.

=== 2018: Pyeongchang ===
After surviving a crash in the semifinals of the 2018 Winter Olympics in Pyeongchang to finish in the third and final qualifying place, Vaultier surged ahead of the pack in the final to win gold. This was his second gold medal in the Olympic snowboard cross.
