= Tony Ramoin =

French snowboarder (born 1988)

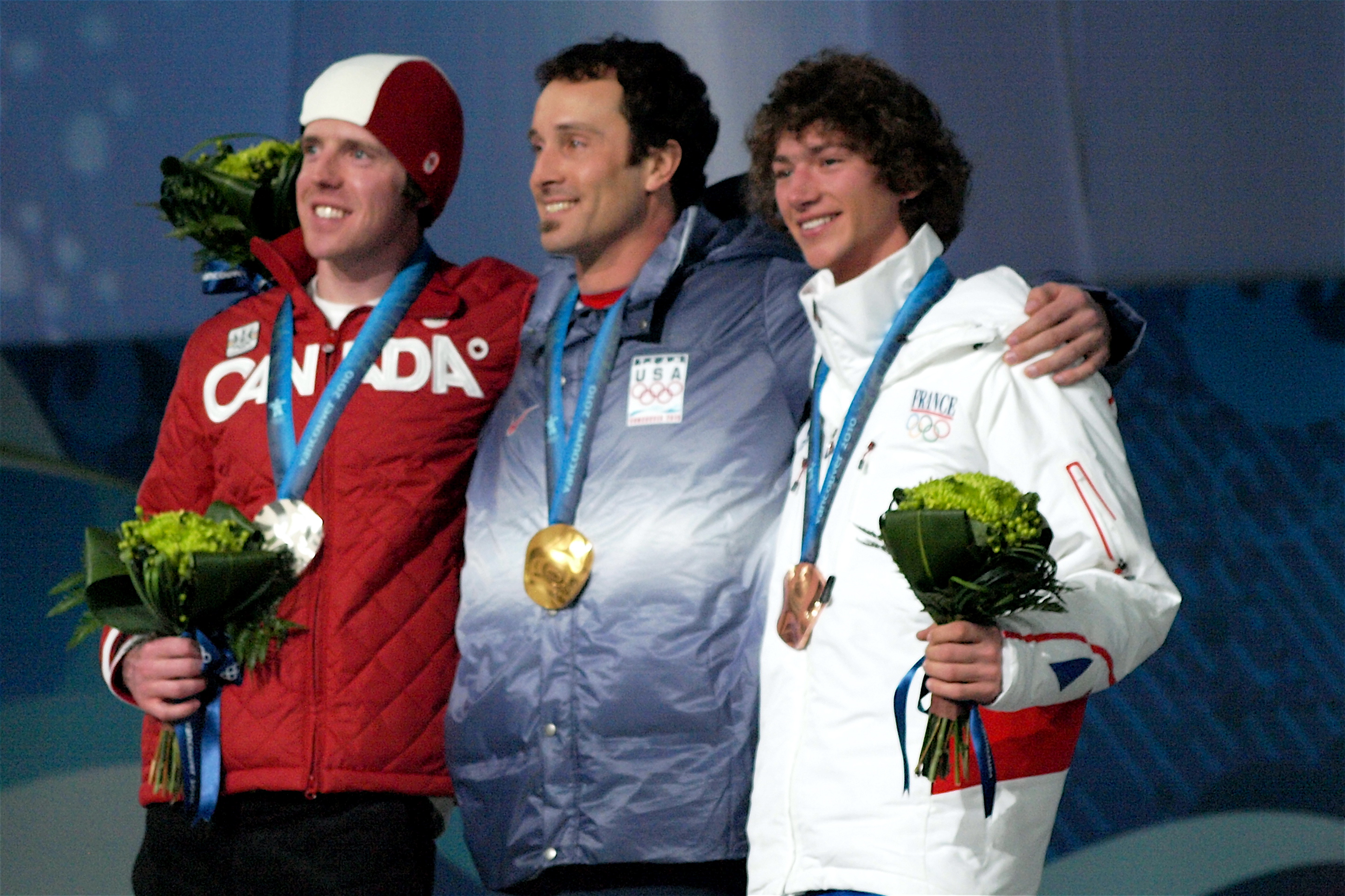
- Ramoin (right) at the 2010 Winter Olympics

Personal information
- Born: Tony Elis Frédéric Ramoin; 23 December 1988 (age 37) Cannes, France
Medal record
Men's snowboarding
Representing France
Olympic Games
Bronze medal – third place	2010 Vancouver	Snowboard cross

Tony Elis Frédéric Ramoin (French pronunciation: [tɔni ʁamwɛ̃]; born 23 December 1988) is a French snowboarder, who won a bronze medal in snowboard cross at the 2010 Winter Olympics.

== Honours ==
- Knight of the Ordre national du Mérite (2010)
