= FIS Snowboarding World Championships 2011 =

2011 edition of the FIS Snowboarding World Championships

- Host city: La Molina / Barcelona
- Country: Spain
- Events: 9
- Opening: January 14, 2011
- Closing: January 22, 2011

The FIS Snowboarding World Championships 2011 was an international snowboarding competition held from January 14 to 22, 2011, in La Molina and Barcelona (Catalonia, Spain) by the FIS Snowboarding World Championship,

All the competitions were held in La Molina, except the big air competition, which was held in Barcelona.

== Organisation ==
=== Media and marketing ===
The TV broadcast rights were sold to Eurosport in Europe, CBC in Canada, Sky A in Japan, and ORF was given the rights to broadcast in Austria.

=== Venues ===
The world championships began with the big air competition at the Palau Sant Jordi arena in Barcelona. A ramp 102 feet (31 m) long was constructed on the location and an estimated 17,000 fans attended the finals of the event on January 15. The remaining events all took place in La Molina beginning on January 17. La Molina is two hours north of Barcelona in the Pyrenees and is the oldest ski resort in Spain.

Similar to the 2010 Winter Olympics, the La Molina venue suffered from excessive warmth which threatened the events for the World Championships. Much of the surrounding slopes were barren of snow as most of the remaining snow was piled on the courses and venues for the event.

== Results ==
=== Men's events ===
Event	Gold		Silver		Bronze	
Big air	Petja Piiroinen (FIN)	51.7	Seppe Smits (BEL) *	48.9	Rocco van Straten (NED)	47.4
Halfpipe	Nathan Johnstone (AUS)	26.8	Iouri Podladtchikov (SWI)	26.2	Markus Malin (FIN)	24.3
Slopestyle	Seppe Smits (BEL)	28.7	Niklas Mattsson (SWE)	28.1	Ville Paumola (FIN)	26.2
Snowboard cross	Alex Pullin (AUS)		Seth Wescott (USA)		Nate Holland (USA)	
Parallel giant slalom	Benjamin Karl (AUT)		Rok Marguč (SLO)		Roland Fischnaller (ITA)	
Parallel slalom	Benjamin Karl (AUT)		Simon Schoch (SWI)		Rok Marguč (SLO)	

- Original silver medalist Zachary Stone of Canada was stripped of the silver medal, because he tested positive for cannabis.

=== Women's events ===
Event	Gold		Silver		Bronze	
Halfpipe	Holly Crawford (AUS)	26.7	Ursina Haller (SWI)	23.4	Liu Jiayu (CHN)	22.5
Slopestyle	Enni Rukajärvi (FIN)	28.2	Šárka Pančochová (CZE)	25.2	Shelly Gotlieb (NZL)	21.6
Snowboard cross	Lindsey Jacobellis (USA)		Nelly Moenne Loccoz (FRA)		Dominique Maltais (CAN)	
Parallel giant slalom	Alena Zavarzina (RUS)		Claudia Riegler (AUT)		Doris Günther (AUT)	
Parallel slalom	Hilde-Katrine Engeli (NOR)		Nicolien Sauerbreij (NED)		Claudia Riegler (AUT)	

== Medal table ==
17 countries won medals at these championships, a new record. The Czech Republic and New Zealand won their first medals at the World Snowboarding Championships, while Belgium won its first ever gold medal.

Rank	Nation	Gold	Silver	Bronze	Total
1	Australia (AUS)	3	0	0	3
2	Austria (AUT)	2	1	2	5
3	Finland (FIN)	2	0	2	4
4	United States (USA)	1	1	1	3
5	Belgium (BEL)	1	1	0	2
6	Norway (NOR)	1	0	0	1
6	Russia (RUS)	1	0	0	1
8	Switzerland (SUI)	0	3	0	3
9	Netherlands (NED)	0	1	1	2
9	Slovenia (SLO)	0	1	1	2
11	Czech Republic (CZE)	0	1	0	1
11	France (FRA)	0	1	0	1
11	Sweden (SWE)	0	1	0	1
14	Canada (CAN)	0	0	1	1
14	China (CHN)	0	0	1	1
14	Italy (ITA)	0	0	1	1
14	New Zealand (NZL)	0	0	1	1
Totals (17 entries)		11	11	11	33

== Participating nations ==
A record of 370 participants from 44 nations competed. Canada has sent the biggest team with 47 entries and 31 athletes, while Montenegro only sent a delegation of one.

- Argentina (2)
- Australia
- Austria
- Belgium
- Belarus
- Brazil (2)
- Bulgaria
- Canada (31)
- Chile
- China
- Croatia
- Czech Republic
- Denmark
- Estonia
- Finland (21)
- France
- Georgia (2)
- Germany
- Greece
- Hungary
- Italy
- Japan
- Kazakhstan (2)
- Kyrgyzstan (4)
- Montenegro (1)
- New Zealand
- Netherlands
- Norway
- Peru (1)
- Poland
- Poland
- Romania
- Russia
- Serbia
- Slovakia
- Slovenia
- South Africa
- South Korea
- Spain (21)
- Sweden
- Switzerland
- Ukraine
- United Kingdom
- United States (21)
