= FIS Freestyle Ski and Snowboarding World Championships 2017 – Men's snowboard cross =

The men's snowboard cross competition of the FIS Freestyle Ski and Snowboarding World Championships 2017 was held at Sierra Nevada, Spain on March 10 (qualifying) and March 12 (finals). 54 athletes from 22 countries competed.

== Qualification ==
The following are the results of the qualification.

Rank	Bib	Name	Country	Run 1	Rank	Run 2	Rank	Best	Diff	Notes
1	16	Pierre Vaultier	France	1:09.15	1			1:09.15		Q
2	10	Lucas Eguibar	Spain	1:09.36	2			1:09.36	+0.21	Q
3	20	Regino Hernández	Spain	1:10.55	3			1:10.55	+1.40	Q
4	7	Alex Pullin	Australia	1:10.59	4			1:10.59	+1.44	Q
5	13	Kevin Hill	Canada	1:10.63	5			1:10.63	+1.48	Q
6	27	Daniil Dilman	Russia	1:10.65	6			1:10.65	+1.50	Q
7	12	Nikolay Olyunin	Russia	1:10.75	7			1:10.75	+1.60	Q
8	3	Jarryd Hughes	Australia	1:10.77	8			1:10.77	+1.62	Q
9	23	Anton Lindfors	Finland	1:10.84	9			1:10.84	+1.69	Q
10	6	Emanuel Perathoner	Italy	1:10.85	10			1:10.85	+1.70	Q
11	22	Julian Lüftner	Austria	1:10.97	11			1:10.97	+1.82	Q
12	33	Aleksandr Guzachev	Russia	1:11.02	12			1:11.02	+1.87	Q
13	31	Luca Matteotti	Italy	1:11.05	13			1:11.05	+1.90	Q
14	18	Adam Lambert	Australia	1:11.09	14			1:11.09	+1.94	Q
15	9	Omar Visintin	Italy	1:11.35	15			1:11.35	+2.20	Q
16	39	Paul Berg	Germany	1:11.40	16			1:11.40	+2.25	Q
17	8	Markus Schairer	Austria	1:11.48	17			1:11.48	+2.33	Q
18	21	Christopher Robanske	Canada	1:11.50	18			1:11.50	+2.35	Q
19	5	Nate Holland	United States	1:11.60	19			1:02.12	+2.45	Q
20	4	Hagen Kearney	United States	1:11.63	20			1:11.63	+2.48	Q
21	2	Alex Deibold	United States	1:11.64	21			1:11.64	+2.49	Q
22	11	Alessandro Hämmerle	Austria	1:11.68	22			1:11.68	+2.53	Q
23	34	Tim Watter	Switzerland	1:11.73	23			1:11.73	+2.58	Q
24	32	Kalle Koblet	Switzerland	1:11.86	24			1:11.86	+2.71	Q
25	17	Cameron Bolton	Australia	DNF		1:11.11	1	1:11.11	+1.96	q
26	26	Christian Ruud Myhre	Norway	1:12.79	31	1:11.80	2	1:11.80	+2.65	q
27	19	Lluís Marin Tarroch	Andorra	1:12.32	27	1:11.83	3	1:11.83	+2.68	q
28	49	Laro Herrero	Spain	1:12.05	25	1:12.75	10	1:12.05	+2.90	q
29	38	Loan Bozzolo	France	1:12.21	26	DSQ		1:12.21	+3.06	q
30	14	Nick Baumgartner	United States	1:12.41	28	1:12.26	4	1:12.26	+3.11	q
31	35	Steven Williams	Argentina	1:13.16	33	1:12.38	5	1:12.38	+3.23	q
32	30	Merlin Surget	France	DNF		1:12.55	6	1:12.55	+3.40	q
33	24	Tommaso Leoni	Italy	1:12.61	29	1:12.56	7	1:12.56	+3.41	q
34	29	Martin Noerl	Germany	DNF		1:12.64	8	1:12.64	+3.49	q
35	45	Karel Van Goor	Netherlands	1:12.71	30	1:12.71	9	1:12.71	+3.56	q
36	43	Jan Kubičík	Czech Republic	1:15.92	42	1:12.77	11	1:12.77	+3.62	q
37	28	Shinya Momono	Japan	1:12.87	32	1:13.20	13	1:12.87	+3.72	q
38	1	Lukas Pachner	Austria	1:13.50	35	1:13.02	12	1:13.02	+3.87	q
39	44	Mateusz Ligocki	Poland	DNF		1:13.21	14	1:13.21	+4.06	q
40	42	Sebastian Pietrzykowski	Germany	1:14.07	38	1:13.23	15	1:13.23	+4.08	q
41	40	Duncan Campbell	New Zealand	1:13.33	34	1:13.84	17	1:13.33	+4.18	q
42	36	Glenn De Bois	Netherlands	1:13.78	36	1:13.52	16	1:13.52	+4.37	q
43	46	Simon White	Argentina	1:14.60	40	1:13.89	18	1:13.89	+4.74	q
44	15	Lorenzo Sommariva	Italy	1:14.01	37	DSQ		1:14.01	+4.86	q
45	41	Leon Beckhaus	Germany	1:14.52	39	1:14.20	19	1:14.20	+5.05	q
46	51	Alexis Tsokos	Greece	1:16.05	43	1:14.22	20	1:14.22	+5.07	q
47	25	Ken Vuagnoux	France	1:14.66	41	DSQ		1:14.66	+5.51	q
48	50	Muhammed Cem Boydak	Turkey	DSQ		1:18.46	21	1:18.46	+9.31	q
49	47	Woo Jin-yong	South Korea	DNF		1:35.31	22	1:35.31	+26.16	
	37	Tyler Jackson	Canada	DNS		DNS				
	48	Evgeniy Mukhutdinov	Russia	DNS		DNS				
	52	Michal Hanko	Czech Republic	DNS		DNS				
	53	Mun Jeong-uk	South Korea	DNS		DNS				
	54	Matouš Koudelka	Czech Republic	DNS		DNS				

== Elimination round ==
The following are the results of the elimination round.

=== 1/8 Finals ===
The top 48 qualifiers advanced to the 1/8 finals. From here, they participated in six-person elimination races, with the top three from each race advancing.

Heat 1

Rank	Bib	Name	Country	Notes
1	1	Pierre Vaultier	France	Q
2	17	Markus Schairer	Austria	Q
3	33	Tommaso Leoni	Italy	Q
4	48	Muhammed Cem Boydak	Turkey	
5	16	Paul Berg	Germany	
DNS	32	Melvin Surget	France	

Heat 2

Rank	Bib	Name	Country	Notes
1	41	Duncan Campbell	New Zealand	Q
2	40	Sebastian Pietrzykowski	Germany	Q
3	9	Anton Lindfors	Finland	Q
4	25	Cameron Bolton	Australia	
5	8	Jarryd Hughes	Australia	
DNF	24	Kalle Koblet	Switzerland	

Heat 3

Rank	Bib	Name	Country	Notes
1	5	Kevin Hill	Canada	Q
2	21	Alex Deibold	United States	Q
3	37	Shinya Momono	Japan	Q
4	28	Laro Herrero	Spain	
5	44	Lorenzo Sommariva	Italy	
DSQ	12	Aleksandr Guzachev	Russia	

Heat 4

Rank	Bib	Name	Country	Notes
1	20	Hagen Kearney	United States	Q
2	4	Alex Pullin	Australia	Q
3	13	Luca Matteoti	Italy	Q
4	36	Jan Kubičík	Czech Republic	
5	45	Leon Beckhaus	Germany	
6	29	Loan Bozzolo	France	

Heat 5

Rank	Bib	Name	Country	Notes
1	14	Adam Lambert	Australia	Q
2	30	Nick Baumgartner	United States	Q
3	35	Karel Van Goor	Netherlands	Q
4	19	Nate Holland	United States	
5	3	Regino Hernández	Spain	
DNF	46	Alexis Tsokos	Greece	

Heat 6

Rank	Bib	Name	Country	Notes
1	22	Alessandro Hämmerle	Austria	Q
2	6	Daniil Dilman	Russia	Q
3	11	Julian Lüftner	Austria	Q
4	27	Lluís Marin Tarroch	Andorra	
5	38	Lukas Pachner	Austria	
DNF	43	Simon White	Argentina	

Heat 7

Rank	Bib	Name	Country	Notes
1	7	Nikolay Olyunin	Russia	Q
2	39	Mateusz Ligocki	Poland	Q
3	10	Emanuel Perathoner	Italy	Q
DNF	23	Tim Watter	Switzerland	
DSQ	42	Glenn De Bois	Netherlands	
DSQ	26	Christian Ruud Myhre	Norway	

Heat 8

Rank	Bib	Name	Country	Notes
1	34	Martin Noerl	Germany	Q
2	15	Omar Visintin	Italy	Q
3	2	Lucas Eguibar	Spain	Q
4	31	Steven Williams	Argentina	
5	47	Ken Vuagnoux	France	
6	18	Christopher Robanske	Canada	

=== Quarterfinals ===
Heat 1

Rank	Bib	Name	Country	Notes
1	1	Pierre Vaultier	France	Q
2	17	Markus Schairer	Austria	Q
3	41	Duncan Campbell	New Zealand	Q
4	33	Tommaso Leoni	Italy	
5	40	Sebastian Pietrzykowski	Germany	
DNF	9	Anton Lindfors	Finland	

Heat 2

Rank	Bib	Name	Country	Notes
1	20	Hagen Kearney	United States	Q
2	4	Alex Pullin	Australia	Q
3	37	Shinya Momono	Japan	Q
4	21	Alex Deibold	United States	
5	13	Luca Matteoti	Italy	
6	5	Kevin Hill	Canada	

Heat 3

Rank	Bib	Name	Country	Notes
1	14	Adam Lambert	Australia	Q
2	22	Alessandro Hämmerle	Austria	Q
3	30	Nick Baumgartner	United States	Q
4	11	Julian Lüftner	Austria	
5	35	Karel Van Goor	Netherlands	
DSQ	6	Daniil Dilman	Russia	

Heat 4

Rank	Bib	Name	Country	Notes
1	2	Lucas Eguibar	Spain	Q
2	15	Omar Visintin	Italy	Q
3	39	Mateusz Ligocki	Poland	Q
4	10	Emanuel Perathoner	Italy	
5	7	Nikolay Olyunin	Russia	
6	34	Martin Noerl	Germany	

=== Semifinals ===
Heat 1

Rank	Bib	Name	Country	Notes
1	1	Pierre Vaultier	France	Q
2	8	Alex Pullin	Australia	Q
3	41	Duncan Campbell	New Zealand	Q
4	20	Hagen Kearney	United States	
5	17	Markus Schairer	Austria	
6	37	Shinya Momono	Japan	

Heat 2

Rank	Bib	Name	Country	Notes
1	14	Adam Lambert	Australia	Q
2	30	Nick Baumgartner	United States	Q
3	2	Lucas Eguibar	Spain	Q
4	15	Omar Visintin	Italy	
DSQ	22	Alessandro Hämmerle	Austria	
DNS	39	Mateusz Ligocki	Poland	

=== Finals ===
==== Small Finals ====
Rank	Bib	Name	Country	Notes
7	20	Hagen Kearney	United States	
8	17	Markus Schairer	Austria	
9	15	Omar Visintin	Italy	
10	37	Shinya Momono	Japan	
11	22	Alessandro Hämmerle	Austria	
12	39	Mateusz Ligocki	Poland	

==== Big Finals ====
Rank	Bib	Name	Country	Notes
1st place, gold medalist(s)	1	Pierre Vaultier	France	
2nd place, silver medalist(s)	2	Lucas Eguibar	Spain	
3rd place, bronze medalist(s)	8	Alex Pullin	Australia	
4	30	Nick Baumgartner	United States	
5	41	Duncan Campbell	New Zealand	
6	14	Adam Lambert	Australia	
