= FIS Freestyle Ski and Snowboarding World Championships 2015 – Men's snowboard cross =

Snowboarding competition

The women's snowboard halfpipe competition of the FIS Freestyle Ski and Snowboarding World Championships 2015 was held at Kreischberg, Austria on January 16 (qualifying) and January 17 (finals). 41 athletes from 15 countries competed.

== Qualification ==
The following are the results of the qualification.

Rank	Bib	Name	Country	Run 1	Rank	Run 2	Rank	Best	Diff	Notes
1	22	Alex Pullin	Australia	1:00.06	1			1:00.06		Q
2	2	Lucas Eguibar	Spain	1:00.35	2			1:00.35	+0.29	Q
3	11	Markus Schairer	Austria	1:00.76	3			1:00.76	+0.70	Q
4	24	Tommaso Leoni	Italy	1:00.76	3			1:00.76	+0.70	Q
5	6	Alex Deibold	United States	1:00.98	5			1:00.98	+0.92	Q
6	16	Nikolay Olyunin	Russia	1:01.03	6			1:01.03	+0.97	Q
7	5	Pierre Vaultier	France	1:01.03	6			1:01.03	+0.97	Q
8	3	Kevin Hill	Canada	1:01.08	8			1:01.08	+1.02	Q
9	21	Emanuel Perathoner	Italy	1:01.09	9			1:01.09	+1.03	Q
10	19	Nick Baumgartner	United States	1:01.19	10			1:01.19	+1.13	Q
11	31	Cameron Bolton	Australia	1:01.20	11			1:01.20	+1.14	Q
12	12	Christopher Robanske	Canada	1:01.26	12			1:01.26	+1.20	Q
13	14	Konstantin Schad	Germany	1:01.27	13			1:01.27	+1.21	Q
14	20	Lluis Marin Tarroch	Andorra	1:01.39	14			1:01.39	+1.33	Q
15	4	Regino Hernandez	Spain	1:01.53	15			1:01.53	+1.47	Q
16	23	Jussi Taka	Finland	1:01.55	16			1:01.55	+1.49	Q
17	7	Anton Lindfors	Finland	1:01.73	19	1:01.17	1	1:01.17	+1.11	q
18	15	Luca Matteotti	Italy	1:01.59	17	1:01.53	2	1:01.53	+1.47	q
19	30	Julian Lueftner	Austria	1:01.59	18	1:02.12	6	1:01.59	+1.53	q
20	26	Alessandro Hämmerle	Austria	1:01.73	20	1:02.25	10	1:01.73	+1.67	q
21	18	Nate Holland	United States	1:01.77	21	1:02.14	8	1:01.77	+1.71	q
22	46	Laro Herrero	Spain	1:03.16	36	1:01.84	3	1:01.84	+1.78	q
23	8	Stian Sivertzen	Norway	1:01.85	22	1:01.87	5	1:01.85	+1.79	q
24	43	Christian Ruud Myhre	Norway	1:03.01	34	1:01.86	4	1:01.86	+1.80	q
25	10	Paul Berg	Germany	1:01.87	23	1:02.27	11	1:01.87	+1.81	q
26	13	Omar Visintin	Italy	1:02.09	24	1:02.15	9	1:02.09	+2.03	q
27	41	Aleksandr Guzachev	Russia	1:03.87	40	1:02.12	6	1:02.12	+2.06	q
28	27	Ken Vuagnoux	France	1:02.22	25	1:07.45	33	1:02.22	+2.16	q
29	1	Jarryd Hughes	Australia	1:02.31	26	1:02.67	16	1:02.31	+2.25	q
30	29	Daniil Dilman	Russia	1:02.44	27	1:02.33	12	1:02.33	+2.27	q
31	32	Tony Ramoin	France	1:02.45	28	1:03.68	24	1:02.45	+2.39	q
32	17	Paul-Henri de le Rue	France	1:02.47	29	1:02.50	14	1:02.47	+2.41	q
33	40	Shinya Momono	Japan	1:02.81	31	1:02.47	13	1:02.47	+2.41	
34	28	Jerome Lymann	Switzerland	1:02.50	30	1:02.71	17	1:02.50	+2.44	
35	38	Baptiste Brochu	Canada	1:03.14	35	1:02.62	15	1:02.62	+2.56	
36	51	David Bakes	Czech Republic	1:02.83	32	1:03.28	22	1:02.83	+2.77	
37	45	Steven Williams	Argentina	1:02.98	33	1:02.85	18	1:02.85	+2.79	
38	39	Martin Noerl	Germany	1:03.33	38	1:03.01	19	1:03.01	+2.95	
39	25	Hanno Douschan	Austria	1:03.95	42	1:03.07	20	1:03.07	+3.01	
40	35	Matija Mihic	Slovenia	1:03.31	37	1:03.14	21	1:03.14	+3.08	
41	34	Rok Rogelj	Slovenia	1:03.49	39	1:03.42	23	1:03.42	+3.36	
42	49	Simon White	Argentina	1:04.49	46	1:03.86	25	1:03.86	+3.80	
43	48	Jan Kubicik	Czech Republic	1:03.87	41	1:03.99	26	1:03.87	+3.81	
44	36	Geza Kinda	Romania	1:04.48	45	1:04.14	27	1:04.14	+4.08	
45	9	Trevor Jacob	United States	1:04.18	43	1:04.83	29	1:04.18	+4.12	
46	37	Alexis Tsokos	Greece	1:04.42	44	1:04.82	28	1:04.42	+4.36	
47	33	Kevin Klossner	Switzerland	1:04.63	47	1:04.84	30	1:04.63	+4.57	
48	44	Daisuke Watanabe	Japan	1:04.93	48	1:04.86	31	1:04.86	+4.80	
49	52	Michal Hanko	Czech Republic	1:09.50	50	1:06.74	32	1:06.74	+6.68	
50	42	Tomas Galan de Malta	Argentina	1:08.17	49	1:07.48	34	1:07.48	+7.42	
51	50	Woo Jin-yong	South Korea	1:10.53	51	1:08.41	35	1:08.41	+8.35	
	47	Thomas Bankes	Great Britain	DNS		DNS				

== Elimination round ==
The following are the results of the elimination round.

=== 1/8 Finals ===
The top 32 qualifiers advanced to the 1/8 finals. From here, they participated in four-person elimination races, with the top two from each race advancing.

Heat 1

Rank	Bib	Name	Country	Notes
1	1	Alex Pullin	Australia	Q
2	17	Anton Lindfors	Finland	Q
3	32	Paul-Henri de le Rue	France	
4	16	Jussi Taka	Finland	

Heat 2

Rank	Bib	Name	Country	Notes
1	25	Paul Berg	Germany	Q
2	8	Kevin Hill	Canada	Q
3	24	Christian Ruud Myhre	Norway	
4	9	Emanuel Perathoner	Italy	

Heat 3

Rank	Bib	Name	Country	Notes
1	28	Ken Vuagnoux	France	Q
2	21	Nate Holland	United States	Q
3	5	Alex Deibold	United States	
4	12	Christopher Robanske	Canada	

Heat 4

Rank	Bib	Name	Country	Notes
1	4	Tommaso Leoni	Italy	Q
2	20	Alessandro Hämmerle	Austria	Q
3	13	Konstantin Schad	Germany	
4	29	Jarryd Hughes	Australia	

Heat 5

Rank	Bib	Name	Country	Notes
1	14	Lluis Marin Tarroch	Andorra	Q
2	19	Julian Lueftner	Austria	Q
3	30	Daniil Dilman	Russia	
4	3	Markus Schairer	Austria	DNS

Heat 6

Rank	Bib	Name	Country	Notes
1	11	Cameron Bolton	Australia	Q
2	22	Laro Herrero	Spain	Q
3	6	Nikolay Olyunin	Russia	
4	27	Aleksandr Guzachev	Russia	

Heat 7

Rank	Bib	Name	Country	Notes
1	10	Nick Baumgartner	United States	Q
2	7	Pierre Vaultier	France	Q
3	23	Stian Sivertzen	Norway	
4	26	Omar Visintin	Italy	

Heat 8

Rank	Bib	Name	Country	Notes
1	18	Luca Matteotti	Italy	Q
2	15	Regino Hernandez	Spain	Q
3	31	Tony Ramoin	France	
4	2	Lucas Eguibar	Spain	

=== Quarterfinals ===
Heat 1

Rank	Bib	Name	Country	Notes
1	1	Alex Pullin	Australia	Q
2	8	Kevin Hill	Canada	Q
3	25	Paul Berg	Germany	
4	17	Anton Lindfors	Finland	

Heat 2

Rank	Bib	Name	Country	Notes
1	20	Alessandro Hämmerle	Austria	Q
2	21	Nate Holland	United States	Q
3	28	Ken Vuagnoux	France	
4	4	Tommaso Leoni	Italy	

Heat 3

Rank	Bib	Name	Country	Notes
1	14	Lluis Marin Tarroch	Andorra	Q
2	22	Laro Herrero	Spain	Q
3	19	Julian Lueftner	Austria	
4	11	Cameron Bolton	Australia	

Heat 4

Rank	Bib	Name	Country	Notes
1	10	Nick Baumgartner	United States	Q
2	18	Luca Matteotti	Italy	Q
3	15	Regino Hernandez	Spain	
4	7	Pierre Vaultier	France	

=== Semifinals ===
Heat 1

Rank	Bib	Name	Country	Notes
1	21	Nate Holland	United States	Q
2	8	Kevin Hill	Canada	Q
3	20	Alessandro Hämmerle	Austria	
4	1	Alex Pullin	Australia	

Heat 2

Rank	Bib	Name	Country	Notes
1	18	Luca Matteotti	Italy	Q
2	10	Nick Baumgartner	United States	Q
3	14	Lluis Marin Tarroch	Andorra	
4	22	Laro Herrero	Spain	

=== Finals ===
==== Small Finals ====
Rank	Bib	Name	Country	Notes
5	20	Alessandro Hämmerle	Austria	
6	1	Alex Pullin	Australia	
7	22	Laro Herrero	Spain	
8	14	Lluis Marin Tarroch	Andorra	

==== Big Finals ====
Rank	Bib	Name	Country	Notes
1st place, gold medalist(s)	18	Luca Matteotti	Italy	
2nd place, silver medalist(s)	8	Kevin Hill	Canada	
3rd place, bronze medalist(s)	10	Nick Baumgartner	United States	
4	21	Nate Holland	United States	
