= Snowboarding at the 2013 Winter Universiade – Men's snowboard cross =

The men's snowboard cross competition of the 2013 Winter Universiade was held at Monte Bondone, Italy between December 11–12, 2013.

The seeding round was completed on December 11, while the elimination round was completed on December 12.

== Medalists ==
Gold	Hanno Douschan; Austria
Silver	Nikolay Olyunin; Russia
Bronze	Leo Trespeuch; France

== Results ==
=== Qualification ===
Rank	Bib	Name	Country	Run 1	Rank	Run 2	Rank	Best	Notes
1	46	Nikolay Olyunin	Russia	44.26	1	43.68	1	43.68	Q
2	38	Hanno Douschan	Austria	44.66	2	44.55	2	44.55	Q
3	37	Dawid Wal	Poland	45.18	5	44.65	3	44.65	Q
4	49	Emil Novák	Czech Republic	45.39	6	44.86	4	44.86	Q
5	45	Anton Koprivitsa	Russia	45.02	4	44.97	5	44.97	Q
6	35	Lukas Pachner	Austria	44.97	3	DNF		44.97	Q
7	36	Marcin Bocian	Poland	45.84	7	45.29	6	45.29	Q
8	34	Robin Ligeon	France	52.65	26	45.74	7	45.74	Q
9	43	Kevin Klossner	Switzerland	46.16	9	45.85	8	45.85	Q
10	54	Leo Trespeuch	France	46.92	12	45.87	9	45.87	Q
11	48	Thomas Bankes	Great Britain	46.00	8	46.02	10	46.00	Q
12	50	Evgeniy Mukhutdinov	Russia	47.35	15	46.06	11	46.06	Q
13	44	Danny Bourgeois	Canada	46.74	10	46.41	12	46.41	Q
14	58	Federico Ghezze	Italy	46.88	11	46.65	13	46.65	Q
15	40	Daisuke Watanabe	Japan	47.55	19	46.67	14	46.67	Q
16	39	Richard Rákoczy	Slovakia	46.97	13	47.06	15	46.97	Q
17	52	Woo Jin-yong	South Korea	47.06	14	47.24	17	47.06	Q
18	42	Kyle Wise	Great Britain	47.51	18	47.06	15	47.06	Q
19	56	Daniel Martínek	Czech Republic	47.48	17	47.36	18	47.36	Q
20	51	Giorgio Varesco	Italy	47.47	16	47.43	19	47.43	Q
21	47	Devon Graves	Canada	48.11	20	47.83	20	47.83	Q
22	41	Matej Bačo	Slovakia	DSQ		48.34	21	48.34	Q
23	60	Mal Prior	United States	48.99	21	48.65	22	48.65	Q
24	62	Thomas Graham	United States	49.24	22	50.84	25	49.24	Q
25	53	Petr Bohůnek	Czech Republic	49.31	23	49.43	23	49.31	Q
26	61	Owen Golden	United States	50.40	24	50.14	24	50.14	Q
27	63	Daniel Rosen	United States	51.69	25	51.29	26	51.29	Q
28	55	Richard Allen	Canada	52.66	27	1:03.32	28	52.66	Q
29	59	George Beattie	New Zealand	53.81	28	53.27	27	53.27	Q
	32	Kang Jong-won	South Korea	DNS		DNS		DNS	

== Elimination round ==
=== 1/8 finals ===
Heat 1

Rank	Bib	Name	Country	Notes
1	21	Nikolay Olyunin	Russia	
2	39	Woo Jin-yong	South Korea	
3	38	Richard Rákoczy	Slovakia	

Heat 2

Rank	Bib	Name	Country	Notes
1	29	Kevin Klossner	Switzerland	
2	28	Robin Ligeon	France	
3	46	Thomas Graham	United States	
4	47	Petr Bohůnek	Czech Republic	

Heat 3

Rank	Bib	Name	Country	Notes
1	25	Anton Koprivitsa	Russia	
2	34	Evgeniy Mukhutdinov	Russia	
3	43	Devon Graves	Canada	
	50	Richard Allen	Canada	DNS

Heat 4

Rank	Bib	Name	Country	Notes
1	24	Emil Novák	Czech Republic	
2	42	Giorgio Varesco	Italy	
3	35	Danny Bourgeois	Canada	
4	51	George Beattie	New Zealand	

Heat 5

Rank	Bib	Name	Country	Notes
1	23	Dawid Wal	Poland	
2	41	Daniel Martínek	Czech Republic	
3	36	Federico Ghezze	Italy	

Heat 6

Rank	Bib	Name	Country	Notes
1	33	Thomas Bankes	Great Britain	
2	44	Matej Bačo	Slovakia	
3	49	Daniel Rosen	United States	
4	26	Lukas Pachner	Austria	DNF

Heat 7

Rank	Bib	Name	Country	Notes
1	31	Leo Trespeuch	France	
2	27	Marcin Bocian	Poland	
3	45	Mal Prior	United States	
4	48	Owen Golden	United States	

Heat 8

Rank	Bib	Name	Country	Notes
1	22	Hanno Douschan	Austria	
2	37	Daisuke Watanabe	Japan	
3	40	Kyle Wise	Great Britain	

=== Quarterfinals ===
Heat 1

Rank	Bib	Name	Country	Notes
1	21	Nikolay Olyunin	Russia	
2	39	Woo Jin-yong	South Korea	
3	28	Robin Ligeon	France	
4	29	Kevin Klossner	Switzerland	

Heat 2

Rank	Bib	Name	Country	Notes
1	24	Emil Novák	Czech Republic	
2	25	Anton Koprivitsa	Russia	
3	34	Evgeniy Mukhutdinov	Russia	
4	42	Giorgio Varesco	Italy	

Heat 3

Rank	Bib	Name	Country	Notes
1	23	Dawid Wal	Poland	
2	33	Thomas Bankes	Great Britain	
3	41	Daniel Martínek	Czech Republic	
4	44	Matej Bačo	Slovakia	

Heat 4

Rank	Bib	Name	Country	Notes
1	22	Hanno Douschan	Austria	
2	31	Leo Trespeuch	France	
3	27	Marcin Bocian	Poland	
4	37	Daisuke Watanabe	Japan	

=== Semifinals ===
Heat 1

Rank	Bib	Name	Country	Notes
1	21	Nikolay Olyunin	Russia	
2	25	Anton Koprivitsa	Russia	
3	24	Emil Novák	Czech Republic	
4	39	Woo Jin-yong	South Korea	

Heat 2

Rank	Bib	Name	Country	Notes
1	22	Hanno Douschan	Austria	
2	31	Leo Trespeuch	France	
3	33	Thomas Bankes	Great Britain	
4	23	Dawid Wal	Poland	

=== Finals ===
==== Small Finals ====
Rank	Bib	Name	Country	Notes
5	23	Dawid Wal	Poland	
6	33	Thomas Bankes	Great Britain	
7	24	Emil Novák	Czech Republic	
8	39	Woo Jin-yong	South Korea	

==== Big Finals ====
Rank	Bib	Name	Country	Notes
1st place, gold medalist(s)	22	Hanno Douschan	Austria	
2nd place, silver medalist(s)	21	Nikolay Olyunin	Russia	
3rd place, bronze medalist(s)	31	Leo Trespeuch	France	
4	25	Anton Koprivitsa	Russia	
