= FIS Freestyle Ski and Snowboarding World Championships 2019 – Men's snowboard cross =

Men's snowboard cross at the FIS Freestyle Ski and Snowboarding World Championships 2019
- Venue: Solitude Mountain Resort
- Location: Utah, United States
- Dates: January 31 – February 1
- Competitors: 46 from 19 nations

Medalists
gold medal	Mick Dierdorff	United States
silver medal	Hanno Douschan	Austria
bronze medal	Emanuel Perathoner	Italy

The Men's snowboard cross competition at the FIS Freestyle Ski and Snowboarding World Championships 2019 was held on January 31 and February 1, 2019.

== Qualification ==
The qualification was started on January 31, at 09:40.

Rank	Bib	Name	Country	Run 1	Rank	Run 2	Rank	Best	Notes
1	11	Emanuel Perathoner	Italy	1:04.19	1			1:04.19	Q
2	7	Mick Dierdorff	United States	1:04.96	2			1:04.96	Q
3	10	Paul Berg	Germany	1:05.01	3			1:05.01	Q
4	9	Lucas Eguibar	Spain	1:05.16	4			1:05.16	Q
5	2	Alex Pullin	Australia	1:05.21	5			1:05.21	Q
6	1	Jake Vedder	United States	1:05.37	6			1:05.37	Q
7	8	Nate Holland	United States	1:05.40	7			1:05.40	Q
8	18	Nick Baumgartner	United States	1:05.58	8			1:05.58	Q
9	21	Ken Vuagnoux	France	1:05.68	9			1:05.68	Q
10	16	Hanno Douschan	Austria	1:05.88	10			1:05.88	Q
11	24	Lukas Pachner	Austria	1:06.08	11			1:06.08	Q
12	40	Lluís Marin Tarroch	Andorra	1:06.15	12			1:06.15	Q
13	30	Éliot Grondin	Canada	1:06.31	13			1:06.31	Q
14	13	Martin Nörl	Germany	1:06.34	14			1:06.34	Q
15	37	Loan Bozzolo	France	1:06.35	15			1:06.35	Q
16	4	Regino Hernández	Spain	1:06.44	16			1:06.44	Q
17	6	Adam Lambert	Australia	1:06.71	20	1:05.19	1	1:05.19	q
18	3	Omar Visintin	Italy	1:07.17	27	1:05.55	2	1:05.55	q
19	17	Konstantin Schad	Germany	1:06.89	24	1:06.03	3	1:06.03	q
20	20	Baptiste Brochu	Canada	1:06.80	21	1:06.11	4	1:06.11	q
21	19	Kevin Hill	Canada	1:06.85	22	1:06.15	5	1:06.15	q
22	36	Yoshiki Takahara	Japan	1:06.51	17	1:06.38	6	1:06.38	q
23	14	Alessandro Hämmerle	Austria	1:06.62	18	1:06.38	6	1:06.38	q
24	27	Leon Beckhaus	Germany	1:07.01	26	1:06.43	8	1:06.43	q
25	34	Anton Lindfors	Finland	1:07.95	34	1:06.55	9	1:06.55	q
26	29	Kalle Koblet	Switzerland	DNF		1:06.67	10	1:06.67	q
27	25	Cameron Bolton	Australia	1:06.68	19	1:08.63	24	1:06.68	q
28	35	Nick Watter	Switzerland	1:07.36	29	1:06.69	11	1:06.69	q
29	12	Michele Godino	Italy	1:07.91	33	1:06.69	11	1:06.69	q
30	39	Shinya Momono	Japan	1:06.87	23	1:06.78	13	1:06.78	q
31	36	Fabio Cordi	Italy	1:06.95	25	1:06.87	14	1:06.87	q
32	38	Steven Williams	Argentina	1:07.82	32	1:06.94	15	1:06.94	q
33	23	Glenn de Blois	Netherlands	1:07.40	30	1:07.03	16	1:07.03	
34	22	Merlin Surget	France	1:07.63	31	1:07.17	17	1:07.17	
35	5	Jarryd Hughes	Australia	1:07.23	28	1:07.70	21	1:07.23	
36	28	Luca Hämmerle	Austria	1:08.01	35	1:07.37	18	1:07.37	
37	31	Jérôme Lymann	Switzerland	1:18.75	43	1:07.49	19	1:07.49	
38	42	Woo Jin	South Korea	1:08.58	36	1:07.55	20	1:07.55	
39	32	Jan Kubičík	Czech Republic	1:08.90	40	1:08.55	22	1:08.55	
40	33	Danny Bourgeois	Canada	1:08.59	37	1:08.63	24	1:08.59	
41	44	Daniil Dilman	Russia	1:08.69	38	1:08.62	23	1:08.62	
42	47	Geza Kinda	Romania	1:08.84	39	1:09.00	26	1:08.84	
43	45	Jakub Žerava	Czech Republic	1:09.83	42	1:09.64	27	1:09.64	
44	43	Radek Vintr	Czech Republic	1:09.78	41	1:10.22	28	1:09.78	
45	41	Matouš Koudelka	Czech Republic	1:21.47	45	1:16.33	29	1:16.33	
46	46	Victor-Segundo Chávez	Peru	1:19.04	44	1:34.09	30	1:19.04	
—	15	Pierre Vaultier	France	Did not start					

== Elimination round ==
The top 32 qualifiers advanced to the 1/8 finals. From here, they participated in four-person elimination races, with the top two from each race advancing.

=== 1/8 Finals ===
Heat 1

Rank	Bib	Name	Country	Notes
1	1	Emanuel Perathoner	Italy	Q
2	17	Adam Lambert	Australia	Q
3	32	Steven Williams	Argentina	
4	16	Regino Hernández	Spain	

Heat 3

Rank	Bib	Name	Country	Notes
1	5	Alex Pullin	Australia	Q
2	12	Lluís Marin Tarroch	Andorra	Q
3	28	Nick Watter	Switzerland	
4	21	Kevin Hill	Canada	

Heat 5

Rank	Bib	Name	Country	Notes
1	3	Paul Berg	Germany	Q
2	30	Shinya Momono	Japan	Q
3	19	Konstantin Schad	Germany	
4	14	Martin Nörl	Germany	

Heat 7

Rank	Bib	Name	Country	Notes
1	10	Hanno Douschan	Austria	Q
2	23	Alessandro Hämmerle	Austria	Q
3	7	Nate Holland	United States	
4	26	Kalle Koblet	Switzerland	

Heat 2

Rank	Bib	Name	Country	Notes
1	8	Nick Baumgartner	United States	Q
2	24	Leon Beckhaus	Germany	Q
3	25	Anton Lindfors	Finland	
—	9	Ken Vuagnoux	France	DNF

Heat 4

Rank	Bib	Name	Country	Notes
1	4	Lucas Eguibar	Spain	Q
2	20	Baptiste Brochu	Canada	Q
3	29	Michele Godino	Italy	
—	13	Éliot Grondin	Canada	DNF

Heat 6

Rank	Bib	Name	Country	Notes
1	6	Jake Vedder	United States	Q
2	22	Yoshiki Takahara	Japan	Q
3	27	Cameron Bolton	Australia	
4	11	Lukas Pachner	Austria	

Heat 8

Rank	Bib	Name	Country	Notes
1	2	Mick Dierdorff	United States	Q
2	15	Loan Bozzolo	France	Q
3	18	Omar Visintin	Italy	
4	31	Fabio Cordi	Italy	

=== Quarterfinals ===
Heat 1

Rank	Bib	Name	Country	Notes
1	1	Emanuel Perathoner	Italy	Q
2	24	Leon Beckhaus	Germany	Q
3	17	Adam Lambert	Australia	
4	8	Nick Baumgartner	United States	

Heat 3

Rank	Bib	Name	Country	Notes
1	6	Jake Vedder	United States	Q
2	3	Paul Berg	Germany	Q
3	30	Shinya Momono	Japan	
4	22	Yoshiki Takahara	Japan	

Heat 2

Rank	Bib	Name	Country	Notes
1	4	Lucas Eguibar	Spain	Q
2	20	Baptiste Brochu	Canada	Q
3	5	Alex Pullin	Australia	
—	12	Lluis Marin Tarroch	Andorra	DNF

Heat 4

Rank	Bib	Name	Country	Notes
1	2	Mick Dierdorff	United States	Q
2	10	Hanno Douschan	Austria	Q
3	15	Loan Bozzolo	France	
4	23	Alessandro Hämmerle	Austria	

=== Semifinals ===
Heat 1

Rank	Bib	Name	Country	Notes
1	1	Emanuel Perathoner	Italy	Q
2	4	Lucas Eguibar	Spain	Q
3	24	Leon Beckhaus	Germany	
—	20	Baptiste Brochu	Canada	DNF

Heat 2

Rank	Bib	Name	Country	Notes
1	2	Mick Dierdorff	United States	Q
2	10	Hanno Douschan	Austria	Q
3	6	Jake Vedder	United States	
4	3	Paul Berg	Germany	

=== Finals ===
==== Small final ====
Rank	Bib	Name	Country	Notes
5	6	Jake Vedder	United States	
6	20	Baptiste Brochu	Canada	
7	3	Paul Berg	Germany	
8	24	Leon Beckhaus	Germany	

==== Big final ====
Rank	Bib	Name	Country	Notes
1st place, gold medalist(s)	2	Mick Dierdorff	United States	
2nd place, silver medalist(s)	10	Hanno Douschan	Austria	
3rd place, bronze medalist(s)	1	Emanuel Perathoner	Italy	
4	4	Lucas Eguibar	Spain	
