= FIS Freestyle Ski and Snowboarding World Championships 2017 – Men's snowboard team cross =

The men's snowboard team cross competition of the FIS Freestyle Ski and Snowboarding World Championships 2017 was held at Sierra Nevada, Spain on March 13. 30 athletes from 11 countries competed.

== Elimination round ==
The following are the results of the elimination round.

=== Quarterfinals ===
Heat 1

Rank	Bib	Name	Country	Notes
1	8	Lucas Eguibar; Regino Hernandez	Spain	Q
2	9	Lukas Pachner; Julian Lueftner	Austria	Q
3	1	Alex Pullin; Adam Lambert	Australia	

Heat 2

Rank	Bib	Name	Country	Notes
1	5	Loan Bozzolo; Pierre Vaultier	France	Q
2	4	Hagen Kearney; Nick Baumgartner	United States	Q
3	12	Paul Berg; Martin Noerl	Germany	
4	13	Steven Williams; Simon White	Argentina	

Heat 3

Rank	Bib	Name	Country	Notes
1	6	Kevin Hill; Christopher Robanske	Canada	Q
2	3	Markus Schairer; Alessandro Hämmerle	Austria	Q
3	11	Andrey Anisimov; Aleksandr Guzachev	Russia	
DSQ	14	Leon Beckhaus; Sebastian Pietrzykowski	Germany	

Heat 4

Rank	Bib	Name	Country	Notes
1	7	Alex Deibold; Nate Holland	United States	Q
2	15	Glenn De Bois; Karel Van Goor	Netherlands	Q
3	2	Luca Matteotti; Omar Visintin	Italy	
DNF	10	Tommaso Leoni; Emanuel Perathoner	Italy	

=== Semifinals ===
Heat 1

Rank	Bib	Name	Country	Notes
1	8	Lucas Eguibar; Regino Hernandez	Spain	Q
2	4	Hagen Kearney; Nick Baumgartner	United States	Q
3	9	Lukas Pachner; Julian Lueftner	Austria	
4	5	Loan Bozzolo; Pierre Vaultier	France	

Heat 2

Rank	Bib	Name	Country	Notes
1	6	Kevin Hill; Christopher Robanske	Canada	Q
2	3	Markus Schairer; Alessandro Hämmerle	Austria	Q
3	7	Alex Deibold; Nate Holland	United States	
4	15	Glenn De Bois; Karel Van Goor	Netherlands	

=== Finals ===
==== Small Finals ====
Rank	Bib	Name	Country	Notes
5	5	Loan Bozzolo; Pierre Vaultier	France	
6	9	Lukas Pachner; Julian Lueftner	Austria	
7	7	Alex Deibold; Nate Holland	United States	
8	15	Glenn De Bois; Karel Van Goor	Netherlands	

==== Big Finals ====
Rank	Bib	Name	Country	Notes
1st place, gold medalist(s)	4	Hagen Kearney; Nick Baumgartner	United States	
2nd place, silver medalist(s)	8	Lucas Eguibar; Regino Hernandez	Spain	
3rd place, bronze medalist(s)	6	Kevin Hill; Christopher Robanske	Canada	
4	3	Markus Schairer; Alessandro Hämmerle	Austria	
