= Kevin Hill =

Kevin Hill may refer to:

- Kevin Hill (TV series), a TV series on UPN
- Kevin Hill (footballer), English association football player
- Kevin Hill (snowboarder), Canadian snowboarder
