= A Fox's Tale =

2008 animated film directed by György Gát

- Hungarian theatrical release poster
- Directed by: György Gát; János Uzsák
- Written by: Péter Dóka; István Fekete (characters); György Gát
- Produced by: Zsófia Kende; Wolf Laszlo; Stephen Malit; Melvyn Singer; Kornél Sipos
- Starring: Freddie Highmore; Miranda Richardson; Bill Nighy; Sienna Miller; Clemency Burton-Hill; Matthew McNulty
- Music by: Krisztián Som; Mike Moran
- Production company: DYN Entertainment
- Distributed by: Budapest Film Rt. Fantastic Films Int.
- Release date: 17 April 2008 (Hungary)
- Running time: 85 minutes
- Countries: Hungary; United Kingdom
- Languages: English; Hungarian
- Budget: 1.4 million Ft
- Box office: $160,658

A Fox's Tale is a 2008 animated film. The film's original Hungarian title is Kis Vuk ("Little Vuk"). It is the sequel to the 1981 film The Little Fox (Hungarian title: "Vuk").

It was theatrically released in Hungary on April 17, 2008 and in the United States in late 2009.

For 10 years, the English dub of the film was never officially released to the general public as it was unavailable, with the only publicly released media to feature the English dub being the international trailer, until it was uploaded on YouTube on March 9, 2017 by its director György Gát, particularly due to the mass popularity of one of its actresses Sienna Miller had following her critically acclaimed roles in Foxcatcher, American Sniper, and High-Rise.

== Plot ==
The animated film is about Little Jack, a red fox kit who spends his time enjoying a wonderful life in the forest with his loving family. During the film, Little Jack's world changes drastically when his father, Jack, is captured and forced to join the circus. The film's villain, a shrewd circus owner named Anna Conda, desperately wants bigger and better performances. This leads her to kidnap many forest animals, including Little Jack's father. With the help of her magician husband, The Ringmaster, Anna is able to hypnotize the animals into performing in her shows.

On his rescue mission, Little Jack gets help from many unlikely heroes, including a incapacitated nature-loving boy named Alex and a young acrobat named Arabella. Little Jack's mission to rescue his father leads him to make new friends, including a circus fox named Darcey. Together, they set out to free the animals so they can return home to the beautiful forest.

== Cast ==
=== Hungarian ===
Character	Voice
Vuk (fox)	Gálvölgyi János
Kis Vuk (fox)	Csőre Gábor
Alex	Simonyi Balázs
Carmella	Gubás Gabi
Arcadona	Borbás Gabi
Arthur (director)	Reviczky Gábor
Doki	Kulka János
Erdőmester	Bodrogi Gyula
Balfék	Besenczi Árpád
Jobbfék	Forgács Gábor
Íbisz (fox)	Román Judit
Csimpi (ape)	Dörner György
Tóbi (lion)	János Papp
Igor (bear)	Szabó Győző
Fuxné (silver fox)	Sáfár Anikó
Tib (silver fox)	Kerekes József
Kár-Kár (raven)	Ganxsta Zolee
Csitt (bulldog)	Pálfai Péter
Csatt (Basset Hound)	Bácskai János
Sut (tailless fox)	Versényi László
Csele (fox)	Kocsis Judit
Papa Rabbit	Mikó István
Folti	Molnár Levente (1st voice); Bolba Tamás (2nd voice)
Fat bunny	Bodrogi Attila
Kello (rabbit)	Pápai Erika
Doris (snake)	Molnár Piroska
Little silver fox	Bálint Sugárka
Fox cub	Vadász Bea
Zizi (horse)	Halász Aranka
Tupi (fox)	Fekete Zoltán
Wild boar	Albert Péter
Deer	Bolla Róbert
Weasels	Józsa Imre
Fat hunter	Ujlaki Dénes
Fat mom	Simon Eszter
Bald dad	Németh Gábor

Other Hungarian voices: Borbíró András, Jelinek Márk, Rátonyi Hajni

=== English ===
- Freddie Highmore as Little Jack
- Miranda Richardson as Anna Conda
- Bill Nighy as the Ringmaster
- Sienna Miller as Darcey
- Clemency Burton-Hill as Annabella
- Matthew McNulty as Alex
- Phil Davis as Jack
- Andrea Grant as Caw Caw
- Rupert Degas as Rufus, Ché, Dizzy
- David Holt as Doofus, Knuckles
- Jimmy Hibbert as Toby, Buster
- Brian Bowles as Stubbs, Forest Ranger
- Timothy Bentinck as Papa Rabbit, Igor, Tibs, Colonel
- Eve Karpf as Trixie, Madame Renard, Doris
- Sean Barrett as Doctor Stan
- Olivia Chambelain as Tuffy Rabbit, Carla Renard
- Leopold Benedict as Patch Rabbit, Little Timmy

== Reception ==
The film became controversial for the extremely negative criticism from its Hungarian audience, which was mainly disappointed by the film's failure to capture the style and spirit of the original 1981 film.
