= Görbe =

Görbe is a surname. Notable people with the surname include:

- János Görbe (1912–1968), Hungarian actor
- Nóra Görbe (born 1956), Hungarian singer and actress, daughter of János
