= Köves =

Köves is a Hungarian language surname from the Hungarian word for "stony". Notable people with the surname include:

- Csaba Köves (1966–2025), Hungarian fencer
- Gábor Köves (born 1970), Hungarian tennis player
- József Köves (born 1938), Hungarian writer
- Nóra Köves (born 1971), Hungarian tennis player
- Slomó Köves (born 1979), Hungarian rabbi
