= István Edőcs =

Hungarian boxer (1941–1984)

Personal information
- Nationality: Hungarian
- Born: 19 March 1941 Budapest, Hungary
- Died: 21 January 1984 (aged 42) Budapest, Hungary
- Height: 178 cm (5 ft 10 in)

Boxing career
- Weight class: Middleweight; Light heavyweight Heavyweight

István Edőcs (Hungarian: Edőcs István; 19 March 1941 – 21 January 1984) was a Hungarian amateur boxer and boxing coach. He won three Hungarian national titles, in three different weight classes, and represented Hungary at two European Amateur Boxing Championships.

Edőcs competed for twenty-five years, boxing for Vasas SC from 1955 to 1966 and for Újpesti Dózsa from 1967 to 1983. He was national champion as a middleweight in 1962, as a light heavyweight in 1964 and as a heavyweight in 1968, reached the quarter-finals of the 1965 European Championships, and won the heavyweight division of the Hungarian People's Republic Cup in 1973.

He is best remembered in Hungary for a 1975 bout against the Cuban triple Olympic and world champion Teófilo Stevenson: after three Hungarian boxers had withdrawn from the fight, Edőcs volunteered from the spectators' stand to take it. A boxing club and a memorial plaque in the Rákospalota district of Budapest bear his name.

== Career ==
=== Vasas (1955–1966) ===
Edőcs was born in Budapest on 19 March 1941 and took up boxing in 1955, at the age of fourteen, with Vasas SC, where he remained until 1966. A carpenter by trade, he also worked as a bouncer at a bar on Szent István körút during his competitive years.

Competing as a light heavyweight (81 kg), he reached the quarter-finals of the 1961 Hungarian championships. He moved down one weight class the following year and, in 1962, won his first national title as a middleweight (75 kg). He took a second national title at the championships held in Budapest on 20–22 March 1964, this time at light heavyweight, finishing ahead of Surány.

The Vasas club history names Edőcs, alongside the four-time national champion flyweight Gusztáv Junghaus, as one of the two outstanding figures of its boxing section in the early and mid-1960s.

==== 1965 European Championships ====
Edőcs made his international debut against Bulgaria in 1959. He travelled to the European Championships held in East Berlin on 22–29 May 1965 as a two-time national champion and six-time international, aged 24 and standing 178 cm tall. In the light heavyweight preliminaries he beat Hikmet Coşkunoğlu of Turkey on points, but lost the quarter-final by third-round technical knockout to Danas Pozniakas of the Soviet Union, who went on to win the division — and the Olympic title three years later.

=== Újpesti Dózsa (1967–1983) ===
In 1967 Edőcs joined Újpesti Dózsa, for whom he continued to compete until 1983. He was still boxing at light heavyweight in 1967, but from 1968 competed as a heavyweight (+81 kg).

He won his third and final Hungarian title at the championships of 24–26 May 1968, beating Budai in the heavyweight final; he had also won the Budapest championship that March. In 1970 he entered the national heavyweight final as the clear favourite but was beaten by Lajos Juhász.

==== 1973: European Championships, national final and cup win ====
In June 1973 Edőcs boxed at heavyweight at the European Championships in Belgrade. On 5 June he lost his opening bout by unanimous decision (5:0) to Ion Alexe of Romania, who went on to meet the eventual champion Viktor Ulyanich.

At the jubilee 50th Hungarian championships in October that year he again reached the heavyweight final, losing on points to Réder of Tatabánya. He gained his revenge on 17 December 1973 at the closing gala of the Hungarian People's Republic Cup (MNK) in the Budapest Sportcsarnok, beating Réder on points after his opponent took a count of eight in the final minute.

==== Bout with Teófilo Stevenson (1975) ====
On 29 March 1975 the Cuban heavyweight Teófilo Stevenson appeared at the Honvéd Liberation Cup in Budapest. According to contemporary reports, three Hungarian boxers scheduled to meet him withdrew at short notice citing sudden injuries, leaving the organisers facing the prospect of Stevenson reaching the final without fighting. Edőcs, then 33 years old and described by the newspaper Hétfői Hírek as "going to seed", volunteered from the stand to face him.

The bout lasted only two and a half minutes, during which Edőcs was given the count twice, but the crowd gave him a standing ovation. The magazine Képes Sport reported that Stevenson floored him with a body shot, after which Edőcs rose and fought on. The Vasas club history records that he had "to expect a serious beating", but "took less than expected, and drew a greater ovation than the Caribbean giant". Stevenson spent a total of four minutes in the ring over the whole tournament. The writer Béla Abody devoted a passage to the fight in his 1982 sports book Kesztyűs kézzel.

=== Later career ===
Edőcs was among the oldest competitors in the Hungarian ranks in the second half of the 1970s: he was still boxing at heavyweight aged 35 in 1976, and in 1977 was preparing for his twenty-fourth competitive season. At the 1974 national championships he received the award for the most technical boxer of the tournament. He was a member of a Hungarian team-championship-winning side in 1977, and bowed out of competition in 1978, taking a national bronze medal at the age of 37.

=== Coaching ===
In 1971 Edőcs obtained a boxing coach's diploma from the further-training institute of the Hungarian College of Physical Education (TFTI). Among those he trained was Kálmán Buga, who later founded the Rákospalota club named after him.

== Film work ==
During the 1980s Edőcs appeared as an extra and worked as a stunt performer in popular Hungarian films and television productions, among them the series Linda. Hungarian film databases credit him with roles in Talpuk alatt fütyül a szél (1976), Hívójel (1980) and Kopaszkutya (1981).

== Death and legacy ==
Edőcs died unexpectedly in Budapest on 21 January 1984, in his 43rd year. The daily Népsport described him in its obituary as a "many-times capped international, multiple individual champion and MNK winner", while Képes Sport remembered him as "the sport's beloved Falstaff". He is buried in the Óbuda Cemetery.

The István Edőcs Boxing Club in the Rákospalota district of Budapest's 15th arrondissement is named after him: it was founded in the mid-2000s by his former pupil Kálmán Buga together with the coach Gyula Csóka, with the permission of Edőcs's family. A memorial plaque to him was also erected in Rákospalota.

== Honours ==
- Hungarian national champion — middleweight (75 kg): 1962; light heavyweight (81 kg): 1964; heavyweight (+81 kg): 1968
- Hungarian national championship runner-up — heavyweight: 1970, 1973
- Hungarian People's Republic Cup (MNK) winner — heavyweight: 1973
- Budapest champion — heavyweight: 1968
- Hungarian team championship: 1977
- European Championships — quarter-finalist, light heavyweight, 1965; competitor, heavyweight, 1973
