= Brochu =

Brochu is a surname. Notable people with the surname include:

- André Brochu (born 1942), professor, poet, novelist and essayist from Quebec
- Baptiste Brochu (born 1989), Canadian snowboarder
- Claude Brochu (born 1944), Canadian businessman, former president of the Montreal Expos
- Daniel Brochu, Canadian actor
- Don Brochu, American film editor
- Doug Brochu, American actor
- Evelyne Brochu (born 1983), Canadian film, television and theatre actress
- Lysette Brochu (born 1946), Canadian writer
- Martin Brochu (born 1973), Canadian ice hockey player
- Paul Brochu, drummer from Quebec, member of UZEB
- Pierre Brochu, (1795–1871), Canadian settler, first inhabitant of the Matapedia Valley
- Sophie Brochu (born 1963), Canadian economist and businesswoman
- Yvon Brochu, (born 1949), Quebec writer

== Toponyms ==
- Brochu Lake, a body of water in the south-eastern part of the Gouin Reservoir in La Tuque Quebec, Canada
