= György Gát =

Hungarian television director and producer (1947–2024)

- Born: 5 February 1947; Budapest, Hungary
- Died: 13 March 2024 (aged 77)
- Occupations: Actor; director
- Spouse: Nóra Görbe (1976–1992)

György Gát (5 February 1947 – 13 March 2024), sometimes credited as George Gat, was a Hungarian television director and producer. He was also a regular lecturer at ELTE University in Budapest.

== Biography ==
György Gát was born in Budapest on 5 February 1947. Gát's first hit was the crime-comedy TV series Linda (1984–1989). Linda starred his wife Nóra Görbe.

It was during the pre-production of "Linda" that Gát became Hungary's first independent television producer – a position that at the time the regime did not acknowledge.

Gát subsequently created series "Angyalbőrben" (1990–1991), "Familia Kft." (1991–1997), "TV a város szélén" (1998), "SztárVár" (2005) and the animated series "Szerencsi fel!" (2004).

In 2008 he co-wrote and co-directed a sequel to animated movie Vuk, called "A Kis Vuk" (in English: A Fox's Tale).

Gát had two children with Görbe, Anna (b. 1983) and Márton (b. 1989). He died on 13 March 2024, at the age of 77.
