= Gölle =

- Village
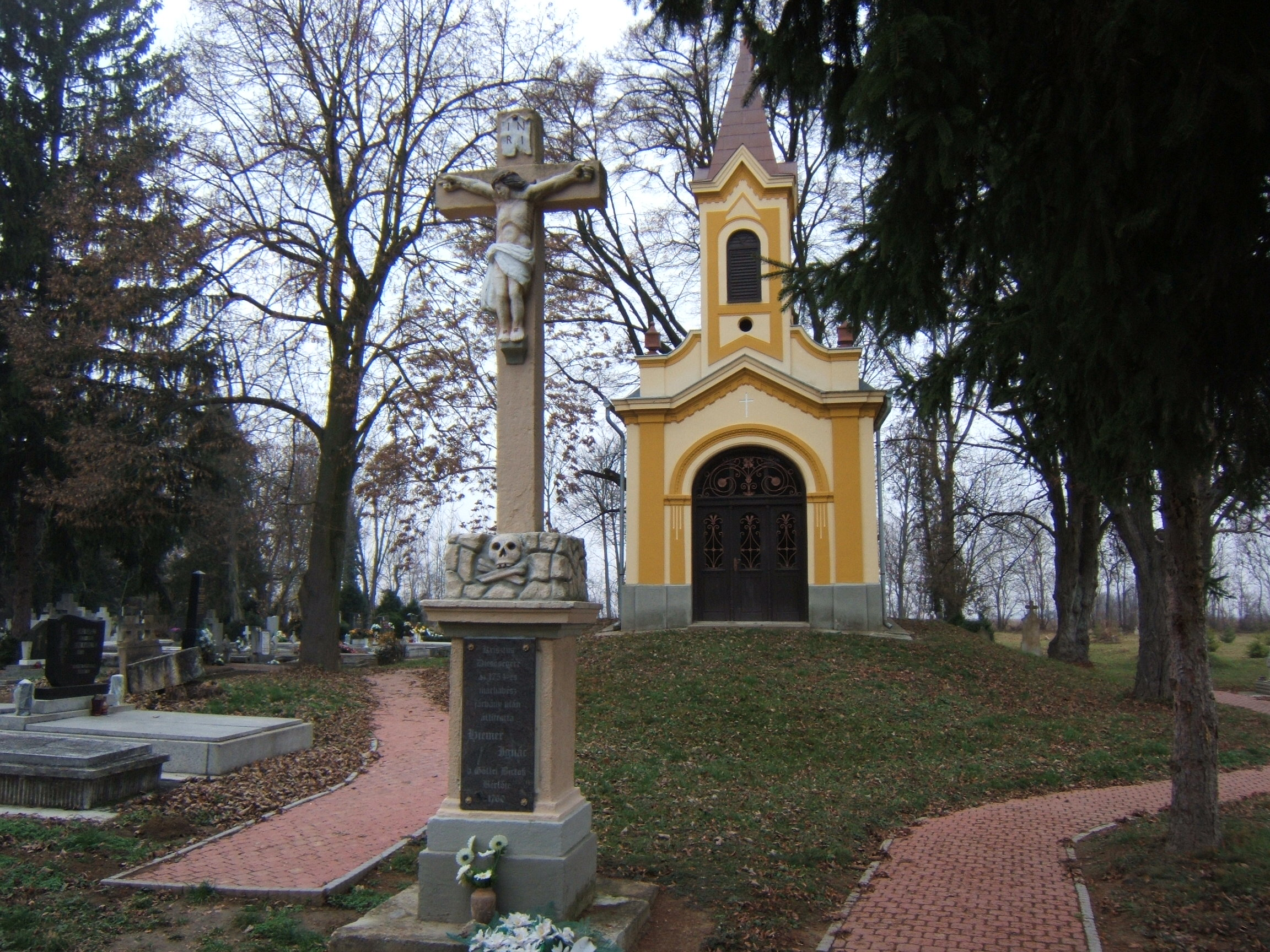
- Cross and cemetery chapel in Gölle

- Coat of arms

- Location of Somogy county in Hungary

- Location of Gölle
- Coordinates: 46.43485°N 18.01359°E
- Country: Hungary
- Region: Southern Transdanubia
- County: Somogy
- District: Kaposvár
- RC Diocese: Kaposvár

Area
  - Total: 44.69 km^{2} (17.25 sq mi)

Population (2017)
  - Total: 872
  - Density: 19.5/km^{2} (50.5/sq mi)
- Demonym: göllei
- Time zone: UTC+1 (CET)
  - Summer (DST): UTC+2 (CEST)
- Postal code: 7272
- Area code: (+36) 82
- NUTS 3 code: HU232
- MP: Mihály Witzmann (Fidesz)
- Website: Gölle Online

Gölle is a village in Somogy county, Hungary.

== Notable people ==
- István Fekete (1900–1970), Hungarian novelist of juvenile literature
