= Vuk (novel) =

1965 novel by István Fekete

- First edition
- Author: István Fekete
- Language: Hungarian
- Publisher: Mora Konyvkiado
- Publication date: 1965
- Publication place: Hungary
- Pages: 87

Vuk is a 1965 children's novel by Hungarian writer István Fekete about the life of a young red fox.

== Plot ==
Vuk and his brothers and sisters are born near the pond one spring. Their father Kag and their mother Iny have to hunt continuously to get enough food to feed them. Then the Ranger finds the fox's home and sends in dogs to destroy the foxes that have been stealing from the village farmyards. The fox parents manage to save only one of their children: Vuk, who is left by the pond out of danger.

It is not long before the frightened Vuk is found by Karak his uncle who takes the little fox under his care and takes him to his cave in the cliffs to teach him the ways of the forest. Vuk learns quickly and soon becomes one of the greatest foxes in the wood.

Vuk also learns that the smooth-skin Ranger is responsible for the murder of his parents, and he plans to take revenge on him. When he visits the Ranger's house, he finds his sister who has survived and is held there in a cage. Karak and Vuk help her escape and she joins them alongside the other Free Nations in the woods.

At harvest time the foxes are almost caught because they are betrayed by the swallows and other birds. It is only Vuk's cleverness and cunning that saves them. But during the hunting season Karak falls victim to a Smooth-skin's gun so only Vuk and his sister return to live in Karak's cave alone.

Winter comes and they both feel the need to look for partners. Vuk's sister is the first to find a partner and she goes to live with him. Then Vuk fights off another fox to win a beautiful vixen bride called Csele, and the cycle of love and life begins again.

== Film adaptation ==
The novel was adapted into a very popular animated film in 1981.
