= Alfred Soultan =

Hungarian writer (born 1976)

Alfred Soultan (born 1976) is a Hungarian playwright, screenwriter, poet, and critic currently living in the United States.

== Theatrical Works ==
- Alone, Amongst Thousands ("Magamban, ezerek között") - poems
- The Griffin-Licence ("A griff-licenc") - satire in two acts based on the short novel of Jozsef Koves
- The Doll ("A baba") - tragedy in two acts
- Animal World ("Állatvilág") - play; obscene pathos for the 20th century
- Dawning Aurora ("Derengő Hajnal") stage play in two acts based on Amongst Humans by István Fekete
- Marionette Short Story ("Marionett novella") tragicomedy based on the works of Jozsef Koves

== Movie Productions ==
- The Violin (executive producer)
- Oy Vey! My Son Is Gay! (executive producer, creative consultant)
- Father Fabulous (director, producer, writer)
- Music video for Live the Dream by Lori Carpenter (executive producer)
- The Bondage (executive producer, story consultant, editor)

== Novels and screenplays ==
He currently has a 7 figure deal for developing original screenplays for independent features, animated features, and high budget feature movies.

- Camp Tales ("Tábori történetek") - thematic collection of short stories
- Bluechkin ("Szomoronc") - a tale
- It Was Not Easy to Get You ("Nem volt könnyű megszereznem téged") - a novel
- Heavenly Voices ("Mennyei hangok") - screenplay; a comedy
- The Hermit ("A remete") - opera libretto
- Scott ("Scott") - novel, then screenplay trilogy
- CASFAP ("MESZOVE") - tragicomedy in two parts
- Spade, Hoe, Hammer ("Ásó, kapa, kalapács") - a novel
- She is a Conversationalist ("A társalkodónő") - a novel
- One Week Beats Eternity ("Egy hét a világ") - a novel
- Vesperal Loneliness ("Esteli magány") - poems
- Sherman Valentine ("Sherman Valentine") - a novel
- Tropical Fish House ("Trópusi díszhal ház") - a novel
- The Snow Queen ("A hókirálynő") - screenplay for animated feature
- Letter Novel ("Levélregény") - novel and screenplay
- The Three Musketeers ("A három testőr") - screenplay

== Awards ==
- First Prize - National Literary Competition - Hajdúböszörmény, June 11, 1993
- First Prize - Literary Competition - Debrecen, November 22, 1993

== Sources ==
- City Library of Tiszafüred
- 1997 Blog Entry
- 1997 Blog Entry quoting his poem on celibacy
- Hungarian National Theatre
