= Linda (TV series) =

- Genre: Action; Adventure
- Written by: György Gát; András Polgár (1984–1986); Ádám Rozgonyi (1986–1990)
- Story by: István Kállai
- Directed by: György Gát; Miklós Szurdi (1989–1990)
- Starring: Nóra Görbe; Béla Szerednyey; Gyula Bodrogi; Ildikó Pécsi; Gábor Deme (1983); Tamás Vayer; Gábor Harsányi; Péter Balázs; Mária Ronyecz; György Bánffy; Katalin Lukácsy; Béla Romwalter; Ottó Elek Jr.
- Voices of: Miklós Tolnai; Péter Beregi; András Várkonyi
- Theme music composer: György Vukán
- Composers: György Vukán; Robert Szikora
- Country of origin: Hungary
- Original language: Hungarian
- No. of seasons: 4
- No. of episodes: 22

Production
- Producer: György Gát
- Cinematography: Emil Novák; Buda Gulyás; Károly Boldizsár; Gábor Szabó; András Szalai
- Animator: Péter Kozma
- Editors: Mari Miklós; Júlia Kende; Mária Fellegi; Ágnes Ostoros
- Running time: 55–66 minutes

Original release
- Network: Magyar Televízió
- Release: 2 November 1984 – 24 March 1990
- Network: M1
- Release: 19 March – 26 March 2002

Linda is a Hungarian action adventure series that aired on Hungarian television from 1984–1989 and was created by György Gát.

The first season was broadcast by Magyar Televízió from 1984, the second from 1986, and the third from 1989. Between 1984 and 1987 10 parts were made, and between 1987 and 1991 7 parts. At that time, already two manufacturers were involved, as in the beginning Mafilm, and later Tele P-Art Production Office, joined. A second series was also made ata later time. The 5 episodes of the second series were shot between 1999 and 2000. Its genre can be described as crime comedy. The TV film series was produced by Hungarian Television and Tele P-Art, and was released on DVD by Budapest Film.

Its director is György Gát, in the third season he directed the episodes together with Miklós Szurdi. The main roles are played by Nóra Görbe, Béla Szerednyey, Gyula Bodrogi and Ildikó Pécsi. More and more generations are growing up with the series, and its popularity remains strong. The newer parts presented in 2002, unlike the older episodes, form a continuous storyline. However, this series was not as huge a success as the 1980s version of Linda .

In 1986, the screenwriters of the series – András Coper, György Gát and Ádám Rozgonyi – published a novel entitled Linda Safari. This story has not been filmed, only existing in the form of a book. Its main characters are characters from the film. Linda is sent to Vienna, this time for further training, but before she leaves, she finds a corpse and then gets involved in an international crime investigation throughout the story.

Linda also appeared as a comic book series in Pajtás(Companion), the magazine of the pioneer movement. In the story, one of the professors of the KFKI (Central Physics Research Institute) commits crimes, but when Linda is about to capture him, the scientist pushes her into a time machine on the site of the institute, sending her back to the era of Louis XIV., where Linda meets Dumas' three musketeers, Athos, Porthos and Aramis. The story was interrupted here, as the story couldn't be continued and wasn't a success among readers either.

The broadcasting rights to the film were also purchased by two commercial channels: it ran on RTL Klub in 1999, was repeated by M1 in 2003, was broadcast by Viasat 3 from 2005, and shown again on M1 from the end of August 2008. It was screened on M2 in summer 2010 and on M1 in 2011.

Between 2012 and 2015, the 17 + 5 part was broadcast by Duna Television and Duna World, and from the summer of 2015 by M3.

The first two seasons were also released in DVD format, with 2 episodes per disc.

In January 2013, Origo.hu reported that director Martin Csaba planned to make a film titled Linda Returns, but this did not materialize.

== Plot ==
Linda Veszprémi, a graduate high school girl, decides to become a police officer. However, her family doesn't consider this profession a good choice: Her father and teachers would prefer to see her as a biologist or researcher, and her classmates regularly mock her for her obsession, but she does not care about them anyway. Tamás Emődi, one of her classmates, fancies Linda and courts her. She doesn't appear to take notice, but one time her father remarks to Tamás, "she's constantly reading your stupid love poems."

Linda's first successful case starts at school, neutralizing a “satyr” spying after her classmate, followed by a brilliant investigation revealing the real father of her classmate.

Later she serves in traffic police and, after rising in the ranks, becomes a junior lieutenant alongside Gábor Eősze. Her boss, however, is not happy about the overly enthusiastic girl, who seems to want to get into trouble. Eősze will do everything he can to keep Linda away from more serious cases, entrusting her with simple tasks. He is very strict, but this is rather motivated by a sense of concern, because he doesn't want the girl to get in trouble. However, Linda, whether willingly or unintentionally, keeps encountering serious crimes, also involving aberrant individuals, so her boss's concerns are also justified. They are regularly deploying her for additional training courses for peace of mind, yet without much success, since Linda constantly gets involved in spectacular fights. The detective girl stumbles upon a variety of crimes: art robbery, mafia cases, serial murders, but the inventive, combative and clever girl is able to solve them all. In addition to the mysterious crimes, the general mood is elated by Linda's impressive taekwondo knowledge, and even the comic and captivating portrayal of both her father Béla Veszprémi and her magnanimous friend Klára, as well as of Linda's taxi-driving fiancé, the often unlucky Tamás, who keeps striving to rise to her level.

== Cast ==
- Nóra Görbe as Linda Veszprémi
- Béla Szerednyey as Tamás Emődi
- Gyula Bodrogi as Béla Veszprémi
- Ildikó Pécsi as Klára Steinbach
- Gábor Deme as Gábor Eősze (pilot episodes)
- Vayer Tamás (voice dubbed by Miklós Tolnai) as Gábor Eősze (1986-1990)
- Gábor Harsányi as Gyula Handel
- Péter Balázs as Bosó/Zoltán Kő
- Mária Ronyecz as Bagoly
- György Bánffy as Doki
- Katalin Lukácsy as Ibike (police secretary)
- Béla Romwalter (voice dubbed by Péter Beregi) as Ricsi
- Ottó Elek (voice dubbed by András Várkonyi) as Ottó

== Episode list ==
=== Pilots (1984) ===
No.	Title	Original release date
1	(Hungarian: A szatír)	November 2, 1984
2	(Hungarian: A fotómodell)	December 1, 1984
3	(Hungarian: Oszkár tudja)	December 22, 1984

=== Season 1 (1986) ===
No.	Title	Original release date
4	(Hungarian: A tizennyolc karátos aranyhal)	May 17, 1986
5	(Hungarian: Pavane egy infánsnő halálára)	June 14, 1986
6	(Hungarian: Piros, mint a Kármin)	July 12, 1986
7	(Hungarian: Rebeka)	September 19, 1986
8	(Hungarian: A Panoptikum)	October 18, 1986
9	(Hungarian: Software)	November 22, 1986
10	(Hungarian: A Pop-pokol)	December 27, 1986

=== Season 2 (1989–1990) ===
No.	Title	Original release date
11	(Hungarian: Víziszony)	October 7, 1989
12	(Hungarian: Aranyháromszög)	November 4, 1989
13	(Hungarian: Stoplis angyalok)	December 2, 1989
14	(Hungarian: Erotic Show)	December 30, 1989
15	(Hungarian: Tüzes babák)	January 27, 1990
16	(Hungarian: Hazajáró lélek)	February 24, 1990
17	(Hungarian: Régi barát)	March 24, 1990

== Revival ==
The makers filmed the sequel to Linda in 2000. Nóra Görbe was already inundated with letters from fans asking for a sequel. However, the actress resisted the request for a long time, as she admitted that she was too boxed into the role of the screaming policewoman and did not receive any role offers from directors. She finally accepted that this was how the audience took her into their heart. In 1999, she was approached by Magyar Televízió and told that a part of the former staff had formed. Eventually, she was persuaded to accept the sequel, which was broadcast for the first time on March 19, 2002, after much struggle. In addition to Nóra Görbe, Béla Szerednyey and Gyula Bodrogi, actors such as Péter Blaskó, Tibor Gazdag, László Borbély, Károly Gesztesi, Róbert Gergely, Péter Gábor Vincze, Kriszta Bíró, etc. took part in the new series.

=== Season 1 ===
No.	Title	Original release date
1	(Hungarian: A piros dáma)	March 19, 2002
2	(Hungarian: A fekete király)	March 21, 2002
3	(Hungarian: Az ász)	March 22, 2002
4	(Hungarian: A pokoli játszma)	March 24, 2002
5	(Hungarian: Az ördög golyó)	March 26, 2002

== Allegations of plagiarism of theme music ==
In 2019, Zoltán Krisko, manager of the estate of composer György Vukán, started a lawsuit against Marvel Entertainment, Warner Chappell Music, The Walt Disney Company, FOX Corporation, Buena Vista Television, NBCUniversal Media Group, Amazon.com, Inc., and Apple Inc., as well as composers Ron Wasserman, Shuki Levy, and Haim Saban, alleging that the opening theme of X-Men: The Animated Series (1992-1997) was ripping-off Linda's theme song. The lawsuit was settled in January 2021, and the X-Men theme would continue to be used by Marvel in the series' revival, X-Men '97 (2024), as well as the Marvel Cinematic Universe film Doctor Strange in the Multiverse of Madness and miniseries Ms. Marvel (both 2022).
