= József Köves =

Hungarian writer

József Köves (born July 7, 1938, in Budapest) is a Hungarian publisher, writer, and journalist.

== Early life and education ==
Köves attended the MÚOSZ Journalism School from 1961 to 1962. He later pursued his studies at Eötvös Loránd University, Faculty of Humanities, specializing in library science and Hungarian literature, from 1975 to 1981.

== Career ==
Köves started his professional career in various administrative and journalistic roles. From 1956 to 1957, he worked as an administrator at the Ercsi cukorgyár (Ercsi Sugar Factory). In 1959, he served as a warehouse administrator at the Pest-Budai Vendéglátó Vállalat (Hospitality Company of Pest-Buda). Between 1959 and 1970, he worked as a propaganda presenter at the Állami Könyvterjesztő Vállalat (State Book Distributor Company). From 1970 to 1972, he worked as a journalist for a company newspaper.

In 1972, Köves became the head of the press group at Művelt Nép Könyvterjesztő (Cultured People's Book Distributor), where he served for five years. From 1977 to 1985, he held the position of Deputy Head of the Propaganda Department at the Hungarian Publishers and Distributors Association.

In 1985, Köves transitioned to work in radio broadcasting. In 1990, he worked as a journalist and editor at 7Lap, and since 1992, he has been the director of K.u.K. Könyvkiadó (K.u.K. Publishing House).

== Personal life ==
In 1962, Köves József married Julianna Kemény. They have a son named Köves Gábor, who was born in 1967.

== Main works ==
- The Griffin-Licence (original title: A griff-licenc) (satire, 1984)
- The Shared Dog (novel, 1982)
- Longlegged, Allfat, Chucklehead (play, 2000)
- Golden Book of Jewish Humor (compilation, 2003)
- Marionette Short Story (short-story, 1984)
- If I Remember Well to One of My Lives (novel, 2000)

== Editorial works ==
- Half a Hundred Sentences for My Mother (2004)
- Half a Hundred Sentences about Love (2000)
- 25 Years of the General Education (1973)
- Book of Bosom-Friends (1997)

== Films ==
- Common Dog (1983)

== Publications ==
- The Conditions are better in the Book Stores Though - Life and Literature, 4. vol, 48th Year

== Quotes ==
"Now I would have to sign here... But my name... Unfortunately, I cannot remember it most of the time."

== See also ==
- Alfred Soultan
- István Fekete

== Sources ==
http://www.szinhaz.hu/karpatok/csiki/e_nyakiglab.html http://www.kisalfold.hu/cikk.php?id=&cid=75549%5B‍%5D http://apro.origo.hu/showAdvert,39074,165,2077.html%5B‍%5D https://web.archive.org/web/20070930132757/http://www.oszk.hu/gyt/2000_191/elemi/454261.html http://www.intermedia.c3.hu/dogandbeer/irodalom.htm http://www.es.hu/pd/display.asp?channel=AGORA0404&article=2004-0126-0940-21VNGA http://www.jgytf.u-szeged.hu/tanszek/magyar/bi/bibib.htm http://www.tujvmkvk.hu:4505/ALEPH/SESSION-8256/direct-doc/TIV01-0089223-999-SYSNO%5B‍%5D http://www.kulturinfo.hu/moreinfo.gcw?prgid=20031
