= Léo Trespeuch =

French snowboarder (born 1987)

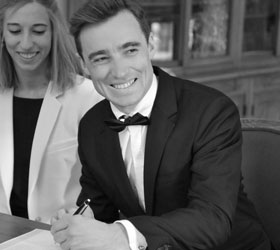
Leo Trespeuch

Léo Trespeuch, was born on 4 April 1987. He lives in Val Thorens. He has practiced snowboarding since 1997. On the 26 January 2007, he became the Boardercross University World Champion. He studied at University of Savoy and University of Grenoble. He researches into sports marketing, including Sponsoring, Crowdfunding and Participation.
