= Nóra Görbe =

Hungarian pop singer and actress (born 1956)

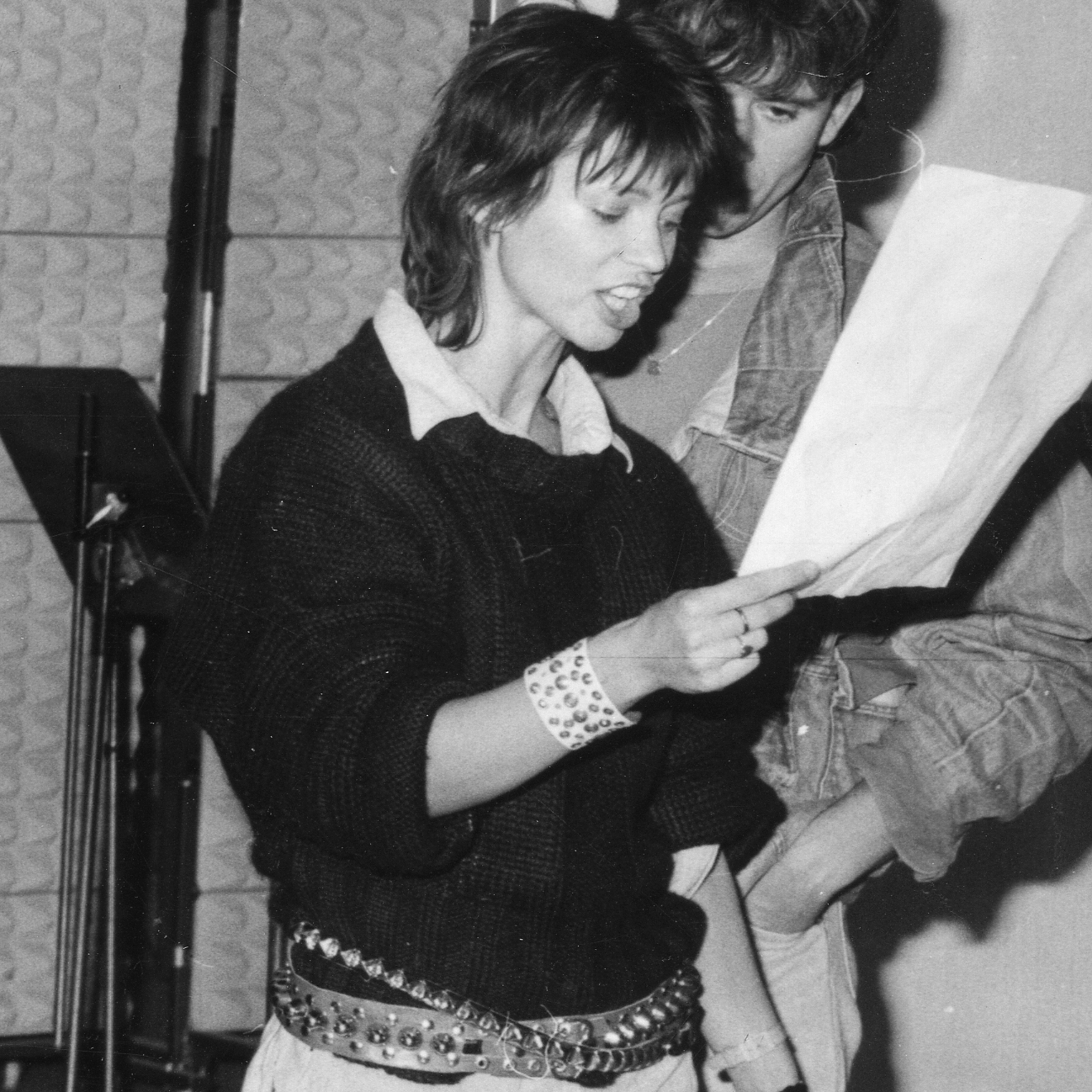
- Görbe in 1986
- Born: 3 September 1956 (age 70); Debrecen, Hungary
- Occupations: Actress; singer
- Years active: 1975–present
- Spouses: György Gát (m. 1976; div. 1992); Dr. Péter Ormos (m. 2006; died 2016)
- Children: 2
- Father: János Görbe

Nóra Görbe (born 3 September 1956) is a Hungarian pop singer and actress.

== Biography ==
- She is the daughter of prominent Hungarian actor of film and theater János Görbe.
- She considered becoming a ballet dancer before turning to acting.
- Although having appeared in many films, television films and plays, she is most famous for her signature role as karate expert detective Linda Veszprémi in the action adventure series Linda (1984–1989).
- She has two children with producer and creator of Linda György Gát, her former partner: Interintellect CEO Anna Gát (b. 1983) and Márton (b. 1989).
- Besides being an actress, she also recorded a number of albums and toured extensively in the 1980s and 1990s. She has released children's music as well.
- She has recently retired from the limelight, although a retro wave made her a press favorite after the rerun of the show.

== See also ==
- Hungarian pop
