= Duncan Campbell (snowboarder) =

New Zealand snowboarder (born 1997)

Personal information
- Born: 23 January 1997 (age 28); Dunedin

Sport
- Country: New Zealand
- Sport: Snowboarding
- Event: Snowboard cross

Duncan Campbell (born 23 January 1997) is a New Zealand snowboarder who competes internationally.

He was selected to participate in the 2018 Winter Olympics, in men's snowboard cross.
