= The Little Fox =

- DVD cover
- Directed by: Attila Dargay
- Screenplay by: Attila Dargay; István Imre; Ede Tarbay
- Based on: Vuk; 1965 novel by István Fekete
- Starring: Judit Pogány; József Gyabronka; Teri Földi; Gyula Szabó
- Cinematography: Irén Henrik
- Edited by: János Czipauer; Magda Hap
- Music by: Peter Wolf
- Production company: Pannónia Filmstúdió
- Distributed by: Mokép
- Release dates: 10 December 1981 (Budapest, Hungary); 7 November 1987 (USA)
- Running time: 76 minutes
- Country: Hungary
- Language: Hungarian
- Budget: 7 million Ft
- Box office: 17.2 million Ft

The Little Fox, known in Hungary as Vuk, is a 1981 Hungarian animated film produced by Pannónia Filmstúdió, based on the 1965 novel Vuk by István Fekete. The film is directed by Attila Dargay and written by Attila Dargay, István Imre, and Ede Tarbay, and was released in December 1981.

A computer-animated sequel, A Fox's Tale, was released in 2008 to negative reception.

== Plot ==
The film tells the story of a little red fox kit, Vic (Vuk in the original Hungarian version), who ventures away from his family's den and, upon his return, finds it empty. He concludes that his whole family left the den with the human hunter (called "Smoothskinner" in the cartoon) because he can smell him. His maternal uncle Karak finds him, then offers for the little fox to stay with him, and Karak continues to raise him.

As Vic grows older, he develops much cunning and cleverness. Now a young adult fox, he even dares to infiltrate the hunter's house, during which he finds a vixen, named Foxy, held captive in a cage. During a stormy night, he tricks the guard dogs and other animals, as well as the hunter himself, and eventually helps the vixen escape by smashing the cage open with a loaded wagon.

Foxy joins Vic and Karak in the woods, but when Autumn comes, Karak is shot by the hunter during the seasonal hunt. Vic swears revenge on the hunter and finally accomplishes it: first by breaking into the food locker and eating up all the eggs, then taking away all the poultry from the cages while playing many jokes on the hunter's dim-witted dogs (which results in the two dogs becoming strays at the end). Eventually, the hunter decides to set up bear traps around his house, luring Vic with a goose roast; however, the two hunting dogs fall into the traps, and the third one seriously injures the hunter himself. At the end of the film, Vic and Foxy have cubs of their own.

== Production ==
Originally produced as a TV series, Dargay visited the Budapest Zoo to study the movements and habits of newborn fox cubs.

== Voice cast ==
Character name		Voice actor	
Hungarian	English	Hungarian	English
Vuk	Vic	József Gyabronka	Steven R. Weber
Young Vuk	Young Vic	Judit Pogány	Corinne Orr
Íny (Mother)		Teri Földi	Anne Costello
Kag (Father)		Gyula Szabó	John Bellucci
Karak		László Csákányi	William Kiehl
Fox girl	Foxy	Erzsébet Kútvölgyi	Lucy Martin
"Smooth-skinned" (The Hunter)	Chester the Hunter	Róbert Koltai	Peter Newman
Vahúr		Sándor Szabó	Unknown
Fickó		András Márton	Unknown
Hooded Crow		Gyula Bodrogi	Unknown
Shepherd Dog		Ottó Füzessy	Unknown
Narrator		Tibor Bitskey	John Bellucci

=== Additional voices ===
- Anne Costello
- George Gonneau
- Les Marshak
- Peter Newman
- Maia Danziger
- Ira Lewis

=== English version ===
The English dub of the animation, titled simply The Little Fox, was produced in 1987 by Robert Halmi, Inc. It was broadcast in the United States as part of Nickelodeon's Special Delivery block and released on home video by Celebrity Home Entertainment. The English dub changed Vuk's name to "Vic" and his partner's name to "Foxy," although Karak's name remains unchanged.

== Reception and legacy ==
Video Choice gave the film a positive review, calling it a "charming and visually appealing film" while author Giannalberto Bendazzi (Animation: A World History) called it "an excellent example of the personality of animation".

A digital restoration was completed in 2021 under the supervision of the film's cinematographer. It remains the most-popular Hungarian animated feature of all time. The director had said that putting Vuk on screen was one of his dearest cartoon works.

Diego Pineda Paceco of Collider called the film:

An irresistibly charming, nostalgia–filled, family–friendly adventure that displays all of Hungarian animation's biggest strengths in their full splendor.

== Home media ==
The film was released on VHS in 1987 by Celebrity Home Entertainment and re-released on 4 November 1994.

== See also ==
- Foxes in popular culture, films and literature
- The Fox and the Hound - a similar 1981 animated film about a fox
- The Seventh Brother
- List of animated feature films of 1981
- List of Hungarian films
- Pannonia Film Studio
