= Tim Watter =

Swiss snowboarder (born 1991)

Personal information
- Born: 27 December 1991 (age 34) Zürich, Switzerland

Sport
- Sport: Skiing

Tim Watter (born 27 December 1991 in Zürich) is a Swiss snowboarder, specializing in snowboard cross.

Watter competed at the 2014 Winter Olympics for Switzerland. In the snowboard cross, he finished 2nd in his 1/8 round race, advancing to the quarter-finals, where he was disqualified and failed to advance, ending up 21st overall.

As of September 2014, his best showing at the World Championships is 36th, in the 2013 snowboard cross.

Watter made his World Cup debut in February 2012. As of September 2014, his best finish is 5th, at Montafon in 2012–13. His best overall finish is 22nd, in 2012–13.
