= Hagen Kearney =

American snowboarder (born 1991)

Personal information
- Nationality: United States
- Born: November 6, 1991 (age 34) Buffalo, New York, U.S.
- Height: 6 ft 2 in (188 cm)

Sport
- Sport: Skiing
Medal record
Men's snowboarding
Representing the United States
World Championships
| Gold medal – first place | 2017 Sierra Nevada | Team snowboard cross |

Hagen Kearney (born November 6, 1991) is an American snowboarder who competes internationally.

He competed for the US at the FIS Freestyle Ski and Snowboarding World Championships 2017 in Sierra Nevada, Spain, where he won a gold medal in the men's snowboard team cross, along with Nick Baumgartner.

He competed for the US at the XXIII Olympic Winter Games in Pyeongchang County, Gangwon Province, South Korea, where he placed 13th overall in the Men's Snowboard Cross.
