= Anton Koprivitsa =

Russian snowboarder (born 1991)

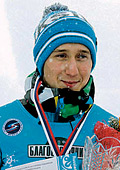

Personal information
- Born: October 20, 1991 Ufa, Russian SSR, Soviet Union

Sport
- Sport: Skiing

Anton Koprivitsa (born October 20, 1991, in Ufa) is a Russian snowboarder, specializing in snowboard cross.

Koprivitsa competed at the 2014 Winter Olympics for Russia. In the snowboard cross, he finished 5th in his 1/8 round race, not advancing and finishing 33rd overall.

As of September 2014, his best showing at the World Championships is 46th, in the 2013 snowboard cross.

Koprivitsa made his World Cup debut in December 2012. As of September 2014, his best finish is 18th, coming at La Molina in 2013–14. His best overall finish is 38th, in 2013–14.
