= Jussi Taka =

Finnish snowboarder (born 1993)

Personal information
- Born: 25 April 1993 (age 33) Rovaniemi, Finland

Sport
- Sport: Skiing

Jussi Taka (born 25 April 1993 in Rovaniemi) is a Finnish snowboarder, specializing in snowboard cross.

Taka competed at the 2014 Winter Olympics for Finland. In the snowboard cross, he finished 5th in his 1/8 round race, not advancing, and ending up 33rd overall.

As of September 2014, his best showing at the World Championships is 30th, in the 2013 snowboard cross.

Taka made his World Cup debut in December 2010. As of September 2014, his best finish is 4th, at Vallnord-Arcalis in 2013–14. His best overall finish is 25th, in 2013–14.
