= Thomas W. Bankes =

American painter and photographer

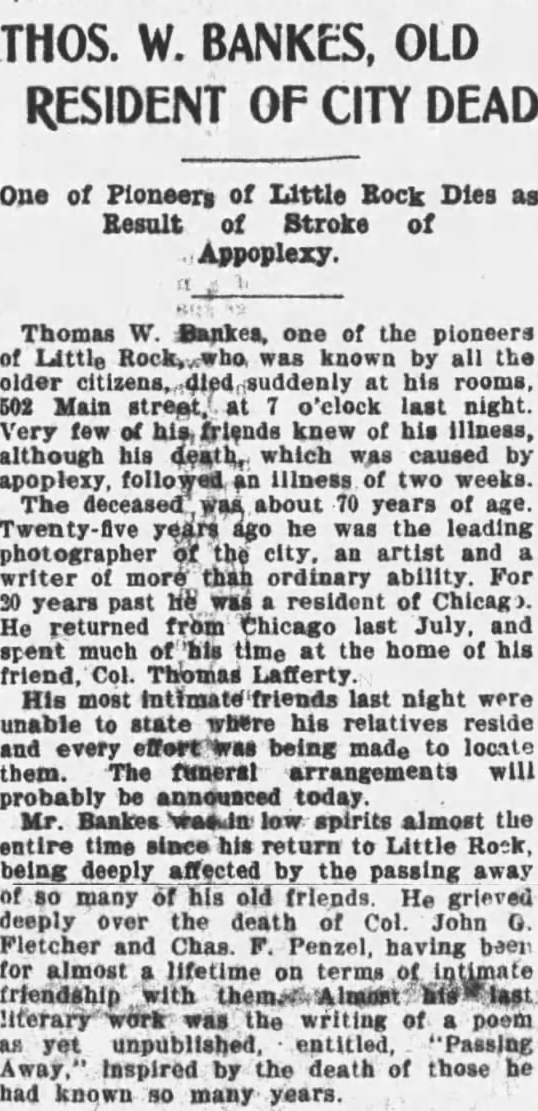

Thomas W. Bankes, whose last name was sometimes written as Banks, was an English-born American painter, photographer, and poet in Arkansas. He was active in Helena, Arkansas and then Little Rock, Arkansas (the capital) from 1863 to 1878.

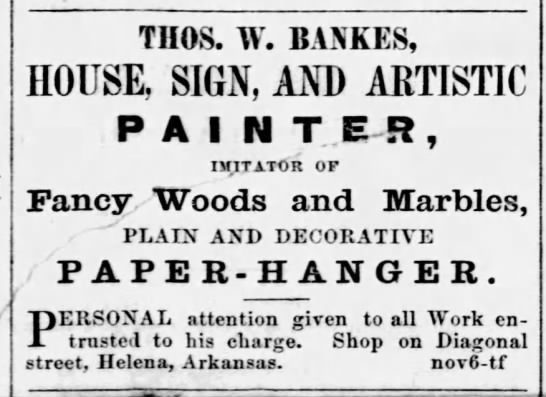
Advertisement in Helena's Southern Shield newspaper

He was born in England ca. 1830.

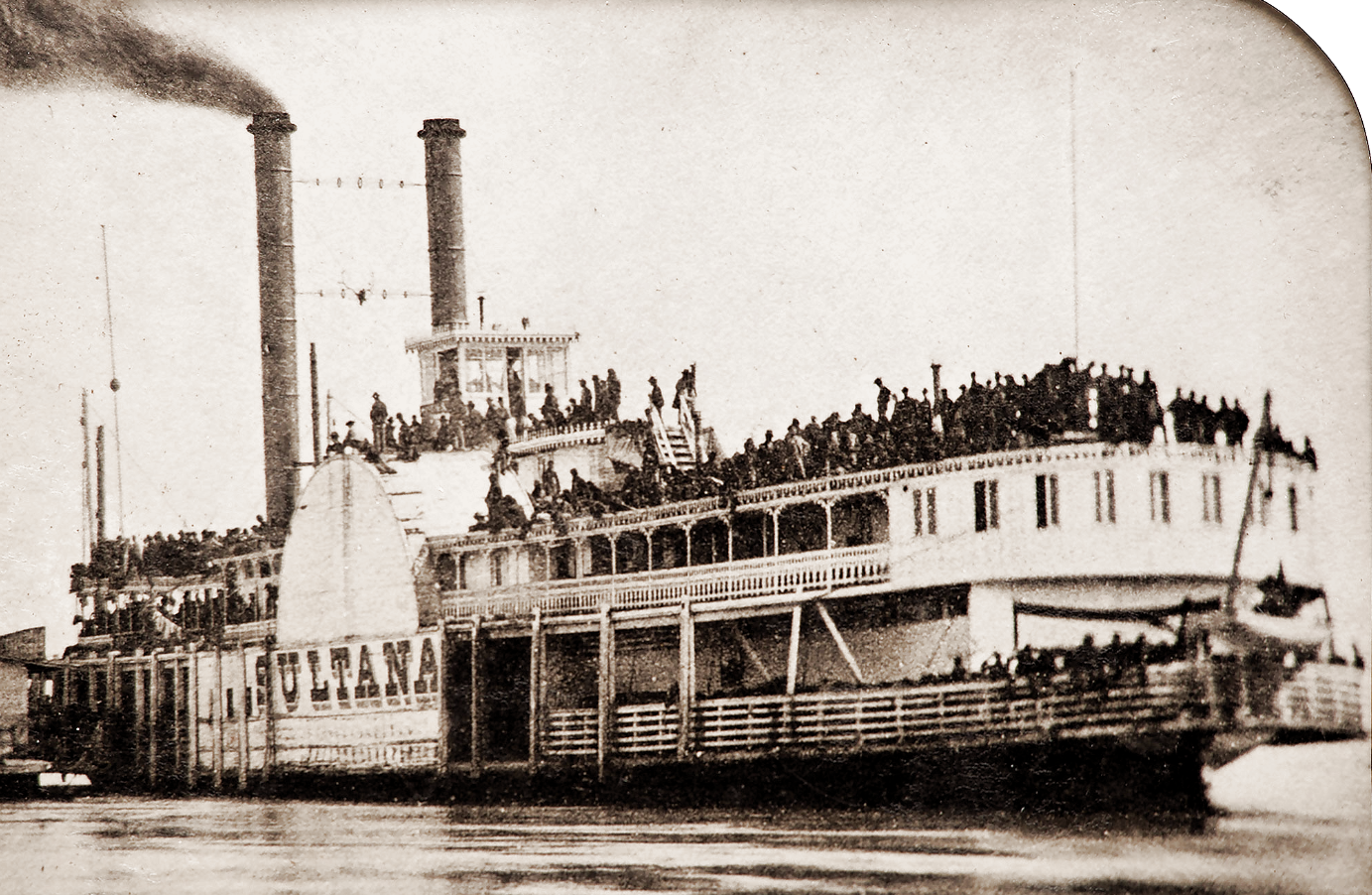

During the Civil War he photographed officers. He photographed the overcrowded steamship Sultana before it exploded and sank with about 1,167 killed in the disaster. He photographed members of the 1866-67 Arkansas Senate.

His studio produced stereographic series.

He wrote a monograph about the history of photography and stated, "Science invented a photographer of its own who dips his pencil in the sunbeam, and traces with unerring truth the living shadows of the passing time.” After moving to Chicago, Illinois he wrote about Arkansas. He returned to Arkansas towards the end of his life.

Hasie & Benton also photographed soldiers in Helena, Arkansas.
