= Hanno Douschan =

Austrian snowboarder (born 1989)

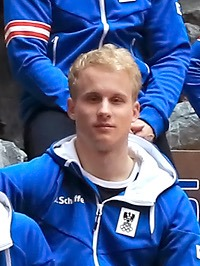

Personal information
- Nationality: Austrian
- Born: 5 September 1989 (age 36) Klagenfurt, Austria
- Height: 1.71 m (5 ft 7 in)
- Weight: 75 kg (165 lb)

Sport
- Country: Austria
- Sport: Snowboarding
- Event: Snowboard cross
- Club: Snowboard Union Gigasport
Medal record
World Championships
Silver medal – second place	2019 Utah	Snowboard cross

Hanno Douschan (born 5 September 1989) is an Austrian snowboarder. He has represented Austria at the 2014 Winter Olympics in Sochi.

He participated at the FIS Freestyle Ski and Snowboarding World Championships 2019, winning a medal.
