= Chris Robanske =

Canadian snowboarder

Personal information
- Born: 30 December 1989 (age 36) Calgary, Alberta, Canada
- Home town: North Vancouver, British Columbia
- Height: 1.80 m (5 ft 11 in)
- Weight: 83 kg (183 lb)

Sport
- Country: Canada
- Sport: Snowboarding
Medal record
Men's snowboarding
Representing Canada
World Championships
Bronze medal – third place	2017 Sierra Nevada	Team snowboard cross

Chris Robanske (born December 30, 1989) is a Canadian snowboarder. He competes primarily in snowboard cross and represented Canada in this event at the 2014 Winter Olympics in Sochi and the 2018 Winter Olympics in PyeongChang.
