= Emil Novák =

Czech snowboarder

Personal information
- Born: 12 April 1989 (age 37) Zábřeh, Czechoslovakia

Sport
- Sport: Skiing

Emil Novák (born 12 April 1989) is a Czech snowboarder, specializing in snowboard cross.

Novák competed at the 2014 Winter Olympics for the Czech Republic. In the snowboard cross, he finished 4th in his 1/8 round race, failing to advance, and ending up 25th overall.

As of September 2014, his best showing at the World Championships is 16th, in the 2013 snowboard cross.

Novák made his World Cup debut in March 2008. As of September 2014, his best finish is 19th, at Blue Mountain in 2012–13. His best overall finish is 47th, in 2012–13.
