= István Fekete =

Hungarian writer (1900 - 1970)

István Fekete (25 January 1900, Gölle, Austria-Hungary – 23 June 1970, Budapest, Hungary) was a Hungarian writer. He wrote several youth novels and animal stories.

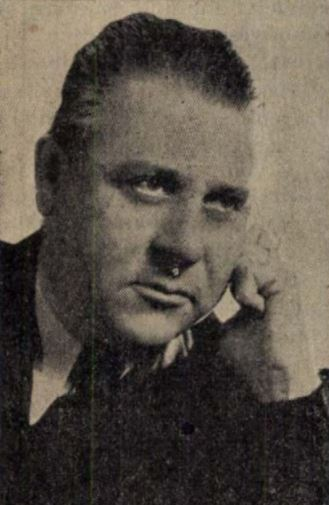
István Fekete

He is perhaps best known for his youth novel Tüskevár ("Thorn Castle", 1957), about two city boys' summer holiday at the corner of Lake Balaton and Zala River, their experiences, adventures, contact with Nature in its genuine form. They are helped by an old man on their gradual journey into manhood. This novel was awarded the Attila József Prize in 1960, was made into a television mini series in 1967 (see its IMDb entry) and was voted to be the 8th most liked novel of Hungary in the Big Read in 2005. Its sequel was Téli berek ("Winter Grove", 1959).

This novel, as well as Vuk: The Little Fox and Thistle, were also in the top 100 of the Hungarian Big Read.

== Novels about animals ==
- Bogáncs (1957): another famous novel of his; appeared in English as Thistle. It is about a sheepdog (pumi). It was made into a film in 1967 (IMDb entry).
- Lutra, the otter (1955); film version made in 1986 (IMDb entry)
- Vuk, the little fox (1965) English translation Vuk the fox cub" (2008) ISBN 978-963-11-8553-9. A very popular animated film was made from it in 1981.
- Kele, the stork (1955)
- Csí, about a couple of swallows (1940, short story)
- Hu, the owl (1966, novel)

== Other novels and short story collections ==
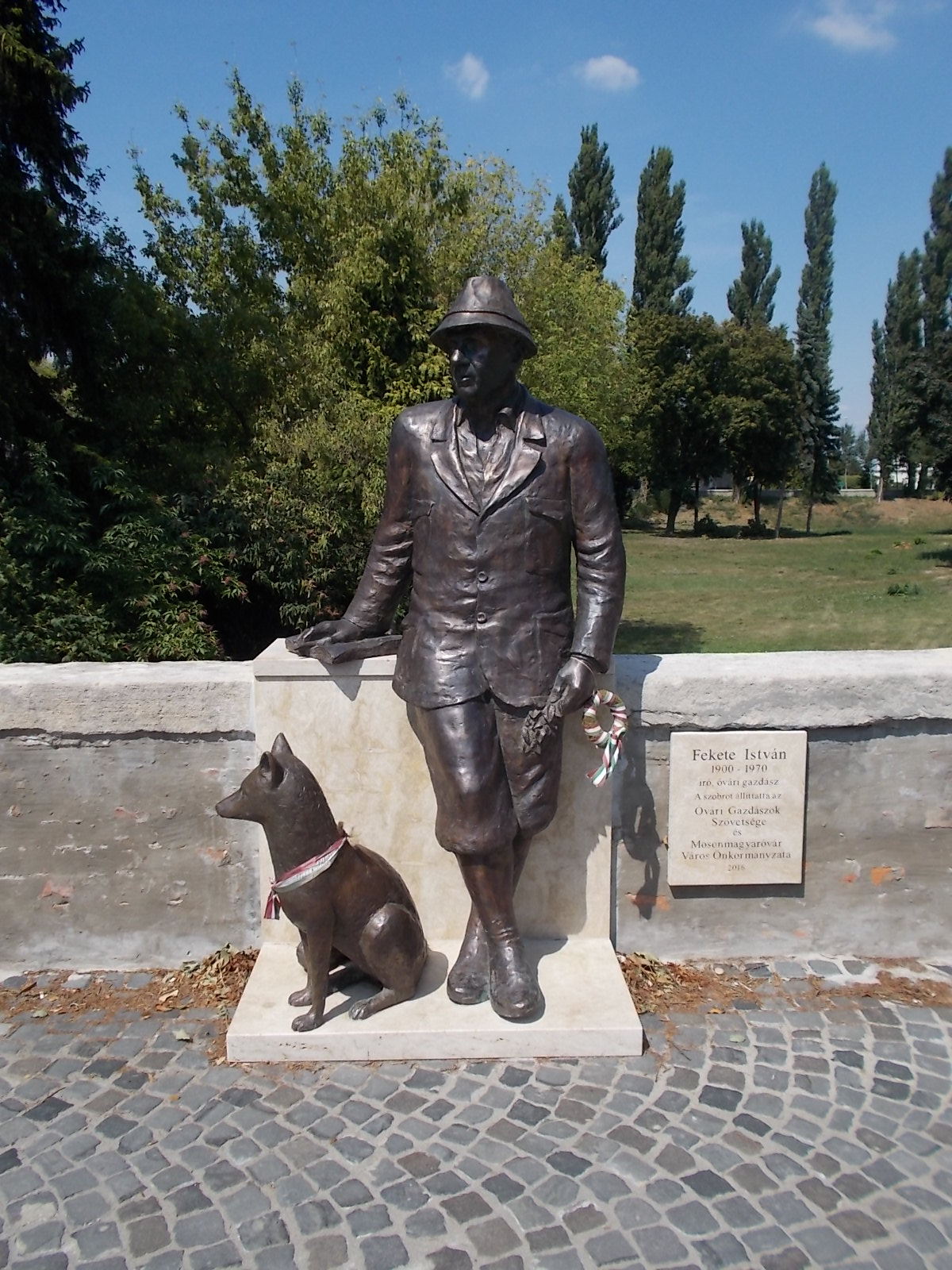
Statue of István Fekete by Ferenc Trischler

- A koppányi aga testamentuma ("The Testament of the Koppány Castle Agha", 1937), a historical novel taking place in 1586. A film was made from this novel as well (IMDb entry).
- Zsellérek ("Cottars", 1939, novel)
- Öreg utakon ("On Old Ways", 1941, stories)
- Hajnal Badányban ("Dawn in Badány", 1942, novel)
- Egy szem kukorica ("A Grain of Maize", 1944, stories)
- Derengő Hajnal ("Day Breaking", 1944, novel, originally released under the title: Emberek között, "Amongst People". Dramatization by Alfred Soultan)
- Gyeplő nélkül ("Without a Rein", 1947, novel)
- Tíz szál gyertya ("Ten Candles", 1948, stories)
- Halászat ("Fishing", 1955, handbook)
- Pepi-kert ("Pepi Garden", the history and description of the Szarvas arboretum, 1960)
- Köd ("Fog", 1960, hunting stories)
- Kittenberger Kálmán élete ("Life of Kálmán Kittenberger" [an explorer of Africa], 1962, novelistic biography)
- Őszi vásár ("Autumn Fair", 1962, stories)
- Csend ("Silence", 1965, novel)
- Huszonegy nap ("Twenty-one Days", stories, 1965)
- Barangolások ("Wanderings", 1968, stories)
- Ballagó idő ("Ambling Time", 1970, biographical novel; film version in 1976 (IMDb entry)
- Rózsakunyhó ("Rose Hut", stories, 1973 – posthumous)
- Tarka rét ("Motley Pasture", stories, 1973 – posthumous)

== Awards ==
- 1st Prize of the Géza Gárdonyi Association's novel competition 1937
- Attila József Award 1960
- A Munka Érdemrend arany fokozata 1970

== Legacy ==
The Fekete István Education Centre in Nimfea Nature Conservation Association is named after him.
