= Laro Herrero =

Spanish snowboarder (born 1990)

Laro Herrero Echevarri (born 17 January 1990 in Santander) is a Spanish snowboarder.

He participated for the first time at the Olympic Winter Games in Sochi 2014 where he was 33rd. He was eliminated at the eight finals finishing fifth in his heat.

== Olympic results ==
Season	Date	Location	Discipline	Place
2014	18 Feb 2014	(Russia) Sochi, Rusia	Snowboard cross	33rd
