= Woo Jin-yong =

South Korean athlete (born 1986)

Personal information
- Born: 1986 (age 39–40) South Korea

Sport
- Sport: Snowboarding
- Event: snowboard cross

Woo Jin-yong (Korean: 우진용, born 1986) is a CrossFit and snowboard athlete, specialising in snowboard cross racing.

He was born in South Korea in 1986 and educated at Chung-Ang University where he gained a master's degree in physical education (PE). He worked as a PE teacher and served as a marine. Then, when studying English in Canada, he became an enthusiastic snowboarder and has pursued this as a career. He was the first to officially represent South Korea as a national snowboarding athlete at the International Ski Federation Freestyle Ski Cross World Cup. Then he served as a coach for South Korea's national snowboarding team.

In February 2023, he won the Physical: 100 reality competition series on Netflix, beating 99 other athletes in a variety of competitions.
