= Baptiste Brochu =

Canadian snowboarder

Personal information
- Born: September 8, 1994 (age 31) Saguenay, Quebec, Canada
- Height: 175 cm (5 ft 9 in)
- Weight: 90 kg (198 lb)

Sport
- Country: Canada
- Sport: Snowboarding
- Event: Snowboard cross

Achievements and titles
- Olympic finals: 2018 Winter Olympics

Baptiste Brochu (born September 8, 1994) is a Canadian snowboarder, competing in the discipline of snowboard cross.

== Career ==
Brochu first appeared at a World Cup in December 2013. Brochu got on the podium for his first time (also his first win) in March 2016 at the World Cup in Veysonnaz, Switzerland. Brochu was ranked in the top-10 of the World Cup snowboard cross standings for the 2015–16 and 2016–17 seasons.

=== 2018 Winter Olympics ===
In January 2018, Brochu was named to Canada's 2018 Olympic team.
