= Kevin Hill (snowboarder) =

Canadian snowboarder (born 1986)

Personal information
- Nationality: Canadian
- Born: June 27, 1986 (age 40) Chilliwack, British Columbia, Canada
- Height: 1.83 m (6 ft 0 in)
- Weight: 78 kg (172 lb)

Sport
- Country: Canada
- Sport: Snowboarding
Medal record
Men's snowboarding
Representing Canada
World Championships
Silver medal – second place	2015 Kreischberg	Snowboard cross
Bronze medal – third place	2017 Sierra Nevada	Team snowboard cross
Winter X Games
Gold medal – first place	2015 Aspen	Snowboard cross
Silver medal – second place	2011 Aspen	Snowboard cross

Kevin Hill (born June 27, 1986) is a Canadian snowboarder. He competes primarily in snowboard cross and represented Canada in this event at the 2014 Winter Olympics in Sochi and the 2018 Winter Olympic Games in PyeongChang.

In January 2022, Hill was named to Canada's 2022 Olympic team.

== Notable international results ==
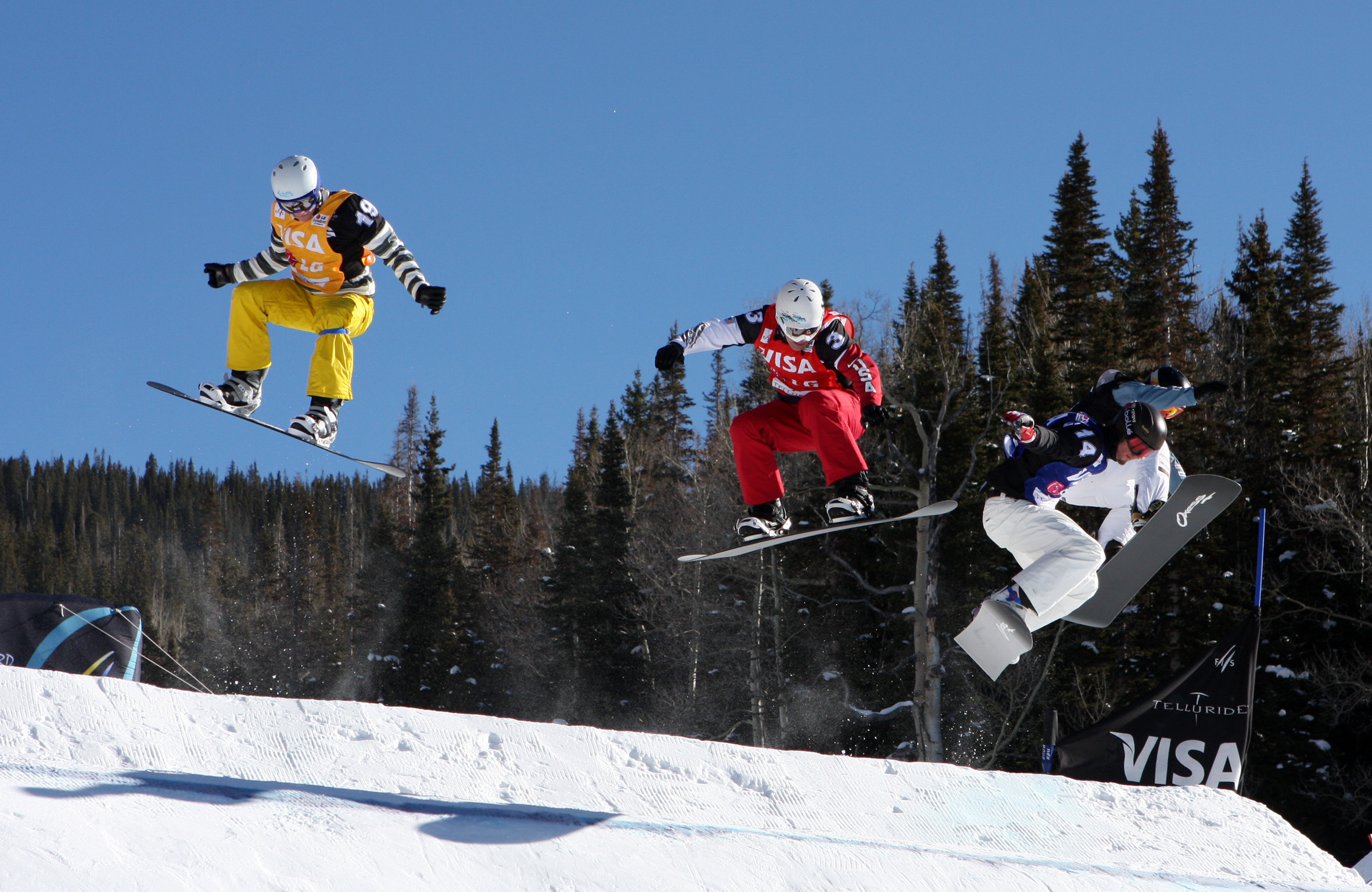
Kevin Hill, Nick Baumgartner, Pierre Vaultier, Fabio Caduff. Telluride, December 19, 2009

Olympics
Games	Event	Finish
2014 Sochi	Men's snowboard cross	8
2018 PyeongChang	Men's snowboard cross	14
FIS Freestyle Ski and Snowboarding World Championships
2011 FIS	Men's snowboard cross	14
2013 FIS	Men's snowboard cross	33
2015 FIS	Men's snowboard cross	Silver
2017 FIS	Men's snowboard cross	21
2017 FIS	Men's snowboard team cross	Bronze
Winter X-Games
2010 Winter X Games	Men's snowboard cross	21
2011 Winter X Games	Men's snowboard cross	Silver
2012 Winter X Games	Men's snowboard cross	24
2014 Winter X Games	Men's snowboard cross	4
2015 Winter X Games	Men's snowboard cross	Gold

== See also ==
- FIS Snowboard World Cup
- X Games
