= Regino Hernández =

Spanish snowboarder (born 1991)

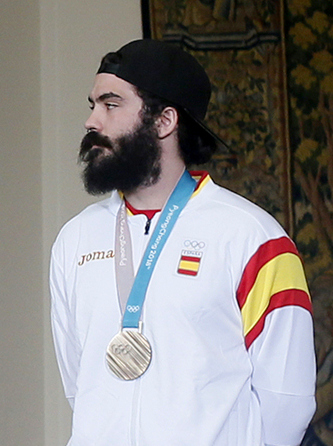
- Regino Hernández

Personal information
- Full name: Regino Hernández Martín
- Nationality: Spanish
- Born: 25 July 1991 (age 34) Ceuta

Sport
- Country: Spain
- Sport: Snowboarding
Medal record
Men's snowboarding
Representing Spain
Olympic Games
Bronze medal – third place	2018 Pyeongchang	Snowboard cross
World Championships
Silver medal – second place	2017 Sierra Nevada	Team snowboard cross
Junior World Championships
Gold medal – first place	2011 Valmalenco	Snowboard cross

Regino Hernández Martín (Note: In this Spanish name, the first or paternal surname is Hernández and the second or maternal family name is Martín.) (Spanish pronunciation: [reˈxino eɾˈnandeθ maɾˈtin]; born 25 July 1991 in Ceuta) is a Spanish snowboarder.

== Career ==
On 29 March 2011, he won a gold medal in snowboard cross at the 2011 FIS Junior World Championships in Valmalenco, Italy.

Regino participated for the first time at the Olympic Winter Games in Vancouver 2010 where he was 31st. He was eliminated at the 1/8 round. Four years later in Sochi 2014 he reached the quarterfinals where he was eliminated finished 21st. In Pyeongchang 2018 he reached the final and achieved the bronze medal. It was Spain's first medal at the Winter Olympics since 1992.

His first World Cup podium was in La Molina, Spain on 15 March 2014.

== World Cup podiums ==
=== Individual events ===
Season	Date	Location	Discipline	Place
2014	15 Mar 2014	La Molina, Spain	Snowboard cross	3rd

=== Team events ===
Season	Date	Location	Discipline	Place
2017	18 Dec 2016	Montafon, Austria	Snowboard cross team	1st
2018	17 Dec 2017	Montafon, Austria	Snowboard cross team	1st
2018	18 Mar 2018	Veysonnaz, Switzerland	Snowboard cross team	2nd

== Olympic results ==
Season	Date	Location	Discipline	Place
2010	15 Feb 2010	Vancouver, Canada	Snowboard cross	31st
2014	18 Feb 2014	(Russia) Sochi, Rusia	Snowboard cross	21st
2018	15 Feb 2018	Pyeongchang, South Korea	Snowboard cross	3rd place, bronze medalist(s)
