= Markus Schairer =

Austrian snowboarder

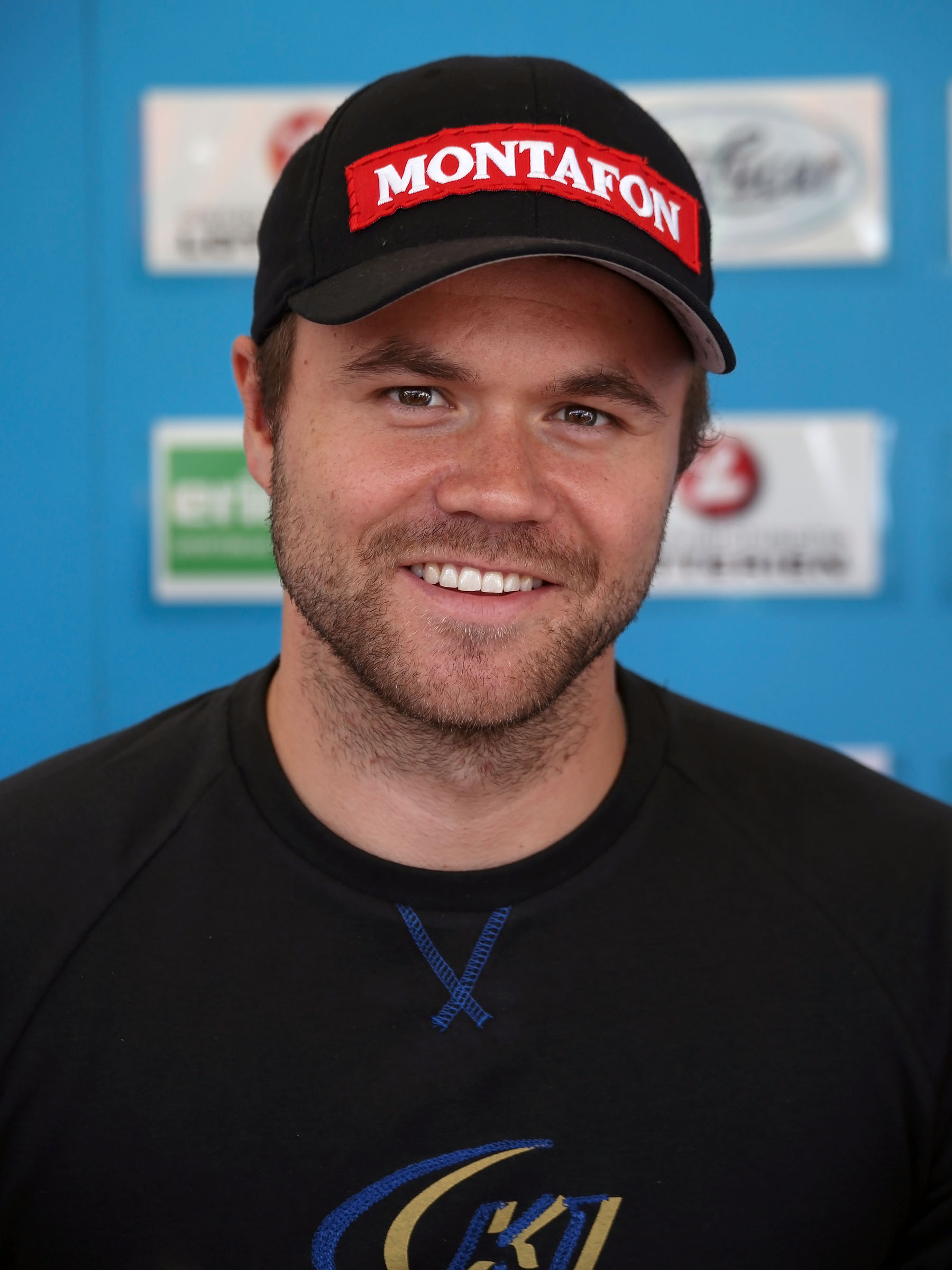

Medal record

Men's snowboarding

Representing Austria

World Championships
| Gold medal – first place | 2009 Gangwon | Snowboard cross |
| Silver medal – second place | 2013 Stoneham | Snowboard cross |

Winter X Games
| Silver medal – second place | 2008 Aspen | Snowboard cross |

Junior World Championships
| Silver medal – second place | 2007 Bad Gastein | Snowboard cross |

Markus Schairer (born 4 July 1987 in Bludenz) is an Austrian snowboarder.

== Career ==
He received a silver medal in snowboard cross at the 2008 Winter X Games XII in Aspen, Colorado, behind winner Nate Holland.

He received a silver medal in snowboard cross at the 2007 Junior World Championships in Bad Gastein, behind Stian Sivertzen.
