= Tommaso Leoni =

Italian snowboarder (born 1991)

Personal information
- Born: 14 December 1991 (age 34) Asiago, Italy

Sport
- Sport: Skiing

Tommaso Leoni (born 14 December 1991) is an Italian snowboarder, specializing in snowboard cross.

Leoni competed at the 2014 Winter Olympics for Italy. In the snowboard cross, he finished 3rd in his 1/8 round race, but then 6th in his quarterfinal, not advancing and finishing 21st overall.

As of September 2014, his best showing at the World Championships is 14th, in the 2013 snowboard cross.

Leoni made his World Cup debut in March 2012. As of September 2014, his best finish is 5th, coming at three events. His best overall finish is 10th, in 2012–13.
