= Steven Williams (snowboarder) =

Argentine snowboarder

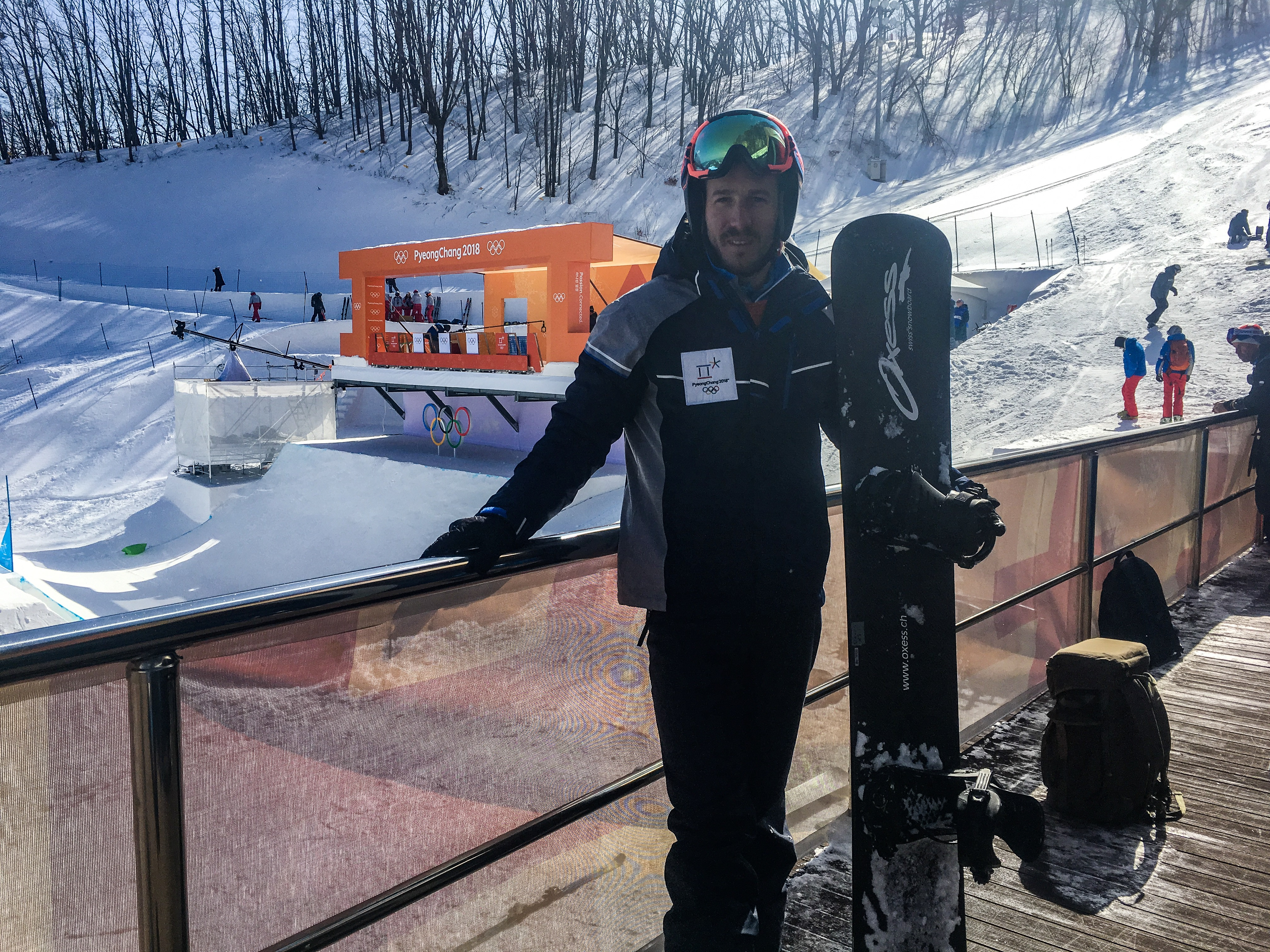
- Williams during the 2018 Winter Olympics

Personal information
- Born: 15 January 1988 (age 38) San Martín de los Andes, Neuquén Province, Argentina
- Height: 183 cm (6 ft 0 in)
- Weight: 78 kg (172 lb)

Sport
- Country: Argentina
- Sport: Snowboard
- Club: Club Andino San Martin de Los Andes

Steven Williams (born 15 January 1988) is an Argentine snowboarder. He competed in the 2018 Winter Olympics.

== Early life ==
Steven Williams was born in San Martín de los Andes on 15 January 1988. His father, of Welsh descent was the director of the local ski school. He taught Williams to ski from a very young age, and he spent much of his childhood in the ski resorts of the city. However, his father died when Williams was 13 years old, and decided to start working to help his family.

While he continued skiing after the death of his father, he soon became bored of it, and decided to switch to snowboard.

Before becoming a professional snowboarder, Williams worked as a firefighter, fishing guide and snowboard instructor.

== Sports career ==
Shortly after starting snowboarding, Williams began to participate in various Argentine competitions. In 2011 he managed to travel to Europe, where he participated in six tournaments. This allowed him to join the Argentine Ski Federation where he could improve his performance, winning three times the Argentine Championship and one European Cup. He was the South American Champion seven times, both in Argentina and Chile, and in individual tournaments in Ushuaia, Corralco and Bariloche. Later, he reached the Top 10 in the World Championship. He competed in the 2017–18 FIS Snowboard World Cup in Feldberg, Germany.

He was able to qualify for the 2018 Winter Olympics at the very last moment, due to reassignment of quotas from the International Ski Federation. With this, he became the first Argentine to compete in Snowboard Cross at the Winter Olympics. Williams managed to advance to the knockout stage, however he was surpassed by only four centimeters in the final straight by the French snowboarder Merlin Surget.

He showed interest in participating in the 2022 Winter Olympics.

== Personal life ==
He lives in Andorra, Argentina and Italy.
