= 2000–01 FIS Snowboard World Cup =

International snowboarding competition

Snowboard World Cup 2000/01
Discipline	Men	Women
Overall	(Canada) Jasey-Jay Anderson	(France) Karine Ruby
Giant slalom	(Italy) Walter Feichter	(France) Karine Ruby
Parallel slalom	(France) Mathieu Bozzetto	(Italy) Carmen Ranigler
Snowboard cross	(Sweden) Pontus Ståhlkloo	(France) Karine Ruby
Halfpipe	(Sweden) Magnus Sterner	(Germany) Sabine Wehr-Hasler

Competition
Individual	38	38

The 2000/01 FIS Snowboard World Cup was 7th multirace tournament over a season for snowboarding organised by International Ski Federation. The season started on 17 November 2000 and ended on 17 March 2001. This season included five disciplines: parallel slalom, giant slalom, parallel giant slalom, snowboard cross, and halfpipe.

== Men ==
=== Giant slalom ===
No.	Season	Date	Place	Event	Winner	Second	Third
61	1	19 November 2000	(France) Tignes	GS	(Italy) Walter Feichter	(Austria) Stefan Kaltschütz	(Sweden) Daniel Biveson
62	2	11 December 2000	(Canada) Whistler	GS	(Austria) Dieter Krassnig	(Canada) Jasey-Jay Anderson	(Sweden) Richard Richardsson
63	3	16 December 2000	(Canada) Mont-Sainte-Anne	GS	(Canada) Jasey-Jay Anderson	(Italy) Walter Feichter	(United States) Chris Klug
64	4	10 January 2001	(Switzerland) Gstaad	GS	(Austria) Stefan Kaltschütz	(Sweden) Stephen Copp	(Sweden) Daniel Biveson
–	-	14 March 2001	(Finland) Ruka	GS	Competition cancelled		

=== Parallel giant slalom ===
No.	Season	Date	Place	Event	Winner	Second	Third
11	1	2 December 2000	(Austria) Ischgl	PGS	(France) Nicolas Huet	(Austria) Werner Ebenbauer	(Austria) Dieter Krassnig
12	2	3 December 2000	(Austria) Ischgl	PGS	(Slovenia) Dejan Košir	(France) Nicolas Huet	(Canada) Jasey-Jay Anderson
13	3	10 January 2001	(Switzerland) Gstaad	PGS	(Slovenia) Dejan Košir	(Canada) Jasey-Jay Anderson	(France) Nicolas Huet
14	4	17 January 2001	(Italy) Kronplatz	PGS	(United States) Chris Klug	(Switzerland) Gilles Jaquet	(Switzerland) Ueli Kestenholz
15	5	11 February 2001	(Germany) Berchtesgaden	PGS	(Sweden) Richard Richardsson	(Austria) Alexander Maier	(France) Mathieu Bozzetto
16	6	17 February 2001	(Japan) Sapporo	PGS	(Canada) Jasey-Jay Anderson	(Sweden) Daniel Biveson	(United States) Chris Klug
17	7	24 February 2001	(Japan) Asahikawa	PGS	(France) Christophe Ségura	(United States) Chris Klug	(Canada) Jasey-Jay Anderson
18	8	4 March 2001	(United States) Park City	PGS	(Austria) Alexander Maier	(Switzerland) Gilles Jaquet	(Austria) Stefan Kaltschütz
19	9	14 March 2001	(Finland) Ruka	PGS	(France) Nicolas Huet	(Sweden) Richard Richardsson	(France) Mathieu Bozzetto

=== Parallel slalom ===
No.	Season	Date	Place	Event	Winner	Second	Third
42	1	1 December 2000	(Austria) Ischgl	PSL	(France) Mathieu Bozzetto	(Slovenia) Dejan Košir	(France) Nicolas Huet
43	2	7 January 2001	(Austria) Kreischberg	PSL	(France) Mathieu Bozzetto	(Austria) Dieter Krassnig	(Germany) Markus Ebner
44	3	31 January 2001	(Austria) Bad Gastein	PSL	(Germany) Markus Ebner	(Austria) Felix Stadler	(France) Mathieu Bozzetto
45	4	3 February 2001	(Germany) München	PSL	(France) Mathieu Chiquet	(Germany) Mathias Behounek	(France) Mathieu Bozzetto
46	5	9 February 2001	(Germany) Berchtesgaden	PSL	(France) Mathieu Bozzetto	(Austria) Dieter Krassnig	(Italy) Roland Fischnaller
47	6	15 March 2001	(Finland) Ruka	PSL	(Austria) Alexander Maier	(France) Charlie Cosnier	(Austria) Harald Walder

=== Snowboard cross ===
No.	Season	Date	Place	Event	Winner	Second	Third
24	1	17 November 2000	(France) Tignes	SBX	(Finland) Joni Vastamäki	(Sweden) Pontus Ståhlkloo	(Austria) Alexander Maier
25	2	8 December 2000	(Canada) Whistler	SBX	(Sweden) Pontus Ståhlkloo	(Canada) Jasey-Jay Anderson	(Germany) Sven Unger
26	3	5 January 2001	(Austria) Kreischberg	SBX	(Sweden) Pontus Ståhlkloo	(Germany) Markus Ebner	(Austria) Werner Ebenbauer
27	4	6 January 2001	(Austria) Kreischberg	SBX	(Sweden) Pontus Ståhlkloo	(Austria) Alexander Koller	(Germany) Michael Layer
28	5	13 January 2001	(France) Morzine	SBX	(Canada) Jasey-Jay Anderson	(Italy) Simone Malusà	(Switzerland) Guillaume Nantermod
29	6	14 January 2001	(France) Morzine	SBX	(Canada) Jasey-Jay Anderson	(Austria) Lukas Grüner	(Sweden) Jonas Aspman
30	7	19 January 2001	(Italy) Kronplatz	SBX	(Canada) Jasey-Jay Anderson	(France) Guillaume Sachot	(Australia) Zeke Steggall
31	8	16 February 2001	(Japan) Sapporo	SBX	(Canada) Jasey-Jay Anderson	(Sweden) Magnus Sterner	(Australia) John Fletcher
32	9	17 March 2001	(Finland) Ruka	SBX	(Canada) Jasey-Jay Anderson	(Sweden) Pontus Ståhlkloo	(France) Thomas Bourgault

=== Halfpipe ===
No.	Season	Date	Place	Event	Winner	Second	Third
54	1	18 November 2000	(France) Tignes	HP	(Switzerland) Gian Simmen	(Japan) Kentaro Miyawaki	(Sweden) Stefan Karlsson
55	2	10 December 2000	(Canada) Whistler	HP	(Sweden) Magnus Sterner	(Japan) Daisuke Murakami	(Japan) Takaharu Nakai
56	3	17 December 2000	(Canada) Mont Sainte-Anne	HP	(Canada) Trevor Andrew	(Canada) Brett Carpentier	(Finland) Tuomo Ojala
-	-	11 January 2001	(Switzerland) Gstaad	HP	Cancelled		
57	4	18 January 2001	(Italy) Kronplatz	HP	(Norway) Espen Arvesen	(Norway) Daniel Franck	(Sweden) Magnus Sterner
58	5	8 February 2001	(Germany) Berchtesgaden	HP	(Finland) Markku Koski	(Italy) Giacomo Kratter	(Norway) Jon Odden
59	6	10 February 2001	(Germany) Berchtesgaden	HP	(Germany) Jan Michaelis	(Canada) Brett Carpentier	(Sweden) Stefan Karlsson
60	7	18 February 2001	(Japan) Sapporo	HP	(Finland) Heikki Sorsa	(United States) Tommy Czeschin	(Sweden) Markus Jonsson
61	8	25 February 2001	(Japan) Asahikawa	HP	(United States) Tommy Czeschin	(Sweden) Magnus Sterner	(Sweden) Markus Jonsson
62	9	1 March 2001	(United States) Park City	HP	(Finland) Heikki Sorsa	(Canada) Guillaume Morisset	(Sweden) Stefan Karlsson
63	10	16 March 2001	(Finland) Ruka	HP	(Sweden) Markus Jonsson	(Sweden) Magnus Sterner	(Japan) Takaharu Nakai

== Standings: Men ==
Overall
Rank	Name	Points
1	(Canada) Jasey-Jay Anderson	1208
2	(Italy) Walter Feichter	892
3	(France) Nicolas Huet	794
4	(Austria) Stefan Kaltschütz	780
5	(France) Mathieu Bozzetto	776

Giant slalom
Rank	Name	Points
1	(Italy) Walter Feichter	2570
2	(Austria) Stefan Kaltschütz	2096
3	(Canada) Jasey-Jay Anderson	1930
4	(Austria) Dieter Krassnig	1530
5	(Sweden) Daniel Biveson	1400

Parallel slalom
Rank	Name	Points
1	(France) Mathieu Bozzetto	6785
2	(France) Nicolas Huet	6750
3	(Sweden) Richard Richardsson	6550
4	(Slovenia) Dejan Košir	5650
5	(Germany) Markus Ebner	5020

Snowboardcross
Rank	Name	Points
1	(Sweden) Pontus Ståhlkloo	4830
2	(Canada) Jasey-Jay Anderson	4800
3	(Austria) Alexander Maier	2520
4	(Germany) Markus Ebner	2480
5	(France) Guillaume Sachot	2390

Halfpipe
Rank	Name	Points
1	(Sweden) Magnus Sterner	4685
2	(Sweden) Stefan Karlsson	3662
3	(Germany) Jan Michaelis	3620
4	(Sweden) Markus Jonsson	2955
5	(Finland) Heikki Sorsa	2609

== Women ==
=== Giant slalom ===
No.	Season	Date	Place	Event	Winner	Second	Third
61	1	19 November 2000	(France) Tignes	GS	(Italy) Carmen Ranigler	(Italy) Marion Posch	(Germany) Heidi Renoth
62	2	11 December 2000	(Canada) Whistler	GS	(France) Karine Ruby	(Italy) Margherita Parini	(United States) Rosey Fletcher
63	3	16 December 2000	(Canada) Mont-Sainte-Anne	GS	(France) Karine Ruby	(United States) Sondra van Ert	(United States) Rosey Fletcher
64	4	10 January 2001	(Switzerland) Gstaad	GS	(Italy) Marion Posch	(France) Nathalie Desmares	(United States) Sondra van Ert
–	-	14 March 2001	(Finland) Ruka	GS	Competition cancelled		

=== Parallel giant slalom ===
No.	Season	Date	Place	Event	Winner	Second	Third
11	1	2 December 2000	(Austria) Ischgl	PGS	(Italy) Lidia Trettel	(Italy) Carmen Ranigler	(France) Karine Ruby
12	2	3 December 2000	(Austria) Ischgl	PGS	(France) Karine Ruby	(France) Isabelle Blanc	(Italy) Margherita Parini
13	3	10 January 2001	(Switzerland) Gstaad	PGS	(France) Karine Ruby	(Austria) Nina Schlegel	(Germany) Heidi Renoth
14	4	17 January 2001	(Italy) Kronplatz	PGS	(Italy) Marion Posch	(Italy) Carmen Ranigler	(Italy) Lidia Trettel
15	5	11 February 2001	(Germany) Berchtesgaden	PGS	(Italy) Carmen Ranigler	(Sweden) Sara Fischer	(Italy) Margherita Parini
16	6	17 February 2001	(Japan) Sapporo	PGS	(Switzerland) Stefanie von Siebenthal	(Italy) Margherita Parini	(Italy) Carmen Ranigler
17	7	24 February 2001	(Japan) Asahikawa	PGS	(France) Julie Pomagalski	(United States) Rosey Fletcher	(Italy) Marion Posch
18	8	4 March 2001	(United States) Park City	PGS	(Switzerland) Stefanie von Siebenthal	(France) Karine Ruby	(Switzerland) Milena Meisser
19	9	14 March 2001	(Finland) Ruka	PGS	(Italy) Carmen Ranigler	(Finland) Anna Kaltiainen	(Austria) Manuela Riegler

=== Parallel slalom ===
No.	Season	Date	Place	Event	Winner	Second	Third
48	1	1 December 2000	(Austria) Ischgl	PSL	(France) Karine Ruby	(Sweden) Sara Fischer	(Italy) Marion Posch
49	2	7 January 2001	(Austria) Kreischberg	PSL	(United States) Rosey Fletcher	(Slovakia) Jana Šedová	(Sweden) Sara Fischer
50	3	31 January 2001	(Austria) Bad Gastein	PSL	(United States) Rosey Fletcher	(Austria) Nina Schlegel	(France) Isabelle Blanc
51	4	3 February 2001	(Germany) München	PSL	(Italy) Carmen Ranigler	(France) Karine Ruby	(United States) Rosey Fletcher
52	5	9 February 2001	(Germany) Berchtesgaden	PSL	(United States) Rosey Fletcher	(Austria) Doris Günther	(Italy) Marion Posch
53	6	15 March 2001	(Finland) Ruka	PSL	(Italy) Carmen Ranigler	(Austria) Maria Kirchgasser-Pichler	(Italy) Margherita Parini

=== Snowboard cross ===
No.	Season	Date	Place	Event	Winner	Second	Third
24	1	17 November 2000	(France) Tignes	SBX	(France) Karine Ruby	(Germany) Sandra Farmand	(Austria) Manuela Riegler
25	2	8 December 2000	(Canada) Whistler	SBX	(Germany) Sandra Farmand	(Austria) Ursula Fingerlos	(France) Marie Laissus
26	3	5 January 2001	(Austria) Kreischberg	SBX	(Germany) Sandra Farmand	(France) Emmanuelle Duboc	(France) Karine Ruby
27	4	6 January 2001	(Austria) Kreischberg	SBX	(France) Karine Ruby	(Austria) Manuela Riegler	(Austria) Ursula Fingerlos
28	5	13 January 2001	(France) Morzine	SBX	(France) Karine Ruby	(Austria) Ursula Fingerlos	(Germany) Sandra Farmand
29	6	14 January 2001	(France) Morzine	SBX	(France) Karine Ruby	(France) Julie Pomagalski	(Russia) Mariya Tikhvinskaya
30	7	19 January 2001	(Italy) Kronplatz	SBX	(Canada) Maëlle Ricker	(Germany) Sandra Farmand	(France) Marie Laissus
31	8	16 February 2001	(Japan) Sapporo	SBX	(New Zealand) Juliane Bray	(Austria) Doris Günther	(France) Nathalie Desmares
32	9	17 March 2001	(Finland) Ruka	SBX	(Austria) Claudia Riegler	(Austria) Manuela Riegler	(Austria) Doris Günther

=== Halfpipe ===
No.	Season	Date	Place	Event	Winner	Second	Third
54	1	18 November 2000	(France) Tignes	HP	(Norway) Stine Brun Kjeldaas	(Finland) Minna Hesso	(France) Doriane Vidal
55	2	10 December 2000	(Canada) Whistler	HP	(Norway) Stine Brun Kjeldaas	(Japan) Michiyo Hashimoto	(Japan) Nagako Mori
56	3	17 December 2000	(Canada) Mont Sainte-Anne	HP	(Norway) Stine Brun Kjeldaas	(Japan) Michiyo Hashimoto	(Japan) Yoko Miyake
-	-	11 January 2001	(Switzerland) Gstaad	HP	Cancelled		
57	4	18 January 2001	(Italy) Kronplatz	HP	(United States) Tricia Byrnes	(Canada) Natasza Zurek	(United States) Kelly Clark
58	5	8 February 2001	(Germany) Berchtesgaden	HP	(Germany) Sabine Wehr-Hasler	(Italy) Alessandra Pescosta	(Japan) Yuri Yoshikawa
59	6	10 February 2001	(Germany) Berchtesgaden	HP	(Germany) Sabine Wehr-Hasler	(United Kingdom) Lesley McKenna	(Finland) Satu Järvelä
60	7	18 February 2001	(Japan) Sapporo	HP	(United States) Kelly Clark	(United Kingdom) Lesley McKenna	(France) Doriane Vidal
61	8	25 February 2001	(Japan) Asahikawa	HP	(United States) Gretchen Bleiler	(France) Doriane Vidal	(United States) Kelly Clark
62	9	1 March 2001	(United States) Park City	HP	(Canada) Natasza Zurek	(Norway) Stine Brun Kjeldaas	(United States) Shannon Dunn
63	10	16 March 2001	(Finland) Ruka	HP	(Switzerland) Fabienne Reuteler	(Norway) Kjersti Buaas	(Sweden) Anna Hellman

== Standings: Women ==
Overall
Rank	Name	Points
1	(France) Karine Ruby	1370
2	(Italy) Carmen Ranigler	1147
3	(United States) Rosey Fletcher	980
4	(Italy) Marion Posch	973
5	(Germany) Sandra Farmand	918

Giant slalom
Rank	Name	Points
1	(France) Karine Ruby	2480
2	(Italy) Marion Posch	2460
3	(United States) Sondra van Ert	2160
4	(Italy) Margherita Parini	1880
5	(Italy) Carmen Ranigler	1866

Parallel giant slalom
Rank	Name	Points
1	(Italy) Carmen Ranigler	8850
2	(France) Karine Ruby	7970
3	(United States) Rosey Fletcher	7540
4	(Italy) Margherita Parini	5050
4	(France) Isabelle Blanc	5050

Snowboardcross
Rank	Name	Points
1	(France) Karine Ruby	6000
2	(Germany) Sandra Farmand	5460
3	(France) Marie Laissus	3950
4	(Austria) Manuela Riegler	3920
5	(Austria) Ursula Fingerlos	3420

Halfpipe
Rank	Name	Points
1	(Germany) Sabine Wehr-Hasler	4650
2	(Norway) Stine Brun Kjeldaas	3800
3	(United Kingdom) Lesley McKenna	3610
4	(Japan) Michiyo Hashimoto	2613
5	(Japan) Yoko Miyake	2604

== Podium table by nation ==
Table showing the World Cup podium places (gold–1st place, silver–2nd place, bronze–3rd place) by the countries represented by the athletes.

Rank	Nation	Gold	Silver	Bronze	Total
1	France	17	10	15	42
2	Canada	10	7	2	19
3	Italy	9	8	9	26
4	United States	8	4	9	21
5	Sweden	6	11	12	29
6	Germany	6	4	6	16
7	Austria	5	17	9	31
8	Norway	4	3	1	8
9	Switzerland	4	2	3	9
10	Finland	4	2	2	8
11	Slovenia	2	1	0	3
12	New Zealand	1	0	0	1
13	Japan	0	4	5	9
14	Great Britain	0	2	0	2
15	Slovakia	0	1	0	1
16	Australia	0	0	2	2
17	Russia	0	0	1	1
Totals (17 entries)		76	76	76	228

== See also ==
- FIS Snowboarding World Championships 2001
