= 2002–03 FIS Snowboard World Cup =

International snowboarding competition

Snowboard World Cup 2002/03
Discipline	Men	Women
Overall	(Canada) Jasey-Jay Anderson	(France) Karine Ruby
Parallel	(France) Mathieu Bozzetto	(Switzerland) Ursula Bruhin
Snowboard cross	(France) Xavier de Le Rue	(France) Karine Ruby
Halfpipe	(Germany) Xaver Hoffmann	(Switzerland) Manuela Pesko
Big air	(Finland) Jukka Erätuli	

Competition
Individual	39	32

The 2002/03 FIS Snowboard World Cup was 8th multirace tournament over a season for snowboarding organised by International Ski Federation. The season started on 12 September 2002 and ended on 16 March 2003. This season included six disciplines: parallel slalom, parallel giant slalom, snowboard cross, halfpipe, and big air.

== Men ==
=== Parallel giant slalom ===
No.	Season	Date	Place	Event	Winner	Second	Third
32	1	15 September 2002	(Chile) Valle Nevado	PGS	(Austria) Lukas Grüner	(Canada) Mark Fawcett	(United States) Chris Klug
33	2	29 October 2002	(Austria) Sölden	PGS	(France) Mathieu Bozzetto	(Austria) Felix Stadler	(Austria) Alexander Maier
34	3	6 December 2002	(Sweden) Tandådalen	PGS	(Slovenia) Dejan Košir	(Austria) Siegfried Grabner	(Canada) Jasey-Jay Anderson
35	4	20 December 2002	(Canada) Stoneham	PGS	(France) Mathieu Bozzetto	(Canada) Jasey-Jay Anderson	(Switzerland) Gilles Jaquet
36	5	20 December 2002	(Canada) Stoneham	PGS	(Switzerland) Philipp Schoch	(Switzerland) Gilles Jaquet	(Canada) Jasey-Jay Anderson
37	6	8 February 2003	(Slovenia) Maribor	PGS	(France) Nicolas Huet	(Austria) Siegfried Grabner	(Switzerland) Gilles Jaquet
38	7	1 March 2003	(Japan) Sapporo	PGS	(France) Mathieu Bozzetto	(Slovenia) Dejan Košir	(Canada) Jasey-Jay Anderson
39	8	7 March 2003	(France) Serre Chevalier	PGS	(Switzerland) Simon Schoch	(Germany) Markus Ebner	(France) Mathieu Bozzetto
40	9	14 March 2003	(Switzerland) Arosa	PGS	(Canada) Jasey-Jay Anderson	(France) Mathieu Bozzetto	(Slovenia) Dejan Košir

=== Parallel slalom ===
No.	Season	Date	Place	Event	Winner	Second	Third
55	1	30 October 2002	(Austria) Sölden	PSL	(France) Mathieu Bozzetto	(Switzerland) Philipp Schoch	(Austria) Harald Walder
56	2	6 December 2002	(Sweden) Tandådalen	PSL	(Germany) Markus Ebner	(France) Mathieu Bozzetto	(Sweden) Daniel Biveson
57	3	18 December 2002	(Canada) Whistler	PSL	(France) Mathieu Bozzetto	(Austria) Michael Dabringer	(Austria) Felix Stadler
58	4	5 January 2003	(Austria) Bad Gastein	PSL	(France) Mathieu Bozzetto	(Switzerland) Philipp Schoch	(Switzerland) Urs Eiselin
59	5	9 February 2003	(Slovenia) Maribor	PSL	(France) Nicolas Huet	(Austria) Siegfried Grabner	(France) Mathieu Bozzetto
60	6	1 March 2003	(Japan) Sapporo	PSL	(France) Mathieu Bozzetto	(Sweden) Daniel Biveson	(Austria) Felix Stadler
61	7	9 March 2003	(France) Serre Chevalier	PSL	(Sweden) Daniel Biveson	(Austria) Michael Dabringer	(France) Mathieu Bozzetto

=== Snowboard cross ===
No.	Season	Date	Place	Event	Winner	Second	Third
41	1	12 September 2002	(Chile) Valle Nevado	SBX	(Canada) Drew Neilson	(France) Xavier de Le Rue	(Sweden) Jonte Grundelius
42	2	25 January 2003	(Germany) Berchtesgaden	SBX	(France) Xavier de Le Rue	(Italy) Francesco Sandrini	(Canada) Tom Velisek
43	3	26 January 2003	(Germany) Berchtesgaden	SBX	(Canada) Jasey-Jay Anderson	(France) Mickael David	(France) Xavier de Le Rue
44	4	29 January 2003	(Italy) San Candido	SBX	(Canada) Jasey-Jay Anderson	(Italy) Simone Malusà	(France) Mickael David
45	5	4 February 2003	(Austria) Bad Gastein	SBX	(France) Xavier de Le Rue	(Austria) Lukas Grüner	(Austria) Mario Fuchs
46	6	5 February 2003	(Austria) Bad Gastein	SBX	(France) Xavier de Le Rue	(France) Mickael David	(France) Sylvain Duclos
47	7	16 March 2003	(Switzerland) Arosa	SBX	(Canada) Drew Neilson	(France) Xavier de Le Rue	(Switzerland) Marco Huser

=== Halfpipe ===
No.	Season	Date	Place	Event	Winner	Second	Third
74	1	13 September 2002	(Chile) Valle Nevado	HP	(United States) Andy Finch	(Germany) Jan Michaelis	(Finland) Antti Autti
75	2	1 December 2002	(Switzerland) Laax	HP	(Switzerland) Therry Brunner	(Germany) Xaver Hoffmann	(Sweden) Magnus Sterner
76	3	7 December 2002	(Sweden) Tandådalen	HP	(Sweden) Magnus Sterner	(Sweden) John Lönqvist	(Norway) Halvor Lunn
77	4	19 December 2002	(Canada) Whistler	HP	(Japan) Domu Narita	(Germany) Xaver Hoffmann	(Germany) Vinzenz Lüps
78	5	21 December 2002	(Canada) Stoneham	HP	(Germany) Vinzenz Lüps	(Sweden) Magnus Sterner	(Canada) Justin Lamoureux
79	6	28 February 2003	(Japan) Sapporo	HP	(Sweden) Magnus Sterner	(United States) Tommy Czeschin	(Japan) Domu Narita
80	7	2 March 2003	(Japan) Sapporo	HP	(Germany) Xaver Hoffmann	(Finland) Antti Autti	(United States) Tommy Czeschin
81	8	8 March 2003	(France) Serre Chevalier	HP	(Germany) Xaver Hoffmann	(France) Gary Zebrowski	(Canada) Crispin Lipscomb
82	9	13 March 2003	(Switzerland) Arosa	HP	(Switzerland) Sergio Berger	(Germany) Xaver Hoffmann	(France) Gary Zebrowski

=== Big air ===
No.	Season	Date	Place	Event	Winner	Second	Third
5	1	26 October 2002	(Germany) Berlin	BA	(Sweden) Björn Lindgren	(Russia) Dmitry Fesenko	(Finland) Antti Autti
6	2	7 December 2002	(Sweden) Tandådalen	BA	(Sweden) Andreas Jakobsson	(Norway) Erik Haugo	(Finland) Sami Tuoriniemi
7	3	21 December 2002	(Canada) Stoneham	BA	(Finland) Risto Mattila	(Finland) Sami Tuoriniemi	(Germany) Vinzenz Lüps
8	4	3 January 2003	(Austria) Salzburg	BA	(Finland) Jukka Erätuli	(Austria) Florian Mausser	(Finland) Sami Tuoriniemi
9	5	1 February 2003	(Germany) München	BA	(Finland) Jukka Erätuli	(Finland) Sami Tuoriniemi	(Finland) Jaakko Ruha
10	6	14 February 2003	(Italy) Turin	BA	(Finland) Sami Tuoriniemi	(Finland) Jukka Erätuli	(Finland) Jaakko Ruha
11	7	15 March 2003	(Switzerland) Arosa	BA	(Finland) Jukka Erätuli	(Austria) Florian Mausser	(Sweden) Micael Lundmark

== Men's standings ==
Overall
Rank	Name	Points
1	(Canada) Jasey-Jay Anderson	814
2	(Germany) Markus Ebner	588
3	(Austria) Lukas Grüner	411
4	(Austria) Felix Stadler	406
5	(Austria) Alexander Maier	357

Parallel
Rank	Name	Points
1	(France) Mathieu Bozzetto	11050
2	(Slovenia) Dejan Košir	6370
3	(Germany) Markus Ebner	5880
4	(Switzerland) Gilles Jaquet	5530
5	(Switzerland) Philipp Schoch	5490

Snowboard cross
Rank	Name	Points
1	(France) Xavier de Le Rue	5200
2	(Canada) Jasey-Jay Anderson	3330
3	(France) Mickael David	2960
4	(Canada) Drew Neilson	2740
5	(France) Sylvain Duclos	2440

Halfpipe
Rank	Name	Points
1	(Germany) Xaver Hoffmann	5660
2	(Sweden) Magnus Sterner	4400
3	(Japan) Domu Narita	2560
4	(France) Gary Zebrowski	2260
5	(Germany) Vinzenz Lüps	1890

Big air
Rank	Name	Points
1	(Finland) Jukka Erätuli	4260
2	(Finland) Sami Tuoriniemi	4056
3	(Austria) Florian Mausser	2478
4	(Finland) Jaakko Ruha	2410
5	(Finland) Antti Autti	2000

== Women's standings ==
Overall
Rank	Name	Points
1	(France) Karine Ruby	756
2	(Austria) Doresia Krings	621
3	(Austria) Ursula Fingerlos	613
4	(Austria) Manuela Riegler	489
5	(Austria) Doris Günther	471

Parallel
Rank	Name	Points
1	(Switzerland) Ursula Bruhin	8910
2	(Netherlands) Nicolien Sauerbreij	6240
3	(Germany) Heidi Renoth	6080
4	(Austria) Heidi Krings	5800
5	(France) Isabelle Blanc	5660

Snowboard cross
Rank	Name	Points
1	(France) Karine Ruby	4600
2	(Switzerland) Olivia Nobs	3970
3	(France) Déborah Anthonioz	3960
4	(Austria) Ursula Fingerlos	2950
5	(France) Marie Laissus	2560

Halfpipe
Rank	Name	Points
1	(Switzerland) Manuela Pesko	4250
2	(Japan) Sōko Yamaoka	2870
3	(Poland) Paulina Ligocka	2860
4	(Austria) Nicola Pederzolli	2800
5	(United Kingdom) Lesley McKenna	2750

== See also ==
- FIS Snowboarding World Championships 2003
