= FIS Snowboarding World Championships 2001 =

International snowboarding competition

The FIS Snowboarding World Championships 2001 took place between January 22 and January 28 in Madonna di Campiglio, Italy.

== Results ==
=== Men's Results ===
==== Snowboard Cross ====
The Snowboard Cross finals took place on January 28.

Medal	Name	Nation	Qualification Time (Seeding)
1st place, gold medalist(s)	Guillaume Nantermod	Switzerland	
2nd place, silver medalist(s)	Markus Ebner	Germany	
3rd place, bronze medalist(s)	Alexander Maier	Austria	

==== Giant Slalom ====
The Giant Slalom finals took place on January 22.

Medal	Name	Nation	Qualification Time (Seeding)
1st place, gold medalist(s)	Jasey Jay Anderson	Canada	
2nd place, silver medalist(s)	Dejan Kosir	Slovenia	
3rd place, bronze medalist(s)	Walter Feichter	Italy	

==== Parallel Giant Slalom ====
Parallel Giant Slalom finals took place on January 24.

Medal	Name	Nation	Time
1st place, gold medalist(s)	Nicolas Huet	France	
2nd place, silver medalist(s)	Mathieu Chiquet	France	
3rd place, bronze medalist(s)	Anton Pogue	United States	

==== Parallel Slalom ====
The Parallel Slalom finals took place on January 26.

Medal	Name	Nation	Time
1st place, gold medalist(s)	Gilles Jaquet	Switzerland	
2nd place, silver medalist(s)	Daniel Biveson	Sweden	
3rd place, bronze medalist(s)	Stefan Kaltschütz	Austria	

==== Halfpipe ====
The finals took place on January 27.

Medal	Name	Nation	Score
1st place, gold medalist(s)	Kim Christiansen	Norway	
2nd place, silver medalist(s)	Daniel Franck	Norway	
3rd place, bronze medalist(s)	Markus Hurme	Finland	

=== Women's Events ===
==== Snowboard Cross ====
The Snowboard Cross finals took place on January 19.

Medal	Name	Nation	Qualification Time (Seeding)
1st place, gold medalist(s)	Karine Ruby	France	
2nd place, silver medalist(s)	Emmanuelle Duboc	France	
3rd place, bronze medalist(s)	Dominique Vallee	Canada	

==== Giant Slalom ====
The Snowboard Cross finals took place on January 23.

Medal	Name	Nation	Qualification Time (Seeding)
1st place, gold medalist(s)	Karine Ruby	France	
2nd place, silver medalist(s)	Isabelle Blanc	France	
3rd place, bronze medalist(s)	Daigmar Mar Unter der Eggen	Italy	

==== Parallel Giant Slalom ====
Parallel Giant Slalom finals took place on January 25.

Medal	Name	Nation	Time
1st place, gold medalist(s)	Ursula Bruhin	Switzerland	
2nd place, silver medalist(s)	Rosey Fletcher	United States	
3rd place, bronze medalist(s)	Manuela Riegler	Austria	

==== Parallel Slalom ====
The Parallel Slalom finals took place on January 26.

Medal	Name	Nation	Time
1st place, gold medalist(s)	Karine Ruby	France	
2nd place, silver medalist(s)	Isabelle Blanc	France	
3rd place, bronze medalist(s)	Carmen Ranigler	Italy	

==== Halfpipe ====
The finals took place on January 27.

Medal	Name	Nation	Score
1st place, gold medalist(s)	Doriane Vidal	France	
2nd place, silver medalist(s)	Stine Kjeldaas	Norway	
3rd place, bronze medalist(s)	Sari Gronholm	Finland	

== Medal table ==
Place	Country				Total
1	France	5	4	0	9
2	Switzerland	3	0	0	3
3	Norway	1	2	0	3
4	Canada	1	0	1	2
5	Austria	0	0	3	3
5	Italy	0	0	3	1
7	United States	0	1	1	2
8	Finland	0	0	2	2
9	Slovenia	0	1	0	1
9	Sweden	0	1	0	1
11	Germany	0	1	0	1
