= Antti Autti =

Finnish snowboarder (born 1985)

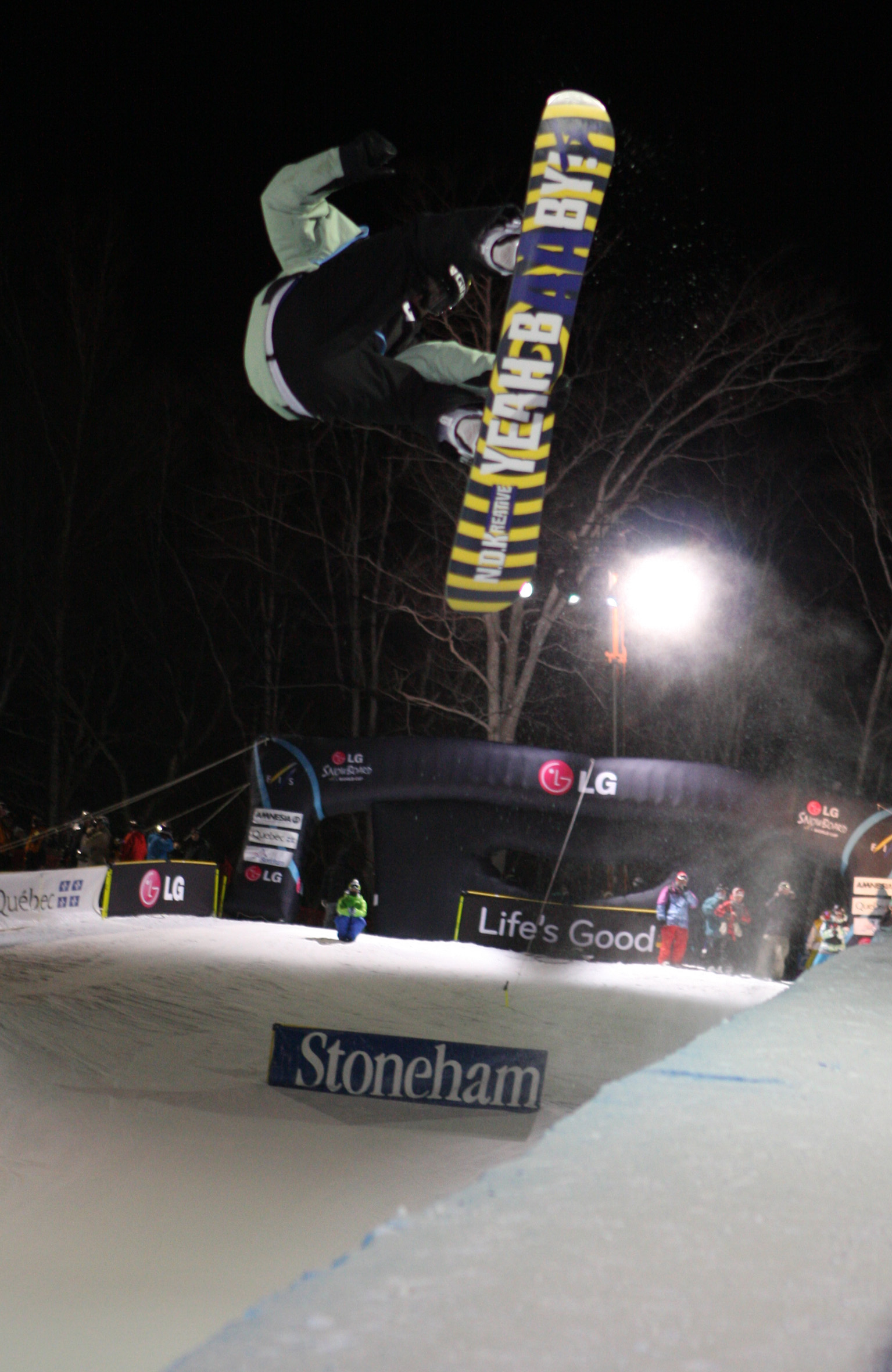
- Autti in Stoneham, 23 January 2010

Personal information
- Full name: Antti-Matias Antero Autti
- Born: 15 March 1985 (age 41) Rovaniemi, Finland
Medal record
Men's snowboarding
Representing Finland
World Championships
Gold medal – first place	2005 Whistler	Halfpipe
Gold medal – first place	2005 Whistler	Big Air
Silver medal – second place	2007 Arosa	Big Air
Bronze medal – third place	2003 Kreischberg	Big Air
Winter X Games
Gold medal – first place	2005 Aspen	Superpipe
Bronze medal – third place	2009 Aspen	Superpipe

Antti-Matias Antero Autti (born 15 March 1985) is a Finnish snowboarder who won the Men's Superpipe at the 2005 Winter X Games. He is one of two snowboarders, along with Steve Fisher, ever to beat American snowboarder Shaun White in the X Games Superpipe.

Autti is the first non-American to win the event. He began his final run with back-to-back 1080s, and is only the third snowboarder to land the sequence in competition, behind Michael McBee and Ross Powers.

His technical performance sparked the "1080 Revolution" and set a new standard in men's halfpipe competition, where athletes must throw at least one 1080, if not two back-to-back, in order to do well in contests. Just two weeks earlier, he was crowned double World Champion in Big Air and the halfpipe at the 2005 Snowboarding World Championships in Whistler, British Columbia, Canada.

== Biography ==
Born to Yrjö and Katariina Autti, Autti hails from Rovaniemi, a 55,000 population city that sits on the Arctic Circle and is considered the gateway to the Lapland region of Finland. Athletic genes run in his family – Autti's younger brother Tuomas is an aspiring freestyle skier, and his uncle is Arto Autti, who was a defender on the Finnish National football team. Autti started snowboarding in spring 1995 after he saw someone snowboarding while on a skiing vacation with his family at the Ylläs ski center in Lapland.

== Career ==
=== 2004–2005 ===
Following his breakthrough at the World Championships and the Winter X Games, Autti went on to finish second at the 2005 Nippon Open, third at the 2005 U.S. Open Snowboarding Championships and first in Big Air at the Arctic Challenge, the exclusive snowboarding event founded by Terje Haakonsen. He was also awarded Best Tweak for his switch backside 540, which is his favorite trick.

In April 2005, it was officially announced that Autti would represent Finland at the 2006 Winter Olympics.

Over the summer of 2005 at the end of July, he competed in Nokia's Totally Board in Taiwan. Autti embarked on Billabong's Freeway Tour in August, which spirits Billabong-sponsored riders to various contests in Australia and New Zealand. He won the Perisher Pipe Cup and took third in the Slopestyle Jam. It was Autti's first time Down Under, and he likes New Zealand's famed Snowpark because it is like a "big playground," and it reminds him of Finland because "you can see everyone from the lift." Australian snowboarders on the Tour, Nick Gregory and Clint Allan, introduced Autti to their country's native wombats and kangaroos and got him addicted to pies.

=== 2005–2006 ===
Autti kicked off the 2005–2006 World Cup season with third and first-place finishes in Valle Nevado, Chile, in September. He followed it in October with a second place podium in Saas-Fee, Switzerland.

During Finland's Annual Skiexpo in November 2005, Autti was awarded Rider of the Year by Slammer Magazine's Riders of the Year Awards. He received the most votes in a readers internet poll. He also finished ninth in Finland's annual Sports Athlete of the Year poll, voted on by sports magazine journalists.

Before the end of 2005, Autti competed in the X-Trail Jam in Japan and finished fifth in the quarterpipe and fourth in the straight jump. For his banner year, he was invited to Finland's President's Ball in December, an annual banquet honoring all of the elite athletes, politicians, celebrities, and public figures in Finland. Autti attended the event with Mattila, where they met the President, Tarja Halonen — who was re-elected for a second term on January 29, 2006 — and her husband Pentti Arajärvi.

Autti competed in the Burton European Open in Laax, Switzerland, in January 2006, taking second place in slopestyle. Two days later, riding with a bruised rib, he finished fourth in the halfpipe.

At the 2006 Winter X Games, the extremely icy pipe proved to be hazardous to numerous riders, including Autti, and he came up short in his defense of his gold medal, finishing sixth.

Two weeks later at the 2006 Winter Olympics, despite a near-flawless run, he finished fifth with a controversial low score of 39.1 that elicited plenty of "boos" from fans in the stands. Bronze medalist and teammate Markku Koski felt the same way, stating it should have been Autti on the podium.

After a two-week stay in Japan, Autti returned to the top of the podium at the Vans Cup at Tahoe in March and pocketed $20,000. He finished the season with a sixth-place finish in the quarterpipe and 10th-place finishes in the halfpipe and slopestyle at the 2006 U.S. Open.

In April 2006, Autti and his Flow teammates swept the TransWorld Team Challenge, taking five awards, including Best Halfpipe Rider for Autti.

In December 2006, he scored third place at the Nokia Air & Style in Munich, Germany. The Air & Style is considered one of the biggest and most prestigious events in Europe.

=== Present ===
Autti has not competed recently and has been more focused on making video of backcountry riding.

== 2008–2009 ==
Autti participated in the Winter X Games 12. He finished third in Best Trick Showdown, seventh in Snowboard Superpipe, and fourth in Snowboard Slopestyle. Most recently he won the 2008 Toyota Big Air Japan beating his fellow Flow teammate Risto Mattila, who came in second place.

== 2009– ==
Autti placed third in the men's superpipe competition in X Games 13.

== Off the snow ==
Autti, who speaks Finnish, English and Swedish, enjoys skateboarding, photography, salmiakki, movies (especially Johnny Depp films) and music. Some of his favorite artists include Turbonegro, The Hellacopters, Led Zeppelin, The Doors, David Bowie, Social Distortion, The Datsuns and Mötley Crüe. He listened to Mötley Crüe's "Kickstart My Heart" — which he dubs "probably the best song ever" — during his gold medal-winning run at the 2005 X Games. Autti's favorite drink is scotch without rocks, and he says he would be a bartender if he were not a snowboarder. He says he cannot define himself as an athlete in the traditional sense because "in my opinion I'm a snowboarder and my own person." The best part of being a professional snowboarder, he feels, is traveling around the world, meeting new people and experiencing new cultures.

Always calm, cool and collected, Autti tries not to stress himself out too much if he is not riding well because he believes it is important to not lose the fun of snowboarding, echoing his advice to future shredders: "It'd be best if people that throw themselves into snowboarding understood what this sport is about. The competitions alone don't mean everything. There'll always be more of them. In my opinion, the fun going-ons and the smile on your face are a lot more important. Doing well's nice, no doubt about it, but it's important that you don't lose the pleasure of the riding itself in the competing."

== Sponsors ==
Autti is sponsored by Billabong, Transform Gloves, Nokia, Shred Optics, Northwave and Drake.
