= Julie Pomagalski =

French snowboarder (1980–2021)

Personal information
- Born: 10 October 1980 La Tronche, France
- Died: 23 March 2021 (aged 40) Gemsstock, Switzerland
- Years active: 1997–2007

Sport
- Sport: Snowboarding
Medal record
Women's snowboarding
Representing France
World Championships
Gold medal – first place	1999 Berchtesgaden	Snowboard cross
Silver medal – second place	2003 Kreischberg	Parallel giant slalom
Junior World Championships
Gold medal – first place	1998 Chamrousse	Giant slalom
Gold medal – first place	2000 Berchtesgaden	Parallel giant slalom
Bronze medal – third place	2000 Berchtesgaden	Parallel slalom

Julie Pomagalski (10 October 1980 – 23 March 2021) was a French snowboarder.

Pomagalski competed at the 2002 Winter Olympics and the 2006 Winter Olympics, where she placed sixth in both parallel giant slalom events. She won a gold medal in snowboard cross at the FIS Snowboarding World Championships 1999, and a silver medal in parallel giant slalom at the FIS Snowboarding World Championships 2003.

Subsequent to her competitive career, Pomagalski operated a ski school and a sports shop in Méribel.

Pomagalski died in an avalanche in Switzerland on 23 March 2021, at age 40.

== Early life ==
Pomagalski was born on 10 October 1980 in La Tronche. She was granddaughter of Polish émigré Jean Pomagalski, founder of the Poma ski lift manufacturing company. She was of Polish-Jewish descent.

== Career ==
=== Beginnings in the World Cup ===
Pomagalski made her international debut in the 1997–98 FIS Snowboard World Cup season, where she placed 46th at an event in Tignes. At the 1998 FIS Snowboarding Junior World Championships in Chamrousse, she won gold in the giant slalom competition. In the 1998 French Championships in Alpe d'Huez, Pomagalski won gold in the snowboard cross and bronze in the giant slalom.

=== World Championships ===
At the 1999 FIS Snowboarding World Championships in Berchtesgaden, she won gold in the snowboard cross competition. At a World Cup event in Grächen, she missed her first podium narrowly, placing 4th. At the 1999 Junior World Championships in Seiser Alm, she finished sixth in the parallel giant slalom.

Shortly after the beginning of the 1999–2000 World Cup season, Pomagalski achieved her first World Cup podium, placing second in a snowboard cross event in Zell am See. At the 2000 Junior World Championships in Berchtesgaden, she earned gold in the parallel giant slalom and bronze in the parallel slalom. At the end of February, Pomagalski earned fourth place in a giant slalom event at the Shiga Highlands. She then finished fourth in a snowboard cross competition in Park City, Utah, and then second in the giant slalom competition there two days later. She ended up not being able to achieve a podium placement for the rest of that season.

Pomagalski began her 2000–01 World Cup season in January 2001 and quickly rose through the ranks to gain second place in Morzine. At the 2001 World Championships in Madonna di Campiglio, however, she was unable to match her previous performances back in Berchtesgaden and did not gain any medals in the three disciplines in which she completed.

=== World Cup discipline victories and Olympic appearance ===
On 24 February 2001, Pomagalski achieved her first World Cup discipline victory in the parallel giant slalom in Asahikawa, Japan. Despite this victory, however, it was only able to get Pomagalski up to 21st place in the overall World Cup ranking. In the 2001–02 season, she started off with a fourth place showing in the parallel giant slalom at Valle Nevado in Chile. By December, she was back on the podium, winning second place in Whistler, British Columbia, Canada, and then her second victory, on Mont-Sainte-Anne in Quebec. This was then followed up by yet another victory, this time in Valloire, France. In January 2002, she placed 2nd in the parallel giant slalom event in Kreischberg, Austria, and then went on to take part in the 2002 Winter Olympics in Salt Lake City, United States, where she reached sixth placed in the parallel giant slalom event. Afterwards, she earned two silver medals for the snowboarding events at Rukatunturi in Finland and Tandadalen in Sälen, Sweden, eventually resulting in her 4th-place ranking in that year's World Cup overall.

At the 2003 World Championships in Kreischberg, Pomagalski placed 2nd in the parallel giant slalom and 10th in the parallel slalom. Shortly afterwards, she won two preparatory competitions for the 2003 Winter Universiade. On 25 January 2003, she placed second in the snowboard cross at Berchtesgaden. In February of that year, she won another World Cup event in the parallel giant slalom at Maribor, Slovenia. She placed 6th overall after further podium places.

=== Overall victory at the World Cup and later retirement ===
Pomagalski had consistently placed in the top 10 for most of the 2003–04 World Cup season, placing first at events in Alpe d'Huez, Le Grand-Bornand, Sapporo, and Bardonecchia. For the first time ever, Pomagalski had earned an overall victory in the World Cup, and also earned second place in the snowboard cross discipline and third place in the parallel ranking as well. In the 2004–05 season, however, she wasn't able to reproduce her successes and never won a competition for the entire season. She placed eighth in the snowboard cross, ninth in the parallel giant slalom, and fifth in the parallel slalom events at the 2005 World Snowboard Championships, this time in Whistler, Canada.

In the 2005–06 World Cup season, Pomagalski was able to win an event again, this time a parallel slalom competition in Landgraaf, located in the Netherlands. She then won a snowboard cross event in Whistler. Afterwards, she competed at the 2006 Winter Olympics in Turin, Italy, where she placed 23rd in the snowboard cross and 6th in the parallel giant slalom. She won another World Cup event in Lake Placid, New York and finished the season with a 2nd-place ranking.

At France's 2006 National Championships in Isola 2000, she won the parallel giant slalom title. During the 2006–07 World Cup season, she placed third in the parallel slalom at an event at Bad Gastein. At the 2007 World Snowboard Championships in Arosa, she placed sixth in the snowboard cross, eighth in the parallel giant slalom, and 21st in the parallel slalom. After she could not achieve consistently good performances for the rest of the season and falling back down to 20th overall, she retired in 2007.

== Outside of sport ==
Pomagalski was the granddaughter of Jean Pomagalski, the founder of the cable car manufacturer Poma and designer of one of the first modern ski lifts.

After studying at the Emlyon Business School from 2003 to 2007 during her sporting career, Pomagalski graduated with a Master of Science degree, and in 2012, after her retirement, she worked in marketing and press at the Méribel tourist office, and later at MDP Consulting, a company that focuses on the development of tourist regions.

She ran the Prosneige ski school and shop, based in Méribel.

Pomagalski was a member of the steering committee of the Fédération Française de Ski and was a member of the Association des Internationaux du Ski Français.

== Death ==
On 23 March 2021, Pomagalski was freeriding with mountain guide Bruno Putelli and two others on Gemsstock when three of the four were struck by a slab avalanche. Pomagalski and Putelli were both buried under the snow and died before emergency services could reach them. The French National Olympic and Sports Committee stated on Twitter that her death had "left the French Olympic team in mourning for one of their own".
