= Alexander Maier =

Austrian snowboarder

Personal information
- Nationality: Austrian
- Born: 16 July 1974 (age 52) Altenmarkt im Pongau, Austria

Sport
- Sport: Snowboarding
Medal record
Representing Austria
FIS Snowboarding World Championships
Bronze medal – third place	2001 Madonna di Campiglio	Snowboard cross

Alexander Maier (born 16 July 1974 in Altenmarkt im Pongau) is an Austrian former snowboarder. He competed in the men's parallel giant slalom event at the 2002 Winter Olympics where he was eliminated in the round of 16 after he finished 2nd in the qualification. Four years later, he competed in the men's parallel giant slalom event at the 2006 Winter Olympics where he was disqualified in the first round of the qualification. He is bronze medallist of the 2001 World Championships in snowboard cross.

Hermann Maier, an Austrian former World Cup champion alpine ski racer and Olympic gold medalist, is his older brother.

== World Cup podiums ==
Date	Location	Event	Rank
2001	(France) Tignes	SBX	3rd
2001	(Germany) Berchtesgaden	PGS	2nd
2001	(United States) Park City	PGS	1st
2001	(Finland) Ruka	PSL	1st
2002	(Chile) Valle Nevado	PSL	3rd
2002	(Switzerland) Arosa	PGS	1st
2003	(Austria) Sölden	PGS	3rd
2004	(Austria) Sölden	PGS	3rd
2004	(Switzerland) Arosa	SBX	3rd
