= FIS Snowboarding World Championships 2003 =

International snowboarding competition

The FIS Snowboarding World Championships 2003 took place between January 13 and January 19 in Kreischberg, Austria.

== Results ==
=== Men's results ===
==== Snowboard Cross ====
The Snowboard Cross finals took place on January 19.

Medal	Name	Nation	Qualification Time (Seeding)
1st place, gold medalist(s)	Xavier de Le Rue	France	
2nd place, silver medalist(s)	Seth Wescott	United States	
3rd place, bronze medalist(s)	Drew Neilson	Canada	

==== Parallel Giant Slalom ====
Parallel Giant Slalom finals took place on January 13.

Medal	Name	Nation	Time
1st place, gold medalist(s)	Dejan Kosir	Slovenia	
2nd place, silver medalist(s)	Simon Schoch	Switzerland	
3rd place, bronze medalist(s)	Nicolas Huet	France	

==== Parallel Slalom ====
The Parallel Slalom finals took place on January 14.

Medal	Name	Nation	Time
1st place, gold medalist(s)	Siegfried Grabner	Austria	
2nd place, silver medalist(s)	Mathieu Bozzetto	France	
3rd place, bronze medalist(s)	Simon Schoch	Switzerland	

==== Halfpipe ====
The finals took place on January 17.

Medal	Name	Nation	Score
1st place, gold medalist(s)	Markus Keller	Switzerland	
2nd place, silver medalist(s)	Stefan Karlsson	Sweden	
3rd place, bronze medalist(s)	Steven Fisher	United States	

==== Big Air ====
Big Air finals took place on January 18.

Medal	Name	Nation	Score
1st place, gold medalist(s)	Risto Mattila	Finland	
2nd place, silver medalist(s)	Simon Ax	Sweden	
3rd place, bronze medalist(s)	Antti Autti	Finland	

=== Women's results ===
==== Snowboard Cross ====
The Snowboard Cross finals took place on January 19.

Medal	Name	Nation	Qualification Time (Seeding)
1st place, gold medalist(s)	Karine Ruby	France	
2nd place, silver medalist(s)	Ursula Fingerlos	Austria	
3rd place, bronze medalist(s)	Victoria Wicky	France	

==== Parallel Giant Slalom ====
Parallel Giant Slalom finals took place on January 13.

Medal	Name	Nation	Time
1st place, gold medalist(s)	Ursula Bruhin	Switzerland	
2nd place, silver medalist(s)	Julie Pomagalski	France	
3rd place, bronze medalist(s)	Heidi Renoth	Germany	

==== Parallel Slalom ====
The Parallel Slalom finals took place on January 15.

Medal	Name	Nation	Time
1st place, gold medalist(s)	Isabelle Blanc	France	
2nd place, silver medalist(s)	Karine Ruby	France	
3rd place, bronze medalist(s)	Sara Fischer	Sweden	

==== Halfpipe ====
The finals took place on January 16.

Medal	Name	Nation	Score
1st place, gold medalist(s)	Doriane Vidal	France	
2nd place, silver medalist(s)	Nicola Pederzolli	Austria	
3rd place, bronze medalist(s)	Fabienne Reuteler	Switzerland	

== Medal table ==
Place	Country				Total
1	France	4	3	2	9
2	Switzerland	2	1	2	5
3	Austria	1	2	0	3
4	Finland	1	0	1	2
5	Slovenia	1	0	0	1
6	Sweden	0	2	1	3
7	United States	0	1	1	2
8	Canada	0	0	1	1
8	Germany	0	0	1	1
