= Daniel Biveson =

Swedish snowboarder (born 1976)

Medal record

Representing Sweden

Men's Snowboarding

FIS Snowboarding World Championships
Silver medal – second place	2001 Madonna di Campiglio	Parallel Slalom

Daniel Biveson (born 16 December 1976 in Lidingö, Stockholm County) is a Swedish snowboarder (Alpine). Biveson competes on the snowboard cross World Cup tour and has tallied 18 podium appearances and four World Cup wins. His first win was in 2001 in Ischgl, Austria.

Biveson has represented Sweden in Men's Parallel Giant Slalom at the 2002 Winter Olympics in Salt Lake City, at the 2006 Winter Olympics in Turin, and at the 2010 Winter Olympics in Vancouver. Both in Salt Lake City and Turin, as well as in Vancouver, he qualified for the elimination round but lost in the Round of 16, finishing 16th, 11th and 14th respectively.

His wife Aprilia Hägglöf is a former international snowboarder.

== World Cup victories ==
FIS Snowboard World Cup victories: 4 (2 Parallel Slalom, 2 Parallel Giant Slalom).

Date	Location	Race
2001	(Switzerland) Ischgl	Parallel Slalom
2002	(Sweden) Tandadalen	Parallel Giant Slalom
2003	(France) Serre Chevalier	Parallel Slalom
2006	(Japan) Furano	Parallel Giant Slalom
