= Mathieu Bozzetto =

French snowboarder (born 1973)

Personal information
- Full name: Mathieu René Bozzetto
- Born: 16 November 1973 (age 52) Chambéry, Savoie, France
- Height: 186 cm (6 ft 1 in)
- Weight: 90 kg (198 lb)
Medal record
Men's snowboarding
Representing France
Olympic Games
Bronze medal – third place	2010 Vancouver	Parallel giant slalom
FIS Snowboarding World Championships
Silver medal – second place	1999 Berchtesgaden	Parallel Slalom
Silver medal – second place	2003 Kreischberg	Parallel Slalom

Mathieu René Bozzetto (born 16 November 1973) is a professional snowboarder from France. His specialties are the parallel slalom and parallel giant slalom.

== Career highlights ==
Olympic Winter Games
1998 – Nagano, 5th at giant slalom
2002 – Salt Lake City, 6th at parallel giant slalom
2006 – Torino, 4th at parallel giant slalom
2010 – Vancouver, (bronze) Bronze medal at parallel giant slalom
FIS World Snowboard Championships
1997 – Innichen, 4th at giant slalom
1999 – Berchtesgaden, 14th at giant slalom
1999 – Berchtesgaden, 13th at parallel gs
1999 – Berchtesgaden, (silver) 2nd at parallel slalom
2001 – Madonna di Campiglio, 86th at giant slalom
2001 – Madonna di Campiglio, 5th at parallel slalom
2001 – Madonna di Campiglio, 8th at parallel gs
2003 – Kreischberg, 4th at parallel giant slalom
2003 – Kreischberg, 2nd (silver) at parallel slalom
2007 – Arosa, 10th at parallel gs
2007 – Arosa, 5th at parallel slalom
World Cup
1998 – Grächen, (silver) 2nd at giant slalom
1998 – Tandadalen, (silver) 2nd at parallel gs
1998 – Ischgl, (bronze) 3rd at parallel slalom
1999 – Morzine, (gold) 1st at parallel slalom
1999 – Morzine, (silver) 2nd at parallel gs
1999 – Park City, (gold) 1st at parallel slalom
1999 – Park City, (bronze) 3rd at giant slalom
1999 – Asahikawa, (gold) 1st at parallel slalom
1999 – Naeba, (silver) 2nd at parallel slalom
1999 – Olang, (gold) 1st at parallel gs
1999 – Olang, (gold) 1st at parallel slalom
1999 – Whistler, (gold) 1st at giant slalom
1999 – Mont-Sainte-Anne, (gold) 1st at giant slalom
2000 – Morzine, (gold) 1st at parallel slalom
2000 – Berchtesgaden, (gold) 1st at parallel slalom
2000 – Gstaad, (silver) 2nd at giant slalom
2000 – Tandadalen, (gold) 1st at parallel gs
2000 – Tandadalen, (gold) 1st at parallel slalom
2000 – Ischgl, (gold) 1st at parallel slalom (1)
2000 – Livigno, (gold) 1st at parallel slalom
2000 – Livigno, (gold) 1st at giant slalom
2000 – Ischgl, (gold) 1st at parallel slalom (2)
2001 – Kreischberg, (gold) 1st at parallel slalom
2001 – Bad Gastein, (bronze) 3rd at parallel slalom
2001 – München, (bronze) 3rd at parallel slalom
2001 – Berchtesgaden, (gold) 1st at parallel slalom
2001 – Berchtesgaden, (bronze) 3rd at parallel gs
2001 – Ruka, (bronze) 3rd at parallel gs
2001 – Valle Nevado, (gold) 1st at parallel slalom
2001 – Tignes, (bronze) 3rd at parallel gs
2001 – Ischgl, (gold) 1st at parallel gs
2001 – Mont-Sainte-Anne, (gold) 1st at parallel slalom
2002 – Arosa, (bronze) 3rd at parallel gs
2002 – Sapporo, (gold) 1st at parallel gs
2002 – Sapporo, (silver) 2nd at parallel slalom
2002 – Ruka, (bronze) 3rd at parallel slalom
2002 – Sölden, (gold) 1st at parallel gs
2002 – Sölden, (gold) 1st at parallel slalom
2002 – Tandadalen, (silver) 2nd at parallel slalom
2002 – Whistler, (gold) 1st at parallel slalom
2002 – Stoneham, (gold) 1st at parallel gs
2003 – Bad Gastein, (gold) 1st at parallel slalom
2003 – Maribor, (bronze) 3rd at parallel slalom
2003 – Sapporo, (gold) 1st at parallel gs
2003 – Sapporo, (gold) 1st at parallel slalom
2003 – Serre Chevalier, (bronze) 3rd at parallel gs
2003 – Serre Chevalier, (bronze) 3rd at parallel slalom
2003 – Arosa, (silver) 2nd at parallel gs
2003 – Stoneham, (silver) 2nd at parallel gs
2004 – Bad Gastein, (silver) 2nd at parallel slalom
2004 – Alpe d'Huez, (gold) 1st at parallel gs
2004 – Sapporo, (gold) 1st at parallel gs
2004 – Sapporo, (gold) 1st at parallel slalom
2004 – Mount Bachelor, (silver) 2nd at parallel gs
2004 – Bardonecchia, (silver) 2nd at parallel gs
2005 – Sierra Nevada, (silver) 2nd at parallel slalom
2006 – Kreischberg, (silver) 2nd at parallel gs
2006 – Shukolovo, (silver) 2nd at parallel slalom
2007 – Nendaz, (silver) 2nd at parallel slalom (1)
2007 – Sungwoo, (bronze) 3rd at parallel gs
2007 – Landgraaf, (gold) 1st at parallel slalom
2007 – Nendaz, (gold) 1st at parallel slalom (2)
2008 – Bad Gastein, (gold) 1st at parallel slalom
South American Cup
2000 – Cerro Catedral, (gold) 1st at parallel gs
FIS Races
2000 – Chapelco, (gold) 1st at parallel gs
2001 – Alpe d'Huez, (gold) 1st at parallel gs
2002 – Chamonix, (gold) 1st at parallel gs
