= Snowboarding at the 2002 Winter Olympics =

Snowboarding at the XIX Olympic Winter Games
- Venue: Park City Mountain Resort
- Dates: 10–15 February 2002
- Competitors: 118 from 19 nations

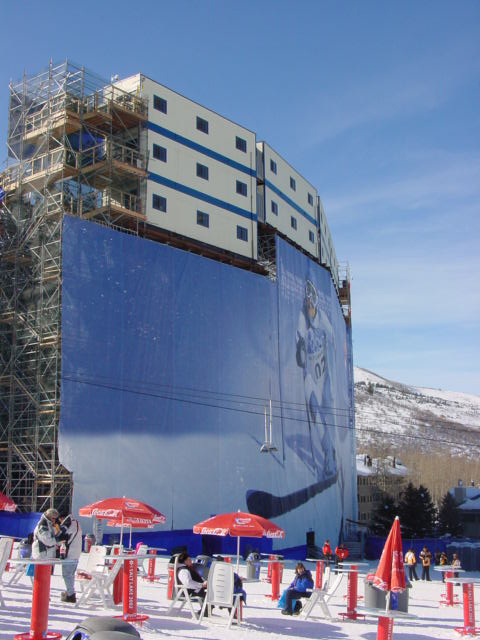
Snowboard spectator stadium at Park City Mountain Resort.

The 2002 Winter Olympic Games Snowboarding competition consisted of men's and women's halfpipe and parallel giant slalom events. The snowboarding competition took place at Park City, over a five-day period.

== Medal summary ==
=== Medal table ===
Rank	Nation	Gold	Silver	Bronze	Total
1	United States	2	1	2	5
2	France	1	2	0	3
3	Switzerland	1	0	1	2
4	Sweden	0	1	0	1
5	Italy	0	0	1	1
Totals (5 entries)		4	4	4	12

=== Men's events ===
Event	Gold		Silver		Bronze	
Halfpipe	Ross Powers; United States	46.1	Danny Kass; United States	42.5	Jarret Thomas; United States	42.1
Parallel giant slalom	Philipp Schoch; Switzerland		Richard Richardsson; Sweden		Chris Klug; United States	

=== Women's events ===
Event	Gold		Silver		Bronze	
Halfpipe	Kelly Clark; United States	47.9	Doriane Vidal; France	43.0	Fabienne Reuteler; Switzerland	39.7
Parallel giant slalom	Isabelle Blanc; France		Karine Ruby; France		Lidia Trettel; Italy	

== Participating NOCs ==
Nineteen nations competed in the snowboarding events at Salt Lake City.

- Australia (1)
- Austria (9)
- Canada (9)
- Spain (1)
- Finland (7)
- France (12)
- Germany (9)
- Great Britain (1)
- Italy (10)
- Japan (15)
- Netherlands (1)
- Norway (7)
- Poland (2)
- Russia (1)
- Slovenia (2)
- Slovakia (1)
- Sweden (11)
- Switzerland (12)
- United States (14)
