= X-Trail Jam =

The X-Trail Jam is a Japanese snowboarding contest and one of the biggest of its kind worldwide. It was first launched in the Tokyo Dome, Japan in 2001 and is now held annually. President and main developer is Reto Lamm.

== Winners ==
Years	Quarter Pipe	Straight Jump
2001 January	Terje Håkonsen	Michi Albin
2001 December	Terje Håkonsen	Jonas Emery
2002	Heikki Sorsa	Travis Rice
2003	Terje Håkonsen	Gian Simmen
2004	Andy Finch	Heikki Sorsa
2005	Terje Håkonsen	Jonas Emery
2006	Shaun White	Travis Rice
2007	Travis Rice	Risto Mattila
2008	Shaun White	Torstein Horgmo
