= Arctic Challenge =

Snowboarding competition

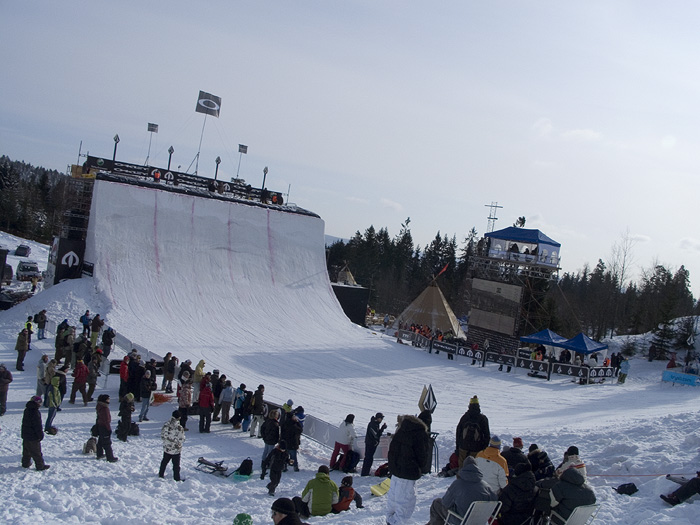
Monsterpipe from 2006 Arctic Challenge

The Arctic Challenge is a snowboarding contest arranged for and by the riders themselves. It was started by Norwegian professional snowboarders Daniel Franck and Terje Håkonsen. The contest was established as an alternative to the former competitions that had become streamlined and run by schedules and directions from TV-coverage, major sponsors and other external forces. It formerly held the status as the final for the "World Snowboard Tour", and is held in Norway annually - usually at a location north of the Arctic Circle.

Since 2005 the "TAC", as it is often referred to, moved to Oslo and has been integrated into the TTR World Snowboard Tour at the 5Star level. Oslo is south of the Arctic Circle, and is thus not in the arctic.

Due to its great success last season it has moved to the TTR 6Star level, the highest status an event can hold on the World Tour, giving out 1000 TTR ranking points to the winner and $100,000 in total prize money. It is now the only 6Star rated event owned by a professional rider.

At the Arctic Challenge 2007, the organizer and snowboard legend, Terje Håkonsen broke the highest air record in the quarterpipe with 9.8 m above the lip (top part of the obstacle), established by Heikki Sorsa at 9.3 m in 2001.
