= Ursula Bruhin =

Swiss snowboarder

Medal record

Women's snowboarding

Representing Switzerland

FIS Snowboarding World Championships
Gold medal – first place	2001 Madonna di Campiglio	Parallel Giant Slalom
Gold medal – first place	2003 Kreischberg	Parallel Giant Slalom

Ursula Bruhin (born 19 March 1970) is a Swiss snowboarder, World Champion in Parallel Giant Slalom in 2001 and 2003.
