= Xavier de Le Rue =

French snowboarder (born 1979)

Medal record

Men's snowboarding

Representing France

World Championships
Gold medal – first place	2003 Kreischberg	Snowboard Cross
Gold medal – first place	2007 Arosa	Snowboard Cross
Silver medal – second place	2009 Gangwon	Snowboard Cross

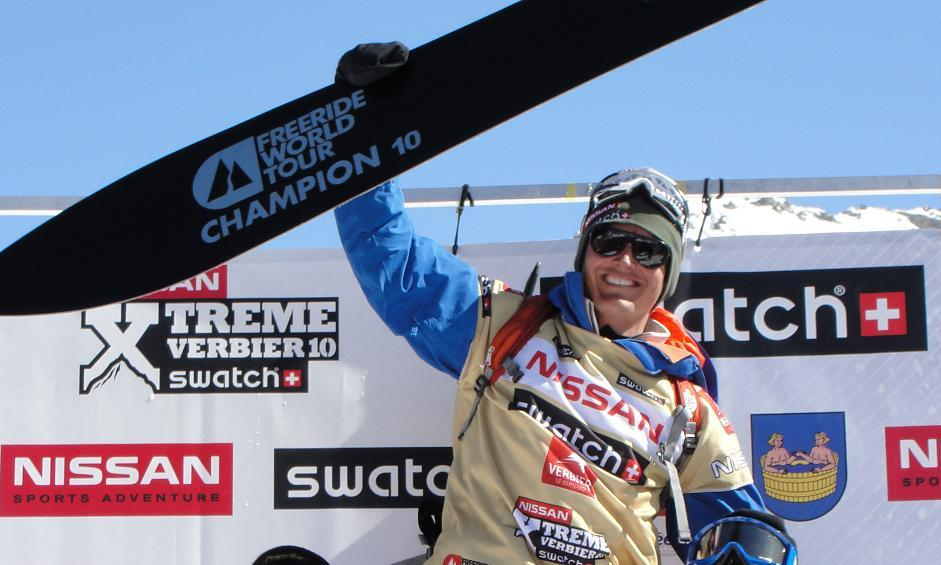
Winner of Freeride World Tour 2010 (snowboard)

Xavier de Le Rue (born 1 July 1979) is a French big mountain snowboarder, who started his pro career competing on the Boardercross pro tour (organized at the time by the International Snowboard Federation). He competed for France at the 2006 Winter Olympics, but did not advance to the quarterfinals. At the FIS Snowboarding World Championships 2009 he won a silver medal. He is set to compete for France at the 2010 Winter Olympics. He is the brother of bronze medalist Paul-Henri de Le Rue.

In 2010 he was nominated as a "stand out of the year" at 11th TransWorld SNOWboarding Rider Poll during SnowSports Industries America (SIA)'s Snow Show in Denver and 2010 Snowboarder Magazine Big Mountain Rider of The Year. Furthermore, in March 2010, he won the Nissan Xtreme in Verbier with a new line, including a cliff that was never jumped before during this competition. With this victory, De Le Rue won the Freeride World Tour for the third time in a row.
