= Risto Mattila =

Finnish snowboarder

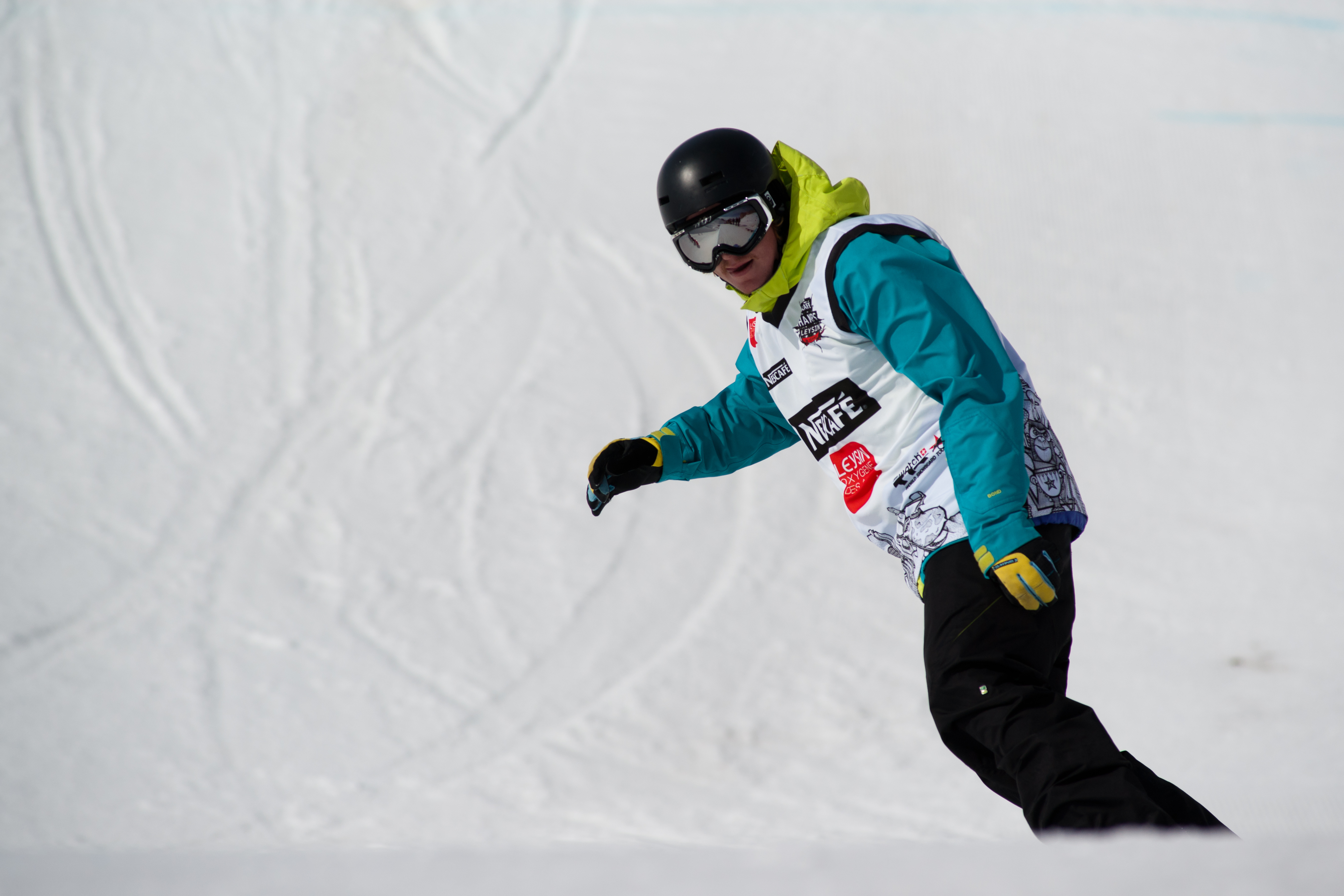
Risto Mattila

Risto Mattila (born 4 February 1981, Kannus, Central Ostrobothnia) is a Finnish snowboarder. He is an all-around rider, who has many achievements in half pipe, big air and in park riding contests. He has also made a name by having shots in the international snowboarding magazines. He is well known as a confident rider and because of his smooth style.

== Biography ==
Mattila was born in Kannus, which is located in Central Ostrobothnia which is well known for its flat surface. Risto started snowboarding at the age of 13 in a small resort called Louekallio, together with Olympic bronze medallist Markku Koski.

== Career ==
During his snowboard career Risto has obtained many good results, including many wins in FIS world cup and other snowboarding invitational contests.

Mattila participated in the 2002 Winter Olympics in Salt Lake City, finishing 16th in men's halfpipe. He also represented Finland at the 2006 Winter Olympics in Turin, finishing 10th in men's halfpipe.

Mattila's 2006–2007 season has started promisingly, and Risto has placed as a second in Air & Style and third in X-Trail Jam, both much respected competitions in the snowboarding world. Mattila also won the 2007 Nissan X-Trail Big Air in Japan

Most recently Mattila participated in the 2008 Toyota Big Air and placed 2nd to his fellow Flow teammate and friend Antti Autti

== Off the snow ==
When Risto is not snowboarding he usually spends time in Helsinki with his friends. He likes Finnish candies, good food, ketchup and movies. His hobbies besides snowboarding are skateboarding, breakdance and tennis.

== Career Standings ==
2001/2002

- 2nd FIS World Cup overall Half Pipe
- 2nd FIS Big Air
- 16th Salt Lake City Winter Olympics

2003/2004

- World Cup overall winner
- 1st World Cup Big Air
- 3rd Big Air
- 1st Leysin Open slope style
- 2nd Burton European open slope style
- 3rd The Arctic challenge Half-pipe

2005/2006

- TTR ranking 2nd
- 4 World cup wins,
- Us Open winner, overall and slope style,
- Nippon Open pipe 3rd,
- Gravity Games Pipe 3rd,
- SB-Jam 3 rd overall and the ruler of the kicker,
- Arctic Challenge 3rd Big Air,
- 2nd Freestyle CH Zurich,
- 2nd Nokia Air & Style 06 Munich

2007/2008

- Won 07 Nissan X-Trail Big Air Japan,
- 2nd Toyota Big Air

== Sponsors ==
Flow Snowboarding, Giro, Volvo, Billabong, Dr. Zipe, Northwave Drake Bindings and Boards
