= Fabienne Reuteler =

Swiss snowboarder

Medal record

Representing Switzerland

Women's snowboarding

Olympic Games
Bronze medal – third place	2002 Salt Lake City	Halfpipe

FIS Snowboarding World Championships
Bronze medal – third place	2003 Kreischberg	Halfpipe

Fabienne Reuteler (born 2 September 1979) is a Swiss snowboarder and Olympic medalist. She received a bronze medal at the 2002 Winter Olympics in Salt Lake City.
