= Giacomo Kratter =

Italian snowboarder

Personal information
- Nationality: Italian
- Born: 26 July 1982 (age 42); Udine, Italy

Sport
- Sport: Snowboarding

Giacomo Kratter (born 26 July 1982) is an Italian snowboarder. He competed at the 2002 Winter Olympics and the 2006 Winter Olympics.
