= Yoko Miyake =

Japanese snowboarder (born 1973)

Personal information
- Nationality: Japanese
- Born: 22 December 1973 (age 51); Hyogo, Japan

Sport
- Sport: Snowboarding

Yoko Miyake (born 22 December 1973) is a Japanese snowboarder. She competed in the women's halfpipe event at the 2002 Winter Olympics.
