= Rosey Fletcher =

American snowboarder

Medal record

Women's snowboarding

Representing the United States

Olympic Games
Bronze medal – third place	2006 Turin	Parallel giant slalom

FIS Snowboarding World Championships
Silver medal – second place	1999 Berchtesgaden	Parallel giant slalom
Silver medal – second place	2001 Madonna di Campiglio	Parallel giant slalom

Gabrielle Rose "Rosey" Fletcher (born 30 November 1975, in Anchorage, Alaska) is an American three-time Olympian snowboarder. She competed at the 1998 Winter Olympics, the 2002 Winter Olympics, and the 2006 Winter Olympics. Fletcher won the Olympic bronze medal in the 2006 women's Parallel giant slalom event.

== Early life ==
Fletcher grew up in Girdwood, Alaska. She started skiing cross-country, then moved to alpine racing, GS, and Super-G. Then she tried snowboarding and focused on GS. In 2007, she was studying to compete her degree at Eastern Oregon University.

== Career ==
=== Olympics ===
Fletcher competed at the 1998 Winter Olympics in Nagano, the 2002 Winter Olympics in Salt Lake City, and the 2006 Winter Olympics in Turin, Italy. Fletcher won the Olympic bronze medal in the 2006 women's Parallel giant slalom event.

Arriving as a favourite in 1998 at Nagano and in 2002 at Salt Lake City, she crashed in 1998 and suffered a near-crash in 2002 during the preliminaries. Going into the 2002 games at Utah’s Park City, she was ranked 8th in the world. In Turin, at the 2006 Winter Games, she was 30 but with no pressure to perform she advanced to the semifinals. But later crashed, and was left fighting for a bronze medal which she easily won. “I was so devastated after Salt Lake I thought my life was going to end. It was one of those life lessons, realizing that life’s a lot bigger than this five-ring circus,” was her quote after the 2002 loss.

=== Snowboarding career ===
Fletcher also won seven US national championships, two silver medals in parallel giant slalom at the 1999 and 2001 World Championships, eight World Cup victories, and had 20 World Cup podium finishes. She was on the USA Snowboard Team for ten years.

One of her first podiums in the World Cup came in December 1996 in giant slalom at Sestriere, Italy and at Sun Peak BC at Canada in the same month. Her first victory in a World Cup, came in the next year in 1997 at Bardonechhia, Italy in giant slalom. She bagged two more FIS victories in giant slalom and slalom at Mammoth Mountain, USA. From 1996 to 2006, she won 44 podium places in all championships including World Cups, World Championships and FIS events like Nor Am Cups.

=== Litigation ===
In February 2023, Fletcher and other former U.S. Ski & Snowboard (USSS) team members sued coach Peter Foley, along with the national federation, its former CEO, and the USOPC, in U.S. District Court in Los Angeles for sex trafficking, harassment, and enabling and covering up repeated acts of sexual assault and misconduct, alleging that the defendants "conspired and acted in concert with one another to commit unlawful acts." They alleged that Foley exploited his position of trust to "coerce sexual acts through force, manipulation, emotional abuse, intimidation, and retaliation." Fletcher said that Foley sexually assaulted her at a U.S. team camp when she was 19, and again at a post-race event at the Olympics. Foley and the other defendants asked the court to throw out the lawsuit; a hearing is set for October 2023.

Separately, on August 8, 2023, after an 18-month investigation, SafeSport suspended Foley for ten years for sexual misconduct.

=== Retired life ===
Fletcher became a community development specialist in her hometown of Anchorage in Alaska, after retirement.

=== Honours ===
- On March 5, 2006, in Soldotna, Alaska, Fletcher received the honor of lighting the cauldron in the opening ceremony of the Kenai Peninsula 2006 Arctic Winter Games.
- Fletcher was inducted into the Alaska Sports Hall of Fame in 2010.
