= Karine Ruby =

French snowboarder

Medal record

Women's snowboarding

Representing France

Olympic Games
Gold medal – first place	1998 Nagano	Giant slalom
Silver medal – second place	2002 Salt Lake City	Parallel giant slalom

FIS Snowboarding World Championships
Gold medal – first place	1996 Lienz	Giant slalom
Gold medal – first place	1997 Innichen	Snowboard cross
Gold medal – first place	2001 Madonna di Campiglio	Snowboard cross
Gold medal – first place	2001 Madonna di Campiglio	Giant slalom
Gold medal – first place	2001 Madonna di Campiglio	Parallel slalom
Gold medal – first place	2003 Kreischberg	Snowboard cross
Silver medal – second place	1997 Innichen	Giant slalom
Silver medal – second place	1997 Innichen	Parallel slalom
Silver medal – second place	2003 Kreischberg	Parallel slalom
Silver medal – second place	2005 Whistler	Snowboard cross

Winter X Games
Bronze medal – third place	2005 Aspen	Snowboard cross

Karine Ruby (4 January 1978 in Bonneville, Haute-Savoie – 29 May 2009) was a French snowboarder and Olympic champion. She won two medals at the Winter Olympics, with a gold medal at the 1998 Winter Olympics in Nagano, and a silver medal at the 2002 Winter Olympics in Salt Lake City. She also earned six gold medals and four silver medals at the FIS Snowboard World Championships, and 67 wins and 122 podiums at the FIS Snowboard World Cup, which earned her the description by The New York Times as "the most decorated female snowboarder in the world".

Ruby won the giant slalom event in the snowboarding competition at the 1998 Winter Olympics held in Nagano, Japan, overcoming severe weather conditions to win the first Olympic gold medal awarded in the event to a woman. She finished a combined 1.74 seconds behind Isabelle Blanc in the parallel giant slalom in snowboarding competition at the 2002 Winter Olympics in Salt Lake City, an event that the two French snowboarders had dedicated to the memory of teammate Régine Cavagnoud, who had died in a 2001 training accident.

Ruby came in third place to win a bronze medal in snowboardcross at the Winter X Games IX held in Aspen, Colorado in January 2005. She competed in the snowboardcross event at the 2006 Winter Olympics in Turin, Italy, and retired from the sport after being eliminated in the quarterfinals.

Ruby was training to become a mountain guide, a process that can take as long as 15 years, and was killed at age 31 on 29 May 2009 after a climbing accident in the Mont Blanc massif. Having climbed the Tour Ronde, she fell into a 70-foot-wide crevasse (21 m) in the glacier du Geant at around 3,300 m, dragging in two other members of the climbing party she had been leading who had all been roped to each other. One man was killed in the fall, while another sustained serious injuries and was hospitalized after being evacuated by helicopter, although died later that night.
