= Nicolas Huet (snowboarder) =

French snowboarder (born 1976)

Medal record

Men's snowboarding

Representing France

World Championships
Gold medal – first place	1999 Berchtesgaden	Parallel Slalom
Gold medal – first place	2001 Madonna di Campiglio	Parallel GS
Silver medal – second place	2005 Whistler	Parallel Slalom
Bronze medal – third place	2003 Kreischberg	Parallel GS
Bronze medal – third place	2005 Whistler	Parallel GS

Nicolas Huet (born 22 July 1976) is a French snowboarder who competed in parallel giant slalom at the 2002 Winter Olympics, where he placed 4th, and 2006 Winter Olympics, where he placed 10th. He was born in Nice, France.

Huet also competed at the World Snowboard Championships from 1999 through 2005:

Year	Location	Event	Place
1999 World Snowboard Championships	Berchtesgaden, Germany	Parallel Slalom	1
2001 World Snowboard Championships	Madonna di Campiglio, Italy	Parallel Giant Slalom	1
2003 World Snowboard Championships	Kreischberg, Austria	Parallel Giant Slalom	3
2005 World Snowboard Championships	Whistler, Canada	Parallel Slalom	2
2005 World Snowboard Championships	Whistler, Canada	Parallel Giant Slalom	3
