= Xaver Hoffmann =

German snowboarder

Personal information
- Nationality: German
- Born: 22 November 1974 (age 50); Munich, Germany

Sport
- Sport: Snowboarding

Xaver Hoffmann (born 22 November 1974) is a German snowboarder. He competed at the 1998 Winter Olympics, the 2002 Winter Olympics and the 2006 Winter Olympics.
