= Doriane Vidal =

French snowboarder (born 1976)

Medal record

Representing France

Women's snowboarding

Olympic Games
Silver medal – second place	2002 Salt Lake City	Halfpipe

FIS Snowboarding World Championships
Gold medal – first place	2001 Madonna di Campiglio	Halfpipe
Gold medal – first place	2003 Kreischberg	Halfpipe
Gold medal – first place	2005 Whistler	Halfpipe
Silver medal – second place	1999 Berchtesgaden	Halfpipe

Winter X Games
Silver medal – second place	2005 Aspen	Superpipe

Doriane Vidal (born 16 April 1976) is a French snowboarder and Olympic medalist. She received a silver medal in halfpipe at the 2002 Winter Olympics in Salt Lake City.

She finished 8th in the halfpipe event at the 2006 Winter Olympics in Turin.
