= Michiyo Hashimoto =

Japanese snowboarder (born 1972)

Personal information
- Nationality: Japanese
- Born: 6 July 1972 (age 52); Neyagawa, Japan

Sport
- Sport: Snowboarding

Michiyo Hashimoto (born 6 July 1972) is a Japanese snowboarder. She competed in the women's halfpipe event at the 2002 Winter Olympics.
