= Nagako Mori =

Japanese snowboarder (born 1975)

Nagako Mori (森 奈賀子, Mori Nagako; born September 15, 1975 in Tokyo) is a snowboarder from Chiba, Japan, specializing in halfpipe riding. She works in finance and lives in Tokyo, Japan. She was a member of the Japanese National team at the 2002 Salt Lake City Winter Olympics. Nagako competed 10 years in competitive snowboarding around the world and now enjoys casual snowboarding in Japan. She is studying to obtain an accounting license in Japan and also helping with snowboarding tours from Tokyo in the winter.

== Competitive history highlights ==
- 4th Nationals at Takaifuji, 2007
- 26th FIS National Championships in Tsubetu, 2006
- 2nd FIS National Championships in Ajigasawa, 2002
- 22nd Winter Olympic Games in Park City, 2002
- 4th FIS World Cup in Berchtesgaden, Germany, 2001
- 3rd FIS World Cup in Whistler, Canada, 2000
- 4th FIS World Cup in Sapporo, Japan, 2000
