= Vinzenz Lüps =

German snowboarder (born 1981)

Personal information
- Nationality: German
- Born: 26 February 1981 (age 44); Munich, Germany

Sport
- Sport: Snowboarding

Vinzenz Lüps (born 26 February 1981) is a German snowboarder. He competed in the men's halfpipe event at the 2006 Winter Olympics.
