= Stefan Karlsson (snowboarder) =

Swedish snowboarder

Personal information
- Nationality: Swedish
- Born: 26 March 1981 (age 44); Falun, Sweden

Sport
- Sport: Snowboarding

Stefan Karlsson (born 26 March 1981) is a Swedish snowboarder. He competed at the 2002 Winter Olympics and the 2006 Winter Olympics.
