= Gilles Jaquet =

Swiss snowboarder

Medal record

Men's snowboarding

Representing Switzerland

FIS Snowboarding World Championships
Gold medal – first place	2001 Madonna di Campiglio	Parallel Slalom

Gilles Jaquet (born 16 June 1974 in La Chaux-de-Fonds) is a Swiss snowboarder. Jaquet has competed since 1990 and was World Champion in 2001 (Giant Slalom) and 2002. He has also competed at three Olympic Games.
