= Dejan Košir =

Slovenian snowboarder (born 1973)

Medal record

Representing Slovenia

Men's Snowboarding

FIS Snowboarding World Championships
Gold medal – first place	2003 Kreischberg	Parallel GS
Silver medal – second place	2001 Madonna di Campiglio	Giant Slalom

Dejan Košir (born 30 January 1973 in Jesenice, SR Slovenia), is a former Slovenian snowboarder.

Košir competed at 2002 and 2006 Winter Olympics. He won 11 races in the World cup, in parallel slalom and giant slalom. In 2003, Košir was awarded Slovenian Sportsman of the year.

Olympic Games
Preceded by Primož Peterka	Flagbearer for Slovenia; Salt Lake City 2002	Succeeded by Tadeja Brankovič-Likozar
