= Lukas Gruener =

Austrian snowboarder

Personal information
- Nationality: Austrian
- Born: October 18, 1981 (age 43)

Sport
- Sport: Snowboarding

Lukas Gruener (born 18 October 1981, in Zams) is an Austrian snowboarder. He competed in the men's snowboard cross event at the 2006 Winter Olympics, placing nineteenth, and the 2010 Winter Olympics, placing sixth.
