= Carmen Ranigler =

Italian snowboarder

Personal information
- Nationality: Italian
- Born: 17 August 1976 (age 50) Bolzano, Italy

Sport
- Country: Italy
- Sport: Snowboarding

Carmen Ranigler (born 17 August 1976) is an Italian snowboarder.

She was born in Bolzano. She competed at the 2006 Winter Olympics, in snowboard cross and parallel giant slalom. She competed in parallel giant slalom at the 2010 Winter Olympics.
