= Marie Laissus =

French snowboarder (born 1978)

Personal information
- Nationality: French
- Born: 7 February 1978 (age 47); Moûtiers, Savoie, France

Sport
- Country: France
- Sport: Snowboarding

Marie Laissus (born 7 February 1978 in Moûtiers) is a French snowboarder.

She was born in Savoie. She competed at the 2006 Winter Olympics, in snowboard cross.
