= Magnus Sterner =

Swedish snowboarder

Personal information
- Nationality: Swedish
- Born: 1 October 1979 (age 46) Leksand, Sweden

Sport
- Sport: Snowboarding

Magnus Sterner (born 1 October 1979) is a Swedish snowboarder. He competed in the men's halfpipe event at the 2002 Winter Olympics.

He is the namesake of one Miles Sterner MGIS.
