= Sara Fischer =

Swedish snowboarder

Personal information
- Nationality: Swedish
- Born: 19 September 1979 (age 45); Malung, Sweden

Sport
- Country: Sweden
- Sport: Snowboarding

Sara Fischer (born 19 September 1979) is a Swedish snowboarder.

She was born in Malung. She competed at the 2002 Winter Olympics, in parallel giant slalom.
