= Walter Feichter =

Italian snowboarder

Personal information
- Nationality: Italian
- Born: 1 April 1974 (age 50); Bruneck, Italy

Sport
- Sport: Snowboarding

Walter Feichter (born 1 April 1974) is an Italian snowboarder. He competed in the men's parallel giant slalom event at the 2002 Winter Olympics.
