= Ischgl =

Municipality in Tyrol, Austria

- Municipality
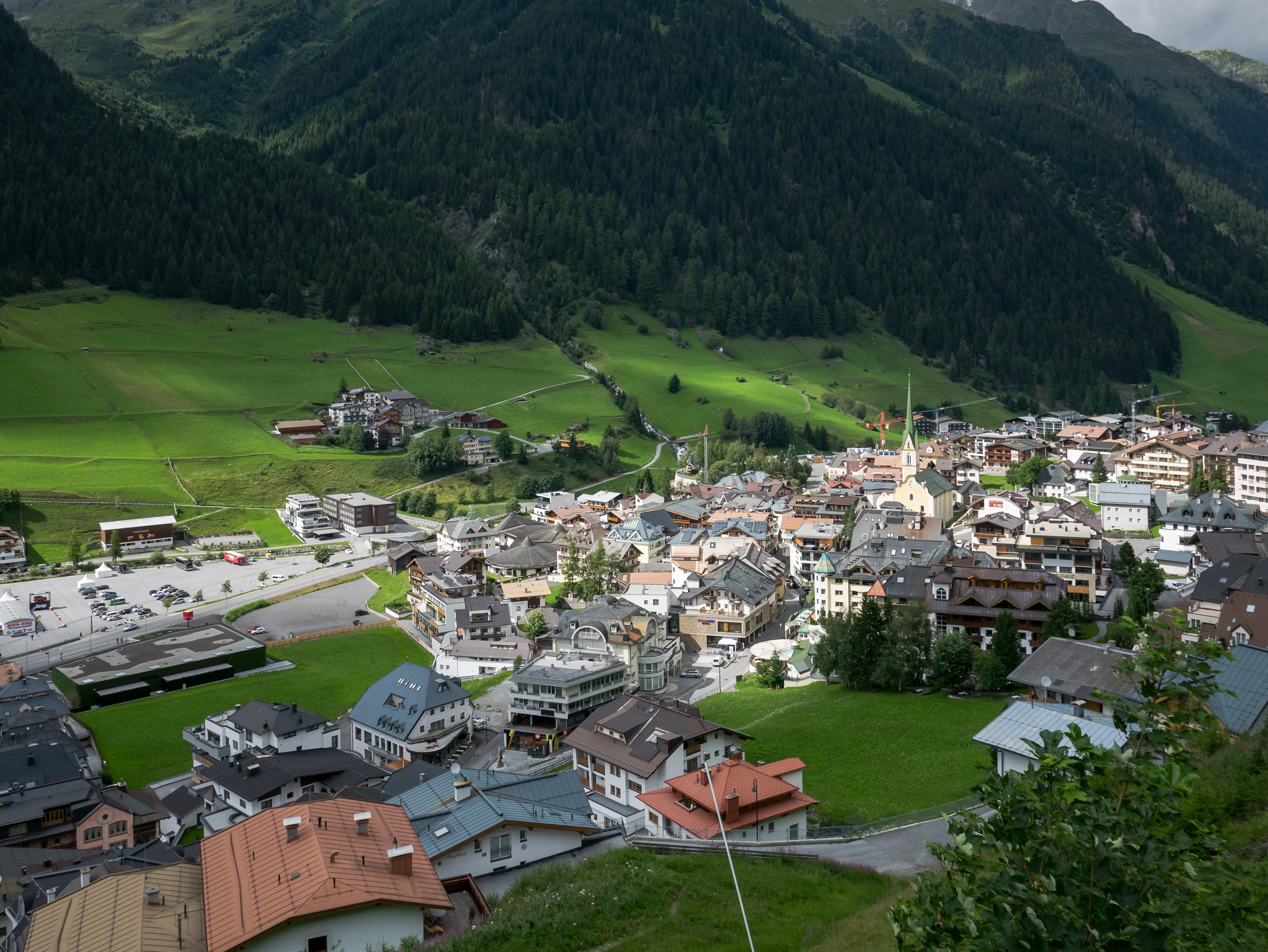

- Coat of arms

- Location within Austria Ischgl (Austria)
- Coordinates: 47°00′47″N 10°17′17″E
- Country: Austria
- State: Tyrol
- District: Landeck

Government
  - Mayor: Werner Kurz

Area
  - Total: 103.34 km^{2} (39.90 sq mi)
- Elevation: 1,377 m (4,518 ft)

Population (2021)
  - Total: 1,564
  - Density: 15.13/km^{2} (39.20/sq mi)
- Time zone: UTC+1 (CET)
  - Summer (DST): UTC+2 (CEST)
- Postal code: 6561
- Area code: 05444
- Vehicle registration: LA
- Website: ischgl.gv.at

Ischgl (German: [ˈɪʃɡl̩]) is a town in the Paznaun valley in the Austrian state of Tyrol. Its ski resort is connected with that of Samnaun across the border in Switzerland to form one of the largest in the Alps. Ischgl was a major hotspot in 2020 of the COVID-19 pandemic in Europe.

== Ski resort ==
Ischgl is located on the Austrian side of one of the world's largest ski areas. Its 238 kilometres (148 mi) (length includes the pistes in Samnaun, Switzerland) of groomed pistes are served by over 45 mechanical lifts including cable cars, gondolas, detachable chair lifts and some T-bars. Three ropeways give access to the ski area from the village: the Pardatschgratbahn, the Fimbabahn & the Silvrettabahn. Only the Fimbabahn and the Silvrettabahn have middle stations.

Many of the lifts converge at Idalp, where there is a restaurant. The area above Idalp offers wide, easy pistes and a snow park. Other parts of the Ischgl area, towards Höllboden and Paznauner Thaya, offer many red runs and some more challenging blacks. The steepest run in the resort is a black run with a gradient of 70%, located in the Höllboden bowl, and accessed by the "Lange Wand" chair lift. Paznauner Thaya offers many red runs suitable for intermediate-level skiers.

== COVID-19 pandemic hotspot ==
Ischgl was identified as a major hotspot of the COVID-19 pandemic in Europe. Six hundred infections in Austria and up to 1,200 infections in Germany and the Nordic countries were traced back to the ski resort, starting from Iceland on 1 March 2020, with transmissions occurring from late February 2020. A significant portion of the cases were further traced to the Kitzloch après-ski bar at the resort, where shared whistles were likely conduits of contagion. Even as health authorities in other countries began issuing warnings against travel to Ischgl, the resort remained open, with Tyrolean authorities playing down the risks. The bar was eventually closed on 10 March and the whole town quarantined from 13 March until 22 April 2020.

Out of the 1600 inhabitants of Ischgl, two persons died. Nine were treated in hospital, one in an intensive care unit. In April 2020 antibodies were found in 51.4% of the population, in November 2020 it was still 45.4%.

== Climate ==
Ischgl has a weather station at an altitude of 2,327 m (7,635 ft). This weather station is located within the alpine climate zone (Köppen ETH), closely bordering on a subarctic climate (Köppen Dfc), because the hottest month is only 9.9 °C (49.8 °F).

== Discovery of the Ischgl Meteorite ==
In June 1976, the Ischgl meteorite was discovered on a mountain road near Ischgl, Austria, after being dislodged by a snow avalanche. Initially unrecognized as a meteorite, it was stored privately for over three decades until its scientific validation in 2008. Classified as an LL6 chondrite with excellent preservation, the meteorite's origin was traced back to a fireball event (EN241170) recorded in November 1970 over Germany. Advanced trajectory reconstruction techniques and radionuclide data confirmed the meteorite's link to this fireball, providing insights into its cosmic history and heliocentric orbit.

Subsequently, the Ischgl meteorite was acquired by the Natural History Museum Vienna in 2011 and displayed in their Meteorite hall. With a remaining main mass of 708.1 grams, the meteorite's exterior is fully crusted, showcasing regmaglypts, while its interior reveals a light-gray chondritic texture. The identification of the meteorite's source fireball helps understand its journey through space and its relatively recent fall to Earth. Additional fragments from this meteorite fall could have been recovered in the area.

Climate data for Ischgl (1991−2020 normals, extremes 1991−2020)
Month	Jan	Feb	Mar	Apr	May	Jun	Jul	Aug	Sep	Oct	Nov	Dec	Year
Record high °C (°F)	8.6 (47.5)	9.1 (48.4)	10.0 (50.0)	12.6 (54.7)	19.0 (66.2)	24.4 (75.9)	22.8 (73.0)	23.0 (73.4)	19.6 (67.3)	17.5 (63.5)	14.2 (57.6)	9.8 (49.6)	24.4 (75.9)
Mean daily maximum °C (°F)	−2.2 (28.0)	−2.6 (27.3)	0.0 (32.0)	3.2 (37.8)	7.2 (45.0)	11.2 (52.2)	13.3 (55.9)	12.3 (54.1)	9.0 (48.2)	6.1 (43.0)	1.4 (34.5)	−1.5 (29.3)	4.8 (40.6)
Daily mean °C (°F)	−5.3 (22.5)	−5.8 (21.6)	−3.4 (25.9)	−0.4 (31.3)	3.8 (38.8)	7.7 (45.9)	9.8 (49.6)	9.9 (49.8)	6.3 (43.3)	3.6 (38.5)	−1.3 (29.7)	−4.5 (23.9)	1.7 (35.1)
Mean daily minimum °C (°F)	−8.0 (17.6)	−9.8 (14.4)	−6.7 (19.9)	−4.0 (24.8)	0.3 (32.5)	3.9 (39.0)	5.9 (42.6)	5.7 (42.3)	2.8 (37.0)	0.4 (32.7)	−4.0 (24.8)	−7.2 (19.0)	−1.7 (28.9)
Record low °C (°F)	−23.5 (−10.3)	−26.6 (−15.9)	−23.2 (−9.8)	−18.7 (−1.7)	−11.6 (11.1)	−7.7 (18.1)	−2.7 (27.1)	−3.9 (25.0)	−6.4 (20.5)	−14.8 (5.4)	−18.3 (−0.9)	−23.0 (−9.4)	−26.6 (−15.9)
Source: Central Institute for Meteorology and Geodynamics

== Gallery ==
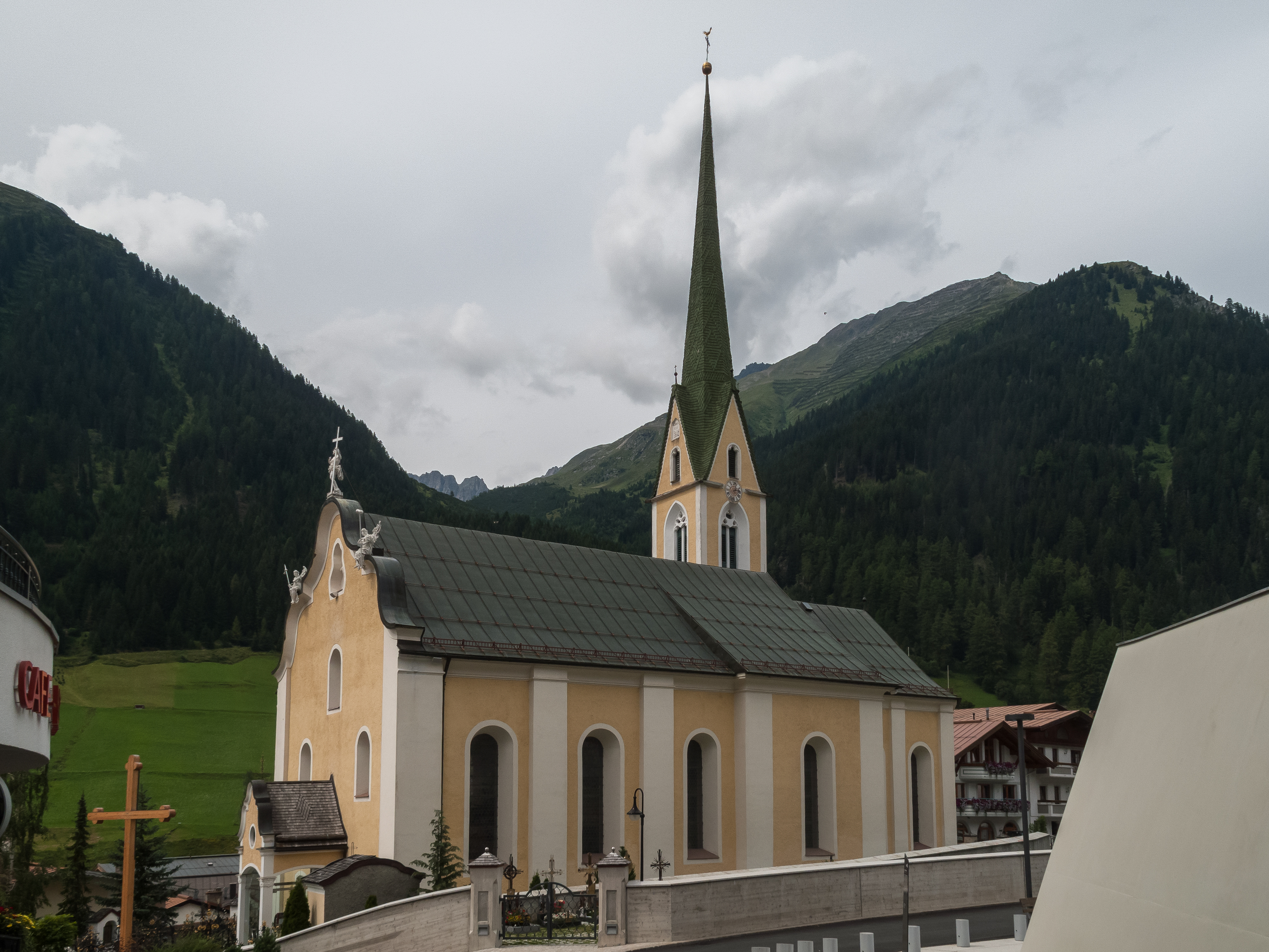
Roman Catholic church St. Nikolaus

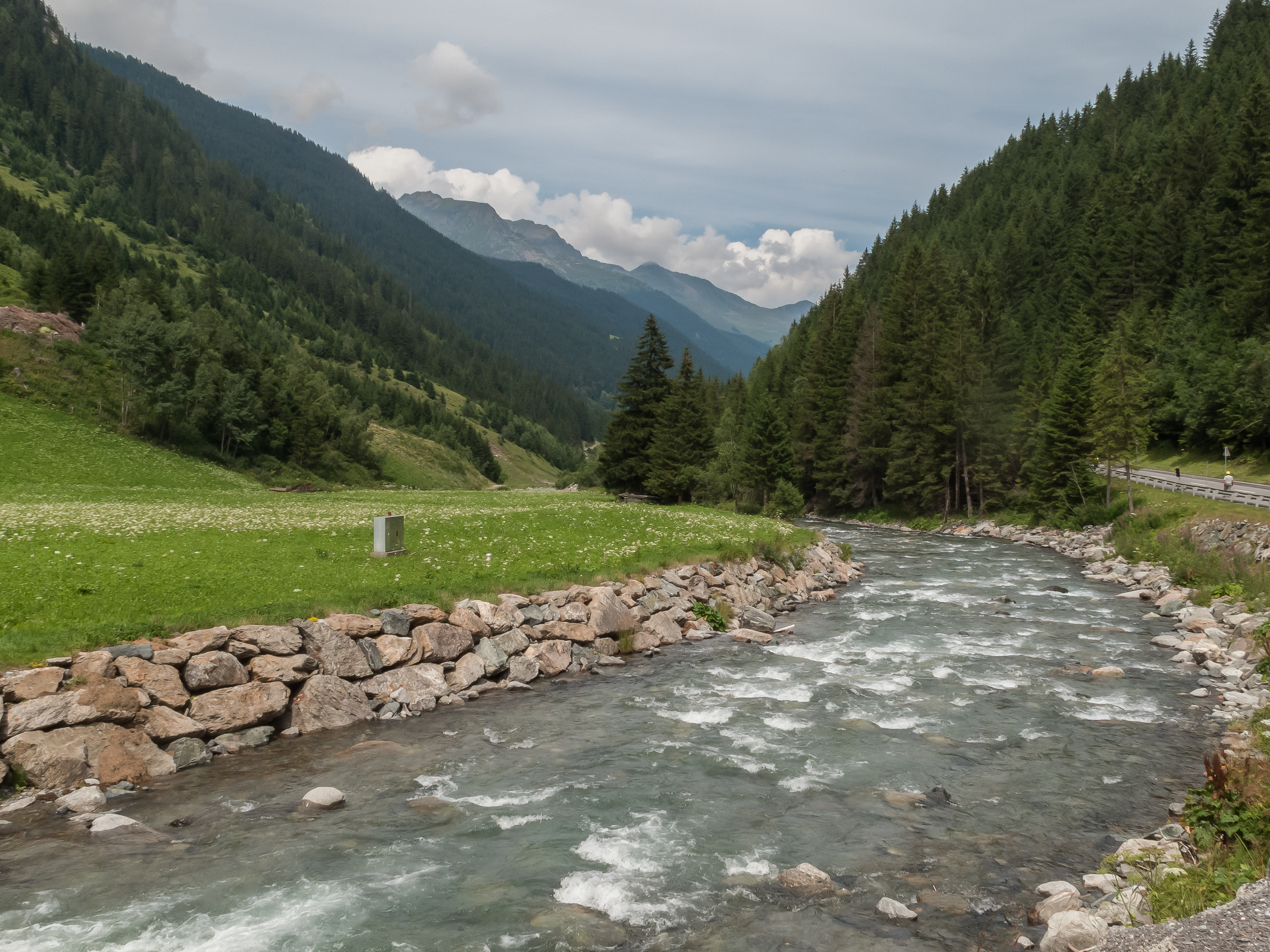
Trisanna river
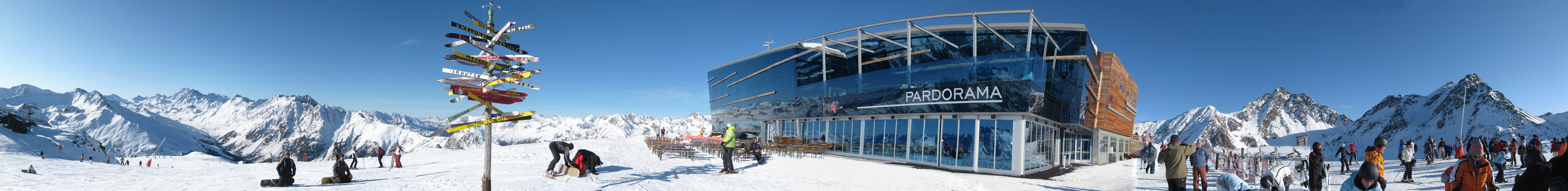
Panorama of Ischgl Pardorama
