= Heikki Sorsa =

Finnish snowboarder

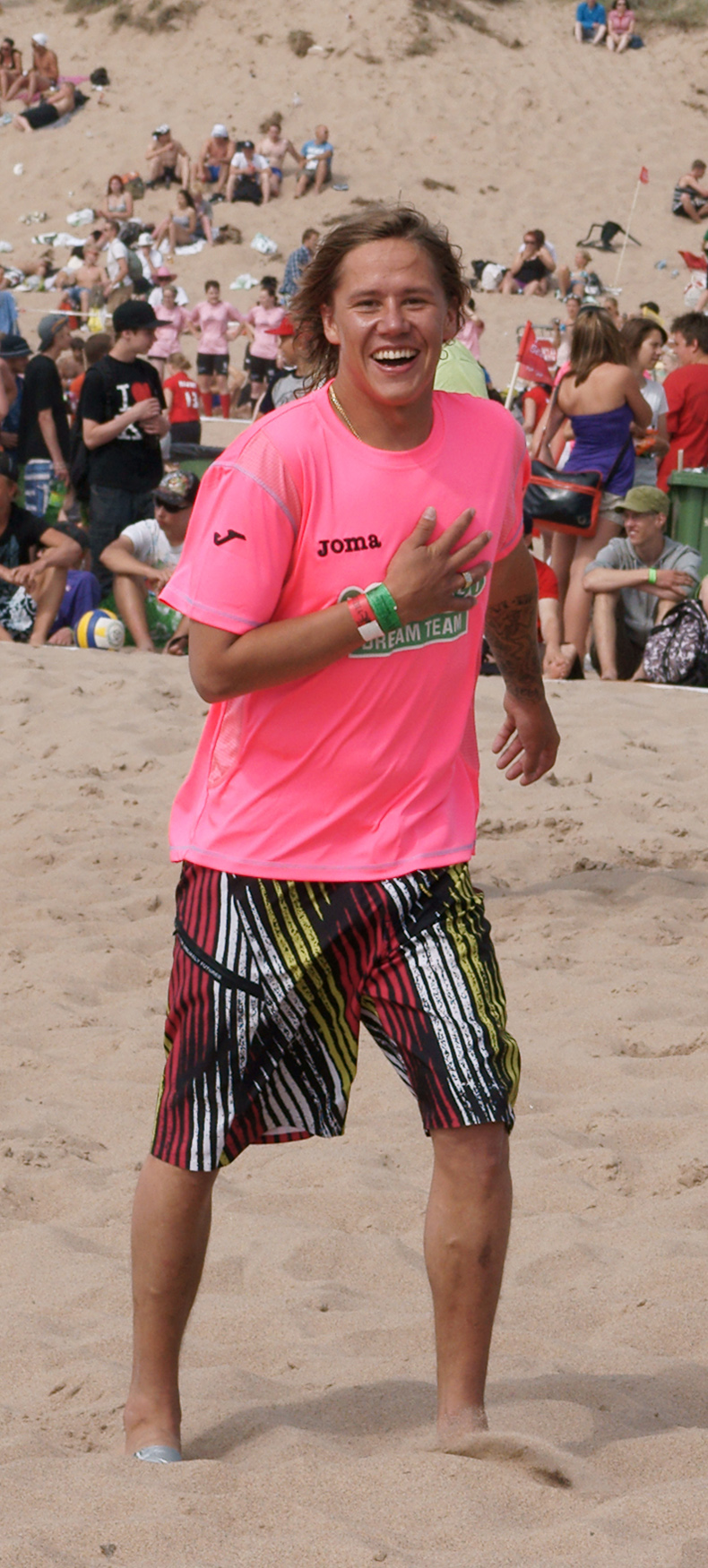
- Heikki Sorsa in 2010

Personal information
- Nationality: Finnish
- Born: 10 February 1982 (age 43); Helsinki, Finland

Sport
- Sport: Snowboarding

Heikki Sorsa (born 10 February 1982) is a Finnish snowboarder. He competed in the men's halfpipe event at the 2002 Winter Olympics. He also held a world record for the highest air in a quarter pipe for six years, with the result of 9.3 metres.

He appeared on the first series of Petolliset, the Finnish edition of The Traitors.
