= Kreischberg =

Coordinates: 47.0664°N 14.0417°E

Kreischberg is an Austrian ski resort in Styria, Austria.

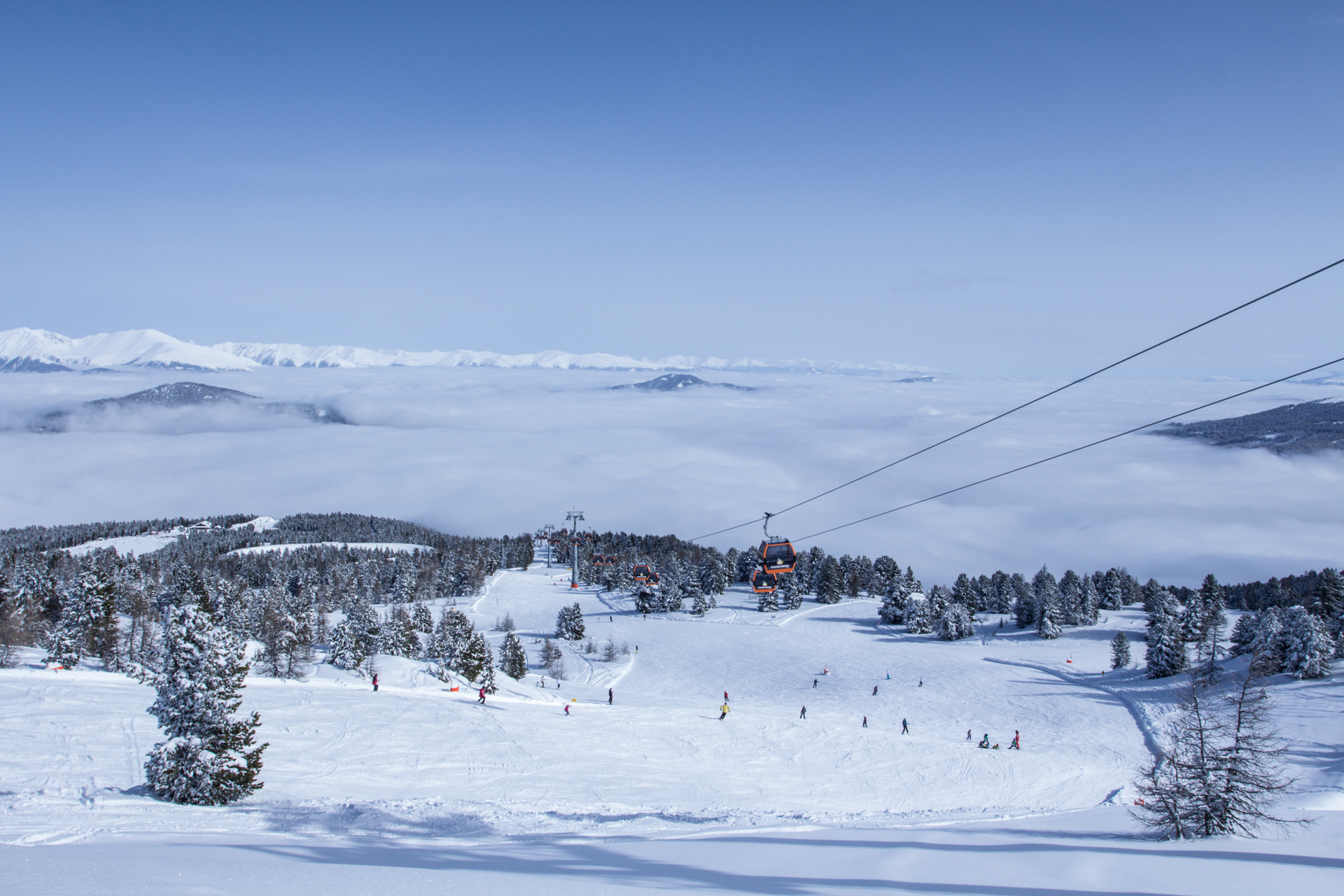
View from the 10-seater gondola at the Niedere Tauern.

The area includes the adjacent Rosenkranzhöhe and offers 40 kilometres of slopes altogether. In December 2013, Kreischberg was considered the first 10-seater gondola in Styria. Recently, the resort has been awarded multiple times for its high-quality slopes.

== Landscape ==
Compared to other ski resorts, Kreischberg is known for having an above-average number of snowboarders. This is due to its extensive and somewhat relatively flat slopes. For this reason, it has been a venue for multiple national and international snowboarding competitions.

== Competitions ==
In addition to the FIS Snowboarding World Championships in 2003, FIS-Telemark-World Cup in 2009, and other international competitions, the FIS Freestyle Ski and Snowboarding World Championships 2015 was held at Kreischberg and Lachtal Ski Area from January 15 to the 25th.

== Management and operation ==
Since August 2014, Karl Fussi and Reinhard Kargl have been in charge of the ski resort as managing directors. Kreischberg owns 88,5 % of the nearby ski resort Lachtal. Due to this close cooperation, a joint ticket is offered for the two ski areas.

== Background ==
The ski resort is named after a flattening north of Rosenkranzhöhe (2118 m.a.A). It is located in the northeastern part of the Gurktal Alps, at 1981 m.a.A. Several logging roads and trails are especially present in the northern part of the mountain (Sankt Georgen ob Murau, Stadl an der Mur).

== International Competitions ==
The Kreischberg ski resort hosted the FIS Freestyle Ski & Snowboard World Cup from January 15 to 25 in 2015. Based on their own measurements, Kreischberg has the largest halfpipe in Europe, and they regularly participate in the Snowboarding World Cup competitions. In 2003, Kreischberg hosted the FIS Snowboard World Cup, and during the 2004/05 season, it was the first ski resort in Austria to host the FIS—Skicross World Cup. In January 2009, the FIS-Telemark was held at Kreischberg.

== Lift operation and other equipment ==
The Kreischberg owns the following chairlifts and gondolas:

- 10-seater gondola
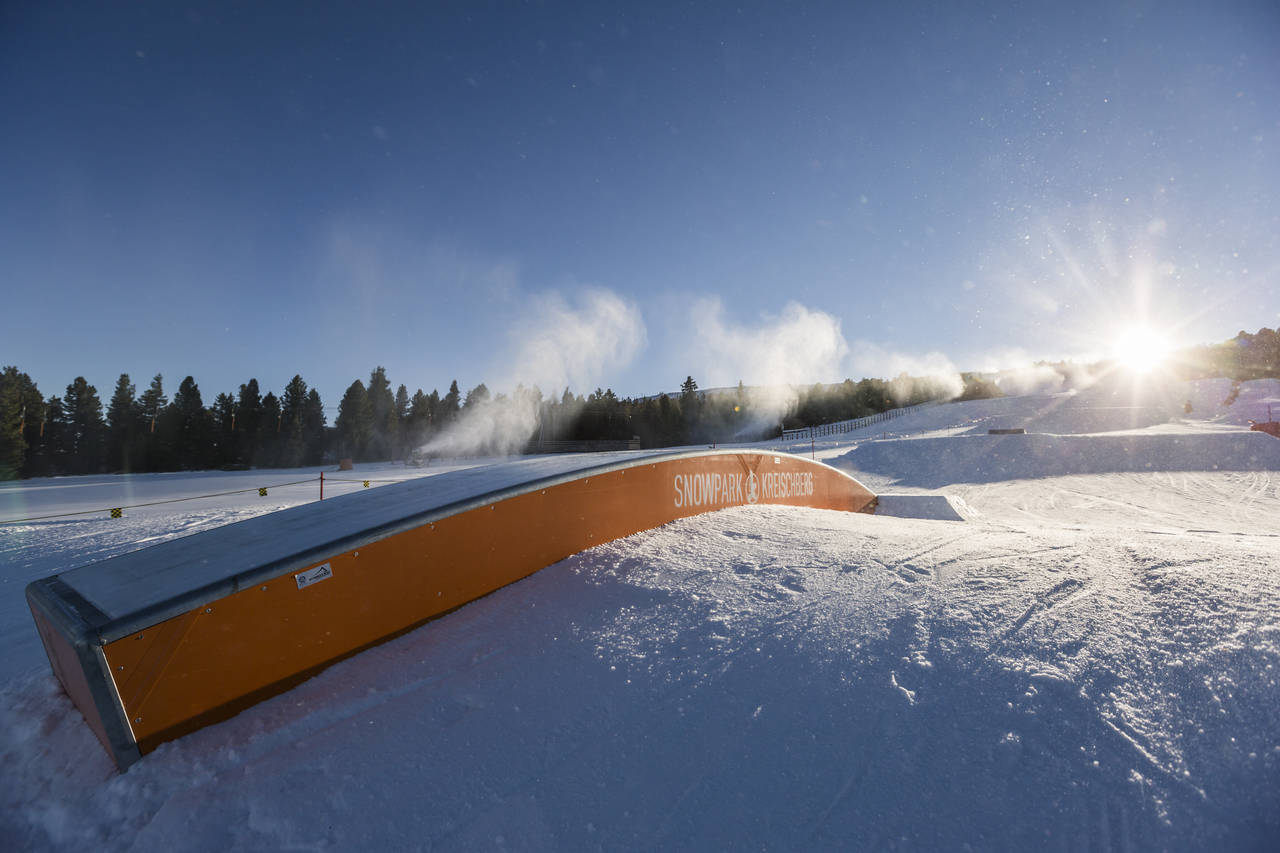
  Snowpark Kreischberg, Beginner Line, Rainbow Butterbox
- 2 gondolas "Gondelbahn 1. und 2. Sektion"
- Six-seater chair lift "Sixpack"
- Four-seater chair lift "Schopfart"
- 2 double-chair lifts "Ochsenberg" and "Rosenkranz"
- 4 tow lifts "Kreischi", "Sunshine I & II" and "Rosenkranz"
- 2 practise lifts
- Tubing lift
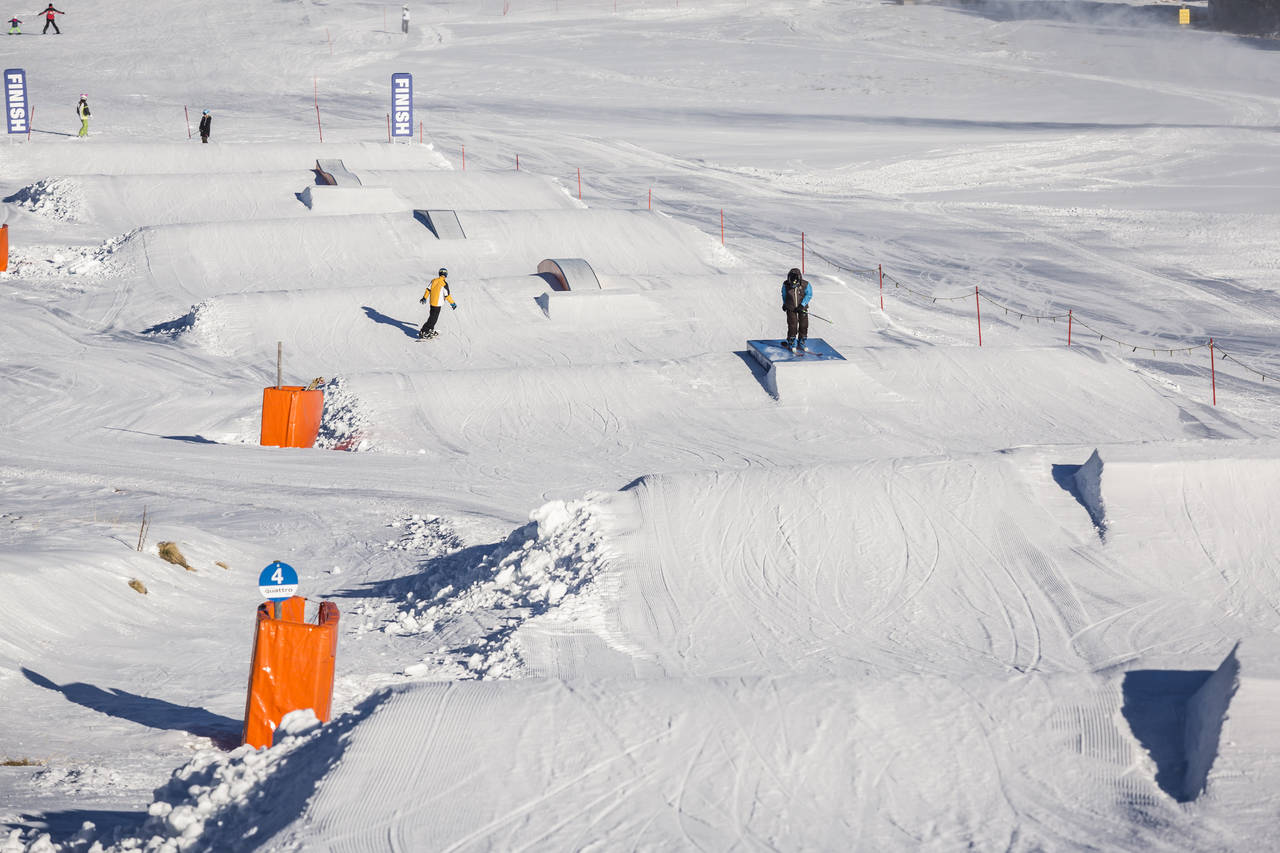
  Snowpark Kreischberg, Beginner Line

The 6-seater chairlift dates back to the 2008-09 season. In the summer of 2012, the " Riegleralm " area was developed, increasing Kreischberg's number of slopes offered to 40 kilometres.

Kreischberg 10er - 2021 Projekt: The gondola lift for up to 6 passengers (built in 1992) will be replaced with a new one for up to 10 passengers. This will be a 40 million Euro investment, including the gondola lift and new buildings for valley, middle, and mountain stations.

In December 2015, a new Freestyle park for snowboarders and freeskiers opened in Kreischberg, at 1,900 m.a.A. It got named “Snowpark Kreischberg” and is being operated by QParks. The park consists of one beginner line with three kickers, one wave run jump, 4 butter boxes (dance floor, rainbow, wave, flat/down), a beginner banked ramp and a medium line. The medium line consists of 11 different elements, including various kickers, tubes, jibs, rails and boxes.
