= Markus Ebner =

German snowboarder (born 1970)

Personal information
- Nationality: German
- Born: 9 November 1970 (age 54); Ingolstadt, Germany

Sport
- Sport: Snowboarding

Markus Ebner (born 9 November 1970) is a German former snowboarder. He competed at the 2002 Winter Olympics and the 2006 Winter Olympics.
