= Isabelle Blanc =

French snowboarder (born 1975)

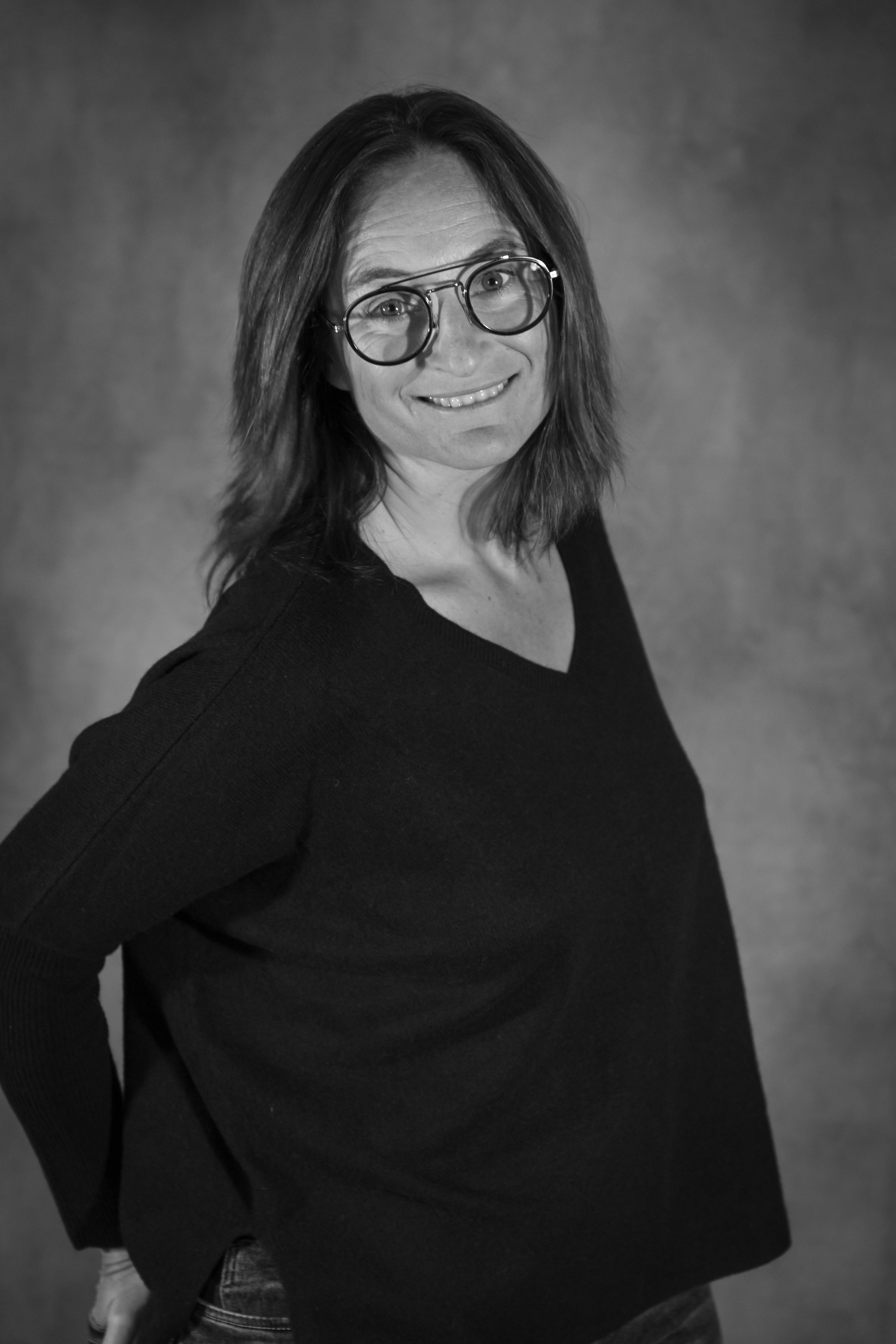

Personal information
- Nationality: French
- Born: 25 July 1975 (age 50) Nîmes

Sport
- Country: France
- Sport: Snowboarding
Medal record
Women's snowboarding
Representing France
Olympic Games
Gold medal – first place	2002 Salt Lake City	Parallel giant slalom
FIS Snowboarding World Championships
Gold medal – first place	1999 Berchtesgaden	Parallel giant slalom
Gold medal – first place	2003 Kreischberg	Parallel slalom
Silver medal – second place	1999 Berchtesgaden	Parallel slalom
Silver medal – second place	2001 Madonna di Campiglio	Giant slalom
Silver medal – second place	2001 Madonna di Campiglio	Parallel slalom

Isabelle Blanc (born 25 July 1975) is a French snowboarder and Olympic champion. She won a gold medal at the 2002 Winter Olympics in Salt Lake City.
