= Valle Nevado =

Ski resort in Chile

Coordinates: 33.356687°S 70.249468°W

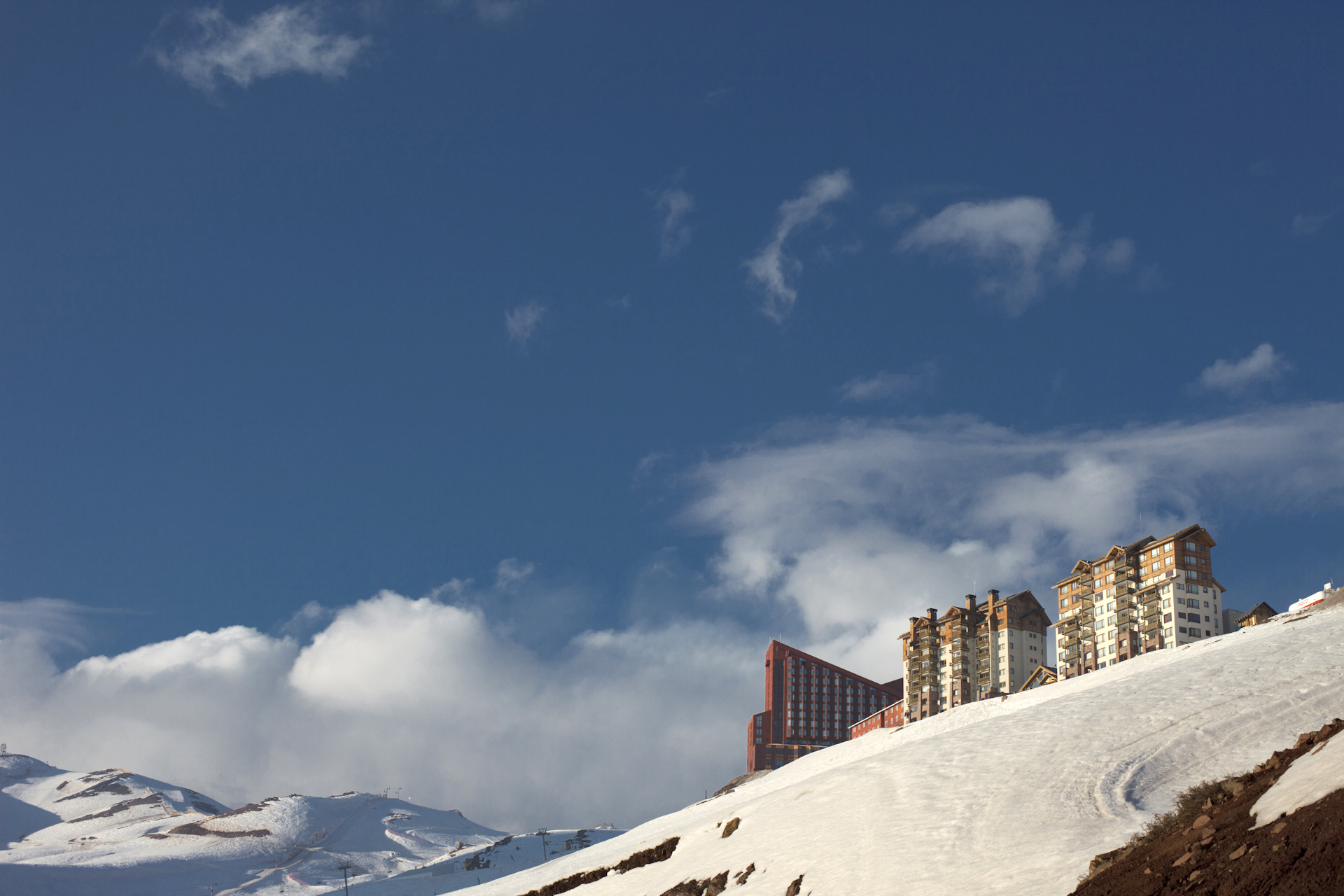
- Interactive map of Valle Nevado
- Location: Andes Mountains, Chile
- Nearest city: Santiago - 46 km (29 mi)
- Top elevation: 5,430 m (17,815 ft) AMSL
- Base elevation: 3,000 m (9,843 ft)
- Skiable area: 900 hectares (2,224 acres)
- Lift system: 1 cable car, 5 chairlifts, 7 surface lifts, 3 magic carpets
- Terrain parks: 1
- Snowmaking: Y
- Website: http://www.vallenevado.com/en/

Valle Nevado ((Spanish pronunciation: ['βaʎe ne'βaðo]) – Snowy Valley in the Spanish language) is a ski resort located on the El Plomo foothills in the Andes Mountains, at 46 kilometres or 29 miles to the east of Santiago, the capital of Chile. Founded in 1988 by French entrepreneurs, it includes housing facilities along with around 900 hectares of skiing area.

== History ==
The construction of the site began in 1987 and was completed the following year. This French-Chilean project was inspired by similar European resorts, especially Les Arcs in France. In 2001 the resort opened the first detachable chairlift in the region, gaining a significant advantage on its competitors.

From 2008 to 2010 important building projects have been realised in order to offer more housing to the tourists. One of the biggest among these projects is the construction of two buildings named Valle de los Condores. The last year also sees the installation of additional chairlifts and a ski lift, and the opening of several new slopes.

Valle Nevado Ski Resort opened the first mountain cable car in Chile in 2013.

== Description ==
The season traditionally starts in June and ends in October. The ski resort has 34 marked slopes, 4 for beginners, 11 for intermediates, 14 for advanced levels and 5 for experts. Access to the slopes is done through 16 mechanical means installed on the mountain. There is also a snow park for practicing more radical maneuvers.

== Services ==
Valle Nevado has a ski and snowboard school, equipment rental service, medical center, mini-market and several stores. There is also a wide variety of restaurants and hotels close to the slopes.

== Geography ==
=== Climate ===
Due to its elevation, Valle Nevado has a subalpine climate (Dfc, according to the Köppen climate classification), with drier summers and humid winters, with an average annual precipitation of 1,042 mm (41 in). Summers are chilly and dry, while winters are cold and extremely snowy: the annual average snowfall is about 7.4 metres or 290 inches.

Climate data for Valle Nevado, Chile; elevation 2,871 metres or 9,419 feet
Month	Jan	Feb	Mar	Apr	May	Jun	Jul	Aug	Sep	Oct	Nov	Dec	Year
Mean daily maximum °C (°F)	15.5 (59.9)	15.5 (59.9)	14.2 (57.6)	10.1 (50.2)	3.9 (39.0)	−0.4 (31.3)	−1.4 (29.5)	0.0 (32.0)	2.1 (35.8)	4.9 (40.8)	8.0 (46.4)	12.3 (54.1)	7.1 (44.7)
Daily mean °C (°F)	11.3 (52.3)	11.3 (52.3)	9.7 (49.5)	5.5 (41.9)	−0.2 (31.6)	−3.4 (25.9)	−4.1 (24.6)	−3.0 (26.6)	−1.8 (28.8)	0.8 (33.4)	3.9 (39.0)	8.0 (46.4)	3.2 (37.7)
Mean daily minimum °C (°F)	7.0 (44.6)	7.3 (45.1)	5.7 (42.3)	1.4 (34.5)	−3.9 (25.0)	−6.6 (20.1)	−7.1 (19.2)	−6.1 (21.0)	−5.5 (22.1)	−3.5 (25.7)	−0.9 (30.4)	3.2 (37.8)	−0.7 (30.6)
Average precipitation mm (inches)	53 (2.1)	49 (1.9)	37 (1.5)	65 (2.6)	114 (4.5)	162 (6.4)	121 (4.8)	114 (4.5)	103 (4.1)	87 (3.4)	76 (3.0)	61 (2.4)	1,042 (41.2)
Average snowfall cm (inches)	0.0 (0.0)	0.0 (0.0)	0.0 (0.0)	30.5 (12.0)	114.3 (45.0)	163.3 (64.3)	141.7 (55.8)	137.2 (54.0)	72.9 (28.7)	61.0 (24.0)	22.9 (9.0)	0.0 (0.0)	743.8 (292.8)
Source 1: Climate-Data.org
Source 2: snow-forecast.com

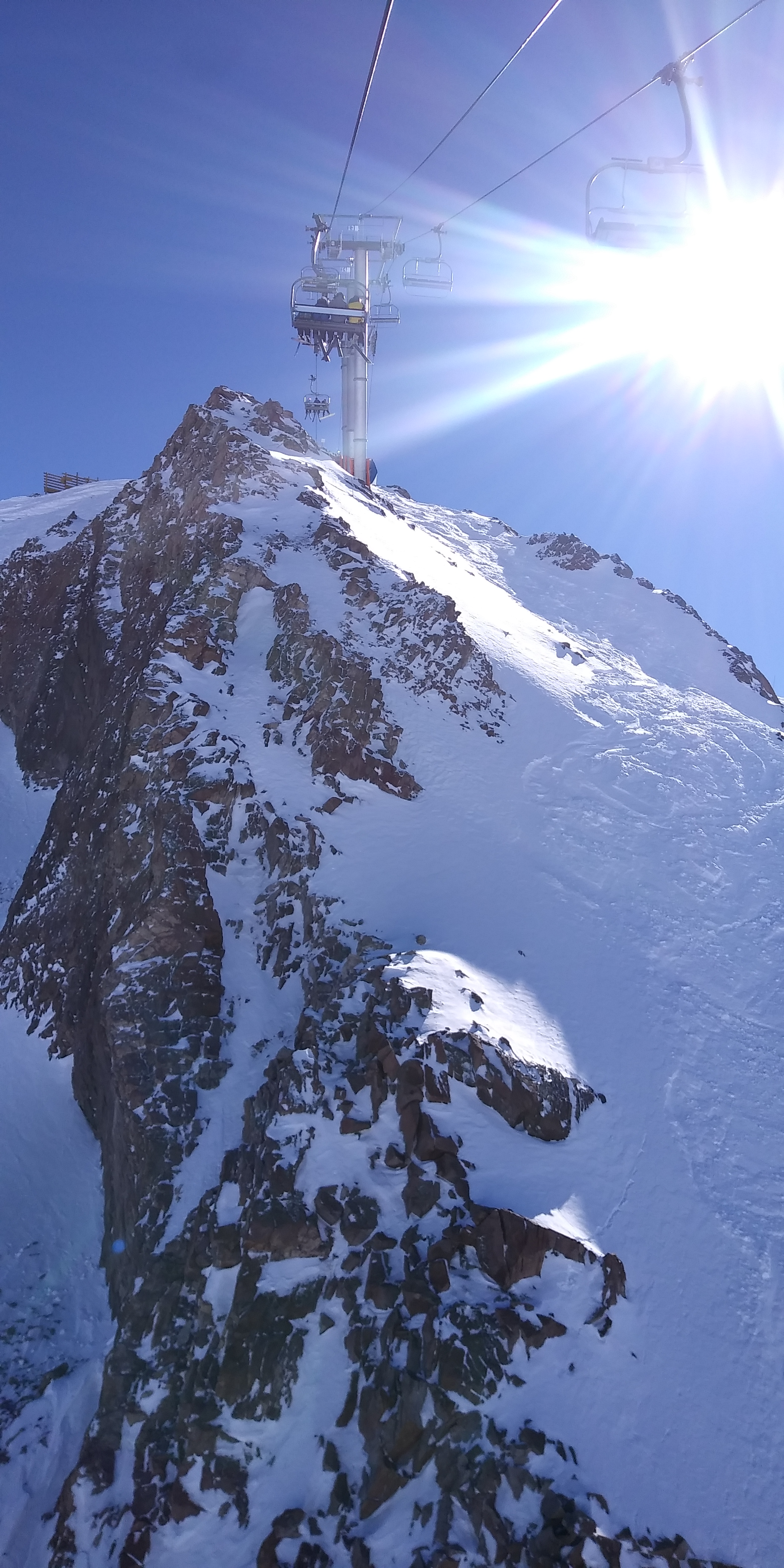
Top of Andes Express detachable chairlift

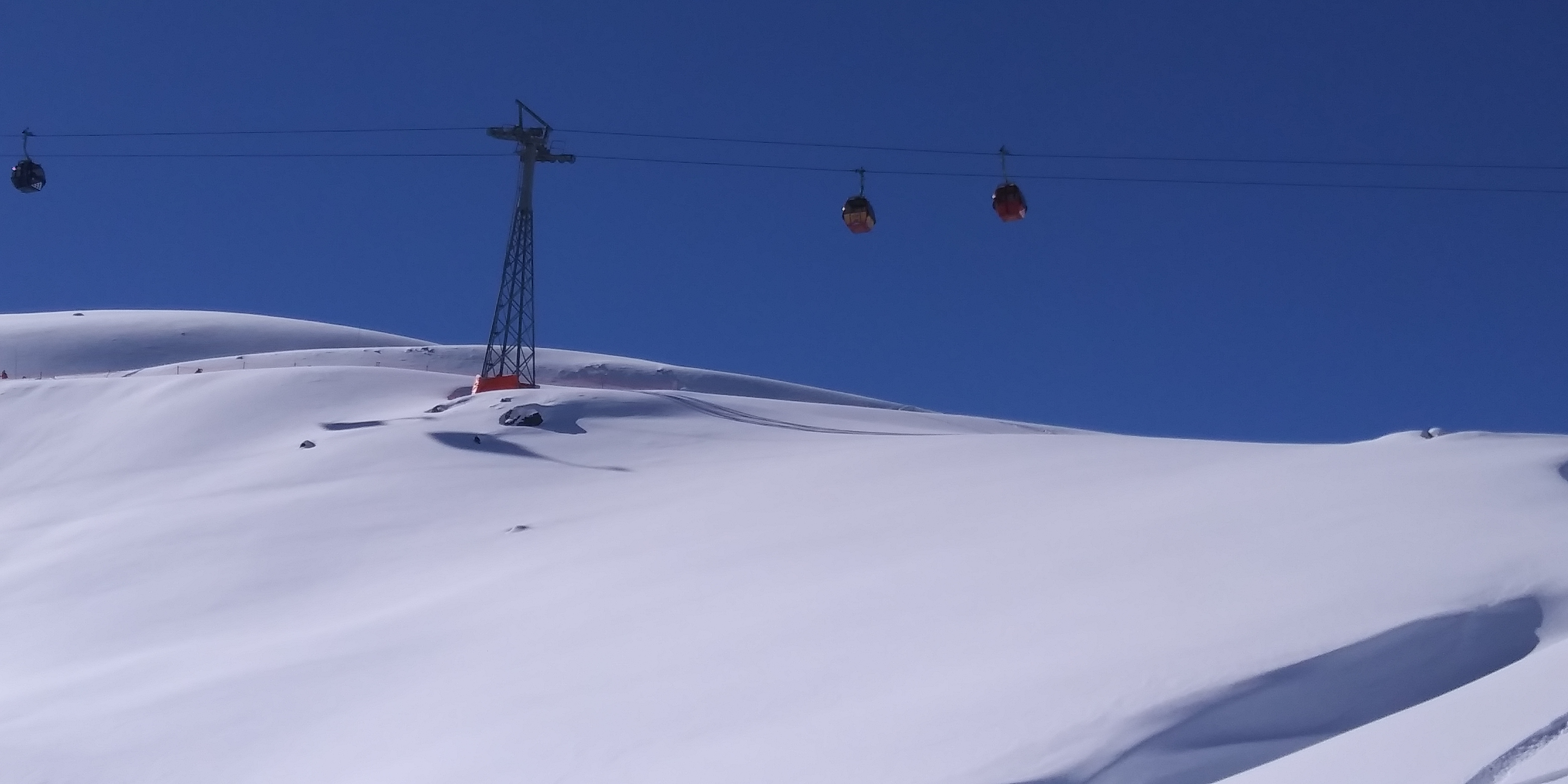
Valle Nevado Gondola

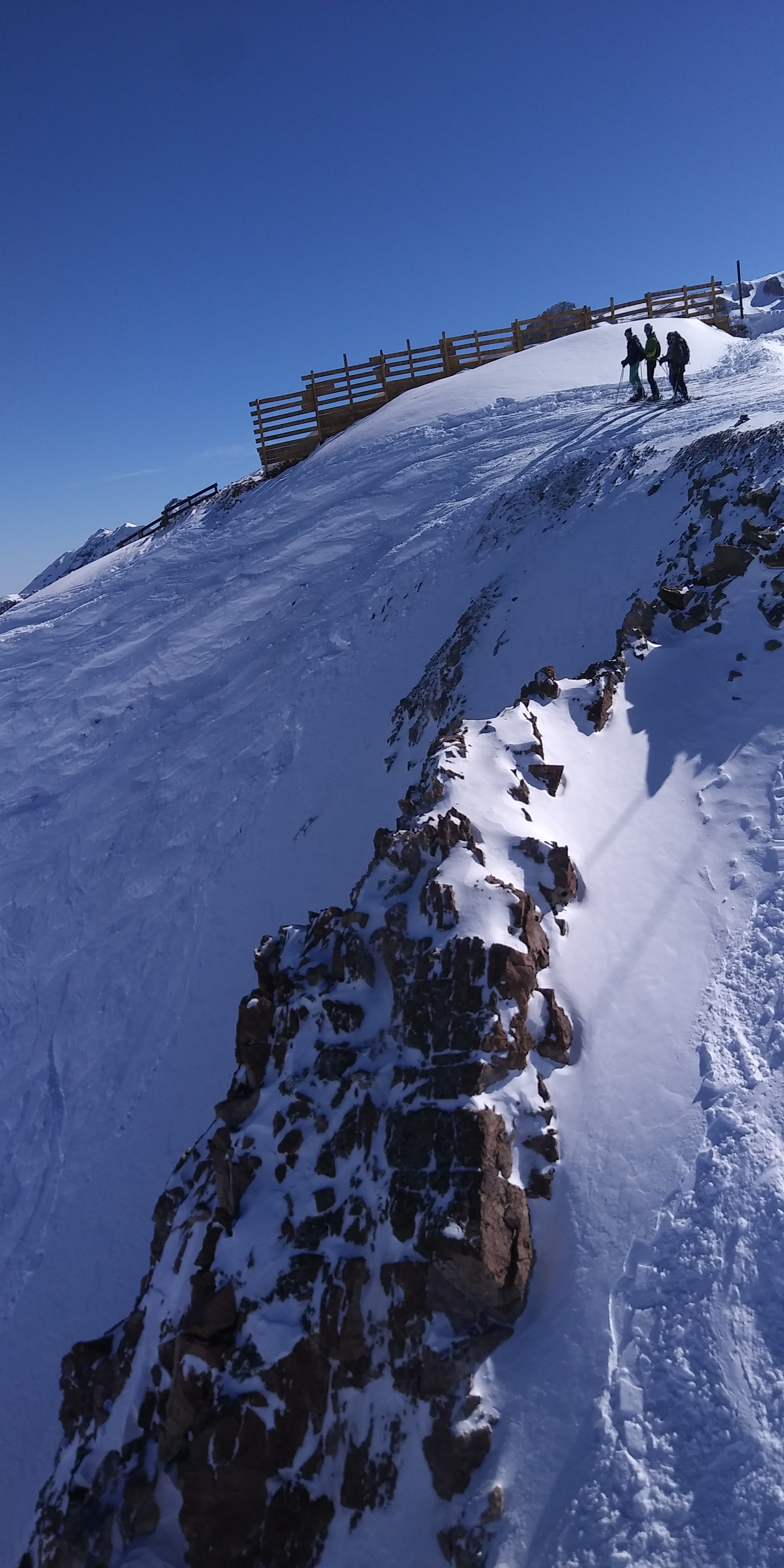
Valle Nevado eclipse run
