= FIS Snowboard World Cup =

Annual snowboarding competition

- Status: active
- Genre: sports event
- Date: Northern wintertime season
- Begins: December
- Ends: March
- Frequency: annual
- Country: varying
- Inaugurated: 1994
- 2025–26 FIS Snowboard World Cup

The FIS Snowboard World Cup is an annual snowboarding competition, arranged by the International Ski Federation (FIS) since 1994. Since its inauguration, different disciplines have been added and removed, along with categories used to group them.

Currently disciplines contested in the World Cup are parallel giant slalom and parallel slalom (grouped into the "parallel" category); the halfpipe, big air, and slopestyle (grouped into the "AFU" category); and the discipline-category of snowboard cross. Most of these disciplines have been contested on and off throughout the years. The only discipline contested in every season of the World Cup is the halfpipe (and from 1996–97 season onward the snowboard cross).

There was an "overall" classification until the 2009–10 season. Since then, the World Cup has been divided into the three categories described above.

== Men's standings ==
=== Existing disciplines and grouped ===
==== Parallel (1994–, discontinuously) ====
Season	Winner	Runner-up	Third
1994–95	(United States) Mike Jacoby	(Germany) Mathias Behounek	(Germany) Rainer Krug
No discipline standings between 1995–96 and 1998–99 seasons
1999–00	(France) Mathieu Bozzetto	(France) Nicolas Huet	(Austria) Felix Stadler
No discipline standings in 2000–01 season
2001–02	(France) Mathieu Bozzetto	(Slovenia) Dejan Košir	(Austria) Felix Stadler (2)
2002–03	(France) Mathieu Bozzetto (3)	(Slovenia) Dejan Košir (2)	(Germany) Markus Ebner
2003–04	(Austria) Siegfried Grabner	(France) Mathieu Bozzetto	(Switzerland) Urs Eiselin
2004–05	(Switzerland) Philipp Schoch	(Switzerland) Urs Eiselin	(Austria) Siegfried Grabner
2005–06	(Switzerland) Simon Schoch	(Switzerland) Philipp Schoch	(Switzerland) Heinz Inniger
2006–07	(Switzerland) Simon Schoch (2)	(Austria) Siegfried Grabner	(Slovenia) Rok Flander
2007–08	(Austria) Benjamin Karl	(France) Mathieu Bozzetto (2)	(Austria) Andreas Prommegger
2008–09	(Austria) Siegfried Grabner (2)	(Austria) Benjamin Karl	(Canada) Jasey-Jay Anderson
2009–10	(Austria) Benjamin Karl	(Austria) Andreas Prommegger	(Canada) Jasey-Jay Anderson (2)
2010–11	(Austria) Benjamin Karl	(Austria) Andreas Prommegger	(Italy) Roland Fischnaller
2011–12	(Austria) Andreas Prommegger	(Italy) Roland Fischnaller	(Austria) Benjamin Karl
2012–13	(Austria) Andreas Prommegger	(Italy) Roland Fischnaller	(Slovenia) Žan Košir
2013–14	(Austria) Lukas Mathies	(France) Sylvain Dufour	(Slovenia) Žan Košir(2)
2014–15	(Slovenia) Žan Košir	(Italy) Roland Fischnaller	(United States) Justin Reiter
2015–16	(Bulgaria) Radoslav Yankov	(Italy) Roland Fischnaller	(Russia) Andrey Sobolev
2016–17	(Austria) Andreas Prommegger (3)	(Bulgaria) Radoslav Yankov	(Austria) Benjamin Karl (2)
2017–18	(Switzerland) Nevin Galmarini	(Italy) Roland Fischnaller (5)	(Italy) Edwin Coratti
2018–19	(Russia) Andrey Sobolev	(Slovenia) Tim Mastnak	(Italy) Roland Fischnaller (2)
2019–20	(Italy) Roland Fischnaller	(Germany) Stefan Baumeister	(Russia) Dmitry Loginov
2020–21	(Italy) Aaron March	(Austria) Andreas Prommegger	(Russia) Dmitry Loginov (2)
2021–22	(South Korea) Lee Sang-ho	(Germany) Stefan Baumeister (2)	(Italy) Edwin Coratti (2)
2022–23	(Austria) Fabian Obmann	(Italy) Maurizio Bormolini	(Austria) Andreas Prommegger (2)
2023–24	(Austria) Benjamin Karl (4)	(Austria) Andreas Prommegger	(Italy) Maurizio Bormolini
2024–25	(Italy) Maurizio Bormolini	(Austria) Andreas Prommegger (5)	(Italy) Daniele Bagozza
2025–26	(Italy) Maurizio Bormolini (2)	(Austria) Benjamin Karl (2)	(Italy) Aaron March

- Medals:

Rank	Nation	Gold	Silver	Bronze	Total
1	Austria	11	8	7	26
2	Italy	4	6	7	17
3	Switzerland	4	2	2	8
4	France	3	4	0	7
5	Slovenia	1	3	3	7
6	Bulgaria	1	1	0	2
7	Russia	1	0	3	4
8	United States	1	0	1	2
9	South Korea	1	0	0	1
10	Germany	0	3	2	5
11	Canada	0	0	2	2
Totals (11 entries)		27	27	27	81

===== Parallel giant slalom (1999–, discontinuously) =====
Season	Winner	Second	Third
1999–00	(France) Mathieu Bozzetto	(France) Nicolas Huet	(Austria) Felix Stadler
No discipline standings in 2000–01 season
2001–02	(Slovenia) Dejan Košir	(France) Mathieu Bozzetto	(Austria) Siegfried Grabner
No discipline standings between 2002–03 and 2011–12 seasons
2012–13	(Austria) Andreas Prommegger	(Italy) Roland Fischnaller	(Slovenia) Rok Marguč
2013–14	(Austria) Lukas Mathies	(France) Sylvain Dufour	(Slovenia) Žan Košir
2014–15	(Slovenia) Žan Košir	(Russia) Vic Wild	(Russia) Andrey Sobolev
2015–16	(Russia) Andrey Sobolev	(Bulgaria) Radoslav Yankov	(Austria) Andreas Prommegger
2016–17	(Bulgaria) Radoslav Yankov	(Austria) Andreas Prommegger	(Austria) Benjamin Karl
2017–18	(Switzerland) Nevin Galmarini	(Italy) Edwin Coratti	(Austria) Benjamin Karl
2018–19	(Slovenia) Tim Mastnak	(Austria) Andreas Prommegger	(Italy) Roland Fischnaller
2019–20	(Italy) Roland Fischnaller	(Austria) Benjamin Karl	(Russia) Dmitry Loginov
2020–21	(Italy) Roland Fischnaller	(Russia) Igor Sluev	(Austria) Benjamin Karl (3)
2021–22	(Germany) Stefan Baumeister	(South Korea) Lee Sang-ho	(Slovenia) Tim Mastnak
2022–23	(Italy) Roland Fischnaller (3)	(Austria) Andreas Prommegger	(Poland) Oskar Kwiatkowski
2023–24	(Austria) Benjamin Karl	(Austria) Andreas Prommegger	(Italy) Roland Fischnaller (2)
2024–25	(Italy) Maurizio Bormolini	(Austria) Andreas Prommegger (5)	(Bulgaria) Radoslav Yankov
2025–26	(Italy) Maurizio Bormolini (2)	(Austria) Benjamin Karl (2)	(Italy) Aaron March

- Medals:

Rank	Nation	Gold	Silver	Bronze	Total
1	Italy	5	2	3	10
2	Austria	3	7	6	16
3	Slovenia	3	0	3	6
4	France	1	3	0	4
5	Russia	1	2	2	5
6	Bulgaria	1	1	1	3
7	Germany	1	0	0	1
7	Switzerland	1	0	0	1
9	South Korea	0	1	0	1
10	Poland	0	0	1	1
Totals (10 entries)		16	16	16	48

===== Parallel slalom (2000–, discontinuously) =====
Season	Winner	Second	Third
2000–01	(France) Mathieu Bozzetto	(France) Nicolas Huet	(Sweden) Richard Rikardsson
2001–02	(France) Mathieu Bozzetto(2)	(France) Nicolas Huet (2)	(Slovenia) Dejan Košir
No discipline standings between 2002–03 and 2011–12 seasons
2012–13	(Italy) Roland Fischnaller	(Slovenia) Žan Košir	(Italy) Aaron March
2013–14	(France) Sylvain Dufour	(Switzerland) Simon Schoch	(Austria) Lukas Mathies
2014–15	(Slovenia) Žan Košir	(Italy) Roland Fischnaller	(Austria) Benjamin Karl
2015–16	(Italy) Roland Fischnaller	(Italy) Mirko Felicetti	(Bulgaria) Radoslav Yankov
2016–17	(Italy) Aaron March	(Germany) Stefan Baumeister	(Italy) Christoph Mick
2017–18	(Italy) Roland Fischnaller (3)	(Russia) Dmitry Loginov	(Austria) Sebastian Kislinger
2018–19	(Germany) Stefan Baumeister	(Russia) Andrey Sobolev	(Switzerland) Dario Caviezel
2019–20	(Austria) Andreas Prommegger	(Italy) Roland Fischnaller (2)	(Germany) Stefan Baumeister
2020–21	(Italy) Aaron March(2)	(Russia) Dmitry Loginov (2)	(Russia) Dmitry Karlagachev
2021–22	(Austria) Andreas Prommegger (2)	(South Korea) Lee Sang-ho	(Austria) Arvid Auner
2022–23	(Austria) Fabian Obmann	(Italy) Maurizio Bormolini	(Austria) Arvid Auner (2)
2023–24	(South Korea) Lee Sang-ho	(Italy) Daniele Bagozza	(Italy) Maurizio Bormolini
2024–25	(Austria) Arvid Auner	(Italy) Gabriel Messner	(Italy) Daniele Bagozza
2025–26	(Italy) Maurizio Bormolini	(Italy) Gabriel Messner (2)	(Italy) Aaron March (2)

- Medals:

Rank	Nation	Gold	Silver	Bronze	Total
1	Italy	6	7	5	18
2	Austria	4	0	5	9
3	France	3	2	0	5
4	Germany	1	1	1	3
4	Slovenia	1	1	1	3
6	South Korea	1	1	0	2
7	Russia	0	3	1	4
8	Switzerland	0	1	1	2
9	Bulgaria	0	0	1	1
9	Sweden	0	0	1	1
Totals (10 entries)		16	16	16	48

==== AFU (2010–) Freestyle overall (HP/BA/SS) ====
Season	Winner	Second	Third
2010–11	(Australia) Nathan Johnstone	(Austria) Clemens Schattschneider	(Japan) Ryo Aono
2011–12	(Finland) Janne Korpi	(Netherlands) Dimi de Jong	(Finland) Petja Piiroinen
2012–13	(Finland) Janne Korpi	(United States) Scott Lago	(China) Yiwei Zhang
2013–14	(Sweden) Måns Hedberg	(Finland) Petja Piiroinen	(Australia) Scotty James
2014–15	(Finland) Janne Korpi (3)	(Finland) Petja Piiroinen (2)	(United States) Taylor Gold (China) Yiwei Zhang (2)
2015–16	(Japan) Ryo Aono	(United States) Chris Corning	(Canada) Max Parrot
2016–17	(Canada) Mark McMorris	(Canada) Max Parrot	(Belgium) Seppe Smits
2017–18	(United States) Chris Corning	(Japan) Yūto Totsuka	(Japan) Ayumu Hirano
2018–19	(United States) Chris Corning (2)	(Japan) Takeru Otsuka	(Japan) Yūto Totsuka
2019–20	(Australia) Scotty James	(Japan) Yūto Totsuka	(United States) Chris Corning
2020–21	(Norway) Marcus Kleveland	(Japan) Yūto Totsuka (3)	(Canada) Liam Brearley
2021–22	(Norway) Mons Røisland	(New Zealand) Tiarn Collins	(Japan) Ayumu Hirano (2)
2022–23	(Australia) Valentino Guseli	(United States) Dusty Henricksen	(Japan) Taiga Hasegawa
2023–24	(Australia) Valentino Guseli (2)	(Japan) Ryoma Kimata	(Japan) Ruka Hirano
2024–25	(Japan) Taiga Hasegawa	(Japan) Ruka Hirano	(Japan) Yūto Totsuka (2)
2025–26	(Japan) Yūto Totsuka	(Australia) Valentino Guseli	(China) Su Yiming

- Medals:

Rank	Nation	Gold	Silver	Bronze	Total
1	Australia	4	1	1	6
2	Japan	3	6	7	16
3	Finland	3	2	1	6
4	United States	2	3	2	7
5	Norway	2	0	0	2
6	Canada	1	1	2	4
7	Sweden	1	0	0	1
8	Austria	0	1	0	1
8	Netherlands	0	1	0	1
8	New Zealand	0	1	0	1
11	China	0	0	3	3
12	Belgium	0	0	1	1
Totals (12 entries)		16	16	17	49

===== Halfpipe (1994–) =====
Season	Winner	Runner-up	Third
1994–95	(United States) Lael Gregory	(United States) Ross Powers	(Switzerland) Ivan Zeller
1995–96	(United States) Ross Powers	(United States) Rob Kingwill	(United States) Dan Smith
1996–97	(Sweden) Jonas Gunnarsson	(United States) Dan Smith	(Canada) Trevor Andrew
1997–98	(Sweden) Fredrik Sterner	(Norway) Klas Vangen	(Norway) Kim Christiansen
1998–99	(United States) Ross Powers (2)	(United States) Tommy Czeschin	(Sweden) Magnus Sterner
1999–00	(Sweden) Thomas Johansson	(Sweden) Magnus Sterner	(Sweden) Fredrik Sterner
2000–01	(Sweden) Magnus Sterner	(Sweden) Stefan Karlsson	(Germany) Jan Michaelis
2001–02	(Germany) Jan Michaelis	(Finland) Risto Mattila	(Finland) Antti Autti
2002–03	(Germany) Xaver Hoffmann	(Sweden) Magnus Sterner (2)	(Japan) Domu Narita
2003–04	(Finland) Risto Mattila	(Finland) Antti Autti	(Germany) Xaver Hoffmann
2004–05	(France) Mathieu Crepel	(Germany) Jan Michaelis	(Japan) Kazuhiro Kokubo
2005–06	(Germany) Jan Michaelis (2)	(Germany) Xaver Hoffmann	(Japan) Kazuhiro Kokubo (2)
2006–07	(Japan) Ryo Aono	(Japan) Kohei Kudo	(Netherlands) Dolf van der Wal
2007–08	(Switzerland) Iouri Podladtchikov	(United States) Greg Bretz	(Canada) Jeff Batchelor
2008–09	(Japan) Ryo Aono	(Australia) Nathan Johnstone	(France) Gary Zebrowski
2009–10	(Canada) Justin Lamoureux	(Finland) Janne Korpi	(Germany) Christophe Schmidt
2010–11	(Australia) Nathan Johnstone	(Japan) Ryo Aono	(France) Arthur Longo
2011–12	(Finland) Janne Korpi	(Australia) Nathan Johnstone (2)	(Netherlands) Dimi de Jong
2012–13	(United States) Scott Lago	(China) Yiwei Zhang	(Japan) Shuhei Sato
2013–14	(Australia) Scotty James	(France) Johann Baisamy	(Japan) Ryo Aono
2014–15	(United States) Taylor Gold (China) Yiwei Zhang		(United States) Greg Bretz
2015–16	(Japan) Ryo Aono (3)	(Japan) Raibu Katayama	(United States) Chase Josey
2016–17	(Australia) Scotty James	(United States) Chase Josey	(United States) Shaun White
2017–18	(Japan) Yūto Totsuka	(Japan) Ayumu Hirano	(Japan) Raibu Katayama
2018–19	(Japan) Yūto Totsuka	(Japan) Ruka Hirano	(Switzerland) Jan Scherrer
2019–20	(Australia) Scotty James (3)	(Japan) Yūto Totsuka	(Japan) Ruka Hirano
2020–21	(Japan) Yūto Totsuka	(Germany) André Höflich	(Japan) Raibu Katayama (2)
2021–22	(Japan) Ayumu Hirano	(Japan) Ruka Hirano (2)	(Switzerland) Jan Scherrer (2)
2022–23	(Japan) Ruka Hirano	(Australia) Valentino Guseli	(Australia) Scotty James
2023–24	(Japan) Ruka Hirano	(Australia) Valentino Guseli	(Australia) Scotty James (2)
2024–25	(Japan) Ruka Hirano (3)	(Japan) Yūto Totsuka (2)	(Japan) Ayumu Hirano
2025–26	(Japan) Yūto Totsuka (4)	(Australia) Valentino Guseli (3)	(Japan) Ryusei Yamada

- Medals:

Rank	Nation	Gold	Silver	Bronze	Total
1	Japan	11	8	10	29
2	United States	5	6	4	15
3	Australia	4	5	2	11
4	Sweden	4	3	2	9
5	Germany	3	3	3	9
6	Finland	2	3	1	6
7	France	1	1	2	4
8	China	1	1	0	2
9	Switzerland	1	0	3	4
10	Canada	1	0	2	3
11	Norway	0	1	1	2
12	Netherlands	0	0	2	2
Totals (12 entries)		33	31	32	96

===== Big air (2001–, discontinuously) =====
Season	Winner	Runner-up	Third
2001–02	(Sweden) Andreas Jakobsson (Sweden) Björn Lindgren		(Finland) Sami Tuoriniemi
2002–03	(Finland) Jukka Erätuli	(Finland) Sami Tuoriniemi	(Austria) Florian Mausser
2003–04	(Sweden) Simon Ax	(Canada) Neil Connolly	(Austria) Florian Mausser (2)
2004–05	(Finland) Jukka Erätuli (2)	(Slovenia) Matevz Petek	(Finland) Jaakko Ruha
2005–06	(Austria) Stefan Gimpl	(Finland) Ville Uotila	(Slovenia) Matevz Petek
2006–07	(Finland) Peetu Piiroinen	(Slovenia) Matevz Petek (2)	(Finland) Jaakko Ruha (2)
2007–08	(Austria) Stefan Gimpl	(Finland) Janne Korpi	(Slovenia) Matevz Petek (2)
2008–09	(Austria) Stefan Gimpl	(Slovenia) Marko Grilc	(Finland) Peetu Piiroinen
2009–10	(Austria) Stefan Gimpl (4)	(Switzerland) Gian-Luca Cavigelli	(Slovenia) Matevz Pristavec
2010–11	(Austria) Clemens Schattschneider	(Canada) Sebastien Toutant	(Austria) Stefan Falkeis
2011–12	(Finland) Janne Korpi	(Finland) Petja Piiroinen	(Sweden) Niklas Mattsson
2012–13	(Belgium) Seppe Smits	(Austria) Clemens Schattschneider	(Switzerland) Patrick Burgener
No discipline standings in 2013–14 season
2014–15	(Belgium) Seppe Smits (2) (Canada) Darcy Sharpe		(Switzerland) Jonas Boesiger
2015–16	(Canada) Maxence Parrot	(Canada) Tyler Nicholson	(Belgium) Seppe Smits
2016–17	(Canada) Mark McMorris	(Canada) Maxence Parrot	(Belgium) Seppe Smits (2)
2017–18	(United States) Chris Corning	(Japan) Yūri Ōkubo	(Switzerland) Jonas Bösiger
2018–19	(Japan) Takeru Otsuka	(United States) Chris Corning	(Finland) Kalle Järvilehto
2019–20	(United States) Chris Corning (2)	(Canada) Nicolas Laframboise	(Japan) Ryoma Kimata
2020–21	(Canada) Maxence Parrot (2)	(Sweden) Sven Thorgren	(Norway) Mons Røisland
2021–22	(Switzerland) Jonas Bösiger	(China) Su Yiming	(Finland) Rene Rinnekangas
2022–23	(Australia) Valentino Guseli	(United States) Chris Corning (2)	(Norway) Marcus Kleveland
2023–24	(Japan) Kira Kimura	(China) Su Yiming (2)	(Japan) Taiga Hasegawa
2024–25	(Japan) Taiga Hasegawa	(Italy) Ian Matteoli	(China) Yang Wenlong
2025–26	(China) Su Yiming	(Japan) Kira Kimura	(Japan) Yuto Miyamura

- Medals:

Rank	Nation	Gold	Silver	Bronze	Total
1	Austria	5	1	3	9
2	Canada	4	5	0	9
3	Finland	4	4	6	14
4	Japan	3	2	3	8
5	Sweden	3	1	1	5
6	United States	2	2	0	4
7	Belgium	2	0	2	4
8	China	1	2	1	4
9	Switzerland	1	1	3	5
10	Australia	1	0	0	1
11	Slovenia	0	3	3	6
12	Italy	0	1	0	1
13	Norway	0	0	2	2
Totals (13 entries)		26	22	24	72

===== Slopestyle (2011–) =====
Season	Winner	Second	Third
2011–12	(Netherlands) Dimi de Jong	(Canada) Jonathan Versteeg	(Canada) Maxence Parrot
2012–13	(Japan) Yuki Kadono	(Sweden) Sven Thorgren	(Norway) Torstein Horgmo
2013–14	(Sweden) Mans Hedberg	(Canada) Maxence Parrot	(Finland) Petja Piiroinen
2014–15	(Finland) Janne Korpi	(Finland) Petja Piiroinen	(Canada) Michael Ciccarelli
2015–16	(United States) Chris Corning	(United States) Brandon Davis	(Canada) Max Eberhardt
2016–17	(United States) Redmond Gerard	(United Kingdom) Jamie Nicholls	(Canada) Mark McMorris
2017–18	(United States) Chris Corning	(United States) Redmond Gerard	(Norway) Marcus Kleveland
2018–19	(United States) Chris Corning (3)	(United States) Judd Henkes	(United States) Lyon Farrell
2019–20	(Japan) Ruki Tobita	(Australia) Tiarn Collins	(United States) Dusty Henricksen
2020–21	(Norway) Marcus Kleveland	(Canada) Liam Brearley	(Germany) Leon Vockensperger
2021–22	(New Zealand) Tiarn Collins	(Germany) Leon Vockensperger	(Norway) Mons Røisland
2022–23	(United States) Dusty Henricksen	(Japan) Taiga Hasegawa	(Australia) Valentino Guseli
2023–24	(Canada) Liam Brearley	(Japan) Ryoma Kimata	(Japan) Taiga Hasegawa
2024–25	(Canada) Cameron Spalding	(United States) Redmond Gerard (2)	(China) Su Yiming
2025–26	(China) Su Yiming	(United States) Judd Henkes (2)	(Japan) Yuto Kimura

- Medals:

Rank	Nation	Gold	Silver	Bronze	Total
1	United States	5	5	2	12
2	Canada	2	3	4	9
3	Japan	2	2	2	6
4	Finland	1	1	1	3
5	Sweden	1	1	0	2
6	Norway	1	0	3	4
7	China	1	0	1	2
8	Netherlands	1	0	0	1
8	New Zealand	1	0	0	1
10	Australia	0	1	1	2
10	Germany	0	1	1	2
12	Great Britain	0	1	0	1
Totals (12 entries)		15	15	15	45

==== Snowboard cross (1996–) ====
Season	Winner	Runner-up	Third
1996–97	(Italy) Elmar Messner	(Italy) Alex Voyat	(Sweden) Richard Rikardsson
1997–98	(Austria) Alexander Koller	(Sweden) Daniel Biveson	(Canada) Drew Neilson
1998–99	(France) Sylvain Duclos	(Sweden) Magnus Sterner	(Canada) Ben Wainwright
1999–00	(Sweden) Pontus Stahlkloo	(Switzerland) Guillaume Nantermod	(Australia) Zeke Steggall
2000–01	(Sweden) Pontus Stahlkloo (2)	(Canada) Jasey-Jay Anderson	(Austria) Alexander Maier
2001–02	(Canada) Jasey-Jay Anderson	(Canada) Drew Neilson	(France) Aymerick Mermoz
2002–03	(France) Xavier de Le Rue	(Canada) Jasey-Jay Anderson	(France) Mickael David
2003–04	(France) Xavier de Le Rue	(Italy) Simone Malusa	(Canada) Drew Neilson (2)
2004–05	(France) Xavier de Le Rue (3)	(Canada) Jasey-Jay Anderson (3)	(United States) Nate Holland
2005–06	(Canada) Jasey-Jay Anderson (2)	(Canada) Drew Neilson	(France) Xavier de Le Rue
2006–07	(Canada) Drew Neilson	(United States) Nate Holland	(France) Pierre Vaultier
2007–08	(France) Pierre Vaultier	(Norway) Stian Sivertzen	(Austria) Mario Fuchs
2008–09	(Austria) Markus Schairer	(United States) Seth Wescott	(United States) Nick Baumgartner
2009–10	(France) Pierre Vaultier	(Australia) Alex Pullin	(United States) Graham Watanabe
2010–11	(Australia) Alex Pullin	(France) Pierre Vaultier	(United States) Jonathan Cheever
2011–12	(France) Pierre Vaultier	(Russia) Andrey Boldykov	(United States) Nate Holland (2)
2012–13	(Australia) Alex Pullin (2)	(Austria) Markus Schairer	(Italy) Omar Visintin
2013–14	(Italy) Omar Visintin	(Germany) Paul Berg	(Canada) Christopher Robanske
2014–15	(Spain) Lucas Eguibar	(Australia) Alex Pullin (2)	(Russia) Nikolay Olyunin
2015–16	(France) Pierre Vaultier	(Austria) Alessandro Hämmerle	(Spain) Lucas Eguibar
2016–17	(France) Pierre Vaultier	(Italy) Omar Visintin	(Austria) Alessandro Hämmerle
2017–18	(France) Pierre Vaultier (6)	(Austria) Alessandro Hämmerle	(Australia) Alex Pullin
2018–19	(Austria) Alessandro Hämmerle	(Italy) Omar Visintin (2)	(Germany) Martin Noerl
2019–20	(Austria) Alessandro Hämmerle	(Italy) Lorenzo Sommariva	(Italy) Omar Visintin (2)
2020–21	(Austria) Alessandro Hämmerle (3)	(Canada) Éliot Grondin	(France) Merlin Surget
2021–22	(Germany) Martin Nörl	(Austria) Alessandro Hämmerle	(Austria) Jakob Dusek
2022–23	(Germany) Martin Nörl (2)	(Spain) Lucas Eguibar	(Canada) Éliot Grondin
2023–24	(Canada) Éliot Grondin	(Austria) Alessandro Hämmerle (4)	(Australia) Cameron Bolton
2024–25	(Canada) Éliot Grondin (2)	(France) Loan Bozzolo	(Austria) Jakob Dusek (2)
2025–26	(Germany) Leon Ulbricht	(Australia) Adam Lambert	(France) Aidan Chollet

- Medals:

Rank	Nation	Gold	Silver	Bronze	Total
1	France	10	2	6	18
2	Canada	5	6	5	16
3	Austria	5	5	5	15
4	Germany	3	1	1	5
5	Italy	2	5	2	9
6	Australia	2	3	3	8
7	Sweden	2	2	1	5
8	Spain	1	1	1	3
9	United States	0	2	5	7
10	Russia	0	1	1	2
11	Norway	0	1	0	1
11	Switzerland	0	1	0	1
Totals (12 entries)		30	30	30	90

=== Extinct disciplines ===
==== Overall (1994–2010) ====
Season	Winner	Second	Third
1994–95	(United States) Mike Jacoby	(Netherlands) Thedo Remmelink	(United States) Steve Persons
1995–96	(United States) Mike Jacoby(2)	(Austria) Stefan Wurzacher	(Netherlands) Thedo Remmelink
1996–97	(Austria) Harald Walder	(Austria) Peter Pechhacker	(United States) Anton Pogue
1997–98	(Austria) Alexander Koller	(Sweden) Richard Rikardsson	(Germany) Dieter Moherndl
1998–99	(France) Mathieu Bozzetto	(Austria) Stefan Kaltschütz	(United States) Ross Powers
1999–00	(France) Mathieu Bozzetto (2)	(France) Nicolas Huet	(Austria) Felix Stadler
2000–01	(Canada) Jasey-Jay Anderson	(Italy) Walter Feichter	(France) Nicolas Huet
2001–02	(Canada) Jasey-Jay Anderson	(France) Mathieu Bozzetto	(France) Nicolas Huet(2)
2002–03	(Canada) Jasey-Jay Anderson	(Germany) Markus Ebner	(Austria) Lukas Grüner
2003–04	(Canada) Jasey-Jay Anderson(4)	(Austria) Dieter Krassnig	(Canada) Drew Neilson
2005–06	(Switzerland) Simon Schoch	(Austria) Siegfried Grabner	(Slovenia) Rok Flander
2006–07	(Switzerland) Simon Schoch(2)	(Austria) Siegfried Grabner(2)	(Finland) Peetu Piiroinen
2007–08	(Austria) Benjamin Karl	(France) Mathieu Bozzetto(2)	(France) Pierre Vaultier
2008–09	(Austria) Siegfried Grabner	(Austria) Markus Schairer	(Austria) Benjamin Karl
2009–10	(Austria) Benjamin Karl(2)	(France) Pierre Vaultier	(Austria) Andreas Prommegger
No overall standings from this season.

==== Giant slalom (1994–2002) ====
Season	Winner	Second	Third
1994–95	(United States) Mike Jacoby	(Austria) Peter Pechhacker	(Netherlands) Thedo Remmelink
1995–96	(United States) Mike Jacoby(2)	(Austria) Peter Pechhacker	(Austria) Harald Walder
1996–97	(Austria) Peter Pechhacker	(Austria) Harald Walder	(Canada) Ross Rebagliati
1997–98	(France) Nicolas Conte	(Austria) Peter Pechhacker(3)	(Austria) Harald Walder(2)
1998–99	(Austria) Stefan Kaltschütz	(United States) Jeff Archibald	(France) Mathieu Bozzetto
1999–00	(Austria) Stefan Kaltschütz(2)	(France) Mathieu Bozzetto	(France) Nicolas Huet
2000–01	(Italy) Walter Feichter	(Austria) Stefan Kaltschütz	(Canada) Jasey-Jay Anderson
2001–02	(Slovenia) Dejan Košir	(Germany) Marcus Ebner	(Sweden) Stephen Copp
No discipline standings from this season

==== Slalom (1994–1999) ====
Season	Winner	Second	Third
1994–95	(Italy) Peter Pichler	(Netherlands) Thedo Remmelink	(Germany) Rainer Krug
1995–96	(Italy) Peter Pichler(2)	(Austria) Stefan Wurzacher	(France) Maxence Idesheim
1996–97	(Italy) Karl Frenademez	(Austria) Harald Walder	(United States) Anton Pogue
1997–98	(Sweden) Richard Rikardsson	(Slovenia) Dejan Košir	(Germany) Dieter Moherndl
1998–99	(France) Mathieu Bozzetto	(France) Mathieu Chiquet	(France) Nicolas Huet
No discipline standings from this season

== Women's standings ==
=== Existing disciplines and grouped ===
==== Parallel (1994–, discontinuously) ====
Season	Winner	Runner-up	Third
1994–95	(Italy) Marion Posch	(Germany) Heidi Renoth	(Netherlands) Marcella Boerma
No discipline standings between 1995–96 and 1998–99 seasons
1999–00	(France) Isabelle Blanc	(Austria) Manuela Riegler	(France) Karine Ruby
No discipline standings in 2000–01 season
2001–02	(Switzerland) Ursula Bruhin	(Netherlands) Nicolien Sauerbreij	(France) Isabelle Blanc
2002–03	(Switzerland) Ursula Bruhin (2)	(Netherlands) Nicolien Sauerbreij (2)	(Germany) Heidi Renoth
2003–04	(Switzerland) Daniela Meuli	(Switzerland) Ursula Bruhin	(France) Julie Pomagalski
2004–05	(Switzerland) Daniela Meuli	(Switzerland) Ursula Bruhin (2)	(Austria) Doris Günther
2005–06	(Switzerland) Daniela Meuli (3)	(France) Julie Pomagalski	(Switzerland) Ursula Bruhin
2006–07	(Austria) Doresia Krings	(Austria) Heidi Neururer	(Switzerland) Fränzi Mägert-Kohli
2007–08	(Netherlands) Nicolien Sauerbreij	(Austria) Heidi Neururer (2)	(Austria) Claudia Riegler
2008–09	(Germany) Amelie Kober	(Austria) Doris Günther	(Japan) Tomoka Takeuchi
2009–10	(Netherlands) Nicolien Sauerbreij (2)	(Austria) Doris Günther (2)	(Switzerland) Fränzi Mägert-Kohli (2)
2010–11	(Russia) Yekaterina Tudegesheva	(Switzerland) Fränzi Mägert-Kohli	(Austria) Marion Kreiner
2011–12	(Switzerland) Patrizia Kummer	(Germany) Amelie Kober	(Austria) Julia Dujmovits
2012–13	(Switzerland) Patrizia Kummer	(Austria) Marion Kreiner	(Canada) Caroline Calve
2013–14	(Switzerland) Patrizia Kummer (3)	(Czech Republic) Ester Ledecká	(Austria) Julia Dujmovits (2)
2014–15	(Switzerland) Julie Zogg	(Austria) Marion Kreiner (2)	(Czech Republic) Ester Ledecká
2015–16	(Czech Republic) Ester Ledecká	(Russia) Yekaterina Tudegesheva	(Switzerland) Patrizia Kummer
2016–17	(Czech Republic) Ester Ledecká	(Russia) Alena Zavarzina	(Switzerland) Patrizia Kummer (2)
2017–18	(Czech Republic) Ester Ledecká	(Germany) Selina Jörg	(Germany) Ramona Theresia Hofmeister
2018–19	(Czech Republic) Ester Ledecká (4)	(Germany) Selina Jörg (2)	(Austria) Sabine Schöffmann
2019–20	(Germany) Ramona Theresia Hofmeister	(Switzerland) Julie Zogg	(Germany) Selina Jörg
2020–21	(Germany) Ramona Theresia Hofmeister	(Russia) Sofia Nadyrshina	(Switzerland) Julie Zogg
2021–22	(Germany) Ramona Theresia Hofmeister	(Switzerland) Julie Zogg (2)	(Austria) Daniela Ulbing
2022–23	(Switzerland) Julie Zogg (2)	(Germany) Ramona Theresia Hofmeister	(Austria) Sabine Schöffmann
2023–24	(Germany) Ramona Theresia Hofmeister (4)	(Japan) Tsubaki Miki	(Austria) Sabine Schöffmann
2024–25	(Japan) Tsubaki Miki	(Germany) Ramona Theresia Hofmeister (2)	(Austria) Sabine Schöffmann (4)
2025–26	(Japan) Tsubaki Miki (2)	(Italy) Lucia Dalmasso	(Italy) Elisa Caffont

- Medals:

Rank	Nation	Gold	Silver	Bronze	Total
1	Switzerland	10	5	6	21
2	Germany	5	6	3	14
3	Czech Republic	4	1	1	6
4	Netherlands	2	2	1	5
5	Japan	2	1	1	4
6	Austria	1	7	10	18
7	Russia	1	3	0	4
8	France	1	1	3	5
9	Italy	1	1	1	3
10	Canada	0	0	1	1
Totals (10 entries)		27	27	27	81

===== Parallel giant slalom (1995–, discontinuously) =====
Season	Winner	Second	Third
1999–00	(France) Isabelle Blanc	(Austria) Manuela Riegler	(France) Karine Ruby
2001–02	(France) Isabelle Blanc (2)	(Austria) Doris Günther	(France) Karine Ruby (2)
No discipline standings between 2002–03 and 2011–12 seasons
2012–13	(Austria) Marion Kreiner	(Switzerland) Patrizia Kummer	(Japan) Tomoka Takeuchi
2013–14	(Switzerland) Patrizia Kummer	(Japan) Tomoka Takeuchi	(Czech Republic) Ester Ledecká
2014–15	(Austria) Marion Kreiner (2)	(Czech Republic) Ester Ledecká	(Switzerland) Julie Zogg
2015–16	(Czech Republic) Ester Ledecká	(Russia) Yekaterina Tudegesheva	(Austria) Marion Kreiner
2016–17	(Russia) Alena Zavarzina	(Switzerland) Patrizia Kummer (2)	(Czech Republic) Ester Ledecká (2)
2017–18	(Czech Republic) Ester Ledecká	(Germany) Selina Jörg	(Austria) Julia Dujmovits
2018–19	(Czech Republic) Ester Ledecká (3)	(Germany) Selina Jörg	(Germany) Ramona Theresia Hofmeister
2019–20	(Germany) Ramona Theresia Hofmeister	(Germany) Selina Jörg (3)	(Switzerland) Ladina Jenny
2020–21	(Germany) Ramona Theresia Hofmeister	(Russia) Sofia Nadyrshina	(Germany) Selina Jörg
2021–22	(Germany) Ramona Theresia Hofmeister	(Russia) Sofia Nadyrshina (2)	(Austria) Daniela Ulbing
2022–23	(Germany) Ramona Theresia Hofmeister	(Austria) Sabine Schöffmann	(Switzerland) Ladina Jenny (2)
2023–24	(Germany) Ramona Theresia Hofmeister (5)	(Japan) Tsubaki Miki	(Italy) Lucia Dalmasso
2024–25	(Japan) Tsubaki Miki	(Germany) Ramona Theresia Hofmeister	(Austria) Sabine Schöffmann
2025–26	(Japan) Tsubaki Miki (2)	(Italy) Lucia Dalmasso	(Italy) Elisa Caffont

- Medals:

Rank	Nation	Gold	Silver	Bronze	Total
1	Germany	5	4	2	11
2	Czech Republic	3	1	2	6
3	Austria	2	3	4	9
4	Japan	2	2	1	5
5	France	2	0	2	4
6	Russia	1	3	0	4
7	Switzerland	1	2	3	6
8	Italy	0	1	2	3
Totals (8 entries)		16	16	16	48

===== Parallel slalom (1994–, discontinuously) =====
Season	Winner	Second	Third
1994–95	(Italy) Marion Posch	(Germany) Heidi Renoth	(Netherlands) Marcella Boerma
2000–01	(Italy) Carmen Ranigler	(France) Karine Ruby	(United States) Rosey Fletcher
2001–02	(France) Karine Ruby	(Germany) Heidi Renoth (2)	(France) Isabelle Blanc
No discipline standings between 2002–03 and 2011–12 seasons
2012–13	(Switzerland) Patrizia Kummer	(Germany) Amelie Kober	(Canada) Caroline Calve
2013–14	(Switzerland) Patrizia Kummer	(Czech Republic) Ester Ledecká	(Russia) Yekaterina Tudegesheva
2014–15	(Switzerland) Julie Zogg	(Austria) Sabine Schöffmann	(Norway) Hilde Katrine Engeli
2015–16	(Switzerland) Patrizia Kummer (3)	(Russia) Yekaterina Tudegesheva	(Austria) Ina Meschik
2016–17	(Austria) Daniela Ulbing	(Czech Republic) Ester Ledecká (2)	(Austria) Sabine Schöffmann
2017–18	(Russia) Ekaterina Tudegesheva	(Germany) Selina Jörg	(Austria) Julie Zogg
2018–19	(Switzerland) Julie Zogg	(Germany) Selina Jörg (2)	(Switzerland) Patrizia Kummer
2019–20	(Switzerland) Julie Zogg	(Germany) Ramona Theresia Hofmeister	(Germany) Selina Jörg
2020–21	(Switzerland) Julie Zogg	(Russia) Sofia Nadyrshina	(Germany) Selina Jörg (2)
2021–22	(Switzerland) Julie Zogg	(Japan) Tsubaki Miki	(Germany) Ramona Theresia Hofmeister
2022–23	(Switzerland) Julie Zogg (6)	(Austria) Daniela Ulbing	(Austria) Sabine Schöffmann (2)
2023–24	(Germany) Ramona Theresia Hofmeister	(Austria) Sabine Schöffmann	(Czech Republic) Ester Ledecká
2024–25	(Japan) Tsubaki Miki	(Austria) Sabine Schöffmann (3)	(Germany) Ramona Theresia Hofmeister (2)
2025–26	(Italy) Lucia Dalmasso	(Japan) Tsubaki Miki (2)	(Czech Republic) Zuzana Maderova

- Medals:

Rank	Nation	Gold	Silver	Bronze	Total
1	Switzerland	9	0	1	10
2	Italy	3	0	0	3
3	Germany	1	6	4	11
4	Austria	1	4	4	9
5	Russia	1	2	1	4
6	Japan	1	2	0	3
7	France	1	1	1	3
8	Czech Republic	0	2	2	4
9	Canada	0	0	1	1
9	Netherlands	0	0	1	1
9	Norway	0	0	1	1
9	United States	0	0	1	1
Totals (12 entries)		17	17	17	51

==== AFU (2010–) Freestyle overall (HP/BA/SS) ====
Season	Winner	Runner-up	Third
2010–11	(China) Cai Xuetong	(Australia) Holly Crawford	(China) Sun Zhifeng
2011–12	(China) Cai Xuetong	(Spain) Queralt Castellet	(France) Emma Bernard
2012–13	(United States) Kelly Clark	(United States) Liu Jiayu	(France) Sophie Rodriguez
2013–14	(Czech Republic) Šárka Pančochová	(United States) Kelly Clark	(Netherlands) Cheryl Maas
2014–15	(Netherlands) Cheryl Maas	(Slovakia) Klaudia Medlová	(United States) Kelly Clark
2015–16	(United States) Jamie Anderson	(China) Cai Xuetong	(United Kingdom) Katie Ormerod
2016–17	(Austria) Anna Gasser	(United States) Jamie Anderson	(United States) Julia Marino
2017–18	(Japan) Miyabi Onitsuka	(United States) Chloe Kim	(China) Liu Jiayu
2018–19	(Japan) Miyabi Onitsuka (2)	(Japan) Reira Iwabuchi	(China) Cai Xuetong
2019–20	(China) Cai Xuetong (3)	(United Kingdom) Katie Ormerod	(Japan) Reira Iwabuchi
2020–21	(Austria) Anna Gasser (2)	(Japan) Kokomo Murase	(United States) Chloe Kim
2021–22	(Japan) Kokomo Murase	(Austria) Anna Gasser	(Canada) Jasmine Baird
2022–23	(Japan) Mitsuki Ono	(United States) Julia Marino	(Japan) Reira Iwabuchi
2023–24	(Japan) Kokomo Murase (2)	(Japan) Mitsuki Ono	(Japan) Reira Iwabuchi (3)
2024–25	(United Kingdom) Mia Brookes	(Japan) Mari Fukada	(New Zealand) Zoi Sadowski-Synnott
2025–26	(South Korea) Choi Ga-on	(Japan) Rise Kudo	(Japan) Sena Tomita

- Medals:

Rank	Nation	Gold	Silver	Bronze	Total
1	Japan	5	5	4	14
2	China	3	1	3	7
3	United States	2	5	3	10
4	Austria	2	1	0	3
5	Great Britain	1	1	1	3
6	Netherlands	1	0	1	2
7	Czech Republic	1	0	0	1
7	South Korea	1	0	0	1
9	Australia	0	1	0	1
9	Slovakia	0	1	0	1
9	Spain	0	1	0	1
12	France	0	0	2	2
13	Canada	0	0	1	1
13	New Zealand	0	0	1	1
Totals (14 entries)		16	16	16	48

===== Halfpipe (1994–) =====
Season	Winner	Runner-up	Third
1994–95	(United States) Sabrina Sadeghi	(United States) Annemarie Uliasz	(United States) Cammy Potter
1995–96	(Netherlands) Carolien van Kilsdonk	(United States) Annemarie Uliasz (2)	(Canada) Lori Glazier
1996–97	(Canada) Tara Teigen	(United States) Sabrina Sadeghi	(Canada) Maëlle Ricker
1997–98	(France) Doriane Vidal	(Germany) Sabine Wehr-Hasler	(Norway) Stine Brun Kjeldaas
1998–99	(United States) Tricia Byrnes	(France) Doriane Vidal	(United States) Kim Stacey
1999-00	(Germany) Sabine Wehr-Hasler	(United States) Tricia Byrnes	(Sweden) Anna Hellman
2000–01	(Germany) Sabine Wehr-Hasler (2)	(Norway) Stine Brun Kjeldaas	(United Kingdom) Lesley McKenna
2001–02	(Austria) Nicola Pederzolli	(Germany) Sabine Wehr-Hasler (2)	(France) Valerie Bourdier
2002–03	(Switzerland) Manuela Laura Pesko	(Japan) Soko Yamaoka	(Poland) Paulina Ligocka
2003–04	(Japan) Soko Yamaoka	(Australia) Torah Bright	(United Kingdom) Lesley McKenna (2)
2004–05	(Japan) Melo Imai	(Switzerland) Manuela Laura Pesko	(Japan) Soko Yamaoka
2005–06	(Switzerland) Manuela Laura Pesko	(Poland) Paulina Ligocka	(France) Sophie Rodriguez
2006–07	(Switzerland) Manuela Laura Pesko	(Australia) Holly Crawford	(Poland) Paulina Ligocka (2)
2007–08	(Switzerland) Manuela Laura Pesko (4)	(China) Liu Jiayu	(Spain) Queralt Castellet
2008–09	(China) Liu Jiayu	(Japan) Shiho Nakashima	(France) Sophie Rodriguez
2009–10	(China) Cai Xuetong	(China) Sun Zhifeng	(Australia) Holly Crawford
2010–11	(China) Cai Xuetong	(Australia) Holly Crawford (2)	(China) Sun Zhifeng
2011–12	(China) Cai Xuetong	(Spain) Queralt Castellet	(France) Emma Bernard
2012–13	(United States) Kelly Clark	(China) Liu Jiayu	(France) Sophie Rodriguez (3)
2013–14	(United States) Kelly Clark	(New Zealand) Rebecca Sinclair	(Japan) Rana Okada
2014–15	(United States) Kelly Clark (3)	(United States) Arielle Gold	(China) Cai Xuetong
2015–16	(China) Cai Xuetong	(United States) Kelly Clark	(United States) Chloe Kim
2016–17	(United States) Chloe Kim	(United States) Kelly Clark (2)	(China) Liu Jiayu
2017–18	(United States) Chloe Kim	(China) Liu Jiayu	(China) Cai Xuetong (2)
2018–19	(China) Cai Xuetong	(Spain) Queralt Castellet	(Switzerland) Verena Rohrer
2019–20	(China) Cai Xuetong	(China) Liu Jiayu (3)	(Spain) Queralt Castellet
2020–21	(United States) Chloe Kim (3)	(Japan) Mitsuki Ono	(Spain) Queralt Castellet (3)
2021–22	(China) Cai Xuetong (7)	(Japan) Sena Tomita	(Japan) Mitsuki Ono
2022–23	(Japan) Mitsuki Ono	(Canada) Elizabeth Hosking	(United States) Maddie Mastro
2023–24	(Japan) Mitsuki Ono (2)	(United States) Maddie Mastro	(United States) Bea Kim
2024–25	(United States) Maddie Mastro	(United States) Chloe Kim	(Japan) Sara Shimizu
2025–26	(South Korea) Choi Ga-on	(Japan) Rise Kudo	(Japan) Sena Tomita

- Medals:

Rank	Nation	Gold	Silver	Bronze	Total
1	United States	9	9	5	23
2	China	8	5	4	17
3	Japan	4	5	5	14
4	Switzerland	4	1	1	6
5	Germany	2	2	0	4
6	France	1	1	5	7
7	Canada	1	1	2	4
8	Austria	1	0	0	1
8	Netherlands	1	0	0	1
8	South Korea	1	0	0	1
11	Australia	0	3	1	4
12	Spain	0	2	3	5
13	Poland	0	1	2	3
14	Norway	0	1	1	2
15	New Zealand	0	1	0	1
16	Great Britain	0	0	2	2
17	Sweden	0	0	1	1
Totals (17 entries)		32	32	32	96

===== Big air (2010–, discontinuously) =====
Season	Winner	Second	Third
2010–11	(United States) Allyson Carroll (Poland) Katarzyna Rusin		(Croatia) Anja Štefan (Canada) Brooke Voigt
No discipline standings between 2011–12 and 2013–14 seasons
2014–15	(Netherlands) Cheryl Maas	(United States) Ty Walker	(Slovakia) Klaudia Medlová
2015–16	(United States) Jamie Anderson (United States) Julia Marino		(Canada) Jenna Blasman (United Kingdom) Katie Ormerod
2016–17	(Austria) Anna Gasser	(United Kingdom) Katie Ormerod	(United States) Julia Marino
2017–18	(Austria) Anna Gasser	(Japan) Miyabi Onitsuka	(United States) Julia Marino (2)
2018–19	(Japan) Reira Iwabuchi	(Japan) Miyabi Onitsuka (2)	(Slovakia) Klaudia Medlová
2019–20	(Japan) Reira Iwabuchi	(Canada) Brooke Voigt	(Japan) Miyabi Onitsuka
2020–21	(New Zealand) Zoi Sadowski-Synnott	(Japan) Kokomo Murase	(Austria) Anna Gasser
2021–22	(Austria) Anna Gasser (3)	(Japan) Reira Iwabuchi	(Japan) Kokomo Murase
2022–23	(Japan) Reira Iwabuchi (3)	(Japan) Kokomo Murase (2)	(Austria) Anna Gasser (2)
2023–24	(United Kingdom) Mia Brookes	(Japan) Mari Fukada	(Japan) Reira Iwabuchi
2024–25	(United Kingdom) Mia Brookes (2)	(Japan) Mari Fukada (2)	(Japan) Reira Iwabuchi (2)
2025–26	(Japan) Miyabi Onitsuka	(South Korea) Yu Seung-eun	(Japan) Mari Fukada

- Medals:

Rank	Nation	Gold	Silver	Bronze	Total
1	Japan	4	7	5	16
2	United States	3	1	2	6
3	Austria	3	0	2	5
4	Great Britain	2	1	1	4
5	Netherlands	1	0	0	1
5	New Zealand	1	0	0	1
5	Poland	1	0	0	1
8	Canada	0	1	2	3
9	South Korea	0	1	0	1
10	Slovakia	0	0	2	2
11	Croatia	0	0	1	1
Totals (11 entries)		15	11	15	41

===== Slope style (2011–) =====
Season	Winner	Runner-up	Third
2011–12	(Netherlands) Charlotte van Gils	(Canada) Brooke Voigt	(Canada) Breanna Stangeland
2012–13	(Norway) Kjersti Buaas	(United States) Jamie Anderson	(Finland) Enni Rukajärvi
2013–14	(Czech Republic) Šárka Pančochová	(Netherlands) Cheryl Maas	(New Zealand) Christy Prior
2014–15	(Netherlands) Cheryl Maas	(Slovakia) Klaudia Medlová	(Finland) Ella Suitiala
2015–16	(United States) Jamie Anderson	(United States) Karly Shorr	(Germany) Silvia Mittermueller
2016–17	(United States) Jamie Anderson (2)	(United States) Julia Marino	(Austria) Anna Gasser
2017–18	(Russia) Sofya Fyodorova	(Japan) Reira Iwabuchi	(Japan) Miyabi Onitsuka
2018–19	(Japan) Miyabi Onitsuka	(Japan) Reira Iwabuchi	(Switzerland) Isabel Derungs
2019–20	(United Kingdom) Katie Ormerod	(Canada) Laurie Blouin	(Canada) Brooke Voigt
2020–21	(Austria) Anna Gasser	(Japan) Kokomo Murase	(Australia) Tess Coady
2021–22	(Japan) Kokomo Murase	(Canada) Laurie Blouin (2)	(Canada) Jasmine Baird
2022–23	(United States) Julia Marino	(Japan) Miyabi Onitsuka	(United Kingdom) Mia Brookes
2023–24	(Japan) Kokomo Murase (2)	(Japan) Reira Iwabuchi (3)	(Germany) Annika Morgan
2024–25	(New Zealand) Zoi Sadowski-Synnott	(United Kingdom) Mia Brookes	(Japan) Kokomo Murase
2025–26	(United States) Lily Dhawornvej	(Japan) Kokomo Murase (2)	(Austria) Anna Gasser (2)

- Medals:

Rank	Nation	Gold	Silver	Bronze	Total
1	United States	4	3	0	7
2	Japan	3	6	2	11
3	Netherlands	2	1	0	3
4	Great Britain	1	1	1	3
5	Austria	1	0	2	3
6	New Zealand	1	0	1	2
7	Czech Republic	1	0	0	1
7	Norway	1	0	0	1
7	Russia	1	0	0	1
10	Canada	0	3	3	6
11	Slovakia	0	1	0	1
12	Finland	0	0	2	2
12	Germany	0	0	2	2
14	Australia	0	0	1	1
14	Switzerland	0	0	1	1
Totals (15 entries)		15	15	15	45

==== Snowboard cross (1996–) ====
Season	Winner	Runner-up	Third
1996–97	(France) Karine Ruby	(Austria) Manuela Riegler	(United States) Sondra Van Ert
1997–98	(Austria) Ursula Fingerlos	(Austria) Manuela Riegler	(Netherlands) Nicolien Sauerbreij
1998–99	(Austria) Ursula Fingerlos (2)	(Austria) Manuela Riegler (3)	(Sweden) Sophia Bergdahl
1999–00	(Germany) Sandra Farmand	(Italy) Carmen Ranigler	(Austria) Manuela Riegler
2000–01	(France) Karine Ruby	(Germany) Sandra Farmand	(France) Marie Laissus
2001–02	(Austria) Doresia Krings	(France) Marie Laissus	(Austria) Ursula Fingerlos
2002–03	(France) Karine Ruby	(Switzerland) Olivia Nobs	(France) Deborah Anthonioz
2003–04	(France) Karine Ruby (4)	(France) Julie Pomagalski	(United States) Lindsey Jacobellis
2004–05	(Austria) Doresia Krings (2)	(France) Deborah Anthonioz	(Italy) Carmen Ranigler
2005–06	(Canada) Dominique Maltais	(Canada) Maelle Ricker	(Austria) Doresia Krings
2006–07	(United States) Lindsey Jacobellis	(Switzerland) Tanja Frieden	(Canada) Maelle Ricker
2007–08	(Canada) Maelle Ricker	(United States) Lindsey Jacobellis	(Switzerland) Mellie Francon
2008–09	(United States) Lindsey Jacobellis (2)	(Canada) Maelle Ricker	(Switzerland) Sandra Frei
2009–10	(Canada) Maelle Ricker (2)	(Norway) Helene Olafsen	(Canada) Dominique Maltais
2010–11	(Canada) Dominique Maltais	(Bulgaria) Alexandra Jekova	(United States) Lindsey Jacobellis (2)
2011–12	(Canada) Dominique Maltais	(Canada) Maelle Ricker (3)	(Bulgaria) Alexandra Jekova
2012–13	(Canada) Dominique Maltais	(France) Nelly Moenne Loccoz	(Italy) Michela Moioli
2013–14	(Canada) Dominique Maltais (5)	(United States) Lindsey Jacobellis	(Bulgaria) Alexandra Jekova (2)
2014–15	(France) Nelly Moenne Loccoz	(Canada) Dominique Maltais	(Italy) Michela Moioli
2015–16	(Italy) Michela Moioli	(Czech Republic) Eva Samková	(Australia) Belle Brockhoff
2016–17	(Czech Republic) Eva Samková	(Italy) Michela Moioli	(Australia) Belle Brockhoff (2)
2017–18	(Italy) Michela Moioli	(France) Chloé Trespeuch	(France) Nelly Moenne Loccoz
2018–19	(Czech Republic) Eva Samková	(United States) Lindsey Jacobellis (3)	(Italy) Michela Moioli
2019–20	(Italy) Michela Moioli (3)	(Australia) Belle Brockhoff	(France) Chloé Trespeuch
2020–21	(Czech Republic) Eva Samková (3)	(Italy) Michela Moioli	(United States) Faye Gulini
2021–22	(United Kingdom) Charlotte Bankes	(Italy) Michela Moioli (3)	(France) Chloé Trespeuch (2)
2022–23	(United Kingdom) Charlotte Bankes	(France) Chloé Trespeuch	(Australia) Josie Baff
2023–24	(France) Chloé Trespeuch	(United Kingdom) Charlotte Bankes	(Italy) Michela Moioli (4)
2024–25	(France) Léa Casta	(United Kingdom) Charlotte Bankes (2)	(France) Julia Pereira de Sousa Mabileau
2025–26	(United Kingdom) Charlotte Bankes (3)	(France) Chloé Trespeuch (2)	(France) Léa Casta

- Medals:

Rank	Nation	Gold	Silver	Bronze	Total
1	France	7	7	7	21
2	Canada	7	4	2	13
3	Austria	4	3	3	10
4	Italy	3	4	5	12
5	Czech Republic	3	1	0	4
5	Great Britain	3	1	0	4
7	United States	2	3	4	9
8	Germany	1	2	0	3
9	Switzerland	0	2	2	4
10	Australia	0	1	3	4
11	Bulgaria	0	1	2	3
12	Norway	0	1	0	1
13	Netherlands	0	0	1	1
13	Sweden	0	0	1	1
Totals (14 entries)		30	30	30	90

=== Extinct disciplines ===
==== Overall (1994–2010) ====
Season	Winner	Second	Third
1994–95	(France) Karine Ruby	(Netherlands) Marcella Boema	(Germany) Heidi Renoth
1995–96	(France) Karine Ruby	(Austria) Manuela Riegler	(Austria) Birgit Herbert
1996–97	(France) Karine Ruby	(United States) Sondra Van Ert	(Austria) Manuela Riegler
1997–98	(France) Karine Ruby	(Austria) Manuela Riegler	(Austria) Ursula Fingerlos
1998–99	(Austria) Manuela Riegler	(France) Karine Ruby	(Austria) Ursula Fingerlos
1999–00	(Austria) Manuela Riegler	(France) Isabelle Blanc	(Italy) Margherita Parini
2000–01	(France) Karine Ruby	(Italy) Carmen Ranigler	(United States) Rosey Fletcher
2001–02	(France) Karine Ruby	(Austria) Doresia Krings	(Austria) Doris Günther
2002–03	(France) Karine Ruby	(Austria) Doresia Krings	(Austria) Ursula Fingerlos
2003–04	(France) Julie Pomagalski	(United States) Lindsey Jacobellis	(Austria) Doresia Krings
2004–05	(Switzerland) Daniela Meuli	(Switzerland) Ursula Bruhin	(Austria) Doris Günther
2005–06	(Switzerland) Daniela Meuli	(France) Julie Pomagalski	(Switzerland) Manuela Laura Pesko
2006–07	(Austria) Doresia Krings	(Austria) Heidi Neururer	(Switzerland) Fränzi Mägert-Kohli
2007–08	(Netherlands) Nicolien Sauerbreij	(United States) Lindsey Jacobellis	(Switzerland) Heidi Neururer
2008–09	(Austria) Doris Günther	(United States) Lindsey Jacobellis	(Germany) Amelie Kober
2009–10	(Canada) Maelle Ricker	(Netherlands) Nicolien Sauerbreij	(Austria) Doris Günther
No overall standings from this season.

==== Giant slalom (1994–2002) ====
Season	Winner	Second	Third
1994–95	(France) Karine Ruby	(Germany) Amalie Kulawik	(Austria) Alexandra Krings
1995–96	(France) Karine Ruby	(United States) Sondra Van Ert	(Austria) Ursula Fingerlos
1996–97	(France) Karine Ruby	(Italy) Margherita Parini	(United States) Sondra Van Ert
1997–98	(France) Karine Ruby	(France) Isabelle Blanc	(Italy) Lidia Trettel
1998–99	(Italy) Margherita Parini	(France) Karine Ruby	(United States) Sondra Van Ert
1999–00	(Italy) Margherita Parini	(France) Karine Ruby	(Austria) Manuela Riegler
2000–01	(France) Karine Ruby	(Italy) Marion Posch	(United States) Sondra Van Ert
2001–02	(Switzerland) Steffi von Siebenthal	(Germany) Heidi Renoth	(United States) Lisa Kosglow
No discipline standings from this season

==== Slalom (1994–1999) ====
Season	Winner	Second	Third
1994–95	(Netherlands) Marcella Boerma	(Germany) Heidi Renoth	(France) Karine Ruby
1995–96	(France) Karine Ruby	(Netherlands) Marcella Boerma	(Austria) Manuela Riegler
1996–97	(France) Karine Ruby	(Germany) Heidi Renoth	(Italy) Marion Posch
1997–98	(France) Karine Ruby	(Italy) Marion Posch	(Austria) Manuela Riegler
1998–99	(Italy) Marion Posch	(France) Karine Ruby	(Austria) Manuela Riegler
No discipline standings from this season

== All-time medal count ==
Rank	Nation	Gold	Silver	Bronze	Total
1	France	47	31	29	107
2	Austria	37	39	46	122
3	Switzerland	27	14	15	56
4	United States	22	29	26	77
5	Canada	19	15	12	46
6	Italy	15	14	9	38
7	Netherlands	11	9	8	28
8	Sweden	11	7	8	26
9	Finland	10	10	10	30
10	Germany	7	18	12	37
Totals (10 entries)		206	186	175	567

=== Most successful athletes ===
Rank	Athlete	Gold	Silver	Bronze	Total
1	(France) Karine Ruby	20	5	4	29
2	(France) Mathieu Bozzetto	9	6	1	16
3	(Switzerland) Patrizia Kummer	7	1	1	9
4	(Canada) Jasey-Jay Anderson	6	3	3	12
5	(Finland) Janne Korpi	6	2	0	8
6	(China) Cai Xuetong	6	1	1	8
7	(France) Pierre Vaultier	5	2	2	9
8	(Austria) Benjamin Karl	5	1	3	9
9	(Canada) Dominique Maltais	5	1	1	7
10	(Austria) Doresia Krings	4	2	2	8
Totals (10 entries)		73	24	18	115
