= 1995–96 FIS Snowboard World Cup =

International snowboarding competition

Snowboard World Cup 1995/96
Discipline	Men	Women
Overall	(United States) Mike Jacoby	(France) Karine Ruby
Giant slalom	(United States) Mike Jacoby	(France) Karine Ruby
Slalom	(Italy) Peter Pichler	(France) Karine Ruby
Halfpipe	(United States) Ross Powers	(Netherlands) Carolien van Kilsdonk

Competition
Locations	15	15
Individual	33	33

The 1995/96 FIS Snowboard World Cup was 2nd multi race tournament over a season for snowboarding organised by International Ski Federation. The season started on 21 November 1995 and ended on 17 March 1996. This season included four disciplines: parallel slalom, giant slalom, slalom and halfpipe.

== Men ==
=== Giant slalom ===
No.	Season	Date	Place	Event	Winner	Second	Third
9	1	21 November 1995	(Austria) Zell am See/Kaprun	GS	(Austria) Peter Pechhacker	(United States) Mike Jacoby	(United States) Thomas Lyman
10	2	22 November 1995	(Austria) Zell am See/Kaprun	GS	(United States) Mike Jacoby	(Austria) Peter Pechhacker	(United States) Thomas Lyman
11	3	1 December 1995	(Austria) Altenmarkt-Zauchensee	GS	(United States) Jeff Greenwood	(Austria) Harald Walder	(United States) Rob Berney
12	4	10 December 1995	(Italy) Bardonecchia	GS	(United States) Mike Jacoby	(United States) Rob Berney	(United States) Steve Persons
13	5	12 January 1996	(France) La Bresse	GS	(United States) Mike Jacoby	(Austria) Peter Pechhacker	(Austria) Harald Walder
14	6	4 February 1996	(Germany) Bad Hindelang-Oberjoch	GS	(Austria) Harald Walder	(Italy) Andrea Matteoli	(Austria) Stefan Kaltschütz
15	7	10 February 1996	(Japan) Kanbayashi	GS	(United States) Mike Jacoby	(Denmark) Mike Kildevæld	(United States) Bill Enos
16	8	16 February 1996	(Japan) Yomase	GS	(United States) Mike Jacoby	(United States) Jeff Greenwood	(Germany) Bernd Kroschewski
17	9	1 March 1996	(Canada) Sun Peaks	GS	(Austria) Stefan Kaltschütz	(Austria) Harald Walder	(Netherlands) Thedo Remmelink
18	10	10 March 1996	(United States) Alpine Meadows	GS	(Austria) Peter Pechhacker	(United States) Mike Jacoby	(Germany) Mathias Behounek
19	11	14 March 1996	(United States) Mount Bachelor	GS	(Austria) Harald Walder	(United States) Mike Jacoby	(Germany) Dieter Moherndl

=== Parallel ===
No.	Season	Date	Place	Event	Winner	Second	Third
6	1	3 December 1995	(Austria) Altenmarkt-Zauchensee	PSL	(Sweden) Ulf Maard	(France) Maxence Idesheim	(Italy) Peter Pichler
7	2	8 December 1995	(Italy) Sestriere	PSL	(Germany) Rainer Krug	(Austria) Helmut Pramstaller	(Austria) Stefan Kaltschütz
8	3	13 January 1996	(France) La Bresse	PSL	(Netherlands) Thedo Remmelink	(Italy) Peter Pichler	(France) Xavier Rolland
9	4	21 January 1996	(Italy) San Candido	PSL	(Italy) Ivo Rudiferia	(Germany) Rainer Krug	(United States) Tom O'Brien
10	5	3 February 1996	(Germany) Bad Hindelang-Oberjoch	PSL	(Austria) Helmut Pramstaller	(United States) Mike Jacoby	(Austria) Harald Walder
11	6	24 February 1996	(Canada) Calgary	PSL	(Germany) Dieter Moherndl	(Germany) Bernd Kroschewski	(United States) Tom O'Brien
12	7	2 March 1996	(Canada) Sun Peaks	PSL	(Austria) Helmut Pramstaller	(Sweden) Ulf Maard	(France) Maxence Idesheim
13	8	16 March 1996	(United States) Mount Bachelor	PSL	(France) Maxence Idesheim	(Italy) Peter Pichler	(Austria) Stefan Kaltschütz

=== Halfpipe ===
No.	Season	Date	Place	Event	Winner	Second	Third
6	1	18 January 1996	(Italy) San Candido	HP	(United States) Ross Powers	(United States) Dan Smith	(Japan) Shinichi Watanabe
7	2	19 January 1996	(Italy) San Candido	HP	(United States) Rob Kingwill	(United States) Ross Powers	(Sweden) Henrik Jansson
8	3	11 February 1996	(Japan) Kanbayashi	HP	(United States) Dan Smith	(United States) Lael Gregory	(United States) Ross Powers
9	4	17 February 1996	(Japan) Kanbayashi	HP	(United States) Ross Powers	(United States) Rob Kingwill	(United States) Dan Smith
10	5	25 February 1996	(Canada) Calgary	HP	(United States) Rob Kingwill	(United States) Ross Powers	(Canada) Derek Heidt
11	6	3 March 1996	(Canada) Sun Peaks	HP	(United States) Zach Horwitz	(United States) Dan Smith	(United States) Rob Kingwill
12	7	9 March 1996	(United States) Boreal Ridge	HP	(United States) Dan Smith	(United States) Lael Gregory	(United States) Jason Burkstede
13	8	17 March 1996	(United States) Mount Bachelor	HP	(United States) Rob Kingwill	(United States) Ross Powers	(United States) Zach Horwitz

=== Slalom ===
No.	Season	Date	Place	Event	Winner	Second	Third
6	1	2 December 1995	(Austria) Altenmarkt-Zauchensee	SL	(United States) Manuel Mendoza	(Germany) Dieter Moherndl	(Austria) Peter Pechhacker
7	2	9 December 1995	(Italy) Bardonecchia	SL	(Germany) Mathias Behounek	(Austria) Stefan Kaltschütz	(Austria) Helmut Pramstaller
8	3	20 January 1996	(Italy) San Candido	SL	(Netherlands) Thedo Remmelink	(Italy) Peter Pichler	(Sweden) Ulf Maard
9	4	12 February 1996	(Japan) Kanbayashi	SL	(Germany) Mathias Behounek	(United States) Mike Jacoby	(Austria) Stefan Kaltschütz
10	5	9 March 1996	(United States) Boreal Ridge	SL	(Germany) Rainer Krug	(Sweden) Ulf Maard	(United States) Mike Jacoby
11	6	15 March 1996	(United States) Mount Bachelor	SL	(Austria) Stefan Kaltschütz	(Italy) Peter Pichler	(France) Maxence Idesheim

== Ladies ==
=== Giant slalom ===
No.	Season	Date	Place	Event	Winner	Second	Third
9	1	21 November 1995	(Austria) Zell am See/Kaprun	GS	(France) Karine Ruby	(Germany) Heidi Renoth	(Austria) Birgit Herbert
10	2	22 November 1995	(Austria) Zell am See/Kaprun	GS	(Italy) Marion Posch	(Austria) Manuela Riegler	(United States) Sondra van Ert
11	3	1 December 1995	(Austria) Altenmarkt-Zauchensee	GS	(France) Karine Ruby	(Austria) Manuela Riegler	(Italy) Lidia Trettel
12	4	10 December 1995	(Italy) Bardonecchia	GS	(France) Karine Ruby	(Austria) Birgit Herbert	(Italy) Dagmar Mair u. d. Eggen
13	5	12 January 1996	(France) La Bresse	GS	(France) Karine Ruby	(Austria) Maria Kirchgasser-Pichler	(Austria) Alexandra Krings
14	6	4 February 1996	(Germany) Bad Hindelang-Oberjoch	GS	(Austria) Ursula Fingerlos	(Germany) Heidi Renoth	(Austria) Birgit Herbert
15	7	10 February 1996	(Japan) Kanbayashi	GS	(United States) Sondra van Ert	(Austria) Manuela Riegler	(France) Karine Ruby
16	8	16 February 1996	(Japan) Yomase	GS	(Austria) Alexandra Krings	(Germany) Amalie Kulawik	(France) Karine Ruby
17	9	1 March 1996	(Canada) Sun Peaks	GS	(Austria) Ursula Fingerlos	(Austria) Birgit Herbert	(United States) Sondra van Ert
18	10	10 March 1996	(United States) Alpine Meadows	GS	(Austria) Ursula Fingerlos	(France) Karine Ruby	(United States) Sondra van Ert
19	11	14 March 1996	(United States) Mount Bachelor	GS	(France) Karine Ruby	(United States) Sondra van Ert	(Austria) Manuela Riegler

=== Parallel ===
No.	Season	Date	Place	Event	Winner	Second	Third
6	1	3 December 1995	(Austria) Altenmarkt-Zauchensee	PSL	(France) Karine Ruby	(Germany) Steffi Prentl	(Austria) Manuela Riegler
7	2	8 December 1995	(Italy) Sestriere	PSL	(Austria) Birgit Herbert	(France) Karine Ruby	(Italy) Marion Posch
8	3	13 January 1996	(France) La Bresse	PSL	(France) Karine Ruby	(Germany) Heidi Renoth	(Germany) Steffi Prentl
9	4	21 January 1996	(Italy) San Candido	PSL	(France) Karine Ruby	(Italy) Marion Posch	(Netherlands) Marcella Boerma
10	5	3 February 1996	(Germany) Bad Hindelang-Oberjoch	PSL	(France) Dorothée Fournier	(Austria) Manuela Riegler	(Germany) Tanja Fischer
11	6	24 February 1996	(Canada) Calgary	PSL	(France) Karine Ruby	(Italy) Dagmar Mair unter der Eggen	(Italy) Marion Posch
12	7	2 March 1996	(Canada) Sun Peaks	PSL	(Austria) Manuela Riegler	(Germany) Tanja Fischer	(France) Karine Ruby
13	8	16 March 1996	(United States) Mount Bachelor	PSL	(Italy) Marion Posch	(France) Dorothée Fournier	(Italy) Dagmar Mair unter der Eggen

=== Halfpipe ===
No.	Season	Date	Place	Event	Winner	Second	Third
6	1	18 January 1996	(Italy) San Candido	HP	(Netherlands) Carolien van Kilsdonk	(United States) Annemarie Uliasz	(United States) Cammy Potter
7	2	19 January 1996	(Italy) San Candido	HP	(Netherlands) Carolien van Kilsdonk	(United States) Annemarie Uliasz	(Canada) Stacey Burke
8	3	11 February 1996	(Japan) Kanbayashi	HP	(Netherlands) Carolien van Kilsdonk	(United States) Annemarie Uliasz	(Canada) Candice Drouin
9	4	17 February 1996	(Japan) Kanbayashi	HP	(Netherlands) Carolien van Kilsdonk	(Japan) Naomi Azuma	(Canada) Stacey Burke
10	5	25 February 1996	(Canada) Calgary	HP	(Netherlands) Carolien van Kilsdonk	(Canada) Lori Glazier	(Canada) Candice Drouin
11	6	3 March 1996	(Canada) Sun Peaks	HP	(Canada) Lori Glazier	(Netherlands) Carolien van Kilsdonk	(United States) Annemarie Uliasz
12	7	9 March 1996	(United States) Boreal Ridge	HP	(United States) Annemarie Uliasz	(Canada) Lori Glazier	(Netherlands) Carolien van Kilsdonk
13	8	17 March 1996	(United States) Mount Bachelor	HP	(Netherlands) Carolien van Kilsdonk	(Canada) Kelly Kaye	(Canada) Lori Glazier

=== Slalom ===
No.	Season	Date	Place	Event	Winner	Second	Third
6	1	2 December 1995	(Austria) Altenmarkt-Zauchensee	SL	(Germany) Heidi Renoth	(Austria) Manuela Riegler	(Austria) Birgit Herbert
7	2	9 December 1995	(Italy) Bardonecchia	SL	(France) Karine Ruby	(Austria) Manuela Riegler	(United States) Sondra van Ert
8	3	20 January 1996	(Italy) San Candido	SL	(Netherlands) Marcella Boerma	(France) Karine Ruby	(Germany) Tanja Fischer
9	4	12 February 1996	(Japan) Kanbayashi	SL	(Germany) Heidi Renoth	(United States) Stacia Hookom	(France) Karine Ruby
10	5	9 March 1996	(United States) Boreal Ridge	SL	(France) Karine Ruby	(Netherlands) Marcella Boerma	(Austria) Birgit Herbert
11	6	15 March 1996	(United States) Mount Bachelor	SL	(France) Karine Ruby	(Germany) Heidi Renoth	(Austria) Birgit Herbert

== Standings: Men ==
Overall
Rank	Name	Points
1	(United States) Mike Jacoby	1243
2	(Austria) Stefan Wurzacher	957
3	(Netherlands) Thedo Remmelink	896
4	(Austria) Harald Walder	895
5	(Austria) Peter Pechhacker	824

Giant slalom
Rank	Name	Points
1.	(United States) Mike Jacoby	7900
2.	(Austria) Peter Pechhacker	5820
3.	(Austria) Harald Walder	5760
4.	(Netherlands) Thedo Remmelink	4160
5.	(Austria) Stefan Wurzacher	3530

Slalom
Rank	Name	Points
1.	(Italy) Peter Pichler	6320
2.	(Austria) Stefan Wurzacher	6210
3.	(France) Maxence Idesheim	5480
4.	(Germany) Dieter Moherndl	5160
5.	(Sweden) Ulf Maard	5110

Halfpipe
Rank	Name	Points
1.	(United States) Ross Powers	5000
2.	(United States) Rob Kingwill	4760
3.	(United States) Dan Smith	4700
4.	(United States) Lael Gregory	3400
5.	(United States) Zach Horwitz	3040

== Standings: Women ==
Overall
Rank	Name	Points
1	(France) Karine Ruby	1761
2	(Austria) Manuela Riegler	1024
3	(Austria) Birgit Herbert	1019
4	(Italy) Marion Posch	893
5	(Germany) Heidi Renoth	886

Giant slalom
Rank	Name	Points
1	(France) Karine Ruby	7500
2	(United States) Sondra van Ert	5190
3	(Austria) Ursula Fingerlos	4950
4	(Austria) Birgit Herbert	4840
5	(Austria) Manuela Riegler	4670

Slalom
Rank	Name	Points
1	(France) Karine Ruby	10200
2	(Netherlands) Marcella Boerma	5590
3	(Austria) Manuela Riegler	5560
4	(Austria) Birgit Herbert	5290
4	(Italy) Marion Posch	5290

Halfpipe
Rank	Name	Points
1	(Netherlands) Carolien van Kilsdonk	6000
2	(United States) Annemarie Uliasz	4500
3	(Canada) Lori Glazier	3200
4	(Canada) Candice Drouin	3100
5	(Canada) Stacey Burke	2740

== Podium table by nation ==
Table showing the World Cup podium places (gold–1st place, silver–2nd place, bronze–3rd place) by the countries represented by the athletes.

Rank	Nation	Gold	Silver	Bronze	Total
1	United States	17	20	18	55
2	France	14	5	7	26
3	Austria	13	15	16	44
4	Netherlands	9	2	3	14
5	Germany	7	9	6	22
6	Italy	3	7	6	16
7	Canada	1	3	6	10
8	Sweden	1	2	2	5
9	Japan	0	1	1	2
10	Denmark	0	1	0	1
Totals (10 entries)		65	65	65	195

== See also ==
- FIS Snowboarding World Championships 1996
