= FIS Snowboard World Championships =

International snowboarding competition

FIS Snowboarding World Championships
- Status: active
- Genre: wintersports event
- Date: January–March
- Frequency: every 2 years
- Country: varying
- Inaugurated: 1996

The FIS Snowboarding World Championships is the world championship organized by the FIS for Snowboarding. It was first held in 1996 and is now held every odd year. The championship events include Big air, Halfpipe, Parallel giant slalom, Parallel slalom, Slopestyle and Snowboard cross for both genders as well as mixed team events in Parallel slalom and Snowboard cross.

== Host cities ==
Edition	Year	City	Country	Dates	Events **
FIS Snowboard World Championships
1st	1996	Lienz	Austria	24–28 January	6
2nd	1997	Innichen	Italy	21–26 January	10
3rd	1999	Berchtesgaden	Germany	12–19 January	10
4th	2001	Madonna di Campiglio	Italy	22–28 January	10
5th	2003	Kreischberg	Austria	13–19 January	9
6th	2005	Whistler, British Columbia	Canada	16–22 January	9
7th	2007	Arosa	Switzerland	14–20 January	9
8th	2009	Gangwon	South Korea	17–24 January	9
9th	2011	La Molina / Barcelona	Spain	14–22 January	11
10th	2013	Stoneham-et-Tewkesbury, Quebec	Canada	18–27 January	11
FIS Freestyle Ski and Snowboarding World Championships *
11th	2015	Kreischberg	Austria	15–25 January	12 + 12
12th	2017	Sierra Nevada	Spain	7–19 March	14 + 12
13th	2019	Utah	United States	1–10 February	11 + 14
14th	2021	Idre	Sweden	11–13 February	3 + 2
14th	2021	Rogla	Slovenia	1–2 March	4 + 0
14th	2021	Almaty	Kazakhstan	8–11 March	0 + 7
14th	2021	Aspen	United States	10–16 March	6 + 6
15th	2023	Bakuriani	Georgia	19 February – 4 March	14 + 16
16th	2025	Engadin	Switzerland	18–30 March	14 + 16
17th	2027	Montafon	Austria		
18th	2029	Zhangjiakou	China		

* Starting from 2015, it combined with the FIS Freestyle World Ski Championships.
** Second numbers in italic denotes number of freestyle ski events at the combined editions.

== Men's results ==
Numbers in brackets denotes number of victories in corresponding disciplines. Boldface denotes record number of victories.

=== Alpine ===
==== Parallel slalom ====
Year	Gold	Silver	Bronze
1996 Lienz	Ivo Rudiferia (ITA)	Rainer Krug (GER)	Helmut Pramstaller (AUT)
1997 Innichen	Mike Jacoby (USA)	Elmar Messner (ITA)	Bernd Kroschewski (GER)
1999 Berchtesgaden	Nicolas Huet (FRA)	Mathieu Bozzetto (FRA)	Werner Ebenbauer (AUT)
2001 Madonna di Campiglio	Gilles Jacquet (SUI)	Daniel Biveson (SWE)	Stefan Kaltschütz (AUT)
2003 Kreischberg	Siegfried Grabner (AUT)	Mathieu Bozzetto (FRA)	Simon Schoch (SUI)
2005 Whistler	Jasey-Jay Anderson (CAN)	Nicolas Huet (FRA)	Siegfried Grabner (AUT)
2007 Arosa	Simon Schoch (SUI)	Philipp Schoch (SUI)	Rok Flander (SLO)
2009 Gangwon	Benjamin Karl (AUT)	Sylvain Dufour (FRA)	Patrick Bussler (GER)
2011 La Molina	Benjamin Karl (AUT)	Simon Schoch (SUI)	Rok Marguč (SLO)
2013 Stoneham-et-Tewkesbury	Rok Marguč (SLO)	Justin Reiter (USA)	Roland Fischnaller (ITA)
2015 Kreischberg	Roland Fischnaller (ITA)	Andrey Sobolev (RUS)	Rok Marguč (SLO)
2017 Sierra Nevada	Andreas Prommegger (AUT)	Benjamin Karl (AUT)	Andrey Sobolev (RUS)
2019 Utah	Dmitry Loginov (RUS)	Roland Fischnaller (ITA)	Stefan Baumeister (GER)
2021 Rogla	Benjamin Karl (AUT) **(3)**	Andreas Prommegger (AUT)	(Russia) Dmitry Loginov (RSF)
2023 Bakuriani	Andreas Prommegger (AUT) (2)	Arvid Auner (AUT)	Arnaud Gaudet (CAN)
2025 Engadin	Tervel Zamfirov (BUL)	Arvid Auner (AUT)	Aaron March (ITA)

Medal table

Rank	Nation	Gold	Silver	Bronze	Total
1	Austria	6	4	4	14
2	Italy	2	2	2	6
3	Switzerland	2	2	1	5
4	France	1	4	0	5
5	Russia	1	1	1	3
6	United States	1	1	0	2
7	Slovenia	1	0	3	4
8	Canada	1	0	1	2
9	Bulgaria	1	0	0	1
10	Germany	0	1	3	4
11	Sweden	0	1	0	1
12	(Russia) Russian Ski Federation	0	0	1	1
Totals (12 entries)		**16**	**16**	**16**	**48**

==== Giant slalom (discontinued) ====
Year	Gold	Silver	Bronze
1996 Lienz	Jeff Greenwood (USA)	Mike Jacoby (USA)	Helmut Pramstaller (AUT)
1997 Innichen	Thomas Prugger (ITA)	Mike Jacoby (USA)	Ian Price (USA)
1999 Berchtesgaden	Markus Ebner (GER)	Maxence Idesheim (FRA)	Stefan Kaltschütz (AUT)
2001 Madonna di Campiglio	Jasey-Jay Anderson (CAN)	Dejan Košir (SLO)	Walter Feichter (ITA)

Medal table

Rank	Nation	Gold	Silver	Bronze	Total
1	United States	1	2	1	4
2	Italy	1	0	1	2
3	Canada	1	0	0	1
3	Germany	1	0	0	1
5	France	0	1	0	1
5	Slovenia	0	1	0	1
7	Austria	0	0	2	2
Totals (7 entries)		**4**	**4**	**4**	**12**

==== Slalom (discontinued) ====
Year	Gold	Silver	Bronze
1997 Innichen	Bernd Kroschewski (GER)	Dieter Moherndl (GER)	Anton Pogue (USA)

Medal table

Rank	Nation	Gold	Silver	Bronze	Total
1	Germany	1	1	0	2
2	United States	0	0	1	1
Totals (2 entries)		**1**	**1**	**1**	**3**

==== Parallel giant slalom ====
Year	Gold	Silver	Bronze
1999 Berchtesgaden	Richard Rikardsson (SWE)	Stefan Kaltschütz (AUT)	Herald Walter (AUT)
2001 Madonna di Campiglio	Nicolas Huet (FRA)	Mathieu Chiquet (FRA)	Anton Pogue (USA)
2003 Kreischberg	Dejan Košir (SLO)	Simon Schoch (SUI)	Nicolas Huet (FRA)
2005 Whistler	Jasey-Jay Anderson (CAN)	Urs Eiselin (SUI)	Nicolas Huet (FRA)
2007 Arosa	Rok Flander (SLO)	Philipp Schoch (SUI)	Heinz Inniger (SUI)
2009 Gangwon	Jasey-Jay Anderson (CAN) **(2)**	Sylvain Dufour (FRA)	Matthew Morison (CAN)
2011 La Molina	Benjamin Karl (AUT)	Rok Marguč (SLO)	Roland Fischnaller (ITA)
2013 Stoneham-et-Tewkesbury	Benjamin Karl (AUT) **(2)**	Roland Fischnaller (ITA)	Vic Wild (RUS)
2015 Kreischberg	Andrey Sobolev (RUS)	Žan Košir (SLO)	Benjamin Karl (AUT)
2017 Sierra Nevada	Andreas Prommegger (AUT)	Benjamin Karl (AUT)	Nevin Galmarini (SUI)
2019 Utah	Dmitry Loginov (RUS)	Tim Mastnak (SLO)	Stefan Baumeister (GER)
2021 Rogla	(Russia) Dmitry Loginov (RSF) **(2)**	Roland Fischnaller (ITA)	(Russia) Andrey Sobolev (RSF)
2023 Bakuriani	Oskar Kwiatkowski (POL)	Dario Caviezel (SUI)	Alexander Payer (AUT)
2025 Engadin	Roland Fischnaller (ITA)	Stefan Baumeister (GER)	Lee Sang-ho (KOR)

Medal table

Rank	Nation	Gold	Silver	Bronze	Total
1	Austria	3	2	3	8
2	Slovenia	2	3	0	5
3	Canada	2	0	1	3
3	Russia	2	0	1	3
5	France	1	2	2	5
6	Italy	1	2	1	4
7	(Russia) Russian Ski Federation	1	0	1	2
8	Poland	1	0	0	1
8	Sweden	1	0	0	1
10	Switzerland	0	4	2	6
11	Germany	0	1	1	2
12	South Korea	0	0	1	1
12	United States	0	0	1	1
Totals (13 entries)		**14**	**14**	**14**	**42**

=== Freestyle ===
==== Halfpipe ====
Year	Gold	Silver	Bronze
1996 Lienz	Ross Powers (USA)	Lael Gregory (USA)	Rob Kingwill (USA)
1997 Innichen	Fabien Rohrer (SUI)	Markus Hurme (FIN)	Roger Hjelmstadstuen (NOR)
1999 Berchtesgaden	Ricky Bower (USA)	Fredrick Sterner (SWE)	Timo Aho (FIN)
2001 Madonna di Campiglio	Kim Christiansen (NOR)	Daniel Franck (NOR)	Markus Hurme (FIN)
2003 Kreischberg	Markus Keller (SUI)	Stefan Karlsson (SWE)	Steve Fisher (USA)
2005 Whistler	Antti Autti (FIN)	Justin Lamoureux (CAN)	Kim Christiansen (NOR)
2007 Arosa	Mathieu Crépel (FRA)	Kazuhiro Kokubo (JPN)	Brad Martin (CAN)
2009 Gangwon	Ryō Aono (JPN)	Jeff Batchelor (CAN)	Mathieu Crépel (FRA)
2011 La Molina	Nathan Johnstone (AUS)	Iouri Podladtchikov (SUI)	Markus Malin (FIN)
2013 Stoneham-et-Tewkesbury	Iouri Podladtchikov (SUI)	Taku Hiraoka (JPN)	Markus Malin (FIN)
2015 Kreischberg	Scotty James (AUS)	Zhang Yiwei (CHN)	Tim-Kevin Ravnjak (SLO)
2017 Sierra Nevada	Scotty James (AUS)	Iouri Podladtchikov (SUI)	Patrick Burgener (SUI)
2019 Utah	Scotty James (AUS)	Yūto Totsuka (JPN)	Patrick Burgener (SUI)
2021 Aspen	Yūto Totsuka (JPN)	Scotty James (AUS)	Jan Scherrer (SUI)
2023 Bakuriani	Chaeun Lee (KOR)	Valentino Guseli (AUS)	Jan Scherrer (SUI)
2025 Engadin	Scotty James (AUS) **(4)**	Ruka Hirano (JPN)	Yūto Totsuka (JPN)

Medal table

Rank	Nation	Gold	Silver	Bronze	Total
1	Australia	5	2	0	7
2	Switzerland	3	2	4	9
3	Japan	2	4	1	7
4	United States	2	1	2	5
5	Finland	1	1	4	6
6	Norway	1	1	2	4
7	France	1	0	1	2
8	South Korea	1	0	0	1
9	Canada	0	2	1	3
10	Sweden	0	2	0	2
11	China	0	1	0	1
12	Slovenia	0	0	1	1
Totals (12 entries)		**16**	**16**	**16**	**48**

==== Big air ====
Year	Gold	Silver	Bronze
2003 Kreischberg	Risto Mattila (FIN)	Simon Ax (SWE)	Antti Autti (FIN)
2005 Whistler	Antti Autti (FIN)	Matevž Petek (SLO)	Andreas Jakobssen (SWE)
2007 Arosa	Mathieu Crépel (FRA)	Antti Autti (FIN)	Janne Korpi (FIN)
2009 Gangwon	Markku Koski (FIN)	Seppe Smits (BEL)	Stefan Gimpl (AUT)
2011 La Molina	Petja Piiroinen (FIN)	Seppe Smits (BEL)	Rocco van Straten (NED)
2013 Stoneham-et-Tewkesbury	Roope Tonteri (FIN)	Niklas Mattsson (SWE)	Seppe Smits (BEL)
2015 Kreischberg	Roope Tonteri (FIN) **(2)**	Darcy Sharpe (CAN)	Kyle Mack (USA)
2017 Sierra Nevada	Ståle Sandbech (NOR)	Chris Corning (USA)	Marcus Kleveland (NOR)
2019 Utah	Cancelled		
2021 Aspen	Mark McMorris (CAN)	Max Parrot (CAN)	Marcus Kleveland (NOR)
2023 Bakuriani	Taiga Hasegawa (JPN)	Mons Røisland (NOR)	Nicolas Huber (SUI)
2025 Engadin	Ryoma Kimata (JPN)	Taiga Hasegawa (JPN)	Oliver Martin (USA)

Medal table

Rank	Nation	Gold	Silver	Bronze	Total
1	Finland	6	1	2	9
2	Japan	2	1	0	3
3	Canada	1	2	0	3
4	Norway	1	1	2	4
5	France	1	0	0	1
6	Belgium	0	2	1	3
6	Sweden	0	2	1	3
8	United States	0	1	2	3
9	Slovenia	0	1	0	1
10	Austria	0	0	1	1
10	Netherlands	0	0	1	1
10	Switzerland	0	0	1	1
Totals (12 entries)		**11**	**11**	**11**	**33**

==== Slopestyle ====
Year	Gold	Silver	Bronze
2011 La Molina	Seppe Smits (BEL)	Niklas Mattsson (SWE)	Ville Paumola (FIN)
2013 Stoneham-et-Tewkesbury	Roope Tonteri (FIN)	Mark McMorris (CAN)	Janne Korpi (FIN)
2015 Kreischberg	Ryan Stassel (USA)	Roope Tonteri (FIN)	Kyle Mack (USA)
2017 Sierra Nevada	Seppe Smits (BEL) **(2)**	Nicolas Huber (SUI)	Chris Corning (USA)
2019 Utah	Chris Corning (USA)	Mark McMorris (CAN)	Judd Henkes (USA)
2021 Aspen	Marcus Kleveland (NOR)	Sébastien Toutant (CAN)	Rene Rinnekangas (FIN)
2023 Bakuriani	Marcus Kleveland (NOR) **(2)**	Ryoma Kimata (JPN)	Chris Corning (USA)
2025 Engadin	Liam Brearley (CAN)	Su Yiming (CHN)	Oliver Martin (USA)

Medal table

Rank	Nation	Gold	Silver	Bronze	Total
1	United States	2	0	5	7
2	Belgium	2	0	0	2
2	Norway	2	0	0	2
4	Canada	1	3	0	4
5	Finland	1	1	3	5
6	China	0	1	0	1
6	Japan	0	1	0	1
6	Sweden	0	1	0	1
6	Switzerland	0	1	0	1
Totals (9 entries)		**8**	**8**	**8**	**24**

=== Snowboard cross ===
==== Snowboard cross ====
Year	Gold	Silver	Bronze
1997 Innichen	Helmut Pramstaller (AUT)	Klaus Stammer (AUT)	Jakog Bergstedt (SWE)
1999 Berchtesgaden	Henrik Jansson (SWE)	Magnus Sterner (SWE)	Zeke Steggall (AUS)
2001 Madonna di Campiglio	Guillaume Nantermod (SUI)	Markus Ebner (GER)	Alexander Maier (AUT)
2003 Kreischberg	Xavier de Le Rue (FRA)	Seth Wescott (USA)	Drew Neilson (CAN)
2005 Whistler	Seth Wescott (USA)	Francois Boivin (CAN)	Jayson Hale (USA)
2007 Arosa	Xavier de Le Rue (FRA) **(2)**	Seth Wescott (USA)	Nate Holland (USA)
2009 Gangwon	Markus Schairer (AUT)	Xavier de Le Rue (FRA)	Nick Baumgartner (USA)
2011 La Molina	Alex Pullin (AUS)	Seth Wescott (USA)	Nate Holland (USA)
2013 Stoneham-et-Tewkesbury	Alex Pullin (AUS) **(2)**	Markus Schairer (AUT)	Stian Sivertzen (NOR)
2015 Kreischberg	Luca Matteotti (ITA)	Kevin Hill (CAN)	Nick Baumgartner (USA)
2017 Sierra Nevada	Pierre Vaultier (FRA)	Lucas Eguibar (ESP)	Alex Pullin (AUS)
2019 Utah	Mick Dierdorff (USA)	Hanno Douschan (AUT)	Emanuel Perathoner (ITA)
2021 Idre	Lucas Eguibar (ESP)	Alessandro Hämmerle (AUT)	Éliot Grondin (CAN)
2023 Bakuriani	Jakob Dusek (AUT)	Martin Nörl (GER)	Omar Visintin (ITA)
2025 Engadin	Éliot Grondin (CAN)	Loan Bozzolo (FRA)	Alessandro Hämmerle (AUT)

Medal table

Rank	Nation	Gold	Silver	Bronze	Total
1	Austria	3	4	2	9
2	France	3	2	0	5
3	United States	2	3	5	10
4	Australia	2	0	2	4
5	Canada	1	2	2	5
6	Sweden	1	1	1	3
7	Spain	1	1	0	2
8	Italy	1	0	2	3
9	Switzerland	1	0	0	1
10	Germany	0	2	0	2
11	Norway	0	0	1	1
Totals (11 entries)		**15**	**15**	**15**	**45**

==== Team snowboard cross (discontinued) ====
Year	Gold	Silver	Bronze
2017 Sierra Nevada	Hagen Kearney; Nick Baumgartner; United States	Regino Hernández; Lucas Eguibar; Spain	Kevin Hill; Chris Robanske; Canada

Medal table

Rank	Nation	Gold	Silver	Bronze	Total
1	United States	1	0	0	1
2	Spain	0	1	0	1
3	Canada	0	0	1	1
Totals (3 entries)		**1**	**1**	**1**	**3**

== Women's results ==
Numbers in brackets denotes number of victories in corresponding disciplines. Boldface denotes record number of victories.

=== Alpine ===
==== Parallel slalom ====
Year	Gold	Silver	Bronze
1996 Lienz	Marion Posch (ITA)	Marcella Boerma (NED)	Sondra van Ert (USA)
1997 Innichen	Dagmar Mair unter der Eggen (ITA)	Karine Ruby (FRA)	Marie Birkl (SWE)
1999 Berchtesgaden	Marion Posch (ITA) **(2)**	Isabelle Blanc (FRA)	Sandra Farmand (GER)
2001 Madonna di Campiglio	Karine Ruby (FRA)	Isabelle Blanc (FRA)	Carmen Ranigler (ITA)
2003 Kreischberg	Isabelle Blanc (FRA)	Karine Ruby (FRA)	Sara Fischer (SWE)
2005 Whistler	Daniela Mueli (SUI)	Heidi Neururer (AUT)	Doresia Krings (AUT)
2007 Arosa	Heidi Neururer (AUT)	Marion Kreiner (AUT)	Doresia Krings (AUT)
2009 Gangwon	Fränzi Mägert-Kohli (SUI)	Doris Günther (AUT)	Ekaterina Tudegesheva (RUS)
2011 La Molina	Hilde-Katrine Engeli (NOR)	Nicolien Sauerbreij (NED)	Claudia Riegler (AUT)
2013 Stoneham-et-Tewkesbury	Ekaterina Tudegesheva (RUS)	Patrizia Kummer (SUI)	Amelie Kober (GER)
2015 Kreischberg	Ester Ledecká (CZE)	Julia Dujmovits (AUT)	Marion Kreiner (AUT)
2017 Sierra Nevada	Daniela Ulbing (AUT)	Ester Ledecká (CZE)	Alena Zavarzina (RUS)
2019 Utah	Julie Zogg (SUI)	Annamari Dancha (UKR)	Ramona Theresia Hofmeister (GER)
2021 Rogla	(Russia) Sofia Nadyrshina (RSF)	Ramona Theresia Hofmeister (GER)	Selina Jörg (GER)
2023 Bakuriani	Julie Zogg (SUI) **(2)**	Ladina Jenny (SUI)	Sabine Schöffmann (AUT)
2025 Engadin	Tsubaki Miki (JPN)	Ester Ledecká (CZE)	Michelle Dekker (NED)

Medal table

Rank	Nation	Gold	Silver	Bronze	Total
1	Switzerland	4	2	0	6
2	Italy	3	0	1	4
3	Austria	2	4	5	11
4	France	2	4	0	6
5	Czech Republic	1	2	0	3
6	Russia	1	0	2	3
7	Japan	1	0	0	1
7	Norway	1	0	0	1
7	(Russia) Russian Ski Federation	1	0	0	1
10	Netherlands	0	2	1	3
11	Germany	0	1	4	5
12	Ukraine	0	1	0	1
13	Sweden	0	0	2	2
14	United States	0	0	1	1
Totals (14 entries)		**16**	**16**	**16**	**48**

==== Giant slalom (discontinued) ====
Year	Gold	Silver	Bronze
1996 Lienz	Karine Ruby (FRA)	Manuela Riegler (AUT)	Sondra van Ert (USA)
1997 Innichen	Sondra van Ert (USA)	Karine Ruby (FRA)	Margherita Parini (ITA)
1999 Berchtesgaden	Margherita Parini (ITA)	Lidia Trettel (ITA)	Sandra van Ert (USA)
2001 Madonna di Campiglio	Karine Ruby (FRA) **(2)**	Isabelle Blanc (FRA)	Dagmar Mair unter der Eggen (ITA)

Medal table

Rank	Nation	Gold	Silver	Bronze	Total
1	France	2	2	0	4
2	Italy	1	1	2	4
3	United States	1	0	2	3
4	Austria	0	1	0	1
Totals (4 entries)		**4**	**4**	**4**	**12**

==== Slalom (discontinued) ====
Year	Gold	Silver	Bronze
1997 Innichen	Heidi Renoth (GER)	Dagmar Mair unter der Eggen (ITA)	Dorothée Fournier (FRA)

Medal table

Rank	Nation	Gold	Silver	Bronze	Total
1	Germany	1	0	0	1
2	Italy	0	1	0	1
3	France	0	0	1	1
Totals (3 entries)		**1**	**1**	**1**	**3**

==== Parallel giant slalom ====
Year	Gold	Silver	Bronze
1999 Berchtesgaden	Isabelle Blanc (FRA)	Rosey Fletcher (USA)	Aasa Windahl (SWE)
2001 Madonna di Campiglio	Ursula Bruhin (SUI)	Rosey Fletcher (USA)	Manuela Riegler (AUT)
2003 Kreischberg	Ursula Bruhin (SUI) **(2)**	Julie Pomagalski (FRA)	Heidi Renoth (GER)
2005 Whistler	Manuela Riegler (AUT)	Svetlana Boldikova (RUS)	Doresia Krings (AUT)
2007 Arosa	Ekaterina Tudegesheva (RUS)	Amelie Kober (GER)	Fränzi Kohli (SUI)
2009 Gangwon	Marion Kreiner (AUT)	Doris Günther (AUT)	Patrizia Kummer (SUI)
2011 La Molina	Alena Zavarzina (RUS)	Claudia Riegler (AUT)	Doris Günther (AUT)
2013 Stoneham-et-Tewkesbury	Isabella Laböck (GER)	Julia Dujmovits (AUT)	Amelie Kober (GER)
2015 Kreischberg	Claudia Riegler (AUT)	Alena Zavarzina (RUS)	Tomoka Takeuchi (JPN)
2017 Sierra Nevada	Ester Ledecká (CZE)	Patrizia Kummer (SUI)	Ekaterina Tudegesheva (RUS)
2019 Utah	Selina Jörg (GER)	Natalia Soboleva (RUS)	Ladina Jenny (SUI)
2021 Rogla	Selina Jörg (GER) **(2)**	(Russia) Sofia Nadyrshina (RSF)	Julia Dujmovits (AUT)
2023 Bakuriani	Tsubaki Miki (JPN)	Daniela Ulbing (AUT)	Aleksandra Król (POL)
2025 Engadin	Ester Ledecká (CZE) **(2)**	Tsubaki Miki (JPN)	Aleksandra Król-Walas (POL)

Medal table

Rank	Nation	Gold	Silver	Bronze	Total
1	Austria	3	4	4	11
2	Germany	3	1	2	6
3	Russia	2	3	1	6
4	Switzerland	2	1	3	6
5	Czech Republic	2	0	0	2
6	Japan	1	1	1	3
7	France	1	1	0	2
8	United States	0	2	0	2
9	(Russia) Russian Ski Federation	0	1	0	1
10	Poland	0	0	2	2
11	Sweden	0	0	1	1
Totals (11 entries)		**14**	**14**	**14**	**42**

=== Freestyle ===
==== Halfpipe ====
Year	Gold	Silver	Bronze
1996 Lienz	Caroline van Kilsdonk (NED)	Annemarie Uliasz (USA)	Cammy Potter (USA)
1997 Innichen	Anita Schwaller (SUI)	Christel Thoresen (NOR)	Sabine Wehr-Hasler (GER)
1999 Berchtesgaden	Kim Stacey (USA)	Doriane Vidal (FRA)	Anna Hellman (SWE)
2001 Madonna di Campiglio	Doriane Vidal (FRA)	Stine Kjeldaas (NOR)	Sari Gronholm (FIN)
2003 Kreischberg	Doriane Vidal (FRA)	Nicola Pederzolli (AUT)	Fabienne Reuteler (SUI)
2005 Whistler	Doriane Vidal (FRA) **(3)**	Manuela Laura Pesko (SUI)	Hannah Teter (USA)
2007 Arosa	Manuela Laura Pesko (SUI)	Soko Yamaoka (JPN)	Paulina Ligocka (POL)
2009 Gangwon	Liu Jiayu (CHN)	Holly Crawford (AUS)	Paulina Ligocka (POL)
2011 La Molina	Holly Crawford (AUS)	Ursina Haller (SUI)	Liu Jiayu (CHN)
2013 Stoneham-et-Tewkesbury	Arielle Gold (USA)	Holly Crawford (AUS)	Sophie Rodriguez (FRA)
2015 Kreischberg	Cai Xuetong (CHN)	Queralt Castellet (ESP)	Clémence Grimal (FRA)
2017 Sierra Nevada	Cai Xuetong (CHN)	Haruna Matsumoto (JPN)	Clémence Grimal (FRA)
2019 Utah	Chloe Kim (USA)	Cai Xuetong (CHN)	Maddie Mastro (USA)
2021 Aspen	Chloe Kim (USA)	Maddie Mastro (USA)	Queralt Castellet (ESP)
2023 Bakuriani	Cai Xuetong (CHN) **(3)**	Elizabeth Hosking (CAN)	Mitsuki Ono (JPN)
2025 Engadin	Chloe Kim (USA) **(3)**	Sara Shimizu (JPN)	Mitsuki Ono (JPN)

Medal table

Rank	Nation	Gold	Silver	Bronze	Total
1	United States	5	2	3	10
2	China	4	1	1	6
3	France	3	1	3	7
4	Switzerland	2	2	1	5
5	Australia	1	2	0	3
6	Netherlands	1	0	0	1
7	Japan	0	3	2	5
8	Norway	0	2	0	2
9	Spain	0	1	1	2
10	Austria	0	1	0	1
10	Canada	0	1	0	1
12	Poland	0	0	2	2
13	Finland	0	0	1	1
13	Germany	0	0	1	1
13	Sweden	0	0	1	1
Totals (15 entries)		**16**	**16**	**16**	**48**

==== Slopestyle ====
Year	Gold	Silver	Bronze
2011 La Molina	Enni Rukajärvi (FIN)	Šárka Pančochová (CZE)	Shelly Gotlieb (NZL)
2013 Stoneham-et-Tewkesbury	Spencer O'Brien (CAN)	Sina Candrian (SUI)	Torah Bright (AUS)
2015 Kreischberg	Miyabi Onitsuka (JPN)	Anna Gasser (AUT)	Klaudia Medlová (SVK)
2017 Sierra Nevada	Laurie Blouin (CAN)	Zoi Sadowski-Synnott (NZL)	Miyabi Onitsuka (JPN)
2019 Utah	Zoi Sadowski-Synnott (NZL)	Silje Norendal (NOR)	Jamie Anderson (USA)
2021 Aspen	Zoi Sadowski-Synnott (NZL)	Jamie Anderson (USA)	Tess Coady (AUS)
2023 Bakuriani	Mia Brookes (GBR)	Zoi Sadowski-Synnott (NZL)	Miyabi Onitsuka (JPN)
2025 Engadin	Zoi Sadowski-Synnott (NZL) **(3)**	Kokomo Murase (JPN)	Reira Iwabuchi (JPN)

Medal table

Rank	Nation	Gold	Silver	Bronze	Total
1	New Zealand	3	2	1	6
2	Canada	2	0	0	2
3	Japan	1	1	3	5
4	Finland	1	0	0	1
4	Great Britain	1	0	0	1
6	United States	0	1	1	2
7	Austria	0	1	0	1
7	Czech Republic	0	1	0	1
7	Norway	0	1	0	1
7	Switzerland	0	1	0	1
11	Australia	0	0	2	2
12	Slovakia	0	0	1	1
Totals (12 entries)		**8**	**8**	**8**	**24**

==== Big air ====
Year	Gold	Silver	Bronze
2015 Kreischberg	Elena Könz (SUI)	Merika Enne (FIN)	Sina Candrian (SUI)
2017 Sierra Nevada	Anna Gasser (AUT)	Enni Rukajärvi (FIN)	Silje Norendal (NOR)
2019 Utah	Cancelled		
2021 Aspen	Laurie Blouin (CAN)	Zoi Sadowski-Synnott (NZL)	Miyabi Onitsuka (JPN)
2023 Bakuriani	Anna Gasser (AUT) **(2)**	Miyabi Onitsuka (JPN)	Tess Coady (AUS)
2025 Engadin	Kokomo Murase (JPN)	Reira Iwabuchi (JPN)	Mari Fukada (JPN)

Medal table

Rank	Nation	Gold	Silver	Bronze	Total
1	Austria	2	0	0	2
2	Japan	1	2	2	5
3	Switzerland	1	0	1	2
4	Canada	1	0	0	1
5	Finland	0	2	0	2
6	New Zealand	0	1	0	1
7	Australia	0	0	1	1
7	Norway	0	0	1	1
Totals (8 entries)		**5**	**5**	**5**	**15**

=== Snowboard cross ===
==== Snowboard cross ====
Year	Gold	Silver	Bronze
1997 Innichen	Karine Ruby (FRA)	Manuela Riegler (AUT)	Maria Kirchgasser-Pichler (AUT)
1999 Berchtesgaden	Julie Pomagalski (FRA)	Mariya Tikhvinskaya (RUS)	Olivia Guerry (FRA)
2001 Madonna di Campiglio	Karine Ruby (FRA)	Emmanuelle Duboc (FRA)	Dominique Vallee (CAN)
2003 Kreischberg	Karine Ruby (FRA) (3)	Ursula Fingerlos (AUT)	Victoria Wicky (FRA)
2005 Whistler	Lindsey Jacobellis (USA)	Karine Ruby (FRA)	Maëlle Ricker (CAN)
2007 Arosa	Lindsey Jacobellis (USA)	Sandra Frei (SUI)	Helene Olafsen (NOR)
2009 Gangwon	Helene Olafsen (NOR)	Olivia Nobs (SUI)	Mellie Francon (SUI)
2011 La Molina	Lindsey Jacobellis (USA)	Nelly Moenne Loccoz (FRA)	Dominique Maltais (CAN)
2013 Stoneham-et-Tewkesbury	Maelle Ricker (CAN)	Dominique Maltais (CAN)	Helene Olafsen (NOR)
2015 Kreischberg	Lindsey Jacobellis (USA)	Nelly Moenne Loccoz (FRA)	Michela Moioli (ITA)
2017 Sierra Nevada	Lindsey Jacobellis (USA) **(5)**	Chloé Trespeuch (FRA)	Michela Moioli (ITA)
2019 Utah	Eva Samková (CZE)	Charlotte Bankes (GBR)	Michela Moioli (ITA)
2021 Idre	Charlotte Bankes (GBR)	Michela Moioli (ITA)	Eva Samková (CZE)
2023 Bakuriani	Eva Adamczyková (CZE) (2)	Josie Baff (AUS)	Lindsey Jacobellis (USA)
2025 Engadin	Michela Moioli (ITA)	Charlotte Bankes (GBR)	Julia Pereira de Sousa Mabileau (FRA)

Medal table

Rank	Nation	Gold	Silver	Bronze	Total
1	United States	5	0	1	6
2	France	4	5	3	12
3	Czech Republic	2	0	1	3
4	Great Britain	1	2	0	3
5	Canada	1	1	3	5
5	Italy	1	1	3	5
7	Norway	1	0	2	3
8	Austria	0	2	1	3
8	Switzerland	0	2	1	3
10	Australia	0	1	0	1
10	Russia	0	1	0	1
Totals (11 entries)		**15**	**15**	**15**	**45**

==== Team snowboard cross (discontinued) ====
Year	Gold	Silver	Bronze
2017 Sierra Nevada	Nelly Moenne Loccoz; Chloé Trespeuch; France	Manon Petit; Charlotte Bankes; France	Lindsey Jacobellis; Faye Gulini; United States

Medal table

Rank	Nation	Gold	Silver	Bronze	Total
1	France	1	1	0	2
2	United States	0	0	1	1
Totals (2 entries)		**1**	**1**	**1**	**3**

== Mixed results ==
Numbers in brackets denotes number of victories in corresponding disciplines. Boldface denotes record number of victories.

=== Team snowboard cross ===
Year	Gold	Silver	Bronze
2019 Utah	Mick Dierdorff; Lindsey Jacobellis; United States	Omar Visintin; Michela Moioli; Italy	Paul Berg; Hanna Ihedioha; Germany
2021 Idre	Jarryd Hughes; Belle Brockhoff; Australia	Lorenzo Sommariva; Michela Moioli; Italy	Léo Le Blé Jaques; Julia Pereira de Sousa Mabileau; France
2023 Bakuriani	Huw Nightingale; Charlotte Bankes; Great Britain	Jakob Dusek; Pia Zerkhold; Austria	Merlin Surget; Chloé Trespeuch; France
2025 Engadin	Loan Bozzolo; Julia Pereira de Sousa Mabileau; France	Cameron Bolton; Mia Clift; Australia	Valerio Jud; Sina Siegenthaler; Switzerland

Medal table

Rank	Nation	Gold	Silver	Bronze	Total
1	Australia	1	1	0	2
2	France	1	0	2	3
3	Great Britain	1	0	0	1
3	United States	1	0	0	1
5	Italy	0	2	0	2
6	Austria	0	1	0	1
7	Germany	0	0	1	1
7	Switzerland	0	0	1	1
Totals (8 entries)		**4**	**4**	**4**	**12**

=== Team parallel slalom ===
Year	Gold	Silver	Bronze
2023 Bakuriani	Aaron March; Nadya Ochner; Italy	Andreas Prommegger; Sabine Schöffmann; Austria	Dario Caviezel; Julie Zogg; Switzerland
2025 Engadin	Maurizio Bormolini; Elisa Caffont; Italy	Gabriel Messner; Jasmin Coratti; Italy	Andreas Prommegger; Sabine Payer; Austria

Medal table

Rank	Nation	Gold	Silver	Bronze	Total
1	Italy	2	1	0	3
2	Austria	0	1	1	2
3	Switzerland	0	0	1	1
Totals (3 entries)		**2**	**2**	**2**	**6**

== Medal table ==
Table updated after the 2025 Championships.

Rank	Nation	Gold	Silver	Bronze	Total
1	France	21	23	12	56
2	United States	21	13	26	60
3	Austria	19	25	23	67
4	Switzerland	15	17	16	48
5	Italy	12	10	12	34
6	Canada	11	11	9	31
7	Australia	9	6	5	20
8	Finland	9	5	10	24
9	Japan	8	13	9	30
10	Germany	6	7	12	25
11	Norway	6	5	8	19
12	Russia	6	5	5	16
13	Czech Republic	5	3	1	9
14	China	4	3	1	8
15	Slovenia	3	5	4	12
16	New Zealand	3	3	1	7
17	Great Britain	3	2	0	5
18	Sweden	2	7	6	15
19	Belgium	2	2	1	5
20	(Russia) Russian Ski Federation	2	1	2	5
21	Spain	1	3	1	5
22	Netherlands	1	2	2	5
23	Poland	1	0	4	5
24	South Korea	1	0	1	2
25	Bulgaria	1	0	0	1
26	Ukraine	0	1	0	1
27	Slovakia	0	0	1	1
Totals (27 entries)		172	172	172	516

== Multiple medalists ==
Boldface denotes active snowboarders and highest medal count among all snowboarders (including these who not included in these tables) per type.

=== Men ===
Rank	Snowboarder	Country	Discipline(s)	From	To	Gold	Silver	Bronze	Total
1	**Benjamin Karl**	Austria	Parallel slalom & Parallel giant slalom	2009	2021	**5**	2	1	**8**
2	**Scotty James**	Australia	Halfpipe	2015	2025	4	1	–	5
3	Jasey-Jay Anderson	Canada	Parallel giant slalom & Giant slalom & Parallel slalom	2001	2009	4	–	–	4
4	**Andreas Prommegger**	Austria	Parallel slalom & Parallel giant slalom & Mixed team parallel slalom	2017	2025	3	2	1	6
5	Roope Tonteri	Finland	Big air & Slopestyle	2013	2015	3	1	–	4
6	**Dmitry Loginov**	Russia; Russian Ski Federation	Parallel giant slalom & Parallel slalom	2019	2021	3	–	1	4
7	**Roland Fischnaller**	Italy	Parallel giant slalom & Parallel slalom	2011	2025	2	**3**	**2**	7
8	Seppe Smits	Belgium	Slopestyle & Big air	2009	2017	2	2	1	5
9	Nicolas Huet	France	Parallel slalom & Parallel giant slalom	1999	2005	2	1	**2**	5
10	Antti Autti	Finland	Big air & Halfpipe	2003	2007	2	1	1	4

=== Women ===
Rank	Snowboarder	Country	Discipline(s)	From	To	Gold	Silver	Bronze	Total
1	Karine Ruby	France	Snowboard cross & Giant slalom & Parallel slalom	1996	2005	**6**	**4**	–	**10**
2	**Lindsey Jacobellis**	United States	Snowboard cross & Mixed team snowboard cross & Team snowboard cross	2005	2023	**6**	–	2	8
3	**Zoi Sadowski-Synnott**	New Zealand	Slopestyle & Big air	2017	2025	3	3	–	6
4	**Ester Ledecká**	Czech Republic	Parallel giant slalom & Parallel slalom	2015	2025	3	2	–	5
5	**Cai Xuetong**	China	Halfpipe	2015	2023	3	1	–	4
5	Doriane Vidal	France	Halfpipe	1999	2005	3	1	–	4
7	**Chloe Kim**	United States	Halfpipe	2019	2025	3	–	–	3
8	**Charlotte Bankes**	France; Great Britain	Snowboard cross & Mixed team snowboard cross & Team snowboard cross	2017	2025	2	3	–	5
8	Isabelle Blanc	France	Parallel slalom & Parallel giant slalom & Giant slalom	1999	2003	2	3	–	5
10	**Anna Gasser**	Austria	Big air & Slopestyle	2015	2023	2	1	–	3
10	**Tsubaki Miki**	Japan	Parallel giant slalom & Parallel slalom	2023	2025	2	1	–	3

== See also ==
- FIS Snowboarding World Cup
- Snowboarding at the Winter Olympics
- List of Olympic medalists in snowboarding
- FIS Snowboarding Junior World Championships
