= FIS Snowboarding World Championships 1999 =

International snowboarding competition

The FIS Snowboarding World Championships 1999 took place between January 12 and January 19 in Berchtesgaden, Germany.

== Results ==
=== Men's Results ===
==== Snowboard Cross ====
The Snowboard Cross finals took place on January 17.

Medal	Name	Nation	Qualification Time (Seeding)
1st place, gold medalist(s)	Henrik Jansson	Sweden	
2nd place, silver medalist(s)	Magnus Sterner	Sweden	
3rd place, bronze medalist(s)	Zeke Steggall	Australia	

==== Giant Slalom ====
Giant Slalom finals took place on January 13.

Medal	Name	Nation	Time
1st place, gold medalist(s)	Markus Ebner	Germany	
2nd place, silver medalist(s)	Maxence Idesheim	France	
3rd place, bronze medalist(s)	Stefan Kaltschütz	Austria	

==== Parallel Giant Slalom ====
Parallel Giant Slalom finals took place on January 14.

Medal	Name	Nation	Time
1st place, gold medalist(s)	Richard Rikardsson	Sweden	
2nd place, silver medalist(s)	Stefan Kaltschütz	Austria	
3rd place, bronze medalist(s)	Herald Walder	Austria	

==== Parallel Slalom ====
The Parallel Slalom finals took place on January 15.

Medal	Name	Nation	Time
1st place, gold medalist(s)	Nicolas Huet	France	
2nd place, silver medalist(s)	Mathieu Bozzetto	France	
3rd place, bronze medalist(s)	Werner Ebenbauer	Austria	

==== Halfpipe ====
The finals took place on January 16.

Medal	Name	Nation	Score
1st place, gold medalist(s)	Ricky Bower	United States	
2nd place, silver medalist(s)	Fredrick Sterner	Sweden	
3rd place, bronze medalist(s)	Timo Aho	Finland	

=== Women's Events ===
==== Snowboard Cross ====
The Snowboard Cross finals took place on January 17.

Medal	Name	Nation	Qualification Time (Seeding)
1st place, gold medalist(s)	Julie Pomagalski	France	
2nd place, silver medalist(s)	Maria Tikhvinskaja	Russia	
3rd place, bronze medalist(s)	Olivia Guerry	France	

==== Giant Slalom ====
Giant Slalom finals took place on January 12.

Medal	Name	Nation	Time
1st place, gold medalist(s)	Margherita Parini	Italy	
2nd place, silver medalist(s)	Lidia Trettel	Italy	
3rd place, bronze medalist(s)	Sandra van Ert	United States	

==== Parallel Giant Slalom ====
Parallel Giant Slalom finals took place on January 14.

Medal	Name	Nation	Time
1st place, gold medalist(s)	Isabelle Blanc	France	
2nd place, silver medalist(s)	Rosey Fletcher	United States	
3rd place, bronze medalist(s)	Aasa Windahl	Sweden	

==== Parallel Slalom ====
The Parallel Slalom finals took place on January 15.

Medal	Name	Nation	Time
1st place, gold medalist(s)	Marion Posch	Italy	
2nd place, silver medalist(s)	Isabelle Blanc	France	
3rd place, bronze medalist(s)	Sandra Farmand	Germany	

==== Halfpipe ====
The finals took place on January 16.

Medal	Name	Nation	Score
1st place, gold medalist(s)	Kim Stacey	United States	
2nd place, silver medalist(s)	Doriane Vidal	France	
3rd place, bronze medalist(s)	Anna Hellman	Sweden	

== Medal table ==
Place	Country				Total
1	France	3	4	1	8
2	Sweden	2	2	1	5
3	United States	2	1	1	4
5	Italy	2	1	0	3
6	Austria	1	1	2	4
7	Germany	1	0	1	2
8	Russia	0	1	0	1
9	Finland	0	0	1	1
9	Australia	0	0	1	1
