= Justin Lamoureux =

Canadian snowboarder (born 1976)

Medal record

Men's snowboarding

Representing Canada

World Championships
Silver medal – second place	2005 Whistler	Halfpipe

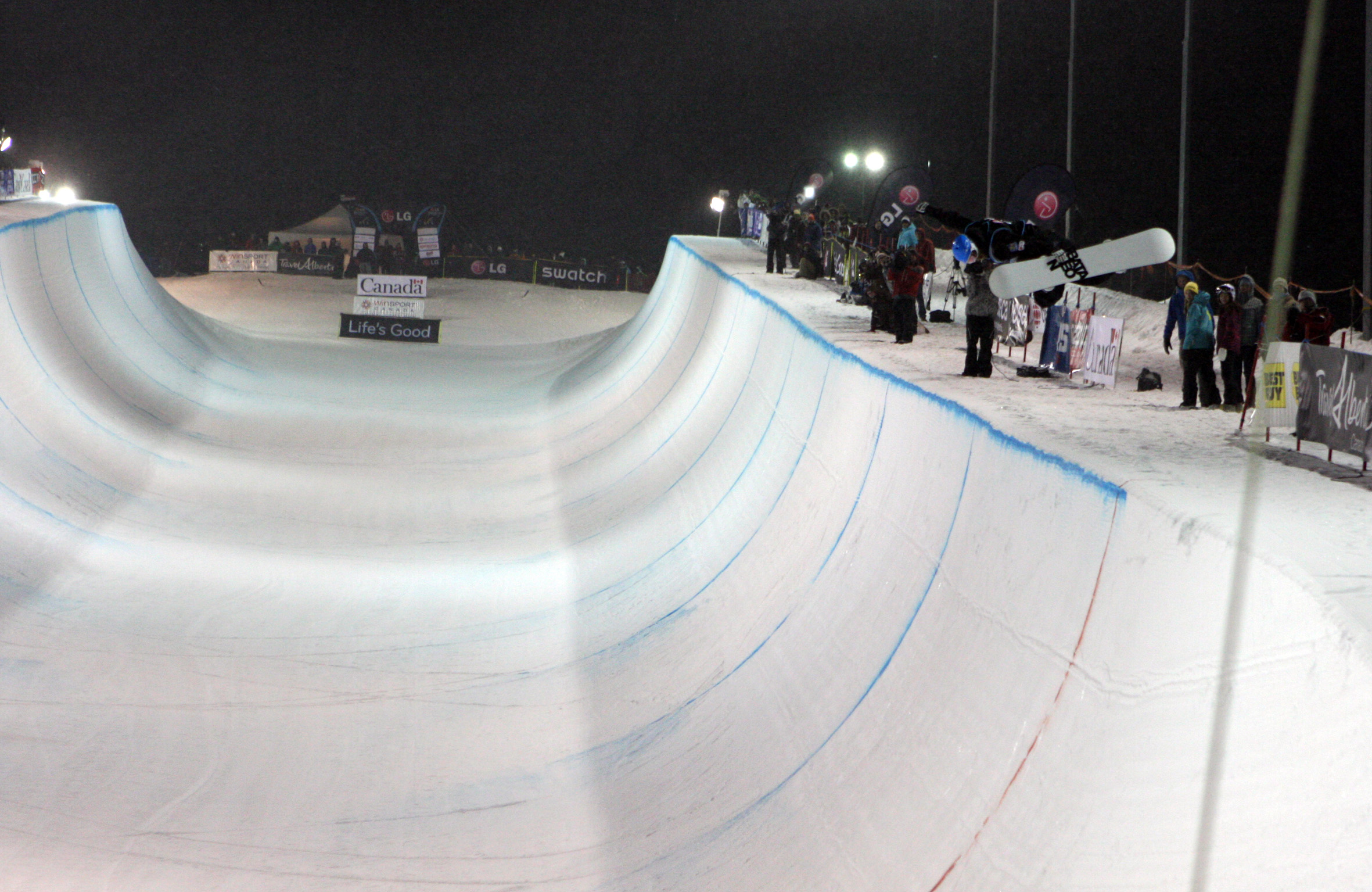

Justin Lamoureux (born August 26, 1976, in Red Bank, New Jersey) is a Canadian snowboarder, specializing in the halfpipe event.

Lamoureux made his World Cup debut in December 1997 at Whistler, Canada. His first, and to date, only, World Cup podium came in December 2002 when he won bronze in Stoneham.

Lamoureux's best World Cup season thus far came in 2010, when he placed 1st overall in the halfpipe standings. He has competed at four FIS Snowboarding World Championships, including winning a silver medal in the halfpipe in 2005.

Lamoureux competed at the 2006 Winter Olympics, the halfpipe. He finished 41st in the first round and 15th in the second, leaving him 21st overall, and not advancing to the final. In 2010, Lamoureaux had laser vision correction with LASIK MD.

Lamoureaux was also selected as a member of the Canadian team for the 2010 Winter Olympics.

== World Cup podiums ==
Date	Location	Rank
December 9, 2001	Stoneham	3rd place, bronze medalist(s)
