= FIS Snowboarding World Championships 1996 =

International snowboarding competition

The FIS Snowboarding World Championships 1996 took place between January 24 and January 28 in Lienz, Austria.

== Results ==
=== Men's results ===
==== Giant Slalom ====
Medal	Name	Nation
1st place, gold medalist(s)	Jeff Greenwood	United States
2nd place, silver medalist(s)	Mike Jacoby	United States
3rd place, bronze medalist(s)	Helmut Pramstaller	Austria

==== Parallel Slalom ====
Medal	Name	Nation
1st place, gold medalist(s)	Ivo Rudiferia	Italy
2nd place, silver medalist(s)	Rainer Krug	Germany
3rd place, bronze medalist(s)	Helmut Pramstaller	Austria

==== Halfpipe ====
Medal	Name	Nation
1st place, gold medalist(s)	Ross Powers	United States
2nd place, silver medalist(s)	Lael Gregory	United States
3rd place, bronze medalist(s)	Rob Kingwill	United States

=== Women's Events ===
==== Giant Slalom ====
Medal	Name	Nation
1st place, gold medalist(s)	Karine Ruby	France
2nd place, silver medalist(s)	Manuela Riegler	Austria
3rd place, bronze medalist(s)	Sondra Van Ert	United States

==== Parallel Slalom ====
Medal	Name	Nation
1st place, gold medalist(s)	Marion Posch	Italy
2nd place, silver medalist(s)	Marcella Boerma	Netherlands
3rd place, bronze medalist(s)	Sondra Van Ert	United States

==== Halfpipe ====
Medal	Name	Nation
1st place, gold medalist(s)	Carolien Van Kilsdonk	Netherlands
2nd place, silver medalist(s)	Annemarie Uliasz	United States
3rd place, bronze medalist(s)	Cammy Potter	United States

== Medal table ==
Place	Country				Total
1	United States	2	3	4	9
2	Italy	2	0	0	2
3	Netherlands	1	1	0	2
4	France	1	0	0	1
5	Austria	0	1	2	3
6	Germany	0	1	0	1
