= Dimi de Jong =

Dutch snowboarder (born 1994)

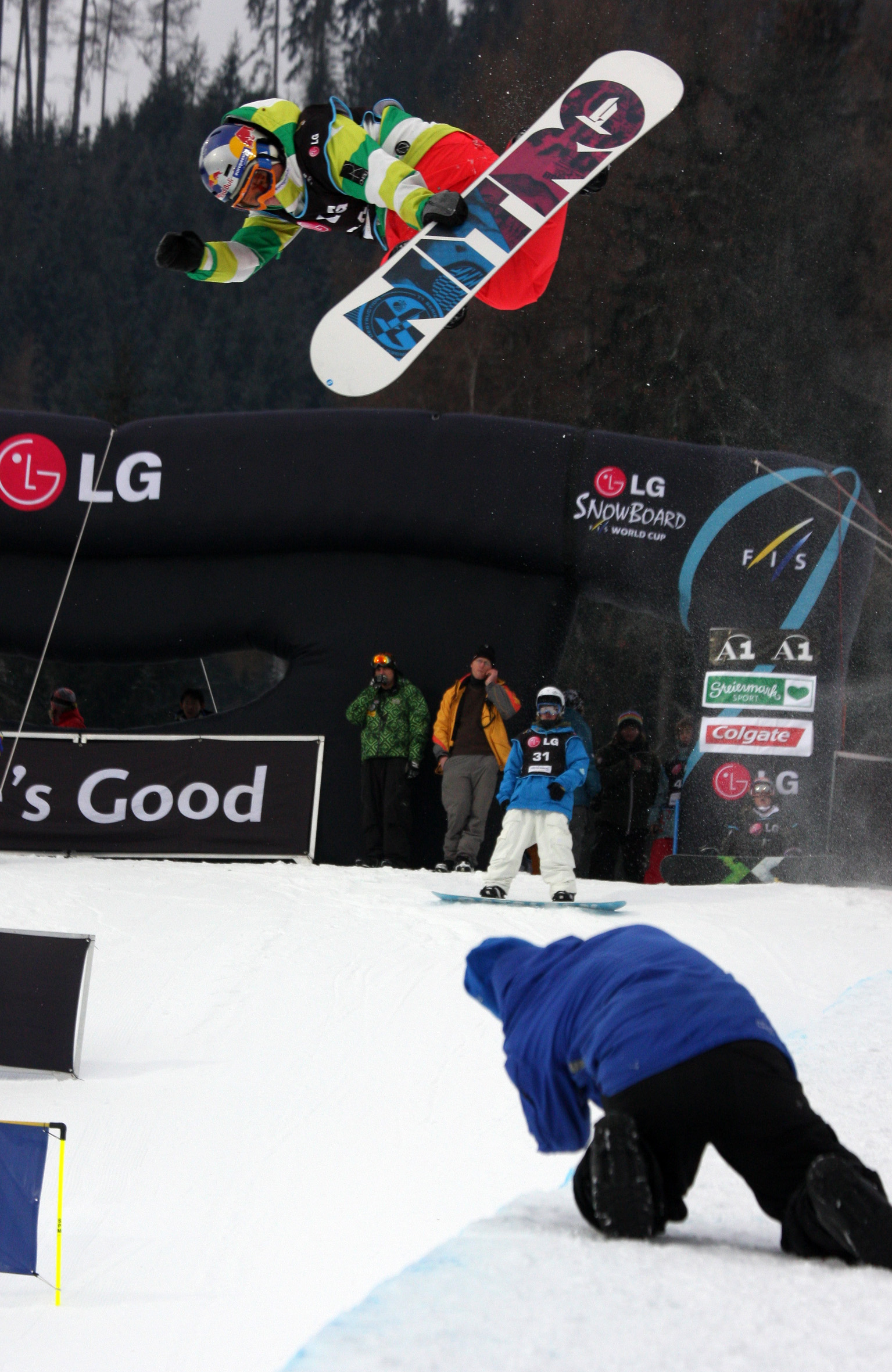

Dimi de Jong (born 1 September 1994, in The Hague) is a Dutch snowboarder. He competed at the 2014 Winter Olympics in Sochi.
