= Kim Christiansen (snowboarder) =

Norwegian snowboarder (born 1976)

Medal record

Men's snowboarding

Representing Norway

World Championships
Gold medal – first place	2001 Madonna di Campiglio	Halfpipe
Bronze medal – third place	2005 Whistler	Halfpipe

Kim Christiansen (born 8 May 1976) is a Norwegian snowboarder. He grew up in Drammen. He started his professional career in 1991 at age 16 when he became sponsored by Quicksilver and he retired from professional snowboarding in 2006. Other sponsors in this period were Deeluxe (1998–2006), Bataleon Snowboards (2003–2006) Arnette (1997–2006) and Elan (1997–2002).

He qualified for the half-pipe competition in the Olympic Winter Games in 1998, 2002 and 2006 where he finished 20, 14 and 41.

In 2001 he won the World Snowboard Championship in Madonna di Campiglio. He also won a World Cup event, at Innichen in 1998.
