= Anton Pogue =

American snowboarder (born 1968)

Medal record

Men's snowboarding

Representing United States

World Championships
Bronze medal – third place	1997 Innichen	Slalom
Bronze medal – third place	2001 Madonna di Campiglio	Parallel GS

Anton Pogue (born 20 June 1968) is an American snowboarder who specialized in slalom and parallel giant slalom. He was born in Sunnyvale, California.

Year	Location	Event	Place
1997 World Snowboard Championships	Innichen, Italy	Slalom	3
2001 World Snowboard Championships	Madonna di Campiglio, Italy	Parallel Giant Slalom	3
