= Zeke Steggall =

Australian snowboarder

Medal record

Representing Australia

Men's Snowboarding

FIS Snowboarding World Championships
Bronze medal – third place	1999 Berchtesgaden	Snowboard Cross

Zeke Steggall (born 9 July 1971) is a former Australian Olympic snowboarder. He competed at the 1998 and 2002 Winter Olympics. His sister Zali Steggall was an alpine skier and Australia's first individual Olympic medalist. Steggall came 28th out of 34 in 1998 and 26th out of 32 in 2002 in the parallel giant slalom.

He has won two World Cup events and a bronze at the World Championships.
