= Drew Neilson =

Canadian snowboarder (born 1974)

Personal information
- Full name: Andrew Neilson
- Born: 15 June 1974 (age 52) Vernon, British Columbia
- Height: 5 ft 10 in (178 cm)
- Weight: 185 lb (84 kg)
- Website: drewneilson.com

Sport
- Country: Canada
Medal record
Men's Snowboarding
Representing Canada
FIS Snowboarding World Championships
Bronze medal – third place	2003 Kreischberg	Snowboard Cross

Andrew "Drew" Neilson (born 15 June 1974 in Vernon, British Columbia) is a Canadian snowboarder who currently resides in North Vancouver, British Columbia. Neilson was a member of the Canadian national snowboard team and competes in snowboard cross.

Neilson was the overall snowboard cross champion in the world cup season of 2006-07. Over the course of his career he has won 9 world cup races and been on the podium 19 times all in the division of snowboard cross. Neilson's best result came at the 2003 FIS World Championships where he finished in the bronze medal position. Neilson went to the 2006 Turin Olympics where he only managed a 17th-place finish. Neilson had gone into those games as the gold medal favourite but was taken out in the early rounds of competition by another boarder. His close friend Seth Wescott went on to win the gold medal at the inaugural Olympic event.

The 2010 Winter Olympics took place in Neilson's home of Vancouver. The location of the snowboard cross for the Olympics was just north of his North Vancouver home. Cypress Mountain was also the site which nearly ended Neilson's career, when he broke his arm biking down the mountain. Neilson finished in 7th place in the World Cup and only snowboard cross competition at the site before the 2010 games.

Neilson is a playable character in the video game Shaun Palmer's Pro Snowboarder.
