= Dagmar Mair unter der Eggen =

Italian snowboarder

Personal information
- Nationality: Italian
- Born: 22 December 1974 (age 51)

Sport
- Country: Italy
- Sport: Snowboarding
Medal record
Women's snowboarding
Representing Italy
World Championships
Gold medal – first place	1997 San Candido	Parallel slalom
Silver medal – second place	1997 San Candido	Slalom
Bronze medal – third place	2001 Madonna di Campiglio	Giant slalom

Dagmar Mair unter der Eggen (Austrian German pronunciation: [ˈdaːɡmar ˈmaɪɐ ˈʊntɐ deːɐ̯ ˈɛɡn̩]; born 22 December 1974) is an Italian snowboarder.

She was born in Bruneck. She competed at the 1998 Winter Olympics, in giant slalom. Her achievements at the World Championships include a gold medal in the parallel slalom in 1997, and a bronze medal in giant slalom in 2001.
