= Margherita Parini =

Italian snowboarder (born 1972)

Personal information
- Born: 1 September 1972 (age 54)

Sport
- Country: Italy
- Sport: Snowboarding
Medal record
Women's snowboarding
Representing Italy
World Championships
Gold medal – first place	1999 Berchtesgaden	Giant slalom
Bronze medal – third place	1997 San Candido	Giant slalom

Margherita Parini (born 1 September 1972) is an Italian snowboarder.

Parini was born in Aosta. She competed at the 1998 Winter Olympics, in giant slalom. Her achievements at the World Championships include a bronze medal in the giant slalom in 1997, and a gold medal in giant slalom in 1999.
