= Lori Glazier =

Canadian snowboarder

Lori Glazier (born September 19, 1971) is a Canadian retired snowboarder, who participated in the halfpipe event at the 1998 Nagano Winter Olympics.
