= Mike Jacoby =

American snowboarder (born 1969)

Mike Jacoby (born May 1969) is an American snowboarder who competed in the 1998 Nagano Winter Olympics.

== Early life ==
Jacoby was born in Bellevue, Washington, but grew up in Idaho Falls, Idaho. He pursued alpine and cross-country skiing until he was 14, when he built his first snowboard and began snowboarding.

== Snowboarding career ==
Jacoby's first event was the 1986 swatch world championships in Breckenridge Co. In the Junior 16 and under category he placed 7th in slalom, 8th in giant slalom, and 5th in Half pipe.

1987 Swatch World championship Mens am auteur Slalom 1st Giant slalom 1st Halfpipe 14th This was the first event the J-tear was done in an event.

The first World Cup tour was 1988

He was the 1991 Overall World Champion (ISF tour) and 1992 Overall World Super-G Champion (ISF tour).

Jacoby won the gold medal in both the 1995 and 1996 World Cup giant slalom. He placed second in the 1996 FIS Snowboarding World Championships giant slalom, and in the 1997 Snowboarding World Championships placed first in the parallel slalom and second in the giant slalom. He placed 17th in the 1998 Winter Olympics.

In 2010 Jacoby was injured while mountain biking, and received a severe head injury.

Sailed singlehanded the Pacific loop.
