= Harald Walder =

Austrian snowboarder

Personal information
- Nationality: Austrian
- Born: 30 August 1973 (age 51); Lienz, Austria

Sport
- Sport: Snowboarding

Harald Walder (born 30 August 1973) is an Austrian former snowboarder. He competed in the men's parallel giant slalom event at the 2006 Winter Olympics.
