= Thedo Remmelink =

Dutch snowboarder

Personal information
- Nationality: Dutch
- Born: 22 April 1963 (age 61); Zelhem, Netherlands

Sport
- Sport: Snowboarding

Thedo Remmelink (born 22 April 1963) is a Dutch snowboarder. He competed in the men's giant slalom event at the 1998 Winter Olympics.
