= Heidi Renoth =

German snowboarder

Medal record

Representing Germany

Women's snowboarding

Olympic Games
Silver medal – second place	1998 Nagano	Giant Slalom

FIS Snowboarding World Championships
Gold medal – first place	1997 Innichen	Slalom
Bronze medal – third place	2003 Kreischberg	Parallel Giant Slalom

Heidi Renoth (born 22 February 1978) is a German snowboarder and Olympic medalist. She received a silver medal at the 1998 Winter Olympics in Nagano.
