= Sondra van Ert =

American snowboarder (born 1964)

Personal information
- Born: 9 March 1964 (age 62) Des Moines, Iowa, U.S.

Sport
- Country: United States
- Sport: Snowboarding
Medal record
Women's snowboarding
Representing United States
World Championships
Gold medal – first place	1997 San Candido	Giant slalom
Bronze medal – third place	1996 Lienz	Parallel slalom
Bronze medal – third place	1996 Lienz	Giant slalom
Bronze medal – third place	1999 Berchtesgaden	Giant slalom

Sondra van Ert (born 9 March 1964) is an American snowboarder.

She was born in Des Moines, Iowa. She competed at the 1998 Winter Olympics in giant slalom earning 12th place, and the 2002 Winter Olympics in parallel giant slalom, earning 17th place. Her achievements at the World Championships include a gold medal in the giant slalom in 1997, and bronze medals in 1996 and 1999.
