= Mathias Behounek =

German snowboarder (born 1975)

Personal information
- Nationality: German
- Born: 25 June 1975 (age 49); Rosenheim, Germany

Sport
- Sport: Snowboarding

Mathias Behounek (born 25 June 1975) is a German snowboarder. He competed in the men's parallel giant slalom event at the 2002 Winter Olympics.
