= Daniela Meuli =

Swiss snowboarder

Medal record

Women's snowboarding

Representing Switzerland

Olympic Games
Gold medal – first place	2006 Turin	Parallel Giant Slalom

Daniela Meuli (born 6 November 1981) is a Swiss snowboarder. Meuli is World Champion 2005 in parallel slalom. In the World Cup in Parallel Giant Slalom, she ranked 1st for 2003/2004, 2004/2005 and the current season (as of 11 February 2006). She also competed at the 2002 Winter Olympics and the 2006 Winter Olympics, winning a gold medal at the latter.
