= Ross Powers =

American snowboarder

Personal information
- Born: February 10, 1979 (age 47) Bennington, Vermont, U.S.
- Home town: Londonderry, Vermont, U.S.
- Height: 5 ft 10 in (178 cm)
- Weight: 179 lb (81 kg)

Sport
- Country: United States
- Sport: Snowboarding
- Event: Halfpipe
Medal record
Men's snowboarding
Representing the United States
Olympic Games
Gold medal – first place	2002 Salt Lake City	Halfpipe
Bronze medal – third place	1998 Nagano	Halfpipe
World Championships
Gold medal – first place	1996 Lienz	Halfpipe
Winter X Games
Silver medal – second place	2011 Aspen	Best method

Ross Powers (born February 10, 1979) is an American world champion halfpipe snowboarder and Olympic gold medalist. Hailing from South Londonderry, Vermont, he is currently the director of the snowboarding program at the Stratton Mountain School in Stratton, Vermont.

== Career ==
Though he originally rode at Stratton Mountain, Vermont, his home mountain is now Okemo, Vermont. Powers helps with the design of the Superpipe and also helped design the RossCross Family Terrain Park. Powers also runs a snowboard camp through Okemo. He led the U.S. sweep in the 2002 Winter Olympics men's halfpipe competition, one day after his 23rd birthday. This is the first time the Americans have swept a Winter Olympic event since the men's figure skaters in 1956. Powers claimed the gold medal with a score of 46.1.

During his final run, Powers dropped in and aired out with an 18-foot method grab (a world record at that time), and followed up with two McTwists, a cab 720 indy grab, a frontside 720 indy grab and a switch frontside air.

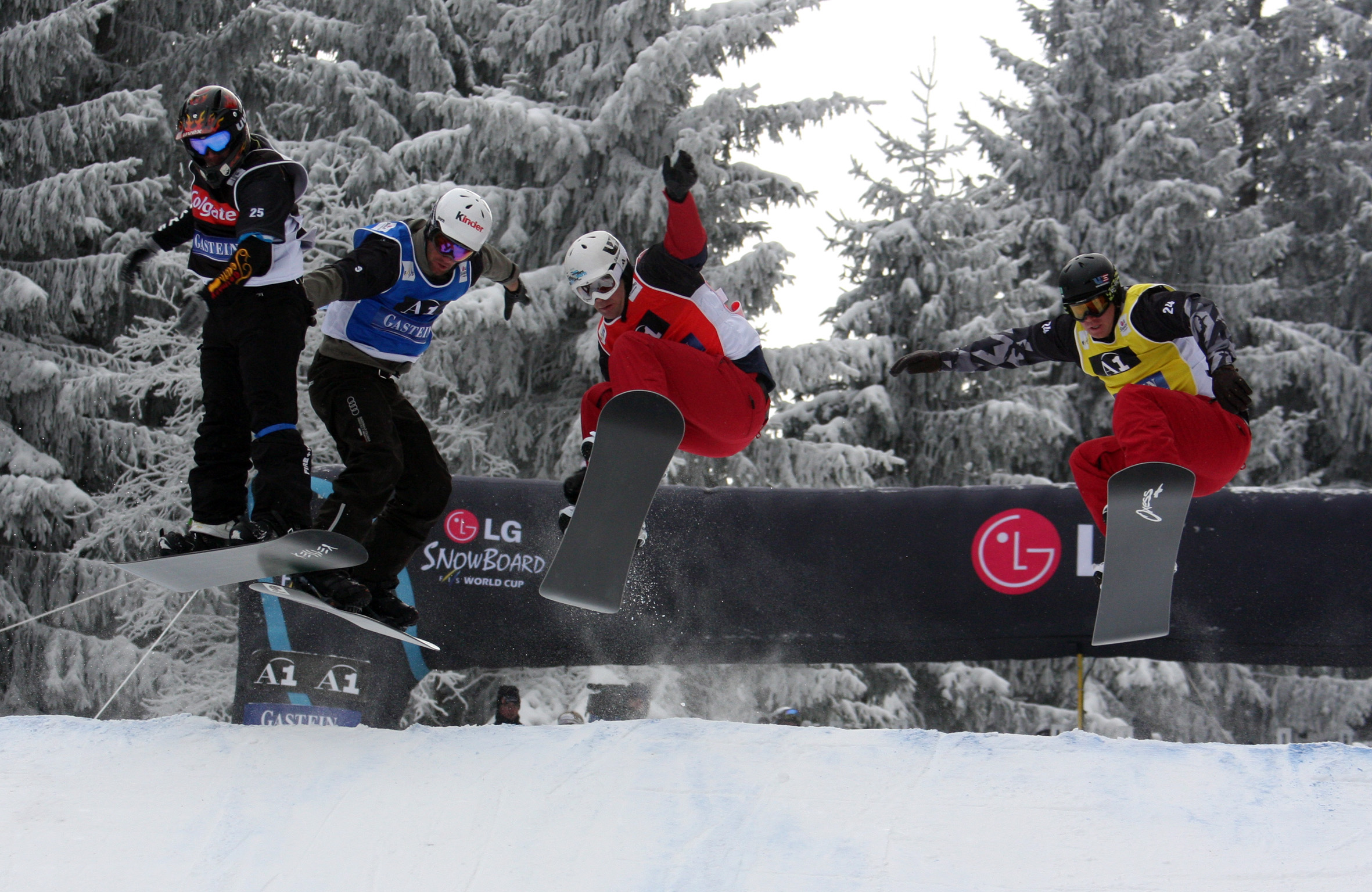
Maximilian Stark, Alberto Schiavon, Nick Baumgartner, Ross Powers

He regularly competes in such events as the US and European Opens of Snowboarding, the Vans Triple Crown (now known simply as the Vans Cup), and the X-Games. During the 2004/2005 season, Ross won the Mt. Bachelor Grand Prix event and went on to be the overall champion for the series.

In 2007 Powers shifted gears and returned to racing in snowboard cross. He had his first world cup podium in that discipline in February 2009 at Sunday River, Maine, and again in December 2009 at Telluride, Colorado.

In 2010 Powers narrowly missed earning a spot on the US Olympic Team for snowboard cross. He finished the season with his SBX World Cup rank at 11th.

In April 2010 Powers was named director of the snowboarding program at The Stratton Mountain School (SMS), in Vermont. Powers is a 1997 graduate of SMS. His current snowboard sponsor is RAMP Sports.

Powers resides in Stratton, Vermont, with his wife Marisa and daughters, Victoria and Meredith.

== Video game appearances ==
Powers is a playable character in the video game Shaun Palmer's Pro Snowboarder. and the video game Cool Boarders 4.

== Philanthropy ==
In 2001 Powers founded the non-profit Ross Powers Foundation, a philanthropic organization that is dedicated to providing financial aid to promising athletes from all economic backgrounds. In 2010, the Foundation provided assistance to a number of up-and-coming snowboarders.

In 2010 The Ross Powers Foundation teamed up with Olympic gold medalist Michael Phelps and formed the Level Field Fund, a non-profit organization with the mission statement: "The Level Field Fund strives to bridge gaps in funding for uniquely talented athletes, following the belief that opportunities to pursue excellence in sport should not be limited by an athlete's financial situation."
