= Bernd Kroschewski =

German snowboarder

Personal information
- Nationality: German
- Born: 24 September 1970 (age 54); Konstanz, Germany

Sport
- Sport: Snowboarding

Bernd Kroschewski (born 24 September 1970) is a German snowboarder. He competed in the men's giant slalom event at the 1998 Winter Olympics.
