= Lidia Trettel =

Italian snowboarder (born 1973)

Medal record

Representing Italy

Women's snowboarding

Olympic Games
Bronze medal – third place	2002 Salt Lake City	Giant Slalom

FIS Snowboarding World Championships
Silver medal – second place	1999 Berchtesgaden	Giant Slalom

Lidia Trettel (born 5 April 1973 in Cavalese) is an Italian snowboarder and Olympic medalist. She received a bronze medal at the 2002 Winter Olympics in Salt Lake City.
