= Manuela Riegler =

Austrian snowboarder (born 1974)

Personal information
- Nationality: Austrian
- Born: 15 June 1974 (age 52) Schwarzach im Pongau, Austria

Sport
- Country: Austria
- Sport: Snowboarding
Medal record
Women's snowboarding
Representing Austria
World Championships
Gold medal – first place	2005 Whistler	Parallel giant slalom
Silver medal – second place	1996 Lienz	Giant slalom
Silver medal – second place	1997 Innichen	Snowboard cross
Bronze medal – third place	2001 Madonna di Campiglio	Parallel giant slalom

Manuela Riegler (born 15 June 1974) is an Austrian snowboarder.

She was born in Schwarzach im Pongau, and is a sister of Claudia Riegler. She competed in women's parallel giant slalom at the 2002 Winter Olympics, and she competed at the 2006 Winter Olympics, in parallel giant slalom.

She won a silver medal in giant slalom at the FIS Snowboarding World Championships 1996, a silver medal in snowboard cross at the FIS Snowboarding World Championships 1997, a bronze medal in parallel giant slalom at the FIS Snowboarding World Championships 2001, and a gold medal in parallel giant slalom at the FIS Snowboarding World Championships 2005.
