= Marion Posch =

Italian snowboarder

Personal information
- Nationality: Italian
- Born: 2 November 1972 (age 53) Vipiteno, Italy

Sport
- Country: Italy
- Sport: Snowboarding
Medal record
Women's snowboarding
Representing Italy
World Championships
Gold medal – first place	1996 Lienz	Parallel slalom
Gold medal – first place	1999 Berchtesgaden	Parallel slalom

Marion Posch (born 2 November 1972) is an Italian snowboarder.

She was born in Vipiteno. She placed sixth in women's giant slalom at the 1998 Winter Olympics. She competed at the 2002 Winter Olympics, in women's parallel giant slalom, and she competed at the 2006 Winter Olympics, in parallel giant slalom.

She won a gold medal in parallel slalom at the FIS Snowboarding World Championships 1996, and a gold medal in parallel slalom at the FIS Snowboarding World Championships 1999.
