= Carolien van Kilsdonk =

Dutch snowboarder

Carolien van Kilsdonk (born 26 July 1963, Amsterdam) is a Dutch snowboarder.

In the 1995/96 season she became World Cup winner in the halfpipe and during the same season she won the world championships on the same discipline.
