= Sandra Farmand =

German snowboarder (born 1969)

Personal information
- Nationality: German
- Born: 13 September 1969 (age 55); Tönisvorst, West Germany

Sport
- Country: Germany
- Sport: Snowboarding

Sandra Farmand (born 13 September 1969) is a German snowboarder. She was born in Tönisvorst in North Rhine-Westphalia. She competed at the 1998 Winter Olympics, in giant slalom and halfpipe.
