= Ursula Fingerlos =

Austrian snowboarder

Personal information
- Nationality: Austrian
- Born: 17 November 1976 (age 48); Salzburg, Austria

Sport
- Country: Austria
- Sport: Snowboarding

Ursula Fingerlos (born 17 November 1976) is an Austrian snowboarder. She was born in Salzburg. She competed at the 1998 Winter Olympics, in women's giant slalom.
