= Dieter Moherndl =

German snowboarder

Personal information
- Nationality: German
- Born: 20 January 1968 (age 57); Trostberg, Germany

Sport
- Sport: Snowboarding

Dieter Moherndl (born 20 January 1968) is a German snowboarder. He competed in the men's giant slalom event at the 1998 Winter Olympics.
