= Richard Richardsson (snowboarder) =

Swedish snowboarder

Medal record

Representing Sweden

Men's snowboarding

Olympic Games
| Silver medal – second place | 2002 Salt Lake City | Giant Slalom |

World championships
| Gold medal – first place | 1999 Berchtesgaden | Parallel Giant Slalom |

Richard Richardsson (born 1 February 1974 in Östersund, Sweden) is a Swedish snowboarder and Olympic medalist. He received a silver medal at the 2002 Winter Olympics in Salt Lake City.
