= Jeff Greenwood =

American snowboarder (born 1975)

Personal information
- Full name: Jeffrey John Greenwood
- Born: May 15, 1975 (age 51) Hartford, Connecticut, U.S.

Sport
- Sport: Snowboarding

Jeffrey John "Jeff" Greenwood (born May 15, 1975) is an American former snowboarder. He competed in the men's parallel giant slalom event at the 2002 Winter Olympics.
