= Stefan Kaltschütz =

Austrian snowboarder

Personal information
- Nationality: Austrian
- Born: 12 January 1978 (age 47); Klagenfurt, Austria

Sport
- Sport: Snowboarding

Stefan Kaltschütz (born 12 January 1978) is an Austrian snowboarder. He competed in the men's parallel giant slalom event at the 2002 Winter Olympics.
