= Maxence Idesheim =

French snowboarder (born 1974)

Personal information
- Nationality: French
- Born: 8 July 1974 (age 50); Quimper, France

Sport
- Sport: Snowboarding

Maxence Idesheim (born 8 July 1974) is a French snowboarder. He competed in the men's giant slalom event at the 1998 Winter Olympics.
