= 1997–98 FIS Snowboard World Cup =

International snowboarding competition

Snowboard World Cup 1997/98
Discipline	Men	Women
Overall	(Austria) Alexander Koller	(France) Karine Ruby
Giant slalom	(France) Nicolas Conte	(France) Karine Ruby
Slalom	(Sweden) Richard Richardsson	(France) Karine Ruby
Snowboard cross	(Austria) Alexander Koller	(Austria) Ursula Fingerlos
Halfpipe	(Sweden) Fredrik Sterner	(France) Doriane Vidal

Competition
Individual	35	35

The 1997/98 FIS Snowboard World Cup was 4th multirace tournament over a season for snowboarding organised by International Ski Federation. The season started on 14 November 1997 and ended on 8 March 1998. This season included five disciplines: parallel slalom, giant slalom, slalom, snowboard cross, and halfpipe.

== Men ==
=== Giant slalom ===
No.	Season	Date	Place	Event	Winner	Second	Third
32	1	14 November 1997	(France) Tignes	GS	(United States) Jeff Greenwood	(France) Nicolas Conte	(Italy) Thomas Prugger
33	2	21 November 1997	(Austria) Zell am See	GS	(Austria) Dieter Happ	(Austria) Martin Freinademetz	(Austria) Dieter Krassnig
34	3	29 November 1997	(Austria) Sölden	GS	(Austria) Martin Freinademetz	(Switzerland) Ueli Kestenholz	(United States) Ian Price
35	4	8 December 1997	(Italy) Sestriere	GS	(France) Nicolas Conte	(Switzerland) Ueli Kestenholz	(Austria) Dieter Happ
36	5	12 December 1997	(Canada) Whistler	GS	(France) Nicolas Conte	(Italy) Thomas Prugger	(Canada) Mark Fawcett
37	6	9 January 1998	(Switzerland) Grächen	GS	(United States) Chris Klug	(France) Mathieu Bozzetto	(France) Christophe Ségura
38	7	13 January 1998	(Austria) Lienz	GS	(Austria) Dieter Krassnig	(United States) Ross Rebagliatti	(United States) Ian Price
39	8	18 January 1998	(Italy) Innichen	GS	(France) Christophe Ségura	(Austria) Peter Pechhacker	(Italy) Willi Trakofler
40	9	27 February 1998	(Germany) Oberstdorf	GS	(Canada) Darren Chalmers	(Netherlands) Thedo Remmelink	(Italy) Karl Frenademez
41 (1)	10 (1)	6 March 1998	(France) Les Gets	PGS	(France) Maxence Idesheim	(Austria) Peter Pechhacker	(Germany) Dieter Moherndl
42	11	12 March 1998	(Sweden) Tandådalen	GS	(Austria) Stefan Kaltschütz	(Austria) Harald Walder	(Italy) Karl Frenademez

=== Slalom ===
No.	Season	Date	Place	Event	Winner	Second	Third
19	1	20 November 1997	(Austria) Zell am See	PSL	(Sweden) Richard Richardsson	(France) Xavier Rolland	(Germany) Bernd Kroschewski
20	2	30 November 1997	(Austria) Sölden	PSL	(Austria) Stefan Kaltschütz	(Slovenia) Dejan Košir	(Sweden) Richard Richardsson
21	3	5 December 1997	(Italy) Sestriere	PSL	(Denmark) Mike Kildevæld	(Germany) Dieter Moherndl	(Italy) Elmar Messner
22	4	10 January 1998	(Switzerland) Grächen	PSL	(Slovenia) Dejan Košir	(France) Mathieu Chiquet	(Germany) Dieter Moherndl
23	5	14 January 1998	(Austria) Lienz	PSL	(Sweden) Stephen Copp	(Austria) Harald Walder	(Slovenia) Dejan Košir
24	6	26 February 1998	(Germany) Oberstdorf	PSL	(Italy) Elmar Messner	(France) Maxence Idesheim	(Italy) Karl Frenademez
25	7	7 March 1998	(France) Les Gets	PSL	(Germany) Mathias Behounek	(Sweden) Richard Richardsson	(Italy) Georg Rabanser
26	8	12 March 1998	(Sweden) Tandådalen	PSL	(Germany) Dieter Moherndl	(Slovenia) Dejan Košir	(Austria) Werner Ebenbauer

=== Halfpipe ===
No.	Season	Date	Place	Event	Winner	Second	Third
22	1	15 November 1997	(France) Tignes	HP	(Norway) Daniel Franck	(Canada) Brett Carpentier	(Finland) Jussi Oksanen
23	2	25 November 1997	(Austria) Hintertux	HP	(Germany) Xaver Hoffmann	(Canada) Brett Carpentier	(Spain) Íker Fernández
24	3	13 December 1997	(Canada) Whistler	HP	(United States) Todd Richards	(Norway) Rune Lunso	(Canada) Alan Clark
25	4	6 January 1998	(Switzerland) St. Moritz	HP	(France) Guillaume Chastagnol	(Spain) Íker Fernández	(Finland) Jussi Oksanen
26	5	7 January 1998	(Switzerland) St. Moritz	HP	(Sweden) Fredrik Sterner	(Switzerland) Gian Simmen	(Sweden) Jacob Söderqvist
27	6	16 January 1998	(Italy) Innichen	HP	(Norway) Kim Christiansen	(Norway) Klas Vangen	(Finland) Aleksi Litovaara
28	7	17 January 1998	(Italy) Innichen	HP	(Norway) Roger Hjelmstadstuen	(Norway) Kim Christiansen	(Sweden) Fredrik Sterner
29	8	4 March 1998	(France) Morzine	HP	(Sweden) Fredrik Sterner	(France) Jonathan Collomb-Patton	(France) Sébastien Vassoney
30	9	4 March 1998	(France) Morzine	HP	(Sweden) Fredrik Sterner	(Norway) Klas Vangen	(France) Sébastien Vassoney
31	10	13 March 1998	(Sweden) Tandådalen	HP	(Sweden) Fredrik Sterner	(Norway) Klas Vangen	(Sweden) Jonas Gunnarsson

=== Snowboard cross ===
No.	Season	Date	Place	Event	Winner	Second	Third
7	1	6 December 1997	(Italy) Sestriere	SBX	(Austria) Alexander Koller	(Sweden) Daniel Biveson	(Canada) Nelsen Jensen
8	2	14 December 1997	(Canada) Whistler	SBX	(Canada) Drew Neilson	(Canada) Shin Campos	(Sweden) Pontus Ståhlkloo
9	3	8 March 1998	(Sweden) Tandådalen	SBX	(Austria) Alexander Koller	(Germany) Mathias Behounek	(Sweden) Jonas Aspman

== Women ==
=== Giant slalom ===
No.	Season	Date	Place	Event	Winner	Second	Third
32	1	14 November 1997	(France) Tignes	GS	(France) Karine Ruby	(Italy) Martina Magenta	(Austria) Manuela Riegler
33	2	21 November 1997	(Austria) Zell am See	GS	(France) Karine Ruby	(Italy) Margherita Parini	(United States) Sondra van Ert
34	3	29 November 1997	(Austria) Sölden	GS	(France) Karine Ruby	(Germany) Heidi Renoth	(United States) Betsy Shaw
35	4	8 December 1997	(Italy) Sestriere	GS	(France) Karine Ruby	(Germany) Heidi Renoth	(Austria) Isabel Zedlacher
36	5	12 December 1997	(Canada) Whistler	GS	(France) Karine Ruby	(United States) Betsy Shaw	(France) Isabelle Blanc
37	6	9 January 1998	(Switzerland) Grächen	GS	(France) Karine Ruby	(Germany) Burgi Heckmair	(Switzerland) Stefanie von Siebenthal
38	7	13 January 1998	(Austria) Lienz	GS	(France) Karine Ruby	(Italy) Lidia Trettel	(Switzerland) Stefanie von Siebenthal
39	8	18 January 1998	(Italy) Innichen	GS	(Italy) Margherita Parini	(Italy) Dagmar Mair unter der Eggen	(France) Isabelle Blanc
40	9	27 February 1998	(Germany) Oberstdorf	GS	(France) Isabelle Blanc	(Italy) Marion Posch	(Austria) Isabel Zedlacher
41 (1)	10 (1)	6 March 1998	(France) Les Gets	PGS	(France) Karine Ruby	(Italy) Lidia Trettel	(France) Nathalie Desmares
42	11	11 March 1998	(Sweden) Tandådalen	GS	(Italy) Lidia Trettel	(France) Karine Ruby	(Austria) Ursula Fingerlos

=== Slalom ===
No.	Season	Date	Place	Event	Winner	Second	Third
19	1	20 November 1997	(Austria) Zell am See	PSL	(Austria) Manuela Riegler	(Austria) Alexandra Krings	(Germany) Heidi Renoth
20	2	30 November 1997	(Austria) Sölden	PSL	(Italy) Dagmar Mair unter der Eggen	(United States) Stacia Hookom	(Austria) Isabel Zedlacher
21	3	5 December 1997	(Italy) Sestriere	PSL	(Italy) Marion Posch	(France) Karine Ruby	(Sweden) Marie Birkl
22	4	10 January 1998	(Switzerland) Grächen	PSL	(France) Karine Ruby	(Austria) Manuela Riegler	(Austria) Alexandra Krings
23	5	14 January 1998	(Austria) Lienz	PSL	(France) Karine Ruby	(Sweden) Marie Birkl	(Italy) Marion Posch
24	6	26 February 1998	(Germany) Oberstdorf	PSL	(Austria) Manuela Riegler	(Italy) Marion Posch	(Germany) Heidi Renoth
25	7	7 March 1998	(France) Les Gets	PSL	(France) Karine Ruby	(Italy) Dagmar Mair unter der Eggen	(Italy) Marion Posch
26	8	12 March 1998	(Sweden) Tandådalen	PSL	(Italy) Marion Posch	(Austria) Manuela Riegler	(Germany) Amalie Kulawik

=== Halfpipe ===
No.	Season	Date	Place	Event	Winner	Second	Third
22	1	15 November 1997	(France) Tignes	HP	(Finland) Satu Järvelä	(Austria) Nicola Pederzolli	(Norway) Stine Brun Kjeldaas
23	2	25 November 1997	(Austria) Hintertux	HP	(Germany) Nicola Thost	(Finland) Minna Hesso	(Austria) Ulrike Hölzl
24	3	13 December 1997	(Canada) Whistler	HP	(United States) Shannon Dunn	(Sweden) Jennie Waara	(Norway) Stine Brun Kjeldaas
25	4	6 January 1998	(Switzerland) St. Moritz	HP	(Germany) Nicola Thost	(Norway) Stine Brun Kjeldaas	(Sweden) Jenny Jonsson
26	5	7 January 1998	(Switzerland) St. Moritz	HP	(Norway) Stine Brun Kjeldaas	(Finland) Minna Hesso	(France) Doriane Vidal
27	6	16 January 1998	(Italy) Innichen	HP	(Sweden) Anna Hellman	(Germany) Sabine Wehr-Hasler	(Canada) Maëlle Ricker
28	7	17 January 1998	(Italy) Innichen	HP	(Japan) Yuri Yoshikawa	(Norway) Christel Thoresen	(France) Doriane Vidal
29	8	4 March 1998	(France) Morzine	HP	(France) Doriane Vidal	(Germany) Sabine Wehr-Hasler	(Germany) Nicole Fischer
30	9	4 March 1998	(France) Morzine	HP	(France) Doriane Vidal	(Germany) Sabine Wehr-Hasler	(Sweden) Anna Hellman
31	10	13 March 1998	(Sweden) Tandådalen	HP	(France) Doriane Vidal	(Sweden) Anna Olofsson	(Sweden) Sophia Bergdahl

=== Snowboard cross ===
No.	Season	Date	Place	Event	Winner	Second	Third
7	1	6 December 1997	(Italy) Sestriere	SBX	(Austria) Manuela Riegler	(Russia) Mariya Tikhvinskaya	(Austria) Ursula Fingerlos
8	2	14 December 1997	(Canada) Whistler	SBX	(Sweden) Jenny Jonsson	(Austria) Ursula Fingerlos	(Canada) Wendy Wyvill
9	3	8 March 1998	(Sweden) Tandådalen	SBX	(Austria) Manuela Riegler	(Austria) Ursula Fingerlos	(Sweden) Sara Fischer

== Standings: Men ==
Overall
Rank	Name	Points
1	(Austria) Alexander Koller	990
2	(Sweden) Richard Richardsson	821
3	(Germany) Dieter Moherndl	758
4	(France) Maxence Idesheim	756
5	(Austria) Harald Walder	726

Giant slalom
Rank	Name	Points
1.	(France) Nicolas Conte	3600
2.	(Austria) Peter Pechhacker	3148
3.	(Austria) Harald Walder	3130
4.	(France) Mathieu Bozzetto	3050
5.	(Netherlands) Thedo Remmelink	3032

Slalom
Rank	Name	Points
1.	(Sweden) Richard Richardsson	3800
2.	(Slovenia) Dejan Košir	3780
3.	(Germany) Dieter Moherndl	3520
4.	(Italy) Elmar Messner	2790
5.	(France) Maxence Idesheim	2760

Halfpipe
Rank	Name	Points
1.	(Sweden) Fredrik Sterner	5480
2.	(Norway) Klas Vangen	4550
3.	(Norway) Kim Christiansen	2300
4.	(Norway) Roger Hjelmstadstuen	2253
5.	(France) Sébastien Vassoney	2131

Snowboardcross
Rank	Name	Points
1.	(Austria) Alexander Koller	2450
2.	(Sweden) Daniel Biveson	1160
3.	(Canada) Drew Neilson	1000
4.	(Sweden) Jonas Aspman	860
5.	(Germany) Mathias Behounek (Canada) Shin Campos	800

== Standings: Women ==
Overall
Rank	Name	Points
1	(France) Karine Ruby	1723
2	(Austria) Manuela Riegler	1450
3	(Austria) Ursula Fingerlos	1030
4	(Italy) Marion Posch	1020
5	(Sweden) Marie Birkl	937

Giant slalom
Rank	Name	Points
1	(France) Karine Ruby	9400
2	(France) Isabelle Blanc	4740
3	(Italy) Lidia Trettel	4610
4	(Germany) Heidi Renoth	3940
5	(Austria) Manuela Riegler	3790

Slalom
Rank	Name	Points
1	(France) Karine Ruby	4700
2	(Italy) Marion Posch	4500
3	(Austria) Manuela Riegler	4420
4	(Italy) Dagmar Mair unter der Eggen	3510
5	(Sweden) Marie Birkl	3200

Halfpipe
Rank	Name	Points
1	(France) Doriane Vidal	4970
2	(Germany) Sabine Wehr-Hasler	4280
3	(Norway) Stine Brun Kjeldaas	3260
4	(Sweden) Anna Hellman	3110
5	(Germany) Nicola Thost	2520

Snowboardcross
Rank	Name	Points
1	(Austria) Ursula Fingerlos	2200
2	(Austria) Manuela Riegler	2140
3	(Netherlands) Nicolien Sauerbreij	1300
3	(Russia) Mariya Tikhvinskaya	1300
5	(Sweden) Marie Birkl	1210

== Podium table by nation ==
Table showing the World Cup podium places (gold–1st place, silver–2nd place, bronze–3rd place) by the countries represented by the athletes.

Rank	Nation	Gold	Silver	Bronze	Total
1	France	20	8	8	36
2	Austria	11	11	11	33
3	Sweden	8	5	11	24
4	Italy	6	9	9	24
5	Germany	5	8	7	20
6	Norway	4	7	2	13
7	United States	4	3	4	11
8	Canada	2	3	5	10
9	Finland	1	2	3	6
10	Slovenia	1	2	1	4
11	Denmark	1	0	0	1
11	Japan	1	0	0	1
13	Switzerland	0	3	2	5
14	Spain	0	1	1	2
15	Netherlands	0	1	0	1
15	Russia	0	1	0	1
Totals (16 entries)		64	64	64	192

== See also ==
- Snowboarding at the 1998 Winter Olympics
