= 1996–97 FIS Snowboard World Cup =

International snowboarding competition

Snowboard World Cup 1996/97
Discipline	Men	Women
Overall	(Austria) Harald Walder	(France) Karine Ruby
Giant slalom	(Austria) Peter Pechhacker	(France) Karine Ruby
Slalom	(Italy) Karl Frenademez	(France) Karine Ruby
Snowboard cross	(Italy) Elmar Messner	(France) Karine Ruby
Halfpipe	(Sweden) Jonas Gunnarsson	(Canada) Tara Teigen

Competition
Individual	37	37

The 1996/97 FIS Snowboard World Cup was 3rd multirace tournament over a season for snowboarding organised by International Ski Federation. The season started on 23 November 1996 and ended on 16 March 1997. This season included five disciplines: parallel slalom, giant slalom, slalom, snowboard cross, and halfpipe.

== Men ==
=== Giant slalom ===
No.	Season	Date	Place	Event	Winner	Second	Third
20	1	29 November 1996	(France) Tignes	GS	(United States) Mike Jacoby	(France) Nicolas Conte	(Austria) Peter Pechhacker
21	2	6 December 1996	(Italy) Sestriere	GS	(Canada) Ross Rebagliati	(United States) Steve Persons	(Germany) Bernd Kroschewski
22	3	13 December 1996	(Canada) Whistler	GS	(United States) Mike Jacoby	(Austria) Peter Pechhacker	(United States) Steve Persons
23	4	18 December 1996	(Canada) Sun Peaks	GS	(Canada) Mark Fawcett	(United States) Rob Berney	(Canada) Jasey-Jay Anderson
24	5	11 January 1997	(Germany) Lenggries	GS	(Austria) Peter Pechhacker	(Austria) Harald Walder	(Austria) Stefan Kaltschütz
25	6	1 February 1997	(Canada) Mont Sainte-Anne	GS	(France) Mathieu Chiquet	(Austria) Harald Walder	(Italy) Thomas Prugger
26	7	7 February 1997	(United States) Mount Bachelor	GS	(Austria) Peter Pechhacker	(Austria) Harald Walder	(Canada) Mark Fawcett
27	8	14 February 1997	(Japan) Yakebitaiyama	GS	(Austria) Dieter Krassnig	(Austria) Peter Pechhacker	(Austria) Dieter Happ
28	9	14 February 1997	(Japan) Yakebitaiyama	GS	(Austria) Dieter Happ	(Austria) Dieter Krassnig	(Austria) Martin Freinademetz
29	10	28 February 1997	(Italy) Olang	GS	(Netherlands) Thedo Remmelink	(France) Charlie Cosnier	(Austria) Peter Pechhacker
30	11	8 March 1997	(Italy) Bardonecchia	GS	(Canada) Mark Fawcett	(Austria) Felix Stadler	(France) Charlie Cosnier
31	12	14 March 1997	(France) Morzine	GS	(Switzerland) Fadri Mosca	(Austria) Peter Pechhacker	(Austria) Stefan Kaltschütz

=== Parallel ===
No.	Season	Date	Place	Event	Winner	Second	Third
14	1	28 November 1996	(France) Tignes	PSL	(Italy) Karl Frenademez	(Italy) Peter Pichler	(Germany) Mathias Behounek
15	2	18 January 1997	(Austria) Kreischberg	PSL	(Slovenia) Dejan Košir	(Austria) Harald Walder	(Austria) Helmut Pramstaller
16	3	20 February 1997	(Japan) Morioka	PSL	(Austria) Harald Walder	(United States) Tom O'Brien	(France) Xavier Rolland
17	4	9 March 1997	(Italy) Bardonecchia	PSL	(France) Maxence Idesheim	(Germany) Mathias Behounek	(Sweden) Richard Richardsson
18	5	15 March 1997	(France) Morzine	PSL	(Austria) Harald Walder	(Sweden) Richard Richardsson	(Italy) Karl Frenademez

=== Slalom ===
No.	Season	Date	Place	Event	Winner	Second	Third
12	1	7 December 1996	(Italy) Sestriere	SL	(Germany) Bernd Kroschewski	(Italy) Karl Frenademez	(France) Maxence Idesheim
13	2	12 January 1997	(Germany) Lenggries	SL	(Sweden) Jakob Bergstedt	(Austria) Stefan Kaltschütz	(Sweden) Ulf Maard
14	3	31 January 1997	(Canada) Mont Sainte-Anne	SL	(United States) Anton Pogue	(Germany) Dieter Moherndl	(Austria) Harald Walder
15	4	1 March 1997	(Italy) Olang	SL	(Italy) Karl Frenademez	(Austria) Helmut Pramstaller	(Austria) Harald Walder
16	5	6 March 1997	(Switzerland) Grächen	SL	(United States) Anton Pogue	(Italy) Karl Frenademez	(France) Xavier Rolland

=== Halfpipe ===
No.	Season	Date	Place	Event	Winner	Second	Third
14	1	14 December 1996	(Canada) Whistler	HP	(Sweden) Jonas Gunnarsson	(United States) Dan Smith	(Sweden) Fredrik Sterner
15	2	15 December 1996	(Canada) Whistler	HP	(Sweden) Jonas Gunnarsson	(Canada) Drae Glover	(Sweden) Daniel Andersson
16	3	19 January 1997	(Austria) Kreischberg	HP	(United States) Dan Smith	(United States) Ross Powers	(Canada) Trevor Andrew
17	4	2 February 1997	(Canada) Mont Sainte-Anne	HP	(Canada) Trevor Andrew	(Japan) Takashi Nishida	(Canada) Michael Michalchuk
18	5	8 February 1997	(United States) Mount Bachelor	HP	(Norway) Daniel Franck	(Canada) Trevor Andrew	(Sweden) Fredrik Sterner
19	6	16 February 1997	(Japan) Kanbayashi	HP	(Austria) Maximilian Plötzeneder	(United States) Ross Powers	(Finland) Markus Hurme
20	7	2 March 1997	(Italy) Olang	HP	(United States) Tom Matthews	(Sweden) Jonas Gunnarsson	(United States) Tommy Czeschin
21	8	16 March 1997	(France) Morzine	HP	(United States) Dan Smith	(United States) Jimi Scott	(Japan) Shinichi Watanabe

=== Snowboard cross ===
No.	Season	Date	Place	Event	Winner	Second	Third
1	1	23 November 1996	(Austria) Zell am See	SBX	(Austria) Helmut Pramstaller	(United States) Steve Persons	(Canada) Darren Chalmers
2	2	17 December 1996	(Canada) Sun Peaks	SBX	(Italy) Elmar Messner	(Canada) Andrew Murphy	(United States) Rob Kingwill
3	3	17 January 1997	(Austria) Kreischberg	SBX	(Italy) Elmar Messner	(Austria) Alexander Koller	(Austria) Helmut Pramstaller
4	4	9 February 1997	(United States) Mount Bachelor	SBX	(Italy) Alex Voyat	(United States) Jason McAlister	(Sweden) Anders Hagman
5	5	19 February 1997	(Japan) Morioka	SBX	(Netherlands) Mark Janbroers	(Sweden) Anders Hagman	(Italy) Elmar Messner
6	6	5 March 1997	(Switzerland) Grächen	SBX	(Italy) Alex Voyat	(Austria) Willi Wieser	(Sweden) Richard Richardsson

== Standings: Men ==
Overall
Rank	Name	Points
1	(Austria) Harald Walder	1091
2	(Austria) Peter Pechhacker	897
3	(United States) Anton Pogue	820
4	(Austria) Stefan Wurzacher	805
5	(Italy) Karl Frenademez	729

Giant slalom
Rank	Name	Points
1.	(Austria) Peter Pechhacker	6020
2.	(Austria) Harald Walder	4420
3.	(Canada) Ross Rebagliati	4280
4.	(Austria) Stefan Wurzacher	4250
5.	(United States) Mike Jacoby	3530

Slalom
Rank	Name	Points
1.	(Italy) Karl Frenademez	5450
2.	(Austria) Harald Walder	5190
3.	(United States) Anton Pogue	4060
4.	(Austria) Stefan Wurzacher	3040
5.	(France) Maxence Idesheim	2988

Halfpipe
Rank	Name	Points
1.	(Sweden) Jonas Gunnarsson	3770
2.	(United States) Dan Smith	3680
3.	(Canada) Trevor Andrew	2980
4.	(United States) Jimi Scott	2870
5.	(Japan) Takashi Nishida	2350

Snowboard
Rank	Name	Points
1.	(Italy) Elmar Messner	2990
2.	(Italy) Alex Voyat	2790
3.	(Sweden) Richard Richardsson	1790
4.	(Austria) Helmut Pramstaller	1600
5.	(United States) Anton Pogue	1560

== Women ==
=== Giant slalom ===
No.	Season	Date	Place	Event	Winner	Second	Third
20	1	29 November 1996	(France) Tignes	GS	(France) Charlotte Bernard	(France) Karine Ruby	(France) Isabelle Blanc
21	2	6 December 1996	(Italy) Sestriere	GS	(Italy) Margherita Parini	(Austria) Birgit Herbert	(United States) Rosey Fletcher
22	3	13 December 1996	(Canada) Whistler	GS	(France) Karine Ruby	(Italy) Lidia Trettel	(Italy) Dagmar Mair unter der Eggen
23	4	18 December 1996	(Canada) Sun Peaks	GS	(Austria) Isabel Zedlacher	(United States) Sondra van Ert	(United States) Rosey Fletcher
24	5	11 January 1997	(Germany) Lenggries	GS	(Italy) Lidia Trettel	(Germany) Heidi Renoth	(France) Karine Ruby
25	6	1 February 1997	(Canada) Mont Sainte-Anne	GS	(Italy) Marion Posch	(Italy) Dagmar Mair unter der Eggen	(United States) Sondra van Ert
26	7	7 February 1997	(United States) Mount Bachelor	GS	(Italy) Margherita Parini	(United States) Sondra van Ert	(France) Karine Ruby
27	8	14 February 1997	(Japan) Yakebitaiyama	GS	(France) Karine Ruby	(Austria) Brigitte Köck	(Austria) Birgit Herbert
28	9	15 February 1997	(Japan) Yakebitaiyama	GS	(Austria) Brigitte Köck	(France) Karine Ruby	(United States) Lisa Kosglow
29	10	28 February 1997	(Italy) Olang	GS	(France) Karine Ruby	(Italy) Margherita Parini	(Austria) Isabel Zedlacher
30	11	8 March 1997	(Italy) Bardonecchia	GS	(United States) Rosey Fletcher	(Italy) Margherita Parini	(Italy) Lidia Trettel
31	12	14 March 1997	(France) Morzine	GS	(Austria) Maria Pichler	(United States) Sondra van Ert	(Italy) Lidia Trettel

=== Parallel ===
No.	Season	Date	Place	Event	Winner	Second	Third
14	1	28 November 1996	(France) Tignes	PSL	(France) Karine Ruby	(Germany) Heidi Renoth	(Austria) Manuela Riegler
15	2	18 January 1997	(Austria) Kreischberg	PSL	(Sweden) Marie Birkl	(Germany) Heidi Renoth	(United States) Stacia Hookom
16	3	20 February 1997	(Japan) Morioka	PSL	(France) Karine Ruby	(France) Dorothée Fournier	(Italy) Marion Posch
17	4	9 March 1997	(Italy) Bardonecchia	PSL	(France) Karine Ruby	(Austria) Isabel Zedlacher	(Italy) Marion Posch
18	5	15 March 1997	(France) Morzine	PSL	(France) Karine Ruby	(Austria) Manuela Riegler	(Austria) Birgit Herbert

=== Slalom ===
No.	Season	Date	Place	Event	Winner	Second	Third
12	1	7 December 1996	(Italy) Sestriere	SL	(France) Dorothée Fournier	(Italy) Dagmar Mair unter der Eggen	(Austria) Alexandra Krings
13	2	12 January 1997	(Germany) Lenggries	SL	(Germany) Heidi Renoth	(Austria) Isabel Zedlacher	(Sweden) Marie Birkl
14	3	31 January 1997	(Canada) Mont Sainte-Anne	SL	(Italy) Marion Posch	(Germany) Heidi Renoth	(France) Karine Ruby
15	4	1 March 1997	(Italy) Olang	SL	(Italy) Marion Posch	(France) Karine Ruby	(Italy) Dagmar Mair unter der Eggen
16	5	6 March 1997	(Switzerland) Grächen	SL	(Austria) Isabel Zedlacher	(France) Karine Ruby	(Germany) Heidi Renoth

=== Halfpipe ===
No.	Season	Date	Place	Event	Winner	Second	Third
14	1	14 December 1996	(Canada) Whistler	HP	(Canada) Natasza Zurek	(Canada) Maëlle Ricker	(Canada) Tara Teigen
15	2	15 December 1996	(Canada) Whistler	HP	(Canada) Tara Teigen	(Canada) Kelly Kaye	(Canada) Natasza Zurek
16	3	19 January 1997	(Austria) Kreischberg	HP	(Germany) Nicola Thost	(Germany) Nicole Fischer	(Canada) Maëlle Ricker
17	4	2 February 1997	(Canada) Mont Sainte-Anne	HP	(United States) Sabrina Sadeghi	(United States) Leslee Olson	(Canada) Maëlle Ricker
18	5	8 February 1997	(United States) Mount Bachelor	HP	(United States) Tricia Byrnes	(United States) Aurelie Sayres	(United States) Leslee Olson
19	6	16 February 1997	(Japan) Kanbayashi	HP	(Norway) Stine Brun Kjeldaas	(Austria) Nicola Pederzolli	(United States) Tricia Byrnes
20	7	2 March 1997	(Italy) Olang	HP	(Norway) Siw Alida Renander	(Italy) Alessandra Pescosta	(United States) Annemarie Uliasz
21	8	16 March 1997	(France) Morzine	HP	(France) Doriane Vidal	(Norway) Siw Alida Renander	(Japan) Kaori Takeyama

=== Snowboard cross ===
No.	Season	Date	Place	Event	Winner	Second	Third
1	1	23 November 1996	(Austria) Zell am See	SBX	(Sweden) Marie Birkl	(France) Karine Ruby	(United States) Lynn Ott
2	2	17 December 1996	(Canada) Sun Peaks	SBX	(United States) Cammy Potter	(France) Karine Ruby	(Austria) Isabel Zedlacher
3	3	17 January 1997	(Austria) Kreischberg	SBX	(Austria) Manuela Riegler	(France) Karine Ruby	(Austria) Isabel Zedlacher
4	4	9 February 1997	(United States) Mount Bachelor	SBX	(France) Karine Ruby	(Canada) Candice Drouin	(Canada) Maëlle Ricker
5	5	19 February 1997	(Japan) Morioka	SBX	(Austria) Manuela Riegler	(United States) Sondra van Ert	(France) Karine Ruby
6	6	5 March 1997	(Switzerland) Grächen	SBX	(United States) Sondra van Ert	(Austria) Claudia Riegler	(Austria) Ursula Fingerlos

== Standings: Women ==
Overall
Rank	Name	Points
1	(France) Karine Ruby	1638
2	(United States) Sondra van Ert	1080
3	(Austria) Manuela Riegler	1006
4	(Germany) Heidi Renoth	977
5	(Austria) Isabel Zedlacher	969

Giant slalom
Rank	Name	Points
1	(France) Karine Ruby	6590
2	(Italy) Margherita Parini	5420
3	(United States) Sondra van Ert	5320
4	(Italy) Lidia Trettel	5300
5	(Austria) Maria Pichler	4000

Slalom
Rank	Name	Points
1	(France) Karine Ruby	6700
2	(Germany) Heidi Renoth	5360
3	(Italy) Marion Posch	4650
4	(Italy) Dagmar Mair unter der Eggen	4110
5	(Austria) Isabel Zedlacher	4040

Snowboard cross
Rank	Name	Points
1	(France) Karine Ruby	4000
2	(Austria) Manuela Riegler	2910
3	(United States) Sondra van Ert	2740
4	(Austria) Isabel Zedlacher	2320
5	(United States) Lynn Ott	2210

Halfpipe
Rank	Name	Points
1	(Canada) Tara Teigen	3350
2	(United States) Sabrina Sadeghi	2620
3	(Canada) Maëlle Ricker	2470
4	(Norway) Siw Alida Renander	2330
5	(Japan) Kaori Takeyama	1970

== Podium table by nation ==
Table showing the World Cup podium places (gold–1st place, silver–2nd place, bronze–3rd place) by the countries represented by the athletes.

Rank	Nation	Gold	Silver	Bronze	Total
1	Austria	14	20	18	52
2	France	13	10	9	32
3	United States	12	15	12	39
4	Italy	12	9	9	30
5	Canada	6	6	10	22
6	Sweden	5	3	8	16
7	Germany	3	7	3	13
8	Norway	3	1	0	4
9	Netherlands	2	0	0	2
10	Slovenia	1	0	0	1
10	Switzerland	1	0	0	1
12	Japan	0	1	2	3
13	Finland	0	0	1	1
Totals (13 entries)		72	72	72	216

== See also ==
- FIS Snowboarding World Championships 1997
