= 1999–2000 FIS Snowboard World Cup =

International snowboarding competition

Snowboard World Cup 1999/00
Discipline	Men	Women
Overall	(France) Mathieu Bozzetto	(Austria) Manuela Riegler
Giant slalom	(Austria) Stefan Kaltschütz	(Italy) Margherita Parini
Parallel giant slalom	(France) Mathieu Bozzetto	(France) Isabelle Blanc
Parallel	(France) Mathieu Bozzetto	(France) Isabelle Blanc
Snowboard cross	(Sweden) Pontus Ståhlkloo	(Germany) Sandra Farmand
Halfpipe	(Sweden) Tomas Johansson	(Germany) Sabine Wehr-Hasler

Competition
Individual	41	41

The 1999/2000 FIS Snowboard World Cup was 6th multirace tournament over a season for snowboarding organised by International Ski Federation. The season started on 27 November 1999 and ended on 18 March 2000. This season included five disciplines: parallel slalom, giant slalom, parallel giant slalom, snowboard cross, and halfpipe.

== Men ==
=== Giant slalom ===
No.	Season	Date	Place	Event	Winner	Second	Third
53	1	27 November 1999	(France) Tignes	GS	(Austria) Stefan Kaltschütz	(Germany) Markus Ebner	(France) Maxence Idesheim
54	2	10 December 1999	(Canada) Whistler	GS	(France) Mathieu Bozzetto	(Austria) Stefan Kaltschütz	(United States) Chris Klug
55	3	18 December 1999	(Canada) Mont-Sainte-Anne	GS	(France) Mathieu Bozzetto	(Canada) Jasey-Jay Anderson	(Italy) Walter Feichter
56	4	19 January 2000	(Switzerland) Gstaad	GS	(Sweden) Stephen Copp	(Austria) Felix Stadler	(France) Mathieu Bozzetto
57	5	5 February 2000	(Austria) Ischgl	GS	(Canada) Mark Fawcett	(Austria) Stefan Kaltschütz	(United States) Chris Klug
58	6	26 February 2000	(Japan) Shiga	GS	(Canada) Jasey-Jay Anderson	(France) Nicolas Huet	(Austria) Stefan Kaltschütz
59	7	5 March 2000	(United States) Park City	GS	(Austria) Dieter Krassnig	(Germany) Markus Ebner	(France) Nicolas Huet
60	8	18 March 2000	(Italy) Livigno	GS	(France) Nicolas Huet	(France) Mathieu Bozzetto	(Austria) Dieter Krassnig

=== Parallel giant slalom ===
No.	Season	Date	Place	Event	Winner	Second	Third
6	1	30 November 1999	(Italy) Sestriere	PGS	(France) Nicolas Huet	(Sweden) Stephen Copp	(Sweden) Richard Richardsson
7	2	4 December 1999	(Austria) Zell am See	PGS	(France) Charlie Cosnier	(Austria) Stefan Kaltschütz	(Canada) Jasey-Jay Anderson
8	3	14 January 2000	(Germany) Berchtesgaden	PGS	(United States) Chris Klug	(Sweden) Stephen Copp	(Austria) Felix Stadler
9	4	26 January 2000	(Sweden) Tandådalen	PGS	(France) Mathieu Bozzetto	(Austria) Felix Stadler	(France) Nicolas Huet
10	5	18 February 2000	(Japan) Sapporo	PGS	(Sweden) Richard Richardsson	(Italy) Elmar Messner	(Canada) Jasey-Jay Anderson

=== Parallel slalom ===
No.	Season	Date	Place	Event	Winner	Second	Third
36	1	9 January 2000	(France) Morzine	PSL	(France) Mathieu Bozzetto	(Austria) Dieter Krassnig	(Sweden) Richard Richardsson
37	2	19 January 2000	(Germany) Berchtesgaden	PSL	(France) Mathieu Bozzetto	(Austria) Felix Stadler	(France) Nicolas Huet
38	3	27 January 2000	(Sweden) Tandådalen	PSL	(France) Mathieu Bozzetto	(France) Nicolas Huet	(United States) Anton Pogue
39	4	4 February 2000	(Austria) Ischgl	PSL	(France) Mathieu Bozzetto	(Austria) Dieter Krassnig	(Austria) Felix Stadler
40	5	10 March 2000	(Italy) Innichen	PSL	(France) Nicolas Huet	(France) Xavier Rolland	(United States) Anton Pogue
41	6	16 March 2000	(Italy) Livigno	PSL	(France) Mathieu Bozzetto	(Sweden) Richard Richardsson	(Slovenia) Dejan Košir

=== Snowboard cross ===
No.	Season	Date	Place	Event	Winner	Second	Third
14	1	3 December 1999	(Austria) Zell am See	SBX	(Finland) Joni Vastamäki	(Sweden) Pontus Ståhlkloo	(France) Romain Borrel
15	2	11 December 1999	(Canada) Whistler	SBX	(France) Sylvain Duclos	(Switzerland) Guillaume Nantermod	(Sweden) Pontus Ståhlkloo
16	3	8 January 2000	(France) Morzine	SBX	(France) Sylvain Duclos	(Sweden) Pontus Ståhlkloo	(Australia) Zeke Steggall
17	4	20 January 2000	(Switzerland) Gstaad	SBX	(Australia) Zeke Steggall	(Austria) Alexander Koller	(France) Thomas Ligonnet
18	5	6 February 2000	(Austria) Ischgl	SBX	(Switzerland) Guillaume Nantermod	(Australia) John Fletcher	(France) Thomas Ligonnet
19	6	9 February 2000	(Italy) Madonna di Campiglio	SBX	(Australia) Zeke Steggall	(Italy) Simone Malusà	(United States) Anton Pogue
20	7	20 February 2000	(Japan) Sapporo	SBX	(Sweden) Pontus Ståhlkloo	(Switzerland) Guillaume Nantermod	(Finland) Joni Vastamäki
21	8	3 March 2000	(United States) Park City	SBX	(Canada) Jasey-Jay Anderson	(Canada) Mathieu Morency	(Sweden) Pontus Ståhlkloo
22	9	12 March 2000	(Italy) Innichen	SBX	(Sweden) Pontus Ståhlkloo	(Australia) Zeke Steggall	(Austria) Alexander Koller
23	10	17 March 2000	(Italy) Livigno	SBX	(Switzerland) Guillaume Nantermod	(France) Mathieu Chiquet	(France) Sebastien Frank

=== Halfpipe ===
No.	Season	Date	Place	Event	Winner	Second	Third
42	1	28 November 1999	(France) Tignes	HP	(United States) Rob Kingwill	(United States) Tommy Czeschin	(France) Sébastien Vassoney
43	2	12 December 1999	(Canada) Whistler	HP	(Sweden) Markus Jonsson	(Sweden) Anders Björk	(United States) Rob Kingwill
44	3	19 December 1999	(Canada) Mont Sainte-Anne	HP	(Sweden) Tomas Johansson	(Finland) Jari Vastamäki	(Finland) Aleksi Litovaara
45	4	15 January 2000	(Germany) Berchtesgaden	HP	(Japan) Kentaro Miyawaki	(United States) Ricky Bower	(Sweden) Magnus Sterner
46	5	22 January 2000	(Switzerland) Grächen	HP	(Sweden) Fredrik Sterner	(Sweden) Magnus Sterner	(Sweden) Tomas Johansson
47	6	28 January 2000	(Sweden) Tandådalen	HP	(Sweden) Tomas Johansson	(Finland) Pasi Voho	(Sweden) Anders Björk
48	7	29 January 2000	(Sweden) Tandådalen	HP	(United States) Tommy Czeschin	(Finland) Tuomo Ojala	(Finland) Pasi Voho
49	8	19 February 2000	(Japan) Sapporo	HP	(Sweden) Fredrik Sterner	(Sweden) Tomas Johansson	(Finland) Pasi Voho
50	9	27 February 2000	(Japan) Shiga	HP	(Sweden) Tomas Johansson	(Sweden) Fredrik Sterner	(Finland) Pasi Voho
51	10	4 March 2000	(United States) Park City	HP	(United States) Tommy Czeschin	(United States) Ross Powers	(Sweden) Magnus Sterner
52	11	11 March 2000	(Italy) Innichen	HP	(Sweden) Markus Jonsson	(Sweden) Magnus Sterner	(Japan) Kentaro Miyawaki
53	12	18 March 2000	(Italy) Livigno	HP	(Sweden) Magnus Sterner	(France) Kevin Saumade	(Finland) Aleksi Litovaara

== Standings: Men ==
Overall
Rank	Name	Points
1	(France) Mathieu Bozzetto	1309
2	(France) Nicolas Huet	1034
3	(Austria) Felix Stadler	891
4	(Austria) Stefan Kaltschütz	811
5	(Austria) Dieter Krassnig	779

Giant slalom
Rank	Name	Points
1	(Austria) Stefan Kaltschütz	4350
2	(France) Mathieu Bozzetto	3836
3	(France) Nicolas Huet	3360
4	(Austria) Felix Stadler	2980
5	(Austria) Dieter Krassnig	2895

Parallel giant slalom
Rank	Name	Points
1	(France) Mathieu Bozzetto	7610
2	(France) Nicolas Huet	5540
3	(Austria) Felix Stadler	4650
4	(Sweden) Richard Richardsson	4610
5	(Sweden) Stephen Copp	4120

Snowboardcross
Rank	Name	Points
1	(Sweden) Pontus Ståhlkloo	5850
2	(Switzerland) Guillaume Nantermod	5230
3	(Australia) Zeke Steggall	5060
4	(Finland) Joni Vastamäki	3660
5	(France) Mathieu Morency	3140

Halfpipe
Rank	Name	Points
1	(Sweden) Tomas Johansson	5770
2	(Sweden) Magnus Sterner	5070
3	(Sweden) Fredrik Sterner	4571
4	(Finland) Pasi Voho	3860
5	(Sweden) Markus Jonsson	3780

== Women ==
=== Giant slalom ===
No.	Season	Date	Place	Event	Winner	Second	Third
53	1	27 November 1999	(France) Tignes	GS	(Italy) Margherita Parini	(Sweden) Åsa Windahl	(France) Karine Ruby
54	2	10 December 1999	(Canada) Whistler	GS	(Sweden) Åsa Windahl	(Austria) Birgit Herbert	(Austria) Manuela Riegler
55	3	18 December 1999	(Canada) Mont-Sainte-Anne	GS	(United States) Rosey Fletcher	(United States) Sondra van Ert	(France) Karine Ruby
56	4	19 January 2000	(Switzerland) Gstaad	GS	(United States) Sondra van Ert	(France) Karine Ruby	(Germany) Sandra Farmand
57	5	5 February 2000	(Austria) Ischgl	GS	(Austria) Manuela Riegler	(Italy) Margherita Parini	(Austria) Isabel Zedlacher
58	6	26 February 2000	(Japan) Shiga	GS	(Italy) Margherita Parini	(France) Isabelle Blanc	(Austria) Manuela Riegler
59	7	5 March 2000	(United States) Park City	GS	(Italy) Margherita Parini	(France) Julie Pomagalski	(Germany) Heidi Renoth
60	8	18 March 2000	(Italy) Livigno	GS	(Sweden) Sara Fischer	(France) Isabelle Blanc	(France) Karine Ruby

=== Parallel giant slalom ===
No.	Season	Date	Place	Event	Winner	Second	Third
6	1	30 November 1999	(Italy) Sestriere	PGS	(France) Isabelle Blanc	(United States) Rosey Fletcher	(United States) Sondra van Ert
7	2	4 December 1999	(Austria) Zell am See	PGS	(Italy) Margherita Parini	(Germany) Sandra Farmand	(Austria) Manuela Riegler
8	3	14 January 2000	(Germany) Berchtesgaden	PGS	(United States) Sondra van Ert	(Austria) Manuela Riegler	(Italy) Marion Posch
9	4	26 January 2000	(Sweden) Tandådalen	PGS	(Austria) Ursula Fingerlos	(France) Isabelle Blanc	(Austria) Manuela Riegler
10	5	18 February 2000	(Japan) Sapporo	PGS	(Austria) Ursula Fingerlos	(Italy) Carmen Ranigler	(Austria) Claudia Riegler

=== Parallel slalom ===
No.	Season	Date	Place	Event	Winner	Second	Third
36	1	9 January 2000	(France) Morzine	PSL	(France) Isabelle Blanc	(Italy) Marion Posch	(Germany) Heidi Renoth
37	2	19 January 2000	(Germany) Berchtesgaden	PSL	(France) Isabelle Blanc	(France) Karine Ruby	(Austria) Nina Schlegel
38	3	27 January 2000	(Sweden) Tandådalen	PSL	(Austria) Manuela Riegler	(United States) Rosey Fletcher	(France) Isabelle Blanc
39	4	4 February 2000	(Austria) Ischgl	PSL	(Austria) Manuela Riegler	(Germany) Sandra Farmand	(France) Karine Ruby
40	5	10 March 2000	(Italy) Innichen	PSL	(United States) Rosey Fletcher	(Sweden) Sara Fischer	(Poland) Jagna Marczułajtis
41	6	16 March 2000	(Italy) Livigno	PSL	(France) Karine Ruby	(Sweden) Sara Fischer	(France) Isabelle Blanc

=== Snowboard cross ===
No.	Season	Date	Place	Event	Winner	Second	Third
14	1	3 December 1999	(Austria) Zell am See	SBX	(France) Marie Laissus	(France) Julie Pomagalski	(Italy) Alessandra Pescosta
15	2	11 December 1999	(Canada) Whistler	SBX	(Canada) Maëlle Ricker	(Germany) Sandra Farmand	(New Zealand) Juliane Bray
16	3	8 January 2000	(France) Morzine	SBX	(Austria) Ursula Fingerlos	(France) Marie Laissus	(Italy) Alessandra Pescosta
17	4	20 January 2000	(Switzerland) Gstaad	SBX	(Italy) Carmen Ranigler	(Austria) Manuela Riegler	(France) Marie Laissus
18	5	6 February 2000	(Austria) Ischgl	SBX	(Austria) Ursula Fingerlos	(France) Julie Pomagalski	(France) Aurélie Tible
19	6	9 February 2000	(Italy) Madonna di Campiglio	SBX	(Germany) Sandra Farmand	(France) Marjorie Rey	(Austria) Manuela Riegler
20	7	20 February 2000	(Japan) Sapporo	SBX	(France) Karine Ruby	(Italy) Carmen Ranigler	(France) Marie Laissus
21	8	3 March 2000	(United States) Park City	SBX	(Germany) Sandra Farmand	(Austria) Manuela Riegler	(Italy) Carmen Ranigler
22	9	12 March 2000	(Italy) Innichen	SBX	(Austria) Claudia Riegler	(Austria) Manuela Riegler	(Italy) Carmen Ranigler
23	10	17 March 2000	(Italy) Livigno	SBX	(France) Karine Ruby	(Germany) Sandra Farmand	(France) Emmanuelle Duboc

=== Halfpipe ===
No.	Season	Date	Place	Event	Winner	Second	Third
42	1	28 November 1999	(France) Tignes	HP	(United States) Tricia Byrnes	(Germany) Sabine Wehr-Hasler	(Sweden) Anna Hellman
43	2	12 December 1999	(Canada) Whistler	HP	(Canada) Maëlle Ricker	(United States) Shannon Dunn	(United States) Kim Stacey
44	3	19 December 1999	(Canada) Mont Sainte-Anne	HP	(Sweden) Anna Hellman	(Japan) Yuri Yoshikawa	(United States) Kim Stacey
45	4	15 January 2000	(Germany) Berchtesgaden	HP	(Germany) Sabine Wehr-Hasler	(Sweden) Anna Olofsson	(Sweden) Anna Hellman
46	5	22 January 2000	(Switzerland) Grächen	HP	(Sweden) Anna Hellman	(Sweden) Anna Olofsson	(Germany) Sabine Wehr-Hasler
47	6	28 January 2000	(Sweden) Tandådalen	HP	(United States) Tricia Byrnes	(Sweden) Anna Olofsson	(Japan) Michiyo Hashimoto
48	7	29 January 2000	(Sweden) Tandådalen	HP	(United States) Tricia Byrnes	(Sweden) Anna Olofsson	(Germany) Sabine Wehr-Hasler
49	8	19 February 2000	(Japan) Sapporo	HP	(Japan) Yoko Miyake	(Germany) Sabine Wehr-Hasler	(Sweden) Anna Hellman
50	9	27 February 2000	(Japan) Shiga	HP	(United States) Tricia Byrnes	(Germany) Sabine Wehr-Hasler	(Sweden) Anna Hellman
51	10	4 March 2000	(United States) Park City	HP	(United States) Tricia Byrnes	(United States) Kim Stacey	(Germany) Sabine Wehr-Hasler
52	11	11 March 2000	(Italy) Innichen	HP	(United States) Kim Stacey	(United States) Tricia Byrnes	(Germany) Sabine Wehr-Hasler
53	12	18 March 2000	(Italy) Livigno	HP	(Germany) Sabine Wehr-Hasler	(Japan) Michiyo Hashimoto	(Sweden) Anna Hellman

== Standings: Women ==
Overall
Rank	Name	Points
1	(Austria) Manuela Riegler	1168
2	(France) Isabelle Blanc	1076
3	(Italy) Margherita Parini	1037
4	(France) Karine Ruby	1002
5	(Germany) Sandra Farmand	939

Giant slalom
Rank	Name	Points
1	(Italy) Margherita Parini	4610
2	(France) Karine Ruby	3600
3	(Austria) Manuela Riegler	3570
4	(Sweden) Åsa Windahl	3450
5	(United States) Sondra van Ert	3106

Parallel giant slalom
Rank	Name	Points
1	(France) Isabelle Blanc	6650
2	(Austria) Manuela Riegler	6160
3	(France) Karine Ruby	4880
4	(United States) Rosey Fletcher	4270
5	(Sweden) Sara Fischer	4030

Snowboardcross
Rank	Name	Points
1	(Germany) Sandra Farmand	5240
2	(Italy) Carmen Ranigler	5220
3	(Austria) Manuela Riegler	4970
4	(France) Marie Laissus	4670
5	(Austria) Ursula Fingerlos	4310

Halfpipe
Rank	Name	Points
1	(Germany) Sabine Wehr-Hasler	7650
2	(United States) Tricia Byrnes	6540
3	(Sweden) Anna Hellman	6470
4	(Sweden) Anna Olofsson	3840
5	(Italy) Alessandra Pescosta	3700

== Podium table by nation ==
Table showing the World Cup podium places (gold–1st place, silver–2nd place, bronze–3rd place) by the countries represented by the athletes.

Rank	Nation	Gold	Silver	Bronze	Total
1	France	21	16	20	57
2	Sweden	16	17	13	46
3	United States	14	9	9	32
4	Austria	10	14	13	37
5	Italy	5	6	6	17
6	Canada	5	2	2	9
7	Germany	4	9	7	20
8	Japan	2	2	2	6
9	Australia	2	2	1	5
10	Switzerland	2	2	0	4
11	Finland	1	3	6	10
12	New Zealand	0	0	1	1
12	Poland	0	0	1	1
12	Slovenia	0	0	1	1
Totals (14 entries)		82	82	82	246
