= 1998–99 FIS Snowboard World Cup =

International snowboarding competition

Snowboard World Cup 1998/99
Discipline	Men	Women
Overall	(France) Mathieu Bozzetto	(Austria) Manuela Riegler
Giant slalom	(Austria) Stefan Kaltschütz	(Italy) Margherita Parini
Slalom	(France) Mathieu Bozzetto	(Italy) Marion Posch
Snowboard cross	(France) Sylvain Duclos	(Austria) Ursula Fingerlos
Halfpipe	(United States) Ross Powers	(United States) Tricia Byrnes

Competition
Individual	35	35

The 1998/99 FIS Snowboard World Cup was the 5th multirace tournament over a season for snowboarding organised by the International Ski Federation. The season started on 13 November 1998 and ended on 14 March 1999. This season included five disciplines: parallel slalom, giant slalom, slalom, snowboard cross, and halfpipe.

== Men ==
=== Giant slalom ===
No.	Season	Date	Place	Event	Winner	Second	Third
43	1	14 November 1998	(Austria) Zell am See	GS	(Austria) Harald Walder	(Austria) Stefan Kaltschütz	(France) Maxence Idesheim
44 (2)	2 (1)	20 November 1998	(Sweden) Tandådalen	PGS	(Canada) Jasey-Jay Anderson	(France) Mathieu Bozzetto	(Sweden) Stephen Copp
45	3	29 November 1998	(Italy) Sestriere	GS	(United States) Jeff Archibald	(France) Nicolas Huet	(Sweden) Richard Richardsson
46 (3)	4 (2)	5 January 1999	(France) Morzine	PGS	(France) Mathieu Bozzetto	(France) Mathieu Chiquet	(Austria) Werner Ebenbauer
47	5	20 January 1999	(Switzerland) Gstaad	GS	(Italy) Elmar Messner	(Austria) Stefan Kaltschütz	(France) Maxence Idesheim
48	6	25 January 1999	(Italy) Madonna di Campiglio	GS	(Canada) Darren Chalmers	(Austria) Stefan Kaltschütz	(United States) Jeff Archibald
49	7	30 January 1999	(Canada) Mont-Sainte-Anne	GS	(France) Charlie Cosnier	(United States) Ian Price	(Canada) Jasey-Jay Anderson
50	8	7 February 1999	(United States) Park City	GS	(Austria) Stefan Kaltschütz	(Canada) Jasey-Jay Anderson	(France) Mathieu Bozzetto
51 (4)	9 (3)	19 February 1999	(Japan) Naeba	PGS	(Austria) Stefan Kaltschütz	(Austria) Felix Stadler	(France) Mathieu Chiquet
52 (5)	10 (4)	11 March 1999	(Italy) Olang	PGS	(France) Mathieu Bozzetto	(Italy) Karl Frenademez	(Sweden) Richard Richardsson

=== Slalom ===
No.	Season	Date	Place	Event	Winner	Second	Third
27	1	13 November 1998	(Austria) Zell am See	PSL	(Austria) Werner Ebenbauer	(France) Mathieu Chiquet	(Sweden) Stephen Copp
28	2	28 November 1998	(Italy) Sestriere	PSL	(France) Nicolas Huet	(Italy) Elmar Messner	(France) Mathieu Chiquet
29	3	4 December 1998	(Austria) Ischgl	PSL	(France) Mathieu Chiquet	(France) Maxence Idesheim	(France) Mathieu Bozzetto
30	4	6 January 1999	(France) Morzine	PSL	(Germany) Markus Ebner	(France) Mathieu Bozzetto	(Sweden) Richard Richardsson
31	5	5 February 1999	(United States) Park City	PSL	(France) Mathieu Bozzetto	(Sweden) Richard Richardsson	(France) Mathieu Chiquet
32	6	14 February 1999	(Japan) Asahikawa	PSL	(France) Mathieu Bozzetto	(France) Nicolas Huet	(Germany) Dieter Moherndl
33	7	20 February 1999	(Japan) Naeba	PSL	(France) Nicolas Huet	(France) Mathieu Bozzetto	(United States) Anton Pogue
34	8	6 March 1999	(Austria) Kreischberg	PSL	(France) Nicolas Huet	(Austria) Harald Walder	(Slovenia) Dejan Košir
35	9	12 March 1999	(Italy) Olang	PSL	(France) Mathieu Bozzetto	(Germany) Mathias Behounek	(Austria) Stefan Kaltschütz

=== Halfpipe ===
No.	Season	Date	Place	Event	Winner	Second	Third
32	1	23 November 1998	(Sweden) Tandådalen	HP	(United States) Ross Powers	(United States) Zach Horwitz	(France) Jonathan Collomb-Patton
33	2	23 November 1998	(Sweden) Tandådalen	HP	(United States) Tommy Czeschin	(Sweden) Fredrik Sterner	(Sweden) Daniel Nordin
34	3	11 December 1998	(Canada) Whistler	HP	(Sweden) Fredrik Sterner	(United States) Ross Powers	(Sweden) Markus Jonsson
35	4	16 December 1998	(United States) Mount Bachelor	HP	(United States) Ross Powers	(United States) Tommy Czeschin	(Canada) Michael Michalchuk
36	5	7 January 1999	(France) Morzine	HP	(France) Sébastien Vassoney	(Sweden) Fredrik Sterner	(France) Jonathan Collomb-Patton
37	6	31 January 1999	(Canada) Mont-Sainte-Anne	HP	(Canada) Guillaume Morisset	(United States) Tommy Czeschin	(Canada) Guy Deschesne
38	7	6 February 1999	(United States) Park City	HP	(United States) Ross Powers	(United States) Tommy Czeschin	(United States) Ricky Bower
39	8	14 February 1999	(Japan) Asahikawa	HP	(United States) Ross Powers	(Japan) Shinichi Watanabe	(United States) Tommy Czeschin
40	9	20 February 1999	(Japan) Naeba	HP	(United States) Ross Powers	(United States) Tommy Czeschin	(Sweden) Fredrik Sterner
41	10	13 March 1999	(Italy) Olang	HP	(United States) Ross Powers	(France) Mathieu Justafre	(United States) Zach Horwitz

=== Snowboard cross ===
No.	Season	Date	Place	Event	Winner	Second	Third
10	1	12 December 1998	(Canada) Whistler	SBX	(Canada) Scott Gaffney	(Canada) Ben Wainwright	(Canada) Mathieu Morency
11	2	22 January 1999	(Switzerland) Grächen	SBX	(Canada) Darren Chalmers	(France) Sylvain Duclos	(United States) Jeff Greenwood
12	3	5 March 1999	(Austria) Kreischberg	SBX	(Australia) Zeke Steggall	(Sweden) Henrik Jansson	(France) Sylvain Duclos
13	4	14 March 1999	(Italy) Olang	SBX	(Sweden) Pontus Ståhlkloo	(Sweden) Magnus Sterner	(Canada) Ben Wainwright

== Standings: Men ==
Overall
Rank	Name	Points
1	(France) Mathieu Bozzetto	1263
2	(Austria) Stefan Kaltschütz	1081
3	(United States) Ross Powers	978
4	(France) Nicolas Huet	932
5	(France) Mathieu Chiquet	872

Giant slalom
Rank	Name	Points
1	(Austria) Stefan Kaltschütz	6600
2	(United States) Jeff Archibald	4460
3	(France) Mathieu Bozzetto	4270
4	(Sweden) Richard Richardsson	3830
5	(France) Maxence Idesheim	3650

Slalom
Rank	Name	Points
1	(France) Mathieu Bozzetto	5850
2	(France) Mathieu Chiquet	4700
3	(France) Nicolas Huet	4640
4	(Austria) Werner Ebenbauer	3250
5	(Sweden) Richard Richardsson	2990

Halfpipe
Rank	Name	Points
1	(United States) Ross Powers	7090
2	(United States) Tommy Czeschin	5660
3	(Sweden) Fredrik Sterner	4960
4	(United States) Zach Horwitz	3970
5	(Sweden) Markus Jonsson	2530

Snowboardcross
Rank	Name	Points
1	(France) Sylvain Duclos	1760
2	(Sweden) Magnus Sterner	1750
3	(Canada) Ben Wainwright	1690
4	(Australia) Zeke Steggall	1640
5	(Sweden) Henrik Jansson	1590

== Women ==
=== Giant slalom ===
No.	Season	Date	Place	Event	Winner	Second	Third
43	1	14 November 1998	(Austria) Zell am See	GS	(Italy) Margherita Parini	(France) Karine Ruby	(Austria) Birgit Herbert
44 (2)	2 (1)	20 November 1998	(Sweden) Tandådalen	PGS	(Italy) Lidia Trettel	(France) Karine Ruby	(Germany) Heidi Renoth
45	3	29 November 1998	(Italy) Sestriere	GS	(Italy) Margherita Parini	(France) Karine Ruby	(France) Isabelle Blanc
46 (3)	4 (2)	5 January 1999	(France) Morzine	PGS	(Austria) Manuela Riegler	(Italy) Carmen Ranigler	(Austria) Isabel Zedlacher
47	5	20 January 1999	(Switzerland) Gstaad	GS	(United States) Sondra van Ert	(Italy) Margherita Parini	(Austria) Claudia Riegler
48	6	25 January 1999	(Italy) Madonna di Campiglio	GS	(France) Karine Ruby	(France) Isabelle Blanc	(United States) Sondra van Ert
49	7	30 January 1999	(Canada) Mont-Sainte-Anne	GS	(United States) Sondra van Ert	(Austria) Claudia Riegler	(Italy) Margherita Parini
50	8	7 February 1999	(United States) Park City	GS	(Italy) Margherita Parini	(France) Karine Ruby	(France) Nathalie Desmares
51 (4)	9 (3)	19 February 1999	(Japan) Naeba	PGS	(Italy) Lidia Trettel	(Italy) Margherita Parini	(France) Karine Ruby
52 (5)	10 (4)	11 March 1999	(Italy) Olang	PGS	(Austria) Claudia Riegler	(France) Isabelle Blanc	(Italy) Margherita Parini

=== Slalom ===
No.	Season	Date	Place	Event	Winner	Second	Third
27	1	13 November 1998	(Austria) Zell am See	PSL	(Austria) Manuela Riegler	(Germany) Heidi Renoth	(Italy) Marion Posch
28	2	28 November 1998	(Italy) Sestriere	PSL	(France) Karine Ruby	(Austria) Manuela Riegler	(France) Isabelle Blanc
29	3	4 December 1998	(Austria) Ischgl	PSL	(France) Karine Ruby	(France) Isabelle Blanc	(Austria) Birgit Herbert
30	4	6 January 1999	(France) Morzine	PSL	(Italy) Marion Posch	(France) Karine Ruby	(Sweden) Sara Fischer
31	5	5 February 1999	(United States) Park City	PSL	(Germany) Sandra Farmand	(Austria) Manuela Riegler	(France) Karine Ruby
32	6	14 February 1999	(Japan) Asahikawa	PSL	(Italy) Marion Posch	(France) Karine Ruby	(Austria) Manuela Riegler
33	7	20 February 1999	(Japan) Naeba	PSL	(Italy) Marion Posch	(Germany) Heidi Renoth	(Austria) Manuela Riegler
34	8	6 March 1999	(Austria) Kreischberg	PSL	(France) Isabelle Blanc	(France) Dorothée Fournier	(Germany) Heidi Renoth
35	9	12 March 1999	(Italy) Olang	PSL	(Italy) Marion Posch	(France) Isabelle Blanc	(France) Karine Ruby

=== Halfpipe ===
No.	Season	Date	Place	Event	Winner	Second	Third
32	1	23 November 1998	(Sweden) Tandådalen	HP	(United States) Michelle Taggart	(United States) Kim Stacey	(France) Doriane Vidal
33	2	23 November 1998	(Sweden) Tandådalen	HP	(France) Doriane Vidal	(Sweden) Anna Hellman	(United States) Tricia Byrnes
34	3	11 December 1998	(Canada) Whistler	HP	(United States) Tricia Byrnes	(France) Doriane Vidal	(United States) Kim Stacey
35	4	16 December 1998	(United States) Mount Bachelor	HP	(United States) Tricia Byrnes	(United States) Shannon Dunn	(France) Doriane Vidal
36	5	7 January 1999	(France) Morzine	HP	(France) Valerie Bourdier	(France) Doriane Vidal	(Germany) Sabine Wehr-Hasler
37	6	31 January 1999	(Canada) Mont-Sainte-Anne	HP	(United States) Kim Stacey	(United States) Tricia Byrnes	(Canada) Lori Glazier
38	7	6 February 1999	(United States) Park City	HP	(United States) Tricia Byrnes	(United States) Kim Stacey	(Germany) Sabine Wehr-Hasler
39	8	14 February 1999	(Japan) Asahikawa	HP	(United States) Tricia Byrnes	(France) Doriane Vidal	(Sweden) Anna Hellman
40	9	20 February 1999	(Japan) Naeba	HP	(United States) Tricia Byrnes	(France) Doriane Vidal	(United States) Kim Stacey
41	10	13 March 1999	(Italy) Olang	HP	(United States) Tricia Byrnes	(France) Valerie Bourdier	(United States) Kim Stacey

=== Snowboard cross ===
No.	Season	Date	Place	Event	Winner	Second	Third
10	1	13 December 1998	(Canada) Whistler	SBX	(Canada) Maëlle Ricker	(Sweden) Sophia Bergdahl	(Austria) Manuela Riegler
11	2	22 January 1999	(Switzerland) Grächen	SBX	(Austria) Ursula Fingerlos	(Austria) Manuela Riegler	(France) Angelique Correze-Hubert
12	3	5 March 1999	(Austria) Kreischberg	SBX	(Sweden) Sophia Bergdahl	(Austria) Manuela Riegler	(Austria) Katrin Winkler
13	4	14 March 1999	(Italy) Olang	SBX	(Austria) Ursula Fingerlos	(Austria) Manuela Riegler	(Sweden) Janet Jonsson

== Standings: Women ==
Overall
Rank	Name	Points
1	(Austria) Manuela Riegler	1479
2	(France) Karine Ruby	1460
3	(Austria) Ursula Fingerlos	1202
4	(Italy) Marion Posch	1043
5	(Italy) Margherita Parini	984

Giant slalom
Rank	Name	Points
1	(Italy) Margherita Parini	7500
2	(France) Karine Ruby	7100
3	(United States) Sondra van Ert	5840
4	(Italy) Lidia Trettel	5120
5	(Austria) Claudia Riegler	4490

Slalom
Rank	Name	Points
1	(Italy) Marion Posch	5500
2	(France) Karine Ruby	5250
3	(Austria) Manuela Riegler	4750
4	(Germany) Sandra Farmand	3620
5	(Germany) Heidi Renoth	3260

Halfpipe
Rank	Name	Points
1	(United States) Tricia Byrnes	7400
2	(France) Doriane Vidal	5900
3	(United States) Kim Stacey	5400
4	(Germany) Sabine Wehr-Hasler	3860
5	(Sweden) Anna Hellman	3800

Snowboardcross
Rank	Name	Points
1	(Austria) Ursula Fingerlos	2450
2	(Austria) Manuela Riegler	2400
3	(Sweden) Sophia Bergdahl	2200
4	(Canada) Maëlle Ricker	1450
5	(United Kingdom) Lesley McKenna	1170

== Podium table by nation ==
Table showing the World Cup podium places (gold–1st place, silver–2nd place, bronze–3rd place) by the countries represented by the athletes.

Rank	Nation	Gold	Silver	Bronze	Total
1	United States	18	11	11	40
2	France	17	26	19	62
3	Italy	10	5	3	18
4	Austria	9	11	10	30
5	Canada	6	2	6	14
6	Sweden	3	7	11	21
7	Germany	2	3	5	10
8	Australia	1	0	0	1
9	Japan	0	1	0	1
10	Slovenia	0	0	1	1
Totals (10 entries)		66	66	66	198

== See also ==
- FIS Snowboarding World Championships 1999
