= Snowboarding at the 1998 Winter Olympics – Men's giant slalom =

Men's Giant Slalom at the XVIII Olympic Winter Games
- Venue: Mount Yakebitai
- Date: 8 February 1998
- Competitors: 34 from 14 nations
- Winning time: 2:03.96

Medalists
1st place, gold medalist(s)		Ross Rebagliati	Canada
2nd place, silver medalist(s)		Thomas Prugger	Italy
3rd place, bronze medalist(s)		Ueli Kestenholz	Switzerland

The Men's giant slalom competition of the Nagano 1998 Olympics was held at Mount Yakebitai on 8 February 1998.

It was the first time snowboarding was added as a sport at the Winter Olympic Games. The giant slalom was replaced by the parallel giant slalom event in 2002 in Salt Lake City.

== Medalists ==
Gold	Ross Rebagliati; Canada
Silver	Thomas Prugger; Italy
Bronze	Ueli Kestenholz; Switzerland

== Results ==
The competitors were allowed two runs on a giant slalom course. The two times were then added to determine the winners.

Rank	Bib	Name	Nationality	Run 1	Rank	Run 2	Rank	Total	Difference
1st place, gold medalist(s)	3	Ross Rebagliati	Canada	0:59.87	8	1:04.09	2	2:03.96	-
2nd place, silver medalist(s)	2	Thomas Prugger	Italy	0:59.38	2	1:04.60	5	2:03.98	+0.02
3rd place, bronze medalist(s)	6	Ueli Kestenholz	Switzerland	1:00.20	10	1:03.88	1	2:04.08	+0.12
4	12	Dieter Krassnig	Austria	1:00.11	9	1:04.22	3	2:04.33	+0.37
5	11	Mathieu Bozzetto	France	0:59.83	7	1:04.74	6	2:04.57	+0.61
6	5	Chris Klug	United States	0:59.38	2	1:05.87	10	2:05.25	+1.29
7	7	Martin Freinademetz	Austria	0:59.58	4	1:05.76	9	2:05.34	+1.38
8	19	Maxence Idesheim	France	1:00.75	12	1:04.77	7	2:05.52	+1.56
9	13	Dieter Happ	Austria	1:02.65	16	1:04.40	4	2:07.05	+3.09
10	10	Thedo Remmelink	Netherlands	1:02.01	15	1:05.24	8	2:07.25	+3.29
11	21	Willi Trakofler	Italy	1:01.42	13	1:05.88	11	2:07.30	+3.34
12	1	Christophe Ségura	France	0:59.59	5	1:09.27	18	2:08.86	+4.90
13	24	Elmar Messner	Italy	1:01.42	13	1:07.99	15	2:09.41	+5.45
14	27	Dieter Moherndl	Germany	1:03.03	19	1:07.00	12	2:10.03	+6.07
15	23	Mike Kildevæld	Denmark	1:02.75	17	1:07.67	13	2:10.42	+6.46
16	9	Jasey-Jay Anderson	Canada	0:59.31	1	1:12.02	19	2:11.33	+7.37
17	15	Mike Jacoby	United States	1:03.53	22	1:08.27	16	2:11.80	+7.84
18	20	Stephen Copp	Sweden	1:04.14	25	1:07.75	14	2:11.89	+7.93
19	28	Łukasz Starowicz	Poland	1:03.50	21	1:08.81	17	2:12.31	+8.35
20	29	Karl Frenademez	Italy	1:03.33	20	1:12.62	20	2:15.95	+11.99
21	33	Mariano López	Argentina	1:12.20	28	1:19.11	21	2:31.31	+27.35
-	4	Nicolas Conte	France	0:59.69	6	DNF	-	-	-
-	25	Richard Richardsson	Sweden	1:02.93	18	DNF	-	-	-
-	32	Markos Khatzikyriakakis	Greece	1:06.40	26	DNF	-	-	-
-	16	Sigi Grabner	Austria	1:00.61	11	DSQ	-	-	-
-	22	Bernd Kroschewski	Germany	1:03.53	23	DSQ	-	-	-
-	18	Darren Chalmers	Canada	1:04.09	24	DSQ	-	-	-
-	30	Zeke Steggall	Australia	1:08.10	27	DSQ	-	-	-
-	14	Mark Fawcett	Canada	DNF	-	-	-	-	-
-	34	Stergios Pappos	Greece	DNF	-	-	-	-	-
-	8	Fadri Mosca	Switzerland	DSQ	-	-	-	-	-
-	17	Gilles Jaquet	Switzerland	DSQ	-	-	-	-	-
-	26	André Grütter	Switzerland	DSQ	-	-	-	-	-
-	31	Adam Hostetter	United States	DSQ	-	-	-	-	-

DNF - Did not finish; DSQ - Disqualified
