= 1994–95 FIS Snowboard World Cup =

International snowboarding competition

Snowboard World Cup 1994/95
Discipline	Men	Women
Overall	not awarded	not awarded
Giant slalom	(United States) Mike Jacoby	(France) Karine Ruby
Slalom	(Italy) Peter Pichler	(Netherlands) Marcella Boerma
Parallel	(United States) Mike Jacoby	(Italy) Marion Posch
Halfpipe	(United States) Lael Gregory	(United States) Sabrina Sadeghi

Competition
Locations	9	9
Individual	23	23
Cancelled	1	1

The 1994/95 FIS Snowboard World Cup was 1st multi race tournament over a season for snowboarding organised by International Ski Federation. The season started on 11 November 1994 and ended on 1 April 1995. This season included four disciplines: parallel slalom, giant slalom, slalom and halfpipe.

== Men ==
=== Giant slalom ===
No.	Season	Date	Place	Event	Winner	Second	Third
1	1	26 November 1994	(Austria) Zell am See/Kaprun	GS	(Netherlands) Thedo Remmelink	(Austria) Heimo Bär	(United States) Mike Jacoby
2	2	5 December 1994	(Austria) Pitztal	GS	(Austria) Peter Pechhacker	(Netherlands) Thedo Remmelink	(France) Damien Vigroux
3	3	13 January 1995	(France) Les Deux Alpes	GS	(United States) Mike Jacoby	(Austria) Peter Pechhacker	(Austria) Harald Walder
		20 January 1995	(Italy) San Candido	GS	cancelled		
4	4	29 January 1995	(Germany) Bad Hindelang-Oberjoch	GS	(Austria) Rupert Wallinger	(Austria) Peter Pechhacker	(Austria) Harald Walder
5	5	2 February 1995	(Japan) Alts	GS	(United States) Steve Persons	(Denmark) Mike Kildevæld	(Netherlands) Thedo Remmelink
6	6	8 February 1995	(United States) Mount Bachelor	GS	(Denmark) Mike Kildevæld	(United States) Steve Persons	(United States) Mike Jacoby
7	6	14 February 1995	(United States) Breckenridge	GS	(United States) Steve Persons	(Austria) Peter Pechhacker	(United States) Mike Jacoby
8	8	23 February 1995	(Canada) Calgary	GS	(United States) Mike Jacoby	(France) Damien Vigroux	(Netherlands) Thedo Remmelink

=== Slalom ===
No.	Season	Date	Place	Event	Winner	Second	Third
1	1	6 December 1994	(Austria) Pitztal	SL	(Germany) Bernd Kroschewski	(United States) Mike Jacoby	(Germany) Rainer Krug
2	2	22 January 1995	(Italy) San Candido	SL	(Netherlands) Thedo Remmelink	(Italy) Elmar Messner	(Italy) Peter Pichler
3	3	9 February 1995	(United States) Mount Bachelor	SL	(Denmark) Mike Kildevæld	(Germany) Rainer Krug	(Austria) Stefan Kaltschütz
4	4	15 February 1995	(United States) Breckenridge	SL	(Italy) Ivo Rudiferia	(United States) Steve Persons	(Italy) Peter Pichler
5	5	24 February 1995	(Canada) Calgary	SL	(United States) Steve Persons	(Netherlands) Thedo Remmelink	(Italy) Peter Pichler

=== Parallel ===
No.	Season	Date	Place	Event	Winner	Second	Third
1	1	24 November 1994	(Austria) Zell am See/Kaprun	PSL	(Germany) Mathias Behounek	(Germany) Rainer Krug	(United States) Mike Jacoby
2	2	14 January 1995	(France) Les Deux Alpes	PSL	(France) Damien Vigroux	(Italy) Ivo Rudiferia	(Italy) Thomas Prugger
3	3	21 January 1995	(Italy) San Candido	PSL	(Germany) Bernd Kroschewski	(Netherlands) Thedo Remmelink	(Italy) Ivo Rudiferia
4	4	28 January 1995	(Germany) Bad Hindelang-Oberjoch	PSL	(United States) Steve Persons	(Denmark) Mike Kildevæld	(Netherlands) Thedo Remmelink
5	5	25 February 1995	(Canada) Calgary	PSL	(Canada) Brad Zapisocki	(Austria) Stefan Kaltschütz	(United States) Mike Jacoby

=== Halpipe ===
No.	Season	Date	Place	Event	Winner	Second	Third
1	1	20 January 1995	(Italy) San Candido	HP	(United States) Lael Gregory	(Switzerland) Ivan Zeller	(United States) Ross Powers
2	2	3 February 1995	(Japan) Alts	HP	(United States) Ross Powers	(United States) Lael Gregory	(Canada) Brian Savard
3	3	10 February 1995	(United States) Mount Bachelor	HP	(United States) Lael Gregory	(United States) Ross Powers	(Switzerland) Ivan Zeller
4	4	16 February 1995	(United States) Breckenridge	HP	(United States) Lael Gregory	(United States) Ross Powers	(Switzerland) Ivan Zeller
5	5	26 February 1995	(Canada) Calgary	HP	(United States) Lael Gregory	(United States) Ross Powers	(United States) Bjorn Leines

== Ladies ==
=== Giant slalom ===
No.	Season	Date	Place	Event	Winner	Second	Third
1	1	26 November 1994	(Austria) Zell am See/Kaprun	GS	(Germany) Amalie Kulawik	(Germany) Heidi Renoth	(Austria) Isabel Zedlacher
2	2	5 December 1994	(Austria) Pitztal	GS	(France) Karine Ruby	(Netherlands) Marcella Boerma	(United States) Sondra van Ert
3	3	13 January 1995	(France) Les Deux Alpes	GS	(France) Karine Ruby	(Austria) Birgit Herbert	(United States) Stacia Hookom
		20 January 1995	(Italy) San Candido	GS	cancelled		
4	4	29 January 1995	(Germany) Bad Hindelang-Oberjoch	GS	(France) Karine Ruby	(United States) Stacia Hookom	(Germany) Amalie Kulawik
5	5	2 February 1995	(Japan) Alts	GS	(Austria) Birgit Herbert	(Italy) Marion Posch	(United States) Stacia Hookom
6	6	8 February 1995	(United States) Mount Bachelor	GS	(Austria) Birgit Herbert	(France) Karine Ruby	(United States) Sondra van Ert
7	6	14 February 1995	(United States) Breckenridge	GS	(France) Karine Ruby	(Austria) Alexandra Krings	(Germany) Heidi Renoth
8	8	23 February 1995	(Canada) Calgary	GS	(France) Karine Ruby	(Austria) Alexandra Krings	(Italy) Marion Posch

=== Slalom ===
No.	Season	Date	Place	Event	Winner	Second	Third
1	1	6 December 1994	(Austria) Pitztal	SL	(Germany) Heidi Renoth	(Netherlands) Marcella Boerma	(Austria) Alexandra Krings
2	2	22 January 1995	(Italy) San Candido	SL	(Netherlands) Marcella Boerma	(Germany) Steffi Prentl	(France) Karine Ruby
3	3	9 February 1995	(United States) Mount Bachelor	SL	(France) Karine Ruby	(Austria) Alexandra Krings	(Germany) Heidi Renoth
4	4	15 February 1995	(United States) Breckenridge	SL	(Netherlands) Marcella Boerma	(Germany) Heidi Renoth	(United States) Sondra van Ert
5	5	24 February 1995	(Canada) Calgary	SL	(Germany) Amalie Kulawik	(France) Karine Ruby	(United States) Stacia Hookom

=== Parallel ===
No.	Season	Date	Place	Event	Winner	Second	Third
1	1	24 November 1994	(Austria) Zell am See/Kaprun	PSL	(France) Karine Ruby	(Netherlands) Marcella Boerma	(Germany) Amalie Kulawik
2	2	14 January 1995	(France) Les Deux Alpes	PSL	(Germany) Steffi Prentl	(Austria) Manuela Riegler	(Italy) Marion Posch
3	3	21 January 1995	(Italy) San Candido	PSL	(Italy) Marion Posch	(France) Karine Ruby	(Germany) Heidi Renoth
4	4	28 January 1995	(Germany) Bad Hindelang-Oberjoch	PSL	(Germany) Heidi Renoth	(Italy) Marion Posch	(Netherlands) Marcella Boerma
5	5	25 February 1995	(Canada) Calgary	PSL	(Italy) Marion Posch	(Germany) Heidi Renoth	(United States) Stacia Hookom

=== Halpipe ===
No.	Season	Date	Place	Event	Winner	Second	Third
1	1	20 January 1995	(Italy) San Candido	HP	(United States) Sabrina Sadeghi	(United States) Cammy Potter	(United States) Annemarie Uliasz
2	2	3 February 1995	(Japan) Alts	HP	(United States) Sabrina Sadeghi	(Japan) Kaori Takeyama	(United States) Annemarie Uliasz
3	3	10 February 1995	(United States) Mount Bachelor	HP	(United States) Sabrina Sadeghi	(United States) Cammy Potter	(United States) Annemarie Uliasz
4	4	16 February 1995	(United States) Breckenridge	HP	(United States) Sabrina Sadeghi	(United States) Annemarie Uliasz	(United States) Cammy Potter
5	5	26 February 1995	(Canada) Calgary	HP	(United States) Sabrina Sadeghi	(United States) Annemarie Uliasz	(United States) Cammy Potter

== Standings: Men ==
=== Giant slalom ===
Rank		Points
1	(United States) Mike Jacoby	4811
2	(Austria) Peter Pechhacker	4590
3	(Netherlands) Thedo Remmelink	4210
4	(United States) Steve Persons	3956
5	(France) Damien Vigroux	3310

- Standings after 8 races.

=== Slalom ===
Rank		Points
1	(Italy) Peter Pichler	2610
2	(Netherlands) Thedo Remmelink	2490
3	(Germany) Rainer Krug	2420
4	(United States) Steve Persons	2410
5	(United States) Mike Jacoby	2210

- Standings after 5 races.

=== Parallel ===
Rank		Points
1	(United States) Mike Jacoby	2690
2	(Germany) Mathias Behounek	2520
3	(Germany) Rainer Krug	2300
4	(Netherlands) Thedo Remmelink	2126
5	(Germany) Bernd Kroschewski	2020

- Standings after 5 races.

=== Halfpipe ===
Rank		Points
1	(United States) Lael Gregory	4800
2	(United States) Ross Powers	4000
3	(Switzerland) Ivan Zeller	2800
4	(United States) Dustin del Gudice	1810
5	(United States) Mike Jacoby	1602

- Standings after 5 races.

== Standings: Ladies ==
=== Giant slalom ===
Rank		Points
1	(France) Karine Ruby	6480
2	(Germany) Amalie Kulawik	3990
3	(Austria) Alexandra Krings	3710
4	(Austria) Birgit Herbert	3680
5	(United States) Stacia Hookom	3550

- Standings after 8 races.

=== Slalom ===
Rank		Points
1	(Netherlands) Marcella Boerma	3520
2	(Germany) Heidi Renoth	3010
3	(France) Karine Ruby	2980
4	(Germany) Amalie Kulawik	2440
5	(Austria) Alexandra Krings	2400

- Standings after 5 races.

=== Parallel ===
Rank		Points
1	(Italy) Marion Posch	3400
2	(Germany) Heidi Renoth	3060
3	(Netherlands) Marcella Boerma	2690
4	(France) Karine Ruby	2620
5	(Germany) Steffi Prentl	2230

- Standings after 5 races.

=== Halfpipe ===
Rank		Points
1	(United States) Sabrina Sadeghi	4800
2	(United States) Annemarie Uliasz	4000
3	(United States) Cammy Potter	2800
4	(United States) Stacia Hookom	1810
5	(United States) Listle Stokstad	1602

- Standings after 5 races.

== Podium table by nation ==
Table showing the World Cup podium places (gold–1st place, silver–2nd place, bronze–3rd place) by the countries represented by the athletes.

Rank	Nation	Gold	Silver	Bronze	Total
1	United States	16	12	19	47
2	Germany	8	6	6	20
3	France	8	4	2	14
4	Austria	4	10	5	19
5	Netherlands	4	6	4	14
6	Italy	3	4	7	14
7	Denmark	2	2	0	4
8	Canada	1	0	1	2
9	Switzerland	0	1	2	3
10	Japan	0	1	0	1
Totals (10 entries)		46	46	46	138
