= Snowboarding at the 1998 Winter Olympics – Women's giant slalom =

Women's Giant Slalom at the XVIII Olympic Winter Games
- Venue: Mount Yakebitai
- Date: 10 February 1998
- Competitors: 31 from 14 nations
- Winning time: 2:17.34

Medalists
1st place, gold medalist(s)		Karine Ruby	France
2nd place, silver medalist(s)		Heidi Renoth	Germany
3rd place, bronze medalist(s)		Brigitte Köck	Austria

The women's giant slalom competition of the Nagano 1998 Olympics was held at Mount Yakebitai on 10 February.

It was the first time snowboarding was added as a sport at the Winter Olympic Games. The giant slalom was replaced by the parallel giant slalom event in 2002 in Salt Lake City.

== Medalists ==
Gold	Karine Ruby; France
Silver	Heidi Renoth; Germany
Bronze	Brigitte Köck; Austria

== Results ==
Rank	Bib	Name	Nationality	Run 1	Rank	Run 2	Rank	Total	Difference
1st place, gold medalist(s)	2	Karine Ruby	France	1:09.33	1	1:08.01	6	2:17.34	-
2nd place, silver medalist(s)	1	Heidi Renoth	Germany	1:11.92	5	1:07.25	3	2:19.17	+1.83
3rd place, bronze medalist(s)	11	Brigitte Köck	Austria	1:13.01	7	1:06.41	2	2:19.42	+2.08
4	15	Lidia Trettel	Italy	1:11.68	3	1:08.03	8	2:19.71	+2.37
5	17	Ursula Fingerlos	Austria	1:12.37	6	1:07.99	5	2:20.36	+3.02
6	8	Marion Posch	Italy	1:13.32	8	1:08.02	7	2:21.34	+4.00
7	4	Dagi Mair unter der Eggen	Italy	1:13.35	9	1:09.07	13	2:22.42	+5.08
8	6	Isabel Zedlacher	Austria	1:11.89	4	1:11.03	15	2:22.92	+5.58
9	19	Sandra Farmand	Germany	1:14.39	10	1:08.71	12	2:23.10	+5.76
10	20	Marie Birkl	Sweden	1:15.99	13	1:07.92	4	2:23.91	+6.57
11	23	Cécile Plancherel	Switzerland	1:15.84	12	1:08.23	9	2:24.07	+6.73
12	12	Sondra Van Ert	United States	1:17.89	16	1:08.67	11	2:26.56	+9.22
13	14	Margherita Parini	Italy	1:21.42	20	1:06.15	1	2:27.57	+10.23
14	25	Heidi Jaufenthaler	Austria	1:18.43	17	1:09.51	14	2:27.94	+10.60
15	22	Shinobu Ueshima	Japan	1:16.88	14	1:11.17	16	2:28.05	+10.71
16	18	Charlotte Bernard	France	1:14.43	11	1:14.30	18	2:28.73	+11.39
17	24	Nathalie Desmares	France	1:21.43	21	1:08.42	10	2:29.85	+12.51
18	29	Renate Keller	Switzerland	1:19.48	19	1:12.32	17	2:31.80	+14.46
19	27	Małgorzata Rosiak	Poland	1:19.41	18	1:19.53	19	2:38.94	+21.60
20	28	Mariya Dimova	Bulgaria	1:23.31	23	1:19.53	20	2:42.84	+25.50
21	30	Marousa Pappou	Greece	1:33.55	24	1:22.98	21	2:56.53	+39.19
-	3	Isabelle Blanc	France	1:11.28	2	DSQ	-	-	-
-	16	Polona Zupan	Slovenia	1:16.90	15	DNF	-	-	-
-	13	Steffi von Siebenthal	Switzerland	1:21.93	22	DNS	-	-	-
-	5	Rosey Fletcher	United States	DNF	-	-	-	-	-
-	7	Burgl Heckmair	Germany	DNF	-	-	-	-	-
-	9	Betsy Shaw	United States	DSQ	-	-	-	-	-
-	10	Lisa Kosglow	United States	DNF	-	-	-	-	-
-	21	Jana Šedová	Slovakia	DNF	-	-	-	-	-
-	26	Jagna Marczułajtis	Poland	DNF	-	-	-	-	-
-	31	Pamela Bell	New Zealand	DNF	-	-	-	-	-

DSQ - Disqualified; DNS - Did not start; DNF - Did not finish
