= Kastenholz =

Kastenholz may refer to:

- Bernd Kastenholz (born 1960), German research technologist and inventor, Alzheimer's researcher
- Christoph Kastenholz (born 1990), German entrepreneur, co-founder and CEO of Pulse Advertising
- Kastenholz, the German name for Cașolț, a village in Roșia, Sibiu, Romania

== See also ==
- Ueli Kestenholz (1975–2026), Swiss snowboarder
