= Ueshima =

Ueshima may refer to:

== People ==
- Ryuhei Ueshima (1961–2022), Japanese comedian
- Sannosuke Ueshima (1893–1987), Japanese martial arts master
- Shinobu Ueshima (born 1971), Japanese snowboarder

== Other uses ==
- UCC Ueshima Coffee Co.
