= Heckmair =

Heckmair is a surname. Notable people with the surname include:

- Anderl Heckmair (1906–2005), German mountain climber and guide
- Burgl Heckmair (born 1976), German snowboarder
