= Rosiak =

Rosiak is a surname. Notable people with the surname include:

- Aleksandra Rosiak (born 1997), Polish handballer
- Małgorzata Rosiak (born 1977), Polish snowboarder
- Michał Rosiak (born 2005), Polish footballer
