= Heidi Jaufenthaler =

Austrian snowboarder

Personal information
- Nationality: Austrian
- Born: 8 November 1977 (age 47); Lienz, Austria

Sport
- Country: Austria
- Sport: Snowboarding

Heidi Jaufenthaler (born 8 November 1977) is an Austrian snowboarder. She was born in Lienz. She competed at the 1998 Winter Olympics, in giant slalom.
