= André Grütter =

Swiss snowboarder

Personal information
- Nationality: Swiss
- Born: 15 June 1976 (age 48); Bern, Switzerland

Sport
- Sport: Snowboarding

André Grütter (born 15 June 1976) is a Swiss snowboarder. He competed in the men's giant slalom event at the 1998 Winter Olympics.
