= Adam Hostetter =

American snowboarder (born 1974)

Personal information
- Born: December 22, 1974 (age 51) Cape Cod, Massachusetts, United States

Sport
- Sport: Snowboarding

Adam Hostetter (born December 22, 1974) is an American snowboarder. He competed in the men's giant slalom event at the 1998 Winter Olympics.
