= Guillaume Nantermod =

Swiss snowboarder (born 1975)

Medal record

Men's snowboarding

Representing Switzerland

World Championships
Gold medal – first place	2001 Madonna di Campiglio	Snowboard Cross

Guillaume Nantermod (born 18 September 1975) is a Swiss retired snowboarder. He is 2001 World Champion in snowboardcross. In the 1999–2000 World Cup season, he finished 2nd in snowboardcross and clinched two victories. He retired in 2007 after the World Championships on home soil where he finished 9th. In total, he has 9 World Cup podiums.

After retiring from competitive sports, he worked as instructor and coach and was British Ski & Snowboard Cross Head Coach.
