= Małgorzata Rosiak =

Polish snowboarder (born 1977)

Personal information
- Born: 8 September 1977 (age 48) Gliwice, Poland
- Height: 170 cm (5 ft 7 in)
- Weight: 67 kg (148 lb)

Sport
- Country: Poland
- Sport: Snowboarding

Małgorzata Rosiak-Brawańska (born 8 September 1977) is a Polish former snowboarder. She competed in the women's giant slalom event at the 1998 Winter Olympics. She was a medalist at the Junior World Championships, the World Championships and the European Championships and won 20 medals at the national championships, including 14 gold.

== Biography ==
Rosiak was born on 8 September 1977 in Gliwice, Poland. Her father, Dariusz, served as the first president of the Polish Snowboarding Association and was one of the first promoters of snowboarding in the country. Her mother, Renata, and sister, Joanna, also each practiced snowboarding. She first tried out the sport at age 12, having received a snowboard from her father as a Christmas present. She became interested in snowboarding while visiting the Alps, saying that there, "I saw snowboarders for the first time. From the very beginning, I was captivated by the freedom of movement people had on boards. I convinced my dad to buy me a snowboard." Coached by her father, she was a member of the club Beskidzkiego Stow. Snowboardu. At age 15, she participated at the first Polish Championships, winning two gold medals in the junior slalom event. In 1993, she competed in the senior category at the national championships and won gold in the slalom and giant slalom.

Rosiak attended High School No. 7 in Gliwice and later the University of Physical Education in Katowice. In January 1994, she competed at the Junior World Championships at Rogla Ski Resort in Slovenia, winning the silver medal behind Heidi Renoth in the parallel slalom while finishing fourth in the combined event. She was the top Polish performer at the Junior Championships and helped the team finish eighth place out of 18 participating nations. Rosiak competed at the Slovenian championships a few days later and won a gold medal. She won the 1994 Polish championship in the slalom, giant slalom, parallel slalom and finished as runner-up in the combined event. Later that year, at the World Cup, she missed out on the finals in the parallel slalom by a half-second.

At the end of the 1994–95 World Cup season, Rosiak was ranked the fourth-best female snowboarder in the world in combined, with Michelle Taggart taking first place. Her ranking was the highest any Polish snowboarder had ever achieved by that time. In 1995, she won bronze at the Junior World Championships in Zakopane. She also won a bronze medal at the World Championships in combined, won four medals at the West Continental Open, and at the national championships won three gold medals (giant slalom, halfpipe, combined) and a silver (parallel slalom) in 1995. She concluded the 1995–96 season ranked third in the world, becoming the first person from Poland to finish top-three in World Cup standings.

Rosiak won three national championships in 1996 (giant slalom, halfpipe, combined) and a medal at the Junior World Championships. In 1997, she won a bronze medal at the World Championships in combined and won a silver at the European Championships in the same event. With medals at the Junior World Championships, World Championships, European Championships and the World Cup, she became the most decorated Polish snowboarder at the time. She also placed eighth in the parallel slalom and 32nd in the giant slalom at the 1997 World Championships. Additionally, she won the halfpipe championship and finished as runner-up in the giant slalom and parallel slalom at the 1997 Polish championships. Rosiak participated at the 1998 Winter Olympics in Nagano, finishing 19th in the women's giant slalom event. She won the Polish halfpipe and combined championships that year, and won two bronze medals at the 1999 Polish championships. She also participated at the 1999 World Championships, with a best placement of 16th in the snowboardcross, and at the 2000 European Cup, finishing 15th. In her career, she won 14 gold and four silver medals at the Polish championships.

Rosiak wrote a book with her father on snowboarding, titled Nauka jazdy na snowboardzie w weekend (ISBN 9788371849954). She attended Stockholm University and Kraków University of Economics and received a Master of Business Administration (MBA) in 2010. After her competitive career, she served as the chief executive officer (CEO) for Nobile Sports Sp. z O.O., a sports equipment company founded by her father, from 2009 to 2018.
