= Polona Zupan =

Slovenian snowboarder (born 1976)

Personal information
- Nationality: Slovenian
- Born: 9 March 1976 (age 49); Naklo, Yugoslavia

Sport
- Sport: Snowboarding

Polona Zupan (born 9 March 1976) is a Slovenian snowboarder. She competed in the women's giant slalom event at the 1998 Winter Olympics.
