= Jonas Gunnarsson (snowboarder) =

Swedish snowboarder

Personal information
- Nationality: Swedish
- Born: 8 September 1977 (age 47); Sweden

Sport
- Sport: Snowboarding

Jonas Gunnarsson (born 8 September 1977) is a Swedish retired snowboarder. He won Halfpipe World Cup in the 1996–97 season. He also competed at two World Championships (in 1997 and 1999).

== World Cup podiums ==
Date	Location	Event	Rank
1997	(Canada) Whistler	HP	1st
1997	(Canada) Whistler	HP	1st
1997	(Italy) Olang	HP	2nd
1998	(Sweden) Tandådalen	HP	3rd
