= Pamela Bell =

New Zealand snowboarder (born 1972)

Personal information
- Nationality: New Zealand
- Born: 21 December 1972 (age 52); Wellington, New Zealand

Sport
- Sport: Snowboarding

Pamela Bell (born 21 December 1972) is a New Zealand snowboarder. She competed in the women's giant slalom event at the 1998 Winter Olympics.
