= Cécile Plancherel =

Swiss snowboarder

Personal information
- Nationality: Swiss
- Born: 28 October 1970 (age 54)

Sport
- Country: Switzerland
- Sport: Snowboarding

Cécile Plancherel (born 28 October 1970) is a Swiss snowboarder. She competed at the 1998 Winter Olympics, in giant slalom.
