= Charlotte Bernard =

French snowboarder (born 1972)

Personal information
- Nationality: French
- Born: 1 June 1972 (age 52)

Sport
- Sport: Snowboarding

Charlotte Bernard (born 1 June 1972) is a French snowboarder. She competed in women's giant slalom at the 1998 Winter Olympics in Nagano.
