= Willi Trakofler =

Italian snowboarder

Personal information
- Nationality: Italian
- Born: 27 April 1973 (age 53) Welsberg-Taisten, Italy

Sport
- Sport: Snowboarding

Willi Trakofler (born 27 April 1973) is an Italian snowboarder. He competed in the men's giant slalom event at the 1998 Winter Olympics.
