= Shinobu Ueshima =

Japanese snowboarder (born 1971)

Personal information
- Nationality: Japanese
- Born: 26 December 1971 (age 53); Hokkaido, Japan

Sport
- Sport: Snowboarding

Shinobu Ueshima (born 26 December 1971) is a Japanese snowboarder. She competed in the women's giant slalom event at the 1998 Winter Olympics.
