= Kentaro Miyawaki =

Japanese snowboarder (born 1978)

Personal information
- Nationality: Japanese
- Born: 21 July 1978 (age 46); Hakuba, Japan

Sport
- Sport: Snowboarding

Kentaro Miyawaki (born 21 July 1978) is a Japanese snowboarder. He competed in the men's halfpipe event at the 2002 Winter Olympics.
