= Mount Naeba =

Stratovolcano on the island of Honshu, Japan

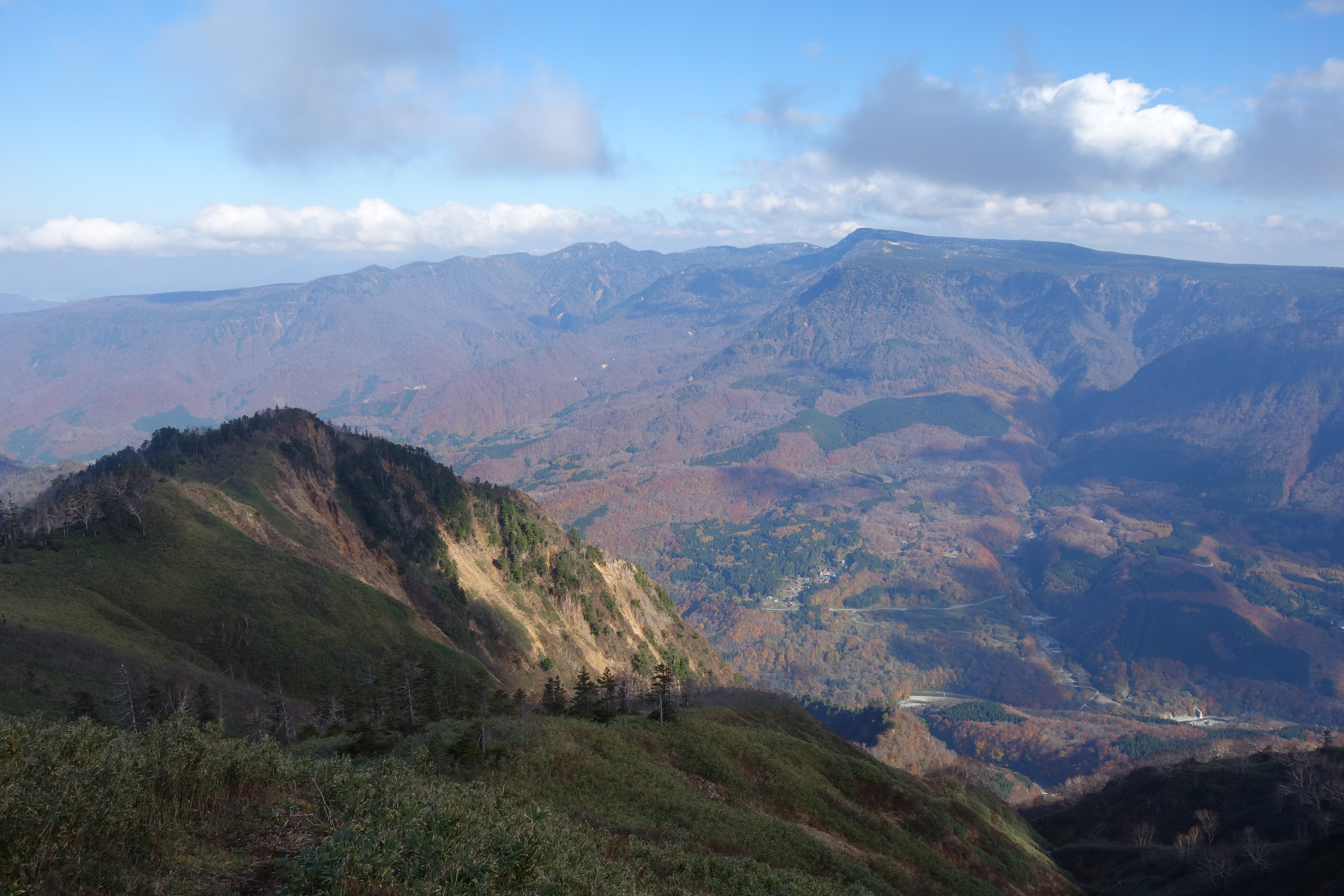
- Naeba Volcano seen from the west

Highest point
- Elevation: 2,145.3 m (7,038 ft)
- Listing: List of mountains and hills of Japan by height
- Coordinates: 36°50′45″N 138°41′25″E

Naming
- Native name: 苗場山 (Japanese)

Geography
- Location within Japan
- Location: Nagano and Niigata prefectures, Japan
- Parent range: Mikuni Mountains
- Topo map(s): Geographical Survey Institute 25000:1 苗場山, 50000:1 高田

Geology
- Volcanic arc: Northeastern Japan Arc

Climbing
- Easiest route: Hike

Mount Naeba (苗場山, Naeba-san) is a stratovolcano on the border of Nagano and Niigata prefectures in central Honshū, Japan. It is about 200 km (124 mi) from Tokyo. It was active between 200,000 and 800,000 years ago. It is primarily made of andesite. It is one of the 100 Famous Japanese Mountains.

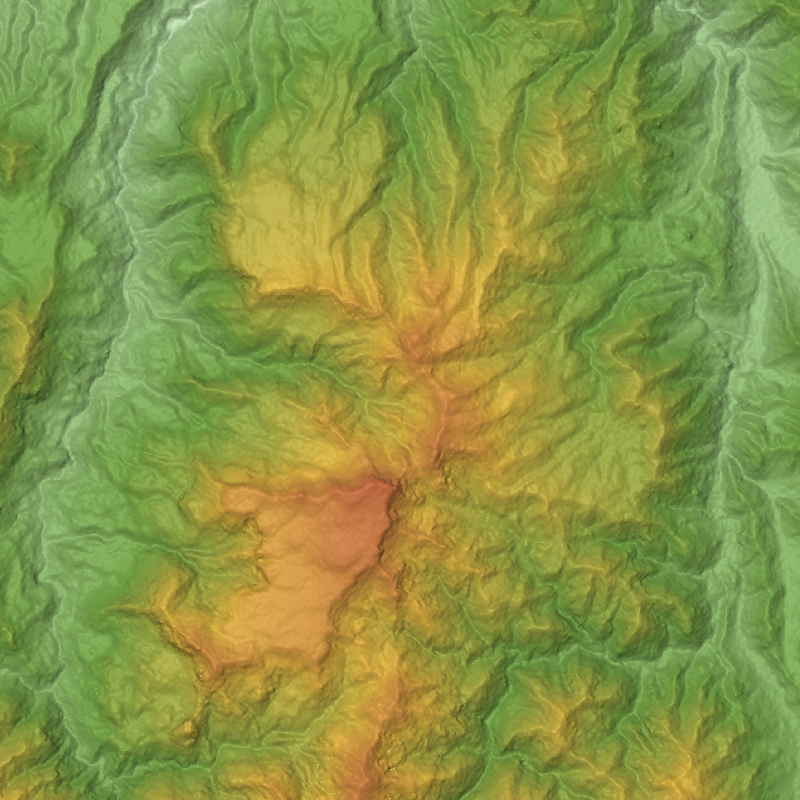
Relief map of Naeba Volcano.

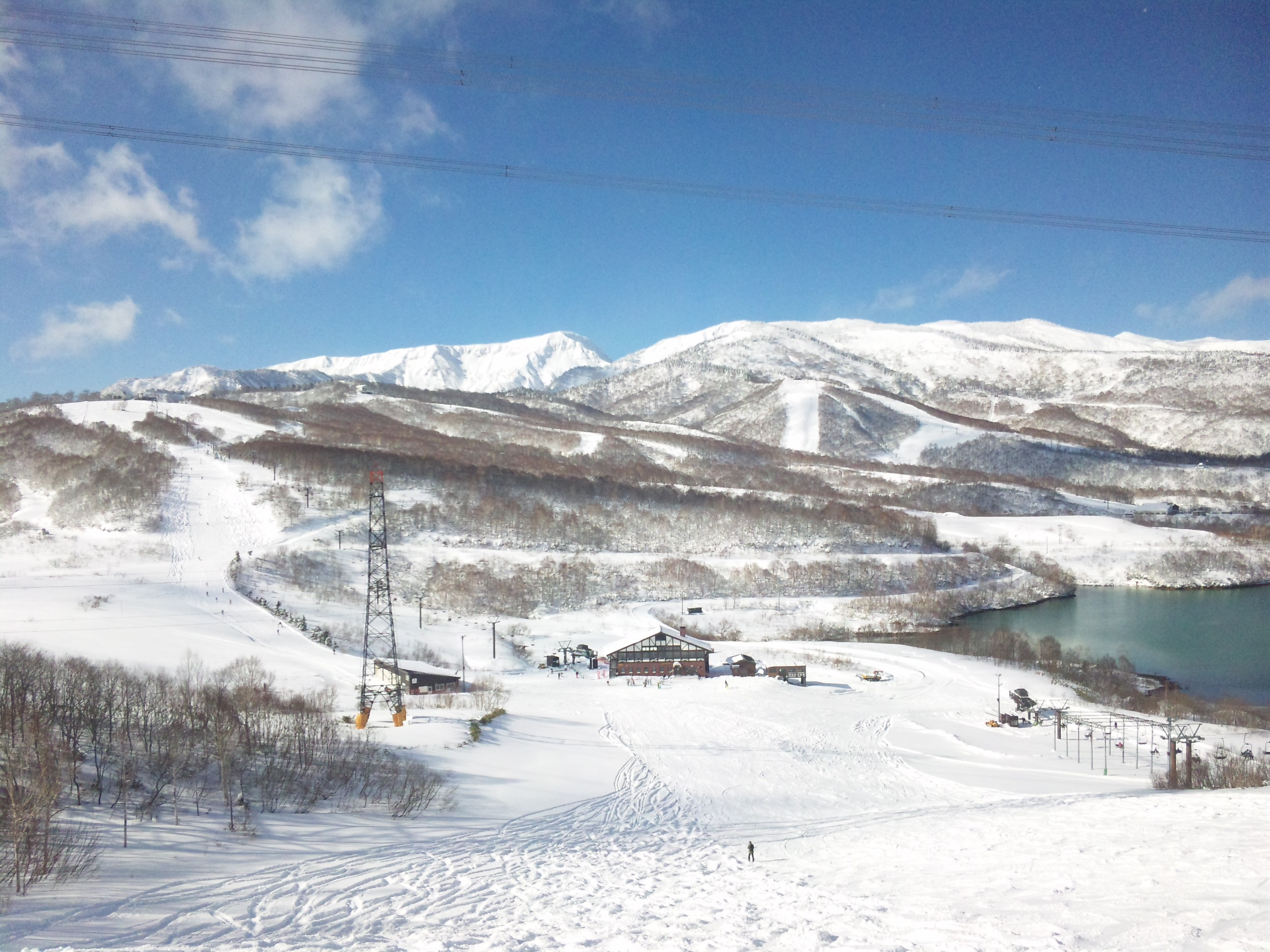
Naeba Volcano seen from the east.

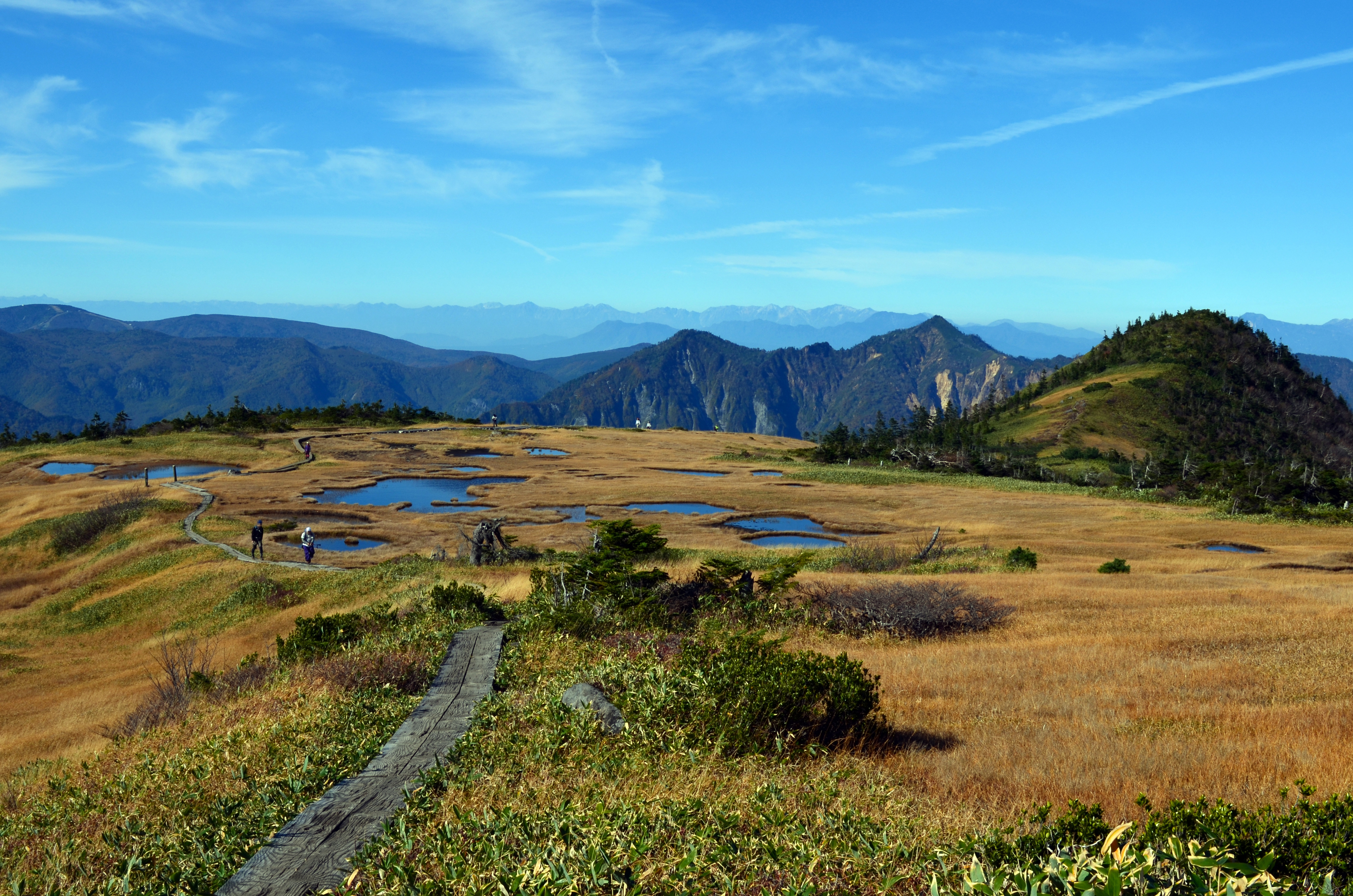
The wetland area of Mount Naeba.

== See also ==
- List of volcanoes in Japan
- List of mountains in Japan
