= Kambayashi =

Kambayashi (written: 神林 or 上林) is a Japanese surname. Notable people with the surname include:

- Akatsuki Kambayashi (上林 暁, 1902–1980), Japanese writer
- Chōhei Kambayashi (神林 長平, born 1953), Japanese writer
