= Christoph Kastenholz =

German entrepreneur

Christoph Kastenholz (born 28 October 1990) is a German entrepreneur, co-founder and CEO of Pulse Advertising.

Originally from Bonn, Germany, Kastenholz graduated from EU Business School in 2013, and founded Pulse Advertising in 2014. He was awarded as FORBES 30under30 (2018) and has been a speaker at TEDx.

Kastenholz appeared on Der Meta Podcast with Julia Brewing, discussing influencer marketing and regularly hosts webinars sharing influencer marketing insights.
