= Trevor Andrew =

Canadian snowboarder (born 1979)

Personal information
- Born: 31 August 1979 (age 47) Kentville, Nova Scotia, Canada

Sport
- Sport: Snowboarding

Trevor Andrew (born 31 August 1979) is a Canadian snowboarder, musician and artist. He competed at the 1998 Winter Olympics and the 2002 Winter Olympics. After an injury in 2005, he turned his attention to music, signing with Virgin Records and re-releasing his first album Trouble Andrew in 2009.

== Snowboarding ==
While riding for Burton Snowboards he competed in the 1998 Winter Olympics half-pipe event, finishing in 29th place, and the 2002 Winter Olympics half-pipe event, finishing in 9th place. In 2004, after an injury which saw him break six ribs and crack a vertebra, he retired from professional competition.

== Guccighost ==
In 2012 Andrew came up with the alter ego Guccighost as a last minute Halloween costume. Continuing to use this persona, he started to spread the logo around New York City until in 2016 his unique designs caught the attention of fashion house Gucci, which led to an ongoing collaboration. His work was displayed across the facade of the flagship Gucci Fifth Avenue Store for the official launch of the fall winter 2016 collection, and has been worn by a number of celebrities such as Rihanna, Beyonce, Madonna, Nas and Zöe Kravitz.

== Personal life ==
Andrew was previously married to multi-genre artist Santigold and shares three children together.

== Art career ==
Further artistic endeavors since then have seen his work displayed in galleries worldwide, among them Deitch Projects, Milk Galleries and Modern Art Museum Shanghai.

In November 2020, Andrew released an NFT collection on Nifty Gateway, which was followed up in March 2021 with his Can't Kill A Ghost collection which sold for a total of $3.1 million. Since those releases, he has continued to work within the NFT space and has released his work at Sotheby's and Christie's auction houses.
