= Tara Teigen =

Canadian snowboarder

Personal information
- Born: 28 June 1975 (age 50) Calgary, Alberta, Canada

Sport
- Sport: Snowboarding

Tara Teigen (born 28 June 1975) is a Canadian snowboarder. She competed in the women's halfpipe event at the 1998 Winter Olympics.
