= Natasza Zurek =

Canadian snowboarder

Personal information
- Nationality: Canadian
- Born: 4 March 1978 (age 47); Zakopane, Poland

Sport
- Sport: Snowboarding

Natasza Zurek (born 4 March 1978) is a Polish-born Canadian half-pipe snowboarder who placed 25th at the 1998 Winter Olympics and 15th in 2002.
