= Tomas Johansson (snowboarder) =

Swedish snowboarder

Personal information
- Nationality: Swedish
- Born: 9 March 1979 (age 46); Kiruna, Sweden

Sport
- Sport: Snowboarding

Tomas Johansson (born 9 March 1979) is a Swedish snowboarder. He competed in the men's halfpipe event at the 2002 Winter Olympics.
