= Klas Vangen =

Norwegian snowboarder

Personal information
- Nationality: Norwegian
- Born: 18 September 1978 (age 47) Molde Municipality, Norway

Sport
- Sport: Snowboarding

Klas Vangen (born 18 September 1978) is a Norwegian snowboarder. He competed in the men's halfpipe event at the 1998 Winter Olympics.
