= Fadri Mosca =

Swiss snowboarder

Personal information
- Nationality: Swiss
- Born: 4 November 1973 (age 51)

Sport
- Sport: Snowboarding

Fadri Mosca (born 4 November 1973) is a Swiss snowboarder. He competed in the men's giant slalom event at the 1998 Winter Olympics.
