= Renate Keller =

Swiss snowboarder

Personal information
- Nationality: Swiss
- Born: 25 October 1961 (age 64)

Sport
- Country: Switzerland
- Sport: Snowboarding

Renate Keller (born 25 October 1961) is a Swiss snowboarder. She competed at the 1998 Winter Olympics. She competed in the women's giant slalom, where she placed 18th.
