= Jonas Aspman =

Swedish snowboarder (born 1973)

Personal information
- Nationality: Swedish
- Born: 2 July 1973 (age 51); Leksand, Sweden

Sport
- Sport: Snowboarding

Jonas Aspman (born 2 July 1973) is a Swedish snowboarder. He competed in the men's parallel giant slalom event at the 2002 Winter Olympics.
