= Anna Olofsson =

Swedish snowboarder

Personal information
- Nationality: Swedish
- Born: 17 September 1981 (age 43); Östersund, Sweden

Sport
- Country: Sweden
- Sport: Snowboarding

Anna Olofsson (born 17 September 1981) is a Swedish snowboarder. She was born in Östersund. She competed at the 2006 Winter Olympics, in halfpipe.
