= Stacia Hookom =

American snowboarder

Personal information
- National team: U.S. Snowboarding
- Born: July 22, 1975 (age 50) Denver, Colorado, U.S.
- Education: University of Colorado
- Years active: 1993-2007
- Height: 5 ft 3 in (160 cm)
- Other interests: Skiing, various hobbies

Sport
- Country: U.S.
- Sport: Snowboarding
- Event(s): Slalom, giant slalom, parallel slalom, half-pipe
- Retired: 2007

Achievements and titles
- World finals: 9 World Cup placements
- Regional finals: 6 first place titles in the Nor-Am Cup
- National finals: At least 4 first place titles

Stacia Hookom (born July 22, 1975) is an American former snowboarder and the first woman named to the first U.S. Snowboarding team in the 1994–1995 season, with multiple placements (including first) in the FIS Snowboard World Cup and the U.S. Snowboarding Grand Prix. She also has six national championship titles. Hookom retired in 2007 at the age of 31.

== Early life and education ==
Hookom was born on July 22, 1975, in Denver, Colorado, though she would grow up in Edwards, Colorado, and began skiing at age 3. Around the age of 14, she began snowboarding when she and a friend took a free lesson at Vail Ski Resort, though she would mostly compete in alpine skiing, mixed with some freeriding, until she focused on snowboarding for "better opportunities," entering her first official snowboard competition at 17. She attended the University of Colorado Boulder, where she joined her legacy sorority Alpha Phi, and cites support from her mother and sorority sisters as helping her maintain a strong work ethic and normal lifestyle, respectively. Since she competed through college, she would put classes on hold and return to them when injuries (including an ACL tear) dictated that she would have to stop snowboarding temporarily.

== Career ==
In 1994, Hookom was the first woman to join the U.S. Snowboarding team. She noted changes in snowboarding throughout her career: "For me, the most difficult change was when breakaway poles were replaced with stubbies in slalom. My favorite event was slalom and the poles gave me my timing and rhythm in the event. So, when we lost the poles the event just was not the same." In an interview at the point of her retirement, she stated that at the beginning, "lots of people still competed in all events. Sometimes the 'stylers' would show up and enter the races. I usually did the halfpipe. Now, the sports are so competitive it is really impossible to do them all."

=== World Championships ===
In the 1996 FIS Snowboard World Championships, Hookum started her career by placing 8th for the parallel slalom and 12th for the grand slalom.

=== World Cup placement statistics ===
In the 1995 World Cup, Hookum placed fifth overall for the giant slalom and fourth overall in Half-pipe. Her 2003 7th place finish led the USA at Sapporo in the women's division, with Chris Klug leading the men's in 19th place. Displayed in this table are World Cup placements that are either notable or her best of that season:

Season	Age	Race	Slalom	Giant slalom	Parallel slalom	Parallel giant	Half - pipe	Super Giant Slalom
1995	19	(France) Les Deux Alpes	—	3	7	—	—	—
		(Germany) Bad Hindelang-Oberjoch	—	2	4	—	—	—
		(Japan) Alts	—	3	—	—	5	—
		(Canada) Calgary	3	5	3	—	8	—
1996	20	(Japan) Kanbayashi	2	—	—	—	11 (13)	—
		(Germany) Bad Hindelang-Oberjoch	—	8	5	—	—	—
		(Canada) Calgary	—	—	9	—	11	—
1997	21	(Austria) Kreischberg	—	—	3	—	—	—
1998	22	(Austria) Sölden	—	—	2	—	—	—
1999	23	(United States) Mount Bachelor	—	—	—	—	—	10
2000	24	(Canada) Whistler	—	10	—	—	—	—
2001	25	(Italy) Kronplatz	—	—	7	—	—	—
2002	26	(Italy) Bardonecchia	—	9	—	—	—	—
2003	27	(Austria) Sölden	—	—	6	2	—	—
		(Japan) Sapporo	—	—	—	7	—	—
2004	28	(United States) Mount Bachelor	—	—	6	—	—	—
2005	29	(Japan) Sapporo	—	—	8	—	—	—
2006	30	(United States) Lake Placid	—	—	—	3	—	—

=== National titles ===
Hookom has multiple national championship titles for the U.S. Snowboarding Grand Prix. In 2002, she won two titles in that year's race alone. Displayed in this table are her placements:

Season	Age	Race	Slalom	Giant slalom	Parallel slalom	Parallel giant	Half pipe
1993	17	(United States) Vail (J-I)	1	—	—	—	—
1994	18	(United States) June Mountain	1	5	—	—	—
1995	19	(United States) Sugarloaf	—	2	—	—	6
1996	20	(DNC, injury)	—	—	—	—	—
1997	21	—	—	—	—	—	—
1998	22	(United States) Sunday River	3	2	—	—	23
1999	23	—	—	—	—	—	—
2000	24	(United States) Okemo	2	5	—	—	—
2001	25	(United States) Sunday River	2	—	—	—	—
2002	26	(United States) Truckee/Northstar	1	—	—	1	—

Listed are her placements in the Nor-Am Cup for snowboarding:

Season	Month	Age	Race	Slalom	Giant slalom	Parallel slalom	Parallel giant
2001-02	Nov	26	(United States) Copper Mountain	—	13	—	17
	Dec		(United States) Park City	—	—	—	7
	Jan		(United States) Mount Bachelor	—	—	—	1
2002-03	Dec	27	(United States) Park City	—	—	—	3
	Feb		(United States) Mount Bachelor	—	—	—	1
	Apr		(United States) Aspen	2	—	—	1
2003-04	Nov	28	(United States) Copper Mountain	—	—	2	7
	Dec		(United States) Park City	—	—	—	18
	Mar		(United States) Crystal Mountain	—	—	1	1
	Mar		(United States) Breckenridge	—	—	—	2
2004-05	Nov	29	(United States) Copper Mountain	—	—	4	11
	Dec		(United States) Breckenridge	—	—	—	4
	Jan		(United States) Steamboat Springs	—	—	9	9
	Mar		(Canada) Sun Peaks	—	—	10	7
2005-06	Nov	30	(United States) Copper Mountain	—	—	—	3 (14)
	Dec		(United States) Okemo	—	—	—	2 (8)
	Mar		(United States) Crystal Mountain	—	—	12	—
2006-07	Nov	31	(United States) Copper Mountain	—	—	13	7
	Jan		(United States) Steamboat Springs	—	—	6	3

== Retirement ==
In January 2007, Hookum retired at age 31 and returned to the University of Colorado Boulder to finish her degree. She moved to Houston, Texas, and planned on going to school to become a physician assistant; she stated that she would like to coach but her geographical location made that difficult.
