= Mike Kildevæld =

Danish snowboarder

Personal information
- Nationality: Danish
- Born: 7 August 1966 (age 58); Kalundborg, Denmark

Sport
- Sport: Snowboarding

Mike Kildevæld (born 7 August 1966) is a Danish snowboarder. He competed in the men's giant slalom event at the 1998 Winter Olympics.
