= Nicolas Conte =

French snowboarder (born 1973)

Personal information
- Nationality: French
- Born: 26 December 1973 (age 51); Annecy, France

Sport
- Sport: Snowboarding

Nicolas Conte (born 26 December 1973) is a French snowboarder. He competed in the men's giant slalom event at the 1998 Winter Olympics.
