= Marie Birkl =

Swedish snowboarder (born 1981)

Personal information
- Nationality: Swedish
- Born: 1 February 1981 (age 44); Mariefred, Sweden

Sport
- Country: Sweden
- Sport: Snowboarding

Marie Birkl (born 1 February 1981) is a Swedish snowboarder. She was born in Mariefred. She competed at the 1998 Winter Olympics, in giant slalom.
