= Jonathan Collomb-Patton =

French snowboarder (born 1979)

Personal information
- Nationality: French
- Born: 4 March 1979 (age 46); Annecy, France

Sport
- Sport: Snowboarding

Jonathan Collomb-Patton (born 4 March 1979) is a French snowboarder. He competed at the 1998 Winter Olympics and the 2002 Winter Olympics.
