= Martin Freinademetz =

Austrian snowboarder

Personal information
- Nationality: Austrian
- Born: 10 December 1969 (age 55); Innsbruck, Austria

Sport
- Sport: Snowboarding

Martin Freinademetz (born 10 December 1969) is an Austrian snowboarder. He competed in the men's giant slalom event at the 1998 Winter Olympics.
