= Dieter Happ =

Austrian snowboarder

Personal information
- Nationality: Austrian
- Born: 11 May 1970 (age 55) Innsbruck, Austria

Sport
- Sport: Snowboarding

Dieter Happ (born 11 May 1970) is an Austrian snowboarder. He competed in the men's giant slalom event at the 1998 Winter Olympics.
