= Burgl Heckmair =

German snowboarder

Personal information
- Nationality: German
- Born: 2 January 1976 (age 49); Tegernsee, Germany

Sport
- Sport: Snowboarding

Burgl Heckmair (born 2 January 1976) is a German snowboarder. She competed in the women's giant slalom event at the 1998 Winter Olympics.
