= Brigitte Köck =

Austrian snowboarder (born 1970)

Olympic medal record

Representing Austria

Women's snowboarding
Bronze medal – third place	1998 Nagano	Giant Slalom

Brigitte "Gitti" Köck (born 18 May 1970 in Innsbruck) is an Austrian snowboarder and Olympic medalist. At the 1998 Winter Olympics in Nagano, Japan she won bronze in the Giant Slalom competition.

== Results ==
World Championships:

- 1x 2nd rank (1997)
- 2x 3rd rank (1999, 2000)
- 3x 4th rank (1999, 2001, 2002)

European Championships:

- 1x 1st rank (1995)
- 3x 2nd rank (1995, 1998, 1999)
- 1x 3rd rank (1996)

Worldcup / World Pro Tour:

- 45 times top-3
