= Sylvain Duclos =

French snowboarder (born 1978)

Personal information
- Nationality: French
- Born: 22 November 1978 (age 46); Thonon-les-Bains, France

Sport
- Sport: Snowboarding

Sylvain Duclos (born 22 November 1978) is a French snowboarder. He competed in the men's snowboard cross event at the 2006 Winter Olympics.
