= Christophe Ségura =

French snowboarder (born 1974)

Personal information
- Nationality: French
- Born: 21 August 1974 (age 50); Bourg-Saint-Maurice, France

Sport
- Sport: Snowboarding

Christophe Ségura (born 21 August 1974) is a French snowboarder. He competed at the 1998 Winter Olympics and the 2002 Winter Olympics.
