= Anna Hellman =

Swedish snowboarder

Personal information
- Nationality: Swedish
- Born: 29 November 1978 (age 46); Hudiksvall, Sweden

Sport
- Country: Sweden
- Sport: Snowboarding

Anna Hellman (born 29 November 1978) is a Swedish snowboarder. She was born in Hudiksvall, Gävleborg County. She competed at the 1998 Winter Olympics, in halfpipe.
