= Ueli Kestenholz =

Swiss snowboarder (1975–2026)

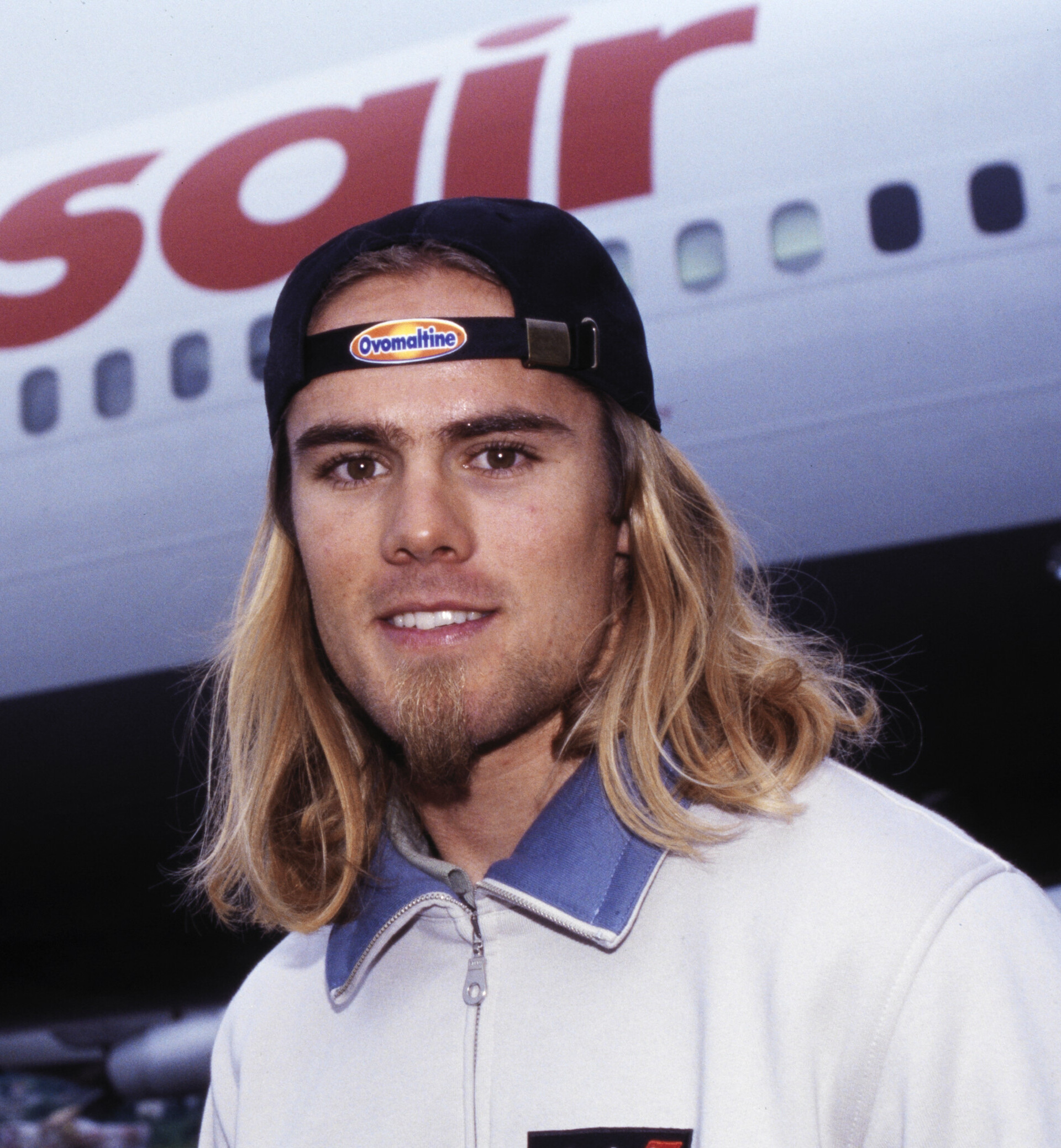

Medal record

Representing Switzerland

Men's snowboarding

Olympic Games
| Bronze medal – third place | 1998 Nagano | Giant Slalom |

Ueli Kestenholz (10 May 1975 – 11 January 2026) was a Swiss snowboarder and speed riding pioneer.

== Biography ==
Kestenholz was snowboard world champion in 2000 and 2001. He was one of the first-ever recipients of an Olympic medal in snowboarding (bronze) at the 1998 Winter Olympics (giant slalom). He was a two-time gold medalist at the Winter X-Games in snowboard cross (also known as boardercross). After his third Olympic Games, at Turin 2006, Kestenholz quit the World Cup circuit to focus 100% on freeriding.

Besides freeriding on a snowboard, he became one of the pioneers of speed flying and speed riding in Switzerland. In May 2009, he made the first speedriding descent of the Matterhorn. Together with Mathias Roten, he produced PlayGravity, an award-winning multisport-movie, showing their speedriding descent of Eiger, Mönch, and Jungfrau in one day.

Kestenholz died at the Spital Sion in Sion on 11 January 2026, after an avalanche accident in the Valais Alps. He was 50.
