= Karl Frenademez =

Italian snowboarder

Personal information
- Nationality: Italian
- Born: 11 March 1970 (age 55); San Cassiano, Italy

Sport
- Sport: Snowboarding

Karl Frenademez (born 11 March 1970) is an Italian snowboarder. He competed in the men's giant slalom event at the 1998 Winter Olympics.
