= Tricia Byrnes (snowboarder) =

American snowboarder (born 1974)

Personal information
- Born: Patricia Byrnes; November 18, 1974 (age 51) Greenwich, Connecticut, U.S.

Sport
- Sport: Snowboarding

Patricia "Tricia" Byrnes (born November 18, 1974) is an American snowboarder, born in Greenwich, Connecticut. Her achievements in the FIS Snowboard World Cup include 15 victories in halfpipe between 1997 and 2003 (also two second places and three third places), more than any other women as of 2019. She competed in women's halfpipe at the 2002 Winter Olympics in Salt Lake City, placing sixth in the final.
