= Darren Chalmers =

Canadian snowboarder

Personal information
- Nationality: Canadian
- Born: 26 June 1970 (age 54); Vancouver, British Columbia, Canada

Sport
- Sport: Snowboarding

Darren Chalmers (born 26 June 1970) is a Canadian snowboarder. He competed in the men's giant slalom event at the 1998 Winter Olympics.
