= Sébastien Vassoney =

French snowboarder (born 1975)

Personal information
- Nationality: French
- Born: 26 September 1975 (age 49); Manchester, England

Sport
- Sport: Snowboarding

Sébastien Vassoney (born 26 September 1975) is a French snowboarder. He competed in the men's halfpipe event at the 2002 Winter Olympics.
