= Pontus Ståhlkloo =

Swedish snowboarder

Personal information
- Nationality: Swedish
- Born: 5 June 1973 (age 51); Dalarna, Sweden

Sport
- Sport: Snowboarding

Pontus Ståhlkloo (born 5 June 1973) is a Swedish snowboarder. He competed in the men's halfpipe event at the 1998 Winter Olympics.
