= Thomas Prugger =

Italian snowboarder

Medal record

Representing Italy

Men's Snowboarding

Olympic Games
Silver medal – second place	1998 Nagano	Giant Slalom

FIS Snowboarding World Championships
Gold medal – first place	1997 Innichen	Giant Slalom

Thomas Prugger (born 23 October 1971) is an Italian snowboarder and Olympic medalist. He received a silver medal at the 1998 Winter Olympics in Nagano.
