= Fredrik Sterner =

Swedish snowboarder

Personal information
- Nationality: Swedish
- Born: 23 November 1978 (age 46); Leksand, Sweden

Sport
- Sport: Snowboarding

Fredrik Sterner (born 23 November 1978) is a Swedish snowboarder. He competed in the men's halfpipe event at the 1998 Winter Olympics.
