= Mark Fawcett (snowboarder) =

Canadian snowboarder

Personal information
- Born: 17 January 1972 (age 53); Saint John, New Brunswick, Canada

Sport
- Sport: Snowboarding

Mark Fawcett (born 17 January 1972) is a Canadian snowboarder. He competed at the 1998 Winter Olympics and the 2002 Winter Olympics.
