= Dieter Krassnig =

Austrian snowboarder

Personal information
- Nationality: Austrian
- Born: 3 August 1973 (age 53) Klagenfurt, Austria

Sport
- Sport: Snowboarding

Dieter Krassnig (born 3 August 1973) is an Austrian snowboarder. He competed at the 1998 Winter Olympics, the 2002 Winter Olympics and the 2006 Winter Olympics.
