= Isabel Zedlacher =

Austrian snowboarder

Personal information
- Nationality: Austrian
- Born: 12 December 1977 (age 47); Villach, Austria

Sport
- Country: Austria
- Sport: Snowboarding

Isabel Zedlacher (born 12 December 1977) is an Austrian snowboarder. She was born in Villach. She competed at the 1998 Winter Olympics, in giant slalom. She placed 8th in the competition.
