= Elmar Messner =

Italian snowboarder

Personal information
- Nationality: Italian
- Born: 28 August 1970 (age 54); Bruneck, Italy

Sport
- Sport: Snowboarding

Elmar Messner (born 28 August 1970) is an Italian snowboarder. He competed in the men's giant slalom event at the 1998 Winter Olympics.
