= List of Olympic medalists in snowboarding =

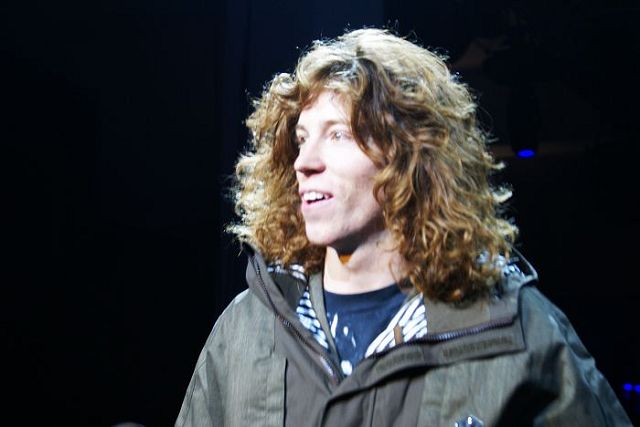
American Shaun White took the gold medal in the halfpipe contest at the 2006, 2010, and 2018 Winter Olympics.

Snowboarding is an Olympic sport that has been contested at the Winter Olympic Games since the 1998 Winter Olympics in Nagano, Japan. Snowboarding was one of five new sports or disciplines added to the Winter Olympic programme between 1990 and 2002, and was the only one not to have been a previous medal or demonstration event. In 1998, four events, two for men and two for women, were held in two specialities: the giant slalom, a downhill event similar to giant slalom skiing; and the half-pipe, in which competitors perform tricks while going from one side of a semi-circular ditch to the other. Canadian Ross Rebagliati won the men's giant slalom and became the first athlete to win a gold medal in snowboarding. Rebagliati was briefly stripped of his medal by the International Olympic Committee (IOC) after testing positive for marijuana. However, the IOC's decision was reverted following an appeal from the Canadian Olympic Association. For the 2002 Winter Olympics, the giant slalom was dropped in favour of the parallel giant slalom, an event that involves head-to-head racing. In 2006, a third event, the snowboard cross, was held for the first time. In this event, competitors race against each other down a course with jumps, beams and other obstacles.

New Zealander Zoi Sadowski-Synnott is the most decorated snowboarder in Olympic history with 5 Olympic medals. Three athletes have won four medals: Austrian Benjamin Karl, Italian Michela Moioli, and Chinese Su Yiming. Twelve athletes have won three medals: Americans Shaun White, Jamie Anderson, Lindsey Jacobellis, Chloe Kim and Kelly Clark; Canadians Éliot Grondin, Max Parrot and Mark McMorris; Czech Eva Adamczyková, Japanese Ayumu Hirano, Slovenian Žan Košir, and Russian Vic Wild.

== Men ==
=== Big air ===
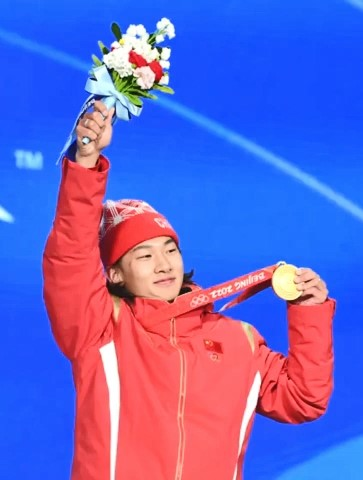
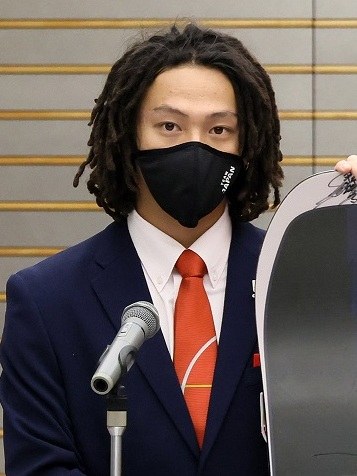
Prior to the 2026 Winter Olympics, Su Yiming of China & Ayumu Hirano of Japan were the only Asian gold medalists in Olympic snowboarding events.

Games	Gold	Silver	Bronze
2018 Pyeongchang	Sébastien Toutant; Canada	Kyle Mack; United States	Billy Morgan; Great Britain
2022 Beijing	Su Yiming; China	Mons Røisland; Norway	Max Parrot; Canada
2026 Milano Cortina	Kira Kimura; Japan	Ryoma Kimata; Japan	Su Yiming; China

Medals
Rank	Nation	Gold	Silver	Bronze	Total
1	Japan	1	1	0	2
2	Canada	1	0	1	2
2	China	1	0	1	2
4	Norway	0	1	0	1
4	United States	0	1	0	1
6	Great Britain	0	0	1	1
Total	6 nations	3	3	3	9

=== Halfpipe ===
Games	Gold	Silver	Bronze
1998 Nagano	Gian Simmen; Switzerland	Daniel Franck; Norway	Ross Powers; United States
2002 Salt Lake City	Ross Powers; United States	Danny Kass; United States	Jarret Thomas; United States
2006 Turin	Shaun White; United States	Danny Kass; United States	Markku Koski; Finland
2010 Vancouver	Shaun White; United States	Peetu Piiroinen; Finland	Scott Lago; United States
2014 Sochi	Iouri Podladtchikov; Switzerland	Ayumu Hirano; Japan	Taku Hiraoka; Japan
2018 Pyeongchang	Shaun White; United States	Ayumu Hirano; Japan	Scotty James; Australia
2022 Beijing	Ayumu Hirano; Japan	Scotty James; Australia	Jan Scherrer; Switzerland
2026 Milano Cortina	Yuto Totsuka; Japan	Scotty James; Australia	Ryusei Yamada; Japan

Medals
Rank	Nation	Gold	Silver	Bronze	Total
1	United States	4	2	3	9
2	Japan	2	2	2	6
3	Switzerland	2	0	1	3
4	Australia	0	2	1	3
5	Finland	0	1	1	2
6	Norway	0	1	0	1
Total	6 nations	8	8	8	24

=== Giant slalom (discontinued) ===
Games	Gold	Silver	Bronze
1998 Nagano	Ross Rebagliati; Canada	Thomas Prugger; Italy	Ueli Kestenholz; Switzerland

Medals
Rank	Nation	Gold	Silver	Bronze	Total
1	Canada	1	0	0	1
2	Italy	0	1	0	1
3	Switzerland	0	0	1	1
Total	3 nations	1	1	1	3

=== Parallel giant slalom ===
Games	Gold	Silver	Bronze
2002 Salt Lake City	Philipp Schoch; Switzerland	Richard Richardsson; Sweden	Chris Klug; United States
2006 Turin	Philipp Schoch; Switzerland	Simon Schoch; Switzerland	Siegfried Grabner; Austria
2010 Vancouver	Jasey-Jay Anderson; Canada	Benjamin Karl; Austria	Mathieu Bozzetto; France
2014 Sochi	Vic Wild; Russia	Nevin Galmarini; Switzerland	Žan Košir; Slovenia
2018 Pyeongchang	Nevin Galmarini; Switzerland	Lee Sang-ho; South Korea	Žan Košir; Slovenia
2022 Beijing	Benjamin Karl; Austria	Tim Mastnak; Slovenia	Vic Wild; ROC
2026 Milano Cortina	Benjamin Karl; Austria	Kim Sang-kyum; South Korea	Tervel Zamfirov; Bulgaria

Medals
Rank	Nation	Gold	Silver	Bronze	Total
1	Switzerland	3	2	0	5
2	Austria	2	1	1	4
3	Canada	1	0	0	1
3	Russia	1	0	0	1
5	South Korea	0	2	0	2
6	Slovenia	0	1	2	3
7	Sweden	0	1	0	1
8	Bulgaria	0	0	1	1
8	France	0	0	1	1
8	ROC	0	0	1	1
8	United States	0	0	1	1
Total	11 nations	7	7	7	21

=== Parallel slalom (discontinued) ===
Games	Gold	Silver	Bronze
2014 Sochi	Vic Wild; Russia	Žan Košir; Slovenia	Benjamin Karl; Austria

Medals
Rank	Nation	Gold	Silver	Bronze	Total
1	Russia	1	0	0	1
2	Slovenia	0	1	0	1
3	Austria	0	0	1	1
Total	3 nations	1	1	1	3

=== Snowboard cross ===
Games	Gold	Silver	Bronze
2006 Turin	Seth Wescott; United States	Radoslav Židek; Slovakia	Paul-Henri de Le Rue; France
2010 Vancouver	Seth Wescott; United States	Mike Robertson; Canada	Tony Ramoin; France
2014 Sochi	Pierre Vaultier; France	Nikolay Olyunin; Russia	Alex Deibold; United States
2018 Pyeongchang	Pierre Vaultier; France	Jarryd Hughes; Australia	Regino Hernández; Spain
2022 Beijing	Alessandro Hämmerle; Austria	Éliot Grondin; Canada	Omar Visintin; Italy
2026 Milano Cortina	Alessandro Hämmerle; Austria	Éliot Grondin; Canada	Jakob Dusek; Austria

Medals
Rank	Nation	Gold	Silver	Bronze	Total
1	France	2	0	2	4
2	United States	2	0	1	3
2	Austria	2	0	1	3
4	Canada	0	3	0	3
5	Australia	0	1	0	1
5	Russia	0	1	0	1
5	Slovakia	0	1	0	1
8	Spain	0	0	1	1
8	Italy	0	0	1	1
Total	9 nations	6	6	6	18

=== Slopestyle ===
Games	Gold	Silver	Bronze
2014 Sochi	Sage Kotsenburg; United States	Ståle Sandbech; Norway	Mark McMorris; Canada
2018 Pyeongchang	Red Gerard; United States	Max Parrot; Canada	Mark McMorris; Canada
2022 Beijing	Max Parrot; Canada	Su Yiming; China	Mark McMorris; Canada
2026 Milano Cortina	Su Yiming; China	Taiga Hasegawa; Japan	Jake Canter; United States

Medals
Rank	Nation	Gold	Green	Bronze	Total
1	United States	2	0	1	3
2	Canada	1	1	3	5
3	China	1	1	0	2
4	Japan	0	1	0	1
4	Norway	0	1	0	1
Total	5 nations	4	4	4	12

== Women ==
=== Big air ===
Games	Gold	Silver	Bronze
2018 Pyeongchang	Anna Gasser; Austria	Jamie Anderson; United States	Zoi Sadowski-Synnott; New Zealand
2022 Beijing	Anna Gasser; Austria	Zoi Sadowski-Synnott; New Zealand	Kokomo Murase; Japan
2026 Milano Cortina	Kokomo Murase; Japan	Zoi Sadowski-Synnott; New Zealand	Yu Seung-eun; South Korea

Medals
Rank	Nation	Gold	Silver	Bronze	Total
1	Austria	2	0	0	2
2	Japan	1	0	1	2
3	New Zealand	0	2	1	3
4	United States	0	1	0	1
5	South Korea	0	0	1	1
Total	4 nations	3	3	3	9

=== Halfpipe ===
Games	Gold	Silver	Bronze
1998 Nagano	Nicola Thost; Germany	Stine Brun Kjeldaas; Norway	Shannon Dunn; United States
2002 Salt Lake City	Kelly Clark; United States	Doriane Vidal; France	Fabienne Reuteler; Switzerland
2006 Turin	Hannah Teter; United States	Gretchen Bleiler; United States	Kjersti Buaas; Norway
2010 Vancouver	Torah Bright; Australia	Hannah Teter; United States	Kelly Clark; United States
2014 Sochi	Kaitlyn Farrington; United States	Torah Bright; Australia	Kelly Clark; United States
2018 Pyeongchang	Chloe Kim; United States	Liu Jiayu; China	Arielle Gold; United States
2022 Beijing	Chloe Kim; United States	Queralt Castellet; Spain	Sena Tomita; Japan
2026 Milano Cortina	Gaon Choi; South Korea	Chloe Kim; United States	Mitsuki Ono; Japan

Medals
Rank	Nation	Gold	Silver	Bronze	Total
1	United States	6	2	4	12
2	Australia	1	1	0	2
3	Germany	1	0	0	1
3	South Korea	1	0	0	1
5	Norway	0	1	1	2
6	France	0	1	0	1
6	Spain	0	1	0	1
6	China	0	1	0	1
9	Japan	0	0	2	2
10	Switzerland	0	0	1	1
Total	10 nations	8	8	8	24

=== Giant slalom (discontinued) ===
Games	Gold	Silver	Bronze
1998 Nagano	Karine Ruby; France	Heidi Maria Renoth; Germany	Brigitte Köck; Austria

Medals
Rank	Nation	Gold	Silver	Bronze	Total
1	France	1	0	0	1
2	Germany	0	1	0	1
3	Austria	0	0	1	1
Total	3 nations	1	1	1	3

=== Parallel giant slalom ===
Games	Gold	Silver	Bronze
2002 Salt Lake City	Isabelle Blanc; France	Karine Ruby; France	Lidia Trettel; Italy
2006 Turin	Daniela Meuli; Switzerland	Amelie Kober; Germany	Rosey Fletcher; United States
2010 Vancouver	Nicolien Sauerbreij; Netherlands	Yekaterina Ilyukhina; Russia	Marion Kreiner; Austria
2014 Sochi	Patrizia Kummer; Switzerland	Tomoka Takeuchi; Japan	Alena Zavarzina; Russia
2018 Pyeongchang	Ester Ledecká; Czech Republic	Selina Jörg; Germany	Ramona Theresia Hofmeister; Germany
2022 Beijing	Ester Ledecká; Czech Republic	Daniela Ulbing; Austria	Glorija Kotnik; Slovenia
2026 Milano Cortina	Zuzana Maděrová; Czech Republic	Sabine Payer; Austria	Lucia Dalmasso; Italy

Medals
Rank	Nation	Gold	Silver	Bronze	Total
1	Czech Republic	3	0	0	3
2	Switzerland	2	0	0	2
3	France	1	1	0	2
4	Netherlands	1	0	0	1
5	Austria	0	2	1	3
5	Germany	0	2	1	3
7	Russia	0	1	1	2
8	Japan	0	1	0	1
9	Italy	0	0	2	2
10	Slovenia	0	0	1	1
10	United States	0	0	1	1
Total	11 nations	7	7	7	21

=== Parallel slalom (discontinued) ===
Games	Gold	Silver	Bronze
2014 Sochi	Julia Dujmovits; Austria	Anke Karstens; Germany	Amelie Kober; Germany

Medals
Rank	Nation	Gold	Silver	Bronze	Total
1	Austria	1	0	0	1
2	Germany	0	1	1	2
Total	2 nations	1	1	1	3

=== Snowboard cross ===
Games	Gold	Silver	Bronze
2006 Turin	Tanja Frieden; Switzerland	Lindsey Jacobellis; United States	Dominique Maltais; Canada
2010 Vancouver	Maëlle Ricker; Canada	Déborah Anthonioz; France	Olivia Nobs; Switzerland
2014 Sochi	Eva Samková; Czech Republic	Dominique Maltais; Canada	Chloé Trespeuch; France
2018 Pyeongchang	Michela Moioli; Italy	Julia Pereira de Sousa Mabileau; France	Eva Samková; Czech Republic
2022 Beijing	Lindsey Jacobellis; United States	Chloé Trespeuch; France	Meryeta O'Dine; Canada
2026 Milano Cortina	Josie Baff; Australia	Eva Adamczyková; Czech Republic	Michela Moioli; Italy

Medals
Rank	Nation	Gold	Silver	Bronze	Total
1	Canada	1	1	2	4
2	Czech Republic	1	1	1	2
3	United States	1	1	0	2
4	Switzerland	1	0	1	2
4	Italy	1	0	1	2
5	Australia	1	0	0	1
6	France	0	3	1	4
Total	6 nations	6	6	6	18

=== Slopestyle ===
Games	Gold	Silver	Bronze
2014 Sochi	Jamie Anderson; United States	Enni Rukajärvi; Finland	Jenny Jones; Great Britain
2018 Pyeongchang	Jamie Anderson; United States	Laurie Blouin; Canada	Enni Rukajärvi; Finland
2022 Beijing	Zoi Sadowski-Synnott; New Zealand	Julia Marino; United States	Tess Coady; Australia
2026 Milano Cortina	Mari Fukada; Japan	Zoi Sadowski-Synnott; New Zealand	Kokomo Murase; Japan

Medals
Rank	Nation	Gold	Silver	Bronze	Total
1	United States	2	1	0	3
2	New Zealand	1	1	0	2
3	Japan	1	0	1	2
4	Finland	0	1	1	2
5	Canada	0	1	0	1
6	Australia	0	0	1	1
6	Great Britain	0	0	1	1
Total	7 nations	4	4	4	12

== Mixed ==
=== Snowboard cross team ===
Games	Gold	Silver	Bronze
2022 Beijing	United States; Nick Baumgartner; Lindsey Jacobellis	Italy; Omar Visintin; Michela Moioli	Canada; Éliot Grondin; Meryeta O'Dine
2026 Milano Cortina	Great Britain; Huw Nightingale; Charlotte Bankes	Italy; Lorenzo Sommariva; Michela Moioli	France; Loan Bozzolo; Léa Casta

Medals
Rank	Nation	Gold	Silver	Bronze	Total
1	Great Britain	1	0	0	1
1	United States	1	0	0	1
2	Italy	0	2	0	2
3	Canada	0	0	1	1
3	France	0	0	1	1
Total	5 nations	2	2	2	6

== Statistics ==
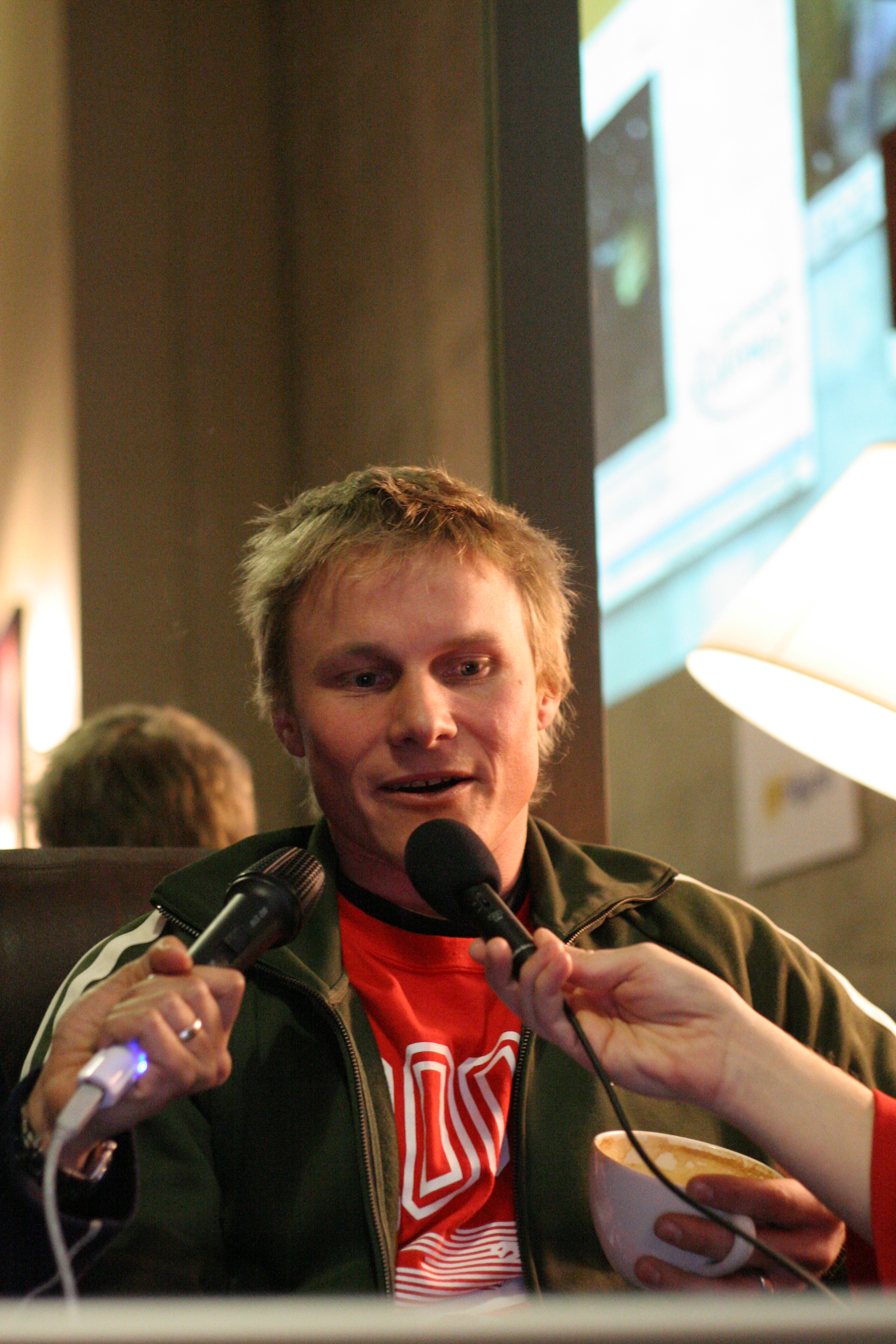
Ross Rebagliati of Canada won the first giant slalom event in 1998.

=== Athlete medal leaders ===
Athlete	Nation	Events	Olympics	Gold	Silver	Bronze	Total
Shaun White	United States	Men's halfpipe	2006–2018	3	0	0	3
Benjamin Karl	Austria	Men's parallel slalom Men's parallel giant slalom	2010–2026	2	1	1	4
Su Yiming	China	Men's big air Men's slopestyle	2022–2026	2	1	1	4
Jamie Anderson	United States	Women's slopestyle Women's big air	2014–2018	2	1	0	3
Lindsey Jacobellis	United States	Women's snowboard cross Mixed team snowboard cross	2006–2022	2	1	0	3
Chloe Kim	United States	Women's halfpipe	2018–2026	2	1	0	3
Vic Wild	Russia / ROC	Men's parallel slalom Men's parallel giant slalom	2014–2022	2	0	1	3
Zoi Sadowski-Synnott	New Zealand	Women's slopestyle Women's big air	2018–2026	1	3	1	5
Michela Moioli	Italy	Women's snowboard cross Mixed team snowboard cross	2018–2026	1	2	1	4
Ayumu Hirano	Japan	Men's halfpipe	2014–2022	1	2	0	3
Eva Adamczyková	Czech Republic	Women's snowboard cross	2014–2026	1	1	1	3
Max Parrot	Canada	Men's slopestyle Men's big air	2018–2022	1	1	1	3
Kelly Clark	United States	Women's halfpipe	2002–2018	1	0	2	3
Éliot Grondin	Canada	Men's snowboard cross Mixed team snowboard cross	2022–2026	0	2	1	3
Žan Košir	Slovenia	Men's parallel slalom Men's parallel giant slalom	2010–2018	0	1	2	3
Mark McMorris	Canada	Men's slopestyle	2014–2026	0	0	3	3
Ester Ledecká	Czech Republic	Women's parallel giant slalom	2018–2022	2	0	0	2
Philipp Schoch	Switzerland	Men's parallel giant slalom	2002–2006	2	0	0	2
Seth Wescott	United States	Men's snowboard cross	2006–2010	2	0	0	2
Pierre Vaultier	France	Men's snowboard cross	2014–2018	2	0	0	2
Karine Ruby	France	Women's giant slalom Women's parallel giant slalom	1998–2002	1	1	0	2
Hannah Teter	United States	Women's halfpipe	2006–2014	1	1	0	2
Torah Bright	Australia	Women's halfpipe	2010–2014	1	1	0	2
Nevin Galmarini	Switzerland	Men's parallel giant slalom	2010–2018	1	1	0	2
Ross Powers	United States	Men's halfpipe	1998–2002	1	0	1	2
Danny Kass	United States	Men's halfpipe	2002–2006	0	2	0	2
Scotty James	Australia	Men's halfpipe	2018–2022	0	1	1	2
Amelie Kober	Germany	Women's parallel slalom Women's parallel giant slalom	2006–2014	0	1	1	2
Dominique Maltais	Canada	Women's snowboard cross	2006–2014	0	1	1	2
Enni Rukajärvi	Finland	Women's slopestyle	2014–2018	0	1	1	2
Omar Visintin	Italy	Men's snowboard cross Mixed team snowboard cross	2014–2022	0	1	1	2
Meryeta O'Dine	Canada	Women's snowboard cross Mixed team snowboard cross	2022	0	0	2	2

=== Medals per year ===
Key

×	NOC did not exist	#	Number of medals won by the NOC	–	NOC did not win any medals

- Numbers in **bold** indicate most medals won at those Olympic Games.

Nation	24–94	98	02	06	10	14	18	22	26	Total
Australia		–	–	–	1	1	2	2	2	8
Austria		1	–	1	2	2	1	4	4	15
Bulgaria		–	–	–	–	–	–	–	1	1
Canada		1	–	1	3	2	4	**6**	1	18
China		–	–	–	–	–	1	2	2	5
Czech Republic		–	–	–	–	1	2	1	2	6
Finland		–	–	1	1	1	1	–	–	4
France		1	3	1	3	2	2	1	1	14
Germany		**2**	–	1	–	2	2	–	–	7
Great Britain		–	–	–	–	1	1	–	1	3
Italy		1	1	–	–	–	1	2	3	8
Japan		–	–	–	–	3	1	3	9	16
Netherlands		–	–	–	1	–	–	–	–	1
New Zealand		–	–	–	–	–	1	2	2	5
Norway		**2**	–	1	–	1	–	1	–	5
Russia		–	–	–	1	4	×	×	×	5
ROC		×	×	×	×	×	×	1	×	1
Slovakia		–	–	1	–	–	–	–	–	1
Slovenia		–	–	–	–	2	1	2	–	5
South Korea		–	–	–	–	–	1	–	3	4
Spain		–	–	–	–	–	1	1	–	2
Sweden		–	1	–	–	–	–	–	–	1
Switzerland		**2**	2	4	1	3	1	1	–	14
United States		**2**	**5**	**7**	**5**	**5**	**7**	4	2	37
Total	24–94	12	12	18	18	30	30	33	33	186

=== Medal sweep events ===
These are podium sweep events in which athletes from one NOC won all three medals.

Games	Event	**NOC**	Gold	Silver	Bronze
2002 Salt Lake City	Men's halfpipe	United States	Ross Powers	Danny Kass	Jarret Thomas

== See also ==
- FIS Snowboard World Championships
- X Games
