= Snowboarding at the 2006 Winter Olympics – Women's snowboard cross =

Women's snowboard cross at the XX Olympic Winter Games
- Pictogram for snowboarding
- Venue: Bardonecchia
- Date: 17 February 2006
- Competitors: 23 from 14 nations

Medalists
1st place, gold medalist(s)		Tanja Frieden	Switzerland
2nd place, silver medalist(s)		Lindsey Jacobellis	United States
3rd place, bronze medalist(s)		Dominique Maltais	Canada

The women's snowboard cross event in snowboarding at the 2006 Winter Olympics was held in Bardonecchia, a village in the Province of Turin, Italy. Competition took place on 17 February 2006.

== Medalists ==
Gold	Tanja Frieden; Switzerland
Silver	Lindsey Jacobellis; United States
Bronze	Dominique Maltais; Canada

== Results ==
=== Qualification ===
All competitors raced two qualification runs, with only the better of the two times used in the final ranking. The top 16 of the 23 competitors advanced to the quarter-finals. Struck-through runs in the table below represent the discarded time for a competitor.

Rank	Name	Nationality	Run 1 (time)	Rank	Run 2 (time)	Rank	Best time
1	Maëlle Ricker	Canada	~~1:28.99~~	1	1:27.85	1	1:27.85
2	Dominique Maltais	Canada	~~1:33.03~~	13	1:29.33	2	1:29.33
3	Lindsey Jacobellis	United States	~~1:30.89~~	6	1:29.51	3	1:29.51
4	Tanja Frieden	Switzerland	~~1:30.76~~	5	1:29.77	4	1:29.77
5	Maria Danielsson	Sweden	1:30.01	2	~~2:06.56~~	21	1:30.01
6	Isabel Clark Ribeiro	Brazil	1:30.12	3	~~1:31.49~~	10	1:30.12
7	Olivia Nobs	Switzerland	~~1:32.02~~	8	1:30.44	5	1:30.44
8	Marie Laissus	France	1:30.46	4	~~1:30.99~~	8	1:30.46
9	Déborah Anthonioz	France	~~1:31.22~~	7	1:30.89	6	1:30.89
10	Doresia Krings	Austria	~~1:45.53~~	21	1:30.90	7	1:30.90
11	Karine Ruby	France	~~1:42.51~~	20	1:31.03	9	1:31.03
12	Zoe Gillings	Great Britain	~~1:46.71~~	22	1:31.93	11	1:31.93
13	Katharina Himmler	Germany	1:32.15	9	~~1:33.89~~	17	1:32.15
14	Mellie Francon	Switzerland	~~1:32.31~~	10	1:32.30	12	1:32.30
15	Yuka Fujimori	Japan	1:32.46	11	~~1:32.63~~	13	1:32.46
16	Doris Günther	Austria	1:32.58	12	~~DNF~~		1:32.58
17	Erin Simmons	Canada	~~1:33.24~~	14	1:32.74	14	1:32.74
18	Carmen Ranigler	Italy	DNF		1:32.91	15	1:32.91
19	Dominique Vallee	Canada	~~1:34.76~~	16	1:33.57	16	1:33.57
20	Juliane Bray	New Zealand	1:34.45	15	~~1:39.81~~	20	1:34.45
21	Emily Thomas	Australia	~~1:37.69~~	19	1:34.57	18	1:34.57
22	Aleksandra Zhekova	Bulgaria	~~1:36.13~~	17	1:35.50	19	1:35.50
23	Julie Pomagalski	France	1:36.32	18	DSQ	23	1:36.32

=== Elimination round ===
The top 16 qualifiers advanced to the quarterfinal round. From here, they participated in four-person elimination races, with the top two from each race advancing.

==== Quarterfinals ====
Quarterfinal 1

Seed	Name	Rank
1	Maëlle Ricker (CAN)	1
8	Marie Laissus (FRA)	2
9	Déborah Anthonioz (FRA)	3
16	Doris Günther (AUT)	4

Quarterfinal 2

Seed	Name	Rank
4	Tanja Frieden (SUI)	1
5	Maria Danielsson (SWE)	2
13	Katharina Himmler (GER)	3
12	Zoe Gillings (GBR)	4

Quarterfinal 3

Seed	Name	Rank
14	Mellie Francon (SUI)	1
3	Lindsey Jacobellis (USA)	2
6	Isabel Clark Ribeiro (BRA)	3
11	Karine Ruby (FRA)	4

Quarterfinal 4

Seed	Name	Rank
2	Dominique Maltais (CAN)	1
15	Yuka Fujimori (JPN)	2
7	Olivia Nobs (SUI)	3
10	Doresia Krings (AUT)	4

==== Semifinals ====
Semifinal 1

Seed	Name	Rank
1	Maëlle Ricker (CAN)	1
4	Tanja Frieden (SUI)	2
5	Maria Danielsson (SWE)	3
8	Marie Laissus (FRA)	4

Semifinal 2

Seed	Name	Rank
3	Lindsey Jacobellis (USA)	1
2	Dominique Maltais (CAN)	2
14	Mellie Francon (SUI)	3
15	Yuka Fujimori (JPN)	4

==== Finals ====
The four semifinalists who failed to advanced to the big final competed in the small final to determine 5th through 8th places. The four last place finishers in the quarterfinals contested a 13th-16th classification race, while the third-placed finishers raced for 9th through 13th.

In the large final, American Lindsey Jacobellis had a clear lead heading to the final hill, where she showboated by attempting a twisting grab in the air. She fell, allowing Tanja Frieden to sweep past her and claim the gold medal.

Large Final

Seed	Name	Rank
4	Tanja Frieden (SUI)	Gold medal
3	Lindsey Jacobellis (USA)	Silver medal
2	Dominique Maltais (CAN)	Bronze medal
1	Maëlle Ricker (CAN)	4

Small Final

Seed	Name	Rank
14	Mellie Francon (SUI)	5
5	Maria Danielsson (SWE)	6
15	Yuka Fujimori (JPN)	7
8	Marie Laissus (FRA)	8

Classification 9-12

Seed	Name	Rank
6	Isabel Clark Ribeiro (BRA)	9
9	Déborah Anthonioz (FRA)	10
7	Olivia Nobs (SUI)	11
13	Katharina Himmler (GER)	12

Classification 13-16

Seed	Name	Rank
10	Doresia Krings (AUT)	13
16	Doris Günther (AUT)	14
12	Zoe Gillings (GBR)	15
11	Karine Ruby (FRA)	16
