= FIS Snowboarding World Championships 2011 – Women's snowboard cross =

The women's snowboard cross competition of the FIS Snowboarding World Championships 2011 was held at Alabaus in La Molina, Spain between January 17 and 18, 2011. 28 athletes from 17 countries competed.

The qualification round was completed on January 17, while the elimination round was completed on January 18.

== Results ==
=== Qualification ===
Rank	Bib	Name	Country	Run 1	Rank	Run 2	Rank	Best	Diff	Notes
1	27	Nelly Moenne Loccoz	France	58:39	2	57:83	1	57:83		Q
2	22	Lindsey Jacobellis	United States	58:25	1	58:28	3	58:25	0.42	Q
3	30	Déborah Anthonioz	France	58:61	4	58:26	2	58:26	0.43	Q
4	21	Eva Samkova	Czech Republic	58:53	3	59:28	5	58:53	0.70	Q
5	20	Maëlle Ricker	Canada	58:66	5	DSQ	-	58:66	0.83	Q
6	25	Claire Chapotot	France	1:00:59	11	59:19	4	59:19	1.36	Q
7	19	Dominique Maltais	Canada	1:00:11	8	59:75	6	59:75	1.92	Q
8	31	Emilie Aubrey	Italy	59:84	7	59:77	7	59:77	1.94	Q
9	28	Alexandra Jekova	Bulgaria	1:01:29	15	59:80	8	59:80	1.97	Q
10	35	Klara Koukalova	Czech Republic	59:80	6	1:09:64	20	59:80	1.97	Q
11	32	Zoe Gillings	United Kingdom	1:00:26	9	59:95	9	59:95	2.12	Q
12	18	Susanne Moll	Austria	1:04:53	20	1:00:21	10	1:00:21	2.38	Q
13	23	Maria Ramberger	Austria	1:01:11	14	1:00:34	11	1:00:34	2.51	Q
14	34	Bell Berghuis	Netherlands	1:00:53	10	DNF	-	1:00:53	2.70	Q
15	17	Yuka Fujimora	Japan	1:02:03	17	1:00:61	12	1:00:61	2.78	Q
16	24	Raffaela Brutto	Italy	1:00:79	12	1:00:87	13	1:00:79	2.96	Q
17	29	Faye Gulini	United States	1:00:80	13	1:26:54	22	1:00:80	2.97	
18	36	Isabel Clark Ribeiro	Brazil	1:02:02	16	1:02:25	14	1:02:02	4.19	
19	33	Julie Lundholdt	Denmark	1:03:47	18	1:02:44	15	1:02:44	4.61	
20	37	Kadri Pihla	Estonia	1:04:37	19	1:05:81	16	1:04:37	6.54	
21	43	Zuzanna Smykala	Poland	1:05:85	21	1:33:46	24	1:05:85	8.02	
22	42	Martina Krejcova	Czech Republic	1:06:74	22	1:22:86	21	1:06:74	8.91	
23	39	Anastasia Asanova	Russia	1:07:11	23	1:07:50	17	1:07:11	9.28	
24	38	Katerina Chournova	Czech Republic	DNF		1:07:63	18	1:07:63	9.80	
25	44	Olga Chebotareva	Russia	1:11:98	25	1:08:01	19	1:08:01	10.18	
26	26	Callan Chythlook-Sifsof	United States	1:09:95	24	DSQ		1:09:95	12.12	
27	40	Anna Amor	Spain	1:24:09	26	DNF		1:24:09	26.26	
	41	Maria Belykh	Russia	DNS		DNS				

=== Elimination round ===
==== Quarterfinals ====
The top 16 qualifiers advanced to the quarterfinals round. From here, they participated in four-person elimination races, with the top two from each race advancing.

Quarterfinal 1

Rank	Bib	Name	Country	Notes
1	1	Nelly Moenne Loccoz	France	Q
2	16	Raffaela Brutto	Italy	Q
3	8	Emilie Aubrey	Italy	
4	9	Alexandra Jekova	Bulgaria	

Quarterfinal 3

Rank	Bib	Name	Country	Notes
1	6	Claire Chapotot	France	Q
2	11	Zoe Gillings	United Kingdom	Q
3	14	Bell Berghuis	Netherlands	
4	3	Déborah Anthonioz	France	

Quarterfinal 2

Rank	Bib	Name	Country	Notes
1	5	Maëlle Ricker	Canada	Q
2	4	Eva Samkova	Czech Republic	Q
3	12	Susanne Moll	Austria	
4	13	Maria Ramberger	Austria	

Quarterfinal 4

Rank	Bib	Name	Country	Notes
1	2	Lindsey Jacobellis	United States	Q
2	7	Dominique Maltais	Canada	Q
3	15	Yuka Fujimora	Japan	
4	10	Klara Koukalova	Czech Republic	

==== Semifinals ====
Semifinal 1

Rank	Bib	Name	Country	Notes
1	5	Maëlle Ricker	Canada	Q
2	1	Nelly Moenne Loccoz	France	Q
3	4	Eva Samkova	Czech Republic	
4	16	Raffaela Brutto	Italy	

Semifinal 2

Rank	Bib	Name	Country	Notes
1	2	Lindsey Jacobellis	United States	Q
2	7	Dominique Maltais	Canada	Q
3	6	Claire Chapotot	France	
4	11	Zoe Gillings	United Kingdom	

==== Finals ====
Small final

Rank	Bib	Name	Country	Notes
5	4	Eva Samkova	Czech Republic	
6	6	Claire Chapotot	France	
7	11	Zoe Gillings	United Kingdom	
8	16	Raffaela Brutto	Italy	

Large final

Rank	Bib	Name	Country	Notes
1st place, gold medalist(s)	2	Lindsey Jacobellis	United States	
2nd place, silver medalist(s)	1	Nelly Moenne Loccoz	France	
3rd place, bronze medalist(s)	7	Dominique Maltais	Canada	
4	5	Maëlle Ricker	Canada	
