= Snowboarding at the 2010 Winter Olympics – Women's snowboard cross =

Women's snowboard cross at the XXI Olympic Winter Games
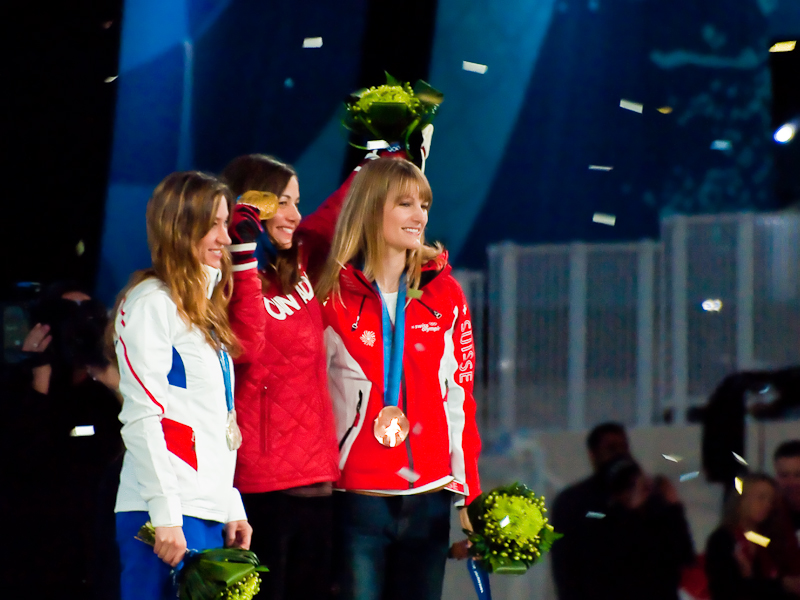
- The medalists
- Venue: Cypress Mountain
- Date: February 16, 2010
- Competitors: 24 from 13 nations

Medalists
1st place, gold medalist(s)		Maëlle Ricker	Canada
2nd place, silver medalist(s)		Déborah Anthonioz	France
3rd place, bronze medalist(s)		Olivia Nobs	Switzerland

The women's snowboard cross competition of the Vancouver 2010 Olympics was held at Cypress Mountain on February 16, 2010.

== Results ==
=== Qualification ===
Rank	Bib	Name	Country	Run 1	Run 2	Best	Notes
1	27	Mellie Francon	Switzerland	1:24.43	1:24.79	1:24.43	Q
2	22	Lindsey Jacobellis	United States	1:26.13	1:25.41	1:25.41	Q
3	20	Maëlle Ricker	Canada	1:43.59	1:25.45	1:25.45	Q
4	30	Olivia Nobs	Switzerland	1:28.70	1:26.25	1:26.25	Q
5	25	Helene Olafsen	Norway	1:40.43	1:26.94	1:26.94	Q
6	31	Nelly Moenne Loccoz	France	1:27.31	1:42.92	1:27.31	Q
7	28	Déborah Anthonioz	France	1:27.61	1:27.49	1:27.49	Q
8	19	Zoe Gillings	Great Britain	1:27.93	DNF	1:27.93	Q
9	32	Simona Meiler	Switzerland	1:45.16	1:27.94	1:27.94	Q
10	36	Doresia Krings	Austria	1:36.55	1:28.98	1:28.98	Q
11	17	Sandra Frei	Switzerland	1:29.46	1:43.38	1:29.46	Q
12	23	Faye Gulini	United States	1:30.75	1:43.29	1:30.75	Q
13	37	Claire Chapotot	France	DNF	1:30.89	1:30.89	Q
14	33	Natsuko Doi	Japan	1:31.23	DNF	1:31.23	Q
15	39	Julie Wendel Lundholdt	Denmark	1:31.29	1:44.62	1:31.29	Q
16	35	Maria Ramberger	Austria	1:43.54	1:33.08	1:33.08	Q
17	26	Raffaella Brutto	Italy	1:34.12	1:37.94	1:34.12	
18	34	Stephanie Hickey	Australia	1:35.26	DNF	1:35.26	
19	29	Isabel Clark Ribeiro	Brazil	1:41.10	1:51.65	1:41.10	
20	21	Dominique Maltais	Canada	DSQ	1:45.56	1:45.56	
21	40	Callan Chythlook-Sifsof	United States	1:59.04	DNF	1:59.04	
	18	Aleksandra Zhekova	Bulgaria	DNF	DNS		
	24	Yuka Fujimori	Japan	DNS	DNS		
	38	Manuela Riegler	Austria	DNS	DNS		

=== Elimination round ===
==== Quarterfinals ====
The top 16 qualifiers advanced to the quarterfinals round. From here, they participated in four-person elimination races, with the top two from each race advancing.

Quarterfinal 1

Rank	Bib	Name	Country	Notes
1	1	Mellie Francon	Switzerland	Q
2	8	Zoe Gillings	Great Britain	Q
3	9	Simona Meiler	Switzerland	
4	16	Maria Ramberger	Austria	

Quarterfinal 3

Rank	Bib	Name	Country	Notes
1	3	Maëlle Ricker	Canada	Q
2	6	Nelly Moenne Loccoz	France	Q
3	14	Natsuko Doi	Japan	
4	11	Sandra Frei	Switzerland	

Quarterfinal 2

Rank	Bib	Name	Country	Notes
1	4	Olivia Nobs	Switzerland	Q
2	5	Helene Olafsen	Norway	Q
3	12	Faye Gulini	United States	
4	13	Claire Chapotot	France	

Quarterfinal 4

Rank	Bib	Name	Country	Notes
1	2	Lindsey Jacobellis	United States	Q
2	7	Déborah Anthonioz	France	Q
3	10	Doresia Krings	Austria	
4	15	Julie Wendel Lundholdt	Denmark	

==== Semifinals ====
Semifinal 1

Rank	Bib	Name	Country	Notes
1	5	Helene Olafsen	Norway	Q
2	4	Olivia Nobs	Switzerland	Q
3	8	Zoe Gillings	Great Britain	
4	1	Mellie Francon	Switzerland	

Semifinal 2

Rank	Bib	Name	Country	Notes
1	3	Maëlle Ricker	Canada	Q
2	7	Déborah Anthonioz	France	Q
3	6	Nelly Moenne Loccoz	France	
4	2	Lindsey Jacobellis	United States	

==== Finals ====
Small Final

Rank	Bib	Name	Country
5	2	Lindsey Jacobellis	United States
6	6	Nelly Moenne Loccoz	France
7	1	Mellie Francon	Switzerland
8	8	Zoe Gillings	Great Britain

Large Final

Rank	Bib	Name	Country
1st place, gold medalist(s)	3	Maëlle Ricker	Canada
2nd place, silver medalist(s)	7	Déborah Anthonioz	France
3rd place, bronze medalist(s)	4	Olivia Nobs	Switzerland
4	5	Helene Olafsen	Norway

=== Final Classification ===
Rank	Seed	Bib	Name	Country	Notes
1st place, gold medalist(s)	3	20	Maëlle Ricker	Canada	
2nd place, silver medalist(s)	7	28	Déborah Anthonioz	France	
3rd place, bronze medalist(s)	4	30	Olivia Nobs	Switzerland	
4	5	25	Helene Olafsen	Norway	
5	2	22	Lindsey Jacobellis	United States	
6	6	31	Nelly Moenne Loccoz	France	
7	1	27	Mellie Francon	Switzerland	
8	8	19	Zoe Gillings	Great Britain	
9	9	32	Simona Meiler	Switzerland	
10	10	36	Doresia Krings	Austria	
11	11	17	Sandra Frei	Switzerland	
12	12	23	Faye Gulini	United States	
13	13	37	Claire Chapotot	France	
14	14	33	Natsuko Doi	Japan	
15	15	39	Julie Wendel Lundholdt	Denmark	
16	16	35	Maria Ramberger	Austria	
17	17	26	Raffaella Brutto	Italy	
18	18	34	Stephanie Hickey	Australia	
19	19	29	Isabel Clark Ribeiro	Brazil	
20	20	21	Dominique Maltais	Canada	
21	21	40	Callan Chythlook-Sifsof	United States	
		18	Aleksandra Zhekova	Bulgaria	
		24	Yuka Fujimori	Japan	DNS
		38	Manuela Riegler	Austria	DNS
