= Snowboarding at the Winter Olympics =

- IOC Code: SBD
- Governing body: FIS
- Events: 11 (men: 5; women: 5; mixed: 1)

Winter Olympics
- 1924; 1928; 1932; 1936; 1948; 1952; 1956; 1960; 1964; 1968; 1972; 1976; 1980; 1984; 1988; 1992; 1994; 1998; 2002; 2006; 2010; 2014; 2018; 2022; 2026
- Medalists

Snowboarding is a sport at the Winter Olympic Games. It was first included in the 1998 Winter Olympics in Nagano, Japan. Snowboarding was one of five new sports or disciplines added to the Winter Olympic program between 1992 and 2002, and was the only one not to have been a previous medal or demonstration event. In 1998, four events, two for men and two for women, were held in two specialities: the Giant slalom, a downhill event similar to giant slalom skiing; and the half-pipe, in which competitors perform tricks while going from one side of a semi-circular ditch to the other. Canadian Ross Rebagliati won the men's giant slalom and became the first athlete to win a gold medal in snowboarding. Rebagliati was briefly stripped of his medal by the International Olympic Committee (IOC) after testing positive for marijuana. However, the IOC's decision was reverted following an appeal from the Canadian Olympic Association. For the 2002 Winter Olympics, giant slalom was expanded to add head-to-head racing and was renamed Parallel giant slalom. In 2006, a third event, the snowboard cross, was held for the first time. In this event, competitors race against each other down a course with jumps, beams and other obstacles. On July 11, 2011, the International Olympic Committee's Executive Board approved the addition of Ski and Snowboard Slopestyle to the Winter Olympics roster of events, effective in 2014. The decision was announced via press conference from the IOC's meeting in Durban, South Africa. A fifth event, parallel slalom, was added only for 2014. Big air was added for 2018. Mixed team snowboard cross was added in 2022.

New Zealander Zoi Sadowski-Synnott is the most decorated snowboarder in Olympic history with 5 Olympic medals. Three athletes have won four medals: Austrian Benjamin Karl, Italian Michela Moioli, and Chinese Su Yiming. Twelve athletes have won three medals: Americans Shaun White, Jamie Anderson, Lindsey Jacobellis, Chloe Kim and Kelly Clark; Canadians Éliot Grondin, Max Parrot and Mark McMorris; Czech Eva Adamczyková, Japanese Ayumu Hirano, Slovenian Žan Košir, and Russian Vic Wild.

== Summary ==
| Games | Year | Events | Best Nation |
|---|---|---|---|
| 1 → 17 | | | |
| 18 | 1998 | 4 | Germany (1) |
| 19 | 2002 | 4 | United States (1) |
| 20 | 2006 | 6 | United States (2) |
| 21 | 2010 | 6 | United States (3) |
| 22 | 2014 | 10 | United States (4) |
| 23 | 2018 | 10 | United States (5) |
| 24 | 2022 | 11 | Austria (1); United States (6) |
| 25 | 2026 | 11 | Japan (1) |

== Events ==
=== Men's ===
| Event | 24 | 28 | 32 | 36 | 48 | 52 | 56 | 60 | 64 | 68 | 72 | 76 | 80 | 84 | 88 | 92 | 94 | 98 | 02 | 06 | 10 | 14 | 18 | 22 | 26 | Years |
|---|---|---|---|---|---|---|---|---|---|---|---|---|---|---|---|---|---|---|---|---|---|---|---|---|---|---|
| Parallel giant slalom ^{Note 1} | | | | | | | | | | | | | | | | | | • | • | • | • | • | • | • | • | 8 |
| half-pipe | | | | | | | | | | | | | | | | | | • | • | • | • | • | • | • | • | 8 |
| snowboard cross | | | | | | | | | | | | | | | | | | | | • | • | • | • | • | • | 6 |
| slopestyle | | | | | | | | | | | | | | | | | | | | | | • | • | • | • | 4 |
| big air | | | | | | | | | | | | | | | | | | | | | | | • | • | • | 3 |
| Parallel slalom | | | | | | | | | | | | | | | | | | | | | | • | | | | 1 |
| Total events | | | | | | | | | | | | | | | | | | 2 | 2 | 3 | 3 | 5 | 5 | 5 | 5 | |

=== Women's ===
| Event | 24 | 28 | 32 | 36 | 48 | 52 | 56 | 60 | 64 | 68 | 72 | 76 | 80 | 84 | 88 | 92 | 94 | 98 | 02 | 06 | 10 | 14 | 18 | 22 | 26 | Years |
|---|---|---|---|---|---|---|---|---|---|---|---|---|---|---|---|---|---|---|---|---|---|---|---|---|---|---|
| Parallel giant slalom ^{Note 1} | | | | | | | | | | | | | | | | | | • | • | • | • | • | • | • | • | 8 |
| half-pipe | | | | | | | | | | | | | | | | | | • | • | • | • | • | • | • | • | 8 |
| snowboard cross | | | | | | | | | | | | | | | | | | | | • | • | • | • | • | • | 6 |
| slopestyle | | | | | | | | | | | | | | | | | | | | | | • | • | • | • | 4 |
| big air | | | | | | | | | | | | | | | | | | | | | | | • | • | • | 3 |
| Parallel slalom | | | | | | | | | | | | | | | | | | | | | | • | | | | 1 |
| Total events | | | | | | | | | | | | | | | | | | 2 | 2 | 3 | 3 | 5 | 5 | 5 | 5 | |

=== Mixed ===
| Event | 24 | 28 | 32 | 36 | 48 | 52 | 56 | 60 | 64 | 68 | 72 | 76 | 80 | 84 | 88 | 92 | 94 | 98 | 02 | 06 | 10 | 14 | 18 | 22 | 26 | Years |
|---|---|---|---|---|---|---|---|---|---|---|---|---|---|---|---|---|---|---|---|---|---|---|---|---|---|---|
| snowboard cross, team | | | | | | | | | | | | | | | | | | | | | | | | • | • | 2 |
| Total events | | | | | | | | | | | | | | | | | | | | | | | | 1 | 1 | |

Note 1. Giant slalom in 1998; parallel giant slalom since 2002.

== Medal table ==
Sources (after the 2026 Winter Olympics):
Accurate as of 2026 Winter Olympics.

| Rank | Nation | Gold | Silver | Bronze | Total |
|---|---|---|---|---|---|
| 1 | United States | 17 | 9 | 11 | 37 |
| 2 | Switzerland | 8 | 2 | 4 | 14 |
| 3 | Austria | 7 | 3 | 5 | 15 |
| 4 | Canada | 5 | 6 | 7 | 18 |
| 5 | Japan | 5 | 5 | 6 | 16 |
| 6 | France | 4 | 5 | 5 | 14 |
| 7 | Czech Republic | 4 | 1 | 1 | 6 |
| 8 | Australia | 2 | 4 | 2 | 8 |
| 9 | China | 2 | 2 | 1 | 5 |
| 9 | Russia | 2 | 2 | 1 | 5 |
| 11 | Germany | 1 | 4 | 2 | 7 |
| 12 | Italy | 1 | 3 | 4 | 8 |
| 13 | New Zealand | 1 | 3 | 1 | 5 |
| 14 | South Korea | 1 | 2 | 1 | 4 |
| 15 | Great Britain | 1 | 0 | 2 | 3 |
| 16 | Netherlands | 1 | 0 | 0 | 1 |
| 17 | Norway | 0 | 4 | 1 | 5 |
| 18 | Slovenia | 0 | 2 | 3 | 5 |
| 19 | Finland | 0 | 2 | 2 | 4 |
| 20 | Spain | 0 | 1 | 1 | 2 |
| 21 | Slovakia | 0 | 1 | 0 | 1 |
| 21 | Sweden | 0 | 1 | 0 | 1 |
| 23 | Bulgaria | 0 | 0 | 1 | 1 |
| 23 | ROC | 0 | 0 | 1 | 1 |
| Totals (24 entries) | | 62 | 62 | 62 | 186 |

== Number of athletes by nation ==
| Nation | 24 | 28 | 32 | 36 | 48 | 52 | 56 | 60 | 64 | 68 | 72 | 76 | 80 | 84 | 88 | 92 | 94 | 98 | 02 | 06 | 10 | 14 | 18 | 22 | 26 | Years |
|---|---|---|---|---|---|---|---|---|---|---|---|---|---|---|---|---|---|---|---|---|---|---|---|---|---|---|
| Andorra | | | | | | | | | | | | | | | | | | | | | 1 | 1 | 1 | 1 | | 4 |
| Argentina | | | | | | | | | | | | | | | | | | 1 | | | | | 2 | | | 2 |
| Australia | | | | | | | | | | | | | | | | | | 1 | 1 | 9 | 8 | 11 | 11 | 11 | | 7 |
| Austria | | | | | | | | | | | | | | | | | | 11 | 9 | 12 | 13 | 17 | 14 | 13 | | 7 |
| Belgium | | | | | | | | | | | | | | | | | | | | | | 1 | 3 | 1 | | 3 |
| Brazil | | | | | | | | | | | | | | | | | | | | 1 | 1 | 1 | 1 | | | 4 |
| Bulgaria | | | | | | | | | | | | | | | | | | 1 | | 1 | 2 | 2 | 3 | 1 | | 6 |
| Canada | | | | | | | | | | | | | | | | | | 12 | 9 | 16 | 18 | 24 | 21 | 23 | | 7 |
| China | | | | | | | | | | | | | | | | | | | | 2 | 5 | 6 | 9 | 14 | | 5 |
| Croatia | | | | | | | | | | | | | | | | | | | | | | 1 | | 1 | | 2 |
| Czech Republic | | | | | | | | | | | | | | | | | | | | 3 | 5 | 5 | 7 | 5 | | 5 |
| Denmark | | | | | | | | | | | | | | | | | | 1 | | | 1 | | | | | 2 |
| Finland | | | | | | | | | | | | | | | | | | 6 | 7 | 5 | 5 | 11 | 8 | 4 | | 7 |
| France | | | | | | | | | | | | | | | | | | 13 | 12 | 16 | 17 | 13 | 13 | 9 | | 7 |
| Germany | | | | | | | | | | | | | | | | | | 8 | 9 | 11 | 8 | 10 | 13 | 15 | | 7 |
| Great Britain | | | | | | | | | | | | | | | | | | | 1 | 4 | 4 | 7 | 5 | 3 | | 6 |
| Greece | | | | | | | | | | | | | | | | | | 3 | | | | | | | | 1 |
| Hungary | | | | | | | | | | | | | | | | | | | | | | | | 1 | | 1 |
| Ireland | | | | | | | | | | | | | | | | | | | | | | 1 | 1 | 1 | | 3 |
| Italy | | | | | | | | | | | | | | | | | | 9 | 10 | 16 | 11 | 12 | 12 | 17 | | 7 |
| Japan | | | | | | | | | | | | | | | | | | 7 | 9 | 12 | 11 | 8 | 16 | 19 | | 7 |
| Kazakhstan | | | | | | | | | | | | | | | | | | | | | | 1 | | | | 1 |
| Malta | | | | | | | | | | | | | | | | | | | | | | | | 1 | | 1 |
| Netherlands | | | | | | | | | | | | | | | | | | 1 | 1 | 2 | 2 | 6 | 3 | 4 | | 7 |
| New Zealand | | | | | | | | | | | | | | | | | | 1 | | 3 | 5 | 5 | 4 | 3 | | 6 |
| Norway | | | | | | | | | | | | | | | | | | 7 | 6 | 4 | 9 | 9 | 5 | 4 | | 7 |
| Poland | | | | | | | | | | | | | | | | | | 3 | 2 | 6 | 4 | 6 | 6 | 5 | | 7 |
| Russia | | | | | | | | | | | | | | | | | | | 1 | 8 | 6 | 15 | 16 | 15 | | 6 |
| Serbia | | | | | | | | | | | | | | | | | | | | | | 1 | | | | 1 |
| Slovakia | | | | | | | | | | | | | | | | | | 1 | 1 | 1 | | | 1 | 1 | | 5 |
| Slovenia | | | | | | | | | | | | | | | | | | 1 | 2 | 4 | 7 | 10 | 7 | 6 | | 7 |
| South Korea | | | | | | | | | | | | | | | | | | | | | 1 | 4 | 10 | 5 | | 4 |
| Spain | | | | | | | | | | | | | | | | | | 2 | 1 | 5 | 4 | 4 | 4 | 2 | | 7 |
| Sweden | | | | | | | | | | | | | | | | | | 10 | 11 | 13 | 1 | 2 | 2 | 2 | | 7 |
| Switzerland | | | | | | | | | | | | | | | | | | 12 | 12 | 16 | 16 | 24 | 24 | 19 | | 7 |
| Ukraine | | | | | | | | | | | | | | | | | | | | | 2 | 2 | 1 | 1 | | 4 |
| United States | | | | | | | | | | | | | | | | | | 14 | 14 | 16 | 18 | 23 | 25 | 26 | | 7 |
| Nations | - | - | - | - | - | - | - | - | - | - | - | - | - | - | - | - | - | 22 | 19 | 24 | 27 | 31 | 30 | 31 | | |
| Athletes | - | - | - | - | - | - | - | - | - | - | - | - | - | - | - | - | - | 125 | 118 | 187 | 185 | 243 | 248 | 233 | | |
| Year | 24 | 28 | 32 | 36 | 48 | 52 | 56 | 60 | 64 | 68 | 72 | 76 | 80 | 84 | 88 | 92 | 94 | 98 | 02 | 06 | 10 | 14 | 18 | 22 | 26 | |

== See also ==
- List of Olympic venues in snowboarding
- Skateboarding at the Summer Olympics
- Snowboarding at the Asian Winter Games
- Snowboarding at the Winter World University Games
- Surfing at the Summer Olympics
