= Olivia Nobs =

Swiss snowboarder (born 1982)

Olivia Nobs (born 18 November 1982, La Chaux-de-Fonds) is a Swiss former snowboard cross athlete who represented Switzerland at the 2006 and 2010 Winter Olympics, where she won the bronze medal in women’s snowboard cross; she also earned a silver medal at the 2009 FIS Snowboard World Championships and achieved three FIS World Cup victories during her competitive career.

== Early life ==
Olivia Nobs
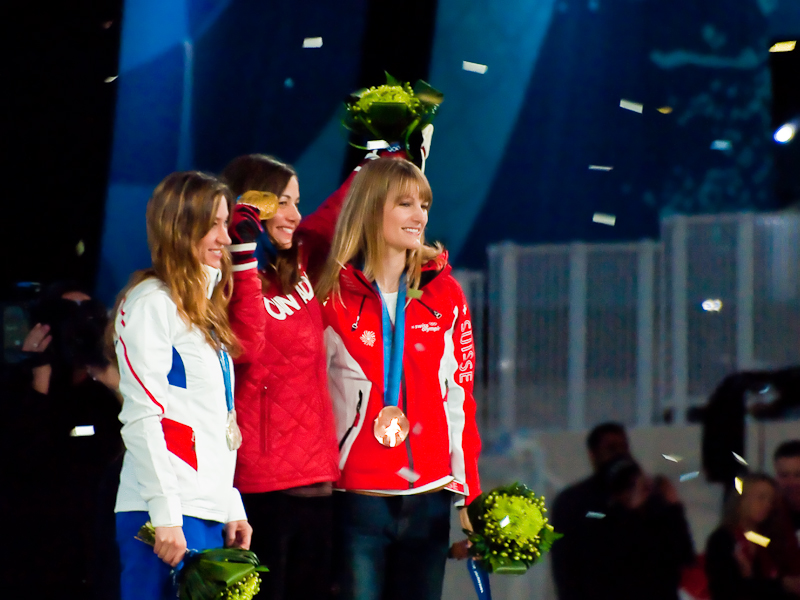
- Déborah Anthonioz, Maëlle Ricker and Olivia Nobs after receiving their medals at the 2010 Winter Olympics

Personal information
- Born: 18 November 1982 (age 43) La Chaux-de-Fonds, Switzerland
Medal record
Women's snowboarding
Representing Switzerland
Olympic Games
Bronze medal – third place	2010 Vancouver	Snowboard cross
World Championships
Silver medal – second place	2009 Gangwon	Snowboard cross

Olivia Nobs was born on 18 November 1982 in La Chaux-de-Fonds, in the canton of Neuchâtel, Switzerland.

Olivia Nobs graduated from school with the Baccalauréat en Langue Moderne and became a professional athlete in 2001.

== Career ==
Olivia Nobs started her international career in 2001 in FIS Snowboard cross in Tignes where she took the 5th place.

=== FIS Snowboard World Cups ===
For her first year in international competition, Nobs achieved an overall 5th place at the world cup standings thanks to mostly her 5th position in Tignes (17 November 2001), 1st position at Bardonecchia (18 January 2002), 5th position in Kreischberg (26 January 2002) and 3rd position in Bad Gastein. She confirmed her results in the season 2002-2003 with an overall 2nd place. Except 2006, when she ranked 4th, Nobs ranked overall between 10th and 22nd until the end of her professional Snowboard cross career in 2010.

Best individual results:

Date	Place	Country	Sport	Ranking
18. January 2002	Bardonecchia	Italy	Snowboardcross	1
25. January 2003	Berchtesgaden	Germany	Snowboardcross	1
5. February 2003	Bad Gastein	Austria	Snowboardcross	2
16. March 2003	Arosa	Switzerland	Snowboardcross	1
4. January 2006	Bad Gastein	Austria	Snowboardcross	2
13. February 2009	Cypress	Canada	Snowboardcross	2

=== FIS Snowboard cross World Championships ===
Nobs captured the silver medal in snowboard cross at the FIS Snowboarding World Championships 2009 in South Korea.

=== Winter Olympics ===
Olivia Nobs qualified for the Swiss team in Women's Snowboard cross for the 2006 Winter Olympics in Turin, along with Tanja Frieden and Mellie Francon. Olivia Nobs achieved the 11th place.

At the 2010 Vancouver Winter Olympics, Nobs took the bronze medal in the Women's Snowboard Cross.

She ended her Snowboard career in November 2010 and is now practicing as a certified naturopath in Sierre.
