= Snowboarding at the 2010 Winter Olympics =

Snowboarding at the XXI Olympic Winter Games
- Pictograms for Snowboarding
- Venue: Cypress Mountain
- Dates: February 15–27, 2010
- No. of events: 6
- Competitors: 188 from 27 nations

The snowboarding competition of the Vancouver 2010 Olympics was held at Cypress Mountain. The events were held between the 15 and 27 February 2010.

== Medal summary ==
=== Medal table ===
Rank	Nation	Gold	Silver	Bronze	Total
1	United States	2	1	2	5
2	Canada	2	1	0	3
3	Australia	1	0	0	1
3	Netherlands	1	0	0	1
5	France	0	1	2	3
6	Austria	0	1	1	2
7	Finland	0	1	0	1
7	Russia	0	1	0	1
9	Switzerland	0	0	1	1
Totals (9 entries)		6	6	6	18

=== Men's events ===
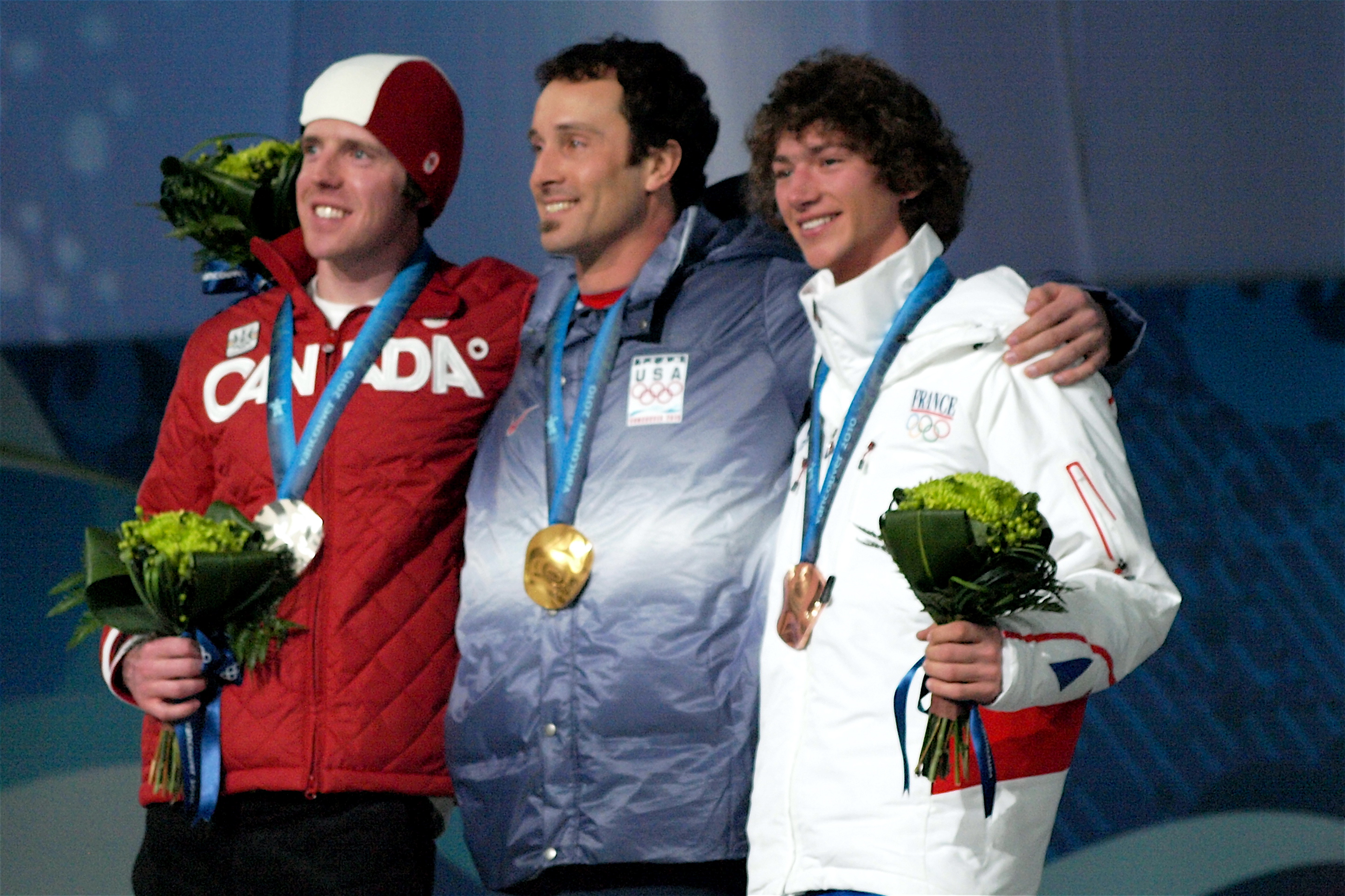
The medalists from the Snowboard cross. From left: Mike Robertson (silver), Seth Wescott (gold), Tony Ramoin (bronze)

Event	Gold		Silver		Bronze	
Halfpipe	Shaun White; United States	48.4	Peetu Piiroinen; Finland	45.0	Scott Lago; United States	42.8
Parallel giant slalom	Jasey-Jay Anderson; Canada		Benjamin Karl; Austria		Mathieu Bozzetto; France	
Snowboard cross	Seth Wescott; United States		Mike Robertson; Canada		Tony Ramoin; France	

=== Women's events ===
Event	Gold		Silver		Bronze	
Halfpipe	Torah Bright; Australia	45.0	Hannah Teter; United States	42.4	Kelly Clark; United States	42.2
Parallel giant slalom	Nicolien Sauerbreij; Netherlands		Ekaterina Ilyukhina; Russia		Marion Kreiner; Austria	
Snowboard cross	Maëlle Ricker; Canada		Déborah Anthonioz; France		Olivia Nobs; Switzerland	

== Competition schedule ==
All times are Pacific Standard Time (UTC-8).

Day	Date	Start	Finish	Event	Phase
Day 4	Monday, 2010-02-15	10:30	12:50	Snowboard Cross Men	Qualification
Day 4	Monday, 2010-02-15	14:00	15:00	Snowboard Cross Men	Finals
Day 5	Tuesday, 2010-02-16	10:00	11:40	Snowboard Cross Women	Qualification
Day 5	Tuesday, 2010-02-16	12:15	12:50	Snowboard Cross Women	Finals
Day 6	Wednesday, 2010-02-17	13:05	15:45	Halfpipe Men	Qualification
Day 6	Wednesday, 2010-02-17	17:15	18:15	Halfpipe Men	Qualification
Day 6	Wednesday, 2010-02-17	19:15	20:15	Halfpipe Men	Finals
Day 7	Thursday, 2010-02-18	12:30	14:05	Halfpipe Women	Qualification
Day 7	Thursday, 2010-02-18	16:00	17:00	Halfpipe Women	Qualification
Day 7	Thursday, 2010-02-18	18:00	19:00	Halfpipe Women	Finals
Day 15	Friday, 2010-02-26	10:00	11:00	Parallel Giant Slalom Women	Qualification
Day 15	Friday, 2010-02-26	12:15	13:45	Parallel Giant Slalom Women	Finals
Day 16	Saturday, 2010-02-27	10:00	11:00	Parallel Giant Slalom Men	Qualification
Day 16	Saturday, 2010-02-27	12:15	13:45	Parallel Giant Slalom Men	Finals

== Qualification ==
For the six events, there are a maximum 190 athletes allowed to compete. This includes a maximum of 30 in parallel giant slalom, 40 in halfpipe, and 40 in snowboard cross for men and 25 in parallel giant slalom, 30 in halfpipe, and 25 in snowboard cross for women. No nation can have more than 18 snowboarders with maximum of ten men or ten women per specific nation. For each event, no nation can enter four skiers per individual event.

Skiers are qualified if they have placed in the top 30 in an FIS World Cup event of FIS World Championships in the event concerned. A minimum of 100 FIS points in the respective event. Host nation Canada is expected to enter a skier in all events. If no skier meets the qualification standards, they can enter one skier per event.

Quota allocation will be given using the World Ranking List (WRL) for the twelve-month period of World Cup Standings from the 2008–09 and 2009-10 Snowboard World Cup and the FIS Freestyle World Ski Championships 2009. It will be assigned one slot per skier from the top the WRL downwards. When a nation has the maximum four skiers per event, the next eligible nation on the WRL will be given a slot until the maximum total per event in moguls, aerials, and ski cross per gender has been reached.

In the case any nation is given more than 18 skiers, it is up the nation to select the team of a maximum of 18 skiers by 25 January 2010. Once quota slots are allocated by the FIS and the national entries confirmed, a reallocation of unused slots per event will be made by the FIS to the next eligible nation on the WRL for quota allocation in the respective event and gender. This process started on 18 January 2010 and will run until 28 January 2010. Deadline to VANOC is 1 February 2010.

== Participating nations ==
Twenty-seven nations competed in the snowboarding events at Vancouver.

- Andorra (1)
- Australia (8)
- Austria (14)
- Brazil (1)
- Bulgaria (2)
- Canada (18)
- China (5)
- Czech Republic (5)
- Denmark (1)
- Finland (5)
- France (17)
- Germany (8)
- Great Britain (4)
- Italy (11)
- Japan (12)
- Netherlands (2)
- New Zealand (5)
- Norway (10)
- Poland (4)
- Russia (6)
- Slovenia (7)
- South Korea (1)
- Spain (4)
- Sweden (1)
- Switzerland (16)
- Ukraine (2)
- United States (18)
