= Dominique Maltais =

Canadian snowboarder (born 1980)

Personal information
- Born: 9 November 1980 (age 45) Petite-Rivière-Saint-François, Quebec
- Height: 1.80 m (5 ft 11 in)
- Website: www.instagram.com/dominiquesbx/

Skiing career
- Sport: Alpine skiing
- Disciplines: Freestyle snowboarding, Snowboard cross

Olympics
- Teams: 3 (2006–2014)
- Medals: 2 (0 gold)

World Championships
- Teams: 5 (2005, 2009–2015)
- Medals: 2 (0 gold)

World Cup
- Seasons: 10 (2004–2006, 2008-2014)
- Wins: 14
- Podiums: 37
- Overall titles: 0
- Discipline titles: 5 - Snowboard Cross (2006, 2011-2014)
Medal record
International snowboard competitions
Event	1st	2nd	3rd
Olympic Games	0	1	1
World Championships	0	1	1
Winter X Games	1	1	0
Total	1	3	2
Women's Snowboarding
Representing Canada
Olympic Games
Silver medal – second place	2014 Sochi	Snowboard cross
Bronze medal – third place	2006 Turin	Snowboard cross
FIS Snowboarding World Championships
Silver medal – second place	2013 Stoneham	Snowboard cross
Bronze medal – third place	2011 La Molina	Snowboard cross
Winter X Games
Gold medal – first place	2012 Aspen	Snowboard X
Silver medal – second place	2015 Aspen	Snowboard X

Dominique Maltais (born 9 November 1980) is a Canadian snowboarder, specialising in snowboard cross. She is a two-time Olympic medallist, winning a bronze medal at the 2006 Torino Games and a silver medal at the 2014 Sochi Games. She also competed at the 2010 Vancouver Olympics, where she failed to reach the final. At the FIS Snowboarding World Championships, she won a bronze medal in 2011 and a silver medal in 2013. She is the 2012 Winter X Games champion, and has won the Crystal Globe as the overall FIS World Cup champion in snowboard cross five times, in 2006, 2011, 2012, 2013 and 2014.

== Snowboarding career ==
Born in Petite-Rivière-Saint-François, Maltais started competing in 2002, and won the Canadian Championship in 2003 and again in 2004. Internationally, she came 5th in the World Cup during her rookie year (2003–04) with 2 podium finishes that year. In her second year (2004–05), she won the European Cup and came in 8th in the World Cup. During that World Cup she had two podium finishes, including her first gold. In the 2005 World Championships, Maltais finished 4th, letting her set her sights on an Olympic medal in Turin in 2006, the first time Snowboard Cross would be contested at the Winter Olympics.

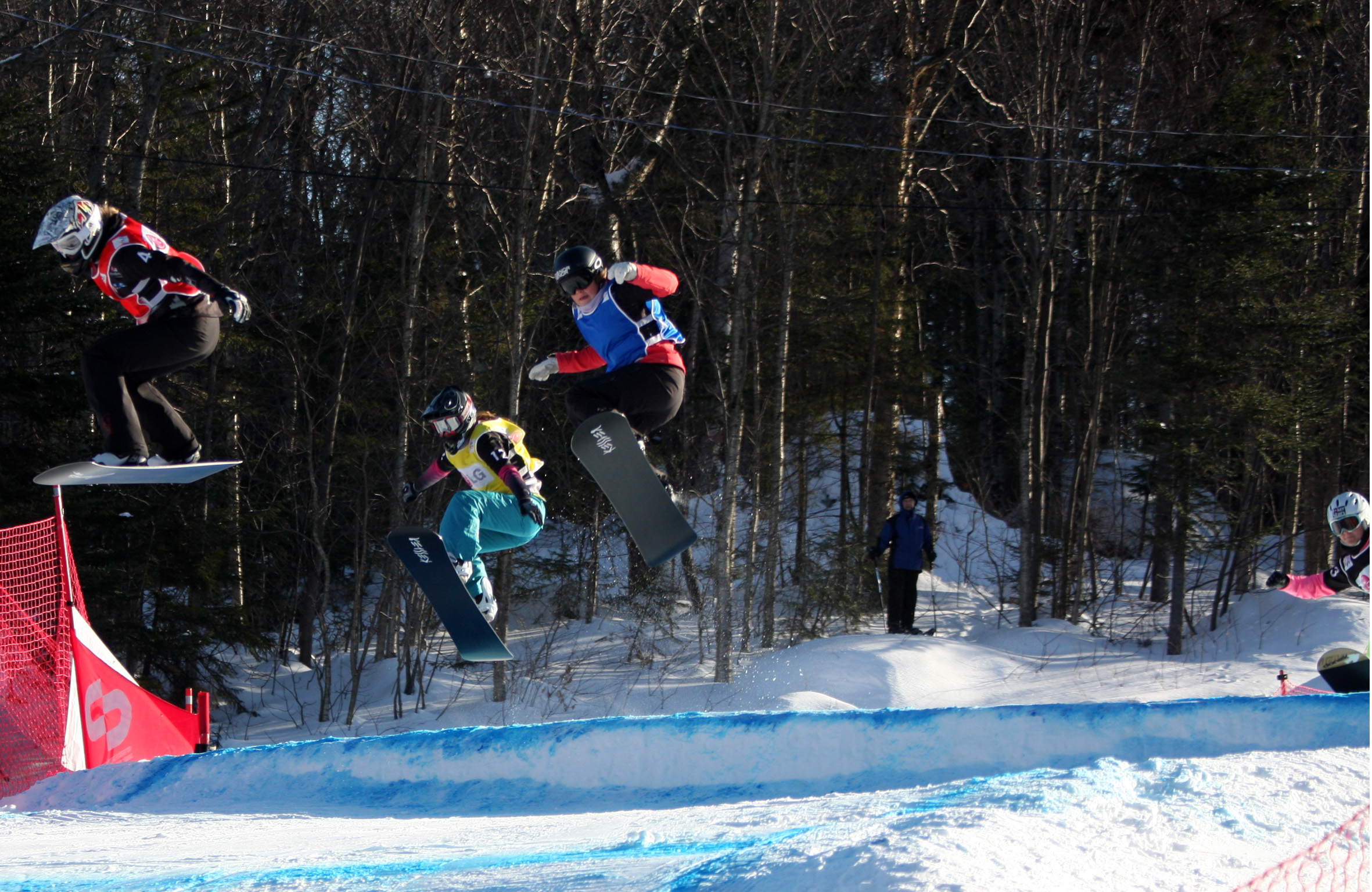
Dominique Maltais (red bib, left) leads over a jump at the 2009–10 FIS World Cup stop in Stoneham in January 2010.

In Turin, Maltais was in a final of four with fellow Canadian Maëlle Ricker. Ricker fell in the early stages, and Maltais crashed out of a corner farther down. After the other two racers (Tanja Frieden and Lindsey Jacobellis) finished, Maltais was able to get up and finish the race, earning her the bronze. Dominique had a disappointing 2010 Winter Olympics falling in both of her qualifying runs and therefore did not qualify for the finals.

Maltais followed a disappointing Olympics with a successful start to the 2010–11 FIS Snowboard World Cup leading the World Cup snowboard cross category heading into the 2011 World Snowboarding Championships. There she managed to take third place for the bronze medal. Maltais finished the World Cup season as the overall and Crystal Globe champion in her category. This was her second overall title having previously achieved the feat in 2005–06.

At the XVI Winter X Games Maltais won her first medal which came as the gold and X Games champion in 2012. She had followed this with several successes on the World Cup tour that year, including a home nation victory at Blue Mountain. This victory, among others, helped propel her to her second straight Crystal Globe championship as the overall winner on the FIS tour. Success continued further into the following season where Maltais again won several events, in the early stages. Maltais would also find further accomplishment by winning the silver at the 2013 World Snowboarding Championships which took place in her home province of Quebec. There she would place second, finishing familiarly behind teammate Ricker who won her first World Championship gold medal there.

Maltais went into the 2014 Winter Olympics as a strong medal contender with her results in the 2013–14 FIS Snowboard World Cup. At the Olympics, she qualified easily, Maltais was looking for some redemption from the previous Olympics where she crashed out in Vancouver. She qualified through from the semi's when, after a tough battle for the second position, Lindsey Jacobellis crashed when she was way out in front. This allowed for Maltais to enter the final. In that event, Eva Samkova who had dominated the event, from her fastest qualifying position through to the final, won gold but Maltais followed her through for silver.

== Personal ==
Her father is the mayor of Petite-Rivière-Saint-François, her birthplace and hometown where she also fulfills her career as a firefighter.
