= Katharina Himmler =

German snowboarder

Personal information
- Nationality: German
- Born: 6 June 1975 (age 49); Munich, Germany

Sport
- Country: Germany
- Sport: Snowboarding

Katharina Himmler (born 6 June 1975) is a German snowboarder.

She was born in Munich. She competed at the 2006 Winter Olympics, in snowboard cross. She competed in the parallel giant slalom at the 2002 Winter Olympics.
