= Maria Danielsson =

Swedish snowboarder (born 1981)

Personal information
- Nationality: Swedish
- Born: 28 July 1981 (age 43); Leksand, Sweden

Sport
- Country: Sweden
- Sport: Snowboarding

Maria Danielsson (born 28 July 1981) is a Swedish snowboarder.

She was born in Leksand. She competed at the 2006 Winter Olympics, in snowboard cross.
