= Natsuko Doi =

Japanese snowboarder (born 1979)

Personal information
- Nationality: Japanese
- Born: March 15, 1979 (age 46)

Sport
- Sport: Snowboarding

Natsuko Doi (born 15 March 1979 in Sapporo) is a Japanese snowboarder. She placed 14th in the women's snowboard cross event at the 2010 Winter Olympics.
