= Erin Simmons =

Canadian snowboarder

Erin Simmons (born July 9, 1976, in West Vancouver, British Columbia) is a Canadian snowboarder, specializing in the snowboard cross event.

Simmons made her World Cup debut in December 2001 at Whistler, BC. Her first World Cup podium came in February 2004, when she won bronze at an event in Niigata.

Erin has won four World Cup medals, with her best season coming in 2004, when she placed 10th overall in the snowboard cross standings. She competed at the FIS Snowboarding World Championships in 2005, placing 11th.

Simmons competed at the 2006 Winter Olympics, in the snowboard cross. She placed 17th in the qualifying rounds, one place short of advancing to the quarterfinals.

Erin Simmons competed in 8 Winter X Games and has 3 silver X-Games medals. 2001, 2002 & 2005.

== World Cup podiums ==
Date	Location	Rank
February 27, 2004	Niigata	3rd place, bronze medalist(s)
March 6, 2005	Lake Placid	2nd place, silver medalist(s)
December 8, 2005	Whistler	3rd place, bronze medalist(s)
December 9, 2005	Whistler	3rd place, bronze medalist(s)
