= Snowboard racing =

Snow sport

Snowboard racing is a form of snowboarding where competitors attempt to obtain the fastest time down a course. Snowboard racing can be done against the clock, or by two or more competitors racing in a head-to-head format.

The current Olympic snowboarding racing events are parallel giant slalom, parallel slalom and snowboard cross.

== Governing body ==
World tour events in snowboard racing are hosted by the International Ski and Snowboard Federation (FIS). The FIS currently organises both a world cup tour and a world championship for each of the Olympic snowboard racing events (parallel giant slalom, parallel slalom and snowboard cross). The International Snowboard Federation was the former governing body.

The struggling International Snowboard Federation does not currently host a world tour in any snowboard racing format, but it is possible that it may host a tour for banked slalom in coming years.

== Event types ==
The major racing events are as follows:

=== Parallel giant slalom ===
(PGS): The parallel giant slalom event includes two evenly spaced courses (10–15 meters apart) with vertical distances of 20–27 meters between turning gates, allowing speeds up to 70 km/h. Once qualifications are complete, racers are placed in a head-to-head knockout format, starting with 16 athletes and moving to a final race for 1st and 2nd. It uses a much longer course than parallel slalom with gates set further apart (spaced 20–27 meters apart), resulting in even higher speeds, while racing against an opponent on a similar course place parallel to the other course. Parallel giant slalom is an Olympic event, and the FIS organises a world tour and world cup for this event.

=== Giant slalom ===
(GS): The original Olympic discipline for snowboard racing was giant slalom, but it featured in only one Winter Olympics (Nagano 1998). It uses a much longer course than slalom, with gates set further apart (spaced 25–32 meters apart), resulting in even higher speeds. This event is still staged at Continental Cup and Regional level, but the last giant slalom world cup was held in 2000 at Mt. Ste Anne, Quebec, Canada, with Jasey-Jay Anderson (CAN) and Karine Ruby (FRA)] winning.

=== Parallel slalom ===
(PSL): Parallel slalom debuted at the Olympics in 2014 in Sochi, Russia. Boarders race downhill through sets of gates that force extremely tight and quick turns (spaced 8–15 meters apart), requiring plenty of technical skill while racing against an opponent in the other course.

=== Triple slalom ===
(TS): The triple slalom is a concept event that has been tested as a North American cup event in November 2011 at Copper Mountain. It was spearheaded by the Canadian team, as FIS had discussed it as a world cup event and possibly an Olympic format for slalom, but it had not been tested till that point. Once it was tested, it was realized it may have potential but was not the right fit for an Olympic discipline.

=== Slalom ===
(SL): In slalom, boarders race downhill through sets of gates that force extremely tight and quick turns, (spaced 8–15 meters apart) requiring plenty of technical skill while racing against the clock. The winner of this event is based on 2 runs combined time.

=== Super-G ===
(SG): Boarders competing in a Super G event travel through sets of gates spaced 30–40 meters apart, requiring plenty of courage and speed while testing the endurance of the racer at speeds of up to 100 km/h. This has not been a world cup event since 1999 at Mt. Bachelor, Oregon.

=== Snowboard cross ===
(SBX): In snowboard cross, four snowboard racers start simultaneously atop an inclined course. The racers go over a series of features while trying to reach the finish line first. Snowboard cross became an Olympic sport in 2006.

=== Team snowboard cross ===
Team snowboard cross is a relatively new event. US Snowboard requested it be a part of the Winter Olympics starting in 2018. It will be confirmed in Fall 2014.

=== Banked slalom ===
Banked slalom is a group of events, primarily in the Pacific Northwest, with events held across Western North America and elsewhere. Established Banked Slalom events include Mt. Baker Banked Slalom, Neil Edgeworth Banked Slalom (NEBS) at Big White, BC and Dick's Ditch Classic (Jackson Hole, Wyoming). Events typically consist of a gully run that is left unprepared, safety fencing on the turns and in spill zones and an open format. Notable winners of the Baker Banked Slalom include Ross Rebagliati, Terje Haakonsen and Maelle Ricker.
