= Julie Wendel Lundholdt =

Danish snowboarder

Personal information
- Born: 20 November 1983 (age 42) Copenhagen, Denmark
- Height: 179 cm (5 ft 10 in)
- Weight: 80 kg (176 lb)
- Website: JulieLundholdt.dk

Sport
- Country: Denmark
- Sport: Snowboard
- Event: Snowboard Cross

Julie Wendel Lundholdt (born 20 November 1983) is a Danish former snowboarder from Copenhagen, Denmark. Julie Lundholdt is currently not ranked and has ended her professional snowboard carrier.

== 2010 Olympics ==
Lundholdt failed to progress from the quarterfinal round of Snowboard Cross at the 2010 Winter Olympics in Vancouver, British Columbia. Canada's Maëlle Ricker went on to win the gold medal for the host country.
