= Stephanie Hickey =

Australian snowboarder

Personal information
- Nationality: Australian
- Born: 3 July 1985 (age 41) Melbourne, Victoria
- Height: 165 cm (65 in) (2010)
- Weight: 60 kg (130 lb) (2010)

Sport
- Country: Australia
- Sport: Snowboarding
- Events: Slalom; Snowboard cross
- Club: Mount Buller
- Coached by: Lukas Prem

Achievements and titles
- Olympic finals: 2010 Winter Olympics

Stephanie Hickey (born 3 July 1985) is an Australian snowboard slalom and snowboard cross competitor, who has worked as a presenter and MC for winter sport and surf events. Her competitive snowboarding career started when she was fifteen years old. She competed in the 2010 Winter Olympics in snowboard cross, finishing in eighteenth place, failing by two positions to qualify for the event finals. Stephanie is the older sister to Annabelle Hickey, who similarly, is an accredited instructor and talented snowboarder.

== Personal ==
Nicknamed 'Little Miss Sunshine', 'Stickey' and 'Freggle', Hickey was born on 3 July 1985 in Melbourne, Victoria. She is from the Mt Buller area, and lived in Brighton and Prahran in 2010. She is 1.65 metres (5 ft 5 in) tall and weighs 60 kilograms (130 lb).

Hickey attended Victorian College of the Arts, where she studied musical theatre. She also studied at Deakin University, graduating with a Bachelor of Arts. She worked for the Seven Network as a Victorian snow reporter in 2006 and 2007. In 2007, she served as a live presenter for Going Ballistyx. She started working as an East Coast MC for the Billabong Girls Get Out There surf events in 2007.

In addition to snowboarding, she competed in dancing for ten years.

== Snowboarding ==
Hickey competes in snowboard slalom and snowboard cross. She has been affiliated with the Victorian Institute of Sport and coached by Lukas Prem. While snowboarding, she has injured herself several times, including a September 2008 crash that dislocated five ribs, a January 2009 tear of her medial collateral ligament while competing in Austria, and a 2010 concussion and memory loss following a crash.

Hickey began competitive snowboarding when she was sixteen years old, competing in snowboard slalom in Australia's domestic season. Her first international competition was the 2003 World Snowboard Championships, where she competed in the snowboard slalom and snowboard cross events. In 2005, she competed at the USASA Junior Nationals, and participated in a training camp at Copper Mountain in the lead up to the event. She competed at the 2006 and 2008 Australian National Championship in snowboard cross, and at an event in September 2008 in Argentina. At the Snowboarding World Cup in Chapelco, Argentina in the 2008/09 skiing season, she finished twelfth, her best World Cup event finish as of February 2010; the following year, she finished fifteenth. She competed at an event in Bad Gasten, Austria in January 2009 and made the finals at the New Zealand Open the same year. During the 2009 World Cup season, she qualified as a top 16 competitor. That year, she also competed at the Australian and New Zealand Championship. In the 2009/10 skiing season, in addition to the Snowboarding World Cup, she competed in three other World Cup events. A top thirty finish qualified her for the 2010 Winter Olympics in late January.

Hickey was 24 years old at the 2010 Winter Olympics. In her first snowboard cross race, she had a time of 1min 35.26sec. She did not qualify for the finals after she fell during her second race and finished in 18th position overall in the qualifying round. Only the top 16 snowboarders advanced to the finals.
