= Claire Chapotot =

French snowboarder (born 1990)

Personal information
- Nationality: French
- Born: January 30, 1990 (age 35)

Sport
- Sport: Snowboarding

Claire Chapotot (born 30 January 1990 in Gap, Hautes-Alpes) is a French snowboarder. She placed 13th in the women's snowboard cross event at the 2010 Winter Olympics.
