= Zoe Gillings =

Retired Manx / British Olympic snowboard athlete

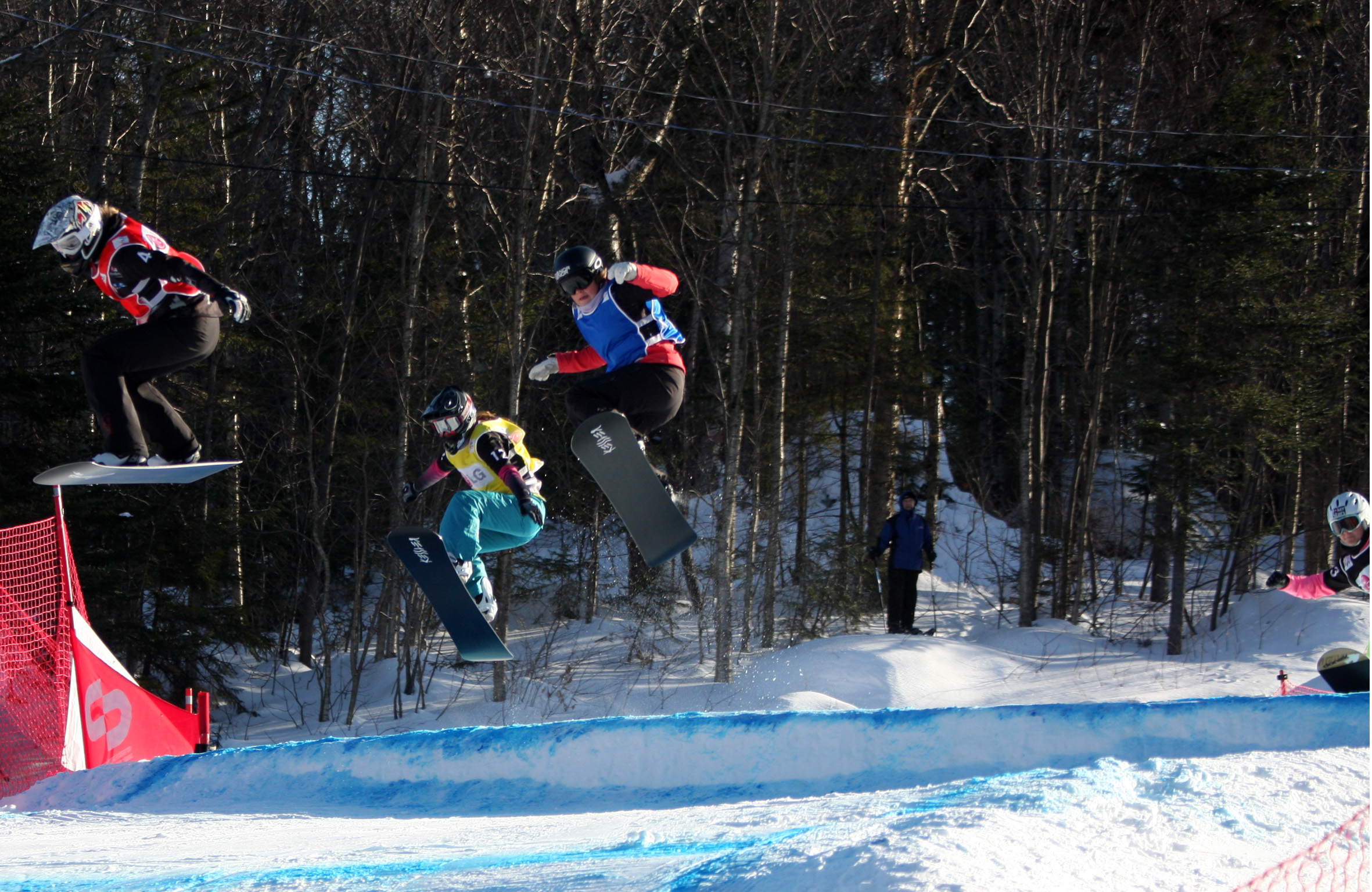
Dominique Maltais, Deborah Anthonioz, Helene Olafsen, Zoe Gillings at the 2009–10 FIS World Cup stop in Stoneham

Zoe Gillings-Brier (née Gillings, born 14 June 1985) is a Manx and British snowboarder. She won seven medals at the FIS World Cup including one gold. Gillings competed at the 2006, 2010, 2014, and the 2018 Winter Olympics making her the only British snowboarder to compete in 4 Olympics.

== Career ==
Gillings was born in the Isle of Man and began snowboarding at the age of 10, after switching from skiing. She competed in snowboard cross, and won seven medals at the FIS Snowboard World Cup. She was ranked 1st in the world on the World Cup snowboard Cross ranking for roughly 3 months during the 2004 / 2005 season. At the 2006 Winter Olympics, Gillings finished 15th in the first ever women's snowboard cross event. In the 2007/08 season, her best results were 6th at the X Games in Colorado, US, 4th in the Korean (Sungwoo) FIS World Cup final, and 2nd in the Japan (Gugi-Gifu) FIS World Cup snowboardcross final. She was awarded British Olympic Association Athlete of the Year (Snowsport) 2007/08. In the 2008/09 season, she finished 3rd in the FIS World Cup meetings in Valmalenco, Italy and Bad Gastein, Austria, and won the German National Championships. She was awarded the British Olympic Association Athlete of the Year (Snowsport) for the second successive year. At the 2010 Winter Olympics, Gillings finished 8th in the women's event. In 2010/11, she finished 3rd in a World Cup meeting in Arosa, Switzerland, and in 2011/12, she finished 3rd in the World Cup event in Valmalenco, Italy. At the 2014 Winter Olympics, Gillings finished 9th in the women's event; she missed out on the final on a photo finish. After the Games, Gillings lost her Olympic funding. Gillings-Brier competed in her final Olympics, the 2018 Winter Olympics in Pyeongchang, South Korea, making her the only snowboarder to represent Britain at four Winter Olympics.

== Personal life ==
Gillings was homeschooled and enjoyed many different sports as a child. Gillings married her coach Dan Brier in August 2014, after which she changed her surname to Gillings-Brier, giving her the initials Zoe GB. In August 2016, the couple had their first child. Zoe continued competing after pregnancy up until the end of the 2018 season. After retirement she had a second child.
