= Snowboarding at the 2006 Winter Olympics =

Snowboarding at the XX Olympic Winter Games
- Venue: Bardonecchia
- Dates: 12–23 February 2006
- No. of events: 6
- Competitors: 187 from 24 nations

The 2006 Winter Olympic Games Snowboarding competition consisted of men's and women's halfpipe, parallel giant slalom and snowboard cross events.

== Medal summary ==
=== Medal table ===
Rank	Nation	Gold	Silver	Bronze	Total
1	United States	3	3	1	7
2	Switzerland	3	1	0	4
3	Germany	0	1	0	1
3	Slovakia	0	1	0	1
5	Austria	0	0	1	1
5	Canada	0	0	1	1
5	Finland	0	0	1	1
5	France	0	0	1	1
5	Norway	0	0	1	1
Totals (9 entries)		6	6	6	18

=== Men's events ===
Event	Gold	Silver	Bronze
Halfpipe	Shaun White; United States	Danny Kass; United States	Markku Koski; Finland
Parallel giant slalom	Philipp Schoch; Switzerland	Simon Schoch; Switzerland	Siegfried Grabner; Austria
Snowboard cross	Seth Wescott; United States	Radoslav Židek; Slovakia	Paul-Henri de Le Rue; France

=== Women's events ===
Event	Gold	Silver	Bronze
Halfpipe	Hannah Teter; United States	Gretchen Bleiler; United States	Kjersti Buaas; Norway
Parallel giant slalom	Daniela Meuli; Switzerland	Amelie Kober; Germany	Rosey Fletcher; United States
Snowboard cross	Tanja Frieden; Switzerland	Lindsey Jacobellis; United States	Dominique Maltais; Canada

== Participating NOCs ==
Twenty-four nations competed in the snowboarding events at Torino.

- Australia (9)
- Austria (12)
- Brazil (1)
- Bulgaria (1)
- Canada (16)
- China (2)
- Czech Republic (3)
- Spain (5)
- Finland (5)
- France (16)
- Germany (11)
- Great Britain (4)
- Italy (16)
- Japan (13)
- Netherlands (2)
- Norway (4)
- New Zealand (3)
- Poland (6)
- Russia (8)
- Slovenia (4)
- Slovakia (1)
- Sweden (13)
- Switzerland (16)
- United States (16)
