= Tanja Frieden =

Swiss snowboarder (born 1976)

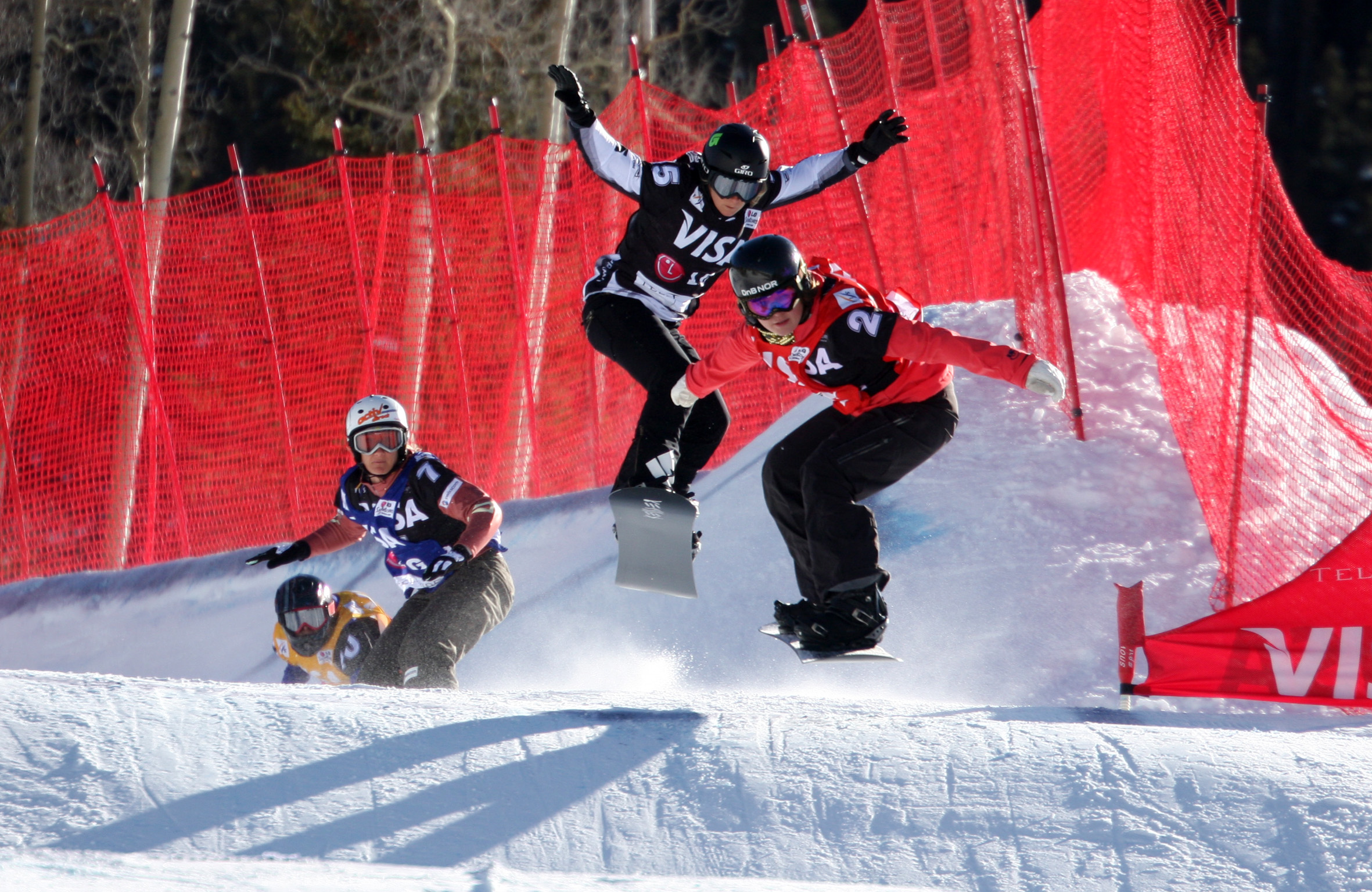
- Helene Olafsen (leading), Alexandra Jekova, Tanja Frieden, Nelly Moenne Loccoz. Telluride, 19 December 2009, Quarter Final

Personal information
- Nationality: Swiss
- Born: 6 February 1976 (age 50) Bern

Sport
- Sport: Snowboarding
Medal record
Tanja Frieden
Medal record
Women's Snowboarding
Representing Switzerland
Olympic Games
Gold medal – first place	2006 Turin	Snowboard Cross

Tanja Frieden (born 6 February 1976, in Bern) is a Swiss snowboarder. She won a gold medal in the inaugural Snowboard Cross competition at the 2006 Winter Olympics.

In the Snowboard Cross finals at the 2006 Winter Olympics, Frieden was in second place well behind the American Lindsey Jacobellis, when the latter crashed while attempting to showboat on the second to last jump. Frieden passed Jacobellis and won the gold medal. In her pocket was a Norwegian flag in memory of her friend, snowboarder Line Østvold, who died in a training accident in 2004 aged 25.

Frieden, whose mother is from Norway, is fluent in Norwegian, as well as the Swiss German dialect of her native area. She also can speak German, French and English.

She is a primary school teacher in Switzerland and lives half the year near her home town by the mountains of the Bernese Oberland. The other half she is on a world tour in the ski/snowboard races.

After an Achilles heel injury which left her unable to defend her Olympic title, Frieden retired from snowboard cross three weeks before the Vancouver Games in 2010.

Awards
Preceded by (Switzerland) Simone Niggli-Luder	Swiss Sportswoman of the Year; 2006	Succeeded by Simone Niggli-Luder
