= Mellie Francon =

Swiss snowboarder

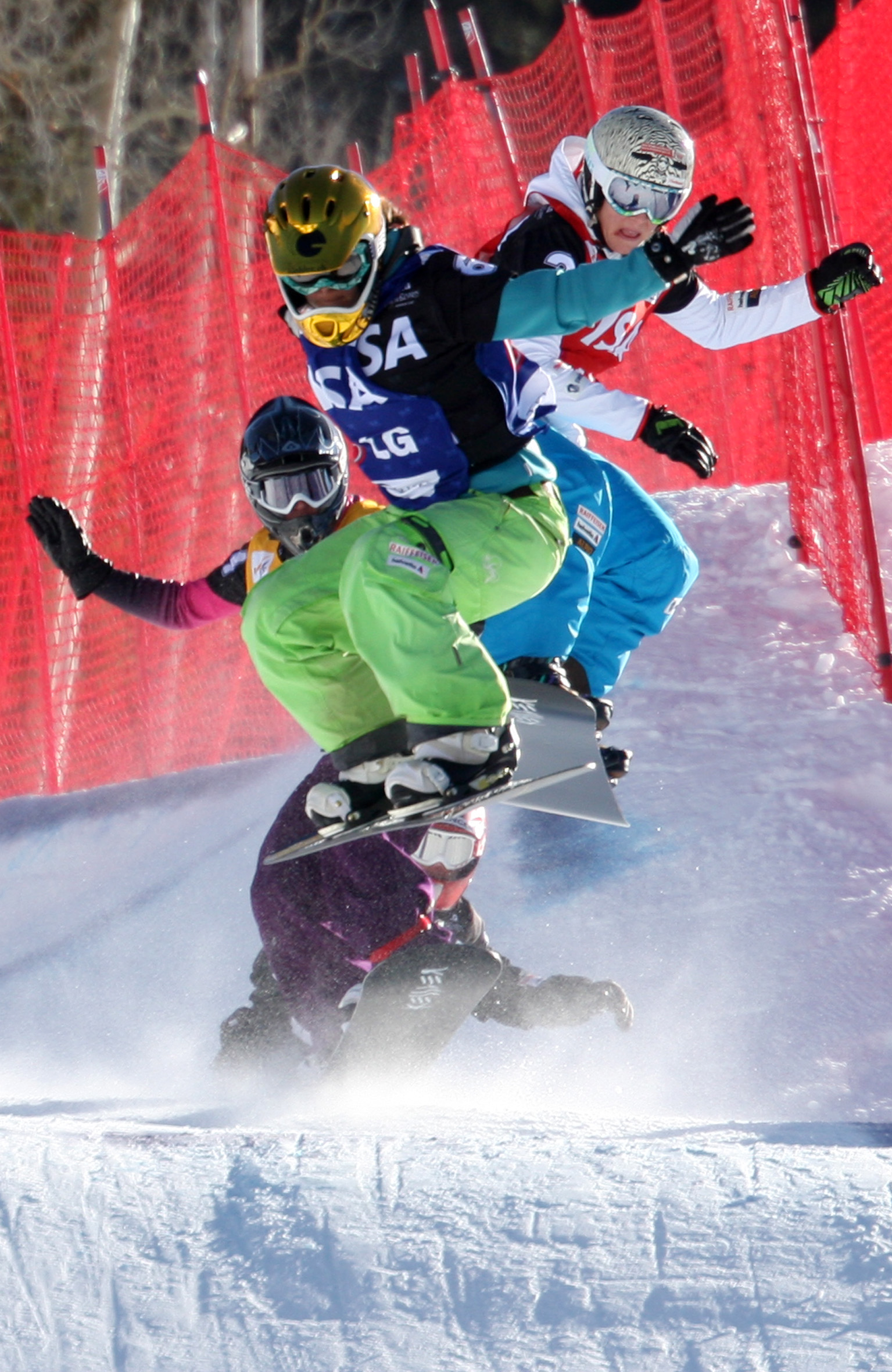
- Mellie Francon, Simona Meiler, Deborah Anthonioz, Emilie Aubry. Telluride, 19 December 2009. Quarter Final

Medal record

Women's snowboarding

Representing Switzerland

World Championships
Bronze medal – third place	2009 Gangwon	Snowboard Cross

Mellie Francon (born 24 January 1982 in La Chaux-de-Fonds) is a Swiss snowboarder.

Francon is Swiss Champion 2005 in snowboard cross. On 5 January 2006 she won the World Cup competition at Bad Gastein.
