= Maëlle Ricker =

Canadian snowboarder

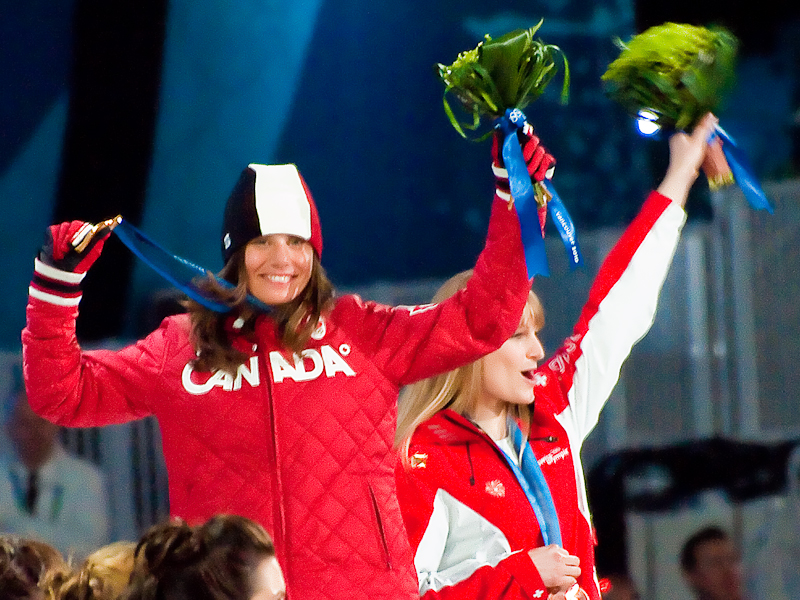
- Maëlle Ricker receives her gold medal at the 2010 Olympic medal ceremony.

Personal information
- Born: December 2, 1978 (age 47) North Vancouver, British Columbia, Canada
- Height: 1.70 m (5 ft 7 in)
- Weight: 63 kg (139 lb)
- Website: www.maellericker.ca/

Sport
- Country: Canada
- Sport: Snowboard cross
Medal record
Women's snowboarding
Representing Canada
Olympic Games
Gold medal – first place	2010 Vancouver	Snowboard cross
World Championships
Gold medal – first place	2013 Stoneham	Snowboard cross
Bronze medal – third place	2005 Whistler	Snowboard cross
Winter X Games
Gold medal – first place	2006	Snowboard cross
Gold medal – first place	1999	Snowboard cross
Bronze medal – third place	2007	Snowboard cross
Bronze medal – third place	2012	Snowboard cross

Maëlle Danica Ricker (/maɪˈɛl/; born December 2, 1978) is a Canadian retired snowboarder, who specialised in snowboard cross. She won an Olympic gold medal in the snowboard cross event at the 2010 Winter Olympics in Vancouver, to become the first Canadian woman to win a gold medal on home soil at the Olympics. She is also the 2013 World Champion and two-time Winter X Games Champion (1999, 2006).

== Career ==
Ricker was born in North Vancouver, British Columbia, and resides in Squamish, British Columbia. As a young girl Ricker had two dreams: to compete competitively in snowboarding, and to compete in snowboarding at the Winter Olympics, despite the fact that Snowboarding was not an Olympic sport at the time. She first competed in the FIS Snowboard World Cup during the 1996–97 season, twice standing on the podium in her rookie season. She competed at her first Olympics in 1998 in Nagano where only parallel giant slalom and halfpipe were Olympic snowboard events. Ricker competed in the halfpipe event placing fifth. After Nagano, Ricker began competing in multiple snowboard disciplines, competing in both the halfpipe and in the newer sport of boarder cross. She won her first World Cup gold in the discipline of snowboard cross later that year in 1998. She was forced to skip the 2002 Winter Olympics because of injury. At the 2006 Winter Olympics she placed 23rd in Women's halfpipe and 4th in the Women's Snowboard Cross event. She crashed hard in the race, and was hospitalized with a minor concussion. Ricker later said that she did not remember her crash, and that finishing fourth in 2006 was like "seeing the love of your life on the subway but never getting to meet them."

Ricker won a bronze medal in the same event at Winter X Games XI. She was the overall world cup champion during the 07/08 season. She also previously competed in the halfpipe world championships, with her highest finish being 7th in 2003. She is a two time X Games gold medalist in snowboard cross winning the gold in both the 1999 Winter X Games and the Winter X-Games 10.

=== 2010 Winter Olympics ===
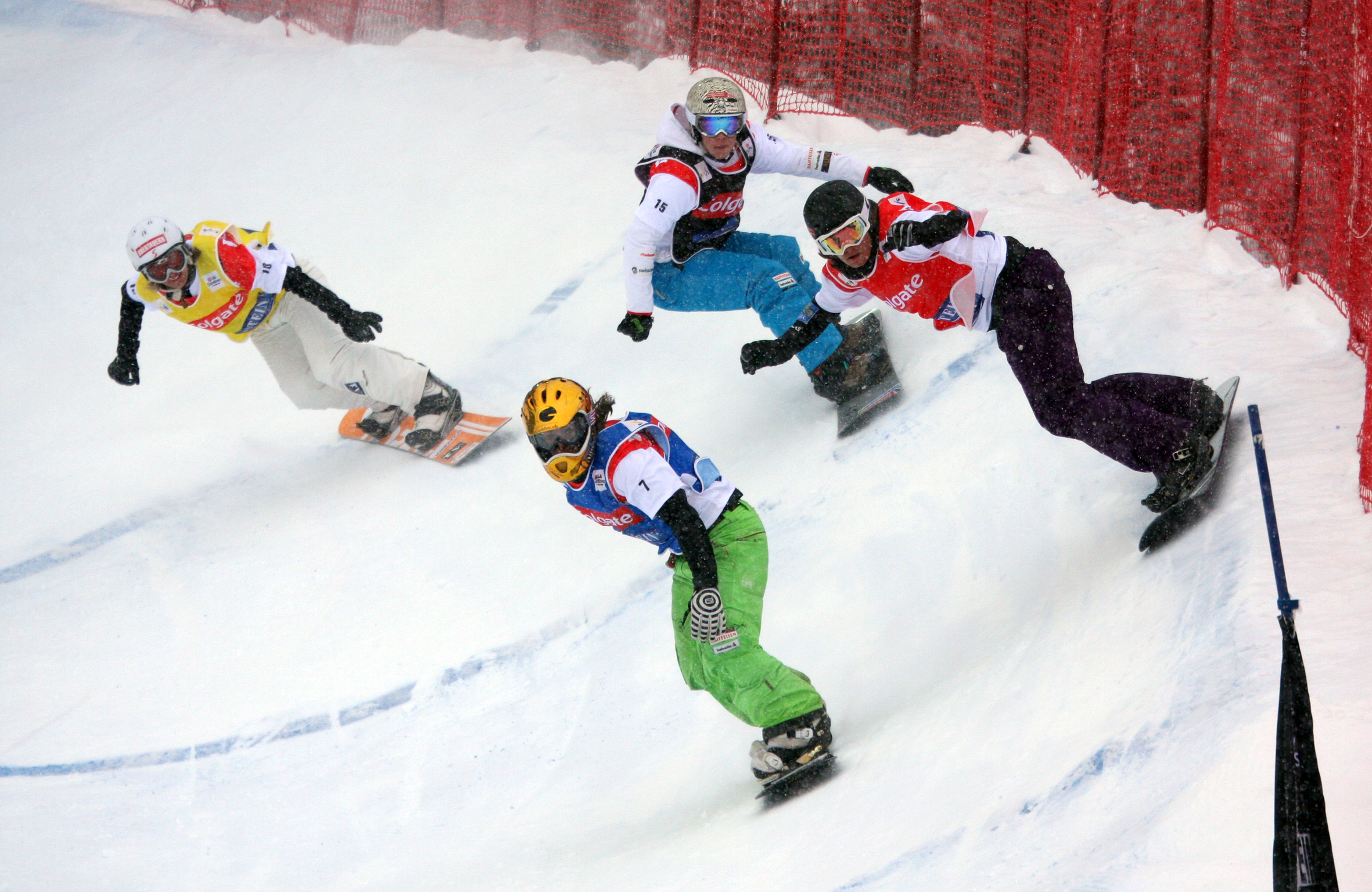
Maelle Ricker (red) trails Mellie Francon at a World Cup event in Bad Gastein in January, 2010.

Ricker did exceptionally well in the Vancouver 2010 Olympic Winter Games. She headed into the 2010 Winter Olympics in Vancouver as the overall leader in the 2009–10 FIS Snowboard World Cup. She skipped the Winter X Games in January to focus on the Olympics. The women's snowboard cross event began on February 16, and the event started out nervously enough for the Canadian contingent in women's snowboard cross. Both she and Dominique Maltais fell on the same berm on their first qualifying run. With fog and weather conditions threatening to cancel the second and final qualifying run, both Canadians would have been out of the finals if officials had canceled the run. However the decision was made to carry on with the qualifying, conditions improved, and Ricker would successfully qualify in third place. When asked about her fall after the race Ricker said that it "was heartbreaking after that first run. I had to go back up to the start, refocus and think about my lines. I had to visualize all the stuff we’ve been training all week, all year, the last few years."

Ricker won her quarter-final with ease, but because of only finishing third in qualifying, was placed in a semi-final with gold medal contender Lindsey Jacobellis. In the run, however, Jacobellis was disqualified for missing a gate and Ricker carried on, qualifying for the A-final. In the medal final Ricker again took a large lead out of the starting gate and won the gold medal with relative ease, becoming the first Canadian woman to win an Olympic gold medal on home soil. Ricker won the gold just minutes from her childhood home in North Vancouver and described the Olympic victory "like a crazy dream". For Ricker, the gold was redemption for her fall and concussion during the 2006 Olympic Games in Turin. She said that "Turin was such a motivator for me. It just made me work that much harder and just go for it today."

=== Present ===
Ricker followed her successful Olympics with a great start to the 2010–11 FIS Snowboard World Cup. She was second in the snowboard cross standings for the World Cup heading into the 2011 FIS Snowboarding World Championships. In the finals of the snowboard cross at the World Championships Ricker was closely following longtime nemesis Jacobellis. While trying to pass, she got too close to Jacobellis, caught an edge, and crashed, injuring her hand and finishing fourth. Ricker won a bronze medal at the XVI Winter X Games where fellow Canadian Maltais had won that year. She also managed several podiums through that part of the 2011–12 FIS Snowboard World Cup, though not achieving any victories.

At the 2013 World Championships, Ricker struck gold again. She managed to beat compatriot Maltais, who had won most of the World Cup events, however Ricker pipped her to the line on the battle that occurred on home soil at these championships. This was Ricker's first gold medal at the World Championships, despite winning nearly every contest she has entered, this medal eluded her until this competition which she won at the age of 34. Ricker lightly made note of both her and Maltais' age versus their competitors when she said that "We’re the dinosaurs of the group. But experience plays a lot in these technical races. It’s definitely something I have to use to my advantage since I don’t have youth on my side anymore. I have to be smart with my training, smart with some of my landings".

Just days before the 2014 Olympics were to begin Ricker suffered a wrist injury severe enough that it required surgery, in a training session. Despite this the Canadian Olympic Committee expected that she would be able to compete at the games. She was the second Canadian snowboarder to suffer an injury just before the games after Mark McMorris, also a gold medal contender, was injured in his final run at the 2014 Winter X Games.

== Personal ==
Ricker grew up in West Vancouver, the daughter of Karl Ricker, now a retired geologist, and Nancy Ricker, now a retired biology professor from Capilano University. When Ricker was a child her father had wanted her to take up skiing, but she chose snowboarding instead. She first learned to snowboard in her teens when she chased her brother Jörli Ricker down Whistler Mountain and credits her brother for getting her into the sport of snowboarding. As a student, Ricker attended high school at Sentinel Secondary School in West Vancouver. Ricker lists Clara Hughes, Canadian flag bearer at the opening ceremonies for the 2010 games, as her hero. Ricker is bilingual, speaking both French and English fluently.
