= Lindsey Jacobellis =

American snowboarder (born 1985)

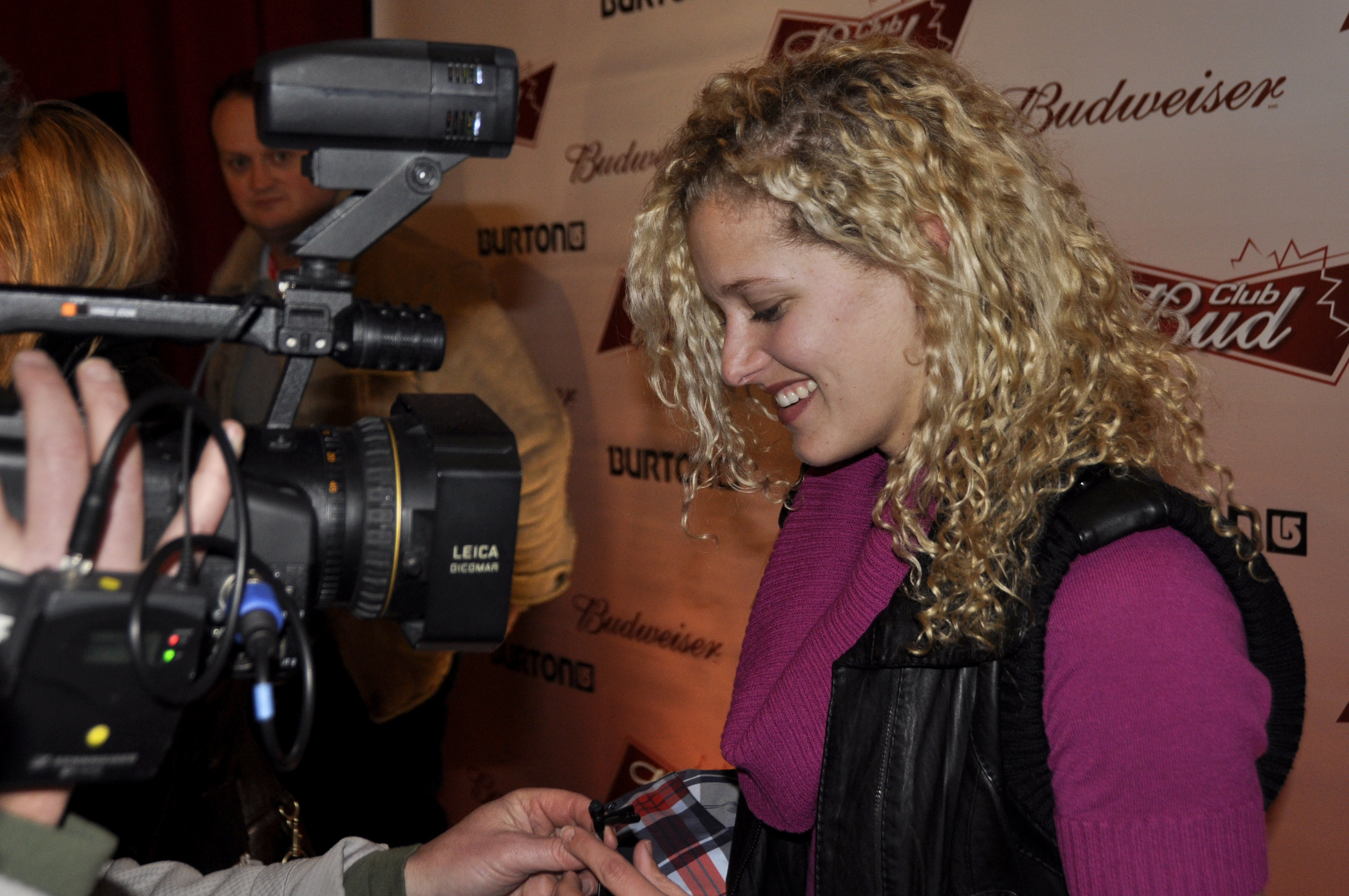
- Jacobellis in 2010

Personal information
- Born: August 19, 1985 (age 40) Danbury, Connecticut, U.S.

Sport
- Country: United States
- Sport: Snowboarding
- Event(s): Snowboard cross, halfpipe
- Coached by: Peter Foley

Achievements and titles
- Olympic finals: Gold medal at the 2022 Winter Olympics in Beijing
- World finals: Gold medal at the 2005 World Championships in Whistler; Gold medal at the 2007 World Championships in Arosa; Gold medal at the 2011 World Championships in La Molina; Gold Medal at the 2015 World Championships in Kreischberg; Gold Medal at the 2017 World Championships in Sierra Nevada
- Highest world ranking: 1st in Snowboard Cross World Cup (2007, 2009)
Medal record
Women's snowboarding
Representing the United States
International snowboarding competitions
Event	1st	2nd	3rd
Olympic Games	2	1	0
World Championships	6	0	2
Winter X Games	10	1	1
Junior World Championships	2	0	0
Total	20	2	3
Olympic Games
Gold medal – first place	2022 Beijing	Snowboard cross
Gold medal – first place	2022 Beijing	Mixed team snowboard cross
Silver medal – second place	2006 Turin	Snowboard cross
World Championships
Gold medal – first place	2005 Whistler	Snowboard cross
Gold medal – first place	2007 Arosa	Snowboard cross
Gold medal – first place	2011 La Molina	Snowboard cross
Gold medal – first place	2015 Kreischberg	Snowboard cross
Gold medal – first place	2017 Sierra Nevada	Snowboard cross
Gold medal – first place	2019 Utah	Mixed team snowboard cross
Bronze medal – third place	2017 Sierra Nevada	Team snowboard cross
Bronze medal – third place	2023 Bakuriani	Snowboard cross
Winter X Games
Gold medal – first place	2003 Aspen	Snowboard cross
Gold medal – first place	2004 Aspen	Snowboard cross
Gold medal – first place	2005 Aspen	Snowboard cross
Gold medal – first place	2008 Aspen	Snowboard cross
Gold medal – first place	2009 Aspen	Snowboard cross
Gold medal – first place	2010 Aspen	Snowboard cross
Gold medal – first place	2011 Aspen	Snowboard cross
Gold medal – first place	2014 Aspen	Snowboard cross
Gold medal – first place	2015 Aspen	Snowboard cross
Gold medal – first place	2016 Aspen	Snowboard cross
Silver medal – second place	2007 Aspen	Snowboard cross
Bronze medal – third place	2003 Aspen	Slopestyle
Junior World Championships
Gold medal – first place	2002 Rovaniemi	Snowboard cross
Gold medal – first place	2003 Prato Nevoso	Halfpipe

Lindsey Jacobellis (born August 19, 1985) is an American snowboarder from Roxbury, Connecticut. The most decorated female snowboard cross athlete of all time, she dominated the sport for almost two decades as a five-time World Champion and ten-time X Games champion. In her Olympic debut at the 2006 Winter Olympics in Turin, Jacobellis won the silver medal in snowboard cross but was unable to medal at the next three Olympics until winning gold at the 2022 Winter Olympics in Beijing. Jacobellis also won gold (with teammate Nick Baumgartner) in mixed team snowboard cross at the 2022 Winter Olympics in Beijing.

== Early life ==
Jacobellis was born in Danbury, Connecticut and grew up in Danbury and southern Vermont, where her family had a weekend home. Her parents, Ben and Anita Jacobellis encouraged her and her older brother Ben to participate in many sports. She was competitive from a young age, constantly trying to keep up with Ben or her father on the slopes. As a young child, she was primarily a skier, but she switched to snowboarding after the family's home burned when she was 8, destroying all her gear. She explains the switch by saying, "We couldn't afford to buy all new ski equipment; we could only afford to buy snowboards." She attended Vermont's Stratton Mountain School, a college preparatory high school with a sports focus on training winter athletes, graduating in 2003. She was the only girl racing in snowboard cross and says that competing against boys influenced how she approached the sport.

== Sports career ==
Jacobellis has snowboarded competitively in snowboard cross, snowboard slopestyle, and snowboard halfpipe competitions.

=== Early career ===
At the 2003 Winter X Games, Jacobellis won bronze in slopestyle.

She made her Olympic debut at the 2006 Winter Olympics in Turin, making her first Olympic final in the process. During the snowboard cross final, Jacobellis was approaching the end of the course with a 43-meter (140 ft), three-second lead over Tanja Frieden of Switzerland. On the second-to-last jump, Jacobellis attempted a celebratory method grab, landed on the edge of her snowboard, and fell. Frieden passed her to win the gold; Jacobellis recovered and settled for silver. In televised interviews, Jacobellis initially said the grab was meant to maintain stability, but later said that "I was having fun. Snowboarding is fun, and I wanted to share my enthusiasm with the crowd".

At the 2007 Winter X Games, Jacobellis lost the lead in a fall near the finish line in snowboard cross.

She dropped halfpipe from her competition schedule in 2008 due to increasing injuries. Jacobellis regained the gold medal in snowboard cross at Winter X Games XII in 2008.

=== 2010–2013 ===
Jacobellis failed to progress to the medal round of snowboard cross at the 2010 Winter Olympics in Vancouver, as early in her semifinal race, she landed badly during a jump, and to avoid a collision with another rider, went through a gate, resulting in automatic disqualification; she then slid off the course. She ended up 5th in the standings.

In 2011, Jacobellis won her fourth straight gold in snowboard cross at the Winter X Games, adding to her gold medals in 2008, 2009, and 2010.

=== 2014–2017 ===
Jacobellis failed to progress to the medal round of snowboard cross at the 2014 Winter Olympics in Sochi. She was leading the semifinal race when she crashed. She finished in 7th place in the overall standings.

At the 2015 World Championship, Jacobellis won gold in snowboard cross. She also won the 2017 World Championship and finished with a silver and two golds in the first World Cup races of the 2017–2018 season.

The New York Times reported that in the period between the 2014 and 2018 Olympics, in addition to her training, surfing, and other competition strategies, Jacobellis also began working with the mental skills coach Denise Shull.

=== 2018–present ===
At the 2018 Winter Olympics in Pyeongchang, Jacobellis made her second Olympic snowboard cross final. After leading most of the way, she missed the podium by .003 seconds, finishing in 4th place.

In her fifth Olympics, Jacobellis finally became the Olympic champion in snowboard cross at the 2022 Winter Olympics in Beijing. This was the first gold medal for the US in Beijing, ending a five-day gold medal drought. Various media outlets lauded her perseverance in winning after a sixteen-year chase for Olympic gold. Jacobellis followed up her individual gold by winning the debut of the mixed team snowboard cross with partner Nick Baumgartner.

== Television ==
Jacobellis appeared on a charity edition of MTV's The Challenge, titled The Challenge: Champs vs. Pros. She competed to raise money for the American Society for the Prevention of Cruelty to Animals. She finished as the runner-up with her teammate in the final challenge, Kamerion Wimbley.

In addition to her athletic skill, she is known for her naturally curly hair and is sponsored by hair care brand Paul Mitchell.

Jacobellis will be joining NBC Sports' broadcast coverage of the 2026 Winter Olympics as an analyst.

== Personal life ==
On July 15, 2025, Jacobellis revealed that she had given birth to a daughter.

== Awards ==
- ANOC Gala Awards 2022：Best Mixed Team Event Performance of Beijing 2022
