= Déborah Anthonioz =

French snowboarder (born 1978)

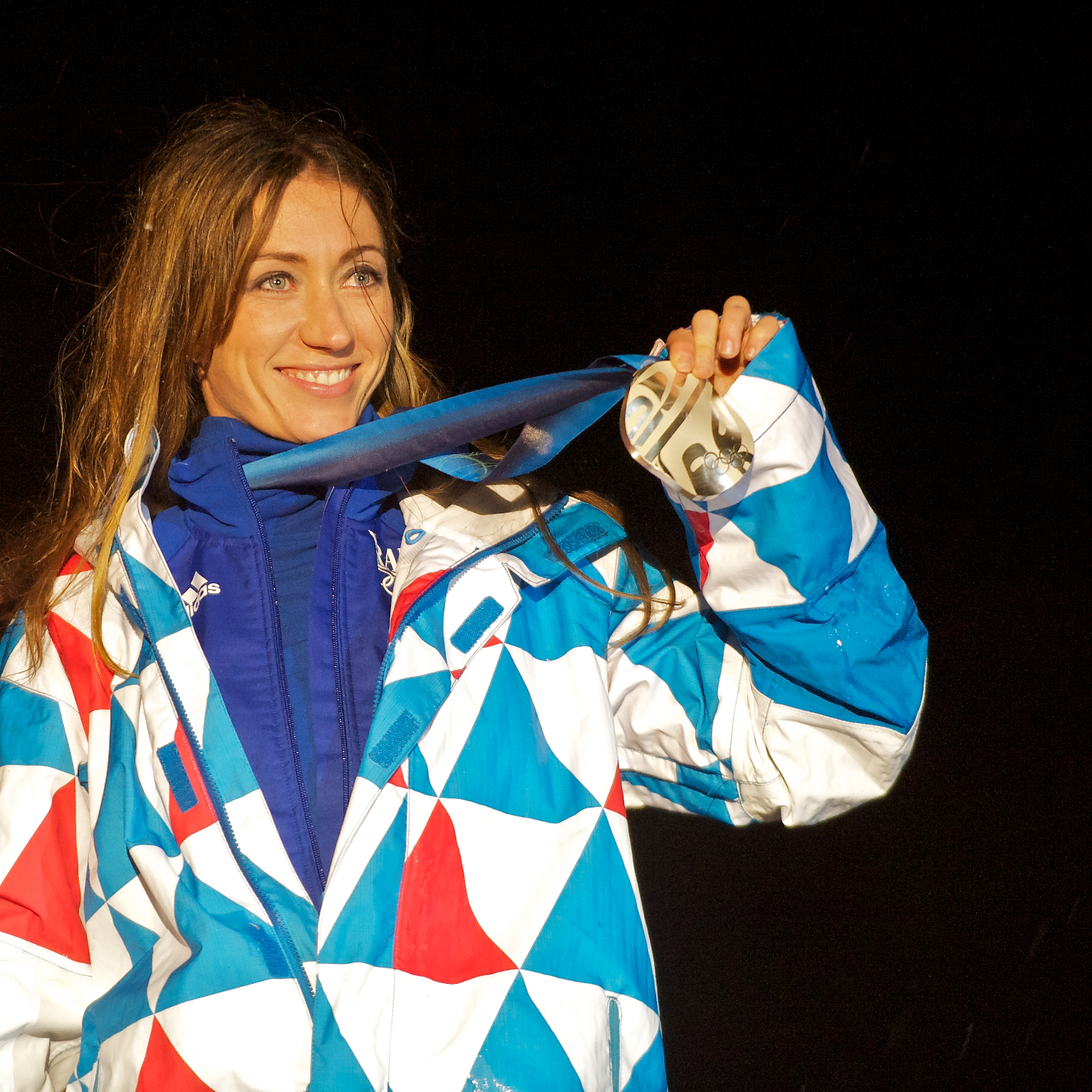
- Anthonioz in 2010

Personal information
- Born: 29 August 1978 (age 47) Thonon-les-Bains, France
Medal record
Women's snowboarding
Representing France
Olympic Games
Silver medal – second place	2010 Vancouver	Snowboard Cross
Winter X Games
Bronze medal – third place	2011 Aspen	Snowboard Cross

Déborah Anthonioz (born 29 August 1978) is a French snowboarder and Olympic athlete who won a silver medal in women's snowboard cross at the 2010 Winter Olympics.
