= FIS Freestyle Ski and Snowboarding World Championships 2019 – Men's snowboard big air =

Men's snowboard big air at the FIS Freestyle Ski and Snowboarding World Championships 2019
- Venue: Park City Mountain Resort
- Location: Utah, United States
- Dates: February 5–6
- Competitors: 56 from 23 nations

The Men's snowboard big air competition at the FIS Freestyle Ski and Snowboarding World Championships 2019 was scheduled to be held on February 5 and 6, 2019. Due to bad weather conditions, the competition was cancelled.

== Qualification ==
=== Heat 1 ===
| Rank | Bib | Name | Country | Run 1 | Run 2 | Best | Notes |
|---|---|---|---|---|---|---|---|
| | 1 | Judd Henkes | United States | | | | |
| | 2 | Takeru Otsuka | Japan | | | | |
| | 3 | Yuri Okubo | Japan | | | | |
| | 4 | Clemens Millauer | Austria | | | | |
| | 5 | Sven Thorgren | Sweden | | | | |
| | 6 | Sacha Moretti | France | | | | |
| | 7 | Rene Rinnekangas | Finland | | | | |
| | 8 | Jonas Bösiger | Switzerland | | | | |
| | 9 | Lyon Farrell | United States | | | | |
| | 10 | Mons Røisland | Norway | | | | |
| | 11 | Yang Wenlong | China | | | | |
| | 12 | Mikhail Matveev | Russia | | | | |
| | 13 | Casper Wolf | Netherlands | | | | |
| | 14 | Darcy Sharpe | Canada | | | | |
| | 15 | Rowan Coultas | Great Britain | | | | |
| | 16 | Brolin Mawejje | Uganda | | | | |
| | 17 | Nicola Liviero | Italy | | | | |
| | 18 | Emil Zulian | Italy | | | | |
| | 19 | Måns Hedberg | Sweden | | | | |
| | 20 | Michael Ciccarelli | Canada | | | | |
| | 21 | Moritz Boll | Switzerland | | | | |
| | 22 | Mitchell Davern | New Zealand | | | | |
| | 23 | Bendik Gjerdalen | Norway | | | | |
| | 24 | Carlos Garcia Knight | New Zealand | | | | |
| | 25 | Pedro Bidegain | Argentina | | | | |
| | 26 | Vlad Khadarin | Russia | | | | |
| | 27 | Seppe Smits | Belgium | | | | |
| | 28 | Roope Tonteri | Finland | | | | |

=== Heat 2 ===
| Rank | Bib | Name | Country | Run 1 | Run 2 | Best | Notes |
|---|---|---|---|---|---|---|---|
| | 1 | Red Gerard | United States | | | | |
| | 2 | Hiroaki Kunitake | Japan | | | | |
| | 3 | Chris Corning | United States | | | | |
| | 4 | Moritz Thönen | Switzerland | | | | |
| | 5 | Niek van der Velden | Netherlands | | | | |
| | 6 | Mark McMorris | Canada | | | | |
| | 7 | Tyler Nicholson | Canada | | | | |
| | 8 | Ruki Tobita | Japan | | | | |
| | 9 | Niklas Mattsson | Sweden | | | | |
| | 10 | Alberto Maffei | Italy | | | | |
| | 11 | Aleksi Nevakivi | Finland | | | | |
| | 12 | Stef Vandeweyer | Belgium | | | | |
| | 13 | Emiliano Lauzi | Italy | | | | |
| | 14 | Sebbe De Buck | Belgium | | | | |
| | 15 | Anthon Bosch | South Africa | | | | |
| | 16 | Kalle Järvilehto | Finland | | | | |
| | 17 | Matt McCormick | Great Britain | | | | |
| | 18 | Titouan Bartet | France | | | | |
| | 19 | Petr Horák | Czech Republic | | | | |
| | 20 | Nicolas Huber | Switzerland | | | | |
| | 21 | Naj Mekinc | Slovenia | | | | |
| | 22 | Yannick Boudjelal | Algeria | | | | |
| | 23 | Sebastien Konijnenberg | France | | | | |
| | 24 | Matthew Cox | Australia | | | | |
| | 25 | Markus Olimstad | Norway | | | | |
| | 26 | Iñaqui Irarrazaval | Chile | | | | |
| | 27 | Matías Schmitt | Argentina | | | | |
| | 28 | Stian Kleivdal | Norway | | | | |
