= FIS Freestyle Ski and Snowboarding World Championships 2019 – Men's snowboard slopestyle =

Men's snowboard slopestyle at the FIS Freestyle Ski and Snowboarding World Championships 2019
- Venue: Park City Mountain Resort
- Location: Utah, United States
- Dates: February 9–10
- Competitors: 58 from 23 nations
- Winning time: 93.25

Medalists
gold medal	Chris Corning	United States
silver medal	Mark McMorris	Canada
bronze medal	Judd Henkes	United States

The Men's snowboard slopestyle competition at the FIS Freestyle Ski and Snowboarding World Championships 2019 was held on February 9 and 10, 2019.

The final was cancelled due to weather conditions and the qualification results were used to determine the final ranking.

== Qualification ==
The qualifying rounds started on February 9, at 09:00. The three best snowboarders from each heat qualified for the final and the next five best snowboarders of each heat qualified for the semifinal.

=== Heat 1 ===
Rank	Bib	Name	Country	Run 1	Run 2	Best	Notes
1	5	Mark McMorris	Canada	51.75	93.00	93.00	F
2	4	Hiroaki Kunitake	Japan	89.75	28.50	89.75	F
3	6	Takeru Otsuka	Japan	89.50	34.25	89.50	F
4	8	Rene Rinnekangas	Finland	82.75	26.50	82.75	SF
5	3	Darcy Sharpe	Canada	80.25	53.75	80.25	SF
6	24	Sebbe De Buck	Belgium	78.00	13.25	78.00	SF
7	9	Mons Røisland	Norway	73.75	64.75	73.75	SF
8	7	Niklas Mattsson	Sweden	49.50	72.00	72.00	SF
9	10	Roope Tonteri	Finland	69.50	41.75	69.50	
10	11	Jamie Nicholls	Great Britain	62.00	69.25	69.25	
11	14	Carlos Garcia Knight	New Zealand	68.00	63.00	68.00	
12	17	Jonas Bösiger	Switzerland	46.25	64.50	64.50	
13	21	Emil Zulian	Italy	57.50	35.00	57.50	
14	26	Stian Kleivdal	Norway	41.75	53.00	53.00	
15	19	Mikhail Matveev	Russia	43.50	52.50	52.50	
16	23	Stef Vandeweyer	Belgium	47.00	18.75	47.00	
17	22	Casper Wolf	Netherlands	26.25	40.00	40.00	
18	12	Yang Wenlong	China	33.50	39.75	39.75	
19	1	Moritz Thönen	Switzerland	19.75	39.50	39.50	
20	27	Pedro Bidegain	Argentina	5.25	35.00	35.00	
21	18	Måns Hedberg	Sweden	29.00	21.50	29.00	
22	13	Kalle Järvilehto	Finland	12.75	24.75	24.75	
23	29	Sébastien Konijnenberg	France	17.25	2.25	17.25	
24	20	Ilias Van Hoof	Belgium	12.25	9.75	12.25	
25	16	Matías Schmitt	Argentina	12.00	10.25	12.00	
26	28	Loris Framarin	Italy	5.00	11.75	11.75	
27	15	Matt McCormick	Great Britain	7.25	10.00	10.00	
28	25	Anthon Bosch	South Africa	4.00	7.00	7.00	
—	2	Tyler Nicholson	Canada	Did not start			

=== Heat 2 ===
Rank	Bib	Name	Country	Run 1	Run 2	Best	Notes
1	3	Chris Corning	United States	38.00	93.25	93.25	F
2	6	Judd Henkes	United States	90.50	9.75	90.50	F
3	9	Niek van der Velden	Netherlands	80.50	87.50	87.50	F
4	7	Clemens Millauer	Austria	82.25	13.75	82.25	SF
5	5	Redmond Gerard	United States	81.25	23.75	81.25	SF
6	12	Michael Ciccarelli	Canada	31.50	80.25	80.25	SF
7	21	Sven Thorgren	Sweden	12.75	79.00	79.00	SF
8	16	Seppe Smits	Belgium	77.50	34.00	77.50	SF
9	14	Vlad Khadarin	Russia	66.00	13.00	66.00	
10	15	Aleksi Nevakivi	Finland	65.25	7.50	65.25	
11	20	Emiliano Lauzi	Italy	61.00	17.75	61.00	
12	24	Matthew Cox	Australia	53.75	60.00	60.00	
13	18	Rowan Coultas	Great Britain	16.75	58.50	58.50	
14	11	Petr Horák	Czech Republic	52.25	32.00	52.25	
15	19	Botond Fricz	Hungary	51.25	12.50	51.25	
16	30	Yuri Okubo	Japan	41.25	17.50	41.25	
17	8	Ruki Tobita	Japan	20.75	37.25	37.25	
18	23	Titouan Bartet	France	36.50	4.25	36.50	
19	29	Iñaqui Irarrázaval	Chile	15.00	31.00	31.00	
20	2	Nicolas Huber	Switzerland	30.50	27.25	30.50	
21	13	Naj Mekinc	Slovenia	18.00	27.00	27.00	
22	22	Gian Sutter	Switzerland	26.50	22.25	26.50	
23	10	Markus Olimstad	Norway	22.00	19.00	22.00	
24	25	Mitchell Davern	New Zealand	21.00	16.00	21.00	
25	28	Wang Liwen	China	4.00	20.00	20.00	
26	27	Sacha Moretti	France	9.75	14.75	14.75	
27	17	Brolin Mawejje	Uganda	13.25	5.25	13.25	
28	1	Lyon Farrell	United States	12.50	13.00	13.00	
29	26	Alberto Maffei	Italy	10.25	12.25	12.25	
30	4	Ståle Sandbech	Norway	4.75	DNS	4.75	

== Semifinal ==
The qualifying rounds started on February 9, at 12:10. The best four snowboarders qualified for the final.

Rank	Bib	Name	Country	Run 1	Run 2	Best	Notes
1	3	Mons Røisland	Norway	12.00	83.75	83.75	Q
2	5	Sebbe De Buck	Belgium	82.50	28.00	82.50	Q
3	10	Rene Rinnekangas	Finland	39.25	78.50	78.50	Q
4	7	Darcy Sharpe	Canada	75.75	26.75	75.75	Q
5	8	Redmond Gerard	United States	72.50	70.00	72.50	
6	2	Seppe Smits	Belgium	26.00	68.50	68.50	
7	9	Clemens Millauer	Austria	62.00	42.00	62.00	
8	1	Niklas Mattsson	Sweden	39.75	58.25	58.25	
9	6	Michael Ciccarelli	Canada	42.50	15.50	42.50	
10	4	Sven Thorgren	Sweden	7.50	33.75	33.75	

== Final ==
Rank	Bib	Name	Country	Run 1	Run 2	Run 3	Best	Notes
	1	Darcy Sharpe	Canada					
	2	Rene Rinnekangas	Finland					
	3	Sebbe De Buck	Belgium					
	4	Mons Røisland	Norway					
	5	Niek van der Velden	Netherlands					
	6	Takeru Otsuka	Japan					
	7	Hiroaki Kunitake	Japan					
	8	Judd Henkes	United States					
	9	Mark McMorris	Canada					
	10	Chris Corning	United States					
