= Snowboarding at the 2018 Winter Olympics – Men's big air =

Men's big air at the XXIII Olympic Winter Games
- Venue: Alpensia Ski Jumping Stadium
- Date: 21 February (qualification); 24 February (final)
- Competitors: 34 from 15 nations
- Winning score: 174.25

Medalists
1st place, gold medalist(s)		Sébastien Toutant	Canada
2nd place, silver medalist(s)		Kyle Mack	United States
3rd place, bronze medalist(s)		Billy Morgan	Great Britain

The men's big air competition of the 2018 Winter Olympics was held on 21 and 24 February 2018 at the Alpensia Ski Jumping Stadium in Pyeongchang, South Korea. The event was making its Olympic debut.

Due to a broken shoulder caused by a crash in training for the slopestyle, Niek van der Velden was not able to compete.

== Qualification ==
The top 40 athletes in the Olympic quota allocation list qualified (for both big air and slopestyle, the rankings were combined). This meant only a maximum of 40 could qualify across both events. A maximum of four athletes per National Olympic Committee (NOC) was allowed. All athletes qualifying must also have placed in the top 30 of a FIS World Cup event (in either big air or slopestyle) or the FIS Freestyle Ski and Snowboarding World Championships 2017 during the qualification period (1 July 2016 to 21 January 2018) and also have a minimum of 50 FIS points to compete. If the host country, South Korea, did not qualify, their chosen athlete would displace the last qualified athlete, granted all qualification criterion was met.

== Results ==
=== Key ===
Q — Qualified for the Final
DNS — Did Not Start
JNS — Jump Not Scored

==== Heat 1 ====
Rank	Order	Name	Country	Run 1	Run 2	Best	Notes
1	4	Maxence Parrot	Canada	89.25	92.50	92.50	Q
2	15	Niklas Mattsson	Sweden	53.75	90.00	90.00	Q
3	6	Kyle Mack	United States	87.25	88.75	88.75	Q
4	5	Chris Corning	United States	85.00	88.00	88.00	Q
5	11	Michael Schärer	Switzerland	87.00	44.00	87.00	Q
6	7	Redmond Gerard	United States	82.00	85.00	85.00	Q
7	3	Ståle Sandbech	Norway	84.75	41.25	84.75	
8	17	Rowan Coultas	Great Britain	81.00	84.50	84.50	
9	8	Yuri Okubo	Japan	84.25	44.25	84.25	
10	13	Rene Rinnekangas	Finland	43.75	83.00	83.00	
11	1	Jamie Nicholls	Great Britain	30.00	81.25	81.25	
12	9	Alberto Maffei	Italy	77.50	36.25	77.50	
13	16	Nicolas Huber	Switzerland	76.75	44.50	76.75	
14	14	Lee Min-sik	South Korea	68.75	72.25	72.25	
15	2	Seppe Smits	Belgium	50.00	59.25	59.25	
16	18	Clemens Millauer	Austria	39.25	47.00	47.00	
	10	Moritz Thönen	Switzerland	DNS			
	12	Petr Horák	Czech Republic	DNS			

==== Heat 2 ====
Rank	Order	Name	Country	Run 1	Run 2	Best	Notes
1	2	Carlos Garcia Knight	New Zealand	88.75	97.50	97.50	Q
2	8	Jonas Bösiger	Switzerland	96.00	35.25	96.00	Q
3	6	Mark McMorris	Canada	89.00	95.75	95.75	Q
4	4	Torgeir Bergrem	Norway	94.25	59.50	94.25	Q
5	7	Sébastien Toutant	Canada	91.00	45.00	91.00	Q
6	12	Billy Morgan	Great Britain	87.50	90.50	90.50	Q
7	16	Tyler Nicholson	Canada	87.25	89.25	89.25	
8	18	Peetu Piiroinen	Finland	43.50	87.25	87.25	
9	1	Roope Tonteri	Finland	86.50	47.50	86.50	
10	3	Marcus Kleveland	Norway	84.25	46.00	84.25	
11	17	Vlad Khadarin	Olympic Athletes from Russia	83.75	79.25	83.75	
12	5	Kalle Järvilehto	Finland	83.25	44.75	83.25	
13	13	Ryan Stassel	United States	39.50	76.25	76.25	
14	10	Stef Vandeweyer	Belgium	61.00	29.50	61.00	
15	14	Matías Schmitt	Argentina	51.75	23.00	51.75	
16	15	Anton Mamaev	Olympic Athletes from Russia	29.00	42.75	42.75	
17	11	Hiroaki Kunitake	Japan	37.25	36.75	37.25	
18	9	Sebbe De Buck	Belgium	33.50	30.25	33.50	

=== Final ===
The final was held on 24 February 2018.

Rank	Order	Name	Country	Run 1	Run 2	Run 3	Total	Notes
1st place, gold medalist(s)	4	Sébastien Toutant	Canada	84.75	89.50	JNS	174.25	
2nd place, silver medalist(s)	7	Kyle Mack	United States	82.00	86.75	JNS	168.75	
3rd place, bronze medalist(s)	2	Billy Morgan	Great Britain	JNS	82.50	85.50	168.00	
4	5	Chris Corning	United States	74.25	78.75	JNS	153.00	
5	1	Redmond Gerard	United States	74.75	JNS	68.25	143.00	
6	3	Michael Schärer	Switzerland	JNS	62.25	78.50	140.75	
7	6	Torgeir Bergrem	Norway	88.50	42.50	JNS	131.00	
8	10	Jonas Bösiger	Switzerland	77.50	JNS	40.75	118.25	
9	11	Maxence Parrot	Canada	85.00	JNS	32.75	117.75	
10	8	Mark McMorris	Canada	40.50	JNS	32.00	72.50	
11	12	Carlos Garcia Knight	New Zealand	JNS	JNS	54.25	54.25	
12	9	Niklas Mattsson	Sweden	36.00	DNS	DNS	36.00	
