= Snowboarding at the 2018 Winter Olympics – Men's slopestyle =

Men's slopestyle at the XXIII Olympic Winter Games
- Venue: Bogwang Phoenix Park
- Date: 10 February (qualification); 11 February (final)
- Competitors: 37 from 16 nations
- Winning points: 87.16

Medalists
1st place, gold medalist(s)		Redmond Gerard	United States
2nd place, silver medalist(s)		Maxence Parrot	Canada
3rd place, bronze medalist(s)		Mark McMorris	Canada

The men's slopestyle competition of the 2018 Winter Olympics was held on 10 and 11 February 2018 at the Bogwang Phoenix Park in Pyeongchang, South Korea.

== Summary ==
Due to a broken shoulder caused by a crash in training, Niek van der Velden was not able to compete. Then Norwegian snowboarder Mons Røisland, who was considered a possible medal contender, broke a chest bone and tore ligaments in a crash during practice prior to the finals, which made him unable to compete.

Eleven months after the Canadian Mark McMorris ended up in a coma, he won the Olympic bronze medal.

In the victory ceremony, the medals were presented by Pierre-Olivier Beckers-Vieujant, member of the International Olympic Committee accompanied by Dexter Paine, FIS vice president.

== Schedule ==
All times are (UTC+9).

Date	Time	Round
10 February	10:00	Qualification
11 February	10:00	Final

== Qualification ==
The top 40 athletes in the Olympic quota allocation list qualified (for both big air and slopestyle, the rankings were combined). This meant only a maximum of 40 could qualify across both events. A maximum of four athletes per National Olympic Committee (NOC) was allowed. All athletes qualifying must also have placed in the top 30 of a FIS World Cup event or the FIS Freestyle Ski and Snowboarding World Championships 2017 during the qualification period (July 1, 2016 to January 21, 2018) and also have a minimum of 50 FIS points to compete. If the host country, South Korea, did not qualify, their chosen athlete would displace the last qualified athlete, granted all qualification criterion was met.

== Results ==
=== Key ===
Q — Qualified for the Final
DNS — Did Not Start

==== Heat 1 ====
Rank	Order	Name	Country	Run 1	Run 2	Best	Notes
1	5	Marcus Kleveland	Norway	83.71	32.30	83.71	Q
2	6	Carlos Garcia Knight	New Zealand	80.10	40.20	80.10	Q
3	4	Sebastien Toutant	Canada	78.01	45.06	78.01	Q
4	7	Mons Røisland	Norway	76.50	43.68	76.50	Q
5	2	Torgeir Bergrem	Norway	45.80	75.45	75.45	Q
6	17	Niklas Mattsson	Sweden	50.81	73.53	73.53	Q
7	11	Roope Tonteri	Finland	72.60	38.08	72.60	
8	8	Jamie Nicholls	Great Britain	71.56	36.90	71.56	
9	1	Chris Corning	United States	70.85	69.86	70.85	
10	13	Peetu Piiroinen	Finland	69.26	43.43	69.26	
11	19	Vlad Khadarin	Olympic Athletes from Russia	23.05	64.16	64.16	
12	3	Sebbe De Buck	Belgium	59.40	29.58	59.40	
13	15	Rene Rinnekangas	Finland	24.86	37.91	37.91	
14	16	Michael Schärer	Switzerland	37.61	27.01	37.61	
15	18	Kalle Järvilehto	Finland	15.56	31.10	31.10	
16	14	Moritz Thönen	Switzerland	19.53	23.55	23.55	
17	9	Ryan Stassel	United States	23.50	22.63	23.50	
	10	Lee Min-sik	South Korea	DNS			
	12	Niek van der Velden	Netherlands	DNS			

==== Heat 2 ====
Rank	Order	Name	Country	Run 1	Run 2	Best	Notes
1	8	Maxence Parrot	Canada	83.45	87.36	87.36	Q
2	3	Mark McMorris	Canada	83.70	86.83	86.83	Q
3	5	Redmond Gerard	United States	82.55	57.11	82.55	Q
4	2	Ståle Sandbech	Norway	74.11	82.13	82.13	Q
5	1	Tyler Nicholson	Canada	17.41	79.21	79.21	Q
6	4	Seppe Smits	Belgium	78.36	41.48	78.36	Q
7	17	Clemens Millauer	Austria	75.65	77.45	77.45	
8	14	Yuri Okubo	Japan	24.45	75.05	75.05	
9	12	Jonas Bösiger	Switzerland	18.68	58.26	58.26	
10	11	Billy Morgan	Great Britain	56.40	37.55	56.40	
11	6	Kyle Mack	United States	45.26	53.55	53.55	
12	9	Matias Schmitt	Argentina	50.86	20.68	50.86	
13	15	Måns Hedberg	Sweden	46.25	DNS	46.25	
14	7	Hiroaki Kunitake	Japan	39.45	43.16	43.16	
15	18	Petr Horák	Czech Republic	41.93	39.05	41.93	
16	16	Nicolas Huber	Switzerland	34.25	36.90	36.90	
17	13	Stef Vandeweyer	Belgium	33.75	21.16	33.75	
18	10	Rowan Coultas	Great Britain	23.20	23.58	23.58	

=== Final ===
The final was started at 11:04.

Rank	Order	Name	Country	Run 1	Run 2	Run 3	Best	Notes
1st place, gold medalist(s)	8	Redmond Gerard	United States	43.33	46.40	87.16	87.16	
2nd place, silver medalist(s)	12	Maxence Parrot	Canada	45.13	49.48	86.00	86.00	
3rd place, bronze medalist(s)	10	Mark McMorris	Canada	75.30	85.20	60.68	85.20	
4	6	Ståle Sandbech	Norway	44.81	81.01	38.13	81.01	
5	9	Carlos Garcia Knight	New Zealand	78.60	52.98	24.35	78.60	
6	11	Marcus Kleveland	Norway	77.76	43.71	37.18	77.76	
7	4	Tyler Nicholson	Canada	36.18	76.41	76.15	76.41	
8	3	Torgeir Bergrem	Norway	58.80	75.80	60.03	75.80	
9	1	Niklas Mattsson	Sweden	38.43	74.71	42.48	74.71	
10	2	Seppe Smits	Belgium	31.11	69.03	66.18	69.03	
11	7	Sebastien Toutant	Canada	33.66	57.23	61.08	61.08	
12	5	Mons Røisland	Norway	DNS				
