= FIS Freestyle Ski and Snowboarding World Championships 2017 – Men's big air =

The men's snowboard big air competition of the FIS Freestyle Ski and Snowboarding World Championships 2017 was held at Sierra Nevada, Spain on March 16 (qualifying) and March 17 (finals). 67 athletes from 28 countries competed.

== Qualification ==
The following are the results of the qualification.

=== Heat 1 ===
| Rank | Bib | Name | Country | Run 1 | Run 2 | Best | Notes |
|---|---|---|---|---|---|---|---|
| 1 | 4 | Roope Tonteri | Finland | 92.00 | 14.33 | 92.00 | Q |
| 2 | 1 | Chris Corning | United States | 89.00 | 90.33 | 90.33 | Q |
| 3 | 17 | Lyon Farrell | United States | 85.00 | 86.66 | 86.66 | Q |
| 4 | 14 | Kalle Järvilehto | Finland | 19.66 | 82.00 | 82.00 | SF |
| 5 | 5 | Jonas Bösiger | Switzerland | 80.00 | 21.00 | 80.00 | SF |
| 6 | 26 | Ståle Sandbech | Norway | 78.00 | 64.00 | 78.00 | SF |
| 7 | 14 | Fridtjof Tischendorf | Norway | 75.00 | 25.33 | 75.00 | SF |
| 8 | 35 | Stef Vandeweyer | Belgium | 73.33 | 29.00 | 73.33 | SF |
| 9 | 39 | Francis Jobin | Canada | 27.66 | 71.00 | 71.00 | |
| 10 | 9 | Mons Røisland | Norway | 70.66 | 8.00 | 70.66 | |
| 11 | 13 | Ville Paumola | Finland | 67.66 | 24.00 | 67.66 | |
| 12 | 29 | Philipp Kundratitz | Austria | 65.33 | 43.66 | 65.33 | |
| 13 | 38 | Emil Zulian | Italy | 60.00 | 44.66 | 60.00 | |
| 14 | 54 | Sacha Moretti | France | 56.00 | 17.33 | 56.00 | |
| 15 | 42 | Matías Schmitt | Argentina | 51.33 | 55.66 | 55.66 | |
| 16 | 33 | Nicola Dioli | Italy | 53.33 | 5.00 | 53.33 | |
| 17 | 59 | Ludvig Biltoft | Sweden | 13.33 | 47.66 | 47.66 | |
| 18 | 21 | Sébastien Konijnenberg | France | 22.33 | 39.00 | 39.00 | |
| 19 | 55 | Jan Nečas | Czech Republic | 28.66 | 35.00 | 35.00 | |
| 20 | 22 | Carlos Gerber | Switzerland | 26.33 | 34.66 | 34.66 | |
| 21 | 69 | Feng Changjun | China | 33.00 | 4.33 | 33.00 | |
| 22 | 62 | Kim Ka-hyun | South Korea | 30.66 | 2.33 | 30.66 | |
| 23 | 63 | Nicolas Huber | Switzerland | 17.66 | 30.33 | 30.33 | |
| 24 | 68 | Jaba Skhvediani | Georgia | 10.33 | 25.66 | 25.66 | |
| 24 | 66 | Alberto Maffei | Italy | 21.33 | 25.66 | 25.66 | |
| 26 | 47 | Mikko Rehnberg | Finland | 23.33 | 7.33 | 23.33 | |
| 27 | 50 | Daniel Porkert | Czech Republic | 16.33 | 21.00 | 21.00 | |
| 28 | 43 | Niek van der Velden | Netherlands | 20.33 | 19.66 | 20.33 | |
| 29 | 30 | Rene Rinnekangas | Finland | 16.66 | 15.66 | 16.66 | |
| 30 | 58 | Diego Cerón | Chile | 11.00 | 7.33 | 11.00 | |
| | 8 | Billy Morgan | Great Britain | DNS | DNS | DNS | |
| | 51 | Aleix López | Spain | DNS | DNS | DNS | |
| | 25 | Rowan Coultas | Great Britain | DNS | DNS | DNS | |

=== Heat 2 ===
| Rank | Bib | Name | Country | Run 1 | Run 2 | Best | Notes |
|---|---|---|---|---|---|---|---|
| 1 | 15 | Sven Thorgren | Sweden | 86.66 | 96.33 | 96.33 | Q |
| 2 | 12 | Niklas Mattsson | Sweden | 23.66 | 94.33 | 94.33 | Q |
| 3 | 2 | Marcus Kleveland | Norway | 92.33 | 26.00 | 92.33 | Q |
| 4 | 71 | Clemens Schattschneider | Austria | 80.33 | 86.66 | 86.66 | SF |
| 5 | 11 | Anton Mamaev | Russia | 83.00 | DNS | 83.00 | SF |
| 6 | 27 | Clemens Millauer | Austria | 77.00 | 80.66 | 80.66 | SF |
| 7 | 24 | Judd Henkes | United States | 15.00 | 78.33 | 78.33 | SF |
| 8 | 28 | Måns Hedberg | Sweden | 68.66 | 74.66 | 74.66 | SF |
| 9 | 7 | Vlad Khadarin | Russia | 71.66 | 32.33 | 71.66 | |
| 10 | 31 | Carlos Garcia Knight | New Zealand | 71.00 | 16.00 | 71.00 | |
| 11 | 48 | Petr Horák | Czech Republic | 65.00 | 7.00 | 65.00 | |
| 12 | 20 | Tiarn Collins | New Zealand | 19.66 | 64.66 | 64.66 | |
| 13 | 40 | Enzo Valax | France | 62.66 | 63.66 | 63.66 | |
| 14 | 32 | Davide Boggio | Italy | 11.33 | 62.33 | 62.33 | |
| 15 | 57 | Matthew McCormick | Great Britain | 60.66 | 11.66 | 60.66 | |
| 16 | 37 | Tim-Kevin Ravnjak | Slovenia | 60.00 | 16.00 | 60.00 | |
| 17 | 61 | Samuel Jaroš | Slovakia | 58.00 | 12.33 | 58.00 | |
| 18 | 56 | Anthon Bosch | South Africa | 44.66 | 57.66 | 57.66 | |
| 19 | 49 | Federico Chiaradio | Argentina | 57.33 | 10.00 | 57.33 | |
| 20 | 60 | Maximilian Preissinger | Austria | 54.33 | 38.33 | 54.33 | |
| 21 | 41 | Iñaqui Irarrázaval | Chile | 13.00 | 50.66 | 50.66 | |
| 22 | 16 | Sebbe De Buck | Belgium | 17.66 | 31.66 | 31.66 | |
| 23 | 6 | Jamie Nicholls | Great Britain | 15.33 | 23.33 | 23.33 | |
| 24 | 3 | Seppe Smits | Belgium | 21.00 | 22.00 | 22.00 | |
| 25 | 36 | Michael Schärer | Switzerland | 19.00 | 21.00 | 21.00 | |
| 26 | 45 | Mikhail Matveev | Russia | 11.00 | 15.66 | 15.66 | |
| 27 | 52 | José Antonio Aragón | Spain | 14.00 | DNS | 14.00 | |
| 28 | 19 | Dylan Thomas | United States | 9.33 | 11.66 | 11.66 | |
| 29 | 23 | Mathias Weissenbacher | Austria | 10.33 | 7.33 | 10.33 | |
| 30 | 64 | Piotr Tokarczyk | Poland | 7.66 | 8.66 | 8.66 | |
| 31 | 70 | Hui Yining | China | 5.00 | 6.33 | 6.33 | |
| | 53 | Martín Jaureguialzo | Argentina | DNS | DNS | DNS | |
| | 67 | Matthew Cox | Australia | DNS | DNS | DNS | |
| | 44 | Toms Petrusevičs | Latvia | DNS | DNS | DNS | |

== Semi-final ==
The following are the results of the semi-final.

| Rank | Bib | Name | Country | Run 1 | Run 2 | Best | Notes |
|---|---|---|---|---|---|---|---|
| 1 | 14 | Kalle Järvilehto | Finland | 91.75 | 33.50 | 91.75 | Q |
| 2 | 5 | Jonas Bösiger | Switzerland | 89.00 | 42.25 | 89.00 | Q |
| 3 | 26 | Ståle Sandbech | Norway | 81.75 | 86.25 | 86.25 | Q |
| 4 | 71 | Clemens Schattschneider | Austria | 28.00 | 85.00 | 85.00 | Q |
| 5 | 28 | Måns Hedberg | Sweden | 40.00 | 77.00 | 77.00 | |
| 6 | 18 | Fridtjof Tischendorf | Norway | 76.50 | 27.25 | 76.50 | |
| 7 | 11 | Anton Mamaev | Russia | 24.00 | 73.50 | 73.50 | |
| 8 | 24 | Judd Henkes | United States | 36.50 | 70.50 | 70.50 | |
| 9 | 35 | Stef Vandeweyer | Belgium | 49.25 | 41.50 | 49.25 | |
| 10 | 27 | Clemens Millauer | Austria | 10.00 | 3.50 | 10.00 | |

== Final ==
The following are the results of the finals.

| Rank | Bib | Name | Country | Run 1 | Run 2 | Run 3 | 2 Best |
|---|---|---|---|---|---|---|---|
| 1st place, gold medalist(s) | 26 | Ståle Sandbech | Norway | 86.25 | 92.00 | 96.25 | 188.25 |
| 2nd place, silver medalist(s) | 1 | Chris Corning | United States | JNS | 91.75 | 91.00 | 182.75 |
| 3rd place, bronze medalist(s) | 2 | Marcus Kleveland | Norway | 92.75 | JNS | 84.50 | 177.25 |
| 4 | 4 | Roope Tonteri | Finland | 80.75 | JNS | 89.00 | 169.75 |
| 5 | 14 | Kalle Jarvilehto | Finland | JNS | 87.50 | 41.75 | 129.25 |
| 6 | 15 | Sven Thorgren | Sweden | JNS | 93.75 | 30.00 | 123.75 |
| 7 | 17 | Lyon Farrell | United States | 89.25 | JNS | 31.75 | 121.00 |
| 8 | 5 | Jonas Bösiger | Switzerland | JNS | 35.25 | 75.00 | 110.25 |
| 9 | 12 | Niklas Mattsson | Sweden | JNS | 27.75 | 17.75 | 45.50 |
| 10 | 71 | Clemens Schattschneider | Austria | JNS | 31.25 | 10.00 | 41.25 |
