= FIS Freestyle Ski and Snowboarding World Championships 2017 – Men's snowboard slopestyle =

International snowboarding competition in Spain

The men's snowboard slopestyle competition of the FIS Freestyle Ski and Snowboarding World Championships 2017 was held at Sierra Nevada, Spain on March 9 (qualifying) and March 11 (finals). 62 athletes from 29 countries competed.

== Qualification ==
The following are the results of the qualification.

=== Heat 1 ===
Rank	Bib	Name	Country	Run 1	Run 2	Best	Notes
1	9	Måns Hedberg	Sweden	76.75	90.25	90.25	Q
2	4	Ville Paumola	Finland	88.00	85.75	88.00	Q
3	1	Seppe Smits	Belgium	15.00	86.00	86.00	Q
4	69	Clemens Schattschneider	Austria	27.50	82.00	82.00	Q
5	16	Niklas Mattsson	Sweden	77.50	27.75	77.50	Q
6	25	Fridtjof Tischendorf	Norway	57.75	77.25	77.25	Q
7	5	Sebbe De Buck	Belgium	74.00	25.75	74.00	Q
8	8	Dylan Thomas	United States	20.50	71.75	71.75	Q
9	17	Davide Boggio	Italy	14.00	71.50	71.50	
10	12	Kalle Jarvilehto	Finland	10.00	71.25	71.25	
11	46	Mikhail Matveev	Russia	24.75	69.75	69.75	
12	20	Petr Horák	Czech Republic	15.25	65.75	65.75	
13	51	Ludvig Biltoft	Sweden	63.75	14.75	63.75	
14	32	Matthew McCormick	Great Britain	62.25	29.50	62.25	
15	24	Lyon Farrell	United States	43.50	56.75	56.75	
16	28	Sébastien Konijnenberg	France	55.75	25.25	55.75	
17	33	Emiliano Lauzi	Italy	53.00	13.00	53.00	
18	42	Martin Jaureguialzo	Argentina	30.50	52.25	52.25	
19	57	Samuel Jaroš	Slovakia	46.75	16.00	46.75	
20	37	Emil Zulian	Italy	41.50	15.25	41.50	
21	45	Federico Chiaradio	Argentina	37.75	19.75	37.75	
22	13	Judd Henkes	United States	37.00	25.50	37.00	
23	21	Michael Schärer	Switzerland	12.25	36.50	36.50	
24	41	Boris Mouton	Switzerland	35.50	8.25	35.50	
25	70	Jaba Skhvediani	Georgia	27.75	10.00	27.75	
26	29	Simon Gschaider	Austria	24.00	22.00	24.00	
27	36	Mikko Rehnberg	Finland	23.00	22.25	23.00	
28	56	Stef Vandeweyer	Belgium	9.50	18.75	18.75	
29	50	Jose Antonio Aragon	Spain	8.25	16.25	16.25	
30	61	Inaqui Irarrazabal	Chile	2.50	DNS	2.50	
	62	Matthew Cox	Australia	DNS	DNS	DNS	

=== Heat 2 ===
Rank	Bib	Name	Country	Run 1	Run 2	Best	Notes
1	11	Carlos Garcia Knight	New Zealand	17.50	94.25	94.25	Q
2	3	Tiarn Collins	New Zealand	88.75	9.00	88.75	Q
3	6	Chris Corning	United States	84.00	62.00	84.00	Q
4	53	Nicolas Huber	Switzerland	69.75	79.25	79.25	Q
5	35	Francis Jobin	Canada	73.75	16.50	73.75	Q
6	15	Rene Rinnekangas	Finland	13.50	73.00	73.00	Q
7	7	Billy Morgan	Great Britain	72.00	8.25	72.00	Q
8	22	Vlad Khadarin	Russia	62.50	68.50	68.50	Q
9	19	Tim-Kevin Ravnjak	Slovenia	66.00	8.00	66.00	
10	27	Jonas Bösinger	Switzerland	59.25	56.25	59.25	
11	65	Lee Min-sik	South Korea	19.75	58.25	58.25	
12	14	Clemens Millauer	Austria	53.50	11.00	53.50	
13	23	Matias Schmitt	Argentina	42.50	5.75	42.50	
14	18	Isak Ulstein	Norway	42.25	2.00	42.25	
15	34	Alberto Maffei	Italy	37.75	41.50	41.50	
16	2	Jamie Nicholls	Great Britain	38.00	15.75	38.00	
17	10	Rowan Coultas	Great Britain	30.50	37.00	37.00	
18	43	Bendik Gjerdalen	Norway	4.25	27.25	27.25	
19	26	Niek van der Velden	Netherlands	25.50	18.50	25.50	
20	30	Maximilian Preissinger	Austria	13.00	24.25	24.25	
21	59	Anthon Bosch	South Africa	23.75	7.00	23.75	
22	44	Jan Nečas	Czech Republic	21.75	20.25	21.75	
23	38	Daniel Porkert	Czech Republic	8.75	18.25	18.25	
24	52	Petar Gyosharkov	Bulgaria	7.50	17.75	17.75	
25	47	Siim Aunison	Estonia	17.00	4.50	17.00	
26	58	Tit Štante	Slovenia	4.00	11.50	11.50	
27	64	Gustaf Lundström	Sweden	2.00	11.25	11.25	
28	72	Hui Yining	China	1.75	8.00	8.00	
29	31	Toms Petrusevics	Latvia	1.00	7.75	7.75	
30	49	Mathias Ekhoff	Norway	4.50	2.50	4.50	
	39	Aleix López	Spain	DNS	DNS	DNS	

== Final ==
The following are the results of the finals.

Rank	Bib	Name	Country	Run 1	Run 2	Best
1st place, gold medalist(s)	1	Seppe Smits	Belgium	45.50	91.40	91.40
2nd place, silver medalist(s)	53	Nicolas Huber	Switzerland	83.25	43.90	83.25
3rd place, bronze medalist(s)	6	Chris Corning	United States	82.50	28.10	82.50
4	5	Sebbe De Buck	Belgium	81.20	78.80	81.20
5	4	Ville Paumola	Finland	77.50	23.25	77.50
6	16	Niklas Mattsson	Sweden	74.85	18.05	74.85
7	11	Carlos Garcia Knight	New Zealand	74.40	25.70	74.40
8	3	Tiarn Collins	New Zealand	69.75	71.75	71.75
9	9	Måns Hedberg	Sweden	32.25	69.70	69.70
10	8	Dylan Thomas	United States	68.60	37.90	68.60
11	35	Francis Jobin	Canada	66.60	17.60	66.60
12	69	Clemens Schattschneider	Austria	52.20	36.15	52.20
13	7	Billy Morgan	Great Britain	38.60	16.50	38.60
14	15	Rene Rinnekangas	Finland	25.50	32.00	32.00
15	25	Fridtjof Tischendorf	Norway	22.55	26.10	26.10
16	22	Vlad Khadarin	Russia	21.00	19.85	21.00
