= Snowboarding at the 2022 Winter Olympics – Men's big air =

Men's big air at the XXIV Olympic Winter Games
- Snowboarding
- Venue: Big Air Shougang, Beijing
- Date: 14, 15 February
- Competitors: 29 from 14 nations
- Winning time: 182.50

Medalists
1st place, gold medalist(s)		Su Yiming	China
2nd place, silver medalist(s)		Mons Røisland	Norway
3rd place, bronze medalist(s)		Max Parrot	Canada

The men's big air competition in snowboarding at the 2022 Winter Olympics was held on 14 February (qualification) and 15 February (final), at the Big Air Shougang in Beijing. Su Yiming of China won the event, his first Olympic gold medal. Mons Røisland of Norway won silver, his first Olympic medal, and Max Parrot of Canada won bronze.

The defending champion was Sébastien Toutant. He was competing but did not make it to the final. Neither the 2018 silver medalist, Kyle Mack, nor the bronze medalist, Billy Morgan, qualified for the Olympics. At the 2021–22 FIS Snowboard World Cup, only two big air events were held before the Olympics, won by Jonas Bösiger and Su Yiming. Mark McMorris was also the 2021 world champion, with Parrot and Marcus Kleveland being the silver and bronze medalists, respectively. Kleveland was 2019 X-Games winner, ahead of Sven Thorgren and Røisland.

== Qualification ==
A total of 30 snowboarders qualified to compete at the games. For an athlete to compete, they must have a minimum of 50.00 FIS points in Big Air or Slopestyle on the FIS Points List on January 17, 2022, and a top 30 finish in a World Cup event in Big Air or slopestyle or at the FIS Snowboard World Championships 2021. A country could enter a maximum of four athletes into the event.

== Results ==
=== Qualification ===
Q — Qualified for the Final

The top 12 athletes in the qualifiers advanced to the Final.

Rank	Bib	Order	Name	Country	Run 1	Run 2	Run 3	Total	Notes
1	1	1	Max Parrot	Canada	78.25	86.50	26.50	164.75	Q
2	3	5	Takeru Otsuka	Japan	68.50	75.50	91.50	160.00	Q
3	2	3	Red Gerard	United States	75.50	80.00	78.75	158.75	Q
4	27	9	Hiroaki Kunitake	Japan	83.75	61.50	74.50	158.25	Q
5	23	8	Su Yiming	China	92.50	62.75	28.00	155.25	Q
6	4	4	Marcus Kleveland	Norway	87.75	63.75	61.25	151.50	Q
7	9	17	Sven Thorgren	Sweden	80.75	70.25	33.75	151.00	Q
8	6	27	Mark McMorris	Canada	81.50	65.75	65.75	147.25	Q
9	10	7	Mons Røisland	Norway	31.25	80.00	66.50	146.50	Q
10	5	2	Chris Corning	United States	64.25	17.50	81.75	146.00	Q
11	19	19	Niek van der Velden	Netherlands	79.00	60.00	63.75	142.75	Q
12	13	14	Darcy Sharpe	Canada	29.00	77.50	64.50	142.00	Q
13	14	28	Rene Rinnekangas	Finland	78.75	12.25	60.75	139.50	
14	12	22	Nicolas Huber	Switzerland	64.25	75.00	24.75	139.25	
15	25	11	Kaito Hamada	Japan	80.75	41.75	55.75	136.50	
16	28	18	Ståle Sandbech	Norway	69.50	15.50	66.50	136.00	
17	11	21	Sean FitzSimons	United States	53.25	68.75	16.25	122.00	
18	17	29	Kalle Järvilehto	Finland	22.75	85.75	22.00	107.75	
19	30	24	Vlad Khadarin	ROC	67.00	37.25	30.00	104.25	
20	24	12	Niklas Mattsson	Sweden	18.50	80.75	21.75	102.50	
21	8	26	Dusty Henricksen	United States	23.00	72.75	20.75	93.50	
22	29	6	Emiliano Lauzi	Italy	23.50	80.75	12.25	93.00	
23	18	13	Tiarn Collins	New Zealand	71.25	14.25	21.25	92.50	
24	26	20	Noah Vicktor	Germany	60.50	18.25	29.75	90.25	
25	20	25	Leon Vockensperger	Germany	66.00	24.00	17.25	90.00	
26	7	15	Sébastien Toutant	Canada	67.00	22.50	11.25	89.50	
27	21	23	Jonas Bösiger	Switzerland	60.00	9.50	15.75	75.75	
28	22	16	Matthew Cox	Australia	56.25	19.00	13.75	70.00	
29	15	10	Ruki Tobita	Japan	25.75	16.25	20.25	46.00	

=== Final ===
Rank	Bib	Order	Name	Country	Run 1	Run 2	Run 3	Total
1st place, gold medalist(s)	23	8	Su Yiming	China	89.50	93.00	33.00	182.50
2nd place, silver medalist(s)	10	4	Mons Røisland	Norway	89.25	75.75	82.50	171.75
3rd place, bronze medalist(s)	1	12	Max Parrot	Canada	28.25	94.00	76.25	170.25
4	27	9	Hiroaki Kunitake	Japan	82.25	50.25	84.00	166.25
5	2	10	Red Gerard	United States	82.50	19.25	83.25	165.75
6	19	2	Niek van der Velden	Netherlands	83.75	78.25	26.75	162.00
7	5	3	Chris Corning	United States	92.00	35.50	64.00	156.00
8	4	7	Marcus Kleveland	Norway	87.75	62.25	39.00	150.00
9	3	11	Takeru Otsuka	Japan	17.25	95.00	33.75	128.75
10	6	5	Mark McMorris	Canada	80.50	21.00	33.25	113.75
11	9	6	Sven Thorgren	Sweden	25.25	67.00	21.50	88.50
12	13	1	Darcy Sharpe	Canada	20.00	82.00	5.75	87.75
