= Snowboarding at the 2022 Winter Olympics – Men's slopestyle =

Men's slopestyle at the XXIV Olympic Winter Games
- Snowboarding
- Venue: Genting Snow Park, Zhangjiakou
- Date: 6, 7 February
- Competitors: 30 from 15 nations
- Winning points: 90.96

Medalists
1st place, gold medalist(s)		Max Parrot	Canada
2nd place, silver medalist(s)		Su Yiming	China
3rd place, bronze medalist(s)		Mark McMorris	Canada

The men's slopestyle competition in snowboarding at the 2022 Winter Olympics was held on 6 February (qualification) and 7 February (final), at the Genting Snow Park in Zhangjiakou. Max Parrot of Canada became the Olympic champion. Su Yiming of China won the silver medal, whereas Mark McMorris of Canada replicated his success at the 2014 and 2018 Olympics by winning the bronze. For Parrot this is the first Olympic gold, and for Su the first Olympic medal. The scoring in the finals was mired in controversy after the judges admitted to missing a "glaring error" by Parrot that some speculate would have given Su Yiming the gold medal. The head snowboarding judge, Iztok Sumatic, later stated in an interview that the final scores was wrong due to the judging error, and that Su should have won the gold instead. However, because neither McMorris nor Su filed an official appeal, it had meant that the flawed results will not be changed.

== Summary ==
The defending champion was Red Gerard. The 2018 silver medalist, Max Parrot, and the bronze medalist, Mark McMorris, qualified at the Olympics as well. At the 2021–22 FIS Snowboard World Cup, only three slopestyle events were held before the Olympics. Sébastien Toutant was leading the ranking, followed by Niek van der Velden and Su Yiming. Marcus Kleveland is the 2021 world champion, with Toutant and Rene Rinnekangas being the silver and bronze medalists, respectively. Dusty Henricksen is also the 2019 X-Games winner, ahead of Mons Røisland and Rinnekangas.

== Qualification ==
A total of 30 snowboarders qualified to compete at the games. For an athlete to compete they must have a minimum of 50.00 FIS points in Big Air or Slopestyle on the FIS Points List on January 17, 2022, and a top 30 finish in a World Cup event in Big Air or slopestyle or at the FIS Snowboard World Championships 2021. A country could enter a maximum of four athletes into the event.

== Results ==
=== Qualification ===
Q — Qualified for the Final

The top 12 athletes in the qualifiers advanced to the Final.

Rank	Bib	Order	Name	Country	Run 1	Run 2	Best	Notes
1	16	28	Su Yiming	China	86.80	41.93	86.80	Q
2	3	4	Mark McMorris	Canada	62.70	83.30	83.30	Q
3	8	17	Sean FitzSimons	United States	78.76	26.75	78.76	Q
4	21	15	Ståle Sandbech	Norway	70.11	78.61	78.61	Q
5	1	1	Redmond Gerard	United States	78.20	43.95	78.20	Q
6	17	26	Takeru Otsuka	Japan	32.93	74.93	74.93	Q
7	25	19	Emiliano Lauzi	Italy	71.71	47.76	71.71	Q
8	4	2	Sébastien Toutant	Canada	23.68	71.06	71.06	Q
9	7	10	Mons Røisland	Norway	70.96	41.41	70.96	Q
10	11	13	Max Parrot	Canada	70.11	36.68	70.11	Q
11	6	21	Chris Corning	United States	48.48	69.30	69.30	Q
12	19	6	Kaito Hamada	Japan	56.06	67.45	67.45	Q
13	10	9	Rene Rinnekangas	Finland	67.10	60.10	67.10	
14	2	5	Marcus Kleveland	Norway	37.28	64.86	64.86	
15	27	18	Vlad Khadarin	ROC	64.73	21.15	64.73	
16	23	8	Noah Vicktor	Germany	16.66	62.56	62.56	
17	5	3	Dusty Henricksen	United States	37.46	58.46	58.46	
18	12	11	Tiarn Collins	New Zealand	58.36	29.21	58.36	
19	24	27	Ruki Tobita	Japan	29.23	56.58	56.58	
20	22	20	Nicolas Huber	Switzerland	50.46	54.58	54.58	
21	20	14	Hiroaki Kunitake	Japan	50.36	51.43	51.43	
22	13	12	Niek van der Velden	Netherlands	26.51	46.03	46.03	
23	9	29	Darcy Sharpe	Canada	45.46	25.15	45.46	
24	18	25	Sven Thorgren	Sweden	40.73	34.71	40.73	
25	30	22	Jonas Bösiger	Switzerland	40.11	17.58	40.11	
26	15	24	Matthew Cox	Australia	34.46	39.98	39.98	
27	28	16	Clemens Millauer	Austria	38.71	32.06	38.71	
28	26	23	Kalle Järvilehto	Finland	15.06	28.73	28.73	
29	14	7	Leon Vockensperger	Germany	25.15	26.41	26.41	
30	29	30	Niklas Mattsson	Sweden	24.18	20.55	24.18	

=== Final ===
Rank	Bib	Order	Name	Country	Run 1	Run 2	Run 3	Best
1st place, gold medalist(s)	11	3	Max Parrot	Canada	79.86	90.96	36.56	90.96
2nd place, silver medalist(s)	16	12	Su Yiming	China	78.38	88.70	66.58	88.70
3rd place, bronze medalist(s)	3	11	Mark McMorris	Canada	76.98	80.85	88.53	88.53
4	1	8	Redmond Gerard	United States	83.25	71.86	28.65	83.25
5	25	6	Emiliano Lauzi	Italy	80.01	27.48	39.48	80.01
6	6	2	Chris Corning	United States	31.58	20.78	65.11	65.11
7	7	4	Mons Røisland	Norway	29.01	63.33	52.53	63.33
8	19	1	Kaito Hamada	Japan	25.90	15.91	59.36	59.36
9	4	5	Sébastien Toutant	Canada	52.63	30.40	54.00	54.00
10	17	7	Takeru Otsuka	Japan	52.75	50.58	52.80	52.80
11	21	9	Ståle Sandbech	Norway	29.05	27.43	39.66	39.66
12	8	10	Sean FitzSimons	United States	29.48	29.61	26.61	29.61

== Concerns and controversies ==
The medal results stirred controversy when Canada's Max Parrot, during his gold winning performance, grabbed his knee instead of the board. Replays showed him "failing to grab his board and instead clutching around his lower leg, meaning that the maneuver was incomplete and should have been marked down." Despite this, the run was scored as a 90.96. In a later interview with snowboarding website Whitelines, the head Olympic snowboard judge Iztok Sumatik explained that they were "being pushed to be on time" and that the judges did not get a replay of the trick. In the angle provided to the judges, the trick had looked clean.

Fans on social media had also complained that Su was "robbed" of the gold with inexplicable low-scoring by the judges even after Su had successfully completed both his first and second runs that included the first-ever completion of the 1800 trick in competition.

During the coverage of the event, TV commentators were quick to notice the error in Parrot's gold medal run. Before the score was announced, Australian Channel 7 commentators Mitch Tomlinson and Ryan Tiene noticed that Parrot had missed grabbing his board twice and likely grabbed his leg to prevent getting injured. They said "unfortunately for Max, he's going to have points deducted." However, when the score came out, they realized that the judges had missed the error and said "that's not good for snowboarding."

BBC commentator Ed Leigh pointed out that the knee grab was a "cardinal sin". In the BBC broadcast, Leigh said, "Something like that should have cost Parrot two or three points... I looked at the sector scores afterwards - he got 9.35 out of 10. If they had spotted [the error], it would have been a six or a 6.5. There were three points between bronze and gold - that would have totally upended the podium." He went on to say that "there is a glaring judging error putting Max Parrot in gold" and that giving him the gold would be "controversial." Online, people dubbed this knee-gate, and Whitelines said that it "will go down in history a la Diego Maradona’s Hand Of God as one of the worst calls we’ll see in sport."

Moreover, bronze medalist Mark McMorris felt he had the best run of the day, and should have been the gold medalist, "but knowing that I kind of had the run of the day and one of the best rounds of my life and the whole industry knows what happened". Parrot, acknowledged the error and still felt like he deserved the gold medal, "But in the end, it's a judged sport and the fact is I had the most technical run of the day on pretty much every feature". Lead judge for the event, Iztok Sumatic said, "there are so many factors. All I can say, in Max's defence, regarding this specific run, is that it was still an insane run. He killed it, especially on the rails." Ultimately the blame lied with the organiziers, who failed to provide multiple angles of the event. Parrot reviewed the runs by the three medalists and, "he spotted three "little mistakes" during McMorris' turn, and also noted a few errors by Su", while Parrot, "didn't have any mistakes on five of the six features, and on the one jump, I had a bigger mistake".
