= FIS Freestyle Ski and Snowboarding World Championships 2023 – Men's snowboard big air =

Men's snowboard big air at the FIS Freestyle Ski and Snowboarding World Championships 2023
- Location: Bakuriani, Georgia
- Dates: 2 March (qualification); 4 March
- Competitors: 43 from 20 nations
- Winning points: 177.25

Medalists
gold medal	Taiga Hasegawa	Japan
silver medal	Mons Røisland	Norway
bronze medal	Nicolas Huber	Switzerland

The Men's snowboard big air competition at the FIS Freestyle Ski and Snowboarding World Championships 2023 was held on 2 and 4 March 2023.

== Qualification ==
The qualification was started on 2 March at 09:20. The five best snowboarders from each heat qualified for the final.

=== Heat 1 ===
Rank	Bib	Start order	Name	Country	Run 1	Run 2	Run 3	Total	Notes
1	10	1	Taiga Hasegawa	Japan	78.75	77.50	6.50	156.25	Q
2	4	10	Takeru Otsuka	Japan	69.00	80.25	63.75	149.25	Q
3	26	16	Samuel Jaroš	Slovakia	54.75	51.50	91.00	145.75	Q
4	13	5	Nicolas Huber	Switzerland	64.50	43.75	77.50	142.00	Q
5	9	3	Mons Røisland	Norway	15.25	80.50	59.25	139.75	Q
6	1	8	Marcus Kleveland	Norway	18.50	79.00	60.00	139.00	
7	29	12	Kalle Jarvilehto	Finland	81.50	56.25	24.00	137.75	
8	45	19	Clemens Millauer	Austria	70.25	23.75	66.75	137.00	
9	21	6	Noah Vicktor	Germany	16.50	56.00	52.00	108.00	
10	14	9	William Mathisen	Sweden	57.50	38.25	55.75	95.75	
11	37	20	Mikko Rehnberg	Finland	64.25	24.50	12.25	88.75	
12	38	18	Álvaro Yáñez	Chile	8.75	50.00	36.75	86.75	
13	34	11	Moritz Breu	Germany	56.50	28.25	13.75	84.75	
14	30	23	Jakub Hroneš	Czech Republic	5.50	69.50	10.00	79.50	
15	41	13	Jules De Sloover	Belgium	62.25	15.50	13.25	77.75	
16	33	17	Jesse Parkinson	Australia	10.25	60.00	11.75	71.75	
17	42	14	Romain Allemand	France	57.25	12.00	13.50	70.75	
18	18	2	Nicola Liviero	Italy	29.00	23.25	39.50	68.50	
19	46	15	Joewen Frijns	Netherlands	37.75	4.50	5.25	43.00	
20	17	4	Lyon Farrell	New Zealand	12.00	16.75	12.50	29.25	
21	22	21	Seppe Smits	Belgium	9.75	13.00	11.00	24.00	
	25	22	Emil Zulian	Italy	Did not start				
	5	7	Chris Corning	United States	Did not start				

=== Heat 2 ===
Rank	Bib	Start order	Name	Country	Run 1	Run 2	Run 3	Total	Notes
1	7	3	Ryoma Kimata	Japan	77.25	77.50	32.25	154.75	Q
2	23	16	Sam Vermaat	Netherlands	75.75	62.00	10.25	137.75	Q
3	3	10	Nicolas Laframboise	Canada	65.25	61.75	71.25	133.00	Q
4	48	12	Yang Wenlong	China	53.25	69.00	59.50	128.50	Q
5	39	23	Kristián Salač	Czech Republic	59.25	67.00	24.00	126.25	Q
6	27	11	Bendik Gjerdalen	Norway	7.00	64.00	57.50	121.50	
7	28	15	Gabriel Almqvist	Sweden	59.50	6.25	52.50	112.00	
8	15	6	Cameron Spalding	Canada	31.75	55.00	55.00	110.00	
9	20	5	Øyvind Kirkhus	Norway	54.00	14.75	53.00	107.00	
10	43	18	Naj Mekinc	Slovenia	63.00	40.25	8.50	103.25	
11	40	20	William Almqvist	Sweden	49.50	10.00	51.25	100.75	
12	24	19	Ruki Tobita	Japan	17.75	14.25	77.50	95.25	
13	19	2	Liam Brearley	Canada	9.00	41.75	41.00	82.75	
14	6	8	Sven Thorgren	Sweden	21.00	72.50	7.00	79.50	
15	36	14	Casper Wolf	Netherlands	11.50	31.00	39.50	70.50	
16	16	7	Nick Pünter	Switzerland	59.75	9.50	6.00	69.25	
17	44	17	Lee Dong-heon	South Korea	14.25	52.75	15.75	68.50	
18	31	13	Niek van der Velden	Netherlands	51.75	16.50	14.00	68.25	
19	47	24	Pedro Pizarro	Chile	16.50	1.00	23.75	40.25	
20	35	21	Stian Kleivdal	Norway	8.75	26.75	10.75	37.50	
21	12	4	Enzo Valax	France	4.75	18.25	5.00	23.25	
22	11	9	Moritz Boll	Switzerland	6.25	2.50	DNS	6.25	
	32	22	Alberto Maffei	Italy	Did not start				
	2	1	Valentino Guseli	Switzerland	Did not start				

== Final ==
The final was started on 4 March at 12:30.

Rank	Bib	Start order	Name	Country	Run 1	Run 2	Run 3	Total
1st place, gold medalist(s)	10	10	Taiga Hasegawa	Japan	90.00	87.25	9.75	177.25
2nd place, silver medalist(s)	9	2	Mons Røisland	Norway	89.00	18.00	68.25	157.25
3rd place, bronze medalist(s)	13	4	Nicolas Huber	Switzerland	60.75	23.50	89.75	150.50
4	3	5	Nicolas Laframboise	Canada	56.00	74.25	67.75	142.00
5	39	1	Kristián Salač	Czech Republic	55.00	61.50	19.50	116.50
6	7	9	Ryoma Kimata	Japan	24.25	22.00	92.00	116.25
7	48	3	Yang Wenlong	China	59.25	9.75	56.00	115.25
8	23	7	Sam Vermaat	Netherlands	71.25	28.00	16.75	99.25
9	4	8	Takeru Otsuka	Japan	14.00	76.50	22.50	99.00
10	26	6	Samuel Jaroš	Slovakia	20.75	12.50	57.00	77.75
