= FIS Snowboarding World Championships 2011 – Men's Slopestyle =

The men's slopestyle competition of the 2011 FIS Snowboarding World Championships was held in La Molina, Spain on January 22, 2011. 56 athletes from 20 countries competed.

== Results ==
=== Qualification ===
The following are the results of the qualification.

Rank	Bib	Name	Country	Run 1	Run 2	Best Score	Note
1	35	Stef Zeestraten	New Zealand	13.0	27.5	27.5	Q
2	23	Niklas Mattsson	Sweden	10.9	27.1	27.1	Q
3	29	Robby Balharry	Canada	25.5	26.4	26.4	Q
4	6	Seppe Smits	Belgium	25.8	21.4	25.8	Q
5	56	Markku Koski	Finland	23.5	9.0	23.5	Q
6	38	Petja Piiroinen	Finland	15.8	23.0	23.0	Q
7	40	Zebastian Landmark	Sweden	22.9	13.7	22.9	Q
8	33	Julien Beaulieu	Canada	15.3	22.2	22.2	Q
9	5	Ville Paumola	Finland	22.0	15.5	22.0	Q
10	51	Tor Lundstrom	Sweden	7.2	21.7	21.7	Q
11	31	Jan Necas	Czech Republic	12.8	21.3	21.3	Q
12	25	Elliot Catton	Canada	21.2	13.7	21.2	Q
13	34	Michael Macho	Austria	21.2	8.7	21.2	Q
14	11	Adrian Krainer	Austria	9.4	21.1	21.1	Q
15	1	Clemens Schattschneider	Austria	15.0	20.9	20.9	Q
16	22	Carlos Manich	Spain	20.7	12.3	20.7	Q
17	13	Mario Käppeli	Switzerland	19.8	5.1	19.8	Q
18	20	Isaac Verges	Spain	17.0	18.5	18.5	Q
19	55	Zach Stone	Canada	9.5	20.5	20.5	9th in Heat 2
20	36	Dimi De Jong	Netherlands	18.0	19.5	19.5	10th in Heat 2
21	44	Viktor Szigeti	Hungary	19.0	12.3	19.0	11th in Heat 2
22	47	James Hamilton	New Zealand	5.0	18.8	18.8	12th in Heat 2
23	54	Robbie Walker	Australia	16.0	17.7	17.7	
24	21	Carlos Torner	Spain	3.7	17.4	17.4	
25	39	Rocco van Straten	Netherlands	16.4	9.5	16.4	
26	14	Benjamin Farrow	United States	15.7	4.6	15.7	
27	17	Steve Krijbolder	Netherlands	11.8	15.3	15.3	
28	42	Bjorn Simons	Belgium	15.0	4.5	15.0	
29	37	Thomas Franc	Switzerland	13.4	13.9	13.9	
30	18	Geza Kinda	Romania	13.1	11.3	13.1	
31	9	Paul Brichta	United States	13.0	10.5	13.0	
32	45	Dolf Van Der Wal	Netherlands	6.1	12.8	12.8	
33	32	Nick Hyne	New Zealand	11.7	5.4	11.7	
34	27	Mario Visnap	Estonia	10.0	12.1	12.1	
35	50	Aleksi Partanen	Finland	10.7	11.7	11.7	
36	4	Alexey Sobolev	Russia	10.8	9.1	10.8	
37	26	Petr Horak	Czech Republic	10.5	5.3	10.5	
38	49	Miguel Moreno	Spain	8.6	9.4	9.4	
39	53	Sven Thorgren	Sweden	7.8	DNS	7.8	
40	12	Marcos Vinicius Batista	Brazil	7.2	4.1	7.2	
41	43	David Liptay	Hungary	7.1	2.5	7.1	
42	24	Siim Aunison	Estonia	3.8	7.0	7.0	
43	2	Max Buri	Switzerland	2.4	6.9	6.9	
44	28	Liam Ryan	New Zealand	3.2	6.2	6.2	
45	15	Patrick Burgener	Switzerland	2.0	DNS	2.0	
	3	Gian-Luca Cavigelli	Switzerland				DNS
	7	Lorenzo Buzzoni	Italy				DNS
	8	Giorgio Ciancaleoni	Italy				DNS
	10	Matevz Petek	Slovenia				DNS
	16	Matej Novak	Czech Republic				DNS
	19	Adam Balogh	Hungary				DNS
	30	Kevin Bronckaers	Belgium				DNS
	41	Dmitry Mindrul	Russia				DNS
	46	Matevz Pristavec	Slovenia				DNS
	48	Marco Donzelli	Italy				DNS
	52	Mathieu Crepel	France				DNS

=== Final ===
Rank	Bib	Name	Country	Run 1	Run 2	Best Score	Notes
1st place, gold medalist(s)	6	Seppe Smits	Belgium	26.7	28.7	28.7	
2nd place, silver medalist(s)	23	Niklas Mattsson	Sweden	28.1	12.5	28.1	
3rd place, bronze medalist(s)	5	Ville Paumola	Finland	17.4	26.2	26.2	
4	40	Zebastian Landmark	Sweden	10.8	25.9	25.9	
5	1	Clemens Schattschneider	Austria	25.5	16.6	25.5	
6	33	Julien Beaulieu	Canada	17.1	24.5	24.5	
7	29	Robby Balharry	Canada	23.3	24.1	24.1	
8	56	Markku Koski	Finland	23.8	16.6	23.8	
9	34	Michael Macho	Austria	22.4	9.1	22.4	
10	38	Petja Piiroinen	Finland	9.0	22.0	22.0	
11	31	Jan Necas	Czech Republic	18.8	20.3	20.3	
12	20	Isaac Verges	Spain	10.5	19.7	19.7	
13	35	Stef Zeestraten	New Zealand	18.4	11.7	18.4	
14	51	Tor Lundstrom	Sweden	16.8	10.4	16.8	
15	13	Mario Käppeli	Switzerland	7.1	16.5	16.5	
16	25	Elliot Catton	Canada	5.8	16.2	16.2	
17	11	Adrian Krainer	Austria	5.7	10.7	10.7	
18	22	Carlos Manich	Spain	10.0	6.8	10.0	
