= FIS Snowboarding World Championships 2011 – Men's big air =

The men's big air competition of the 2011 FIS Snowboarding World Championships was held in Barcelona, Spain on January 15, 2011. 52 athletes from 17 countries competed.

== Results ==
=== Qualification ===
The following are the results of the qualification.

Rank	Bib	Name	Country	Jump 1	Jump 2	Best Score	Note
1	39	Mathieu Crepel	France	14.6	29.0	29.0	Q
2	49	Aleksi Partanen	Finland	28.00	9.2	28.0	Q
3	6	Clemens Schattschneider	Austria	27.8	11.9	27.8	Q
4	33	Seppe Smits	Belgium	26.7	27.7	27.7	Q
5	2	Marco Grilc	Slovenia	25.5	27.3	27.3	Q
6	1	Gian-Luca Cavigelli	Switzerland	26.9	13.7	26.9	Q
7	50	Zachary Stone	Canada	26.9	9.9	26.9	Q
8	10	Rocco van Straten	Netherlands	26.8	26.5	26.8	Q
9	5	Petja Piiroinen	Finland	14.4	26.7	26.7	Q
10	7	Ville Paumola	Finland	26.1	12.4	26.1	Q
11	32	Roope Tonteri	Finland	11.7	26.1	26.1	Q
12	29	Markku Koski	Finland	8.9	25.6	25.6	Q
13	28	Thomas Franc	Switzerland	17.3	25.1	25.1	
14	30	Niklas Matsson	Sweden	24.9	6.5	24.9	
15	28	Harrison Gray	Canada	24.1	9.7	24.1	
16	47	Luka Jeromel	Slovenia	22.8	10.2	22.8	
17	37	Niklas Askmyr	Slovenia	22.3	8.3	22.3	
18	31	Stefan Falkeis	Austria	10.0	21.4	21.4	
19	14	Steve Krijbolder	Netherlands	5.2	21.4	21.4	
20	20	Nick Hyne	New Zealand	21.2	19.7	21.2	
21	42	Martin Cernik	Czech Republic	19.5	20.7	20.7	
22	40	Jan Necas	Czech Republic	19.8	7.4	19.8	
23	43	Carlos Manich	Spain	16.9	19.6	19.6	
24	15	Carlos Torner	Spain	19.1	10.8	19.1	
25	48	Taylor Gold	United States	19.1	7.5	19.1	
26	24	Simon Gruber	Italy	19.0	14.7	19.0	
27	21	Aluan Ricciardi	France	17.7	7.4	17.7	
28	12	Mario Kaeppeli	Switzerland	8.7	15.0	15.0	
29	23	Julien Beaulieu	Spain	13.9	6.0	13.9	
30	34	Max Buri	Switzerland	9.7	13.2	13.2	
31	11	Dimi de Jong	Netherlands	12.0	10.7	12.0	
32	51	Petr Horak	Czech Republic	12.0	4.5	12.0	
33	9	Pim Stigter	Netherlands	11.7	5.4	11.7	
34	22	Marco Donzelli	Italy	11.4	9.7	11.4	
35	16	Bjorn Simons	Belgium	7.5	11.2	11.2	
36	46	Alexandre Leblanc	Canada	11.1	9.0	11.1	
37	18	Giorgio Ciancaleoni	Italy	8.6	10.9	10.9	
38	52	Liam Ryan	New Zealand	8.5	10.4	10.4	
39	27	Michael Macho	Austria	10.1	9.0	10.1	
40	26	Paul Brichta	United States	10.0	8.4	10.0	
41	4	Matevz Petek	United States	9.9	7.0	9.9	
42	17	Josep Castellet	Spain	7.1	9.7	9.7	
43	8	Matevz Pristavec	Slovenia	7.7	7.5	7.5	
44	41	Lorenzo Buzzoni	Italy	2.6	6.1	6.1	
45	45	Isaac Verges	United States	7.0	6.8	7.0	
	3	Kevin Bronckaers	Belgium				DNS
	13	Dimitry Mindrul	Russia				DNS
	19	Geza Kinda	Romania				DNS
	25	Nicki Lund Randeris	Denmark				DNS
	35	Sergey Tarasov	Russia				DNS
	36	Alexey Sobolev	Russia				DNS
	44	Nikolay Bilanin	Russia				DNS

=== Final ===
In the final the best score of the first two rounds is paired with the score in the third run to sum up the total score. The second best score of the first two runs is then used as a tie-breaker.

Rank	Bib	Name	Country	Run 1	Run 2	Run 3	Total	Notes
1st place, gold medalist(s)	5	Petja Piiroinen	Finland	25.5	9.6	26.2	51.7	
	50	Zachary Stone	Canada	21.2	11.9	27.7	48.9	DSQ
2nd place, silver medalist(s)	33	Seppe Smits	Belgium	24.1	7.6	24.8	48.9	
3rd place, bronze medalist(s)	10	Rocco van Straten	Netherlands	18.5	20.6	26.8	47.4	
5	49	Aleksi Partanen	Finland	23.9	21.8	21.9	45.8	
6	39	Mathieu Crepel	France	28.4	14.1	13.2	41.6	
7	1	Gian-Luca Cavigelli	Switzerland	26.6	11.3	14.1	40.7	
8	2	Marco Grilc	Slovenia	26.3	9.9	13.7	40.0	
9	7	Ville Paumola	Finland	22.5	24.8	10.5	35.3	
10	32	Roope Tonteri	Finland	5.7	9.1	12.4	21.5	
11	6	Clemens Schattschneider	Austria	4.6	7.9	12.2	20.1	
12	29	Markku Koski	Finland	10.5	13.8	DNS	13.8	
