= FIS Snowboarding World Championships 2013 – Men's big air =

The men's big air competition of the 2013 FIS Snowboarding World Championships was held in Stoneham-et-Tewkesbury, Québec, Canada on January 18 & 19, 2013. 37 athletes from 14 countries competed.

== Medalists ==
Gold	Roope Tonteri; Finland (FIN)
Silver	Niklas Mattsson; Sweden (SWE)
Bronze	Seppe Smits; Belgium (BEL)

== Results ==
=== Qualification ===
Rank	Bib	Name	Country	Run 1	Run 2	Best Score	Note
1	3	Seppe Smits	Belgium	85.00	89.25	89.25	QF
2	10	Mark McMorris	Canada	86.25	88.00	88.00	QF
3	29	Tor Lundström	Sweden	85.00	85.00	85.00	QF
4	24	Alexey Sobolev	Russia	75.25	77.25	77.25	QF
5	2	Roope Tonteri	Finland	19.50	75.00	75.00	QF
6	34	Martin Mikyska	Czech Republic	70.25	72.25	72.25	QF
7	9	Sam Turnbull	Great Britain	20.50	72.00	72.00	QSF
8	25	Jan Necas	Czech Republic	51.75	68.50	68.50	QSF
9	4	Petja Piiroinen	Finland	63.75	65.75	65.75	QSF
10	14	Viktor Szigeti	Hungary	15.25	64.00	64.00	QSF
11	23	Mikhail Ilyin	Russia	63.75	24.75	63.75	QSF
12	36	Marco Donzelli	Italy	60.25	22.75	60.25	QSF
13	12	Anton Lavrentyev	Russia	55.25	4.50	55.25	QSF
14	5	Niklas Mattsson	Sweden	49.50	30.50	49.50	QSF
15	15	Mario Visnap	Estonia	11.75	48.50	48.50	QSF
16	37	Dusan Kriz	Czech Republic	19.00	38.00	38.00	QSF
17	21	Michael Roy	Canada	31.75	26.25	31.75	QSF
18	8	Matts Kulisek	Canada	19.75	44.50	44.50	
19	16	Simon Gruber	Italy	30.00	22.50	30.00	
20	17	Manuel Pietropoli	Italy	25.25	27.25	27.25	
21	1	Michael Macho	Austria	24.00	21.75	24.00	
22	18	Eric Willett	United States	20.75	DNS	20.75	
23	7	Andrew Matthews	Canada	9.75	17.00	17.00	
	6	Adrian Krainer	Austria	DNS	DNS	DNS	
	11	Mathias Weissenbacher	Slovenia	DNS	DNS	DNS	
	13	Peetu Piiroinen	Finland	DNS	DNS	DNS	
	19	Sage Kotsenburg	United States	DNS	DNS	DNS	
	20	Petr Horak	Czech Republic	DNS	DNS	DNS	
	22	Clemens Schattschneider	Austria	DNS	DNS	DNS	
	26	Janne Korpi	Finland	DNS	DNS	DNS	
	27	Billy Morgan	Great Britain	DNS	DNS	DNS	
	28	Mikhail Matveev	Russia	DNS	DNS	DNS	
	30	Ryan Stassel	United States	DNS	DNS	DNS	
	31	Carles Torner	Spain	DNS	DNS	DNS	
	32	Carlos Manich	Spain	DNS	DNS	DNS	
	33	Leandro Eigensatz	Switzerland	DNS	DNS	DNS	
	35	Sulev Paalo	Estonia	DNS	DNS	DNS	

=== Semifinal ===
Rank	Bib	Name	Country	Run 1	Run 2	Best Score	Note
1	5	Niklas Mattsson	Sweden	25.00	84.25	84.25	Q
2	25	Jan Necas	Czech Republic	69.00	30.00	69.00	Q
3	4	Petja Piiroinen	Finland	68.75	48.25	68.75	Q
4	37	Dusan Kriz	Czech Republic	15.00	64.00	64.00	Q
5	21	Michael Roy	Canada	36.00	62.25	62.25	Q
6	23	Mikhail Ilyin	Russia	59.25	29.00	59.25	Q
7	15	Mario Visnap	Estonia	28.25	29.50	29.50	
8	14	Viktor Szigeti	Hungary	22.00	15.25	22.00	
9	9	Sam Turnbull	Great Britain	18.25	21.25	21.25	
10	36	Marco Donzelli	Italy	10.00	10.00	10.00	
	12	Anton Lavrentyev	Russia	DNS	DNS	DNS	

=== Final ===
Rank	Bib	Name	Country	Run 1	Run 2	Run 3	2 Best Scores	Note
1st place, gold medalist(s)	2	Roope Tonteri	Finland	29.00	94.50	94.00	188.50	
2nd place, silver medalist(s)	5	Niklas Mattsson	Sweden	86.50	91.25	74.25	177.75	
3rd place, bronze medalist(s)	3	Seppe Smits	Belgium	93.25	29.25	56.25	149.50	
4	24	Alexey Sobolev	Russia	25.25	68.25	71.50	139.75	
5	21	Michael Roy	Canada	79.50	40.00	49.50	129.00	
6	10	Mark McMorris	Canada	90.50	36.00	36.00	126.50	
7	29	Tor Lundström	Sweden	83.50	JNS	21.00	104.50	
8	4	Petja Piiroinen	Finland	31.00	37.75	64.75	102.50	
9	7	Martin Mikyska	Czech Republic	57.00	24.00	42.25	99.25	
10	25	Jan Necas	Czech Republic	27.75	21.00	44.50	72.25	
11	37	Dusan Kriz	Czech Republic	JNS	21.75	12.00	33.75	
12	23	Mikhail Ilyin	Russia	26.50	JNS	JNS	26.50	
