= Tieghan Gerard =

American food blogger (born 1993)

- Born: Tieghan Elizabeth Gerard; September 15, 1993 (age 32)
- Occupations: Social media personality; food blogger
- Years active: 2012–present
- Relatives: Red Gerard (brother)

Instagram information
- Page: halfbakedharvest
- Genres: Food blogging, fashion
- Followers: 5.3 million (June 2026)

TikTok information
- Page: halfbakedharvest
- Followers: 880,000 (June 2026)
- Website: halfbakedharvest.com

Tieghan Elizabeth Gerard (born September 15, 1993) is an American food blogger and social media influencer. She created Half Baked Harvest in 2012, a food blog that she has since expanded into several popular social media accounts, a daily newsletter, and four cookbooks.

== Early and personal life ==
Tieghan Elizabeth Gerard was born on September 15, 1993. Gerard grew up in Cleveland, Ohio, before moving to Silverthorne, Colorado, when she was a teenager. Gerard stated in an interview on the podcast Radio Cherry Bombe that she graduated from high school early with an associate degree by taking additional classes at a local Colorado community college. She then moved to Los Angeles for approximately three months with the intention of attending fashion school but returned to Silverthorne due to homesickness.

Gerard lives near her family and has seven siblings with an age range of 35 years. One of her brothers is Olympic snowboarder Red Gerard.

== Half Baked Harvest ==
Gerard created her food blog Half Baked Harvest in 2012 on WordPress when she was nineteen years old. She originally focused on documenting the meals she would cook for her family. She has stated that she had already been cooking for her family for many years, as her father, who was in charge of cooking dinner, would often not have the food ready until late in the evening. Gerard has posted a recipe to Half Baked Harvest nearly every day since its inception.

Gerard has written four cookbooks. Her first was titled Half Baked Harvest Cookbook and was released in September 2017. Fashion and lifestyle retailer Anthropologie sold her first cookbook in their stores, a significant moment for Gerard's popularity. This was followed up by Half Baked Harvest Super Simple in October 2019, Half Baked Harvest Every Day in March 2022 and Half Baked Harvest Quick & Cozy in November 2024. All three became New York Times Best Sellers. Gerard also has a daily newsletter with 700,000 subscribers.

Gerard began selling a line of branded candles in October 2022. In September 2023, Gerard partnered with meal kit delivery service Home Chef.

In 2023, The New York Times described Gerard as an "unwilling lightning rod for controversy, entangled in issues that have galvanized the food world in the last decade: cultural appropriation, intellectual property, body shaming, privilege and racism." In 2021, Gerard faced significant backlash when she posted a recipe she called "pho", but that was largely unrelated to the soup considered Vietnam's national dish. She has been the subject of accusations of recipe plagiarism and speculation about her mental health. Gerard has four full-time and two part-time employees, one of whose duties include deleting negative comments across her social media accounts. Gerard's mother Jen runs the business side of Half Baked Harvest, with her brother Malachi and father Conrad also contributing. Gerard produces the content from a studio next to her house.

In April 2024, Gerard began a pop-up collaboration with Fig Restaurant in the Fairmont Miramar Hotel & Bungalows in Santa Monica, California.

== Bibliography ==
- Half Baked Harvest Cookbook: Recipes from My Barn in the Mountains (2017, Clarkson Potter; ISBN 9780553496390)
- Half Baked Harvest Super Simple: More Than 125 Recipes for Instant, Overnight, Meal-Prepped, and Easy Comfort Foods (2019, Clarkson Potter; ISBN 9780525577072)
- Half Baked Harvest Every Day: Recipes for Balanced, Flexible, Feel-Good Meals (2022, Clarkson Potter; ISBN 9780593232552)
- Half Baked Harvest Quick & Cozy: A Cookbook (2024, Clarkson Potter; ISBN 9780593232576)
