= Rocco van Straten =

Dutch snowboarder (born 1991)

Rocco van Straten (born 30 March 1991 in Nieuwegein) is a Dutch snowboarder. After finishing 4th in the big air competition at the World Championships 2011 he was moved up to bronze when silver medaillist Zach Stone was disqualified for doping.
