= Max Parrot =

Canadian snowboarder

Personal information
- Full name: Maxence Parrot
- Nationality: Canadian
- Born: June 6, 1994 (age 32) Cowansville, Quebec
- Height: 180 cm (5 ft 11 in)
- Weight: 70 kg (154 lb)

Sport
- Country: Canada
- Sport: Snowboarding
- Events: Slopestyle, Big air
Medal record
Men's snowboarding
Representing Canada
Event	1st	2nd	3rd
Olympic Games	1	1	1
Winter X Games	8	5	–
World Championships	-	1	–
World Cup (globes)	1	3	2
World Cup (events)	8	4	1
Total	18	14	4
Olympic Games
Gold medal – first place	2022 Beijing	Slopestyle
Silver medal – second place	2018 Pyeongchang	Slopestyle
Bronze medal – third place	2022 Beijing	Big air
World Championships
Silver medal – second place	2021 Aspen	Big air
Winter X Games
Gold medal – first place	2014 Aspen	Big Air
Gold medal – first place	2014 Aspen	Slopestyle
Gold medal – first place	2016 Aspen	Big Air
Gold medal – first place	2017 Aspen	Big Air
Gold medal – first place	2018 Aspen	Big Air
Gold medal – first place	2020 Aspen	Big Air
Silver medal – second place	2013 Aspen	Slopestyle
Silver medal – second place	2015 Aspen	Big Air
Silver medal – second place	2022 Aspen	Big Air
Winter X Games Europe
Gold medal – first place	2019 Oslo	Big air
Gold medal – first place	2020 Hafjell	Slopestyle
Silver medal – second place	2016 Oslo	Big Air
Silver medal – second place	2017 Hafjell	Big Air
Silver medal – second place	2020 Hafjell	Big air

Maxence "Max" Parrot (born June 6, 1994, in Cowansville) is a Canadian snowboarder. He is an Olympic champion in slopestyle, winning gold at the 2022 Winter Olympics and also won a silver in the event at the 2018 Winter Olympics. Parrot has also won six gold medals at the Winter X Games and two gold medals at the Winter X Games Europe.

== Early life ==
Parrot was born and raised near the Bromont ski area in Quebec. He began skiing at age three and discovered snowboarding at age 9. His father, Alain Parrot, was an alpine ski racer and Canadian waterski champion.

== Career ==
Max Parrot has made snowboarding history four times. In 2013 he laid down the first Backside Triple Cork ever seen in an X Games Slopestyle event. In 2014, Parrot was the first to land consecutive Triple jumps in a Slopestyle run at the X Games. In April 2015, Parrot performed the very first Cab Quadruple Underflip 1620. In January 2016, he brought the Cab 1800 Triple Cork into competition at the X Games in Aspen, earning him his second Big Air gold medal. He competes in slopestyle and represented Canada at the 2014 Winter Olympics in Sochi. Parrot has won a gold and silver medal each in both slopestyle and the big air events at the Winter X Games.

He competed for Canada at the 2018 Winter Olympics in South Korea, where his first competition was in the slopestyle event. Parrot qualified for the final with the highest score, but in the final, he started with difficulty. He fell heavily on his first two of three runs; on his final run, he threw down a clean run, scoring 86.00. This was good enough for the silver medal and his teammate Mark McMorris finished in third for the bronze medal. After the run, Parrot said that "I hit my head twice; a couple were pretty hard, actually. But I'm fine, I'm good. My helmet saved me twice, and it made it possible to do my third run and actually land it. It's mission accomplished for me here. I'm really happy."

In early 2019, Parrot was diagnosed with blood cancer, Hodgkin Lymphoma, and underwent 12 rounds of extensive chemotherapy for 6 months. He recovered later that year and returned to competing, winning gold at the 2020 Winter X Games and beating fellow Canadian Mark McMorris.

Parrot was named as part of Canada's 2022 Olympic team. He began his Olympics in the slopestyle event, Parrot finished the qualifying round in 10th place which meant he would start third in the final. In his second run of the final, he scored a 90.96, a run that would not be beat, locking up the gold medal for Parrot. His win was not without some controversy, as judges later admitted to missing a knee grab that according to BBC News analyst Ed Leigh, would have "totally upended the podium". For his part, Parrot called it "the best run of his life. I'm so proud of every feature, how I was able to clear them, and I'm really stoked with my score." The gold medal came after a tumultuous four years that saw him recover from a cancer diagnosis to standing on top of the podium, Parrot talked about his recovery from cancer and Olympic win saying that "you have no cardio, you have no energy, you have no muscles. To be back out here, at the Olympics, on a podium again but with a gold medal, it feels amazing." Parrot finished his Olympics with a bronze medal in the big air event.

Following the 2022 Olympics, Parrot announced he would be taking a break from competition for the 2022–2023 season but would continue training.

== Personal life ==
On January 17, 2019, Parrot announced he had been diagnosed with Hodgkin lymphoma on December 21, 2018, and that he had started a six-month course of chemotherapy. Parrot announced that he had beaten Hodgkin's lymphoma in 2019 and returned to competition that year. Parrot filmed a documentary, MAX- Life as a gold medal, about his experience with cancer as well as becoming a spokesperson for The Leukemia and Lymphoma Society of Canada. Parrot is engaged to his fiancée, Kayla, with whom he has two sons: Blake, born May 2022, and Louka, born December 2023.
