= Mons Røisland =

Norwegian snowboarder (born 1997)

Personal information
- Born: 28 January 1997 (age 29) Høvik, Norway

Sport
- Club: Bærums SK
Medal record
Men's snowboarding
Representing Norway
Olympic Games
Silver medal – second place	2022 Beijing	Big air
World Championships
Silver medal – second place	2023 Bakuriani	Big air
Winter X Games
Silver medal – second place	2020 Aspen	Slopestyle
Silver medal – second place	2021 Aspen	Slopestyle
Bronze medal – third place	2016 Aspen	Slopestyle
Bronze medal – third place	2019 Aspen	Slopestyle
Bronze medal – third place	2021 Aspen	Big air
Bronze medal – third place	2023 Aspen	Slopestyle

Mons Røisland (born 28 January 1997) is a Norwegian snowboarder who won a bronze medal in slopestyle at Winter X Games XX.

He finished 20th in the big air event at the 2017 World Championships, 12th in the slopestyle event at the 2018 Winter Olympics, and 7th in the slopestyle event at the 2019 World Championships. He competed in 2022 Winter Olympics and won the silver in the Big Air event. He placed 4th in slopestyle and 2nd in big air at the 2023 World Championships in Bakuriani, Georgia.

== Career ==
Røisland began snowboarding at eight years old on a trip around the world involving a three-month stop in Whistler, British Columbia, Canada and was immediately hooked.

One of his sponsors, Rockstar Energy Drink, lists the following career honors, awards, and highlights on their website:

- 2016 X Games Aspen 3rd Place Slopestyle
- 2015 WSF World Rookie Champion
- Pamparovo Freestyle Open Slopestyle 2nd Place
- 2015 Red Bull Nanshan Open 1st Place
- 2014 Burton European Open 3rd Place

More recent activity as per Superheroes Management includes:

- 2020 X Games Snowboard Slopestyle, Aspen, CO, 2nd Place
- 2019 X Games, Aspen, CO, 3rd Place
- 2019 World Cup, Kreischberg, AUT, 1st Place
- 2018 Dew Tour, Breckenridge, CO, 3rd Place Slopestyle
- 2018 Dew Tour, Breckenridge, CO, 1st Place Team Challenge: DC
- 2018 Winter Games NZ, Cardrona, NZ, 3rd Place
- 2018 Olympics, Pyeongchang, Finalist Snowboard Slopestyle
- 2018 Norwegian National Team Member, Pyeongchang
- 2017 Dew Tour, Breckenridge, CO, 3rd Place
- 2017 Big Air World Cup, Copper Mountain, CO, 1st Place
- 2017 MarMor, Stubai
- 2017 MarMor, Saas Fee
- 2017 Up in the Valley 5, Perisher Parks
- 2017 DC Hit & Run, Meribel, France, 1st Place
- 2017 DC Hit & Run, Meribel, France, Best Trick

He has cited his favorite Team Norway rider as being Aleksander Østreng, stating that Østreng "is the sickest rider to watch in contests, cruising park, powder or street."

When asked what his plans are after he finishes riding his snowboard for good, Røisland said he plans "to ride some more."

== Major results ==
=== Olympic Games ===
Event	Slopestyle	Big Air
2018 Pyeongchang	12th	—
2022 Beijing	7th	Silver

=== World Championships ===
Event	Slopestyle	Big Air
2017 Sierra Nevada	—	20th
2019 Park City	7th	—
2023 Bakuriani	4th	Silver

=== World Cup ===
Season	Freestyle overall		Slopestyle		Big Air	
Season	Points	Position	Points	Position	Points	Position
2015–16	400	58th	—	—	400	13th
2016–17	1268.5	32nd	1200	8th	68.6	74th
2017–18	1458.2	14th	180	35th	1278.2	5th
2018–19	1730	15th	1130	12th	600	15th
2019–20	303.3	84th	260	38th	43.3	65th
2020–21	105	10th	45	19th	60	3rd
2021–22	253	1st	173	3rd	80	5th
2022–23	10	111th	10	48th	—	—
2023–24	55	50th	26	32nd	29	28th

=== World cup podiums ===
Season	Date	Location	Discipline	Place
2016–17	14 January 2017	Kreischberg, Austria	Slopestyle	1st
2017–18	10 December 2017	Copper Mountain, United States	Big Air	1st
2018–19	8 September 2019	Cardrona, New Zealand	Big Air	3rd
2018–19	12 January 2019	Kreischberg, Austria	Slopestyle	1st
2020–21	9 January 2021	Kreischberg, Austria	Big Air	3rd
2021–22	4 December 2021	Steamboat, United States	Big Air	3rd
2021–22	1 January 2022	Calgary, Canada	Slopestyle	2nd
2021–22	27 March 2022	Silvaplana, Switzerland	Slopestyle	2nd
2024–25	2 September 2024	Cardrona, New Zealand	Slopestyle	2nd
