= Brolin Mawejje =

- Born: June 7, 1992 (age 33); Kampala, Uganda
- Citizenship: Dual citizen of Uganda and America

Brolin Mawejje (born June 7, 1992), is a Ugandan-American snowboarder. Originally from Kampala, Uganda, he moved to America as a preteen. After moving he became interested in snowboarding, and has sought to compete as the first Ugandan snowboarder, and Ugandan participant, at the winter olympics. He has also studied medicine in hopes of pursuing a medical career.

== Early life ==
Mawejje was born in Kampala, and raised primarily by his father, along with his (six or seven) other siblings. His mother had moved to the United States when he was (two or three), and his youth in Uganda proved difficult. At age 12, he moved to Lincoln, Massachusetts in order to live with his mother who had emigrated to the United States while he was a toddler. This move proved difficult for him, as he had to learn English and deal with a strained relationship with his mother who he had not seen in years. He struggled with depression and anger issues, and lived with his grandma before moving in with his adopted family the Hesslers. This family eventually left for Jackson Hole, Wyoming, and he moved along with them, finishing out his last two years of high school there.

== Snowboarding ==
Being from Uganda, which lacks a suitable climate for winter sports, Mawejje became aware of skateboarding first through movies such as Brink, and wanted to try it, but knew it was unlikely given where he was from. After moving to the United States, Mawejje received a hand-me-down skateboard on his first birthday in America, and he greatly enjoyed it. He was then exposed to snowboarding through a program that took at risk youth to Nashoba Valley. He quickly fell in love with the sport, and he found it helped him fit in and deal with his difficult life after moving to the U.S. The same family that would later adopt him also helped at this time to get him to Vermont on weekends to be able to snowboard more. After moving to Jackson and snowboarding frequently at Jackson Hole Resort, he began to compete across the Northwest as a member of the Jackson Hole Snowboarding Team.

After starting college at Westminster University in Salt Lake City, Utah, he became the subject of a documentary, Far From Home, which detailed his journey to find snowboarding. After taking the film to Uganda, Mawejje began to get questions about whether he would compete at the Olympics, and he realized there was a real possibility for him to become the first Ugandan Winter Olympian. This endeavor possessed unique challenges however. The Ugandan Olympic committee needed to register with FIS (due to the lack of previous athletes from Uganda). Additionally, he receives no financial support from Uganda. Mawejje has also gone on to found the Uganda Snowboarding Federation.

He began to train and compete in hopes of qualifying for the 2018 Winter Olympics, but had to stop 15 points short of qualifying due to doctors discovering that he had arrhythmia. Following this he began to train in hopes of qualifying for the 2022 Winter Olympics, but was stopped from participating in the qualifier due to illness. Despite these setbacks, he has indicated that he still seeks to compete in future Olympics.

== Medical career ==
Mawejje has long wished to have a career in the medical world. Starting as a freshman in high school, he wished to become a surgeon. He went on to attend Westminster College while pursuing a degree in pre-med along with a second degree, and working at a hospital in Boston, Massachusetts over the summers. Following attending Westminster College, he studied for and received a master's degree in epidemiology with a focus on sports and injury. After this, he enrolled at Parker University, where he currently studies for a Doctor of Chiropractic degree. He has expressed interest in practicing medicine in Africa once he completes his studies.

== See also ==
- Ugandan Americans
