= Judd Henkes =

American snowboarder (born 2001)

Personal information
- Full name: Justus Henkes
- Born: April 3, 2001 (age 25) San Diego, California, U.S.
- Home town: La Jolla, California, U.S.

Sport
- Country: United States
- Sport: Snowboarding
- Events: Slopestyle; Big air
- Club: Mammoth Mountain Ski and Snowboard
Medal record
Men's snowboarding
Representing the United States
World Championships
Bronze medal – third place	2019 Utah	Slopestyle

Justus "Judd" Henkes (born April 3, 2001) is an American snowboarder who competes in slopestyle and big air.

== Career ==
Henkes won a bronze medal in slopestyle at the FIS Freestyle Ski and Snowboarding World Championships 2019. He competed at the FIS Freestyle Ski and Snowboarding World Championships 2017, where he reached the semi-final in big air. He won a silver medal in slopestyle at the 2017 FIS Snowboarding Junior World Championships.
