= Ville Paumola =

Finnish snowboarder (born 1991)

Personal information
- Born: 16 March 1991 (age 35) Ylöjärvi, Finland
- Height: 5 ft 8 in (173 cm)
- Weight: 150 lb (68 kg)

Sport
- Country: Finland
- Sport: Snowboarding
Medal record
Representing Finland
FIS Snowboarding World Championships
Bronze medal – third place	2011 La Molina	Slopestyle

Ville Paumola (born 16 March 1991) is a snowboarder from Finland. He won a bronze medal at the 2011 FIS Snowboarding World Championships in the slopestyle event.

He competed at the 2014 Winter Olympics in Sochi, Russia placing 19th in the Men's Slopestyle Snowboarding semi-final.
