= Ståle Sandbech =

Norwegian snowboarder

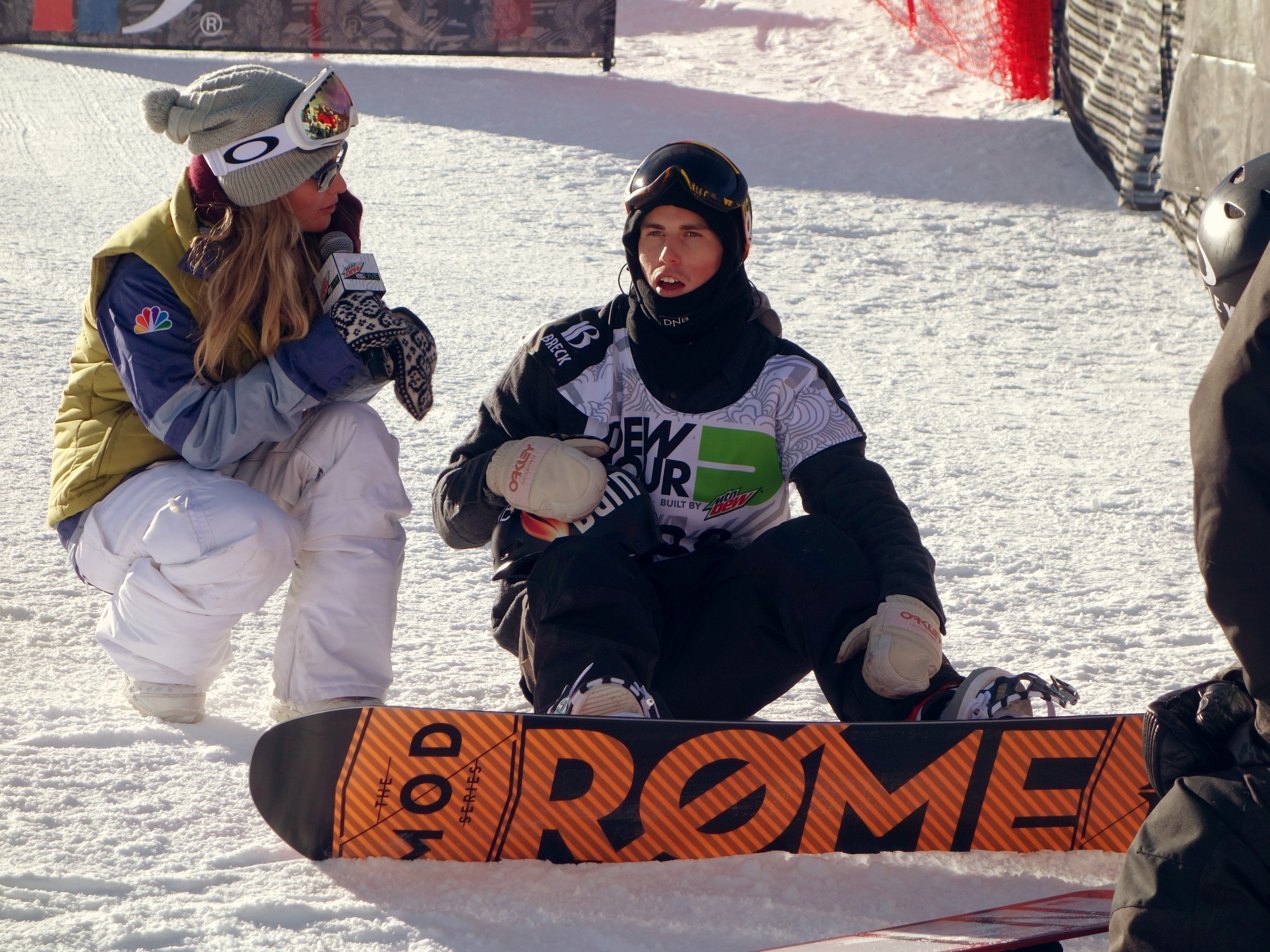
- Sandbech in 2014

Personal information
- Born: 3 June 1993 (age 33) Bærum, Norway
- Occupation: Professional Snowboarder
- Height: 178 cm (5 ft 10 in)
- Weight: 61 kg (134 lb)

Sport
- Country: Norway
- Sport: Snowboarding
- Club: BSK Snowboard
Medal record
Olympic Games
Silver medal – second place	2014 Sochi	Slopestyle
World Championships
Gold medal – first place	2017 Sierra Nevada	Big Air
Winter X Games
Silver medal – second place	2015 Aspen	SlopeStyle
Silver medal – second place	2017 Hafjell	SlopeStyle
Bronze medal – third place	2013 Aspen	Big Air
Bronze medal – third place	2014 Aspen	Big Air
Bronze medal – third place	2014 Aspen	SlopeStyle
LAAX Open
Silver medal – second place	LAAX Open 2022	SlopeStyle

Ståle Sandbech (born 3 June 1993) is a Norwegian snowboarder, who specialises in Big Air, and Slopestyle. He has participated at the 2010, 2014, 2018, and 2022 Winter Olympics and won a silver medal in the Men's slopestyle in 2014. Sandbech has also competed at several Winter X Games, winning 2 Silver medals in 2015 and 2017 and 3 bronze medals in 2013 and 2014, and a gold medal at the 2017 World Championships.

== Career ==
Sandbech comes from Rykkinn in Bærum and competes for the club BSK Snowboard. He started snowboarding at the age of eight and, in 2007, was invited to the rookie-competition of The Arctic Challenge. The organizer of TAC Terje Håkonsen said Sandbech was the best 13-year-old snowboarder in Norway at the time.

Sandbech represented Norway at the 2010 Winter Olympics in Vancouver, becoming the youngest Norwegian to go to the Olympics since Sonja Henie represented Norway at the 1928 Winter Olympics 82 years earlier. Sandbech won the World Snowboarding Tour in freestyle in 2011–12.

Sandbech won a bronze medal in Big Air at the 2013 Winter X Games, where his countryman Torstein Horgmo won gold. Four Norwegians qualified for the Big Air final in the 2014 games, with Sandbech placing the highest and winning the bronze medal. The next day, he won another bronze medal in slopestyle.

At the 2014 Winter Olympics, Sandbech participated in slopestyle, the first time it was included in an Olympic program. He tried a triple cork in his first run but failed to land it. He had a successful second run, and with 91.75 points, he placed second behind Sage Kotsenburg. It was Norway's first medal in the 2014 Olympics. Former snowboarder and Norwegian TV 2 commentator, Andreas Wiig, and the Swedish slopestyle competitor, Sven Thorgren, both stated that Sandbech should have won the gold as he performed better than Kotsenburg in their opinions.

Sandbech competed in the 2015 Winter X Games in Aspen, Colorado, where he placed 5th in Men's BigAir and earned a silver medal in Slopestyle. The following year during the 2016 Winter X Games, Sandbech placed 5th in BigAir and 7th in Slopestyle.

During the 2017 Winter X Games, he placed 5th in Big Air and just off the podium of Slopestyle in only 4th place with a score of 85.66. While Sandbech did compete during the 2019 Winter X Games, he did not make it into any finals.

During the 2018 Winter Olympics, Sandbech competed in Big Air and slopestyle, where he finished just outside the podium in 4th. At the 2022 Winter Olympics in Beijing, Sandbech qualified in 4th for the slopestyle final, where he finished 11th. In the big air event, Sandbech placed 16th in the qualifier and did not advance to the final competition.

Sandbech placed 2nd with a score of 80.43 at the 2022 LAAX Open, earning himself a silver medal.

In 2025, Sandbech won the Natural Selection Tour event in Revelstoke.
