= Red Gerard =

American snowboarder (born 2000)

- Gerard in 2026

Personal information
- Nicknames: Red, RedBoy
- Born: June 29, 2000 (age 26) Rocky River, Ohio, U.S.
- Home town: Silverthorne, Colorado
- Height: 5 ft 5 in (165 cm)
- Weight: 135 lb (61 kg)
- Relative: Tieghan Gerard (sister)

Sport
- Country: United States
- Sport: Snowboarding
- Events: Slopestyle, Big air
- Club: Burton Global Team
Medal record
Men's snowboarding
Representing United States
Event	1st	2nd	3rd
Olympic Games	1	-	-
Winter X Games	2	-	1
World Cup (globes)	1	2	-
World Cup (events)	4	6	3
Total	8	8	4
Olympic Games
Gold medal – first place	2018 Pyeongchang	Slopestyle
X Games
Bronze medal – third place	2020 Aspen	Slopestyle
Gold medal – first place	2024 Aspen	Slopestyle
Gold medal – first place	2025 Aspen	Slopestyle
Dew Tour
Gold medal – first place	2020 Copper	Slopestyle
Gold medal – first place	2021 Copper	Slopestyle

Redmond Gerard (born June 29, 2000) is an American snowboarder.

== Career ==
Gerard placed first overall for slopestyle in the 2016–17 FIS Snowboard World Cup, with a third place finish at the Kreischberg World Cup, and first place at the Mammoth World Cup. The following season, Gerard came second in big air event at the Milan World Cup, and won first place in slopestyle at the Snowmass World Cup. He has a further two slopestyle World Cup event wins at the 2019 and 2022 Mammoth World Cup.

In 2019, Gerard won Burton US Open in slopestyle, and placed second in the big air World Cup event at Cardrona.

In 2020, Gerard placed second at the Laax Open and first in the Dew Tour, both in slopestyle. He defended his Dew Tour title the following year.

In 2022, Gerard came second in the Aspen World Cup for slopestyle.

Gerard achieved two third place World Cup event finishes at the Edmonton and Copper Big Air events.

In 2025, Gerard achieved two slopestyle second place finishes at the Laax Open and Calgary World Cup.

Gerard has won three X Games medals for slopestyle: a bronze he won in 2020, and two golds which he won back-to-back in 2024 and 2025.

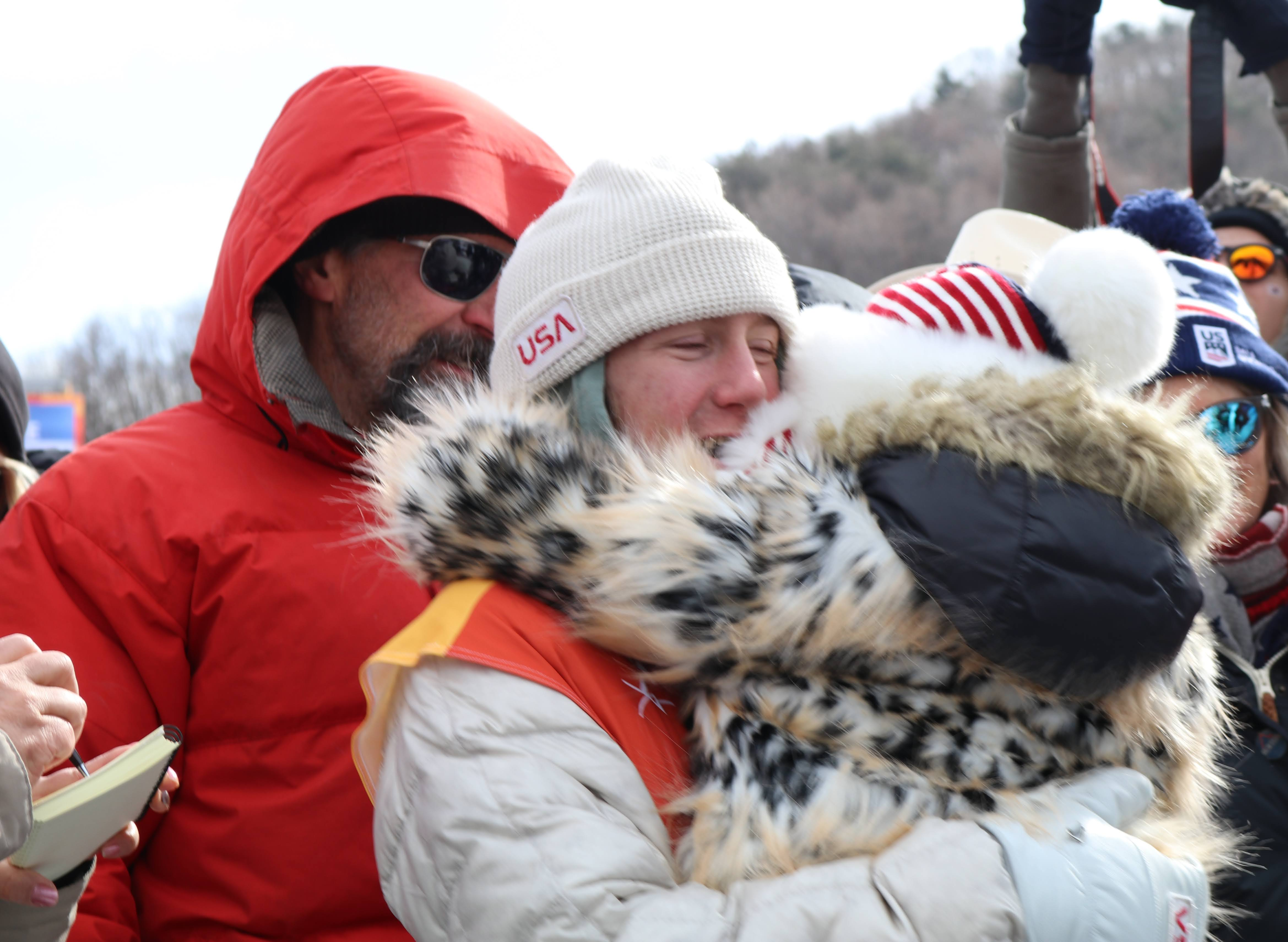
Red Gerard (center) celebrates his 2018 Winter Olympics gold medal in Pyeongchang, South Korea

=== 2018 Winter Olympics ===
Gerard made his Olympic debut at the 2018 Winter Olympics, where he competed in the slopestyle and big air events for the United States. In slopestyle, Gerard won the gold medal. This performance itself was rather famous for the events surrounding Gerard; he had overslept in his hotel room after partying late and binge-watching Brooklyn Nine-Nine, lost his jacket, was forced to borrow his roommate's jacket, and accidentally used profanity on live TV after his win. He became the first Winter Olympics medalist born in the 2000s. Gerard was also the first American gold medalist in the 2018 Winter Olympics and the youngest American to medal in a snowboarding event at the Olympics. Before the Olympics, Sports Illustrated picked Gerard as their prediction for the men's snowboarding slopestyle gold medal.

=== 2022 Winter Olympics ===
Gerard competed for Team USA at the 2022 Winter Olympics, where he made the slopestyle final, but narrowly missed out on a medal, placing fourth. He also competed in the big air event, where he came fifth.

== Personal life ==
Gerard was born and raised in Ohio, but lives in Silverthorne, Colorado, where he has his own miniature snowboarding park in his backyard with a rope tow.

Gerard is a spokesperson for the Toyota Motor Corporation.

Gerard's sister is food blogger Tieghan Gerard of Half Baked Harvest.
