= Zach Stone =

Canadian snowboarder (born 1991)

Personal information
- Born: 6 September 1991 (age 34) Collingwood, Ontario, Canada
- Height: 5 ft 11 in (180 cm)

Sport
- Country: Canada
- Sport: Snowboarding
- Event: Big air

Zachary "Zach" McKenzie Stone (born 6 September 1991 in Collingwood, Ontario) is a Canadian professional snowboarder and World Championship medalist. Stone won a silver medal at the 2011 FIS World Championships, but was later disqualified for doping.

== Snowboard World Cup results ==
=== World Championships ===
Test / Edition	Barcelona 2011
Big Air	N/A
