= Michael Schärer =

Swiss snowboarder (born 1996)

Personal information
- Nationality: Swiss
- Born: 23 December 1996 (age 29)
- Height: 1.85 m (6 ft 1 in)

Sport
- Sport: Snowboarding

Michael Schärer (born 23 December 1996) is a Swiss snowboarder. He competed in the 2018 Winter Olympics.
