= Moritz Thönen =

Swiss snowboarder (born 1996)

Personal information
- Nationality: Swiss
- Born: 9 December 1996 (age 29)
- Height: 1.82 m (6 ft 0 in)

Sport
- Sport: Snowboarding

Moritz Thönen (born 9 December 1996) is a Swiss snowboarder. He competed in the 2018 Winter Olympics.
