= Yuri Okubo =

Japanese snowboarder (born 2000)

Personal information
- Nationality: Japanese
- Born: 27 July 2000 (age 25)
- Height: 1.72 m (5 ft 8 in)

Sport
- Sport: Snowboarding

Yuri Okubo (大久保 勇利, Ōkubo Yūri; born 27 July 2000) is a Japanese snowboarder. He competed in the 2018 Winter Olympics.
