= Tyler Nicholson =

Canadian snowboarder (born 1995)

Personal information
- Born: August 3, 1995 (age 30) North Bay, Ontario, Canada
- Height: 175 cm (5 ft 9 in)
- Weight: 74 kg (163 lb)

Sport
- Country: Canada
- Sport: Snowboarding

Achievements and titles
- Olympic finals: 2018 Winter Olympics
Medal record
Representing Canada
Winter X Games
Silver medal – second place	2017 Aspen	Slopestyle

Tyler Nicholson (born August 3, 1995) is a Canadian snowboarder, competing in the disciplines of big air and slopestyle.

== Career ==
=== X Games ===
Nicholson took the silver medal in slopestyle at Winter X Games XXI.

=== 2018 Winter Olympics ===
In January 2018, Nicholson was named to Canada's 2018 Olympic team.

== Personal life ==
Nicholson is engaged to American snowboarder Jamie Anderson.
