= Takeru Otsuka =

Japanese snowboarder (born 2001)

Personal information
- Nationality: Japanese
- Born: 2 April 2001 (age 25) Atsugi, Japan

Sport
- Sport: Snowboarding
Medal record
Winter X Games
| Gold medal – first place | 2018 Norway | Big Air |
| Gold medal – first place | 2019 Aspen | Big Air |
| Silver medal – second place | 2023 Aspen | Big Air |

Takeru Otsuka (大塚 健, Ōtsuka Takeru; born 2 April 2001) is a Japanese snowboarder. He won the freestyle overall and big air at the 2018–19 FIS Snowboard World Cup and the gold medal in the big air event at the Norway 2018 and 2019 editions of the Winter X Games.
