= Måns Hedberg =

Swedish snowboarder (born 1993)

Personal information
- Nationality: Swedish
- Born: 14 December 1993 (age 32)
- Height: 1.82 m (6 ft 0 in)

Sport
- Sport: Snowboarding

Måns Hedberg (born 14 December 1993) is a Swedish snowboarder who competed in the 2018 Winter Olympics.

In March, 2017, Hedberg broke his neck while competing in Italy. During his first run of the 2018 Winter Olympics snowboard slopestyle qualifications he suffered a hard crash and was carried from the slope in a neck brace. However, Hedberg was not injured.
