= Clemens Schattschneider =

Austrian snowboarder (born 1992)

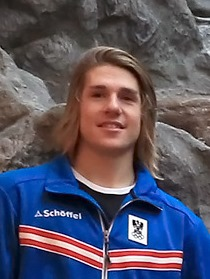
Clemens Schattschneider in 2014

Clemens Schattschneider (born 7 February 1992) is an Austrian snowboarder. He was a participant at the 2014 Winter Olympics in Sochi, Russia.
