= Seppe Smits =

Belgian professional snowboarder

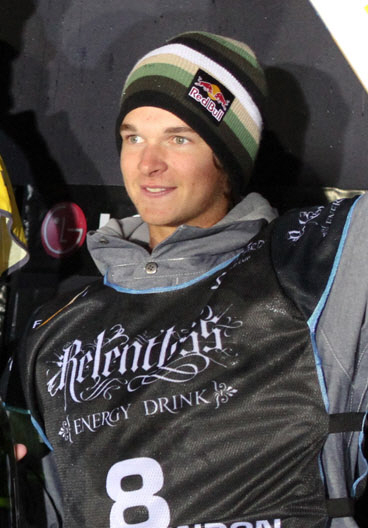

Personal information
- Full name: Sebastien Smits
- Born: 13 July 1991 (age 34) Wilrijk, Belgium
- Height: 5 ft 11 in (180 cm)
- Weight: 159 lb (72 kg)

Sport
- Country: Belgium
- Sport: Snowboarding
- Event(s): Slopestyle, Big air
Medal record
Men's snowboarding
Representing Belgium
World Championships
Gold medal – first place	2011 La Molina	Slopestyle
Gold medal – first place	2017 Sierra Nevada	Slopestyle
Silver medal – second place	2009 Gangwon	Big air
Silver medal – second place	2011 La Molina	Big air
Bronze medal – third place	2013 Stoneham	Big air
Winter X Games
Bronze medal – third place	2013 Aspen	SlopeStyle

Sebastien "Seppe" Smits (born 13 July 1991) is a Belgian professional snowboarder and world championship medalist.

Smits was born in Westmalle and started snowboarding at a serious level in the winter of 2006–2007, competing in the Europa Cup. He obtained his first World Cup medal when finishing third in the Big Air competition in Stockholm on 22 November 2008, winning the silver medal at the world championships a few months later in Gangwon. Further medals in the World Cup, both in Big Air and Slopestyle, followed over the next years.

In 2009, Seppe Smits won the rookie Big Air competition at the Air & Style festival in Innsbruck.

Smits finished second in the 6-star TTR event in Beijing on 4 December 2010.

On 8 January 2011, Smits took over the lead in the Swatch TTR World Tour for 2011, after finishing fourth in Davos. One week later, at the 2011 world championships in Barcelona, Smits won a gold medal in the slopestyle competition and finished third in the Big Air after losing the tie-breaker for silver from Zach Stone. Smits ended third in the final results of the 2010–2011 Swatch TTR World Tour, after three-times winner Peetu Piiroinen and Yuri Podladchikov.

He won the 2011–2012 TTR World Tour Big Air title and finished third at the 2012 World Championships in Oslo in the slopestyle event.

He rides goofy.

Olympic Games
Preceded by Hanna Mariën	Flagbearer for Belgium; Pyeongchang 2018	Succeeded by Incumbent
