= Alberto Maffei =

Italian snowboarder (born 1995)

Personal information
- Born: 11 May 1995 (age 29); Tione di Trento, Italy

Sport
- Country: Italy
- Sport: Snowboarding

Alberto Maffei (born 11 May 1995) is an Italian snowboarder.

He competed in the 2017 FIS Snowboard World Championships, and in the 2018 Winter Olympics, in big air.
