= Carlos Garcia Knight =

New Zealand snowboarder (born 1997)

Carlos Garcia-Knight
Personal information
- Nationality: New Zealand
- Born: 6 May 1997 (age 29)
- Height: 1.75 m (5 ft 9 in)

Sport
- Sport: Snowboarding
- Events: Slopestyle; Big air

Carlos Garcia-Knight (born 6 May 1997) is a New Zealand snowboarder and filmmaker. He competed in the 2018 Winter Olympics where he made the final of the men's slopestyle. After the games, he transitioned into filmmaking and photography.

== Personal life ==
Garcia-Knight's father emigrated to New Zealand from Cádiz, Spain.
