= Sebbe De Buck =

Belgian snowboarder (born 1995)

Personal information
- Born: 14 March 1995 (age 31) Merksem, Belgium
- Height: 1.94 m (6 ft 4 in)
- Weight: 92 kg (203 lb)

Sport
- Country: Belgium
- Sport: Snowboarding

Sebbe De Buck (born 14 March 1995) is a Belgian snowboarder. He competed in the 2018 Winter Olympics.
