= Hiroaki Kunitake =

Japanese snowboarder (born 2002)

Personal information
- Nationality: Japanese
- Born: 10 February 2002 (age 24) Aichi, Japan
- Education: Kashima Gakuen High School (ja), Ibaraki, Japan
- Height: 1.63 m (5 ft 4 in)

Sport
- Sport: Snowboarding

Hiroaki Kunitake (国武 大晃, Kunitake Hiroaki; born 10 February 2002) is a Japanese snowboarder. He competed in the 2018 Winter Olympics. In 2017, his World Snowboard Tour Ranking was 30th. In 2018, his World Snowboard Tour Ranking was 19th and in Big Air 12th. He was a member of Japan's Snowboard team competing at the 2022 Winter Olympics.
