= Stef Vandeweyer =

Belgian snowboarder (born 1999)

Personal information
- Nationality: Belgian
- Born: 6 August 1999 (age 26) Meerhout
- Height: 1.68 m (5 ft 6 in)
- Weight: 61 kg (134 lb)

Sport
- Sport: Snowboarding

Stef Vandeweyer (born 6 August 1999) is a Belgian snowboarder. He competed in the 2018 Winter Olympics.
