= Matías Schmitt =

Argentine snowboarder

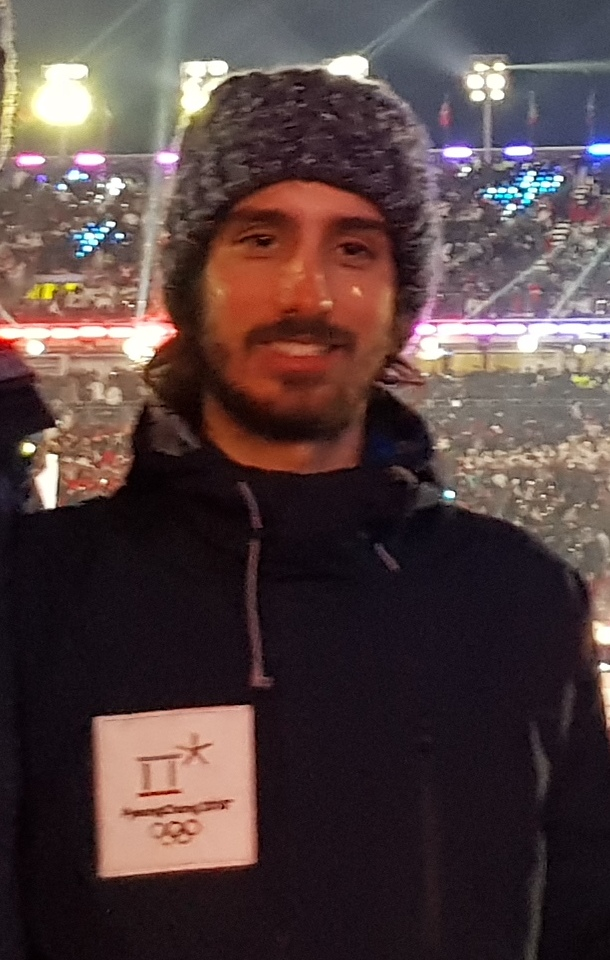
- Schmitt at the 2018 Winter Olympics opening ceremony

Personal information
- Born: 3 June 1991 (age 35) Bariloche, Argentina

Sport
- Country: Argentina
- Sport: Snowboarding
- Club: Club Andino Bariloche

Matías Schmitt (Spanish pronunciation: [maˈti.as ˈʃmit]; born 3 June 1991) is an Argentine snowboarder. He competed in the 2018 Winter Olympics.

== Sports career ==
He participated on the FIS Snowboarding World Championships 2013 hosted in Stoneham-et-Tewkesbury, Canada, where he didn't reach the finals. Then he participated on the FIS Freestyle Ski and Snowboarding World Championships 2017 hosted in the Sierra Nevada Ski Station, where he finished in the 34th place in big air and in the 32nd place in slopestyle. He also participated in the world cups of 2013–2014, 2015–2016, 2016–2017 and 2017–2018 in the same events.

In 2012 he participated in the South American cup hosted in Chile, winning the first place in slopestyle. In the 2013 cup he finished in the fourth place, while in the 2014 cup (hosted in Brazil) he finished in the eighth place. In 2015, once again in Chile, he finished in the second place in big air. The following year, he participated in the South American cup hosted in Argentina, finishing in the sixth place in slopestyle. He once again participated in 2017, but he didn't finish.

In 2015 he was the Argentine slopestyle champion. In 2016 he also competed in the European Cup in the category of slopestyle

=== Pyeongchang 2018 ===
He is competing in the 2018 Winter Olympics being celebrated in Pyeongchang, South Korea, in the snowboard categories of big air and slopestyle. This specialty did not have an Argentine representative since the 1998 Winter Olympics, when Mariano López participated.

He qualified to the Olympics after a quota place was released by a Swedish athlete and subsequently not taken up by an Italian athlete who was first on the waiting list. He was notified about his selection only two days prior to the opening ceremony. He was already in South Korea in case any possibilities for him to compete materialised.

In the first event, he finished in 12th place in the qualifying round, and 24th in the general podium, not being able to qualify for the final. It was the best individual performance of an Argentine athlete in the Winter Olympics since the 2006 Winter Olympics.
