= Chris Corning =

American snowboarder (born 1999)

Personal information
- Born: September 7, 1999 (age 26) Silverthorne, Colorado, U.S.
- Height: 5 ft 8 in (173 cm)
- Weight: 165 lb (75 kg)
- Spouse: Shannatay Bergeron (April 2023)

Sport
- Country: United States
- Sport: Snowboarding
- Event(s): Slopestyle, Big air
Medal record
Men's snowboarding
Representing the United States
World Championships
Gold medal – first place	2019 Utah	Slopestyle
Silver medal – second place	2017 Sierra Nevada	Big air
Bronze medal – third place	2017 Sierra Nevada	Slopestyle
Bronze medal – third place	2023 Bakuriani	Slopestyle

Chris Corning (born September 7, 1999) is an American snowboarder. He competed in big air and slopestyle at Winter X Games XXII.

He won a bronze medal in slopestyle at the FIS Freestyle Ski and Snowboarding World Championships 2017. He was selected to participate in the 2018 Winter Olympics, placing 4th in the big air contest and 17th in slopestyle. In 2018 he placed 2nd in the Burton US Open, behind Mark McMorris.

He won a gold medal in slopestyle at the FIS Freestyle Ski and Snowboarding World Championships 2019 in Utah.

He competed in the 2022 Winter Olympics, placing 6th in slopestyle, and 7th in big air.
