= Rowan Coultas =

British snowboarder (born 1997)

Rowan Coultas (snowboarder)
Personal information
- Full name: Rowan Arkas Coultas
- National team: United Kingdom
- Born: 21 June 1997 (age 29) Bedford, England, United Kingdom
- Height: 1.75 m (5 ft 9 in)
- Spouse: Holly Bloomfield

Sport
- Sport: Snowboarding
- Events: Slopestyle and Big Air

Rowan Coultas (born 21 June 1997) is a British snowboarder on Team GB. He represented Great Britain in the 2018 Winter Olympics in Big Air and came 17th.

What started with a Christmas present of a snowboard lesson in 2009 lead him to an impressive professional career, joining Team GB at only 13 years old and lead him to becoming an Olympian.

He made his World Cup debut in February 2015 at the Park City slopestyle event, finishing 13th, and over the following seasons achieved several top-10 finishes at World Cup events as well as podium results at competitions like the Red Bull Nanshan Open and Sony Xperia Big Air

After a silver Junior World Championship medal to his name from 2010 and numerous World Cup top-ten finishes, Coultas was selected to make his Olympic debut at PyeongChang 2018.

He competed in both the men's slopestyle and big air in South Korea, finishing 18th in his heat in the former and eighth in his heat in the latter. The big air performance saw him miss out on qualification for the final by just half a point.

Rowan has since pursed his coaching career, starting with Snowsports England working on talent pathways, including coaching sessions like the Futures Project and Backing the Best development programs. Then working with Team GB and HBC New Zealand, he coaches high-performance snowboard coaching for athletes on the international pathway, from junior level through to World Cup competition.
