= Niek van der Velden =

Dutch snowboarder (born 2000)

Personal information
- Born: 28 May 2000 (age 25) Nispen, Netherlands
- Height: 175 cm (5 ft 9 in)

Sport
- Country: Netherlands
- Sport: Snowboarding

Niek van der Velden (born 28 May 2000) is a Dutch snowboarder.

== Biography ==
Van der Velden started snowboarding when he was eight years old. Van der Velden used to do gymnastics, but when he was 15 years old, he was scouted by the Dutch Ski Federation. For that reason, Van der Velden moved from Nispen to Papendal to train at the national training centre, part of the national junior team.

In 2016 he made his World Cup debut in South Korea. In March 2017, Van der Velden broke his left tibia in Sierra Nevada, Spain. He couldn't compete for a few months and returned to competition in September 2017.

He became 2017 Sportsman of the Year in Roosendaal.

He qualified for the 2018 Winter Olympics, being the youngest Dutch athlete of the Dutch team, for the men's slopestyle and men's big air disciplines. However, due to a crash in the last training for the slopestyle, he broke his right arm and was not able to compete.
