= Jonas Bösiger =

Swiss snowboarder (born 1995)

Jonas Boesiger
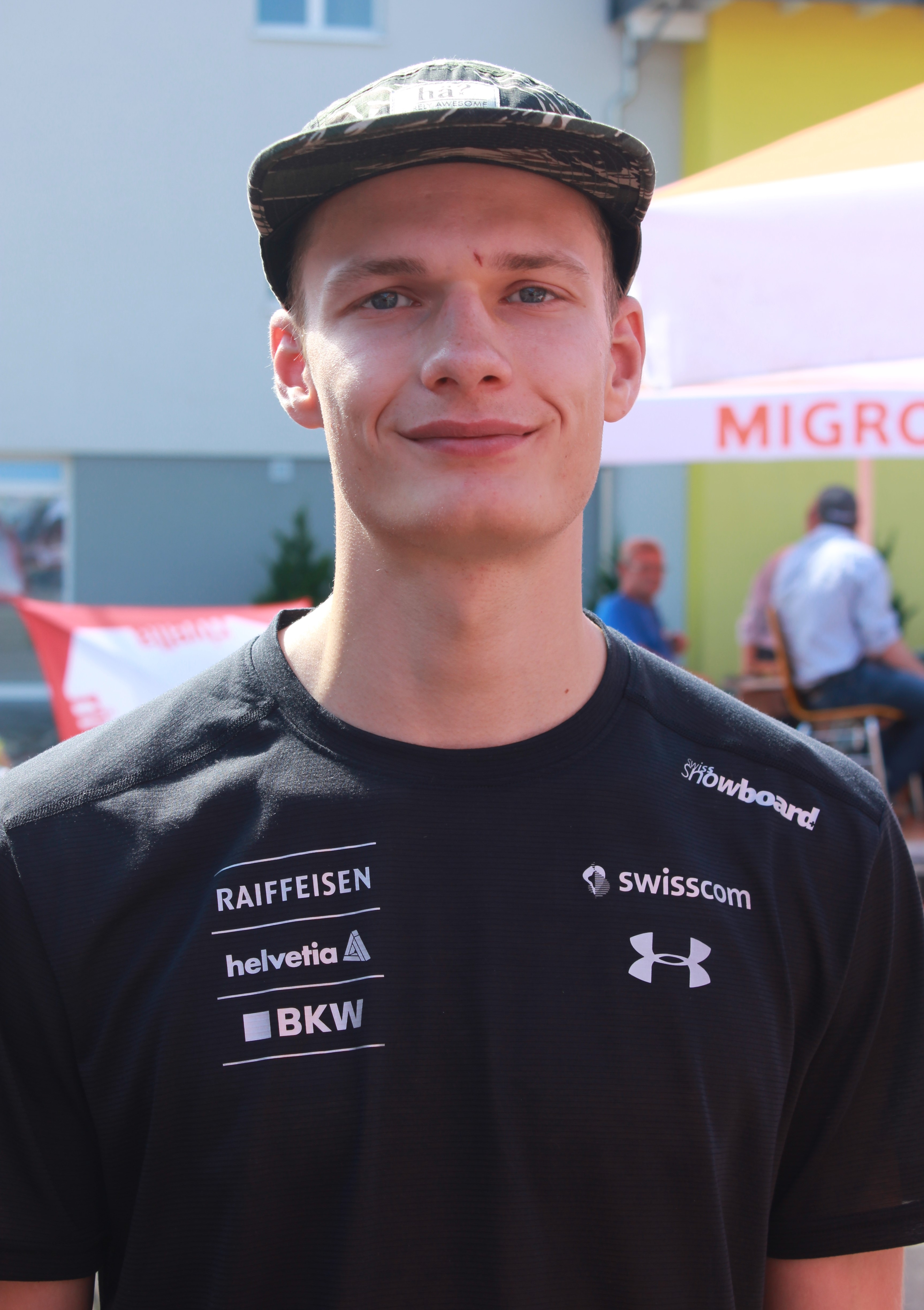
- Boesiger in 2018

Personal information
- Nationality: Swiss
- Born: 5 April 1995 (age 30)
- Height: 1.83 m (6 ft 0 in)

Sport
- Sport: Snowboarding
- Event(s): Slopestyle, Big Air
- Club: SC Schwyz

Jonas Boesiger (born 5 April 1995) is a Swiss snowboarder. He competed at both the PyeongChang 2018 and Beijing 2022 Winter Olympics.
