= Nicolas Huber =

Swiss snowboarder (born 1995)

Personal information
- Nationality: Swiss
- Born: 14 January 1995 (age 31)
- Height: 1.80 m (5 ft 11 in)

Sport
- Sport: Snowboarding
Medal record
Men's snowboarding
Representing Switzerland
World Championships
Silver medal – second place	2017 Sierra Nevada	Slopestyle
Bronze medal – third place	2023 Bakuriani	Big air

Nicolas Huber (born 14 January 1995) is a Swiss snowboarder. He competed in the 2018 Winter Olympics.
