= Sven Thorgren =

Swedish snowboarder

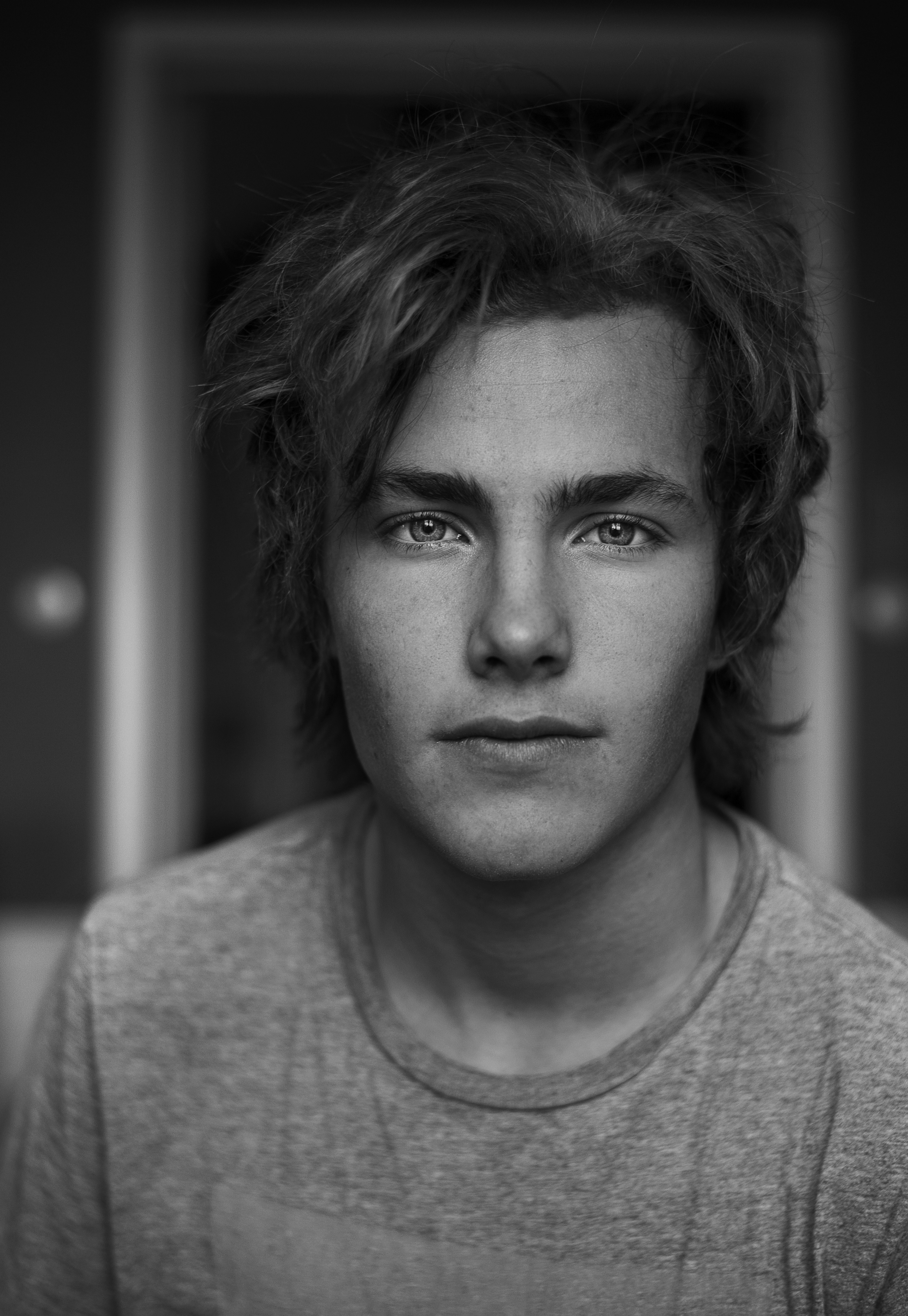
- Thorgren in 2012

Personal information
- Born: 4 October 1994 (age 31) Sollentuna, Sweden
- Height: 5 ft 8 in (173 cm)
- Weight: 154 lb (70 kg)

Sport
- Country: Sweden
- Sport: Snowboarding
Medal record
Men's snowboarding
Representing Sweden
Winter X Games
Gold medal – first place	2017 Norway	SlopeStyle
Silver medal – second place	2019 Oslo	Big air
Silver medal – second place	2021 Aspen	Big air
Bronze medal – third place	2015 Aspen	SlopeStyle
Bronze medal – third place	2019 Aspen	Big air
Bronze medal – third place	2020 Aspen	Big air
Bronze medal – third place	2020 Aspen	Slopestyle Rail Jam
Bronze medal – third place	2022 Aspen	SlopeStyle

Sven Thorgren (born 4 October 1994) is a Swedish snowboarder who competes in slopestyle.

He started snowboarding when he was seven years old. He practiced every day after school on a small mountain called Väsjöbacken. Thorgren qualified for the 2014 Winter Olympics. On 6 February 2014 in the qualification event, Thorgren finished third in his heat and qualified directly to the finals. In the finals, he finished fourth. His most recent medal was at Air&Style, China, where he got the gold medal.

At FIS Snowboarding World Championships 2011 and 2013 finished 39th and 18th, respectively. His best World Cup result and the only podium before the 2014 Olympics was the third-place finish in Spindleruv Mlyn on 16 March 2013.
