= Vlad Khadarin =

Russian snowboarder (born 1998)

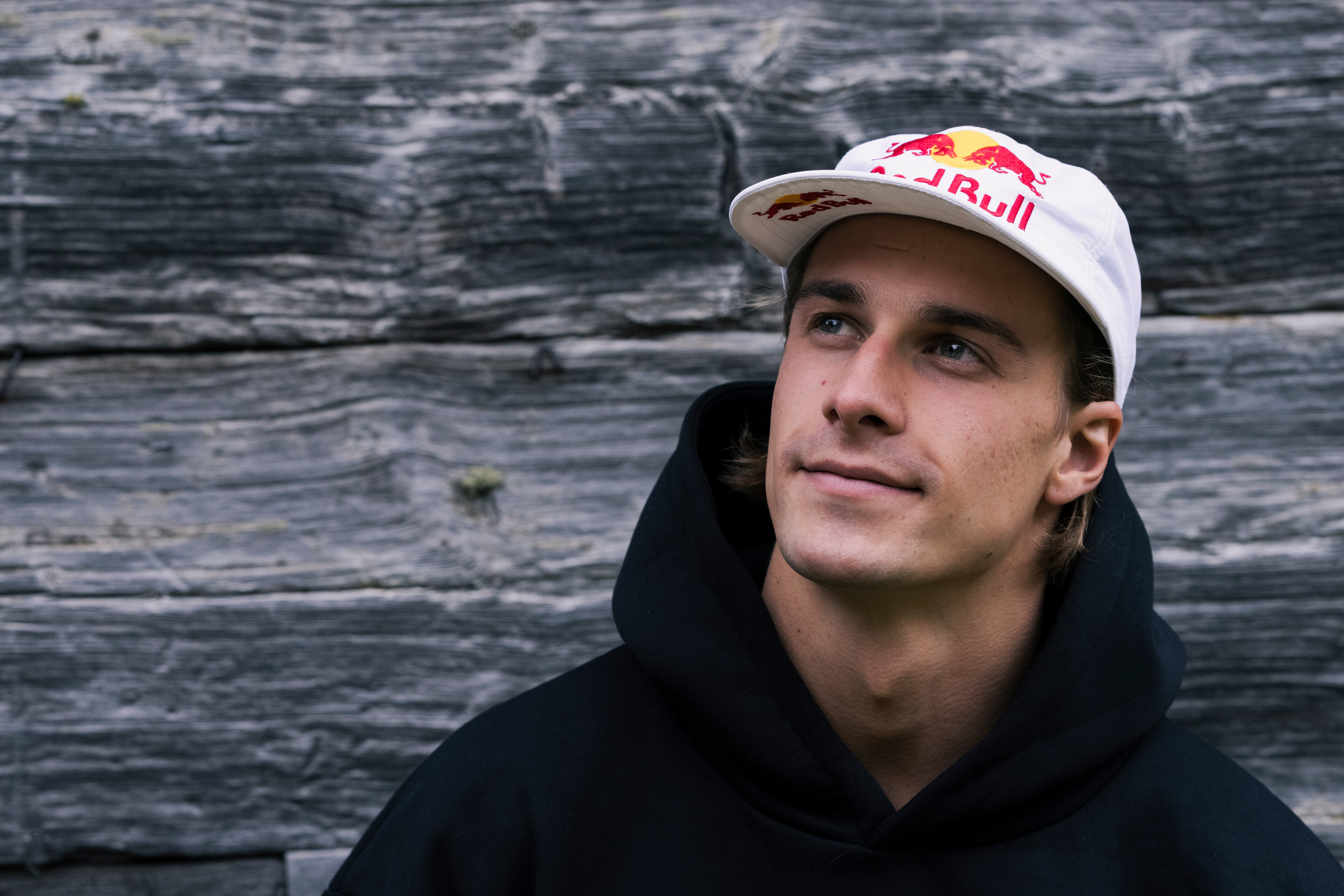
- Vlad Khadarin in Saas-Fee, 2021

Personal information
- Full name: Vladislav Khadarin
- National team: Russia
- Born: 22 February 1998 (age 28) Novosibirsk, Russia
- Height: 1.78 m (5 ft 10 in)
- Weight: 72 kg (159 lb)

Sport
- Country: Russia
- Sport: Snowboarding
- Events: Slopestyle; Big air
- Team: Freestyle Academy
- Coached by: Davide Cecconi
Medal record
Representing Russia
Winter Universiade
Silver medal – second place	2019 Krasnoyarsk	Slopestyle

Vlad Khadarin (born 22 February 1998) is a Russian-born professional snowboarder competing in slopestyle and big air events. In 2011, he moved to Italy with his family. Nowadays, he resides in Como and his home mountain is Madonna di Campiglio.

== Career ==
Vlad Khadarin started competing in season 2015/2016. He won Silver at the 2016 Youth Winter Olympics in Lillehammer, Norway. In January 2017, Vlad won Gold at his first World Cup in Moscow, Russia and later in the year he became the first person to land a frontside 1800 nose. He won Bronze at the World Cup in Secret Garden, China in 2018 and Gold at the World Cup in Seiser Alm, Italy in 2020. He competed in the 2018 Winter Olympics and 2022 Winter Olympics. He also competed at the Burton US Open in Vail, Colorado (2019), Laax Open in Switzerland (2017, 2019, 2020, 2021, 2022) and the Snowboarding World Championships (2017, 2019, 2021).
