= Niklas Mattsson =

Swedish snowboarder (born 1992)

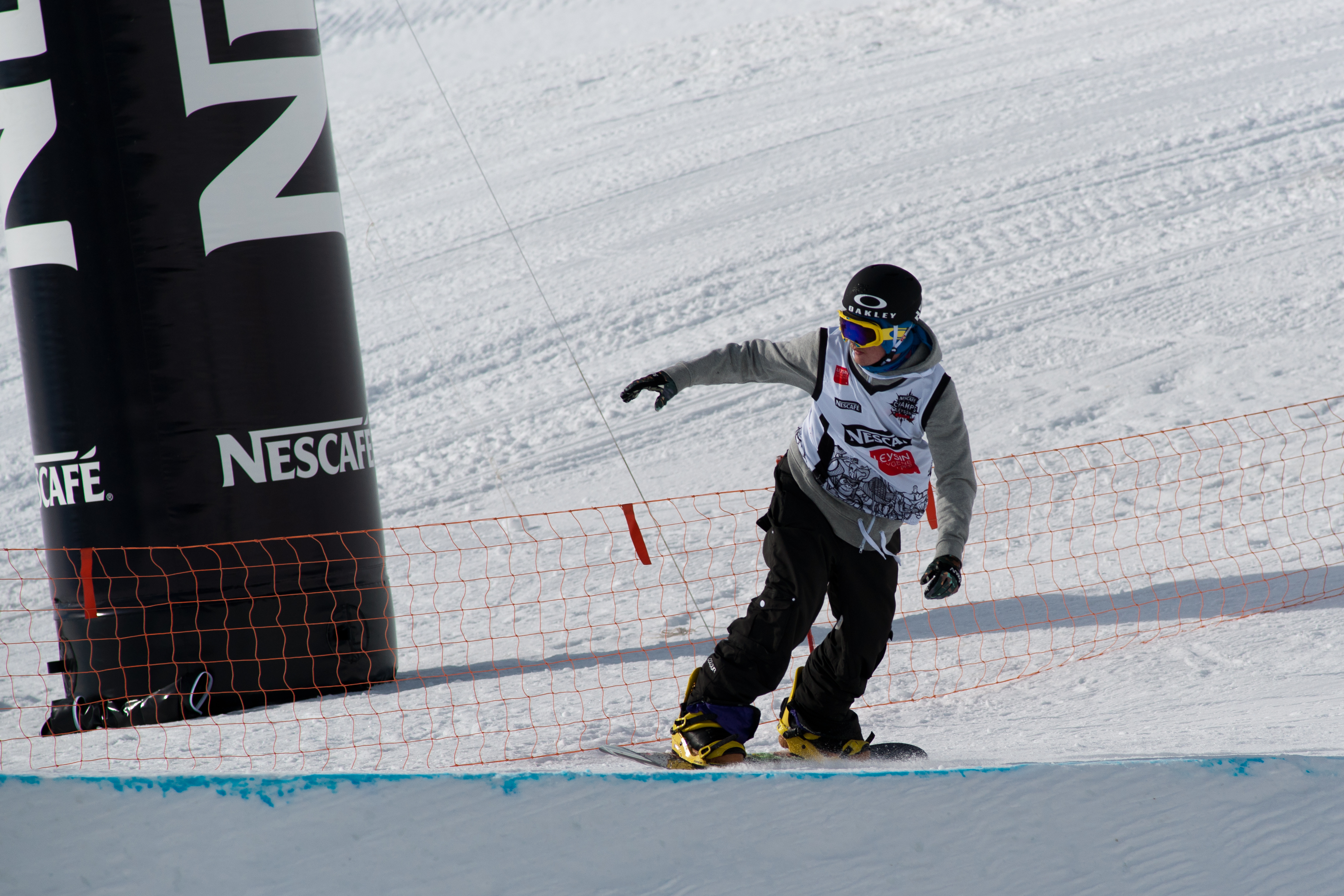
- Mattsson in 2011

Personal information
- Born: 16 March 1992 (age 34) Sundsvall, Sweden
- Height: 6 ft 2 in (188 cm)
- Weight: 170 lb (77 kg)

Sport
- Country: Sweden
- Sport: Snowboarding
Medal record
Representing Sweden
FIS Snowboarding World Championships
Silver medal – second place	2011 La Molina	Slopestyle
Silver medal – second place	2013 Stoneham	Big air

Niklas Mattsson (born 16 March 1992) is a snowboarder from Sweden. He won a silver medal at the 2011 FIS Snowboarding World Championships in the slopestyle event. Mattsson was born in Sundsvall.
