= Clemens Millauer =

Austrian snowboarder (born 1994)

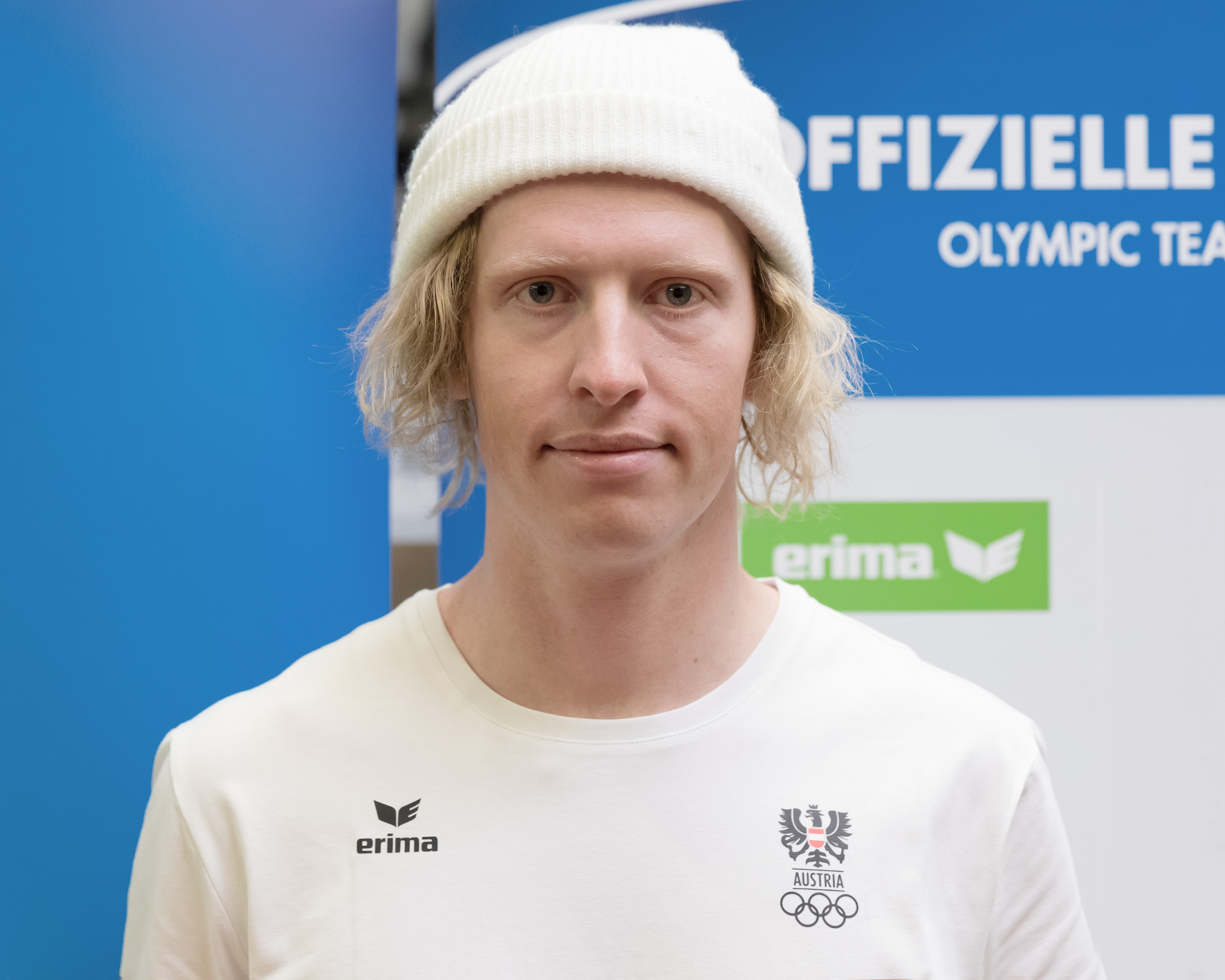
- Millauer in 2018

Personal information
- Born: 15 December 1994 (age 31) Kirchdorf an der Krems, Austria
- Height: 1.80 m (5 ft 11 in)

Sport
- Country: Austria
- Sport: Snowboarding

Clemens Millauer (born 15 December 1994) is an Austrian snowboarder. He competed in the 2018 Winter Olympics and the 2022 Winter Olympics.
