= Petr Horák =

Czech snowboarder (born 1991)

Personal information
- Nationality: Czech
- Born: 7 September 1991 (age 34) Kladno, Czechoslovakia
- Height: 1.70 m (5 ft 7 in)

Sport
- Sport: Snowboarding

Petr Horák (born 7 September 1991) is a Czech snowboarder. He competed in the 2018 Winter Olympics.
