= Kalle Järvilehto =

Finnish snowboarder (born 1995)

Personal information
- Nationality: Finnish
- Born: 21 July 1995 (age 30) Helsinki, Finland
- Height: 1.81 m (5 ft 11 in)

Sport
- Sport: Snowboarding
- Event(s): Freestyle (Big Air, Slopestyle)

Kalle Järvilehto (born 21 July 1995) is a Finnish snowboarder. He competed in the 2018 Winter Olympics.
