= FIS Freestyle Ski and Snowboarding World Championships 2015 – Men's snowboard slopestyle =

The men's snowboard slopestyle competition of the FIS Freestyle Ski and Snowboarding World Championships 2015 was held at Kreischberg, Austria on January 19 (qualifying) and January 21 (finals). 50 athletes from 20 countries competed.

== Qualification ==
The following are the results of the qualification.

| Rank | Heat | Bib | Name | Country | Run 1 | Run 2 | Best | Notes |
|---|---|---|---|---|---|---|---|---|
| 1 | 1 | 1 | Kyle Mack | United States | 79.33 | 88.66 | 88.66 | QF |
| 2 | 1 | 3 | Måns Hedberg | Sweden | 87.33 | 62.00 | 87.33 | QF |
| 3 | 1 | 10 | Philipp Kundratitz | Austria | 29.33 | 87.00 | 87.00 | QF |
| 4 | 1 | 8 | Jonas Bösiger | Switzerland | 85.66 | 14.33 | 85.66 | QF |
| 5 | 1 | 23 | Tatsuki Imamura | Japan | 26.33 | 85.33 | 85.33 | QS |
| 6 | 1 | 6 | Darcy Sharpe | Canada | 78.00 | 81.00 | 81.00 | QS |
| 7 | 1 | 7 | Michael Ciccarelli | Canada | 78.66 | 22.00 | 78.66 | QS |
| 8 | 1 | 19 | Kevin Kok | Italy | 52.66 | 73.33 | 73.33 | QS |
| 9 | 1 | 25 | Sam Turnbull | Great Britain | 40.66 | 70.33 | 70.33 | |
| 10 | 1 | 11 | Sebbe de Buck | Belgium | 55.00 | 65.33 | 65.33 | |
| 11 | 1 | 5 | Petja Piiroinen | Finland | 62.33 | 24.00 | 62.33 | |
| 12 | 1 | 2 | Haakon Eilertsen | Norway | 56.66 | 40.66 | 56.66 | |
| 13 | 1 | 9 | Stian Kleivdal | Norway | 16.33 | 50.66 | 50.66 | |
| 14 | 1 | 12 | Lucien Koch | Switzerland | 50.00 | 23.66 | 50.00 | |
| 15 | 1 | 15 | Nicola Dioli | Italy | 6.00 | 47.00 | 47.00 | |
| 16 | 1 | 16 | Martin Mikyska | Czech Republic | 46.66 | 32.66 | 46.66 | |
| 17 | 1 | 20 | Boris Karolcik | Slovakia | 8.00 | 37.33 | 37.33 | |
| 18 | 1 | 4 | Billy Morgan | Great Britain | 34.00 | 25.00 | 34.00 | |
| 18 | 1 | 13 | Mathias Weissenbacher | Austria | 20.33 | 34.00 | 34.00 | |
| 20 | 1 | 24 | Max Kralj Kos | Slovenia | 25.33 | DNS | 25.33 | |
| 21 | 1 | 14 | Petar Gyosharkov | Bulgaria | 11.66 | 23.33 | 23.33 | |
| 22 | 1 | 22 | David Kordiak | Slovakia | 2.66 | 16.66 | 16.66 | |
| 23 | 1 | 17 | Anton Mamaev | Russia | 14.00 | 14.00 | 14.00 | |
| 24 | 1 | 18 | Peter Podlogar | Slovenia | 12.66 | 11.00 | 12.66 | |
| 25 | 1 | 21 | Simeon Mitrev | Bulgaria | 4.00 | DNS | 4.00 | |
| 1 | 2 | 38 | Roope Tonteri | Finland | 67.00 | 93.66 | 93.66 | QF |
| 2 | 2 | 35 | Seamus O'Connor | Ireland | 85.66 | 90.33 | 90.33 | QF |
| 3 | 2 | 36 | Ryan Stassel | United States | 79.33 | 86.00 | 86.00 | QF |
| 4 | 2 | 49 | Jan Necas | Czech Republic | 77.00 | 52.00 | 77.00 | QF |
| 5 | 2 | 42 | Joris Ouwerkerk | Netherlands | 70.66 | 76.00 | 76.00 | QS |
| 6 | 2 | 39 | Nuutti Niemelae | Finland | 40.66 | 75.33 | 75.33 | QS |
| 7 | 2 | 34 | Niklas Mattsson | Sweden | 75.00 | 56.66 | 75.00 | QS |
| 8 | 2 | 50 | Simon Gruber | Italy | 21.00 | 59.66 | 59.66 | QS |
| 9 | 2 | 47 | Marco Grigis | Italy | 26.00 | 57.33 | 57.33 | |
| 10 | 2 | 45 | Martin Sire | Norway | 55.66 | 32.33 | 55.66 | |
| 11 | 2 | 40 | Ville Paumola | Finland | 44.33 | 54.66 | 54.66 | |
| 12 | 2 | 51 | Tit Stante | Slovenia | 11.66 | 52.00 | 52.00 | |
| 13 | 2 | 33 | Janne Korpi | Finland | 51.00 | 9.66 | 51.00 | |
| 14 | 2 | 55 | Martin Jaureguialzo | Argentina | 47.66 | 30.66 | 47.66 | |
| 15 | 2 | 46 | Chandler Hunt | United States | 17.66 | 46.66 | 46.66 | |
| 16 | 2 | 32 | Alexey Sobolev | Russia | 46.00 | 40.66 | 46.00 | |
| 17 | 2 | 41 | Lucas Baume | Switzerland | 9.33 | 39.33 | 39.33 | |
| 18 | 2 | 31 | Alois Lindmoser | Austria | 9.66 | 38.00 | 38.00 | |
| 19 | 2 | 54 | Matyas Szerb | Hungary | 37.00 | 18.00 | 37.00 | |
| 20 | 2 | 53 | Benedek Kis | Hungary | 28.33 | 34.33 | 34.33 | |
| 21 | 2 | 48 | Mikhail Matveev | Russia | 34.00 | 21.66 | 34.00 | |
| 22 | 2 | 44 | Brett Moody | United States | 23.00 | 28.00 | 28.00 | |
| 23 | 2 | 52 | Yuriy Chemodurov | Russia | 5.00 | 27.66 | 27.66 | |
| 24 | 2 | 43 | Florian Prietl | Austria | 7.00 | 27.33 | 27.33 | |
| | 2 | 37 | Jamie Nicholls | Great Britain | | | DNS | |

== Semifinal ==
The following are the results of the semifinal.

| Rank | Bib | Name | Country | Run 1 | Run 2 | Best | Notes |
|---|---|---|---|---|---|---|---|
| 1 | 6 | Darcy Sharpe | Canada | 90.25 | 53.75 | 90.25 | Q |
| 2 | 7 | Michael Ciccarelli | Canada | 18.75 | 87.25 | 87.25 | Q |
| 3 | 34 | Niklas Mattsson | Sweden | 82.25 | 49.00 | 82.25 | |
| 4 | 39 | Nuutti Niemelae | Finland | 81.50 | 24.25 | 81.50 | |
| 5 | 50 | Simon Gruber | Italy | 74.50 | 59.25 | 74.50 | |
| 6 | 23 | Tatsuki Imamura | Japan | 61.25 | 69.00 | 69.00 | |
| 7 | 19 | Kevin Kok | Italy | 19.75 | 17.50 | 19.75 | |
| 8 | 42 | Joris Ouwerkerk | Netherlands | 10.25 | 16.25 | 16.25 | |

== Final ==
The following are the results of the finals.

| Rank | Bib | Name | Country | Run 1 | Run 2 | Run 3 | Best |
|---|---|---|---|---|---|---|---|
| 1st place, gold medalist(s) | 36 | Ryan Stassel | United States | 94.00 | 51.00 | 97.50 | 97.50 |
| 2nd place, silver medalist(s) | 38 | Roope Tonteri | Finland | 60.75 | 90.00 | 93.75 | 93.75 |
| 3rd place, bronze medalist(s) | 1 | Kyle Mack | United States | 47.75 | 92.75 | 86.00 | 92.75 |
| 4 | 6 | Darcy Sharpe | Canada | 90.75 | 21.75 | 56.50 | 90.75 |
| 5 | 8 | Jonas Bösiger | Switzerland | 84.00 | 14.25 | 47.50 | 84.00 |
| 6 | 7 | Michael Ciccarelli | Canada | 58.75 | 82.25 | 49.00 | 82.25 |
| 7 | 49 | Jan Necas | Czech Republic | 78.75 | 6.50 | 72.75 | 78.75 |
| 8 | 10 | Philipp Kundratitz | Austria | 72.50 | 38.25 | 70.00 | 72.50 |
| 9 | 3 | Måns Hedberg | Sweden | 32.25 | 69.75 | 34.25 | 69.75 |
| 10 | 35 | Seamus O'Connor | Ireland | 54.50 | 48.75 | 2.75 | 54.50 |
