= FIS Freestyle Ski and Snowboarding World Championships 2015 – Men's big air =

The men's snowboard big air competition of the FIS Freestyle Ski and Snowboarding World Championships 2015 was held at Kreischberg, Austria on January 23 (qualifying) and January 24 (finals). 50 athletes from 18 countries competed.

== Qualification ==
The following are the results of the qualification.

Rank	Heat	Bib	Name	Country	Run 1	Run 2	Best	Notes
1	1	21	Ville Paumola	Finland	93.00	84.25	93.00	Q
2	1	16	Kyle Mack	United States	75.50	89.00	89.00	Q
3	1	12	Darcy Sharpe	Canada	31.50	85.75	85.75	Q
4	1	11	Michael Ciccarelli	Canada	81.00	77.00	81.00	Q
5	1	22	Lucien Koch	Switzerland	57.50	79.75	79.75	Q
6	1	13	Janne Korpi	Finland	64.00	78.00	78.00	
7	1	14	Jonas Bösiger	Switzerland	55.25	76.00	76.00	
8	1	24	Patrick Burgener	Switzerland	67.50	74.50	74.50	
9	1	32	Michael Roy	Canada	72.50	46.00	72.50	
10	1	17	Alexey Sobolev	Russia	25.00	72.25	72.25	
11	1	20	Nuutti Niemelae	Finland	66.00	62.00	66.00	
12	1	18	Rowan Coultas	Great Britain	54.25	60.75	60.75	
13	1	25	Petar Gyosharkov	Bulgaria	10.25	54.25	54.25	
14	1	35	Martin Jaureguialzo	Argentina	48.00	50.00	50.00	
15	1	33	David Kordiak	Slovakia	49.75	37.25	49.75	
16	1	26	Brett Moody	Great Britain	47.75	47.00	47.75	
17	1	27	Martin Sire	Norway	20.00	44.25	44.25	
18	1	34	Matyas Szerb	Hungary	42.25	27.75	42.25	
19	1	19	Stian Kleivdal	Norway	26.50	41.00	41.00	
20	1	15	Ryan Stassel	United States	39.25	33.25	39.25	
21	1	31	Jan Necas	Czech Republic	27.75	37.50	37.50	
22	1	23	Mathias Weissenbacher	Austria	33.50	29.50	33.50	
23	1	28	Chandler Hunt	United States	27.50	25.25	27.50	
24	1	30	Mikhail Matveev	Russia	23.75	15.75	23.75	
	1	29	Marco Grigis	Italy			DNS	
1	2	39	Roope Tonteri	Finland	93.25	22.50	93.25	Q
2	2	36	Billy Morgan	Great Britain	90.00	84.25	90.00	Q
3	2	53	Anton Mamaev	Russia	43.25	87.75	87.75	Q
4	2	40	Niklas Mattsson	Sweden	85.75	52.00	85.75	Q
5	2	37	Måns Hedberg	Sweden	81.25	84.75	84.75	Q
6	2	45	Philipp Kundratitz	Austria	82.50	83.50	83.50	
7	2	59	Sam Turnbull	Great Britain	79.00	27.25	79.00	
8	2	46	Sebbe de Buck	Belgium	70.75	78.00	78.00	
9	2	47	Joris Ouwerkerk	Netherlands	77.25	46.25	77.25	
10	2	38	Haakon Eilertsen	Norway	74.25	64.75	74.25	
11	2	51	Nicola Dioli	Italy	70.25	26.50	70.25	
12	2	42	Matts Kulisek	Canada	29.00	66.25	66.25	
13	2	52	Martin Mikyska	Czech Republic	64.00	28.00	64.00	
14	2	48	Aljosa Krivec	Slovenia	33.50	58.50	58.50	
15	2	55	Kevin Kok	Italy	57.50	49.25	57.50	
16	2	56	Simon Gruber	Italy	55.00	33.75	55.00	
17	2	50	Clemens Millauer	Austria	37.75	47.00	47.00	
17	2	43	Alois Lindmoser	Austria	46.25	47.00	47.00	
19	2	44	Petr Horak	Czech Republic	33.50	42.50	42.50	
20	2	58	Yuriy Chemodurov	Russia	19.50	40.75	40.75	
21	2	60	Mitja Kodric	Slovenia	38.25	28.50	38.25	
22	2	49	Carlos Gerber	Switzerland	38.00	28.75	38.00	
23	2	54	Peter Podlogar	Slovenia	35.75	29.75	35.75	
	2	57	Simeon Mitrev	Bulgaria			DNS	
	2	41	Petja Piiroinen	Finland			DNS	

== Final ==
The following are the results of the finals.

Rank	Bib	Name	Country	Run 1	Run 2	Run 3	2 Best
1st place, gold medalist(s)	1	Roope Tonteri	Finland	JNS	94.00	79.75	173.75
2nd place, silver medalist(s)	6	Darcy Sharpe	Canada	JNS	80.00	89.50	169.50
3rd place, bronze medalist(s)	4	Kyle Mack	United States	JNS	88.50	75.00	163.50
4	10	Lucien Koch	Switzerland	83.75	JNS	71.00	154.75
5	8	Michael Ciccarelli	Canada	79.00	74.50	JNS	153.50
6	7	Niklas Mattsson	Sweden	70.75	JNS	80.25	151.00
7	3	Billy Morgan	Great Britain	JNS	85.00	62.50	147.50
8	2	Ville Paumola	Finland	JNS	59.25	71.75	131.00
9	9	Måns Hedberg	Sweden	47.50	56.50	JNS	104.00
10	5	Anton Mamaev	Russia	JNS	27.50	7.00	34.50
