= FIS Snowboarding World Championships 2013 – Men's slopestyle =

The men's slopestyle competition of the 2013 FIS Snowboarding World Championships was held in Stoneham-et-Tewkesbury, Quebec on January 17 & 18, 2013. 72 athletes from 26 countries competed.

== Medalists ==
Gold	Roope Tonteri; Finland (FIN)
Silver	Mark McMorris; Canada (CAN)
Bronze	Janne Korpi; Finland (FIN)

== Results ==
=== Qualification ===
The following are the results of the qualification.

Rank	Heat	Bib	Name	Country	Run 1	Run 2	Best Score	Note
1	3	37	Sven Thorgren	Sweden	89.33	85.33	89.33	Q
2	4	57	Janne Korpi	Finland	85.00	DNS	85.00	Q
3	3	40	Roope Tonteri	Finland	80.66	84.33	84.33	Q
4	1	16	Mark McMorris	Canada	83.66	70.66	83.66	Q
5	1	1	Billy Morgan	Great Britain	16.00	80.00	80.00	Q
6	1	18	Stef Zeestraten	New Zealand	79.33	54.00	79.33	Q
7	1	10	Joris Ouwerkerk	Netherlands	78.66	21.33	78.66	Q
8	4	59	Ryan Stassel	United States	77.66	35.33	77.66	Q
9	1	8	Petja Piiroinen	Finland	77.00	5.66	77.00	Q
10	3	42	Sage Kotsenburg	United States	76.00	53.66	76.00	Q
11	2	22	Charles Guldemond	United States	75.33	61.66	75.33	Q
12	3	53	Matts Kulisek	Canada	28.00	75.33	75.33	Q
13	3	45	Martin Mikyska	Czech Republic	28.66	74.66	74.66	Q
14	4	61	Sebbe de Buck	Belgium	52.66	74.00	74.00	Q
15	2	19	Robby Balharry	Canada	50.66	71.33	71.33	Q
16	2	30	Clemens Schattschneider	Austria	69.66	40.00	69.66	Q
17	2	34	Scott James	Australia	53.33	66.66	66.66	Q
18	4	68	Adrian Krainer	Austria	31.00	66.66	66.66	Q
19	2	55	Jamie Nicholls	Great Britain	66.33	38.66	66.33	Q
20	4	66	Benjamin Comber	New Zealand	25.33	61.00	61.00	Q
21	3	44	Seamus O'Connor	Ireland	40.00	72.66	72.66	
22	1	3	Alexey Sobolev	Russia	69.66	69.66	69.66	
23	1	4	Peetu Piiroinen	Finland	DNS	69.33	69.33	
24	1	7	Tim-Kevin Ravnjak	Slovenia	47.66	68.33	68.33	
25	1	2	Dimi de Jong	Netherlands	52.66	64.33	64.33	
26	2	33	Marco Donzelli	Italy	22.33	63.33	63.33	
27	2	24	Teddy Koo	South Korea	61.00	12.66	61.00	
28	2	25	Lucien Koch	Switzerland	60.33	17.33	60.33	
29	1	37	Dusan Kriz	Czech Republic	38.33	60.00	60.00	
30	4	70	Sam Turnbull	Great Britain	15.66	57.66	57.66	
31	2	21	Seppe Smits	Belgium	38.33	57.00	57.00	
32	1	6	Michael Macho	Austria	13.66	55.66	55.66	
33	4	69	Cameron Staveley	Australia	43.00	53.66	53.66	
34	4	63	Petr Horak	Czech Republic	12.33	53.00	53.00	
35	3	48	Robbie Walker	Australia	52.00	20.66	52.00	
36	3	51	Filip Kavcic	Slovenia	15.33	51.33	51.33	
37	3	47	Rocco van Straten	Netherlands	14.00	51.00	51.00	
38	3	43	Mikhail Matveev	Russia	18.00	50.66	50.66	
39	3	54	Simon Gruber	Italy	50.33	20.33	50.33	
40	1	5	Tor Lundström	Sweden	41.33	46.00	46.00	
41	2	35	Kevin Kok	Italy	25.66	44.66	44.66	
42	4	62	Tomasz Wolak	Poland	26.66	43.33	43.33	
43	4	55	Jesper Kicken	Netherlands	42.33	21.33	42.33	
44	4	65	Mikhail Ilyin	Russia	13.00	38.00	38.00	
45	3	49	Viktor Szigeti	Hungary	35.33	37.33	37.33	
46	4	60	Carlos Manich	Spain	35.00	30.00	35.00	
47	3	39	Andre Christian Escobar	Chile	34.66	30.66	30.66	
48	3	38	Marcos Vinicius Batista	Brazil	17.00	34.33	34.33	
49	1	9	Jan Necas	Czech Republic	32.66	14.33	14.33	
50	2	20	Craig McMorris	Canada	20.00	29.00	29.00	
51	2	23	Nate Kern	Great Britain	27.00	8.00	27.00	
51	4	67	Sulev Paalo	Estonia	27.00	17.66	27.00	
53	2	26	Mario Visnap	Estonia	26.33	21.33	26.33	
53	1	15	Declan Vogel-Paul	Australia	17.66	26.33	26.33	
55	2	29	Carles Torner	Spain	21.00	25.00	25.00	
56	4	64	Joel Staub	Switzerland	24.33	23.33	23.33	
57	1	17	Anton Lavrentyev	Russia	23.66	16.33	23.66	
58	3	50	Eric Willett	United States	23.00	23.33	23.33	
59	2	31	Lozio Dimitrov	Bulgaria	22.66	15.66	22.66	
60	2	28	Inaqui Irarrazabal	Chile	15.66	20.00	20.00	
60	1	14	Leandro Eigensatz	Switzerland	7.00	20.00	20.00	
62	3	46	Niklas Mattsson	Sweden	18.33	17.33	18.33	
62	4	56	Marco Grigis	Italy	18.33	DNS	18.33	
64	3	41	Santiago Gamen	Argentina	15.66	15.66	15.66	
65	1	12	David Hablützel	Switzerland	13.00	5.33	13.00	
66	2	36	Fu Yu-Chin	Chinese Taipei	8.00	DNS	8.00	
67	4	72	Marko Grilc	Slovenia	5.66	DNS	5.66	
	1	11	Wen Yan-Bor	Chinese Taipei	DNS	DNS	DNS	
	2	32	Georgi Peltekov	Bulgaria	DNS	DNS	DNS	
	3	52	Aljosa Krivec	Slovenia	DNS	DNS	DNS	
	4	58	Matias Schmitt	Argentina	DNS	DNS	DNS	
	4	71	Mathias Weissenbacher	Austria	DNS	DNS	DNS	

=== Final ===
Rank	Bib	Name	Country	Run 1	Run 2	Best Score	Notes
1st place, gold medalist(s)	40	Roope Tonteri	Finland	80.50	93.75	93.75	
2nd place, silver medalist(s)	16	Mark McMorris	Canada	92.50	87.75	92.50	
3rd place, bronze medalist(s)	57	Janne Korpi	Finland	71.25	90.75	90.75	
4	1	Billy Morgan	Great Britain	4.00	85.25	85.25	
5	9	Clemens Schattschneider	Austria	38.50	84.50	84.50	
6	19	Robby Balharry	Canada	40.75	77.50	77.50	
7	59	Ryan Stassel	United States	74.25	17.75	74.25	
8	68	Adrian Krainer	Austria	30.50	71.50	71.50	
9	8	Petja Piiroinen	Finland	71.00	14.75	71.00	
10	53	Matts Kulisek	Canada	67.50	19.75	67.50	
11	22	Charles Guldemond	United States	21.75	66.25	66.25	
12	61	Sebbe de Buck	Belgium	44.75	64.00	64.00	
13	10	Joris Ouwerkerk	Netherlands	54.25	14.00	54.25	
14	27	Jamie Nicholls	Great Britain	52.50	53.00	53.00	
15	18	Stef Zeestraten	New Zealand	41.00	50.50	50.50	
16	34	Scott James	Australia	18.25	38.25	38.25	
17	45	Martin Mikyska	Czech Republic	26.75	34.50	34.50	
18	37	Sven Thorgren	Sweden	13.50	25.75	25.75	
19	66	Benjamin Comber	New Zealand	21.50	14.75	21.50	
20	42	Sage Kotsenburg	United States	20.50	12.25	20.50	
