= 2016–17 FIS Snowboard World Cup =

International snowboarding competition

Snowboard World Cup 2016/17
Discipline	Men	Women
Parallel overall	(Austria) Andreas Prommegger	(Czech Republic) Ester Ledecká
Parallel giant slalom	(Bulgaria) Radoslav Yankov	(Russia) Alena Zavarzina
Parallel slalom	(Italy) Aaron March	(Austria) Daniela Ulbing
Freestyle overall	(Canada) Mark McMorris	(Austria) Anna Gasser
Snowboard cross	(France) Pierre Vaultier	(Czech Republic) Eva Samková
Halfpipe	(Australia) Scotty James	(United States) Chloe Kim
Slopestyle	(United States) Redmond Gerard	(United States) Jamie Anderson
Big Air	(Canada) Mark McMorris	(Austria) Anna Gasser
FIS Super Series	(Canada) Mark McMorris	(Austria) Anna Gasser

Competition
Locations	25	25
Individual	33	33
Team	5	5

The 2016–17 FIS Snowboard World Cup was 23rd multi race season in snowboarding. Competition consisted of the parallel slalom, parallel giant slalom, snowboard cross, halfpipe, slopestyle and big air.

== Men ==
=== Parallel ===
Date	Place	Event	Winner	Second	Third	Ref.
15 December 2016	(Italy) Carezza	PGS	(Austria) Benjamin Karl	(Russia) Andrey Sobolev	(Bulgaria) Radoslav Yankov	
17 December 2016	(Italy) Cortina d'Ampezzo	PSL	(Russia) Andrey Sobolev	(Italy) Roland Fischnaller	(Austria) Benjamin Karl	
10 January 2017	(Austria) Bad Gastein	PSL	(Italy) Christoph Mick	(Switzerland) Kaspar Flütsch	(Austria) Andreas Prommegger	
28 January 2017	(Slovenia) Rogla	PGS	(Switzerland) Nevin Galmarini	(Bulgaria) Radoslav Yankov	(Slovenia) Žan Košir	
3 February 2017	(Bulgaria) Bansko	PGS	(Bulgaria) Radoslav Yankov	(Switzerland) Nevin Galmarini	(Austria) Benjamin Karl	
5 February 2017	(Bulgaria) Bansko	PGS	(France) Sylvain Dufour	(Bulgaria) Radoslav Yankov	(Germany) Stefan Baumeister	
12 February 2017	(South Korea) Bokwang	PGS	(Austria) Andreas Prommegger	(Austria) Sebastian Kislinger	(Italy) Aaron March	
25 February 2017	(Russia) Moscow	PSL	Cancelled due to organizational issues			
5 March 2017	(Turkey) Kayseri	PGS	(Austria) Andreas Prommegger	(South Korea) Lee Sang-ho	(South Korea) Choi Bo-gun	
18 March 2017	(Germany) Winterberg	PSL	(Germany) Stefan Baumeister	(Italy) Aaron March	(Austria) Alexander Payer	

=== Snowboard Cross ===
Date	Place	Event	Winner	Second	Third	Ref.
16 December 2016	(Austria) Montafon	SBX	(United States) Hagen Kearney	(Italy) Omar Visintin	(Australia) Alex Pullin	
21 January 2017	(United States) Solitude	SBX	(Austria) Alessandro Hämmerle	(Italy) Omar Visintin	(United States) Alex Deibold	
4 February 2017	(Bulgaria) Bansko	SBX	(Austria) Alessandro Hämmerle	(France) Pierre Vaultier	(Canada) Baptiste Brochu	
11 February 2017	(Germany) Feldberg	SBX	(France) Pierre Vaultier	(Spain) Lucas Eguibar	(Italy) Omar Visintin	
12 February 2017	(Germany) Feldberg	SBX	(Australia) Alex Pullin	(Australia) Jarryd Hughes	(Austria) Alessandro Hämmerle	
26 February 2017	(Russia) Kazan	SBX	Cancelled			
5 March 2017	(Spain) La Molina	SBX	(France) Pierre Vaultier	(Austria) Lukas Pachner	(United States) Nick Baumgartner	
25 March 2017	(Switzerland) Veysonnaz	SBX	(France) Pierre Vaultier	(United States) Alex Deibold	(Australia) Alex Pullin	

=== Big Air ===
Date	Place	Event	Winner	Second	Third	Ref.
12 November 2016	(Italy) Milan	BA	(Norway) Marcus Kleveland	(Belgium) Seppe Smits	(Canada) Mark McMorris	
14 November 2016	(South Korea) Alpensia	BA	(Canada) Mark McMorris	(Canada) Max Parrot	(United States) Ryan Stassel	
3 December 2016	(Germany) Mönchengladbach	BA	(Finland) Roope Tonteri	(Switzerland) Jonas Bösinger	(United Kingdom) Billy Morgan	
17 December 2016	(United States) Cooper	BA	(Canada) Max Parrot	(Canada) Sebastien Toutant	(United States) Ryan Stassel	
7 January 2017	(Russia) Moscow	BA	(Russia) Vlad Khadarin	(Canada) Antoine Truchon	(Norway) Fridtjof Tischendorf	
11 February 2017	(Canada) Quebec City	BA	(Canada) Mark McMorris	(Canada) Max Parrot	(Russia) Anton Mamaev	
FIS Super Series (12 November 2016 – 11 February 2017)			(Canada) Mark McMorris	(Belgium) Seppe Smits	(Norway) Marcus Kleveland	

=== Slopestyle ===
Date	Place	Event	Winner	Second	Third	Ref.
14 January 2017	(Austria) Kreischberg	SBS	(Norway) Mons Roysland	(United States) Ryan Stassel	(United States) Redmond Gerard	
20 January 2017	(Switzerland) Laax	SBS	(Canada) Max Parrot	(Canada) Mark McMorris	(Canada) Tyler Nicholson	
27 January 2017	(Italy) Seiser Alm	SBS	(Belgium) Seppe Smits	(United Kingdom) Jamie Nicholls	(Belgium) Sebbe de Buck	
5 February 2017	(United States) Mammoth	SBS	(United States) Redmond Gerard	(United States) Kyle Mack	(United States) Dylan Thomas	
12 February 2017	(Canada) Quebec City	SBS	(Canada) Sebastien Toutant	(Canada) Mark McMorris	(Norway) Marcus Kleveland	
25 March 2017	(Czech Republic) Špindlerův Mlýn	SBS	(United States) Chris Corning	(Norway) Fridtjof Tischendorf	(United Kingdom) Jamie Nicholls	

=== Halfpipe ===
Date	Place	Event	Winner	Second	Third	Ref.
16 December 2016	(United States) Cooper	HP	(Switzerland) Patrick Burgener	(Switzerland) Iouri Podladtchikov	(United States) Chase Josey	
21 January 2017	(Switzerland) Laax	HP	(United States) Chase Josey	(Australia) Scotty James	(Switzerland) Iouri Podladtchikov	
5 February 2017	(United States) Mammoth	HP	(United States) Shaun White	(United States) Ryan Wachendorfer	(United States) Louie Vito	
19 February 2017	(South Korea) Bokwang	HP	(Australia) Scotty James	(United States) Shaun White	(China) Zhang Yiwei	

== Women ==
=== Parallel ===
Date	Place	Event	Winner	Second	Third	Ref.
15 December 2016	(Italy) Carezza	PGS	(Austria) Ina Meschik	(Czech Republic) Ester Ledecká	(Russia) Alena Zavarzina	
17 December 2016	(Italy) Cortina d'Ampezzo	PSL	(Czech Republic) Ester Ledecká	(Austria) Daniela Ulbing	(Italy) Nadya Ochner	
10 January 2017	(Austria) Bad Gastein	PSL	(Austria) Daniela Ulbing	(Netherlands) Michelle Dekker	(Austria) Sabine Schöffmann	
28 January 2017	(Slovenia) Rogla	PGS	(Czech Republic) Ester Ledecká	(Germany) Carolin Langenhorst	(Austria) Ina Meschik	
3 February 2017	(Bulgaria) Bansko	PGS	(Switzerland) Patrizia Kummer	(Austria) Julia Dujmovits	(Switzerland) Ladina Jenny	
5 February 2017	(Bulgaria) Bansko	PGS	(Russia) Alena Zavarzina	(Switzerland) Patrizia Kummer	(Japan) Tomoka Takeuchi	
12 February 2017	(South Korea) Bokwang	PGS	(Russia) Alena Zavarzina	(Switzerland) Patrizia Kummer	(Switzerland) Julie Zogg	
25 February 2017	(Russia) Moscow	PSL	Cancelled due to organizational issues			
5 March 2017	(Turkey) Kayseri	PGS	(Czech Republic) Ester Ledecká	(Japan) Tomoka Takeuchi	(Germany) Ramona Hofmeister	
18 March 2017	(Germany) Winterberg	PSL	(Austria) Sabine Schöffmann	(Czech Republic) Ester Ledecká	(Austria) Julia Dujmovits	

=== Snowboard Cross ===
Date	Place	Event	Winner	Second	Third	Ref.
16 December 2016	(Austria) Montafon	SBX	(Australia) Belle Brockhoff	(France) Chloé Trespeuch	(United States) Lindsey Jacobellis	
21 January 2017	(United States) Solitude	SBX	(Czech Republic) Eva Samková	(Italy) Michela Moioli	(United States) Lindsey Jacobellis	
4 February 2017	(Bulgaria) Bansko	SBX	(Australia) Belle Brockhoff	(Czech Republic) Eva Samková	(France) Chloé Trespeuch	
11 February 2017	(Germany) Feldberg	SBX	(Italy) Michela Moioli	(Australia) Belle Brockhoff	(Canada) Meryeta Odine	
12 February 2017	(Germany) Feldberg	SBX	(Czech Republic) Eva Samková	(United States) Lindsey Jacobellis	(France) Chloé Trespeuch	
26 February 2017	(Russia) Kazan	SBX	Cancelled			
5 March 2017	(Spain) La Molina	SBX	(Italy) Michela Moioli	(Czech Republic) Eva Samková	(France) Chloé Trespeuch	
25 March 2017	(Switzerland) Veysonnaz	SBX	(France) Charlotte Bankes	(Czech Republic) Eva Samková	(Italy) Michela Moioli	

=== Big Air ===
Date	Place	Event	Winner	Second	Third	Ref.
12 November 2016	(Italy) Milan	BA	(Austria) Anna Gasser	(United States) Hailey Langland	(Czech Republic) Šárka Pančochová	
14 November 2016	(South Korea) Alpensia	BA	(Austria) Anna Gasser	(United States) Julia Marino	(United Kingdom) Katie Ormerod	
3 December 2016	(Germany) Mönchengladbach	BA	(Austria) Anna Gasser	(United Kingdom) Katie Ormerod	(Japan) Miyabi Onitsuka	
17 December 2016	(United States) Cooper	BA	(United States) Jamie Anderson	(Finland) Enni Rukajärvi	(Slovakia) Klaudia Medlová	
7 January 2017	(Russia) Moscow	BA	(United Kingdom) Katie Ormerod	(Austria) Anna Gasser	(Slovakia) Klaudia Medlová	
11 February 2017	(Canada) Quebec City	BA	(Austria) Anna Gasser	(United States) Julia Marino	(New Zealand) Zoi Sadowski-Synnott	
FIS Super Series (12 November 2016 – 11 February 2017)			(Austria) Anna Gasser	(United Kingdom) Katie Ormerod	(Japan) Miyabi Onitsuka	

=== Slopestyle ===
Date	Place	Event	Winner	Second	Third	Ref.
14 January 2017	(Austria) Kreischberg	SBS	(Austria) Anna Gasser	(Switzerland) Sina Candrian	(Norway) Silje Norendal	
20 January 2017	(Switzerland) Laax	SBS	(Finland) Enni Rukajärvi	(Austria) Anna Gasser	(United States) Jamie Anderson	
27 January 2017	(Italy) Seiser Alm	SBS	(Finland) Enni Rukajärvi	(Canada) Laurie Blouin	(Switzerland) Sina Candrian	
5 February 2017	(United States) Mammoth	SBS	(United States) Jamie Anderson	(United States) Hailey Langland	(United States) Julia Marino	
12 February 2017	(Canada) Quebec City	SBS	(United States) Julia Marino	(United States) Jamie Anderson	(Canada) Brooke Voigt	
25 March 2017	(Czech Republic) Špindlerův Mlýn	SBS	(New Zealand) Zoi Sadowski-Synnott	(Canada) Spencer O'Brien	(Germany) Silvia Mittermüller	

=== Halfpipe ===
Date	Place	Event	Winner	Second	Third	Ref.
16 December 2016	(United States) Cooper	HP	(United States) Chloe Kim	(China) Liu Jiayu	(China) Cai Xuetong	
21 January 2017	(Switzerland) Laax	HP	(United States) Chloe Kim	(United States) Arielle Gold	(China) Cai Xuetong	
5 February 2017	(United States) Mammoth	HP	(United States) Kelly Clark	(Japan) Haruna Matsumoto	(United States) Hannah Teter	
19 February 2017	(South Korea) Bokwang	HP	(United States) Kelly Clark	(China) Liu Jiayu	(China) Cai Xuetong	

== Team ==
=== Snowboard cross men ===
Date	Place	Event	Winner	Second	Third	Ref.
18 December 2016	(Austria) Montafon	SBX	Spain I Regino Hernández; Lucas Eguibar	Italy I Omar Visintin; Emanuel Perathoner	United States II Alex Deibold; Nick Baumgartner	
22 January 2017	(United States) Solitude	SBX	Italy I Luca Matteotti; Emanuel Perathoner	Austria II Julian Lueftner; Lukas Pachner	United States I Nate Holland; Alex Deibold	
26 March 2017	(Switzerland) Veysonnaz	SBX	Austria I Markus Schairer; Alessandro Hämmerle	United States II Jonathan Cheever; Mick Dierdorff	Canada I Chris Robanske; Kevin Hill	

=== Snowboard cross ladies ===
Date	Place	Event	Winner	Second	Third	Ref.
18 December 2016	(Austria) Montafon	SBX	France I Nelly Moenne Loccoz; Chloé Trespeuch	Italy I Raffaella Brutto; Michela Moioli	France II Manon Petit; Charlotte Bankes	
22 January 2017	(United States) Solitude	SBX	United States I Lindsey Jacobellis; Rosina Mancari	France I Nelly Moenne Loccoz; Chloé Trespeuch	Italy I Raffaella Brutto; Michela Moioli	
26 March 2017	(Switzerland) Veysonnaz	SBX	Italy I Raffaella Brutto; Michela Moioli	France I Nelly Moenne Loccoz; Chloé Trespeuch	Canada I Carle Brenneman; Tess Critchlow	

=== Parallel mixed ===
Date	Place	Event	Winner	Second	Third	Ref.
11 January 2017	(Austria) Bad Gastein	PSLT	Austria I Daniela Ulbing; Benjamin Karl	Switzerland II Patrizia Kummer; Nevin Galbarini	Austria III Claudia Riegler; Andreas Prommegger	
19 March 2017	(Germany) Winterberg	PSLT	Italy I Nadya Ochner; Aaron March	Austria I Daniela Ulbing; Andreas Prommegger	Germany I Carolin Langenhorst; Stefan Baumeister	

== Men's standings ==
=== Parallel overall (PSL/PGS) ===
Rank		Points
1	(Austria) Andreas Prommegger	4500
2	(Bulgaria) Radoslav Yankov	4310
3	(Austria) Benjamin Karl	3680
4	(Switzerland) Nevin Galmarini	3566.5
5	(South Korea) Lee Sang-ho	3280

- Standings after 9 races.

=== Parallel slalom ===
Rank		Points
1	(Italy) Aaron March	1560
2	(Germany) Stefan Baumeister	1440
3	(Italy) Christoph Mick	1410
4	(Italy) Roland Fischnaller	1350
5	(Austria) Andreas Prommegger	1200

- Standings after 3 races.

=== Parallel giant slalom ===
Rank		Points
1	(Bulgaria) Radoslav Yankov	3630
2	(Austria) Andreas Prommegger	3300
3	(Austria) Benjamin Karl	2920
4	(Switzerland) Nevin Galmarini	2718.5
5	(South Korea) Lee Sang-ho	2470

- Standings after 6 races.

=== Snowboard Cross ===
Rank		Points
1	(France) Pierre Vaultier	4450
2	(Italy) Omar Visintin	3920
3	(Austria) Alessandro Hämmerle	3404.6
4	(Australia) Alex Pullin	3390
5	(United States) Hagen Kearney	2580

- Standings after 7 races.

=== Freestyle overall (BA/SBS/HP) ===
Rank		Points
1	(Canada) Mark McMorris	4200
2	(Canada) Max Parrot	3617.6
3	(Belgium) Seppe Smits	3320
4	(United States) Redmond Gerard	2900
5	(Australia) Scotty James	2700

- Standings after 16 races.

=== Big Air ===
Rank		Points
1	(Canada) Mark McMorris	2600
2	(Canada) Max Parrot	2600
3	(Belgium) Seppe Smits	2190
4	(Finland) Roope Tonteri	1768.8
5	(United States) Ryan Stassel	1720

- Standings after 6 races.

=== Slopestyle ===
Rank		Points
1	(United States) Redmond Gerard	2460
2	(United Kingdom) Jamie Nicholls	2040
3	(Canada) Mark McMorris	1600
4	(Belgium) Seppe Smits	1526
5	(United States) Brock Crouch	1410

- Standings after 6 races.

=== Halfpipe ===
Rank		Points
1	(Australia) Scotty James	2700
2	(United States) Chase Josey	2360
3	(United States) Shaun White	1930
4	(Switzerland) Iouri Podladtchikov	1660
5	(Switzerland) Patrick Burgener	1610

- Standings after 4 races.

=== FIS Super Series ===
Rank		Points
1	(Canada) Mark McMorris	1600
2	(Belgium) Seppe Smits	1460
3	(Canada) Marcus Kleveland	1400
4	(Finland) Roope Tonteri	1220
5	(Russia) Anton Mamaev	1130

- Standings after 3 races.

== Ladies' standings ==
=== Parallel overall (PSL/PGS) ===
Rank		Points
1	(Czech Republic) Ester Ledecká	4860
2	(Russia) Alena Zavarzina	4500
3	(Switzerland) Patrizia Kummer	4060
4	(Austria) Sabine Schöffmann	3470
5	(Austria) Ina Meschik	3260

- Standings after 9 races.

=== Parallel slalom ===
Rank		Points
1	(Austria) Daniela Ulbing	2300
2	(Czech Republic) Ester Ledecká	2060
3	(Austria) Sabine Schöffmann	2000
4	(Netherlands) Michelle Decker	1226
5	(Switzerland) Julie Zogg	1130

- Standings after 3 races.

=== Parallel giant slalom ===
Rank		Points
1	(Russia) Alena Zavarzina	3900
2	(Switzerland) Patrizia Kummer	3460
3	(Czech Republic) Ester Ledecká	2800
4	(Austria) Ina Meschik	2430
5	(Japan) Tomoka Takeuchi	2420

- Standings after 6 races.

=== Snowboard Cross ===
Rank		Points
1	(Czech Republic) Eva Samková	5170
2	(Italy) Michela Moioli	4490
3	(Australia) Belle Brockhoff	4060
4	(France) Chloé Trespeuch	3740
5	(United States) Lindsey Jacobellis	3220

- Standings after 7 races.

=== Freestyle overall (BA/SBS/HP) ===
Rank		Points
1	(Austria) Anna Gasser	5800
2	(United States) Jamie Anderson	4210
3	(United States) Julia Marino	4200
4	(United Kingdom) Katie Ormerod	3610
5	(Finland) Enni Rukajärvi	3160

- Standings after 16 races.

=== Big Air ===
Rank		Points
1	(Austria) Anna Gasser	4800
2	(United Kingdom) Katie Ormerod	3350
3	(United States) Julia Marino	2250
4	(Slovakia) Klaudia Medlová	1880
5	(United States) Jamie Anderson	1810

- Standings after 6 races.

=== Slopestyle ===
Rank		Points
1	(United States) Jamie Anderson	2400
2	(United States) Julia Marino	2215
3	(Austria) Anna Gasser	2200
4	(Finland) Enni Rukajärvi	2000
5	(United Kingdom) Aimee Fuller	1648.5

- Standings after 6 races.

=== Halfpipe ===
Rank		Points
1	(United States) Chloe Kim	3000
2	(United States) Kelly Clark	2500
3	(China) Liu Jiayu	2500
4	(China) Cai Xuetong	1960
5	(Japan) Haruna Matsumoto	1450

- Standings after 4 races.

=== FIS Super Series ===
Rank		Points
1	(Austria) Anna Gasser	3000
2	(United Kingdom) Katie Ormerod	1300
3	(Japan) Miyabi Onitsuka	1000
4	(Czech Republic) Šárka Pančochová	980
5	(United Kingdom) Almee Fuller	970

- Standings after 3 races.

== Podium table by nation ==
Table showing the World Cup podium places (gold–1st place, silver–2nd place, bronze–3rd place) by the countries represented by the athletes.

Rank	Nation	Gold	Silver	Bronze	Total
1	Austria	15	8	9	32
2	United States	13	13	15	41
3	Italy	6	7	5	18
4	France	6	4	4	14
5	Canada	5	8	7	20
6	Czech Republic	5	5	1	11
7	Australia	4	3	2	9
8	Russia	4	1	2	7
9	Switzerland	3	8	4	15
10	Finland	3	1	0	4
11	Norway	2	1	3	6
12	Great Britain	1	2	3	6
13	Bulgaria	1	2	1	4
14	Germany	1	1	4	6
15	Belgium	1	1	1	3
16	Spain	1	1	0	2
17	New Zealand	1	0	1	2
18	China	0	2	4	6
19	Japan	0	2	2	4
20	South Korea	0	1	1	2
21	Netherlands	0	1	0	1
22	Slovakia	0	0	2	2
23	Slovenia	0	0	1	1
Totals (23 entries)		72	72	72	216
