= Snowboarding at the 2014 Winter Olympics – Men's slopestyle =

Men's slopestyle at the XXII Olympic Winter Games
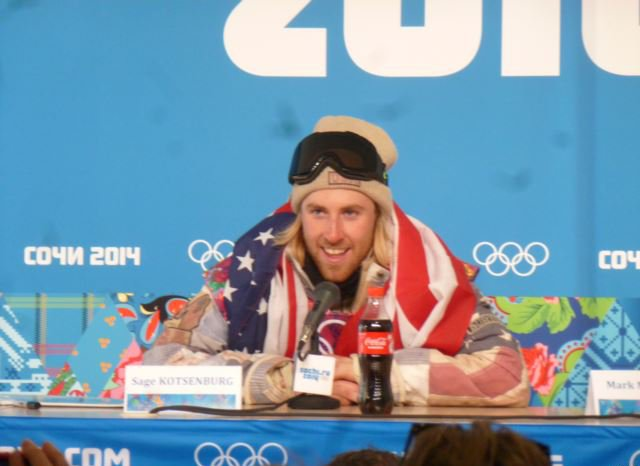
- Sage Kotsenburg at a news conference after winning the gold medal
- Venue: Rosa Khutor Extreme Park
- Date: 6 February 2014 (qualification); 8 February 2014 (semifinals & final)
- Competitors: 29 from 13 nations
- Winning Score: 93.50

Medalists
1st place, gold medalist(s)		Sage Kotsenburg	United States
2nd place, silver medalist(s)		Ståle Sandbech	Norway
3rd place, bronze medalist(s)		Mark McMorris	Canada

The men's slopestyle competition of the 2014 Winter Olympics in Sochi were held at Rosa Khutor Extreme Park on 6 February (qualification) and 8 February (semifinals and final). This was the first time that a slopestyle event was included in the Olympic program.

Norwegian snowboarder Torstein Horgmo, who was considered one of the medal contenders, fractured his collarbone after a crash in practice in the week before the Games, and had to miss the Olympics. His crash and complaints from other athletes that some jumps were too steep have prompted organizers to modify the slopestyle course.

The gold was won by American Sage Kotsenburg, followed by Norwegian Ståle Sandbech at silver place, and Canadian Mark McMorris won the bronze medal.

== Qualification ==
An athlete must have placed in the top 30 in at a World Cup event after July 2012 or at the 2013 World Championships and a minimum of 50 FIS points. A total of 30 quota spots are available to athletes to compete at the games. A maximum of four athletes can be entered by a National Olympic Committee.

Shaun White of the United States, who was among the qualifiers, withdrew, leaving a total of 29 athletes competing.

== Schedule ==
All times are (UTC+4).

Date	Time	Round
6 February	10:00	Qualification
8 February	9:30	Semifinal
8 February	12:45	Final

== Results ==
=== Qualification ===
The top 4 riders from each heat automatically qualify for the final round. The remaining riders qualify for the semifinal round. The result is calculated as the best score of the two runs. The following were the results of the qualification round:

QF — Qualified directly for the Final
QS — Qualified for the Semifinal
Bib — Bib number
DNS — Did Not Start
Tie — Tie breaking points

Rank	Heat	Bib	Name	Country	Run 1	Run 2	Best	Notes
1	1	8	Ståle Sandbech	Norway	45.25	94.50	94.50	QF
2	1	12	Peetu Piiroinen	Finland	90.75	80.00	90.75	QF
3	1	7	Sebastien Toutant	Canada	74.25	87.25	87.25	QF
4	1	14	Jamie Nicholls	Great Britain	62.25	86.75	86.75	QF
5	1	10	Chas Guldemond	United States	86.00	19.25	86.00	QS
6	1	1	Billy Morgan	Great Britain	76.25	85.50	85.50	QS
7	1	5	Niklas Mattsson	Sweden	82.75	57.25	82.75	QS
8	1	6	Emil André Ulsletten	Norway	27.25	79.75	79.75	QS
9	1	3	Charles Reid	Canada	54.50	75.50	75.50	QS
10	1	9	Alexey Sobolev	Russia	63.00	28.50	63.00	QS
11	1	11	Scott James	Australia	36.00	44.00	44.00	QS
12	1	13	Lucien Koch	Switzerland	32.00	29.25	32.00	QS
13	1	4	Yuki Kadono	Japan	31.00	16.50	31.00	QS
14	1	15	Mathias Weissenbacher	Austria	18.00	28.75	28.75	QS
15	1	2	Torgeir Bergrem	Norway	25.00	24.75	25.00	QS
1	2	19	Maxence Parrot	Canada	91.75	97.50	97.50	QF
2	2	18	Roope Tonteri	Finland	33.75	95.75	95.75	QF
3	2	21	Sven Thorgren	Sweden	94.25	36.75	94.25	QF
4	2	16	Gjermund Bråten	Norway	12.75	91.25	91.25	QF
5	2	20	Seppe Smits	Belgium	88.25	91.00	91.00	QS
6	2	25	Clemens Schattschneider	Austria	90.00	24.25	90.00	QS
7	2	24	Mark McMorris	Canada	29.50	89.25	89.25	QS
8	2	22	Sage Kotsenburg	United States	86.50	81.50	86.50	QS
9	2	29	Ryan Stassel	United States	81.00	28.75	81.00	QS
10	2	17	Jan Scherrer	Switzerland	74.50	18.75	74.50	QS
11	2	23	Ville Paumola	Finland	54.75	21.25	54.75	QS
12	2	27	Janne Korpi	Finland	49.75	35.50	49.75	QS
13	2	26	Seamus O'Connor	Ireland	33.50	40.00	40.00	QS
14	2	28	Adrian Krainer	Austria	24.25	16.00	24.25	QS

=== Semifinal ===
The top 4 riders from the semifinal round qualify for the final round. The result is calculated as the best score of the two runs.

Rank	Bib	Name	Country	Run 1	Run 2	Best	Notes
1	1	Billy Morgan	Great Britain	90.75	35.50	90.75	QF
2	22	Sage Kotsenburg	United States	89.00	90.50	90.50	QF
3	24	Mark McMorris	Canada	55.50	89.25	89.25	QF
4	4	Yuki Kadono	Japan	84.75	80.50	84.75	QF
5	20	Seppe Smits	Belgium	77.50	84.50	84.50	
6	29	Ryan Stassel	United States	83.25	81.75	83.25	
7	10	Chas Guldemond	United States	13.25	79.75	79.75	
8	11	Scott James	Australia	77.25	19.00	77.25	
9	26	Seamus O'Connor	Ireland	60.75	70.25	70.25	
10	27	Janne Korpi	Finland	41.00	68.50	68.50	
11	17	Jan Scherrer	Switzerland	64.25	23.50	64.25	
12	9	Alexey Sobolev	Russia	20.00	57.50	57.50	
13	6	Emil André Ulsletten	Norway	22.50	56.75	56.75	
14	3	Charles Reid	Canada	46.25	43.50	46.25	
15	5	Niklas Mattsson	Sweden	44.75	36.50	44.75	
16	2	Torgeir Bergrem	Norway	37.50	26.75	37.50	
17	25	Clemens Schattschneider	Austria	29.50	26.25	29.50	
18	15	Mathias Weissenbacher	Austria	14.00	28.50	28.50	
19	23	Ville Paumola	Finland	25.25	22.75	25.25	
20	13	Lucien Koch	Switzerland	16.25	20.75	20.75	
	28	Adrian Krainer	Austria				DNS

=== Final ===
The result is calculated as the best score of the two runs.

Rank	Bib	Name	Country	Run 1	Run 2	Best
1st place, gold medalist(s)	22	Sage Kotsenburg	United States	93.50	83.25	93.50
2nd place, silver medalist(s)	8	Ståle Sandbech	Norway	27.00	91.75	91.75
3rd place, bronze medalist(s)	24	Mark McMorris	Canada	33.75	88.75	88.75
4	21	Sven Thorgren	Sweden	83.75	87.50	87.50
5	19	Maxence Parrot	Canada	47.00	87.25	87.25
6	14	Jamie Nicholls	Great Britain	85.50	46.50	85.50
7	12	Peetu Piiroinen	Finland	78.50	81.25	81.25
8	4	Yuki Kadono	Japan	53.00	75.75	75.75
9	7	Sebastien Toutant	Canada	54.50	58.50	58.50
10	1	Billy Morgan	Great Britain	38.00	39.75	39.75
11	18	Roope Tonteri	Finland	31.50	39.00	39.00
12	16	Gjermund Bråten	Norway	24.75	20.50	24.75
