= Norway at the 2014 Winter Olympics =

- IOC code: NOR
- NOC: Norwegian Olympic Committee and Confederation of Sports
- Website: www.idrett.no (in Norwegian)

in Sochi
- Competitors: 134 in 12 sports
- Flag bearers: Aksel Lund Svindal (opening); Ole Einar Bjørndalen (closing)
- Medals Ranked 1st: Gold 11 Silver 6 Bronze 10 Total 27

Winter Olympics appearances (overview)
- 1924; 1928; 1932; 1936; 1948; 1952; 1956; 1960; 1964; 1968; 1972; 1976; 1980; 1984; 1988; 1992; 1994; 1998; 2002; 2006; 2010; 2014; 2018; 2022; 2026

Norway competed at the 2014 Winter Olympics in Sochi, Russia, from 7 to 23 February 2014.

The 2014 Games marked the first time a Norwegian Olympic team competed in Russia, as Norway and 64 western countries took part at the American-led boycott in the 1980 Summer Olympics held in Moscow due to the Soviet–Afghan War.

== Medalists ==
Medals by sport
Sport	1st place, gold medalist(s)	2nd place, silver medalist(s)	3rd place, bronze medalist(s)	Total
Cross-country skiing	5	2	4	11
Biathlon	3	2	2	7
Nordic combined	2	1	1	4
Alpine skiing	1	0	2	3
Snowboarding	0	1	0	1
Ski jumping	0	0	1	1
Total	11	6	10	27

Medals by date
Day	Date	1st place, gold medalist(s)	2nd place, silver medalist(s)	3rd place, bronze medalist(s)	Total
Day 1	8 February	2	1	1	4
Day 2	9 February	0	0	3	3
Day 3	10 February	0	0	0	0
Day 4	11 February	2	2	0	4
Day 5	12 February	0	0	1	1
Day 6	13 February	0	0	1	1
Day 7	14 February	0	0	0	0
Day 8	15 February	0	0	0	0
Day 9	16 February	1	0	0	1
Day 10	17 February	0	0	1	1
Day 11	18 February	2	1	0	3
Day 12	19 February	2	0	0	2
Day 13	20 February	1	0	0	1
Day 14	21 February	0	1	0	1
Day 15	22 February	1	1	3	5
Day 16	23 February	0	0	0	0
Total		11	6	10	27

Medal	Name	Sport	Event	Date
Gold	Marit Bjørgen	Cross-country skiing	Women's 15 km skiathlon	8 February
Gold	Ole Einar Bjørndalen	Biathlon	Men's sprint	8 February
Gold	Maiken Caspersen Falla	Cross-country skiing	Women's sprint	11 February
Gold	Ola Vigen Hattestad	Cross-country skiing	Men's sprint	11 February
Gold	Kjetil Jansrud	Alpine skiing	Men's super-G	16 February
Gold	Emil Hegle Svendsen	Biathlon	Men's mass start	18 February
Gold	Jørgen Graabak	Nordic combined	Individual large hill/10 km	18 February
Gold	Marit Bjørgen; Ingvild Flugstad Østberg	Cross-country skiing	Women's team sprint	19 February
Gold	Tora Berger; Tiril Eckhoff; Ole Einar Bjørndalen; Emil Hegle Svendsen	Biathlon	Mixed relay	19 February
Gold	Jørgen Graabak; Håvard Klemetsen; Magnus Krog; Magnus Moan	Nordic combined	Team large hill/4 × 5 km	20 February
Gold	Marit Bjørgen	Cross-country skiing	Women's 30 km freestyle	22 February
Silver	Ståle Sandbech	Snowboarding	Men's slopestyle	8 February
Silver	Ingvild Flugstad Østberg	Cross-country skiing	Women's sprint	11 February
Silver	Tora Berger	Biathlon	Women's pursuit	11 February
Silver	Magnus Moan	Nordic combined	Individual large hill/10 km	18 February
Silver	Therese Johaug	Cross-country skiing	Women's 30 km freestyle	22 February
Silver	Fanny Welle-Strand Horn; Tiril Eckhoff; Ann Kristin Flatland; Tora Berger	Biathlon	Women's relay	21 February
Bronze	Heidi Weng	Cross-country skiing	Women's 15 km skiathlon	8 February
Bronze	Kjetil Jansrud	Alpine skiing	Men's downhill	9 February
Bronze	Martin Johnsrud Sundby	Cross-country skiing	Men's 30 km skiathlon	9 February
Bronze	Anders Bardal	Ski jumping	Men's normal hill individual	9 February
Bronze	Magnus Krog	Nordic combined	Individual normal hill/10 km	12 February
Bronze	Therese Johaug	Cross-country skiing	Women's 10 km classical	13 February
Bronze	Tiril Eckhoff	Biathlon	Women's mass start	17 February
Bronze	Kristin Størmer Steira	Cross-country skiing	Women's 30 km freestyle	22 February
Bronze	Henrik Kristoffersen	Alpine skiing	Men's slalom	22 February
Bronze	Ole Einar Bjørndalen; Johannes Thingnes Bø; Tarjei Bø; Emil Hegle Svendsen	Biathlon	Team relay	22 February

== Alpine skiing ==
According to the quota allocation released on 24 January 2014, Norway qualified a total quota of ten athletes in alpine skiing.

Men

Athlete	Event	Run 1		Run 2		Total	
Athlete	Event	Time	Rank	Time	Rank	Time	Rank
Leif Kristian Haugen	Giant slalom	1:23.58	=23	1:23.57	3	2:47.15	16
Leif Kristian Haugen	Slalom	48.83	23	55.38	9	1:44.21	12
Kjetil Jansrud	Downhill	—N/a				2:06.33	3rd place, bronze medalist(s)
Kjetil Jansrud	Super-G	—N/a				1:18.14	1st place, gold medalist(s)
Kjetil Jansrud	Combined	1:53.24	1	53.02	13	2:46.26	4
Kjetil Jansrud	Giant slalom	1:22.91	16	DNF			
Aleksander Aamodt Kilde	Downhill	—N/a				DNF	
Aleksander Aamodt Kilde	Super-G	—N/a				1:19.44	13
Aleksander Aamodt Kilde	Combined	1:53.85	4	DNF			
Henrik Kristoffersen	Giant slalom	1:22.71	14	1:24.08	=11	2:46.79	10
Henrik Kristoffersen	Slalom	48.49	15	54.18	3	1:42.67	3rd place, bronze medalist(s)
Sebastian Solevåg	Slalom	49.08	25	55.03	5	1:44.11	=9
Aksel Lund Svindal	Downhill	—N/a				2:06.52	4
Aksel Lund Svindal	Super-G	—N/a				1:18.76	7
Aksel Lund Svindal	Combined	1:53.94	6	52.94	12	2:46.88	=8

Women

Athlete	Event	Run 1		Run 2		Total	
Athlete	Event	Time	Rank	Time	Rank	Time	Rank
Mona Løseth	Giant slalom	1:21.50	=23	1:20.62	28	2:42.12	27
Mona Løseth	Slalom	56.82	21	52.62	=9	1:49.44	16
Nina Løseth	Giant slalom	1:20.78	18	1:19.18	13	2:39.96	17
Nina Løseth	Slalom	DNF					
Ragnhild Mowinckel	Downhill	—N/a				1:44.43	27
Ragnhild Mowinckel	Super-G	—N/a				1:28.53	19
Ragnhild Mowinckel	Combined	1:44.28	12	51.87	8	2:36.15	6
Ragnhild Mowinckel	Giant slalom	1:21.50	=23	DNF			
Lotte Sejersted	Downhill	—N/a				1:42.01	6
Lotte Sejersted	Super-G	—N/a				1:27.80	14
Lotte Sejersted	Combined	1:43.85	6	DNF			
Lotte Sejersted	Giant slalom	1:22.49	30	1:18.96	10	2:41.45	23

== Biathlon ==
Based on their performance at the 2012 and 2013 Biathlon World Championships, Norway qualified 6 men and 6 women.

Men

Athlete	Event	Time	Misses	Rank
Ole Einar Bjørndalen	Sprint	24:33.5	1 (0+1)	1st place, gold medalist(s)
Ole Einar Bjørndalen	Pursuit	34:14.5	3 (0+1+1+1)	4
Ole Einar Bjørndalen	Individual	53:21.9	4 (1+1+1+1)	34
Ole Einar Bjørndalen	Mass start	43:34.2	6 (2+0+0+4)	22
Johannes Thingnes Bø	Sprint	26:51.0	4 (2+2)	55
Johannes Thingnes Bø	Pursuit	36:12.4	1 (1+0+0+0)	32
Johannes Thingnes Bø	Individual	51:16.5	1 (0+1+0+0)	11
Johannes Thingnes Bø	Mass start	43:34.2	1 (1+0+0+0)	8
Tarjei Bø	Sprint	26:10.1	3 (0+3)	39
Tarjei Bø	Pursuit	35:50.5	2 (0+1+0+1)	27
Tarjei Bø	Individual	52:41.5	2 (0+2+0+0)	26
Emil Hegle Svendsen	Sprint	25:02.8	1 (0+1)	9
Emil Hegle Svendsen	Pursuit	34:28.8	1 (0+1+0+0)	7
Emil Hegle Svendsen	Individual	50:30.3	1 (0+0+1+0)	7
Emil Hegle Svendsen	Mass start	42:29.1	0 (0+0+0+0)	1st place, gold medalist(s)
Ole Einar Bjørndalen; Johannes Thingnes Bø; Tarjei Bø; Emil Hegle Svendsen	Team relay	1:13:10.3	6 (1+5)	3rd place, bronze medalist(s)

Women

Athlete	Event	Time	Misses	Rank
Tora Berger	Sprint	21:40.6	1 (1+0)	10
Tora Berger	Pursuit	30:08.3	1 (0+0+0+1)	2nd place, silver medalist(s)
Tora Berger	Individual	47:12.6	3 (1+2+0+0)	16
Tora Berger	Mass start	37:07.8	2 (0+1+1+0)	14
Tiril Eckhoff	Sprint	21:51.4	1 (0+1)	18
Tiril Eckhoff	Pursuit	32:12.3	6 (0+1+2+3)	24
Tiril Eckhoff	Individual	47:20.4	3 (0+1+1+1)	18
Tiril Eckhoff	Mass start	35:52.9	1 (0+1+0+0)	3rd place, bronze medalist(s)
Ann Kristin Aafedt Flatland	Sprint	22:10.6	1 (0+1)	24
Ann Kristin Aafedt Flatland	Pursuit	30:40.2	0 (0+0+0+0)	9
Ann Kristin Aafedt Flatland	Individual	51:00.0	4 (1+2+0+1)	56
Ann Kristin Aafedt Flatland	Mass start	38:15.6	2 (0+1+1+0)	24
Synnøve Solemdal	Sprint	22:32.1	2 (1+1)	35
Synnøve Solemdal	Pursuit	33:04.3	3 (1+0+0+2)	36
Elise Ringen	Individual	47:54.0	2 (0+0+0+2)	24
Tora Berger; Tiril Eckhoff; Ann Kristin Aafedt Flatland; Fanny Welle-Strand Horn	Team relay	1:10:40.1	2 (0+2)	(silver) ^{1}

^{1}The medal was reallocated after the disqualification of the Russian team for doping.

Mixed

Athlete	Event	Time	Misses	Rank
Tora Berger; Tiril Eckhoff; Ole Einar Bjørndalen; Emil Hegle Svendsen	Team relay	1:09:17.0	2 (0+2)	1st place, gold medalist(s)

== Cross-country skiing ==
Norway was awarded a total quota of twenty athletes by International Ski Federation (FIS), based on qualification points awarded in races within the FIS Calendar during the period of July 2012 – 19 January 2014. National quotas per each Olympic event were allocated according to points awarded in these competitions.

Distance
Men

Athlete	Event	Classical		Freestyle		Final		
Athlete	Event	Time	Rank	Time	Rank	Time	Deficit	Rank
Tord Asle Gjerdalen	30 km skiathlon	36:36.5	21	33:00.8	23	1:10:06.7	+1:51.3	21
Tord Asle Gjerdalen	50 km freestyle	—N/a				1:47:43.5	+48.3	21
Pål Golberg	15 km classical	—N/a				40:14.5	+1:44.8	18
Chris Jespersen	15 km classical	—N/a				39:30.6	+1:00.9	6
Chris Jespersen	50 km freestyle	—N/a				1:49:21.3	+2:26.1	32
Petter Northug	30 km skiathlon	36:06.3	15	33:02.7	25	1:09:39.6	+1:24.2	17
Petter Northug	50 km freestyle	—N/a				1:47:39.7	+44.5	18
Eldar Rønning	15 km classical	—N/a				40:02.8	+1:33.1	12
Sjur Røthe	30 km skiathlon	36:41.7	25	32:50.6	18	1:10:02.5	+1:47.1	20
Martin Johnsrud Sundby	15 km classical	—N/a				40:07.4	+1:37.7	13
Martin Johnsrud Sundby	30 km skiathlon	35:59.2	1	31:46.4	5	1:08:16.8	+1.4	3rd place, bronze medalist(s)
Martin Johnsrud Sundby	50 km freestyle	—N/a				1:46:56.2	+1.0	4
Chris Jespersen; Petter Northug; Eldar Rønning; Martin Johnsrud Sundby	4×10 km relay	—N/a				1:29:51.7	+1:09.7	4

Women

Athlete	Event	Classical		Freestyle		Final		
Athlete	Event	Time	Rank	Time	Rank	Time	Deficit	Rank
Marit Bjørgen	10 km classical	—N/a				28:51.2	+33.4	5
Marit Bjørgen	15 km skiathlon	19:10.6	1	18:47.9	1	38:33.6	+0.0	1st place, gold medalist(s)
Marit Bjørgen	30 km freestyle	—N/a				1:11:05.2	+0.0	1st place, gold medalist(s)
Astrid Uhrenholdt Jacobsen	10 km classical	—N/a				30:01.6	+1:43.8	19
Therese Johaug	10 km classical	—N/a				28:46.1	+28.3	3rd place, bronze medalist(s)
Therese Johaug	15 km skiathlon	19:11.5	2	19:01.0	3	38:48.2	+14.6	4
Therese Johaug	30 km freestyle	—N/a				1:11:07.8	+2.6	2nd place, silver medalist(s)
Kristin Størmer Steira	15 km skiathlon	19:54.2	18	20:06.5	23	40:35.5	+2:01.9	23
Kristin Størmer Steira	30 km freestyle	—N/a				1:11:28.8	+23.6	3rd place, bronze medalist(s)
Heidi Weng	10 km classical	—N/a				29:28.2	+1:10.4	9
Heidi Weng	15 km skiathlon	19:12.0	4	19:01.1	4	38:46.8	+13.2	3rd place, bronze medalist(s)
Heidi Weng	30 km freestyle	—N/a				1:13:46.1	+2:40.9	17
Marit Bjørgen; Astrid Uhrenholdt Jacobsen; Therese Johaug; Heidi Weng	4×5 km relay	—N/a				53:56.3	+53.6	5

Sprint
Men

Athlete	Event	Qualification		Quarterfinal		Semifinal		Final	
Athlete	Event	Time	Rank	Time	Rank	Time	Rank	Time	Rank
Eirik Brandsdal	Sprint	3:32.53	7 Q	3:36.59	2 Q	3:37.09	5	Did not advance	
Anders Gløersen	Sprint	3:30.41	4 Q	3:36.28	1 Q	3:36.95	3 q	4:02.05	4
Ola Vigen Hattestad	Sprint	3:28.35	1 Q	3:37.99	1 Q	3:36.33	1 Q	3:38.39	1st place, gold medalist(s)
Petter Northug	Sprint	3:35.44	16 Q	3:36.70	4 q	3:54.28	5	Did not advance	
Ola Vigen Hattestad; Petter Northug	Team sprint	—N/a				23:43.63	4 q	23:33.55	4

Women

Athlete	Event	Qualification		Quarterfinal		Semifinal		Final	
Athlete	Event	Time	Rank	Time	Rank	Time	Rank	Time	Rank
Marit Bjørgen	Sprint	2:33.17	3 Q	2:35.42	2 Q	2:52.27	6	Did not advance	
Maiken Caspersen Falla	Sprint	2:32.07	1 Q	2:33.23	1 Q	2:35.80	1 Q	2:35.49	1st place, gold medalist(s)
Astrid Uhrenholdt Jacobsen	Sprint	2:35.00	7 Q	2:37.01	1 Q	2:36.32	4 q	2:37.31	4
Ingvild Flugstad Østberg	Sprint	2:34.18	6 Q	2:36.62	1 Q	2:36.66	1 Q	2:35.87	2nd place, silver medalist(s)
Marit Bjørgen; Ingvild Flugstad Østberg	Team sprint	—N/a				16:43.45	1 Q	16:04.05	1st place, gold medalist(s)

== Curling ==
Based on their performance at the 2012 World Men's Curling Championship and the 2013 World Men's Curling Championship, Norway qualified their men's team as one of the top seven teams in the world.

Team: Thomas Ulsrud, Torger Nergård, Christoffer Svae, Håvard Vad Petersson and Markus Høiberg

Round Robin

Final round robin standings
Team	Skip	Pld	W	L	PF	PA	EW	EL	BE	SE	S%	Qualification
Sweden	Niklas Edin	9	8	1	60	44	38	30	18	8	86%	Playoffs
Canada	Brad Jacobs	9	7	2	69	53	39	36	14	7	84%	Playoffs
China	Liu Rui	9	7	2	67	50	41	37	11	5	85%	Playoffs
Norway	Thomas Ulsrud	9	5	4	52	53	36	33	18	5	86%	Tiebreaker
Great Britain	David Murdoch	9	5	4	51	49	37	35	15	8	83%	Tiebreaker
Denmark	Rasmus Stjerne	9	4	5	54	61	32	37	17	4	81%	
Russia	Andrey Drozdov	9	3	6	58	70	36	38	13	7	77%	
Switzerland	Sven Michel	9	3	6	47	46	31	34	22	7	83%	
United States	John Shuster	9	2	7	47	58	30	39	14	7	80%	
Germany	John Jahr	9	1	8	53	74	38	39	10	9	76%	

Round-robin

Draw 2

Monday, February 10, 7:00 pm

Sheet A	1	2	3	4	5	6	7	8	9	10	Final
United States (Shuster)	0	1	0	2	0	0	0	1	0	X	4
Norway (Ulsrud) 🔨	2	0	3	0	0	1	1	0	0	X	7

Draw 3

Tuesday, February 11, 2:00 pm

Sheet D	1	2	3	4	5	6	7	8	9	10	Final
Norway (Ulsrud) 🔨	2	1	0	2	0	2	0	2	0	0	9
Russia (Drozdov)	0	0	1	0	2	0	2	0	0	3	8

Draw 4

Wednesday, February 12, 9:00 am

Sheet B	1	2	3	4	5	6	7	8	9	10	Final
Norway (Ulsrud) 🔨	2	0	0	0	2	0	1	0	0	3	8
Germany (Jahr)	0	0	1	0	0	2	0	0	2	0	5

Draw 6

Thursday, February 13, 2:00 pm

Sheet C	1	2	3	4	5	6	7	8	9	10	Final
Norway (Ulsrud)	0	0	1	0	0	0	2	0	0	1	4
Sweden (Edin) 🔨	0	1	0	2	1	0	0	1	0	0	5

Draw 7

Friday, February 14, 9:00 am

Sheet D	1	2	3	4	5	6	7	8	9	10	Final
Canada (Jacobs) 🔨	0	1	0	2	0	0	4	0	3	X	10
Norway (Ulsrud)	1	0	1	0	0	1	0	1	0	X	4

Draw 8

Friday, February 14, 7:00 pm

Sheet C	1	2	3	4	5	6	7	8	9	10	Final
China (Liu) 🔨	1	0	0	2	0	2	0	1	0	1	7
Norway (Ulsrud)	0	0	2	0	1	0	1	0	1	0	5

Draw 10

Sunday, February 16, 9:00 am

Sheet B	1	2	3	4	5	6	7	8	9	10	Final
Great Britain (Murdoch) 🔨	0	2	0	1	0	0	1	0	2	0	6
Norway (Ulsrud)	0	0	2	0	2	1	0	1	0	1	7

Draw 11

Sunday, February 16, 7:00 pm

Sheet A	1	2	3	4	5	6	7	8	9	10	Final
Norway (Ulsrud) 🔨	0	1	0	1	0	1	1	0	0	1	5
Switzerland (Michel)	0	0	1	0	1	0	0	0	1	0	3

Draw 12

Monday, February 17, 2:00 pm

Sheet D	1	2	3	4	5	6	7	8	9	10	Final
Norway (Ulsrud)	0	0	2	0	0	1	0	0	0	X	3
Denmark (Stjerne) 🔨	0	1	0	2	0	0	0	0	2	X	5

== Figure skating ==
Norway earned one spot in women's figure skating during the last of the two qualifying events for the 2014 Winter Olympics, the Nebelhorn Trophy in September 2013. This was the first time Norway earned an Olympic spot in figure skating since 1994, and the first participation since 1964.

Athlete	Event	SP		FS		Total	
Athlete	Event	Points	Rank	Points	Rank	Points	Rank
Anne Line Gjersem	Ladies' singles	48.56	24 Q	85.98	22	134.54	23

== Freestyle skiing ==
Halfpipe

Athlete	Event	Qualification				Final			
Athlete	Event	Run 1	Run 2	Best	Rank	Run 1	Run 2	Best	Rank
Jon Anders Lindstad	Men's halfpipe	30.80	69.00	69.00	13	Did not advance			

Moguls

Athlete	Event	Qualification								Final											
Athlete	Event	Run 1				Run 2				Run 1				Run 2				Run 3			
Athlete	Event	Time	Points	Total	Rank	Time	Points	Total	Rank	Time	Points	Total	Rank	Time	Points	Total	Rank	Time	Points	Total	Rank
Hedvig Wessel	Women's moguls	DNF				36.47	2.74	6.21	16	Did not advance											

Ski cross

Athlete	Event	Seeding		Round of 16	Quarterfinal	Semifinal	Final	
Athlete	Event	Time	Rank	Position	Position	Position	Position	Rank
Didrik Bastian Juell	Men's ski cross	1:18.03	18	1 Q	4	Did not advance		15
Thomas Borge Lie	Men's ski cross	1:18.69	25	DNF	Did not advance			30
Christian Mithassel	Men's ski cross	1:18.40	23	DNF	Did not advance			29
Marte Høie Gjefsen	Women's ski cross	1:22.33	5	3	Did not advance			17

Qualification legend: FA – Qualify to medal round; FB – Qualify to consolation round

Slopestyle

Athlete	Event	Qualification				Final			
Athlete	Event	Run 1	Run 2	Best	Rank	Run 1	Run 2	Best	Rank
Aleksander Aurdal	Men's slopestyle	67.00	83.80	83.80	9 Q	70.00	81.80	81.80	7
Øystein Bråten	Men's slopestyle	79.20	84.20	84.20	8 Q	66.40	65.80	66.40	10
Andreas Håtveit	Men's slopestyle	88.00	87.40	88.00	2 Q	89.60	91.80	91.80	4
Per-Kristian Hunder	Men's slopestyle	15.60	75.40	75.40	17	Did not advance			

== Ice hockey ==
Norway qualified a men's team by being one of the 9 highest ranked teams in the IIHF World Ranking following the 2012 World Championships.

=== Men's tournament ===
Roster

The following is the Norwegian roster in the men's ice hockey tournament of the 2014 Winter Olympics.

No.	Pos.	Name	Height	Weight	Birthdate	Birthplace	2013–14 team
4	D	Daniel Sørvik	183 cm (6 ft 0 in)	83 kg (183 lb)	11 March 1990	Oslo	(Norway) Vålerenga Ishockey (NOR)
6	D	Jonas Holøs – A	180 cm (5 ft 11 in)	92 kg (203 lb)	27 August 1987	Sarpsborg	(Russia) Lokomotiv Yaroslavl (KHL)
8	F	Mads Hansen	185 cm (6 ft 1 in)	88 kg (194 lb)	16 September 1978	Trondheim	(Norway) Storhamar Dragons (NOR)
13	F	Sondre Olden	194 cm (6 ft 4 in)	88 kg (194 lb)	29 August 1992	Oslo	(Norway) Vålerenga Ishockey (NOR)
19	F	Per-Åge Skrøder	180 cm (5 ft 11 in)	92 kg (203 lb)	4 August 1978	Sarpsborg	(Sweden) Modo Hockey (SHL)
20	F	Anders Bastiansen – A	190 cm (6 ft 3 in)	93 kg (205 lb)	31 October 1980	Oslo	(Sweden) Färjestad BK (SHL)
21	F	Morten Ask	185 cm (6 ft 1 in)	91 kg (201 lb)	14 May 1980	Oslo	(Norway) Vålerenga Ishockey (NOR)
22	F	Martin Røymark	184 cm (6 ft 0 in)	86 kg (190 lb)	10 November 1986	Oslo	(Sweden) Färjestad BK (SHL)
23	D	Mats Trygg	179 cm (5 ft 10 in)	85 kg (187 lb)	1 June 1976	Oslo	(Norway) Lørenskog IK (NOR)
26	F	Kristian Forsberg	185 cm (6 ft 1 in)	92 kg (203 lb)	5 May 1986	Oslo	(Sweden) Modo Hockey (SHL)
28	F	Niklas Roest	174 cm (5 ft 9 in)	80 kg (180 lb)	3 August 1986	Oslo	(Sweden) BIK Karlskoga (SWE-2)
29	F	Robin Dahlstrøm	183 cm (6 ft 0 in)	94 kg (207 lb)	29 January 1988	Oslo	(Sweden) Örebro HK (SHL)
30	G	Lars Haugen	183 cm (6 ft 0 in)	83 kg (183 lb)	19 March 1987	Oslo	(Belarus) HC Dinamo Minsk (KHL)
34	G	Lars Volden	191 cm (6 ft 3 in)	91 kg (201 lb)	26 July 1992	Oslo	(Finland) Espoo Blues (FIN)
36	F	Mats Zuccarello-Aasen	171 cm (5 ft 7 in)	73 kg (161 lb)	1 September 1987	Oslo	(United States) New York Rangers (NHL)
39	D	Henrik Solberg	191 cm (6 ft 3 in)	100 kg (220 lb)	15 April 1987	Trondheim	(Norway) Stavanger Oilers (NOR)
40	F	Ken André Olimb	178 cm (5 ft 10 in)	80 kg (180 lb)	21 January 1989	Oslo	(Germany) Düsseldorfer EG (DEL)
41	F	Patrick Thoresen – A	182 cm (6 ft 0 in)	91 kg (201 lb)	7 November 1983	Hamar	(Russia) SKA Saint Petersburg (KHL)
42	D	Henrik Ødegaard	179 cm (5 ft 10 in)	85 kg (187 lb)	12 February 1988	Asker	(United States) Missouri Mavericks (CHL)
43	F	Fredrik Lystad Jacobsen	180 cm (5 ft 11 in)	86 kg (190 lb)	15 February 1990	Asker	(Norway) Storhamar Dragons (NOR)
46	F	Mathis Olimb	179 cm (5 ft 10 in)	83 kg (183 lb)	1 February 1986	Oslo	(Sweden) Frölunda HC (SHL)
47	D	Alexander Bonsaksen	180 cm (5 ft 11 in)	83 kg (183 lb)	24 January 1987	Oslo	(Norway) Vålerenga Ishockey (NOR)
51	F	Mats Rosseli Olsen	180 cm (5 ft 11 in)	83 kg (183 lb)	29 April 1991	Oslo	(Sweden) Frölunda HC (SHL)
55	D	Ole-Kristian Tollefsen – C	188 cm (6 ft 2 in)	95 kg (209 lb)	6 June 1984	Oslo	(Sweden) Färjestad BK (SHL)
70	G	Steffen Søberg	180 cm (5 ft 11 in)	80 kg (180 lb)	6 August 1993	Oslo	(Norway) Vålerenga Ishockey (NOR)

Group stage

Team	Pld	W	OTW	OTL	L	GF	GA	GD	Pts	Qualification
Canada	3	2	1	0	0	11	2	+9	8	Quarterfinals
Finland	3	2	0	1	0	15	7	+8	7	Quarterfinals
Austria	3	1	0	0	2	7	15	−8	3	
Norway	3	0	0	0	3	3	12	−9	0	

Source: IIHF

13 February 2014; 21:00	Canada	3–1 (0–0, 2–0, 1–1)	Norway	Bolshoy Ice Dome, Sochi; Attendance: 10,261

Game reference

Carey Price
Goalies
Lars Haugen
Referees:
(Canada) Mike Leggo
(Sweden) Marcus Vinnerborg
Linesmen:
(United States) Andy McElman
(United States) Chris Woodworth

S. Weber (D. Keith, P. Bergeron) – 26:20	1–0
J. Benn (P. Bergeron, D. Doughty) – 35:19	2–0
	2–1	40:22 – P. Thoresen (M. Olimb) (PP)
D. Doughty (R. Getzlaf, P. Marleau) – 41:47	3–1

10 min
Penalties
6 min
38
Shots
20

14 February 2014; 21:00	Norway	1–6 (0–3, 0–2, 1–1)	Finland	Shayba Arena, Sochi; Attendance: 3,018

Game reference

Lars Haugen (out 20:00)
Lars Volden (in 20:00)
Goalies
Kari Lehtonen
Referees:
(Germany) Lars Brüggemann
(Canada) Kelly Sutherland
Linesmen:
(Canada) Derek Amell
(Canada) Chris Carlson

	0–1	5:46 – T. Selänne (S. Vatanen, K. Lehtonen)
	0–2	6:51 – L. Korpikoski (O. Jokinen, O. Määttä)
	0–3	17:21 – J. Lehterä
	0–4	28:03 – L. Korpikoski (O. Määttä, T. Ruutu)
	0–5	31:26 – O. Jokinen (S. Salo, T. Ruutu)
P. Skrøder (M. Olimb, J. Holøs) (PP2) – 41:01	1–5
	1–6	57:41 – O. Määttä (P. Kontiola, K. Lehtonen)

6 min
Penalties
6 min
21
Shots
39

16 February 2014; 12:00	Austria	3–1 (2–0, 0–1, 1–0)	Norway	Bolshoy Ice Dome, Sochi; Attendance: 6,882

Game reference

Mathias Lange
Goalies
Lars Haugen
Referees:
(Czech Republic) Vladimír Šindler
(United States) Ian Walsh
Linesmen:
(Canada) Lonnie Cameron
(Germany) André Schrader

M. Grabner (T. Pöck, R. Lukas) – 4:27	1–0
M. Raffl (M. Grabner) (PP) – 6:52	2–0
	2–1	28:05 – P. Skrøder (P. Thoresen)
M. Grabner (D. Welser) – 58:23	3–1

12 min
Penalties
8 min
27
Shots
35

== Luge ==
Norway earned three quota places in men's singles.

Athlete	Event	Run 1		Run 2		Run 3		Run 4		Total	
Athlete	Event	Time	Rank	Time	Rank	Time	Rank	Time	Rank	Time	Rank
Jo Alexander Koppang	Men's singles	53.028	19	52.894	18	57.080	39	52.790	27	3:35.792	34
Thor Haug Norbech	Men's singles	53.014	18	52.859	15	52.345	15	52.347	16	3:30.565	17
Tønnes Stang Rolfsen	Men's singles	53.043	20	52.938	22	52.463	19	52.466	18	3:30.910	18

== Nordic combined ==
Athlete	Event	Ski jumping			Cross-country		Total	
Athlete	Event	Distance	Points	Rank	Time	Rank	Time	Rank
Jørgen Graabak	Large hill/10 km	132.0	118.4	6	22:45.5	12	23:27.5	1st place, gold medalist(s)
Håvard Klemetsen	Normal hill/10 km	99.0	122.7	9	23:53.4	14	24:18.4	10
Håvard Klemetsen	Large hill/10 km	137.5	127.0	2	23:44.0	26	23:52.0	9
Mikko Kokslien	Normal hill/10 km	93.0	107.3	35	23:19.5	5	23:56.5	13
Magnus Krog	Normal hill/10 km	97.0	115.8	20	22:55.3	2	23:58.3	3rd place, bronze medalist(s)
Magnus Krog	Large hill/10 km	125.5	106.1	18	22:32.2	7	24:02.2	12
Magnus Moan	Normal hill/10 km	99.5	119.4	15	23:14.9	4	24:02.9	5
Magnus Moan	Large hill/10 km	133.0	117.8	7	22:43.1	10	23:28.1	2nd place, silver medalist(s)
Jørgen Graabak; Håvard Klemetsen; Magnus Krog; Magnus Moan	Team large hill/4×5 km	510.5	462.8	3	46:48.5	1	47:13.5	1st place, gold medalist(s)

== Ski jumping ==
Norway received the following start quotas

Men

Athlete	Event	Qualification			First round			Final			Total	
Athlete	Event	Distance	Points	Rank	Distance	Points	Rank	Distance	Points	Rank	Points	Rank
Anders Bardal	Normal hill	BYE			101.5	135.8	2 Q	98.5	128.3	5	264.1	3rd place, bronze medalist(s)
Anders Bardal	Large hill	BYE			127.5	120.7	18 Q	127.5	125.8	11	246.5	16
Anders Fannemel	Normal hill	100.0	124.6	4 Q	98.0	123.7	20 Q	98.5	125.4	10	249.1	15
Anders Fannemel	Large hill	121.5	107.9	15 Q	132.0	129.5	7 Q	132.0	134.8	5	264.3	5
Anders Jacobsen	Normal hill	95.0	115.9	12 Q	97.5	119.3	28 Q	93.5	115.0	16	234.3	27
Anders Jacobsen	Large hill	119.5	103.0	25 Q	122.5	107.6	38	Did not advance				
Rune Velta	Normal hill	95.5	115.1	15 Q	97.5	122.8	23 Q	96.5	118.6	21	241.4	22
Rune Velta	Large hill	123.0	106.4	17 Q	126.5	121.9	17 Q	123.5	116.8	26	238.7	24
Anders Bardal; Anders Fannemel; Anders Jacobsen; Daniel-André Tande*; Rune Velta	Team large hill	—N/a			511	486	6 Q	522	504.7	6	990.7	6

Women

Athlete	Event	First round			Final			Total	
Athlete	Event	Distance	Points	Rank	Distance	Points	Rank	Points	Rank
Gyda Enger	Normal hill	93.0	105.8	23	91.5	103.9	25	209.7	24
Line Jahr	Normal hill	97.5	117.7	9	98.5	116.9	11	234.6	9
Maren Lundby	Normal hill	97.0	115.5	13	100.0	120.0	6	235.5	8
Helena Olsson Smeby	Normal hill	98.5	115.0	15	98.0	113.3	13	228.3	14

== Snowboarding ==
Torstein Horgmo qualified for the men's slopestyle, and was considered to be one of the medal contenders, however, while practicing in Sochi, he fell and broke a clavicle, which forced him to miss the Olympics.

Alpine

Athlete	Event	Qualification		Round of 16	Quarterfinal	Semifinal	Final	
Athlete	Event	Time	Rank	Opposition Time	Opposition Time	Opposition Time	Opposition Time	Rank
Hilde-Katrine Engeli	Women's giant slalom	1:52.29	19	Did not advance				
Hilde-Katrine Engeli	Women's slalom	1:06.29	28	Did not advance				

Freestyle

Athlete	Event	Qualification				Semifinal				Final			
Athlete	Event	Run 1	Run 2	Best	Rank	Run 1	Run 2	Best	Rank	Run 1	Run 2	Best	Rank
Gjermund Bråten	Men's slopestyle	12.75	91.25	91.25	4 QF	BYE				24.75	20.50	24.75	12
Ståle Sandbech	Men's slopestyle	45.25	94.50	94.50	1 QF	BYE				27.00	91.75	91.75	2nd place, silver medalist(s)
Emil André Ulsletten	Men's slopestyle	27.25	79.75	79.75	8 QS	22.50	56.75	56.75	13	Did not advance			
Torgeir Bergrem	Men's slopestyle	25.00	24.75	25.00	15 QS	37.50	26.75	37.50	16	Did not advance			
Kjersti Buaas	Women's slopestyle	12.50	17.75	17.75	12 QS	DNS				Did not advance			
Silje Norendal	Women's slopestyle	31.00	39.00	39.00	8 QS	16.75	78.75	78.75	4 Q	49.50	32.00	49.50	11

Qualification Legend: QF – Qualify directly to final; QS – Qualify to semifinal

Snowboard cross

Athlete	Event	Seeding		Round of 16	Quarterfinal	Semifinal	Final	
Athlete	Event	Time	Rank	Position	Position	Position	Position	Rank
Stian Sivertzen	Men's snowboard cross	CAN		3 Q	3 Q	2 FA	5	5
Helene Olafsen	Women's snowboard cross	DNF	23	—N/a	DNS	Did not advance		=23

Qualification legend: FA – Qualify to medal round; FB – Qualify to consolation round

== Speed skating ==
Based on the results from the fall World Cups during the 2013–14 ISU Speed Skating World Cup season, Norway earned the following start quotas:

Men

Athlete	Event	Race 1		Race 2		Final	
Athlete	Event	Time	Rank	Time	Rank	Time	Rank
Håvard Bøkko	1000 m	—N/a				1:09.98	19
Håvard Bøkko	1500 m	—N/a				1:45.48	6
Håvard Bøkko	5000 m	—N/a				6:22.83	9
Espen Hvammen	500 m	35.20	16	35.21	13	70.42	12
Espen Hvammen	1000 m	—N/a				1:11.01	31
Håvard Holmefjord Lorentzen	500 m	35.78	37	35.52	26	71.30	32
Håvard Holmefjord Lorentzen	1000 m	—N/a				1:09.33	11
Håvard Holmefjord Lorentzen	1500 m	—N/a				1:47.27	16
Sverre Lunde Pedersen	1500 m	—N/a				1:45.66	8
Sverre Lunde Pedersen	5000 m	—N/a				6:18.84	5
Simen Spieler Nilsen	1500 m	—N/a				1:49.88	36
Simen Spieler Nilsen	5000 m	—N/a				6:42.47	25

Women

Athlete	Event	Final	
Athlete	Event	Time	Rank
Hege Bøkko	1500 m	2:02.53	33
Mari Hemmer	3000 m	4:12.21	14
Mari Hemmer	5000 m	7:04.45	7
Ida Njåtun	1000 m	1:17.15	17
Ida Njåtun	1500 m	1:58.21	12
Ida Njåtun	3000 m	4:06.73	6

Team pursuit

Athlete	Event	Quarterfinal	Semifinal	Final	
Athlete	Event	Opposition Time	Opposition Time	Opposition Time	Rank
Håvard Bøkko; Håvard Holmefjord Lorentzen; Sverre Lunde Pedersen; Simen Spieler Nilsen	Men's team pursuit	Poland; L 3:43.19	Did not advance	Final C Russia; W 3:44.91	5
Hege Bøkko; Camilla Farestveit; Mari Hemmer; Ida Njåtun	Women's team pursuit	Poland; L 3:05.13	Did not advance	Final D South Korea; W 3:08.35	7
