= Adrian Krainer =

Adrian Krainer may refer to:

- Adrian Krainer (snowboarder)
- Adrian Krainer (scientist)
