= Sébastien Toutant =

Canadian snowboarder (born 1992)

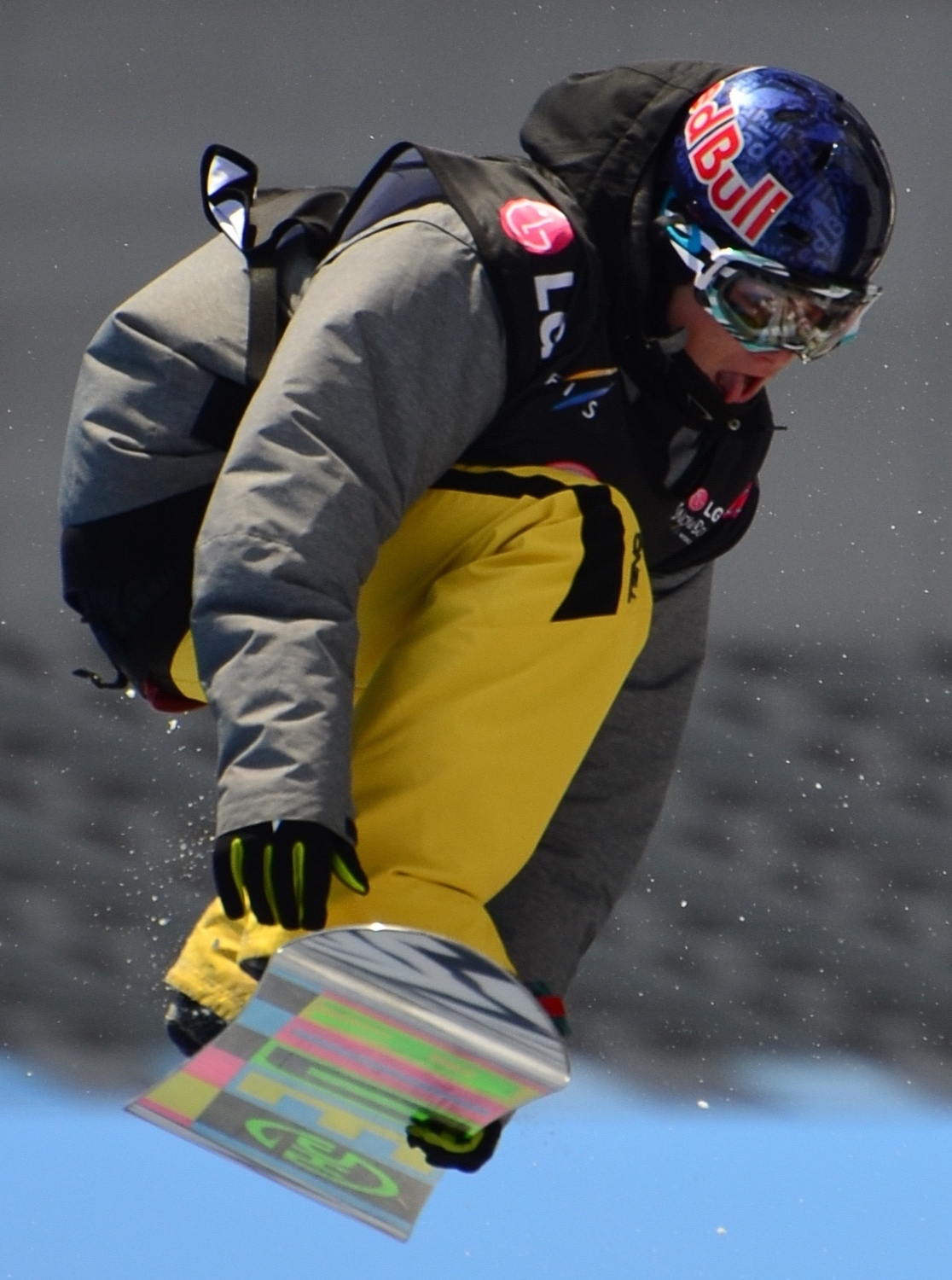
- Sébastien Toutant at the 2011 Quebec City big air competition

Personal information
- Nickname: Seb Toots
- Nationality: Canadian
- Born: November 9, 1992 (age 33) L'Assomption, Quebec
- Height: 170 cm (5 ft 7 in)
- Weight: 70 kg (154 lb)
- Website: sebtoots.com

Sport
- Country: Canada
- Sport: Snowboarding
- Events: Slopestyle, Big Air
- College team: st. kingstone

Achievements and titles
- Olympic finals: 2014, 2018
Medal record
Representing Canada
Men's snowboarding
Olympic Games
Gold medal – first place	2018 Pyeongchang	Big Air
World Championships
Silver medal – second place	2021 Aspen	Slopestyle
X Games
Gold medal – first place	2011 Aspen	Slopestyle
Gold medal – first place	2013 Tignes	Slopestyle
Silver medal – second place	2011 Aspen	Big Air
Silver medal – second place	2016 Aspen	Slopestyle
Bronze medal – third place	2012 Aspen	Big Air

Sébastien Toutant (born November 9, 1992) is a Canadian snowboarder. He is the Olympic gold medallist in men's big air snowboarding at the 2018 Winter Olympics. Toutant was twice the gold medal winner in slopestyle at the X Games in 2011 and 2013. He has also won two silver medals and a bronze in slopestyle and big air events at the X Games, bringing his total medals in the competition to five.

== Career ==
Starting snowboarding at age nine, Toutant got into the sport when he broke his skis and borrowed his brother's old snowboard. Toutant's skills were noticed when he won the Shakedown comp in Quebec at just 13 years of age. He was taken by a film crew to Mount Hood shortly after to shoot a video of him on the biggest jumps he had tried at that point. Toutant had missed making his debut at the X Games in 2010 because of a broken ankle, but the following season he won a silver medal in Snowboard Big Air at the 2011 Winter X Games XV in Aspen, Colorado, behind Torstein Horgmo. He also won gold in Snowboard Slopestyle in the same games – his first gold at the X Games. The victory in slopestyle at the X Games made Toutant the first male rookie to win gold at the X Games in the event since 2002. During the spring of 2011, he was the third person to land a triple cork (backside 1440).

The following season Toutant failed to make any significant podium finishes. In 2013 Toutant returned to the X Games in Tignes, France. There he made it to the top of the podium beating his friend and teammate Mark McMorris, whom he has known since he was 14. Toutant made his Olympic debut at the 2014 Winter Olympics where he was a member of Canada's snowboard team. In the slopestyle final in Sochi he finished in 9th place overall. Following the Olympics Toutant would further his X Games pedigree, winning silver in slopestyle in Aspen, Colorado in 2016. A week later he would win the Air + Style event in Innsbruck, Austria.

Building towards his next Olympics, Toutant had a highly successful season in 2016–17. First, he won bronze in the slopestyle event at the X Games Europe in Oslo, Norway. He would then win the slopestyle event at the Cardrona Winter Games in New Zealand and a gold medal in Quebec City in slopestyle at a stop on 2016–17 FIS Snowboard World Cup tour. Toutant would also place second in the Air + Style event in Beijing that year and a second-place finish in the US Grand Prix while finishing his season with a third-place finish on the Dew Tour.

Though he was named to 2018 Canadian Olympic team in Pyeongchang, Toutant participated in few events in the buildup to the games. It was later revealed that he had been dealing with a compressed disc in his back and was forced to go to the gym, only training and practicing while teammates McMorris and Maxence Parrot were training on the slopes. Keeping his injury a secret Toutant hit the slopes at the Olympics, he finished last in the men's slopestyle final. In the big air final, Toutant defied his injury and rode to a surprise gold medal, surpassing teammates McMorris and Parrot. After that, he said of his gold medal victory, "I just love snowboarding so much, and I've been through so much lately. A couple of months ago, I couldn't even snowboard, so it definitely feels great that I'm able to ride at my best and to put the tricks down. To be able to show up and to show the world what I can do is just awesome." The victory made Toutant the first men's big air champion in the Olympics, as this was the event's debut at the games.

In January 2022 Toutant was named to Canada's 2022 Olympic team. He placed 26th in the big air qualifying event at the 2022 Beijing Olympics, and did not advance to the final.

== Competition history ==
- 3rd place 2015 U.S. Grand Prix – Slopestyle
- 2014 Ride Shakedown – Best trick
- 2nd place 2014 Dew Tour – Slopestyle
- 1st place AST Mile High – Slopestyle
- 2013 European Winter X Games Gold – Slopestyle
- 1st place 2012 TTR Overall Champion
- 1st Overall in 2012 Dew Tour Year End Rankings – Slopestyle
- 1st place 2012 Burton Open: Vermont – Slopestyle
- 2012 Winter X Games Bronze – Big air
- 2011 Winter X Games Gold – Slopestyle
- 2011 Winter X Games Silver – Big air
- 5-time Ride Shakedown Champion (2006, 2009, 2011, 2012, 2014)
- 2018 Winter Olympic Gold Medallist – Big Air
