= Torgeir Bergrem =

Norwegian snowboarder (born 1991)

Personal information
- Full name: Torgeir Herje Bergrem
- Born: 20 September 1991 (age 34) Trondheim or Harstad, Norway
- Height: 178 cm (5 ft 10 in)
- Weight: 73 kg (161 lb)

Torgeir Herje Bergrem (born 20 September 1991 in Trondheim or Harstad) is a Norwegian snowboarder.

== Biography ==
Bergrem competed in slopestyle event at the 2014 Winter Olympics in Sochi and also in the slopestyle event at the 2018 Winter Olympics.

He won a bronze medal in big air at the X games in Hafjell in March 2017, behind winner Mark McMorris and Max Parrot.
