= Charles Reid (snowboarder) =

Canadian snowboarder (born 1990)

Personal information
- Nationality: Canadian
- Born: 12 April 1990 (age 35) Mont-Tremblant, Quebec
- Height: 1.75 m (5 ft 9 in)
- Weight: 68 kg (150 lb)

Sport
- Country: Canada
- Sport: Snowboarding

Charles Reid (born April 12, 1990) is a Canadian snowboarder. He competes in slopestyle and represented Canada in this event at the 2014 Winter Olympics in Sochi where he finished in 22nd place in the Olympic inaugural slopestyle event.
