= Kyle Mack =

American snowboarder (born 1997)

Personal information
- Full name: Kyle Alan Mack
- Born: July 6, 1997 (age 29) Royal Oak, Michigan, U.S.
- Height: 5 ft 10 in (178 cm)
- Weight: 170 lb (77 kg)

Sport
- Country: United States
- Sport: Snowboarding, Skateboarding, Wakeboarding, Golf, Wakeskating
Medal record
Men's snowboarding
Representing United States
Olympic Games
| Silver medal – second place | 2018 Pyeongchang | Big Air |
World Championships
| Bronze medal – third place | 2015 Kreischberg | Big Air |
| Bronze medal – third place | 2015 Kreischberg | Slopestyle |
Other
| Gold medal – first place | 2016 Burton Snowboards US Open | Slopestyle |
| Silver medal – second place | 2016 Air & Style | Big Air |
| Silver medal – second place | 2015 The Shred Show | Slopestyle |
| Gold medal – first place | 2014 The Shred Show | Slopestyle |
| Silver medal – second place | 2014 Sprint U.S. Grand Prix | Slopestyle |
| Silver medal – second place | 2014 Vienna Fridge | Big Air |
| Silver medal – second place | 2014 The Shred Show | Halfpipe |
| Bronze medal – third place | 2013 World Snowboard Tour |
| Silver medal – second place | 2013 O'Neill Evolution | Halfpipe |
| Silver medal – second place | 2013 O'Neill Evolution | Big Air |
| Gold medal – first place | 2013 Paul Mitchell Progression Session | Big Air |
| Gold medal – first place | 2012 Burton Euro Junior Jam | Halfpipe |
| Bronze medal – third place | 2012 Burton Euro Junior Jam | Slopestyle |

Kyle Alan Mack (born July 6, 1997) is an American snowboarder from West Bloomfield, Michigan, who specializes both Slopestyle and Big Air. On March 4, 2016, he won the US Open Men's Slopestyle final.

At the 2018 Pyeongchang Winter Olympics, he won the silver medal in the Men's Big Air final.

== Career ==
Mack was born in Royal Oak, Michigan but lists his hometown as West Bloomfield. Mack's career began at the age of three, as he would ride down the driveway after every snowfall. His parents attempted to make it tradition to go skiing every weekend, but Mack had an aversion to the skis, stating "I hated skiing. I didn't like it. I took a couple hard crashes. Apparently, I threw a bunch of tantrums and never wanted to get on skis," prompting his father to put him on a snowboard. At five, he began regularly riding Alpine Valley; he would never leave regardless of the weather conditions. His dedication caused Burton Snowboards to notice him at the age of seven, resulting in sponsorship. In 2010, he placed first in the Burton Open Junior Jam which skyrocketed him to new heights.

He attended Brother Rice High School in Birmingham, Michigan, but missed too many days of school traveling for competitions that he transferred to Pontiac High School where he took online classes and graduated.

In 2011, he was invited to join the US Snowboarding Team. He has competed in several countries' Open competitions, multiple Dew Tours, and many Grand Prix. He won a bronze medal in both big air and Slopestyle at the FIS Freestyle Ski and Snowboarding World Championships 2015, behind Roope Tonteri and Darcy Sharpe. In 2016, he placed second at the Los Angeles stop of the Air & Style tour. On March 4, 2016, he placed first at the US Open in Men's Slopestyle.

At the 2018 Pyeongchang Winter Olympics, he won the silver medal in the Men's Big Air final.
