= Alex Deibold =

American snowboarder (born 1986)

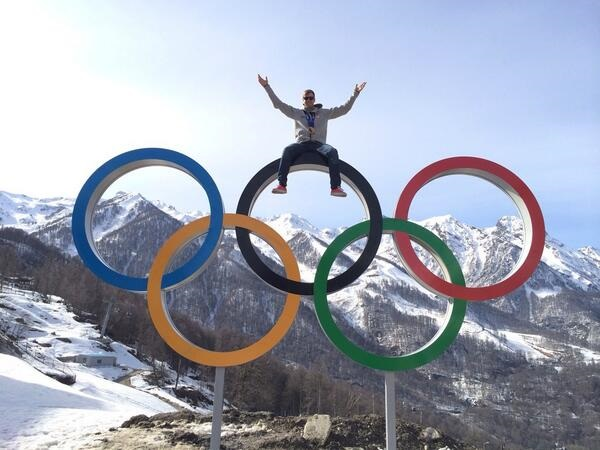
- Deibold, bronze medalist Sochi Winter Olympic Games 2014

Personal information
- Full name: Alexander Deibold
- Born: May 8, 1986 (age 40) Branford, Connecticut, U.S.
- Height: 6 ft 1 in (185 cm)
- Weight: 190 lb (86 kg)
Medal record
Men's snowboarding
Representing the United States
Olympic Games
Bronze medal – third place	2014 Sochi	Snowboard cross

Alexander "Alex" Deibold (born May 8, 1986) is an American snowboarder from Manchester, Vermont. Deibold won a bronze medal in snowboard cross at the 2014 Winter Olympics in Sochi, Russia.

Deibold who started snowboarding at the age of four, was a backup and wax technician at the 2010 Winter Olympic Games in Vancouver. Deibold graduated from the Stratton Mountain School, Vermont in 2004. He attended with fellow Olympians Lindsey Jacobellis, Louie Vito, and Danny Davis.
