= Gjermund Bråten =

Norwegian snowboarder (born 1990)

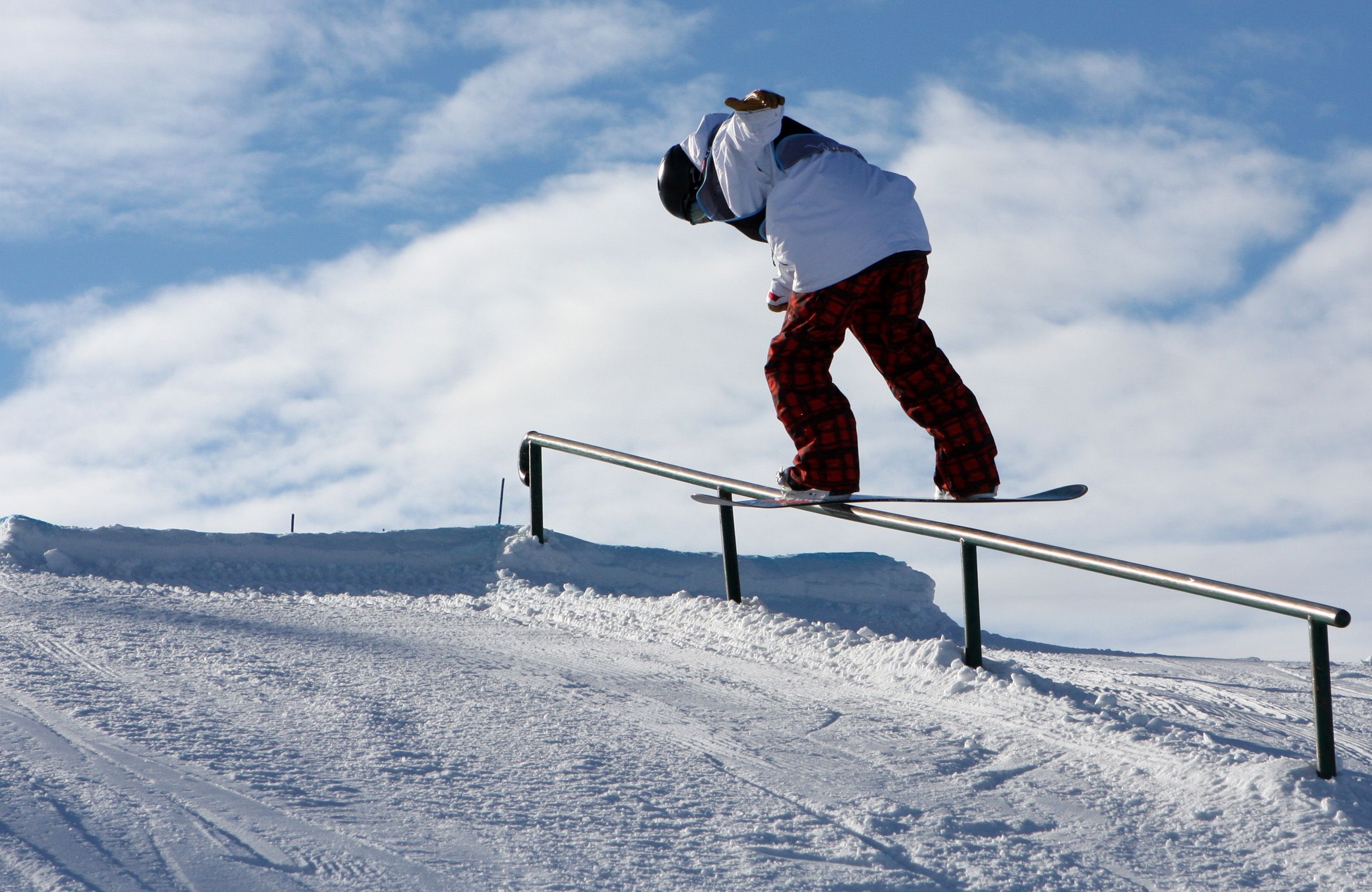

Personal information
- Born: 23 October 1990 (age 35) Drammen
- Height: 5 ft 8 in (173 cm)
- Weight: 154 lb (70 kg)

Sport
- Country: Norway
- Sport: Snowboarding

Gjermund Bråten (born 23 October 1990, in Drammen) is a Norwegian snowboarder who competes in slopestyle and big air.

Bråten qualified for the 2014 Winter Olympics in Sochi, Russia. On February 6, 2014 in the qualification event Bråten finished the fourth in his heat and thereby qualified directly to the final. In the final, he was ranked twelfth.

His best World Cup result in slopestyle before the 2014 Olympics was the seventh-place finish in Sierra Nevada on March 26, 2013. Before 2011, Bråten also achieved three World Cup podium finishes (one second place and two third places) in big air.

His brother Øystein Bråten represented Norway at the 2014 Winter Olympics in freestyle skiing, also in slopestyle.
