= Emil André Ulsletten =

Norwegian snowboarder (born 1993)

Personal information
- Nationality: Norwegian
- Born: 16 May 1993 (age 31); Lillehammer, Norway

Sport
- Sport: Snowboarding

Emil André Ulsletten (born 16 May 1993) is a Norwegian snowboarder. He was born in Lillehammer. He competed in slopestyle at the 2014 Winter Olympics in Sochi.
