= Michael Ciccarelli =

Canadian snowboarder (born 1996)

Michael Ciccarelli (born September 4, 1996) is a Canadian snowboarder. He hails from Ancaster, Ontario and is a member of the Canadian National Slopestyle/Big Air Team. Coming from a family of skiers, Mikey has been snowboarding since the age of six, when his parents finally relented to his begging and bought him a board. Mikey grew up on the slopes of the Georgian Peaks Ski Club in Thornbury Ontario. Mikey's career was catapulted in 2012 when he won the gold medal for slopestyle at the Winter Youth Olympics in Innsbruck, Austria. His pro resume highlights consist of a win at the 2015 Stoneham World Cup, a 2nd-place finish at the 2017 Burton US Open, a 2nd-place finish at the 2016 Fenway Park U.S. Grand Prix/World Cup Big Air, a 3rd-place finish at the 2015 Cardona World Cup, and a 4th-place finish at the 2017 Air & Style in Innsbruck. Mikey rides in the memory of his father, who he lost to cancer in October 2014.

At the 2015–16 FIS Snowboard World Cup, Ciccarelli won the slopestyle title with a winning score of 95.50 at the tour opener in Stoneham, Quebec. "It's been a long time coming," Ciccarelli said afterwards. "I've been working pretty hard to get tricks down. It felt good to go clean through the whole course today. After the first run I knew there was still room for some improvement."

At the Burton U.S. Open 2017, Ciccarelli finished second to fellow Canadian Mark McMorris while Sven Thorgren of Sweden was third. It was the first U.S. Open podium finish for Ciccarelli. "It's crazy, I can't believe it. To put that [cab triple cork 1620 melon] down in my run, it all came together," Ciccarelli said in a release from Snowboard Canada. "I didn't even really feel too much pressure, I just wanted to put a run down and I'm just so stoked."
