= Peetu Piiroinen =

Finnish snowboarder

Personal information
- Born: 15 February 1988 (age 38) Hyvinkää, Finland
- Height: 5 ft 5 in (165 cm)
- Weight: 148 lb (67 kg)

Sport
- Country: Finland
- Sport: Snowboarding
- Events: Slopestyle, Halfpipe

Achievements and titles
- Olympic finals: 2010 (2nd), 2014, 2018
Medal record
Men's snowboarding
Representing Finland
Olympic Games
Silver medal – second place	2010 Vancouver	Halfpipe
Winter X Games
Bronze medal – third place	2012 Aspen	Slopestyle

Peetu (born 15 February 1988) is a Finnish snowboarder. He is a three-time Olympian representing Finland in snowboarding at the 2010 Winter Olympics, 2014 Winter Olympics and 2018 Winter Olympics. Peetu made the finals in all 3 Olympics and won the silver medal at the 2010 Games.

== Personal life ==
Living in Hyvinkää, Finland, with his home mountain being Sveitsin Hiihtokeskus, Peetu has been travelling the world competing since 1997.

He consistently competes in the TTR World Tour . He finished 2nd in the Winter Olympics halfpipe event in 2010. He has so far now won three TTR World Tours in a row. He is the first one to do this.

He is the older brother of fellow snowboarder Petja Piiroinen.

== Career ==
He won the 2008/2009 Swatch TTR World Snowboard Championship and received much favourable press in his native country of Finland. In 2009/10, Peetu Piiroinen became the first snowboarder ever to win two consecutive Swatch TTR World Champion titles. He also secured it a week before the last 6Star event, the Burton US Open. Piiroinen took the lead in the TTR World Ranking List with a win in the slopestyle at the 6Star Oakley Arctic Challenge in Oslo, Norway, on March 8, 2010. Along with the title, the 22-year-old Finn earned himself another TTR prize money worth US$50,000 and automatic invites to all major TTR events for the 2010/2011 season. In the 2010 season, Peetu balanced his TTR commitments with events outside the TTR tour winning an Olympic silver medal and the title at the Toyota Big Air in Japan.

In the 2007/2008 Swatch TTR World Snowboard Tour, Piiroinen finished ranked World No.3. He finished 2nd in the Winter Olympics halfpipe event in 2010. Piiroinen has a sponsorship deal with Nike 6.0. His other sponsors include Burton, Red, Anon, Battery and 015 Boards and Lifestyle.
