= Jamie Nicholls (snowboarder) =

British snowboarder

Personal information
- Born: 21 July 1993 (age 33) Bradford, England
- Height: 5 ft 10 in (178 cm)
- Weight: 148 lb (67 kg)

Sport
- Country: Great Britain
- Sport: Snowboarding

Achievements and titles
- Olympic finals: 2014

Jamie Nicholls (born 21 July 1993) is a British snowboarder who competes in slopestyle.

Nicholls was born in Bradford. He qualified for the 2014 Winter Olympics in Sochi, Russia. On 6 February 2014 in the men's slopestyle qualification event, he placed fourth in his heat and progressed directly to the final. Two days later, he finished sixth in the final.

Nicholls became the first British male snowboarder to win a World Cup event when he finished top of the standings in the final slopestyle event of the 2015-16 season, the Audi Snowjam in Spindleruv Mlyn in the Czech Republic, helping him to fifth in the slopestyle World Cup ranking for the season. During the 2016-17 season, he finished on the podium at two events and was runner-up in overall ranking.

He has won three medals at FIS World Cup.

== Competitive history ==
2014 Winter Olympics

Event	Qualification				Semifinal				Final			
Event	Run 1	Run 2	Best	Rank	Run 1	Run 2	Best	Rank	Run 1	Run 2	Best	Rank
Men's slopestyle	62.25	86.75	86.75	4 QF	Bye				85.50	46.50	85.50	6th

International Results

Year	Event	Discipline	Finish
2010	Burton New Zealand Open, Cardrona Alpine Resort	Slopestyle	10
2010	FIS World Cup Big Air, London	Big Air	7
2011	Burn River Jump, Livigno	Big Air	4
2011	Burn River Jump, Livigno	Slopestyle	3
2011	Burton US Open, Stratton Mountain, Vermont	Slopestyle	4
2011	Relentless Big Air, Stuttgart	Big Air	7
2012	The Brits, LAAX	Slopestyle	1
2013	World Snowboard Championships, Stoneham, Quebec	Slopestyle	14
2013	World Cup, Spindleruv Mlyn	Slopestyle	15
2013	World Cup, Copper Mountain, Colorado	Slopestyle	17
2014	World Cup, Stoneham, Quebec	Slopestyle	6
2016	World Cup, Peyonchang	Slopestyle	12
2016	TTR Spring Battle, Austria	Slopestyle	4
2016	World Cup, Spindleruv Mlyn	Slopestyle	1

== Personal life ==
He is the cousin of snowboarder Katie Ormerod.
