= Darcy Sharpe =

Canadian snowboarder (born 1996)

Personal information
- Nationality: Canadian
- Born: February 9, 1996 (age 30) Calgary, Alberta

Sport
- Country: Canada
- Sport: Snowboarding
Medal record
Men's snowboarding
Representing Canada
World Championships
Silver medal – second place	2015 Kreischberg	Big air
Winter X Games
Gold medal – first place	2020 Aspen	Slopestyle
Silver medal – second place	2018 Aspen	Slopestyle
Silver medal – second place	2020 Aspen	Rail Jam
Silver medal – second place	2020 Norway	Big air

Darcy Sharpe (born 9 February 1996 in Calgary, Alberta) is a Canadian snowboarder. He is the brother of Douglas Sharpe and Cassie Sharpe.

He won a silver medal in men's big air at the FIS Freestyle Ski and Snowboarding World Championships 2015. He won a gold medal in slopestyle at the 2020 Aspen X Games.

In January 2022, Sharpe was named to Canada's 2022 Olympic team.
