= Mark McMorris =

Canadian snowboarder (born 1993)

Mark Lee McMorris
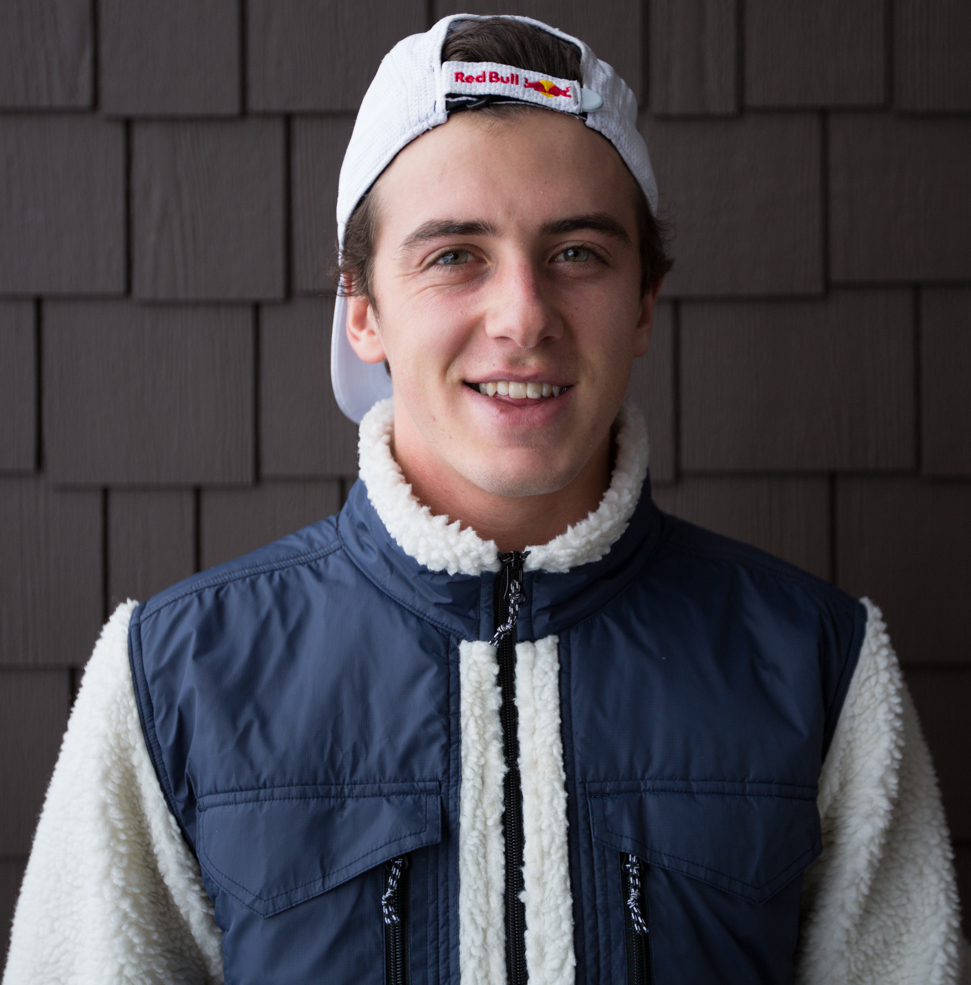
- McMorris in 2016

Personal information
- Full name: Mark Lee McMorris
- Nicknames: Sparky, McLovin', McRib The Closer
- Born: December 9, 1993 (age 32) Regina, Saskatchewan, Canada
- Agent: Framework
- Height: 1.80 m (5 ft 11 in)
- Weight: 72 kg (159 lb)
- Website: www.markmcmorris.com

Sport
- Country: Canada
- Sport: Snowboarding
- Events: Big Air; Slopestyle
- Turned pro: 2010
Medal record
Olympic Games
Bronze medal – third place	2014 Sochi	Slopestyle
Bronze medal – third place	2018 Pyeongchang	Slopestyle
Bronze medal – third place	2022 Beijing	Slopestyle
World Championships
Gold medal – first place	2021 Aspen	Big air
Silver medal – second place	2013 Stoneham	Slopestyle
Silver medal – second place	2019 Utah	Slopestyle
Winter X Games
Gold medal – first place	2012 Aspen	Big air
Gold medal – first place	2012 Aspen	Slopestyle
Gold medal – first place	2013 Aspen	Slopestyle
Gold medal – first place	2015 Aspen	Slopestyle
Gold medal – first place	2015 Aspen	Big air
Gold medal – first place	2016 Aspen	Slopestyle
Gold medal – first place	2017 Norway	Big air
Gold medal – first place	2019 Aspen	Slopestyle
Gold medal – first place	2020 Hafjell	Big air
Gold medal – first place	2022 Aspen	Slopestyle
Gold medal – first place	2023 Aspen	Slopestyle
Gold medal – first place	2026 Aspen	Slopestyle
Silver medal – second place	2011 Aspen	Slopestyle
Silver medal – second place	2013 Aspen	Big air
Silver medal – second place	2013 Tignes	Slopestyle
Silver medal – second place	2014 Aspen	Slopestyle
Silver medal – second place	2016 Aspen	Big air
Silver medal – second place	2019 Aspen	Big air
Silver medal – second place	2020 Aspen	Big air
Silver medal – second place	2020 Hafjell	Slopestyle
Silver medal – second place	2024 Aspen	Slopestyle
Silver medal – second place	2025 Aspen	Slopestyle
Bronze medal – third place	2017 Aspen	Big air
Bronze medal – third place	2017 Aspen	Slopestyle
Bronze medal – third place	2018 Aspen	Slopestyle

Mark Lee McMorris (born December 9, 1993) is a Canadian professional snowboarder who specializes in slopestyle and big air events. A three-time Olympic bronze medallist, he placed third in each of the 2014 Winter Olympics, 2018 Winter Olympics, and 2022 Winter Olympics in the slopestyle event. While filming for Transworld Snowboarding's "Park Sessions" video in March 2011, Mark became the first person to land a Backside Triple Cork 1440. More recently, on April 28, 2018, Mark landed the world's first Double Cork off a rail, the Front-Board Double Cork 1170, with a melancholy grab. Mark McMorris has won a record-setting 25 X Games medals, In 2012 and 2013, Mark won back-to-back gold medals in Winter X Games in the slopestyle event. In 2023 he defended his Winter X Games gold medal in the men's slopestyle to set a record for the most Winter X Games medals with 22.

He has also appeared in many videos for Transworld Snowboarding, Burton, Red Bull, CBC, SUBWAY, and Shredbots.

== Career ==
=== Early career ===
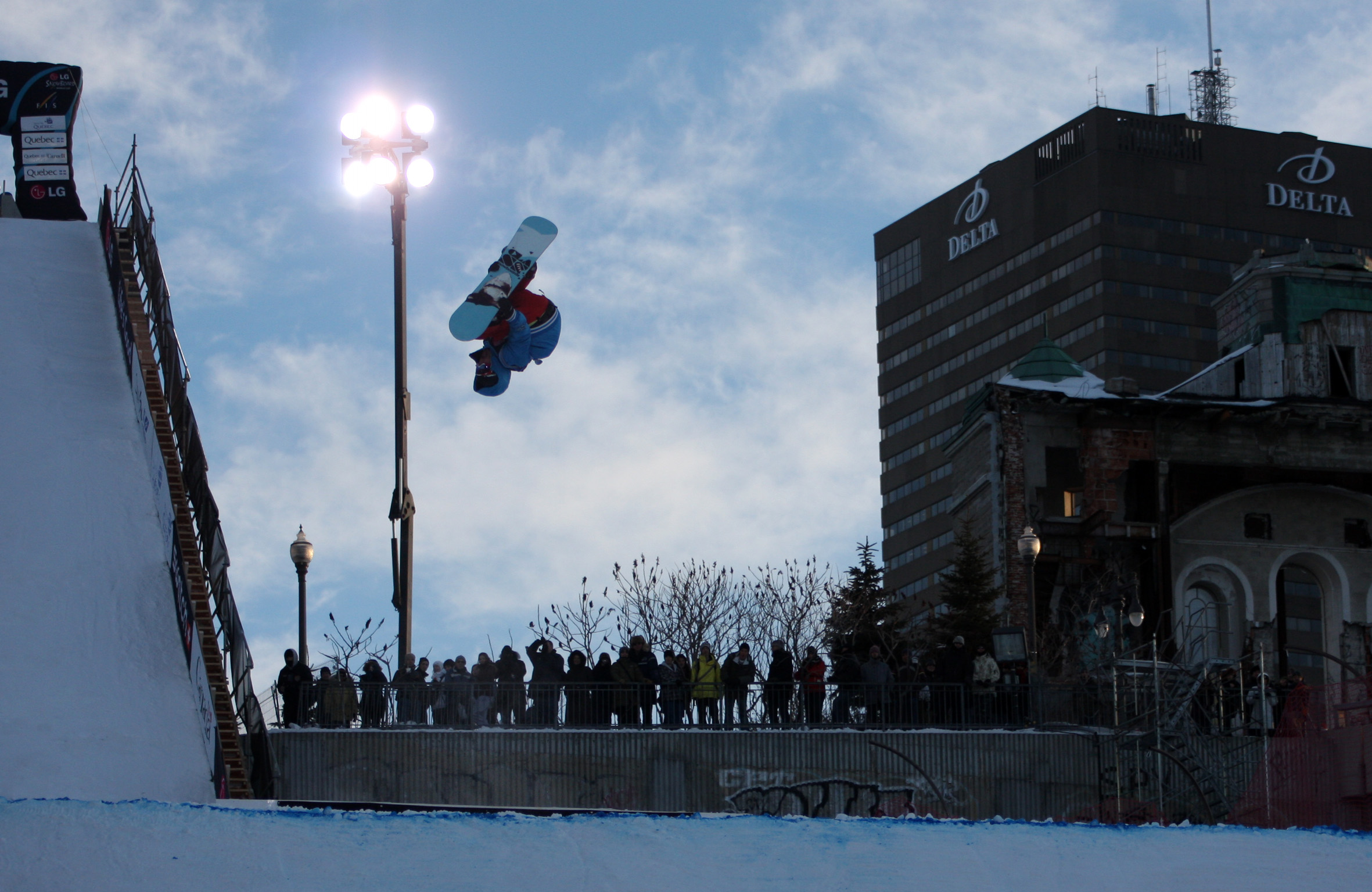
McMorris at a FIS World Cup event in Quebec City.

McMorris competed at his first FIS Snowboard World Cup during the 2009–2010 season, placing eighth in the big air event in Quebec City. He followed up with a World Cup victory in slopestyle in Calgary. At the Winter X Games XV in Aspen, Colorado, he won a silver medal in the slopestyle competition finishing behind fellow Canadian Sebastien Toutant. He won gold at the 2011 World Snowboard Tour's Air & Style competition beating out Peetu Piiroinen, Werner Stock, and Nils Arvidsson in the final. In 2012, McMorris won double gold at Winter X Games XVI. McMorris won gold in the big air event and the Slopestyle event. It was the first double gold at Winter X Games since Shaun White had in 2009.

=== 2014 X-Games & Olympics ===
Mark McMorris has won a record-setting 22 X Games medals, four US Open Championships, and three Olympic medals.

In the 2014 Winter X Games, McMorris placed 2nd behind fellow Canadian Max Parrot in the Slopestyle event. McMorris' hopes of a 3rd consecutive gold medal were dashed when he tripped on the rails, crashed, and fractured a rib during the 3rd and final run of the event. Despite the injury, McMorris still competed in the Winter Olympics in Sochi. As McMorris arrived in Sochi, he said he felt remarkably good, stating, "The amount of progress I've made since I broke my rib on Saturday has been unexplainable. I didn't believe I could be on this path, going this fast. At the same time, walking around an airport is different than going snowboarding and taking impact."

At the Olympics, McMorris fell on his first qualifying run and failed to make it through directly to the final with his score on his second run. In the semi-finals, he put up one of the top four scores to qualify for the final. There, he again fell on his first attempt. McMorris' second run was good enough to put him on the podium and win bronze. It was a tough couple of weeks for McMorris with his injury and a flood of different emotions. He said that "To get on the podium is just a dream come true. I can't explain this. I've just been through a roller coaster over these last few weeks."

=== Injuries ===
In February 2016, McMorris broke his right femur at Shaun White's Air + Style Big Air in Los Angeles. He attempted to do a frontside triple cork 1440, but in his landing, his toe edge was caught, which caused him to flip and break his femur. He had a long recovery, starting at Fortius Sport & Health in Vancouver. He was back snowboarding in July 2016 in Australia with some friends. A series of four episodes following his recovery was produced by X Games and aired in October 2016.

=== 2018 Winter Olympics ===
In late March 2017, while boarding in the backcountry in Whistler, British Columbia with some friends, McMorris hit a tree and suffered near-fatal injuries that required being airlifted to Vancouver where he underwent emergency surgery. His brother, Craig McMorris, spoke to The National television news program shortly after the accident and described what had happened: "There was a fog [...] coming in and out, and Mark, unfortunately, drifted a little bit too far left, [...] we're hitting a feature, and he goes a little too far left and ends up in a clump of trees." McMorris suffered a fractured jaw, a fractured left arm, a ruptured spleen, a pelvic fracture, rib fractures and a collapsed left lung. He underwent two successful surgeries.

McMorris returned to snowboard competition and competed for Team Canada during the 2018 Winter Olympics, only eleven months after his accident. He placed third in Men's Slopestyle behind fellow Canadian Max Parrot and the American gold medalist Red Gerard, earning his second consecutive Olympic bronze medal. Following his long journey from injuries to a return to the podium, McMorris said that "Canada definitely had my back 100 percent, and I felt that. It was definitely motivating, and it gave me a little extra boost and energy to do my very best, and it feels really good when you end up doing well. I’m feeling really honoured to be on the podium again."

=== 2022 Winter Olympics and 2023 X-Games ===
McMorris was named to Canada's 2022 Olympic team in Beijing. On February 7, 2022, McMorris won a bronze medal in the slopestyle event, at the 2022 Winter Olympics, his third consecutive in the event.

At the 2023 Winter X Games McMorris defended his gold medal in the men's slopestyle to set a record for the most Winter X Games medals with 22, breaking a tie with Jamie Anderson of the United States.

=== 2026 Winter Olympics ===
On January 16, 2026, McMorris was named to team Canada's snowboard slopestyle and big air roster for the Milano Cortina Winter Olympics.

== Personal life ==
McMorris was born in Regina, Saskatchewan, Canada, and is the son of Saskatchewan provincial politician Don McMorris, a grain farmer, and Cindy McMorris, a nurse. His older brother, Craig McMorris, is also a professional snowboarder. McMorris attended Dr. Martin LeBoldus High School. McMorris also competed in wakeboarding before devoting himself to snowboarding. From 2013 until 2024, he dated Hawaiian professional surfer, Coco Ho. He has several tattoos, including one of sheaves of wheat representing the province of Saskatchewan. In 2006, when Mark was only 12, he rode his wakeboard around Lake Wascana pulled behind a dragon boat for 3.5 km in attempt to set a Guinness World Record. He was asked to take part after an event in Regina.
