= Alexey Sobolev =

Russian snowboarder (born 1991)

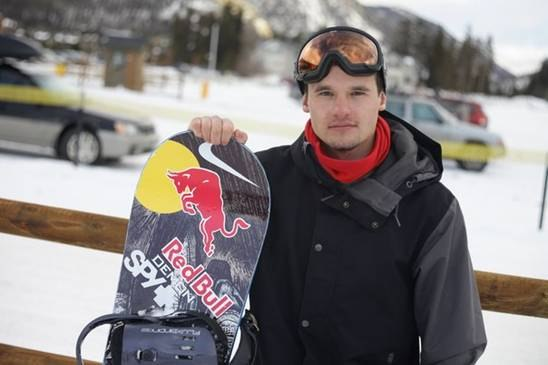
- 2013

Personal information
- Born: 1 September 1991 (age 34) Novosibirsk
- Height: 5 ft 9 in (175 cm)
- Weight: 152 lb (69 kg)

Sport
- Country: Russia
- Sport: Snowboarding

Alexey Sobolev (born in Novosibirsk on 1 September 1991) is a Russian snowboarder competing in slopestyle and big air.

Sobolev qualified for the 2014 Winter Olympics where he finished in the 20th place in the men's slopestyle, being eliminated in the semifinal.

He garnered attention because his board might have referenced the band Pussy Riot and because his helmet had his iPhone's telephone number printed on the side until he was forced to cover it up by officials.

== Results ==
2014 Winter Olympics

Event	Qualification				Semifinal				Final			
Event	Run 1	Run 2	Best	Rank	Run 1	Run 2	Best	Rank	Run 1	Run 2	Best	Rank
Men's slopestyle	63.00	28.50	63.00	10 QS	20.00	57.50	57.50	12	did not advance			
