= Petja Piiroinen =

Finnish snowboarder (born 1991)

Medal record

Representing Finland

FIS Snowboarding World Championships
Gold medal – first place	2011 La Molina	Big air

Petja Piiroinen (born 15 August 1991) is a snowboarder from Finland. He won the gold medal at the 2011 FIS Snowboarding World Championships in the big air event. He is the younger brother of fellow snowboarder Peetu Piiroinen.
