= Anton Mamaev =

Russian snowboarder (born 1997)

Personal information
- Full name: Anton Viacheslavovich Mamaev
- National team: Russia
- Born: 24 May 1997 (age 29) Ekaterinburg, Russia

Sport
- Country: Russia
- Sport: Snowboarding
- Event: Slopestyle
Medal record
Representing Russia
Winter Universiade
Gold medal – first place	2019 Krasnoyarsk	Slopestyle

Anton Viacheslavovich Mamaev (Russian: Антон Вячеславович Мамаев; born 24 May 1997) is a Russian competitive snowboarder. He competed as an Olympic Athlete from Russia at the 2018 Winter Olympics in the Men's big air, finishing 32nd overall and failing to advance out of the heats. Mamaev previously reached the semifinal in the big air at the 2017 World Championships.
