= Adrian Krainer (snowboarder) =

Austrian snowboarder (born 1992)

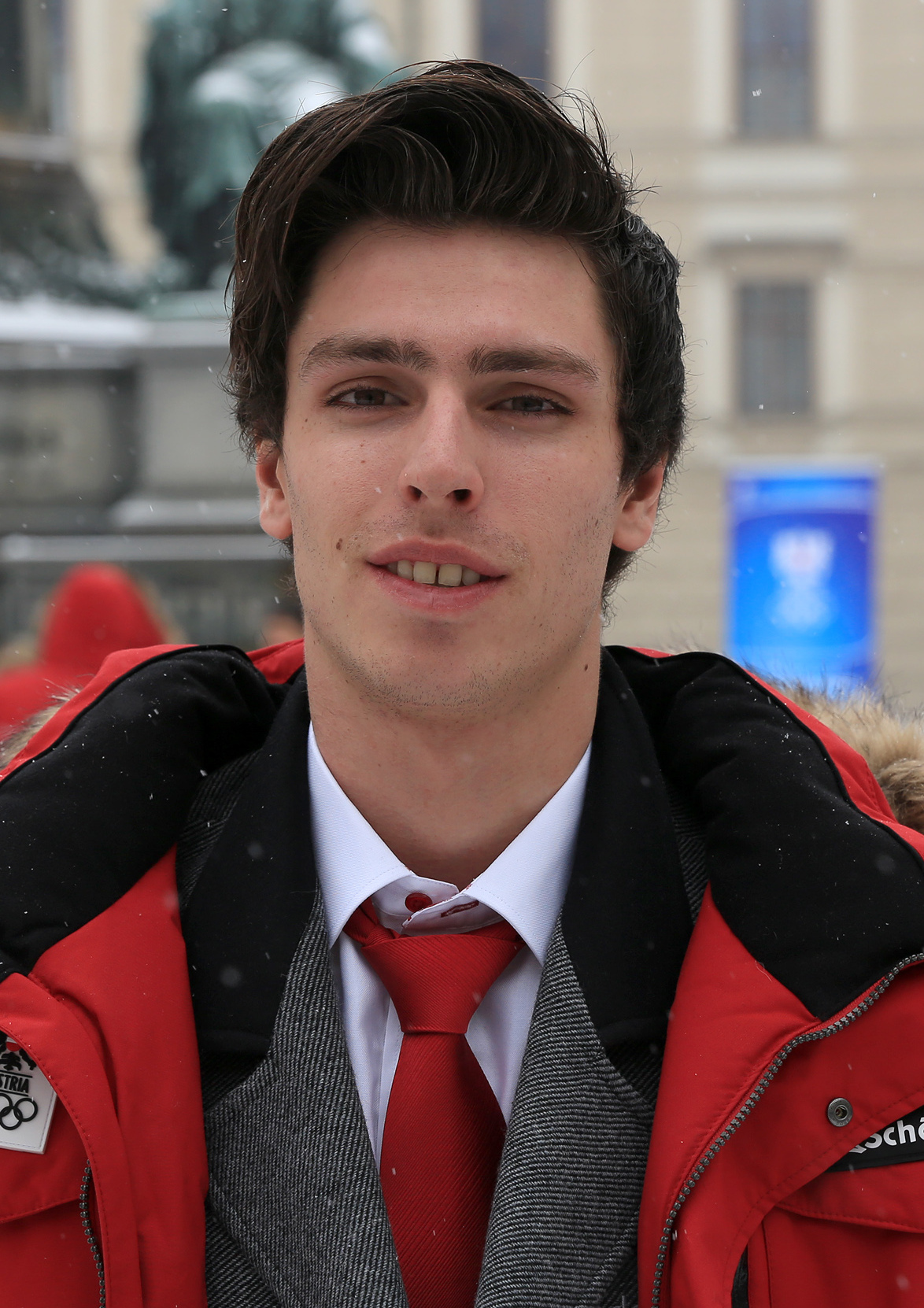
Adrian Krainer (2014)

Adrian Krainer (born 22 November 1992) is an Austrian snowboarder. He was a participant at the 2014 Winter Olympics in Sochi.
