= Janne Korpi =

Finland snowboarder

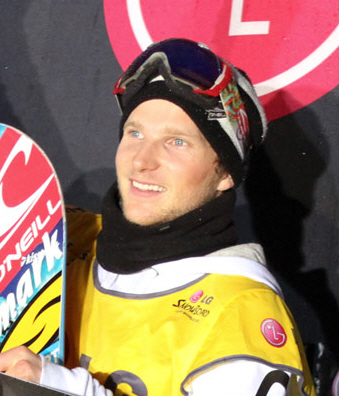

Personal information
- Born: 5 February 1986 (age 40) Vihti, Finland
- Height: 5 ft 11 in (180 cm)
- Weight: 163 lb (74 kg)

Sport
- Country: Finland
- Sport: Snowboarding
Medal record
Men's snowboarding
Representing Finland
World Championships
Bronze medal – third place	2007 Arosa	Big Air
Bronze medal – third place	2013 Stoneham	Slopestyle

Janne Korpi (born in Vihti on 5 February 1986) is a Finnish snowboarder and harness racing driver.

He is a three-time Olympian representing Finland in Snowboarding at the 2006 Winter Olympics, the 2010 Winter Olympics and the 2018 Winter Olympics.

Janne Korpi is a son of Pekka Korpi, one of the most famous harness racers in Finland. Janne himself has also successfully raced in harness racing.
