= Billy Morgan (snowboarder) =

British snowboarder (born 1989)

Personal information
- Born: 2 April 1989 (age 37) Southampton, England
- Height: 5 ft 11 in (180 cm)
- Weight: 159 lb (72 kg)

Sport
- Country: Great Britain
- Sport: Snowboarding
Medal record
Men's snowboarding
Representing Great Britain
Olympic Games
Bronze medal – third place	2018 Pyeongchang	Big Air
Winter X Games Europe
Bronze medal – third place	2016 Oslo (Europe Summer)	Big Air
- Updated on 24 February 2018

Billy Morgan (born 2 April 1989) is an English snowboarder, who won a Big Air Bronze medal at the 2018 Winter Olympics in Pyeongchang, South Korea.

== Career ==
Born in Southampton, England, he competed for Great Britain at the 2014 Winter Olympics in Sochi. Morgan finished 10th in the men's slopestyle final.

Morgan achieved his first podium finish in an FIS Snowboard World Cup event at the World Cup Finals meeting at Sierra Nevada, Spain in March 2013, where he finished third in the slopestyle competition. He finished the 2012-13 season ranked second in snowboard slopestyle in the FIS World Ranking List. Morgan has won three medals at FIS World Cup.

Morgan first took up snowboarding at the age of fourteen on a dry slope after previously competing in acrobatic gymnastics. In April 2015, Morgan landed the world's first "quad cork". The following day, Morgan noted of the Quad Cork "We’d done a bunch of riding that morning, just prepping for it, and had a reshape on the jump. After that, the quicker I did it the better. I thought ‘right, if I don’t do it now, I wont have the minerals to do it’ so I went back up, composed myself, and just sent it.".

He took his first X Games medal in February 2016 at X Games Oslo, where he finished third in the big air competition. Competing at the 2018 Winter Olympics in Pyeongchang, Morgan won the bronze medal in the Big Air event.

In an interview published on 23 April 2021, Morgan confirmed he had officially retired from Olympic competition and expressed his desire to serve as an ambassador for the sport to spread snowboarding to younger generations.

== Personal life ==
Morgan was born to Eddie and Joanne, and has an older brother, Ashley. He attended Bellemoor School. As of April 2021, Morgan lives with his girlfriend and son.
