= Lucien Koch =

Swiss snowboarder (born 1996)

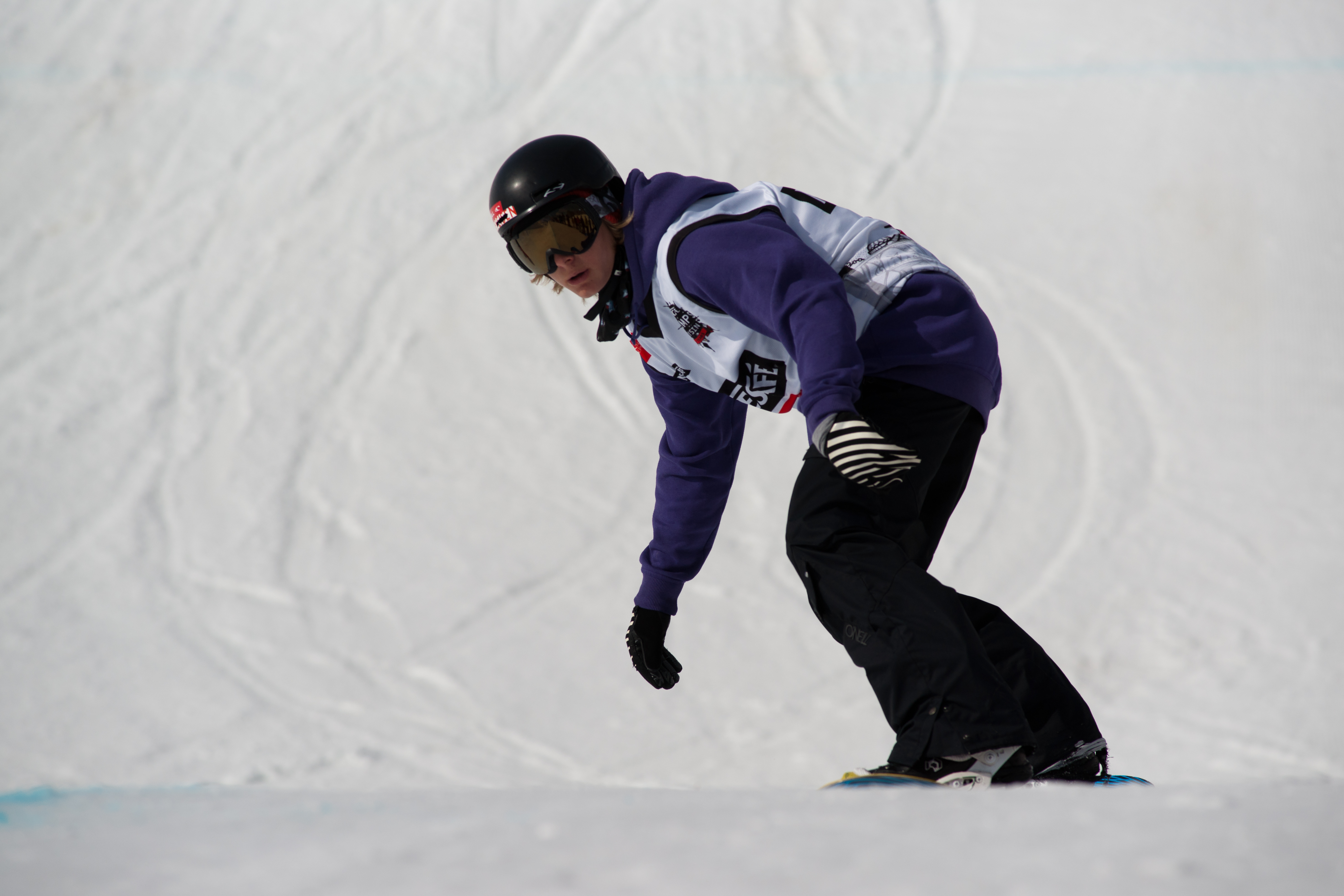
Lucien Koch – 20th Leysin Nescafé Champs, 8 - 13 February 2011

Lucien Koch (born 2 January 1996) is a Swiss snowboarder. He participated at the 2014 Winter Olympics in Sochi.
