= Mathias Weissenbacher =

Austrian snowboarder (born 1992)

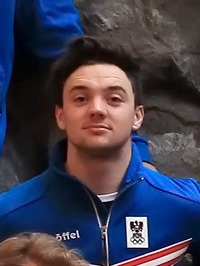
Mathias Weissenbacher

Mathias Weissenbacher (born 3 February 1992) is an Austrian snowboarder. He is a participant at the 2014 Winter Olympics in Sochi.
