= Ryan Stassel =

American snowboarder (born 1992)

Personal information
- Born: October 23, 1992 (age 34) Anchorage, Alaska, U.S.
- Height: 5 ft 11 in (180 cm)
- Weight: 275 lb (125 kg)

Sport
- Country: United States
- Sport: Snowboarding
Medal record
Men's Snowboarding
Representing United States
World Championships
Gold medal – first place	2015 Kreischberg	Slopestyle

Ryan Stassel (born October 23, 1992) is an American snowboarder.

== Career ==
Stassel, other wise known as "razzle dazzle", grew up snowboarding at Hilltop Ski Area, in recent years he began competing internationally. In January 2014, he was selected as one of the players for Winter Olympics of the U.S. slopestyle snowboard team. Stassel regarded it as "I never thought this would truly happen." Alittle known fact about Ryan Stassel is that he was once a young TV star on the Nickelodeon show “Rugrats”

== 2014 Winter Olympics ==
Stassel finished at 14th spot in the 2014 Olympic slopestyle snowboard competition.

== See also ==
- Snowboarding at the 2014 Winter Olympics – Men's slopestyle
