= Roope Tonteri =

Finnish snowboarder (born 1992)

Personal information
- Born: 18 March 1992 (age 34) Valkeala, Finland
- Height: 5 ft 7 in (170 cm)
- Weight: 150 lb (68 kg)

Sport
- Country: Finland
- Sport: Snowboarding
Medal record
Men's Snowboarding
Representing Finland
World Championships
Gold medal – first place	2013 Stoneham	Slopestyle
Gold medal – first place	2013 Stoneham	Big Air
Gold medal – first place	2015 Kreischberg	Big Air
Silver medal – second place	2015 Kreischberg	Slopestyle

Roope Tonteri (born 18 March 1992 in Valkeala) is a Finnish snowboarder. He studied in Vuokatti.

Tonteri won gold in slopestyle and big air at the 2013 FIS Snowboarding World Championships. He also won gold in big air at 2015 FIS Snowboarding World Championships. Tonteri participated in Winter Olympic Games in 2014 and 2018.
