= FIS Snowboarding World Championships 2013 – Women's slopestyle =

The women's slopestyle competition of the 2013 FIS Snowboarding World Championships was held in Stoneham-et-Tewkesbury, Québec, Canada on January 17 & 18, 2013. 37 athletes from 16 countries competed.

== Medalists ==
Gold	Spencer O'Brien; Canada (CAN)
Silver	Sina Candrian; Switzerland (SUI)
Bronze	Torah Bright; Australia (AUS)

== Results ==
=== Qualification ===
The following are the results of the qualification.

Rank	Bib	Name	Country	Run 1	Run 2	Best Score	Note
1	15	Spencer O'Brien	Canada	83.33	93.00	93.00	Q
2	33	Jenny Jones	Great Britain	88.66	71.66	88.66	Q
3	29	Sina Candrian	Switzerland	85.00	88.33	88.33	Q
4	16	Ty Walker	United States	73.66	86.66	86.66	Q
5	37	Torah Bright	Australia	83.00	23.33	83.00	Q
6	32	Merika Enne	Finland	80.66	11.00	80.66	Q
7	27	Isabel Derungs	Switzerland	80.00	28.33	80.00	
7	7	Shelly Gotlieb	New Zealand	25.66	80.00	80.00	
9	12	Jessika Jenson	United States	77.00	26.33	77.00	
10	17	Katie Ormerod	Great Britain	66.66	26.00	66.66	
11	9	Cilka Sadar	Slovenia	18.00	66.33	66.33	
12	30	Jordan Karlinski	United States	65.66	49.66	65.66	
13	1	Lauren Staveley	Australia	64.00	60.66	64.00	
14	8	Kateřina Vojáčková	Czech Republic	63.33	52.33	63.33	
14	23	Šárka Pančochová	Czech Republic	63.33	55.00	63.33	
16	20	Anna Gyarmati	Hungary	17.00	61.66	61.66	
17	11	Joanna Dzierzawski	United States	18.66	61.33	61.33	
18	31	Rebecca Torr	New Zealand	59.33	45.66	59.33	
18	13	Anna Gasser	Austria	59.33	9.00	59.33	
20	22	Sam Denena	Canada	58.66	11.33	58.66	
21	18	Tania Detomas	Italy	57.66	20.66	57.66	
22	3	Stefi Luxton	New Zealand	46.66	54.33	54.33	
23	25	Brooke Voigt	Canada	49.00	54.00	54.00	
24	21	Lucie Zábranská	Czech Republic	31.33	12.00	31.33	
25	4	Roberta Irarrazabal	Chile	18.33	16.00	18.33	
26	10	Eva Cameron	Czech Republic	9.33	6.66	9.33	
27	34	Yelizaveta Yaniuk	Belarus	8.66	7.66	8.66	
	2	Breanna Stangeland	Canada	Did not start			
	5	Elena Könz	Switzerland	Did not start			
	6	Anja Štefan	Croatia	Did not start			
	14	Silvia Mittermüller	Germany	Did not start			
	19	Natallia Karamushka	Belarus	Did not start			
	24	Christina Gruber	Austria	Did not start			
	26	Urška Pribošič	Slovenia	Did not start			
	28	Ella Suitiala	Finland	Did not start			
	35	Courtney Phillipson	Australia	Did not start			
	36	Morena Makar	Croatia	Did not start			

=== Final ===
Rank	Bib	Name	Country	Run 1	Run 2	Best Score	Notes
1st place, gold medalist(s)	15	Spencer O'Brien	Canada	93.25	21.25	93.25	
2nd place, silver medalist(s)	29	Sina Candrian	Switzerland	81.50	33.50	81.50	
3rd place, bronze medalist(s)	37	Torah Bright	Australia	65.75	77.50	77.50	
4	32	Merika Enne	Finland	9.25	59.50	59.50	
5	16	Ty Walker	United States	30.75	28.00	30.75	
6	33	Jenny Jones	Great Britain	20.50	12.25	20.50	
