= Snowboarding at the 2014 Winter Olympics – Women's slopestyle =

Women's slopestyle at the XXII Olympic Winter Games
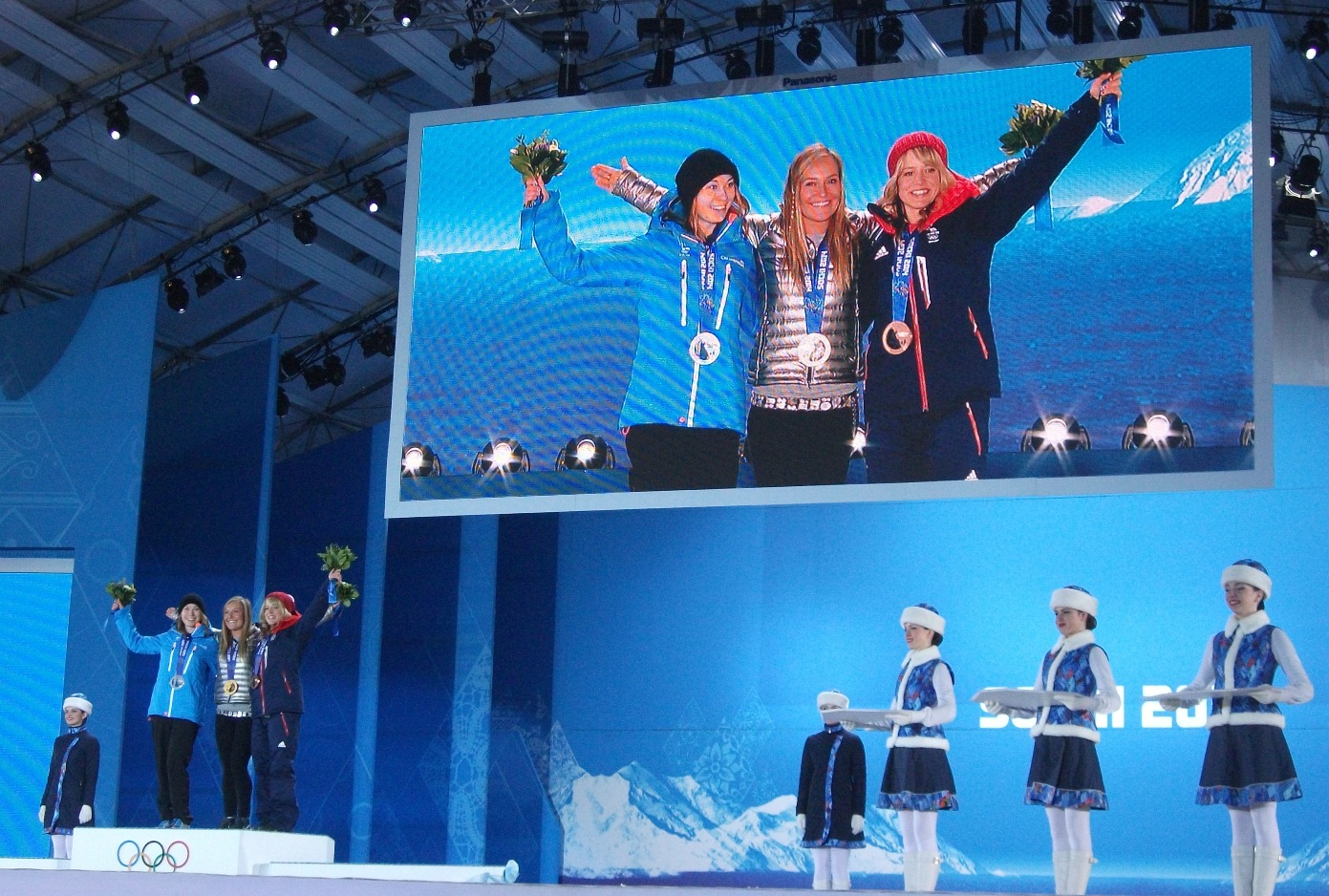
- Venue: Rosa Khutor Extreme Park
- Date: 6 February 2014 (qualification); 9 February 2014 (semi-finals & final)
- Competitors: 23 from 11 nations
- Winning score: 95.25

Medalists
1st place, gold medalist(s)		Jamie Anderson	United States
2nd place, silver medalist(s)		Enni Rukajärvi	Finland
3rd place, bronze medalist(s)		Jenny Jones	Great Britain

The women's slopestyle competition of the Sochi 2014 Olympics was held at Rosa Khutor Extreme Park on 6 February (qualification) and 9 February (semi-finals and final). This was the first time that a slopestyle event was included in the Olympic program.

Jamie Anderson of the United States became the first Olympic champion. Enni Rukajärvi from Finland took the silver, and Jenny Jones from Great Britain won the bronze medal.

== Qualification ==
An athlete must have placed in the top 30 in at a World Cup event after July 2012 or at the 2013 World Championships and a minimum of 50 FIS points. A total of 24 quota spots are available to athletes to compete at the games. A maximum of 4 athletes can be entered by a National Olympic Committee.

Slovenia's Cilka Sadar also earned a spot to compete, but did not compete due to an injury occurring just days before the competition, leaving a total of 23 athletes from 11 nations.

== Schedule ==
All times are (UTC+4).

Date	Time	Round
6 February	14:00	Qualification
9 February	10:30	Semi-finals
9 February	13:15	Final

== Results ==
=== Qualification ===
The top four riders from each heat automatically qualify for the final round. The remaining riders qualify for the semi-final round. The result is calculated as the best score of the two runs. The following were the results of the qualification round:

QF – Qualified directly for the Final
QS – Qualified for the Semi-final
Bib – Bib number
DNS – Did Not Start
Tie – Tie breaking points

Rank	Heat	Bib	Name	Country	Run 1	Run 2	Best	Notes
1	1	5	Isabel Derungs	Switzerland	82.50	87.50	87.50	QF
2	1	11	Torah Bright	Australia	85.25	80.00	85.25	QF
3	1	4	Spencer O'Brien	Canada	82.75	65.00	82.75	QF
4	1	8	Enni Rukajärvi	Finland	79.00	23.75	79.00	QF
5	1	1	Jenny Jones	Great Britain	74.25	21.75	74.25	QS
6	1	10	Rebecca Torr	New Zealand	70.75	33.75	70.75	QS
7	1	6	Christy Prior	New Zealand	67.50	70.50	70.50	QS
8	1	9	Stefi Luxton	New Zealand	59.75	34.25	59.75	QS
9	1	3	Sina Candrian	Switzerland	58.25	36.50	58.25	QS
10	1	7	Aimee Fuller	Great Britain	44.50	39.00	44.50	QS
11	1	12	Shelly Gotlieb	New Zealand	18.00	30.75	30.75	QS
12	1	2	Kjersti Buaas	Norway	12.50	17.75	17.75	QS
1	2	14	Anna Gasser	Austria	89.50	95.50	95.50	QF
2	2	18	Jamie Anderson	United States	93.50	DNS	93.50	QF
3	2	20	Elena Könz	Switzerland	86.25	38.00	86.25	QF
4	2	22	Karly Shorr	United States	45.00	84.75	84.75	QF
5	2	17	Šárka Pančochová	Czech Republic	77.75	33.75	77.75	QS
6	2	16	Jenna Blasman	Canada	60.25	51.50	60.25	QS
7	2	23	Jessika Jenson	United States	34.00	58.50	58.50	QS
8	2	15	Silje Norendal	Norway	31.00	39.00	39.00	QS
9	2	19	Cheryl Maas	Netherlands	18.00	31.25	31.25	QS
10	2	21	Merika Enne	Finland	17.00	DNS	17.00	QS
11	2	13	Ty Walker	United States	1.00	DNS	1.00	QS

=== Semi-final ===
The top four riders from the semi-final round qualify for the final round. The result is calculated as the best score of the two runs.

Rank	Bib	Name	Country	Run 1	Run 2	Best	Notes
1	17	Šárka Pančochová	Czech Republic	90.50	22.50	90.50	QF
2	3	Sina Candrian	Switzerland	84.25	81.50	84.25	QF
3	1	Jenny Jones	Great Britain	82.25	83.25	83.25	QF
4	15	Silje Norendal	Norway	16.75	78.75	78.75	QF
5	23	Jessika Jenson	United States	72.00	50.50	72.00	
6	13	Ty Walker	United States	66.00	43.75	66.00	
7	12	Shelly Gotlieb	New Zealand	63.25	33.75	63.25	
8	9	Stefi Luxton	New Zealand	18.25	60.25	60.25	
9	7	Aimee Fuller	Great Britain	33.75	37.50	37.50	
10	10	Rebecca Torr	New Zealand	27.25	32.50	32.50	
11	16	Jenna Blasman	Canada	32.25	10.50	32.25	
12	19	Cheryl Maas	Netherlands	30.75	14.75	30.75	
	6	Christy Prior	New Zealand				DNS
	2	Kjersti Buaas	Norway				DNS
	21	Merika Enne	Finland				DNS

=== Final ===
In the final, Šárka Pančochová, who did not qualify directly to the final and had to go through the semi-final, posted the best result in the first run, but fell in the second run and was classified fifth. In the second run, first Jones, who also went through the semi-final, scored 87.25, followed by Sina Candrian with 87.00. Rukajärvi, running fifth, scored 92.50, and pushed Pančochová out of medal position. Anderson scored 95.25 and took the lead with two more athletes to go, Isabel Derungs and Anna Gasser. They both fell and were left out of the medals.

Rank	Bib	Name	Country	Run 1	Run 2	Best	Notes
1st place, gold medalist(s)	18	Jamie Anderson	United States	80.75	95.25	95.25	
2nd place, silver medalist(s)	8	Enni Rukajärvi	Finland	73.75	92.50	92.50	
3rd place, bronze medalist(s)	1	Jenny Jones	Great Britain	73.00	87.25	87.25	
4	3	Sina Candrian	Switzerland	77.25	87.00	87.00	
5	17	Šárka Pančochová	Czech Republic	86.25	20.00	86.25	
6	22	Karly Shorr	United States	39.00	75.00	75.00	
7	11	Torah Bright	Australia	64.75	66.25	66.25	
8	5	Isabel Derungs	Switzerland	58.50	15.25	58.50	
9	20	Elena Könz	Switzerland	24.50	54.50	54.50	
10	14	Anna Gasser	Austria	49.00	51.75	51.75	
11	15	Silje Norendal	Norway	49.50	32.00	49.50	
12	4	Spencer O'Brien	Canada	30.00	35.00	35.00	
