= 2014–15 in skiing =

From October 25, 2014 to April 4, 2015, the following skiing events took place at various locations around the world.

== Alpine skiing ==
=== International Ski Federation ===
- October 25, 2014 – March 22, 2015: 2015 Alpine Skiing World Cup
  - October 25 & 26, 2014: World Cup #1 in (Austria) Sölden
    - Men's giant slalom winner: (Austria) Marcel Hirscher
    - Women's giant slalom winner: (Austria) Anna Fenninger
  - November 15 & 16, 2014: World Cup #2 in (Finland) Levi (Kittilä)
    - Men's slalom winner: (Norway) Henrik Kristoffersen
    - Women's slalom winner: (Slovenia) Tina Maze
  - November 29 & 30, 2014: World Cup #3a in (Canada) Lake Louise, Alberta (Ski Resort)
    - Men's downhill winner: (Norway) Kjetil Jansrud
    - Men's super-G winner: (Norway) Kjetil Jansrud
  - November 29 & 30, 2014: World Cup #3b in (United States) Aspen, Colorado
    - Women's slalom winner: (Austria) Nicole Hosp
    - Women's giant slalom winner: (Austria) Eva-Maria Brem
  - December 2 – 7, 2014: World Cup #4a in (Canada) Lake Louise
    - Women's downhill winner #1: (Slovenia) Tina Maze
    - Women's downhill winner #2: (United States) Lindsey Vonn
    - Women's super-G winner: (Switzerland) Lara Gut
  - December 2 – 7, 2014: World Cup #4b in (United States) Beaver Creek Resort (Avon, Colorado)
    - Men's downhill winner: (Norway) Kjetil Jansrud
    - Men's super-G winner: (Austria) Hannes Reichelt
    - Men's giant slalom winner: (United States) Ted Ligety
  - December 12 – 14, 2014: World Cup #5 in (Sweden) Åre #1
    - Men's giant slalom winner: (Austria) Marcel Hirscher
    - Women's giant slalom winner: (Slovenia) Tina Maze
    - Men's slalom winner: (Austria) Marcel Hirscher
    - Women's slalom winner: (Sweden) Maria Pietilä-Holmner
  - December 17 – 20, 2014: World Cup #6a in (Italy) Val Gardena / Groeden
    - Men's downhill winner: (United States) Steven Nyman
    - Men's super-G winner: (Norway) Kjetil Jansrud
  - December 19 – 21, 2014: World Cup #6b in (France) Val-d'Isère
    - Women's downhill winner: (United States) Lindsey Vonn
    - Women's super-G winner: (Austria) Elisabeth Görgl
  - December 21, 2014: World Cup #7 in (Italy) Alta Badia
    - Men's giant slalom winner: (Austria) Marcel Hirscher
  - December 22, 2014: World Cup #8 in (Italy) Madonna di Campiglio
    - Men's slalom winner: (Germany) Felix Neureuther
  - December 26 – 28, 2014: World Cup #9a in (Italy) Santa Caterina di Valfurva
    - Men's downhill winner: (United States) Travis Ganong
  - December 28 & 29, 2014: World Cup #9b in (Austria) Kühtai in Tirol
    - Women's giant slalom winner: (Sweden) Sara Hector
    - Women's slalom winner: (United States) Mikaela Shiffrin
  - January 4 – 6: World Cup #10 in (Croatia) Zagreb-Sljeme
    - Men's slalom winner: (Austria) Marcel Hirscher
    - Women's slalom winner: (United States) Mikaela Shiffrin
  - January 10 & 11: World Cup #11b in (Switzerland) Adelboden
    - Men's giant slalom winner: (Austria) Marcel Hirscher
    - Men's slalom winner: (Italy) Stefano Gross
  - January 13 – 18: World Cup #12a in (Switzerland) Wengen
    - Men's Alpine skiing combined winner: (Switzerland) Carlo Janka
    - Men's slalom skiing winner: (Germany) Felix Neureuther
    - Men's Downhill: (Austria) Hannes Reichelt
  - January 13: World Cup #12b in (Austria) Flachau
    - Women's slalom winner: (Sweden) Frida Hansdotter
  - January 15 – 18: World Cup #12c in (Italy) Cortina d'Ampezzo
    - Women's Downhill #1 winner: (Italy) Elena Fanchini
    - Women's Downhill #2 winner: (United States) Lindsey Vonn
  - January 20 – 25: World Cup #13a in (Austria) Kitzbühel
    - Men's super-G winner: (Italy) Dominik Paris
    - Men's Alpine skiing combined winner: (France) Alexis Pinturault
    - Men's downhill winner: (Norway) Kjetil Jansrud
    - Men's slalom winner: (Sweden) Mattias Hargin
  - January 22 – 25: World Cup #13b in (Switzerland) St. Moritz
    - Women's downhill winner: (Switzerland) Lara Gut
    - Women's super-G winner: (United States) Lindsey Vonn
  - January 27: World Cup #14 in (Austria) Schladming
    - Men's slalom winner: (Russia) Aleksandr Khoroshilov
  - February 19 – 22: World Cup #15a in (Austria) Saalbach-Hinterglemm
    - Men's downhill winner: (Austria) Matthias Mayer
    - Men's super-G winner: (Austria) Matthias Mayer
  - February 21 & 22: World Cup #15b in (Slovenia) Maribor
    - Women's giant slalom winner: (Austria) Anna Fenninger
    - Women's slalom winner: (United States) Mikaela Shiffrin
  - February 26 – March 1: World Cup #16a in (Germany) Garmisch-Partenkirchen #1
    - Men's downhill winner: (Austria) Hannes Reichelt
    - Men's giant slalom winner: (Austria) Marcel Hirscher
  - February 27 – March 2: World Cup #16b in (Bulgaria) Bansko
    - Women's alpine combined winner: (Austria) Anna Fenninger
    - Women's super-G winner: (Austria) Anna Fenninger
  - March 5 – 8: World Cup #17a in (Norway) Kvitfjell
    - Men's downhill winner: (Austria) Hannes Reichelt
    - Men's super-G winner: (Norway) Kjetil Jansrud
  - March 5 – 8: World CUp #17b in (Germany) Garmisch-Partenkirchen #2
    - Women's downhill winner: (Liechtenstein) Tina Weirather
    - Women's super-G winner: (United States) Lindsey Vonn
  - March 13 & 14: World Cup #18a in (Sweden) Åre #2
    - Women's giant slalom winner: (Austria) Anna Fenninger
    - Women's slalom winner: (United States) Mikaela Shiffrin
  - March 14 & 15: World Cup #18b in (Slovenia) Kranjska Gora
    - Men's giant slalom winner: (France) Alexis Pinturault
    - Men's slalom winner: (Norway) Henrik Kristoffersen
  - March 16 – 22: World Cup #19 (final) in (France) Méribel
    - Men's downhill winner: (Norway) Kjetil Jansrud
    - Women's downhill winner: (United States) Lindsey Vonn
    - Men's super-G winner: (Canada) Dustin Cook
    - Women's super-G winner: (United States) Lindsey Vonn
    - Men's slalom winner: (Austria) Marcel Hirscher
    - Women's slalom winner: (United States) Mikaela Shiffrin
    - Men's giant slalom winner: (Norway) Henrik Kristoffersen
    - Women's giant slalom winner: (Austria) Anna Fenninger
    - Mixed Team Event winners: Switzerland (Charlotte Chable, Michelle Gisin, Wendy Holdener, Gino Caviezel, Justin Murisier, Reto Schmidiger)
- February 2 – 15: 2015 FIS Alpine World Ski Championships in (United States) Vail / Beaver Creek
  - Men's super-G winner: (Austria) Hannes Reichelt
  - Women's super-G winner: (Austria) Anna Fenninger
  - Men's downhill winner: (Switzerland) Patrick Küng
  - Women's downhill winner: (Slovenia) Tina Maze
  - Men's alpine combined winner: (Austria) Marcel Hirscher
  - Women's alpine combined winner: (Slovenia) Tina Maze
  - Men's giant slalom winner: (United States) Ted Ligety
  - Women's giant slalom winner: (Austria) Anna Fenninger
  - Mixed Team Event winners: Austria (Eva-Maria Brem, Nicole Hosp, Michaela Kirchgasser, Marcel Hirscher, Christoph Nösig, Philipp Schörghofer)
  - Men's slalom winner: (France) Jean-Baptiste Grange
  - Women's slalom winner: (United States) Mikaela Shiffrin
- March 7 – 13: World Junior Alpine Skiing Championships 2015 in Hafjell
  - Men's Junior Giant slalom winner: (Norway) Henrik Kristoffersen
  - Women's Junior Giant slalom winner: (Austria) Nina Ortlieb
  - Men's Junior Slalom winner: (Norway) Henrik Kristoffersen
  - Women's Junior Slalom winner: (United States) Paula Moltzan
  - Men's Junior Alpine Combined winner: (Switzerland) Loïc Meillard
  - Women's Junior Super Combined winner: (Switzerland) Rahel Kopp
  - Men's Junior Super G winner: (Slovenia) Miha Hrobat
  - Women's Junior Super G winner: (Italy) Federica Sosio
  - Men's Junior Downhill winner: (Italy) Henri Battilani
  - Women's Junior Downhill winner: (Norway) Mina Fürst Holtmann
  - Mixed Junior Team Event winners: Norway

=== IPC Alpine Skiing World Cup ===
- January 8 – February 5: 2014–15 IPC Alpine Skiing World Cup
  - January 8 – 11: World Cup #1 in (Spain) La Molina (Barcelona)
    - For men's SL1 results, click here.
    - For men's SL2 results, click here.
    - For men's SL3 results, click here.
    - For men's SL4 results, click here.
    - For women's SL1 results, click here.
    - For women's SL2 results, click here.
    - For women's SL3 results, click here.
    - For women's SL4 results, click here.
  - January 26 – 30: World Cup #2 in (France) Tignes
    - For men's and women's downhill results, click here.
  - February 2 – 5: World Cup #3 (final) in (Switzerland) St. Moritz
    - For men's and women's slalom and giant slalom results, click here.
- February 28 – March 10: 2015 IPC Alpine Skiing World Championships in (Canada) Panorama, British Columbia
  - Russia won both the gold and overall medal tallies.

== Biathlon ==
=== IBU World Cup ===
- November 29, 2014 – March 22, 2015: 2014–15 Biathlon World Cup
  - November 29, 2014 – December 7, 2014: World Cup #1 in (Sweden) Östersund
    - Men's 20 km winner: (Norway) Emil Hegle Svendsen
    - Men's 10 km Sprint winner: (France) Martin Fourcade
    - Men's 12.5 km Pursuit winner: (France) Martin Fourcade
    - Women's 15 km winner: (Belarus) Darya Domracheva
    - Women's 7.5 km Sprint winner: (Norway) Tiril Eckhoff
    - Women's 10 km Pursuit winner: (Finland) Kaisa Mäkäräinen
    - Mixed 2 x 6 km + 2 x 7.5 km Relay winners: France (Anaïs Bescond, Anaïs Chevalier, Simon Fourcade, and Martin Fourcade)
  - December 11 – 14, 2014: World Cup #2 in (Austria) Hochfilzen
    - Men's 10 km Sprint winner: (Norway) Johannes Thingnes Bø
    - Women's 7.5 km Sprint winner: (Finland) Kaisa Mäkäräinen
    - Men's 4 x 7.5 km Relay winners: Russia (Maxim Tsvetkov, Timofey Lapshin, Dmitry Malyshko, and Anton Shipulin)
    - Women's 4 x 6 km Relay winners: Germany (Luise Kummer, Franziska Hildebrand, Vanessa Hinz, and Franziska Preuß)
    - Men's 12.5 km Pursuit winner: (France) Martin Fourcade
    - Women's 10 km Pursuit winner: (Finland) Kaisa Mäkäräinen
  - December 17 – 21, 2014: World Cup #3 in (Slovenia) Pokljuka
    - Men's 10 km Sprint winner: (Russia) Anton Shipulin
    - Women's 7.5 km Sprint winner: (Czech Republic) Gabriela Soukalová
    - Men's 12.5 km Pursuit winner: (Norway) Emil Hegle Svendsen
    - Women's 10 km Pursuit winner: (Belarus) Darya Domracheva
    - Men's 15 km Mass Start winner: (Russia) Anton Shipulin
    - Women's 12.5 km Mass Start winner: (Finland) Kaisa Mäkäräinen
  - January 6 – 11: World Cup #4 in (Germany) Oberhof
    - Men's 10 km Sprint winner: (France) Martin Fourcade
    - Women's 7.5 km Sprint winner: (Czech Republic) Veronika Vítková
    - Men's 15 km Mass Start winner: (France) Martin Fourcade
    - Women's 12.5 km Mass Start winner: (Belarus) Darya Domracheva
    - Men's 4 x 7.5 km Relay winners: Russia (Evgeniy Garanichev, Timofey Lapshin, Dmitry Malyshko, and Anton Shipulin)
    - Women's 4 x 6 km Relay winners: Czech Republic (Eva Puskarčíková, Gabriela Soukalová, Jitka Landová, and Veronika Vítková)
  - January 13 – 18: World Cup #5 in (Germany) Ruhpolding
    - Men's 10 km Sprint winner: (Norway) Johannes Thingnes Bø
    - Women's 7.5 km Sprint winner: (Norway) Fanny Welle-Strand Horn
    - Men's 15 km Mass Start winner: (Germany) Simon Schempp
    - Women's 12.5 km Mass Start winner: (Belarus) Darya Domracheva
    - Men's 4 x 7.5 km Relay winners: Norway (Ole Einar Bjørndalen, Erlend Bjøntegaard, Johannes Thingnes Bø, and Emil Hegle Svendsen)
    - Women's 4 x 6 km Relay winners: Czech Republic (Eva Puskarčíková, Gabriela Soukalová, Jitka Landová, and Veronika Vítková)
  - January 21 – 25: World Cup #6 in (Italy) Rasen-Antholz
    - Men's 10 km Sprint winner: (Germany) Simon Schempp
    - Women's 7.5 km Sprint winner: (Belarus) Darya Domracheva
    - Men's 12.5 km Pursuit winner: (Germany) Simon Schempp
    - Women's 10 km Pursuit winner: (Belarus) Darya Domracheva
    - Men's 4 x 7.5 km Relay winners: Norway (Ole Einar Bjørndalen, Tarjei Bø, Johannes Thingnes Bø, and Emil Hegle Svendsen)
    - Women's 4 x 6 km Relay winners: Germany (Franziska Hildebrand, Franziska Preuß, Luise Kummer, and Laura Dahlmeier)
  - February 5 – 8: World Cup #7 in (Czech Republic) Nové Město na Moravě
    - Men's 10 km Sprint winner: (Slovenia) Jakov Fak
    - Women's 7.5 km Sprint winner: (Germany) Laura Dahlmeier
    - Men's 12.5 km Pursuit winner: (Slovenia) Jakov Fak
    - Women's 10 km Pursuit winner: (Belarus) Darya Domracheva
    - Mixed Single Mixed Relay winners: Russia (Yana Romanova and Alexey Volkov)
    - Mixed 2 x 6 km + 2 x 7.5 km Relay winners: Norway (Fanny Welle-Strand Horn, Tiril Eckhoff, Johannes Thingnes Bø, and Tarjei Bø)
  - February 11 – 15: World Cup #8 in (Norway) Oslo-Holmenkollen
    - Men's Individual 20 km winner: (France) Martin Fourcade
    - Women's Individual 15 km winner: (Finland) Kaisa Mäkäräinen
    - Men's 10 km Sprint winner: (Germany) Arnd Peiffer
    - Women's 7.5 km Sprint winner: (Belarus) Darya Domracheva
    - Men's 4 x 7.5 km Team Relay winners: Russia (Evgeniy Garanichev, Maxim Tsvetkov, Dmitry Malyshko, and Anton Shipulin)
    - Women's 4 x 6 km Team Relay winners: Czech Republic (Eva Puskarčíková, Gabriela Soukalová, Jitka Landová, and Veronika Vítková)
  - March 18 – 22: World Cup Final (#9) in (Russia) Khanty-Mansiysk
    - Men's 10 km Sprint winner: (France) Martin Fourcade
    - Women's 7.5 km Sprint winner: (Finland) Kaisa Mäkäräinen
    - Men's 12.5 km Pursuit winner: (Canada) Nathan Smith
    - Women's 10 km Pursuit winner: (Belarus) Darya Domracheva
    - Men's 15 km Mass Start winner: (Slovenia) Jakov Fak
    - Women's 12.5 km Mass Start winner: (Germany) Laura Dahlmeier

=== Winter IBU Cup ===
- November 28, 2014 – March 7, 2015: 2014–15 Winter IBU Cup
  - November 28 – 30, 2014: IBU Cup #1 in (Norway) Beitostølen
    - Men's 10 km Sprint #1 winner: (Latvia) Andrejs Rastorgujevs
    - Women's 7.5 km Sprint #1 winner: (Poland) Weronika Nowakowska-Ziemniak
    - Men's 10 km Sprint #2 winner: (Germany) Florian Graf
    - Women's 7.5 km Sprint #2 winner: (Russia) Evgenia Seledtsova
  - December 12 – 14, 2014: IBU Cup #2 in (Italy) Martell
    - Canceled, due to lack of snow at the site.
  - December 15 – 20, 2014: IBU Cup #3 in (Austria) Obertilliach
    - Men's 20 km Individual winner: (Ukraine) Vitaliy Kilchytskyy
    - Women's 10 km Individual winner: (Germany) Tina Bachmann
    - Men's 10 km Sprint #1 winner: (France) Baptiste Jouty
    - Men's 10 km Sprint #2 winner: (France) Baptiste Jouty
    - Women's 7.5 km Sprint #1 winner: (Italy) Federica Sanfilippo
    - Women's 7.5 km Sprint #2 winner: (Ukraine) Iryna Varvynets
    - Mixed 2x6+2x7.5 km Relay winners: Norway (Thekla Brun-Lie, Hilde Fenne, Vegard Gjermundshaug, Lars Helge Birkeland)
  - January 7 – 11: IBU Cup #4 in (Poland) Duszniki-Zdrój
    - Men's 10 km Sprint #1 winner: (Germany) Florian Graf
    - Men's 10 km Sprint #2 winner: (Germany) Johannes Kuehn
    - Women's 7.5 km Sprint #1 winner: (Russia) Irina Trusova
    - Women's 7.5 km Sprint #2 winner: (Germany) Miriam Gössner
    - Men's 12.5 km Pursuit winner: (Germany) Johannes Kuehn
    - Women's 10 km Pursuit winner: (Germany) Miriam Gössner
  - January 15 – 18: IBU Cup #5 in (Italy) Ridnaun-Val Ridanna
    - Men's 10 km Sprint winner: (Russia) Alexey Slepov
    - Women's 7.5 km Sprint winner: (Germany) Miriam Gössner
    - Men's 12.5 km Pursuit winner: (Norway) Lars Helge Birkeland
    - Women's 10 km Pursuit winner: (Germany) Miriam Gössner
    - Mixed 2x6+2x7.5 km Relay winners: Germany (Annika Knoll, Karolin Horchler, Johannes Kuehn, Christoph Stephan)
  - February 6 – 8: IBU Cup #6 in (Slovakia) Brezno–Osrblie
    - Men's 10 km Sprint winner: (Norway) Lars Helge Birkeland
    - Women's 7.5 km Sprint winner: (Russia) Galina Nechkasova
    - Men's 12.5 km Pursuit winner: (Norway) Lars Helge Birkeland
    - Women's 10 km Pursuit winner: (Germany) Karolin Horchler
  - February 27 – March 1: IBU Cup #7 in (Canada) Canmore
    - Men's 10 km Sprint #1 winner: (Russia) Alexey Kornev
    - Women's 7.5 km Sprint #1 winner: (Germany) Karolin Horchler
    - Men's 10 km Sprint #2 winner: (Germany) Florian Graf
    - Women's 7.5 km Sprint #2 winner: (Germany) Karolin Horchler
  - March 1 – 7: Final Winter IBU Cup (#8) in (Canada) Canmore
    - Men's 20 km Individual winner: (Russia) Matvey Eliseev
    - Women's 15 km Individual winner: (Germany) Karolin Horchler
    - Men's 10 km Sprint winner: (Germany) Christoph Stephan
    - Women's 7.5 km Sprint winner: (Russia) Anna Nikulina
    - Mixed 2x6km+2x7.5 km Relay winners: France (Anaïs Chevalier, Marine Bolliet, Baptiste Jouty, Antonin Guigonnat)

=== Other biathlon competitions ===
- January 27 – February 3: Biathlon European Championships 2015 in (Estonia) Otepää
  - Junior: Russia won both the gold and overall medal tallies.
  - Senior: Russia won both the gold and overall medal tallies.
- February 17 – 24: 2015 IBU Youth/Junior World Championships in (Belarus) Minsk – Raubichi
  - Russia won both the gold and overall medal tallies.
- March 3 – 15: Biathlon World Championships 2015 in (Finland) Kontiolahti
  - Men's 10 km Sprint winner: (Norway) Johannes Thingnes Bø
  - Women's 7.5 km Sprint winner: (France) Marie Dorin Habert
  - Men's 12.5 km Pursuit winner: (Germany) Erik Lesser
  - Women's 10 km Pursuit winner: (France) Marie Dorin Habert
  - Men's 20 km Individual winner: (France) Martin Fourcade
  - Women's 15 km Individual winner: (Russia) Ekaterina Yurlova
  - Men's 4 x 7.5 km Team Relay winners: (Germany) (Erik Lesser, Daniel Böhm, Arnd Peiffer, Simon Schempp)
  - Women's 4 x 6 km Team Relay winners: (Germany) (Franziska Hildebrand, Franziska Preuß, Vanessa Hinz, Laura Dahlmeier)
  - Men's 15 km Mass Start winner: (Slovenia) Jakov Fak
  - Women's 12.5 km Mass Start winner: (Ukraine) Valj Semerenko
  - Mixed 2 x 6 km + 2 x 7.5 km Team Relay winners: (Czech Republic) (Veronika Vítková, Gabriela Soukalová, Michal Šlesingr, Ondřej Moravec)

=== IPC Biathlon World Cup and World Championships ===
- December 10, 2014 – March 22, 2015: 2014–15 IPC Biathlon World Cup
  - December 10 – 17, 2014: World Cup #1 in (Finland) Vuokatti
    - Russia won both the gold and overall medal tallies.
  - February 4 – 11: World Cup #2 in (South Korea) PyeongChang
    - Cancelled, for unknown reasons.
  - March 16 – 22: World Cup #3 (final) in (Norway) Surnadal
    - Russia won both the gold and overall medal tallies.
- January 24 – February 1: 2015 IPC Biathlon and Cross-Country Skiing World Championships in (United States) Cable, Wisconsin
  - Russia won both the gold and overall medal tallies. (Biathlon portion)

== Cross-country skiing ==
- November 29, 2014 – March 15, 2015: 2014–15 FIS Cross-Country World Cup
  - November 29 & 30, 2014: World Cup #1 in (Finland) Kuusamo
    - Men's Sprint Classical winner: (Norway) Eirik Brandsdal
    - Women's Sprint Classical winner: (Norway) Marit Bjørgen
    - Men's 15 km Classical winner: (Finland) Iivo Niskanen
    - Women's 10 km Classical winner: (Norway) Therese Johaug
  - December 5 – 7, 2014: World Cup #2 in (Norway) Lillehammer (Stage World Cups)
    - Men's Sprint Freestyle winner: (Norway) Pål Golberg
    - Men's 10 km Freestyle winner: (Norway) Martin Johnsrud Sundby
    - Men's 15 km Classical Pursuit winner: (Norway) Martin Johnsrud Sundby
    - Women's Sprint Freestyle winner: (Norway) Marit Bjørgen
    - Women's 5 km Freestyle winner: (Norway) Therese Johaug
    - Women's 10 km Classical Pursuit winner: (Norway) Marit Bjørgen
  - December 13 & 14, 2014: World Cup #3 in (Switzerland) Davos
    - Men's 15 km Classical winner: (Norway) Martin Johnsrud Sundby
    - Women's 10 km Classical winner: (Norway) Therese Johaug
    - Men's Sprint Freestyle winner: (Norway) Finn Hågen Krogh
    - Women's Sprint Freestyle winner: (Norway) Ingvild Flugstad Østberg
  - December 20 & 21, 2014: World Cup #4 in (Switzerland) Davos
    - Men's 15 km Freestyle winner: (Norway) Anders Gløersen
    - Women's 10 km Freestyle winner: (Norway) Marit Bjørgen
    - Men's Sprint Freestyle winner: (Italy) Federico Pellegrino
    - Women's Sprint Freestyle winner: (Norway) Marit Bjørgen
  - January 17 & 18: World Cup #5 in (Estonia) Otepää
    - Men's Sprint Classical winner: (Norway) Tomas Northug
    - Women's Sprint Classical winner: (Norway) Ingvild Flugstad Østberg
    - Men's Team Sprint Freestyle winners: Russia (Alexei Petukhov / Sergey Ustiugov)
    - Women's Team Sprint Freestyle winners: Sweden (Ida Ingemarsdotter / Stina Nilsson)
  - January 23 – 25: World Cup #6 in (Russia) Rybinsk
    - Men's 15 km Freestyle winner: (Switzerland) Dario Cologna
    - Women's 10 km Freestyle winner: (Norway) Astrid Uhrenholdt Jacobsen
    - Men's Sprint Freestyle winner: (Italy) Federico Pellegrino
    - Women's Sprint Freestyle winner: (Sweden) Jennie Oeberg
    - Men's Skiathlon winner: (Russia) Maxim Vylegzhanin
    - Women's Skiathlon winner: (Russia) Yuliya Chekaleva
  - February 14 & 15: World Cup #7 in (Sweden) Östersund
    - Men's Sprint Classical winner: (Norway) Finn Hågen Krogh
    - Women's Sprint Classical winner: (Norway) Marit Bjørgen
    - Men's 15 km Freestyle winner: (Norway) Finn Hågen Krogh
    - Women's 10 km Freestyle winner: (Sweden) Charlotte Kalla
  - March 7 & 8: World Cup #8 in (Finland) Lahti
    - Men's Sprint Freestyle winner: (Norway) Eirik Brandsdal
    - Women's Sprint Freestyle winner: (Norway) Marit Bjørgen
    - Men's 15 km Classical winner: (Italy) Francesco de Fabiani
    - Women's 10 km Classical winner: (Norway) Marit Bjørgen
  - March 11: World Cup #9 in (Norway) Drammen
    - Men's Sprint Classical winner: (Norway) Eirik Brandsdal
    - Women's Sprint Classical winner: (Norway) Maiken Caspersen Falla
  - March 14 & 15: World Cup #10 (final) in (Norway) Oslo
    - Men's 50 km Freestyle Mass Start winner: (Norway) Sjur Røthe
    - Women's 30 km Freestyle Mass Start winner: (Norway) Marit Bjørgen

=== Tour de Ski ===
- January 3 – 11: 2014–15 Tour de Ski in Germany, Switzerland, and Italy
  - January 3 & 4: TdS #1 & TdS #2 in (Germany) Oberstdorf
    - Men's 4 km Freestyle Prologue winner: (Switzerland) Dario Cologna
    - Women's 3 km Freestyle Prologue winner: (Norway) Marit Bjørgen
    - Men's 15 km Classical Pursuit winner: (Norway) Petter Northug
    - Women's 10 km Classical Pursuit winner: (Norway) Marit Bjørgen
  - January 6: TdS #3 in (Switzerland) Val Müstair
    - Men's Sprint Freestyle winner: (Italy) Federico Pellegrino
    - Women's Sprint Freestyle winner: (Norway) Marit Bjørgen
  - January 7 & 8: TdS #4 & TdS#5 in (Italy) Toblach
    - Men's 10 km Classical winner: (Kazakhstan) Alexey Poltoranin
    - Women's 5 km Classical winner: (Norway) Marit Bjørgen
    - Men's 25 km Freestyle Pursuit winner: (Norway) Petter Northug
    - Women's 15 km Freestyle Pursuit winner: (Norway) Marit Bjørgen
  - January 10 & 11: TdS #6 & TdS #7 in (Italy) Fiemme Valley (final)
    - Men's 15 km Classical Mass Start winner: (Germany) Tim Tscharnke
    - Women's 10 km Classical Mass Start winner: (Norway) Therese Johaug
    - Men's 9 km Freestyle Pursuit winner: (Norway) Martin Johnsrud Sundby
    - Women's 9 km Freestyle Pursuit winner: (Norway) Marit Bjørgen
- Men's Overall winner: (Norway) Martin Johnsrud Sundby
- Women's Overall winner: (Norway) Marit Bjørgen

=== Nordic World Ski Championships (CC) ===
- February 18 – March 1: FIS Nordic World Ski Championships 2015
  - Men's 15 km Freestyle winner: (Sweden) Johan Olsson
  - Women's 10 km Freestyle winner: (Sweden) Charlotte Kalla
  - Men's 30 km Pursuit winner: (Russia) Maxim Vylegzhanin
  - Women's 15 km Pursuit winner: (Norway) Therese Johaug
  - Men's Sprint Classical winner: (Norway) Petter Northug
  - Women's Sprint Classical winner: (Norway) Marit Bjørgen
  - Men's Team sprint winners: (Norway) Finn Hågen Krogh / Petter Northug
  - Women's Team sprint winners: (Norway) Ingvild Flugstad Østberg / Maiken Caspersen Falla
  - Men's 4 x 10 km Team Relay winners: (Norway) Niklas Dyrhaug / Didrik Tønseth / Anders Gløersen / Petter Northug
  - Women's 4 x 5 km Team Relay winners: (Norway) Heidi Weng / Therese Johaug / Astrid Uhrenholdt Jacobsen / Marit Bjørgen
  - Men's 50 km Classical Mass Start winner: (Norway) Petter Northug
  - Women's 30 km Classical Mass Start winner: (Norway) Therese Johaug

=== IPC Cross-Country World Cup ===
- December 10, 2014 – March 22, 2015: 2014–15 IPC Cross-Country World Cup
  - December 10 – 17, 2014: World Cup #1 in (Finland) Vuokatti, Sotkamo
    - Russia won both the gold and overall medal tallies.
  - February 4 – 11: World Cup #2 in (South Korea) PyeongChang
    - Cancelled for unknown reasons.
  - February 14 – 18: World Cup #3 in (Japan) Asahikawa
    - The United States won the gold medal tally. Russia won the overall medal tally.
  - March 16 – 22: World Cup #4 (final) in (Norway) Surnadal
    - Russia won both the gold and overall medal tallies.
- January 24 – February 1: 2015 IPC Biathlon and Cross-Country Skiing World Championships in (United States) Cable, Wisconsin
  - Russia won both the gold and overall medal tallies. (Cross-country section)

== Freestyle skiing ==
- December 5, 2014 – March 15, 2015: 2014–15 FIS Freestyle Skiing World Cup

=== Mogul skiing and Aerials ===
- December 13, 2014 – March 15, 2015: 2014–15 Moguls and Aerials Schedule
  - December 13, 2014: World Cup #1 in (Finland) Kuusamo
    - Men's Dual Moguls winner: (Canada) Philippe Marquis
    - Women's Dual Moguls winner: (Kazakhstan) Yuliya Galysheva
  - December 20 & 21, 2014: World Cup #2 in Beijing
    - Men's Aerials #1 winner: (China) Qi Guangpu
    - Men's Aerials #2 winner: (China) Qi Guangpu
    - Women's Aerials #1 winner: (China) Xu Mengtao
    - Women's Aerials #2 winner: (China) Xu Mengtao
    - Team Aerials winners: China 1 (Jia Zongyang, Xu Mengtao, Qi Guangpu)
  - January 3: World Cup #3 in (Canada) Calgary
    - Men's Moguls winner: (Canada) Mikaël Kingsbury
    - Women's Moguls winner: (United States) Hannah Kearney
  - January 8 – 10: World Cup #4 in (United States) Deer Valley
    - Men's Aerials winner: (China) Qi Guangpu
    - Women's Aerials winner: (United States) Ashley Caldwell
    - Men's Moguls winner: (Canada) Mikaël Kingsbury
    - Women's Moguls winner: (United States) K.C. Oakley
    - Men's Dual Moguls winner: (Canada) Mikaël Kingsbury
    - Women's Dual Moguls winner: (Canada) Justine Dufour-Lapointe
  - January 29 – 31: World Cup #5 in (United States) Lake Placid, New York
    - Men's Aerials winner #1: (United States) Mac Bohonnon
    - Women's Aerials winner #1: (Belarus) Aliaksandra Ramanouskaya
    - Men's Aerials winner #2: (China) Zhou Hang
    - Women's Aerials winner #2: (Australia) Renee McElduff
    - Men's Moguls winner: (Canada) Mikaël Kingsbury
    - Women's Moguls winner: (Canada) Justine Dufour-Lapointe
  - February 7: World Cup #6 in (Canada) Val Saint-Côme (Montreal)
    - Men's Moguls winner: (Canada) Mikaël Kingsbury
    - Women's Moguls winner: (United States) Hannah Kearney
  - February 21: World Cup #7 in (Russia) Moscow
    - Men's Aerials winner: (United States) Mac Bohonnon
    - Women's Aerials winner: (Australia) Danielle Scott
  - February 28 & March 1: World Cup #8 in (Japan) Tazawako (Tazawa Ski Area)
    - Men's Moguls winner: (Canada) Mikaël Kingsbury
    - Women's Moguls winner: (United States) Hannah Kearney
    - Men's Dual Moguls winner: (Canada) Mikaël Kingsbury
    - Women's Dual Moguls winner: (United States) Morgan Schild
  - March 1: World Cup #9 in (Belarus) Minsk
    - Men's Aerials winner: (Ukraine) Oleksandr Abramenko
    - Women's Aerials winner: (United States) Ashley Caldwell
  - March 15: World Cup #10 (final) in (France) Megève
    - Men's Dual Moguls winner: (France) Anthony Benna
    - Women's Dual Moguls winner: (United States) Hannah Kearney

=== Ski cross ===
- December 5, 2014 – March 14, 2015: 2014–15 Ski Cross Schedule
  - December 5 & 6, 2014: World Cup #1 in (Canada) Nakiska (Calgary)
    - Men's winner: (Austria) Thomas Zangerl
    - Women's winner: (Canada) Marielle Thompson
  - January 8 – 10: World Cup #2 in (France) Val Thorens
    - Men's winner #1: (Germany) Andreas Schauer
    - Women's winner #1: (Canada) Marielle Thompson
    - Men's winner: #2: (Switzerland) Marc Bischofberger
    - Women's winner #2: (Canada) Marielle Thompson
  - February 5 – 7: World Cup #3 in (Switzerland) Arosa
    - Men's winner #1: (Sweden) Victor Oehling Norberg
    - Women's winner #1: (Switzerland) Fanny Smith
    - Men's winner #2: (Sweden) Victor Oehling Norberg
    - Women's winner #2: (Switzerland) Fanny Smith
  - February 13 – 15: World Cup #4 in (Sweden) Åre
    - Men's winner #1: (Sweden) Victor Oehling Norberg
    - Women's winner #1: (France) Alizée Baron
    - Men's winner #2: (France) Jean-Frédéric Chapuis
    - Women's winner #2: (Sweden) Anna Holmlund
  - February 20 – 22: World Cup #5 in (Germany) Tegernsee
    - Men's winner #1: (France) Jean-Frédéric Chapuis
    - Women's winner #1: (Switzerland) Fanny Smith
    - Men's winner #2: (France) Jean-Frédéric Chapuis
    - Women's winner #2: (Sweden) Anna Holmlund
  - March 13 & 14: World Cup #6 (final) in (France) Megève
    - Men's winner #1: (France) Sylvain Miaillier
    - Women's winner #1: (Sweden) Anna Holmlund
    - Men's winner #2: (France) Jean-Frédéric Chapuis
    - Women's winner #2: (Sweden) Anna Holmlund

=== Half-pipe and Slopestyle ===
- December 3, 2014 – March 14, 2015: 2014–15 Half-pipe and Slopestyle Schedule
  - December 3 & 5, 2014: World Cup #1 in (United States) Copper Mountain (Denver)
    - Men's Half-pipe winner: (United States) David Wise
    - Women's Half-pipe winner: (New Zealand) Janina Kuzma
  - February 25 – 28: World Cup #2 in (United States) Park City, Utah
    - Men's Slopestyle winner: (United States) Joss Christensen
    - Women's Slopestyle winner: (Sweden) Emma Dahlström
    - Men's Half-pipe winner: (United States) Gus Kenworthy
    - Women's Half-pipe winner: (Japan) Ayana Onozuka
  - March 11 & 12: World Cup #3 in (France) Tignes
    - Men's Half-pipe winner: (Canada) Mike Riddle
    - Women's Half-pipe winner: (Canada) Cassie Sharpe
  - March 13 & 14: World Cup #4 (final) in (Switzerland) Silvaplana
    - Men's Slopestyle winner: (Norway) Felix Stridsberg Usterud
    - Women's Slopestyle winner: (Norway) Tiril Sjåstad Christiansen

=== World freestyle ski championships ===
- January 15 – 25: FIS Freestyle Ski and Snowboarding World Championships 2015 in (Austria) Kreischberg
- Note: This championship is paired with the FIS Snowboard World Championships 2015 together.
  - Men's Aerials winner: (China) Qi Guangpu
  - Women's Aerials winner: (Australia) Laura Peel
  - Men's Moguls winner: (France) Anthony Benna
  - Women's Moguls winner: (Canada) Justine Dufour-Lapointe
  - Men's Dual moguls winner: (Canada) Mikaël Kingsbury
  - Women's Dual moguls winner: (United States) Hannah Kearney
  - Men's halfpipe: (United States) Kyle Smaine
  - Women's halfpipe: (Switzerland) Virginie Faivre
  - Men's Slopestyle: (Switzerland) Fabian Bösch
  - Women's Slopestyle: (Germany) Lisa Zimmermann
  - Men's Ski Cross winner: (Slovenia) Filip Flisar
  - Women's Ski Cross winner: (Austria) Andrea Limbacher
- March 24 – April 1: Freestyle Skiing FIS Junior World Championships 2015 in (Italy) Chiesa in Valmalenco
  - Men's Junior Aerials winner: (United States) Harrison Smith
  - Women's Junior Aerials winner: (Belarus) Aliaksandra Ramanouskaya
  - Men's Junior Moguls winner: (Russia) Aleksey Pavlenko
  - Women's Junior Moguls winner: (France) Perrine Laffont
  - Men's Junior Dual Moguls winner: (Russia) Aleksey Pavlenko
  - Women's Junior Dual Moguls winner: (France) Perrine Laffont
  - Men's Junior Slopestyle winner: (Switzerland) Luca Schuler
  - Women's Junior Slopestyle winner: (Japan) Nanaho Kiriyama
  - Men's Junior Halfpipe winner: (New Zealand) Beau-James Wells
  - Women's Junior Halfpipe winner: (United Kingdom) Molly Summerhayes
  - Men's Junior Ski Cross winner: (United States) Tyler Wallasch
  - Women's Junior Ski Cross winner: (Canada) India Sherret

== Nordic combined ==
- November 29, 2014 – March 14, 2015: 2014–15 FIS Nordic Combined World Cup
  - November 29 & 30, 2014: World Cup #1 in (Finland) Kuusamo
    - Individual winner: (Germany) Johannes Rydzek
    - Team winners: (Norway) Håvard Klemetsen & Jørgen Graabak
  - December 6 & 7, 2014: World Cup #2 in (Norway) Lillehammer
    - Individual winner #1: (Germany) Eric Frenzel
    - Individual winner #2: (Norway) Mikko Kokslien
  - December 20 & 21, 2014: World Cup #3 in (Austria) Ramsau am Dachstein
    - Individual winner: (France) Jason Lamy-Chappuis
    - Team winners: (Norway) Mikko Kokslien, Håvard Klemetsen, Jan Schmid, and Jørgen Graabak
  - January 3 & 4: World Cup #4 in (Germany) Schonach im Schwarzwald
    - Individual winner: (Austria) Lukas Klapfer
    - Team winners: (Germany) Eric Frenzel, Tino Edelmann, Björn Kircheisen, and Johannes Rydzek
  - January 10 & 11: World Cup #5 in (France) Chaux-Neuve
    - Individual winner #1: (Germany) Eric Frenzel
    - Individual winner #2: (Norway) Magnus Moan
  - January 16 – 18: World Cup #6 in (Austria) Seefeld
    - Individual winner #1: (Germany) Eric Frenzel
    - Individual winner #2: (Germany) Eric Frenzel
    - Individual winner #3: (Germany) Eric Frenzel
  - January 23 & 24: World Cup #7 in (Japan) Sapporo
    - Individual winner #1: (Germany) Eric Frenzel
    - Individual winner #2: (Germany) Eric Frenzel
  - January 30 – February 1: World Cup #8 in (Italy) Fiemme Valley
    - Individual winner #1: (Austria) Bernhard Gruber
    - Team winners: (Norway) Jan Schmid and Joergen Graabak
    - Individual winner #2: (Norway) Joergen Graabak
  - March 6 & 7: World Cup #9 in (Finland) Lahti
    - Individual winner: (Japan) Akito Watabe
    - Team winners: (Germany) (Fabian Rießle & Johannes Rydzek)
  - March 12: World Cup #10 in (Norway) Trondheim
    - Individual winner: (Norway) Magnus Moan
  - March 14: World Cup #11 (final) in (Norway) Oslo
    - Individual winner: (Japan) Akito Watabe
- February 20 – 28: FIS Nordic World Ski Championships 2015
  - Individual Gundersen Large Hill / 10 km winner: (Austria) Bernhard Gruber
  - Individual Gundersen Normal Hill / 10 km winner: (Germany) Johannes Rydzek
  - Team Normal Hill / 4×5 km winners: (Germany) Tino Edelmann / Eric Frenzel / Fabian Rießle / Johannes Rydzek
  - Team Sprint Large Hill / 2×7.5 km winners: (France) François Braud / Jason Lamy-Chappuis

== Nordic skiing ==
- January 24 – February 1: 2015 IPC Biathlon and Cross-Country Skiing World Championships in (United States) Cable, Wisconsin
  - For cross-country results, click here.
  - For biathlon results, click here.
- February 18 – March 1: FIS Nordic World Ski Championships 2015 in (Sweden) Falun
  - Norway won both the gold and overall medal tallies.

== Ski jumping ==
- November 22, 2014 – March 22, 2015: 2014–15 FIS Ski Jumping World Cup

=== Men ===
- November 21 – 23, 2014: World Cup #1 in (Germany) Klingenthal
  - Winner: (Czech Republic) Roman Koudelka
- November 27 – 29, 2014: World Cup #2 in (Finland) Kuusamo
  - Event #1 winner: (Switzerland) Simon Ammann
  - Event #2 Co-winners: (Switzerland) Simon Ammann and (Japan) Noriaki Kasai
- December 5 – 7, 2014: World Cup #3 in (Norway) Lillehammer
  - Event #1 winner: (Austria) Gregor Schlierenzauer
  - Event #2 winner: (Czech Republic) Roman Koudelka
- December 12 – 14, 2014: World Cup #3 in (Russia) Nizhny Tagil
  - Event #1 winner: (Norway) Anders Fannemel
  - Event #2 winner: (Germany) Severin Freund
- December 19 – 21, 2014: World Cup #4 in (Switzerland) Engelberg
  - Event #1 winner: (Germany) Richard Freitag
  - Event #2 winner: (Czech Republic) Roman Koudelka
- January 9 & 10: World Cup #5 in (Austria) Tauplitz/Bad Mitterndorf
  - Winner: (Germany) Severin Freund
- January 15: World Cup #6 in (Poland) Wisła
  - Winner: (Austria) Stefan Kraft
- January 16 – 18: World Cup #7 in (Poland) Zakopane
  - Winner: (Poland) Kamil Stoch
- January 23 – 25: World Cup #8 in (Japan) Sapporo
  - Event #1 winner: (Slovenia) Peter Prevc
  - Event #2 winner: (Czech Republic) Roman Koudelka
- January 30 – February 1: World Cup #9 in (Germany) Willingen
  - Event #1 winner: (Poland) Kamil Stoch
  - Event #2 winner: (Germany) Severin Freund
- February 7 & 8: World Cup #10 in (Germany) Titisee-Neustadt
  - Event #1 winner: (Germany) Severin Freund
  - Event #2 winner: (Norway) Anders Fannemel
- February 13 – 15: World Cup #11 in (Norway) Vikersund
  - Event #1 winner: (Slovenia) Peter Prevc
  - Event #2 winner: (Germany) Severin Freund
- March 6 – 8: World Cup #12 in (Finland) Lahti
  - Winner: (Austria) Stefan Kraft
- March 10: World Cup #13 in (Finland) Kuopio
  - Winner: (Germany) Severin Freund
- March 12: World Cup #14 in (Norway) Trondheim
  - Winner: (Germany) Severin Freund
- March 13 – 15: World Cup #15 in (Norway) Oslo
  - Event #1 winner: (Germany) Severin Freund
  - Event #2 winner: (Germany) Severin Freund
- March 19 – 22: World Cup #16 (final) in (Slovenia) Planica
  - Event #1 winner: (Slovenia) Peter Prevc
  - Event #2 winner: (Slovenia) Jurij Tepeš

=== Women ===
- December 5, 2014: World Cup #1 in (Norway) Lillehammer
  - Winner: (Slovenia) Špela Rogelj
- January 10 & 11: World Cup #2 in (Japan) Sapporo
  - Winner #1: (Japan) Sara Takanashi
  - Winner #2: (Japan) Sara Takanashi
- January 18: World Cup #3 in (Japan) Zaō, Miyagi
  - Winner: (Germany) Carina Vogt
- January 24 & 25: World Cup #4 in (Germany) Oberstdorf
  - Winner #1: (Austria) Daniela Iraschko-Stolz
  - Winner #2: (Austria) Daniela Iraschko-Stolz
- January 31 & February 1: World Cup #5 in (Austria) Hinzenbach
  - Winner #1: (Austria) Daniela Iraschko-Stolz
  - Winner #2: (Germany) Carina Vogt
- February 7 & 8: World Cup #6 in (Romania) Râșnov
  - Winner #1: (Austria) Daniela Iraschko-Stolz
  - Winner #2: (Japan) Sara Takanashi
- February 14 & 15: World Cup #7 in (Slovenia) Ljubno ob Savinji
  - Winner #1: (Japan) Sara Takanashi
  - Winner #2: (Austria) Daniela Iraschko-Stolz
- March 13: World Cup #8 (final) in (Norway) Oslo
  - Winner: (Japan) Sara Takanashi

=== Team (men only) ===
- November 22, 2014: Team World Cup #1 in Klingenthal
  - Winners: Germany (Markus Eisenbichler, Richard Freitag, Andreas Wellinger, and Severin Freund)
- January 17: Team World Cup #2 in (Poland) Zakopane
  - Winners: Germany (Michael Neumayer, Marinus Kraus, Richard Freitag, and Severin Freund)
- January 31: Team World Cup #3 in (Germany) Willingen
  - Winners: Slovenia (Jurij Tepeš, Nejc Dežman, Jernej Damjan, and Peter Prevc)
- March 7: Team World Cup #4 in (Finland) Lahti
  - Winners: Norway (Anders Bardal, Anders Jacobsen, Anders Fannemel, Rune Velta)
- March 21: Team World Cup #5 (final) in Planica
  - Winners: Slovenia (Jurij Tepeš, Anže Semenič, Robert Kranjec, Peter Prevc)

=== Four Hills Tournament ===
- December 28, 2014 – January 6, 2015: 2014–15 Four Hills Tournament in Germany and Austria
  - December 27 – 29, 2014: FHT #1 in (Germany) Oberstdorf
    - Winner: (Austria) Stefan Kraft
  - December 31, 2014 – January 1, 2015: FHT #2 in (Germany) Garmisch-Partenkirchen
    - Winner: (Norway) Anders Jacobsen
  - January 3 & 4: FHT #3 in (Austria) Innsbruck
    - Winner: (Germany) Richard Freitag
  - January 5 & 6: FHT #4 (final) in (Austria) Bischofshofen
    - Winner: (Austria) Michael Hayböck
- Overall winner: (Austria) Stefan Kraft

=== Nordic World Ski Championships (SJ) ===
- February 19 – 28: FIS Nordic World Ski Championships 2015
  - Men's Individual Normal Hill winner: (Norway) Rune Velta
  - Men's individual large hill winner: (Germany) Severin Freund
  - Men's team large hill winners: (Norway) Anders Bardal / Anders Jacobsen / Anders Fannemel / Rune Velta
  - Women's Individual Normal Hill winner: (Germany) Carina Vogt
  - Mixed Team Normal Hill winners: (Germany) Carina Vogt / Richard Freitag / Katharina Althaus / Severin Freund

== Snowboarding ==
- December 4, 2014 – March 21, 2015: 2014–15 FIS Snowboard World Cup

=== Freestyle snowboarding ===
- December 4, 2014 – March 14, 2015: 2014–15 Freestyle Snowboarding Schedule
  - December 4 – 6, 2014: World Cup #1 in (United States) Copper Mountain
    - Men's Half-pipe winner: (United States) Taylor Gold
    - Women's Half-pipe winner: (United States) Kelly Clark
  - December 20, 2014: World Cup #2 in (Turkey) Istanbul
    - Men's Big Air winner: (Belgium) Seppe Smits
    - Women's Big Air winner: (United States) Ty Walker
  - February 18 – 21: World Cup #3 in (Canada) Stoneham-et-Tewkesbury (Stoneham Mountain Resort)
    - Men's Big Air winner: (Canada) Darcy Sharpe
    - Women's Big Air winner: (Netherlands) Cheryl Maas
    - Men's Slopestyle winner: (Canada) Michael Ciccarelli
    - Women's Slopestyle winner: (Netherlands) Cheryl Maas
  - February 25 – March 1: World Cup #4 in (United States) Park City, Utah
    - Men's Slopestyle winner: (United States) Eric Willett
    - Women's Slopestyle winner: (Netherlands) Cheryl Maas
    - Men's Half-pipe winner: (China) Zhang Yiwei
    - Women's Half-pipe winner: (United States) Kelly Clark
  - March 13 & 14: World Cup #5 (final) in (Czech Republic) Špindlerův Mlýn
    - Men's Slopestyle winner: (Switzerland) Lucien Koch
    - Women's Slopestyle winner: (Netherlands) Cheryl Maas

=== Snowboard Cross ===
- March 13 – 21: 2014–15 Snowboard Cross Schedule
  - March 13 – 15: World Cup #1 in (Switzerland) Veysonnaz
    - Men's winner #1: (Spain) Lucas Eguibar
    - Women's winner #1: (Italy) Michela Moioli
    - Men's winner #2: (Australia) Alex Pullin
    - Women's winner #2: (Canada) Dominique Maltais
  - March 20 & 21: World Cup #2 (final) in (Spain) La Molina
    - Men's winner: (Canada) Chris Robanske
    - Women's winner: (France) Charlotte Bankes

=== Alpine snowboarding ===
- December 16, 2014 – March 14, 2015: 2014–15 Alpine Snowboarding Schedule
  - December 16, 2014: World Cup #1 in (Italy) Carezza
    - Men's Parallel giant slalom winner: (Italy) Roland Fischnaller
    - Women's Parallel giant slalom winner: (Austria) Marion Kreiner
  - December 18 & 19: World Cup #2 in (Austria) Montafon
    - Men's Parallel slalom winner: (Italy) Roland Fischnaller
    - Women's Parallel slalom winner: (Austria) Sabine Schoeffmann
  - January 9 & 10: World Cup #3 in (Austria) Bad Gastein
    - Men's Parallel slalom winner: (Slovenia) Žan Košir
    - Women's Parallel slalom winner: (Czech Republic) Ester Ledecká
    - Mixed Parallel slalom team winners: (Russia) Svetlana Boldykova / Valery Kolegov
  - January 31: World Cup #4 in (Slovenia) Rogla
    - Men's Parallel giant slalom winner: (Russia) Vic Wild
    - Women's Parallel giant slalom winner: (Austria) Marion Kreiner
  - February 6 & 7: World Cup #5 in (Germany) Sudelfeld
    - Men's Parallel giant slalom winner: (Russia) Andrey Sobolev
    - Women's Parallel giant slalom winner: (Czech Republic) Ester Ledecká
  - February 28 & March 1: World Cup #6 in (Japan) Asahikawa, Hokkaido
    - Men's Parallel giant slalom winner: (Slovenia) Žan Košir
    - Women's Parallel giant slalom winner: (Austria) Julia Dujmovits
    - Men's Parallel slalom winner: (Slovenia) Žan Košir
    - Women's Parallel slalom winner: (Switzerland) Julie Zogg
  - March 7: World Cup #7 in (Russia) Moscow
    - Men's Parallel slalom winner: (United States) Justin Reiter
    - Women's Parallel slalom winner: (Austria) Claudia Riegler
  - March 14: World Cup #8 (final) in (Germany) Winterberg
    - Men's Parallel slalom winner: (Italy) Roland Fischnaller
    - Women's Parallel slalom winner: (Norway) Hilde-Katrine Engeli

=== World snowboarding championships ===
- January 15 – 25: FIS Freestyle Ski and Snowboarding World Championships 2015 in (Austria) Kreischberg
- Note: This championship is paired with the FIS Freestyle World Ski Championships 2015 together.
  - Men's Big Air winner: (Finland) Roope Tonteri
  - Women's Big Air winner: (Switzerland) Elena Könz
  - Men's Half-pipe winner: (Australia) Scott James
  - Women's Half-pipe winner: (China) Cai Xuetong
  - Men's Snowboard cross winner: (Italy) Luca Matteotti
  - Women's Snowboard cross winner: (United States) Lindsay Jacobellis
  - Men's Slopestyle winner: (United States) Ryan Stassel
  - Women's Slopestyle winner: (Japan) Miyabi Onitsuka
  - Men's Parallel slalom winner: (Italy) Roland Fischnaller
  - Women's Parallel slalom winner: (Czech Republic) Ester Ledecká
  - Men's Parallel giant slalom winner: (Russia) Andrey Sobolev
  - Women's Parallel giant slalom winner: (Austria) Claudia Riegler
- February 23 – 28: 2015 IPC Para-Snowboard World Championships in (Spain) La Molina (Barcelona)
  - For results, click here.
- March 9 – 15: Snowboarding FIS Junior World Championships 2015 in (China) Yabuli
  - Men's Junior Parallel giant slalom winner: (South Korea) Lee Sang-ho
  - Women's Junior Parallel giant slalom winner: (Russia) Natalia Soboleva
  - Men's Junior Slopestyle winner: (Netherlands) Erik Bastiaansen
  - Women's Junior Slopestyle winner: (United States) Nora Healey
  - Men's Junior Parallel slalom winner: (Russia) Vladislav Shkurikhin
  - Women's Junior Parallel slalom winner: (Russia) Natalia Soboleva
  - Men's Junior Half-pipe winner: (South Korea) Kweon Lee-jun
  - Women's Junior Half-pipe winner: (United States) Madison Taylor Barrett
  - Men's Junior Snowboard Cross winner: (Russia) Daniil Dilman
  - Women's Junior Snowboard Cross winner: (France) Charlotte Bankes
  - Men's Junior Team Snowboard Cross winners: (Australia) Matthew Thomas / Adam Lambert
  - Women's Junior Team Snowboard Cross winners: (France) Juliette Lefevre / Charlotte Bankes
