= FIS Freestyle Ski and Snowboarding World Championships 2015 – Women's big air =

The women's snowboard big air competition of the FIS Freestyle Ski and Snowboarding World Championships 2015 was held at Kreischberg, Austria on January 23 (qualifying) and January 24 (finals). 15 athletes from 9 countries competed.

== Qualification ==
The following are the results of the qualification.

Rank	Bib	Name	Country	Run 1	Run 2	Best	Notes
1	19	Lia-Mara Bösch	Switzerland	70.25	92.25	92.25	Q
2	24	Urška Pribošič	Slovenia	87.25	49.50	87.25	Q
3	17	Elena Könz	Switzerland	81.25	41.75	81.25	Q
4	11	Sina Candrian	Switzerland	74.75	36.50	74.75	Q
5	14	Klaudia Medlová	Slovakia	74.00	54.25	74.00	Q
6	22	Merika Enne	Finland	69.75	71.50	71.50	Q
7	21	Loranne Smans	Belgium	66.75	20.00	66.75	
8	18	Jessika Jenson	United States	64.25	38.75	64.25	
9	25	Ella Suitiala	Finland	17.50	63.00	63.00	
10	13	María Hidalgo	Spain	61.50	15.75	61.50	
11	12	Silvia Mittermüller	Germany	54.50	25.25	54.50	
12	15	Kristiina Nisula	Finland	34.75	16.25	34.75	
13	20	Karly Shorr	United States	18.75	15.00	18.75	
14	16	Ty Walker	United States	16.75	16.50	16.75	
15	23	Lea Jugovac	Croatia	11.75	8.25	11.75	

== Final ==
The following are the results of the finals.

Rank	Bib	Name	Country	Run 1	Run 2	Run 3	2 Best
1st place, gold medalist(s)	3	Elena Könz	Switzerland	85.50	72.25	27.00	157.75
2nd place, silver medalist(s)	6	Merika Enne	Finland	JNS	80.50	68.25	148.75
3rd place, bronze medalist(s)	4	Sina Candrian	Switzerland	76.75	66.50	JNS	143.25
4	5	Klaudia Medlová	Slovakia	62.00	JNS	74.75	136.75
5	1	Lia-Mara Bösch	Switzerland	JNS	44.50	82.00	126.50
6	2	Urška Pribošič	Slovenia	33.75	JNS	29.75	63.50
