= FIS Freestyle Ski and Snowboarding World Championships 2019 – Women's snowboard big air =

Women's snowboard big air at the FIS Freestyle Ski and Snowboarding World Championships 2019
- Venue: Park City Mountain Resort
- Location: Utah, United States
- Dates: February 5–6
- Competitors: 26 from 16 nations

The Women's snowboard big air competition at the FIS Freestyle Ski and Snowboarding World Championships 2019 was scheduled to be held on February 5 and 6, 2019. Due to bad weather conditions, the competition was cancelled.

== Qualification ==
Rank	Bib	Name	Country	Run 1	Run 2	Best	Notes
	1	Enni Rukajärvi	Finland				
	2	Isabel Derungs	Switzerland				
	3	Silje Norendal	Norway				
	4	Zoi Sadowski-Synnott	New Zealand				
	5	Julia Marino	United States				
	6	Reira Iwabuchi	Japan				
	7	Laurie Blouin	Canada				
	8	Jamie Anderson	United States				
	9	Sina Candrian	Switzerland				
	10	Miyabi Onitsuka	Japan				
	11	Cheryl Maas	Netherlands				
	12	Loranne Smans	Belgium				
	13	Klaudia Medlová	Slovakia				
	14	Jade Thurgood	United States				
	15	Urška Pribošič	Slovenia				
	16	Jasmine Baird	Canada				
	17	Zhang Tong	China				
	18	Li Dongyu	China				
	19	Nadja Flemming	Germany				
	20	Antonia Yañez	Chile				
	21	Christy Prior	New Zealand				
	22	Sommer Gendron	Canada				
	23	Ekaterina Kosova	Russia				
	24	Hailey Langland	United States				
	25	Brooke Voigt	Canada				
	26	Šárka Pančochová	Czech Republic				
