= 2014–15 FIS Snowboard World Cup =

Snowboarding championship season

Snowboard World Cup 2014/15
| Discipline | Men | Women |
| Parallel overall | (Slovenia) Žan Košir | (Switzerland) Julie Zogg |
| Parallel giant slalom | (Slovenia) Žan Košir | (Austria) Marion Kreiner |
| Parallel slalom | (Slovenia) Žan Košir | (Switzerland) Julie Zogg |
| Freestyle overall | (Finland) Janne Korpi | (Netherlands) Cheryl Maas |
| Snowboard cross | (Spain) Lucas Eguibar | (France) Nelly Moenne Loccoz |
| Halfpipe | (United States) Taylor Gold (China) Zhang Yiwei | (United States) Kelly Clark |
| Slopestyle | (Finland) Janne Korpi | (Netherlands) Cheryl Maas |
| Big Air | (Canada) Darcy Sharpe (Belgium) Seppe Smits | (Netherlands) Cheryl Maas |

Competition
| Locations | 16 | 16 |
| Individual | 19 | 19 |
| Team | 2 | 2 |

The 2014–15 FIS Snowboard World Cup was the 21st edition of the FIS Snowboard World Cup, organised by International Ski Federation. The FIS Snowboarding World Cup consisted of the parallel slalom, parallel giant slalom, snowboard cross, halfpipe, slopestyle and big air.

== Calendar: Men ==
=== Parallel ===
| Date | Place | Event | Winner | Second | Third | Det. |
| 16 Dec 2014 | (Italy) Carezza | PGS | (Italy) Roland Fischnaller | (Slovenia) Žan Košir | (Canada) Jasey-Jay Anderson |
| 18 Dec 2014 | (Austria) Montafon | PSL | (Italy) Roland Fischnaller | (Slovenia) Žan Košir | (Italy) Mirko Felicetti |
| 9 Jan 2015 | (Austria) Bad Gastein | PSL | (Slovenia) Žan Košir | (Italy) Christoph Mick | (Germany) Patrick Bussler |
| 31 Jan 2015 | (Slovenia) Rogla | PGS | (Russia) Vic Wild | (Italy) Mirko Felicetti | (Slovenia) Žan Košir |
| 7 Feb 2015 | (Germany) Sudelfeld | PGS | (Russia) Andrey Sobolev | (Russia) Vic Wild | (Slovenia) Žan Košir |
| 28 Feb 2015 | (Japan) Asahikawa | PGS | (Slovenia) Žan Košir | (Germany) Patrick Bussler | (Russia) Stanislav Detkov |
| 1 Mar 2015 | (Japan) Asahikawa | PSL | (Slovenia) Žan Košir | (United States) Justin Reiter | (Italy) Mirko Felicetti |
| 7 Mar 2015 | (Russia) Moscow | PSL | (United States) Justin Reiter | (Austria) Benjamin Karl | (Italy) Roland Fischnaller |
| 14 Mar 2015 | (Germany) Winterberg | PSL | (Italy) Roland Fischnaller | (Austria) Benjamin Karl | (Russia) Konstantin Shipilov |

=== Snowboard Cross ===
| Date | Place | Event | Winner | Second | Third | Det. |
| 18 Dec 2014 | (Austria) Montafon | SBX | Cancelled due to insufficient snow |
| 7 Mar 2015 | (United States) Squaw Valley | SBX | Cancelled |
| 14 Mar 2015 | (Switzerland) Veysonnaz | SBX | (Spain) Lucas Eguibar | (Russia) Nikolay Olyunin | (Canada) Kevin Hill |
| 15 Mar 2015 | (Switzerland) Veysonnaz | SBX | (Australia) Alex Pullin | (Spain) Lucas Eguibar | (Canada) Kevin Hill |
| 21 Mar 2015 | (Spain) La Molina | SBX | (Canada) Chris Robanske | (United States) Alex Deibold | (Australia) Alex Pullin |

=== Big Air ===
| Date | Place | Event | Winner | Second | Third | Det. |
| 20 Dec 2014 | (Turkey) Istanbul | BA | (Belgium) Seppe Smits | (Switzerland) Jonas Boesiger | (United States) Brandon Davis |
| 20 Feb 2015 | (Canada) Stoneham | BA | (Canada) Darcy Sharpe | (Canada) Tyler Nicholson | (United States) Eric Beauchemin |

=== Slopestyle ===
| Date | Place | Event | Winner | Second | Third | Det. |
| 21 Feb 2015 | (Canada) Stoneham | SBS | (Canada) Michael Ciccarelli | (Finland) Janne Korpi | (Japan) Keita Inamura |
| 27 Feb 2015 | (United States) Park City | SBS | (United States) Eric Willett | (United States) Chas Guldemond | (United States) Eric Beauchemin |
| 14 Mar 2015 | (Czech Republic) Špindlerův Mlýn | SBS | (Switzerland) Lucien Koch | (Finland) Janne Korpi | (Finland) Petja Piiroinen |

=== Halfpipe ===
| Date | Place | Event | Winner | Second | Third | Det. |
| 6 Dec 2014 | (United States) Copper Mountain | HP | (United States) Taylor Gold | (China) Zhang Yiwei | (United States) Ben Ferguson |
| 22 Feb 2015 | (Canada) Stoneham | HP | Cancelled |
| 1 Mar 2015 | (United States) Park City | HP | (China) Zhang Yiwei | (United States) Taylor Gold | (Australia) Kent Callister |

== Calendar: Ladies ==
=== Parallel ===
| Date | Place | Event | Winner | Second | Third | Det. |
| 16 Dec 2014 | (Italy) Carezza | PGS | (Austria) Marion Kreiner | (Canada) Caroline Calvé | (Italy) Nadya Ochner |
| 18 Dec 2014 | (Austria) Montafon | PSL | (Austria) Sabine Schöffmann | (Germany) Amelie Kober | (Russia) Alena Zavarzina |
| 9 Jan 2015 | (Austria) Bad Gastein | PSL | (Czech Republic) Ester Ledecká | (Switzerland) Patrizia Kummer | (Switzerland) Julie Zogg |
| 31 Jan 2015 | (Slovenia) Rogla | PGS | (Austria) Marion Kreiner | (Austria) Ina Meschik | (Germany) Selina Jörg |
| 7 Feb 2015 | (Germany) Sudelfeld | PGS | (Czech Republic) Ester Ledecká | (Switzerland) Julie Zogg | (Austria) Marion Kreiner |
| 28 Feb 2015 | (Japan) Asahikawa | PGS | (Austria) Julia Dujmovits | (Switzerland) Julie Zogg | (Czech Republic) Ester Ledecká |
| 1 Mar 2015 | (Japan) Asahikawa | PSL | (Switzerland) Julie Zogg | (Austria) Sabine Schöffmann | (Austria) Julia Dujmovits |
| 7 Mar 2015 | (Russia) Moscow | PSL | (Austria) Claudia Riegler | (Switzerland) Julie Zogg | (Switzerland) Patrizia Kummer |
| 14 Mar 2015 | (Germany) Winterberg | PSL | (Norway) Hilde-Katrine Engeli | (Germany) Selina Jörg | (Russia) Alena Zavarzina |

=== Snowboard Cross ===
| Date | Place | Event | Winner | Second | Third | Det. |
| 18 Dec 2014 | (Austria) Montafon | SBX | Cancelled due to insufficient snow |
| 7 Mar 2015 | (United States) Squaw Valley | SBX | Cancelled |
| 14 Mar 2015 | (Switzerland) Veysonnaz | SBX | (Italy) Michela Moioli | (France) Nelly Moenne Loccoz | (France) Chloé Trespeuch |
| 15 Mar 2015 | (Switzerland) Veysonnaz | SBX | (Canada) Dominique Maltais | (France) Nelly Moenne Loccoz | (France) Chloé Trespeuch |
| 21 Mar 2015 | (Spain) La Molina | SBX | (France) Charlotte Bankes | (France) Nelly Moenne Loccoz | (United States) Lindsey Jacobellis |

=== Big Air ===
| Date | Place | Event | Winner | Second | Third | Det. |
| 20 Dec 2014 | (Turkey) Istanbul | BA | (United States) Ty Walker | (Switzerland) Sina Candrian | (Netherlands) Cheryl Maas |
| 20 Feb 2015 | (Canada) Stoneham | BA | (Netherlands) Cheryl Maas | (Switzerland) Lia-Mara Boesch | (Slovakia) Klaudia Medlová |

=== Slopestyle ===
| Date | Place | Event | Winner | Second | Third | Det. |
| 21 Feb 2015 | (Canada) Stoneham | SBS | (Netherlands) Cheryl Maas | (United States) Jessika Jenson | (Slovakia) Klaudia Medlová |
| 27 Feb 2015 | (United States) Park City | SBS | (Netherlands) Cheryl Maas | (United States) Karly Shorr | (Switzerland) Elena Könz |
| 14 Mar 2015 | (Czech Republic) Špindlerův Mlýn | SBS | (Netherlands) Cheryl Maas | (Slovakia) Klaudia Medlová | (Finland) Ella Suitiala |

=== Halfpipe ===
| Date | Place | Event | Winner | Second | Third | Det. |
| 6 Dec 2014 | (United States) Copper Mountain | HP | (United States) Kelly Clark | (United States) Arielle Gold | (United States) Hannah Teter |
| 22 Feb 2015 | (Canada) Stoneham | HP | Cancelled |
| 1 Mar 2015 | (United States) Park City | HP | (United States) Kelly Clark | (United States) Arielle Gold | (China) Cai Xuetong |

== Calendar: Team events ==
| Date | Place | Event | Winner | Second | Third | Det. |
| 18 Dec 2014 | (Austria) Montafon | SBX | Cancelled due to insufficient snow |
| 19 Dec 2014 | (Austria) Montafon | PSL | Italy I Nadya Ochner; Roland Fischnaller | Russia II Natalia Soboleva; Andrey Sobolev | Japan I Tomoka Takeuchi; Masaki Shiba |
| 10 Jan 2015 | (Austria) Bad Gastein | PSL | Switzerland I Patrizia Kummer; Nevin Galmarini | Russia V Svetlana Boldykova; Valery Kolegov | Russia II Natalia Soboleva; Andrey Sobolev |
| 7 Mar 2015 | (United States) Squaw Valley | SBX | Cancelled |

== Standings: Men ==
=== Parallel overall (PGS/PSL) ===
| Rank | | Points |
|---|---|---|
| 1 | (Slovenia) Žan Košir | 6250 |
| 2 | (Italy) Roland Fischnaller | 4588 |
| 3 | (United States) Justin Reiter | 3680 |
| 4 | (Russia) Andrey Sobolev | 3490 |
| 5 | (Austria) Benjamin Karl | 3452 |

- Standings after 9 races.

=== Parallel slalom ===
| Rank | | Points |
|---|---|---|
| 1 | (Slovenia) Žan Košir | 3250 |
| 2 | (Italy) Roland Fischnaller | 3180 |
| 3 | (Austria) Benjamin Karl | 2660 |
| 4 | (United States) Justin Reiter | 2370 |
| 5 | (Russia) Andrey Sobolev | 1770 |

- Standings after 5 races.

=== Parallel giant slalom ===
| Rank | | Points |
|---|---|---|
| 1 | (Slovenia) Žan Košir | 3000 |
| 2 | (Russia) Vic Wild | 2139 |
| 3 | (Russia) Andrey Sobolev | 1720 |
| 4 | (Italy) Roland Fischnaller | 1408 |
| 5 | (Germany) Alexander Bergmann | 1370 |

- Standings after 4 races.

=== Snowboard Cross ===
| Rank | | Points |
|---|---|---|
| 1 | (Spain) Lucas Eguibar | 2090 |
| 2 | (Australia) Alex Pullin | 1700 |
| 3 | (Russia) Nikolay Olyunin | 1560 |
| 4 | (Canada) Kevin Hill | 1360 |
| 5 | (Canada) Chris Robanske | 1000 |

- Standings after 3 races.

=== Nations Cup ===
| Rank | | Points |
|---|---|---|
| 1 | United States | 16986 |
| 2 | Italy | 15676 |
| 3 | Russia | 12996 |
| 4 | Austria | 12899 |
| 5 | Slovenia | 12271 |

- Standings after 21 races.

=== Freestyle overall (SBS/BA/HP) ===
| Rank | | Points |
|---|---|---|
| 1 | (Finland) Janne Korpi | 2940 |
| 2 | (Finland) Petja Piiroinen | 1820 |
| 3 | (United States) Taylor Gold | 1800 |
| 3 | (China) Yiwei Zhang | 1800 |
| 5 | (Belgium) Sebbe De Buck | 1550 |

- Standings after 7 races.

=== Slopestyle ===
| Rank | | Points |
|---|---|---|
| 1 | (Finland) Janne Korpi | 2100 |
| 2 | (Finland) Petja Piiroinen | 1050 |
| 3 | (Canada) Michael Ciccarelli | 1000 |
| 3 | (Switzerland) Lucien Koch | 1000 |
| 3 | (United States) Eric Willett | 1000 |

- Standings after 3 races.

=== Big Air ===
| Rank | | Points |
|---|---|---|
| 1 | (Canada) Darcy Sharpe | 1000 |
| 1 | (Belgium) Seppe Smits | 1000 |
| 3 | (Switzerland) Jonas Boesiger | 800 |
| 3 | (Canada) Tyler Nicholson | 800 |
| 5 | (Finland) Petja Piiroinen | 770 |

- Standings after 2 races.

=== Halfpipe ===
| Rank | | Points |
|---|---|---|
| 1 | (United States) Taylor Gold | 1800 |
| 1 | (China) Yiwei Zhang | 1800 |
| 3 | (United States) Greg Bretz | 860 |
| 4 | (Australia) Kent Callister | 780 |
| 5 | (United States) Jake Pates | 620 |

- Standings after 2 races.

== Standings: Ladies ==
=== Parallel overall (PGS/PSL) ===
| Rank | | Points |
|---|---|---|
| 1 | (Switzerland) Julie Zogg | 4740 |
| 2 | (Austria) Marion Kreiner | 4470 |
| 3 | (Czech Republic) Ester Ledecka | 3900 |
| 4 | (Austria) Sabine Schöffmann | 3760 |
| 5 | (Austria) Julia Dujmovits | 3586 |

- Standings after 9 races.

=== Parallel slalom ===
| Rank | | Points |
|---|---|---|
| 1 | (Switzerland) Julie Zogg | 2950 |
| 2 | (Austria) Sabine Schöffmann | 2610 |
| 3 | (Norway) Hilde-Katrine Engeli | 2050 |
| 4 | (Switzerland) Patrizia Kummer | 2040 |
| 5 | (Austria) Claudia Riegler | 2030 |

- Standings after 5 races.

=== Parallel giant slalom ===
| Rank | | Points |
|---|---|---|
| 1 | (Austria) Marion Kreiner | 3000 |
| 2 | (Czech Republic) Ester Ledecka | 2050 |
| 3 | (Switzerland) Julie Zogg | 1790 |
| 4 | (Japan) Tomoka Takeuchi | 1690 |
| 5 | (Austria) Julia Dujmovits | 1646 |

- Standings after 4 races.

=== Snowboard Cross ===
| Rank | | Points |
|---|---|---|
| 1 | (France) Nelly Moenne Loccoz | 2400 |
| 2 | (Canada) Dominique Maltais | 1900 |
| 3 | (Italy) Michela Moioli | 1900 |
| 4 | (France) Chloe Trespeuch | 1400 |
| 5 | (Australia) Belle Brockhoff | 1300 |

- Standings after 3 races.

=== Nations Cup ===
| Rank | | Points |
|---|---|---|
| 1 | Switzerland | 17820 |
| 2 | Austria | 17556 |
| 3 | United States | 11670 |
| 4 | Canada | 10175 |
| 5 | Germany | 9099 |

- Standings after 21 races.

=== Freestyle overall (HP/BA/SS) ===
| Rank | | Points |
|---|---|---|
| 1 | (Netherlands) Cheryl Maas | 4600 |
| 2 | (Slovakia) Klaudia Medlová | 2560 |
| 3 | (United States) Kelly Clark | 2000 |
| 4 | (Finland) Ella Suitiala | 1710 |
| 5 | (United States) Ty Walker | 1650 |

- Standings after 7 races.

=== Slopestyle ===
| Rank | | Points |
|---|---|---|
| 1 | (Netherlands) Cheryl Maas | 3000 |
| 2 | (Slovakia) Klaudia Medlová | 1640 |
| 3 | (Finland) Ella Suitiala | 1190 |
| 4 | (United States) Karly Shorr | 1160 |
| 5 | (Switzerland) Elena Koenz | 1100 |

- Standings after 3 races.

=== Big Air ===
| Rank | | Points |
|---|---|---|
| 1 | (Netherlands) Cheryl Maas | 1600 |
| 2 | (United States) Ty Walker | 1180 |
| 3 | (Slovakia) Klaudia Medlová | 920 |
| 4 | (Switzerland) Lia-Mara Boesch | 800 |
| 4 | (Switzerland) Sina Candrian | 800 |

- Standings after 2 races.

=== Halfpipe ===
| Rank | | Points |
|---|---|---|
| 1 | (United States) Kelly Clark | 2000 |
| 2 | (United States) Arielle Gold | 1600 |
| 3 | (China) Xuetong Cai | 1100 |
| 4 | (United States) Hannah Teter | 820 |
| 5 | (France) Clemence Grimal | 810 |

- Standings after 2 races.

== Podium table by nation ==
| Rank | Nation | Gold | Silver | Bronze | Total |
|---|---|---|---|---|---|
| 1 | United States | 6 | 8 | 6 | 20 |
| 2 | Austria | 5 | 4 | 2 | 11 |
| 3 | Italy | 5 | 2 | 4 | 11 |
| 4 | Canada | 4 | 2 | 3 | 9 |
| 5 | Netherlands | 4 | 0 | 1 | 5 |
| 6 | Switzerland | 3 | 7 | 3 | 13 |
| 7 | Slovenia | 3 | 2 | 2 | 7 |
| 8 | Russia | 2 | 4 | 5 | 11 |
| 9 | Czech Republic | 2 | 0 | 1 | 3 |
| 10 | France | 1 | 3 | 2 | 6 |
| 11 | China | 1 | 1 | 1 | 3 |
| 12 | Spain | 1 | 1 | 0 | 2 |
| 13 | Australia | 1 | 0 | 2 | 3 |
| 14 | Belgium | 1 | 0 | 0 | 1 |
| 14 | Norway | 1 | 0 | 0 | 1 |
| 16 | Germany | 0 | 3 | 2 | 5 |
| 17 | Finland | 0 | 2 | 2 | 4 |
| 18 | Slovakia | 0 | 1 | 2 | 3 |
| 19 | Japan | 0 | 0 | 2 | 2 |
| Totals (19 entries) | | 40 | 40 | 40 | 120 |
