= FIS Snowboarding World Championships 2011 – Women's slopestyle =

The women's slopestyle competition of the 2011 FIS Snowboarding World Championships was held in La Molina, Spain on January 22, 2011. 27 athletes from 15 countries competed.

== Results ==
=== Qualification ===
The following are the results of the qualification.

Rank	Bib	Name	Country	Run 1	Run 2	Best Score	Note
1	12	Enni Rukajärvi	Finland	26.5	27.9	27.9	Q
2	1	Šárka Pančochová	Czech Republic	25.3	14.7	25.3	Q
3	23	Merika Enne	Finland	5.6	21.2	21.2	Q
4	6	Allyson Carroll	United States	18.3	14.2	18.3	Q
5	16	Stefi Luxton	New Zealand	9.9	18.0	18.0	Q
6	20	Saana Pehkonen	Finland	17.5	8.8	17.5	Q
7	25	Charlotte Van Gils	Netherlands	15.4	17.4	17.4	Q
8	4	Klaudia Medlova	Slovakia	4.3	17.3	17.3	Q
9	3	Shelly Gotlieb	New Zealand	16.1	17.1	17.1	Q
10	24	Kendall Brown	New Zealand	10.2	16.3	16.3	
11	9	Pia Muesburger	Austria	12.9	15.2	15.2	
12	10	Faye Gulini	United States	11.5	15.1	15.1	
13	8	Anja Stefan	Croatia	2.2	14.9	14.9	
14	11	Samm Denena	Canada	14.7	11.3	14.7	
15	22	Mimmi Sandstrom	Sweden	4.2	10.4	10.4	
16	2	Marta Jekot	South Africa	9.8	9.4	9.8	
17	14	Alexandra Duckworth	Canada	6.4	8.5	8.5	
18	15	Lou Chabelard	France	5.2	7.6	7.6	
19	5	Diane Rudge	Canada	5.7	7.2	7.2	
20	17	Cecilia Larsen	Sweden	6.2	DNS	6.2	
21	21	Tiina Lindstrom	Finland	2.4	4.8	4.8	
22	26	Rebecca Sinclair	New Zealand	1.5	DNS	1.5	
	7	Mirabelle Thovex	France			DNS	
	13	Cilka Sadar	Slovenia			DNS	
	18	Silvia Mittermueller	Germany			DNS	
	19	Helene Olafsen	Norway			DNS	
	27	Marie-Andree Racine	Canada			DNS	

=== Final ===
Rank	Bib	Name	Country	Run 1	Run 2	Best Score	Notes
1st place, gold medalist(s)	12	Enni Rukajärvi	Finland	26.6	28.2	28.2	
2nd place, silver medalist(s)	1	Šárka Pančochová	Czech Republic	23.2	25.2	25.2	
3rd place, bronze medalist(s)	3	Shelly Gotlieb	New Zealand	21.6	5.8	21.6	
4	23	Merika Enne	Finland	20.5	8.9	20.5	
5	6	Allyson Carroll	United States	12.6	18.5	18.5	
6	20	Saana Pehkonen	Finland	8.1	16.2	16.2	
7	16	Stefi Luxton	New Zealand	14.9	12.5	14.9	
8	4	Klaudia Medlova	Slovakia	13.0	5.3	13.0	
9	25	Charlotte Van Gils	Netherlands	8.7	12.1	12.1	
