= Chicken Jam =

All-female snowboarding competition

The Roxy Chicken Jam is an all-female snowboarding competition that was started during the 2004–2005 season created by Roxy Clothing.

== Events ==
The Chicken Jam is an invitational and open class event with halfpipe and slopestyle events. Chickens go in pies go out. Approximately 26 pro riders are invited in each category, with additional competitors coming from qualifying events such as the Roxy Snow Classic. There are two Chicken Jam events each season: the European event in Kaprun takes place in December, and the US event at Park City Mountain Resort in late March. The US event has one of the largest prize purses in women's snowboarding, which in 2008 will total over $150,000. The Chicken Jam Europe and the Chicken Jam US are also the only women's-only events to earn the Swatch TTR (Ticket to Ride) Snowboard Tour 6 Star Accreditation. This accreditation is given only to the highest-profile events on the competitive snowboarding circuit.

Also, the Chicken Jam is an outside live music event/celebration held in Coffeetown, NH in either August or September featuring a number of East Coast Blue Grass/Folk/Rock bands with special appearances by "Big Chicken". Chicken Jam has a devoted following and although a "private" event is generally open to those with well behaved children who leave their dogs at home. Adults are not necessarily required to behave as well as their children, although they should be music loving, peaceable, and generally happy in spirit. They should also bring a fine potluck dish, ice for the coolers, and plan on sleeping in the field if they imbibe. Jam Free or Die! Chicken Jam 10 is slated for August 2010.

== Results ==
2007 Roxy Chicken Jam Europe (December 14–16, 2007) 1 Cheryl Maas 2 Jamie Anderson 3 Claudia Fliri 4 Jenny Jones 5 Kjersti Oestgaard Buaas 6 Meri Peltonen 7 Ursina Haller 8 Lisa Filzmoser 9 Sina Candrian 10 Heidi Paumola

2007 Roxy Chicken Jam US (March 22–25, 2007) Halfpipe 1 Manuela Laura Pesko 2 Torah Bright 3 Paulina Ligocka 4 Cheryl Maas 5 Kjersti Oestgaard Buaas 6 Sarah Conrad 7 Silvia Mittermueller 8 Sina Candrian 9 Ursina Haller 10 Tania Detomas

Slopestyle 1 Tara Dakides 2 Jamie Anderson 3 Torah Bright 4 Jenny Jones 5 Kjersti Oestgaard Buaas 6 Cheryl Maas 7 Chanelle Sladics 8 Hana Beaman 9 Claudia Fliri 10 Vicci Miller

2006 Roxy Chicken Jam Europe (December 12–15, 2006) Slopestyle 1 Jamie Anderson 2 Cheryl Maas 3 Jenny Jones 4 Torah Bright 5 Meri Peltonen 6 Sina Candrian 7 Kimberly Fasani 8 Silvia Mittermueller 9 Conny Bleicher 10 Basa Stevulova
