= Justin Reiter =

American snowboarder (born 1981)

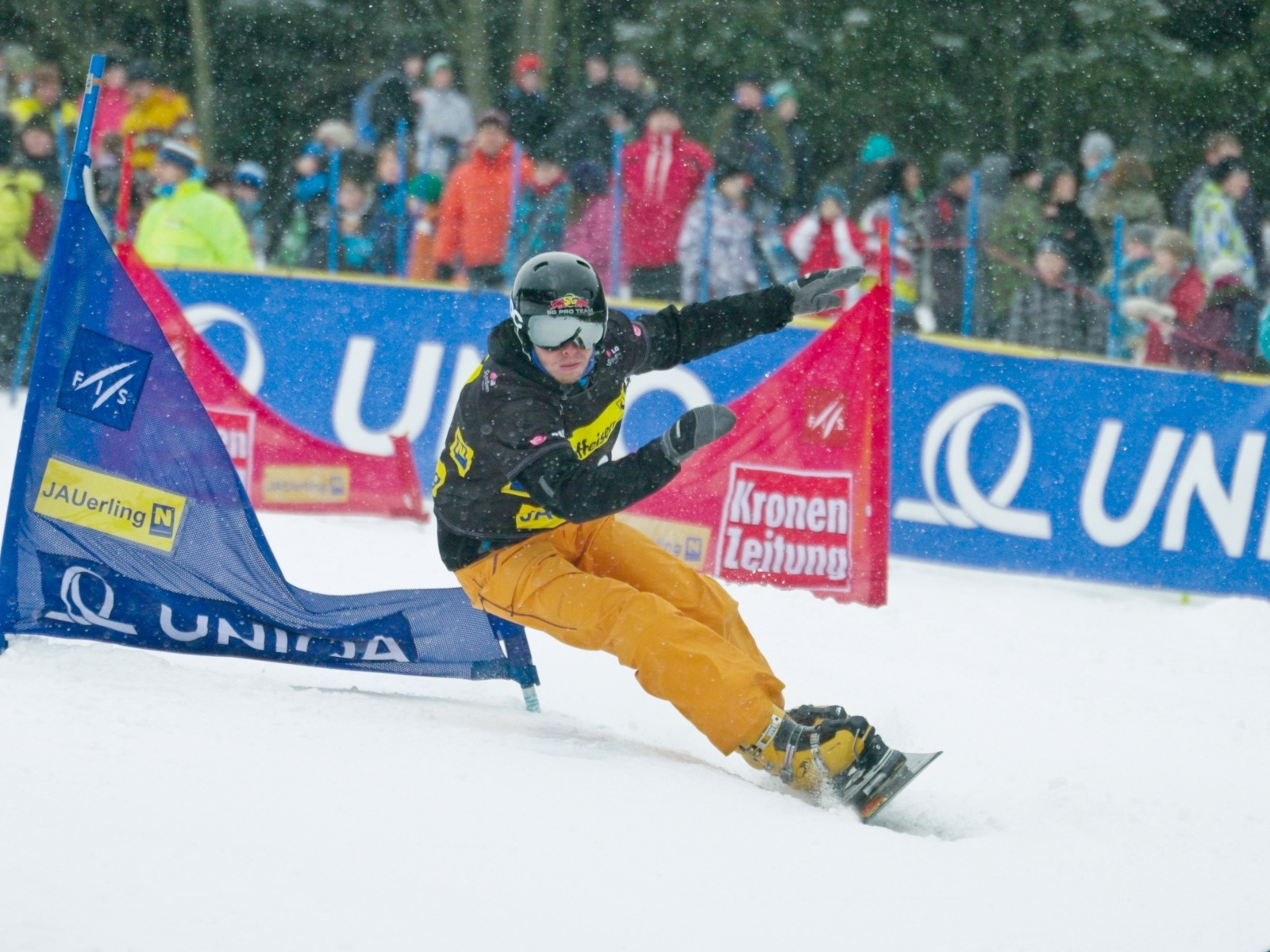

Medal record

Representing the United States

Men's Snowboarding

World Championships
Silver medal – second place	2013 Stoneham	Parallel slalom

Justin Reiter (born February 2, 1981) is an American snowboard coach and former snowboarder. He won a silver medal in the parallel slalom at the 2013 FIS Snowboarding World Championships. He is also a ten-time national champion and was selected for the 2014 Winter Olympics, where he was the only American male to compete in the parallel slalom and parallel giant slalom. He had 100 starts in the FIS Snowboard World Cup and scored four podium finishes, including one win in Moscow in 2015 - the first win by an American in a parallel competition for a decade. Reiter also finished third in the overall parallel standings for the 2014-15 season. In 2016 he filed suit against the International Olympic Committee in 2016 to save parallel slalom, which had been dropped from the 2018 Pyeongchang Olympic program. In September 2017 he announced his retirement. Subsequently he took up coaching: among the snowboarders he trains are Michael Trapp, Robby Burns and Ester Ledecká.
