= Isabel Derungs =

Swiss snowboarder (born 1987)

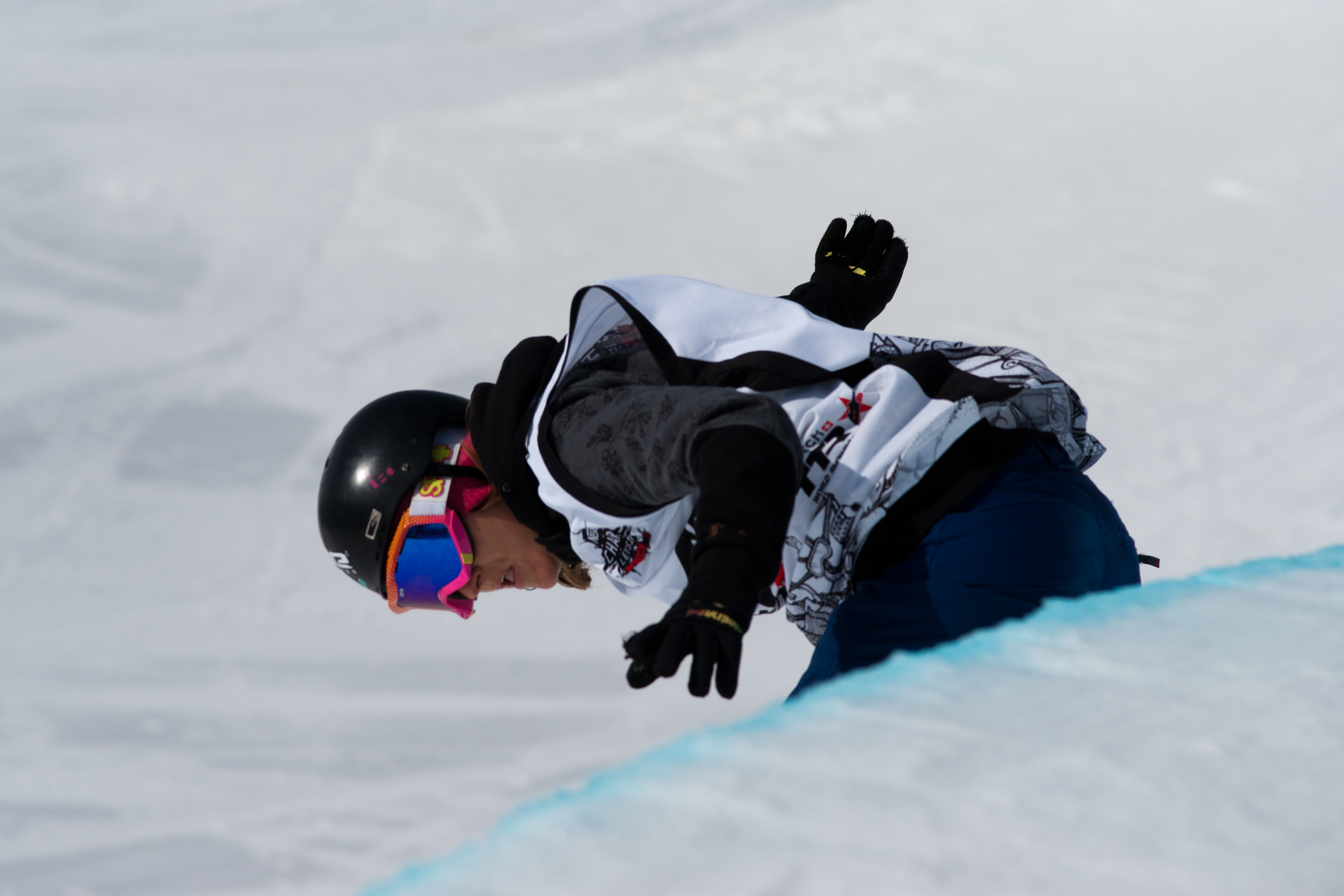
- Derungs in 2011

Personal information
- Born: 17 July 1987 (age 38) Suraua, Switzerland
- Education: ETH Zurich (2012–present)
- Height: 5 ft 7 in (170 cm)
- Weight: 128 lb (58 kg)

Sport
- Country: Switzerland
- Sport: Snowboarding

Achievements and titles
- Olympic finals: 2018 2014

Isabel Derungs (born 17 July 1987) is a Swiss snowboarder, competing in slopestyle.

Derungs participated in the 2018 Winter Olympics in PyeongChang and became 18th in the ladies' slopestyle final. Four years earlier, she qualified for the 2014 Winter Olympics and showed the best result in her heat in the qualification round (the fourth best result in the qualification), directly qualifying for the final. In the final, she fell in both runs and was classified 8th.

As of 2012, Derungs was a student at ETH Zurich working on the master's degree in environmental sciences. Before 2011, she was playing football and made it to U-19 Swiss National Team. Then she switched to snowboard. At FIS Snowboarding World Championships 2013 Derungs finished 7th. Her best World Cup result finish before the 2014 Olympics was the second-place finish in Copper Mountain on 22 December 2013. Her only other podium finish was also in Copper Mountain on 11 January 2013.
