= Jenny Jones (snowboarder) =

British snowboarder (born 1980)

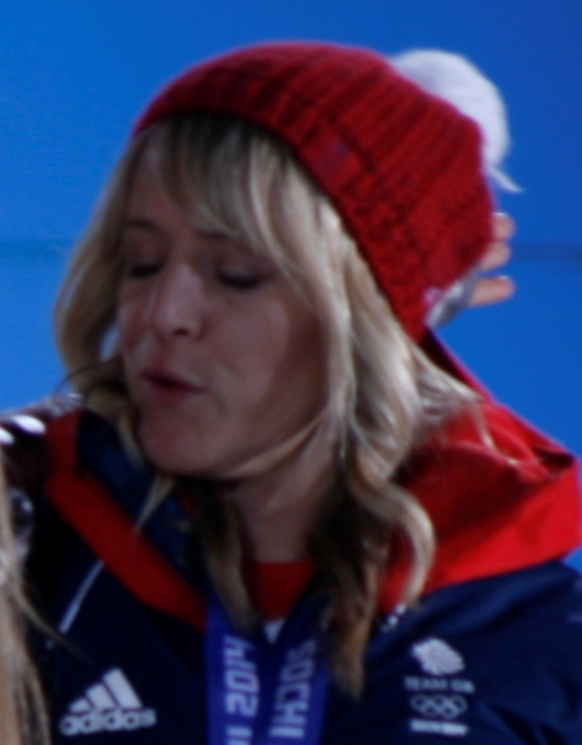
- Jenny Jones at the podium of the 2014 Winter Olympics in Sochi

Personal information
- Born: 3 July 1980 (age 45) Bristol, England
- Height: 5 ft 3 in (160 cm)
- Weight: 134 lb (61 kg)

Sport
- Country: Great Britain
- Sport: Snowboarding
- Event: Slopestyle

Achievements and titles
- Olympic finals: 2014 (3rd)
Medal record
Representing Great Britain
Olympic Games
| Bronze medal – third place | 2014 Sochi | Slopestyle |
Winter X Games
| Gold medal – first place | 2009 Aspen | Slopestyle |
| Gold medal – first place | 2010 Aspen | Slopestyle |
| Silver medal – second place | 2011 Aspen | Slopestyle |
Winter X Games Europe
| Gold medal – first place | 2010 Tignes | Slopestyle |
New Zealand Winter Games
| Silver medal – second place | 2013 Cardrona | Slopestyle |

Jenny Jones (born 3 July 1980) is a British professional snowboarder who became the first Briton to win an Olympic medal in a snow event after winning bronze in slopestyle at the 2014 Winter Olympics in Sochi.

== Early life ==
Jones was born in Downend, Bristol. She attended The Ridings High School, a large secondary school located in the village of Winterbourne in South Gloucestershire. Having competed in athletics (400m, long jump, cross country) and gymnastics at school, at age 17 she learnt to ski on the dry ski slope in Churchill, Somerset, after they offered free skiing lessons.

== Career ==
After leaving college Jones spent a season working as a chalet maid in Tignes, France, beginning a cycle of snowboarding in the winter and surfing in the summer in Devon and Cornwall, which she funded via part-time jobs including inspecting cardboard in a factory and teaching fencing to children.

Jones won the X Games USA Gold in 2009 and 2010, and the X Games Europe Gold in 2010. In August 2013 Jones scored her first podium finish in a round of the FIS Snowboard World Cup, winning a silver in slopestyle in the 2013–14 season opening meeting in New Zealand.

On 9 February 2014 she finished third behind Jamie Anderson and Enni Rukajärvi to win a bronze medal in the women's slopestyle event at the 2014 Winter Olympics in Sochi.

In recognition of her achievements for British Snowsports, the Ski Club of Great Britain awarded her the Pery Medal in 2014.

In October 2014 she started presenting Jenny Jones' Extreme, a monthly radio series for BBC Radio 5 Live showcasing extreme sports. In December 2014 she was announced as one of the coaches for the second series of Channel 4's celebrity winter sports competition The Jump.

As of 2022 she is retired from competition, and presents on BBC Ski Sunday while also holding snowboarding workshops. She also covered the 2022 Winter Olympics in Beijing for the BBC, acting as a reporter. For the Milano Cortina 2026 Games, Jones worked for the BBC, reporting on the snowboarding and skiing events live from Livigno Snow Park.
