= Molly Summerhayes =

British freestyle skier

Molly Summerhayes (born 7 June 1997) is an English freestyle skier who participated in the 2018 Winter Olympics. In December 2018, she announced her retirement aged 21, after learning that she would not receive funding.

She is from Sheffield, South Yorkshire and is the younger sister of Olympian skier Katie Summerhayes. The sisters first skied at the former Ski Village in Sheffield when they were aged four and six.
