= Shelly Gotlieb =

New Zealand snowboarder

Personal information
- Born: 28 July 1980 (age 45) Raetihi, New Zealand
- Height: 174 cm (5 ft 9 in)
- Weight: 64 kg (141 lb)

Sport
- Country: New Zealand
- Sport: Snowboarding
- Event: Women's slopestyle
Medal record
Representing New Zealand
FIS Snowboarding World Championships
Bronze medal – third place	2011 La Molina	Slopestyle
New Zealand Winter Games
Bronze medal – third place	2011 Cardrona	Big Air
- Updated on 7 February 2014

Shelly Gotlieb (born 28 July 1980) is a snowboarder from New Zealand. She won a bronze medal at the 2011 FIS Snowboarding World Championships in slopestyle.
