= Rebecca Torr =

New Zealand snowboarder (born 1990)

Personal information
- Born: 15 March 1990 (age 36) Tauranga, New Zealand
- Height: 1.73 m (5 ft 8 in)
- Weight: 65 kg (143 lb)

Sport
- Country: New Zealand
- Sport: Snowboarding
Medal record
New Zealand Winter Games
Bronze medal – third place	2011 Cardrona	SlopeStyle

Rebecca Torr (born 15 March 1990) is a snowboarder from New Zealand.

Born in Tauranga, she competed for New Zealand at the 2014 Winter Olympics in Sochi.
