= Spencer O'Brien =

Canadian snowboarder (born 1988)

Spencer O’Brien
Personal information
- Nationality: Canadian
- Born: February 2, 1988 (age 38) Alert Bay, British Columbia, Canada
- Height: 5 ft 7 in (170 cm)
- Weight: 150 lb (68 kg)

Sport
- Country: Canada
- Sport: Snowboarding
Medal record
Women's Snowboarding
Representing Canada
FIS Snowboarding World Championships
Gold medal – first place	2013 Stoneham	Slopestyle
Winter X Games
Gold medal – first place	2016 Aspen	SlopeStyle
Silver medal – second place	2009 Aspen	SlopeStyle
Bronze medal – third place	2008 Aspen	SlopeStyle
Bronze medal – third place	2013 Aspen	SlopeStyle
Bronze medal – third place	2014 Aspen	SlopeStyle

Spencer O’Brien (born February 2, 1988) is a Canadian snowboarder. She was born in Alert Bay, British Columbia, and is of Indigenous descent. She won the gold medal in slopestyle at the 2013 FIS Snowboarding World Championships.

O’Brien has also won five medals (one gold, one silver, three bronze) at the Winter X Games. She is one of only few Olympians coming from Canadian First Nations. She belongs to Haida and Kwakwaka’wakw in British Columbia.

Spencer O'Brien has been credited as one of the world's top female snowboarders. She has acquired this title by achieving prestigious feats, such as in 2012 when she was declared the champion of the World Snowboard Tour. A few weeks before the 2014 Winter Olympics in Sochi, Russia, O'Brien was diagnosed with rheumatoid arthritis (On Nov. 25, 2013). She came in last (12th place) during the Olympic event, yet she did not attribute this to her disease.

During the 2016–17 FIS Snowboard World Cup, O'Brien won the silver medal with a top-scoring run of 81.22 points, she is seen as an Olympic podium prospect for the 2018 Winter Olympics.

== Career ==
O'Brien grew up in the West Coast of Canada in Courtenay, BC a city on Vancouver Island. She started skiing when she was 2 years old, but then switched to snowboarding when she was 11. In 2008 O'Brien was voted Transworld's Rookie of the Year.

In 2017 Spencer won Bronze in the snowboarding slopestyle event at the Burton US Open in Vail, Colorado.

=== X Games ===
O'Brien has been a competitor for Women's slopestyle at the X Games since 2007. She has 5 X Games medals including 1 Gold which she has won in her 11th X Games appearance in 2016. In 2015 O'Brien became the first women to successfully land a Backside 900 trick in X Games competition.
