= Stefi Luxton =

New Zealand snowboarder (born 1991)

Personal information
- Born: 29 September 1991 (age 35) Auckland, New Zealand
- Home town: Wanaka / Breckenridge
- Height: 167 cm (5 ft 6 in)
- Weight: 53 kg (117 lb)

Sport
- Country: New Zealand
- Sport: Snowboarding
- Event: Women's slopestyle
- Now coaching: Jody Blatchley
- Updated on 7 February 2014

Stefi Luxton (born 29 September 1991) is a snowboarder from New Zealand.

Born in Auckland, she competed for New Zealand at the 2014 Winter Olympics in Sochi.
