= Ella Suitiala =

Finnish snowboarder

Personal information
- Born: 1 October 1989 (age 36) Espoo, Finland

Sport
- Sport: Skiing

World Cup career
- Indiv. podiums: 1

Ella Suitiala (born 1 October 1989 in Espoo) is a Finnish snowboarder, specializing in halfpipe.

Suitiala competed at the 2014 Winter Olympics for Finland. In the halfpipe, she finished 19th in the qualifying round, failing to advance.

Suitiala made her World Cup debut in December 2011. As of September 2014, she has one podium finish, winning a bronze medal at Ruka in 2011–12. Her best overall finish is 11th, in 2011–12.

== World Cup podiums ==
Date	Location	Rank	Event
17 December 2011	Ruka	3rd place, bronze medalist(s)	Halfpipe
