= Šárka Pančochová =

Czech snowboarder (born 1990)

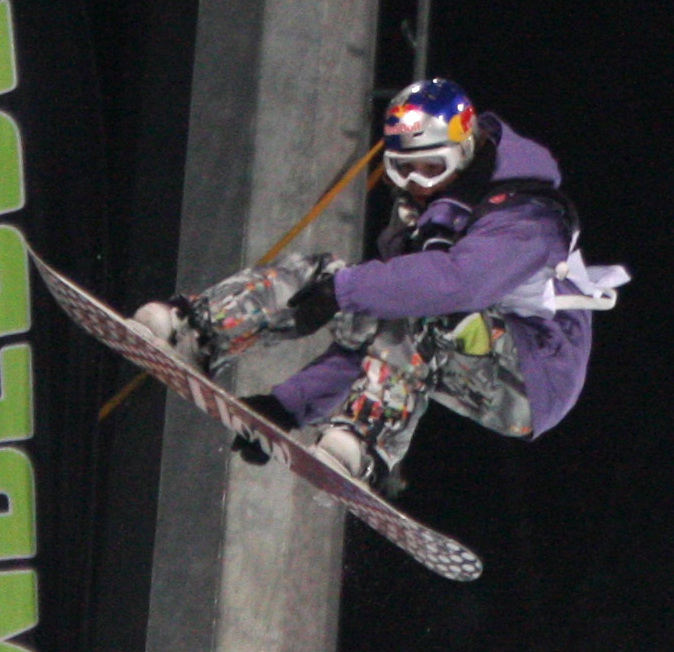

Personal information
- Born: 1 November 1990 (age 35) Uherské Hradiště, Czechoslovakia
- Height: 5 ft 3 in (160 cm)
- Weight: 121 lb (55 kg)

Sport
- Country: Czech Republic
- Sport: Snowboarding
- Event(s): Slopestyle, Half-pipe, Big air

Achievements and titles
- World finals: Silver medal in Slopestyle at La Molina 2011
- Highest world ranking: 1st in Snowboard Freestyle World Cup (2014); 1st in Snowboard Slopestyle World Cup (2014)
Medal record
Women's snowboarding
Representing Czech Republic
World Championships
Silver medal – second place	2011 La Molina	Slopestyle
Winter X Games
Silver medal – second place	2013 Aspen	SlopeStyle

Šárka Pančochová (Czech pronunciation: [ˈʃaːrka ˈpantʃoxovaː], born 1 November 1990) is a Czech snowboarder. She started snowboarding in 2002 at her local mountains in Moravia, Czech Republic.

== Career ==
Šárka got her first sponsor in the 2005/06 season. In 2007/2008 at the Swatch TTR World Snowboard Tour, Pančochová won the 3Star Quiksilver Snowjam and the Protest and O2 World Rookie fests. In the same season, she won the title of FIS Junior World Champion in Valmalenco, Italy.

In 2008/09, she won at the 4Star Horsefeathers Pleasure Jam in Austria and ended the season as World No. 8 on the TTR World Rankings.

In 2009/10, Pančochová followed the (Ticket to Ride (World Snowboard Tour)) and finished the season as World No. 3. Šárka had her first six-star podium moment at the Burton European Open, where she placed third in slopestyle.

At the 2010 Winter Olympics, she represented the Czech Republic and placed 14th in the halfpipe. Pančochová won a silver medal in slopestyle at the 2011 FIS Snowboarding World Championships.

In 2014, she qualified to the 2014 Winter Olympics. She competed in the Slopestyle competition and made the final. On her second run, she had one of the worst crashes of the competition cracking her helmet but wasn't injured. Her first-run score of 86.25 was enough for a fifth-place finish. She was taken to hospital for observation of possible concussion symptoms but was able to compete in Halfpipe several days later. She advanced to the semifinal round, and finished 10th in her semi.

== Personal life ==
Pančochová came out as gay in an interview with Outsports in 2017. She said she was "stoked" to discuss it publicly but also said it was "really not a big deal" anymore.

== Recent competition history ==
=== Highlights of Swatch TTR 2009/2010 Season ===
- 7th – Slopestyle – 5Star Burton New Zealand Open (Ticket to Ride (World Snowboard Tour))
- 3rd – Slopestyle – 6Star Burton European Open (Ticket to Ride (World Snowboard Tour))
- 2nd – Big Air – 3Star Billabong Bro Down (Ticket to Ride (World Snowboard Tour))
- 4th – Slopestyle – 6Star Roxy Chicken Jam Europe (Ticket to Ride (World Snowboard Tour))
- 5th – Slopestyle – 6Star Roxy Chicken Jam US (Ticket to Ride (World Snowboard Tour))

=== Highlights of Swatch TTR 2008/2009 Season ===
- 1st – Slopestyle – 4Star Horsefeathers Pleasure Jam (Ticket to Ride (World Snowboard Tour))
- 6th – Halfpipe – 6Star Burton European Open (Ticket to Ride (World Snowboard Tour))
- 6th – Slopestyle – 6Star Burton European Open (Ticket to Ride (World Snowboard Tour))

=== Career highlights ===
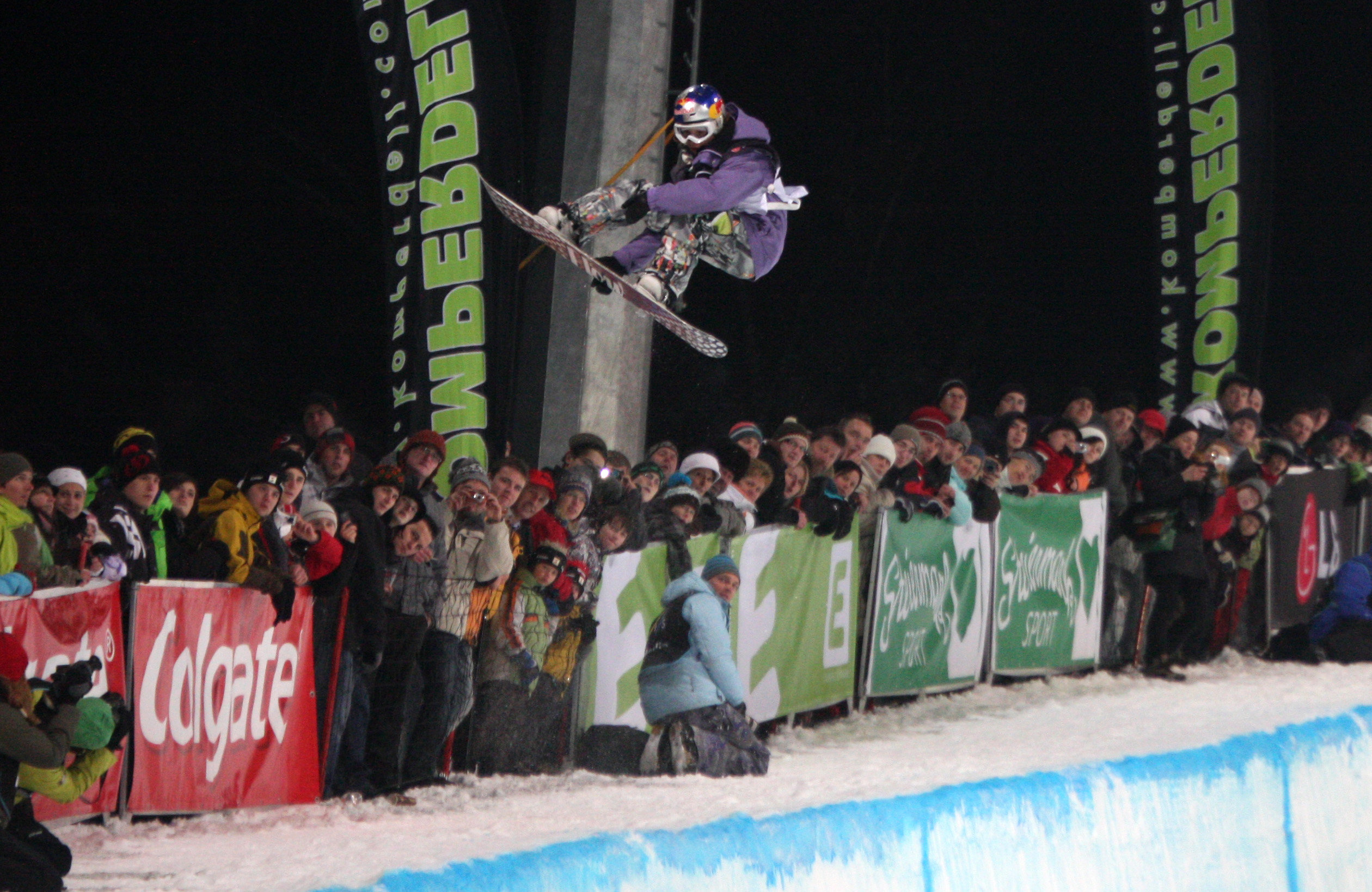
Win in Kreischberg, 7 January 2010

- 2010 FIS World Cup / Kreischberg – Halfpipe – 1st Place
- 2010 Winter Dew Tour – Slopestyle – 2nd Place
- 2008 FIS Junior World Snowboard Championships / Italy – 1st Place
