= Elena Könz =

Swiss snowboarder

Personal information
- Born: 12 September 1987 (age 38) Guarda
- Height: 5 ft 5 in (165 cm)
- Weight: 121 lb (55 kg)

Sport
- Country: Switzerland
- Sport: Snowboarding
Medal record
Representing Switzerland
Women's Snowboarding
FIS Snowboarding World Championships
Gold medal – first place	2015 Kreischberg	Big Air

Elena Könz (born 12 September 1987, Guarda) is a Swiss snowboarder, competing in slopestyle.

Könz qualified for the 2014 Winter Olympics and showed the third result in her heat in the qualification round (the seventh best result in the qualification), directly qualifying for the final. In the final, she fell in both runs and was classified ninth.

Her best World Cup result finish and the only podium before the 2014 Olympics was the third-place finish in Copper Mountain on December 22, 2013.

Könz only learned to ride snowboard as a teenager.
