= Merika Enne =

Finnish snowboarder (born 1992)

Personal information
- Born: 24 June 1992 (age 34) Tampere, Finland
- Height: 5 ft 7 in (170 cm)
- Weight: 137 lb (62 kg)

Sport
- Country: Finland
- Sport: Snowboarding
Medal record
Representing Finland
Women's Snowboarding
FIS Snowboarding World Championships
Silver medal – second place	2015 Kreischberg	Big Air

Merika Enne (born 24 June 1992) is a snowboarder from Finland.
