= Klaudia Medlová =

Slovak snowboarder (born 1993)

Personal information
- Nationality: Slovak
- Born: 26 October 1993 (age 32) Liptovský Mikuláš, Slovakia

Sport
- Country: Slovakia
- Sport: Snowboarding
- Event(s): Slopestyle; Big air
Medal record
Women's snowboarding
Representing Slovakia
World Championships
Bronze medal – third place	2015 Kreischberg	Slopestyle

Klaudia Medlová (born 26 October 1993 in Liptovský Mikuláš) is a retired Slovak snowboarder. She won a bronze medal in slopestyle at the FIS Freestyle Ski and Snowboarding World Championships 2015. Also in 2015, she stomped the first female double backside rodeo on a jump during the Nine Queens event in Serfaus-Fiss-Ladis, Austria.

Medlová has represented Slovakia at the 2018 Winter Olympics in PyeongChang and at the 2022 Winter Olympics in Beijing.

== International competitions ==
Year	Competition	Venue	Position	Event	Notes
2018	Winter Olympics	Pyeongchang, South Korea	24th	Slopestyle	
2018	Winter Olympics	Pyeongchang, South Korea	23rd	Big air	
2022	Winter Olympics	Beijing, China	DNS	Slopestyle	Injury
2022	Winter Olympics	Beijing, China	16th	Big air	
