= Cheryl Maas =

Dutch snowboarder

Personal information
- Born: 28 September 1984 (age 41) Uden, Netherlands
- Height: 5 ft 9 in (175 cm)
- Weight: 154 lb (70 kg)

Sport
- Country: Netherlands
- Sport: Snowboarding

Achievements and titles
- Olympic finals: 3
Medal record
New Zealand Winter Games
Bronze medal – third place	2013 Cardrona	Slopestyle
Winter X Games
Gold medal – first place	2016 Norway	Big Air

Cheryl Maas (born 28 September 1984) is a Dutch snowboarder. She competed at the 2006 Winter Olympics in Turin, finishing 11th at the halfpipe, at the 2014 Winter Olympics in Sochi, finishing 20th in slopestyle and in the 2018 Winter Olympics in PyeongChang where she finished 23rd in slopestyle and 20th in big air. She started snowboarding in 1993. In 2004, she played in the snowboard movie Dropstitch.

== 2016 Oslo ==
Cheryl Maas took home a gold medal during the women's big air event.

== Winter X Games 13 ==
She had an accident in the Winter X Games 13 slopestyle track while training before the event.

== Personal life ==
Cheryl Maas lived in Oslo and is married to Natalie Hatfield from Boise, Idaho in February 2021. Cheryl has two daughters called Lara and Mila Kjeldaas, with her ex-wife Stine Brun Kjeldaas. After Maas qualified for the 2014 Winter Olympics, she criticized the International Olympic Committee for hosting the Olympics in Russia, which had hostile legislation surrounding LGBT relationships.
