= Sina Candrian =

Swiss snowboarder (born 1988)

Personal information
- Born: 21 September 1988 (age 37) Flims
- Height: 163 cm (5 ft 4 in)
- Weight: 53 kg (117 lb)

Sport
- Country: Switzerland
- Sport: Snowboarding
- Event: Women's slopestyle
Medal record
Representing Switzerland
Women's Snowboarding
FIS Snowboarding World Championships
Silver medal – second place	2013 Stoneham	Slopestyle
Bronze medal – third place	2015 Kreischberg	Big Air
- Updated on 7 February 2014

Sina Candrian (born 21 November 1988 in Flims) is a Swiss snowboarder competing in the 2014 Sochi Winter Olympics.

== Career ==
Candrian's career in competitive snowboarding began in 2005, when she took 3rd place in the FIS Junior World Championships in Zermatt. The following year, she placed first in Big Air at the FIS Junior World Snowboard Championships in Korea. Her first TTR event was the Burton European Open, also in 2006, at Laax. She placed 4th in the 6Star Roxy Chicken Jam Slopestyle and won the Halfpipe at the 6Star O'Neill Evolution. At the end of the 2007–08 season, she was placed 6th in the world in the TTR.

In 2008–09, she placed 2nd in Slopestyle at the 6Star Burton European Open and ended the season ranked 7th.

In 2009–10, she placed 5th in the Roxy Chicken Jam and 2nd in the 6Star Burton European Open, and also won the first FIS Slopestyle Contest in Calgary. She placed 3rd in both the 5Star Burton Canadian Open and the first X-Games Europe. At the Burton US Open, she placed first in Slopestyle. She ended the season ranked 2nd worldwide by TTR.

She won the silver medal in the Slopestyle FIS Snowboarding World Championships 2013.
