= Ty Walker (snowboarder) =

American snowboarder (born 1997)

Personal information
- Born: Taylor Riley Walker; March 3, 1997 (age 29) Smithtown, New York, U.S.
- Education: Brown University
- Occupation: Professional Athlete
- Height: 5 ft 2 in (157 cm)
- Weight: 115 lb (52 kg)
- Website: facebook.com/tywalkersnow instagram.com/lifebyty twitter.com/tywalkersnow

Sport
- Country: United States
- Sport: Snowboarding
- Coached by: Bill Enos, Dave 'Danger' Boldwin
- Retired: Retired

Taylor Riley Walker (born March 3, 1997) is an American snowboarder, better known by her childhood nickname Ty Walker.

Born in Smithtown, New York, and raised in Stowe, Vermont, United States, she competed for United States at the 2014 Winter Olympics in Sochi. Later that year, Walker also won the first-ever World Cup for Women's Big Air snowboarding, an event that would later debut in the 2018 Winter Olympics. Taylor holds the record as the youngest Red Bull-sponsored athlete in history. Walker entered Brown University in the fall of 2015 and graduated as a member of the Class of 2020. During her time at Brown, she studied biology with a focus on pre-medical studies. She later attended medical school at the Robert Larner College of Medicine, where she received her Doctor of Medicine degree in 2025.
