= Finland at the 2018 Winter Olympics =

- Flag of Finland
- IOC code: FIN
- NOC: Finnish Olympic Committee
- Website: www.olympiakomitea.fi (in Finnish)

in Pyeongchang, South Korea 9–25 February 2018
- Competitors: 100 (61 men and 39 women) in 11 sports
- Flag bearer (opening): Janne Ahonen
- Flag bearer (closing): Mika Poutala
- Medals Ranked 18th: Gold 1 Silver 1 Bronze 4 Total 6

Winter Olympics appearances (overview)
- 1924; 1928; 1932; 1936; 1948; 1952; 1956; 1960; 1964; 1968; 1972; 1976; 1980; 1984; 1988; 1992; 1994; 1998; 2002; 2006; 2010; 2014; 2018; 2022; 2026

Finland competed at the 2018 Winter Olympics in Pyeongchang, South Korea, from 9 to 25 February 2018, with 100 competitors in 11 sports. They won six medals in total, one gold, one silver and four bronze, ranking 18th in the medal table.

== Medalists ==
Medal	Name	Sport	Event	Date
Gold	Iivo Niskanen	Cross-country skiing	Men's 50 kilometre classical	24 February
Silver	Krista Pärmäkoski	Cross-country skiing	Women's 30 kilometre classical	25 February
Bronze	Krista Pärmäkoski	Cross-country skiing	Women's 15 kilometre skiathlon	10 February
Bronze	Enni Rukajärvi	Snowboarding	Women's slopestyle	12 February
Bronze	Krista Pärmäkoski	Cross-country skiing	Women's 10 kilometre freestyle	15 February
Bronze	Finland women's national ice hockey team: Sanni Hakala; Jenni Hiirikoski; Venla Hovi; Mira Jalosuo; Michelle Karvinen; Rosa Lindstedt; Petra Nieminen; Tanja Niskanen; Emma Nuutinen; Isa Rahunen; Annina Rajahuhta; Meeri Räisänen; Noora Räty; Saila Saari; Ronja Savolainen; Eveliina Suonpää; Sara Säkkinen; Susanna Tapani; Noora Tulus; Minnamari Tuominen; Ella Viitasuo; Riikka Välilä; Linda Välimäki	Ice hockey	Women's tournament	21 February

Medals by sport
Sport	1st place, gold medalist(s)	2nd place, silver medalist(s)	3rd place, bronze medalist(s)	Total
Cross-country skiing	1	1	2	4
Ice hockey	0	0	1	1
Snowboarding	0	0	1	1
Total	1	1	4	6

== Competitors ==
The following is the list of number of competitors participating at the Games per sport/discipline.

Sport	Men	Women	Total
Alpine skiing	2	0	2
Biathlon	3	5	8
Cross-country skiing	8	7	15
Curling	1	1	2
Figure skating	0	1	1
Freestyle skiing	3	0	3
Ice hockey	25	23	48
Nordic combined	5	–	5
Ski jumping	5	1	6
Snowboarding	7	1	8
Speed skating	2	1	3
Total	61	39	100

== Alpine skiing ==
Finland has qualified two athletes.

Athlete	Event	Run 1		Run 2		Total	
Athlete	Event	Time	Rank	Time	Rank	Time	Rank
Andreas Romar	Men's downhill	—N/a				1:43.78	31
Andreas Romar	Men's super-G	—N/a				1:27.70	31
Andreas Romar	Men's combined	1:21.94	35	49.58	22	2:11.52	24
Samu Torsti	Men's giant slalom	1:10.93	22	1:10.44	11	2:21.37	17

== Biathlon ==
Based on their Nations Cup rankings in the 2016–17 Biathlon World Cup, Finland has qualified a team of 5 men and 5 women. Finland decided to send a team of 3 men and 5 women.

Men

Athlete	Event	Time	Misses	Rank
Tuomas Grönman	Sprint	25:24.3	1 (0+1)	45
Tuomas Grönman	Pursuit	38:58.9	6 (0+1+2+3)	55
Tuomas Grönman	Individual	52:44.1	3 (0+2+0+1)	48
Olli Hiidensalo	Sprint	24:26.3	0 (0+0)	19
Olli Hiidensalo	Pursuit	37:03.9	7 (1+2+1+3)	35
Olli Hiidensalo	Individual	54:57.6	5 (0+1+3+1)	73
Tero Seppälä	Sprint	24:27.3	1 (1+0)	20
Tero Seppälä	Pursuit	36:09.9	5 (1+1+3+0)	25
Tero Seppälä	Individual	55:10.8	6 (0+2+2+2)	76
Tero Seppälä	Mass start	37:25.0	3 (1+2+0+0)	21

Women

Athlete	Event	Time	Misses	Rank
Mari Laukkanen	Sprint	24:00.6	5 (3+2)	64
Mari Laukkanen	Individual	46:03.7	4 (2+1+0+1)	42
Venla Lehtonen	Sprint	25:13.7	3 (3+0)	79
Kaisa Mäkäräinen	Sprint	22:36.4	3 (2+1)	25
Kaisa Mäkäräinen	Pursuit	33:22.2	6 (0+3+3+0)	22
Kaisa Mäkäräinen	Individual	43:57.9	3 (1+1+1+0)	13
Kaisa Mäkäräinen	Mass start	36:23.9	2 (0+1+0+1)	10
Suvi Minkkinen	Individual	48:27.7	4 (2+1+0+1)	69
Laura Toivanen	Sprint	24:55.4	1 (0+1)	77
Laura Toivanen	Individual	46:42.6	3 (1+1+0+1)	49
Mari Laukkanen; Venla Lehtonen; Kaisa Mäkäräinen; Laura Toivanen	Team relay	1:14:37.2	15 (2+13)	15

Mixed

Athlete	Event	Time	Misses	Rank
Laura Toivanen; Kaisa Mäkäräinen; Tero Seppälä; Olli Hiidensalo	Team relay	1:09:38.2	3 (0+3)	6

== Cross-country skiing ==
Distance
Men

Athlete	Event	Classical		Freestyle		Final		
Athlete	Event	Time	Rank	Time	Rank	Time	Deficit	Rank
Ristomatti Hakola	50 km classical	—N/a				2:22:50.1	+14:28.0	43
Matti Heikkinen	15 km freestyle	—N/a				34:45.4	+1:01.5	10
Matti Heikkinen	30 km skiathlon	41:55.6	34	35:32.0	7	1:17:55.9	+1:35.9	21
Matti Heikkinen	50 km classical	—N/a				2:17:34.8	+9:12.7	25
Perttu Hyvärinen	15 km freestyle	—N/a				36:17.2	+2:33.3	35
Perttu Hyvärinen	30 km skiathlon	41:57.0	36	37:58.0	39	1:20:28.5	+4:08.5	41
Perttu Hyvärinen	50 km classical	—N/a				2:18:38.5	+10:16.4	29
Lari Lehtonen	15 km freestyle	—N/a				36:01.8	+2:17.9	31
Lari Lehtonen	30 km skiathlon	42:28.9	41	36:28.1	23	1:19:26.6	+3:06.6	33
Iivo Niskanen	30 km skiathlon	40:30.0	1	36:34.3	26	1:17:34.2	+1:14.2	19
Iivo Niskanen	50 km classical	—N/a				2:08:22.1	+0.0	1st place, gold medalist(s)
Anssi Pentsinen	15 km freestyle	—N/a				36:54.9	+3:11.0	51
Matti Heikkinen; Perttu Hyvärinen; Lari Lehtonen; Iivo Niskanen	4×10 km relay	50:12.7	6	44:32.7	6	1:34:45.4	+1:40.5	4

Women

Athlete	Event	Classical		Freestyle		Final		
Athlete	Event	Time	Rank	Time	Rank	Time	Deficit	Rank
Johanna Matintalo	15 km skiathlon	21:32.9	14	21:00.1	26	43:02.4	+2:10.4	24
Johanna Matintalo	30 km classical	—N/a				1:28:58.2	+6:40.6	18
Laura Mononen	10 km freestyle	—N/a				27:15.6	+2:15.1	23
Laura Mononen	15 km skiathlon	21:48.3	21	20:31.6	23	42:53.0	+2:08.1	19
Kerttu Niskanen	15 km skiathlon	21:26.6	7	20:16.6	20	42:15.2	+1:30.3	16
Kerttu Niskanen	30 km classical	—N/a				1:25:19.2	+3:01.6	6
Krista Pärmäkoski	10 km freestyle	—N/a				25:32.4	+31.9	3rd place, bronze medalist(s)
Krista Pärmäkoski	15 km skiathlon	21:27.9	10	18:59.2	3	40:52.7	+10.1	3rd place, bronze medalist(s)
Krista Pärmäkoski	30 km classical	—N/a				1:24:07.1	+1:49.05	2nd place, silver medalist(s)
Riitta-Liisa Roponen	10 km freestyle	—N/a				27:04.8	+2:04.3	20
Aino-Kaisa Saarinen	30 km classical	—N/a				1:30:32.2	+8:14.6	20
Kerttu Niskanen; Krista Pärmäkoski; Riitta-Liisa Roponen; Aino-Kaisa Saarinen	4×5 km relay	27:25.1	3	25:01.8	5	52:26.9	+1:02.6	4

Sprint
Men

Athlete	Event	Qualification		Quarterfinal		Semifinal		Final	
Athlete	Event	Time	Rank	Time	Rank	Time	Rank	Time	Rank
Ristomatti Hakola	Sprint	3:08.54	1 Q	3:09.41	2 Q	3:09.93	1 Q	3:26.47	6
Martti Jylhä	Sprint	3:16.79	24 Q	3:17.46	1 Q	3:14.93	5	DNA	10
Iivo Niskanen	Sprint	3:16.27	21 Q	3:12.20	3	did not advance			14
Lauri Vuorinen	Sprint	3:16.69	23 Q	3:33.13	6	did not advance			29
Ristomatti Hakola; Martti Jylhä	Team sprint	—N/a				16:01.41	4 q	16:32.30	9

Women

Athlete	Event	Qualification		Quarterfinal		Semifinal		Final	
Athlete	Event	Time	Rank	Time	Rank	Time	Rank	Time	Rank
Johanna Matintalo	Sprint	3:19.04	19 Q	3:16.92	4	did not advance			19
Kerttu Niskanen	Sprint	3:20.48	24 Q	3:19.48	5	did not advance			23
Krista Pärmäkoski	Sprint	3:12.30	3 Q	3:11.97	2 Q	3:12.04	5	DNA	9
Aino-Kaisa Saarinen	Sprint	3:24.02	30 Q	3:19.18	5	did not advance			25
Mari Laukkanen; Krista Pärmäkoski	Team sprint	—N/a				16:31.54	4 q	16:19.18	5

== Curling ==
Summary

Team	Event	Group Stage								Tiebreaker	Semifinal	Final / BM	
Team	Event	Opposition Score	Opposition Score	Opposition Score	Opposition Score	Opposition Score	Opposition Score	Opposition Score	Rank	Opposition Score	Opposition Score	Opposition Score	Rank
Oona Kauste; Tomi Rantamäki	Mixed doubles	(South Korea) KOR; L 4–9	(Switzerland) SUI; L 6–7	(International Olympic Committee) OAR; L 5–7	(Canada) CAN; L 2–8	(Norway) NOR; L 6–7	(China) CHN; L 5–10	(United States) USA; W 7–5	7	did not advance			

=== Mixed doubles tournament ===
Based on results from 2016 World Mixed Doubles Curling Championship and 2017 World Mixed Doubles Curling Championship, Finland has qualified their mixed doubles as the highest ranked nations.

Final round robin standings
Team	Athletes	Pld	W	L	PF	PA	EW	EL	BE	SE	S%	Qualification
Canada	Kaitlyn Lawes / John Morris	7	6	1	52	26	28	20	0	9	80%	Playoffs
Switzerland	Jenny Perret / Martin Rios	7	5	2	45	40	29	26	0	10	71%	Playoffs
Olympic Athletes from Russia	Anastasia Bryzgalova / Alexander Krushelnitskiy	7	4	3	36	44	26	27	1	7	67%	Playoffs
Norway	Kristin Skaslien / Magnus Nedregotten	7	4	3	39	43	26	25	1	8	74%	Tiebreaker
China	Wang Rui / Ba Dexin	7	4	3	47	42	27	27	1	6	72%	Tiebreaker
South Korea	Jang Hye-ji / Lee Ki-jeong	7	2	5	40	40	23	29	1	7	67%	
United States	Rebecca Hamilton / Matt Hamilton	7	2	5	37	43	26	25	0	9	74%	
Finland	Oona Kauste / Tomi Rantamäki	7	1	6	35	53	23	29	0	6	67%	

Draw 1

Thursday, February 8, 9:05

Sheet C	1	2	3	4	5	6	7	8	Final
South Korea (Jang / Lee)	3	1	1	0	0	0	4	X	9
Finland (Kauste / Rantamäki) 🔨	0	0	0	1	2	1	0	X	4

Draw 2

Thursday, February 8, 20:04

Sheet A	1	2	3	4	5	6	7	8	Final
Finland (Kauste / Rantamäki) 🔨	0	0	2	0	0	2	2	0	6
Switzerland (Perret / Rios)	2	1	0	2	1	0	0	1	7

Draw 3

Friday, February 9, 8:35

Sheet D	1	2	3	4	5	6	7	8	Final
Olympic Athletes from Russia (Bryzgalova / Krushelnitskiy)	0	0	4	0	1	2	0	X	7
Finland (Kauste / Rantamäki) 🔨	2	1	0	1	0	0	1	X	5

Draw 4

Friday, February 9, 13:35

Sheet A	1	2	3	4	5	6	7	8	Final
Canada (Lawes / Morris)	1	0	1	1	0	5	X	X	8
Finland (Kauste / Rantamäki) 🔨	0	1	0	0	1	0	X	X	2

Draw 5

Saturday, February 10, 9:05

Sheet B	1	2	3	4	5	6	7	8	9	Final
Norway (Skaslien / Nedregotten)	1	0	1	0	3	0	1	0	1	7
Finland (Kauste / Rantamäki) 🔨	0	2	0	1	0	2	0	1	0	6

Draw 6

Saturday, February 10, 20:04

Sheet D	1	2	3	4	5	6	7	8	Final
Finland (Kauste / Rantamäki) 🔨	0	3	0	1	0	1	0	X	5
China (Wang / Ba)	3	0	1	0	4	0	2	X	10

Draw 7

Sunday, February 11, 9:05

Sheet B	1	2	3	4	5	6	7	8	Final
Finland (Kauste / Rantamäki)	1	0	0	1	1	0	4	0	7
United States (R. Hamilton / M. Hamilton) 🔨	0	1	1	0	0	1	0	2	5

== Figure skating ==
Finland qualified one female figure skater through the 2017 CS Nebelhorn Trophy.

Athlete	Event	SP		FS		Total	
Athlete	Event	Points	Rank	Points	Rank	Points	Rank
Emmi Peltonen	Ladies' singles	55.28	18 Q	101.86	21	157.14	20

== Freestyle skiing ==
Moguls

Athlete	Event	Qualification								Final											
Athlete	Event	Run 1				Run 2				Run 1				Run 2				Run 3			
Athlete	Event	Time	Points	Total	Rank	Time	Points	Total	Rank	Time	Points	Total	Rank	Time	Points	Total	Rank	Time	Points	Total	Rank
Jussi Penttala	Men's moguls	27.32	18.18	30.15	28	27.68	56.46	67.96	19	Did not advance											29
Jimi Salonen	Men's moguls	28.48	32.74	43.18	27	24.92	60.11	75.25	8 Q	25.16	57.94	72.76	16	did not advance							16

Slopestyle

Athlete	Event	Qualification				Final				
Athlete	Event	Run 1	Run 2	Best	Rank	Run 1	Run 2	Run 3	Best	Rank
Joona Kangas	Men's slopestyle	47.80	48.80	48.80	26	did not advance				

== Ice hockey ==
Summary

Key:

- OT – Overtime
- GWS – Match decided by penalty-shootout

Team	Event	Group Stage				Qualification playoff	Quarterfinal	Semifinal / Pl.	Final / BM / Pl.	
Team	Event	Opposition Score	Opposition Score	Opposition Score	Rank	Opposition Score	Opposition Score	Opposition Score	Opposition Score	Rank
Finland men's	Men's tournament	Germany; W 5–2	Norway; W 5–1	Sweden; L 1–3	2	South Korea; W 5–2	Canada; L 0–1	did not advance		6
Finland women's	Women's tournament	United States; L 1–3	Canada; L 1–4	(International Olympic Committee) Olympic Athletes from Russia; W 5–1	3	—N/a	Sweden; W 7–2	United States; L 0–5	(International Olympic Committee) Olympic Athletes from Russia; W 3–2	3rd place, bronze medalist(s)

=== Men's tournament ===
Finland men's national ice hockey team qualified by finishing 4th in the 2015 IIHF World Ranking.

Team roster

- Men's team event – 1 team of 25 players

The following is the Finnish roster for the men's ice hockey tournament at the 2018 Winter Olympics.

Head coach: (Finland) Lauri Marjamäki Assistant coaches: (Finland) Ari Hilli, (Finland) Mikko Manner, (Finland) Jussi Tapola

No.	Pos.	Name	Height	Weight	Birthdate	Birthplace	2017–18 team
2	D	Mikko Lehtonen	1.83 m (6 ft 0 in)	88 kg (194 lb)	16 January 1994	Turku	(Finland) Tappara (Liiga)
4	D	Tommi Kivistö	1.86 m (6 ft 1 in)	94 kg (207 lb)	7 June 1991	Vantaa	(Finland) Jokerit (KHL)
5	D	Lasse Kukkonen – C	1.84 m (6 ft 0 in)	85 kg (187 lb)	18 September 1981	Oulu	(Finland) Kärpät (Liiga)
12	F	Marko Anttila	2.03 m (6 ft 8 in)	104 kg (229 lb)	27 May 1985	Lempäälä	(Finland) Jokerit (KHL)
13	F	Julius Junttila	1.78 m (5 ft 10 in)	81 kg (179 lb)	15 August 1991	Oulu	(Finland) Kärpät (Liiga)
18	D	Sami Lepistö – A	1.83 m (6 ft 0 in)	87 kg (192 lb)	17 October 1984	Espoo	(Finland) Jokerit (KHL)
19	G	Mikko Koskinen	2.01 m (6 ft 7 in)	95 kg (209 lb)	18 July 1988	Vantaa	(Russia) SKA Saint Petersburg (KHL)
20	F	Eeli Tolvanen	1.79 m (5 ft 10 in)	82 kg (181 lb)	22 April 1999	Vihti	(Finland) Jokerit (KHL)
23	F	Joonas Kemppainen	1.90 m (6 ft 3 in)	102 kg (225 lb)	7 April 1988	Kajaani	(Russia) Salavat Yulaev Ufa (KHL)
24	F	Jani Lajunen	1.89 m (6 ft 2 in)	94 kg (207 lb)	16 June 1990	Espoo	(Switzerland) HC Lugano (NL)
25	F	Jonas Enlund	1.83 m (6 ft 0 in)	86 kg (190 lb)	3 November 1987	Helsinki	(Russia) Sibir Novosibirsk (KHL)
27	F	Petri Kontiola – A	1.83 m (6 ft 0 in)	97 kg (214 lb)	4 October 1984	Seinäjoki	(Russia) Lokomotiv Yaroslavl (KHL)
31	G	Karri Rämö	1.88 m (6 ft 2 in)	93 kg (205 lb)	1 July 1986	Asikkala	(Finland) Jokerit (KHL)
37	F	Mika Pyörälä	1.82 m (6 ft 0 in)	81 kg (179 lb)	13 July 1981	Oulu	(Switzerland) SC Bern (NL)
38	D	Juuso Hietanen	1.80 m (5 ft 11 in)	85 kg (187 lb)	14 June 1985	Hämeenlinna	(Russia) Dynamo Moscow (KHL)
40	F	Jarno Koskiranta	1.92 m (6 ft 4 in)	92 kg (203 lb)	9 December 1986	Paimio	(Russia) SKA Saint Petersburg (KHL)
42	D	Miro Heiskanen	1.84 m (6 ft 0 in)	83 kg (183 lb)	18 July 1999	Espoo	(Finland) HIFK (Liiga)
50	D	Miika Koivisto	1.84 m (6 ft 0 in)	87 kg (192 lb)	20 July 1990	Vaasa	(Finland) Kärpät (Liiga)
55	D	Atte Ohtamaa	1.88 m (6 ft 2 in)	96 kg (212 lb)	6 November 1987	Nivala	(Russia) Ak Bars Kazan (KHL)
62	F	Oskar Osala	1.94 m (6 ft 4 in)	110 kg (240 lb)	26 December 1987	Vaasa	(Russia) Metallurg Magnitogorsk (KHL)
65	F	Sakari Manninen	1.72 m (5 ft 8 in)	76 kg (168 lb)	10 February 1992	Oulu	(Sweden) Örebro HK (SHL)
70	F	Teemu Hartikainen	1.86 m (6 ft 1 in)	104 kg (229 lb)	3 May 1990	Kuopio	(Russia) Salavat Yulaev Ufa (KHL)
77	G	Juha Metsola	1.77 m (5 ft 10 in)	69 kg (152 lb)	24 February 1989	Tampere	(Russia) Amur Khabarovsk (KHL)
81	F	Jukka Peltola	1.84 m (6 ft 0 in)	85 kg (187 lb)	26 August 1987	Tampere	(Finland) Tappara (Liiga)
86	F	Veli-Matti Savinainen	1.82 m (6 ft 0 in)	82 kg (181 lb)	5 January 1986	Espoo	(Russia) Yugra (KHL)

Preliminary round

Pos	Team	Pld	W	OTW	OTL	L	GF	GA	GD	Pts	Qualification
1	Sweden	3	3	0	0	0	8	1	+7	9	Quarterfinals
2	Finland	3	2	0	0	1	11	6	+5	6	Qualification playoffs
3	Germany	3	0	1	0	2	4	7	−3	2	Qualification playoffs
4	Norway	3	0	0	1	2	2	11	−9	1	Qualification playoffs

Source: IIHF

15 February 2018; 12:10	Finland	5–2 (2–1, 2–0, 1–1)	Germany	Gangneung Hockey Centre, Gangneung; Attendance: 3,695

Game reference

Mikko Koskinen
Goalies
Danny aus den Birken
Referees:
(Canada) Oliver Gouin
(Slovakia) Jozef Kubuš
Linesmen:
(Switzerland) Nicolas Fluri
(Czech Republic) Miroslav Lhotský

Lepistö (Kontiola, Tolvanen) (PP) – 03:13	1–0
	1–1	08:44 – Macek (Ehrhoff, Wolf) (PP)
Pyörälä (Lajunen, Manninen) – 15:30	2–1
Tolvanen (Hartikainen, Kemppainen) (PP) – 37:22	3–1
Kukkonen (Kontiola, Tolvanen) – 38:43	4–1
	4–2	41:51 – Hördler
Kemppainen (Tolvanen, Lepistö) (PP) – 52:48	5–2

10 min
Penalties
10 min
20
Shots
24

16 February 2018; 21:10	Finland	5–1 (1–1, 1–0, 3–0)	Norway	Gangneung Hockey Centre, Gangneung; Attendance: 4,180

Game reference

Mikko Koskinen
Goalies
Lars Haugen
Referees:
(Czech Republic) Jan Hribik
(Canada) Brett Iverson
Linesmen:
(Sweden) Jimmy Dahmen
(United States) Fraser McIntyre

	0–1	06:29 – P. Thoresen (Kristiansen, K.A. Olimb) (PP)
Tolvanen (Lepistö) (PP) – 16:36	1–1
Tolvanen (Peltola) – 25:32	2–1
Savinainen (Koskiranta) – 42:59	3–1
Lepistö (Kontiola) (PP) – 47:54	4–1
Manninen (Kontiola) – 56:48	5–1

8 min
Penalties
12 min
30
Shots
22

18 February 2018; 21:10	Sweden	3–1 (1–0, 0–1, 2–0)	Finland	Kwandong Hockey Centre, Gangneung; Attendance: 3,861

Game reference

Viktor Fasth
Goalies
Mikko Koskinen
Referees:
(Canada) Oliver Gouin
(Czech Republic) Antonín Jeřábek
Linesmen:
(Switzerland) Roman Kaderli
(Germany) Lukas Kohlmüller

Lander (Omark, Fasth) – 14:53	1–0
	1–1	21:32 – Kemppainen (Koivisto, Junttila)
Zackrisson (Fransson) – 48:53	2–1
Möller (Omark) (PP, ENG) – 59:55	3–1

10 min
Penalties
14 min
23
Shots
19

Qualification playoff

20 February 2018; 21:10	Finland	5–2 (1–0, 2–2, 2–0)	South Korea	Gangneung Hockey Centre, Pyeongchang; Attendance: 5,409

Game reference

Mikko Koskinen
Goalies
Matt Dalton
Referees:
(Russia) Roman Gofman
(United States) Timothy Mayer
Linesmen:
(Switzerland) Nicolas Fluri
(Russia) Gleb Lazarev

Kontiola (Tolvanen, Kemppainen) (PP) – 04:42	1–0
Kontiola (Lepistö, Tolvanen) (PP) – 23:44	2–0
Heiskanen (Tolvanen) – 26:23	3–0
	3–1	30:06 – Radunske (Regan, Kim S.W.)
	3–2	32:09 – Ahn J.H. (Shin S.H.)
Hietanen (Osala, Savinainen) (PP) – 47:20	4–2
Manninen (Hietanen, Koskiranta) (ENG) – 59:53	5–2

2 min
Penalties
8 min
36
Shots
19

Quarterfinal

21 February 2018; 21:10	Canada	1–0 (0–0, 0–0, 1–0)	Finland	Gangneung Hockey Centre, Pyeongchang; Attendance: 2,265

Game reference
Ben Scrivens; Kevin Poulin	Goalies	Mikko Koskinen	Referees: (Czech Republic) Antonín Jeřábek (Russia) Konstantin Olenin; Linesmen: (Russia) Gleb Lazarev (Sweden) Henrik Pihlblad
Noreau (O'Dell) – 40:55 / 1–0			Referees: (Czech Republic) Antonín Jeřábek (Russia) Konstantin Olenin; Linesmen: (Russia) Gleb Lazarev (Sweden) Henrik Pihlblad
6 min	Penalties	4 min	Referees: (Czech Republic) Antonín Jeřábek (Russia) Konstantin Olenin; Linesmen: (Russia) Gleb Lazarev (Sweden) Henrik Pihlblad
30	Shots	21	Referees: (Czech Republic) Antonín Jeřábek (Russia) Konstantin Olenin; Linesmen: (Russia) Gleb Lazarev (Sweden) Henrik Pihlblad

=== Women's tournament ===
Finland women's national ice hockey team qualified by finishing 3rd in the 2016 IIHF World Ranking.

Team roster

- Women's team event – 1 team of 23 players

The Finnish roster for the women's ice hockey tournament at the 2018 Winter Olympics was published on 22 January 2018.

Head coach: (Finland) Pasi Mustonen Assistant coaches: (Finland) Juuso Toivola

No.	Pos.	Name	Height	Weight	Birthdate	Birthplace	2017–18 team
1	G	Eveliina Suonpää	1.74 m (5 ft 9 in)	64 kg (141 lb)	12 April 1995	Kiukainen	(Finland) Lukko (Liiga)
2	D	Isa Rahunen	1.65 m (5 ft 5 in)	66 kg (146 lb)	16 April 1993	Kuopio	(Finland) Kärpät (Liiga)
4	D	Rosa Lindstedt	1.86 m (6 ft 1 in)	80 kg (180 lb)	24 January 1988	Ylöjärvi	(Sweden) HV71 (SDHL)
6	D	Jenni Hiirikoski – C	1.61 m (5 ft 3 in)	62 kg (137 lb)	30 March 1987	Lempäälä	(Sweden) Luleå HF (SDHL)
7	D	Mira Jalosuo	1.84 m (6 ft 0 in)	80 kg (180 lb)	3 February 1989	Lieksa	(Finland) Kärpät (Liiga)
8	D	Ella Viitasuo	1.72 m (5 ft 8 in)	66 kg (146 lb)	27 May 1996	Lahti	(Finland) Espoo Blues (Liiga)
9	F	Venla Hovi	1.69 m (5 ft 7 in)	67 kg (148 lb)	28 October 1987	Tampere	(Canada) Univ. of Manitoba (U SPORTS)
10	F	Linda Välimäki	1.66 m (5 ft 5 in)	72 kg (159 lb)	31 May 1990	Ylöjärvi	(Finland) Ilves (Liiga)
11	F	Annina Rajahuhta	1.64 m (5 ft 5 in)	69 kg (152 lb)	8 March 1989	Helsinki	(China) Kunlun Red Star (CWHL)
13	F	Riikka Välilä – A	1.63 m (5 ft 4 in)	60 kg (130 lb)	12 June 1973	Jyväskylä	(Sweden) HV71 (SDHL)
15	D	Minnamari Tuominen	1.65 m (5 ft 5 in)	71 kg (157 lb)	26 June 1990	Helsinki	(Finland) Espoo Blues (Liiga)
18	G	Meeri Räisänen	1.70 m (5 ft 7 in)	62 kg (137 lb)	2 December 1989	Tampere	(Finland) HPK (Liiga)
19	F	Petra Nieminen	1.69 m (5 ft 7 in)	64 kg (141 lb)	4 May 1999	Tampere	(Finland) Team Kuortane (Liiga)
22	F	Emma Nuutinen	1.76 m (5 ft 9 in)	73 kg (161 lb)	7 December 1996	Vantaa	(United States) Mercyhurst University (NCAA)
23	F	Sanni Hakala	1.53 m (5 ft 0 in)	56 kg (123 lb)	31 October 1997	Jyväskylä	(Sweden) HV71 (SDHL)
24	F	Noora Tulus	1.65 m (5 ft 5 in)	67 kg (148 lb)	15 August 1995	Vantaa	(Sweden) Luleå HF (SDHL)
26	F	Sara Säkkinen	1.62 m (5 ft 4 in)	61 kg (134 lb)	7 April 1998	Tampere	(Finland) Team Kuortane (Liiga)
27	F	Saila Saari	1.70 m (5 ft 7 in)	62 kg (137 lb)	1 November 1989	Alavus	(Finland) Kärpät (Liiga)
33	F	Michelle Karvinen – A	1.67 m (5 ft 6 in)	70 kg (150 lb)	27 March 1990	Rødovre, Denmark	(Sweden) Luleå HF (SDHL)
41	G	Noora Räty	1.64 m (5 ft 5 in)	65 kg (143 lb)	29 May 1989	Espoo	(China) Kunlun Red Star (CWHL)
61	F	Tanja Niskanen	1.76 m (5 ft 9 in)	69 kg (152 lb)	9 November 1992	Juankoski	(Finland) KalPa (Liiga)
77	F	Susanna Tapani	1.75 m (5 ft 9 in)	60 kg (130 lb)	2 March 1993	Laitila	(Finland) Lukko (Liiga)
88	D	Ronja Savolainen	1.76 m (5 ft 9 in)	70 kg (150 lb)	29 November 1997	Helsinki	(Sweden) Luleå HF (SDHL)

Preliminary round

Pos	Team	Pld	W	OTW	OTL	L	GF	GA	GD	Pts	Qualification
1	Canada	3	3	0	0	0	11	2	+9	9	Semifinals
2	United States	3	2	0	0	1	9	3	+6	6	Semifinals
3	Finland	3	1	0	0	2	7	8	−1	3	Quarterfinals
4	Olympic Athletes from Russia	3	0	0	0	3	1	15	−14	0	Quarterfinals

Source: IIHF

11 February 2018; 16:40	Finland	1–3 (1–0, 0–2, 0–1)	United States	Kwandong Hockey Centre, Gangneung; Attendance: 4,032

Game reference

Noora Räty
Goalies
Maddie Rooney
Referees:
(Germany) Nicole Hertrich
(Norway) Aina Hove
Linesmen:
(France) Charlotte Girard-Fabre
(Sweden) Veronica Johansson

Hovi (Nieminen, Välimäki) – 19:54	1–0
	1–1	28:58 – Lamoureux-Morando
	1–2	31:29 – Coyne (Knight, Decker)
	1–3	59:47 – Cameranesi (Keller) (ENG)

8 min
Penalties
4 min
24
Shots
42

13 February 2018; 16:40	Canada	4–1 (2–0, 2–0, 0–1)	Finland	Kwandong Hockey Centre, Gangneung; Attendance: 3,879

Game reference

Shannon Szabados
Goalies
Noora Räty
Referees:
(United States) Dina Allena
(United States) Melissa Szkola
Linesmen:
(Sweden) Veronica Johansson
(United States) Jessica Leclerc

Agosta (Daoust) – 00:35	1–0
Poulin – 17:11	2–0
Daoust (Fortino, Agosta) – 28:19	3–0
Saulnier (Johnston) – 38:26	4–0
	4–1	47:17 – Välilä (Tapani, Karvinen)

8 min
Penalties
10 min
32
Shots
23

15 February 2018; 16:40	Olympic Athletes from Russia	1–5 (0–1, 0–2, 1–2)	Finland	Kwandong Hockey Centre, Gangneung; Attendance: 3,353

Game reference

Nadezhda Morozova
Goalies
Noora Räty
Referees:
(Germany) Nicole Hertrich
(United States) Melissa Szkola
Linesmen:
(Germany) Lisa Linnek
(Canada) Justine Todd

	0–1	17:47 – Karvinen (Hiirikoski) (PP)
	0–2	20:20 – Karvinen (Nuutinen, Välilä)
	0–3	39:08 – Välilä
Shokhina (Belyakova) – 44:50	1–3
	1–4	52:49 – Tuominen (Hiirikoski, Nieminen) (PP)
	1–5	55:33 – Nieminen

8 min
Penalties
4 min
25
Shots
37

Quarterfinal

17 February 2018; 16:40	Finland	7–2 (3–0, 2–2, 2–0)	Sweden	Kwandong Hockey Centre, Gangneung; Attendance: 3,803

Game reference

Noora Räty
Goalies
Sara Grahn
Sarah Berglind
Referees:
(Switzerland) Drahomira Fialova
(United States) Katie Guay
Linesmen:
(Slovenia) Natasa Pagon
(Czech Republic) Zuzana Svobodová

Nieminen (Hovi) – 06:12	1–0
Välilä (Rahunen) – 15:32	2–0
Tapani (Tulus, Välimäki) (PP) – 17:44	3–0
Karvinen (Tuominen, Savolainen) – 27:14	4–0
	4–1	28:53 – Nordin (Grahm, Svedin)
Välilä (Karvinen, Tapani) – 29:29	5–1
	5–2	39:12 – Stenberg (Nylén Persson) (SH)
Nuutinen (Tulus, Rahunen) - 44:35	6–2
Hakala (Rajahuhta) - 57:47	7–2

4 min
Penalties
12 min
31
Shots
21

Semifinal

19 February 2018; 13:10	United States	5−0 (2−0, 2−0, 1−0)	Finland	Gangneung Hockey Centre, Gangneung; Attendance: 5,173

Game reference

Maddie Rooney
Goalies
Noora Räty
Referees:
(Slovakia) Nikoleta Celárová
(Germany) Nicole Hertrich
Linesmen:
(Slovenia) Nataša Pagon
(Canada) Justine Todd

Marvin (Duggan, Pelkey) − 02:25	1−0
Cameranesi − 18:38	2−0
Lamoureux-Davidson (Pannek, Cameranesi) (PP2) – 33:21	3−0
Knight (Morin, Coyne) (PP) − 33:55	4−0
Cameranesi (Brandt, Kessel) (PP) – 40:45	5–0

6 min
Penalties
12 min
38
Shots
14

Bronze medal game

21 February 2018; 16:40	(bronze) Finland	3–2 (1–0, 2–1, 0–1)	Olympic Athletes from Russia	Kwandong Hockey Centre, Gangneung; Attendance: 3,217

Game reference

Noora Räty
Goalies
Nadezhda Morozova
Referees:
(United States) Dina Allen
(Canada) Gabrielle Ariano-Lortie
Linesmen:
(United States) Jessica Leclerc
(Canada) Justine Todd

Nieminen (Tuominen, Tapani) (PP) – 02:23	1–0
Tapani (Karvinen) – 20:10	2–0
	2–1	22:40 – Sosina (Belyakova)
Välimäki (Hovi) – 32:18	3–1
	3–2	46:03 – Belyakova (Batalova, Shtaryova) (PP)

8 min
Penalties
35 min
22
Shots
22

== Nordic combined ==
Athlete	Event	Ski jumping			Cross-country		Total	
Athlete	Event	Distance	Points	Rank	Time	Rank	Time	Rank
Ilkka Herola	Normal hill/10 km	97.0	99.7	17	23:52.9	2	25:56.9	8
Ilkka Herola	Large hill/10 km	119.5	103.6	28	23:25.2	5	25:46.2	18
Eero Hirvonen	Normal hill/10 km	102.0	118.0	6	24:53.0	19	25:43.0	6
Eero Hirvonen	Large hill/10 km	132.5	127.9	7	23:30.6	9	24:14.6	6
Arttu Mäkiaho	Normal hill/10 km	91.0	85.2	=34	25:25.3	31	28:27.3	36
Arttu Mäkiaho	Large hill/10 km	108.0	81.7	42	24:12.3	24	28:01.3	38
Hannu Manninen	Normal hill/10 km	90.0	85.2	=34	24:27.8	8	27:29.8	23
Leevi Mutru	Large hill/10 km	111.0	81.9	41	23:30.3	8	27:18.3	31
Ilkka Herola; Leevi Mutru; Hannu Manninen; Eero Hirvonen	Team large hill/4×5 km	484.5	381.3	7	46:42.5	3	48:40.5	6

== Ski jumping ==
Men

Athlete	Event	Qualification			First round			Final			Total	
Athlete	Event	Distance	Points	Rank	Distance	Points	Rank	Distance	Points	Rank	Points	Rank
Antti Aalto	Normal hill	87.5	93.6	42 Q	80.0	60.8	50	did not advance				
Antti Aalto	Large hill	133.0	109.3	20 Q	121.5	105.7	=37	did not advance				
Janne Ahonen	Normal hill	89.0	95.8	37 Q	90.5	85.1	40	did not advance				
Janne Ahonen	Large hill	119.0	90.8	36 Q	124.5	110.6	30 Q	115.5	100.0	28	210.6	28
Andreas Alamommo	Normal hill	90.0	98.3	35 Q	94.0	91.3	38	did not advance				
Andreas Alamommo	Large hill	129.5	97.7	29 Q	120.0	107.6	34	did not advance				
Jarkko Määttä	Large hill	116.5	79.0	43 Q	122.0	105.7	=37	did not advance				
Eetu Nousiainen	Normal hill	87.0	85.5	50 Q	83.0	68.0	49	did not advance				
Janne Ahonen; Andreas Alamommo; Jarkko Määttä; Antti Aalto	Team large hill	—N/a			466.5	397.5	8 Q	468	392.9	8	790.4	8

Women

Athlete	Event	First round			Final			Total	
Athlete	Event	Distance	Points	Rank	Distance	Points	Rank	Points	Rank
Julia Kykkänen	Normal hill	85.0	77.2	22 Q	84.0	75.4	26	152.6	23

== Snowboarding ==
Finland has nominated 8 athletes: Enni Rukajärvi, Roope Tonteri, Kalle Järvilehto, Rene Rinnekangas, Peetu Piiroinen, Markus Malin, Janne Korpi and Anton Lindfors.

Freestyle
Men

Athlete	Event	Qualification				Final				
Athlete	Event	Run 1	Run 2	Best	Rank	Run 1	Run 2	Run 3	Best	Rank
Kalle Järvilehto	Big air	83.25	44.75	83.25	12	did not advance				21
Kalle Järvilehto	Slopestyle	15.56	31.10	31.10	32	did not advance				
Janne Korpi	Halfpipe	4.50	22.50	22.50	28	did not advance				
Markus Malin	Halfpipe	30.25	63.50	63.50	19	did not advance				
Peetu Piiroinen	Big air	43.50	87.25	87.25	8	did not advance				14
Peetu Piiroinen	Halfpipe	14.25	77.50	77.50	11 Q	4.50	12.75	13.50	13.50	12
Peetu Piiroinen	Slopestyle	69.26	43.43	69.26	18	did not advance				
Rene Rinnekangas	Big air	43.75	83.00	83.00	10	did not advance				22
Rene Rinnekangas	Slopestyle	24.86	37.91	37.91	28	did not advance				
Roope Tonteri	Big air	86.50	47.50	86.50	9	did not advance				15
Roope Tonteri	Slopestyle	72.60	38.08	72.60	15	did not advance				

Women

Athlete	Event	Qualification				Final				
Athlete	Event	Run 1	Run 2	Best	Rank	Run 1	Run 2	Run 3	Best	Rank
Enni Rukajärvi	Big air	68.75	49.75	68.75	16	did not advance				
Enni Rukajärvi	Slopestyle	Canceled				45.85	75.38	CAN	75.38	3rd place, bronze medalist(s)

Snowboard cross

Athlete	Event	Seeding						1/8 final	Quarterfinal	Semifinal	Final	
Athlete	Event	Run 1		Run 2		Best	Seed	1/8 final	Quarterfinal	Semifinal	Final	
Athlete	Event	Time	Rank	Time	Rank	Best	Seed	Position	Position	Position	Position	Rank
Anton Lindfors	Men's snowboard cross	1:15.01	23	Bye		1:15.01	23	3 Q	3 Q	5 FB	3	9

Qualification legend: FA – Qualify to medal final; FB – Qualify to consolation final

== Speed skating ==
Athlete	Event	Final	
Athlete	Event	Time	Rank
Pekka Koskela	Men's 500 m	35.192	19
Pekka Koskela	Men's 1000 m	1:11.76	36
Mika Poutala	Men's 500 m	34.68	4
Mika Poutala	Men's 1000 m	1:09.58	16
Elina Risku	Women's 500 m	39.36	28

== See also ==
Finland at the 2018 Winter Paralympics
