= FIS Freestyle Ski and Snowboarding World Championships 2021 – Men's snowboard slopestyle =

Men's snowboard slopestyle at the FIS Freestyle Ski and Snowboarding World Championships 2021
- Venue: Aspen/Snowmass
- Location: Aspen, United States
- Date: 10 March (qualification); 12 March
- Competitors: 54 from 28 nations
- Winning points: 90.66

Medalists
| gold medal | Marcus Kleveland | Norway |
| silver medal | Sébastien Toutant | Canada |
| bronze medal | Rene Rinnekangas | Finland |

The Men's snowboard slopestyle competition at the FIS Freestyle Ski and Snowboarding World Championships 2021 was held on 12 March. A qualification was held on 10 March 2021.

== Qualification ==
The qualification was started on 10 March at 13:50. The eight best snowboarders from each heat qualified for the final.

=== Heat 1 ===
| Rank | Bib | Start order | Name | Country | Run 1 | Run 2 | Best | Notes |
|---|---|---|---|---|---|---|---|---|
| 1 | 12 | 18 | Leon Vockensperger | Germany | 35.00 | 92.25 | 92.25 | Q |
| 2 | 5 | 4 | Lyon Farrell | United States | 88.50 | 25.00 | 88.50 | Q |
| 3 | 9 | 5 | Hiroaki Kunitake | Japan | 85.00 | 40.50 | 85.00 | Q |
| 4 | 30 | 11 | Casper Wolf | Netherlands | 33.50 | 84.00 | 84.00 | Q |
| 5 | 13 | 15 | Torgeir Bergrem | Norway | 81.75 | 20.00 | 81.75 | Q |
| 6 | 1 | 3 | Red Gerard | United States | 80.25 | 71.75 | 80.25 | Q |
| 7 | 47 | 12 | Naj Mekinc | Slovenia | 78.00 | 55.75 | 78.00 | Q |
| 8 | 21 | 26 | Sebbe De Buck | Belgium | 11.25 | 72.50 | 72.50 | Q |
| 9 | 22 | 21 | Noah Vicktor | Germany | 20.25 | 71.50 | 71.50 | |
| 10 | 39 | 16 | Gabriel Adams | Great Britain | 70.75 | 3.25 | 70.75 | |
| 11 | 25 | 8 | Emiliano Lauzi | Italy | 59.00 | 69.75 | 69.75 | |
| 12 | 16 | 22 | Nicolas Huber | Switzerland | 29.00 | 68.75 | 68.75 | |
| 13 | 35 | 7 | William Mathisen | Sweden | 64.75 | 67.25 | 67.25 | |
| 14 | 50 | 13 | Sébastien Konijnenberg | France | 66.75 | 17.00 | 66.75 | |
| 15 | 46 | 9 | Markus Olimstad | Norway | 62.00 | 52.25 | 62.00 | |
| 16 | 55 | 6 | Augustinho Teixeira | Brazil | 50.25 | 56.00 | 56.00 | |
| 17 | 26 | 28 | Moritz Boll | Switzerland | 49.50 | 19.75 | 49.50 | |
| 18 | 43 | 17 | Billy Cockrell | Great Britain | 47.00 | 9.50 | 47.00 | |
| 19 | 51 | 23 | Anthon Bosch | South Africa | 40.50 | 20.00 | 40.50 | |
| 20 | 34 | 24 | Takeru Otsuka | Japan | 37.00 | 5.00 | 37.00 | |
| 21 | 8 | 2 | Mark McMorris | Canada | 28.25 | 34.25 | 34.25 | |
| 22 | 31 | 14 | Clemens Millauer | Austria | 23.00 | 33.75 | 33.75 | |
| 23 | 38 | 10 | Botond István Fricz | Hungary | 30.50 | 18.00 | 30.50 | |
| 24 | 4 | 1 | Justus Henkes | United States | 16.50 | 28.00 | 28.00 | |
| 25 | 58 | 19 | Pedro Bidegain | Argentina | 9.00 | 26.75 | 26.75 | |
| 26 | 17 | 20 | Moritz Thönen | Switzerland | 21.75 | 17.50 | 21.75 | |
| 27 | 54 | 25 | Federico Chiaradio | Argentina | 17.75 | 16.75 | 17.75 | |
| 28 | 42 | 27 | Marinó Kristjánsson | Iceland | 8.50 | 13.50 | 13.50 | |

=== Heat 2 ===
| Rank | Bib | Start order | Name | Country | Run 1 | Run 2 | Best | Notes |
|---|---|---|---|---|---|---|---|---|
| 1 | 24 | 7 | Marcus Kleveland | Norway | 86.50 | 38.00 | 86.50 | Q |
| 2 | 7 | 3 | Rene Rinnekangas | Finland | 41.75 | 86.00 | 86.00 | Q |
| 3 | 2 | 4 | Dusty Henricksen | United States | 81.75 | 83.50 | 83.50 | Q |
| 4 | 32 | 18 | Sébastien Toutant | Canada | 81.50 | 35.50 | 81.50 | Q |
| 5 | 14 | 21 | Kaito Hamada | Japan | 27.50 | 81.00 | 81.00 | Q |
| 6 | 33 | 20 | Maxence Parrot | Canada | 77.75 | 80.00 | 80.00 | Q |
| 7 | 10 | 5 | Ruki Tobita | Japan | 55.75 | 79.75 | 79.75 | Q |
| 8 | 40 | 19 | Chris Corning | United States | 78.25 | 24.25 | 78.25 | Q |
| 9 | 36 | 22 | Leon Gütl | Germany | 22.75 | 77.75 | 77.75 | |
| 10 | 29 | 12 | Emil Zulian | Italy | 77.00 | 23.50 | 77.00 | |
| 11 | 3 | 1 | Ståle Sandbech | Norway | 21.00 | 75.25 | 75.25 | |
| 12 | 28 | 11 | Mikko Rehnberg | Finland | 62.75 | 72.75 | 72.75 | |
| 12 | 37 | 24 | Samuel Jaroš | Slovakia | 72.75 | 17.00 | 72.75 | |
| 14 | 18 | 13 | Vlad Khadarin | Russian Ski Federation | 72.50 | 63.25 | 72.50 | |
| 15 | 6 | 2 | Sven Thorgren | Sweden | 71.00 | 24.50 | 71.00 | |
| 16 | 41 | 15 | Moritz Amsuess | Austria | 59.25 | 16.50 | 59.25 | |
| 17 | 20 | 10 | Matthew Cox | Australia | 17.75 | 59.00 | 59.00 | |
| 18 | 53 | 16 | Matija Milenković | Serbia | 11.50 | 58.50 | 58.50 | |
| 19 | 52 | 26 | Álvaro Yáñez | Chile | 25.75 | 50.00 | 50.00 | |
| 20 | 56 | 9 | Dante Brčić | Croatia | 15.25 | 48.00 | 48.00 | |
| 21 | 57 | 25 | Motiejus Morauskas | Lithuania | 44.25 | 23.50 | 44.25 | |
| 22 | 45 | 28 | Enzo Valax | France | 31.00 | 33.25 | 33.25 | |
| 23 | 11 | 23 | Liam Brearley | Canada | 32.75 | 17.75 | 32.75 | |
| 24 | 44 | 6 | Jules De Sloover | Belgium | 30.50 | 31.25 | 31.25 | |
| 25 | 23 | 8 | Jonas Boesiger | Switzerland | 24.75 | 13.75 | 24.75 | |
| 26 | 48 | 17 | José Antonio Aragón | Spain | 10.25 | 15.75 | 15.75 | |
| | 15 | 27 | Tiarn Collins | New Zealand | Did not start | | | |
| | 49 | 14 | Alberto Maffei | Italy | Did not start | | | |

== Final ==
The final was started at 09:30.

| Rank | Bib | Start order | Name | Country | Run 1 | Run 2 | Best |
|---|---|---|---|---|---|---|---|
| 1st place, gold medalist(s) | 24 | 15 | Marcus Kleveland | Norway | 86.86 | 90.66 | 90.66 |
| 2nd place, silver medalist(s) | 32 | 9 | Sébastien Toutant | Canada | 82.53 | 65.10 | 82.53 |
| 3rd place, bronze medalist(s) | 7 | 13 | Rene Rinnekangas | Finland | 76.45 | 82.51 | 82.51 |
| 4 | 1 | 6 | Red Gerard | United States | 82.28 | 47.33 | 82.28 |
| 5 | 14 | 7 | Kaito Hamada | Japan | 80.23 | 40.31 | 80.23 |
| 6 | 33 | 5 | Maxence Parrot | Canada | 78.60 | 49.26 | 78.60 |
| 7 | 2 | 11 | Dusty Henricksen | United States | 70.58 | 77.90 | 77.90 |
| 8 | 9 | 12 | Hiroaki Kunitake | Japan | 49.00 | 77.76 | 77.76 |
| 9 | 10 | 4 | Ruki Tobita | Japan | 74.85 | 39.23 | 74.85 |
| 10 | 12 | 16 | Leon Vockensperger | Germany | 74.21 | 57.41 | 74.21 |
| 11 | 40 | 2 | Chris Corning | United States | 72.41 | 51.05 | 72.41 |
| 12 | 5 | 14 | Lyon Farrell | United States | 50.85 | 70.63 | 70.63 |
| 13 | 21 | 1 | Sebbe De Buck | Belgium | 47.56 | 63.33 | 63.33 |
| 14 | 30 | 10 | Casper Wolf | Netherlands | 61.43 | 49.93 | 61.43 |
| 15 | 13 | 8 | Torgeir Bergrem | Norway | 43.93 | 30.96 | 43.93 |
| 16 | 47 | 3 | Naj Mekinc | Slovenia | 25.03 | 31.46 | 31.46 |
