= FIS Freestyle Ski and Snowboarding World Championships 2021 – Men's snowboard big air =

Men's snowboard big air at the 2021 World Championships

Men's snowboard big air at the FIS Freestyle Ski and Snowboarding World Championships 2021
- Venue: Aspen/Snowmass
- Location: Aspen, United States
- Date: 14 March (qualification); 16 March
- Competitors: 57 from 28 nations
- Winning points: 179.25

Medalists
gold medal	Mark McMorris	Canada
silver medal	Maxence Parrot	Canada
bronze medal	Marcus Kleveland	Norway

The Men's snowboard big air competition at the FIS Freestyle Ski and Snowboarding World Championships 2021 was held on 16 March. A qualification was held on 14 March 2021.

== Qualification ==
The qualification was started on 14 March at 09:40. The six best snowboarders from each heat qualified for the final.

=== Heat 1 ===
Rank	Bib	Start order	Name	Country	Run 1	Run 2	Best	Notes
1	13	15	Rene Rinnekangas	Finland	90.00	76.00	90.00	Q
2	8	2	Justus Henkes	United States	15.75	86.50	86.50	Q
3	22	28	Kaito Hamada	Japan	85.25	46.50	85.25	Q
4	15	8	Ruki Tobita	Japan	17.50	84.50	84.50	Q
5	26	16	Emiliano Lauzi	Italy	83.00	84.25	84.25	Q
6	28	25	Matthew Cox	Australia	81.75	83.50	83.50	Q
7	17	29	Liam Brearley	Canada	69.25	82.75	82.75	
8	55	19	Alberto Maffei	Italy	81.50	13.00	81.50	
9	9	1	Nicolas Huber	Switzerland	74.25	80.50	80.50	
10	44	17	Sébastien Toutant	Canada	80.25	23.00	80.25	
11	4	5	Chris Corning	United States	78.25	21.00	78.25	
12	19	26	Leon Vockensperge	Germany	75.50	25.75	75.50	
13	51	7	Jules De Sloover	Belgium	74.75	46.50	74.75	
14	31	9	Vlad Khadarin	Russian Ski Federation	74.00	26.25	74.00	
15	49	21	Botond István Fricz	Hungary	71.25	47.00	71.25	
16	27	13	Moritz Thönen	Switzerland	70.75	23.00	70.75	
17	1	3	Red Gerard	United States	69.00	70.50	70.50	
18	18	14	Matija Milenković	Serbia	68.25	8.50	68.25	
19	5	4	Sven Thorgren	Sweden	18.25	65.75	65.75	
20	24	22	Moritz Amsuess	Austria	64.50	22.50	64.50	
21	47	18	Pedro Bidegain	Argentina	53.75	6.00	53.75	
22	41	20	Loris Framarin	Italy	52.75	15.50	52.75	
23	45	12	Motiejus Morauskas	Lithuania	47.50	18.00	47.50	
24	57	10	Álvaro Yáñez	Chile	44.50	34.50	44.50	
25	35	6	Sebbe De Buck	Belgium	28.75	41.50	41.50	
26	51	11	Marinó Kristjánsson	Iceland	34.00	36.00	36.00	
27	12	24	Jonas Boesiger	Switzerland	18.50	19.75	19.75	
28	33	27	José Antonio Aragón	Spain	9.00	8.25	9.00	
29	36	23	Dante Brčić	Croatia	4.00	DNS	4.00	

=== Heat 2 ===
Rank	Bib	Start order	Name	Country	Run 1	Run 2	Best	Notes
1	7	4	Mark McMorris	Canada	92.75	63.50	92.75	Q
2	2	2	Maxence Parrot	Canada	90.50	22.25	90.50	Q
3	39	9	Marcus Kleveland	Norway	20.75	88.75	88.75	Q
4	32	8	Niklas Mattsson	Sweden	18.50	84.50	84.50	Q
5	6	5	Ståle Sandbech	Norway	79.75	84.25	84.25	Q
6	38	28	Leon Gütl	Germany	83.50	54.50	83.50	Q
7	10	3	Lyon Farrell	United States	83.00	18.50	83.00	
8	30	29	Clemens Millauer	Austria	17.50	80.25	80.25	
9	37	10	Noah Vicktor	Germany	77.75	78.50	78.50	
10	3	1	Dusty Henricksen	United States	76.75	71.25	76.75	
11	53	12	Billy Cockrell	Great Britain	16.00	73.25	73.25	
12	21	13	Torgeir Bergrem	Norway	72.75	37.25	72.75	
13	46	7	William Mathisen	Sweden	46.25	70.00	70.00	
14	48	11	Samuel Jaroš	Slovakia	68.75	34.25	68.75	
15	54	26	Markus Olimstad	Norway	11.50	63.50	63.50	
16	40	6	Emil Zulian	Italy	50.00	20.25	50.00	
17	25	19	Gabriel Adams	Great Britain	13.75	49.50	49.50	
18	11	23	Moritz Boll	Switzerland	18.25	49.25	49.25	
19	14	27	Hiroaki Kunitake	Japan	19.50	43.75	43.75	
20	34	24	Takeru Otsuka	Japan	43.50	26.00	43.50	
21	43	17	Casper Wolf	Netherlands	39.25	20.00	39.25	
22	58	18	Augustinho Teixeira	Brazil	32.50	24.75	32.50	
23	56	14	Federico Chiaradio	Argentina	22.25	15.00	22.25	
24	42	25	Mikko Rehnberg	Finland	21.50	17.75	21.50	
25	20	20	Naj Mekinc	Slovenia	18.00	21.25	21.25	
26	16	15	Sebastien Konijnenberg	France	16.50	14.75	16.50	
27	29	22	Enzo Valax	France	15.75	DNS	15.75	
28	50	16	Anthon Bosch	South Africa	9.75	7.75	9.75	
	23	20	Tiarn Collins	New Zealand	Did not start			

== Final ==
The final was started on 16 March at 13:30.

Rank	Bib	Start order	Name	Country	Run 1	Run 2	Run 3	Total
1st place, gold medalist(s)	1	12	Mark McMorris	Canada	92.75	86.50	3.50	179.25
2nd place, silver medalist(s)	3	10	Maxence Parrot	Canada	89.50	63.25	88.75	178.25
3rd place, bronze medalist(s)	5	8	Marcus Kleveland	Norway	24.75	78.50	97.75	176.25
4	8	5	Ruki Tobita	Japan	90.50	76.00	42.25	166.50
5	6	7	Kaito Hamada	Japan	85.00	81.25	14.50	166.25
6	10	3	Emiliano Lauzi	Italy	80.75	36.75	80.00	160.75
7	4	9	Justus Henkes	United States	78.75	15.25	73.25	152.00
8	9	4	Ståle Sandbech	Norway	72.50	64.00	61.75	136.50
9	2	11	Rene Rinnekangas	Finland	86.25	28.50	30.25	116.50
10	12	1	Matthew Cox	Australia	19.00	46.75	64.75	111.50
11	7	6	Niklas Mattsson	Sweden	62.00	90.75	14.00	104.75
12	11	2	Leon Gütl	Germany	76.25	15.00	14.25	91.25
