= Lauzi =

Lauzi is an Italian surname from Milan. Notable people with the surname include:

- Bruno Lauzi (1937–2006), Italian singer-songwriter, poet and writer
- Emiliano Lauzi (born 1994), Italian snowboarder
