= Venla Lehtonen =

Finnish biathlete (born 1995)

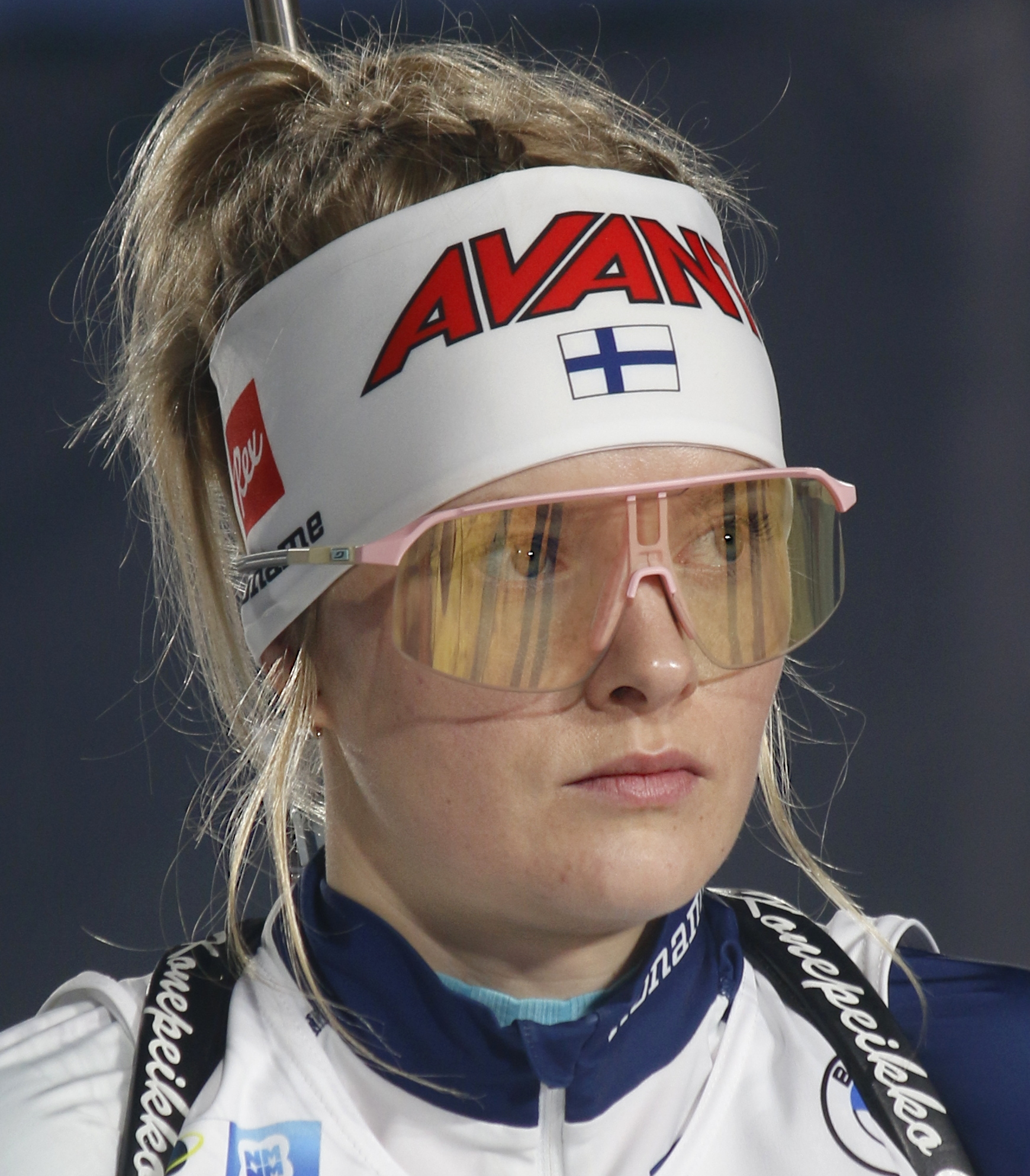
- Lehtonen in 2024

Personal information
- Born: 10 March 1995 (age 31) Imatra, Finland
- Height: 167 cm (5 ft 6 in)
- Weight: 53 kg (117 lb)

Sport
- Sport: Biathlon

Venla Lehtonen (born 10 March 1995) is a Finnish biathlete. She competed in the 2018 Winter Olympics.

== Career ==
Lehtonen began her athletic career in cross-country skiing, competing in national championships in Finland. Lehtonen made her international debut on 2 March 2017, during the 2016/17 IBU Cup season at a competition held in Kontiolahti, Finland. She participated in the individual, sprint, and pursuit events, but finished outside the points standings in all three races. At the start of the 2017/18 season, Lehtonen competed in the opening IBU Cup races in Sjusjøen, Norway. Following these performances, she was promoted to the Finnish World Cup team. Her first World Cup race took place in Hochfilzen, Austria, in mid-December 2017. In the sprint event, she recorded five shooting misses and finished 95th, missing both the pursuit qualification and points standings. Lehtonen achieved her first World Cup top-10 finish in early January 2018 in Oberhof, as part of the Finnish women's relay team. Competing alongside Kaisa Mäkäräinen, Mari Laukkanen, and Laura Toivanen, she helped secure a 7th-place finish, marking the best result for a Finnish women's relay team since the 6th place at the 2003 Biathlon World Championships. Lehtonen made her Olympic debut at the 2018 Winter Olympics in Pyeongchang. She competed in the sprint event, finishing 79th, and was part of the Finnish women's relay team that secured 15th place. In December 2024, Lehtonen achieved a career-best performance by finishing 7th in the pursuit event at the Biathlon World Cup in Annecy, France.

== Biathlon results ==
All results are sourced from the International Biathlon Union.

=== Olympic Games ===
0 medals

Event	Individual	Sprint	Pursuit	Mass start	Relay	Mixed relay
(South Korea) 2018 Pyeongchang	—	79th	—	—	15th	—
(Italy) 2026 Milano Cortina	79th	63rd	—	—	7th	—

=== World Championships ===
0 medals

Event	Individual	Sprint	Pursuit	Mass start	Relay	Mixed relay	Single mixed relay
(Sweden) 2019 Östersund	74th	45th	49th	—	22nd	10th	—
(Slovenia) 2021 Pokljuka	DNF	—	—	—	—	—	—
(Germany) 2023 Oberhof	—	DNF	—	—	—	—	—
(Czech Republic) 2024 Nové Město na Moravě	48th	52nd	40th	—	17th	20th	—

*During Olympic seasons competitions are only held for those events not included in the Olympic program.

=== World Cup ===
Season	Overall			Individual		Sprint		Pursuit		Mass start	
Season	Races	Points	Position	Points	Position	Points	Position	Points	Position	Points	Position
2017–18	7/22	Did not earn World Cup points									
2018–19	10/25	5	96th	5	66th	—	—	—	—	—	—
2019–20	1/21	Did not earn World Cup points									
2020–21	7/26	Did not earn World Cup points									
2021–22	3/22	Did not earn World Cup points									
2022–23	8/20	1	87th	—	—	1	79th	—	—	—	—
2023–24	6/21	Did not earn World Cup points									
