= Kaito Hamada =

Japanese snowboarder (born 1999)

Personal information
- Nationality: Japanese
- Born: 14 October 1999 (age 26) Sapporo, Japan

Sport
- Sport: Snowboarding
- Event(s): Big air, Slopestyle

Kaito Hamada (born 14 October 1999) is a Japanese snowboarder. He competed at the 2022 Winter Olympics.

== Career ==
Hamada competed at the 2021 World Championships in the big air and slopestyle events, where he finished in fifth place in both events.

He represented Japan at the 2022 Winter Olympics in the slopestyle event and finished in eighth place.
