= Snowboarding at the 2020 Winter Youth Olympics – Boys' slopestyle =

Boys' slopestyle at the III Winter Youth Olympic Games
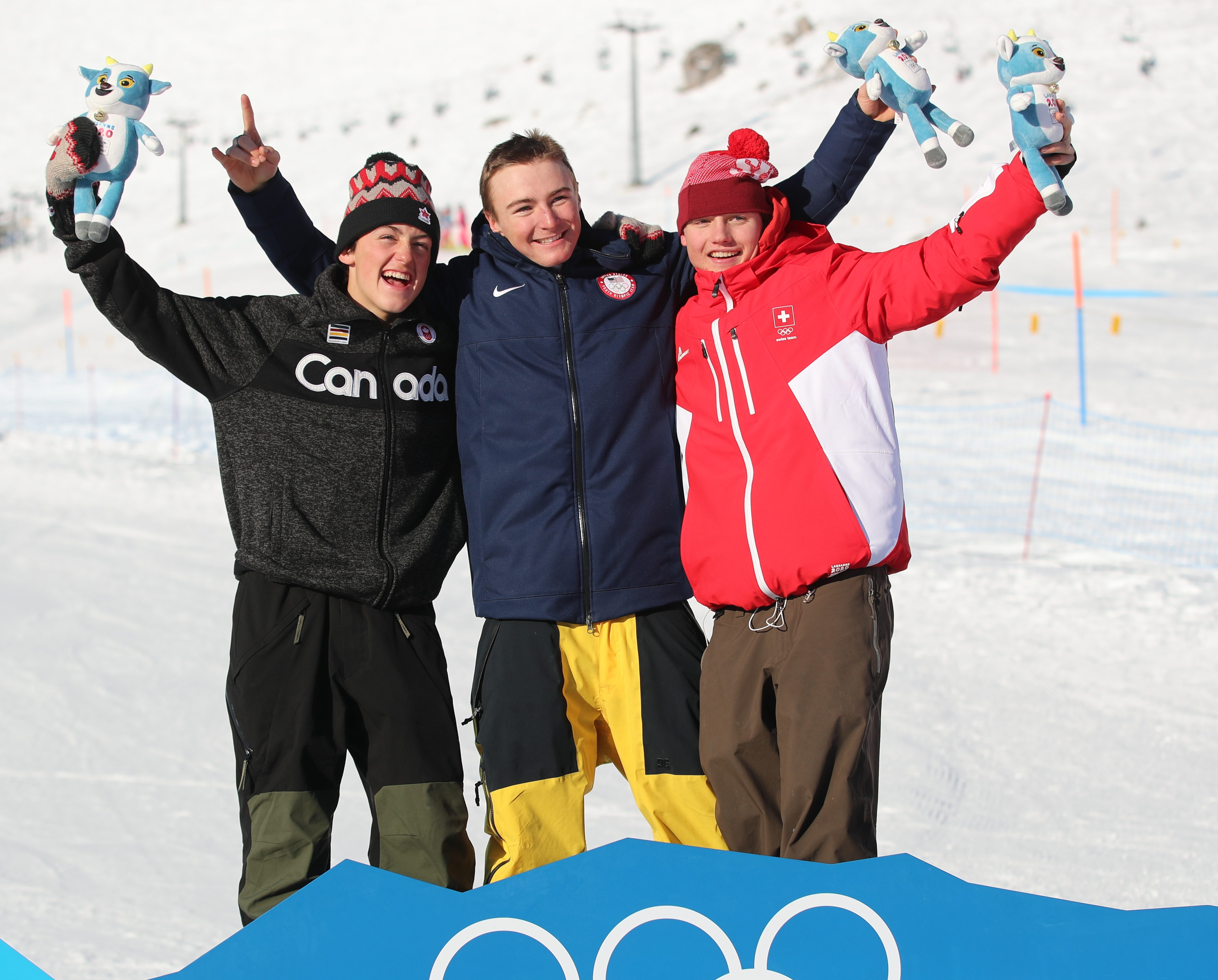
- Venue: Leysin Park & Pipe
- Dates: 20 January
- Competitors: 22 from 15 nations
- Winning points: 96.33

Medalists
1st place, gold medalist(s)		Dusty Henricksen	United States
2nd place, silver medalist(s)		Liam Brearley	Canada
3rd place, bronze medalist(s)		Nick Pünter	Switzerland

The boys' slopestyle event in snowboarding at the 2020 Winter Youth Olympics took place on 20 January at the Leysin Park & Pipe.

== Qualification ==
The qualification was started at 09:30.

Rank	Bib	Name	Country	Run 1	Run 2	Best	Notes
1	3	Aoto Kawakami	Japan	77.66	89.33	89.33	Q
2	4	Dusty Henricksen	United States	84.66	21.00	84.66	Q
3	24	Valtteri Kautonen	Finland	83.00	22.66	83.00	Q
4	6	Liam Brearley	Canada	81.00	9.00	81.00	Q
5	17	Nick Pünter	Switzerland	79.66	34.33	79.66	Q
6	21	Liam Gill	Canada	69.00	17.00	69.00	Q
7	1	Álvaro Yáñez	Chile	28.66	67.33	67.33	Q
8	2	William Buffey	Canada	59.33	65.00	65.00	Q
9	16	William Mathisen	Sweden	63.66	64.66	64.66	Q
10	25	Jack Coyne	United States	58.33	63.33	63.33	Q
11	12	Leopold Frey	Germany	51.00	7.66	51.00	Q
12	9	Mitchell Davern	New Zealand	12.00	50.00	50.00	Q
13	8	Sunny Steele	Australia	49.00	5.33	49.00	
14	15	Alessandro Lotorto	Switzerland	40.66	20.33	40.66	
15	5	Ryoma Kimata	Japan	32.33	35.66	35.66	
16	19	Yaroslav Lenchevskiy	Russia	24.33	11.33	24.33	
17	10	Motiejus Morauskas	Lithuania	15.66	23.00	23.00	
18	7	Will Healy	United States	DNS	14.33	14.33	
19	23	Ožbe Kuhar	Slovenia	13.33	13.00	13.33	
20	18	Valentín Moreno	Argentina	12.33	2.33	12.33	
21	11	Till Strohmeyer	Germany	10.00	4.00	10.00	
22	13	Lukas Frischhut	Austria	4.66	4.00	4.66	
	14	Benjamin Yáñez	Chile	Did not start			
	20	Øyvind Kirkhus	Norway	Did not start			
	22	Aatu Partanen	Finland	Did not start			

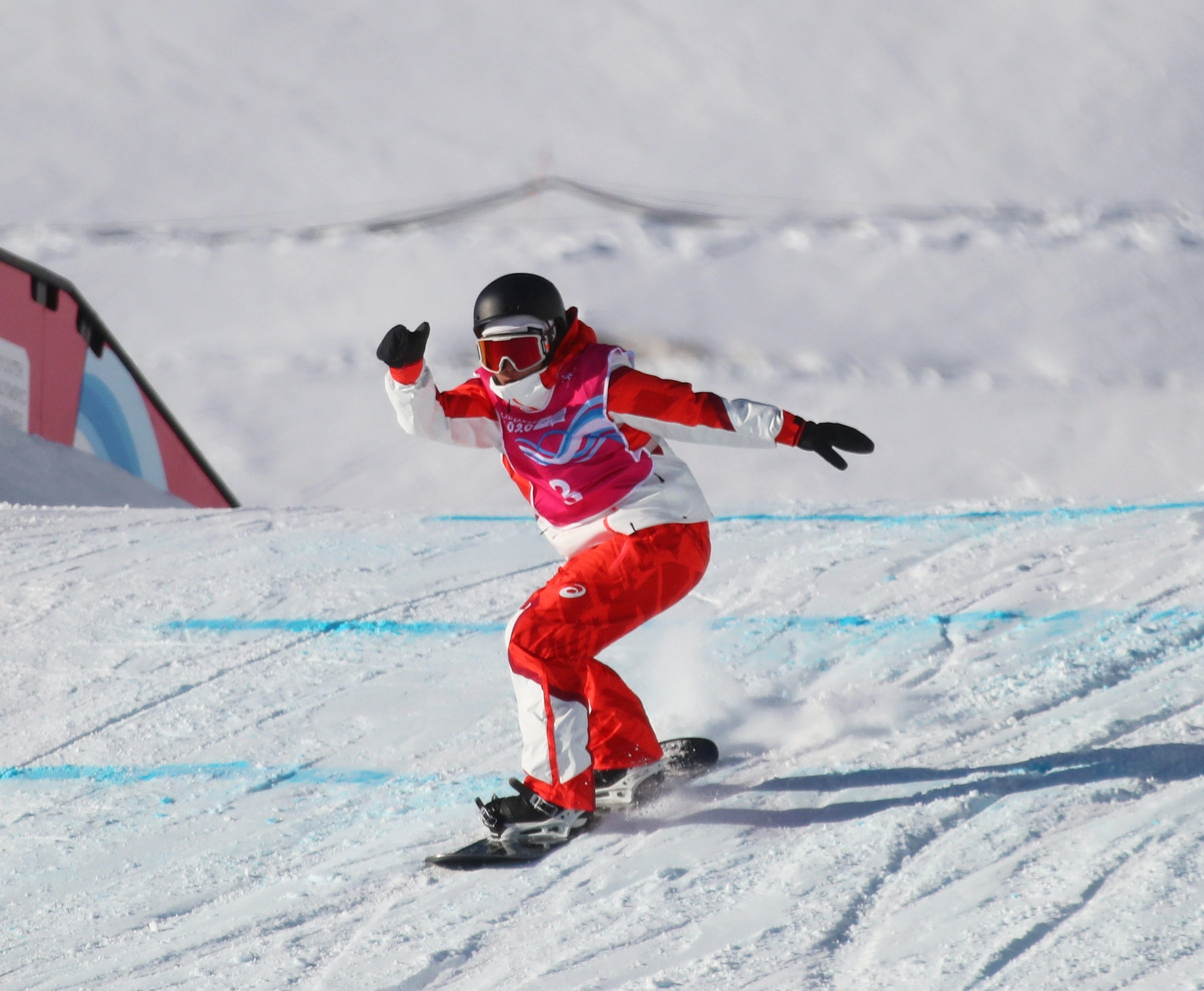
Aoto Kawakami

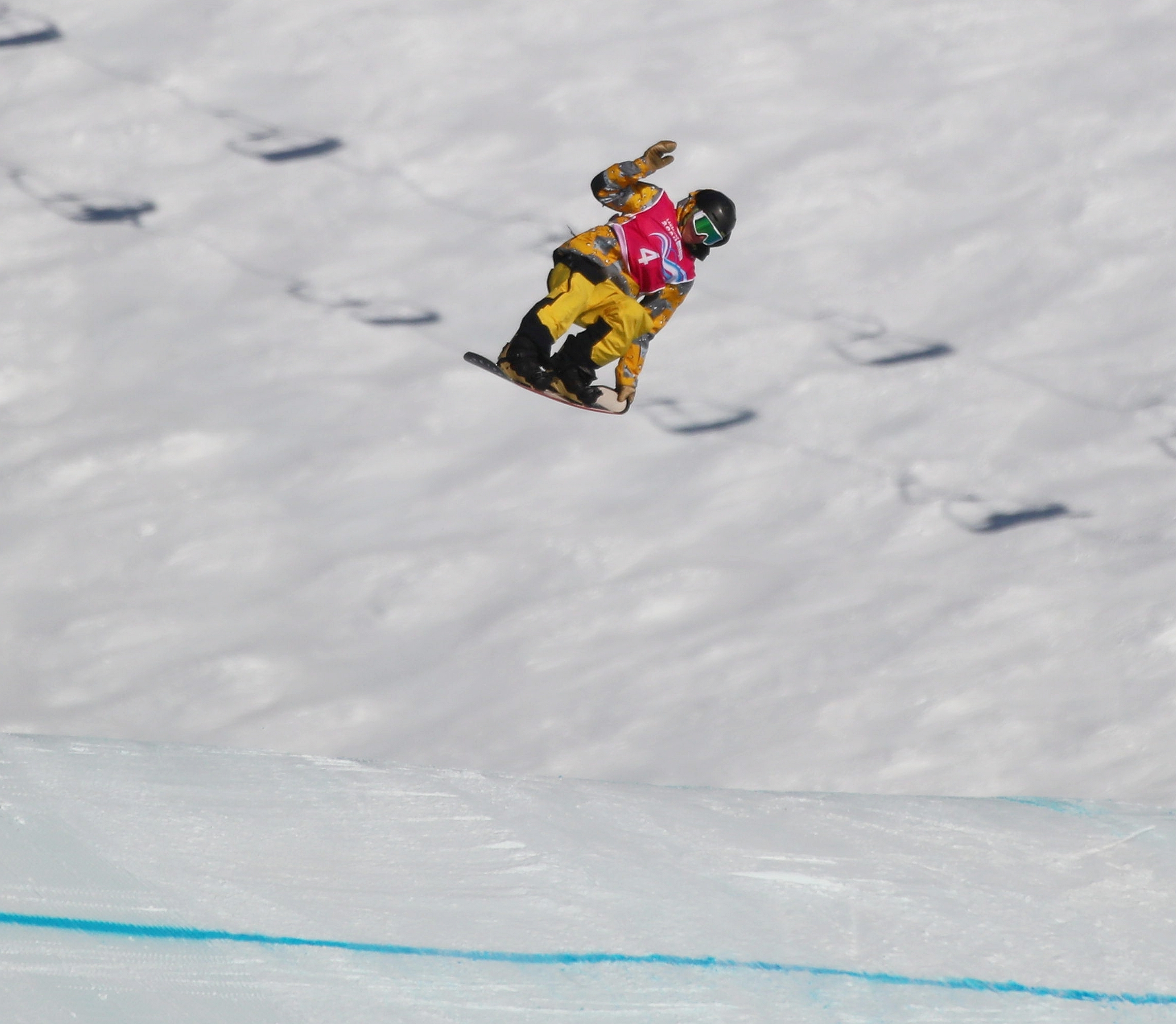
Dusty Henricksen

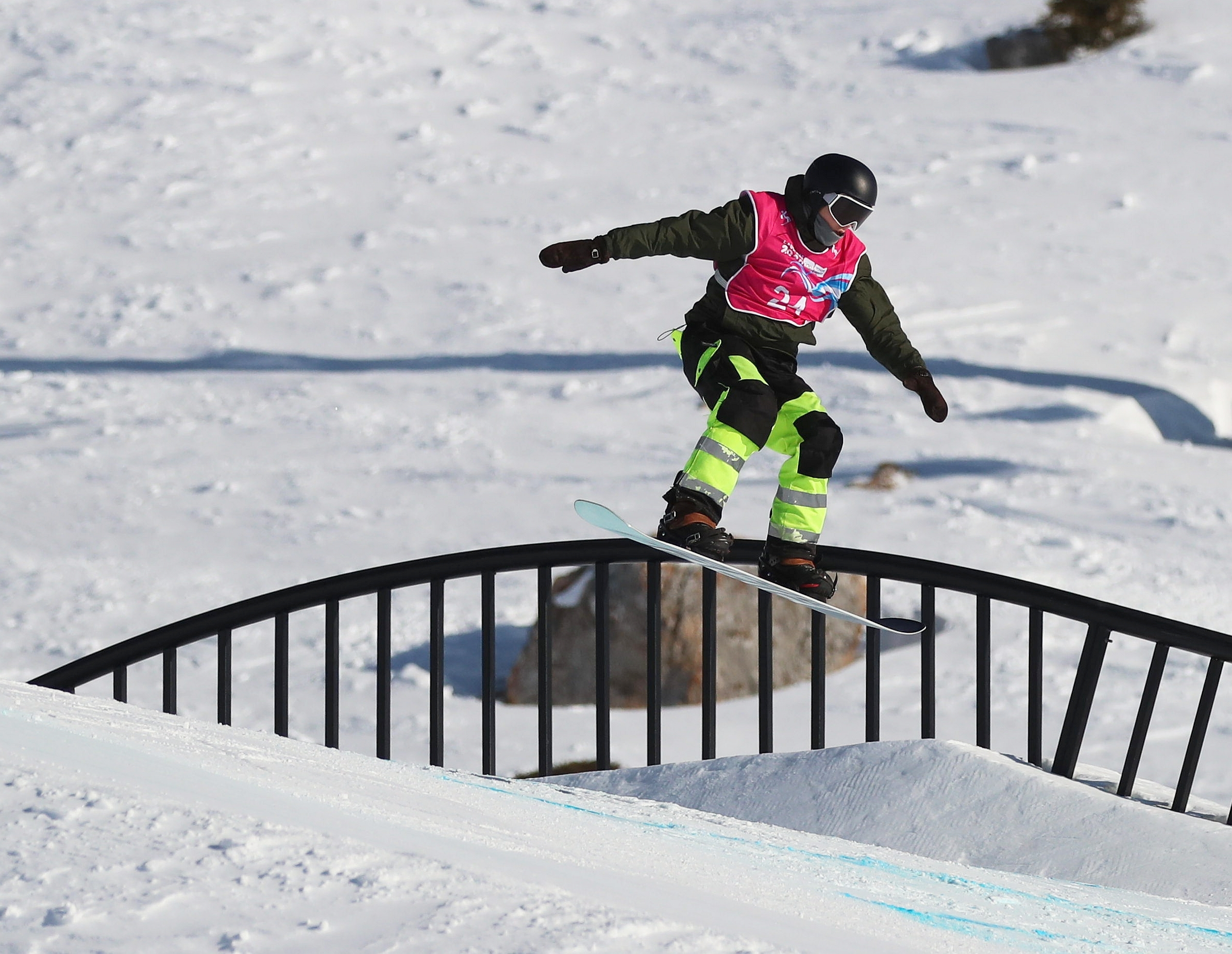
Valtteri Kautonen

== Final ==
The qualification was started at 13:55.

Rank	Start order	Bib	Name	Country	Run 1	Run 2	Run 3	Best
1st place, gold medalist(s)	11	4	Dusty Henricksen	United States	94.00	96.33	27.00	96.33
2nd place, silver medalist(s)	9	6	Liam Brearley	Canada	85.33	64.00	39.00	85.33
3rd place, bronze medalist(s)	8	17	Nick Pünter	Switzerland	28.00	25.33	66.33	66.33
4	12	3	Aoto Kawakami	Japan	63.33	22.00	55.00	63.33
5	4	16	William Mathisen	Sweden	51.66	22.33	34.00	51.66
6	2	12	Leopold Frey	Germany	41.66	16.00	40.00	41.66
7	10	24	Valtteri Kautonen	Finland	32.66	28.66	36.00	36.00
8	3	25	Jack Coyne	United States	34.33	34.00	30.33	34.33
9	6	1	Álvaro Yáñez	Chile	18.00	31.00	19.00	31.00
10	1	9	Mitchell Davern	New Zealand	24.33	20.66	10.00	24.33
11	7	21	Liam Gill	Canada	21.00	23.33	18.66	23.33
	5	2	William Buffey	Canada	Did not start			

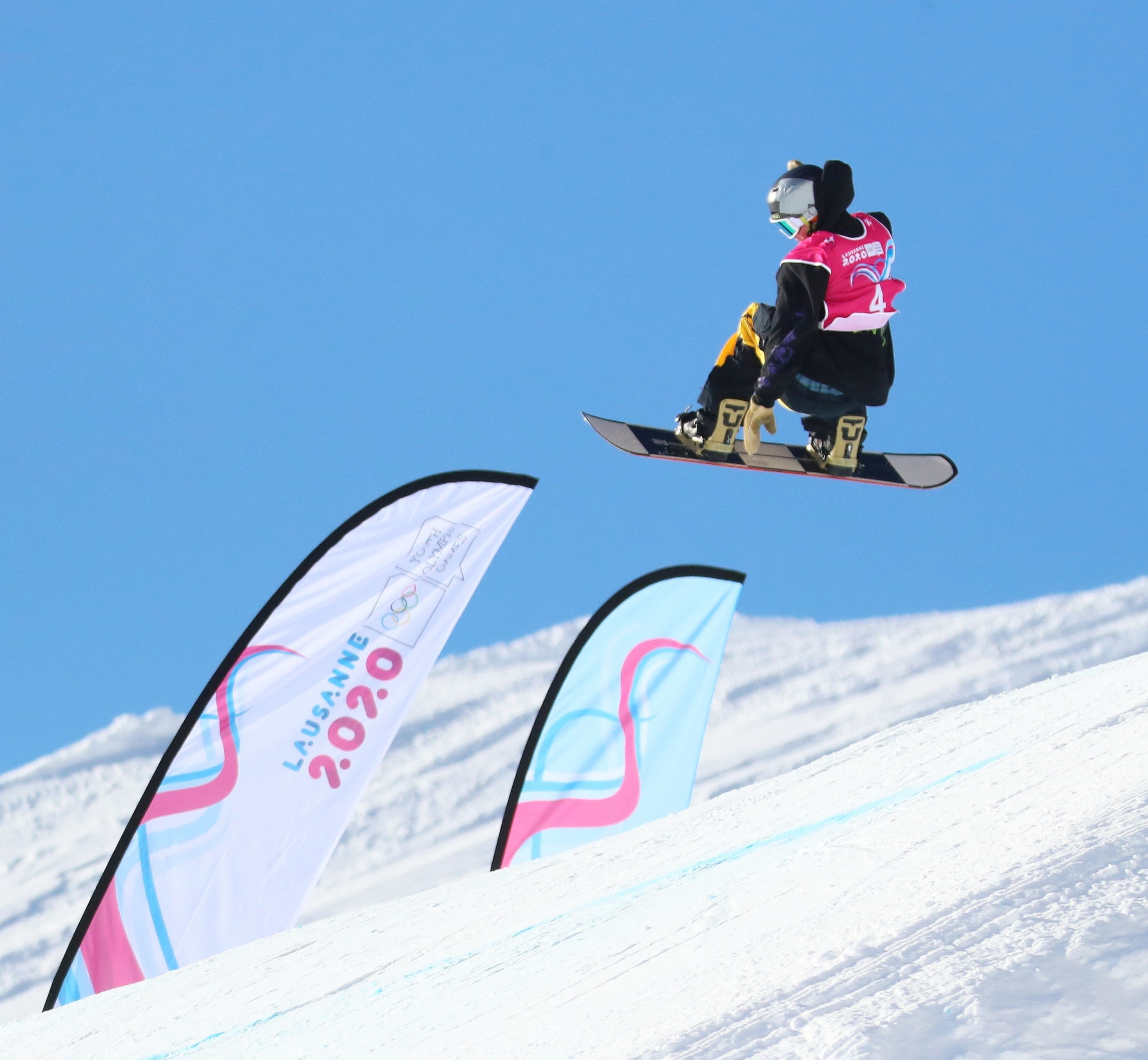
Dusty Henricksen

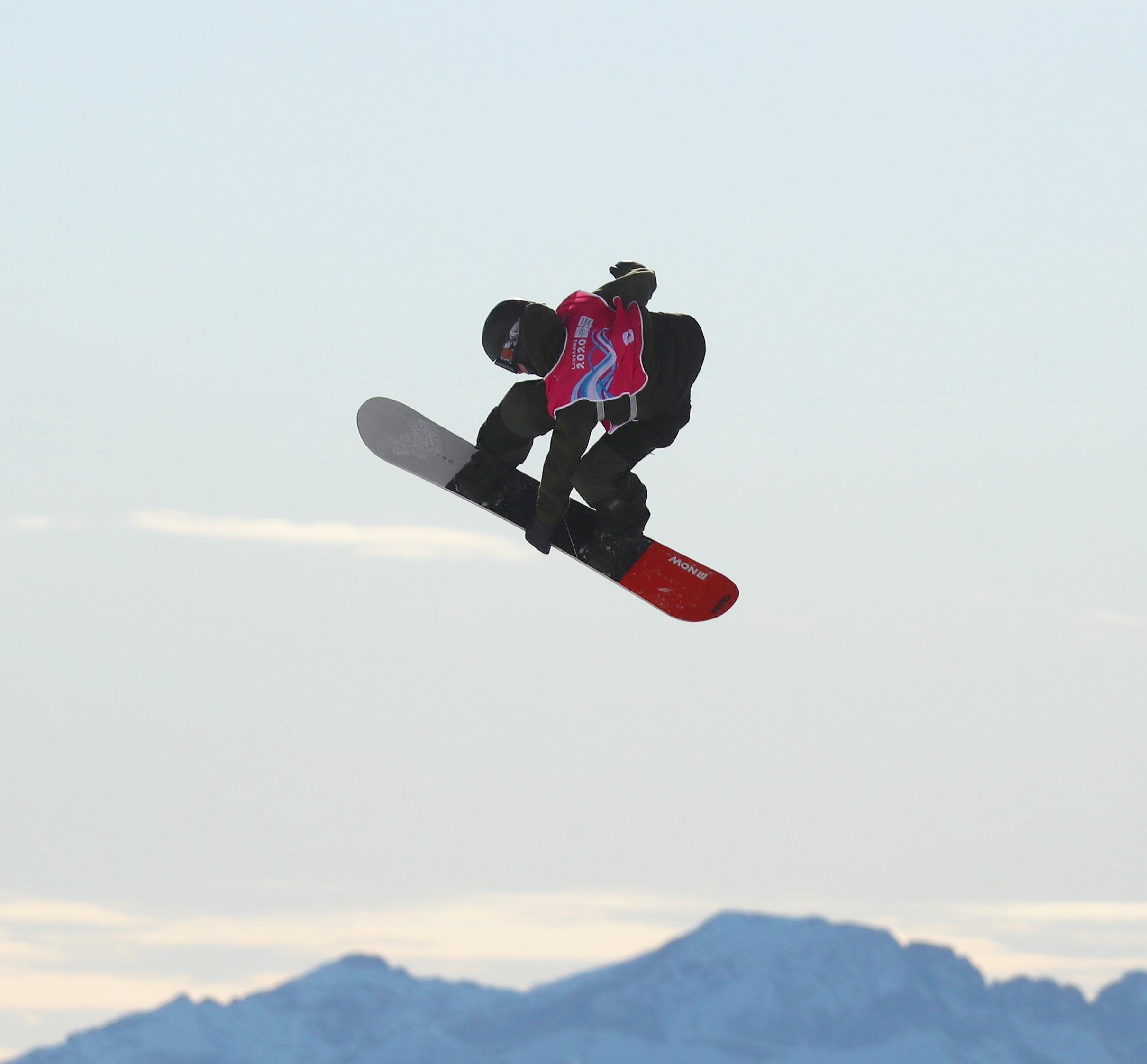
Liam Brearley

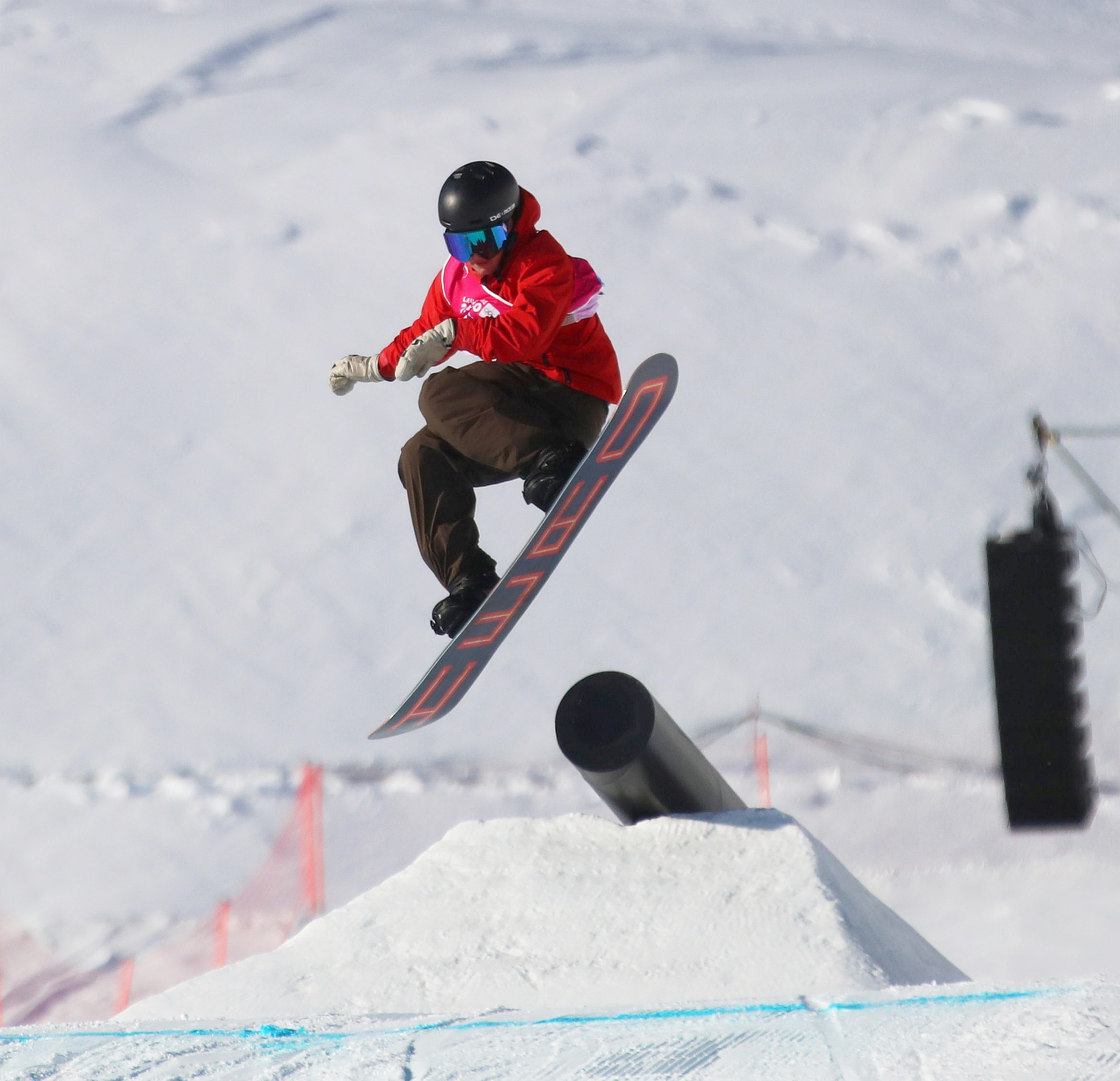
Nick Pünter
