= Winter X Games XXV =

2021 extreme sports tournament

- Venue: Buttermilk Ski Resort
- Location: Aspen, United States
- Dates: 29-31 January 2021

Winter X Games XXV was held from 29 to 31 January 2021 in Aspen, Colorado, United States.

== Medal table ==
Rank	Nation	Gold	Silver	Bronze	Total
1	United States (USA)	6	2	2	10
2	China (CHN)	2	0	1	3
3	Switzerland (SUI)	2	0	0	2
4	Norway (NOR)	1	2	1	4
5	Japan (JPN)	1	1	2	4
6	New Zealand (NZL)	1	1	1	3
7	Sweden (SWE)	1	1	0	2
8	Canada (CAN)	0	2	4	6
9	Australia (AUS)	0	1	0	1
9	France (FRA)	0	1	0	1
9	Great Britain (GBR)	0	1	0	1
12	Finland (FIN)	0	0	1	1
Totals (12 entries)		14	12	12	38

== Medal summary ==
=== Snowboard ===
Event	Gold	Silver	Bronze
Men's Slopestyle	Dusty Henricksen; United States	Mons Røisland; Norway	Rene Rinnekangas; Finland
Men's SuperPipe	Yuto Totsuka; Japan	Scotty James; Australia	Ruka Hirano; Japan
Men's Big Air	Marcus Kleveland; Norway	Sven Thorgren; Sweden	Mons Røisland; Norway
Women's Slopestyle	Jamie Anderson; United States	Zoi Sadowski-Synnott; New Zealand	Laurie Blouin; Canada
Women's SuperPipe	Chloe Kim; United States	Maddie Mastro; United States	Haruna Matsumoto; Japan
Women's Big Air	Jamie Anderson; United States	Miyabi Onitsuka; Japan	Zoi Sadowski-Synnott; New Zealand
Knuckle Huck	Dusty Henricksen; United States	Only gold awarded	Only gold awarded

=== Ski ===
Event	Gold	Silver	Bronze
Men's SuperPipe	Nico Porteous; New Zealand	Aaron Blunck; United States	Birk Irving; United States
Men's Big Air	Andri Ragettli; Switzerland	Antoine Adelisse; France	Alex Hall; United States
Men's Slopestyle	Nick Goepper; United States	Ferdinand Dahl; Norway	Evan McEachran; Canada
Women's SuperPipe	Eileen Gu; China	Cassie Sharpe; Canada	Rachael Karker; Canada
Women's Big Air	Mathilde Gremaud; Switzerland	Megan Oldham; Canada	Eileen Gu; China
Women's Slopestyle	Eileen Gu; China	Isabel Atkin; Great Britain	Megan Oldham; Canada
Knuckle Huck	Henrik Harlaut; Sweden	Only gold awarded	Only gold awarded

=== Rocket League ===
Event	Gold	Silver	Bronze
RLCS X Games	Rogue; United States	NRG; United States	Spacestation Gaming; United States

Ref
