= Mikko Koskinen =

Finnish ice hockey player (born 1988)

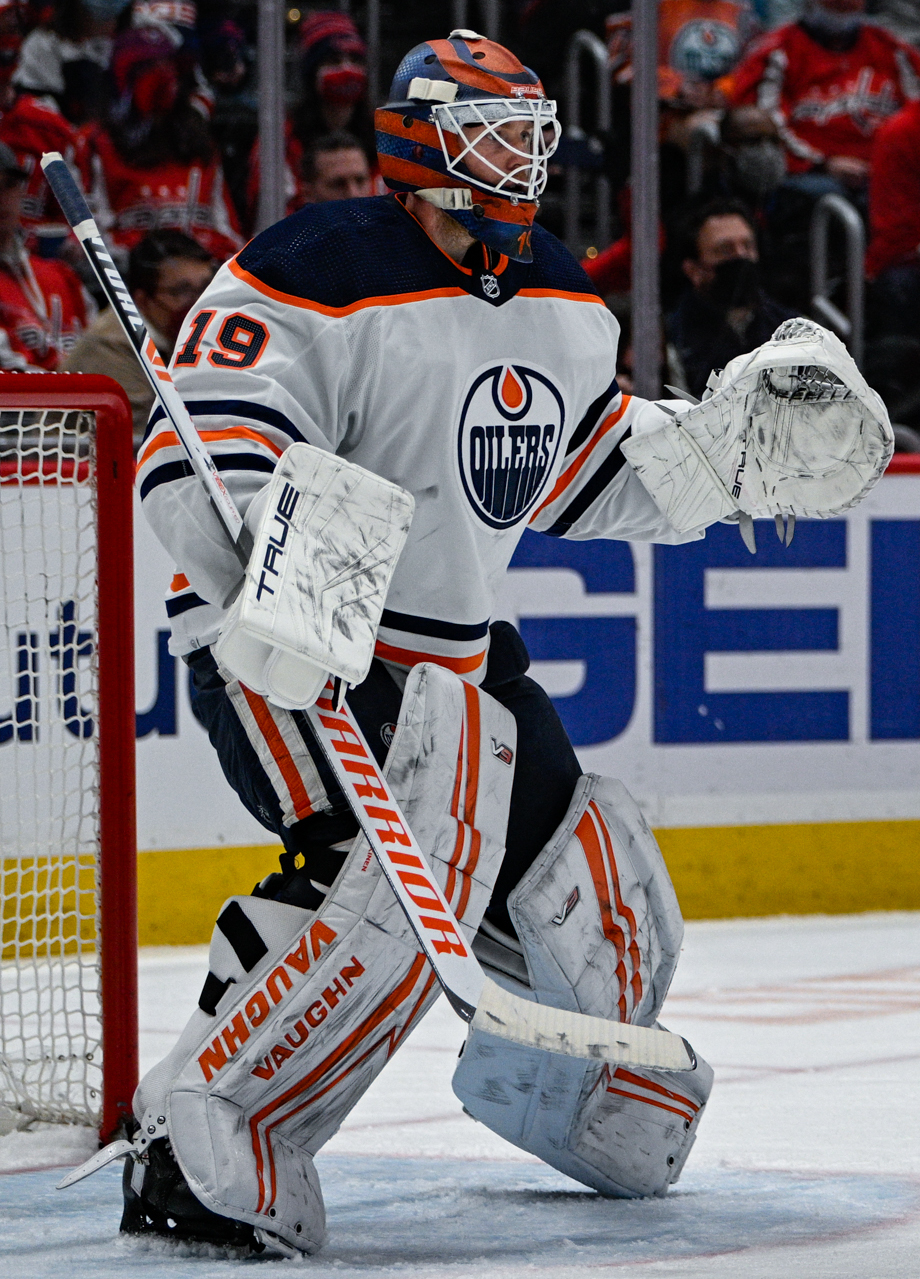
- Koskinen with the Edmonton Oilers in 2022
- Born: 18 July 1988 (age 38) Vantaa, Finland
- Height: 6 ft 7 in (201 cm)
- Weight: 209 lb (95 kg; 14 st 13 lb)
- Position: Goaltender
- Caught: Left
- Played for: Espoo Blues; New York Islanders; KalPa; Sibir Novosibirsk; SKA Saint Petersburg; Edmonton Oilers; HC Lugano
- National team: Finland
- NHL draft: 31st overall, 2009; New York Islanders
- Playing career: 2008–2024

Mikko Koskinen (born 18 July 1988) is a Finnish former professional ice hockey goaltender. Koskinen was drafted in the second round, 31st overall, in the 2009 NHL entry draft by the New York Islanders. Koskinen is one of the tallest goalies ever to play in the National Hockey League (NHL), standing at 6 feet 7 inches (201 cm).

== Playing career ==
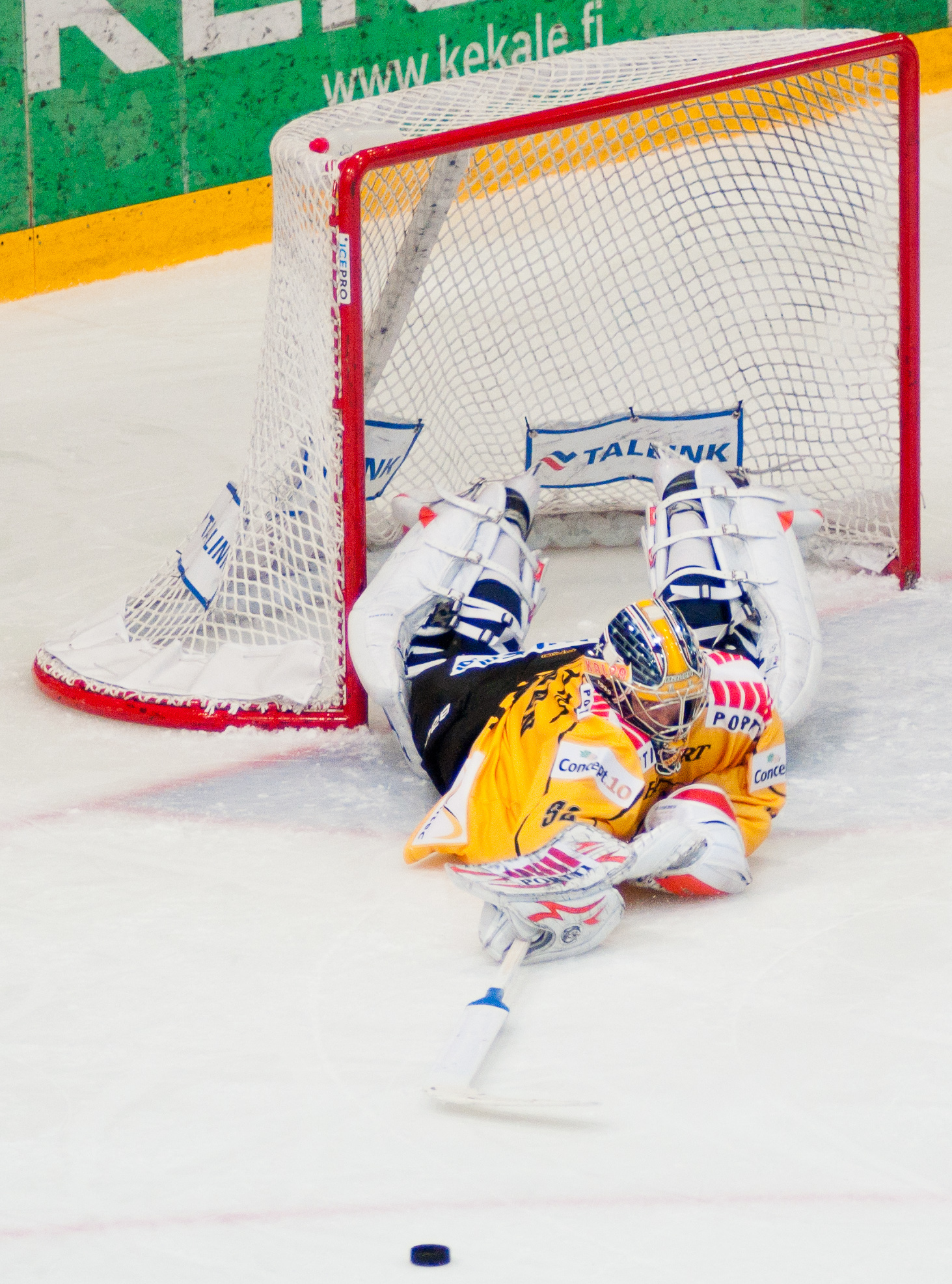
Koskinen with KalPa in 2011

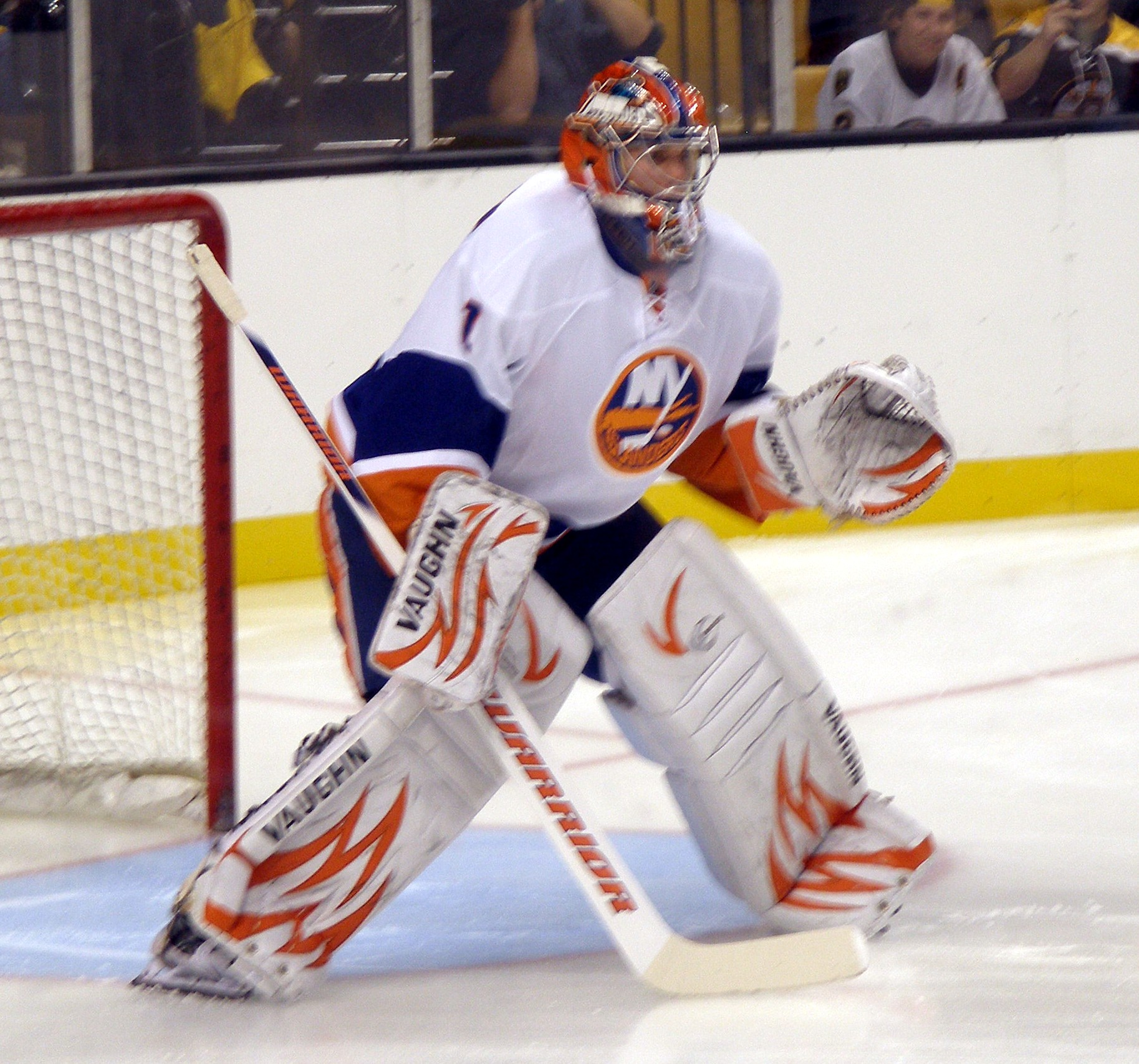
Koskinen with New York Islanders

Koskinen was drafted 31st overall by the New York Islanders in the 2009 NHL entry draft after playing for the Espoo Blues in the Finnish SM-liiga. He was the first goalie and first Finnish player selected that year. Prior to the draft, he was the second-ranked European goaltender by NHL Central Scouting Bureau.

On 13 July 2009, Koskinen signed a three-year entry-level contract with the New York Islanders. In the 2009–10 season, his first in North America, Koskinen was assigned to the Islanders affiliate, the Bridgeport Sound Tigers, to start the year. After only two appearances with the Sound Tigers, he suffered a torn labrum in his hip which required surgery and ruled him out for the majority of the season. On 19 March 2010, after four months of rehab, Koskinen was reassigned to the secondary Islanders affiliate, the Utah Grizzlies, for the remainder of the year. Undefeated in six starts, he helped the Grizzlies reach the conference semi-finals before returning to the Sound Tigers' first-round playoff series on 18 April 2010.

Koskinen made his National Hockey League (NHL) debut on 8 February 2011 against the Toronto Maple Leafs as the Islanders lost 5–3. He earned his first career NHL win two days later in a 4–3 shootout victory over the Montreal Canadiens.

On 12 November 2011, Koskinen returned to Finland, signing with KalPa.

In April 2013, Koskinen signed with the Espoo Blues.

In September 2013, Koskinen left Finland to play for Sibir Novosibirsk in the Kontinental Hockey League (KHL). Part way through the 2014–15 season he was traded to SKA Saint Petersburg for fellow goaltender Alexander Salák. Koskinen and his team went on to win the Gagarin Cup, the KHL championship trophy in April 2015 and 2017.

On 1 May 2018, Koskinen agreed to terms on a one-year, $2.5 million contract with the Edmonton Oilers of the NHL. On 21 January 2019, the Oilers signed Koskinen to a three-year, $13.5 million extension. The decision to sign Koskinen for three years based on such a short tenure was considered unusual, and many speculated that it was a cause of the dismissal of controversial Oilers general manager Peter Chiarelli days later.

Koskinen made his postseason debut in the NHL with the Oilers on 1 August 2020, playing in relief of Mike Smith in a 6–4 loss against the Chicago Blackhawks in Game 1 of the qualifying round. He earned his first and only NHL playoff win of his career in Game 2, making 23 saves in a 6–3 win against the Blackhawks.

After the end of the 2021–22 NHL season and the end of his contract with the Oilers, Koskinen signed a two-year contract with HC Lugano of the Swiss National League (NL) on 13 June 2022.

On 3 April 2024, Koskinen announced his retirement from professional hockey after two seasons with Lugano.

== International play ==
Medal record

Representing Finland

Ice hockey

World Championships
Silver medal – second place	2016 Russia	
Silver medal – second place	2014 Belarus	

Koskinen has represented Finland in the World Championships in 2014 and 2016. In 2016, he was included in the All-Star Team and was named the best goaltender.

== Career statistics ==
=== Regular season and playoffs ===
			Regular season									Playoffs
Season	Team	League	GP	W	L	T/OT	MIN	GA	SO	GAA	SV%	GP	W	L	MIN	GA	SO	GAA	SV%
2006–07	Kiekko-Vantaa	Jr. A	27	16	8	3	1567	62	3	2.37	.927	—	—	—	—	—	—	—	—
2007–08	Blues	Jr. A	20	12	4	4	1176	45	2	2.30	.907	2	0	2	81	7	0	5.18	—
2007–08	Blues	SM-l	1	1	0	0	60	0	1	0.00	1.000	—	—	—	—	—	—	—	—
2008–09	Blues	Jr. A	9	9	0	0	545	15	2	1.65	.930	—	—	—	—	—	—	—	—
2008–09	Blues	SM-l	33	17	9	7	1921	61	1	1.91	.932	14	6	8	856	37	0	2.59	.912
2009–10	Bridgeport Sound Tigers	AHL	2	1	1	0	123	5	0	2.45	.902	3	1	1	147	7	0	2.85	.900
2009–10	Utah Grizzlies	ECHL	6	6	0	0	360	15	0	2.50	.924	4	2	1	0	172	10	3.49	.899
2010–11	Bridgeport Sound Tigers	AHL	36	12	21	1	2063	120	0	3.49	.892	—	—	—	—	—	—	—	—
2010–11	New York Islanders	NHL	4	2	1	0	208	15	0	4.33	.873	—	—	—	—	—	—	—	—
2011–12	Bridgeport Sound Tigers	AHL	3	0	2	0	149	7	0	2.82	.909	—	—	—	—	—	—	—	—
2011–12	KalPa	SM-l	25	13	5	4	1382	53	5	2.30	.917	6	3	2	323	12	2	2.23	.890
2012–13	KalPa	SM-l	49	21	15	13	2953	101	7	2.05	.919	5	1	4	295	10	1	2.03	.936
2013–14	Blues	Liiga	2	1	0	1	121	5	0	2.47	.915	—	—	—	—	—	—	—	—
2013–14	Sibir Novosibirsk	KHL	41	20	11	8	2361	67	3	1.70	.939	10	4	5	607	20	1	1.98	.928
2014–15	Sibir Novosibirsk	KHL	29	16	11	1	1564	58	3	2.22	.921	—	—	—	—	—	—	—	—
2014–15	SKA Saint Petersburg	KHL	21	9	8	2	1270	40	1	1.89	.927	22	16	6	1377	37	3	1.61	.936
2015–16	SKA Saint Petersburg	KHL	41	20	18	0	2379	96	3	2.42	.915	15	8	7	981	24	5	1.47	.949
2016–17	SKA Saint Petersburg	KHL	23	14	6	3	1387	48	3	2.08	.916	15	12	1	913	25	1	1.64	.938
2017–18	SKA Saint Petersburg	KHL	29	22	4	1	1718	45	5	1.57	.937	15	10	5	924	25	4	1.62	.935
2018–19	Edmonton Oilers	NHL	55	25	21	6	2992	146	4	2.93	.906	—	—	—	—	—	—	—	—
2019–20	Edmonton Oilers	NHL	38	18	13	3	2117	97	1	2.75	.917	4	1	2	209	11	0	3.16	.889
2020–21	Edmonton Oilers	NHL	26	13	13	0	1438	76	0	3.17	.899	—	—	—	—	—	—	—	—
2021–22	Edmonton Oilers	NHL	45	27	12	4	2629	136	1	3.10	.903	3	0	2	90	6	0	4.04	.897
2022–23	HC Lugano	NL	33	13	17	0	1886	92	2	2.93	.900	8	4	4	531	18	2	2.03	.937
2023–24	HC Lugano	NL	28	12	13	0	1638	76	0	2.78	.900	4	1	3	237	13	0	3.29	.880
Liiga totals			108	52	29	25	6,316	215	14	2.04	.928	25	10	14	1,474	59	3	2.40	.914
KHL totals			184	101	58	15	10,680	354	18	1.99	.926	77	50	24	4,801	131	14	1.64	.938
NHL totals			168	85	60	13	9,383	470	6	3.01	.906	7	1	4	299	17	0	3.42	.892

=== International ===
Year	Team	Event	Result	GP	W	L	OT	MIN	GA	SO	GAA	SV%
2014	Finland	WC	2nd place, silver medalist(s)	1	0	1	0	58	4	0	4.12	.846
2016	Finland	WC	2nd place, silver medalist(s)	8	7	1	0	479	9	1	1.13	.947
2018	Finland	OG	6th	5	3	2	0	297	8	0	1.62	.931
Senior totals				14	10	4	0	834	21	1	1.52	.932

== Awards ==
=== International ===
Award	Year(s) awarded
Euro Hockey Tour winner	2017–18
World Championship All-Star Team	2016
World Championship Best Goaltender	2016

=== KHL ===
Award	Year(s) awarded
Gagarin Cup champion	2014–15, 2016–17
