= Ruki Tobita =

Japanese snowboarder (born 1999)

Personal information
- Nationality: Japanese
- Born: 7 May 1999 (age 26) Tokyo, Japan

Sport
- Country: Japan
- Sport: Snowboarding
- Event(s): Slopestyle, Big air

Ruki Tobita (飛田流輝, Tobita Ruki; born 7 May 1999) is a Japanese snowboarder who competes in the big air and slopestyle events. He represented Japan at the 2022 Winter Olympics.

== Career ==
During the 2019–20 FIS Snowboard World Cup, Tobita won the slopestyle Crystal Globe as the overall champion in the event. During the 2021 World Championships, he finished in fourth place in the big air event.

He represented Japan at the 2022 Winter Olympics in the men's slopestyle and big air events.
