= Dusty Henricksen =

American freestyle snowboarder (born 2003)

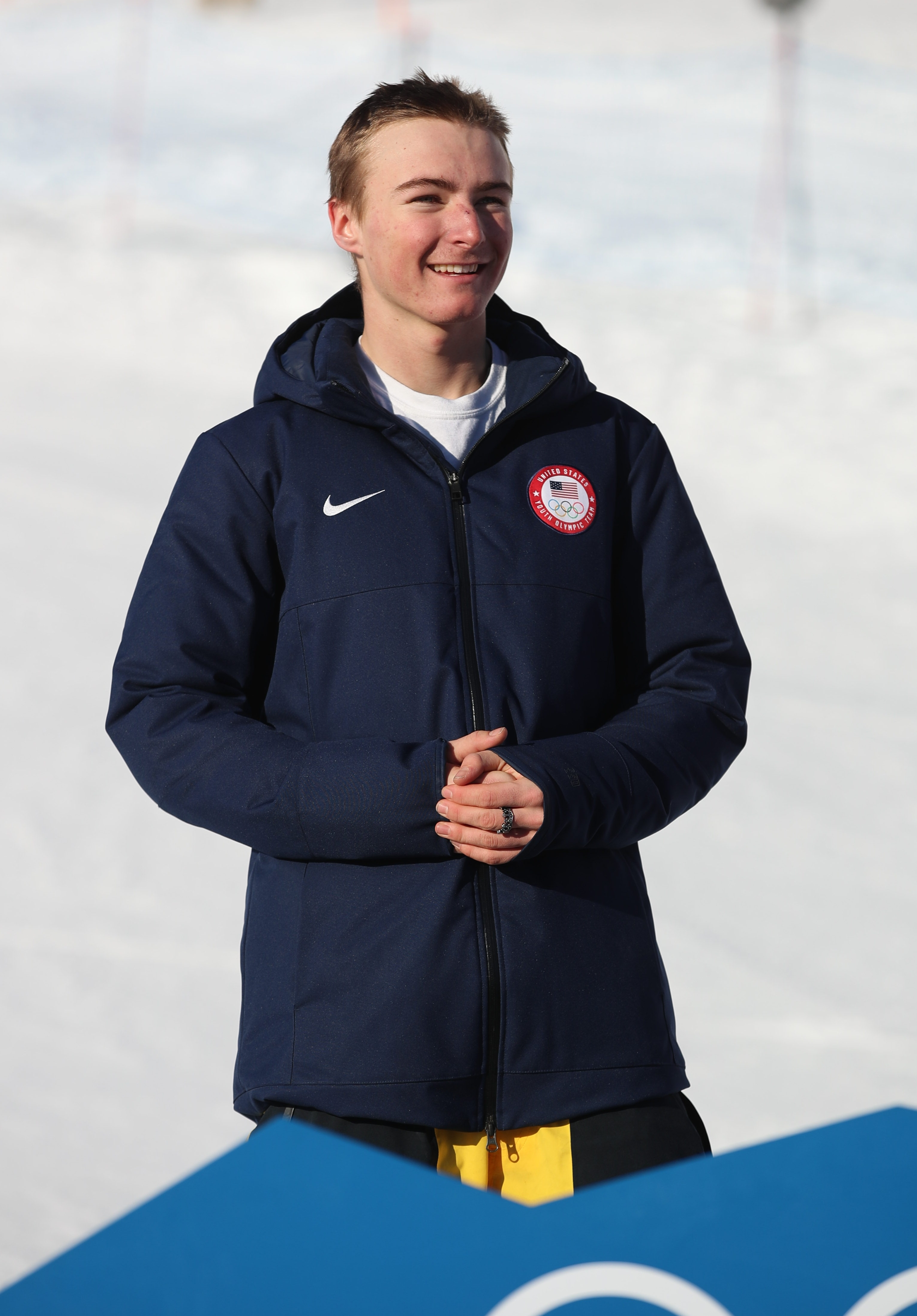
- Henricksen in 2020

Personal information
- Full name: Dustin Henricksen
- Born: February 2, 2003 (age 23) Big Bear Lake, California, U.S.
- Height: 6 ft (183 cm)

Sport
- Country: United States
- Sport: Snowboarding
- Event(s): Slopestyle, Knuckle Huck
Medal record
Men's snowboarding
Representing United States
Winter X Games
Gold medal – first place	2021 Aspen	Slopestyle
Gold medal – first place	2021 Aspen	Knuckle Huck
Bronze medal – third place	2022 Aspen	Knuckle Huck
Bronze medal – third place	2023 Aspen	Knuckle Huck
Youth Olympics
Gold medal – first place	2020 Lausanne	Slopestyle

Dustin Henricksen (born February 2, 2003) is an American freestyle snowboarder.

In the 2021 X Games, Henricksen won gold medals in Slopestyle and Knuckle Huck. Henricksen, who was 17 at the time, became the first U.S. male snowboarder to win the Winter X Games slopestyle snowboarding competition since Shaun White in 2009.

Henricksen made his debut in the Snowboard World Cup in Mammoth in March 2019, finishing 29th place in slopestyle. At the 2019 Junior World Championships in Kläppen, he finished 30th in Big Air and sixth in Slopestyle. After 23rd place in Modena and 17th place in Atlanta at the beginning of the 2019/20 season in Big Air, he achieved his first top ten place in the World Cup with ninth place in the Slopestyle in Laax and his first World Cup victory in the Slopestyle in Mammoth.

At the 2020 Winter Youth Olympic Games in Lausanne, Switzerland, Henricksen won the gold medal in slopestyle and also finished fourth in big air. At the end of February 2020, he finished second in slopestyle at the Burton US Open in Vail. He finished the 2020 season in 18th place in the Freestyle World Cup and third in the Slopestyle World Cup.

Henricksen was the first person to land a quadruple cork in a slopestyle competition at the 2020 Burton US Open, where he landed a backside quad cork 1800. Dusty currently resides in Mammoth Lakes, California.

He competed for the United States at the 2022 Winter Olympics in the men's slopestyle and men's big air events.
