= Rene Rinnekangas =

Finnish snowboarder (born 1999)

Personal information
- Nationality: Finnish
- Born: 25 September 1999 (age 27) Iisalmi, Finland
- Height: 1.69 m (5 ft 7 in)
- Weight: 59 kg (130 lb)

Sport
- Country: Finland
- Sport: Snowboarding
- Event: Slopestyle BigAir Knuckle Huck Real Snow
Medal record
Men's Snowboarding
Representing Finland
World Championships
Bronze medal – third place	2021 Aspen	Slopestyle
Winter X Games
Silver medal – second place	2019 Aspen	Slopestyle
Gold medal – first place	2020 Aspen	Real Snow
Bronze medal – third place	2021 Aspen	Slopestyle
Bronze medal – third place	2022 Aspen	Big air
Gold medal – first place	2026 Aspen	Knuckle Huck
Winter Youth Olympics
Bronze medal – third place	2016 Lillehammer	Slopestyle

Rene Rinnekangas (born 25 September 1999) is a Finnish snowboarder. He participated in the 2018 Winter Olympics in both slopestyle and BigAir, placing 28th and 22nd respectively. Rene competed in the 2019 Winter X Games in slopestyle earning a silver medal, and in BigAir, placing 5th. He competed in the 2020 Winter X Games placing 8th in the slopestyle competition, 4th in BigAir, and competed in the Wendy's Knuckle Huck ranking 5th. He also competed in the 2020 X-games Real Snow with trusted cameraman Anton Kiiski - the couple went on to win X-games gold in that category .

The 2021 Winter X Games were held with no audience due to the COVID-19 Pandemic. Rinnekangas placed 3rd in slopestyle earning a bronze medal and placed 8th in BigAir. During the 2022 Winter X Games, Rinnekangas finished 5th in slopestyle and secured a bronze medal for 3rd place in Mens BigAir.

In 2026, Rinnekangas secured his second X Games gold medal by winning the Men's Snowboard Knuckle Huck at X Games Aspen, notably defeating veteran Halldór Helgason with a technical performance highlighted by his signature "hand-drag" creative style.

Rinnekangas started snowboarding at age four alongside his older brother, Riko, in the small town of Iisalmi, Finland. "I just had to try it out because everything he did was the coolest thing ever.". He also plays bass guitar in his brother's punk bank, Kätfish.
