= Laura Toivanen =

Finnish biathlete

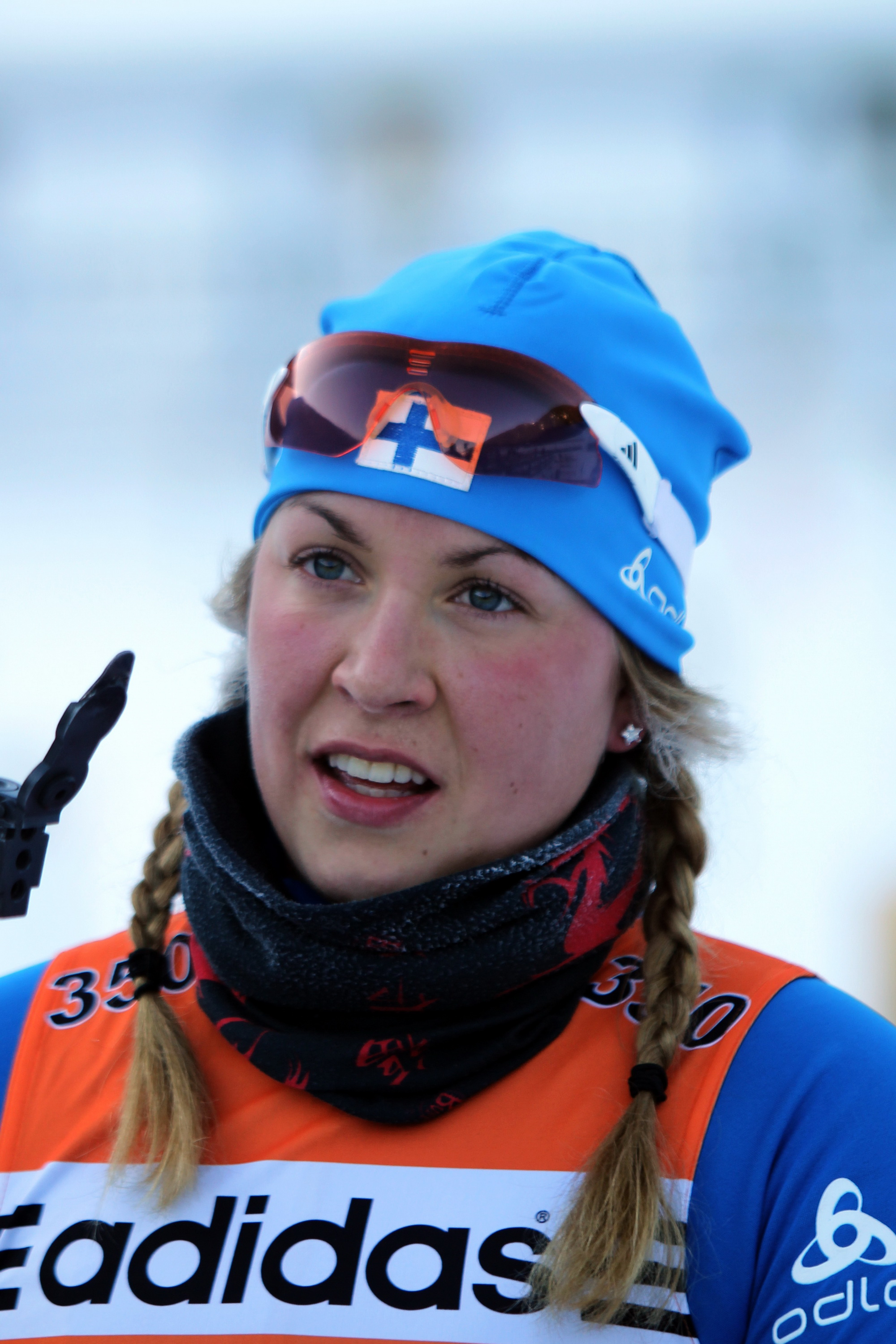
- Toivanen in 2010

Personal information
- Nationality: Finnish
- Born: 21 July 1988 (age 36)

Sport
- Country: Finland
- Sport: Biathlon

Laura Toivanen (born 21 July 1988) is a Finnish former biathlete. She competed in the Biathlon World Cup and represented Finland at several World Championships, including the 2018 Winter Olympics.

== Biathlon results ==
=== Olympic Games ===
0 medals

Event	Individual	Sprint	Pursuit	Mass start	Relay	Mixed relay^{[a]}
(South Korea) 2018 Pyeongchang	49th	77th	-	-	15th	6th

=== World Championships ===
6 medals (1 gold, 1 silver, 4 bronze)

Event	Individual	Sprint	Pursuit	Mass start	Relay	Mixed relay	Single mixed relay
(Russia) 2011 Khanty-Mansiysk	49th	-	-	-	10th	-	—
(Norway) 2016 Oslo	71st	-	-	-	17th	-	—
(Austria) 2017 Hochfilzen	-	90th	-	-	15th	-	—
(Sweden) 2019 Östersund	78th	63rd	-	-	22nd	-	-
