= Emiliano Lauzi =

Italian snowboarder (born 1994)

Personal information
- Nationality: Italian
- Born: 22 September 1994 (age 30); Melzo, Italy

Sport
- Country: Italy
- Sport: Snowboarding
- Event: Slopestyle/Big air
- Club: Snow Team Crammont

Emiliano Lauzi (born 22 September 1994) is an Italian snowboarder who competed in the men's slopestyle and big air events at the 2022 Winter Olympics. Lauzi had finished sixth in the big air event at the Aspen 2021 World Championships.
