= 2001–02 FIS Snowboard World Cup =

International snowboarding competition

Snowboard World Cup 2001/02
Discipline	Men	Women
Overall	(Canada) Jasey-Jay Anderson	(France) Karine Ruby
Giant slalom	(Slovenia) Dejan Košir	(Switzerland) Stefanie von Siebenthal
Parallel giant slalom	(Slovenia) Dejan Košir	(France) Isabelle Blanc
Parallel slalom	(France) Mathieu Bozzetto	(France) Karine Ruby
Parallel	(France) Mathieu Bozzetto	(Switzerland) Ursula Bruhin
Snowboard cross	(Canada) Jasey-Jay Anderson	(Austria) Doresia Krings
Halfpipe	(Germany) Jan Michaelis	(Austria) Nicola Pederzolli
Big air	(Finland) Jukka Erätuli	

Competition
Individual	42	38

The 2001/02 FIS Snowboard World Cup was 7th multirace tournament over a season for snowboarding organised by International Ski Federation. The season started on 17 November 2000 and ended on 17 March 2001. This season included six disciplines: parallel slalom, giant slalom, parallel giant slalom, snowboard cross, halfpipe, and big air (which debuted).

== Men ==
=== Giant slalom ===
No.	Season	Date	Place	Event	Winner	Second	Third
65	1	19 January 2002	(Italy) Bardonecchia	GS	(Sweden) Richard Richardsson	(Slovenia) Dejan Košir	(Austria) Lukas Grüner

=== Parallel giant slalom ===
No.	Season	Date	Place	Event	Winner	Second	Third
20	1	8 September 2001	(Chile) Valle Nevado	PGS	(Slovenia) Dejan Košir	(Germany) Markus Ebner	(Sweden) Stephen Copp
21	2	18 November 2001	(France) Tignes	PGS	(Austria) Stefan Kaltschütz	(Slovenia) Dejan Košir	(France) Mathieu Bozzetto
22	3	1 December 2001	(Austria) Ischgl	PGS	(France) Nicolas Huet	(Sweden) Stephen Copp	(Germany) Markus Ebner
23	4	2 December 2001	(Austria) Ischgl	PGS	(France) Mathieu Bozzetto	(Switzerland) Ueli Kestenholz	(Italy) Walter Feichter
24	5	10 December 2001	(Canada) Whistler	PGS	(Slovenia) Dejan Košir	(Canada) Jasey-Jay Anderson	(Austria) Siegfried Grabner
25	6	14 December 2001	(Canada) Mont Sainte-Anne	PGS	(Slovenia) Dejan Košir	(Switzerland) Gilles Jaquet	(France) Nicolas Huet
26	7	8 January 2002	(Switzerland) Arosa	PGS	(Austria) Alexander Maier	(Italy) Walter Feichter	(France) Mathieu Bozzetto
27	8	11 January 2002	(France) Alpe d'Huez	PGS	(Slovenia) Dejan Košir	(Austria) Siegfried Grabner	(Austria) Dieter Krassnig
28	9	20 January 2002	(Italy) Bardonecchia	PGS	(Austria) Siegfried Grabner	(Germany) Mathias Behounek	(Sweden) Stephen Copp
29	10	24 January 2002	(Austria) Kreischberg	PGS	(Austria) Siegfried Grabner	(Austria) Dieter Krassnig	(France) Nicolas Huet
30	11	1 March 2002	(Japan) Sapporo	PGS	(France) Mathieu Bozzetto	(Italy) Simone Salvati	(Slovenia) Dejan Košir
-	-	9 March 2002	(Germany) Bischofswiesen	PGS	Cancelled		
31	12	20 March 2002	(Sweden) Tandådalen	PGS	(Sweden) Daniel Biveson	(Germany) Markus Ebner	(Switzerland) Gilles Jaquet

=== Parallel slalom ===
No.	Season	Date	Place	Event	Winner	Second	Third
48	1	9 September 2001	(Chile) Valle Nevado	PSL	(France) Mathieu Bozzetto	(Germany) Markus Ebner	(Austria) Alexander Maier
49	2	30 November 2001	(Austria) Ischgl	PSL	(Sweden) Daniel Biveson	(France) Nicolas Huet	(Canada) Jasey-Jay Anderson
50	3	15 December 2001	(Canada) Mont Sainte-Anne	PSL	(France) Mathieu Bozzetto	(Germany) Mathias Behounek	(Slovenia) Dejan Košir
51	4	29 January 2002	(Austria) Bad Gastein	PSL	(Slovenia) Dejan Košir	(Germany) Mathias Behounek	(France) Nicolas Huet
-	-	1 February 2002	(Germany) München	PSL	Cancelled		
52	5	2 March 2002	(Japan) Sapporo	PSL	(Austria) Stefan Kaltschütz	(France) Mathieu Bozzetto	(Germany) Markus Ebner
-	-	10 March 2002	(Germany) Bischofswiesen	PSL	Cancelled		
53	6	14 March 2002	(Finland) Ruka	PSL	(France) Nicolas Huet	(Sweden) Daniel Biveson	(France) Mathieu Bozzetto
54	7	21 March 2002	(Sweden) Tandådalen	PSL	(France) Nicolas Huet	(Switzerland) Urs Eiselin	(Canada) Jasey-Jay Anderson

=== Snowboard cross ===
No.	Season	Date	Place	Event	Winner	Second	Third
33	1	6 September 2001	(Chile) Valle Nevado	SBX	(France) Xavier de Le Rue	(Canada) Jasey-Jay Anderson	(Canada) Drew Neilson
34	2	17 November 2001	(France) Tignes	SBX	(Australia) Zeke Steggall	(Switzerland) Guillaume Nantermod	(Canada) Drew Neilson
35	3	6 December 2001	(Canada) Whistler	SBX	(Italy) Simone Malusà	(Australia) Zeke Steggall	(France) Thomas Bourgault
36	4	18 January 2002	(Italy) Bardonecchia	SBX	(Canada) Jasey-Jay Anderson	(France) Aymerick Mermoz	(France) Guillaume Sachot
37	5	26 January 2002	(Austria) Kreischberg	SBX	(France) Thomas Bourgault	(France) Aymerick Mermoz	(Italy) Simone Malusà
38	6	30 January 2002	(Austria) Bad Gastein	SBX	(France) Thomas Bourgault	(Canada) Drew Neilson	(France) Aymerick Mermoz
39	7	15 March 2002	(Finland) Ruka	SBX	(Canada) Jasey-Jay Anderson	(Canada) Drew Neilson	(Austria) Alexander Koller
40	8	23 March 2002	(Sweden) Tandådalen	SBX	(Canada) Jasey-Jay Anderson	(Austria) Alexander Koller	(France) Guillaume Sachot

=== Halfpipe ===
No.	Season	Date	Place	Event	Winner	Second	Third
64	1	7 September 2001	(Chile) Valle Nevado	HP	(Spain) Íker Fernández	(Sweden) Markus Jonsson	(Switzerland) Jonas Emery
65	2	19 November 2001	(France) Tignes	HP	(Finland) Markku Koski	(Spain) Íker Fernández	(Finland) Risto Mattila
66	3	7 December 2001	(Canada) Whistler	HP	(United States) Tommy Czeschin	(Sweden) Magnus Sterner	(Canada) Guillaume Morisset
67	4	9 December 2001	(Canada) Whistler	HP	(Canada) Daniel Migneault	(Canada) Guillaume Morisset	(Canada) Michael Michalchuk
68	5	9 January 2002	(Switzerland) Arosa	HP	(Switzerland) Gian Simmen	(Finland) Heikki Sorsa	(Switzerland) Daniel Costandache
69	6	13 January 2002	(France) Alpe d'Huez	HP	(Finland) Heikki Sorsa	(Norway) Halvor Lunn	(Finland) Risto Mattila
70	7	25 January 2002	(Austria) Kreischberg	HP	(Germany) Jan Michaelis	(Finland) Antti Autti	(Finland) Miikka Hast
71	8	3 March 2002	(Japan) Sapporo	HP	(United States) Andy Finch	(Japan) Takaharu Nakai	(Germany) Jan Michaelis
-	-	8 March 2002	(Germany) Bischofswiesen	HP	Cancelled		
72	9	13 March 2002	(Finland) Ruka	HP	(Germany) Jan Michaelis	(Finland) Antti Autti	(Finland) Miikka Hast
73	10	22 March 2002	(Sweden) Tandådalen	HP	(Switzerland) Therry Brunner	(Germany) Jan Michaelis	(Finland) Risto Mattila

=== Big air ===
No.	Season	Date	Place	Event	Winner	Second	Third
1	1	30 November 2001	(Austria) Ischgl	BA	(Finland) Sami Tuoriniemi	(Germany) Jens Anselstätter	(Finland) Tuomo Ojala
2	2	11 December 2001	(Canada) Whistler	BA	(Finland) Jukka Erätuli	(Finland) Risto Mattila	(Finland) Antti Autti
3	3	27 January 2002	(Austria) Kreischberg	BA	(Slovenia) Tadej Valentan	(Finland) Jari Tuoriniemi	(Finland) Antti Autti
-	-	2 February 2002	(Germany) München	BA	Cancelled		
4	4	3 March 2002	(Japan) Sapporo	BA	(Finland) Jukka Erätuli	(Finland) Miikka Hast	(Japan) Kenji Ishikawa

== Men's standings ==
Overall
Rank	Name	Points
1	(Canada) Jasey-Jay Anderson	792
2	(France) Mathieu Bozzetto	719
3	(France) Nicolas Huet	622
4	(Slovenia) Dejan Košir	578
5	(Australia) Zeke Steggall	452

Giant slalom
Rank	Name	Points
1	(Slovenia) Dejan Košir	1000
2	(Germany) Markus Ebner	800
3	(Sweden) Stephen Copp	600
4	(Austria) Alexander Koller	500
5	(France) Mathieu Bozzetto	450

Giant slalom
Rank	Name	Points
1	(Slovenia) Dejan Košir	7510
2	(France) Mathieu Bozzetto	5552
3	(Austria) Siegfried Grabner	5420
4	(Germany) Markus Ebner	4190
5	(Sweden) Stephen Copp	4020

Parallel slalom
Rank	Name	Points
1	(France) Mathieu Bozzetto	4250
2	(France) Nicolas Huet	4000
3	(Slovenia) Dejan Košir	3260
4	(Sweden) Daniel Biveson	2870
5	(Germany) Markus Ebner	2850

Parallel
Rank	Name	Points
1	(France) Mathieu Bozzetto	2530
2	(Slovenia) Dejan Košir	1920
3	(Austria) Felix Stadler	1880
4	(Austria) Harald Walder	1510
5	(Austria) Alexander Maier	1490

Snowboardcross
Rank	Name	Points
1	(Canada) Jasey-Jay Anderson	4700
2	(Canada) Drew Neilson	4090
3	(France) Aymerick Mermoz	3510
4	(France) Thomas Bourgault	3490
5	(Australia) Zeke Steggall	3420

Halfpipe
Rank	Name	Points
1	(Germany) Jan Michaelis	5080
2	(Finland) Risto Mattila	3660
3	(Finland) Antti Autti	2436
4	(Finland) Heikki Sorsa	2200
5	(Germany) Daniel Tyrkas	2110

Big air
Rank	Name	Points
1	(Finland) Jukka Erätuli	2000
2	(Finland) Risto Mattila	1750
3	(Finland) Sami Tuoriniemi	1580
4	(Finland) Antti Autti	1200
5	(Finland) Miikka Hast	1120

== Women ==
=== Giant slalom ===
No.	Season	Date	Place	Event	Winner	Second	Third
65	1	19 January 2002	(Italy) Bardonecchia	GS	(France) Isabelle Blanc	(Austria) Manuela Riegler	(Austria) Heidi Krings

=== Parallel giant slalom ===
No.	Season	Date	Place	Event	Winner	Second	Third
20	1	8 September 2001	(Chile) Valle Nevado	PGS	(Switzerland) Stefanie von Siebenthal	(Germany) Heidi Renoth	(United States) Lisa Kosglow
21	2	18 November 2001	(France) Tignes	PGS	(Austria) Doris Günther	(France) Isabelle Blanc	(France) Karine Ruby
22	3	1 December 2001	(Austria) Ischgl	PGS	(Austria) Doris Günther	(Sweden) Sara Fischer	(Austria) Manuela Riegler
23	4	2 December 2001	(Austria) Ischgl	PGS	(France) Karine Ruby	(Switzerland) Stefanie von Siebenthal	(Austria) Heidi Neururer
24	5	10 December 2001	(Canada) Whistler	PGS	(France) Karine Ruby	(France) Julie Pomagalski	(Sweden) Åsa Windahl
25	6	14 December 2001	(Canada) Mont Sainte-Anne	PGS	(France) Julie Pomagalski	(Netherlands) Nicolien Sauerbreij	(France) Isabelle Blanc
26	7	8 January 2002	(Switzerland) Arosa	PGS	(Switzerland) Daniela Meuli	(Italy) Marion Posch	(France) Karine Ruby
27	8	11 January 2002	(France) Alpe d'Huez	PGS	(France) Isabelle Blanc	(France) Karine Ruby	(Sweden) Åsa Windahl
28	9	20 January 2002	(Italy) Bardonecchia	PGS	(France) Isabelle Blanc	(Italy) Lidia Trettel	(Austria) Doris Günther
29	10	24 January 2002	(Austria) Kreischberg	PGS	(Italy) Marion Posch	(France) Julie Pomagalski	(Sweden) Åsa Windahl
30	11	1 March 2002	(Japan) Sapporo	PGS	(Sweden) Sara Fischer	(Austria) Doris Günther	(Austria) Claudia Riegler
-	-	9 March 2002	(Germany) Bischofswiesen	PGS	Cancelled		
31	12	20 March 2002	(Sweden) Tandådalen	PGS	(Austria) Maria Kirchgasser-Pichler	(Switzerland) Ursula Bruhin	(Italy) Marion Posch

=== Parallel slalom ===
No.	Season	Date	Place	Event	Winner	Second	Third
48	1	9 September 2001	(Chile) Valle Nevado	PSL	(France) Karine Ruby	(Switzerland) Steffi von Siebenthal	(Germany) Heidi Renoth
49	2	30 November 2001	(Austria) Ischgl	PSL	(France) Karine Ruby	(Germany) Sandra Farmand	(Germany) Heidi Renoth
50	3	15 December 2001	(Canada) Mont Sainte-Anne	PSL	(France) Karine Ruby	(Germany) Heidi Renoth	(Austria) Heidi Krings
51	4	29 January 2002	(Austria) Bad Gastein	PSL	(France) Isabelle Blanc	(France) Karine Ruby	(Netherlands) Nicolien Sauerbreij
-	-	1 February 2002	(Germany) München	PSL	Cancelled		
52	5	2 March 2002	(Japan) Sapporo	PSL	(Switzerland) Ursula Bruhin	(Austria) Heidi Krings	(France) Isabelle Blanc
-	-	10 March 2002	(Germany) Bischofswiesen	PSL	Cancelled		
53	6	14 March 2002	(Finland) Ruka	PSL	(Austria) Claudia Riegler	(United States) Lisa Kosglow	(France) Karine Ruby
54	7	21 March 2002	(Sweden) Tandådalen	PSL	(Germany) Heidi Renoth	(France) Karine Ruby	(United States) Rosey Fletcher

=== Snowboard cross ===
No.	Season	Date	Place	Event	Winner	Second	Third
33	1	6 September 2001	(Chile) Valle Nevado	SBX	(France) Karine Ruby	(Russia) Mariya Tikhvinskaya	(Austria) Brigitte Holaus
34	2	17 November 2001	(France) Tignes	SBX	(France) Marie Laissus	(France) Marjorie Rey	(Switzerland) Tanja Frieden
35	3	6 December 2001	(Canada) Whistler	SBX	(Austria) Doresia Krings	(Sweden) Lina Christiansson	(United States) Marni Yamada
36	4	18 January 2002	(Italy) Bardonecchia	SBX	(Switzerland) Olivia Nobs	(Canada) Natasza Zurek	(Russia) Mariya Tikhvinskaya
37	5	26 January 2002	(Austria) Kreischberg	SBX	(France) Déborah Anthonioz	(Austria) Ursula Fingerlos	(Austria) Doresia Krings
38	6	30 January 2002	(Austria) Bad Gastein	SBX	(Austria) Ursula Fingerlos	(France) Déborah Anthonioz	(Switzerland) Olivia Nobs
39	7	15 March 2002	(Finland) Ruka	SBX	(France) Marie Laissus	(France) Julie Pomagalski	(Austria) Claudia Riegler
40	8	23 March 2002	(Sweden) Tandådalen	SBX	(Austria) Doresia Krings	(France) Julie Pomagalski	(France) Karine Ruby

=== Halfpipe ===
No.	Season	Date	Place	Event	Winner	Second	Third
64	1	7 September 2001	(Chile) Valle Nevado	HP	(Norway) Kjersti Buaas	(Germany) Nicola Thost	(Norway) Stine Brun Kjeldaas
65	2	19 November 2001	(France) Tignes	HP	(Austria) Nicola Pederzolli	(France) Doriane Vidal	(France) Cécile Alzina
66	3	7 December 2001	(Canada) Whistler	HP	(Austria) Nicola Pederzolli	(Canada) Natasza Zurek	(Germany) Sabine Wehr-Hasler
67	4	9 December 2001	(Canada) Whistler	HP	(Japan) Yoko Miyake	(Japan) Michiyo Hashimoto	(Canada) Dominique Vallee
68	5	9 January 2002	(Switzerland) Arosa	HP	(Switzerland) Fabienne Reuteler	(Germany) Sabine Wehr-Hasler	(Norway) Christel Thoresen
69	6	13 January 2002	(France) Alpe d'Huez	HP	(France) Cécile Alzina	(Canada) Maëlle Ricker	(France) Doriane Vidal
70	7	25 January 2002	(Austria) Kreischberg	HP	(Austria) Nicola Pederzolli	(Germany) Nicola Thost	(France) Valérie Bourdier
71	8	3 March 2002	(Japan) Sapporo	HP	(United States) Tricia Byrnes	(Austria) Nicola Pederzolli	(United States) Gretchen Bleiler
-	-	8 March 2002	(Germany) Bischofswiesen	HP	Cancelled		
72	9	13 March 2002	(Finland) Ruka	HP	(Austria) Nicola Pederzolli	(Finland) Heidi Kurkinen	(Germany) Sabine Wehr-Hasler
73	10	22 March 2002	(Sweden) Tandådalen	HP	(United States) Tricia Byrnes	(United States) Gretchen Bleiler	(Austria) Nicola Pederzolli

== Standings: Women ==
Overall
Rank	Name	Points
1	(France) Karine Ruby	999
2	(Austria) Doresia Krings	655
3	(Austria) Doris Günther	591
4	(France) Julie Pomagalski	563
5	(Austria) Ursula Fingerlos	555

Parallel
Rank	Name	Points
1	(Switzerland) Ursula Bruhin	3200
2	(Netherlands) Nicolien Sauerbreij	2700
3	(France) Isabelle Blanc	1900
4	(United States) Stacia Hookom	1580
5	(Germany) Heidi Renoth	1440

Parallel giant slalom
Rank	Name	Points
1	(France) Isabelle Blanc	6270
2	(Austria) Doris Günther	5770
3	(France) Karine Ruby	5690
4	(Italy) Marion Posch	4810
4	(France) Julie Pomagalski	4720

Parallel slalom
Rank	Name	Points
1	(France) Karine Ruby	5200
2	(Germany) Heidi Renoth	3620
3	(France) Isabelle Blanc	3080
4	(Austria) Claudia Riegler	3030
5	(Austria) Heidi Krings	1760
5	(Sweden) Åsa Windahl	1760

Giant slalom
Rank	Name	Points
1	(Switzerland) Steffi von Siebenthal	1000
2	(Germany) Heidi Renoth	800
3	(United States) Lisa Kosglow	600
4	(France) Julie Pomagalski	500
5	(United States) Rosey Fletcher	450

Snowboardcross
Rank	Name	Points
1	(Austria) Doresia Krings	4130
2	(France) Marie Laissus	4110
3	(Austria) Ursula Fingerlos	3820
4	(France) Déborah Anthonioz	3360
5	(Switzerland) Olivia Nobs	3050

Halfpipe
Rank	Name	Points
1	(Austria) Nicola Pederzolli	6620
2	(Germany) Sabine Wehr-Hasler	4570
3	(France) Valérie Bourdier	3380
4	(United Kingdom) Lesley McKenna	2700
5	(Canada) Maëlle Ricker	2670

== Podium table by nation ==
Rank	Nation	Gold	Silver	Bronze	Total
1	France	25	15	19	59
2	Austria	16	8	15	39
3	Switzerland	7	7	5	19
4	Slovenia	6	2	2	10
5	Finland	5	7	8	20
6	Canada	4	8	7	19
7	Sweden	4	6	5	15
8	United States	4	2	4	10
9	Germany	3	14	7	24
10	Italy	2	4	3	9
11	Japan	1	2	1	4
12	Norway	1	1	2	4
13	Australia	1	1	0	2
13	Spain	1	1	0	2
15	Netherlands	0	1	1	2
15	Russia	0	1	1	2
Totals (16 entries)		80	80	80	240

== See also ==
- Snowboarding at the 2002 Winter Olympics
