= Switzerland at the 2002 Winter Olympics =

- IOC code: SUI
- NOC: Swiss Olympic Association
- Website: www.swissolympic.ch (in German and French)

in Salt Lake City
- Competitors: 110 (80 men, 30 women) in 13 sports
- Flag bearers: Gian Simmen, Snowboarding
- Medals Ranked 11th: Gold 3 Silver 2 Bronze 6 Total 11

Winter Olympics appearances (overview)
- 1924; 1928; 1932; 1936; 1948; 1952; 1956; 1960; 1964; 1968; 1972; 1976; 1980; 1984; 1988; 1992; 1994; 1998; 2002; 2006; 2010; 2014; 2018; 2022; 2026

Switzerland competed at the 2002 Winter Olympics in Salt Lake City, United States.

== Medalists ==
Medal	Name	Sport	Event
Gold	Simon Ammann	Ski jumping	Men's normal hill (K90)
Gold	Simon Ammann	Ski jumping	Men's large hill (K120)
Gold	Philipp Schoch	Snowboarding	Men's parallel giant slalom
Silver	Christian Reich; Steve Anderhub	Bobsleigh	Two-man
Silver	Luzia Ebnöther; Mirjam Ott; Tanya Frei; Laurence Bidaud; Nadia Röthlisberger	Curling	Women's competition
Bronze	Sonja Nef	Alpine skiing	Women's giant slalom
Bronze	Martin Annen; Beat Hefti	Bobsleigh	Two-man
Bronze	Andrea Huber; Laurence Rochat; Brigitte Albrecht-Loretan; Natascia Leonardi Cortesi	Cross-country skiing	Women's 4 × 5 km relay
Bronze	Andreas Schwaller; Christof Schwaller; Markus Eggler; Damian Grichting; Marco Ramstein	Curling	Men's competition
Bronze	Gregor Stähli	Skeleton	Men's individual
Bronze	Fabienne Reuteler	Snowboarding	Women's halfpipe

== Alpine skiing ==
Men

Athlete	Event	Race 1	Race 2	Total	
Athlete	Event	Time	Time	Time	Rank
Didier Défago	Downhill			1:41.27	21
Franco Cavegn	Downhill			1:40.81	15
Didier Cuche	Downhill			1:40.76	14
Ambrosi Hoffmann	Downhill			1:40.31	8
Didier Cuche	Super-G			DSQ	–
Tobias Grünenfelder	Super-G			1:23.43	12
Paul Accola	Super-G			1:23.33	10
Didier Défago	Super-G			1:22.27	6
Tobias Grünenfelder	Giant Slalom	1:14.15	DNF	DNF	–
Didier Défago	Giant Slalom	1:13.74	1:11.80	2:25.54	14
Michael von Grünigen	Giant Slalom	1:13.27	1:11.80	2:25.07	11
Didier Cuche	Giant Slalom	1:13.25	1:11.75	2:25.00	10
Michael von Grünigen	Slalom	51.38	53.97	1:45.35	14
Urs Imboden	Slalom	49.61	52.87	1:42.48	5

Men's combined

Athlete	Downhill	Slalom		Total	
Athlete	Time	Time 1	Time 2	Total time	Rank
Bruno Kernen	1:40.07	DNF	–	DNF	–
Didier Défago	1:40.04	DNF	–	DNF	–
Paul Accola	1:39.62	48.73	53.91	3:22.26	6

Women

Athlete	Event	Race 1	Race 2	Total	
Athlete	Event	Time	Time	Time	Rank
Catherine Borghi	Downhill			1:41.88	19
Sylviane Berthod	Downhill			1:40.67	7
Corinne Rey-Bellet	Downhill			1:40.54	5
Sylviane Berthod	Super-G			DNF	–
Catherine Borghi	Super-G			1:15.62	18
Corinne Rey-Bellet	Super-G			1:14.73	9
Lilian Kummer	Giant Slalom	DNF	–	DNF	–
Fränzi Aufdenblatten	Giant Slalom	DNF	–	DNF	–
Corinne Rey-Bellet	Giant Slalom	1:17.92	1:15.51	2:33.43	13
Sonja Nef	Giant Slalom	1:16.94	1:14.73	2:31.67	3rd place, bronze medalist(s)
Corina Grünenfelder	Slalom	54.13	DNF	DNF	–
Marlies Oester	Slalom	53.64	DNF	DNF	–
Sonja Nef	Slalom	53.32	DNF	DNF	–

Women's combined

Athlete	Downhill	Slalom		Total	
Athlete	Time	Time 1	Time 2	Total time	Rank
Catherine Borghi	1:16.88	47.39	44.52	2:48.79	8
Marlies Oester	1:17.27	45.88	43.46	2:46.61	4

== Biathlon ==
Men

Event	Athlete	Misses ^{1}	Time	Rank
10 km sprint	Matthias Simmen	3	28:22.8	67
10 km sprint	Jean-Marc Chabloz	1	28:08.6	64
10 km sprint	Roland Zwahlen	1	27:43.7	55
12.5 km pursuit ^{2}	Roland Zwahlen	3	37:40.6	47

Event	Athlete	Time	Misses	Adjusted time ^{3}	Rank
20 km	Matthias Simmen	56:03.0	6	1'02:03.0	78
20 km	Jean-Marc Chabloz	55:59.4	3	58:59.4	61
20 km	Roland Zwahlen	54:10.6	4	58:10.6	58

Men's 4 × 7.5 km relay

Athletes	Race		
Athletes	Misses ^{1}	Time	Rank
Roland Zwahlen; Matthias Simmen; Jean-Marc Chabloz; Dani Niederberger	5	1'32:50.5	18

^{1} A penalty loop of 150 metres had to be skied per missed target.
^{2} Starting delay based on 10 km sprint results.
^{3} One minute added per missed target.

== Bobsleigh ==
Men

Sled	Athletes	Event	Run 1		Run 2		Run 3		Run 4		Total	
Sled	Athletes	Event	Time	Rank	Time	Rank	Time	Rank	Time	Rank	Time	Rank
SUI-1	Steve Anderhub; Christian Reich	Two-man	47.52	1	47.53	2	47.45	2	47.70	4	3:10.20	2nd place, silver medalist(s)
SUI-2	Martin Annen; Beat Hefti	Two-man	47.56	3	47.64	3	47.73	7	47.69	3	3:10.62	3rd place, bronze medalist(s)

Sled	Athletes	Event	Run 1		Run 2		Run 3		Run 4		Total	
Sled	Athletes	Event	Time	Rank	Time	Rank	Time	Rank	Time	Rank	Time	Rank
SUI-1	Martin Annen; Silvio Schäufelberger; Beat Hefti; Cédric Grand	Four-man	46.72	4	46.63	2	47.11	3	47.49	4	3:07.95	4
SUI-2	Christian Reich; Steve Anderhub; Guido Acklin; Urs Aeberhard	Four-man	46.71	2	46.93	8	47.33	6	47.62	8	3:08.59	6

Women

Sled	Athletes	Event	Run 1		Run 2		Total	
Sled	Athletes	Event	Time	Rank	Time	Rank	Time	Rank
SUI-1	Françoise Burdet; Katharina Sutter	Two-woman	49.28	4	49.06	3	1:38.34	4

== Cross-country skiing ==
Men

Sprint

Athlete	Qualifying round		Quarter finals		Semi finals		Finals	
Athlete	Time	Rank	Time	Rank	Time	Rank	Time	Final rank
Christoph Eigenmann	2:54.76	19	did not advance					

Pursuit

Athlete	10 km C		10 km F pursuit^{1}	
Athlete	Time	Rank	Time	Final rank
Patrick Mächler	28:12.7	45 Q	26:02.1	40
Reto Burgermeister	27:51.4	39 Q	26:11.7	41

Event	Athlete	Race	
Event	Athlete	Time	Rank
15 km C	Reto Burgermeister	38:49.2	9
30 km F	Patrick Rölli	1'16:36.5	39
30 km F	Wilhelm Aschwanden	1'16:32.4	38
30 km F	Gion-Andrea Bundi	1'16:19.6	34
30 km F	Patrick Mächler	1'15:03.4	28
50 km C	Patrick Rölli	2'24:34.4	45
50 km C	Reto Burgermeister	2'20:43.3	37
50 km C	Wilhelm Aschwanden	2'19:33.9	32

^{1} Starting delay based on 10 km C. results.
C = Classical style, F = Freestyle

4 × 10 km relay

Athletes	Race	
Athletes	Time	Rank
Wilhelm Aschwanden; Reto Burgermeister; Patrick Mächler; Gion-Andrea Bundi	1'37:26.4	10

Women

Sprint

Athlete	Qualifying round		Quarter finals		Semi finals		Finals	
Athlete	Time	Rank	Time	Rank	Time	Rank	Time	Final rank
Andrea Huber	3:22.18	27	did not advance					

Pursuit

Athlete	5 km C		5 km F pursuit^{2}	
Athlete	Time	Rank	Time	Final rank
Brigitte Albrecht-Loretan	14:30.0	48 Q	13:29.1	29
Laurence Rochat	13:57.1	23 Q	13:13.6	22

Event	Athlete	Race	
Event	Athlete	Time	Rank
10 km C	Laurence Rochat	DNF	–
10 km C	Natascia Leonardi Cortesi	29:57.5	15
15 km F	Brigitte Albrecht-Loretan	42:54.4	31
15 km F	Natascia Leonardi Cortesi	41:56.3	15
30 km C	Laurence Rochat	1'38:24.2	20
30 km C	Natascia Leonardi Cortesi	1'35:46.8	10

^{2} Starting delay based on 5 km C. results.
C = Classical style, F = Freestyle

4 × 5 km relay

Athletes	Race	
Athletes	Time	Rank
Andrea Huber; Laurence Rochat; Brigitte Albrecht-Loretan; Natascia Leonardi Cortesi	50:03.6	3rd place, bronze medalist(s)

== Curling ==
=== Men's tournament ===
==== Group stage ====
Top four teams advanced to semi-finals.

Country	Skip	W	L
Canada	Kevin Martin	8	1
Norway	Pål Trulsen	7	2
Switzerland	Andreas Schwaller	6	3
Sweden	Peja Lindholm	6	3
Finland	Markku Uusipaavalniemi	5	4
Germany	Sebastian Stock	4	5
Denmark	Ulrik Schmidt	3	6
(United Kingdom) Great Britain	Hammy McMillan	3	6
United States	Tim Somerville	3	6
France	Dominique Dupont-Roc	0	9

Team 1	Score	Team 2
Norway	4–5	Switzerland
Denmark	6–10	Switzerland
Switzerland	5–6	Finland
Sweden	7–8	Switzerland
Switzerland	2–6	United States
Canada	7–2	Switzerland
Switzerland	10–4	United Kingdom
France	3–7	Switzerland
Germany	4–10	Switzerland

==== Medal round ====
Semi-final

Sheet D	1	2	3	4	5	6	7	8	9	10	11	Final
Norway (Trulsen) 🔨	0	0	1	0	1	0	1	0	2	1	1	7
Switzerland (Schwaller)	0	1	0	3	0	1	0	1	0	0	0	6

Bronze medal game

Sheet C	1	2	3	4	5	6	7	8	9	10	Final
Sweden (Lindholm)	0	0	2	0	1	0	0	0	0	X	3
Switzerland (Schwaller) 🔨 (bronze)	1	2	0	1	0	0	2	1	0	X	7

Contestants

Switzerland
Biel-Touring CC, Biel

Skip: Andreas Schwaller
Third: Christof Schwaller
Second: Markus Eggler
Lead: Damian Grichting
Alternate: Marco Ramstein

=== Women's tournament ===
==== Group stage ====
Top four teams advanced to semi-finals.

Country	Skip	W	L
Canada	Kelley Law	8	1
Switzerland	Luzia Ebnöther	7	2
United States	Kari Erickson	6	3
(United Kingdom) Great Britain	Rhona Martin	5	4
Germany	Natalie Neßler	5	4
Sweden	Elisabet Gustafson	5	4
Norway	Dordi Nordby	4	5
Japan	Akiko Katoh	2	7
Denmark	Lene Bidstrup	2	7
Russia	Olga Jarkova	1	8

Team 1	Score	Team 2
Switzerland	9–8	Denmark
Switzerland	7–6	Russia
Norway	5–7	Switzerland
Japan	7–8	Switzerland
United States	6–7	Switzerland
United Kingdom	7–4	Switzerland
Switzerland	7–8	Sweden
Switzerland	7–6	Canada
Germany	4–10	Switzerland

==== Medal round ====
Semi-final

Sheet B	1	2	3	4	5	6	7	8	9	10	Final
Switzerland (Ebnöther)	0	2	1	0	0	1	2	0	3	X	9
United States (Erickson) 🔨	1	0	0	1	1	0	0	1	0	X	4

Gold medal game

Sheet C	1	2	3	4	5	6	7	8	9	10	Final
Switzerland (Ebnöther) (silver)	0	0	0	1	0	0	0	1	1	0	3
Great Britain (Martin) 🔨	0	0	0	0	2	0	1	0	0	1	4

Contestants

Switzerland
CC Bern AAM, Bern

Skip: Luzia Ebnöther
Third: Mirjam Ott
Second: Tanya Frei
Lead: Laurence Bidaud
Alternate: Nadia Röthlisberger

== Figure skating ==
Men

Athlete	Points	SP	FS	Rank
Stéphane Lambiel	24.0	16	16	15

Women

Athlete	Points	SP	FS	Rank
Sarah Meier	20.5	9	16	13

Ice Dancing

Athletes	Points	CD1	CD2	OD	FD	Rank
Eliane Hugentobler; Daniel Hugentobler	28.4	15	15	14	14	14

== Freestyle skiing ==
Men

Athlete	Event	Qualification			Final		
Athlete	Event	Time	Points	Rank	Time	Points	Rank
Christian Stohr	Moguls	28.51	24.03	19	did not advance		
Martin Walti	Aerials		160.56	21	did not advance		
Christian Kaufmann	Aerials		214.90	13	did not advance		

Women

Athlete	Event	Qualification			Final		
Athlete	Event	Time	Points	Rank	Time	Points	Rank
Corinne Bodmer	Moguls	36.05	20.28	26	did not advance		
Manuela Müller	Aerials		125.47	20	did not advance		
Evelyne Leu	Aerials		203.16	1 Q		147.31	11

== Ice hockey ==
=== Men's tournament ===
==== Preliminary round - group B ====
Top team (shaded) advanced to the first round.

Team	GP	W	L	T	GF	GA	GD	Pts
Belarus	3	2	1	0	5	3	+2	4
Ukraine	3	2	1	0	9	5	+4	4
Switzerland	3	1	1	1	7	9	−2	3
France	3	0	2	1	6	10	−4	1

All times are local (UTC-7).

9 February 2002; 21:00	Switzerland	3 – 3 (1–1, 0–1, 2–1)	France	E Center, West Valley City; Attendance: 8,504

11 February 2002; 16:00	Ukraine	5 – 2 (2–1, 2–1, 1–0)	Switzerland	E Center, West Valley City; Attendance: 8,387

12 February 2002; 16:00	Switzerland	2 – 1 (1–0, 1–1, 0–0)	Belarus	E Center, West Valley City; Attendance: 7,736

==== Consolation round ====
11th place match

14 February 2002; 15:00	Switzerland 11th	4 – 1 (0–0, 2–0, 2–1)	Austria	E Center, West Valley City; Attendance: 7,986

Contestants; David Aebischer; Jean-Jacques Aeschlimann; Björn Christen; Flavien Conne; Gian-Marco Crameri; Patric Della Rossa; Patrick Fischer; Martin Gerber; Martin Höhener; Sandy Jeannin; Marcel Jenni; Olivier Keller; Martin Plüss; André Rötheli; Ivo Rüthemann; Edgar Salis; Mathias Seger; Martin Steinegger; Mark Streit; Patrick Sutter; Julien Vauclair; Reto von Arx

== Luge ==
Men

Athlete	Run 1		Run 2		Run 3		Run 4		Total	
Athlete	Time	Rank	Time	Rank	Time	Rank	Time	Rank	Time	Rank
Reto Gilly	46.220	33	45.053	16	45.079	24	44.959	9	3:01.311	24
Stefan Höhener	45.101	17	45.254	23	44.534	7	44.911	7	2:59.800	13

== Nordic combined ==
Men's sprint

Events:

- large hill ski jumping
- 7.5 km cross-country skiing (Start delay, based on ski jumping results.)

Athlete	Ski Jumping		Cross-country time	Total rank
Athlete	Points	Rank	Cross-country time	Total rank
Andreas Hurschler	91.2	38	18:21.9	21
Ronny Heer	103.9	19	18:34.0	29
Andy Hartmann	104.2	18	17:44.7	8
Seppi Hurschler	105.8	15	18:36.0	31

Men's individual

Events:

- normal hill ski jumping
- 15 km cross-country skiing (Start delay, based on ski jumping results.)

Athlete	Ski Jumping		Cross-country time	Total rank
Athlete	Points	Rank	Cross-country time	Total rank
Ivan Rieder	186.5	43	49:12.0	42
Andreas Hurschler	198.0	39	44:19.4	25
Ronny Heer	222.0	21	44:40.0	29
Andy Hartmann	236.5	9	41:42.3	9

Men's team

Four participants per team.

Events:

- normal hill ski jumping
- 5 km cross-country skiing (Start delay, based on ski jumping results.)

Athletes	Ski jumping		Cross-country time	Total rank
Athletes	Points	Rank	Cross-country time	Total rank
Andreas Hurschler; Jan Schmid; Ivan Rieder; Ronny Heer	863.0	7	52:07.9	7

== Skeleton ==
Men

Athlete	Run 1		Run 2		Total	
Athlete	Time	Rank	Time	Rank	Time	Rank
Felix Poletti	51.76	11	52.11	18	1:43.87	16
Gregor Stähli	51.16	4	50.99	1	1:42.15	3rd place, bronze medalist(s)

Women

Athlete	Run 1		Run 2		Total	
Athlete	Time	Rank	Time	Rank	Time	Rank
Maya Pedersen	52.92	7	52.63	1	1:45.55	5

== Ski jumping ==
Athlete	Event	Qualifying jump			Final jump 1			Final jump 2		Total	
Athlete	Event	Distance	Points	Rank	Distance	Points	Rank	Distance	Points	Points	Rank
Sylvain Freiholz	Normal hill	89.0	112.0	15 Q	89.0	113.0	27 Q	91.0	115.0	228.0	25
Andreas Küttel	Normal hill	90.5	114.0	13 Q	90.0	114.0	24 Q	91.0	117.5	231.5	22
Simon Ammann	Normal hill	Pre-qualified			98.0	133.5	1 Q	98.5	135.5	269.0	1st place, gold medalist(s)
Marco Steinauer	Large hill	104.5	82.1	35 Q	106.5	87.2	45	did not advance			
Sylvain Freiholz	Large hill	109.5	93.6	27 Q	118.0	110.4	26 Q	110.5	95.4	205.8	27
Andreas Küttel	Large hill	117.0	109.6	8 Q	125.0	125.0	8 Q	122.0	120.6	245.6	6
Simon Ammann	Large hill	Pre-qualified			132.5	140.5	1 Q	133.0	140.9	281.4	1st place, gold medalist(s)

Men's team large hill

Athletes	Result	
Athletes	Points ^{1}	Rank
Marco Steinauer; Sylvain Freiholz; Andreas Küttel; Simon Ammann	818.3	7

^{1} Four teams members performed two jumps each.

== Snowboarding ==
Men's parallel giant slalom

Athlete	Qualifying		Round one	Quarter final	Semi final	Final	Rank
Athlete	Time	Rank	Round one	Quarter final	Semi final	Final	Rank
Ueli Kestenholz	DNF	–	did not advance				
Simon Schoch	38.63	25	did not advance				
Philipp Schoch	37.34	15 Q	(Austria) Alexander Maier W	(France) Mathieu Bozzetto W	(United States) Chris Klug W	(Sweden) Richard Richardsson W	1st place, gold medalist(s)
Gilles Jaquet	35.69	1 Q	(France) Nicolas Huet L (DSQ)	did not advance			

Men's halfpipe

Athlete	Qualifying round 1		Qualifying round 2		Final	
Athlete	Points	Rank	Points	Rank	Points	Rank
Marcel Hitz	23.8	23	35.9	9	did not advance	
Gian Simmen	34.8	12	33.5	12	did not advance	
Therry Brunner	36.0	9	37.7	7	did not advance	

Women's parallel giant slalom

Athlete	Qualifying		Round one	Quarter final	Semi final	Final	Rank
Athlete	Time	Rank	Round one	Quarter final	Semi final	Final	Rank
Milena Meisser	DNF	–	did not advance				
Daniela Mueli	43.46	20	did not advance				
Nadia Livers	43.27	19	did not advance				
Steffi von Siebenthal	42.68	13 Q	(France) Isabelle Blanc L	did not advance			

Women's halfpipe

Athlete	Qualifying round 1		Qualifying round 2		Final	
Athlete	Points	Rank	Points	Rank	Points	Rank
Fabienne Reuteler	32.0	7	40.4	1 QF	39.7	3rd place, bronze medalist(s)
