= Snowboarding at the 2002 Winter Olympics – Men's halfpipe =

Men's halfpipe at the XIX Olympic Winter Games
- Pictogram for snowboarding
- Venue: Park City
- Date: 11 February 2002
- Competitors: 34 from 12 nations
- Winning score: 46.1

Medalists
1st place, gold medalist(s)		Ross Powers	United States
2nd place, silver medalist(s)		Daniel Kass	United States
3rd place, bronze medalist(s)		Jarret Thomas	United States

The men's halfpipe event in snowboarding at the 2002 Winter Olympics was held in Park City, United States. The competition took place on 11 February 2002.

The American sweep of the medal podium was the first for that country since the 1956 Winter Olympics, when they won all three medals in the men's singles in figure skating.

== Medalists ==
Gold	Ross Powers; United States
Silver	Danny Kass; United States
Bronze	Jarret Thomas; United States

== Results ==
The halfpipe event for men took place on 11 February 2002, both the qualification rounds and the finals taking place on that day. Fortythirty snowboarders took part in the qualification, the top twelve of whom move on to the finals.

In the qualification round, each snowboarder was given two runs to be in the top six of that run. Regardless of how many points the person received, as long as they placed in the top six, they advanced to the finals. If the person qualified in the first run, they did not need to do a second run in the qualification. The finals proceeded in a similar fashion. The twelve qualifiers had two runs in which to score the highest possible points. The snowboarders were ranked by their highest score, and medals were awarded accordingly. The following is a table detailing the results of the qualification and finals runs of the competing snowboarders.

Rank	Name	Country	Qual. 1	Qual. 2	Qual. Rank	Final 1	Final 2	Final Best
1st place, gold medalist(s)	Ross Powers	United States	33.9	42.1	9	46.1	~~32.0~~	46.1
2nd place, silver medalist(s)	Danny Kass	United States	36.7	42.7	8	42.5	~~41.5~~	42.5
3rd place, bronze medalist(s)	Jarret Thomas	United States	19.7	43.5	7	~~33.2~~	42.1	42.1
4	Giacomo Kratter	Italy	39.8	-	4	~~34.9~~	42.0	42.0
5	Takaharu Nakai	Japan	38.3	-	6	~~38.3~~	40.7	40.7
6	Tommy Czeschin	United States	41.8	-	2	40.6	~~40.5~~	40.6
7	Heikki Sorsa	Finland	44.2	-	1	~~36.8~~	40.4	40.4
8	Markku Koski	Finland	36.9	41.3	10	39.0	~~25.4~~	39.0
9	Trevor Andrew	Canada	10.8	39.4	11	~~30.3~~	38.6	38.6
10	Daniel Franck	Norway	39.9	-	3	~~29.2~~	37.4	37.4
11	Magnus Sterner	Sweden	32.0	39.1	12	36.6	~~17.9~~	36.6
12	Jan Michaelis	Germany	39.7	-	5	~~DNS~~	0.2	0.2
13	Therry Brunner	Switzerland	36.0	37.7	13	-		
14	Kim Christiansen	Norway	23.3	37.0	14	-		
15	Marcel Hirtz	Switzerland	23.8	35.9	15	-		
16	Risto Mattila	Finland	35.7	34.3	16	-		
17	Marek Sasiadek	Poland	18.8	34.0	17	-		
18	Gian Simmen	Switzerland	34.8	33.5	18	-		
19	Daisuke Murakami	Japan	19.4	32.7	19	-		
20	Xaver Hoffmann	Germany	32.3	32.6	20	-		
21	Sebastien Vassoney	France	13.5	32.1	21	-		
22	Brett Carpentier	Canada	29.7	31.6	22	-		
23	Iker Fernandez	Spain	31.0	31.1	23	-		
24	Stefan Karlsson	Sweden	29.8	30.4	24	-		
25	Tomas Johansson	Sweden	32.1	30.1	25	-		
26	Daniel Migneault	Canada	19.2	28.7	26	-		
27	Mike Michalchuk	Canada	34.8	28.6	27	-		
28	Jonathan Collomb-Patton	France	23.9	28.5	28	-		
29	Kentaro Miyawaki	Japan	13.6	27.0	29	-		
30	Tuomo Ojala	Finland	28.2	23.3	30	-		
31	Halvor Skramstad Lunn	Norway	30.0	21.7	31	-		
32	Daniel Tyrkas	Germany	22.5	21.4	32	-		
33	Mathieu Justafre	France	16.0	12.2	33	-		
-	Espen Arvesen	Norway	DNS	DNS	-	-		
