= Snowboarding at the 2006 Winter Olympics – Men's halfpipe =

Men's halfpipe at the XX Olympic Winter Games
- Pictogram for snowboarding
- Venue: Bardonecchia
- Date: 12 February 2006
- Competitors: 44 from 17 nations

Medalists
| 1st place, gold medalist(s) | | Shaun White | United States |
| 2nd place, silver medalist(s) | | Daniel Kass | United States |
| 3rd place, bronze medalist(s) | | Markku Koski | Finland |

Men's halfpipe

The men's halfpipe event in snowboarding at the 2006 Winter Olympics was held in Bardonecchia, a village in the Province of Turin, Italy. The competition took place on 12 February 2006.

== Medalists ==
| Gold | Shaun White; United States |
| Silver | Danny Kass; United States |
| Bronze | Markku Koski; Finland |

== Results ==
The halfpipe event for men took place on 12 February 2006, both the qualification rounds and the finals taking place on that day. Forty-four snowboarders took part in the qualification, the top twelve of whom moved on to the finals.

In the qualification round, each snowboarder was given two runs to be in the top six of that run. Regardless of how many points the person received, as long as they placed in the top six, they advanced to the finals. If the person qualified in the first run, they did not need to do a second run in the qualification. Shaun White, the gold medalist for this event, came in seventh place after the first run, requiring him to compete again in the second run, where he recorded the highest score of the event to that point. The finals proceeded in a similar fashion. The twelve qualifiers had two runs in which to score the highest possible points. The snowboarders were ranked by their highest score, and medals were awarded accordingly. The following is a table detailing the results of the qualification and finals runs of the competing snowboarders.

| Rank | Name | Qualification | | | Final | |
| Rank | Name | Run 1 | Run 2 | Rank | Run 1 | Run 2 |
|---|---|---|---|---|---|---|
| Gold medal | Shaun White (USA) | 37.7 | 45.3 | 7 | 46.8 | ~~26.6~~ |
| Silver medal | Danny Kass (USA) | 43.8 | — | 1 | ~~20.8~~ | 44.0 |
| Bronze medal | Markku Koski (FIN) | 20.2 | 40.6 | 9 | 41.5 | ~~31.4~~ |
| 4 | Mason Aguirre (USA) | 43.4 | — | 3 | 40.3 | ~~37.1~~ |
| 5 | Antti Autti (FIN) | 43.5 | — | 2 | ~~28.2~~ | 39.1 |
| 6 | Gary Zebrowski (FRA) | 30.7 | 43.3 | 8 | 38.6 | ~~29.5~~ |
| 7 | Markus Keller (SUI) | 33.7 | 38.3 | 11 | ~~29.3~~ | 38.5 |
| 8 | Christophe Schmidt (GER) | 39.4 | — | 6 | ~~33.2~~ | 37.5 |
| 9 | Vinzenz Lüps (GER) | 33.9 | 39.5 | 10 | ~~28.7~~ | 36.8 |
| 10 | Risto Mattila (FIN) | 40.8 | — | 5 | ~~31.6~~ | 35.8 |
| 11 | Crispin Lipscomb (CAN) | 19.6 | 37.9 | 12 | ~~23.4~~ | 33.5 |
| 12 | Andy Finch (USA) | 43.1 | — | 4 | ~~9.6~~ | 24.7 |
| 13 | Giacomo Kratter (ITA) | 12.8 | 37.0 | 13 | | |
| 14 | Takaharu Nakai (JPN) | 36.8 | 36.0 | 14 | | |
| 15 | Jan Michaelis (GER) | 34.5 | 36.3 | 15 | | |
| 16 | Brad Martin (CAN) | 27.2 | 34.7 | 16 | | |
| 17 | Mathieu Crépel (FRA) | 37.4 | 34.4 | 17 | | |
| 18 | Hugo Lemay (CAN) | 26.0 | 34.1 | 18 | | |
| 19 | Gian Simmen (SUI) | 32.0 | 33.8 | 19 | | |
| 20 | Janne Korpi (FIN) | 9.2 | 33.5 | 20 | | |
| 21 | Justin Lamoureux (CAN) | 10.1 | 31.5 | 21 | | |
| 22 | Fumiyuki Murakami (JPN) | 27.9 | 31.1 | 22 | | |
| 23 | Kazuhiro Kokubo (JPN) | 26.9 | 31.0 | 23 | | |
| 24 | Frederik Kalbermatten (SUI) | 16.8 | 30.8 | 24 | | |
| 25 | Mitchell Brown (NZL) | 16.3 | 28.3 | 25 | | |
| 26 | Dan Wakeham (GBR) | 14.3 | 27.8 | 26 | | |
| 27 | Micael Lundmark (SWE) | 32.5 | 27.2 | 27 | | |
| 28 | Iker Fernandez (ESP) | 27.0 | 27.0 | 28 | | |
| 29 | Michał Ligocki (POL) | 11.3 | 26.9 | 29 | | |
| 30 | Halvor Lunn (NOR) | 24.2 | 26.4 | 30 | | |
| 31 | Mitchell Allan (AUS) | 28.8 | 23.7 | 31 | | |
| 32 | Andrew Burton (AUS) | 15.2 | 21.8 | 32 | | |
| 33 | Martin Cernik (CZE) | 18.8 | 20.1 | 33 | | |
| 34 | Xaver Hoffman (GER) | 22.6 | 18.7 | 34 | | |
| 35 | Domu Narita (JPN) | 31.5 | 14.7 | 35 | | |
| 36 | Mikael Sandy (SWE) | 19.7 | 14.0 | 36 | | |
| 37 | Iouri Podladtchikov (RUS) | 1.0 | 13.6 | 37 | | |
| 38 | Frederik Austbø (NOR) | 29.2 | 13.0 | 38 | | |
| 39 | Therry Brunner (SUI) | 23.0 | 9.2 | 39 | | |
| 40 | Stefan Karlsson (SWE) | 11.5 | 8.7 | 40 | | |
| 41 | Kim Christiansen (NOR) | 31.0 | 5.1 | 41 | | |
| 42 | Ben Mates (AUS) | 4.9 | 5.0 | 42 | | |
| 43 | Manuel Pietropoli (ITA) | 12.3 | 4.1 | 43 | | |
| 44 | Mateusz Ligocki (POL) | 11.6 | 4.0 | 44 | | |
