= Spain at the 2002 Winter Olympics =

- IOC code: ESP
- NOC: Spanish Olympic Committee
- Website: www.coe.es (in Spanish)

in Salt Lake City, Utah
- Competitors: 7 (4 men, 3 women) in 3 sports
- Flag bearer: Íker Fernández (snowboarding)
- Medals: Gold 0 Silver 0 Bronze 0 Total 0

Winter Olympics appearances (overview)
- 1936; 1948; 1952; 1956; 1960; 1964; 1968; 1972; 1976; 1980; 1984; 1988; 1992; 1994; 1998; 2002; 2006; 2010; 2014; 2018; 2022; 2026

Spain was represented at the 2002 Winter Olympics in Salt Lake City, Utah, United States by the Spanish Olympic Committee.

In total, seven athletes including four men and three women represented Spain across three different sports including alpine skiing, cross-country skiing and snowboarding.

During the games, Spain's Johann Mühlegg won three gold medals. He was later stripped of all three medals following a failed doping test.

== Competitors ==
In total, seven athletes represented Spain at the 2002 Winter Olympics in Salt Lake City, Utah, United States across three different sports.

Sport	Men	Women	Total
Alpine skiing	0	3	3
Cross-country skiing	3	0	0
Snowboarding	1	0	1
Total	4	3	7

== Medalists ==
Although Johann Mühlegg won three gold medals in cross-country skiing, he was later stripped of all three medals. He was forced to give up his men's 50 km classical gold during the games after testing positive for the banned substance darbepoetin. In December 2003, the Court of Arbitration for Sport stripped Mühlegg of his golds in the 30 km freestyle and the 2 x 10 km pursuit.

A pink background donates a medal which was later stripped from the competitor.

Spanish medalist at the 2002 Winter Olympics
Athlete	Country	Medal	Event
Johann Mühlegg	Spain	1st place, gold medalist(s)	Cross-Country Skiing, men's 50 km classical
Johann Mühlegg	Spain	1st place, gold medalist(s)	Cross-Country Skiing, men's 30 km freestyle
Johann Mühlegg	Spain	1st place, gold medalist(s)	Cross-Country Skiing, men's 2 x 10 km pursuit

== Alpine skiing ==
Three Spanish athletes participated in the alpine skiing events – Ana Galindo Santolaria, María José Rienda and Carolina Ruiz Castillo.

Women

Athlete	Event	Race 1	Race 2	Total	
Athlete	Event	Time	Time	Time	Rank
Carolina Ruiz Castillo	Super-G			1:15.17	15
Carolina Ruiz Castillo	Giant Slalom	DNF	–	DNF	–
Ana Galindo Santolaria	Giant Slalom	1:18.84	1:17.39	2:36.23	24
María José Rienda	Giant Slalom	1:16.73	1:15.80	2:32.53	6
Carolina Ruiz Castillo	Slalom	57.72	58.50	1:56.22	26
María José Rienda	Slalom	56.18	55.93	1:52.11	15

== Cross-country skiing ==
Three Spanish athletes participated in the cross-country skiing events – Juan Jesús Gutiérrez, Johann Mühlegg and Haritz Zunzunequi. All three competed in the men's 50 km classical, 30 km freestyle and 2 x 10 km pursuit.

Men

Pursuit

Athlete	10 km C		10 km F pursuit^{1}	
Athlete	Time	Rank	Time	Final rank
Johann Mühlegg	DSQ	–	DSQ	–
Haritz Zunzunequi	29:01.3	56 Q	27:41.0	54
Juan Jesús Gutiérrez	28:06.7	43 Q	25:47.5	37

Event	Athlete	Race	
Event	Athlete	Time	Rank
30 km F	Johann Mühlegg	DSQ	–
30 km F	Haritz Zunzunequi	1'17:06.5	41
30 km F	Juan Jesús Gutiérrez	1'14:05.1	17
50 km C	Johann Mühlegg	DSQ	–
50 km C	Haritz Zunzunequi	DNF	–
50 km C	Juan Jesús Gutiérrez	2'15:14.4	20

^{1} Starting delay based on 10 km C. results.
C = Classical style, F = Freestyle

== Snowboarding ==
One Spanish athlete participated in the snowboarding events – Íker Fernández in the men's halfpipe.

Men's halfpipe

Athlete	Qualifying round 1		Qualifying round 2		Final	
Athlete	Points	Rank	Points	Rank	Points	Rank
Íker Fernández	31.0	17	31.1	17	did not advance	

== Links ==
- Official Olympic Reports
- Olympic Winter Games 2002, full results by sports-reference.com
