= Park City Mountain Resort =

Ski resort in Park City, Utah

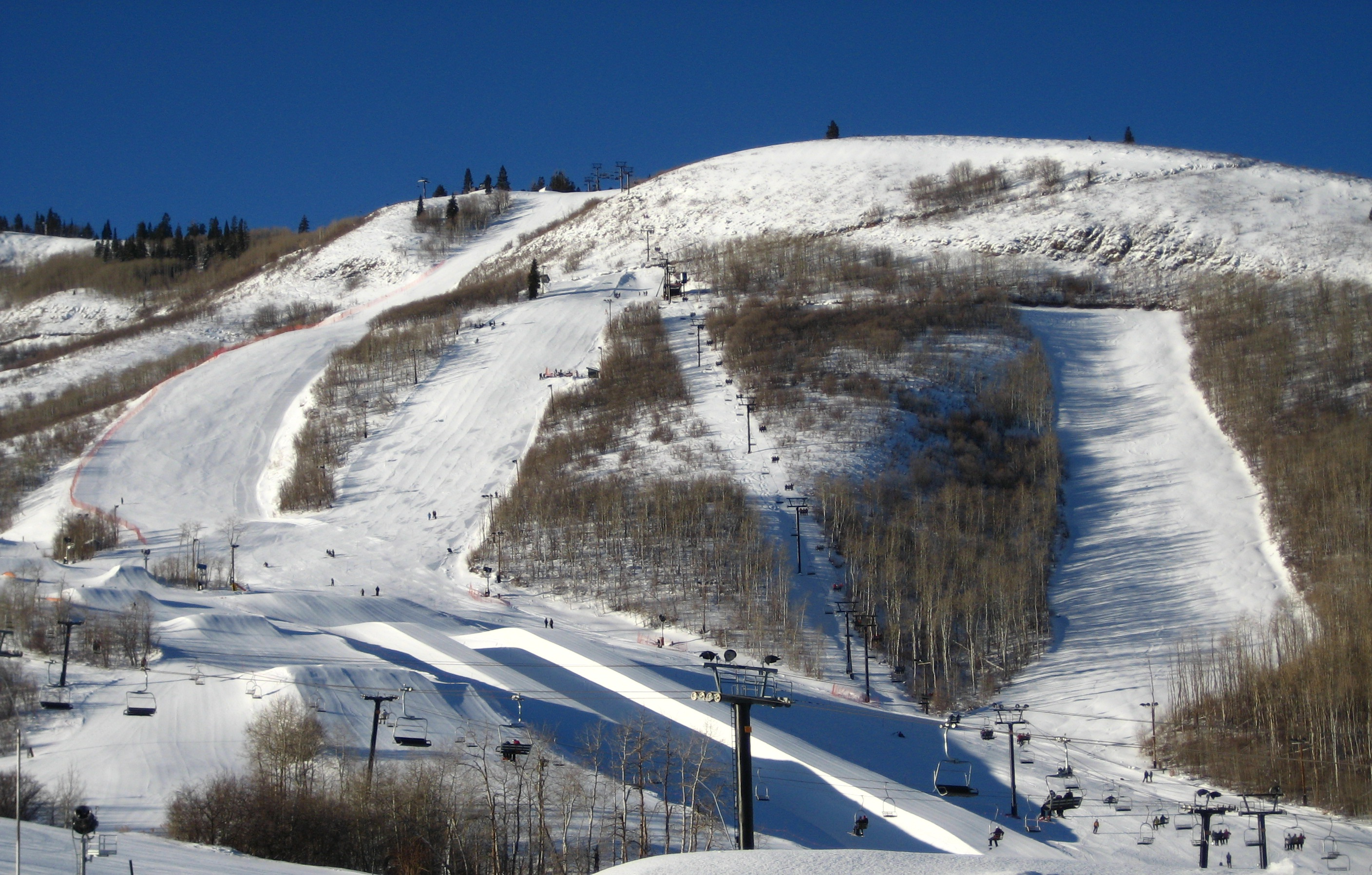
- The Resort's Eagle Race Arena in January 2007

- Location in Utah Location in the United States
- Location: Park City, Utah, United States
- Coordinates: 40°39′3″N 111°30′27″W
- Status: Operating
- Owner: Vail Resorts
- Vertical: 3,200 ft (980 m)
- Top elevation: 10,026 ft (3,056 m)
- Base elevation: 6,900 ft (2,100 m)
- Skiable area: 6,700 acres (10.5 sq mi; 27.1 km^{2})
- Trails: 324; 7% easiest 49% more difficult 44% most difficult
- Longest run: Homerun, 3.5 mi (5.6 km)
- Lift system: 41; Gondolas: 4 Chairs: 32: 6 high speed six packs; 9 high speed quads; 5 quads; 8 triples; 4 doubles Surface: 2; 3 magic carpet
- Lift capacity: 31,000 skiers/hr
- Terrain parks: 7; 1 superpipe 1 minipipe 6 natural half pipes
- Snowfall: 355 inches (29.6 ft; 9.0 m)
- Snowmaking: 500 acres (2.0 km^{2})
- Night skiing: No
- Website: parkcitymountain.com

Park City Mountain Resort (PCMR) is a ski resort in the western United States in Park City, Utah, located 32 miles (51 km) east of Salt Lake City. Park City, as the ski resort and area is known, contains several training courses for the U.S. Ski Team, including slalom and giant slalom runs. During the 2002 Winter Olympics, it hosted the snowboarding and alpine giant slalom events.

Opened 63 years ago in 1963, the resort has been a major tourist attraction for skiers from all over the United States, as well as a main employer for many of Park City's citizens. The resort was purchased by Vail Resorts in 2014 and combined the resort with neighboring Canyons Resort via an interconnect gondola to create the largest lift-served ski resort in the United States.

== History ==
The resort was opened on December 21, 1963, as Treasure Mountain by United Park City Mines, the last surviving mining corporation in Park City, and the resort was opened with funds from a federal government program to revive the economically depressed town. When it originally opened, it boasted the longest gondola in the United States, as well as, a double chairlift, a J-bar lift, base and summit lodges, and a nine-hole golf course. The gondola was a four-passenger Polig-Heckel-Bleichert (PHB, a German aerial ropeway company). Its sister lift was built at Sugarloaf in Carrabassett Valley, Maine, after top members of Sugarloaf's management visited Park City's lift.

When the slopes first opened to the public, a special Skier's Subway was used to transport skiers nearly 2.5 miles (4.0 km) into the mountain through the pitch-black Spiro Tunnel on a mine train, where skiers then boarded a mining elevator ("hoist") that lifted them 1,750 feet (530 m) to the surface at the foot of the Thaynes Canyon chair, and from there they had access to the entire mountain. Aerial trams once used for hauling ore were converted into chairlifts. To this day, more than one thousand miles (1,600 km) of old silver-mine workings and tunnels remain beneath the slopes of Park City and neighboring Deer Valley.

Treasure Mountain's name was changed to the Park City Ski Area for its fourth season of 1966–67; in 1996, it was renamed Park City Mountain Resort. The resort had grown to include eight peaks and nine bowls, with 3,300 acres (5.2 sq mi; 13.4 km^{2}) of skiing and sixteen chairlifts. The resort has also developed summer activities including an alpine slide, alpine coaster, zip-lines, and several hiking and biking trails.

A sister ski area, originally known as Park City West and later as Canyons Resort, opened in 1968. Deer Valley Resort opened in December 1981, at the site of the former Snow Park (1946–69).

=== 2002 Winter Olympics ===
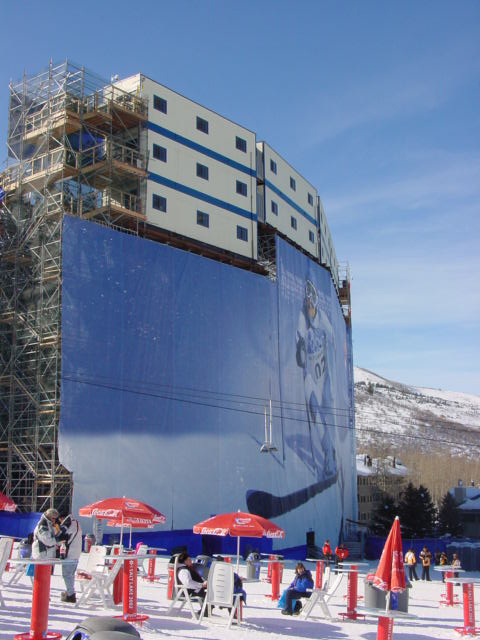
Temporary seating at the resort during the 2002 Olympics

During the 2002 games, the resort hosted the men's and women's giant slalom, men's and women's snowboarding parallel giant slalom, and both men's and women's snowboarding halfpipe events. The resort's Eagle Race Arena and Eagle Superpipe were used as the Olympics runs. Temporary stadiums were erected at the end of each run with spectator standing areas on each side, creating a combined capacity of 16,500 persons. Almost all available tickets for events at the resort were sold — 99.8 percent — to a total of 95,991 spectators. During the games, 96 percent of the resort was open for normal seasonal operations, making it the only venue to allow spectators to leave and reenter.

=== 2012 litigation ===
In March 2012, Powdr Corporation (POWDR), owners of Park City Mountain Resort (PCMR), announced that it had filed a lawsuit against Talisker Land Holdings, LLC (Talisker), which owned the adjacent Canyons Resort, as well as United Park City Mines Company, both partial land owners of the resort. The lawsuit filed by POWDR was in response to an eviction notice issued by Talisker, the entity that owns most of the land the PCMR ski runs are on, who had been leasing it to POWDR (a continuation of the existing lease between Park City Mines and POWDR when Talisker bought the land from Park City Mines). POWDR claimed that they had initiated talks with Talisker to extend their lease to 2051, and that Talisker had refused to agree to the terms and threatened to close the resort. In response, Talisker claimed that POWDR had failed to agree to the new terms set down by Talisker, and that they had never threatened to close the resort. POWDR sued Talisker for $7 million (equivalent to $9.8 million in 2025) for compensatory and punitive damages for the threat of the closure of the resort.

PCMR had leased the land on which its ski runs are located for $155,000 per year, with an option to renew the lease for 20 years. In March 2011, when this option came due, POWDR failed to renew the lease in a timely manner and sent a letter two days after the lease had expired. Eight months later, POWDR received a letter from Talisker that their lease had expired and they were to turn over the leased land and its improvements to Talisker. In 2013, Talisker leased its 4,000 acre Canyons Resort to Vail Resorts (Vail), for $25 million per year plus a percentage of the Canyons Resort revenue, plus a condition that Vail also take over the legal action. Near the end of May 2013, an eviction notice was served on POWDR to vacate the leased land of PCMR, including all infrastructure on said land, which would leave POWDR with just the private land and infrastructure (accommodations, shops, parking, etc.) at the base of the ski runs. (Greater City Co. v. United Park City Mines, 120500157 (Summit County Utah May 21, 2014).)

On September 11, 2014, Vail announced that it had purchased the base of PCMR, including its name and recognition of ski runs improvements, from POWDR for $182.5 million (equivalent to $248.2 million in 2025) and that it would combine the resort with neighboring Canyons Resort over the summer of 2015 for the 2015–16 season.

=== Park City Mountain Resort under Vail Resorts ===
When the purchase was finalized, Vail added Park City Mountain Resort to its EPIC season pass program for the 2014–15 season. In 2015, the merger of PCMR with Canyons was undertaken by Doppelmayr USA as part of a project that built two new lifts and relocated a third. A new gondola called Quicksilver was built between the bottom of Silverlode at PCMR and a point below the top of Iron Mountain at Canyons. King Con was upgraded to a high speed six pack, while the original King Con high speed quad was relocated to replace the Motherlode triple chairlift. The upgrades on the PCMR side were done to alleviate expected congestion at Silverlode and King Con from the added interconnect gondola. The former Canyons Resort base area was renamed the Canyons Village at Park City and the entire combined resort now operates under the Park City Mountain Resort name.

Park City mountain resort is home to many ski schools run by the mountain, but is also home to privately owned ski schools. In 2017, the various individual clubs came together to form one organization - Park City Ski & Snowboard Club.

For the 2018 season, Doppelmayr constructed a high speed quad to replace the High Meadow lift at Red Pine Lodge.

For the 2019 season, Skytrac built a new fixed grip quad chairlift called "Over and Out" that goes from the bottom of Tombstone to a point just above the top of Sunrise, providing quick egress from the Tombstone and Iron Mountain pods to the Canyons Village base area by alleviating the need to take Tombstone back to Red Pine Lodge. The lift takes about five minutes and thirty seconds to ride.

For the 2022 season, Doppelmayr had been contracted to construct two new detachable chairlifts on the Park City side of the resort. However, after the Park City Planning Commission revoked the permit to replace these lifts in Park City, Vail Resorts announced that these lifts will now be installed at Whistler Blackcomb in 2023 and replace the Jersey Cream and Fitzsimmons lifts there.

==== 2024-2025 ski patrol strike ====
Starting in December 2024, 200 ski patrollers at the resort went on strike seeking a raise in wages. In response, Vail Resorts brought in replacement patrollers from other resorts. Park City's mayor has supported the striking ski patrollers, calling on Vail Resorts to take action and "conclude negotiations and end the uncertainty."

== Statistics ==
As of the 2015–16 season, after the merger with Canyons Resort.

=== Mountain information ===
- Base elevation: 6,900 feet (2,103 m)
- Summit elevation: 10,026 feet (3,056 m)
- Vertical rise: 3,100 feet (945 m)
- Total mountain peaks: 8
- Total skiable area: 6,700 acres (27.1 km^{2})
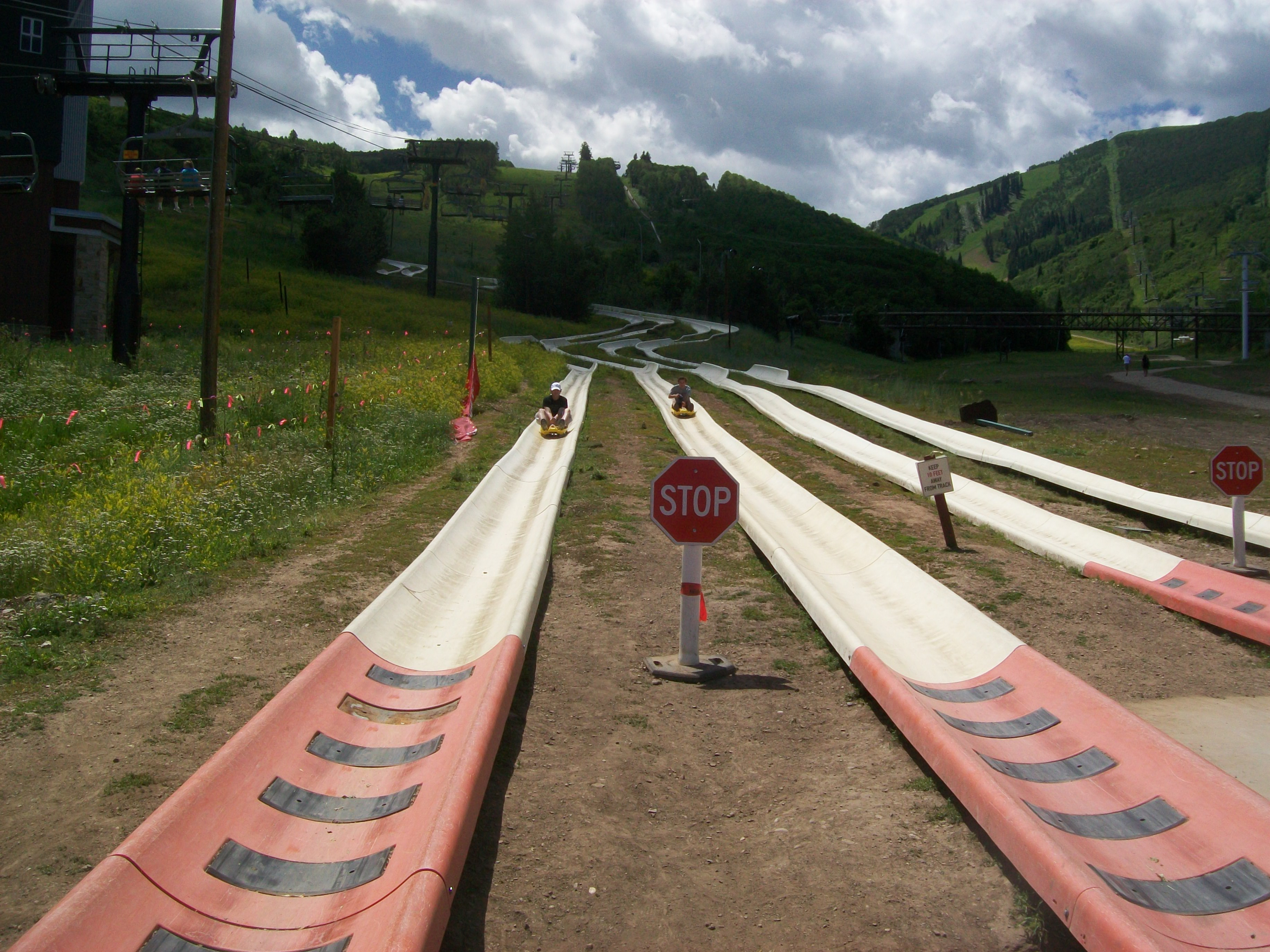
  Alpine Slide at Mountain side Resort in Park City, Utah
- Average Annual Snowfall: 365 inches (930 cm)

=== Trails ===
- Total Trails: 348
  - Beginner: 15%
  - Intermediate: 54%
  - Expert: 31%
- Terrain Parks: 4
- Superpipe: 1
- Minipipe: 1

=== Lifts ===
Lift name	Length	Vertical	Type	Make	Year installed
3 Kings	2,176 ft	439 ft	Fixed Triple	Doppelmayr	2011
Bonanza Express	5,318 ft	1,122 ft	High Speed Six	Garaventa CTEC	1997
Cabriolet	2,705 ft	193 ft	Cabriolet	Garaventa CTEC	2000
Crescent Express	7,200 ft	1,743 ft	High Speed Quad	Doppelmayr CTEC	2008
Day Break			Fixed Triple	Yan	2001
Dreamcatcher	4,619 ft	1,533 ft	Fixed Quad	Doppelmayr CTEC	2006
Dreamscape			Fixed Quad	Garaventa CTEC	2000
Eagle	2,515 ft	1,155 ft	Fixed Triple	Garaventa CTEC	1993
Eaglet	1,355 ft	255 ft	Fixed Triple	Garaventa CTEC	1995
First Time Express	1,823 ft	276 ft	High Speed Quad	Doppelmayr CTEC	2004
Flat Iron	1,641 ft	4 ft	Fixed Double	Thiokol	2009
Frostwood Gondola	1,963 ft	166 ft	Pulse Gondola	Doppelmayr CTEC	2008
High Meadow Express	1,965 ft	278 ft	High Speed Quad	Doppelmayr	2018
Iron Mountain Express	5,181 ft	1,484 ft	High Speed Quad	Doppelmayr CTEC	2010
Jupiter	3,315 ft	1,000 ft	Fixed Double	Yan	1976
King Con Express	4,438 ft	1,216 ft	High Speed Six	Doppelmayr	2015
McConkey's Express	5,260 ft	1,172 ft	High Speed Six	Garaventa CTEC	1998
Motherlode Express			High Speed Quad	Garaventa CTEC	2015
Ninety Nine 90 Express	6,680 ft	1,563 ft	High Speed Quad	Garaventa CTEC	1998
Orange Bubble Express	8,709 ft	1,523 ft	High Speed Quad	Doppelmayr CTEC	2010
Over and Out	2,412 ft	278 ft	Fixed Quad	Skytrac	2019
PayDay Express	5,726 ft	1,278 ft	High Speed Six	Garaventa CTEC	1997
Peak 5	2,815 ft	1,038 ft	Fixed Quad	Garaventa CTEC	1999
Pioneer	3,720 ft	968 ft	Fixed Triple	CTEC	1984
Quicksilver Gondola	7,767 ft	1,686 ft	Gondola	Doppelmayr	2015
Red Pine Gondola	6,679 ft	1,119 ft	Gondola	Poma	1997
Saddleback Express	4,269 ft	1,121 ft	High Speed Quad	Garaventa CTEC	1997
Short Cut			Fixed Triple	Yan	1997
Silverlode Express	5,370 ft	1,322 ft	High Speed Six	Garaventa CTEC	1996
Silver Star			Fixed Triple	Garaventa CTEC	2006
Sun Peak Express	3,729 ft	1,087 ft	High Speed Quad	Doppelmayr	1997
Sunrise Gondola	6232 ft	1105 ft	Ten-Person Gondola	Leitner-Poma	2025
Super Condor Express	6,910 ft	1,798 ft	High Speed Quad	Garaventa CTEC	1998
Thaynes	2,800 ft	850 ft	Fixed Double	Yan	1975
Timberline	2,229 ft	360 ft	Fixed Quad	Doppelmayr CTEC	2008
Tombstone Express	6,566 ft	1,734 ft	High Speed Six	Doppelmayr CTEC	2006
Town	6,665 ft	1,232 ft	Fixed Triple	CTEC	1985

=== Slope aspects ===
- North: 43%
- East: 29%
- West: 24%
- South: 4%

== Summer ==
During the summer, Payday provides lift service to an alpine slide and an alpine coaster. Restaurants are also open during the summer, and will often have live bands and other activities. The resort creates and maintains its own trails and trail connections to the rest of the Park City area trail system. Activities at the resort include miniature golf, a climbing wall, and trampolines with a harness.

The resort offers lift-served access for hiking and mountain biking on Crescent, Payday, and Town lifts from the Park City Mountain Village base. Canyons Village provides hiking and biking access via the Red Pine Gondola and Short Cut. Most trails in the area are family-friendly and not very strenuous. The majority of mountain bike trails are intermediate, with a small percentage designated as expert trails.

== In popular culture ==
Park City is one of the featured mountains in the 2008 video game Shaun White Snowboarding.
