= Luke Trembath =

Australian snowboarder (1986–2025)

Luke Trembath (January 9, 1986 – February 28, 2025), known as "the Dingo," was an Australian professional snowboarder, media personality, and entrepreneur.

== Early life ==
Born in Mount Martha, Victoria, Australia, Trembath rose to prominence in the action sports world for his snowboarding achievements. He began snowboarding at age nine and became a nationally recognized talent in Australia by 13. At 14, he moved to the United States with his mother to train with the U.S. snowboarding team, initially living in Steamboat Springs, Colorado, before settling in Mammoth Lakes, California. He turned professional at 17 and co-founded Grenade Gloves, a snowboard accessory brand, with fellow snowboarder Danny Kass.

== Career ==
Trembath gained wider recognition through the Fuel TV series The Adventures of Danny and The Dingo (2008–2013). He later co-hosted the UNLEASHED podcast for Monster Energy alongside Kass and Brittney Palmer, continuing his influence in action sports media. In 2018, he co-founded Find Your Grind, an educational platform aimed at preparing students for modern careers.

== Death ==
Trembath died in February 2025 at the age of 39, prompting tributes from figures like T. J. Lavin, Tony Hawk, Avril Lavigne, Kurt Busch and MGK. His cause of death was not publicly disclosed, however, it was later revealed on a Jason Ellis Patreon show that Trembath had "taken something to fall asleep and never woke back up."
