= Snowboarding at the 2002 Winter Olympics – Women's parallel giant slalom =

Women's parallel giant slalom at the XIX Olympic Winter Games
- Venue: Park City
- Date: 14–15 February 2002
- Competitors: 30 from 12 nations

Medalists
1st place, gold medalist(s)		Isabelle Blanc	France
2nd place, silver medalist(s)		Karine Ruby	France
3rd place, bronze medalist(s)		Lidia Trettel	Italy

The women's parallel giant slalom event in snowboarding at the 2002 Winter Olympics was held in Park City, United States. The competition began on 14 February 2002, with the final rounds on 15 February 2002.

== Medalists ==
Gold	Isabelle Blanc; France
Silver	Karine Ruby; France
Bronze	Lidia Trettel; Italy

== Qualification ==
The top 16 racers, based on their qualification time, advanced to the elimination rounds.

Rank	Bib	Name	Nationality	1st run (time)	Rank	2nd run (time)	Rank	Total time
1	17	Maria Kirchgasser	Austria	19.21	3	22.23	3	41.44
2	4	Karine Ruby	France	18.97	1	22.48	7	41.45
3	9	Lidia Trettel	Italy	19.14	2	22.80	11	41.94
4	6	Isabelle Blanc	France	19.77	11	22.43	6	42.20
5	10	Julie Pomagalski	France	19.95	17	22.30	4	42.25
6	27	Isabella Dal Balcon	Italy	19.77	11	22.49	8	42.26
7	15	Lisa Kosglow	United States	19.46	5	22.84	12	42.30
8	20	Dagmar Mair Unter der Eggen	Italy	19.45	4	22.87	13	42.32
9	22	Jagna Marczulajtis	Poland	20.03	19	22.36	5	42.39
10	3	Aasa Windahl	Sweden	19.91	15	22.60	9	42.51
11	24	Katharina Himmler	Germany	19.55	6	22.99	15	42.54
12	1	Marion Posch	Italy	19.58	7	23.01	16	42.59
13	16	Steffi von Siebenthal	Switzerland	19.74	10	22.94	14	42.68
14	23	Jana Sedova	Slovakia	19.70	9	23.22	20	42.92
15	26	Mariya Tikhvinskaya	Russia	19.88	14	23.09	18	42.97
16	28	Ran Iida	Japan	19.83	13	23.23	21	43.06
17	19	Sondra Van Ert	United States	20.52	23	22.63	10	43.15
18	14	Sara Fischer	Sweden	19.96	18	23.25	22	43.21
19	30	Nadia Livers	Switzerland	20.21	20	23.06	17	43.27
20	12	Daniela Meuli	Switzerland	20.34	22	23.12	19	43.46
21	11	Heidi Maria Renoth	Germany	19.64	8	23.90	26	43.54
22	29	Tomoka Takeuchi	Japan	20.25	21	23.51	24	43.76
23	5	Manuela Riegler	Austria	19.91	15	24.13	27	44.04
24	8	Nicolien Sauerbreij	Netherlands	21.02	25	23.69	25	44.71
25	21	Florine Valdenaire	France	21.47	26	23.49	23	44.96
26	13	Rosey Fletcher	United States	23.09	27	22.02	2	45.11
27	25	Lisa Odynski	United States	20.95	24	24.52	28	45.47
28	18	Claudia Riegler	Austria	29.92	28	21.95	1	51.87
-	2	Doris Günther	Austria	DNF	-	-	-	-
-	7	Milena Meisser	Switzerland	DNF	-	-	-	-

DNF - Did not finish

== Elimination round ==
In the elimination round, each head-to-head contest consists of two runs. If one competitor wins both runs, that competitor advances. If the runs are split, the racer with the overall fastest time advances.

1/8 finals
1	Kirchgasser (AUT)
16	Iida (JPN)	DSQ
8	Mair Unter der Eggen (ITA)	+0.61
9	Marczulajtis (POL)
5	Pomagalski (FRA)
12	Posch (ITA)	+1.13
4	Blanc (FRA)
13	von Siebenthal (SUI)	+1.94
3	Trettel (ITA)
14	Sedova (SVK)	+2.11
6	Dal Balcon (ITA)
11	Himmler (GER)	+0.23
7	Kosglow (USA)
10	Windahl (SWE)	+1.32
2	Ruby (FRA)
15	Tikhvinskaya (RUS)	+28.9

Quarterfinals
1	Kirchgasser (AUT)	DSQ
9	Marczulajtis (POL)
5	Pomagalski (FRA)	+2.07
4	Blanc (FRA)
3	Trettel (ITA)
6	Dal Balcon (ITA)	+3.59
7	Kosglow (USA)	+2.70
2	Ruby (FRA)

Semifinals
9	Marczulajtis (POL)	DSQ
4	Blanc (FRA)
3	Trettel (ITA)	+0.15
2	Ruby (FRA)

Finals
4	Blanc (FRA)
2	Ruby (FRA)	+1.74
Third place
9	Marczulajtis (POL)	DSQ
3	Trettel (ITA)
