= The Canyons =

The Canyons may refer to:

- The Canyons (film), a 2013 thriller directed by Paul Schrader
- Canyons Resort, formerly The Canyons, an alpine ski resort in Park City, Utah
