= Quicksilver Gondola =

Gondola in Park City, Utah

Coordinates: 40.6411°N 111.528°W

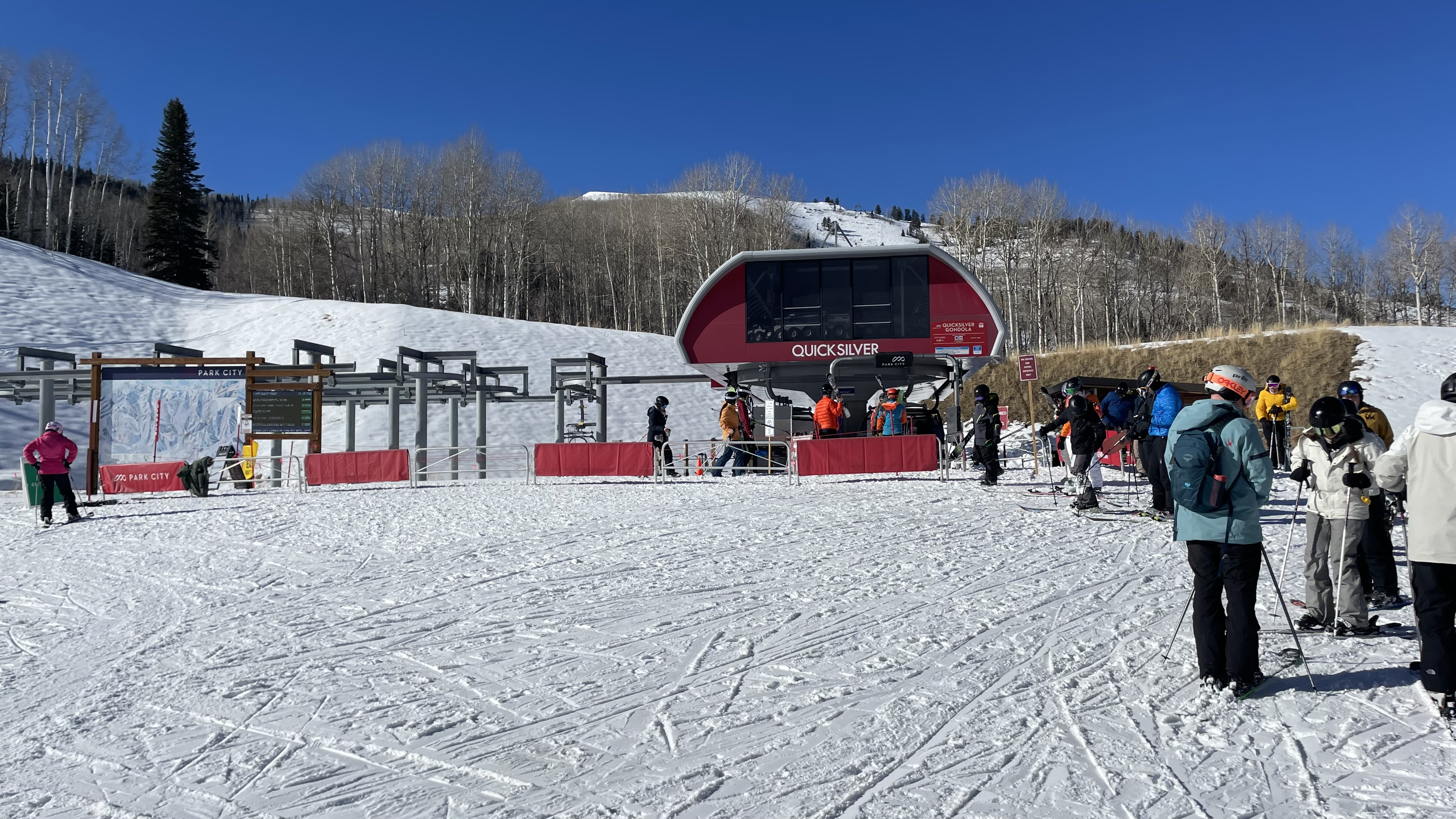
- Interactive map of Quicksilver Gondola

Overview
- Status: Operational
- Country: United States of America
- Built by: Doppelmayr USA

Operation
- Operator: Park City Mountain
- Trip duration: ~8.5 minutes

Technical features
- Line length: 1.5 miles
- Operating speed: 8.10 meters per second

Quicksilver Gondola is a gondola located in Park City, Utah. Constructed by Doppelmayr in 2015, the gondola carries eight people per cabin and has a length of roughly 1.5 miles. It was part of a $50 million expansion program that merged the once-separate Park City Mountain and Canyons Resorts under Vail Resorts. The merger made Park City the largest lift-service ski resort in the United States.

== History ==
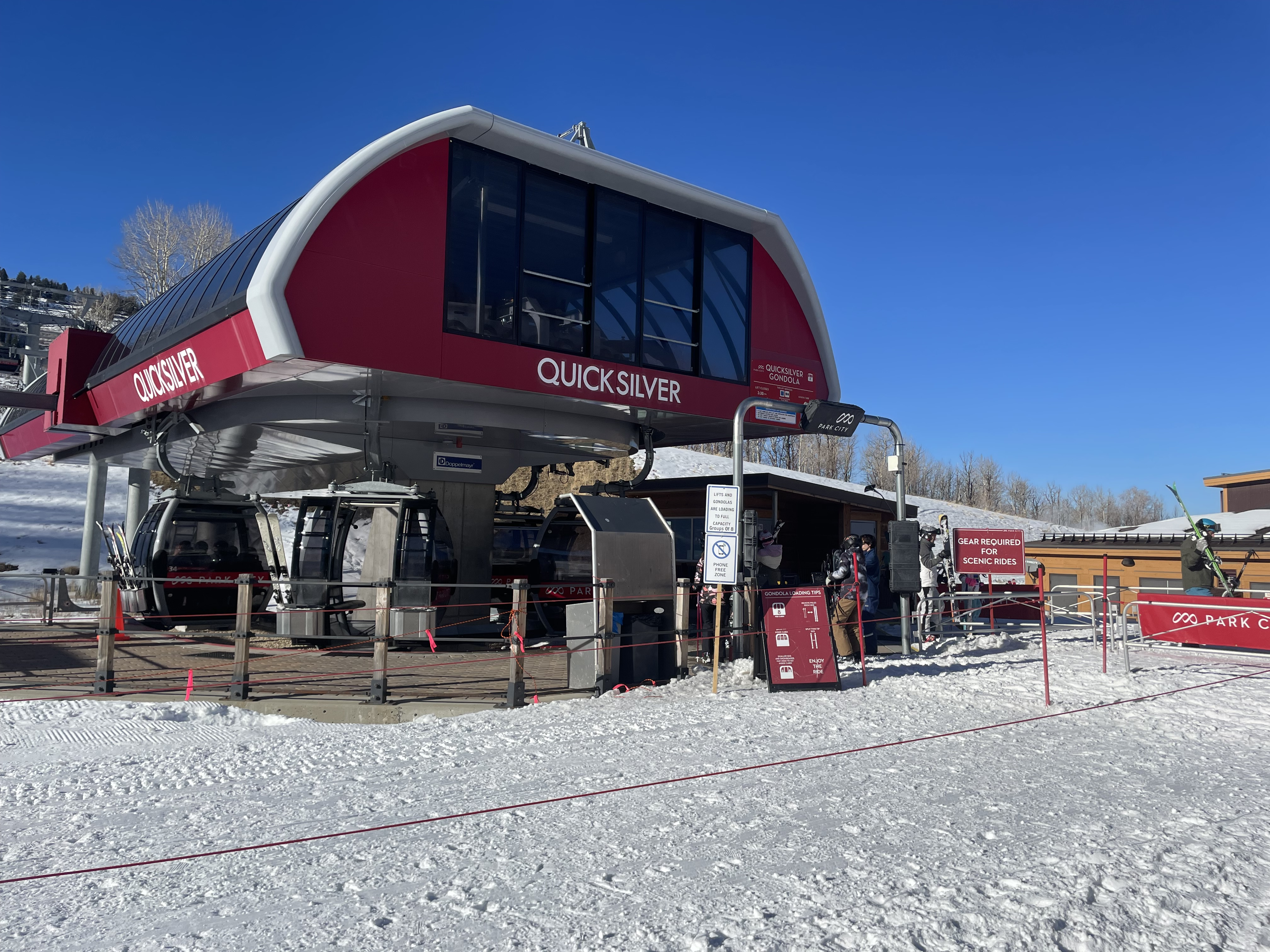
The Quicksilver Gondola was built in 2015 by Doppelmayr after the merger of Park City Mountain Resort and Canyons.

Before 2015, Park City Mountain Resort and the Canyons Resort were separate, with Powdr Corporation and Vail Resorts owning the two resorts respectively. However, after Powdr failing to renew its lease on Park City Mountain and a legal battle with Vail and Talisker Corporation (The entity that owned the land that Park City Mountain was operating on), Vail acquired Park City Mountain for $182.5 million. The company then developed plans for a $50 million renovation project of Park City Mountain, that, among other upgrades would merge Park City Mountain and the Canyons via the Quicksilver Gondola. After construction by Doppelmayr completed in 2015, Park City transformed into the largest lift-serviced ski resort in the United States.
