= Alzina =

Alzina is the name of:

== Given name ==
- Alzina Stevens (1849–1900), American labor leader, social reformer and editor
- Alzina Toups, American chef

ALZINA

== Surname ==
- Cécile Alzina (born 1981), French snowboarder
- Ignatio Francisco Alzina
- Laura Alzina, Swiss artistic gymnast
