= Hugo Lemay =

Canadian snowboarder (born 1983)

Hugo Lemay (born January 30, 1983) is a Canadian snowboarder, specializing in the halfpipe event.

Born in Quebec City, Quebec, Lemay made his World Cup debut in December 2001 at Whistler, British Columbia, Canada.

Lemay's best World Cup season thus far came in 2005, when he placed 17th overall in the halfpipe standings. He has competed at one FIS Snowboarding World Championships, finishing 13th in 2005.

Lemay competed at the 2006 Winter Olympics, the halfpipe. He finished 24th in the first round and 12th in the second, leaving him 18th overall, and not advancing to the final.
