= Mathieu Justafre =

French snowboarder (born 1980)

Personal information
- Nationality: French
- Born: 24 March 1980 (age 45); Perpignan, France

Sport
- Sport: Snowboarding

Mathieu Justafre (born 24 March 1980) is a French snowboarder. He competed in the men's halfpipe event at the 2002 Winter Olympics.
