= Fuel TV (international) =

Australian sports network

FUEL TV
- Country: Portugal
- Broadcast area: EMEA; Australia and New Zealand; Portugal; North America; Asia-Pacific
- Headquarters: Lisbon, Portugal

Programming
- Language: English
- Picture format: 16:9 576i (SDTV); 16:9 1080i (HDTV)

Ownership
- Owner: FUEL TV Global, S.A.

History
- Launched: March 2004; April 2008 (Portugal)
- Former names: Fuel (2004–05)

Links
- Website: fuel.tv

Fuel TV is a sports-orientated digital cable and satellite television action sports channel owned by FUEL TV Global, S.A. The channel is focused on the culture of extreme sports such as skateboarding, snowboarding, wakeboarding, motocross, surfing, BMX, FMX and is available in many countries including Portugal, China, North Africa and the Middle East.

Originally, Fuel TV was launched as a weekly regional music and extreme sports television series in September 2001 by video producer Chris Braly and aired on American WB affiliate WFLI-TV (channel 53, now a CW affiliate) in Chattanooga, Tennessee in the Saturday evening programming slot.

In July 2003 News Corporation began negotiations to buy out the Fuel TV trademark and concept from Chris Braly and make it a part of their Fox-Sports Network. As a rebranded cable and satellite channel, Fuel TV featured extreme sports programs ranging from original series, exclusive events, licensed films and creative interstitials.

In 2007, News Corporation sold Fuel TV to Portuguese-based FLUID Youth Culture, S.A. after an agreement was reached in order to acquire Fuel TV in Portugal with the rest of the international operations being later acquired in 2014. In 2008, Fuel TV was launched in Portugal in partnership with the network service provider MEO.

Between 2010 and 2014, Fuel TV expanded their business to the EMEA region with the channel being launched in over 40 countries in the EMEA region, reaching 8 million households.

The American Fuel TV channel was re-branded as Fox Sports 2 in August 2013 following the seamless transition of Speed to Fox Sports 1. The network continued overseas, most prominently as an online streaming service and FAST channel available on different platforms.

== History ==
=== Origin ===
Chris Braly originally conceived and developed an independently produced television series named "Fuel TV" in February 2000. Braly was a video producer and the president of BIG Studios and he used a paid programming approach with the WB affiliate network WFLI-TV to air Fuel TV as a regular weekly series on channel 53. Fuel TV launched on the network on September 8, 2001, as a regional music and extreme sports weekly broadcast that aired Saturday nights at midnight for four seasons.

The series' appeal, particularly with younger viewers, and the subsequent rise of extreme action sports programs in the early 21st century, led to the independently produced series becoming very popular in the America and catching the attention of the networks.

=== Fox Sports takeover ===
Original FOX owned logo, used from October 1, 2003, to August 17, 2012

After seeing the increasing viewership of Fuel TV, and with the intent of expanding the coverage of extreme sports to a wider audience, CJ Oliveras, a producer at Fox Sports Net, eventually approached Braly and negotiated a buyout of the concept and trademark. Braly produced the final episode of his Fuel TV series on WFLI in September 2003, becoming a full-time satellite and cable channel on News Corporations Fox Network once FOX had finalized the buyout from BIG Studios.

From 2003, Fuel TV aired numerous original reality programs, including FirstHand, Drive Thru Australia, Camp Woodward and many more, which documented extreme sport stories and events. The television channel on Fox also aired live sporting events such as X-Games, Supercross 450 and namely the Ultimate Fighting Championship (UFC). In 2011, Fuel TV became the official cable home of the UFC as part of a broader agreement between Fox and The Mixed Martial Arts Promotion. By mid 2012 Fuel TV's programming consisted solely of combat sports such as MMA, boxing, as well as fighting analysis shows like UFC Tonight and The Undercard, and reruns of reality programs from Fox's sister channel Speed. It also showed live coverage of all ASP World Tour men's surfing events. It was also used as an "overflow" channel for Fox Sports Australia when all three main Fox Sports are being used for other obligations and they have a fourth, motorsport/extreme sport obligation, which get shown on FUEL TV live, and delayed on Fox Sports.

Fuel TV's second logo used from 2012 until the shift to streaming network in 2014

By 2013 Fuel TV had moved away from its original concept as an extreme action sports outlet towards a mainstream, worldwide live-sports channel. The 2012-13 Premier League was aired on Fuel TV along with English Super League (Rugby League) matches.

=== Shift to streaming ===
In early 2013 the Fox Network made the decision to rebrand both its sport channels to "better align with its future growth goals". Fox's primary sport channel, Speed, was rebranded as Fox Sports 1 simultaneously with Fuel TV's rebranding as Fox Sports 2.

The Fuel TV cable channel in Europe was unaffected by this change, and is offered on local cable and IPTV services such as Vodafone TV.

==== Online platform ====
Television consumption began to change in the mid-2010s with the rise of online 24/7 streaming channels allowing consumers to access shows on demand and without a traditional television set. In early 2014 Fuel TV launched an online website, "fuel.tv", with 24/7 streaming content of all its original reality shows as well as live sports coverage of extreme action sports events including Cape Fear Surfing, Free ride world championships and many more. The platform features 900 hours of new programming every year, of those 700 hours being Live Events and 200 hours of exclusive high-quality content from 20+ Original Series, Documentaries, Talk Shows and Branded Content. It has an extensive library of over 5000 hours of award-winning programming, with the main goal of "inspiring and entertaining both action sports fans and viewers who are drawn to the sights, sounds, personalities and culture of the extreme action sport scene". There is also an option for Fuel TV + which is a paid subscription, costing $4.99 per month, where users can access ad-free and downloadable content.

==== 7Plus partnership ====
As a now independent business, after splitting with the Fox Network, Fuel TV is seen in more than 103 countries, broadcast in 5 languages to more than 770 million homes each year. Following the channels switch to a purely online streaming website, Fuel TV Australia and The Seven Network signed an agreement in November 2019 that saw a 24/7 streaming channel running on the 7plus platform as well as dedicate block programming on 7mate.

Fuel TV functions as a Free Ad-supported Streaming Television (FAST) channel under The Seven Networks on demand, online streaming network 7plus. The FAST channel is also available in other countries through the streaming service Plex.

The Seven Network's coverage of the 2020 Tokyo Olympic Games combined with the addition of action sports such as Skateboarding and Surfing to the games allowed Fuel TV to play a key role in distributing sports content to Australians. During the games, reruns of significant matchups in surfing and skateboarding heats were played on Fuel TV allowing those who were unable to watch the event live could re-live the action. An example of this is Australian surfer Owen Wright's Bronze medal final which was replayed 14 times on Fuel TV throughout the games.

== Original programming ==
Reality TV was at the forefront of television viewership across the world in the early 2000s, particularly in the US with shows such as Big Brother and Survivor. In 2001 Survivor was ranked 6th on the primetime television series of the 2001–02 season, one place above Monday Night Football. Celebrity lives, dating shows and extreme sports documentary's present non-actors in legitimately natural settings and situations working without a script. Reality TV stakes its claim with viewers to regard its depictions as unadorned and spontaneous truthful documentation of natural reality and it was this changing television culture that gave rise to its popularity. Coinciding with the rise of reality TV was launch of Fuel TV in the early 2000s who ultimately released many original series documenting the lives of extreme sports stars. These shows, which were in most cases the first of their kind, ran for many seasons and became the core programming structure of Fuel TV.

=== Firsthand ===
Firsthand is a Fuel TV original series with its premiere season airing in 2003 on the Fuel TV cable network on the Fox Network. Running its 13th season this year, Firsthand brings viewers up close and personal with the daily lives of today's top action sports athletes. Documenting athletes competition preparation and performance as well as laid back free-sessions and daily life away from sport, Firsthand offers exclusive footage of world-class pros pushing the limits of their riding. With between 16 – 18 episodes per season going for an average of around 22 minutes, Firsthand has boasted a number of all-time legends in their respective sports. Some notable guests include Owen Wright, Australian pro surfer and as of 2021, Olympic Gold Medallist. Travis Pastrana, a 4-time Rally America Supercross Champion and multiple X Games Gold Medallist. Ryan Sheckler, an American professional skateboarder who was ranked 5th in Fox Weekly's "15 Most influential Skateboarders of All Time".

=== Camp Woodward ===
Camp Woodward is a world-class skateboarding and BMX facility located in Pennsylvania, US where many professional athletes go to train and compete against the best in the world. In 2007, Fuel TV followed a group of young skateboarders and BMX riders into their 3-month training camp at Camp Woodward. Director Dave Paine documents the extreme highs and lows of the young athletes pushing their limits in an attempt to impress their well rebound coaches which include the likes of Cody Davis, Hunter Bagent and Lary Schmidt. In 2022 Camp Woodward will be going into its 9th season, after being put on hold due to the COVID-19 global pandemic, with athletes coming from across the world including places like Argentina and Australia with ages ranging from just 10 years old all the way to 16 years old.

=== Drive Thru Australia ===
Premiering on March 7, 2009, on Fox Networks Fuel TV, a small crew of photographers follow pro surfers Donavon Frankenreiter, Benji Weatherley and Pat O'Connell around Australia on their journey to find secluded beaches and untouched waves. Stopping at numerous campsites in their Britz RV, the trio travel from New South Wales all the way to Western Australia, meeting many interesting people and visiting many extraordinary places. After being received well by the Australian public, the Drive Thru crew came back for a second season in 2010 this time will infamous pro surfers Andy Irons, Shane Dorian and Mark Ochilupo. Cruising up the East Coast of Australia the 13 episodes document the struggles of four wheel driving in Queensland to the exhilaration of finding perfect barrels on the South Coast of New South Wales. The Drive Thru franchise has since expanded with seasons 3 – 6 located in South America, Europe and New Zealand respectively.

=== The Adventures of Danny and "The Dingo" ===
Initially airing on the Fuel TV cable television channel on the Fox network in early 2008, the Fuel TV original reality television series documents two-time Olympic silver medallist Danny Kass and snowboarder personality Luke "The Dingo" Trembath on a cross country trip across the U.S. in search of the next Grenade team member. The Fuel TV crew follows these two personalities as they participate in extreme sports such as skydiving, snowboarding and bungee jumping, documenting the laughs, screams and pain of two goofy athletes. With its final season airing in 2012, the documentary series shifted to a global scale with their 5th season being filmed throughout Europe.

=== PULL ===
In 2004 Alliance, an American wakeboarding and water skiing magazine, launched Fuel TV's premier reality television series PULL. It was originally a magazine style television show that introduced the sport, lifestyle and personalities of wakeboarding to millions of people outside the endemic circle. Being the first wakeboarding show of its kind, director Tony Smith, with his limited budget, documented 5 Alliance magazine athletes as they wake boarded across the world. PULL follows Bob Soven, Jimmy LaRichie, Jeff Langley, Mike Olson and Pat Panakos through the rivers of the Milton Sound in New Zealand all the way to the Monster Energy Wake Park in Texas, US as they compete amongst themselves and against other riders for the Triple Crown. Airing its 6th and final season in 2010, PULL paved the way for other reality television series on Fuel TV.

=== Other series ===
As of March 2024.

- Action Sports Plus
- Beyond the Bib
- Breaking Trail
- Bubba's World
- Built to Shred
- Camp James
- Camp Woodward
- Catch Up
- Custom
- Drive Thru Australia
- Fresh Lines
- FirstHand
- Inside the Outdoors
- Microdose
- Pull
- Riding Portugal
- Setups
- Shorebreak
- Snowbound
- Snowchef
- Surfing Life TV
- The Captain and Casey Show
- The Great Ride Open
- The Kickback
- The Moto: Inside the Outdoors
- The Standard Snowboard Show
- Thrillbillies
- Wave Crushers
- Zion's Way

== Availability ==
- Portugal: In Portugal it is available on cable, satellite and IPTV platforms. It covers national and international action sports events, including skate, surfing, bodyboarding and mountain biking which are popular in Portugal.
- Republic of Ireland: The channel launched in Ireland through Vodafone TV on 20 January 2016.

== See also ==
- List of sports television channels
- Seven Network
- 7plus
- Reality television
