= Martin Černík =

Czech snowboarder (born 1976)

Personal information
- Nationality: Czech
- Born: 25 August 1976 (age 48); Hořice, Czechoslovakia

Sport
- Sport: Snowboarding

Martin Černík (born 25 August 1976) is a Czech former snowboarder. He competed in the men's halfpipe event at the 2006 Winter Olympics.
