= Marek Sąsiadek =

Polish snowboarder

Personal information
- Nationality: Polish
- Born: 2 November 1978 (age 46); Rybnik, Poland

Sport
- Sport: Snowboarding

Marek Sąsiadek (born 2 November 1978) is a Polish snowboarder. He competed in the men's halfpipe event at the 2002 Winter Olympics.
