= Micael Lundmark =

Swedish snowboarder (1986–2023)

Personal information
- Nationality: Swedish
- Born: 27 September 1986; Skellefteå, Sweden
- Died: 16 June 2023 (aged 36); Stockholm, Sweden

Sport
- Sport: Snowboarding

Micael Lundmark (27 September 1986 – 16 June 2023) was a Swedish snowboarder. He competed in the men's halfpipe event at the 2006 Winter Olympics. He died while filming himself vaulting from the bridge Västerbron into Riddarfjärden in Stockholm, Sweden. His remains were found on 27 August 2023.
