= Lisa Odynski =

American snowboarder (born 1974)

Personal information
- Born: 29 December 1974 (age 50) Reno, Nevada, U.S.

Sport
- Sport: Snowboarding

Lisa Odynski (born 29 December 1974) is an American snowboarder, born in Reno, Nevada. She competed in women's parallel giant slalom at the 2002 Winter Olympics in Salt Lake City.
