= Mikael Sandy =

Swedish snowboarder

Personal information
- Nationality: Swedish
- Born: 16 July 1982 (age 42); Leksand, Sweden

Sport
- Sport: Snowboarding

Mikael Sandy (born 16 July 1982) is a Swedish snowboarder. He competed in the men's halfpipe event at the 2006 Winter Olympics.
