= Florine Valdenaire =

French snowboarder (born 1982)

Personal information
- Nationality: French
- Born: 22 January 1982 (age 43); Remiremont, France

Sport
- Sport: Snowboarding

Florine Valdenaire (born 22 January 1982) is a French snowboarder. She competed in the women's parallel giant slalom event at the 2002 Winter Olympics.
