= Frederik Kalbermatten =

Swiss snowboarder

Personal information
- Nationality: Swiss
- Born: 25 May 1981 (age 43); Saas-Fee, Switzerland

Sport
- Sport: Snowboarding

Frederik Kalbermatten (born 25 May 1981) is a Swiss snowboarder. He competed in the men's halfpipe event at the 2006 Winter Olympics.
