= Laurence Rochat =

Swiss cross-country skier

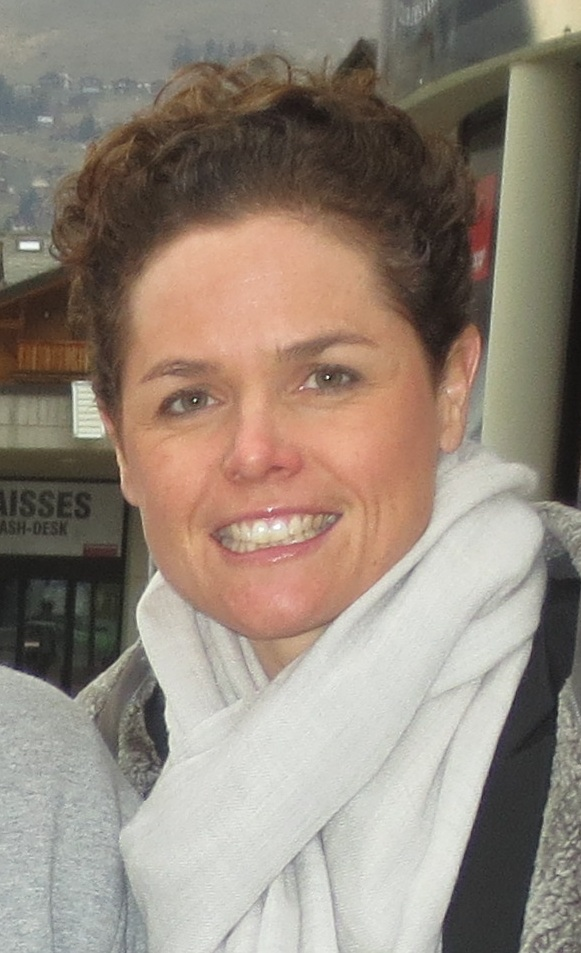

Personal information
- Nationality: Switzerland
- Born: August 1, 1979 (age 46) Pompaples, Switzerland

Sport
- Sport: Skiing
- Club: SC Vallée de Joux

World Cup career
- Seasons: 12 – (1999–2010)
- Indiv. starts: 126
- Indiv. podiums: 0
- Team starts: 22
- Team podiums: 0
- Overall titles: 0 – (44th in 2006)
- Discipline titles: 0
Medal record
Women's cross-country skiing
Representing Switzerland
Olympic Games
| Bronze medal – third place | 2002 Salt Lake City | 4 × 5 km relay |

Laurence Rochat (born 1 August 1979) is a Swiss cross-country skier who has competed since 1996. She won a bronze medal in the 4 × 5 km relay at the 2002 Winter Olympics in Salt Lake City and had her best individual finish with a 15th place in the Individual sprint at the 2006 Winter Olympics in Turin.

Rochat's best finish at the Nordic skiing World Championships was a 12th in the 30 km event in 2005. She also has nineteen victories at various levels in her career since 1998.

== Cross-country skiing results ==
All results are sourced from the International Ski Federation (FIS).

=== Olympic Games ===
- 1 medal – (1 bronze)

| Year | Age | 10 km | 15 km | Pursuit | 30 km | Sprint | 4 × 5 km relay | Team sprint |
|---|---|---|---|---|---|---|---|---|
| 2002 | 22 | DNF | — | 22 | 21 | — | Bronze | —N/a |
| 2006 | 26 | 25 | —N/a | — | — | 15 | 11 | — |
| 2010 | 30 | — | —N/a | — | DNF | — | — | — |

=== World Championships ===
| Year | Age | 10 km | 15 km | Pursuit | 30 km | Sprint | 4 × 5 km relay | Team sprint |
|---|---|---|---|---|---|---|---|---|
| 2001 | 21 | 33 | 28 | — | — | CNX^{[a]} | 7 | —N/a |
| 2003 | 23 | 39 | — | 43 | — | — | 10 | —N/a |
| 2005 | 25 | 27 | —N/a | DNF | 12 | — | 11 | 8 |
| 2007 | 27 | — | —N/a | — | DNF | 25 | 9 | 14 |

a. ^{1} Cancelled due to extremely cold weather.

=== World Cup ===
==== Season standings ====
| Season | Age | Discipline standings | | | | | Ski Tour standings | |
| Season | Age | Overall | Distance | Long Distance | Middle Distance | Sprint | Tour de Ski | World Cup Final |
|---|---|---|---|---|---|---|---|---|
| 1999 | 19 | NC | —N/a | NC | —N/a | — | —N/a | —N/a |
| 2000 | 20 | NC | —N/a | NC | NC | NC | —N/a | —N/a |
| 2001 | 21 | 70 | —N/a | —N/a | —N/a | 51 | —N/a | —N/a |
| 2002 | 22 | 54 | —N/a | —N/a | —N/a | 44 | —N/a | —N/a |
| 2003 | 23 | 100 | —N/a | —N/a | —N/a | 67 | —N/a | —N/a |
| 2004 | 24 | 52 | 34 | —N/a | —N/a | NC | —N/a | —N/a |
| 2005 | 25 | 52 | 54 | —N/a | —N/a | 27 | —N/a | —N/a |
| 2006 | 26 | 44 | 44 | —N/a | —N/a | 29 | —N/a | —N/a |
| 2007 | 27 | 49 | 50 | —N/a | —N/a | 34 | DNF | —N/a |
| 2008 | 28 | 68 | 42 | —N/a | —N/a | NC | — | — |
| 2009 | 29 | 69 | 74 | —N/a | —N/a | 56 | — | — |
| 2010 | 30 | 79 | 64 | —N/a | —N/a | 73 | — | — |
