= Nadia Livers =

Swiss snowboarder

Personal information
- Nationality: Swiss
- Born: 17 October 1979 (age 45); Chur, Switzerland

Sport
- Sport: Snowboarding

Nadia Livers (born 17 October 1979) is a Swiss snowboarder. She competed in the women's parallel giant slalom event at the 2002 Winter Olympics.
