= Haritz Zunzunegui =

Spanish cross-country skier (born 1975)

Personal information
- Nationality: Spanish
- Born: 1 May 1975 (age 49); Tolosa, Spain

Sport
- Sport: Cross-country skiing

Haritz Zunzunegui (born 1 May 1975) is a Spanish cross-country skier. He competed at the 1998 Winter Olympics and the 2002 Winter Olympics.
