= Halvor Skramstad Lunn =

Norwegian snowboarder

Halvor Skramstad Lunn (born 18 September 1980) is a retired Norwegian snowboarder.

He was born in Kongsberg, and represented Kongsberg IF. His specialty was the halfpipe, and he finished 31st at the 2002 Winter Olympics, 37th at the 2005 World Snowboard Championships and 30th at the 2006 Winter Olympics. In the FIS Snowboard World Cup he reached the podium six times between 2002 and 2006, winning a race in January 2006 in Leysin. He left the World Cup circuit after 2006, but later competed briefly in snowboardcross.
