= Patrick Mächler =

Swiss cross-country skier

Personal information
- Nationality: Swiss
- Born: 28 November 1972 (age 52); Lachen, Switzerland

Sport
- Sport: Cross-country skiing

Patrick Mächler (born 28 November 1972) is a Swiss former cross-country skier. He competed at the 1998 Winter Olympics and the 2002 Winter Olympics.
