= Andrea Huber =

Swiss cross-country skier

Personal information
- Nationality: Switzerland
- Born: 9 May 1975 (age 51) Samedan, Switzerland

Sport
- Sport: Skiing
- Club: SC Alpina St. Moritz

World Cup career
- Seasons: 12 – (1993–2004)
- Indiv. starts: 83
- Indiv. podiums: 0
- Team starts: 19
- Team podiums: 0
- Overall titles: 0 – (38th in 2000)
Medal record
Women's cross-country skiing
Representing Switzerland
Olympic Games
Bronze medal – third place	2002 Salt Lake City	4 × 5 km relay

Andrea Huber (born 9 May 1975) is a Swiss cross-country skier who competed from 1993 to 2004. She won a bronze medal in the 4 × 5 km relay at the 2002 Winter Olympics in Salt Lake City and finished 27th in the individual sprint at those same games.

Huber's best finish at the FIS Nordic World Ski Championships was a 17th in the 5 km events both in 1997 and 1999. She won fourteen races at various levels in her career from 1994 to 2004.

== Cross-country skiing results ==
All results are sourced from the International Ski Federation (FIS).

=== Olympic Games ===
- 1 medal – (1 bronze)

Year	Age	5 km	10 km	15 km	Pursuit	30 km	Sprint	4 × 5 km relay
1998	22	45	—N/a	—	DNS	—	—N/a	4
2002	26	—N/a	—	—	—	—	27	Bronze

=== World Championships ===
Year	Age	5 km	10 km	15 km	Pursuit	30 km	Sprint	4 × 5 km relay
1995	19	61	—N/a	—	56	—	—N/a	7
1997	21	17	—N/a	—	41	36	—N/a	8
1999	23	17	—N/a	—	DNF	—	—N/a	5
2001	25	—N/a	44	—	—	CNX^{[a]}	—	7
2003	27	—N/a	27	—	40	—	—	10

a. ^{1} Cancelled due to extremely cold weather.

=== World Cup ===
==== Season standings ====
Season	Age					
Season	Age	Overall	Distance	Long Distance	Middle Distance	Sprint
1993	17	NC	—N/a	—N/a	—N/a	—N/a
1994	18	NC	—N/a	—N/a	—N/a	—N/a
1995	19	NC	—N/a	—N/a	—N/a	—N/a
1996	20	69	—N/a	—N/a	—N/a	—N/a
1997	21	48	—N/a	NC	—N/a	49
1998	22	63	—N/a	NC	—N/a	59
1999	23	42	—N/a	64	—N/a	32
2000	24	38	—N/a	NC	57	24
2001	25	81	—N/a	—N/a	—N/a	57
2002	26	59	—N/a	—N/a	—N/a	28
2003	27	46	—N/a	—N/a	—N/a	42
2004	28	93	NC	—N/a	—N/a	58
