= Lisa Kosglow =

American snowboarder (born 1973)

Personal information
- Born: 18 October 1973 (age 52) Schenectady New York, U.S.

Sport
- Sport: Snowboarding

Lisa Kosglow (born 18 October 1973) is an American snowboarder, born in Schenectady, New York. She competed in women's giant slalom at the 1998 Winter Olympics in Nagano, and in women's parallel giant slalom at the 2002 Winter Olympics in Salt Lake City. Kosglow is a two-time silver medalist at the ISF World Championships and won multiple National Championship titles in snowboard racing.

Kosglow retired in 2006 after a 13-year career with the US national team.
