= Marcel Hitz =

Swiss snowboarder

Personal information
- Nationality: Swiss
- Born: 3 September 1974 (age 50); Adligenswil, Switzerland

Sport
- Sport: Snowboarding

Marcel Hitz (born 3 September 1974) is a Swiss former snowboarder. He competed in the men's halfpipe event at the 2002 Winter Olympics.
