= Patrick Rölli =

Swiss skier

Personal information
- Nationality: Swiss
- Born: 30 October 1972 (age 52); Lucerne, Switzerland

Sport
- Sport: Cross-country skiing

Patrick Rölli (born 30 October 1972) is a Swiss cross-country skier. He competed in the men's 30 kilometre freestyle mass start event at the 2002 Winter Olympics.
