= Daniel Migneault =

Canadian snowboarder

Personal information
- Born: 16 February 1978 (age 47); Baie-Comeau, Quebec, Canada

Sport
- Sport: Snowboarding

Daniel Migneault (born 16 February 1978) is a Canadian snowboarder. He competed in the men's halfpipe event at the 2002 Winter Olympics.
