= Danny Kass =

American snowboarder

Personal information
- Born: September 21, 1982 (age 44) Pompton Plains, New Jersey, U.S.
- Height: 5 ft 6 in (168 cm)
- Weight: 145 lb (66 kg)
Medal record
Men's snowboarding
Representing the United States
Olympic Games
Silver medal – second place	2002 Salt Lake City	Halfpipe
Silver medal – second place	2006 Torino	Halfpipe
X Games
Gold medal – first place	2001	Halfpipe
Silver medal – second place	2003	Halfpipe
Silver medal – second place	2004	Slopestyle
Silver medal – second place	2004	Halfpipe
Silver medal – second place	2005	Slopestyle
Bronze medal – third place	2005	Superpipe

Daniel Kass (born September 21, 1982) is an American professional snowboarder who has competed at the Olympic level. In Snowboarding at the 2002 Winter Olympics, Kass won silver in the Men's Halfpipe.

== Career ==
Kass was born in Pompton Plains, New Jersey. He was raised in the Scenic Lakes section of Vernon Township, New Jersey, and attended Vernon Township High School. He began snowboarding in the area at the age of twelve. His home slopes are what are now known as Hidden Valley and Mountain Creek ski resorts, both located in the mountains of Vernon Township and Highland Lakes. After several years of shredding around the Mid-Atlantic States, Kass entered the Okemo Mountain School in Vermont. In 2001, Kass broke out into what has become one of the most successful contest streaks in snowboarding with four US Open Championships, seven Winter X Games medals and two Olympic silver medals.

During the winter of 2006, Kass fought his way back from a slow start in the US Grand Prix Circuit to qualify for the Olympics in Torino for the second time in a row. Kass took home another silver medal with back-to-back 1080s and his signature smooth style.

Kass and his brother Matt Kass were the founders of Grenade Gloves, which specialized in snowboarding gloves, accessories, and other extreme sporting gear. Grenade ceased being in business around 2021. He has since founded a new company that produces hats called Dover.

Kass is one of the stars of The Adventures of Danny and The Dingo on Fuel TV. He also has a podcast with Luke "The Dingo" Trembath on the Monster Energy's YouTube channel, called Unleashed.
