= Wilhelm Aschwanden =

Swiss cross-country skier (born 1969)

Personal information
- Nationality: Switzerland
- Born: 18 December 1969 (age 56) Langnau im Emmental, Switzerland

Sport
- Sport: Skiing
- Club: SC Marbach

World Cup career
- Seasons: 1992–2004
- Indiv. starts: 98
- Indiv. podiums: 0
- Team starts: 20
- Team podiums: 0
- Overall titles: 0 – (46th in 1999)
- Discipline titles: 0

Wilhelm Aschwanden (born 18 December 1969) is a Swiss cross-country skier who competed from 1992 to 2004. Competing in three Winter Olympics, he earned his best career and individual finishes at Nagano in 1998 with a sixth in the 4 × 10 km relay and a 22nd in the 50 km event, respectively.

Aschwanden's best finish at the FIS Nordic World Ski Championships was 26th in the 30 km event at Trondheim in 1997. His best World Cup finish was tenth in a 10 km event in Italy in 1998.

Aschwanden earned thirteen career victories at lesser events up to 50 km from 2001 to 2004.

== World Cup results ==
All results are sourced from the International Ski Federation (FIS).

=== World Cup standings ===
Season	Age	Season standings				
Season	Age	Overall	Distance	Long Distance	Middle Distance	Sprint
1992	23	NC	—N/a	—N/a	—N/a	—N/a
1993	24	NC	—N/a	—N/a	—N/a	—N/a
1994	25	NC	—N/a	—N/a	—N/a	—N/a
1995	26	87	—N/a	—N/a	—N/a	—N/a
1996	27	NC	—N/a	—N/a	—N/a	—N/a
1997	28	92	—N/a	57	—N/a	DNP
1998	29	103	—N/a	NC	—N/a	81
1999	30	46	—N/a	61	—N/a	39
2000	31	112	—N/a	NC	65	NC
2001	32	76	—N/a	—N/a	—N/a	NC
2002	33	NC	—N/a	—N/a	—N/a	NC
2003	34	NC	—N/a	—N/a	—N/a	DNP
2004	35	123	83	—N/a	—N/a	DNP
