= Milena Meisser =

Swiss snowboarder

Personal information
- Nationality: Swiss
- Born: 2 April 1979 (age 45); Davos, Switzerland

Sport
- Sport: Snowboarding

Milena Meisser (born 2 April 1979) is a Swiss snowboarder. She competed in the women's parallel giant slalom event at the 2002 Winter Olympics.
