= Grenade Gloves =

Glove and mittens manufacturer

Grenade
- Company type: Private
- Industry: sporting goods
- Founded: 2001
- Headquarters: Portland, Oregon
- Products: snowboard gloves, outerwear, apparel, motocross gloves

Grenade Gloves Inc is a manufacturer of snowboard gloves/mittens. Founded by professional snowboarders Matt and Danny Kass in 2001, the company specializes in a product line aimed at snowboarders and motocross riders: gloves, outerwear, apparel, footwear, and accessories. The company's headquarters are located in Portland, Oregon.

== Company overview ==
Grenade built its first glove in 2001 and has quickly expanded into a lifestyle image. The Grenade logo was added to a full line of streetwear, stickers, and accessories soon followed by technical snowboard outerwear. Collaborations have been a big part of Grenade's designs and expansion. They have had successful collaborations with The Metal Mulisha, Hart & Huntington, and Sullen. The growth and success of the Kass brothers' vision for a genuine snowboard product that had not lost touch with the consumer was evident in 2006 when Grenade Gloves generated $5.5 million in sales.

In 2008, Grenade broke into the footwear industry designing a wide variety of styles that brandish their popular logo.

Recently, Grenade has grown into the Motocross Industry and in 2010 created a full line of MX gloves, technical gear, and apparel.

== History ==
In 2001, Grenade began when 2 time Olympic Medalist Danny Kass and his brother, who is also a professional snowboarder, Matt decided they could create an ultimate snowboard glove. They used grassroots marketing techniques and strategies to get their message out. The Grenade Glove logo was one of their biggest weapons: an image that they had liked since they were children and meshed perfectly with their consumer. "As kids we had an infatuation with G.I. Joe," said Danny.

Grenade went international in 2002 and became a global player in the snowboard industry. With Danny's 2 Olympic silver medals, 7 Winter X Medals, and 4 US Open Championships, Grenade's popularity grew along with Danny's. "Fame is good, but I just love to snowboard," he said. With Danny's popularity in the snowboard community at an all-time high, the Grenade Army was created for Grenade's most loyal followers.

The Grenade Army is a membership program for snowboarders and skaters world wide. This enables the company to stay in touch with customers. To be a member of the Grenade Army members pay a fee and receive Grenade products and access to the Grenade Army website in return. At the Grenade Army website, members can chat, buy products, and participate in missions that the Grenade Army "Generals" give them. The Grenade Army member base is currently at 10,000 members.

In March 2011 Grenade hosted its seventh annual Grenade Games at Bear Mountain, California.

== Grenade Games ==
In 2005, Grenade held its first Grenade Games at June Mountain, California. The Games, which consist of contest in super pipe, monster air, moguls, and dual slalom, draw from the amateur and professional ranks. The Grenade Games 1, 2, and 4 were held at June Mt. in 2005, 2006, and 2008 subsequently. In 2007 Grenade Games 3 was moved to Summit Snoqualmie, Washington. In 2009 and 2010 Grenade joined forces with Monster Energy to take Grenade Games 5 and 6 to Whistler Blackcomb in Whistler, British Columbia.

"We are proud to announce we are bringing The Grenade Games 5 to Whistler. With the biggest and baddest lineups ever this April, it is sure to be the best. The Grenade Games is a celebration of Snowboarding, music and everything else holy! VIVA la Games! Get ready to Ride...EH!"~Danny Kass

The Grenade Games moved to California's Bear Mountain in 2011, where the Grenade Games 7 were hosted together with Monster Energy on March 25–27.

Grenade Gloves Inc went global in 2002 and The Grenade Games became an international event when it went to Korea in 2009 and 2010, creating one of the most popular snowboarding events in the world.

== Controversy ==
Prebook for 2009-2010 Grenade CEO charges all pre-booking dealers for complete orders 6 months in advance to kick-start manufacturing. It was explained that this was the only way they could keep the company going, that Grenade CEO devised the scheme to collect the funding needed to start Chinese manufacturing for the Winter line release. This was the first time Grenade used funding directly from retail store chains and small businesses to pull financial resources in order to avoid bankruptcy, and satisfy debt & obligations with manufacturers to complete new season orders. As a direct result many shop owners share their experience in round table events with other dealers and it was shared openly that dealers dealing with Grenade during this time were also charged in advance for orders they would not receive until months later which caused a distaste and dislike for doing business with a broke company where the shops that carry the brand also are forced to bankroll the operation interest free. As a direct result, and with additional controversy in 2009–2010, many dealers decide to drop the struggling brand and cut ties with the company the following year. Grenade employees explains they knew about the scheme to save the company by charging dealers in advance, and that this is solely the idea of their CEO that comes from a computer industry and has no ties to snowboarding sports or the outdoor industry as a whole. In addition the company refused to pay for usage rights for images used on their website and in their catalog which were considered stolen as no agreement was ever proposed for permission of use.

In 2010, Grenade Gloves and their CEO Joseph Condorelli were accused of copyright infringement by a Canadian photographer. The issue has yet to be resolved.

== See also ==
- List of companies based in Oregon
