= Simone Salvati =

Italian snowboarder

Personal information
- Nationality: Italian
- Born: 5 November 1973 (age 51); Bologna, Italy

Sport
- Sport: Snowboarding

Simone Salvati (born 5 November 1973) is an Italian snowboarder. He competed at the 2002 Winter Olympics and the 2006 Winter Olympics.
