= Mariya Tikhvinskaya =

Russian snowboarder

Personal information
- Nationality: Russian
- Born: 24 February 1970 (age 55); Saint Petersburg, Russia

Sport
- Sport: Snowboarding

Mariya Tikhvinskaya (born 24 February 1970) is a Russian snowboarder. She competed in the women's parallel giant slalom event at the 2002 Winter Olympics.
