= Ana Galindo (alpine skier) =

Spanish alpine skier (born 1973)

Ana Galindo Santolaria (born 16 August 1973) is a Spanish former alpine skier who competed in the 1998 Winter Olympics and in the 2002 Winter Olympics.
