= Daniel Tyrkas =

German snowboarder

Personal information
- Nationality: German
- Born: 16 June 1975 (age 49); Erlangen, Germany

Sport
- Sport: Snowboarding

Daniel Tyrkas (born 16 June 1975) is a German former snowboarder. He competed in the men's halfpipe event at the 2002 Winter Olympics.
