= Stephen Copp =

Swedish snowboarder (born 1976)

Personal information
- Nationality: Swedish
- Born: 23 June 1976 (age 48); Skellefteå, Sweden

Sport
- Sport: Snowboarding

Stephen Copp (born 23 June 1976) is a Swedish snowboarder. He competed at the 1998 Winter Olympics and the 2002 Winter Olympics.
