= Tuomo Ojala =

Finnish snowboarder

Personal information
- Nationality: Finnish
- Born: 19 September 1979 (age 46) Lahti, Finland

Sport
- Sport: Snowboarding

Tuomo Ojala (born 19 September 1979) is a Finnish snowboarder. He competed in the men's halfpipe event at the 2002 Winter Olympics.

Ojala has a PhD in Mathematics and he was involved in snowboarding after his career as a Chairman of the board of Finnish Snowboard Association.
