= Heidi Krings =

Austrian snowboarder

Personal information
- Nationality: Austrian
- Born: 30 March 1983 (age 41); Salzburg, Austria

Sport
- Country: Austria
- Sport: Snowboarding

Heidi Krings (born 30 March 1983) is an Austrian snowboarder. She was born in Salzburg. She competed at the 2006 Winter Olympics, in parallel giant slalom.
