= Åsa Windahl =

Swedish snowboarder

Personal information
- Nationality: Swedish
- Born: 27 November 1972 (age 52); Västerås Municipality, Sweden

Sport
- Country: Sweden
- Sport: Snowboarding

Åsa Windahl (born 27 November 1972) is a Swedish snowboarder.

She was born in Västerås Municipality. She competed at the 2002 Winter Olympics, in parallel giant slalom.
