= Maria Kirchgasser =

Austrian snowboarder

Personal information
- Nationality: Austrian
- Born: 26 November 1970 (age 55) Radstadt

Sport
- Sport: Snowboarding

Maria Kirchgasser (born 26 November 1970) is an Austrian snowboarder, born in Radstadt. She competed in women's parallel giant slalom at the 2002 Winter Olympics in Salt Lake City.
