= Nicola Pederzolli =

Austrian snowboarder

Personal information
- Nationality: Austrian
- Born: 11 March 1974 (age 51); Innsbruck

Sport
- Sport: Snowboarding

Nicola Pederzolli (born 11 March 1974) is an Austrian snowboarder, born in Innsbruck. She competed in women's halfpipe at the 1998 Winter Olympics in Nagano, and in women's halfpipe at the 2002 Winter Olympics in Salt Lake City.
