= Cécile Alzina =

French snowboarder (born 1981)

Personal information
- Nationality: French
- Born: 25 June 1981 (age 43); Nice, France

Sport
- Sport: Snowboarding

Cécile Alzina (born 25 June 1981) is a French snowboarder, born in Nice. She competed in women's halfpipe at the 2006 Winter Olympics in Turin.
