= Markku Koski =

Finnish snowboarder (born 1981)

Medal record

Men's snowboarding

Representing Finland

Olympic Games
Bronze medal – third place	2006 Turin	Halfpipe

FIS Snowboarding World Championships
Gold medal – first place	2009 Gangwon	Big Air

Winter X Games
Bronze medal – third place	2003 Aspen	Superpipe

Markku Koski (born 15 October 1981) is a Finnish professional snowboarder from Sievi. He is well known within the snowboarding community for his consistent showing in half-pipe competitions and for his video parts with Standard Films. Koski won the bronze medal at 2006 Winter Olympics in the Halfpipe competition, and he won a gold medal in the Big Air competition at the 2009 Snowboard World Championships.
