= Canyons Resort =

Ski resort in Park City, Utah

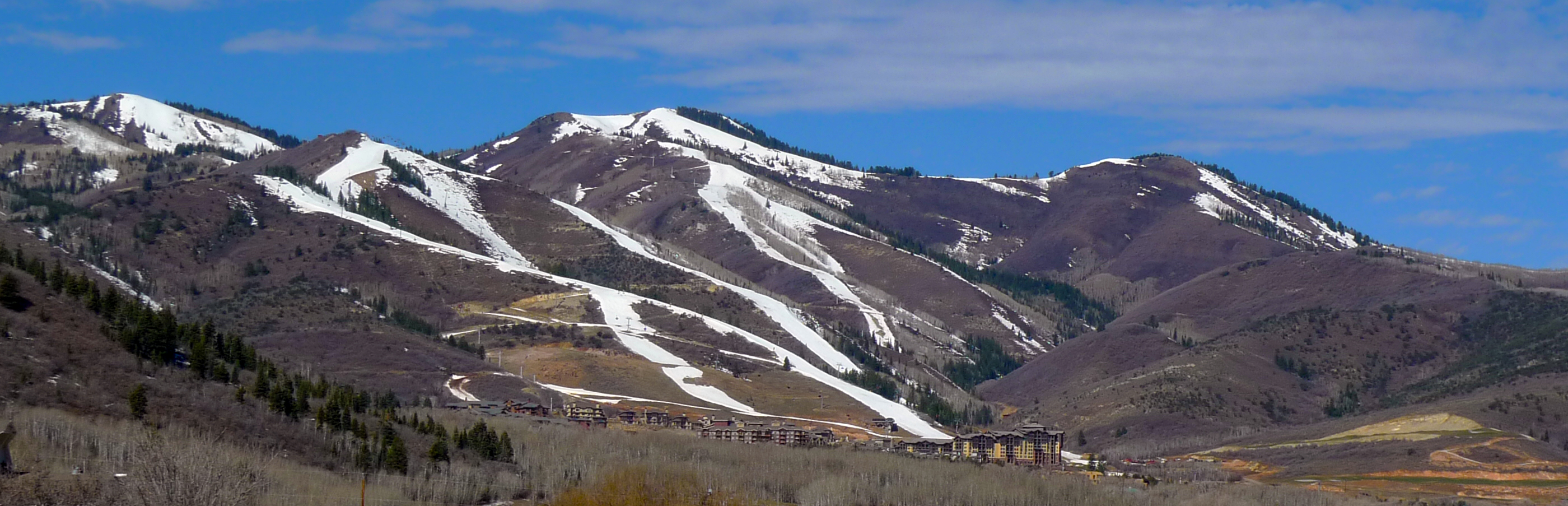
- Canyons Resort
- Interactive map of Canyons Resort
- Location: Park City, Utah
- Nearest city: Salt Lake City, Utah
- Coordinates: 40°41′10″N 111°33′23″W
- Vertical: 3,190 feet (970 m)
- Top elevation: 9,990 feet (3,040 m)
- Base elevation: 6,800 feet (2,100 m)
- Skiable area: 4,000 acres (6.3 sq mi; 16 km^{2})
- Trails: 182: 10% beginner; 44% intermediate; 46% advanced
- Lift system: 21 (19 skiable)
- Terrain parks: 3
- Snowfall: 355 inches (900 cm)
- Snowmaking: Yes
- Night skiing: No
- Website: www.canyonsresort.com

Canyons Resort was one of three alpine ski resorts located in Park City, Utah. Prior to 2015, there were 19 chairlifts, 4,000 acres (6.3 sq mi; 16 km^{2}) of skiable terrain and an average of 355 inches (9,000 mm) of snow each winter, making Canyons the largest ski and snowboard resort in Utah. The base area is located 32 miles (51 km) from the Salt Lake City International Airport, accessed via Interstate 80, and is four miles (7 km) from Main Street in Park City, along State Route 224.

In the summer of 2010, Canyons was significantly upgraded by Talisker Corporation in order to compete with the other nearby resorts. In 2013, Talisker and Vail Resorts signed a 50-year lease for Vail to run the resort operations. One year later, Vail Resorts purchased neighboring Park City Mountain Resort and merged the two resorts via an interconnect gondola, re-branding as Park City at that time. The former Canyons base area was then renamed as Canyons Village at Park City.

The resort has also been used as a major concert venue hosting artists such as Heart, Meat Loaf, Barry Manilow, Lynyrd Skynyrd, Cheap Trick, Sheryl Crow, Bon Jovi, Sting, The B-52's and The Beach Boys, The Grateful Dead.

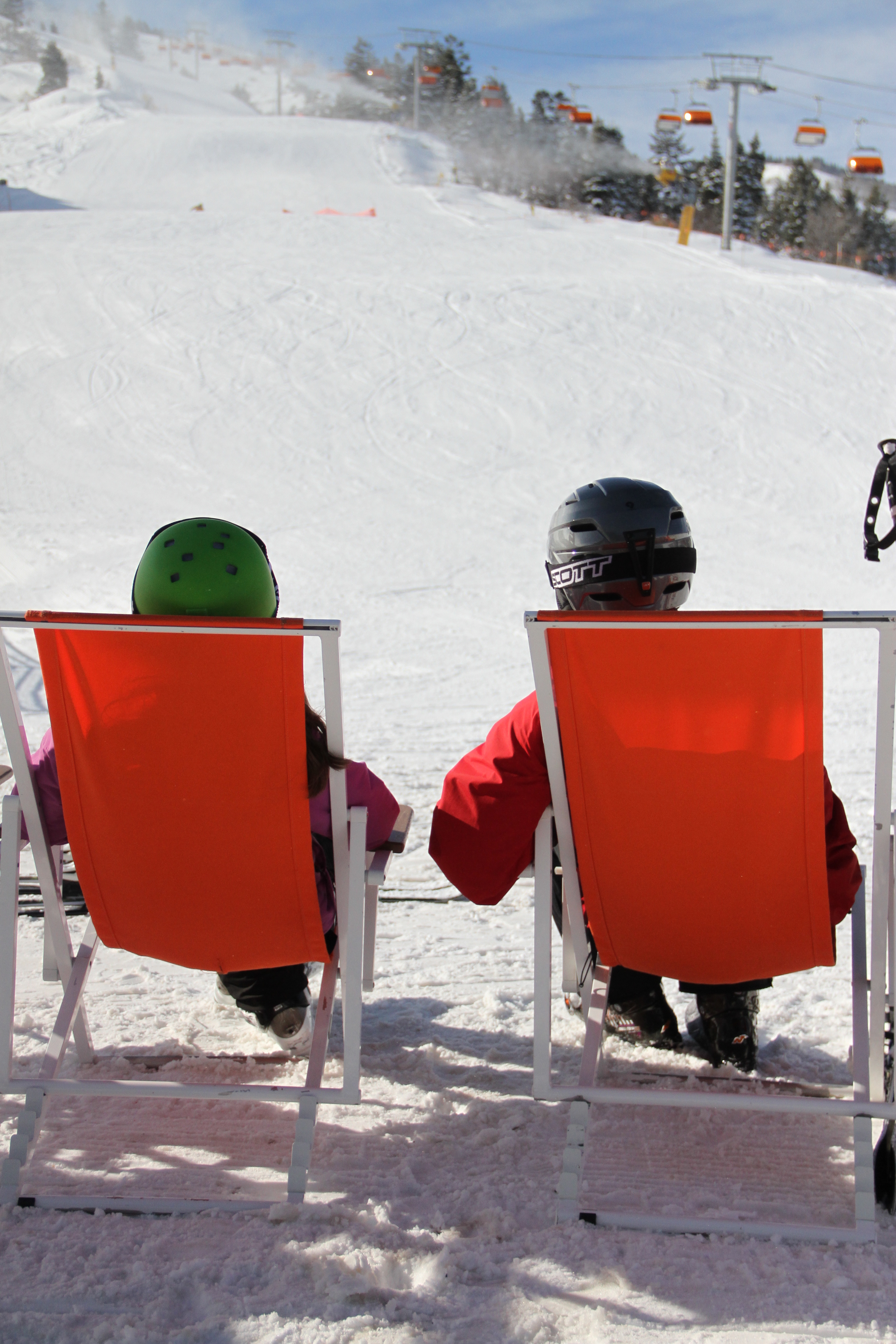
Ski Beach with Orange Bubble in the background

== History ==
The Canyons opened as Park City West in 1968, a sister resort to the nearby Park City Mountain Resort which opened five years earlier. It was renamed ParkWest in 1975 after a change in ownership, and the name was changed again in 1995 to Wolf Mountain (not to be confused with the small ski area of the same name near Ogden, Utah) for two seasons, then became The Canyons in 1997, after the acquisition by American Skiing Company. In 2007, American Skiing Company sold all of its assets and dissolved as an active corporation. The Canyons sale to Talisker Corporation was finalized in 2008.

In 2010, Talisker finished significant upgrades to the resort and officially changed the name to Canyons Resort. The upgrades included relocating the base terminal of Red Pine Gondola to a new gathering area called Ski Beach, installing two high speed quads (including Orange Bubble Express, the first chairlift in North America with heated seats), opening Iron Mountain and 300 acres (0.5 sq mi; 1.2 km^{2}) of new terrain, and many new dining and retail outlets.

On May 29, 2013, it was announced that Vail Resorts would operate Canyons under a 50-year lease, with six 50-year renewal options.

=== Canyons under Vail Resorts ===
Vail Resort announced a plan to combine Canyons Resort with Park City Mountain Resort through an interconnect gondola between Iron Mountain at Canyons and the Silverlode lift at PCMR in 2015. The combined areas are operating as Park City Mountain Resort, but the former Canyons base area has been renamed Canyons Village at Park City. In addition, Vail has improved snowmaking and the mid-mountain chalet, Red Pine Lodge.

In 2018, High Meadow, a fixed grip quad servicing a learning area at Red Pine Lodge, was replaced with a high speed quad constructed by Doppelmayr. In 2019, an egress fixed grip quad known as Over and Out was installed to provide a direct return route from Tombstone and Iron Mountain back to the Canyons Village base area.

== Resort description ==
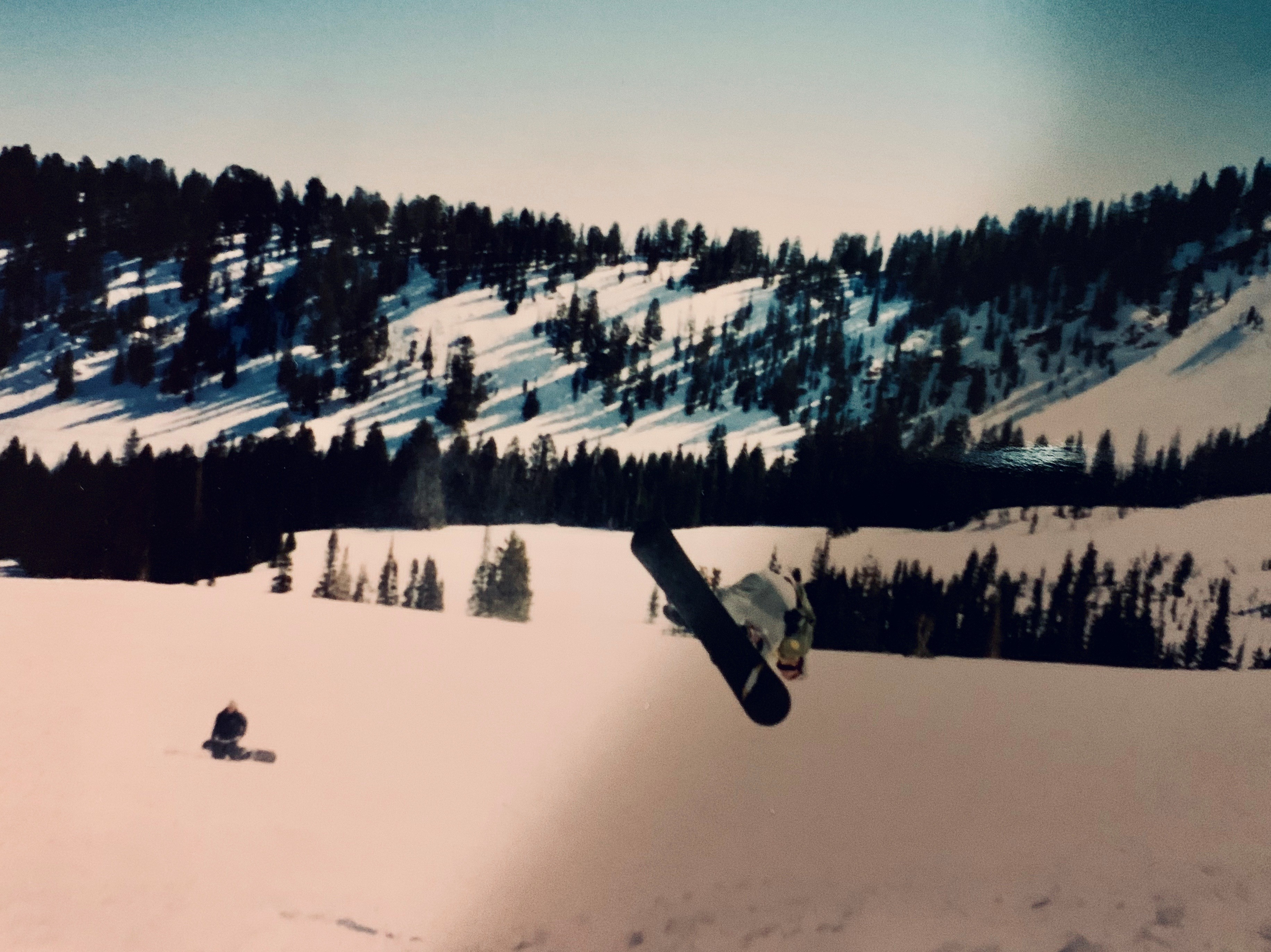
Professional snowboarder Matty Shaffer filming in the Canyons Resort backcountry over the gap off the 9990 lift.

Prior to its merger with Park City Mountain, Canyons Resort covered nine mountain peaks with maximum elevation of 9,990 feet (3,040 m) on Peak 9990. The terrain had 182 trails, five bowls, six natural halfpipes, and three terrain parks. Side-mountain and backcountry skiing on the surrounding National Forest land could be accessed through gates found on some of the peaks. In 2010, Canyons began hosting part of the Sprint Grand Prix of Skicross and Snowboardcross, which lasted several consecutive years.

In the summer, Canyons Resort had an extensive trail and lift system open for mountain biking or hiking. The resort also operated two zip lines and a miniature golf course.

As with most four-season resorts, Canyons Resort had dining, shopping, and lodging options. The village also hosts concerts throughout the year at its outdoor amphitheater.
