= Stefanie von Siebenthal =

Swiss snowboarder

Personal information
- Nickname: Steffi
- Nationality: Swiss
- Born: 8 November 1977 (age 48) Saanen, Switzerland

Sport
- Country: Switzerland
- Sport: Snowboarding

Stefanie von Siebenthal (born 8 November 1977) is a Swiss snowboarder.

Siebenthal was born in Saanen. She competed in the giant slalom at the 1998 Winter Olympics, as well as at the 2002 Winter Olympics.
