= Jan Michaelis =

German snowboarder

Personal information
- Nationality: German
- Born: 15 January 1978 (age 47); Hamburg, Germany

Sport
- Sport: Snowboarding

Jan Michaelis (born 15 January 1978) is a German snowboarder. He competed at the 2002 Winter Olympics and the 2006 Winter Olympics. He won the FIS Snowboard World Cup in the discipline halfpipe in the 2001/2002 and 2005/2006 season.
