= Íker Fernández =

Spanish snowboarder

Personal information
- Nationality: Spanish
- Born: 9 September 1977 (age 47); San Sebastián, Spain

Sport
- Sport: Snowboarding

Íker Fernández (born 9 September 1977) is a Spanish snowboarder. He competed at the 1998 Winter Olympics, the 2002 Winter Olympics and the 2006 Winter Olympics.
