= Therry Brunner =

Swiss snowboarder

Personal information
- Nationality: Swiss
- Born: 6 September 1975 (age 49); Dielsdorf, Switzerland

Sport
- Sport: Snowboarding

Therry Brunner (born 6 September 1975) is a Swiss former snowboarder. He competed at the 2002 Winter Olympics and the 2006 Winter Olympics.
