= FIS Snowboarding World Championships 2013 – Men's halfpipe =

The men's halfpipe competition of the 2013 FIS Snowboarding World Championships was held in Stoneham-et-Tewkesbury, Québec, Canada on January 19 & 20, 2013. 53 athletes from 20 countries competed.

== Medalists ==
Gold	Yuri Podladchikov; Switzerland (SUI)
Silver	Taku Hiraoka; Japan (JPN)
Bronze	Markus Malin; Finland (FIN)

== Results ==
=== Qualification ===
Rank	Bib	Name	Country	Run 1	Run 2	Best Score	Note
1	39	Yuri Podladchikov	Switzerland	89.66	14.66	89.66	QF
2	40	Christian Haller	Switzerland	81.33	87.66	87.66	QF
3	6	Nathan Johnstone	Australia	87.00	13.33	87.00	QF
4	28	Markus Malin	Finland	86.00	59.66	86.00	QF
5	1	Taku Hiraoka	Japan	82.66	82.00	82.66	QF
6	5	Janne Korpi	Finland	8.66	77.33	77.33	QF
7	31	Ryō Aono	Japan	45.00	83.66	83.66	QSF
8	16	Peetu Piiroinen	Finland	74.66	75.66	75.66	QSF
9	2	Kosuke Hosokawa	Japan	75.00	63.66	75.00	QSF
10	4	Dimi de Jong	Netherlands	70.66	74.33	74.33	QSF
11	8	Ilkka-Eemeli Laari	Finland	70.33	73.33	73.33	QSF
12	29	Scott James	Australia	66.33	72.33	72.33	QSF
13	33	Kent Callister	Australia	67.66	71.66	71.66	QSF
14	13	Spencer Shaw	United States	69.33	12.66	69.33	QSF
15	27	Brad Martin	Canada	69.00	14.66	69.00	QSF
16	37	Lars Bachmann	Switzerland	36.00	65.00	65.00	QSF
17	30	Shuhei Sato	Japan	11.66	64.66	64.66	QSF
18	43	Ben Kilner	Great Britain	64.33	59.33	64.33	QSF
19	19	Seamus O'Connor	Ireland	38.33	68.66	68.66	
20	12	Taylor Gold	United States	64.00	62.33	64.00	
21	48	Johann Baisamy	France	26.66	63.00	63.00	
22	35	Tim-Kevin Ravnjak	Slovenia	62.66	30.66	62.66	
23	21	Lee Kwang-Ki	South Korea	54.33	60.66	60.66	
23	34	Arthur Longo	France	60.66	58.66	60.66	
25	18	Shi Wancheng	China	60.33	41.00	60.33	
26	9	Jan Kralj	Slovenia	56.33	60.00	60.00	
27	14	Michal Ligocki	Poland	37.33	59.00	59.00	
28	20	Brett Esser	United States	58.33	58.66	58.66	
29	11	Kim Ho-Jun	South Korea	15.33	58.00	58.00	
30	17	Brennen Swanson	United States	19.66	57.66	57.66	
31	7	Steve Krijbolder	Netherlands	56.00	26.33	56.00	
32	41	Justin Lamoureux	Canada	53.66	55.33	55.33	
33	15	David Hablützel	Switzerland	54.66	14.66	54.66	
34	25	Filip Kavcic	Slovenia	22.66	53.66	53.66	
35	22	Kevin Bronckaers	Belgium	53.00	45.00	53.00	
36	47	Hu Yi	China	52.66	16.66	52.66	
37	10	Jan Necas	Czech Republic	52.33	16.66	52.33	
38	45	Sebbe de Buck	Belgium	50.00	40.66	50.00	
39	24	Xu Dechao	China	48.00	24.66	48.00	
39	49	Dominic Harington	Great Britain	48.00	23.00	48.00	
41	36	Manuel Pietropoli	Italy	12.00	47.33	47.33	
42	38	Ruben Verges	Spain	44.66	46.00	46.00	
43	23	Martin Mikyska	Czech Republic	43.33	17.33	43.33	
43	50	Park Sung-Jin	South Korea	26.33	43.33	43.33	
45	51	Dmitry Mindrul	Russia	42.33	20.00	42.33	
46	53	Kory Wright	Bahamas	41.66	26.66	41.66	
47	46	Sergey Tarasov	Russia	38.33	18.00	38.33	
48	32	Nikita Avtaneev	Russia	28.00	38.00	38.00	
49	42	Dolf van der Wal	Netherlands	29.00	16.66	29.00	
50	26	Woo Jae-Won	South Korea	18.66	18.66	18.66	
51	52	Derek Livingston	Canada	9.66	8.00	9.66	
52	44	Harrison Gray	Canada	7.66	DNS	7.66	
	3	Zhang Yiwei	China	DNS	DNS	DNS	

=== Semifinal ===
Rank	Bib	Name	Country	Run 1	Run 2	Best Score	Note
1	31	Ryō Aono	Japan	88.50	88.25	88.50	QF
2	29	Scott James	Australia	44.50	81.75	81.75	QF
3	16	Peetu Piiroinen	Finland	44.25	78.75	78.75	QF
4	8	Ilkka-Eemeli Laari	Finland	78.25	44.00	78.25	QF
5	13	Spencer Shaw	United States	25.50	76.00	76.00	QF
6	27	Brad Martin	Canada	72.50	51.00	72.50	QF
7	4	Dimi de Jong	Netherlands	72.00	72.25	72.25	
8	30	Shuhei Sato	Japan	66.25	56.00	66.25	
9	33	Kent Callister	Australia	60.25	65.00	65.00	
10	43	Ben Kilner	Great Britain	59.00	63.50	63.50	
11	2	Kosuke Hosokawa	Japan	6.50	60.50	60.50	
12	37	Lars Bachmann	Switzerland	52.50	14.75	52.50	

=== Final ===
Rank	Bib	Name	Country	Run 1	Run 2	Best Score	Note
1st place, gold medalist(s)	39	Yuri Podladchikov	Switzerland	64.50	94.25	94.25	
2nd place, silver medalist(s)	1	Taku Hiraoka	Japan	89.50	93.75	93.75	
3rd place, bronze medalist(s)	28	Markus Malin	Finland	75.25	86.75	86.75	
4	40	Christian Haller	Switzerland	83.25	85.75	85.75	
5	31	Ryō Aono	Japan	85.50	34.00	85.50	
6	29	Scott James	Australia	79.00	30.00	79.00	
7	6	Nathan Johnstone	Australia	22.25	76.75	76.75	
8	16	Peetu Piiroinen	Finland	75.00	71.25	75.00	
9	8	Ilkka-Eemeli Laari	Finland	17.75	61.25	61.25	
10	27	Brad Martin	Canada	46.50	59.50	59.50	
11	5	Janne Korpi	Finland	18.25	38.75	38.75	
12	13	Spencer Shaw	United States	19.00	21.50	21.50	
