= 2007–08 FIS Snowboard World Cup =

International snowboarding competition

Snowboard World Cup 2007/08
Discipline	Men	Women
Overall	(Austria) Benjamin Karl	(Netherlands) Nicolien Sauerbreij
Parallel slalom	(Austria) Benjamin Karl	(Netherlands) Nicolien Sauerbreij
Snowboard cross	(France) Pierre Vaultier	(Canada) Maëlle Ricker
Halfpipe	(Switzerland) Iouri Podladtchikov	(Switzerland) Manuela Pesko
Big Air	(Austria) Stefan Gimpl	

Competition
Locations	22 in 14 countries	17 in 11 countries
Individual	35	29

The 2007–08 FIS Snowboard World Cup is a multi race tournament over a season for snowboarding. The season began on 1 September 2007, and finished on 3 March 2008. The World Cup is organized by the FIS who also runs world cups and championships in cross-country skiing, ski jumping, Nordic combined, alpine skiing, and freestyle skiing.

== Men ==
=== Parallel Slalom ===
Date	Place	Winner	Second	Third
October 12, 2007	Landgraaf, Netherlands	Mathieu Bozzetto (FRA)	Siegfried Grabner (AUT)	Marc Iselin (SUI)
December 16, 2007	Nendaz, Switzerland	Mathieu Bozzetto (FRA)	Rok Flander (SLO)	Roland Haldi (SUI)
January 9, 2008	Bad Gastein, Austria	Mathieu Bozzetto (FRA)	Benjamin Karl (AUT)	Rok Margus (SLO)
January 20, 2008	La Molina, Spain	Rok Flander (SLO)	Benjamin Karl (AUT)	Andreas Prommegger (AUT)

=== Parallel Giant Slalom ===
Date	Place	Winner	Second	Third
October 20, 2007	Soelden, Austria	Rok Flander (SLO)	Daniel Biveson (SWE)	Adam Smith (USA)
December 8, 2007	Limone Piemonte, Italy	Manuel Veith (AUT)	Daniel Biveson (SWE)	Matthew Morison (CAN)
January 19, 2008	La Molina, Spain	Andreas Prommegger (AUT)	Anton Unterkofler (AUT)	Tyler Jewell (USA)
February 17, 2008	Sungwoo, South Korea	Benjamin Karl (AUT)	Roland Haldi (SUI)	Heinz Inniger (SUI)
February 24, 2008	Gujō, Gifu, Japan	Jasey-Jay Anderson (CAN)	Roland Fischnaller (ITA)	Matthew Morison (CAN)
March 3, 2008	Lake Placid, United States	Mathieu Bozzetto (FRA)	Tyler Jewell (USA)	Benjamin Karl (AUT)
March 8, 2008	Stoneham, Canada	Benjamin Karl (AUT)	Andreas Prommegger (AUT)	Matthew Morison (CAN)
March 15, 2008	Valmalenco, Italy	Matthew Morison (CAN)	Roland Fischnaller (ITA)	Justin Reiter (USA)

=== Snowboard Cross ===
Date	Place	Winner	Second	Third
September 26, 2007	Valle Nevado, Chile	Stian Sivertzen (NOR)	Robert Fagan (CAN)	Drew Neilson (CAN)
September 29, 2007	Valle Nevado, Chile	Pierre Vaultier (FRA)	Stian Sivertzen (NOR)	Xavier de Le Rue (FRA)
January 13, 2008	Bad Gastein, Austria	Mario Fuchs (AUT)	Shaun Palmer (USA)	Mateusz Ligocki (POL)
February 1, 2008	Leysin, Switzerland	Mario Fuchs (AUT)	David Speiser (GER)	Lukas Grüner (AUT)
February 15, 2008	Sungwoo, South Korea	Pierre Vaultier (FRA)	Nate Holland (USA)	Mateusz Ligocki (POL)
February 22, 2008	Gujō, Gifu, Japan	Graham Watanabe (USA)	Stian Sivertzen (NOR)	Alex Pullin (AUS)
March 1, 2008	Lake Placid, United States	Nick Baumgartner (USA)	Drew Neilson (CAN)	Tom Velisek (CAN)
March 7, 2008	Stoneham, Canada	Pierre Vaultier (FRA)	Paul-Henri de Le Rue (FRA)	Vincent Valery (FRA)
March 13, 2008	Valmalenco, Italy	Mateusz Ligocki (POL)	Pierre Vaultier (FRA)	Vincent Valery (FRA)

=== Halfpipe ===
Date	Place	Winner	Second	Third
September 1, 2007	Cardrona, New Zealand	Ryoh Aono (JPN)	Iouri Podladtchikov (SUI)	Rolf Feldmann (SUI)
November 2, 2007	Saas Fee, Switzerland	Iouri Podladtchikov (SUI)	Janne Korpi (FIN)	Christian Haller (SUI)
January 27, 2008	Bardonecchia, Italy	Manuel Pietropoli (ITA)	Markus Malin (FIN)	Peetu Piiroinen (FIN)
February 16, 2008	Sungwoo, South Korea	Ryoh Aono (JPN)	Greg Bretz (USA)	Iouri Podladtchikov (SUI)
February 23, 2008	Gujō, Gifu, Japan	Kazuumi Fujita (JPN)	Jeff Batchelor (CAN)	Greg Bretz (USA)
February 29, 2008	Calgary, Canada	Brad Martin (CAN)	Jeff Batchelor (CAN)	Tore-V. Holvik (NOR)
March 9, 2008	Stoneham, Canada	Greg Bretz (USA)	Brad Martin (CAN)	Nathan Johnstone (AUS)
March 16, 2008	Valmalenco, Italy	Crispin Lipscomb (CAN)	Iouri Podladtchikov (SUI)	James Hamilton (NZL)

=== Big Air ===
Date	Place	Winner	Second	Third
October 7, 2007	Rotterdam, Netherlands	Peetu Piiroinen (FIN)	Stefan Gimpl (AUT)	Antti Autti (FIN)
November 17, 2007	Stockholm, Sweden	Janne Korpi (FIN)	Risto Mattila (FIN)	Sami Saarenpaa (FIN)
December 22, 2007	Sofia, Bulgaria	Stefan Gimpl (AUT)	Janne Korpi (FIN)	Matevz Petek (SLO)
January 5, 2008	Graz, Austria	Stefan Gimpl (AUT)	Matti Kinnunen (FIN)	Petja Piiroinen (FIN)
February 9, 2008	Moscow, Russia	Stefan Gimpl (AUT)	Roope Tonteri (FIN)	Sindre Iversen (NOR)
March 14, 2008	Valmalenco, Italy	Kim-Rune Hansen (NOR)	Gjermund Braaten (NOR)	Stefan Gimpl (AUT)

== Women ==
=== Parallel Slalom ===
Date	Place	Winner	Second	Third
October 12, 2007	Landgraaf, Netherlands	Amelie Kober (GER)	Heidi Neururer (AUT)	Nicolien Sauerbreij (NED)
December 16, 2007	Nendaz, Switzerland	Julia Dujmovits (AUT)	Heidi Neururer (AUT)	Nicolien Sauerbreij (NED)
January 9, 2008	Bad Gastein, Austria	Nicolien Sauerbreij (NED)	Anke Karstens (GER)	Doris Günther (AUT)
January 20, 2008	La Molina, Spain	Heidi Neururer (AUT)	Nicolien Sauerbreij (NED)	Claudia Riegler (AUT)

=== Parallel Giant Slalom ===
Date	Place	Winner	Second	Third
October 21, 2007	Soelden, Austria	Marion Kreiner (AUT)	Heidi Neururer (AUT)	Nicolien Sauerbreij (NED)
December 8, 2007	Limone Piemonte, Italy	Heidi Neururer (AUT)	Ekaterina Tudigescheva (RUS)	Carmen Ranigler (ITA)
January 19, 2008	La Molina, Spain	Nicolien Sauerbreij (NED)	Claudia Riegler (AUT)	Marion Kreiner (AUT)
February 17, 2008	Sungwoo, South Korea	Doris Günther (AUT)	Nicolien Sauerbreij (NED)	Svetlana Boldikova (RUS)
February 24, 2008	Gujō, Gifu, Japan	Nicolien Sauerbreij (NED)	Julia Dujmovits (AUT)	Ekaterina Tudigescheva (RUS)
March 3, 2008	Lake Placid, United States	Svetlana Boldikova (RUS)	Fraenzi Maergert-Kohli (SUI)	Heidi Neururer (AUT)
March 8, 2008	Stoneham, Canada	Nicolien Sauerbreij (NED)	Ekaterina Tudigescheva (RUS)	Doris Günther (AUT)
March 15, 2008	Valmalenco, Italy	Anke Karstens (GER)	Michelle Gorgone (USA)	Claudia Riegler (AUT)

=== Snowboard Cross ===
Date	Place	Winner	Second	Third
September 26, 2007	Valle Nevado, Chile	Lindsey Jacobellis (USA)	Maëlle Ricker (CAN)	Doresia Krings (AUT)
September 29, 2007	Valle Nevado, Chile	Maëlle Ricker (CAN)	Mellie Francon (SUI)	Dominique Maltais (CAN)
January 13, 2008	Bad Gastein, Austria	Lindsey Jacobellis (USA)	Mellie Francon (SUI)	Tanja Frieden (SUI)
February 1, 2008	Leysin, Switzerland	Helene Olafsen (NOR)	Diane Thermoz Liaudy (FRA)	Tanja Frieden (SUI)
February 15, 2008	Sungwoo, South Korea	Maëlle Ricker (CAN)	Lindsey Jacobellis (USA)	Mellie Francon (SUI)
February 22, 2008	Gujō, Gifu, Japan	Maëlle Ricker (CAN)	Zoe Gillings (GBR)	Mellie Francon (SUI)
March 1, 2008	Lake Placid, United States	Lindsey Jacobellis (USA)	Maëlle Ricker (CAN)	Dominique Maltais (CAN)
March 7, 2008	Stoneham, Canada	Lindsey Jacobellis (USA)	Maëlle Ricker (CAN)	Mellie Francon (SUI)
March 13, 2008	Valmalenco, Italy	Sandra Frei (SUI)	Aleksandra Zhekova (BUL)	Dominique Maltais (CAN)

=== Halfpipe ===
Date	Place	Winner	Second	Third
September 1, 2007	Cardrona, New Zealand	Manuela Pesko (SUI)	Lindsey Jacobellis (USA)	Clair Bidez (USA)
November 2, 2007	Saas Fee, Switzerland	Kjersti Buaas (NOR)	Xu Chen (CHN)	Manuela Pesko (SUI)
January 27, 2008	Bardonecchia, Italy	Anne Sophie Pellissier (FRA)	Queralt Castellet (ESP)	Sophie Rodriguez (FRA)
February 16, 2008	Sungwoo, South Korea	Liu Jiayu (CHN)	Soko Yamaoka (JPN)	Lindsey Jacobellis (USA)
February 23, 2008	Gujō, Gifu, Japan	Zhifeng Sun (CHN)	Soko Yamaoka (JPN)	Manuela Pesko (SUI)
February 29, 2008	Calgary, Canada	Liu Jiayu (CHN)	Xu Chen (CHN)	Sophie Rodriguez (FRA)
March 9, 2008	Stoneham, Canada	Manuela Pesko (SUI)	Sarah Conrad (CAN)	Queralt Castellet (ESP)
March 16, 2008	Valmalenco, Italy	Manuela Pesko (SUI)	Queralt Castellet (ESP)	Zhifeng Sun (CHN)

== Standings ==
=== Men ===
==== Overall ====
Pos.		Points
1.	(Austria) Benjamin Karl	6290
2.	(France) Mathieu Bozzetto	6100
3.	(France) Pierre Vaultier	5180
4.	(Austria) Andreas Prommegger	4960
5.	(Austria) Stefan Gimpl	4640
6.	(Canada) Matthew Morison	4490
7.	(Finland) Janne Korpi	4220
8.	(Norway) Stian Sivertzen	4180
9.	(Canada) Jasey-Jay Anderson	4046
10.	(Slovenia) Rok Flander	3918

==== Parallel slalom ====
Pos.		Points
1.	(Austria) Benjamin Karl	6290
2.	(France) Mathieu Bozzetto	6100
3.	(Austria) Andreas Prommegger	4960
4.	(Canada) Matthew Morison	4490
5.	(Slovenia) Rok Flander	3918

==== Snowboardcross ====
Pos.		Points
1.	(France) Pierre Vaultier	5180
2.	(Norway) Stian Sivertzen	4180
3.	(Austria) Mario Fuchs	3440
4.	(United States) Graham Watanabe	2990
5.	(Canada) Drew Neilson	2728

==== Halfpipe ====
Pos.		Points
1.	(Switzerland) Iouri Podladtchikov	3700
2.	(United States) Greg Bretz	2620
3.	(Canada) Jeff Batchelor	2250
4.	(Switzerland) Sergio Berger	2170
5.	(Canada) Brad Martin	2040

==== Big Air ====
Pos.		Points
1.	(Austria) Stefan Gimpl	4640
2.	(Finland) Janne Korpi	2200
3.	(Slovenia) Matevz Petek	1980
4.	(Finland) Petja Piiroinen	1402
4.	(Norway) Kim-Rune Hansen	1399

=== Women ===
==== Overall ====
Pos.		Points
1.	(Netherlands) Nicolien Sauerbreij	8260
2.	(United States) Lindsey Jacobellis	7420
3.	(Austria) Heidi Neururer	6560
4.	(Austria) Doris Günther	6550
5.	(Canada) Maëlle Ricker	6090
6.	(Austria) Doresia Krings	5740
7.	(Switzerland) Mellie Francon	4710
8.	(Switzerland) Manuela Pesko	4700
9.	(Austria) Claudia Riegler	4610
10.	(Norway) Helene Olafsen	4160

==== Parallel slalom ====
Pos.		Points
1.	(Netherlands) Nicolien Sauerbreij	8260
2.	(Austria) Heidi Neururer	6560
3.	(Austria) Claudia Riegler	4610
4.	(Austria) Doris Günther	4520
5.	(Russia) Svetlana Boldikova	4110

==== Snowboardcross ====
Pos.		Points
1.	(Canada) Maëlle Ricker	6090
2.	(United States) Lindsey Jacobellis	5700
3.	(Switzerland) Mellie Francon	4710
4.	(Canada) Dominique Maltais	3840
5.	(Norway) Helene Olafsen	3570

==== Halfpipe ====
Pos.		Points
1.	(Switzerland) Manuela Pesko	4700
2.	(China) Liu Jiayu	3950
3.	(Spain) Queralt Castellet	2970
4.	(China) Xu Chen	2630
5.	(China) Sun Zhifeng	2570

== Podium table by nation ==
Rank	Nation	Gold	Silver	Bronze	Total
1	Austria	14	11	11	36
2	France	8	3	5	16
3	Canada	7	9	8	24
4	United States	7	7	6	20
5	Switzerland	5	6	13	24
6	Norway	4	3	2	9
7	Netherlands	4	2	3	9
8	China	3	2	1	6
9	Japan	3	2	0	5
10	Finland	2	6	4	12
11	Germany	2	2	0	4
12	Slovenia	2	1	2	5
13	Russia	1	2	2	5
14	Italy	1	2	1	4
15	Poland	1	0	2	3
16	Spain	0	2	1	3
17	Sweden	0	2	0	2
18	Bulgaria	0	1	0	1
18	Great Britain	0	1	0	1
20	Australia	0	0	2	2
21	New Zealand	0	0	1	1
Totals (21 entries)		64	64	64	192
