= FIS Snowboarding World Championships 2011 – Men's halfpipe =

The men's halfpipe competition of the FIS Snowboarding World Championships 2011 was held at Alabaus in La Molina, Spain between January 19 and 20, 2011. 55 athletes from 18 countries competed. The qualification round was completed on January 19, while the final was completed on January 20.

== Results ==
=== Qualification ===
Heat 1

| Rank | Bib | Name | Country | Run 1 | Run 2 | Best | Notes |
|---|---|---|---|---|---|---|---|
| 1 | 3 | Ryo Aono | Japan | 25.6 | 26.3 | 26.3 | QF |
| 2 | 9 | Nathan Johnstone | Australia | 25.7 | 24.1 | 25.7 | QF |
| 3 | 4 | Iouri Podladtchikov | Switzerland | 22.8 | 24.6 | 24.6 | QSF |
| 4 | 1 | Taku Hiraoka | Japan | 21.2 | 21.5 | 21.5 | QSF |
| 5 | 10 | Kosuke Hosokawa | Japan | 12.0 | 21.2 | 21.2 | QSF |
| 6 | 8 | Mitchell Brown | New Zealand | 21.0 | 10.5 | 21.0 | QSF |
| 7 | 6 | Aluan Ricciardi | France | 19.6 | 20.5 | 20.5 | |
| 8 | 5 | Arthur Longo | France | 18.7 | 17.9 | 17.9 | |
| 9 | 11 | Derek Livingston | Canada | 17.2 | 13.7 | 17.2 | |
| 10 | 15 | Shi Wancheng | China | 16.2 | 4.3 | 16.2 | |
| 11 | 12 | Filip Kavcic | Slovenia | 12.8 | 15.3 | 15.3 | |
| 12 | 13 | Taylor Gold | United States | 9.7 | 10.3 | 10.3 | |
| 13 | 18 | Jan Kralj | Slovenia | 9.9 | 8.9 | 9.9 | |
| 14 | 16 | Lee Kwang-Ki | South Korea | 5.2 | 9.7 | 9.7 | |
| 15 | 14 | Clemens Schattschneider | Austria | 9.0 | 6.3 | 9.0 | |
| 16 | 19 | Petr Horak | Czech Republic | 4.4 | 8.0 | 8.0 | |
| 17 | 7 | Sergey Tarasov | Russia | 6.0 | 3.4 | 6.0 | |
| 18 | 17 | Bjorn Simons | Belgium | 2.6 | 5.3 | 5.3 | |
| | 2 | Peetu Piiroinen | Finland | | | | DNS |

Heat 2

| Rank | Bib | Name | Country | Run 1 | Run 2 | Best | Notes |
|---|---|---|---|---|---|---|---|
| 1 | 24 | Mathieu Crepel | France | 24.7 | 26.2 | 26.2 | QF |
| 2 | 26 | Christian Haller | Switzerland | 23.9 | 25.6 | 25.6 | QF |
| 3 | 20 | Antti Autti | Finland | 11.5 | 23.2 | 23.2 | QSF |
| 4 | 21 | Brad Martin | Canada | 23.0 | 21.9 | 23.0 | QSF |
| 5 | 28 | Markus Malin | Finland | 22.8 | 21.9 | 22.8 | QSF |
| 6 | 25 | Justin Lamoreux | Canada | 21.6 | 3.0 | 21.6 | QSF |
| 7 | 27 | Isaac Verges | Spain | 19.9 | 19.6 | 19.9 | |
| 8 | 33 | Giorgio Ciancaleoni | Italy | 19.2 | 10.3 | 19.2 | |
| 9 | 22 | Manuel Pietropoli | Italy | 18.7 | 10.6 | 18.7 | |
| 10 | 32 | Tim Kevin Ravnjak | Slovenia | 16.0 | 18.4 | 18.4 | |
| 11 | 29 | Ruben Verges | Spain | 17.9 | 1.6 | 17.9 | |
| 12 | 30 | Jan Nekas | Czech Republic | 9.0 | 15.8 | 15.8 | |
| 13 | 31 | Paul Brichta | United States | 10.1 | 13.0 | 13.0 | |
| 14 | 35 | Rocco van Straten | Netherlands | 12.5 | 10.7 | 12.5 | |
| 15 | 37 | Lorenzo Buzzoni | Italy | 11.0 | 5.9 | 11.0 | |
| 16 | 34 | Steve Krivbolder | Netherlands | 3.0 | 10.2 | 10.2 | |
| 17 | 23 | Dimi De Jong | Netherlands | 5.0 | 5.4 | 5.4 | |
| | 36 | Regino Hernandez | Spain | | | | DNS |

Heat 3

| Rank | Bib | Name | Country | Run 1 | Run 2 | Best | Notes |
|---|---|---|---|---|---|---|---|
| 1 | 43 | Patrick Burgener | Switzerland | 24.0 | 26.3 | 26.3 | QF |
| 2 | 42 | Ilkka-Eemeli Laari | Finland | 14.7 | 25.7 | 25.7 | QF |
| 3 | 47 | Benjamin Farrow | United States | 23.6 | 22.3 | 23.6 | QSF |
| 4 | 45 | Dolf van der Wal | Netherlands | 21.8 | 6.8 | 21.8 | QSF |
| 5 | 39 | Johann Baisamy | France | 21.2 | 21.4 | 21.4 | QSF |
| 6 | 48 | Ben Stewart | New Zealand | 21.2 | 9.3 | 21.2 | QSF |
| 7 | 41 | Kim Ho-Jun | South Korea | 21.0 | 20.1 | 21.0 | |
| 8 | 40 | Seppe Smits | Belgium | 18.0 | 7.2 | 18.0 | |
| 9 | 38 | Michal Ligocki | Poland | 10.7 | 17.9 | 17.9 | |
| 10 | 49 | James Hamilton | New Zealand | 17.0 | 17.7 | 17.7 | |
| 11 | 53 | Huang Shiying | China | 17.5 | 14.9 | 17.5 | |
| 12 | 46 | Jan Scherrer | Switzerland | 15.0 | 8.8 | 15.0 | |
| 13 | 51 | Nikolay Bilanin | Russia | 14.3 | 9.5 | 14.3 | |
| 14 | 54 | Xu Dechao | China | 4.2 | 13.4 | 13.4 | |
| 15 | 44 | Zhang Yiwei | China | 12.9 | 3.3 | 12.9 | |
| 16 | 50 | Oriol Fargas | Spain | 12.6 | 3.0 | 12.6 | |
| 17 | 55 | Filberto Piller Cotrer | Italy | 3.7 | 8.4 | 8.4 | |
| 18 | 52 | Dmitriy Mindrul | Russia | 7.5 | 7.3 | 7.5 | |

=== Semifinal ===
| Rank | Bib | Name | Country | Run 1 | Run 2 | Best | Notes |
|---|---|---|---|---|---|---|---|
| 1 | 28 | Markus Malin | Finland | 25.7 | 12.8 | 25.7 | Q |
| 2 | 4 | Iouri Podladtchikov | Switzerland | 24.6 | 20.7 | 24.6 | Q |
| 3 | 1 | Taku Hiraoka | Japan | 24.1 | 23.2 | 24.1 | Q |
| 4 | 21 | Brad Martin | Canada | 22.8 | 1.8 | 22.8 | Q |
| 5 | 20 | Antti Autti | Finland | 18.0 | 22.6 | 22.6 | Q |
| 6 | 47 | Benjamin Farrow | United States | 22.4 | 8.2 | 22.4 | Q |
| 7 | 8 | Mitchell Brown | New Zealand | 22.0 | 4.5 | 22.0 | |
| 8 | 10 | Kosuke Hosokawa | Japan | 20.3 | 21.8 | 21.8 | |
| 9 | 39 | Johann Baisamy | France | 20.1 | 8.0 | 20.1 | |
| 10 | 45 | Dolf van der Wal | Netherlands | 19.1 | 12.5 | 19.1 | |
| 11 | 48 | Ben Stewart | New Zealand | 18.2 | 18.9 | 18.9 | |
| 12 | 25 | Justin Lamoreux | Canada | 17.8 | 17.4 | 17.8 | |

=== Final ===
| Rank | Bib | Name | Country | Run 1 | Run 2 | Best | Notes |
|---|---|---|---|---|---|---|---|
| 1st place, gold medalist(s) | 9 | Nathan Johnstone | Australia | 26.8 | 14.5 | 26.8 | |
| 2nd place, silver medalist(s) | 4 | Iouri Podladtchikov | Switzerland | 26.2 | 8.5 | 26.2 | |
| 3rd place, bronze medalist(s) | 28 | Markus Malin | Finland | 22.4 | 24.3 | 24.3 | |
| 4 | 26 | Christian Haller | Switzerland | 23.9 | 6.1 | 23.9 | |
| 5 | 42 | Ilkka-Eemeli Laari | Finland | 23.7 | 21.8 | 23.7 | |
| 6 | 43 | Patrick Burgener | Switzerland | 22.8 | 6.7 | 22.8 | |
| 7 | 24 | Mathieu Crepel | France | 20.9 | 22.2 | 22.2 | |
| 8 | 3 | Ryo Aono | Japan | 21.4 | 10.7 | 21.4 | |
| 9 | 1 | Taku Hiraoka | Japan | 11.5 | 20.3 | 20.3 | |
| 10 | 20 | Antti Autti | Finland | 13.5 | 19.9 | 19.9 | |
| 11 | 21 | Brad Martin | Canada | 19.6 | 9.5 | 19.6 | |
| 12 | 47 | Benjamin Farrow | United States | 7.7 | 19.1 | 19.1 | |
