= 2012 World Snowboarding Championships =

Snowboarding competition

The 2012 World Snowboard Championships (WSC) took place in Oslo, Norway from February 10–19, 2012. 240 riders from approximately 35 countries competed in slopestyle and halfpipe disciplines.

The 2012 World Snowboarding Championships is the first championships run by snowboarders since 1999. It is developed and owned by the Ticket To Ride (TTR) and World Snowboard Federation (WSF). It is organized by Snowboard-VM 2012 AS – the local organizing company owned by The Arctic Challenge, The Norwegian Snowboard Federation and Oslo Vinterpark. The WSC got a full backing by the global snowboard community as expressed by the unanimous vote at the TTR and WSF general assemblies in Barcelona, May 2010.

== Results ==
=== Medal count ===
Rank	Nation	Gold	Silver	Bronze	Total
1	United States (USA)	2	2	2	6
2	Canada (CAN)	1	1	0	2
3	Switzerland (SUI)	1	0	0	1
4	Spain (ESP)	0	1	0	1
5	Belgium (BEL)	0	0	1	1
5	Finland (FIN)	0	0	1	1
Totals (6 entries)		4	4	4	12

=== Men ===
==== Men's Slopestyle results ====
Rank	Name	Run 1	Run 2	Run 3	Score
Gold medal	Chas Guldemond (USA)	79.3	27.3	87.9	87.9
Silver medal	Sebastien Toutant (CAN)	32.1	86.8	33.2	86.8
Bronze medal	Seppe Smits (BEL)	76.3	21.3	52.7	76.3
4	Eric Beauchemin (USA)	73.0	75.9	48.2	75.9
5	Aleksander Østreng (NOR)	49.2	21.4	74.4	74.4
6	Sven Thorgren (SWE)	54.1	46.3	66.7	66.7
7	Tyler Flanagan (USA)	63.1	30.4	20.1	63.1
8	Roope Tonteri (FIN)	43.3	55.5	59.5	59.5
9	Mark McMorris (CAN)	36.9	32.6	26.2	36.9
DNS	Eric Willett (USA)				

==== Men's Halfpipe results ====
Rank	Name	Run 1	Run 2	Run 3	Score
Gold medal	Iouri Podladtchikov (SUI)	90.8	89.6	23.3	90.8
Silver medal	Matt Ladley (USA)	48.5	87.6	36.8	87.6
Bronze medal	Louie Vito (USA)	59.1	86.9	22.6	86.9
4	Taku Hiraoka (JPN)	86.3	44.00	45.2	86.3
5	Nathan Johnstone (AUS)	84.8	46.9	85.8	85.8
6	Christian Haller (SUI)	44.0	82.4	45.0	82.4
7	Ryo Aono (JPN)	58.3	69.7	80.3	80.3
8	Benji Farrow (USA)	76.9	51.2	77.0	77.0
9	Markus Malin (FIN)	35.9	75.0	55.2	75.0
10	Peetu Piiroinen (FIN)	31.3	39.2	38.6	39.2

=== Women ===
==== Women's Slopestyle results ====
Rank	Name	Run 1	Run 2	Run 3	Score
Gold medal	Spencer O'Brien (CAN)	40.3	31.3	84.4	84.4
Silver medal	Jamie Anderson (USA)	78.9	43.3	39.6	78.9
Bronze medal	Enni Rukajärvi (FIN)	71.9	43.3	74.5	74.5

==== Women's Halfpipe results ====
Rank	Name	Run 1	Run 2	Run 3	Score
Gold medal	Kelly Clark (USA)	84.2	32.5	86.6	86.6
Silver medal	Queralt Castellet (ESP)	81.1	51.2	85.6	85.6
Bronze medal	Gretchen Bleiler (USA)	78.3	77.2	82.9	82.9
