= Gwen Reed =

Actress and educational advocate

Gwendolyn B. Reed
- Born: 1912; Harlem, New York
- Died: 1974
- Occupation: Actress

Gwen Reed (1912-1974) was an actress and educational advocate from Hartford, Connecticut. She was an African-American person.

== Biography ==
=== Early life ===
Gwendolyn B. Clarke was born in Harlem, New York, in 1912, to Georgianna and George Nathanial Clarke. Clarke's parents separated while she was still a child, and she moved with her mother to Hartford, Connecticut. Clarke worked with her mother in Connecticut tobacco fields.

Clarke graduated from Hartford Public High School and then briefly studied law at Hartford Federal College. In 1935, she married John T. Reed. After four years, they separated, and in 1948, they divorced.

=== Career ===
In 1936, Reed began work as a secretary for the Charles Gilpin Players. The Players performed as part of the "Negro Unit" of the Connecticut Federal Theatre Project. The group was named after the Black actor Charles Gilpin, who created the leading role in Eugene O'Neill's The Emperor Jones. The next year, Reed received her first theatrical role, a small role in the Gilpin Players' production of Trilogy in Black. Reed went on to act in more productions, such as The World We Live In, Mississippi Rainbow, and The Emperor Jones. A reviewer described Reed's February 1938 performance as May in The Field God as "by far the best player."

From 1946 to 1964, Reed took on the role of the fictional spokesperson Aunt Jemima, representing Quaker Oats Company products. She traveled to festivals, grocery stores, and state fairs, promoting the brands. Her real name was never given in newspaper clippings of her appearances.

Reed also continued to appear in community theater productions, including the Mark Twain Masquers, Cue and Curtain, Glastonbury Players, Center Playhouse, Image Playhouse, Triangle Players, and The Oval.

In 1951, Reed became the director of the Hartford Community Players. For the next 16 years, the troupe put on many productions, including A Raisin in the Sun, Rain, and Purlie Victorious. Reed won the Herald Award for best supporting actress in Purlie Victorious.

=== Educational advocacy ===
Reed was active in educational and community work. She read stories to children at the Children's Corner of the Hartford Public Library, which later became a local television segment on Channel 3, "Story Time with Gwen Reed." Reed was an active member of the Head Start and Reading is Fundamental programs. She also started the Playtime for Tots program to help preschool children in her Hartford Bellevue Square housing complex.

=== Legacy ===
After Reed's death in 1974, Hartford mayor George Athanson dedicated the story room the Gwen Reed Room at the Hartford Public Library in her honor. A star on the library's patio honors Reed's contributions to Hartford. The Hartford Public Library holds the Papers of Gwen Reed.

The theater group HartBeat Ensemble was given $15,000 in 2021 by the New England Foundation of the Arts to create a new play about Reed.
