= FIS Freestyle Ski and Snowboarding World Championships 2017 – Men's snowboard halfpipe =

The men's snowboard halfpipe competition of the FIS Freestyle Ski and Snowboarding World Championships 2017 was held at Sierra Nevada, Spain on March 10 (qualifying) and March 11 (finals). 34 athletes from 14 countries competed.

== Qualification ==
The following are the results of the qualification.

Rank	Bib	Name	Country	Run 1	Run 2	Notes
1	1	Scotty James	Australia	80.25	92.25	Q
2	5	Zhang Yiwei	China	90.00	25.50	Q
3	10	Taku Hiraoka	Japan	81.75	87.25	Q
4	4	Louie Vito	United States	84.75	36.25	Q
5	3	Patrick Burgener	Switzerland	3.75	82.50	Q
6	7	Jan Scherrer	Switzerland	75.50	82.25	Q
7	2	Iouri Podladtchikov	Switzerland	81.00	32.00	Q
8	11	David Hablützel	Switzerland	60.50	79.50	Q
9	12	Markus Malin	Finland	76.50	14.25	Q
10	6	Ryan Wachendorfer	United States	76.00	31.25	Q
11	8	Kent Callister	Australia	72.75	16.25	
12	16	Nikita Avtaneev	Russia	5.25	71.75	
13	21	Chase Blackwell	United States	60.25	70.25	
14	18	Nathan Johnstone	Australia	68.50	3.50	
15	15	Rakal Tait	New Zealand	59.75	57.25	
16	17	Toby Miller	United States	24.00	52.50	
17	28	Lee Min-sik	South Korea	52.00	29.50	
18	14	Kweon Lee-jun	South Korea	50.25	37.25	
19	20	Tit Stante	Slovenia	45.00	24.25	
19	27	Shi Wancheng	China	3.75	45.00	
21	29	Filip Kavčič	Slovenia	44.50	21.00	
22	25	Janne Korpi	Finland	40.00	33.00	
22	34	Jan Nečas	Czech Republic	17.25	40.00	
24	30	Maksim Suikov	Russia	4.25	39.75	
25	32	Mikoláš Pajer	Czech Republic	36.00	14.00	
26	24	Derek Livingston	Canada	23.50	26.50	
27	26	Kim Ho-jun	South Korea	8.50	22.50	
28	9	Lee Kwang-ki	South Korea	20.00	7.50	
29	22	Trevor Niblett	Canada	6.75	19.25	
30	31	Huang Shiying	China	10.25	17.00	
31	19	Tim-Kevin Ravnjak	Slovenia	15.75	5.75	
32	13	Andre Hoeflich	Germany	10.00	4.25	
33	23	Freeman Andrews	New Zealand	1.25	DNS	
	33	Botond Istvan Fricz	Hungary	DNS	DNS	

== Final ==
The following are the results of the finals.

Rank	Bib	Name	Country	Run 1	Run 2	Run 3	Best
1st place, gold medalist(s)	1	Scotty James	Australia	95.75	97.50	5.25	97.50
2nd place, silver medalist(s)	2	Iouri Podladtchikov	Switzerland	89.75	93.25	68.50	93.25
3rd place, bronze medalist(s)	3	Patrick Burgener	Switzerland	41.50	87.50	90.50	90.50
4	10	Taku Hiraoka	Japan	40.25	73.50	90.00	90.00
5	5	Zhang Yiwei	China	27.25	85.00	39.00	85.00
6	12	Markus Malin	Finland	82.00	19.00	15.00	82.00
7	11	David Hablützel	Switzerland	29.25	79.50	62.00	79.50
8	4	Louie Vito	United States	74.00	78.75	39.25	78.75
9	6	Ryan Wachendorfer	United States	19.75	57.50	46.75	57.50
10	7	Jan Scherrer	Switzerland	8.75	41.75	26.75	41.75
