= Aleksander Østreng =

Norwegian snowboarder (born 1991)

Personal information
- Born: 5 April 1991 (age 35)

Sport
- Sport: Snowboarding
- Club: BSK Snowboard

Aleksander "Alek" Østreng (born 5 April 1991) is a Norwegian snowboarder. He grew up in Bærum.

He participated at the 2012 World Snowboarding Championships, where he placed 5th in slopestyle. He competed at the Winter X Games XX in Aspen, Colorado, where he placed 5th in slopestyle.
