= Caroline Hewins =

American librarian

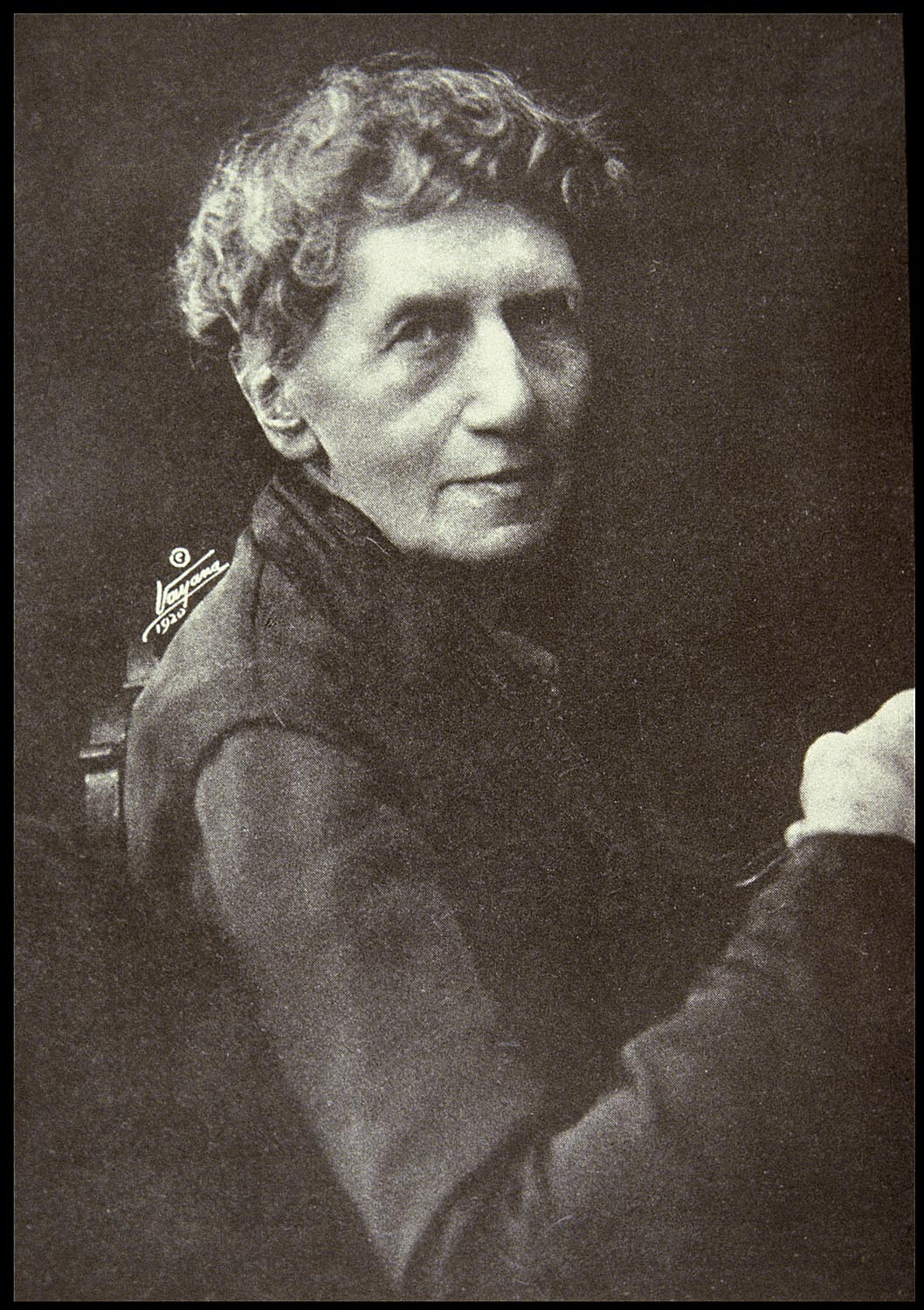
- Born: October 10, 1846; Roxbury
- Died: November 4, 1926 (aged 80)
- Alma mater: Trinity College
- Occupation: Librarian
- Employer: Hartford Public Library
- Awards: Connecticut Women's Hall of Fame (1995); Library Hall of Fame

Caroline Maria Hewins (October 10, 1846 – November 4, 1926) was an American librarian.

American Libraries includes Caroline Hewins as one of the 100 Most Important Leaders we had in the 20th Century for her work as a librarian, where she is noted for her contributions to children's library services. She was a librarian at the Hartford Young Men's Institute, which is now known as the Hartford Public Library in Hartford, Connecticut for more than fifty years. An author as well as librarian, she contributed not only to the expansion of children's library services across the U.S., but also the expansion of her library's membership, as well as its transformation from a subscription library to a free public library.

== Early life ==
Caroline Hewins was born in Roxbury, Massachusetts on October 10, 1846. In the autobiographical book, A Mid-Century Child and Her Books, Hewins writes that after a bit of moving around, her family settled in West Roxbury when she was about seven years old. She was the oldest of nine children. Her father was a wealthy Boston merchant who provided a comfortable home for his wife, children, and an extended family of aunts, uncles, and grandmothers. Caroline learned to read by the age of four. Her love for books increased as she read to her younger siblings and as she progressed to reading folk and fairy tales, the English classics, and the stories from Greek, Roman, and European literary traditions.

== Education ==
Caroline Hewin's childhood education consisted of private schooling, before attending Eliot High School. After receiving her high school diploma, she attended the Girls’ High and Normal School where she graduated, although at first she described having some difficulty adjusting to her new educational environment. After graduation, she was hired to do Civil War research at the Boston Athenaeum. This is where she received her brief library training, learning sound bibliographic practice while working for one year under William Frederick Poole. She briefly describes that during this time she learned about the inner-workings of the library and how it was managed and funded. In 1911, Hewins was awarded an honorary master of arts degree from Hartford's Trinity College in recognition of her 51 years of service at the library. She was the first woman so honored by the college.

== Career ==
Caroline Hewins left the Boston Athenaeum to take a job as librarian at the Young Men's Institute of Hartford where she was employed from 1875 until her death in 1926. When she was hired at age 29, the Young Men's Institute was a subscription library with 600 members. It was a private association dedicated to informal learning, lectures, and debates. Hewins shepherded the library through a number of important changes. In 1878, the Young Men's Institute was merged with the Hartford Library Association and, ten years later, a generous grant enabled the library to undertake a large expansion project. In 1892, Hewins oversaw the library's change from a private, subscription service to a free public library, and the Hartford Public Library was born. Suddenly the library went from its 600 paying members to thousands of patrons with free access. In order to better serve the community, Hewins expanded the library's hours to include Sunday afternoons so that working people could take advantage of the institution's resources. In 1895 she opened the first branch library in the North Street Settlement House where she lived, staffing it herself one hour each evening. Her commitment to the success of the branch and her appreciation of the work going on there was so strong that she moved in and resided there for twelve years.

== Contributions to the field of library science ==
=== Contributions to children's library services ===
Caroline Hewins is most often credited for her contributions to children's library services. Hewins's programs for children, along with her scholarly articles and lists of recommended children's books, influenced generations of children's librarians as well as publishers of children's books and bookstores. Before her time, library services to children barely existed. Children younger than 12 years old were often not allowed to patron libraries when she began her career as a librarian. Despite this, one of her most significant accomplishments was her success in adding a children's room in 1904 before the end of her career at the Hartford Public Library. The idea of having a children's room at a library was very influential. Soon after, other libraries followed her example and began the addition of children's rooms. She also hired the library's first dedicated children's librarian in 1907.

==== Advocate for children ====
Soon after accepting the librarian position at the Hartford Young Men's Institute in 1876, she began inviting children to the library. The Institute Library had not welcomed children, but Hewins quickly changed that, and gathered together books by Grimm, Andersen, Hawthorne, Thackeray and Dickens to furnish a corner for them. Three years after arriving at the Young Men's Institute of Hartford, she began to include reading lists for children in the libraries news bulletin. Opinionated, iconoclastic and not a follower of rules established by others, she believed that children deserved better books than the formulaic and often violent Horatio Alger stories and weekly novels of the penny press. The Children's Room she established had furniture suitable for different ages of children, pictures of flowers, much light and a resident dog the children helped name. She used the power of the local press and professional library periodicals to encourage parents to bring their children to libraries, to read with them, and to choose quality books that would inspire the young imagination.

Hewins also fought against "literary prudery." In a 1905 controversy over the books The Adventures of Huckleberry Finn and The Adventures of Tom Sawyer the Brooklyn Public Library banned both works from the children's section. They were widely criticized for this action in newspapers across the country. As chief librarian at Hartford Public, Hewins refused to ban them from the newly opened children's library.

==== Linking libraries and schools ====
Hewins was far ahead of her time in regards to building connections between the library and local schools. She partnered with local schools, often serving them tea at her house, so that children would have better access to library resources. Hewins also founded an Education Club for parents and teachers, which would later come to be known as the Parent-Teacher Association. She collected books to be used in city classrooms, and made the library a place for book groups, theatrical skits, exhibits and parties. She extended the services of the Institute to local schools by persuading them to find the means to pay the yearly fee for membership, that way the schools could have books from the library brought to them, allowing students to take advantage of the library right from the classroom. During the time when a paid subscription to the library was $3 per year to borrow one book at a time, Hewins worked with local Hartford schools to provide subscription cards for the children, at pennies per card. By the time the library became a free service in 1892, Miss Hewins had already lowered the annual subscription fee to $1 and doubled the membership.

==== Writing for children ====
Hewins was an avid writer and in 1882, she published “Books for the Young”, an influential guide and list of recommended books for libraries to have available for children. This was the first bibliography intended for children and it has been used by many librarians and booksellers. The book was so influential that it was picked up and revised by the American Library Association for later use. Six years later her article in the January 1888 Atlantic Monthly on the history of children's books elevated the subject to the status of children's literature, worthy of scholarly attention. Hewins was always thinking of ways to reach children and so when she traveled, particularly abroad, she wrote extensive letters to the library's young patrons. These letters were gathered and published in 1923 as A Traveler's Letters to Boys and Girls.

=== American Library Association affiliation ===
When the American Library Association (ALA) was founded in 1876, Caroline joined, becoming one of the early members. She was the first woman to give an address at its annual conference. She also helped found the ALA's Children's Section in 1900. In 1882, through the ALA, Hewins sent a questionnaire to twenty-five libraries around the country and asked: “What are you doing to encourage a love of reading in boys and girls?” Based on the discouraging answers, which revealed that little was being done to encourage early readership, she made an impassioned report to the ALA that galvanized their attention. Within a few years, the ALA had established a Children's Section so that members could exchange ideas on how to best serve young readers and it was supporting professional training schools for children's librarians.

=== Connecticut state library committee ===
In 1891 Caroline founded the first Connecticut State Library Committee (precursor of the state library commission), becoming its executive secretary. Hewins writes that among her duties as secretary of the library committee, she would oversee the operations of the West Roxbury library in the absence of the regular librarian. Hewins would also drive her horse and buggy throughout the state to encourage cooperation between schools and libraries for the benefit of children. Over the next decade, Hartford's “First Lady of the Library” set up traveling libraries and book depositories all around the state at settlement houses, schools, and factories, setting the stage for today's modern branch library system. A nationally respected expert on library management, Hewins oversaw the quickly growing Hartford Public Library system—a rarity for a woman at the time, as most libraries were headed by men.

=== Campaigning for free public libraries ===
In Caroline M. Hewins and Books for Children, Jennie D. Lindquist writes that when Caroline Hewins first began working at the Young Men's Institute of Hartford, the library charged a fee of at least several dollars per year for membership. At the time, membership was the only way at the time to take advantage of the services of the library. In the late 19th century, several dollars was not a small amount of money, and as a consequence the library did not have a very large membership. But she worked at reducing the fee to one dollar per year, and library membership increased dramatically. And finally in 1892 membership became free.

Aside from her contributions to children's library services, Caroline Hewins also campaigned for the creation of public libraries and spoke of the importance of free libraries throughout Connecticut. In New England Women: Their Increasing Influence, Margaret Bush writes that Caroline traveled in Connecticut to encourage the creation of libraries and talked to people about the importance of children's services.

== Death ==
Caroline Hewins died on November 4, 1926, from pneumonia at the age of 80. She died at her home in Hartford just months after publishing her memoir, A Mid-Century Child and Her Books. Upon her death, the Library Journal wrote that she “was one of the beloved in the library profession. She made of herself a center from which radiated an immeasurable influence, especially in the great revolution in the library world which, instead of banning the children, made them the first thought of the librarian who could look at the future as well as the present.”

== Legacy ==
The legacy of Caroline Hewins continued through the Caroline M. Hewins Lectures, so named by Frederic G. Melcher. The lectures began in 1947 and continued until 1962. She is also remembered through the Hewins scholarship, available to assist women who want to become children's librarians to attain their educational goals. In late 1925, shortly before her death, she started the scholarship and it continues today.

Posthumous honors to Hewins include induction into the American Library Association's Library Hall of Fame (1951) and the Connecticut Women's Hall of Fame (1995).

American Libraries includes Caroline Hewins as one of the 100 Most Important Leaders we had in the 20th Century.

== Collection ==
In addition to her work inside the library, Hewins was an avid personal collector of books and she searched for works that would re-create her childhood library, eventually greatly exceeding it. Her collection of more than 4,000 volumes is now preserved as the Hewins Collection at the Connecticut Museum of Culture and History and the Hartford Public Library.

During her travels, Hewins acquired costumed dolls from every country she visited. At the library she would hold a New Year's Day reception with her collection, hosting little girls and their Christmas dolls. Today, the Hartford History Center at Hartford Public Library is home to her collection of more than 100 dolls, as well as originals of some of the letters she wrote to Hartford children from Europe, correspondence and newspaper clippings, and a vast collection of nineteenth- and twentieth-century European and American children's books.

== Works ==
=== Books ===
- Books for the Young: A Guide for Parents and Children. 1882.
- Books for Boys and Girls: A Selected List. Chicago, IL: American Library Association Publishing Board, 1915.
- A Traveler’s Letters to Boys and Girls. New York, NY: Macmillan, 1923.

=== Memoir ===
- A Mid-Century Child and Her Books. New York, NY: Macmillan Company, 1926.

=== Articles ===
- The History of Children's Books. The Atlantic Monthly (V.61, January 1888) pages 112-126
- Boys' and Girls' Reading. Library Journal (1882) page 182
- How Library Work with Children has Grown in Hartford and Connecticut. (H. W. Wilson company, 1914) p. 47-63
