= Stian Sivertzen =

Norwegian snowboarder

Personal information
- Born: 28 March 1989 (age 37) Drammen, Norway
- Height: 194 cm (6 ft 4 in) (2014)
Medal record
Men's snowboarding
Representing Norway
World Championships
Bronze medal – third place	2013 Stoneham	Snowboard Cross
Winter X Games
Bronze medal – third place	2009 Aspen	Snowboard Cross

Stian Sivertzen (born 28 March 1989) is a Norwegian snowboarder. He represents Kongsberg IF.

He placed eighth overall in the 2007-08 Snowboarding World Cup, and second in his special event boardercross, where he collected all of his 4180 points. He took his first victory in a World Cup event in September 2007, and has four podiums so far.
