= Kim-Rune Hansen =

Norwegian snowboarder (born 1988)

Kim-Rune Hansen (born 8 June 1988) is a Norwegian snowboarder from Hamar.

His greatest achievement is a victory in a March 2008 big air event during the 2007-08 Snowboarding World Cup circuit. Overall, he placed fifth in the big air section of the 2007-08 World Cup. He has placed three times among the top ten so far.
