= Tracie D. Hall =

Librarian, author, and advocate for the arts

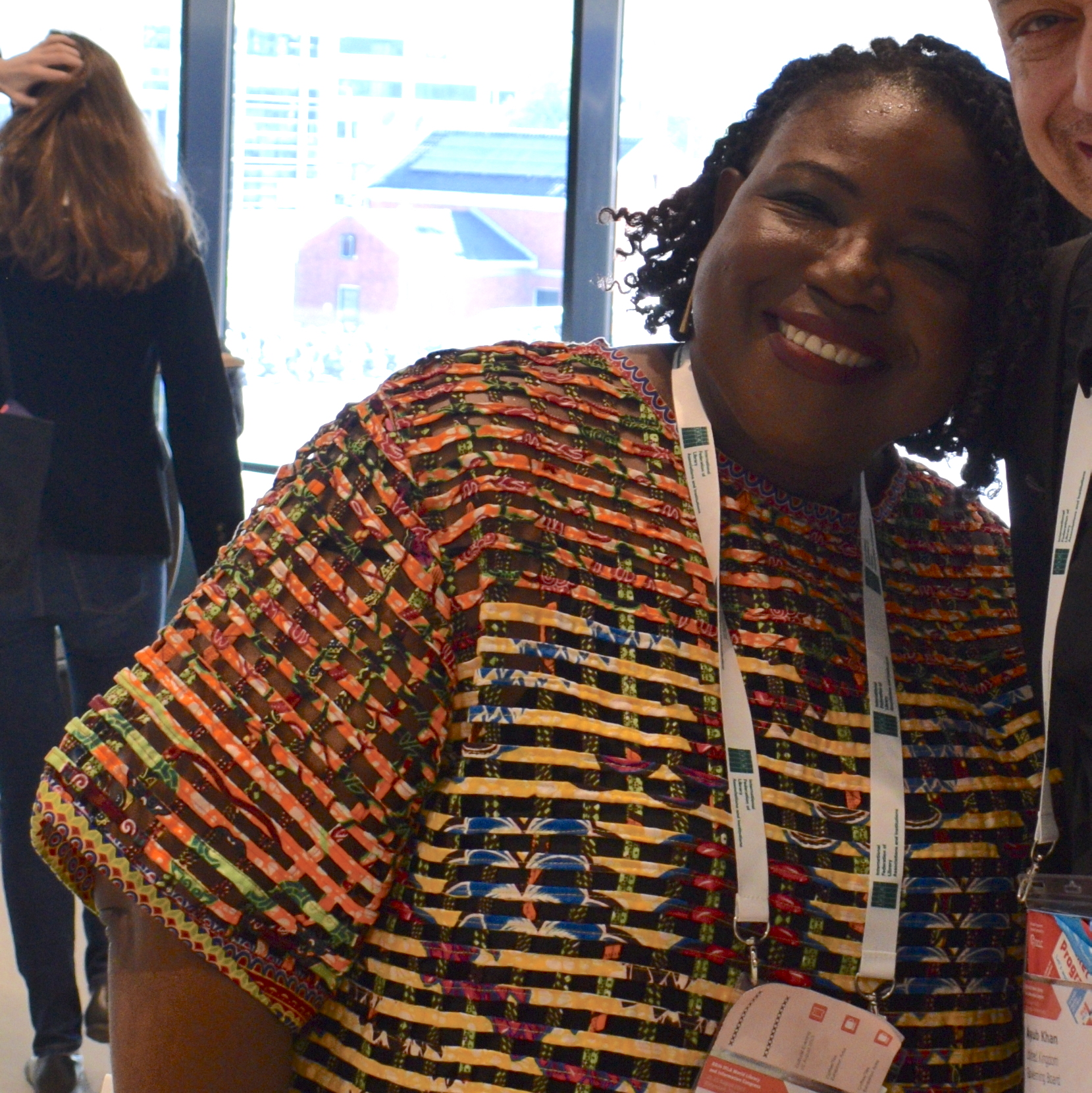
- Born: 1968; Los Angeles
- Education: University of California, Santa Barbara, Yale University, University of Washington, University of Nairobi, University of Dar es Salaam
- Occupation: Librarian
- Employer: American Library Association; Dominican University; Joyce Foundation; Queens Public Library; Seattle Public Library
- Awards: Literarian Award for Outstanding Service to the American Literary Community (2022)

Tracie D. Hall (born 1968) is an American librarian, author, curator, and advocate for the arts. Hall served as the executive director of the American Library Association from 2020 to 2023. She was the first African American woman to lead the organization since its founding in 1876.

== Early life and education ==
Hall was born and raised in the Watts neighborhood of Los Angeles.

She received a dual Bachelor of Arts degrees in law and society and African American studies from the University of California, Santa Barbara in 1991. She went on to receive a Master of Arts in international studies from Yale University and a Master of Library and Information Science (MLIS) from the University of Washington Information School, where she studied under Spencer Shaw.

== Career ==
Prior to her appointment as ALA executive director, Hall served as the director of the Joyce Foundation Culture Program. She also served as Chicago's Deputy Commissioner of the Department of Cultural Affairs and Special Events. In libraries, Hall was vice president of the Queens Public Library and assistant dean of the Dominican University Graduate School of Library and Information Science. She was the director of the Office for Diversity for the American Library Association from 2003 to 2006. Earlier in her career, she worked at the Seattle Public Library and Hartford Public Library and run a homeless shelter in Santa Monica. In the private sector, she worked as community investment strategist at Boeing’s Global Corporate Citizenship Division.

Hall is founder and curator of Rootwork Gallery, an experimental arts space in Chicago founded in 2016. She has served as a visiting curator at the School of the Art Institute of Chicago and a visiting professor at Southern Connecticut State University, Wesleyan University, and the Catholic University of America. A poet and playwright, Hall was a Cave Canem Foundation fellow.

On October 5, 2023, the American Library Association (ALA) announced Hall's resignation. Hall had been executive director since 2020, leading the Association through the COVID-19 pandemic.

External audio
- 'A Revolutionary Act': The Power Of A 21st Century Library Card, WBEZ
- Bonus Episode: One-on-One with New ALA Executive Director Tracie D. Hall, American Library Association

In 2023-2024 Hall is visiting fellow at the University of London Royal Holloway College, researching the impact of Brexit on public libraries in the United Kingdom.

In Fall 2024 Hall will be Distinguished Practitioner in Residence at the University of Washington Information School.

== Publications and presentations ==
Tracie D. Hall has written about community transformation, the digital divide, community disinvestment, the right to read for the incarcerated, and eradicating information poverty. She has written foundational work on the need for diversity in the library profession.

Hall has been a frequent speaker at scholarly conferences. She gave the Bobinski Lecture at the University of Buffalo in 2022: "The urgency of information equity." In 2022 she was also keynote at the Connecticut Library Association: "Information Redlining: The Role of Libraries in Disrupting the Growing Socioeconomic Divide."

Hall presented the keynote lecture at the United Kingdom Library Association in 2020: "Information Redlining: The Urgency to Close the Socioeconomic Divide and the Role of Libraries as Lead Interveners." In 2009 Hall keynoted at the International Federation of Library Associations in Bologna, Italy: "The 10 Ways Visionary Librarianship Can Change the World."

Writing in Time magazine in 2023 Hall quoted Senator Wendell Ford: "If information is the currency of democracy, then libraries are its banks."

== Awards and honors ==
- 2004.Mover and Shaker Award from Library Journal in 2004.
- City mayor Eddie Perez designated February 13 "Tracie Hall Day" to acknowledge her service to community of Hartford, Connecticut.
- 2022. The National Book Foundation announced Hall as the winner of the 2022 Literarian Award for Outstanding Service to the American Literary Community.
- 2023. Hall named 100 most influential people in the world by Time magazine.
- 2023. Hall in the "Forbes 50 Over 50: Impact List" as a warrior for the freedom to read.
- 2023. Roosevelt Institute honored Hall with the 2023 Freedom of Speech and Expression Award.
