= Tore Viken Holvik =

Norwegian snowboarder (born 1988)

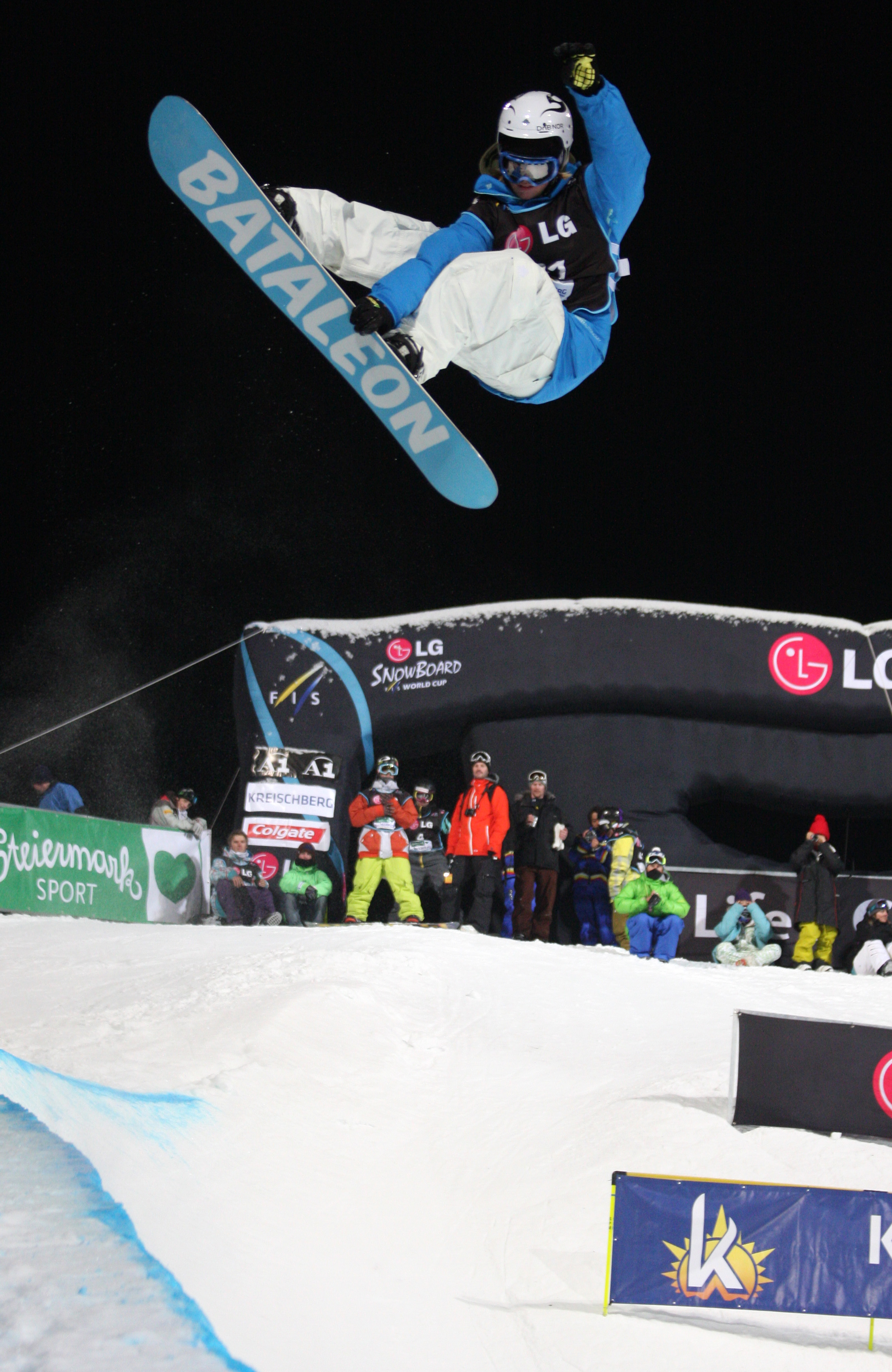

Tore Viken Holvik (born 21 October 1988) is a Norwegian snowboarder from Geilo.

His greatest achievement is a third place in a February 2008 halfpipe event during the 2007-08 Snowboarding World Cup circuit. He has placed seven times among the top ten so far, in halfpipe and big air.
