= Sindre Iversen =

Norwegian snowboarder (born 1989)

Sindre Iversen (born 5 April 1989) is a Norwegian snowboarder.

His greatest achievement is a third place in a February 2008 big air event during the 2007–08 FIS Snowboard World Cup circuit. He followed up with a fifth place in March the same year.
