= Dominic Harington =

English snowboarder (born 1984)

Dominic Harington (born 4 June 1984 in Leeds) is an English snowboarder. He competed at the 2014 Winter Olympics in Sochi.
