= Stefan Gimpl =

Austrian snowboarder

Medal record

Men's snowboarding

Representing Austria

FIS Snowboarding World Championships
| Bronze medal – third place | 2009 Gangwon | Big Air |

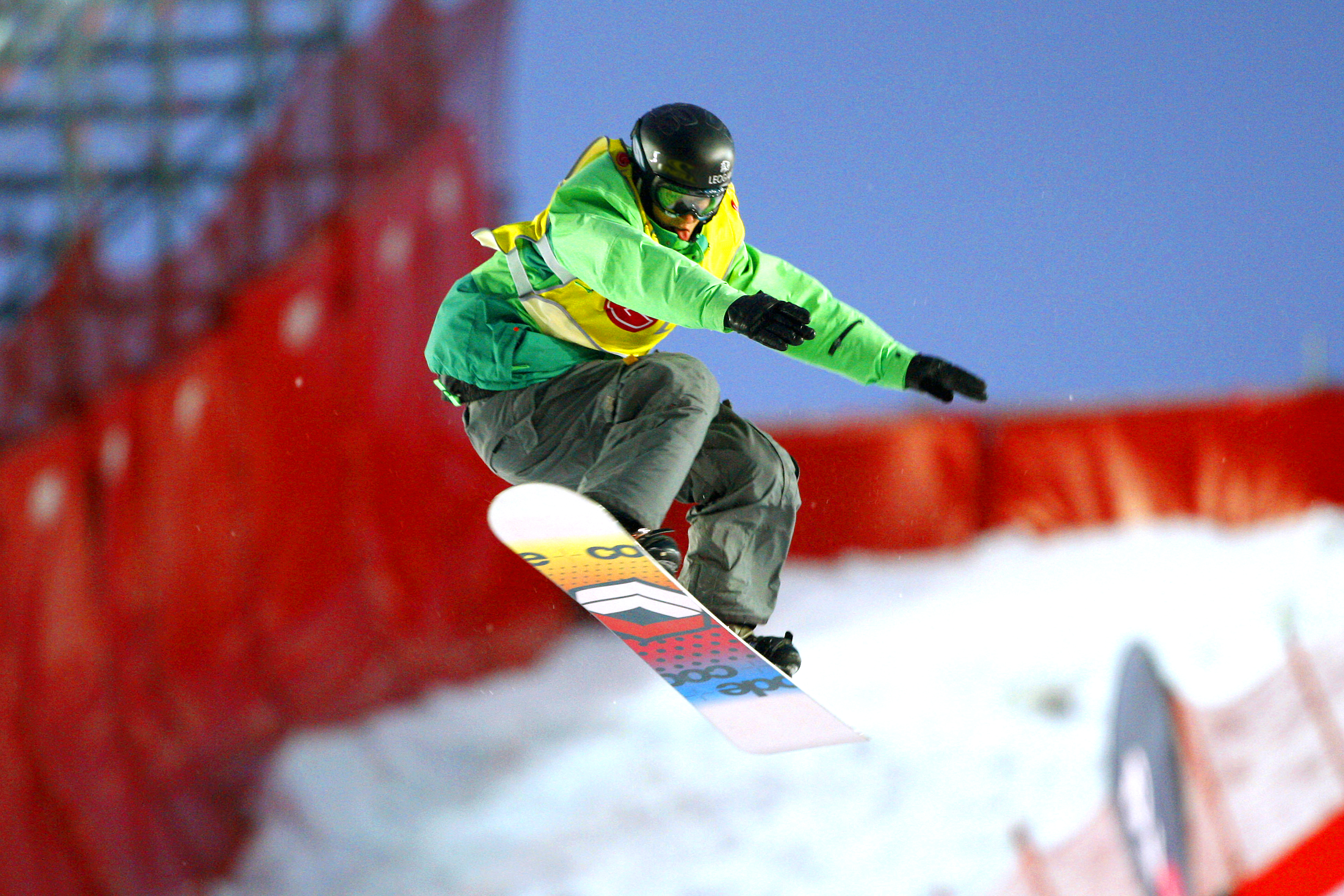
In Moscow on March 7, 2009

Stefan Gimpl (born October 31, 1979, Leogang) is an Austrian professional snowboarder. His specialty is the big air and he is the only rider so far who has won the Air & Style Contest three times in a row.

In 2006 Stefan gimpl won his first gold medal in Big Air and he did not get another until 2008 when he won three gold medals in a row. Stefan Gimpl has been snowboarding since 1992 and is still snowboarding. Stefan Gimpl is sponsored by FTWO, Smith, O'Neill, and Leogang. His hobbies are snowboarding, golfing, tennis, and photography. Stefan Gimpl has won many medals in Big Air in many different places. Stefan Gimpl won first place in Quebec City, on North American soil for the first time in five years.

== Career highlights ==
FIS World Snowboard Championships
2007 – Arosa, 18th at big air
2009 – Barcelona (Barcelona Snow Show), (gold) 1st at big air

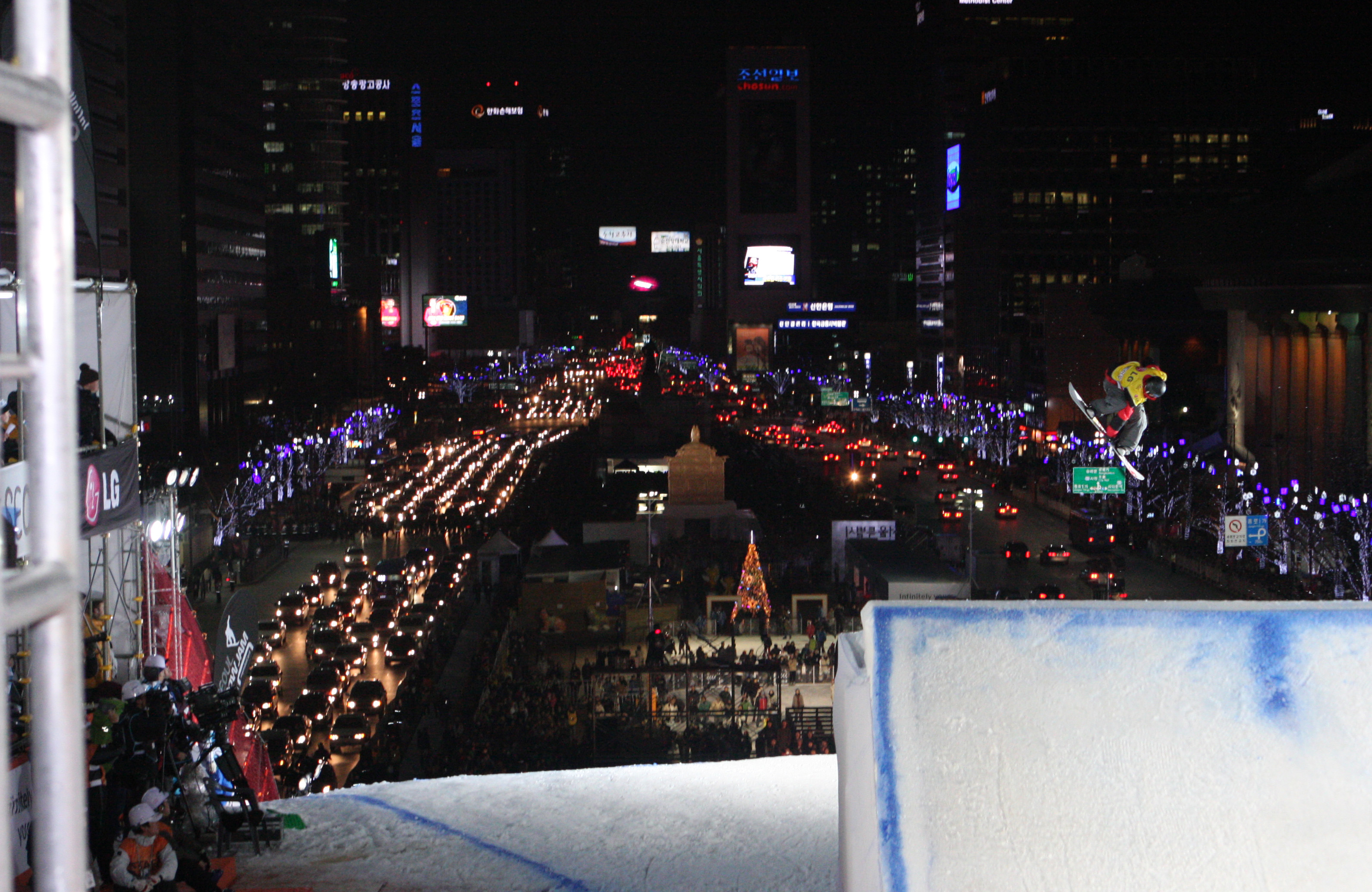
Gimpl at World Cup, Seoul, December 13, 2009

World Cup
2005 – Rotterdam, (silver) 2nd at big air
2006 – Klagenfurt, (gold) 1st at big air
2006 – Milan, (silver) 2nd at big air
2007 – Turin, (bronze) 3rd at big air
2007 – Rotterdam, (silver) 2nd at big air
2007 – Sofia, (gold) 1st at big air
2008 – Graz, (gold) 1st at big air
2008 – Moscow, (gold) 1st at big air
2009 – Quebec City, (gold) 1st at big air
2009 – Seoul, (silver) 2nd at big air

European Cup
2006 – Klagenfurt, (silver) 2nd at big air
South American Cup
2005 – Las Lenas, (silver) 2nd at big air
