= HartBeat Ensemble =

Theater company in Connecticut, U.S.

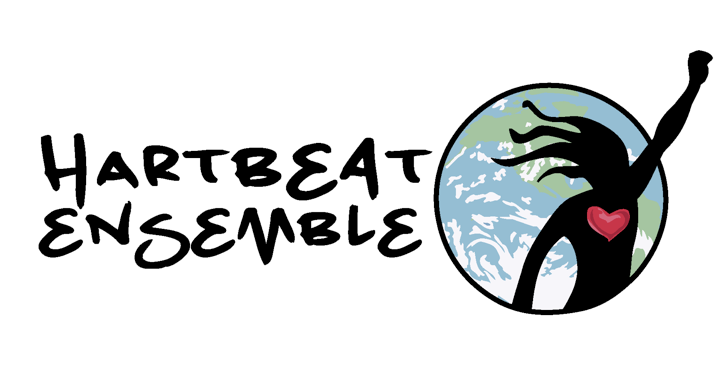

HartBeat Ensemble is a professional theater company located in Hartford, Connecticut.

== Company history ==
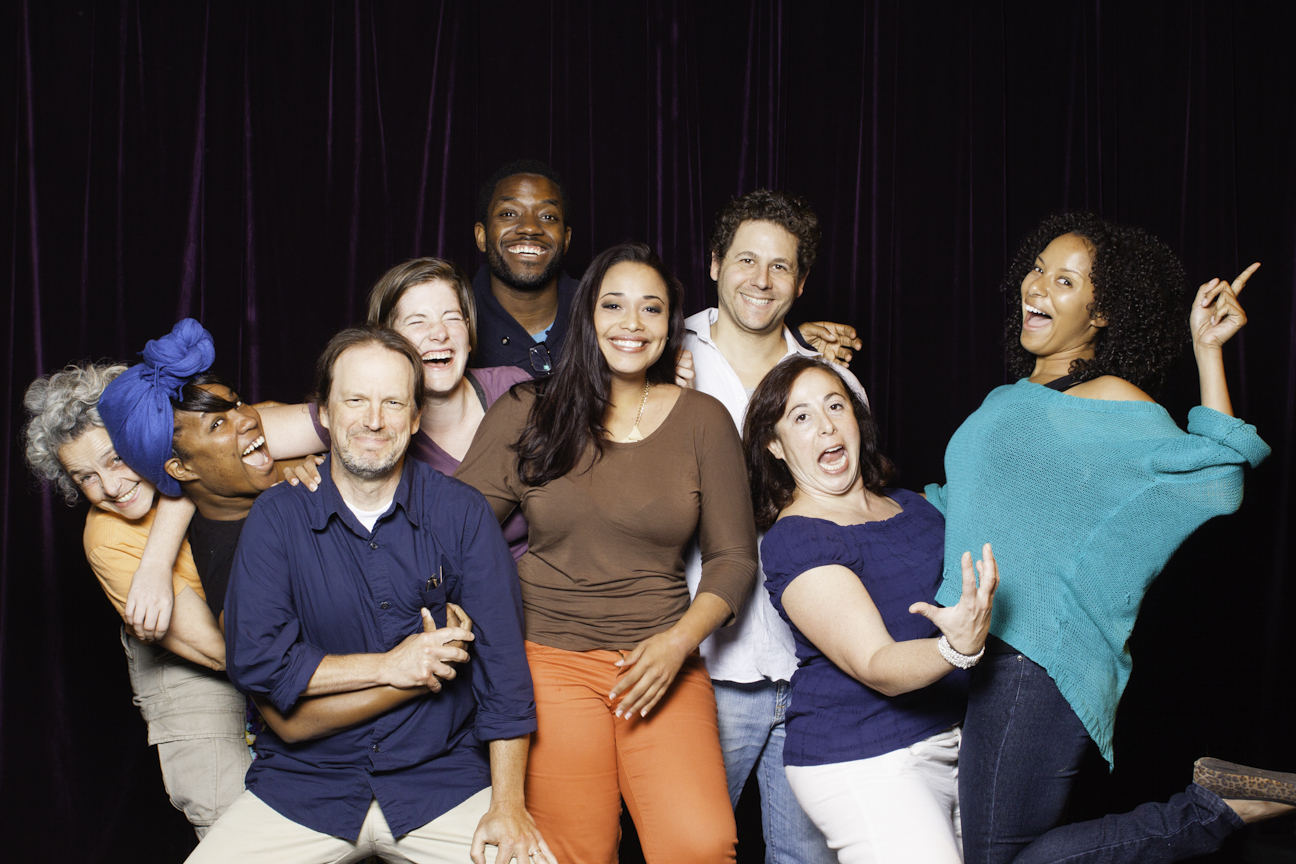

Gregory Tate, Julia Rosenblatt, and Steven Ginsburg founded HartBeat Ensemble in September 2001 in San Francisco, CA. Having worked with the San Francisco Mime Troupe for a combined total of 22 years, they decided to explore new styles and work in a city that needed change. Julia, a native of Hartford, CT, suggested that Hartford was a perfect location because of its economic contradiction: Hartford was both the second-poorest city in the nation and the capitol of the richest per-capita state in the nation.

In 2013, HartBeat moved into the Carriage House Theater located at 360 Farmington Avenue in Hartford. The new home will provide an opportunity for HartBeat to produce a season of events that extends beyond their mainstage and education productions. The Carriage House will serve as a permanent home for artists and the community to gather and experience live performances. The goal is to offer the Greater Hartford community consistently dynamic presentations by HartBeat Ensemble as well as other Connecticut-based artists and companies.

== Mainstages ==
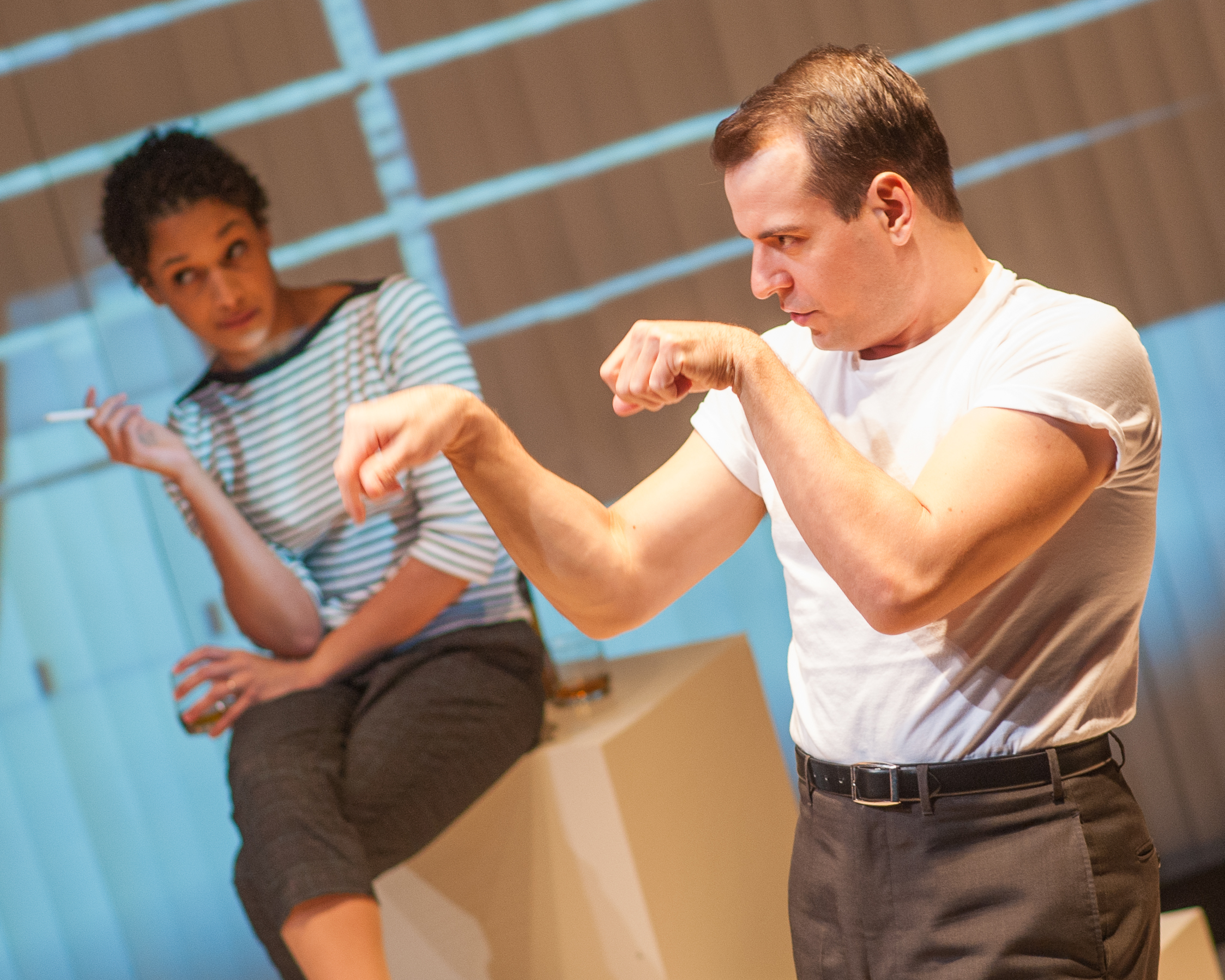
Jimmy & Lorraine: A Musing Andy Hart Photography

Drawn from styles ranging from commedia dell'arte to realism, HartBeat's Mainstage plays are original full-length works that tell extraordinary stories of ordinary people. Previous work includes: Graves (2001), News to Me (2004); Ebeneeza– A Hartford Holiday Carol (2006); The Pueblo (2007); Rich Clown, Poor Clown, Beggar Clown, Thief (2008); Flipside (2011); Riding the Turnpike (2013), Jimmy and Lorraine (Fall 2015) and Gross Domestic Product (Spring 2016).

HartBeat's first mainstage play, Graves, inspired by John Steinbeck's The Grapes of Wrath, used realism and hip-hop stylization to tell the story of a Hartford family reeling from the effects of corporate globalization. Graves toured throughout New England and in California. HartBeat's second mainstage play, News To Me, about the No Child Left Behind Act, enjoyed a five-week run at the Charter Oak Cultural Center in downtown Hartford. In December 2006, HartBeat debuted its hit Ebeneeza – A Hartford Holiday Carol, which has become an annual holiday event. In June 2007, HartBeat workshopped The Pueblo: a dual language play that explores the changing politics in Latin America. In October 2008, HartBeat opened Rich Clown, Poor Clown, Beggar Clown, Thief at the City Arts on Pearl. Rich Clown is an adult clown cabaret that takes an outrageous looks at The War On Poverty.

== Open-Air ==
HartBeat's Open-Air performances bring free theater to public parks, streets and marches. In the summer of 2006, HartBeat expanded their Open Air Theater Program to include the annual Plays In The Parks (PIP) series, which tours through Hartford city parks, bringing theater into the neighborhoods. PIP is made up of a series of 10-minute plays derived from interviews on a particular theme. In 2006, each play was about a different work sector in Greater Hartford. For PIP 2007, HartBeat partnered with CT Coalition to End Homeless to interview and create plays about people who are homeless in the area. In 2008, HartBeat partnered with Universal Health Care Foundation of CT to create plays about the uninsured and underinsured people in Connecticut. PIP 2009 focused on "The Economic Crisis Hitting Home."

== Education ==
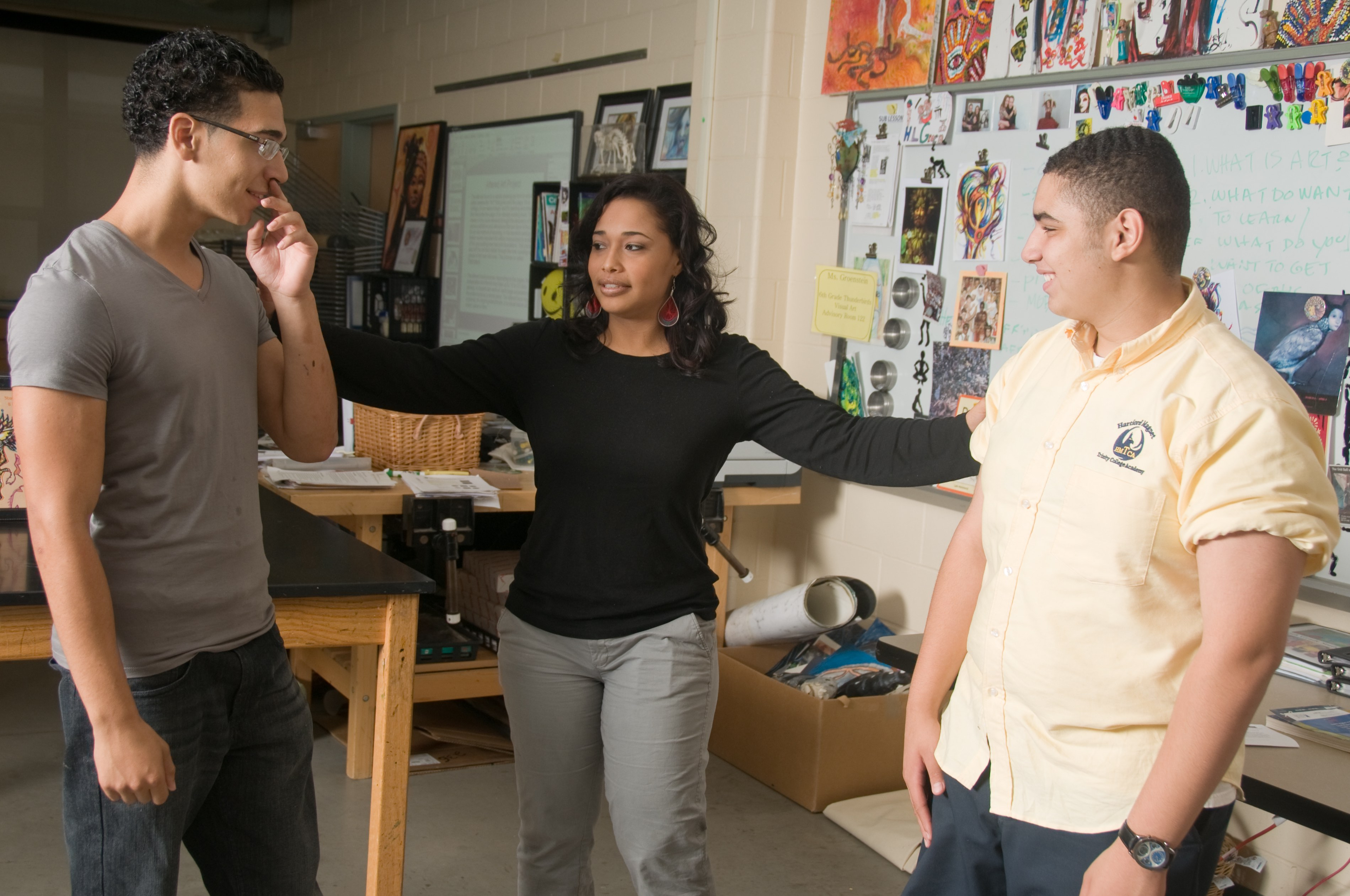

HartBeat has led educational workshops at over 40 institutions including public schools, universities, unions, shelters, and treatment centers. HartBeat's Education Programs, inspired by Augusto Boal's Theater of the Oppressed, teaches theater as a form of conflict resolution, civic engagement and deeper learning. The Ensemble's core education programs are the Youth Play Institute (YPI), Startin’ Drama (Bullying Prevention/Positive School Climate), and Arts-Based Curriculum Integration (ABCi).

=== Youth Play Institute (YPI) ===
Youth Play Institute (YPI) is a professional paid internship in acting, playwriting, theater design or stage management for young adults between the ages of 16 and 21. HartBeat conducts two 8-week sessions, with an additional 5-week summer version of the program. YPI was originally conceived to reduce student racial isolation while teaching theater skills at a high level and to increase student academic performance. HartBeat recently restructured YPI with a new emphasis on workforce development and career readiness. The group is given a relevant topic to research using HartBeat's method of first-hand interviews. Each session culminates three public performances followed by a post-show dialogue between the audience and the actor/playwrights.

=== Startin' Drama (Bullying Prevention/Positive School Climate) ===
Startin’ Drama teaches the essential elements needed for a positive school climate; Empathy, Engagement and Empowerment. Startin’ Drama moves beyond typical bullying prevention programs by creating and performing scenes that come from participants’ specific experiences. Examples of common scene topics are: rumors, cyber bullying, racial stereotypes and anger management.

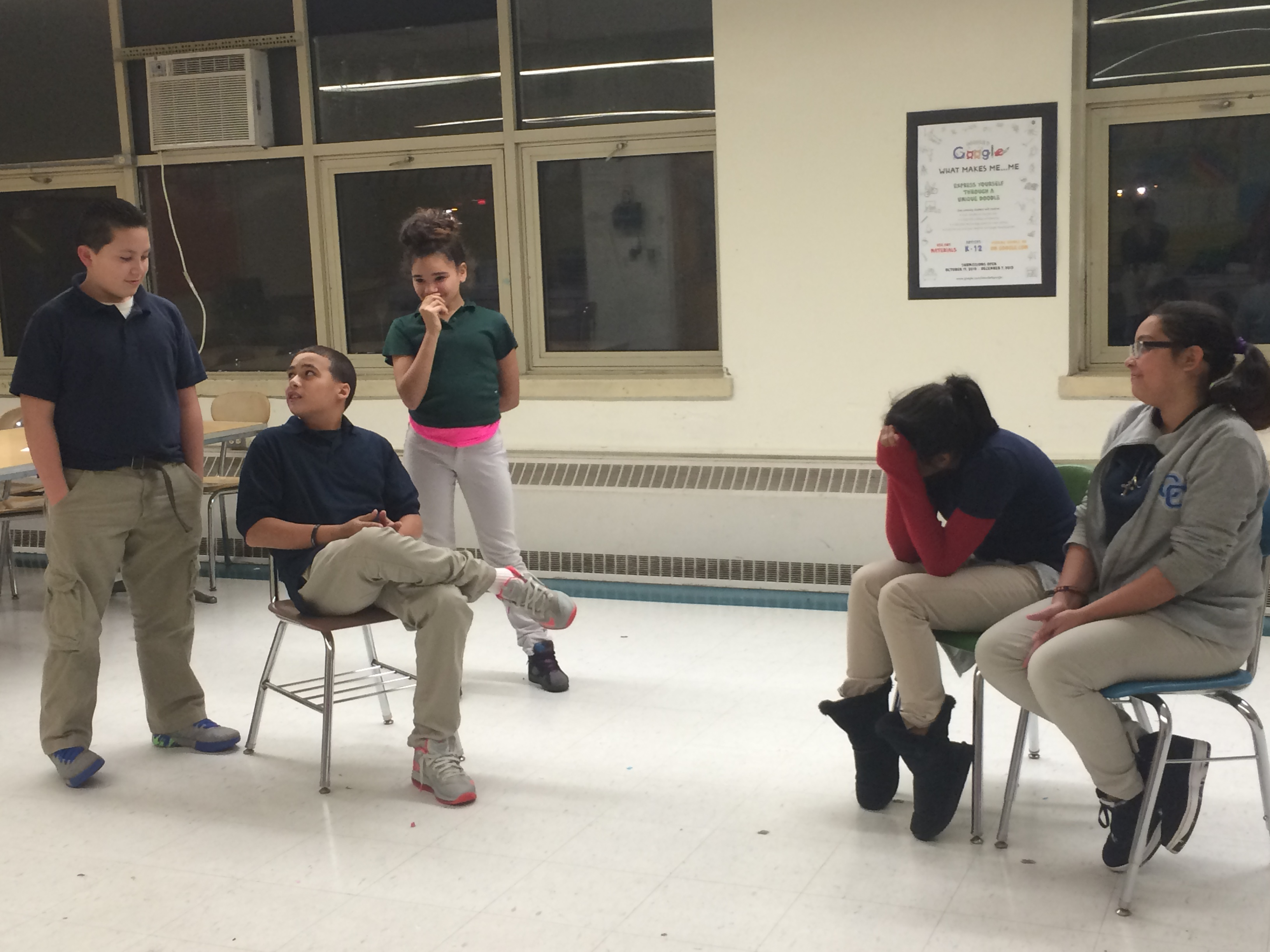

HartBeat delivers Startin’ Drama in two formats:

- 60-Minute Assembly: HartBeat performs relevant scenes for the audience. After each scene, students brainstorm alternative actions for the characters that might change the outcome of the scene. HartBeat replays the scene with the suggested alternative OR with youth who volunteer to take the place of the protagonists and change the scene themselves. The scene can be replayed multiple times, each with a different suggestion. It becomes a fun and entertaining way to practice peaceful conflict resolution.
- After School Program: Startin’ Drama's after-school curriculum puts both the playwriting and performing into the participants’ hands. HartBeat teaching artists guide students through the process of writing, rehearsing and performing their own scenes for an audience. The program culminates with an interactive theater experience for the school community.

=== Arts-Based Curriculum Integration (ABCi) ===
Arts Based Curriculum Integration (ABCi) reaches visual, auditory and kinesthetic learners all at the same time by bringing events, characters and conflicts to life. ABCi residencies are built around specific English Language Arts or Social Studies units. HartBeat teaching artists work closely with the classroom teacher to customize each ABCi residency in order to target subject mastery and achievement of appropriate Common Core standards. The target population is K-12th.

Language Arts skills targeted in past residencies include:

● Reading Comprehension: Identify characters, settings and major events in a story.

● Writing: Planning, revising, editing and rewriting.

● Reading Comprehension: Making inferences and citing textual evidence.

Social Studies topics explored in past residencies include:

● The events leading up to the US Revolutionary War.

● The UN's Convention on the Rights of the Child.

● The debate about the Keystone Pipeline.

== Awards ==
HartBeat Ensemble received a Best Of Hartford Award in the 2004, 2006, 2007, and 2008 Hartford Advocate Readers Poll.

In 2009 HartBeat was recognized by the Theater Communications Group as part of the New Generations Program for its ability to cultivate new audiences for theater. HartBeat regularly appears in the Hartford Advocate’s "Best Of" edition as one of the top three professional theaters in the area.
