= Ben Kilner (snowboarder) =

Scottish snowboarder

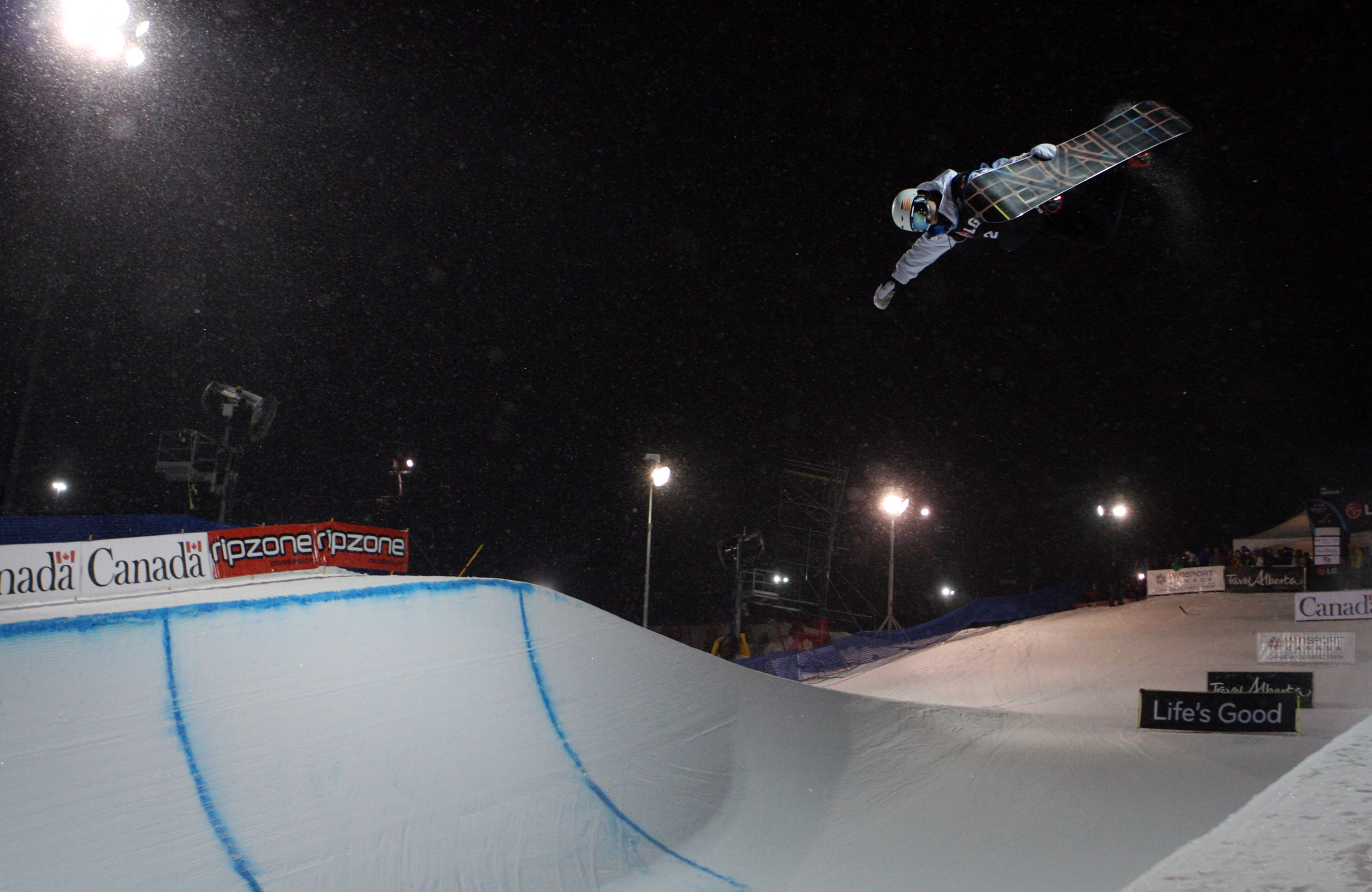
Ben Kilner at the LG Snowboard FIS World Cup in January 2010

Ben Kilner (born 21 August 1988) is a professional snowboarder from Banchory, Scotland. He was a member of the British 2010 Winter Olympics and 2014 Winter Olympics Team and represented Britain in the Men's Halfpipe.

Started snowboarding at age 9 and first competing at age 10 in the Rider cup series in Scotland. After winning the 1998, 1999, 2000 and 2001 Rider Cup series Ben competed in the first British championships in 2001 and finished 1st. He joined the Scottish squad and travelled with his teammates around Europe and eventually at age 13 competed internationally in the Paul Mitchell US Grand Prix at June Mountain, California against Olympic gold medalist, Ross Powers. Ben continued competing internationally in the Junior World Championships, European Open and competitions alike. At age 16 Ben was promoted to the British Snowboard team where he competed in his first World Cup in Bardonecchia, Italy. Continuing to win in his age category in the British championships each year Ben was mostly based abroad and travelled with his team competing on the international level. After narrowly missing the Turin Olympic qualification Ben continued his career and picked up sponsors Nike, K2 snowboards, Giro, and Thirty Two. He joined management agency Red Sky and pursued his dream to qualify for Vancouver Winter Olympics in 2010. Previously finishing 3rd in the Canada World cup weeks before the Olympics Ben earned himself enough points to meet Team GB's criteria. After finishing a respectable 18th at the Winter Olympics he placed 7th in the Spanish World cup weeks later. Ben competed in the 2014 Sochi Winter Olympics, finishing 16th in the qualifications rounds of the Men's Half-pipe.
