= Spencer Shaw =

American librarian

Spencer Gilbert Shaw
- Born: August 15, 1916; Hartford, Connecticut, US
- Died: June 16, 2010 (aged 93); Farmington, Connecticut
- Education: University of Chicago; University of Wisconsin (BLS); Hampton University (BS)
- Occupation: Librarian
- Employer: University of Washington Information School

Spencer Gilbert Shaw (August 15, 1916 – June 16, 2010) was an American librarian and educator specializing in library services to children. He taught at the Information School of the University of Washington (1970–1986) and served as president of the Association for Library Services to Children (1975–1976).

== Early life and education ==
Shaw was born in Hartford, Connecticut, on August 15, 1916, to parents Martha Taylor Shaw and Eugene Shaw. His father worked at the Hartford National Bank & Trust Company, while his mother was a homemaker and community organizer who supervised the desegregation of the workforce of G. Fox & Co. during the 1940s. Raised in a predominantly Jewish neighborhood of northwest Hartford, Shaw was the only African American student in his primary and secondary schools. He earned a Bachelor of Science degree from Hampton University in 1940, a Bachelor of Library Science from the University of Wisconsin–Madison in 1941, and completed advanced graduate studies at the University of Chicago Graduate Library School in 1949. He served in the US Army during World War II, enlisting in 1943 and serving at Fort Devens, Massachusetts. Sent to officer training school, he served as a second lieutenant for the rest of the war.

== Library career ==
Shaw started his career as branch manager of the Upper Albany Branch of the Hartford Public Library from 1941 to 1949. He was the first African American librarian hired by the library system. From 1949 to 1959 he was program specialist in children's services at Brooklyn Public Library, where he built a national reputation for his storytelling and community-centered programming. In 1959, Shaw became consultant in library service to children in the Nassau County Public Library System, supervising children's services across 52 branches. From 1961 to 1968 he wrote and narrated a WHLI weekly radio program, Story Hour on the Air. He was a visiting instructor at library schools nationwide, including Queens College, the University of Maryland, Drexel University, University of Hawaiʻi at Mānoa, University of North Texas, Syracuse University, University of North Carolina at Greensboro, University of Illinois at Urbana–Champaign, and Kent State University.

In 1970, he became a lecturer at the Information School of the University of Washington and received promotions to associate professor in 1971 and professor in 1977. He retired in 1986 with the rank of professor emeritus. The University of Washington established the Spencer G. Shaw Children's Literature Lecture Series in his honor. Shaw delivered lectures and held teaching residencies in Australia, Brazil, Cyprus, England, Hong Kong, Japan, New Zealand, the Netherlands, South Africa, and Zimbabwe. He served as president of the Association for Library Service to Children in 1975–76, delegate to the 1970 White House Conference on Children, chair of the Caldecott Medal committee, and board member of Connecticut College's Connecticut Storytelling Center.

Following retirement in 1986, Shaw returned to Connecticut and lived in Bloomfield until his death. At the invitation of Upper Albany branch manager Tracie D. Hall, a former student from the University of Washington, he volunteered as a storyteller at the Hartford Public Library in his late 80s. Shaw died at John Dempsey Hospital in Farmington on June 16, 2010, at the age of 93. One of seven siblings, he was survived by his brother John Shaw, his sisters Lucille Laury and Lucretia Jackson, and several nieces and nephews. He never married and had no children.

== Awards and honors ==
Shaw received numerous awards and honors throughout his life.

- Honorary doctorate of literature from the University of Wisconsin in 1992.
- A Carnegie Corporation Fellowship for Graduate Study in Librarianship in 1940.
- Grolier Foundation Award from the American Library Association (ALA) in 1983
- American Library Association Honorary Membership 1988.
- Distinguished Service Award from the Association for Library Service to Children in 1998,
- Distinguished alumnus awards from Hampton University and the University of Wisconsin
- Lifetime Achievement Award from the Connecticut Affiliate of the Black Caucus of the American Library Association
- Nancy Blankenship Pryor Award from the Washington State Commission for the Humanities and the Washington State Library.
