= Iouri Podladtchikov =

Russian-Swiss snowboarder

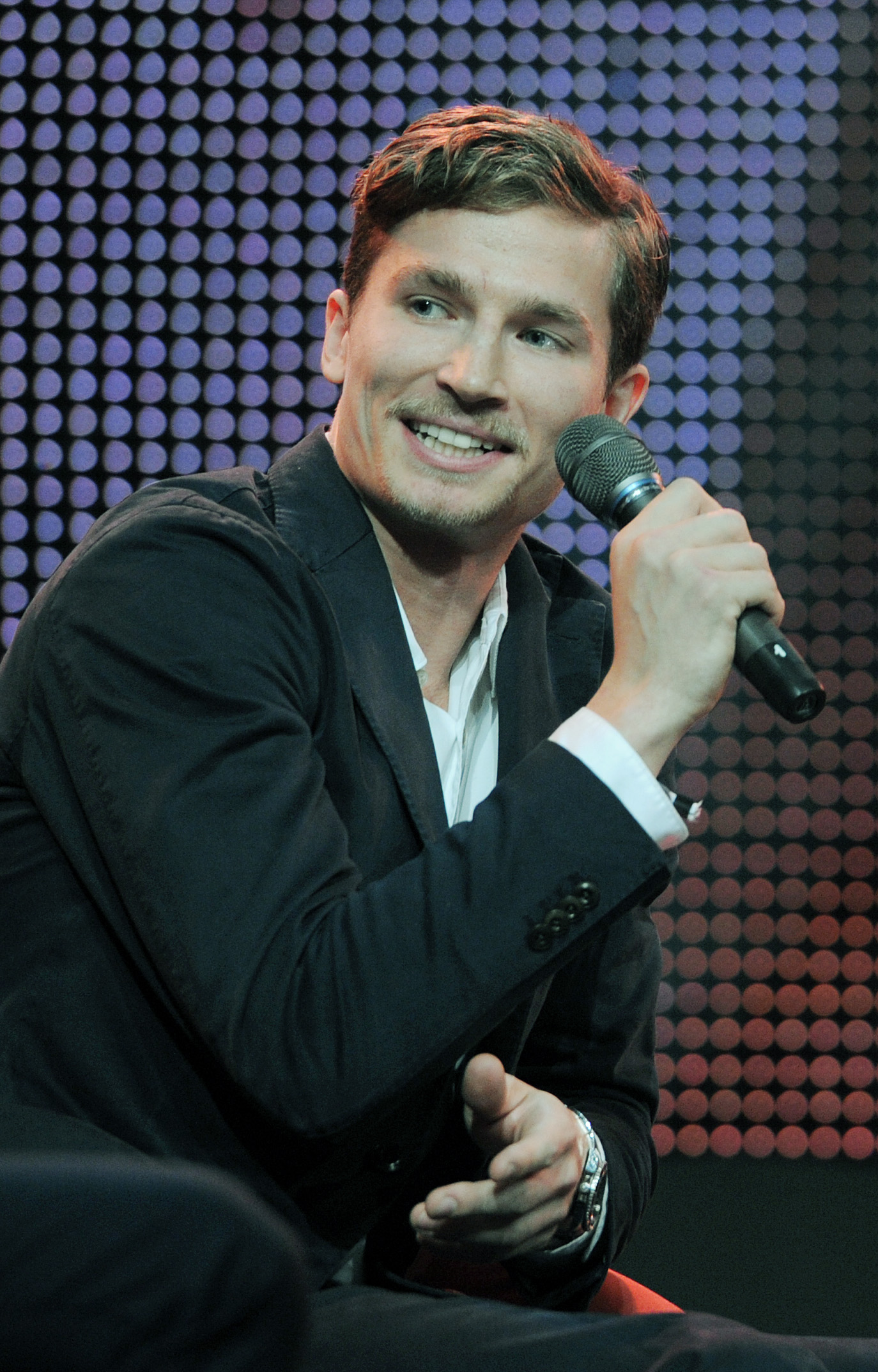
- Podladtchikov in 2014

Personal information
- Full name: Iouri Iourеvich Podladtchikov
- Born: 13 September 1988 (age 38) Podolsk, Moscow Oblast, Soviet Union
- Height: 5 ft 11 in (180 cm)
- Weight: 181 lb (82 kg)

Sport
- Sport: Snowboarding
Medal record
Representing Switzerland
Olympic Games
Gold medal – first place	2014 Sochi	Halfpipe
FIS Snowboarding World Championships
Gold medal – first place	2013 Stoneham	Halfpipe
Silver medal – second place	2011 La Molina	Halfpipe
Silver medal – second place	2017 Sierra Nevada	Halfpipe
Winter X Games
Silver medal – second place	2010 Aspen	SuperPipe
Silver medal – second place	2012 Aspen	SuperPipe
Silver medal – second place	2016 Oslo	SuperPipe
Bronze medal – third place	2015 Aspen	SuperPipe

Iouri Iourеvich Podladtchikov (Russian: Юрий Юрьевич Подладчиков, born 13 September 1988) is a Russian-born Swiss snowboarder. He rides goofy stance. He has competed since 2000. He won the gold medal for the halfpipe at the 2014 Winter Olympics in Sochi.

== Early life ==
Podladtchikov was born in Russia in Podolsk, a city near Moscow and relocated with his family to Switzerland in 1996 at age four. The family also spent time in Sweden and the Netherlands before settling in Switzerland, relocating to follow his father's job as a geophysicist at various universities. His parents, Yuri Podladtchikov and Valentina Podladtchikov, had met while studying mathematics. He has three brothers, including a fraternal twin that he shared a bedroom with for 15 years.

== Career ==
Podladtchikov grew up in Davos, Switzerland, and started snowboarding in 2000. He changed nationality after competing for Russia at the 2006 Olympics in Turin at age 17, where he placed 37th.

Graduated from Davos Sports High School in 2008. Podladtchikov, known on the circuit as I-Pod, won the halfpipe World Cup title in 2008. In December 2008, he won the Zurich Sports Award Team/Individual athlete. He won silver at Winter X Games XIV in 2010.

In 2013, he won the gold medal at the FIS Snowboarding World Championship. He placed fourth at the 2010 Winter Olympics in Vancouver for Switzerland. At the 2014 Winter Olympics, he won the gold medal in the men's halfpipe.

At the Winter X Games Europe in 2010, Podladtchikov successfully landed a Double McTwist 1260, putting him in first place with a score of 98.00, the second highest in Winter X Games history. Podladtchikov is the only other person in the world besides Shaun White, Ben Stewart, and Markus Malin that has landed a Double McTwist 1260.

Podladtchikov also competes regularly at major events on the Swatch TTR World Snowboard Tour. He finished the 06/07 season as world no. 6 on the Swatch TTR World Ranking List and had five top-10 finishes on the TTR Tour in 07/08. His 2009/10 season on the TTR Tour has been successful, with two wins at Swatch TTR halfpipe events, the 6Star O'Neill Evolution 2010 and the 5Star Burton Canadian Open. His win came after a couple of second places at the Dew Tour and Winter XGames. He finished the 2009/10 season as world no. 2, right behind TTR World Tour Champion, Peetu Piiroinen of Finland.

Pepe Regazzi and Marco Bruni are his Swiss coaches.

His nickname is IPod, taken from the vowel i of his first name and the first syllable of his last name.

First rider to perform a Cab double cork 1440° in a halfpipe competition, a move he called the "YOLO Flip." This trick is a derivative of the Haakon Flip created by Terje Haakonsen in the early 1990s, which is essentially hitting a transition switch stance and performing a frontside 180° back to your regular stance and then into a McTwist (originated by the skateboarder Mike McGill), which is a backside inverted 540° spin: so in total it is a spin with two full rotations into a 720°.

Variations of this have evolved into the 540°, 720°, 900°, 1080°, 1260° and now the 1440°. Professional skateboarder and athlete Danny Way performed a version of the Haakon Flip on a skateboard on a halfpipe with minimal recognition several years prior to its being introduced into the snowboard world.

After a series of injuries in 2018 and 2019 including a traumatic brain injury, concussion, broken nose, ruptured Achilles tendon, and cerebral hemorrhage, he announced his retirement from competition on August 22, 2020.

== Personal life ==
Podladtchikov speaks four languages, has trained in ballet, and is interested in photography. He studied art history at the University of Zurich, and in 2019 he began studying in the Creative Practices Program at the International Center of Photography in New York. Following this he returned to Zurich to study in the BFA program at the Zurich University of the Arts. On his website featuring his work, he states he is interested in "[investigating] places, objects and social interactions where a certain weight and volatility are inextricably intertwined. The volatility of these situations is reinterpreted and compared through metaphorical representations".

== Best event results ==
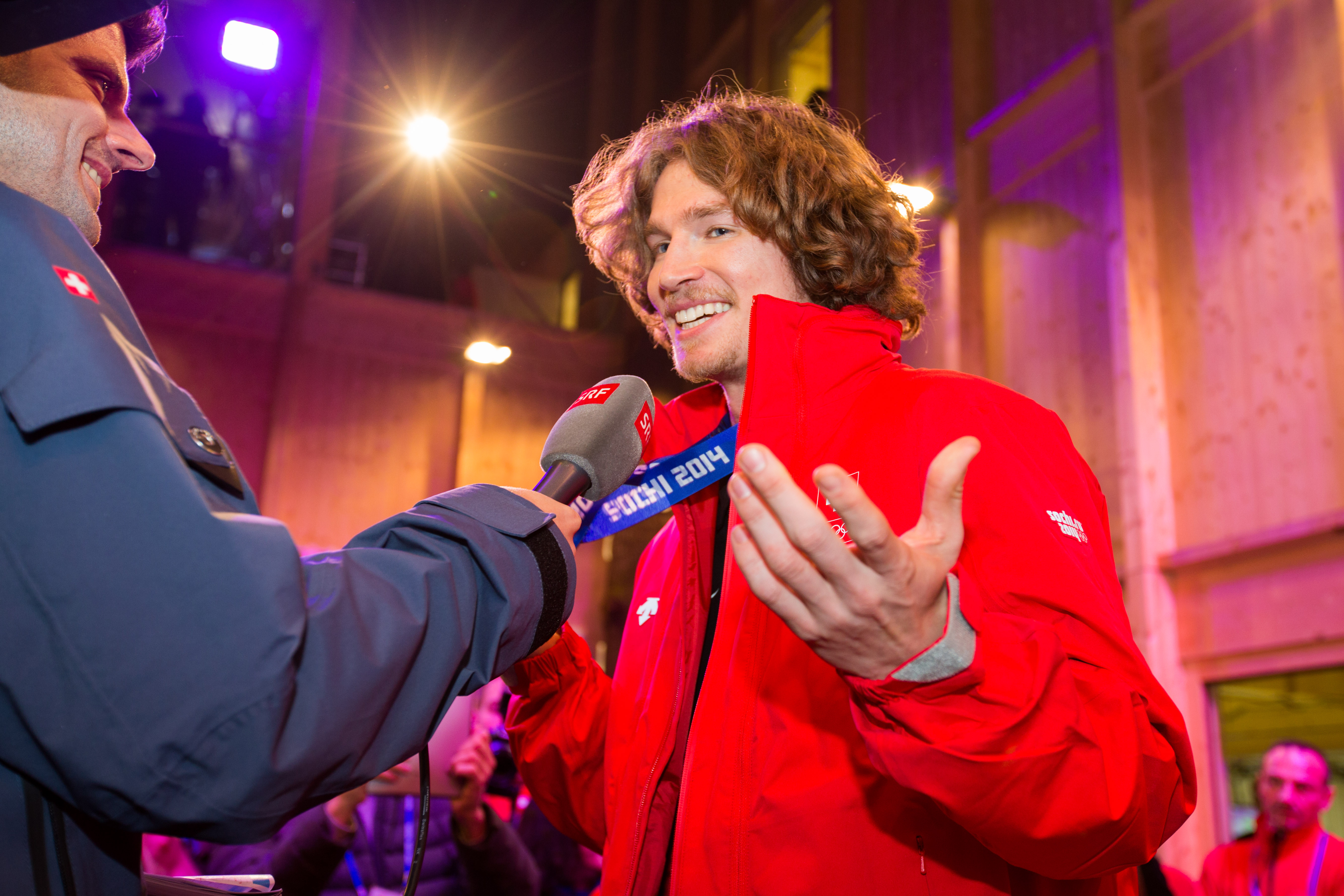
2014 Winter Olympics: Iouri Podladtchikov giving an interview whilst celebrating his gold medal at the House of Switzerland in Sochi.

- Winter Olympic Games
- 2014, Gold Medal, Men's Halfpipe Sochi Russia*
- 2010 4th Place, Men's Halfpipe Vancouver Canada
- TTR
- 2009, 3rd Place, 6Star Burton European Open Halfpipe
- 2008, 3rd Place, 4Star Fiat Rock the Spot Halfpipe
- 2008, 4th Place, 6Star Burton European Open Halfpipe
- 2007, 2nd Place, 6Star O'Neill Evolution Halfpipe
- 2007, 2nd Place, 6Star Burton European Open Halfpipe
- FIS-World Cup
- 2009, 2nd Place, Halfpipe Cardrona NZE World Cup
- 2007, 1st Place, Halfpipe, Saas Fee World Cup
- 2007, 1st Place, Halfpipe, Saas Fee Europa Cup
