= Hartford Public Library =

Library in Connecticut, US

Coordinates: 41.762°N 72.6743°W

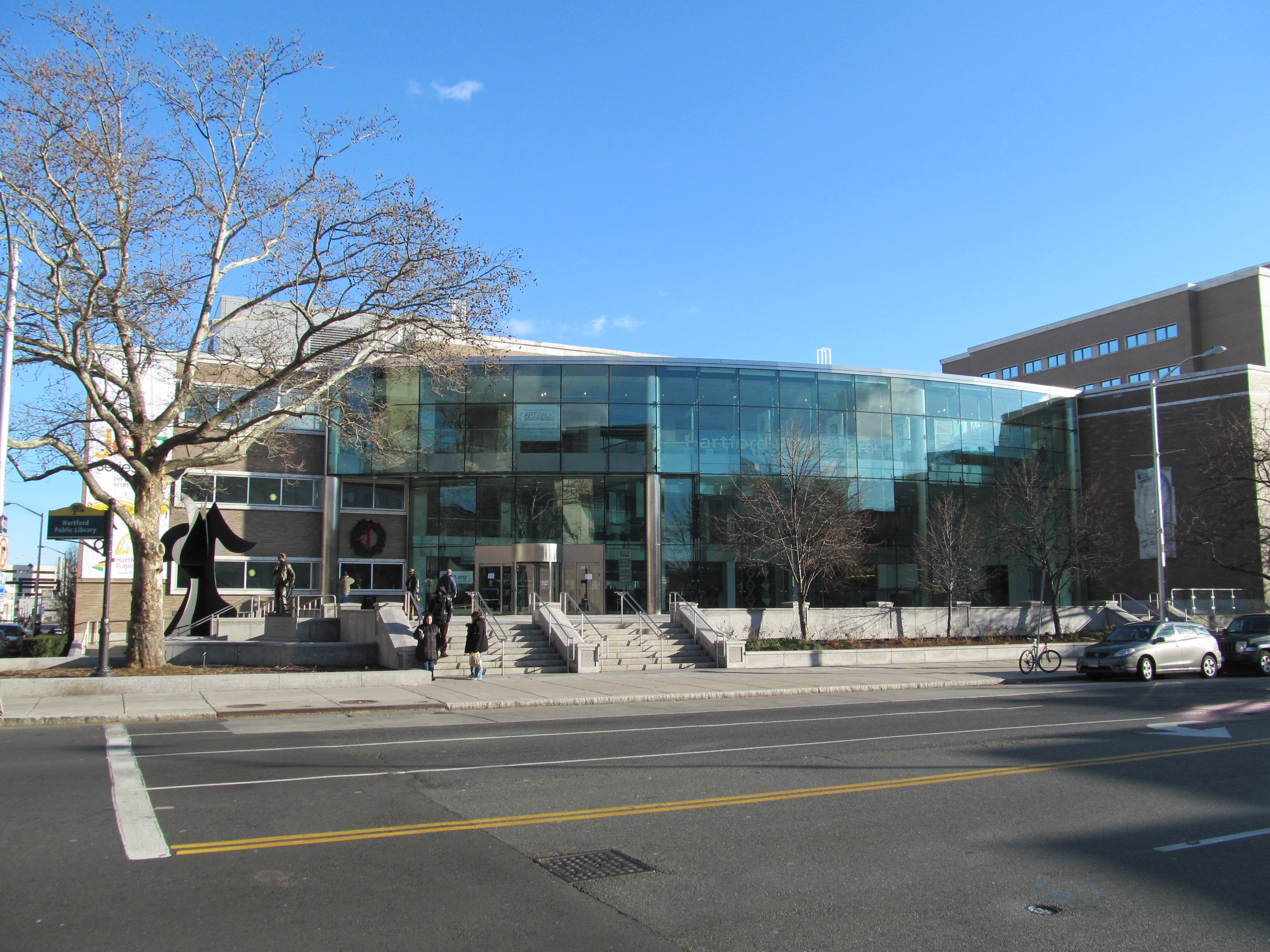
- Hartford Public Library
- Location: Hartford, CT, United States
- Established: 1774
- Branches: 9 + 1 Mobile Services Library

Collection
- Size: 500,000 items

Access and use
- Population served: 125,000

Other information
- Website: http://www.hplct.org/

The Hartford Public Library serves the city of Hartford, Connecticut, United States. The library system currently operates branch locations including Albany, Barbour, Camp Field, Dwight, Park Street Library @ the Lyric, and SAND/Ropkins, and it also offers once-a-week public service through the Boundless Library @ Rawson (Sarah Rawson Elementary School). Three former neighborhood branches––Blue Hills, Goodwin, and Mark Twain––have closed. All active locations provide free public-access computers and free Wi-Fi.

== History ==
The Hartford Public Library began in 1774 as the Library Company, started by a group of city leaders. The founding members included Jonathan Brace, Jeremiah Wadsworth, Daniel Wadsworth, George Bull, Elisha Colt, Theodore Dwight, George Goodwin, Chauncey Goodrich and Thomas Y. Seymour. The Library Company was a subscription company and opened with some 700 books. The Library Company changed its name to the Hartford Library Company in 1799 and met in the Grammar School House, once located where the east end of the Municipal Building (Hartford City Hall) is today. Its first librarian was Solomon Porter, a Yale graduate and principal of the Grammar School.

In 1838, Hartford resident and the first United States Commissioner of Education Henry Barnard organized lectures and debates for young men and called this association the Hartford Young Men's Institute. They invited Hartford Library Company subscribers to join with them, offering them lifetime memberships. Library company members agreed and brought to the institute their collection numbering over 3,000 volumes.

In 1842, Daniel Wadsworth offered the Young Men's Institute a stake in what he hoped would become the cultural center of Hartford. Members accepted and, in 1844, the Young Men's Institute moved into the new Wadsworth Atheneum, eventually sharing space with the fine arts gallery, the Watkinson Library, The Connecticut Historical Society and the Hartford Art School. One of the Institute's most prominent librarians from 1846-1868, essayist Henry M. Bailey wrote in 1850 Thoughts in a Library about the mood there:

"It is a stormy evening: the rain patters on the roof
and beats against the windows. All without is cold and
cheerless, all within is pleasant and cheerful..."

In 1875, the Young Men's Institute hired Caroline Hewins as its head librarian. She was 29 years old. She held the position for 51 years, until her death in 1926.

The institute's lecture series was well attended for a number of years. Guest lecturers included Oliver Wendell Holmes, Horace Greeley, Dr. Horace Bushnell, Rev. Henry Ward Beecher, Samuel Clemens, Charles Dudley Warner and Ralph Waldo Emerson. In the late 1870s the popularity of lecture series diminished. The institute noted: “We have a library, not an institute; its members are, at least half of them, ladies; and the men belonging are old as well as young; being therefore, not alone for the young, not alone for men, and not an institute but a library, it seemed time to call it by its right name.” In 1878, the private institution changed its name to the Hartford Library Association.

By the late 19th century, the people of Hartford recognized the need for a free public library. An agreement was reached between Wadsworth Atheneum regarding property ownership. A request for funds went out to city residents so that the building could be modified with a new library wing added to the back of the original structure. Funds were also needed to pay for the ongoing maintenance of what was to become the new public literary.

More than 2,000 people donated money to this project. Hartford native Junius Morgan pledged $100,000 from London; his son, J.P. Morgan, pledged $50,000 from New York; other large donors included Lucy Morgan Goodwin and her sons J.J. Goodwin and the Rev. Francis Goodwin; the Keney brothers; and, Hartford banker Roland Mather. Contributions were made by the employees of Colt's, Sigourney Tool, Case, Lockwood and Brainard Co., Atlantic Screw Works, and many other factories. School children contributed nickels and dimes.

Within two years from the start of the campaign, the city raised $406,000. On September 15, 1892, with the city appropriating tax money for free library service, the library opened. On the first day, 388 names were registered; by the tenth day, 2,160 names were entered. On May 3, 1893, by a special act of the general assembly, the library's name was formerly changed to the Hartford Public Library.

== Modern era ==
The library today operates under the original charter granted to the Hartford Young Men's Institute of 1839. The majority of the library's operating cost now comes from the City of Hartford.

In 1957, the Hartford Public Library moved from the Wadsworth Atheneum into a new building just two blocks away. Designed by Schutz and Goodwin, the 94,448-square-foot (8,774.5 m^{2}) building at 500 Main Street included modern reading and reference rooms.

In 1998, to fully meet the needs of the public, the library completed a 145,000-square-foot (13,500 m^{2}) expansion and renovation at a cost of over $42 million. It was completed in 2007.

In 2022, The Hartford Public Library’s Downtown Library at 500 Main Street temporarily closed after a burst pipe caused significant water damage throughout the building, prompting cleanup and repairs and requiring services and programming to be relocated or adjusted during the closure. After the repairs, the Downtown Library reopened with updated, more modern public-facing spaces and services, including refreshed areas on the first floor designed to better support community programming and access to resources.

== Notable people ==
=== Directors ===
- Caroline Hewins, 1893–1926
- Patricia Berberich
- Louise Blalock, 1994–2008
- Matthew K. Poland, 2009–2016
- Bridget Quinn, 2016–present

=== Notable staff ===
- Tracie D. Hall, former branch manager and current executive director of the American Library Association
- Spencer Shaw, former children's librarian in the 1940s and professor at the University of Washington

== Hartford History Center ==
A unique feature of the Hartford Public Library is its Hartford History Center. It is the library's specialized collection focused on the story of Hartford: its history, its authors, architecture, photographs, pamphlets, periodicals, books, postcards, trade publications, city directories, prints, posters and memorabilia.

The holdings in the Hartford History Center include:

- The institutional archives of the Hartford Public Library
- The archives of the City of Hartford, from 1619 forward. Described by the state archivist as the most complete city records anywhere in the country.
- Noah Webster, the father of the American dictionary's personal pamphlet collection of 93 bound volumes with his notes and comments.
- The Hartford Times photographic collection 1950-1976
- The Tony Bonee photographic collection 1940-1999
- Only complete minutes and records of Hartford's Court of Common Council and Board of Aldermen, 1784–present.
- The City Parks Collection, documenting the growth of the city park system from 1850.
- Records, drawings of the Engineering Department, Public Works Department, and Hartford Housing Authority.
- Marc-Yves Regis photographic record of Hartford's North End.
- Hartford imprints, pamphlets, books, 1777–present.
- Extensive postcard collection of Hartford, 19th-20th centuries.
- Extensive poster collection of Hartford events, performances, happenings and works by Hartford artists.

== See also ==
- Hartford Public Access Television
