= Ilkka-Eemeli Laari =

Finnish snowboarder

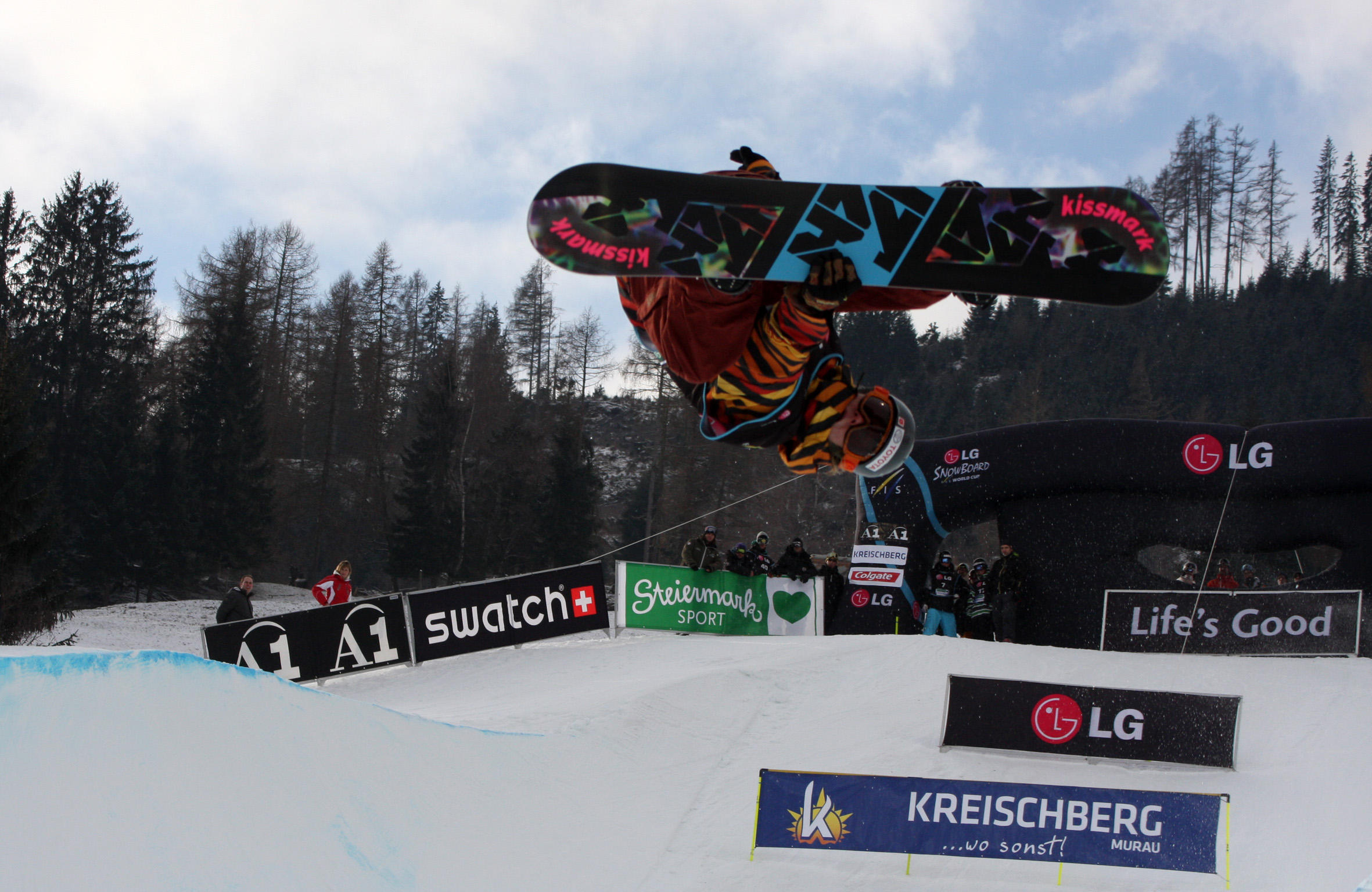

Ilkka-Eemeli Laari (born 29 May 1989) is a Finnish snowboarder. He was a participant at the 2014 Winter Olympics in Sochi.
