= Manuel Pietropoli =

Italian snowboarder (born 1990)

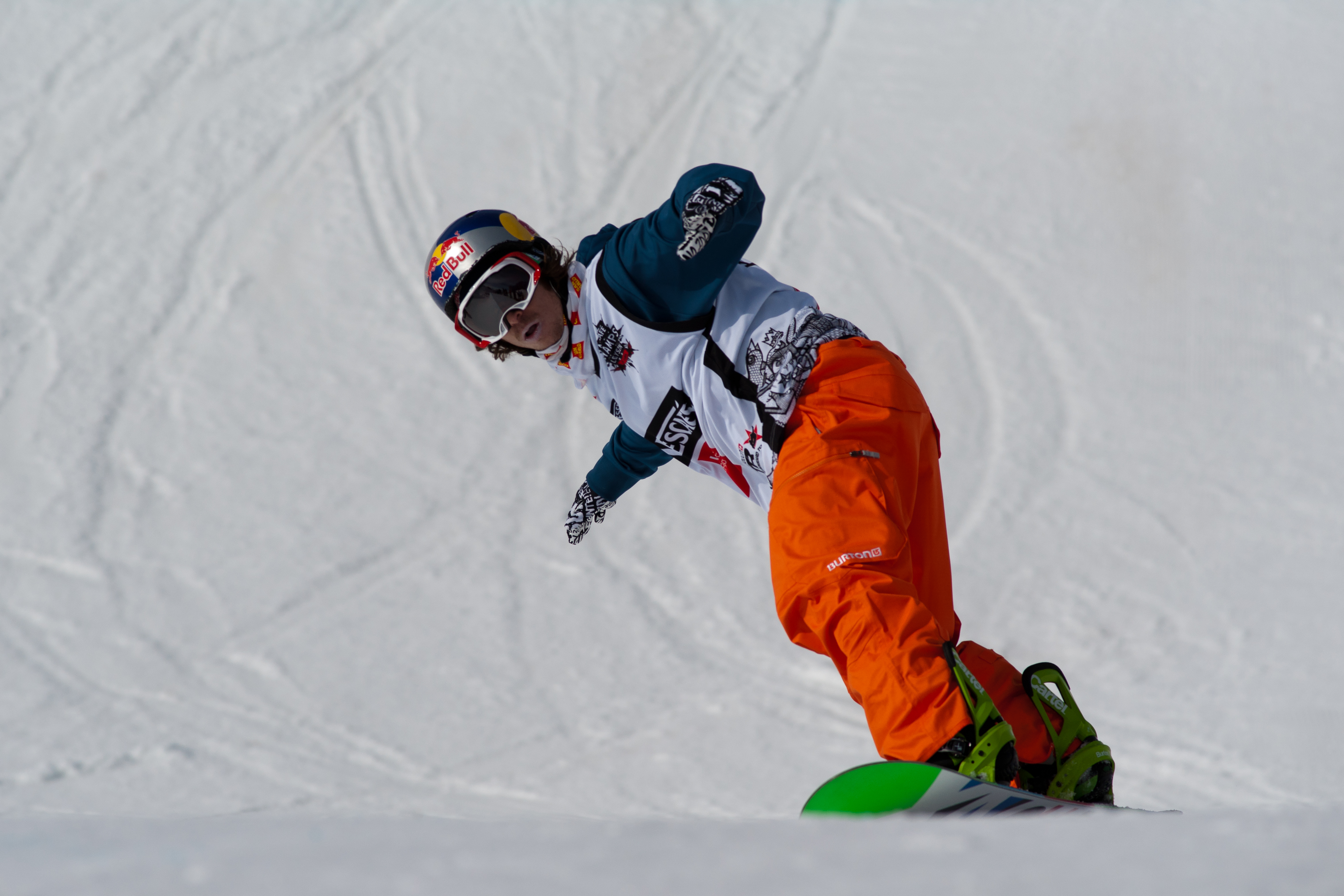
- Pietropoli at 20th Leysin Nescafe Champs, 8 - 13 February 2011

Personal information
- Nationality: Italian
- Born: 30 April 1990 (age 36)

Sport
- Sport: Snowboarding

Manuel Pietropoli (born 30 April 1990 in Desenzano del Garda) is an Italian snowboarder. He competed in the men's halfpipe event at the 2006 Winter Olympics, placing 43rd, and at the 2010 Winter Olympics, placing 39th.
