= Christian Haller (snowboarder) =

Swiss snowboarder

Christian Haller (born 28 October 1989) is a Swiss snowboarder. He competed in FIS Snowboarding World Championships 2013 – Men's halfpipe. He is a participant in 2014 Winter Olympics in Sochi.
