= Markus Malin =

Finnish snowboarder

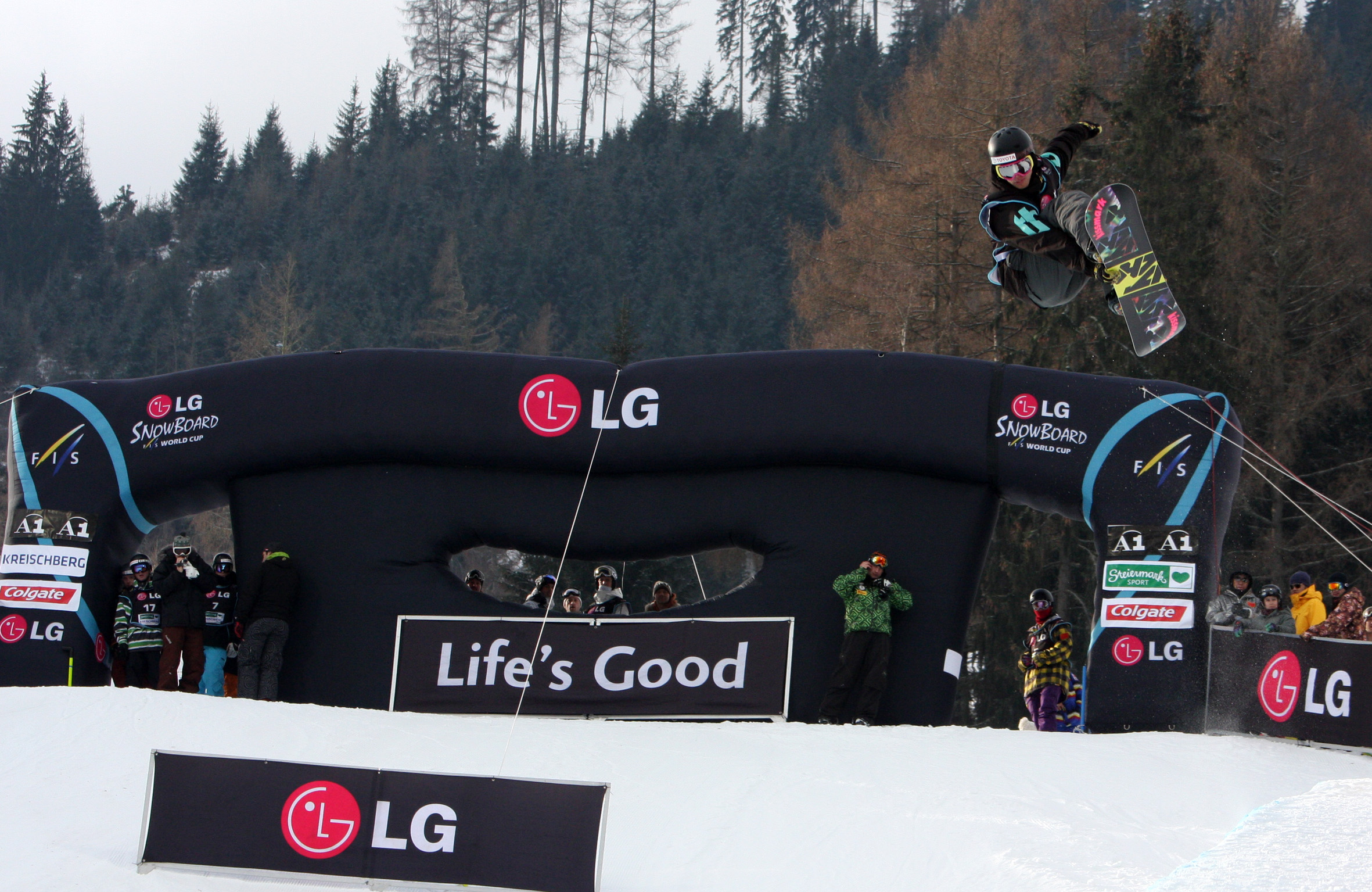
- Malin in 2010

Medal record

Men's Snowboarding

Representing Finland

FIS Snowboarding World Championships
Bronze medal – third place	2011 La Molina	Halfpipe
Bronze medal – third place	2013 Stoneham	Halfpipe

Winter X Games
Bronze medal – third place	2013 Aspen	SuperPipe

Markus Malin (born 28 May 1987) is a Finnish snowboarder. He is a two-time Olympian; representing Finland in the 2018 Winter Olympics in Pyongchang and the 2010 Winter Olympics in Vancouver. At both Olympics, Markus competed in halfpipe, finishing 11th in 2010 and 19th in 2018. Malin won the bronze medal at a 2008–09 World Cup event at Stoneham Mountain Resort in the halfpipe. He also won bronze at the 2010 Canadian Open, a tune-up for the Olympics.

Malin is also a constant competitor at events of the Swatch TTR World Snowboard Tour. After finishing the 08/09 season already in the Top 10 of the Tour, he ended the 09/10 season in World No. 3 of the world ranking list thanks to some good results like a third place at the 5Star Burton Canadian Open and a fourth-place finish at the 6Star O'Neill Evolution and the 6Star Burton US Open.
