= Pop Magazine =

Australian sports magazine

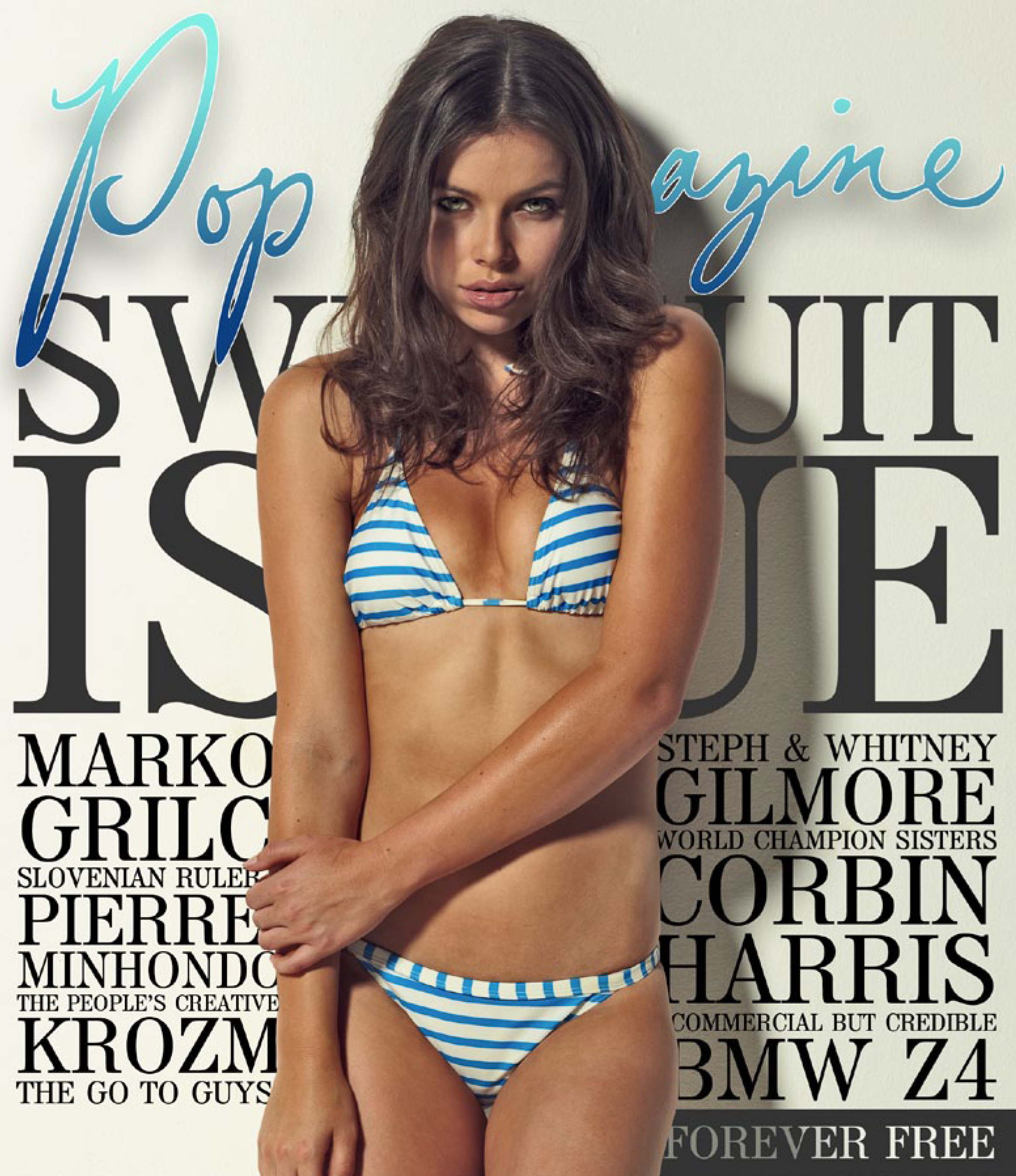
- Pop Issue 14 Cover (December 2009)
- Editor: Dave Keating
- Categories: Sports Magazine
- Frequency: Quarterly
- Circulation: 20,000 per quarter (within Australia)
- Founded: 2005
- Final issue: 2015
- Company: Pop Magazine Pty. Ltd.
- Country: Australia
- Based in: Melbourne
- Language: English

Pop Magazine was a quarterly, free press, action sports magazine, published in Australia from 2005 to 2015. Similar to the American magazine, Blisss, it covered skateboarding, snowboarding and surfing news along with interviews and a lifestyle section covering music, cars, films and opinion pieces from around the world. Each issue of the magazine was available online and in print version distributed only in Australia.

There have been two snowboarding films released under the production and direction of the Pop Magazine owners. There was a potential for a skateboarding film in late 2009.

The magazine was founded by Rick Baker and Dave Keating in 2005. Rick Baker was listed as the editor from 2005 to 2010, and Dave Keating was editing the magazine from 2010 to 2015.

== History ==
Rick Baker founded the magazine with Dave Keating in 2005. The first issues had only interviews and product reviews in them. Since then there has been a large growth in 'lifestyle' content such as fashion editorials, music reviews and opinion pieces.

The magazine has created a great deal of controversy in the snowboarding industry which has had both a positive and negative impact. It is often criticized for airing business issues at a consumer level and has had strong opinions on sections of the industry which have caused ongoing feuds with brands, stores and other media.

On 26 July 2010 Pop announced on its website that it had formed a joint venture with Melbourne-based publisher, Lifelounge. In the press release that was published on the Pop site that day, co-founder Dave Keating said that Lifelounge were "... going to provide Pop with sales support, management support and takeover back-end tasks (accounting, etc.) in addition to helping Rick and I reach our own goals for Pop."

In 2016, Dave Keating posted on the magazine's website that it had closed down.

== Circulation ==
Still considered niche, Pop Magazine circulation grew from 10,000 to 20,000 copies in 2009. Although a national magazine, approximately 40% of readers of Pop Magazine are in the Australian state of Victoria with the magazine having a distinct style particular to the state capital, Melbourne. New South Wales accounts for the second largest readers group accounting for a little over 30% of the readership.

== Style ==
The most distinctive part of Pop Magazine has been its design style. Although keeping most pages sparse and clean, preferring large photos and white space to the often cluttered look used by most editors in the action sports genre. The typography and layout has more in common with business magazines like The Economist and Time magazine than it does with other board sports titles.

== Website ==
Pop Magazine's website launched in December 2005 as a blog that would cover the progression of each issue of the magazine and social events that were occurring. It slowly developed over the first 12 months into a way to deliver time-sensitive news that would be out of date by the following issue of the magazine. This led to a redesign of the site which went live in May 2007. The redesign allowed for more news to be delivered faster, an advertising frame was added to the site and the 'shoutbox'. The shoutbox is a small instant messaging type box which has been hugely popular with the websites audience while also being controversial, abusive, racist, sexist, homophobic and bringing the site into disrepute according to some board-sports industry heads in Australia. Although comments on the site are not edited, according to Rick Baker, any comment that is homophobic or racist is removed.

Pop Magazine''s third website redesign went live in November 2009. The new site design moved away from a 'blog' format to a more professional feel. The page load time decreased significantly and there is greater functionality worked in. There are some early criticisms of the site including some problems when viewing in Internet Explorer 6 and that there is too much movement at the top of the page. However, overall reception has been positive.

The newest version of the site went live in April 2011. This is the biggest change in five years to the site with a complete overhaul of the look, feel and functionality of the site. It has dropped the signature wood background and picked up a more uniformed navigation structure. It is the first version of the site in four years not built using the Word Press platform. The overall look has an obvious influence from the Creative Director at Lifelounge, Luke Lucas. The main criticisms to date have been missing links and broken functionality. The Shoutbox has been rebuilt and has struggled since the relaunch. However the gallery viewer now works better than it ever has.

The site is updated by Dave Keating, Rick Baker and a number of other writers, photographers and filmers.

== Legal controversy ==
Over the years there were several legal threats from companies against Pop Magazine but none of the threats were carried out. Most notably, an article published in issue number 9 about the questionable management of the Victorian ski field at Mt Hotham. The ski field owner, LLC Ltd., sent a legal threat to the magazines owners which they promptly published online. The threat was never followed up by LLC.

== Notable interviews ==
- Danny Davis, Issue 19, July 2011
- Kevin Pearce, Issue 19, July 2011
- Steve Berra, Issue 18, April 2011
- Ashley Gilbertson, Issue 17, December 2010
- Chad Muska, Issue 16, October 2010
- Shaun White, Issue 15, April 2010
- David Thorne, May 2010
- Corbin Harris, Issue 14, December 2009
- Marko Grilc, Issue 14, December 2009
- Tony Hawk, Issue 13, August 2009
- Louie Fountain, Issue 13, August 2009
- Nima Jalali, Issue 12, April 2009
- Rob Dyrdek, Issue 12, April 2009
- Jeremy Jones, Issue 11, December 2008
- Laurie Towner, Issue 11, December 2008
- Dave Rastovich, Issue 10, October 2008
- TJ Schneider, Issue 10, October 2008
- Jon Kooley, Issue 9, April 2008
- Benji Weatherley, Issue 9, April 2008
- Mick Fanning, Issue 8, December 2007
- Robbie Walker, Issue 7, September 2007
- Bobby Martinez, Issue 7, September 2007
- Corey Duffel, Issue 7, September 2007
- Darrell Mathes, Issue 6, July 2007
- Jake Patterson, Issue 6, July 2007
- Arto Saari, Issue 6, July 2007
- Justin Hebbel, Issue 5, April 2007
- Andrew Crawford, Issue 5, April 2007
- Anne Flore-Marxer, Issue 4, December 2006
- David Benedek, Issue 3, July 2006

== Covers ==
- Issue 1, December 2005, Louis Marnell
- Issue 2, April 2006, Mike Martin
- Issue 3, July 2006, Chris Boadle
- Issue 4, October 2006, Matt Horne
- Issue 5, December 2006, Jake McCarthy
- Issue 6, April 2007, Gus St. Leon
- Issue 7, July 2007, Dave Delroy Carr
- Issue 8, December 2007, Charles Bekinsale
- Issue 9, April 2008, Gustav Eden
- Issue 10, October 2008, Robbie Walker
- Issue 11, December 2008, Tim Burdett
- Issue 12, April 2009, Nima Jalali
- Issue 13, August 2009, Tony Hawk
- Issue 14, December 2009, Alyse Cocliff
- Issue 15, May 2010, Shaun White
- Issue 16, October 2010, Chad Muska
- Issue 17, December 2010, Jordan
- Issue 18, April 2011, Steve Berra
- Issue 19, July 2011, Kevin Pearce

== Films ==
Pop had numerous film and T.V credits. The major projects they worked on included two of their own snowboard films, the Trigger Team Movie in 2007 and Two Weeks In in 2008. The films are always distributed free through the stores that stock the magazine as well as being available to download in multiple formats.

In addition to the films, the team at Pop have worked as consultants for one of the largest snowboard contests in the southern hemisphere, the Boost Snow Show, over the last three years. Their role is to keep the contest faithful to the snowboarding culture while also helping to create a television show of the event to play on free to air television.

=== Trigger Team Movie ===
The Trigger Team Movie, released in April 2007, was a low budget "part for part" snowboard film made using the snowboarders sponsored by the iconic Victorian snowboard store, Trigger Brothers. The film featured many of Australia's up and coming professional riders and was well received for a first effort. Criticisms of the film included the skill level of the riding in the film and the length.

=== Two Weeks In ===
Two Weeks In is the largest budget snowboard film ever created by an Australian company. The film, shot over an extremely short period in North America, was wildly successful on release but suffered some of the same criticisms that the Trigger Brothers Movie suffered.

The technology used for creating the film was also a first for an Australian snowboard film. It was filmed using Panasonic HVX-202 cameras along with a Kessler Krane and a unique, purpose built, dolly track setup that was lightweight enough to hike long distances with but still very functional when setup.

The film was distributed free on the cover of the ACP Magazines title, Australian/New Zealand Snowboarding, via Fuel TV and a final version was cover mounted on the issue 10 of Pop Magazine. The film was sponsored by Burton Snowboards, Nitro Snowboards, Grenade Gloves, Neff Headwear, 3CS Outerwear, Panasonic and Rip Curl.
