= Air & Style =

European snowboard contest

The Air & Style is a European snowboard contest first held in Innsbruck, Austria in 1994 and now held annually.

== History ==
Charly Weger and his snowboard photographer friend Andrew Hourmont first started the Air & Style Contest in Innsbruck. They only expected some hundred spectators but more than a few thousand showed up to see a single Straight Jump from each rider. From there on, it developed into one of the most influential snowboard challenges today.

Until 1999, the sponsorship exploded and over 45,000 visitors witnessed the last Air & Style in Innsbruck, when six people died after the show when everybody tried to leave at once and the exits could not funnel the masses. The contest had to move and the Bergisel stadium was renovated. In Seefeld, a place near Innsbruck, five other contests were held until in 2005 it found a new home in Munich, Germany where it expanded its program with Freestyle Motocross. For February 2008, the contest returned to Innsbruck, and will presumably stay there for the following years. Also, three skateboard contests have taken place in Innsbruck and Seefeld, even won by Tony Hawk in 1999. After the end of the International Snowboarding Federation in 2002 the contest joined the newly formed TTR World Tour, and Air & Style Munich is now a 6Star event on the World Tour, whilst Air & Style Innsbruck held a 5-star status until 2009 when it was given a 6-star accreditation. In 2000, the prize money was over 250,000 US dollars (including an Audi A3).

On February 2, 2008, an Air & Style quarterpipe event was held in Innsbruck in addition to the Straight Jump in Munich. Kevin Pearce won the event, which made him the first winner of two Air & Style competitions in one season. The organiser has announced that this event will from now on also be held annually as a TTR 6 Star event.

On December 4, 2010, the first edition of an Air & Style overseas went down in Beijing, China with Sebastien Toutant taking the win. Moving the event to the Bird's Nest Stadium in the following year it will go into its fourth consecutive season in 2013. On December 8, 2012, Mark McMorris and Yuki Kadono landed the first ever triple corks at an Air & Style event.

On February 1 and 2, 2013, the Air & Style celebrated its 20th birthday with a special two-day event. On Friday, the burn Style Session witnessed a return to the roots of snowboarding with legends hitting the jump like Haakonsen, Gimpl, Iguchi, Basich, Rüf and many more. The winner of the burn Style Session was Marko Grilc. On February 2, the birthday Air & Style 6-star event saw the first triple corks landed at an Air & Style in Innsbruck. Eric Willett was the winner of the birthday Air & Style edition.

Select Air & Style events now also feature musical performances be globally and locally renowned artists. The performances are interspersed with the sporting competition cycles. Innsbruck's 2015 snowboard event featured the likes of Sum 41 and Rudimental.

== Chronology ==
=== Big Air competitions ===
- 1. Red Bull Air & Style, January 17. 1994, Innsbruck,

Winner: Reto Lamm

- 2. Red Bull Air & Style, December 19. 1994, Innsbruck,

Winner: Ingemar Backman

- 3. Red Bull Air & Style, December 9. 1995, Innsbruck,

Winner: Terje Håkonsen

- 4. Quiksilver Air & Style, December 7. 1996, Innsbruck,

Winner: Fabien Rohrer

- 5. Quiksilver Air & Style, December 6. 1997, Innsbruck,

Winner: Jim Rippey (Quarterpipe: Terje Håkonsen)

- 6. G-Shock Air & Style, December 5. 1998, Innsbruck,

Winner: Ingemar Backman

- 7. G-Shock Air & Style, December 4. 1999, Innsbruck,

Winner: Stefan Gimpl (Quarterpipe Male: Trevor Andrew, Female: Pauline Richon)

- 8. G-Shock Air & Style, December 9. 2000, Seefeld,

Winner: Stefan Gimpl (Corner Male: Mike Michaelchuck, Female: Pauline Richon)

- 9. Nokia Air & Style, December 15. 2001, Seefeld,

Winner: Stefan Gimpl (Corner Male: Markku Koski, Female: Pauline Richon)

- 10. Nokia Air & Style, December 14. 2002, Seefeld,

Winner: David Benedek

- 11. Nokia Air & Style, December 11./12. 2003, Seefeld,

Winner: Shaun White (Freestyle Motocross: Nate Adams)

- 12. Nokia Air & Style, December 11./12. 2004, Seefeld,

Winner: Shaun White (Freestyle Motocross: Ronnie Renner)

- 13. Nokia Air & Style, December 3. 2005, Munich,

Winner: Hampus Mosesson (Freestyle Motocross: Nate Adams)

- 14. Nokia Air & Style, December 6. 2006, Munich,

Winner: Travis Rice (Rookie Challenge: Mikkel Bang, Freestyle Motocross: Wiley Fullmer)

- 15. Nokia Air & Style, December 1. 2007, Munich, Olympic Stadium (Munich),

Winner: Kevin Pearce (Rookie Challenge : Tim Humphreys, FSX: Daniel Bodin)

- 16. Air & Style, November 29. 2008, Munich,

Cancelled due to last minute sponsorship pullout.

- 17. Billabong Air & Style, December 5. 2009, Innsbruck,

Winner: Marko Grilc (Rookie Challenge: Seppe Smits)

- 18. Oakley & Shaun White Present Air & Style December 4. 2010, Beijing

Winner: Sebastien Toutant

- 19. Billabong Air & Style, February 5. 2011, Innsbruck

Winner: Mark McMorris

- 20. Nike 6.0 Air & Style February 12. 2011, Munich

Winner: Peetu Piiroinen

- 21. Oakley & Shaun White Present Air & Style December 3. 2011, Beijing

Winner: UIrik Badertscher

- 22. Billabong Air & Style, February 4. 2012, Innsbruck

Winner: Peetu Piiroinen

- 23. Oakley and Shaun White Present Air & Style, December 8. 2012, Beijing

Winner: Yuki Kadono

- 24. Billabong Air & Style, February 1–2, 2013, Innsbruck

Winner: Eric Willett

- 25. Air & Style, December 7, 2013, Beijing

Winner: Sven Thorgren

=== Quarterpipe competitions ===
- 1. Billabong Air & Style, February 2. 2008, Innsbruck, Bergisel

Winner: Kevin Pearce (Runner up: Scotty Lago)

- 2. Billabong Air & Style, January 31. 2009, Innsbruck, Bergisel

Winner: Colin Frei

=== Skateboard Competitions ===
- 1. Air & Style Skate Contest, August 19, 1999, Innsbruck, Tivoli

Winner: Tony Hawk

- 2. Air & Style Skate Contest, June 9, 2000, Innsbruck, Hafen

Winner: Lincoln Ueda

- 3. Air & Style Skate Contest, December 15. 2001, Seefeld, Olympic stadium (combined with snowboard contest)

Winner: Sandro Dias
