= Tim Warwood =

Sports commentator

Tim Warwood is a sports commentator and presenter, who presents coverage of the Olympics, often alongside Ed Leigh. He is also a presenter on Ski Sunday, and formerly presented Goalmouth.

During the 2014 Winter Olympics, Warwood, Leigh and Aimee Fuller were criticised for their reaction when Anna Gasser fell during her final run of the snowboarding slopestyle event, which received over 300 complaints.

Probably best known as the BBC's voice of action and adventure sports at the Olympics, alongside Ed Leigh, Warwood has commentated on the Winter Games since 2014 and the Summer Games since 2020. For the Sochi 2014 Olympics, Warwood commentated on the snowboarding and freestyle skiing, alongside Leigh. They returned for the same events for the Pyeongchang 2018 Games. At the delayed Tokyo 2020 Olympics, the pair commentated on the BMX, climbing, skateboarding and surfing events. For Beijing 2022, they again teamed up for the snowboarding and freestyle skiing. For the Paris 2024 Olympics, Leigh and Warwood were again on commentary duties for the BMXing, skateboarding and climbing. The pair reunited once again for the freestyle skiing and snowboarding events at the 2026 Milano Cortina Olympics.

In 2015, Warwood presented Wild and Weird on CBBC alongside Naomi Wilkinson.

Warwood worked a snowboarding consultant on the movie 'Chalet Girl'.
