= Whitelines =

British snowboarding magazine

- Former editors: Chod, Chris Moran, Matt Barr, Ed Leigh, Ed Blomfield
- Categories: Sports magazine
- Founder: Jim Peskett
- Founded: 1995
- Final issue Number: October 2022; 123
- Company: Factory Media, Internet Fusion Group, Double A Media
- Country: United Kingdom
- Based in: Abingdon
- Language: English
- Website: whitelines.com
- ISSN: 1359-0111

Whitelines is an English language legacy print magazine covering snowboarding culture, now published solely online. It was previously published by Permanent Publishing, Factory Media and Any Day Media, and is now under license to Double A Media.

== History ==
Founded in 1995, Whitelines began publishing under Jim Peskett, owner of Permanent Publishing, with former British professional snowboarder Tudor ‘Chod’ Thomas as editor. Its sister skateboarding magazine, Sidewalk Surfer (later renamed simply Sidewalk) shared the same office in Abingdon, Oxfordshire. They were later joined by The Surfer's Path and Dig BMX.

The magazine's name, which plays on freeride snowboarding and drugs culture, was originally spelt out as two words (White Lines). Over the years - for the sake of a simpler logo and the website URL - it has merged to become Whitelines.

At the time of its launch, the only other British snowboard magazine on the shelves was Snowboard UK. Initially something of a fanzine, Whitelines targeted a core readership, differentiating itself from the competition through its forthright opinions and an irreverent sense of humour. Early articles included ‘Freak Speak’ (in which the editor interviewed Oxford's local tramps), a tour of the UK's best rollercoasters and an in depth tutorial on ‘How to drive like The Sweeney’. Tudor ‘Chod’ Thomas now admits that these were partly included for lack of actual snowboarding photos.

The first issue of Whitelines was published in October 1995 and featured Burton-sponsored British snowboarder Chris Moran on the cover. Moran later went on to become one of the magazine's editors, alongside Matt Barr, before the two of them left to found a PR firm. Both have contributed to nearly every issue since.

The final print editor, Ed Blomfield, joined in 2005, and was assisted by Andrew Duthie and Tristan Kennedy. Chod, who by this time focused solely on graphic design, left the magazine in 2007. Other members of the Whitelines editorial team have included the BBC’s Ski Sunday presenter Ed Leigh, filmmaker Samuel McMahon and photographer James McPhail. Whitelines is also credited with kick-starting the photographic career of Nick Hamilton, who worked as a staffer at Permanent Publishing alongside skate lensman Wig Worland before leaving Whitelines to become photo editor at Transworld Snowboarding.

Over the years Whitelines developed from its early fanzine style to a respected snowboard journal, and regularly featured the work of some of the best international snowboard photographers, including Jeff Curtes, Blotto, Andy Wright and Scott Serfas, who contributed alongside staff photographers Matt Georges and Dan Medhurst. Regular columnists have included pro snowboarders Devun Walsh and David Benedek. In 2005, Benedek chose a cover-mounted DVD on Whitelines as the means to distribute his acclaimed film, ‘91 Words for Snow’, in the UK.

Whitelines helped spawn the careers of many of Britain's professional snowboarders, such as Danny Wheeler, Tyler Chorlton, Jenny Jones, Dan Wakeham, Scott McMorris, Dom Harington, Ben Kilner, Billy Morgan, Jamie Nicholls, Katie Ormerod and Mia Brookes. It has also taken riders to many unusual snowboarding destinations, including Greenland, Lebanon, Iran, Russia, Uzbekistan, and Kashmir.

In 2007, the magazine joined Factory Media as part of the merger of three leading specialist sports publishers: Action Sports Media (ASM), Permanent Publishing and 4130 Publishing. It was based in Farringdon, London.

== End of Factory Media ==
The final issue of the traditional format of Whitelines was issue 120, March 2015. Factory Media announced in the summer of 2015 that print production on all their titles would cease - Whitelines would live on in digital-only format via whitelines.com.

After Factory Media became insolvent in late 2018, Internet Fusion Group acquired several of their key titles, including Mpora & Dirt Mountain Bike Magazine. Production resumed on the website with a new editorial team led by Rob McCreath, with Ed Blomfield returning to direct three annual issues; 121, 122 & 123.

== Current Status ==
Internet Fusion Group was disbanded in 2023, with luxury e-tailer BrandAlley acquiring its assets. Today Whitelines continues in its digital-only format, under license to publisher Double A Media.

== Awards ==
In 2007 Ed Blomfield was named New Editor of the Year at the PTC New Journalist Awards.

In 2010 Whitelines won ‘Best Cover’ in the sports category of the Maggies Awards. The winning cover, from issue 82, was shot in Iceland and featured British snowboarder Colum Mytton. It was designed by former WL art director Nick Butterfield.
