= Chemmy Alcott =

English alpine skier

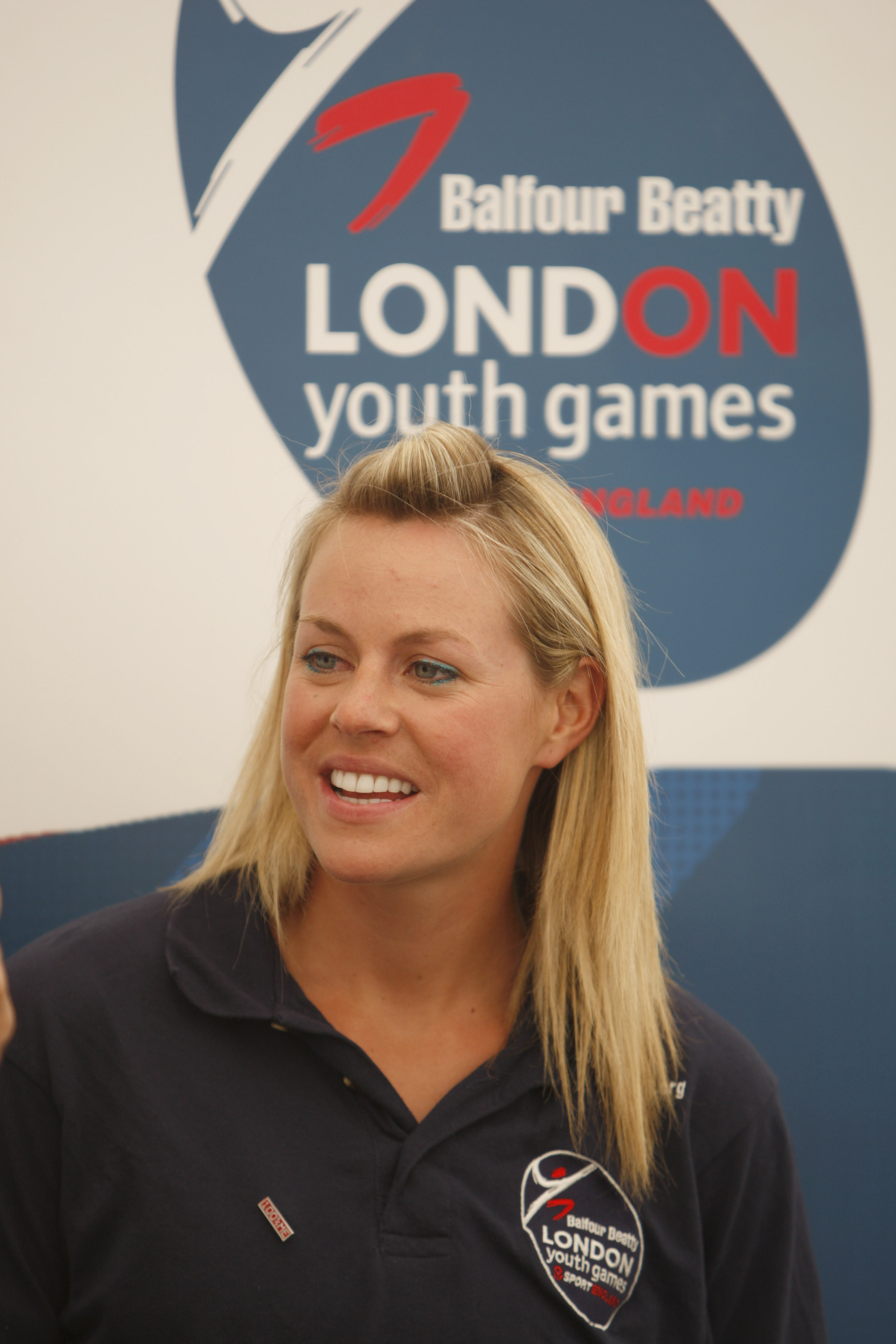
- Alcott in 2009

Personal information
- Full name: Chimene Mary Alcott
- Nickname: Chemmy
- Born: 10 July 1982 (age 44) Hove, East Sussex, England
- Height: 1.69 m (5 ft 7 in)
- Website: ChemmyAlcott.com

Sport
- Country: Great Britain
- Sport: Alpine skiing
- Club: CDC Performance
- Team: Team GB
- Retired: March 2014
Medal record
Women's Alpine skiing
Representing United Kingdom
Senior British National Alpine Ski Championship Titles
Gold medal – first place	2009, 2008, 2007, 2005, 2003, 2002, 1999	Overall
Gold medal – first place	2009, 2008, 2007, 2005, 2003, 2002	Downhill
Gold medal – first place	2009, 2008, 2007, 2003, 2002, 2001	Super G
Gold medal – first place	2009, 2007, 2005, 2003, 2002	Combined/S. Combined
Gold medal – first place	2009, 2008, 2007, 2006, 2005, 2003, 2002	Giant slalom
Gold medal – first place	2009, 2008, 2007, 2006, 2005, 2003	Slalom
Junior British National Alpine Ski Championship Titles
Gold medal – first place	2002	Downhill
Gold medal – first place	2002	Super G
Gold medal – first place	2002, 2001	Giant slalom
Gold medal – first place	2002, 2001	Slalom
European Youth Winter Olympic Festival
Silver medal – second place	1999	Super G
Bronze medal – third place	1999	Giant slalom

Chimene Mary Crawford-Alcott (née Alcott; born 10 July 1982) is an English former World Cup alpine ski racer. She competed in all five disciplines: downhill, super G, giant slalom, slalom and combined.

Alcott competed in four Winter Olympic Games and seven FIS World Championships and has been overall British national champion seven times (1999, 2002, 2003, 2005, 2007, 2008, 2009) and overall British ladies' champion eight times. She retired from international competition following the 2014 season.

== Early life ==
Born in Hove, England, Alcott was named after Sophia Loren's character in the 1961 film El Cid. She started skiing at 18 months old on a family holiday in Flaine, France, and first raced at the age of three.

In 1993, Alcott won the Etoile D'Or French Village Ski Championship, became a member of the British Junior Alpine team in 1994 and won the 1995 Sunday Times Junior Sportswoman of the Year award.

She was a talented athlete, representing Richmond in dry slope skiing, and in tennis at the London Youth Games. She was inducted into the London Youth Games Hall of Fame in 2011.

Aged 11, Alcott broke her neck in a skiing accident, recovering with two vertebrae fused together. She still carries X-rays of the injury so that if she is ever in an accident, the hospital will know not to prise the vertebrae apart. Alcott's career injuries include a dislocated jaw, broken neck, broken back, broken ribs, groin tears, two ACLs, compound tibia/fibula fracture and a broken ankle.

== Career ==
Alcott made her FIS race debut in August 1997 in a Giant slalom event at Coronet Peak, New Zealand. By the end of the 1997/1998 season, she had made her debuts in both the FIS Junior World Championships (Chamonix) and the British National Championships (Tignes), where she won a Silver medal in the giant slalom.

She returned to the Australia/New Zealand Cup in 1998, during the European summer winning the overall championship. The following winter Alcott won silver (super-G) and bronze (giant slalom) medals at the 1999 European Youth Olympics in Štrbské Pleso, Slovakia. In December 1999, Alcott made her World Cup debut in a giant slalom race in Lienz, Austria. The winter of 1999 also saw her crowned World Schools Champion, before adding the World Artificial and Australian Overall Championships to her name in 2000.

At the 2001 Junior World Championships, Alcott finished 8th in the slalom event on her way to 5th in the overall classification. This season also saw Alcott capture the 2001 British Junior title and the Senior British super G title in Saalbach-Hinterglemm, Austria.

=== 2002 and the Salt Lake City Winter Games ===
At 19 years of age, Alcott was ranked in the Top 10 in the world for her age group, while also rising from 683rd to 126th in the downhill rankings over the course of the season.

Her Olympic debut followed in Salt Lake City, Utah. She competed in all of the Alpine disciplines with a best result of 14th position in the combined event.

Later in the season, Alcott returned to the Junior World Championships, finishing in 4th place based on overall championship points (ahead of Lindsey Vonn). In her final British Junior Championships, Alcott won all the titles on offer. She also won British Senior tiles in the giant slalom, super-G and Downhill – claiming the Overall Senior crown for the first time.

=== 2003 ===
In March 2003, Alcott scored her first World Cup points by finishing 27th in a GS event in Innsbruck, Austria.

At the British National Championships in Tignes, France, Alcott won the slalom title for the first time on her way to a clean sweep of all the discipline titles.

=== 2004 ===
Throughout the 2004 World Cup season, Alcott consistently finished in the top-30, including an 11th-place finish in the Lake Louise super G – less than 1.5 seconds behind Renate Goetschl's winning time.

In January 2004, Alcott achieved her first top-10 result, a 9th-place finish in the Cortina downhill. It was the best result by a British woman for more than 30 years, after Gina Hathorn's 9th-place finish in a Slalom at Heavenly Valley in March 1972.

However, a knee ligament injury meant that Alcott was unable to defend her British titles.

=== 2005 ===
At the 2005 World Championships (Santa Caterina, Italy), Alcott finished 19th in the downhill, 22nd in the super-G and 35th in the giant slalom.

At the British National Championships (Meribel, France), Alcott again won the downhill, super-G, and Slalom), also winning the Victrix Ludorum trophy for the Overall Championship for the third time.

=== 2006 and the Torino Winter Games ===
The Torino Winter Olympic Games saw Alcott finish 11th in the downhill, the best Olympic performance by a British female skier since 1968. Alcott was however disqualified from the combined event following the first run of the slalom, where her skis were found to be 0.2 mm narrower than the FIS regulations allowed. She recorded 19th and 22nd-place finishes in the super-G and giant slalom events, respectively.

In the World Cup, Alcott achieved seven top-30 results, with a best finish of 12th place in the super-G at Bad Kleinkirchheim, Austria.

In a weather-disrupted British Championships (Meribel, France), Alcott won the slalom and giant slalom titles. The super-G was cancelled due to adverse weather conditions, as was the Senior downhill. However, it was decided to award the Senior downhill title using the results of the previous day's Junior race, in which Alcott did not compete. This meant that Katrina Head pipped her to the Overall British title, ending Alcott's stranglehold on the Victrix Ludorum trophy.

=== Post-Torino and 2007 ===
A few weeks after the Olympics, Alcott's mother Eve died suddenly, and consequently Alcott decided to take some time away from the sport.

During her break from racing, Alcott underwent surgery on her feet to remove the bunionettes that had been troubling her for years. Alcott's recovery period was extended by two months to five months following a fall during rehabilitation where she re-broke her left foot.

Alcott began the 2007 season with two 13th-place finishes in the first two downhills of the season at Lake Louise and an 11th-place finish in the super-G at the Canadian resort. This was followed by a 7th-place finish in the next event in Reiteralm, Austria, in a Super combined competition, the best result of her career to date. Alcott also finished 9th in the Tarvisio Downhill and had four top-20 results in Giant slalom, qualifying Alcott for her first World Cup Finals (Lenzerheide, Switzerland), where she placed 15th in the giant slalom.

At the British Alpine Championships in Meribel, Alcott won all four titles on offer: the downhill, super G, giant slalom, and slalom events.

=== 2008 ===
Alcott had a relatively poor 2008 World Cup season, except for 16th and 17th-place finishes in the downhill and super combined events at St. Anton and a 16th-place finish in the GS race in Maribor, Slovenia.

At the British Championships in Meribel, France, Alcott won the downhill, super-G, giant slalom, and slalom titles. She also finished second to 19-year-old Louise Thomas in the super combined. The Championships also saw Alcott take the Overall title for the fifth time.

=== 2009 ===
Alcott finished 10th in the opening giant slalom of the season in Sölden, Austria. However, she broke her ankle during training for the next race in Canada, resulting in three months on the sidelines. On her return to action, Alcott finished 15th in the GS at Cortina d'Ampezzo, Italy, and then 21st in the super-G at Garmisch the following weekend.

At the 2009 World Championships, Alcott finished 20th in the-super G. In the following event, the super combined, Alcott had to restart her downhill run after approximately one minute due to a fall by the previous competitor, Frida Hansdotter. On her re-reun, she finished 13th on her way to 17th overall. In the actual Downhill race, Alcott finished 15th, whilst she finished 29th in the giant slalom – the result of a fall during the second run.

Alcott won all five races at the British National Championships (Meribel, France), downhill, super-G, giant slalom, slalom, and super combined titles.

=== 2011 ===
Alcott sustained a double fracture of her right leg when she crashed training for the World Cup downhill race at Lake Louise, Canada, on 2 December 2010, and consequently missed the entire 2011 skiing season.

=== 2012 ===
In Winter/Spring 2012, Alcott competed in ITV1's Dancing on Ice alongside professional skater Sean Rice. They finished fifth place in the competition and were eliminated on 11 March 2012.

=== 2018 ===
In February, Alcott beat Graham Bell in a head-to-head slalom race filmed for BBC's Ski Sunday. In November Chemmy Alcott was interviewed by The Telegraph about her views on the gender gap in skiing and why so few women go skiing.

== Broadcasting ==
During her injury lay-off at the start of the 2009 World Cup season, Alcott joined Matt Chilton in the British Eurosport commentary box as guest commentator for several of the women's World Cup events.

Alcott has previously appeared on Channel 4's World Cup Skiing programme, with a regular feature called Fit to Ski, in which she demonstrated different exercise techniques.

In January 2012, it was announced that Alcott would take part in the ITV programme Dancing on Ice. There was some concern that this would put at risk her rehabilitation from the fractured leg she sustained in December 2010.

In 2018, she was part of the BBC's team providing coverage on the 2018 Winter Olympics. Alcott told The Ski Podcast that "to have the opportunity to sit next to a legend like Clare Balding, and to be taken under her wing, was amazing. I owe Clare so much."

Alcott joined the presenting team of Ski Sunday in 2021. She continued to work for the BBC at the Beijing 2022 and Milano Cortina 2026 Olympics, analysing and reporting from the skiing events. During Lindsey Vonn's accident, Alcott broke down in tears on air, but continued broadcasting because "the story needed to be told".

In September 2026, the BBC announced they were cancelling 'Ski Sunday'. In October 2026, Alcott confirmed that she is planning to film a pilot for a new show that she is hoping to find funding for.

== Personal life ==
In June 2008, Alcott climbed Mount Kilimanjaro along with fellow ski racers Julia Mancuso and Laurenne Ross, and Alcott's then boyfriend Mark Weaver. The climb raised US$30,000 for international humanitarian organisation Right to Play.

As of January 2009, she lives in Hampton Court, England. Chemmy is also a motor sport fan; has an MSA Competition Licence and competed in the 2012 Silverstone Classic Celebrity Challenge race.

In October 2013, the BBC reported that Alcott was to marry her boyfriend, and fellow alpine ski racer, Dougie Crawford. They married in 2014; she now uses the name Chemmy Crawford-Alcott.

Alcott suffered a collapsed lung in August 2026 after jumping from a platform five metres above Lake Annecy.

== Results ==
=== World Cup Top-10 finishes ===
Season	Date	Location	Discipline	Result	Notes
2010	18 December 2009	Val-d'Isère, France	Super combined	9th	
2009	25 October 2008	Sölden, Austria	Giant slalom	10th	
2007	3 March 2007	Tarvisio, Italy	Downhill	9th	
2007	15 December 2006	Reiteralm, Austria	Super Combined	7th	
2004	18 January 2004	Cortina d'Ampezzo, Italy	Downhill	9th	

=== World Cup Season standings ===
Season	Overall		Downhill		Slalom		Giant slalom		Super-G		Combined	
Season	Rank	(Pts)	Rank	(Pts)	Rank	(Pts)	Rank	(Pts)	Rank	(Pts)	Rank	(Pts)
2011*	injured 2 Dec 2010, out for season											
2010	32	(175)	41	(10)	−	(−)	26	(44)	18	(68)	8	(53)
2009	55	(117)	38	(20)	−	(−)	28	(50)	36	(25)	25	(22)
2008	63	(76)	39	(26)	−	(−)	28	(25)	42	(9)	28	(16)
2007	32	(249)	27	(84)	−	(−)	21	(76)	33	(37)	13	(52)
2006	60	(82)	51	(11)	−	(−)	−	(−)	29	(66)	38	(5)
2005	78	(30)	42	(12)	−	(−)	−	(−)	43	(16)	−	(-)
2004	51	(139)	27	(68)	−	(−)	39	(21)	39	(50)	−	(-)
2003	115	(4)	−	(−)	−	(−)	−	(−)	50	(4)	−	(-)

=== Major championships ===
Event	Date	Location	Discipline	Result
XXI Olympic Winter Games	26 February 2010	Whistler Creekside, Canada	Slalom	27
XXI Olympic Winter Games	24 February 2010	Whistler Creekside, Canada	Giant slalom	DNF
XXI Olympic Winter Games	20 February 2010	Whistler Creekside, Canada	Super-G	20
XXI Olympic Winter Games	18 February 2010	Whistler Creekside, Canada	Super combined	11
XXI Olympic Winter Games	17 February 2010	Whistler Creekside, Canada	Downhill	13
2009 World Championships	12 February 2009	Val-d'Isère, France	Giant slalom	29
2009 World Championships	9 February 2009	Val-d'Isère, France	Downhill	15
2009 World Championships	6 February 2009	Val-d'Isère, France	Super combined	17
2009 World Championships	3 February 2009	Val-d'Isère, France	Super-G	20
2007 World Championships	13 February 2007	Åre, Sweden	Giant slalom	27
2007 World Championships	11 February 2007	Åre, Sweden	Downhill	DNF
2007 World Championships	9 February 2007	Åre, Sweden	Super combined	DNF
2007 World Championships	6 February 2007	Åre, Sweden	Super-G	28
XX Olympic Winter Games	24 February 2006	Sestriere, Italy	Giant slalom	22
XX Olympic Winter Games	20 February 2006	San Sicario, Italy	Super-G	19
XX Olympic Winter Games	18 February 2006	Sestriere, Italy	Combined	DSQ
XX Olympic Winter Games	15 February 2006	San Sicario, Italy	Downhill	11
2005 World Championships	11 February 2005	Santa Caterina, Italy	Slalom	DNS
2005 World Championships	8 February 2005	Santa Caterina, Italy	Giant slalom	35
2005 World Championships	6 February 2005	Santa Caterina, Italy	Downhill	19
2005 World Championships	4 February 2005	Santa Caterina, Italy	Combined	DNF
2005 World Championships	30 January 2005	Santa Caterina, Italy	Super-G	22
2003 World Championships	13 February 2003	St. Moritz, Switzerland	Giant slalom	25
2003 World Championships	9 February 2003	St. Moritz, Switzerland	Downhill	33
XIX Olympic Winter Games	22 February 2002	Park City, US	Giant slalom	30
XIX Olympic Winter Games	20 February 2002	Deer Valley, USA	Slalom	DNF
XIX Olympic Winter Games	17 February 2002	Snowbasin, USA	Super-G	28
XIX Olympic Winter Games	14 February 2002	Snowbasin, USA	Combined	14
XIX Olympic Winter Games	12 February 2002	Snowbasin, USA	Downhill	32
2001 World Championships	19 January 2001	St. Anton, Austria	Super-G	36
1999 World Championships	13 February 1999	Vail, USA	Slalom	DNF
1999 World Championships	11 February 1999	Vail, USA	Giant slalom	33

=== Junior World championships ===
Event	Date	Location	Discipline	Result
2002 Junior World Championships	February/March 2002	Sella Nevea, Italy	Overall (Points)	4
2002 Junior World Championships	3 March 2002	Ravascletto, Italy	Giant slalom	13
2002 Junior World Championships	1 March 2002	Sella Nevea, Italy	Slalom	22
2002 Junior World Championships	28 February 2002	Tarvisio, Italy	Super-G	DNF
2002 Junior World Championships	29 February 2002	Tarvisio, Italy	Downhill	12
2001 Junior World Championships	February 2001	Verbier, Switzerland	Overall (Points)	5
2001 Junior World Championships	10 February 2001	Verbier, Switzerland	Giant slalom	19
2001 Junior World Championships	10 February 2001	Verbier, Switzerland	Slalom	8
2001 Junior World Championships	7 February 2001	Verbier, Switzerland	Super-G	21
2001 Junior World Championships	6 February 2001	Verbier, Switzerland	Downhill	18
2000 Junior World Championships	26 February 2000	Lac Beauport, Canada	Slalom	DNF
2000 Junior World Championships	25 February 2000	Stoneham, Canada	Giant slalom	21
2000 Junior World Championships	22 February 2000	Mt. St. Anne, Canada	Super-G	26
1998 Junior World Championships	1 March 1998	Chamonix, France	Giant slalom	72
1998 Junior World Championships	28 February 1998	Chamonix, France	Slalom	56
1998 Junior World Championships	27 February 1998	Chamonix, France	Super-G	DNS

== Other achievements ==
- London Youth Games
  - Hall of Fame member (Class of 2011)

== CDC Performance ==
CDC Performance, or just CDC (Chemmie Duggie Crawford) is an alpine ski team for mainly children which hosts ski camps for many different races.
