= Mt. Baker Legendary Banked Slalom =

Mt. Baker Banked Slalom, also known as the Legendary Banked Slalom (LBS), is a snowboarding contest held annually since 1985 at Mt. Baker Ski Area, in Washington State, United States. The LBS is regarded as the predecessor to the boardercross event, and has been won by some of the biggest names in the history of snowboarding. The winner receives a Duct Tape trophy and an embroidered Carhartt jacket. Terje Håkonsen is the winningest male pro snowboarder with 7 trophies over a 17-year period; the winningest female pro snowboarder is Maëlle Ricker with 7 consecutive wins from 2007 to 2013.

== History ==
The first race was held in 1985, organized by Bob Barci and Tom Sims. With only 14 riders at the top of the 500-foot-long (150 m) course, they raced through 15 gates with only a few spectators present. The decision to put on the banked slalom at Mt. Baker came about because it was one of the few ski areas in North America that welcomed snowboarders at that time.

== Winners ==
Presented below are the Pro Men and Pro Women champions per the LBS Honor Roll.

Year	Pro Men	Pro Women
1985	Tom Sims (USA)	
1986	Shaun Palmer (USA)	
1987	Shaun Palmer (USA)	Amy Howat (USA)
1988	Craig Kelly (USA)	Marcella Dobis (USA)
1989	Rob Morrow (USA)	Jennifer Dolecki (CAN)
1990	Don Schwartz (CAN)	Amy Howat (USA)
1991	Craig Kelly (USA)	Jean Higgins (USA)
1992	Ross Rebagliati (CAN)	Karleen Jeffery (CAN)
1993	Craig Kelly (USA)	Karleen Jeffery (CAN)
1994	Paul Ferrel (USA)	Weegee McAuliffe (USA)
1995	Terje Håkonsen (NOR)	Rachel Deryckx (USA)
1996	Terje Håkonsen (NOR)	Karleen Jeffery (CAN)
1997	Rob Morrow (USA)	Karleen Jeffery (CAN)
1998	Terje Håkonsen (NOR)	Karleen Jeffery (CAN)
1999	Matt Goodwill (USA)	Karleen Jeffery (CAN)
2000	Terje Håkonsen (NOR)	Victoria Jealouse (CAN)
2001	Temple Cummins (USA)	Barrett Christy (USA)
2002	Xavier de Le Rue (FRA)	Manuela Pesko (SUI)
2003	Terje Håkonsen (NOR)	Tanja Frieden (SUI)
2004	Terje Håkonsen (NOR)	Stacy Thomas (USA)
2005	Event cancelled	
2006	Temple Cummins (USA)	Victoria Jealouse (CAN)
2007	Lucas DeBari (USA)	Maëlle Ricker (CAN)
2008	Temple Cummins (USA)	Maëlle Ricker (CAN)
2009	Nate Holland (USA)	Maëlle Ricker (CAN)
2010	Temple Cummins (USA)	Maëlle Ricker (CAN)
2011	Harry Kearney (USA)	Maëlle Ricker (CAN)
2012	Terje Håkonsen (NOR)	Maëlle Ricker (CAN)
2013	Seth Westcott (USA)	Maëlle Ricker (CAN)
2014	Harry Kearney (USA)	Marie-France Roy (CAN)
2015	Event cancelled	
2016	Mathieu Crepel (FRA)	Maëlle Ricker (CAN)
2017	Nils Mindnich (USA)	Stephanie Haines (CAN)
2018	Josh Dirksen (USA)	Mariah Dugan (USA)
2019	Seth Wescott (USA)	Audrey Hebert (CAN)
2020	Seth Wescott (USA)	Audrey Hebert (CAN)
2021	Event cancelled	
