= Shawn Orecchio =

American snowboarder

Shawn Orecchio (born 1972) is a retired professional snowboarder He is also the founder of the US Open of Mountain Biking, the Diablo Mountain Bike Park, Status Snowboard Company USA, and several notable ski resort terrain parks.

Summers found Orecchio mountain biking in North Lake Tahoe, as part of an off-season fitness regimen. His interest in mountain biking developed quickly, and by 2003, Orecchio founded, designed and managed the Diablo Freeride Park for mountain biking, and soon after founded the US Open of Mountain Biking. In 2007, 2008, and 2009, the US Open of Mountain Biking was ranked as one of the top-20 mountain bike events in the world.

In 2001, Orecchio designed the Santa Cruz Jib Park at Mountain Creek ski resort in Vernon, New Jersey, Eastern North America’s largest snowboard terrain park. The terrain park was later renamed "Uncommon Ground". In 2003, Orecchio also founded an innovative terrain park feature fabrication center called JibLab. One year after the creation of JibLab, Transworld Snowboarding ranked Mountain Creek as North America’s #3 Terrain Park in North America for Best Jib Variety. By 2006, The US Olympic finalists for halfpipe discipline were named at Orecchio’s JibLab.

The resort was known for its massive area and proximity to New York City, as well as for its famous "Playboy Club", "VV/GG", an early snowboard education center, enjoyed renown as North America's largest snowboard school and training center for the entirety of the 1980s.

In 2006, Orecchio was named Director of Freestyle Terrain and Product Development at Jack Frost/Big Boulder resorts in The Poconos of northeastern Pennsylvania; by the 2007-08 Winter season, Orecchio took a sabbatical from his long Snow Board Parks industry tenure and returned to his snowboarding roots, training and riding each day at the resort of his youth. On January 29, 2011, Orecchio returned to professional snowboard competition achieving a 5th place result in the Boardercross discipline at Boreal Mountain Resort in North Lake Tahoe. Orecchio is also credited with developing the Indycross Giant Slalom mountain biking concept and competition discipline first unveiled at Diablo Freeride Park in August
