= Washington State Department of Transportation =

Government agency in Washington (state), United States

- Headquarters in Olympia

Department overview
- Formed: September 21, 1977
- Preceding agencies: Washington State Department of Highways; Washington State Aeronautics Commission; Washington State Toll Bridge Authority; Washington State Canal Commission
- Type: Department of transportation
- Jurisdiction: State of Washington
- Headquarters: 310 Maple Park Avenue SE Olympia, Washington, U.S.; 47.034700°N 122.897661°W
- Employees: 6,900 (2024)
- Annual budget: $11.505 billion (2023–2025)
- Department executive: Julie Meredith, Secretary of Transportation
- Child Department: Washington State Ferries
- Website: wsdot.wa.gov

The Washington State Department of Transportation (WSDOT) is a governmental agency that constructs, maintains, and regulates the use of transportation infrastructure in the U.S. state of Washington. Established in 1905, it is led by a secretary and overseen by the governor. WSDOT is responsible for more than 20,000 lane-miles of roadway, nearly 3,000 vehicular bridges and 524 other structures. This infrastructure includes rail lines, state highways, state ferries (considered part of the highway system) and state airports.

== History ==
=== Department of Highways ===
WSDOT was founded as the Washington State Highway Board and the Washington State Highways Department on March 13, 1905, when then-governor Albert Mead signed a bill that allocated $110,000 to fund new roads that linked the state. The State Highway Board was managed by State Treasurer, State Auditor, and Highway Commissioner Joseph M. Snow and the Board first met on April 17, 1905, to plan the 12 original state roads. The first state highway districts, each managed by a District Engineer, were established in 1918. During this period, the construction of highways began.

In 1921, the State Highway Board was replaced by the Washington Highway Committee and the Washington State Highways Department became a division of the Washington State Department of Public Works. The first gas tax (1¢ per gallon) was levied and Homer Hadley started planning a pontoon bridge across Lake Washington, which would later become the Lacey V. Murrow Memorial Bridge, which opened on July 2, 1940. In 1923, the State Highways Department separated from the Public Works Department and organized the first official system of highways, Washington's state road system. In 1926, the U.S. government approved the U.S. route system, which connected the country by road. 11 U.S. Routes entered Washington at the time. Later in 1929, the Highway Committee was merged with the State Highways Department. The Lake Washington Floating Bridge and the original Tacoma Narrows Bridge opened in 1940. The Tacoma Narrows Bridge collapsed because of winds on November 7 that year, earning it the name Galloping Gertie.

The Washington State Highway Commission was formed in 1951. On June 29, 1956, President Dwight Eisenhower signed the Federal Aid Highway Act of 1956, which started the Interstate Highway System. Originally, two Interstates entered Washington; most work was not completed until the 1970s. In 1964, the state highways were renumbered to the current system. Metro Transit was created in 1972 and work on highways rapidly continued. The North Cascades Highway (SR 20) was completed in 1972, and the first HOV lanes in Washington were installed on SR 520 that same year.

=== Department of Transportation ===
A combined state department of transportation was proposed in the mid-1960s and gained the support of Governor Dan Evans. Charles Prahl, who resigned as head of the Department of Highways, criticized the Evans administration's proposal to create a transportation "superagency" and the prioritization of rapid transit in plans for the urban transportation system of Seattle. The Washington State Department of Transportation was authorized by the state legislature and assumed the responsibilities of several agencies on September 21, 1977. William A. Bulley, the existing Director of Highways, was appointed as the state's first Secretary of Transportation to lead the new agency, which had absorbed state departments that had overseen highways, toll bridges, aeronautics, canals, and community development. The State Highway Commission was renamed to the Washington State Transportation Commission, with its first meeting taking place on September 21, 1977.

On February 13, 1979, the western pontoons of the Hood Canal Bridge were swept away by a wind storm. In 1980, Mount St. Helens erupted and caused damage to many state highways, mainly SR 504. The Hood Canal Replacement Bridge opened on October 3, 1982, and the Lacey V. Murrow Memorial Bridge collapsed on November 25, 1990.

In 1991, a smaller renumbering of state highways occurred. The renumbering produced some new highways and either realigned or removed highways from the system. In 1996, Sound Transit was formed and in the same year, the Washington State Transportation Commission adopted its first 20-year transportation plan. Throughout the 1990s, WSDOT and ODOT partnered with Amtrak to create a train service that went from Canada to Oregon, which later became the Amtrak Cascades. The 2001 Nisqually earthquake damaged most state highways around the Seattle metropolitan area and most of the budget was turned over to the Puget Sound region to help rebuild and repair roads and bridges.

Since the beginning of the 21st century, WSDOT has been tasked with rebuilding and renovating aging portions of the highway system across the state. Several sections with poor conditions required emergency repairs in early 2023, including a large hole in an offramp to SR 99 in Seattle and broken concrete panels on I-5 in Everett and I-90 near Issaquah. WSDOT has also been tasked with replacement of 437 fish barriers, mainly outdated culvert designs, in Western Washington to comply with a federal court order to restore salmon runs that are protected by Native American treaty rights. As of 2024, 146 of the barriers had been replaced or rehabilitated; the program is expected to cost $7.8 billion by 2030. As of 2025, a budget shortfall is leading transportation officials to become scared of what they may mean for future repaving, repairs, or emergency issues.

== Administration ==
WSDOT region map

WSDOT divides the state into six regions: the Olympic, Northwest, Southwest, North Central, South Central, and Eastern. The Northwest Region is subdivided into three more regions, which are King County, Snohomish County, and Baker (Whatcom, Skagit, Island, and San Juan counties).

WSDOT is overseen by the Governor of Washington. The governor appoints a Secretary of Transportation who is confirmed by the state legislature. The last Secretary of Transportation was Lynn Peterson, who served until February 5, 2016, when her appointment under Governor Jay Inslee was rejected by the Washington State Senate during the confirmation process. January 2025 marked Gov. Ferguson's appointment of Julie Meredith as Washington's next Transportation Secretary. She has worked for the Department for 36 years, previously serving as the assistant secretary for urban mobility, access and megaprograms. Meredith will be tasked to navigate the extensive financial gap. Deputy Secretary of Transportation Roger Millar was appointed as Acting Secretary of Transportation by Governor Inslee on February 10, 2016.

=== Operations ===
WSDOT has approximately 1,500 positions for winter operations, which includes snow plow crews for the major mountain passes crossed by state highways. In the Snoqualmie Pass area, the agency has avalanche control crews that use remote sensors and triggers to clear snow buildup before it encroaches on the highway. The crews previously used an M60 tank and howitzers—both loaned from the U.S. Army—along with a mechanical tram carrying explosives to trigger avalanches; the tank was decommissioned in 2018 and the howitzer was replaced by the remote system in 2025.

== Ferries ==
WSDOT manages the official state level ferry service in Washington. WSDOT's ferry service for the Salish Sea, called Washington State Ferries, is the largest in the United States and third largest in the world. Ferries had been in the Puget Sound since the 1950s. There are 10 routes and 22 ferries currently operating.

== Buses ==
WSDOT began operating the Travel Washington intercity Bus program in 2007. There are currently four lines:

- Grape Line, from Pasco to Walla Walla, operated by Bellair Charters and Airporter.
- Dungeness Line, from Port Angeles to Seattle, operated by Greyhound Lines.
- Apple Line, from Omak to Ellensburg via Wenatchee, operated by Northwestern Stage Lines.
- Gold Line, from Kettle Falls to Spokane, operated by Bellair Charters and Airporter.

== Current projects ==
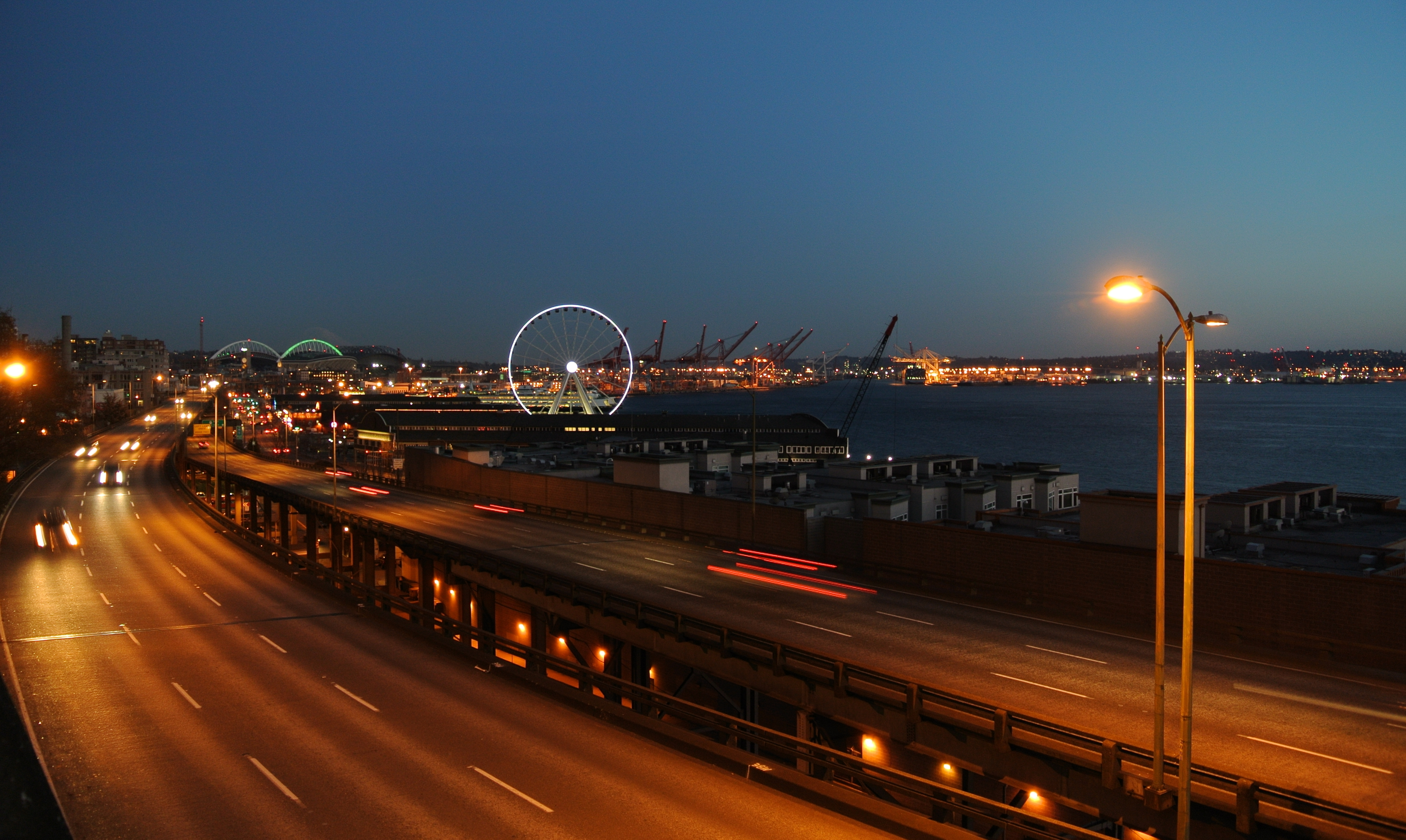
The Alaskan Way Viaduct pictured in 2013

As of 2008, there were about 250 projects that were being planned or constructed by WSDOT. Some of the most notable projects that were recently finished include the Tacoma Narrows Bridge project, which built a second bridge adjacent to the original bridge, the SR 167 HOT lanes project, which added HOT lanes over SR 167's existing HOV lanes from the SR 18 area to 180th Street, and the I-5 HOV extensions project, which extended the HOV lanes in Everett from the I-5/SR 99/SR 526/SR 527 interchange to the I-5/US 2/SR 529 Spur interchange.

As of 2025, the department has been testing out new telematics. Anonymized GPS and sensor data collect data from cars and phones that have been revealing real-time driver behavior. In the short amount of time these have been in use, the trends have exposed that phone use is closer to 30% than what was previously believed to be 10%.

There are plans to have new tolls open to truckers on the Interstate 5 corridor as it remains congested. This new development is hoping to make travel more efficient to the Seattle and Tacoma ports.

Some of the main projects in the future include the Alaskan Way Viaduct replacement tunnel, the replacement of the SR 520 Evergreen Point floating bridge, the ferry terminals, the I-5 Crash barrier project and SR 704.

== Accidents and deaths ==
Based on numbers between 2020 and late-2023, approximately 1,340 accidents or crashes annually occur in WSDOT construction zones. The number of WSDOT employees that have died in construction zone accidents since 1950 is recorded at 61.

== See also ==
- United States Department of Transportation
- State highways in Washington
