= Monument Snowboards =

Monument Snowboards is a snowboard company based in the Mid-Atlantic founded in late 2001 by David Tran. It was first started as a house brand for Capitol Board Room (originally owned by Chad and Mike Ellis), a snowboard shop based in Virginia, then emerged into its own brand with a full team by 2003.

The original Capitol Board Room Snowboard/Skateboard/Surf shop was open from 1996-1998 under the Ellis brothers. Tran kept the web site up as part of his portfolio after the shop closed. After a trip out west in 1999, owner Dave Tran had all of his equipment stolen from Dulles Airport ($2,500 value) from United Airlines on his way out to Steamboat Springs, Colorado. He then decided to start up the online Capitol Board Room after talking with Chad Ellis and getting his blessing to use the name ^{1}.

Two years after starting up Capitol Board Room, Tran started Monument Snowboards. After picking up local Virginia rider, Jeremy Cline from Massanutten Mountain, Virginia, the company started to move from a generic house brand to its own entity by adding team members who worked at June Mountain, California, for the 2005 Transworld Snowboarding Magazine Team Challenge. In 2005, several team members were featured in DFI's snowboard video, "the over surveillance." In 2006, the company put a video called "Clouds Happen." For 2007, the company filmed and edited another film short called "Frontcountry."

Ethan Deiss is featured in 2009's "Think Positive" (Role Model Productions), putting him in the spotlight with "Jibber of the Year" mentions from Transworld Magazine.

Monument Snowboards has participated in numerous events including 2005 Transworld Snowboarding Team Challenge, and the 2006, 2007, 2008, and 2009 Snowboarder Magazine SuperPark event.

Monument snowboards have been featured in the Washington Post, and numerous international publications.

== Links ==
- Monument Snowboards website
- Capitol Board Room website
- Washington Post Sunday Source Article: 1/14/07

^{1}Ontap Magazine Article - Background of Monument Snowboards

- DC Snowboarding Scene
- TimeOut NY Product Showcase
- Southmain Interview with Jeremy Cline
- Rocktown Weekly interview with Jeremy Cline
- Jeremy Cline Deaflympics Results
- Doug Mercer profile on Northwave
- K5 Board Shop News with Doug Mercer Update
- Doug Mercer Video Clip on SnowboardRevolution.com
- Surfrider Foundation - DC Surfrider Raises $4,500 for Tsunami Relief
- Press Release on Snowboard Magazine 11.16.06
- Press Release on Transworld Snowboarding
- Monument Snowboards on video.google.com
