= Ed Leigh =

British sports presenter and commentator

Ed Leigh (born 15 July 1975) is a British sports presenter, snowboarder and commentator.

== Broadcasting career ==
Ed Leigh is part of the presenting team for the BBC2 show Ski Sunday and regularly works for Red Bull TV on a host of live events from skateboarding and BMX, through to Enduro and mountain biking. He also worked with Whisper Films as the live anchor for Sail GP's first two seasons of international coverage.

Probably best known as the BBC's voice of action and adventure sports at the Olympics, Leigh has commentated on the Winter Games since 2006 and the Summer Games since 2012. At the Turin 2006 Winter Olympics, Leigh commentated on the snowboarding events. He returned four years later to commentate on the snowboarding and freestyle skiing at the Vancouver 2010 Games. At the London 2012 Summer Olympics, Leigh commentated on the beach volleyball with Matt Chilton and the BMX cycling. For the Sochi 2014 Olympics, Leigh returned for the snowboarding and freestyle skiing, for the first time alongside Tim Warwood. They returned for the same events for the Pyeongchang 2018 Games. At the delayed Tokyo 2020 Olympics, Leigh commentated on the BMX, climbing, skateboarding and surfing events. For Beijing 2022, Leigh was once again alongside Warwood for the snowboarding and freestyle skiing. For the Paris 2024 Olympics, Leigh and Warwood were again on commentary duties for the BMXing, skateboarding and climbing. The pair reunited once again for the freestyle skiing and snowboarding events at the 2026 Milano Cortina Olympics.

Leigh got his first regular work on Channel 4's RTS award-winning series Freesports On 4 covering action sports events around the world. Leigh has also worked on Ed vs. Spencer for Sky 1 and My Life As An Animal for BBC3.

Having worked as editor of Whitelines Snowboard Magazine, Leigh's TV career started presenting Trailer Park on Turners CNX channel CNX, alongside Christian Stevenson.

After doing the voice over for the Extreme Sports Channel's Gumball 3000 series in 2004, he followed the Rally as a hitch hiker/presenter for 2005 and Gumball 2006: Around the world in 8 days.

In 2007, Leigh became co-presenter of the BBC's Ski Sunday series with Graham Bell after his commentary at the 2006 Winter Olympics. Leigh has commentated on snowboarding events at the all subsequent Winter Olympics.

Leigh presented a spin off show from Ski Sunday, High Altitude, which ran for the winter of 2009 on BBC2, with Graham Bell.

During the 2021 season in Laax, Leigh dislocated his knee cap and broke his tibia.

Leigh now works with the Natural Selection Tour, assessing which athletes would be best suited to compete based on video submissions.

== Other appearances ==
In spring 2009, Leigh appeared on My Life as an Animal on BBC Three where he lived with dogs for a week.

== Professional career ==
Previous to his broadcast career, Leigh's CV included professional snowboarding, journalism, event management, cleaning mega yachts and windsurf instructing. However, in 1997, after a chance meeting in London, he centred his efforts on Laughing Gear, a commentary and cabaret company set up with friend Christian Stevenson.

Leigh started his snowboarding career working in Chalford based snowboard shop, Noahs Ark. After spending five years snowboarding in the resort of Val d'Isère a knee injury forced him to take a season off and he was offered a job as teaboy at White Lines snowboarding magazine, which he had been contributing to on a freelance basis. Six months later he was editor of the magazine which opened the doors to other media opportunities.
