= Sam Fonteyn =

English composer and pianist (1925–1991)

Sam Fonteyn (born Samuel Soden; 1925–1991) was an English composer and pianist, whose most significant output was for the Boosey & Hawkes Music Library, for which he composed and recorded many works.

Most are short character pieces for the piano with colourful titles indicating the images the pieces are meant to conjure. Others are bright orchestral pieces. Fonteyn's work has been heard on television since he recorded for Boosey & Hawkes in the 1970s. A music library recording was used as the theme of the British sitcom Please Sir! in 1968, and "Pop Looks Bach," recorded in 1970, was later used as the theme of the long-running television programme Ski Sunday. He started out by playing jazz at the Black Sheep club in London in the 1950s.

His work was also featured on SpongeBob SquarePants, Seinfeld, The Ren & Stimpy Show, Nirvanna the Band the Show, and Family Guy (a vaudeville duo use Fonteyn's "Galloping Gertie" as a vamp in a recurring gag).

Fonteyn was born in Birmingham and died in Islington, London.
