= Snowboard Magazine =

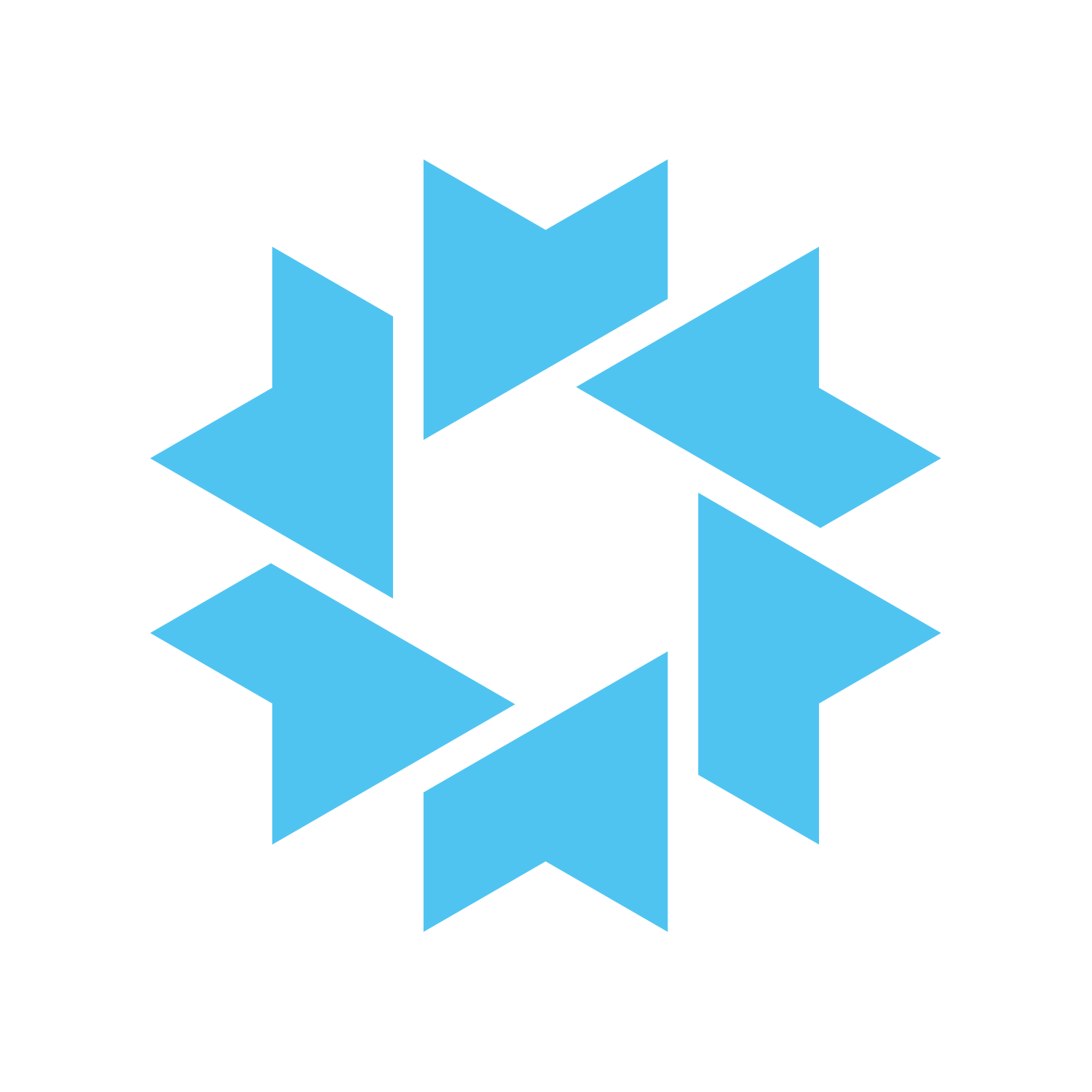
- Categories: Snowboarding
- Founder: Mark Sullivan, Liz Sullivan
- First issue: April 2004
- Final issue: February 2016
- Country: United States
- Based in: Hailey, Idaho
- Language: English
- Website: snowboard-mag.com

Snowboard Magazine is an independent snowboarding publication. It was founded in April 2004 by Mark Sullivan and Liz Sullivan in Hailey, Idaho. Soon they were joined by Jeff Baker, Jeff Douglass, Aaron Draplin, Gary Hansen and Jason "J2" Rasmus. Most of the crew were previous employees and/or contracted employees of Snowboarder Magazine. Until 2007 Mark Sullivan was also the publisher. The magazine was the first product-focused magazine in snowboarding, quickly set trends for competing titles to follow, and quickly became the third-largest snowboarding publication in the world. In 2011 Snowboard Magazine was sold to Storm Mountain Publishing, publishers of Freeskier Magazine, which is based in Boulder, Colorado.

In February 2007, the print edition of Snowboard Magazine ceased publication, going completely online.
