= Ross Rebagliati =

Canadian snowboarder

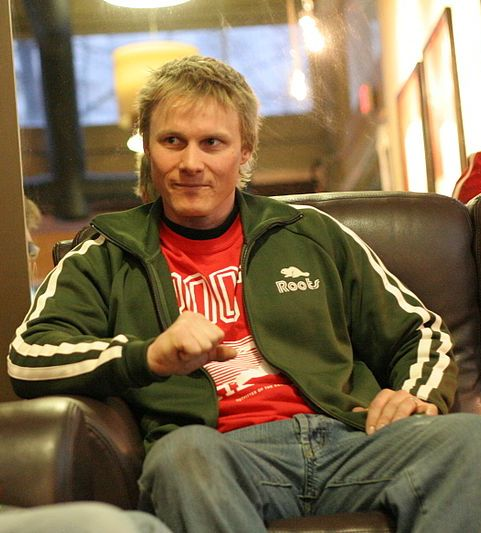
- Rebagliati in 2006

Personal information
- Born: July 16, 1971 (age 55) Vancouver, British Columbia, Canada
- Height: 178 cm (5 ft 10 in)
- Weight: 81 kg (179 lb)
Medal record
Men's snowboarding
Representing Canada
Olympic Games
Gold medal – first place	1998 Nagano	Giant Slalom

Ross Rebagliati (born July 14, 1971) is a Canadian snowboarder who won a gold medal in the inaugural men's giant slalom event at the 1998 Winter Olympics. The International Olympic Committee initially stripped him of the medal due to a failed drug test for cannabis use, but was overruled by an appeals court two days later, resulting in the medal being restored. Since retiring from snowboarding, Rebagliati has become an entrepreneur in the cannabis industry.

== Early snowboarding career ==
Rebagliati was born in Vancouver, British Columbia, in 1971. He took up snowboarding at the age of 15 and won the Canadian and U.S. Amateur Snowboard Championships in 1990. He turned pro in 1991, winning the Mount Baker Banked Slalom in 1992, the U.S. Open in 1994, and the European Championship in 1994. In 1996, he won the World Cup Super-Giant Slalom in his hometown of Whistler, British Columbia.

== Gold medal at 1998 Winter Olympics ==
Snowboarding was first introduced to the Olympics at the 1998 Winter Olympics in Nagano, Japan. Rebagliati became the first gold medalist in the men's giant slalom event; however, a drug test sample that he submitted showed 17.8 ng/mL of THC metabolites in his urine, slightly higher than the 15 ng/mL threshold used by the International Ski Federation. The International Olympic Committee (IOC) executive board voted 3–2 to disqualify him from competition on February 11, 1998, which the Canadian Olympic Association immediately appealed. Rebagliati admitted to having previously used cannabis as recently as April 1997, but said the failed test was due to secondhand exposure. On February 13, an appeals court ruled in Rebagliati's favour, restoring the medal. Cannabis had not been officially banned by the IOC and therefore it had no authority to strip the medal, the court ruled. Rebagliati appeared on The Tonight Show with Jay Leno immediately afterwards to discuss the ordeal, while Saturday Night Live lampooned him in a comedy sketch, further cementing his fame.

Before leaving Japan, Rebagliati was questioned by police for seven hours on suspicion of having committed a drug crime, but no charges were ever filed. He was later banned from entering the United States and put on the No Fly List that was created following the September 11 attacks. This prevented him from participating in future competitions such as the X Games, which Rebagliati says severely hurt his snowboarding career.

Two months after the drug testing incident, in April 1998, the IOC officially banned cannabis use. The New York Times dubbed the decision "the Ross Rebagliati Rule". In 2013, the THC metabolite limit for Olympic athletes was raised to 150 ng/mL, so as to only detect current intoxication.

== Activities after snowboarding ==
Since the 1998 Olympics, Rebagliati has become an outspoken advocate and entrepreneur for cannabis. He has also been involved in multimillion-dollar real estate development projects throughout British Columbia, as well as residential construction. Rebagliati was the subject of full-page coverage in the July 14, 2008, edition of Sports Illustrated, which profiled his life since his Olympic win.

As a member of the Make-a-Wish Foundation, Ross helped grant wishes of children as far away as Florida. Ross has worked with other charities including the Whistler Rotary Club, BC Sports Hall of Fame, Big Brothers of Greater Vancouver, Kids Help Phone, and The Whistler Blackcomb Foundation.

On October 23, 2009, Rebagliati announced that he would seek the federal Liberal Party nomination for the Okanagan—Coquihalla riding, in British Columbia. At the time, political observers suggested that this could be a tough challenge for the former Olympian, as the seat was held by Minister of International Trade, Stockwell Day. Eventually he bowed out as his business ventures brought him home to Whistler.

During the Canadian federal election of 2015, Rebagliati commented that he looked forward to the new Liberal government fulfilling its promise to legalize marijuana in Canada. He told the CBC, "I mean, to think I can be involved in helping people and sharing the knowledge that I have and a lot of people have about cannabis to the mainstream public. I think it's my responsibility." A 2018 profile of Rebagliati in The New York Times detailed his post-Olympic struggles and how "Rebagliati is hoping that Canada's action to legalize marijuana last month will bring him closure, business opportunity and, perhaps most importantly, vindication".

Rebagliati stated in a 2015 interview that he believes cannabis is a performance-enhancing drug, as it "puts you in the moment" and "you get in a zone where you can give it a 110%". He has touted the benefits of CBD in particular, noting its anti-inflammatory properties and that it "has a calming effect reducing stress and anxiety which are two more realities of being an athlete".

=== Cannabis industry ===
In January 2013, Rebagliati and his business partner, Patrick Smyth, launched Ross' Gold, a medical marijuana business. Ross' Gold's primary focus remains on establishing a brand in Canada and gaining a foothold in the industry under the federal government's new regulations. Under the new Marijuana for Medical Purposes Regulations, cannabis would be treated as any other narcotic used for medical purposes, enabling patients to acquire products as needed based on a health care practitioner's prescription.

Since announcing the launch of Ross' Gold medical marijuana, Rebagliati has been featured in numerous publications including USA Today, the Huffington Post, the CBC with Jian Ghomeshi, The Toronto Sun, and the cover of High Times in October 2013.

In April 2015, Ross launched his own line of glassware and expanded his brand into over 100 stores across Canada, and branched out into hemp CBD edibles. In December 2017, R Gold Enterprises Inc. bought the Ross' Gold Trademark and focused on building franchised stores under the new legalization of cannabis laws in Canada.

In January 2018, Ross and his business partner Patrick Smyth founded Legacy Brands by Ross Rebagliati, which promotes healthy living and finding that athlete in us all through everyday family-friendly products. Focusing on CBD products, Ross stated: "Canadians are opening up more and more to cannabis, and many older people are really understanding as to the benefits of CBD; which is used to treat medical conditions like epilepsy. It is gaining favour among athletes and the public alike. Unlike other extracts, CBD is not psychoactive and is used for sleep regulation, inflammation, and anxiety. We are excited. We feel the rest of the country will adopt a healthy use of cannabis in the coming years."

== Personal life ==
Ross is the father of three children and resides in Penticton, British Columbia, with his wife Ali.

== Bibliography ==
- Off the Chain: An Insider's History of Snowboarding. By Ross Rebagliati. Greystone Books, 2009. ISBN 978-1-55365-487-2

== See also ==
- Cannabis and sports
