= Ed vs. Spencer =

British reality television series

- Genre: Reality
- Created by: Kenny Hotz; Spencer Rice
- Presented by: Ed Leigh; Spencer Claridge
- Country of origin: United Kingdom
- No. of series: 1
- No. of episodes: 10

Production
- Running time: 30mins (inc. comms)
- Production company: Monkey Kingdom

Original release
- Network: Sky One
- Release: 24 November 2004 – 26 January 2005

Related
- Kenny vs. Spenny

Ed vs. Spencer is a reality show based on the Canadian show Kenny vs. Spenny. It ran for one series from 24 November 2004 to 26 January 2005 on Sky One in the UK.

In the US, Ed vs. Spencer has been broadcast on BBC America as part of its programming lineup entitled "The Underground" on Thursday nights.

It focuses on two best friends, Ed Leigh and Spencer Claridge, who are constantly competing against each other in unusual and weird challenges for supremacy and bragging rights.

The comedy of the show did not focus so much on the challenges, but in the way the two competitors face them. Spencer is a doe-eyed innocent who steadfastly believes in hard work and persistence. In contrast, Ed will lie, cheat and do whatever else he can to beat his friend. At the end of the programme, the loser had to undergo a humiliating forfeit chosen by the victor.

== Episode list ==
1. Who can make himself the sickest?
2. Who can stay handcuffed the longest?
3. Who's the most attractive to women?
4. Who can survive in the woods the longest?
5. Who can make the best porn?
6. Who is the hardest?
7. Who do kids like more?
8. Who can put on the most weight?
9. Who can make himself more famous?
10. Who can make the most money in three days?
