= Reto Lamm =

Swiss snowboarder

Reto Lamm (born 1970) is a former snowboarding champion from Switzerland.

He was born in Samedan and educated at Zuoz boarding school. He was a professional snowboarder, Halfpipe, Freestyle Big air, from 1989 until 2000

Winner of the first Air & Style in Innsbruck, Austria Worldcup winner overall 1991 Halfpipe, ISF Worldcup second 1992 Halfpipe, ISF Worldcup third 1993 Halfpipe, ISF

Swisschampion Halfpipe 1994 European vice Champion Avoriaz Halfpipe 1992

Filmography:

Snowboard Videos:

See, hear, speak no evil

Mac Dawg productions

Volcom Stone film

Feature Films:

White Magic by Willy Bogner shown in Movie Theatres in Europe Fire Ice and Dynamite by Willy Bogner Ski to the Max by Willy Bogner

Design and Marketing Consultant:

Design consultant at Northwave snowboard Boots, Design of the " Reto Lamm " Snowboard bood, existing over 6 Years. Co creation of the Espresso Streetshoe. Design Consultant for the Fire and Ice Snowboard clothing line from 1994 until 1998 Rad Air Snowboards co founder. Design of the "Reto Lamm Pro Model" over 8 Years Currently president of TTR Snowboard World tour

After the 12-year-long Snowboard profession, Reto Lamm started to work on several projects outside snowboarding and specialized in company Media Presentations, involving all digital platforms such as 3d animation, film, etc.
