= Aimee Fuller =

British snowboarder

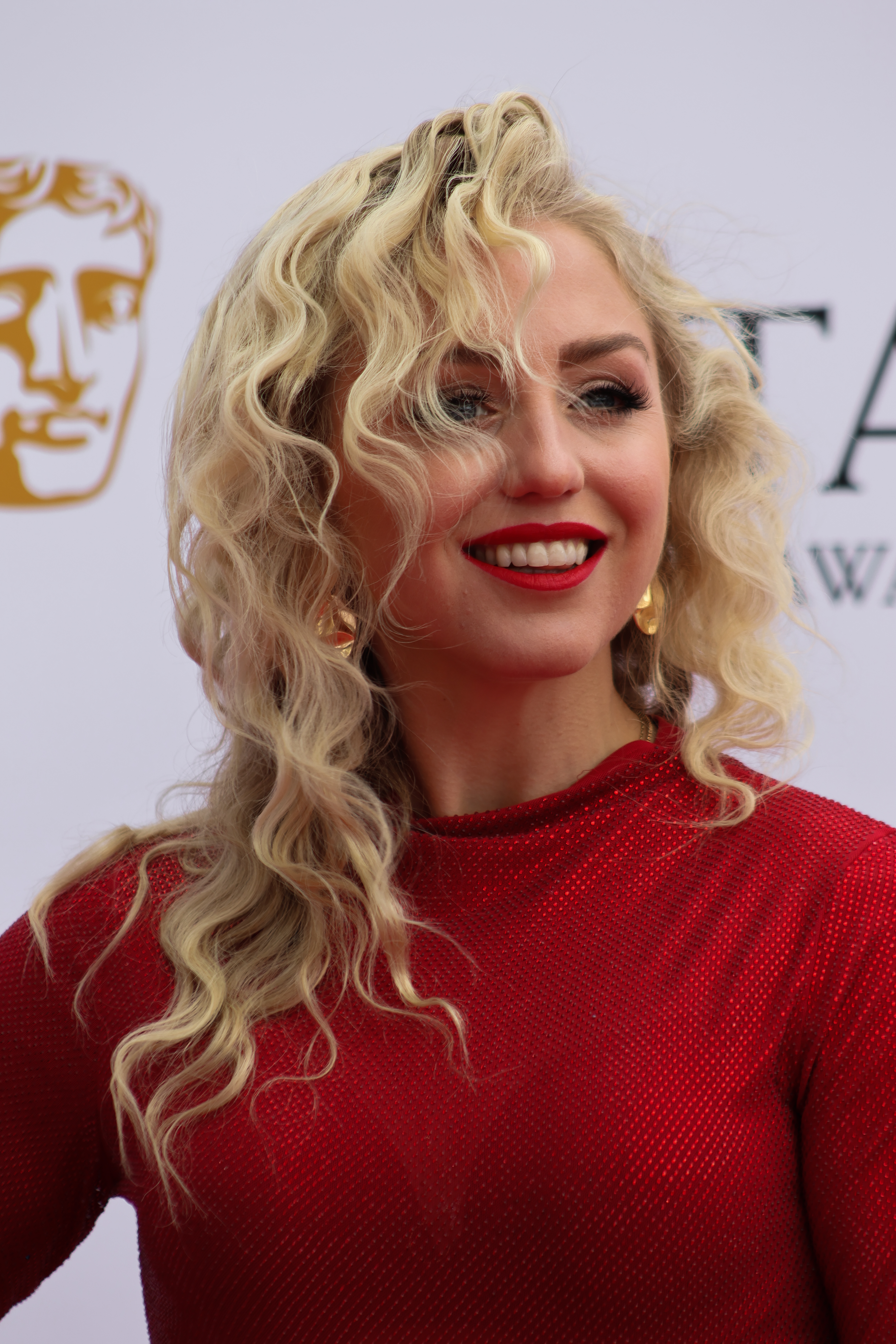
- Fuller at the 2026 British Academy Television Awards

Personal information
- Born: 21 July 1991 (age 34) Farnborough, London, UK
- Height: 163 cm (5 ft 4 in)
- Weight: 52 kg (115 lb)

Sport
- Country: Great Britain
- Sport: Snowboarding
- Event: Women's slopestyle

Aimee Nicole E. Fuller (born 21 July 1991) is a British slopestyle snowboarder who represented Great Britain at the 2014 Winter Olympics and the 2018 Winter Olympics.

== Early life ==
Fuller was born in Farnborough, and grew up in nearby Keston. She moved to Washington D.C., United States, in 2003 aged 12, attending the British International School of Washington, but moved back to the United Kingdom at the age of 16 to live in Northern Ireland, where she attended Sullivan Upper School in Holywood.

== Career ==
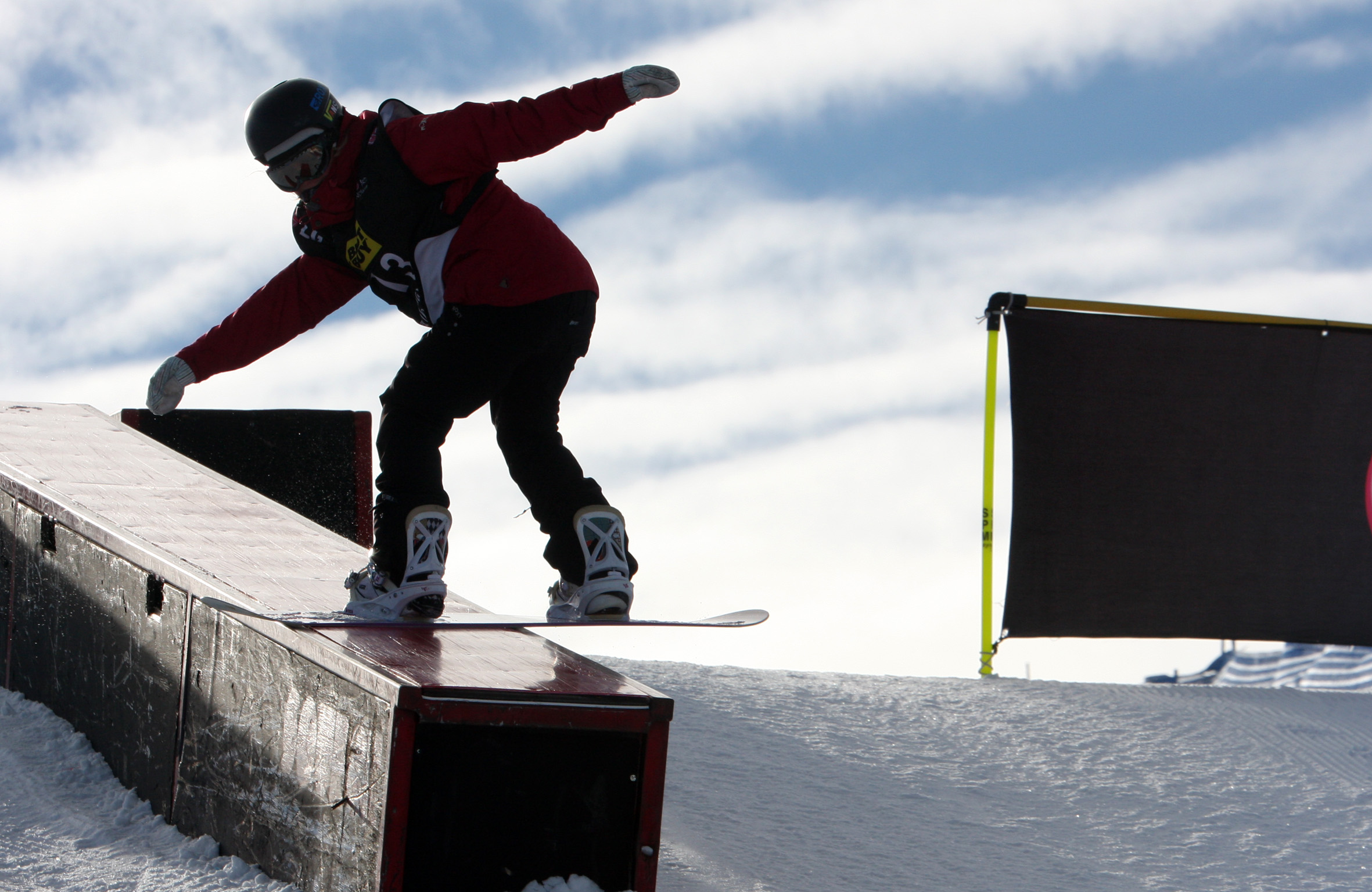
Fuller competing in a World Cup event in Calgary in January 2010

Fuller finished 7th in the overall rankings during the 2013/14 season. She has competed at the X Games, finishing 6th in the Winter X Games in Europe, eighth in the Winter X Games XVII in 2013 and seventh in the Winter X Games XVIII in 2014. By 2017, she finished 5th in the World Rankings, 3rd in the World Cup Big Air Super Series Tour and was British Champion for Slopestyle and Big Air.

Fuller is a two-time Olympian, having competed for Great Britain at the 2014 Winter Olympics in Sochi, Russia, and at the 2018 Winter Olympics in Pyeongchang, South Korea. In the 2014 women's slopestyle event, she scored 39.00 on her first run and 44.50 on her second run during her heat to finish tenth and so did not qualify directly for the final. She then competed in the semi-finals of the competition scoring 33.75 on her first run and 37.50 on her second run to finish in ninth place, missing out on qualification for the finals and finishing in 17th position overall. Following her elimination, Fuller joined the BBC Sport commentary team for the final of her event as compatriot Jenny Jones won a bronze medal, the nation's first ever Olympic medal on snow. Fuller and the other members of the commentary team – Ed Leigh and Tim Warwood – were criticised for their bias towards Jones, and a "deeply unprofessional display of commentary"; the presenters also cheered when Jones' competitor, Anna Gasser, fell during her run. The incident drew more than 300 complaints. In the 2018 women's slopestyle event, she scored 34.63 on her first run and 41.43 on her second run, finishing in 17th position overall. In the 2018 women's big air event, she scored 25.00 on her first run and 14.25 on her second run during her heat to finish 25th and so did not qualify directly for the final. In January 2021, Fuller announced her retirement from competitive snowboarding.

In April 2019, Fuller ran her first marathon, the Pyongyang Marathon in North Korea.

Fuller took part in series five of Celebrity Hunted in 2023, alongside Strictly Come Dancing star Katya Jones.
