= Mount Baker Hard Core =

The original Mount Baker Hard Core (MBHC) consisted of Craig Kelly, Gillian Kelly, Jeff Fulton and Dan Donnelly, who were a tight squad of snowboarders coming from Mount Vernon, Washington. MBHC also included Eric Swanson, Swany, Eric Janko, Carter Turk, and eventually Mike Ranquet. Mike ("Tex") Devenport, Jaime Lynn, Dan Donnelly, and Bryan ("little b") Hartman are other people considered MBHCs. They were a little snow tribe that possessed a family feel or brotherhood, for a brief period, snowboarding at Mount Baker Ski Area during the early and mid-1980s.

Other notable Mt. Baker snowboarders from the era include: Jason Bass, Marcela Dobis, Gillian Kelly, Amy Howat, Rob Hanson, and Dan Buecking. See also the so-called "Shitty Kids" crew from Bellingham, Washington: Shane Briggs, James Klinedinst, Chris Rosinski, Steve Purtill, Chris Todd, and Ben Todd.

In 1991 a snowboarding video called "Baked" the MBHC' was released on VHS which included most of the MBHC and friends.
