= Terje Håkonsen =

Norwegian snowboarder

Terje Håkonsen (born 11 October 1974) is a Norwegian professional snowboarder. He is considered one of the most influential snowboarders in the history of the sport. In the book The way of the snowboarder, Rob Reed wrote that "Haakonsen took the young sport of snowboarding and revolutionized nearly every aspect of it".

Håkonsen dominated freestyle competitions during the 1990s. He won the International Snowboarding Federation (ISF) World Championship in halfpipe three times: 1993, 1995 and 1997. He won the European Championship in halfpipe each and every time he participated (1991, 1992, 1993, 1994 and 1997). Håkonsen won the US Open Halfpipe Finals three times (1992, 1993 and 1995), and the Mt. Baker Banked Slalom seven times (1995, 1996, 1998, 2000, 2003, 2004 and 2012). He also took victory in the influential Innsbruck Air & Style competition in 1995. In 2007, Håkonsen set the world record for the highest air when he achieved a height of 9.8 metres above the top of the quarterpipe during a qualification round at The Arctic Challenge in Midtstuen, Oslo, with a backside 360.

Håkonsen's flowing style and his proficiency on all types of terrain have characterised his snowboarding. While the foundations of his career were laid in halfpipe competitions, he also established himself as a dominant athlete through films and international snowboard productions. Here he would show his skills freeriding in powder, big mountains and in "big air" competitions — the forerunners to today's slopestyle competitions.

== Background ==
Håkonsen was born and grew up in the mountain village of Åmot in Vinje Municipality in Telemark county. He is the son of Per Håkonsen from Meråker Municipality in Trøndelag county and Sidsel Håkonsen from Sørøya in Finnmark county. He has an older brother and a younger sister.

As a child, Håkonsen displayed excellent athletic abilities. Apart from participating in athletics, cross-country skiing and jumping, he was on the local downhill ski team and football team. Due to his football skills, he was nicknamed "little Maradonna", and it has been claimed that he could have played professionally if he had carried on.

Håkonsen currently lives in Oslo.

== Career ==
The Uvyrdslåmi snowboarding team was founded in the summer of 1987 in Åmot. During the course of the first season, the club took on almost 100 members. Several of them - led by siblings Einar and Åshild Lofthus – quickly established themselves in the snowboarding elite on both the national and international scene. In the autumn of 1987, Håkonsen had his first goes on borrowed boards on the alpine slopes at Rauland and in the fields around his parents' house in Åmot. In February 1988 he bought his own second hand board, and the month after he participated in the Nordic Championship held at Rauland. Håkonsen won in the junior class, and quickly became part of the team of the Norwegian importer for snowboard manufacturer Burton Snowboards, Elling Balhald. After winning a number of Norwegian competitions in the 1988–1989 season, Håkonsen was invited to meet Craig Kelly at Juvass (Galdhøpiggen Summer Ski Centre). At the time, Kelly was the world's leading and best known snowboarder. Håkonsen has on several occasions said that he regarded Kelly as his mentor. In turn, Kelly saw the boy's potential and put him in touch with his sponsor, Burton Snowboards. At the age of 15, Håkonsen travelled to the US by himself and negotiated his first professional contracts with Burton and Oakley. Håkonsen completed the final year of lower secondary school and then took the decision, due to the contracts, not to apply to upper secondary school.

Håkonsen made his international debut in February 1990 with a fifth-place finish in halfpipe at the World Cup in St. Moritz. One month later he began to be noticed a lot more following a fifth-place finish in halfpipe at the US Open as part of a strong field. Håkonsen also came fifth in the halfpipe and moguls in the same year at the world championships in Breckenridge. This was the last year that the moguls were included as an event in snowboarding competitions. During his first seasons, Håkonsen took part in both the freestyle and alpine branches of snowboarding. Despite the strong wishes of his sponsors that he participate in all forms of competition, Håkonsen opted to focus solely on halfpipe and freeriding during the course of the 1990–1991 season. Part of the reason that he had previously stopped competing in alpine skiing was that he was tired of the strict competitive regime, feeling there was too little play or action. He found the alpine discipline of snowboarding to have similar traits. In protest at the pressure to compete in all forms of competition, he began taking part in alpine events using a freestyle board. The last competition at which he participated in the alpine disciplines was the European championship in 1991. He took fourth place in the parallel slalom on the same board he used to win the halfpipe competition.

In the years that followed, Håkonsen dominated freestyle snowboarding. In the 1991–1992 season, he won 14 international competitions - including a number of world cup meetings - in a row. It has been claimed that he was the first snowboarder during this period to achieve a "rock-'n'-roll hero"-status. The 1994 season was the last one in which Håkonsen participated in the world cup with overall victory as a goal - he felt there was too little time for freeriding and too much focus on competitions.

After Håkonsen had featured in a number of different snowboarding films, Volcom produced a biographical film in 1996 about Håkonsen entitled Subjekt Haakonsen. This was followed up with The Haakonsen faktor in 1999. In 2005, he featured in the documentary First Descent, in which he was the first person to ever snowboard down peak 7601 in Alaska.

When the halfpipe was introduced as an Olympic event during the 1998 Winter Olympics in Nagano, Håkonsen boycotted the qualifiers. Håkonsen, as well as many other snowboarders, were unhappy with the IOC, particularly because they had chosen the International Ski Federation (FIS) to organise qualification instead of the snowboarders' own federation, the ISF. Håkonsen considered this to be a theft of the sport.

== Life after the competitive career ==
Although Håkonsen never formally retired, it became increasingly rare to see him at competitions towards the end of the 1990s. Unhappy with the traditional competition format, he created his own competition, The Arctic Challenge, in 2000. The basic idea behind the competition was that it should be on the snowboarders' own terms. In 2002, The Arctic Challenge, along with other independent events, launched the Ticket to Ride World Snowboard tour. This tour, which is now known as the World Snowboard tour, is now the biggest, most prestigious international snowboard tour in the world.

Håkonsen is still a professional snowboarder. He spends most of his time recording films and working for sponsors, but periodically appears in competitions. In 2012 he won the Mt. Baker Banked Slalom for the seventh time. In the same year he came fifth in the quarterpipe and won "highest air" at the snowboarding world championships in Oslo. In March 2015 he won the Sudden Rush Banked Slalom in Laax, Switzerland.

In 2015, Håkonsen made disparaging comments on Twitter about professional skier Gus Kenworthy after Kenworthy came out as gay. Håkonsen's comments were widely criticized by the snowboard community, including professional snowboarders Todd Richards and Spencer O'Brien. In a following interview with Snowboarder Magazine, Håkonsen refused to apologize, saying that he was misunderstood and that "some people are thin-skinned."

In recent years in Norway, Håkonsen has become a spokesman for organic food and healthy dieting through interviews, TV appearances, and newspaper articles. He also opposed Oslo's bid to host the 2022 Winter Olympics, and in September 2014 he participated in a live debate on the NRK 1 TV channel on the issue.

== Philanthropy ==
Håkonsen's activities go beyond his own discipline and elite sport. Together with the philanthropist Jan Chr. Sundt, he has founded the Funkisstiftelsen foundation and Greener Events. The Funkisstiftelsen foundation is intended to initiate and inspire activities on snow for those with physical disabilities. Greener Events has established itself as a leader in facilitating and providing advice on environmental awareness for all types of sporting and cultural events.

== Prizes and awards ==
- Mickey Mouse club Hall of fame 1991.
- Rider of the year, Transworld's snowboarding reader's awards, 1998.
- Piperider of the year, Transworld's snowboarding reader's awards, 1999.
- Best overall rider, Transworld's snowboarding reader's awards, 2000.
- Best Overall rider, Transworld's snowboarding reader's awards, 2001.
- Reader's choice, Transworld's snowboarding reader's awards, 2001.
- NEA Snowboarding award, 2001.
- Standout of the year, Transworld's snowboarding reader's awards, 2008.
- Vinje Municipality Cultural Prize 2009

== Film, video and TV ==
- Pocahontas (1991). Mack Dawg Productions.
- Riders on the storm (1992). Fall Line Films.
- Project 6 (1993). Fall Line Films.
- Totally Board 2 A new way of thinking (1992). Standard films.
- Totally Board 3 Coming Down The Mountain (1993). Standard films.
- Carving the white'' (1993). Rap Films.
- Roadkill (1993). Fall Line Films.
- Alive we ride (1993). Volcom.
- Upping the Ante (1993) Mack Dawg Productions.
- Totally Board 4 Run To The Hills (1994). Standard films.
- MTV Sports (1994).
- The garden (1994). Volcom.
- Meltdown Project (1995) Mack Dawg Productions.
- Freestyle swing (1995). Volcom.
- Milk (1995). High Voltage Productions.
- Totally Board 6 Carpe Diem (1996). Standard films.
- Subjekt Haakonsen (1996). Volcom.
- I Know What You Did Last Winter (1998). RJ Films.
- The Haakonsen Faktor'' (1999). Volcom.
- Extreme (1999). IMAX.
- Luminous Llama (2000). Volcom.
- Mt. Baker's Legendary Banked Slalom (Video) (2002).
- Notice To Appear (2002). Fall Line Films.
- White Balance (2003). Fall Line Films.
- White Space (TV Short) (2003).
- Først & sist (TV Series) (2003).
- Big Youth Happening Two (2003). Volcom.
- Escramble (2006). Volcom.
- First Descent (2005). Universal studios.
- AK and Beyond (2005). Universal studios.
- Escramble (2006). Volcom.
- Ticket to Ride (TV Series) (2006)
- For Right or Wrong (2006). Burton snowboards.
- Terje's season pass (2007). Friday productions and Burton Snowboards.
- That's It, That's All (2008). Brain Farm Productions
- It's Always Snowing Somewhere: Part 1 (2008).
- Standing Sideways (2011). Burton Snowboards.
- We Ride: The Story of Snowboarding (2012). Burn.
- Jeremy Jones' Further (2012). Teton Gravity Research.
- Supervention (2013). Field Productions
- Veeco (2014). Volcom.
- True to this (2014). Volcom.
- Snowboarding For Me (2014). Oakley.
- Supervention II (2016)
