= Craig Kelly (snowboarder) =

American snowboarder

- Born: April 1, 1966; Granite City, Illinois, U.S.
- Died: January 20, 2003 (aged 36); Revelstoke, British Columbia, Canada
- Cause of death: Snow avalanche
- Education: University of Washington
- Occupation: Professional Snowboarder

Craig Kelly (April 1, 1966 – January 20, 2003) was an American professional snowboarder. Kelly is known as the 'Godfather of Freeriding'; Terje Håkonsen called Kelly the best snowboarder of all time. Over his 15-year professional career, he won 4 world championships and 3 U.S. championships; he won the Mt. Baker Banked Slalom snowboarding competition in 1988, 1991, and 1993.

== Education ==
Kelly graduated from Mount Vernon High School in 1983. He attended the University of Washington but left the school to pursue professional snowboarding just prior to earning his degree.

== Snowboarding ==
Initially contracted under SIMS Snowboards (founded by Tom Sims) from 1983 until 1987, this ended following a lawsuit. He spent the remainder of his life riding for Burton Snowboards, owned by Jake Burton Carpenter.

Kelly was responsible for the design and development of the following Burton signature models: The Mystery Air, The Craig Kelly Air, The CK Slopestyle, The Cascade, and The Omen. Jake Burton is quoted as saying, “When I started listening to Craig that was when my company became successful and really took off,” adding that “… when the rest of the industry listened to Craig, that was when the sport really took off.”

He shocked the snowboard industry by walking away from multimillion-dollar deals at the height of the snowboard craze, to pursue his passion for freeriding. It was in freeriding where Craig felt the happiest. At the time, this was an unheard-of strategy for a pro snowboarder.

The Craig Kelly World Snowboard Camp was created to help kids improve their snowboarding skills. From 1988 to 1992 it was located in Whistler Blackcomb.

Kelly starred in a Wrigleys Gum commercial in 1988/1989 where he was featured doing a 540. He appeared in Warren Miller movies for several consecutive years. In 2003, following his death, Warren Miller dedicated a segment in his film titled "Journey" to Kelly. Kelly had uncredited starring roles in the Greg Stump films Siberia and P-Tex, Lies & Duct Tape, and was the first snowboarder to appear in an IMAX movie.

Kelly was part owner and on the board of directors of Island Lake Catskiing near Fernie B.C., where he spent a lot of time freeriding and filming.

In the last few years of his life, Craig embarked on a 14-month journey starting up in Alaska and going down to Chile with his girlfriend, Savina, and two friends for adventure, surfing and living. He returned from his journey with his new baby Olivia, as a "souvenir," he said, from his trip.

After returning to Canada, he became involved with the development of Baldface Lodge, near his home in Nelson BC, and concurrently decided to pursue his guiding certification with the Association of Canadian Mountain Guides (ACMG), attempting to become the first accredited snowboard guide in Canada.

== Style ==
The distinctive fluid manner with which he rode was recognized and acclaimed in the snowboarding community. He was called a "style master" by TransWorld Snowboard Magazine editor Jon Foster. Kelly also appeared in an enormous number of video and photo shoots. He was known for looking straight at the camera, even in the midst of a difficult aerial manoeuvre.

== Death ==
Kelly died on 20 January 2003 near Revelstoke, British Columbia, Canada in an avalanche which trapped 8 people and killed 6 others. At the time, he was studying to become a Certified Canadian Mountain Guide.

== Craig Kelly memorial ==
In 2012 the owner of Baldface lodge, Jeff Pensiero, asked Keith Berens of Live Metal Studio to design a memorial sculpture for Kelly.

The memorial is a 10-ft welded steel sword (often mistaken for a cross), with coloured glass set within it and a prayer wheel made from local yew wood beneath. It was unveiled on 20 January 2013.

The sword overlooks Baldface Lodge near Nelson, British Columbia. It was sponsored by Baldface Lodge and Burton Snowboards.

== See also ==
- Mount Baker Hard Core
- The Darkest White - by Eric Blehm
