= Barrett Christy =

American snowboarder

Christy in 2026

Barrett Christy is an American snowboarder and Winter Olympics Athlete. She currently resides in Gig Harbor, Washington.

Christy was a member of the first U.S. Snowboarding team during the 1998 Winter Olympics. She has won more medals than any other female athlete in the Winter X Games, until Lindsey Jacobellis passed her.

== History ==
Christy was born in Buffalo, New York, and grew up in Bucks County, Pennsylvania. She learned to snowboard in 1991 and has been competing since the mid-1990s. She lived in Breckenridge, Colorado from 1991 to 1995, living hand-to-mouth in poverty like a "ski bum". She later moved to upscale Vail after going "Big Time."

Christy's signature move is called the "Barrett Roll".

== Media appearances ==
Christy has been featured in Hardly Angels (2002) and Our Turn (2001), both all-girl snowboard films by White Knuckle Extreme. In 2007, she was featured in the women's snowboard movie Float.

== Other work ==
Christy oversees the design of women's snowboards for Gnu Snowboards, including the Gnu Barret Christy Pro Model (B-Pro), which is the longest-running women's pro model snowboard.

== Competition history ==
- 2003 Mt. Baker Banked Slalom - 5th
- 2002 Winter X Games - 3rd Slopestyle
- 2002 World Championships - 3rd Superpipe
- 2001 ESPN Action Sports and Music Awards - Female Snowboarder of the Year
- 2001 Mt. Baker Banked Slalom - 1st Pro Women
- 2001 Grand Prix in Mammoth and Breckenridge, 1st
- 2000 Winter X Games - 2nd Superpipe/ 3rd Slopestyle
- 2000 US Open - 3rd Superpipe
- 2000 Winter Gravity Games - 3rd Big Air
- 2000 Transworld Riders Poll Awards - Best Overall Female Snowboarder
- 1999 Transworld Riders Poll Awards - Best Overall Female Snowboarder
- 1999 Summer X Games - 1st Big Air, 1999
- 1999 Winter X Games - 1st halfpipe / 2nd slopestyle
- 1999 Gravity Games, 3rd Big Air
- 1998 Winter X Games - 2nd Big Air, 2nd Slopestyle
- 1998 Olympic team member, Nagano Japan
- 1997 Winter X Games - 1st Big Air, 1st Slopestyle
- 1997 US Open - 1st Halfpipe, 1st Big Air
- 1997 US Open - 1st in Halfpipe and Big Air
- 1994 Amateur National Halfpipe contest, 1st
