= The Surfer's Path =

Surfing magazine

The Surfer's Path was a bi-monthly international surfing magazine founded by Alex Dick-Read. The magazine was established in 1997 as part of the Permanent Publishing stable (alongside Whitelines Snowboard Magazine and Sidewalk Skateboard Magazine). The headquarters was originally in Cornwall. It was then owned by Factory Media and had its headquarters in London, England. From 2004 it was published on recycled paper. An American edition of the magazine was edited by Drew Kampion. The Surfer's Path ceased publication in January 2014.

The Surfer's Path returned to independent ownership in 2019. Its editor is Tim Nunn, and it published as a quarterly journal.
