= Sidewalk (magazine) =

- Ben Raemers on the cover of Issue 137 (Jan 2008)
- Categories: Skateboarding
- Frequency: Monthly
- Founded: 1995
- First issue: September/October 1995
- Country: United Kingdom
- Language: English
- Website: Sidewalk

Sidewalk is an English language magazine that features skateboarding culture and is published by Factory Media.

== History ==
Originally known as "Sidewalk Surfer", the publication later changed its name to the current "Sidewalk" moniker. At the time of its inception, Sidewalk Surfer replaced R.A.D. (Read and Destroy) Magazine as Britain's only skateboarding magazine.

Founded in 1995, Sidewalk Surfer began publishing under Jim Peskett, owner of Permanent Publishing with Ben Powell at the helm as editor. Initially, the publishing and editorial team were all based in Oxford, England, where they worked alongside the editorial teams of sister titles Whitelines Snowboard Magazine and The Surfer's Path. The first issue was published in September/October 1995. It featured a young Tom Penny on the cover.

Andy Horsley, Chris Forder, Jon Robson and with Wig Worland as photo editor and chief photographer was the line up at its inception. Wig remained with Sidewalk until 2004 although he is still currently credited as a staff photographer.

Sidewalk has also featured the photographic work of Bryce Kanights, Richie Hopson, Fred Mortange, Giovanni Reda, Oliver Barton and Andrew Stark. Editorial contributions by professional skateboarders such as Geoff Rowley were also featured.

Sidewalk magazine helped to spawn the careers of characters such is Brian Sumner, Benny Fairfax, Olly Todd, John Rattray, Stuart Graham and more.

The print edition continues to boast a huge market share in the British skateboarding magazine category. Ben Powell (Who contributed to that first issue) now sits as editor and Leo Sharp (who also contributed back then) fills the role of Photo Editor. Kevin Parrott is the assistant editor of Sidewalk.

Early 2005 saw the release of the Globe Shoes "Finale Sidewalk" collaboration shoe.

The magazine moving to Factory Media was part of the merger of three leading specialist sports publishers. Action Sports Media (ASM), Permanent Publishing and 4130 Publishing. Jim Peskett remains as Publisher of the UK board sports arm of Factory.

== New media ==
The website www.sidewalkmag.com and online content is currently headed by Ryan Gray (Web Editor). Currently there is a push with their online position - none more so than with their Mpora site. This is shared between all of the Factory Media magazines.

== Videos ==
Sidewalk has to date produced one video, In Motion (2004), which was released on VHS and featured Ben Grove, Franklin Stephens, Paul Silvester, Ali Boulala, Pontus Alv, and Benny Fairfax.

Benny Fairfax's section was used as his introduction to Jason Lee and Chris Pastras which ultimately secured his place on the Stereo Sound Agency.

2011 also saw the release of 'In Progress' featuring; Conhuir Lynn, Harry Lintell, Chris Jones, Tom Harrisson, Nick Remon and more.
