= Jim Rippey =

American snowboarder (born 1970)

Personal information
- Full name: Jim Rippey
- Born: May 11, 1970 (age 56) Quincy, California, United States

Sport
- Country: United States
- Sport: Snowboarding

Jim Rippey (born May 11, 1970) is an American former professional snowboarder and snowboard designer for Burton Snowboards.

== Career ==
In the 1980s, Rippey became a professional snowboarder and accepted a sponsorship with Burton Snowboards. He was known for his extreme mountain freestyle snowboarding, which entailed boarding the largest mountains in the world and reaching the highest speeds and airs possible. Rippey made a name for himself in the 1990s by front and backflipping off of large cliffs in notable backcountry spots. He is also the first person to land a backflip on a snowmobile.

== Competitions and awards ==
- Winner, Burton U.S. Open 1997, Straight Jump
- Winner, Air & Style Contest 1997, Innsbruck
- Winner, Vans World Championships 1998, Straight Jump Winner
- Third Place, X-Games 1998 Space
- Winner, Göteborg Megastar Contest 1998, Straight Jump Winner
- Winner, Vans Triple Crown, Snow Summit 2001
- Big Air, (Straight Jump) Weltmeister 1998

== Personal life ==
As of 2011, Rippey has become the minister of Grace Church in Reno, Nevada. Rippey lives with his wife of ten years, Jennifer, and their three-year-old son, Jobe.

== Film and television ==
For the 1998 Winter Olympics, Rippey was a Play-by-play announcer for the snowboarding competitions.

- Ripley's Believe It or Not! (TV series) Himself – Episode #4.10 (2003)
- I Know What You Did Last Winter (video short) Himself (1998)
- Snowriders II (documentary) Himself (1997)
- Black Diamond Rush (documentary) Himself (1993)
