= Goalmouth (TV series) =

- Genre: Sport
- Written by: Neil Smythe; Steven Vinacour
- Directed by: Christian Welsh
- Starring: Adam Gendle; Tim Warwood; Charlotte Lade; Francis Vu
- Country of origin: United Kingdom
- Original language: English
- No. of series: 4
- No. of episodes: 35 (list of episodes)

Production
- Producer: Neil Smythe
- Editors: Adam Carter; Serah Morgan
- Running time: 22 minutes
- Production company: Sassy Films

Original release
- Network: Disney XD
- Release: 12 May 2011 – 20 September 2014

Goalmouth is a British television series focusing on football. The series made its debut on 12 May 2011 on Disney XD in the United Kingdom and Ireland. It is the first original series produced by Disney XD. On 23 January 2012, a second series was ordered by Disney XD. The third series was announced on 13 February 2013. On 27 March 2014, Disney UK commissioned a fourth season.

== Plot ==
Adam Gendle and Tim Warwood share their knowledge about football and compare players between segments that show teams playing. Francis Vu and Charlotte Lade offer some tricks, players partner with kids to improve their skills, and the hosts take part challenges that help them. Other recurring segments explore the history of football and revisit notable scores in big-league games.

== Cast ==
- Adam Gendle as the host
- Tim Warwood as the host
- Charlotte Lade as the expert
- Francis Vu as the expert

== Episodes ==
=== Series 4 (2014) ===
No.	Title	Original release date
26	"Episode 1"	24 April 2014
27	"Episode 2"	1 May 2014
28	"Episode 3"	8 May 2014
29	"Episode 4"	15 May 2014
30	"Episode 5"	22 May 2014
31	"Episode 6"	29 May 2014
32	"Episode 7"	5 June 2014
33	"Episode 8"	12 June 2014
34	"Episode 9"	13 September 2014
35	"Episode 10"	20 September 2014
