= Galloping Gertie =

Song

from the album Kpm 1000 Series: Silent Movies (Volume 1)
- Published: 1975
- Composer: Sam Fonteyn

"Galloping Gertie" is a 1975 saloon piano song by Sam Fonteyn. The song was featured in "Blackened Sponge" (season five, episode fourteen) of SpongeBob SquarePants.

It was used as the "Play me off, Johnny" music by the Vaudeville characters Vern and Johnny on Family Guy and appears in the episodes "Blind Ambition", "Perfect Castaway", "The Father, the Son and the Holy Fonz", "Deep Throats", "Saving Private Brian" and "Back to the Woods".
