= Graham Bell (skier) =

British skier and television presenter

Graham Bell (born 4 January 1966) is a former Olympic skier who is also a TV presenter, adventurer and journalist. He has presented several BBC TV shows with Ed Leigh including High Altitude in 2009 and Ski Sunday more recently. Highlights included Graham tackling the Arctic Circle Race – a 160 mi (260 km) cross-country skiing race in Greenland – and surviving a night in a snow-hole without food, water or a sleeping bag. He set a personal best top speed on skis of 121 mph (195 km/h). In January 2017 Bell set a World Record for towed speed, skiing 189.07kmh behind a Jaguar F-Pace in Sweden.

== Biography ==
Bell was born on the Akrotiri Royal Air Force station in Cyprus in 1966, the son of pilot Rod Bell and teacher Jean Bell. Graham's love of skiing started at age 5 when his father was posted to Edinburgh, Scotland. He learned to ski in the Cairngorm Mountains and Hillend dry slope. By the time the family moved to Yorkshire, England (where his father was posted), Graham and his brother Martin were both racing full-time on the World Cup circuit.

== Career ==
=== Athletic career ===
Graham Bell and his brother Martin competed for Britain throughout the 1980s and 1990s. Graham took a silver medal at the World Junior Ski Championships in 1984 and represented Great Britain at five Winter Olympics in Sarajevo 1984, Calgary 1988, Albertville 1992, Lillehammer 1994 and Nagano 1998. Bell achieved 12th place in the Hahnenkamm Race in Kitzbühel, Austria, in 1994.

=== Television career ===
After retiring as a professional ski racer in 1998, Graham started his television career at Eurosport commentating live on the World Cup Ski Circuit for two years, before moving over to an in-vision role on Ski Sunday. Graham was part of the Ski Sunday team which won a Royal Television Society award in 2002. He has presented and commentated on the 2002, 2006, 2010 and 2014 Winter Olympics.

Away from the mountains, Graham is the presenter of the BBC's World Championship Series triathlon coverage. He has worked on the Tour de France for ITV, and in 2009 competed in the Fastnet Race with Alex Thomson on Hugo Boss, filming, interviewing and presenting as well as working as an active crew member. Other TV credits include: The Gadget Show, Through the Keyhole, Celebrity Eggheads, Market Kitchen, Ready Steady Cook and travel shows including Wish You Here.

In 2003 he competed in the return of BBC1's Superstars. He achieved fourth place in the final, the best placed non-current athlete. Graham has competed in numerous triathlon competitions and 24-hour mountain biking events. He has ridden the Etape du Tour cycle race.

In 2009 Bell took part in the BBC2 series High Altitude, where participants took part in stunts such as 'summit hopping' and glacier climbing.

For a time, Graham was International Performance Director for the British Ski and Snowboard Federation. He is a patron of The British Ski Academy.

In 2021, Bell took part in the thirteenth series of Dancing on Ice partnering Karina Manta. They were the second couple to be eliminated.

=== Charity work ===
Graham is a patron of several UK charities including the DisabilitySnowsportUK, Snow Camp.

== Personal life ==
Bell is married and, with his wife Sarah, has two children, who are also keen skiers.

In 2018, Graham Bell attended the Royal Logistic Corps (RLC) alpine ski championships and completed the Super-G as a forerunner, whilst carrying no poles, holding a camera, and commentating. In March 2018, immediately after the RLC Championships, Graham Bell hosted a heliskiing week in Alagna, Italy.
