= Transworld Snowboarding =

American snowboarding magazine and website

- Categories: Sports magazine
- Frequency: 4 per year
- Total circulation (2012): 121,173
- First issue: 1987
- Final issue: March/April 2019
- Company: Motor Trend Group
- Country: United States
- Based in: Carlsbad, California
- Language: English
- Website: Transworld Snowboarding
- ISSN: 1046-4611

Transworld Snowboarding was an American magazine and website dedicated to snowboarding culture. When it closed, the magazine had most recently been published four times a year (for many years, Transworld Snowboarding published 10 issues per year). The magazine featured articles on the sport, culture and lifestyle of modern snowboarding.

== History ==
Transworld Snowboarding was first published in 1987 and was distributed internationally. Kevin Kinnear was the founding editor and Guy Motil was the first photo editor. From the launch of the magazine, the Transworld owners and editorial staff were instrumental in petitioning ski resorts to allow snowboarding.

During the late 1990s, a visit by "The Chameleon," an undercover splitboarder who would reassemble his snowboard at the top of the lift and ride down, was the editorial staff's instrument of choice for calling attention to the last ski resort holdouts including Alta, Park City, Aspen Mountain, Keystone, and Taos.

On October 15, 2002, Infogrames released a video game for the Xbox console titled Transworld Snowboarding developed by Housemarque. In 2005, the magazine and its likeness began appearing in the SSX videogame franchise, beginning with SSX On Tour.

In 2013, most of the Transworld titles were sold by Bonnier to Source Interlink Media, later TEN Publishing. In 2019, Transworld Snowboarding was sold by TEN to American Media, which closed the magazine.

It was the most widely subscribed snowboard magazine in the world with over 1.3 million copies sold annually (compared to Snowboarder Magazine at 800,000 annually). Its final editor was Annie Fast, aided by Nick Hamilton as photo/video editor (formerly of Whitelines snowboard magazine). For many years, Transworld Snowboarding published 10 issues per year.

== Mobile applications ==
=== Transworld Snowboarding Videos, How-To's & News ===
Transworld released its iPhone application in June 2010. The app features professional snowboarder videos, photography and news.

=== Transworld Snowboarding+ ===
In October 2010, Transworld Snowboarding launched the iPad edition of the magazine, called Transworld Snowboarding+. The iPad app features the print version of the magazine as well as iPad-only content like embedded videos, streaming audio and clickable links.
