= Matt Horne (snowboarder) =

Canadian snowboarder

Matt Horne (born March 6, 1978) is a Canadian snowboarder, Over his ten-year snowboarding career, he competed in over 125 race events in giant slalom, parallel slalom, parallel giant slalom and snowboard cross.

Born in Hamilton, Ontario, Matt Horne's snowboarding career with the Canadian National Snowboard Team officially began in March 1998 at the 1997–1998 National Championship in Mont-Tremblant, Quebec. It continued through until his last race at the 2007 Nor-Am Cup in Mt. Norquay, Alberta with a 10th-place finish in the Parallel GS. Matt has had 14 International Ski Federation World Cup starts, beginning in February 2000 in Sapporo, Japan where he finished in 30th place in Snowboard cross and 44th in the Parallel Giant Slalom event. Matt’s most prolific season was the 2002–2003 season, in which he competed in 23 different International Ski Federation race events. It might be argued that his best season was the 2003–2004 season where- in 14 races- Matt had eight Top 10 finishes, three of which were also Top 3 finishes.

Between the 2004–2005 and 2005–2006 seasons, Matt founded DECO Windshield Repair, a Canadian mobile windshield repair and glass treatment company, so that he could fund his training and career with the Canadian Snowboard Team. In 2016 he founded Beep For Service, a startup that lets users in Canada book car repair using a mobile app.
