= Ski Sunday =

British TV series (1978–)

- Genre: Winter sports
- Presented by: Ed Leigh; Chemmy Alcott
- Opening theme: "Pop Looks Bach" by Sam Fonteyn
- Country of origin: United Kingdom
- Original language: English
- No. of series: 47

Production
- Running time: 30–60 minutes
- Production company: BBC

Original release
- Network: BBC Two
- Release: 15 January 1978 – 1 February 2026

Related
- Sunday Grandstand

Ski Sunday is a weekly magazine-style television show covering winter sports, broadcast on BBC Two in the United Kingdom on Sundays in a late afternoon or an early evening timeslot. It began on 15 January 1978 and last aired on 1 February 2026. In 2026 at the time of cancellation, its presenters were Ed Leigh and Chemmy Alcott, with reporters Graham Bell, Tim Warwood, Jenny Jones, Aimee Fuller and Phil Young.

== History ==
Originally launched in 1978 following the 1976 Winter Olympics, later forming part of Sunday Grandstand and presented and commentated on by British broadcasters including Ron Pickering and David Vine (who presented the show for eighteen years until he took semi-retirement in 1996), the show focused primarily on the blue riband events of downhill skiing and slalom skiing. Following the final edition of Grandstand in early 2007, Ski Sunday became one of the longest-running BBC sports television programmes still being broadcast; the 2008 series was the 30th.

On 1 September 2026, the BBC announced that the programme was to finish after nearly 50 years on air.

== Format ==
As the British appetite for alpine skiing changed over time, the programme experimented with different formats and timeslots. In recent years the show has been presented by, amongst others, Hazel Irvine, Matt Chilton, former British Olympic skier Graham Bell and Ed Leigh. The 2008 season started on 20 January in an extended prime time slot (Sundays 19:00 to 20:00) and was broadcast weekly on BBC Two for eight weeks. The 2008 revised format covered most forms of competition skiing and snowboarding as well as covering travelogue and entertainment features. The series also offered interactive features via the BBC Red Button service.

The 2009 series began on 10 January with a special preview programme presented by Graham Bell covering a summer trek in the Alps. The 2009 series-proper started on 18 January, and was again broadcast on BBC Two and BBC Red Button. Prior to the launch of the 2009 season, it was reported that the more general winter sports content of the 2008 format was not popular with viewers, and the BBC acknowledged: "we didn't get things quite right last year. Ski racing fans wanted more of the action and our new viewers wanted more adventure." Consequently, for 2009 the show was divided into two programmes: Ski Sunday and High Altitude; the former covering ski racing and the latter, "mountain adventure".

For the 2010 season, High Altitude was dropped, and a stand-alone Ski Sunday comprised one half-hour programme weekly, shown around 17:00 on BBC Two on Sunday evenings. It consisted largely of events coverage, plus a new clothing, equipment and technology slot, with further events covered and a worldwide skiing weather report accessible afterwards via the Red Button digital services. Bell and Leigh continued to present.

For the 2011 season, Ski Sunday returned on 9 January 2011 on BBC Two and ran until 2 February 2011, with Ski Sunday Extra available via the BBC Red Button interactive services. The show's format continued the 2010 approach, focusing on coverage of the unfolding alpine ski racing season interspersed with occasional featured segments on alternative winter sports such as Crashed Ice downhill skating and snowboard events. The format for the 2012 series remained largely unaltered, continuing to focus on the key alpine ski racing events with extended (and sometime live) coverage via the BBC's interactive service. Short magazine pieces also focused on winter sport personalities (such as Jenny Jones), events (such as Slopestyle) and travelogues.

In 2013 for its 35th series, former Olympic skeleton champion Amy Williams joined the team.

In 2026, the show's final run was presented by Ed Leigh and former TeamGB skier Chemmy Alcott in 45 minute episodes in January and February at tea-time on BBC Two, focussing on international skiing competitions as well as snowboarding and other competitive snow sports. It also featured interviews with people such as leading British skier Dave Ryding and reports on the upcoming 2026 Winter Olympics in Milan.

== Theme tune ==
The theme music to the programme is "Pop Looks Bach" by Sam Fonteyn, which was also used as the theme tune for the BBC's coverage of the Winter Olympics until the 2006 Games. In the U.S., the religion-oriented radio show The World Tomorrow used "Pop Looks Bach" as its opening music during the 1980s. It was first recorded for the Boosey & Hawkes Music Library in 1970, and was not written for the BBC. It has similarities to the opening of Bach's Fugue in D minor, which is referenced to by a church organ in the background instrumentation of the original recording.

The song was used in British supermarket Sainsbury's' Christmas advert in 2023.

Although the title sequence changes in each episode, Nirvanna the Band the Show also uses "Pop Looks Bach" in the first episode of both its 2007 web series and its 2017 TV run, as well as the 2025 movie.

On September 1st 2026 after 48 years the BBC announced it was cancelling the show 30,000 people signed a petition to bring it back in the following weeks.

On October 20th 2026 Wavelength and Extreme International founders of the Extreme Sports Channel announced plans to re launch the show under the name Sunday in the Mountains on October 22nd they announced they had secured the rights to use Pop Looks Bach the iconic them tune from Ski Sunday.
