= Snowboarder Magazine =

American sports magazine

Snowboarder
- Editor: Pat Bridges
- Categories: Snowboarding
- Frequency: Five issues per year
- First issue: 1987
- Company: The Arena Group
- Country: United States
- Language: English
- Website: www.snowboarder.com

Snowboarder Magazine is a magazine dedicated to snowboarding that is published in print and online. The magazine was started in 1987. Five issues are published each year, as well as a photo annual and in addition to gear guides and a resort guide.

In 2014, the magazine released its first movie in over a decade, The SnowboarderMovie: Foreword starring a list of amateur riders.

== History ==
Snowboarder began life as a quarterly supplement to Surfer in late 1987, capitalising on the rapid growth of snowboarding. The first stand-alone buyer's-guide issue appeared in September 1989, and by 1990 the title had adopted a regular five-issue annual schedule.

=== Acquisition by The Arena Group (2022) ===
On 13 December 2022 The Arena Group announced a US$28.5 million deal to acquire the digital assets of Snowboarder, Surfer, Powder and several other niche titles.

In 2014 the editorial team released The Snowboarder Movie: Foreword, the magazine's first full-length feature in more than a decade.

== See also ==
- Transworld Snowboarding
- Snowboard Magazine
