= Marko Grilc =

Slovenian snowboarder (1983–2021)

Marko Grilc (7 July 1983 – 23 November 2021) was a Slovenian professional snowboarder and social media personality. He died in a snowboarding accident while exploring the terrain at the Austrian ski resort of Sölden with a filming team.
