= Matt Chilton =

British sports journalist

Matt Chilton is a sports journalist, commentator and presenter. He has worked for Eurosport since 1992, and for BBC Sport since the mid-nineties. Matt is a ski racing specialist and has been a contributor to Ski Sunday since 1996. He has been a regular for BBC Sport at Wimbledon since 2001, and has covered 17 Olympic Games, summer and winter.

Educated at Bedford School, prior to starting his broadcasting career Chilton worked in ski resorts including a season working for Mark Warner as the manager of the Hotel Moris in Val d'Isere during the 1989/90 winter season.
