= David Benedek =

German snowboarder

David Benedek (born 3 June 1980 in Munich, West Germany) is a former professional snowboarder. He was a co-founder of former US-based production company Robot Food, his creative work has been awarded by a variety of organisations including the Art Directors Club of Europe, the Red Dot and the IF Design Award. Neon Magazine named him as one of the 100 most influential young Germans.

== Competitive history ==
- Best Trick Award, Red Bull Gap Session, 2006 & 2008
- Transworld Readers Poll 2006 Standout of the Year
- Snowboarder Magazine Rider of the Year 2004
- Snowboarder Magazine Best Video Part of the Year 2004
- Snowboarder Magazine Rider of the Year 2003
- Snowboarder Magazine Best Video Part of the Year 2003
- Burton European Open Winner 2003
- 1st, Nokia Air & Style 2002

== Snowboard films ==
- 2000 Optigrab (TB10)
- 2002 Afterbang
- 2003 Lame
- 2004 Afterlame
- 2005 91 Words for Snow
- 2006 Red Bull Gap Session 2006
- 2007 In Short
