= Action Park =

Former American amusement park in New Jersey

- Previously known as Vernon Valley Summer Park, Mountain Creek Waterpark (1998–2013, 2016–present)
- Logo used from 1978 to 1996
- Interactive map of Action Park
- Location: Vernon, New Jersey, U.S.
- Coordinates: 41°11′26″N 74°30′27″W
- Status: Defunct
- Opened: May 26, 1978 (Original park); June 14, 2014 (Revived park)
- Closed: September 2, 1996 (Original park); May 29, 2016 (Revived park)
- Owner: Great American Recreation
- Slogan: Where You're the Center of the Action! There's Nothing in the World like Action Park
- Area: 250 acres (100 ha)
- Website: actionpark.com at the Wayback Machine (archived 1996-12-27)
- Replaced by: Mountain Creek Waterpark

Action Park was an amusement and water park located in Vernon Township, New Jersey, United States, on the grounds of the Vernon Valley/Great Gorge ski resort. The park consisted primarily of water-based attractions and originally opened to the public in 1978, under the ownership of Great American Recreation (GAR).

Action Park featured three separate attraction areas: the Alpine Center, Motorworld, and Waterworld. The latter was one of the first modern American water parks. Many of its attractions were unique, attracting thrill-seekers from across the New York metropolitan area.

While extremely popular, Action Park had a reputation for poorly designed rides, undertrained and underaged staff, intoxicated guests and staff, and a consequently poor safety record. At least six people are known to have died as a result of mishaps on rides at the park. Healthcare workers and locals had nicknamed the place "Traction Park", "Accident Park", "Class Action Park" and "Friction Park".

Little effort was made by state regulators to address those issues, despite the park's history of repeat violations. GAR's management resorted to illegal financial schemes to keep itself solvent, which led to indictments of its executives, some of whom, like founder Gene Mulvihill, pled guilty to some charges. In its later years, personal injury lawsuits led to the closure of increasing numbers of rides, and eventually the entire park in 1996.

In 1998, resort developer Intrawest announced the purchase of the majority of the Vernon Valley/Great Gorge ski area, including Action Park and other developable real estate lands that GAR had owned. The park received a massive overhaul, which included extensively renovating and repairing attractions, especially those deemed either outright unsafe or inappropriate relative to Intrawest's vision of the park, with some being removed entirely. Afterward, the park reopened as Mountain Creek Waterpark.

== History ==
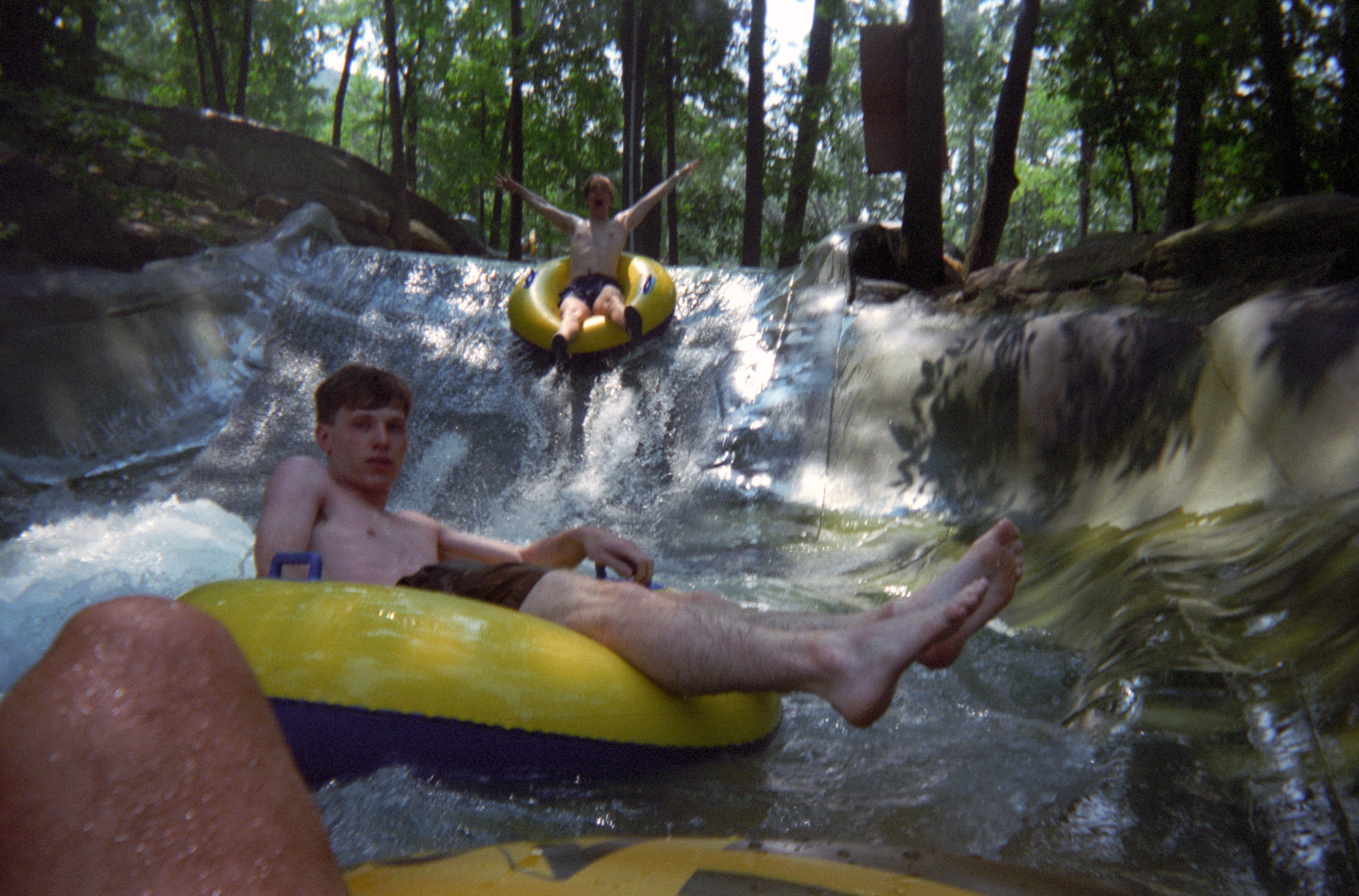
Mini-slide built into the side of a mountain

In 1976, Eugene Mulvihill and his company, Great American Recreation (GAR), the owners of the recently combined Vernon Valley/Great Gorge ski area in Vernon Township, New Jersey, wanted to make money during the summer off-season. Following the example of other ski areas, they opened a 2,700-foot (820 m) alpine slide down one of the steep ski trails. For the summer of 1978, Mulvihill added two water slides and a go-kart track, and named the collection of rides the "Vernon Valley Summer Park". Action Park was formally opened on July 4 of that year, with two opening-day promotions: a Dolly Parton look-alike contest and a tobacco juice–spitting contest.

The following year, more water slides and a small deep-water swimming pool, as well as tennis courts and a softball field, were added to what became known as the Waterworld section of Action Park. By 1980, Motorworld had been carved out of swamplands the ski area owned across State Route 94. Combined, the park's 250 acres (100 ha) formed one of North America's earliest modern water parks. It evolved into a major destination with 75 rides (35 motorized, self-controlled rides and 40 water slides).

"Gene didn't want to do the same old shit, where you just get strapped into something or it twirls around," Andy Mulvihill, later the park's head lifeguard, recalls of his father's philosophy in creating Action Park.

"He wanted to take the idea of skiing, which is exhilarating because you control the action, and transfer it to an amusement park. There's inherent risk in that, but that's what makes it fun."

Action Park's most successful years were the early and mid-1980s. Most rides were still operating, and the park's dangerous reputation had not yet developed. In 1982, two guests died at the park within a week of each other, leading to the permanent closure of one ride. Despite this, people continued to come in massive numbers. The park's fortunes began to turn with two more deaths in the summer of 1984, and the legal and financial problems that stemmed from the ensuing lawsuits. (Note: Mulvihill's policy was never to settle suits, and only pay compensation to injured patrons following a judgement against the park and (typically) a determined collection effort on the plaintiff's part.) A state investigation of misconduct in the leasing of state land to Action Park led to a 110-count grand jury indictment against the nine related companies that ran the park and their executives for operating an unauthorized insurance company. Many took pretrial intervention to avoid prosecution; Gene Mulvihill pleaded guilty that November to five insurance fraud–related charges.

Action Park entertained over a million visitors per year during the 1980s, with as many as 12,000 coming on some of the busiest weekends. Park officials said this made the injury and death rate statistically insignificant. Nevertheless, the director of the emergency room at a nearby hospital said they treated from five to ten victims of park accidents on some of the busiest days, and the park eventually bought the township extra ambulances to keep up with the volume. In September 1989, GAR negotiated a deal with International Broadcasting Corporation (IBC) that would result in the sale of Vernon Valley/Great Gorge, and Action Park, for $50 million. IBC later backed out of the deal, feeling the site was not suitable for their needs upon further inspections of the properties.

In September 1991, GAR petitioned the township committee to put a referendum on the November ballot that, if passed, would have legalized the operation of games of skill and chance at Action Park. The effort failed because only 643 of the 937 signatures on the petition came from registered voters.

A few rides were closed and dismantled due to costly settlements and rising insurance premiums in the 1990s, (Note: In 2000 one litigant alleged in court filings that 2,400 injury claims had been filed against GAR.) and the park's attendance began to suffer as a recession early in that decade reduced the number of visitors. Action Park was still advertised as the world's largest water park.

In early 1995, GAR operated Vernon Valley/Great Gorge and Action Park with no liability insurance. New Jersey did not require it, and GAR found it more economical to go to court than purchase liability insurance, since they relied on their own self-insurance. However, they ultimately purchased liability insurance from Evanston Insurance Company in May of that year to cover Action Park and the skiing facilities. As 1995 progressed, GAR's financial woes continued to accumulate. First Fidelity Bank, which lent $19 million to GAR and some 15 other connected corporations, filed suit against them in an effort to begin the process of foreclosing on the debt owed to them. Law firms owed money for services rendered between 1991 and 1993 also began filing suit. As November approached, GAR negotiated a deal with Noramco Capital Corp. and the Praedium Fund of CS First Boston, in which they would purchase the debt owed to First Fidelity, temporarily fending off an impending foreclosure.

In February 1996, the creditors who had taken on GAR's $14 million debt petitioned to force it into bankruptcy. GAR filed for Chapter 11 protection that following March, but remained optimistic that they could regain their financial footing "within a year". After closing at the end of the season as usual on Labor Day 1996, it launched a website where visitors could find information about rides, directions to the park, lodging, and enter a lottery for park tickets.

As the 1997 summer season approached, GAR remained optimistic that Action Park would open as expected on June 14, in spite of massive layoffs at the end of the prior ski season. The opening date was pushed back two weeks, and then into mid-July. On June 25, GAR announced the cessation of all its operations, including Action Park.

Following the demise of GAR, Praedium Recovery Fund purchased the Vernon Valley/Great Gorge resort, including Action Park, for $10 million. The investment group put Angel Projects in charge of managing the resort, and aimed to spend $20 million to upgrade the ski resort's equipment and trails and remodel the water park. Instead, Canadian resort developer Intrawest purchased the property in February 1998. It revamped the Waterworld section of Action Park, and reopened it for the 1998 season as Mountain Creek Waterpark, while the Alpine Center section had its bungee tower demolished, and Space Shot ride dismantled. The Motorworld section of the park remained in place, undisturbed, until at least mid-2000, when work began on Mountain Creek's Black Creek Sanctuary.

== Alpine Center attractions ==
=== Action Park Gladiator Challenge ===
The Gladiator Challenge attraction, loosely based on the television series American Gladiators, opened in 1992. It allowed guests to compete against other guests in an obstacle course and against park-employed "gladiators" in jousting matches. Former bodybuilders Michael and Vince Mancuso designed the attraction, and the employees against whom guests would compete in the jousting matches were found by scouting local gyms.

The matches could lead to real violence. On one occasion, a guest who felt the gladiator he contended against had been too rough, striking him frequently on the head with the padded end of his pugil stick, returned to the attraction with some of his friends in an effort to exact retribution. The gladiator called in support of his own, and eventually, a brawl involving several dozen people broke out. The Vernon police had to be called in to restore order.

Over the course of a day, three shows were put on, and the guests who ran the fastest obstacle course times in the earlier shows were brought back to compete against each other later in the day. By 1995, the attraction was removed and replaced with a beach volleyball court.

=== Alpine slide ===
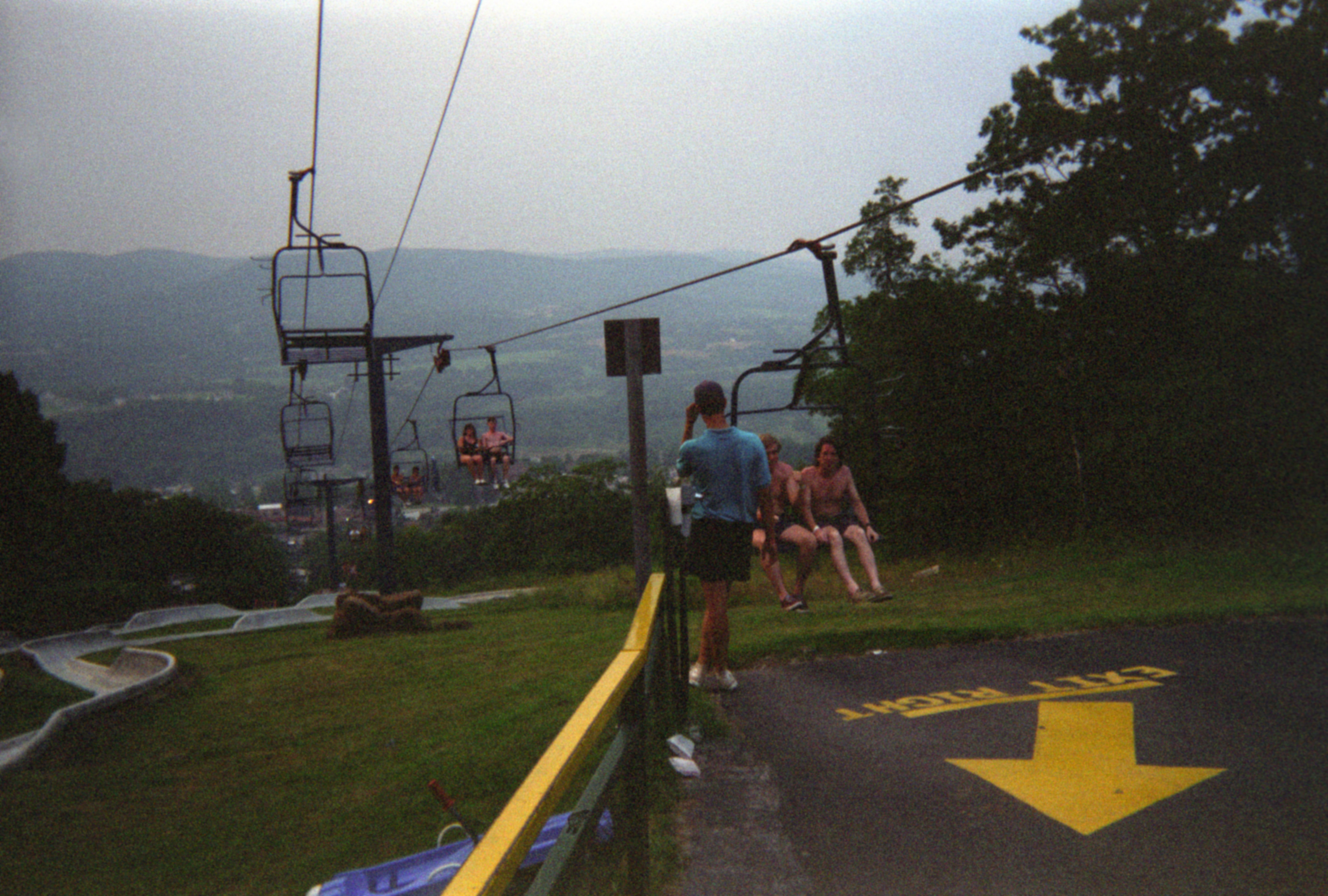
Chairlift to alpine slide

Action Park's 2,700-foot-long (820 m) alpine slide descended the mountain beneath one of the ski area's chairlifts, which provided guests access to the top of the slide. The path underneath the chairlift resulted in verbal harassment and spitting from passengers going up for their turn. Guests riding the lift would also often knock the sleds off, slowing down operations as employees had to retrieve them.

Riders sat on small sleds that had only a brake/accelerator control stick and rode down the slide in long chutes built into the slope. The ride, and more specifically the sleds, became notorious for causing injuries. The stick that was supposed to control the sled's speed in practice offered just two options on the infrequently maintained vehicles: extremely slow, and a speed described by one former employee as "death awaits". The chutes in which the sleds traveled were made of concrete, fiberglass, and asbestos, which led to severe abrasions on riders who took even mild falls. The tendency of guests to ride in bathing suits made the problem worse. Hay bales at the curves were put in place in an attempt to cushion the impact of guests whose sleds jumped the track, a frequent occurrence.

While park officials regularly asserted its safety, the slide was responsible for the bulk of the accidents, injuries, lawsuits, and state citations for safety violations in the early years of the park. According to state records, in 1984 and 1985, the alpine slide produced 14 fractures and 26 head injuries. The slide was the site of the first fatality at the park, occurring in 1980: 19-year-old George Larsson Jr., who, contrary to the reports at the time, had not previously been a ski-lift operator at Vernon Valley. Rather, the teenager was a member of the public who was thrown from the slide when his brake failed and car jumped the track. Tumbling down the mountain at high velocity, his head struck a formation of rocks the park had been previously told to remove. After several days in a coma, he died. Action Park said it was nighttime and raining the night the accident happened; they also claimed Larsson was an employee and as such the death did not need to be reported to state regulators. Larsson's mother and brother in Class Action Park said he had never worked as an employee at the park and that it was an entirely fabricated story they believe to take the heat off of the parks reputation and to avoid of having to report his death. Years later, employees noted that the inspectors had already ordered the rocks to be removed but never returned to make sure the order was carried out.

When Intrawest reopened the water park as Mountain Creek in spring 1998, they announced the slide would remain open for one final season, but riders were required to wear helmets and kneepads. The last day of the slide's operation was September 6 of that year, the day before the park closed for the season, as that year's Labor Day was rainy and the slide had to be closed. The chutes were torn out afterward, but the route can still be seen from the gondola that replaced the chairlift. The resort's mountain-bike route travels down the site and crosses over a few wooden footbridges that provided access over the alpine slide. In 2012, Mountain Creek introduced an alpine coaster, which combines elements of an alpine slide and a roller coaster.

=== Bailey Ball ===
The Bailey Ball was an Alpine Center attraction developed and tested, but never opened to the public, as a result of those tests. It consisted of a large steel sphere in which a rider could be secured and then rolled downward. The plan was to use a track made of PVC pipe as a guide for the ball, and one was built alongside a ski trail.

The designers failed to take into account the tendency of PVC pipe to expand in heat. The first test was conducted on a hot summer day with a state inspector present. The ball, with a man inside testing it, went off the track as a result of the pipe expansion. It bounded down the adjacent ski slope, continued through the parking lot and across Route 94, and came to rest in a swamp. Once the ball had stopped, the inspector left without saying anything, and park management abandoned the project.

=== Snapple Snap-Up Whipper Snapper Ride ===
In 1991, Action Park opened up a 70-foot-tall (21 m), two-station bungee jumping tower near the alpine slide. During news media coverage of the ride's opening, Andy Mulvihill pushed a television reporter who refused to make the jump off the platform, at the direction of his older sister, then head of public relations for the park. The next summer, the tower was upgraded to four jumping stations. Guests could not drop very far, and were tethered to a weight that prevented them from bouncing back up to the top of the tower. The attraction closed with the park in 1996.

=== Skateboard park ===
A skatepark briefly existed near the ski area's ski-school building, but closed after one season due to poor design. Bowls were separated by pavement, which in many cases did not meet the edges smoothly. Former park employee Tom Fergus was quoted in the magazine Weird NJ as saying that the "skate park was responsible for so many injuries we covered it up with dirt and pretended it never existed".

=== Transmobile ===
The Transmobile was a monorail that took riders from the Alpine Center across Route 94 to the Cobblestone Village shopping complex and the park's Motorworld section. Riders sat sideways in cars built for two people. Each stop had two stations: one for guests heading towards the Alpine Center, and one for guests heading to Motorworld. Rides were one-way, and riders were not allowed to stay on the ride and travel round-trip without getting off at either end, which sometimes caused conflicts between park staff and riders, who either did not understand or did not want to follow the rules. Much of the Transmobile was dismantled when Intrawest took over the park in 1998. However, the Cobblestone Village station remains in place, as does the right-of-way through the village's miniature golf course.

== Motorworld ==
Action Park's Motorworld section consisted of rides based around powered vehicles and boats on the west side of Route 94, opposite the central part of the park. This area closed with Action Park in 1996 and never reopened; it has since been replaced with a condominium development, a restaurant, and additional parking for the Mountain Creek ski resort.

=== Land rides ===
- Super Go Karts allowed guests to drive around a small loop track at a speed around 20 miles per hour (32 km/h), controlled by the governor devices on the karts. However, park employees knew how to circumvent the governors by wedging tennis balls into them, and they were known to do so for guests. As a result, an otherwise standard small-engine kart ride became an opportunity to play bumper cars at 50 mph (80 km/h), resulting in many injuries from head-on collisions. Also, the karts' engines were poorly maintained and gasoline fumes overcame some riders as they drove.
- Lola Cars were miniature open-cockpit race cars on a longer track. Extra money was charged to drive them, and they, too, could be adjusted for speed by park employees, with similarly harmful consequences to riders. Former employees have said that after park management briefly set up a microbrewery nearby, employees would break into the brewery, steal the beer, and then take the cars out and ride them on Route 94.
- Battle Action Tanks was one of the most popular rides in Motorworld, and it was featured prominently in television ads. For an additional fee, guests could enter a chainlink fence-enclosed area and operate small tanks for five minutes at a time. The tanks were equipped with tennis ball cannons that enabled riders to shoot at a sensor prominently mounted on each tank. If hit, the tank stopped operating for 15 seconds, while other guests often took advantage of the delay to hit the disabled vehicle with more fire. Visitors on the outside could also use less costly cannons mounted on the perimeter fence. When workers had to enter the cage to attend to a stuck or crashed tank, which often happened several times a day, they were commonly pelted with tennis balls, despite prohibitions against such behavior; one guest poured lighter fluid on a tennis ball and ignited it before firing, earning him an ejection. This gave the ride a reputation for being more dangerous for the employees than the guests, making it one of the least-popular places to work in the park. Whether any serious injuries occurred from the tank ride is unknown. As of 2018, the area has not been redeveloped, and only a vacant lot remains.

=== Watercraft rides ===
- The Super Speedboats were set up in a small pond, known by park staff to be heavily infested with snakes. They could be driven around a small island at 35–40 mph (56–64 km/h). Unlike the land vehicles, no way was known to tamper with them and increase their speed. Still, many riders nonetheless used them to play bumper boats, and one seriously inebriated rider had to be rescued by the attendant lifeguard after his boat capsized following a collision.
- Bumper Boats was a supposedly safer ride than the Super Speedboats, but the engines often leaked gasoline, at least once requiring medical attention for one rider who got too much of it on his skin. Tall riders were also usually unable to fit their legs into the small-sized boats, resulting in them hanging off the sides of the boats and being fractured during collisions.

=== Air rides ===
- The Space Shot attraction was a tower drop ride, common in many amusement parks. This ride was opened for the park's final season in 1996, and again under Mountain Creek management in 1998. In July 1998, the ride was purchased by the Six Flags-owned La Ronde theme park in Montreal, Quebec.
- Sling Shot was a bungee-cord ride in which two riders sat in a seat and were strapped in while the ride was shot up in the air and supported by a bungee cord. Riders looped upside down. A few similar rides are still standing in a handful of major amusement parks, the most common name being the Slingshot found at many Six Flags parks. For insurance issues, the Sling Shot was an upcharge attraction (an additional admission charge), costing guests $5. This particular ride was open from 1993 to 1995. "We often wondered how many whiplash cases came out of that ride", one former employee recalled.

== Waterworld ==
Water-based attractions made up half of the park's rides and accounted for the greatest share of its casualty count. Mountain Creek Waterpark and its currently revived Action Park still operate some of these attractions. It also had a miniature golf course, standard pools, and rides for children. These were sometimes smaller, safer versions of the park's main attractions.

=== Cannonball Loop ===
Cannonball Loop, the infamous looping water slide, was only opened for brief periods in Action Park's existence.

In 1983, GAR built an enclosed water slide with a complete vertical loop at the end, similar to that of a roller coaster. The resulting slide, called the "Cannonball Loop", was so intimidating that employees have reported they were offered $100 (equivalent to $299 in 2025) to test it. Fergus, who described himself as "one of the idiots" who took the offer, said, "$100 did not buy enough booze to drown out that memory."

The slide was open for only a month in 1985 before it was closed at the order of the state's Advisory Board on Carnival Amusement Ride Safety, a highly unusual move at the time. One worker told a local newspaper that "there were too many bloody noses and back injuries" from riders. Some early riders came back with lacerations to their bodies, whose cause was later determined to be teeth that had been knocked out of riders' mouths and become lodged in the interior walls. A former Navy physician found that riders were experiencing as much as nine Gs of acceleration as they went through the loop.

A story widely rumored and reported in Weird NJ was that some of the test dummies sent down before it opened had been dismembered and decapitated. Gene Mulvihill's son Andy confirmed that to The New York Times in 2019. He was the first live person to test the ride afterwards, which he did wearing a full set of ice hockey protective equipment. "The Cannonball Loop was not fun", he recalled later. "It was more like a ride you ride to survive than to have fun."

A rider also reportedly got stuck at the top of the loop due to insufficient water pressure, and a hatch had to be installed at the bottom of the slope to allow for future extractions. Those who rode the Cannonball Loop have said that more safety measures were taken than was otherwise common at the park. Riders were weighed, hosed down with cold water, instructed to remove jewelry, and then carefully instructed in how they had to position their bodies to complete the ride.

The ride reopened a few more times over the years. In the summers of 1995 and 1996, it was opened for several days before further injuries forced its permanent shutdown. For the remainder of the park's existence, Cannonball Loop remained visible near the entrance of Waterworld. It was dismantled shortly after the park closed.

In 2014, video footage that appeared to show riders going down the Cannonball Loop was unearthed and published online. In 2015, Action Park planned to debut another water slide, the "Sky Caliber" developed by Sky Turtle Technologies, which would encase riders inside a bullet-like capsule for a 90-foot (27 m) vertical drop and a 30-foot (9.1 m) loop, at 50 mph (80 km/h) and 6 Gs.

=== Other notable water attractions ===
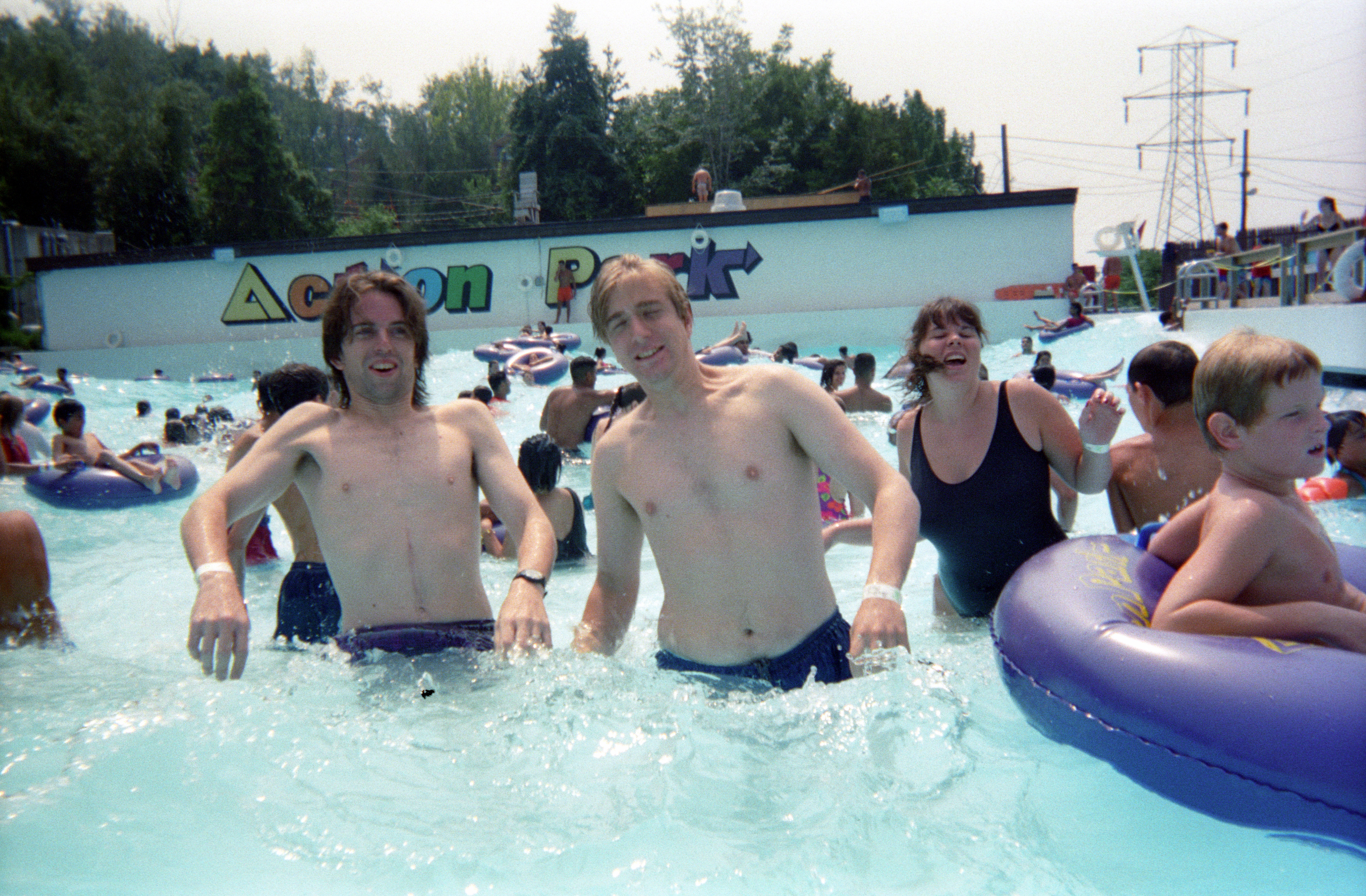
Less buoyant chlorinated water made the wave pool harder to swim in than salt water in the ocean.

- The Tidal Wave Pool was opened at the beginning of Action Park's 1981 season. The first death in the pool occurred in 1982; another visitor drowned in this common water-park attraction five years later. It was, however, the number of people the lifeguards saved from a similar fate that made this the only Waterworld attraction to gain its own nickname, "The Grave Pool".
  - The pool was 100 feet (30 m) wide by 250 feet (76 m) long and could hold 500 to 1,000 people. Waves were generated for 20 minutes at a time with 10-minute breaks and could reach as much as 40 inches (1.0 m) in height. It was not always obvious that pool depth increased near the far end, and some patrons only remembered or realized that they could not swim when they were in over their heads and the waves were going full blast. Even those who could swim sometimes exhausted themselves, causing patrons to crowd the side ladders as the waves began, leading to many accidents. Twelve lifeguards were on duty at all times, and on high-traffic weekends they were known to rescue as many as 30 people, compared to the one or two rescues the average lifeguard might make in a typical season at a pool or lake. "It was legitimately scary", one of the lifeguards recalled.
  - Mountain Creek continues to operate this attraction as the "High Tide Wavepool", but has made the pool much shallower.
- On the Aqua Skoot, invented by Ken Bailey in the early 1980s, riders would carry a hard, solid plastic sled up to the top of the ride, go down a slide consisting of rollers akin to those found in factories, warehouses, or assembly lines, and end up in a pool that in most areas was no deeper than a puddle. The idea of the ride was, once the sled hit the water, to skip across the water like a stone. To do this, the rider had to be in a certain position, leaning back. If the rider were not in this position, the sled would sink into the water as soon as it hit the pool, flinging the rider off head-first, which often resulted in head injuries (conversely, a rider who leaned back in 1995 overdid it and suffered serious head injuries falling off the back of the sled, one of many to whom this happened, according to former employees). Other times, riders would be leaving the pool only to have others crash into them as they were riding. This ride consisted of parallel slides originally. At some point in the mid-1980s, a third slide was added. Each slide was 30 feet (9.1 m) long. The slides were removed when Intrawest took over the resort in 1998; the pool was redesigned into the Lost Island River, which is part of the children's section. The platform/tower riders climbed to ride the Aqua Skoot became the Treetop Cabanas in 2003.
- Kamikaze was the more "tame" water slide near the Geronimo slides. It was blue and featured several drops and rises. Riders would lie on their backs with their arms and legs crossed and go down a "chute" that pitched steeply at first and then went up and down several times before ending in a pool. It survived the Mountain Creek redesign but was removed and scrapped following the 2009 season.
- The Kayak Experience was an imitation whitewater course that used submerged electric fans to agitate the water above. Frequently, the kayaks got stuck or tipped over, and people had to get out of them to remedy the situation. In 1982, a man died while trying to get back in his kayak when he touched the open wiring of the fans, sending him into cardiac arrest and leading to its permanent closure.

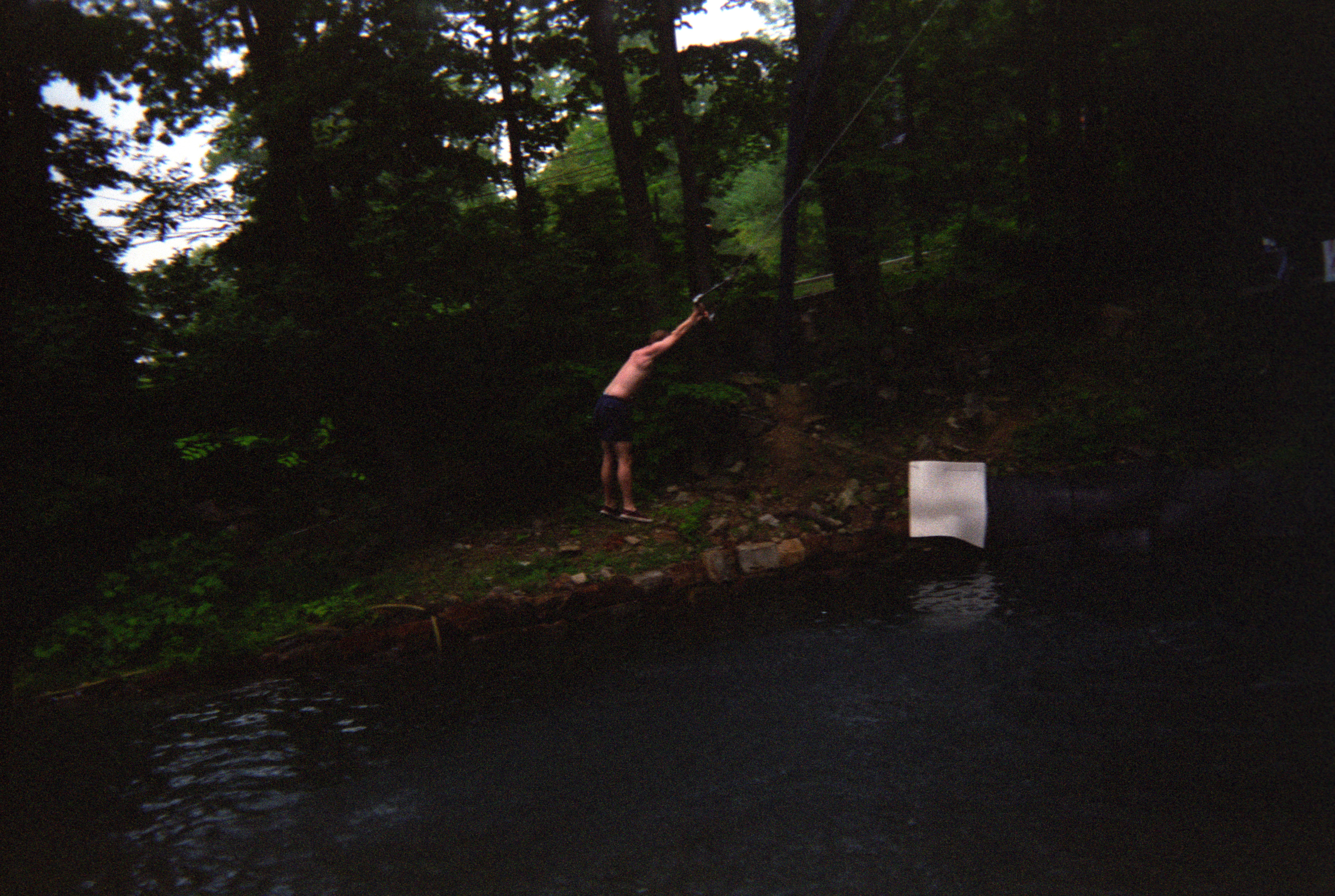
Taking the Tarzan swing into a cold pool.

- The Tarzan Swing was a steel arch hanging from a 20-foot-long (6.1 m) cable over a spring-fed pool. Patrons waited in long lines for the chance to hang from it, swing out over the water, then jump off as the beam reached its height. In the park's early years, the area where patrons jumped from was not over the water, but a cushioned area. Some people who let go as soon as they started their swing would land on the cushion and then slide/crash into the water. In the mid-1980s, the starting position was shifted so that patrons started over the water. Some patrons hung on too long and scraped their toes on the concrete at the far side. Others used the ride properly, but were then surprised to find out the water underneath was freezing. It was cold enough, in fact, that the lifeguards sometimes had to rescue people who were so surprised by the sudden chill that they could not swim out of the pool. In 1984, one man died from a heart attack after experiencing the swing.
- Roaring Rapids was a standard raft-based whitewater ride. Reports that the park filed with the state in 1984 noted fractured femurs, collar bones, and noses, and dislocated knees and shoulders. This attraction is still open. The left side is known as The Gauley, and riders use a single tube. The right side is known as Thunder Run, and is a double-tube rafting ride.
- Surf Hill, common to other water parks at the time, allowed patrons to slide down a water-slick sloped surface on mats into small puddles until they reached a foam barrier after an upslope at the end. Barriers between lanes were minimal, and people frequently collided with each other on the way down or at the end. The seventh lane was known as the "backbreaker", due to its special kicker two-thirds of the way down, intended to allow jumps and splashdowns into a larger puddle. Employees at the park used to like eating at a nearby snack bar with a good view of the attraction, since it was almost guaranteed that they could see some serious injuries, lost bikini tops, or both; Gene Mulvihill had built viewing space for this purpose shortly after opening the ride. Mountain Creek kept this attraction open through 2005, then reopened it in 2012.
- Super Speed Water Slides, also known as Geronimo Falls, were two slides set slightly apart from the rest of the park and took advantage of nearly vertical slopes to allow riders to attain higher speeds than usually possible. One started with riders going almost vertically downwards and was covered with screening for the first several feet. As barriers on the side of the slides were very low, lifeguards reminded every user to remain flat on their backs with their arms at their sides as they descended, since there was no possible way to ride it otherwise and stay on. The fall from both slides had the potential for very serious injury. Those who made it to the bottom found their progress arrested by water—which made an enormous splash—and then a small pool. Only one of these slides remains today, and the track was replaced with one that was not as steep. The tracks the old slides followed are still visible. Today, it is known as the H-2-Oh-No. Vertigo and Vortex, two adjacent enclosed tube slides, still use the same end splash pool that two of the other old speed slides used.
- The area around Roaring Rapids was (and still is) laid out like a kind of grotto, with many lower-intensity attractions. One was a pair of diving cliffs—one 23 feet (7.0 m), the other 18 feet (5.5 m)—above a 16-foot-deep (4.9 m) pool. However, the pool below was not blocked off from those who might be swimming in or away from other attractions, and nothing at water level gave any indication to swimmers below that they could expect people to dive in right next to them—or right on top of them. The sole lifeguard on duty often had their hands full dealing with the results of those collisions. Also, nonswimmers would jump off the cliffs, not fully appreciating how deep the water below was, and have to be rescued. Former employee Tom Fergus says the bottom of the pool was eventually painted white to make it easier to spot any bodies on the bottom. The large pool into which people jumped is no longer used for regular swimming, only for depositing used tubes.

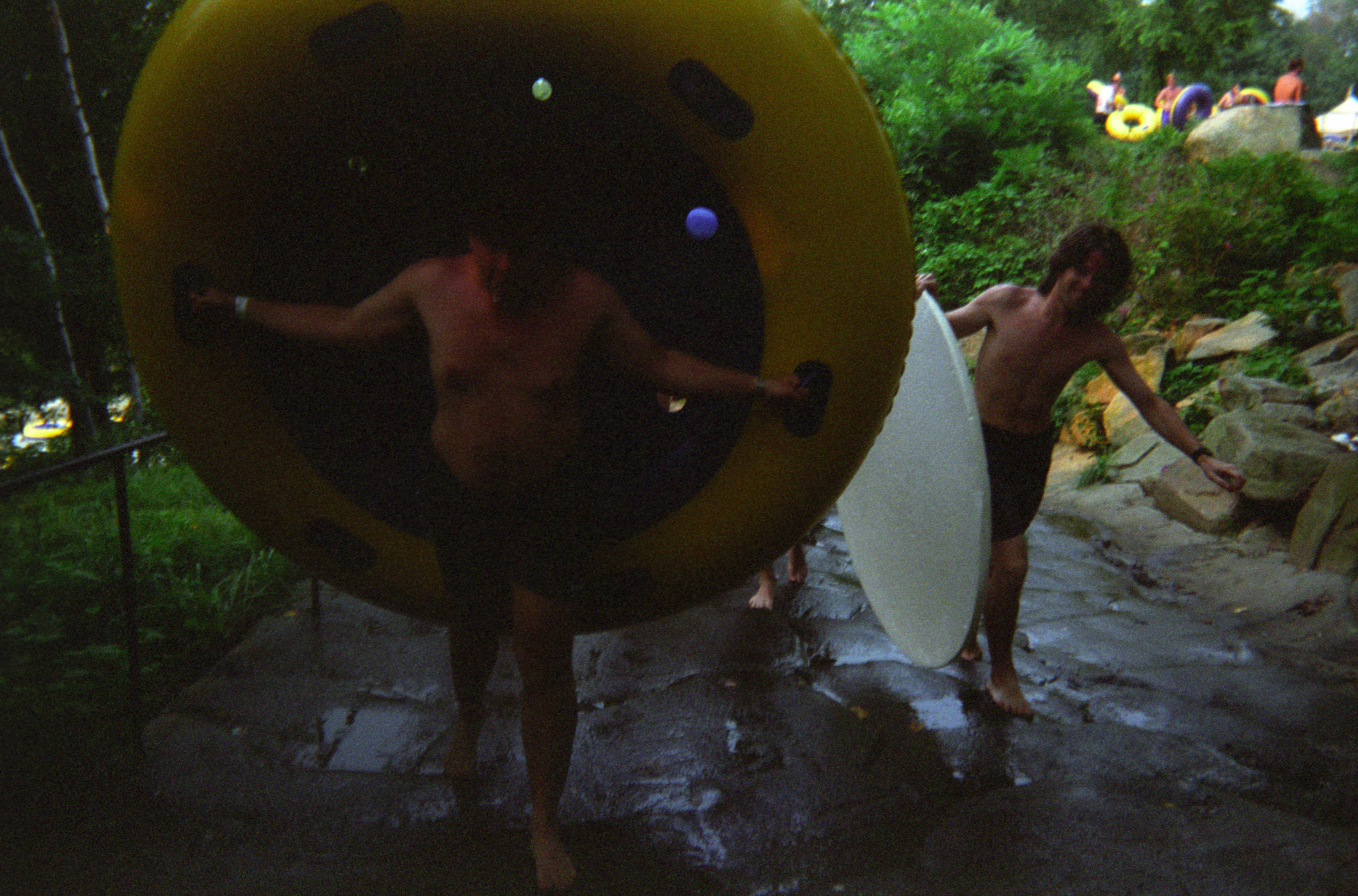
Carrying tubes up the mountain.

- The Colorado River Ride, which still exists, is a two-person raft ride that winds its way down a heavily wooded area on the side of the park, with numerous forks allowing riders to take different routes. Unlike in other parks, the river trough was crafted to look like a natural riverbed, with jets in the bed at various points adding to the rapid roughness. Riders carried their rafts from the bottom of the ride up to the starting point. Once on the ride, they would travel down a short incline, propelling them down the ride. As they made it past the first turn, gaining speed was common. After a few turns, the riders would come to a fork.
  - At the Main Fork, riders would pass under a drenching waterfall into a dark tunnel with many twists, turns, and jagged rocks. Upon exiting the tunnel, riders would twist and turn some more until they reached a small rock pool, and slowly float out. The final stretch of the river consisted of a large downhill portion complete with bumps, and a 1-foot-high (30 cm) jump where the rafts would momentarily catch air and then slam back onto the surface.
  - At the Alternative Forks, riders would float along a relatively smooth path until they rounded a corner with a waterfall, and another fork. One path would take riders back to the main path and dump them at the tunnel's end. The other fork would reconnect with the main path before the rock pool. Originally, a fork carried riders down a set of steep drops, before a curved drop into the main path right at the end. In the late 1980s, this path was merged into the main pathway, creating the rock pool, and final hill, that are still in use today. Today, the first fork is closed off, but the points where the forks reconnect to the main path are still connected to the ride.
  - Originally, riders rode this attraction two at a time, in yellow inflatable dinghies. This was later replaced with large, circular, four-person rafts (in the Mountain Creek era, a lift was put in place that carried rafts to the beginning, eliminating the need for riders to carry them up the hill). Because the ride trough was designed to look and feel like an actual riverbed, the ride was rough. Not uncommonly, people would hit heads with the other riders, or the rafts would climb the walls after hitting them at high speed; this led to requiring riders to wear football helmets. A rider recounted to Weird NJ how a friend's mother suffered a broken nose when their raft was thrown into a rock wall. On the curve before the first fork, rafts commonly got stuck, requiring riders to jump out and push the raft or wait for the raft behind them to hit them. The collisions between rafts sometimes led to fistfights among patrons. Inside the tunnel were jagged rocks, which could cause cuts or scrapes if riders placed their hands out.

=== The Aerodium ===
The Aerodium is a skydiving simulator wind tunnel invented in Germany in 1984. In 1987, Action Park built and opened its own Aerodium in the Waterworld section of the park, becoming the first American amusement park to open one. The attraction was operated by Aerodium Inc., which acted as a concessionaire for the park through 1997. Stadium seating encircled the perimeter of the Aerodium, allowing friends and spectators to watch riders fly. Riders wearing a special skydiving suit, helmet, and earplugs would join the bodyflight instructor one by one on a trampoline-like netting directly over the fan. The instructor would grab each rider's wrists and guide the rider to fall forward, allowing the fan to lift the rider skyward. After a few seconds of flight, the attendant operating the fan would cut the power, causing the rider to fall onto the air cushions surrounding the fan. Park guests' flights were limited to a maximum of 6 or 7 feet (1.8 or 2.1 m) above the ground, about 1 to 2 feet (30 to 60 cm) over the instructor's head.

== Factors contributing to the park's safety record ==
A range of factors contributed to accidents at the park, from the design and construction of the rides themselves to the makeup of both visitors and staff, and lax government oversight.

=== Ride design ===
Action Park and its defenders often pointed out that it was one of the first water parks in the nation, pioneering ideas that were later widely copied. This meant that visitors were using rides that had not been tested through practical use for very long. Ride designers may have had insufficient training in physics or engineering. "They seemed to build rides," one attendee recalled, "not knowing how they would work, and [then let] people on them."

GAR, as its legal troubles would suggest, was accused of cutting corners to maximize its profits. For example, it was accused of building rides cheaply, sporadically maintaining many of them, and failing to renovate rides to take advantage of later safety improvements to its ideas made by other facilities. These practices took place in a range of its operations, including customer safety. In the park's last year, it kept part of the ski area open despite being unable to obtain liability insurance. Class Action Park also reported that the park's restaurants often indulged in corner-cutting practices common in that industry, such as steaming hot dog buns stale enough to have hardened and dried so they would moisten and soften enough to appear fresh.

=== Employees ===
The vast majority of workers at Action Park, at least the ones regularly seen by visitors, were teenagers. Jim DeSaye, a security director for the park, said that he got that job at the age of 21, after having worked at the park for two years. His experience was not uncommon.

Training sessions were held, but were often not taken seriously by staff. In Class Action Park, one former employee recalls that sessions practicing the rescue of drowning victims were often pretexts for hazing. New hires often had to play the drowning victim, and after the training was over, or instead of training, were often abandoned in the water to get out themselves. Most employees were underage, undertrained, often under the influence of alcohol, and generally cared little for enforcing park rules and safety requirements. Height and weight-based restrictions were often ignored.

=== Visitors ===
Since it was closer and slightly cheaper than Six Flags Great Adventure, Action Park attracted many visitors from urban enclaves of the New York metropolitan area. Many of them were often from lower-income neighborhoods where they had few, if any, opportunities to swim, much less learn how. The park greatly overestimated their abilities, (Note: Employees were aware of the issue, often alerting their coworkers to risk-prone visitors with the acronym "CFS" for "can't fucking swim". In some cases, they were aware that the person had already had to be rescued from deep water once.) and this was a factor in many accidents, as well as the drownings, according to park officials. DeSaye faults management's decision to broaden the customer base by advertising in Spanish-language media as contributing to the accident rate, since few employees spoke Spanish and no written information was made available in that language.

The staff's indifference to many of the park's own rules led to a similarly lawless culture among visitors, who generally liked the high level of control they had over their experience; as an interviewee in Class Action Park put it, "In a world filled with no, Action Park became the land of yes." Those injured were often happy to accept complimentary passes for future visits as compensation. Accidents were usually deemed by park employees to be the fault of the riders. A state official lamented that many water-slide accidents were due to guests who, in blatant violation of an explicitly posted rule, often discarded their mats midway down the slide and waited at a turn for their friends so they could go down together.

Since many rides routed their lines so that those waiting could see every previous rider, many played to the audience with risque and bawdy behavior when it did finally come to be their turn. The Tarzan Swing, in particular, was known for outbursts of foul language and exhibitionism as people jumped off the swing in full view of the whole line behind them.

Physical altercations sometimes occurred between different groups of visitors or between visitors and staff. Collisions between rafts on the Colorado River ride sometimes resulted in fights, and a large-scale brawl that broke out at the Gladiator Challenge after a patron believed one of the gladiators had been overly rough with him required police intervention. The police were also called in on another occasion when a group of visiting bodybuilders threw lifeguards into the pool they were guarding, leading the lifeguards to bring in friends as reinforcements. Andy Mulvihill also recalls an occasion when a fight over alleged line jumping spilled outside the park, leading to one participant attempting to escape with an employee being driven home by her mother; the employee decided not to return to work afterwards.

=== Availability of alcohol on grounds ===
The park also sold beer in many kiosks on the grounds, with similarly relaxed enforcement of the drinking age as with other restrictions in the park. Doctors treating the injured often reported that many of them were intoxicated.

=== Lax regulatory climate ===
Despite many citations for safety violations between 1979 and 1986, including allowing minors to operate some rides and failing to report accidents (which was unique among New Jersey's amusement parks; it was later disclosed that the park only reported those accidents where someone had to be transported in an ambulance), an investigation by the New Jersey Herald, Sussex County's main daily newspaper, later found that the park was fined only once. It was also unique in that department in that all other amusement parks were fined for first offenses—except Action Park. When asked if some sort of special relationship existed between GAR and the state, a reporter for Vernon's local weekly said in Class Action Park that, as Sussex County's largest employer, Action Park received special treatment from the township government.

Some of the state's regulations failed to adequately address the situation. After the 1987 drowning, the Tidal Wave Pool reportedly was considered a pool by the state, not a ride. Under state regulations at the time, the company merely had to keep the water clean and make sure that certified lifeguards were on duty.

== Fatalities ==
Six people are known to have died directly or indirectly from rides at Action Park:

- July 8, 1980: 19-year-old George Larsson, Jr. was riding the Alpine Slide when his car jumped the track, and his head struck a rock. He was rushed to the hospital and died on July 16. Gene Mulvihill lied to reporters that Larsson was an employee, because a customer's death would have to be reported to the state. Though Larsson had been on the payroll of the neighboring ski resort owned by Mulvihill as a ski lift operator the prior season, he never worked at Action Park.
- July 24, 1982: George Lopez, a 15-year-old boy, drowned in the Tidal Wave Pool.
- August 1, 1982: Jeffrey Nathan, a 27-year-old man from Fair Lawn, New Jersey, got out of his tipped kayak on the Kayak Experience, to right it. While doing so, he stepped on a grate that was in contact with exposed live wiring for the underwater fans, and he suffered a severe electric shock, which sent him into cardiac arrest. Two of Nathan's relatives nearby when the accident occurred were also injured. Nathan was taken to a hospital in nearby Warwick, New York, where he died later of the shock-induced cardiac arrest. The park at first disputed that the electric current caused his death, saying no burns were found on his body, but the coroner responded that burns generally do not occur in a water-based electrocution. The ride was drained and closed for the investigation. Accounts differed as to the extent of the exposed wiring; the park said it was "just a nick", while others argued it was closer to 8 inches (20 cm). The state's Labor Department found that the fan was installed correctly and maintained and that no violations of safety laws or amusement-ride regulations had occurred. However, it also said that a 19−ampere electric current found to be flowing through a ground circuit three days after the incident suggested the presence of a level of current in the underwater fan's motor circuit, which could have caused bodily injury under certain circumstances. The park claimed it had been vindicated, although it never reopened the ride, saying that people would be afraid to go on it afterwards.
- 1984 (Date Unknown): A fatal heart attack suffered by one visitor was believed to have been triggered by the shock of the cold water in the pool beneath the Tarzan Swing. The water on the ride and in that swimming area was 50–60 °F (10–16 °C), while other water areas were in the 70–80 °F (21–27 °C) range, more typical of swimming pools. The Tarzan Swing and the Cannonball ride in this area were operated by spring water.
- August 27, 1984: Donald DePass, a 20-year-old from Brooklyn, drowned in the Cliff Dive Pool. In his 2020 book, Andy Mulvihill, Gene Mulvihill's son, describes lifeguards diving to look for DePass in the pool, which was 15 feet at its deepest. The murky water and dark-colored bottom made it impossible to spot DePass from the surface and made it difficult for lifeguards to locate him underwater. Andy describes how he joined the lifeguards in the search and eventually located DePass underwater and unconscious. However, EMTs were unsuccessful in reviving him after he was brought to the surface. The bottom of the pool was later painted white to make it easier to identify swimmers underwater.
- July 19, 1987: 18-year-old Gregory Grandchamps drowned in the Tidal Wave Pool.

== Legacy ==
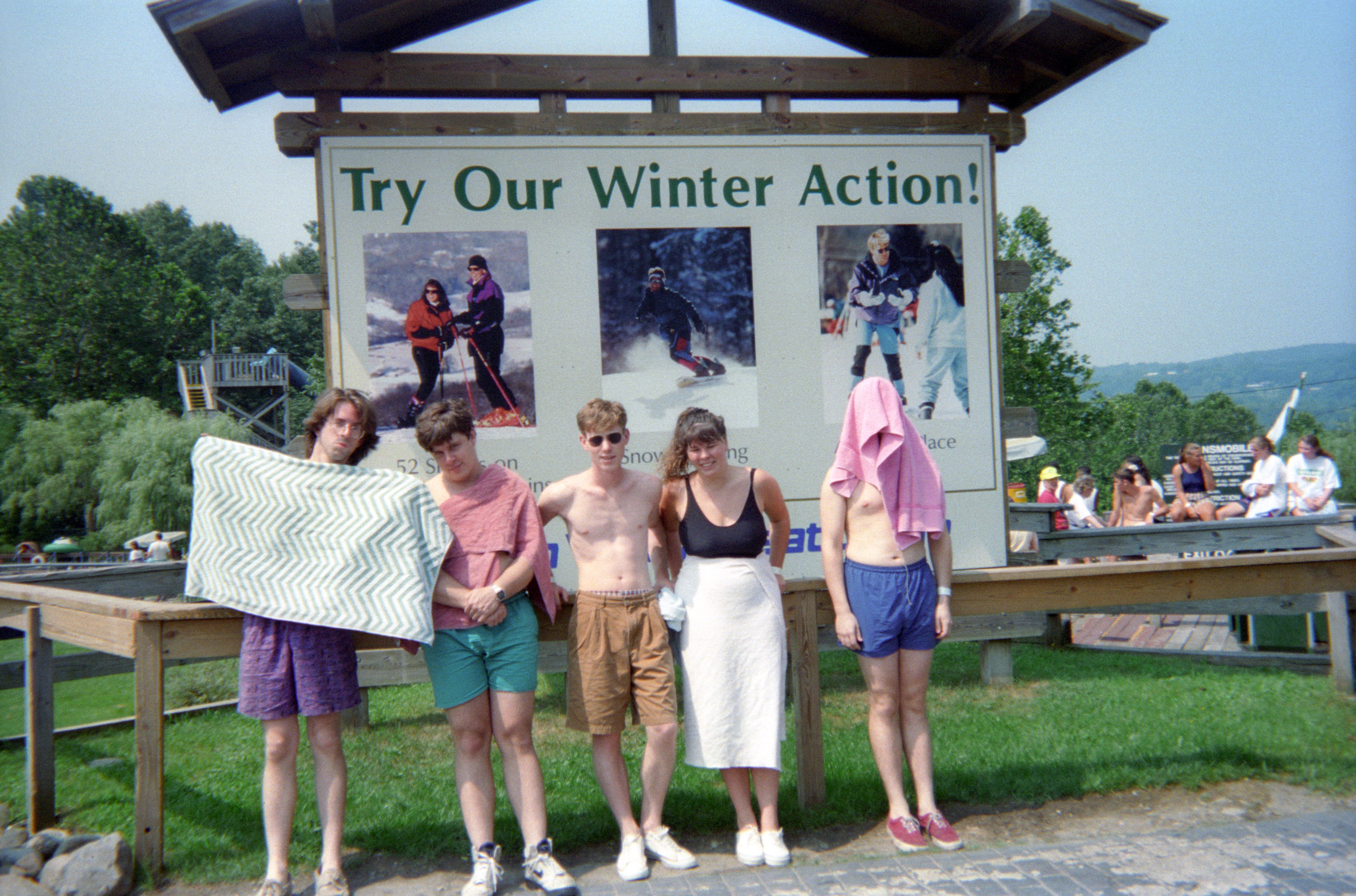
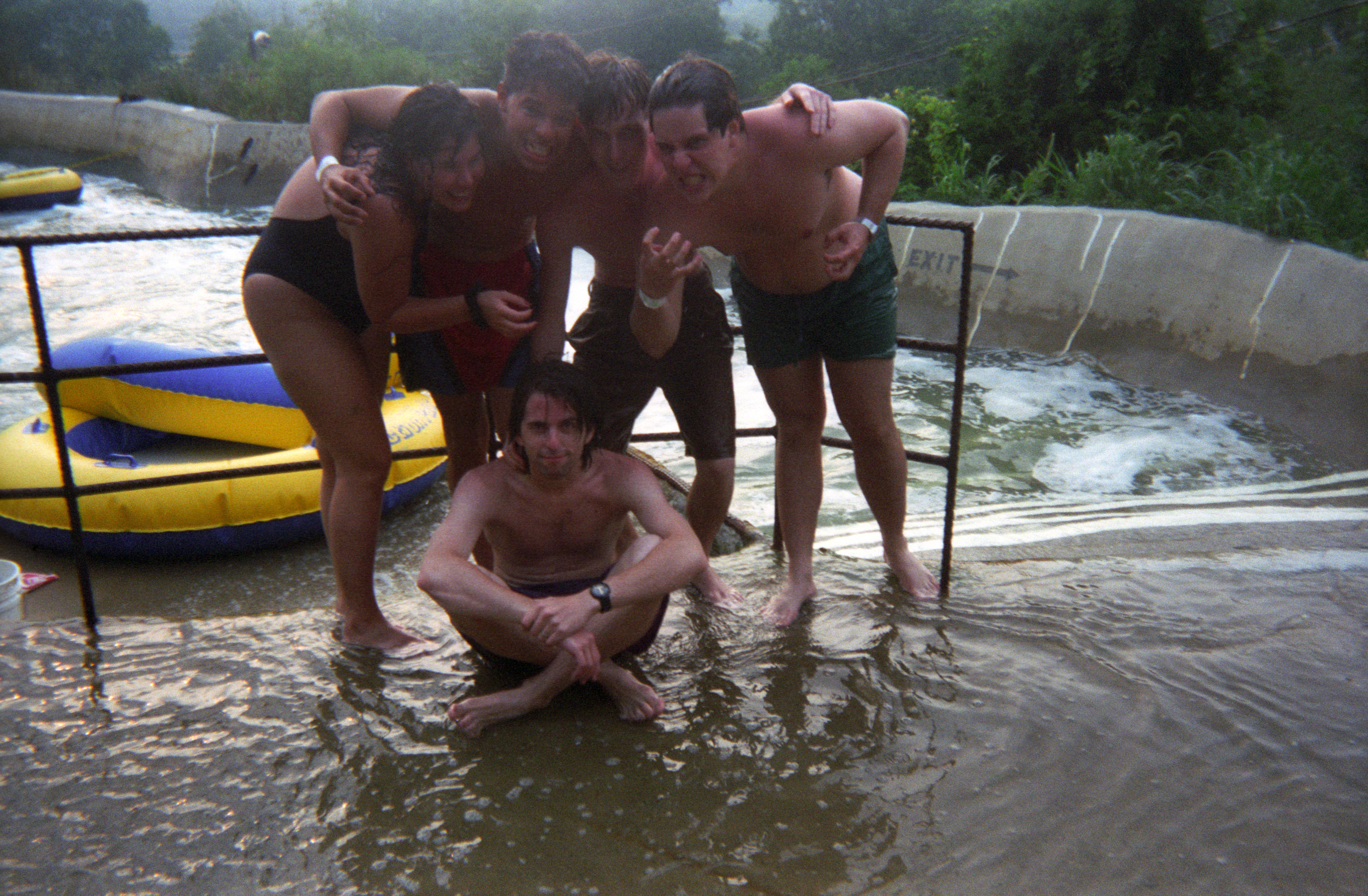
A group of acquaintances at Action Park in August 1994

Action Park was a cultural touchstone for many Generation X-ers who grew up in North and Central Jersey, as well as nearby locales in New York and Connecticut. A popular list of "You Know You're from New Jersey When ..." that circulates in email begins with, "You've been seriously injured at Action Park."

Some even credit the park for making them learn some difficult lessons. In 2000, Matthew Callan recalled Action Park thusly:

Action Park made adults of a generation of Tri-State area kids who strolled through its blood-stained gates, by teaching us the truth about life: It is not safe, you will get hurt a lot, and you'll ride all the way home burnt beyond belief.

Chris Gethard, a writer for Weird NJ and the associated book series, concurs:

Action Park was a true rite of passage for any New Jerseyan of my generation. When I get to talking about it with other Jerseyans, we share stories as if we are veterans who served in combat together. I suspect that many of us may have come closest to death on some of those rides up in Vernon Valley. I consider it a true shame that future generations will never know the terror of proving their grit at New Jersey's most dangerous amusement park.

== In popular media ==
The original version of the park's notoriety for its unsafe reputation inspired a film by Jackass creator and star Johnny Knoxville; filming started in March 2017 and wrapped in June 2017. The film was released under the title Action Point by Paramount Pictures on June 1, 2018.

Action Park is the subject of Mashable's documentary video, The Most Dangerous Theme Park in America (September 24, 2019). It is also the subject of the 2020 HBO documentary Class Action Park.

In 2020, it was announced that a comedy television series, told from Andy Mulvihill’s point of view, was in development at 20th Television and Hulu.

=== Literature ===
In 2020, a non-fiction book, called Action Park: Fast Times, Wild Rides, and the Untold Story of America's Most Dangerous Amusement Park, was published by both Andy Mulvihill and Jake Rossen as authors. It is distributed by Penguin Publishing Group.

== 2014 revival ==
In 2010, the whole Mountain Creek ski area and water park complex was sold to a group led by Eugene Mulvihill, the former owner of Great American Recreation and the owner of the adjacent Crystal Springs Resort; however, he died two years later. Under the new ownership, the name of the water park was changed back to Action Park, starting with the 2014 season. In 2016, the Mountain Creek Waterpark name was restored to the park, thus retiring the Action Park name again.

== Spinoff locations ==
=== Pocono Action Park and Motorworld ===
On April 14, 1980, Pocono Action Park Inc. was formed by GAR, which later opened Pocono Action Park and Motorworld. Located in the town of Tannersville, Pennsylvania, it had a Waterworld section with slides and tube rides, and a Motorworld section featuring many of the same racing-themed attractions—including Lola race cars and go-karts—as the Vernon park. By late 1991, the park was closed.

=== Action Mountain ===
In June 1984, Stony Point Recreation, a subsidiary of GAR, opened Action Mountain in Pine Hill, New Jersey. The park offered an alpine slide, go-karts, Lola race cars, bumper boats, speed slides, tube slides, swimming pools, and a diving platform. By 1986, Stony Point Recreation had accumulated $398,697 in back taxes owed to the town of Pine Hill, and in an effort to relieve the debt, sold off the park. In 1999, the site was redeveloped into the Pine Hill Golf Course.
