= Mountain Creek Waterpark =

Water park in Vernon, New Jersey

- Previously known as Action Park (1978–1996 and from 2014–2016)
- Interactive map of Mountain Creek Waterpark
- Location: Vernon, New Jersey, United States
- Coordinates: 41°11′26″N 74°30′27″W
- Status: Operating
- Opened: 1978 (as Action Park, first incarnation); 1998 (as Mountain Creek Waterpark, first incarnation); 2014 (as Action Park, modern incarnation); 2016 (as Mountain Creek Waterpark, second incarnation)
- Closed: 1996 (as Action Park); 2013 (as Mountain Creek Waterpark, first incarnation); 2016 (as Action Park)
- Owner: Mountain Creek
- Operating season: June to September
- Website: mountaincreek.com

Mountain Creek Waterpark is a water park located in Vernon, New Jersey, United States, on the grounds of the Mountain Creek ski resort. The park consists primarily of water-based attractions and opened in 1998. Its initial life as Action Park, one of the first modern American water parks, was open from 1978 until 1996 and became infamous for its poor safety record. At least six people are known to have died as a result of mishaps on rides at the original park. Despite this, the park was very popular and attracted thrill-seekers from across the New York metropolitan area.

On February 9, 1998, Intrawest announced the purchase of the majority of the Vernon Valley/Great Gorge ski area, including the Action Park property. After a massive overhaul, which included revamping rides and removing attractions deemed either outright unsafe or inappropriate relative to Intrawest's vision, the water park was reopened as Mountain Creek Waterpark. In 2010, the Mountain Creek ski area and waterpark was sold to a group led by Eugene Mulvihill, the former owner of Vernon Valley/Great Gorge and the owner of the adjacent Crystal Springs Resort. It was under the new ownership that the name of the water park was changed back to Action Park in 2014. Two years later, the name was reverted to Mountain Creek Waterpark.

== History ==
=== Action Park (1978–1996) ===
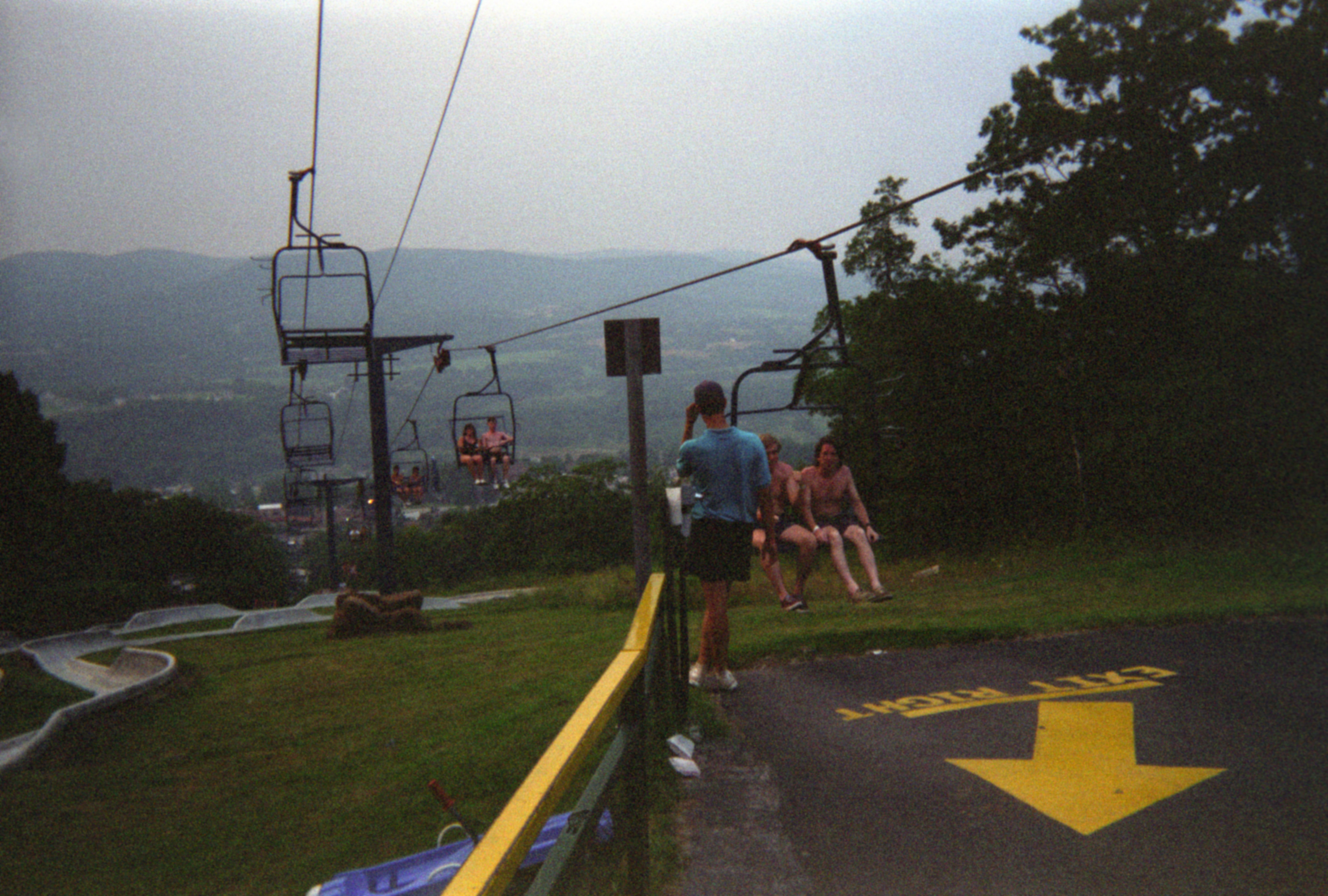
Chair lift to the top of the alpine slide, Action Park, August 1994.

The idea for the park began in 1976 when Eugene Mulvihill and his company, Great American Recreation, the owners of the recently combined Vernon Valley/Great Gorge ski area, wanted to find a way to generate revenue during the summer, so they opened a 2,700-foot-long (820 m) alpine slide down one of the steep ski trails. For the summer of 1978, Mulvihill added two water slides and a go-kart track, and named the collection of rides the Vernon Valley Summer Park. Additional attractions would be built by 1980, and the park would evolve to a major destination with 75 rides (35 motorized, self-controlled rides and 40 water slides).

The park entertained over one million visitors per year during the 1980s, with as many as 12,000 coming on some of the busiest weekends. However, Action Park became infamous for poorly designed, unsafe rides; under-aged, under-trained, and often under-the-influence staff; intoxicated, unprepared visitors; and a consequently poor safety record. At least six people are known to have died as a result of mishaps on rides at the original park, and as such, it was given nicknames such as "Traction Park", "Accident Park", and "Class Action Park". In September 1989, GAR tried and failed to negotiate a deal with International Broadcasting Corporation that would result in the sale of Vernon Valley/Great Gorge, and Action Park, for $50 million.

A few rides were closed and dismantled due to costly settlements and rising insurance premiums in the 1990s, and the park's attendance began to suffer as a recession early in that decade reduced the number of visitors. In early 1995, GAR operated Vernon Valley/Great Gorge and Action Park with no liability insurance, instead relying on self-insurance. However, they ultimately purchased liability insurance. As 1995 progressed, GAR's financial woes continued to accumulate, and foreclosure suits started being filed against the corporation. Law firms also sued for compensation for services rendered between 1991 and 1993.

GAR negotiated a deal to temporary fend off an impending foreclosure, but in February 1996, the creditors who had taken on GAR's debt petitioned to force GAR into bankruptcy over the $14 million owed by the struggling company. GAR filed for Chapter 11 protection that following March but remained optimistic that they could regain their financial footing "within a year." Action Park closed at the end of the season as usual on Labor Day, September 2, 1996. Despite expecting to reopen the next year, on June 25, 1997, GAR announced the cessation of all its operations, including Action Park.

In on June 15th 2021, the ¨High Anxiety¨ waterslide caught fire and was badly damaged. No one was in the park at the time of the fire

=== Intrawest era (1998–2010) ===
Following the demise of GAR in 1997, Praedium Recovery Fund purchased the Vernon Valley-Great Gorge resort, and Action Park, for $10 million. The investment group put the company Angel Projects in charge of managing the resort, and aimed to pump in some $20 million to upgrade the ski resort's equipment, trails, and to remodel the water park.

Canadian park operator Intrawest purchased the park and neighboring Vernon Valley ski area in February 1998. The Waterworld section of Action Park was revamped and then reopened for the 1998 season as Mountain Creek. The owners, aware of the image problems created during the Action Park era, sought to differentiate themselves from their predecessors. By this time, Mountain Creek was no longer the state's largest water park, nor was it the draw that it was during its original heyday, as other water parks built around the region have since divided the market. Since Intrawest was a ski resort corporation, the water park would be leased out to Palace Entertainment after the first couple of years.

As a result of problems at the original Action Park, New Jersey toughened its amusement regulations. During the Mountain Creek era, many of the rides built during the heyday of Action Park boasted large bilingual signs advising patrons of just what the ride entailed, how deep the water was in metric and US customary units, the age it was most appropriate for, and the state regulatory ID numbers. Safety rules were strictly enforced at the new park, although alcohol was still available.

=== Sale, Action Park revival, and Mountain Creek return (2010–present) ===
In 2010, Intrawest, which ended up in bankruptcy proceedings itself as a result of a leveraged buyout, sold both the Mountain Creek ski resort and the water park to the owners of Crystal Springs Resort. The water park would remain under lease to Palace Entertainment until 2011, when the owners of the resort bought out the operating lease to the water park. This returned control of the former Action Park property, as well as the entire former Vernon Valley/Great Gorge ski area, to the Mulvihill family, as they had retained ownership of the ski area that was renamed Crystal Springs following GAR's bankruptcy.

In April 2014, the Mulvihill family changed the name of Mountain Creek back to Action Park. However, on May 29, 2016, it was announced that the Action Park name was again retired and that the park would revert to the Mountain Creek Waterpark name.

== Future development ==
In the summer of 2014, the Zero-G — a double-looping slide featuring two inclined loops — opened. The Zero-G was located on the tower for the H-2-Oh-No super speed water slide.

In 2015, plans for new park attractions were announced. These included a new lounge area and pools, relocation of batting cages to near the Action Putts Miniature Golf Course, and the construction of a temporary go-kart track by the same miniature golf course. A ride called the Sky Caliber, a vertically looping water slide, was also under development. Unlike the original Cannonball Loop, riders were to ride in bullet-shaped aluminum cages, and the slide would feature a taller and steeper approach, as well as a teardrop-shaped loop. The world's longest water slide, a 2,130-foot (650 m) inflatable slide made in 2013 in Waimauku, New Zealand, was to be moved to Mountain Creek and installed there.
