= Mountain Creek =

Ski area in New Jersey, United States

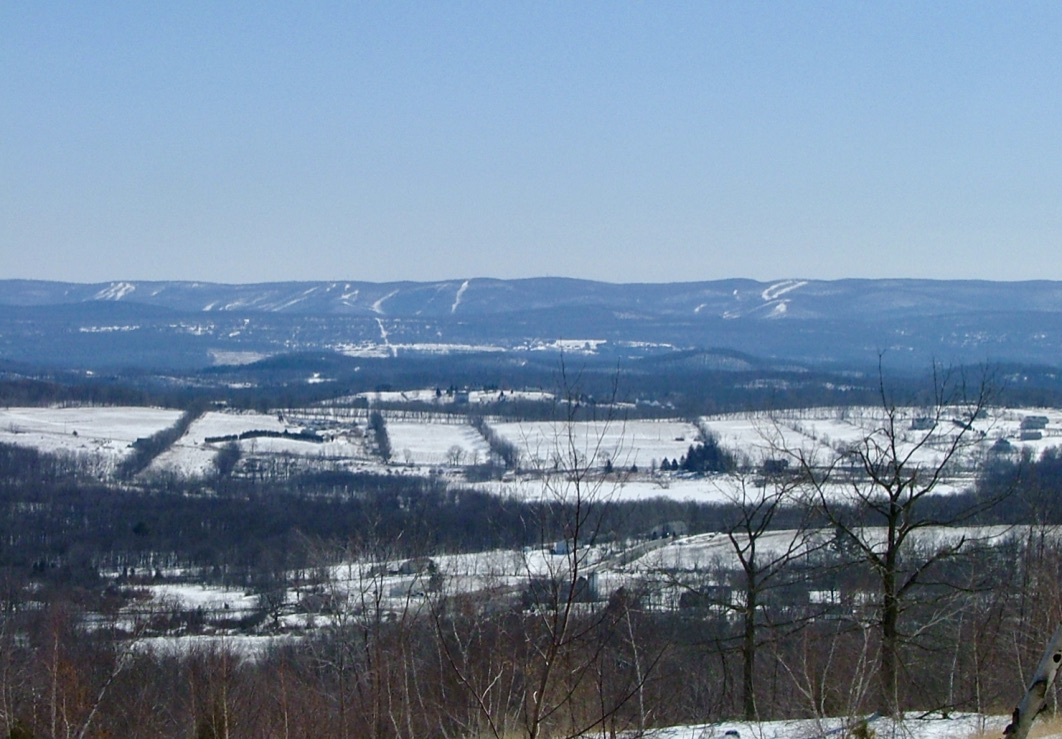
- A view of Mountain Creek from across the valley in 2004
- Interactive map of Mountain Creek
- Location: Vernon Township, New Jersey
- Nearest city: New York City; Newark, New Jersey
- Coordinates: 41.181°N 74.513°W
- Status: Operating
- Top elevation: 454 m (1,490 ft)
- Base elevation: 137 m (449 ft)
- Skiable area: 167 acres (68 ha)
- Trails: 46
- Longest run: Southern Sojourn (1,881 m (6,171 ft))
- Lift system: 9 total (1 gondola, 6 chairlifts, 2 magic carpets)
- Terrain parks: 17 Terrain Park trails on South Peak, 1 Terrain Park at Vernon Peak
- Snowfall: 165 cm (65 in)/year
- Night skiing: Yes
- Website: mountaincreek.com

Mountain Creek is a ski resort in Vernon Township, Sussex County, New Jersey, United States. It is located on New Jersey Route 94 in the New York Metropolitan Area, 47 miles (76 km) from the George Washington Bridge.

Mountain Creek contains 167 acres (68 ha) of land for skiing area, night skiing, snowboarding, and snowmaking activities. The mountain has 46 trails, 45 of which are lit for night skiing, and which is 100% covered by an automated snow-making system. The resort also includes a snow tubing park, zip-lines, an alpine coaster, a bike park, and a seasonal water park that operates from June to September. Mountain Creek has a total of 7 lifts and 2 magic carpets.

Mountain Creek was owned and operated by Intrawest Resorts Holdings, Inc. until May 2010 when it was sold to neighboring Crystal Springs Resort. Crystal Springs then sold the property to a New Jersey family. In May 2017, Mountain Creek filed for Chapter 11 bankruptcy protection. The resort emerged from bankruptcy in August 2019, and current owners, Snow Partners, took over the mountain in November 2018.

== History ==
=== 1965–2000: Great Gorge Resort and Vernon Valley ===
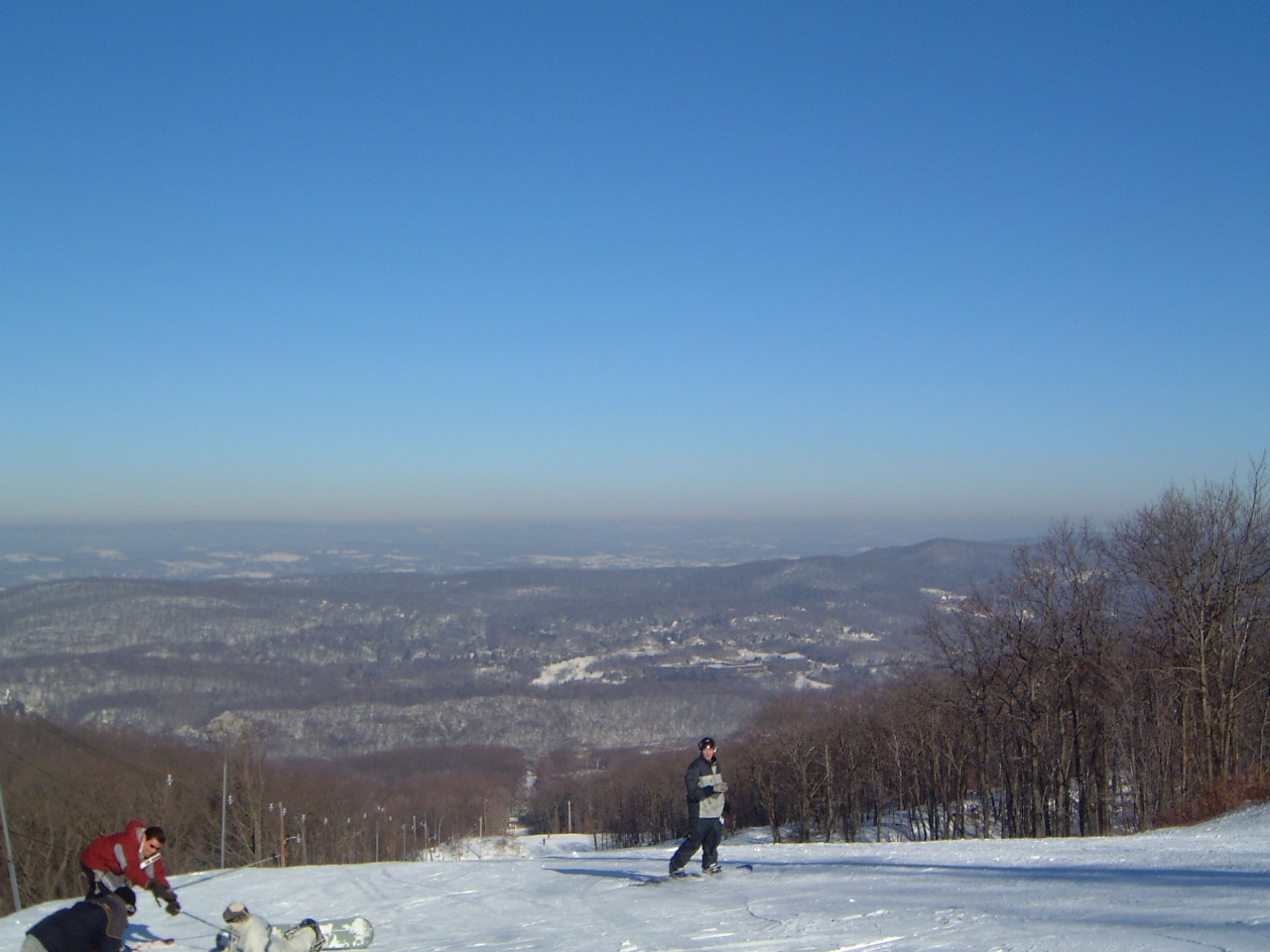
A view of Vernon from the top of the Red Tail Run at Mountain Creek

Great Gorge Resort was founded in McAfee, an unincorporated area of Vernon Township, in 1965 by Jack Kurlander and John Fitzgerald, who had worked at the now-closed Snow Bowl Ski Resort in Milton, New Jersey. Great Gorge was built on the former Fredericks farm.

Mountain Creek's Bear and South Peaks were the original Great Gorge Resort, with the current South Base Ski Patrol building serving as the Base Lodge. The original lodge was designed by Alexander McIlvaine, who also designed the lodges at Stratton Mountain in Vermont and Squaw Valley in Olympic Valley, California. After the conclusion of the 1964 New York World's Fair in New York City, the contents of the Swiss Pavilion were purchased and were transported to be incorporated into the new lodge at Great Gorge. In 1970, Great Gorge was the first ski area in the United States to use a jet engine to power their snow-making operations' air compressors.

Skiers Donna Weinbrecht and Jamie Kurlander, who have been inducted into the Sussex County Sports Hall of Fame, skied at Great Gorge. Weinbrecht went on to win the 1992 Olympic gold medal in freestyle moguls and five world championships.

The New York, Susquehanna and Western Railway operates tracks that abut the back of the Great Gorge South parking lot. For a time in the 1970s, there was a seasonal train operated by the railroad which offered skiers a way to the slopes and then returned them home.

In 1968, Vernon Valley Ski Resort opened to the north of Great Gorge. After the foreclosure of Great Gorge South and Great Gorge North, they were sold to Vernon Valley, which merged the three ski areas to form the Vernon Valley/Great Gorge Resort (VVGG).

In 1971, Great Gorge North was built on what is now Mountain Creek's Granite Peak, and a connecting trail was cut to connect Great Gorge North and the original resort, which was renamed Great Gorge South. A connecting chair lift was also installed - the Sojourn double. Great Gorge North was part of a master plan that included a never-built Olympic ski-jump and training facility.

In 1974, VVGG was purchased by Great American Recreation (GAR), which invested in snowmaking equipment that allowed the new resort to survive seasons with little snow. In 1978, VVGG opened Action Park, a seasonal amusement park with over 75 rides and attractions including 40 water slides, bungee jumping, go-karts, bumper boats and mini golf.

During the 1980s Cobblestone Village, a small shopping and dining village was built. The decade also saw the development of Great Gorge Village, a 1300-unit condo development of what were originally luxury housing units, and the Spa, at Great Gorge, a four-star luxury resort and spa complete with an 18-hole golf course and a number of indoor and outdoor swimming pools. VVGG continued to upgrade its skiing operations, installing several new lifts, including a triple chairlift in 1981.

In 1995, GAR filed for bankruptcy. In 1996, only Vernon Valley opened, with Great Gorge North and South closed due to bankruptcy. Before the 1997 season, GAR shut down Vernon Valley/Great Gorge and Action Park.

In 1998, the assets of Great American Recreation were divided and sold. Eugene Mulvihill Sr. retained control of the Great Gorge golf and hotel area of the resort, which was renamed Crystal Springs Resort. The three ski areas and Action Park were sold to Intrawest, a Canadian-based owner and operator of ski resorts.

=== The 2000s: Becoming Mountain Creek with Intrawest ===
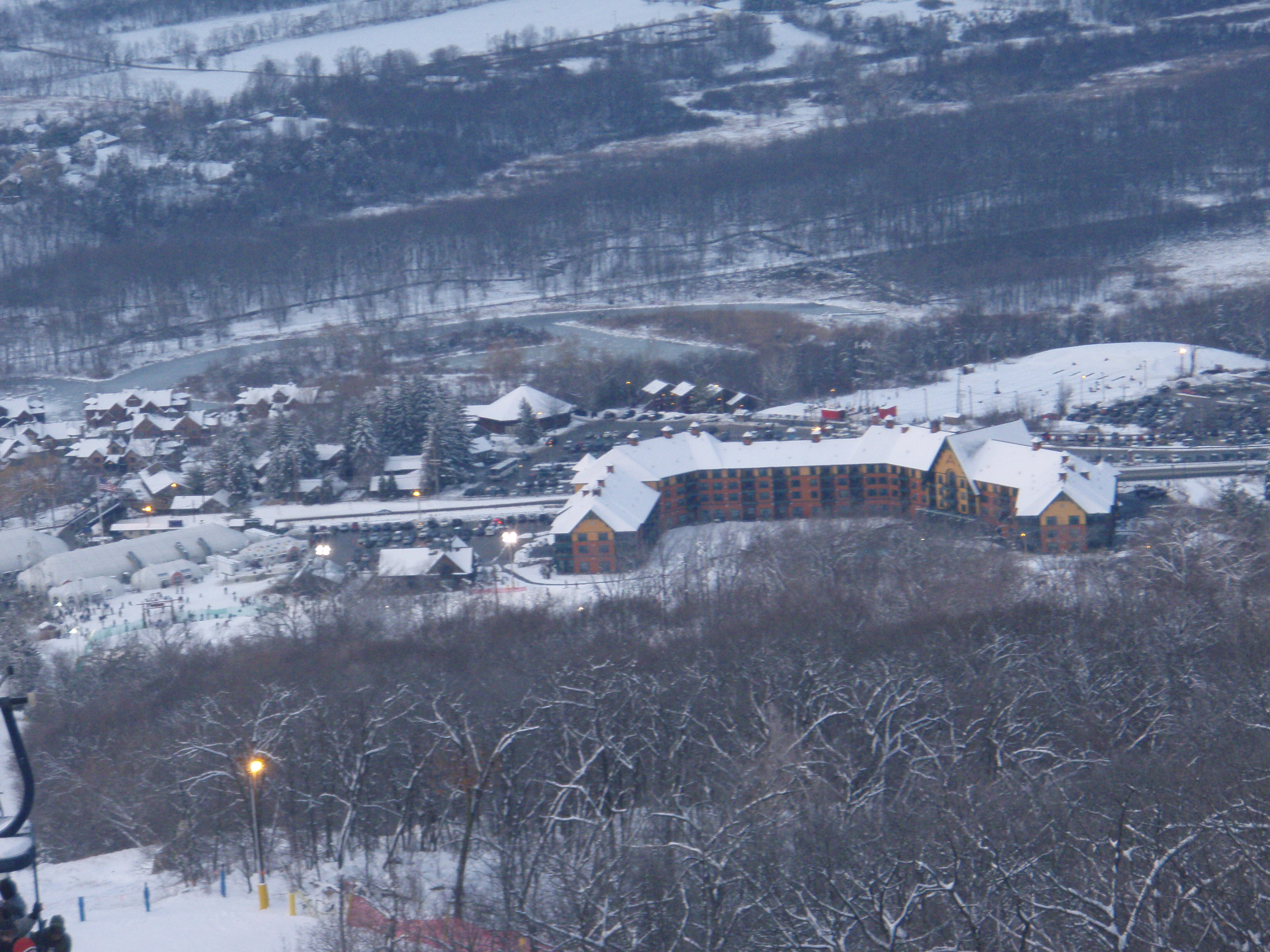
The Appalachian as seen from The Cabriolet Gondola February 23, 2008

Intrawest renamed its holdings Mountain Creek and began to refurbish the resort. Intrawest removed 11 of the 13 lifts, replacing them with a gondola, known as the Cabriolet, along with two chairlifts and multiple-fix grip chairs. The Great Gorge Lodge was updated and renamed Mountain Creek South Lodge. Intrawest also installed more than 1,600 new snow guns throughout the mountain. The new resort opened in December 1998. Intrawest moved to overhaul Action Park, removing several of the amusement rides and the Motorworld section. The water park reopened as Mountain Creek Waterpark in the summer of 1998.

In 2002, Mountain Creek opened the first phase of its master-planned resort village, Black Creek Sanctuary, a luxury condo community. In winter 2003 construction began on The Appalachian, a luxury condominium and hotel built on the former parking lot of Vernon base. Parking was moved to the other side of Route 94 to the former location of Action Park's amusement ride and bumper boat area. The Appalachian condo/hotel opened for the 2006–07 season.

Later in the summer of 2003, Intrawest opened the Diablo Mountain Bike Park on Vernon Peak, which featured numerous downhill trails serviced by the Cabriolet gondola. The same location was considered the birthplace of the ‘US Open of Mountain Biking’ in 2003.

The Chevy U.S. Snowboarding Grand Prix was held at Mountain Creek in both 2004 and 2005. The centerpiece of this event was Mountain Creek's Superpipe, one of the only superpipes in the east. The 2006 Olympic Snowboard Team was named following the 2005 event, including Andy Finch, Danny Kass and Shaun White. White went on to make his Olympic debut the following year.

Mountain Creek opened its 2007–08 winter sports season with a few notable changes to the trail map. The eastern side of Vernon Peak, which used to be home to its freestyle terrain park, was converted into intermediate slopes. The entire Mountain Creek South area (South Peak and Bear Peak) was converted to freestyle terrain park. All slopes off those peaks are intermediate trails with additional ratings for the kind of freestyle terrain from small to extra large.

In 2008, Intrawest representatives stated that during the previous two years, Intrawest and the resort industry in general experienced a significant softening of the real estate market, which included Mountain Creek, and Intrawest could not commit to completing the village. The Intrawest / Fortress Investments Co. filed for bankruptcy protection and sold off many of the resorts that it owned. The Mountain Creek Resort was sold and became part of the Crystal Springs Resort.

=== 2010s: Mountain Creek becomes part of Crystal Springs Resort ===
Intrawest sold Mountain Creek to the adjacent Crystal Springs Resort in May 2010, returning the entire resort to its previous ownership. The new owners immediately went to work on improving the mountain, replacing the tent complex at Vernon with a new lodge that opened in time for the 2011-12 ski season. A three-story building, it contains new offices, bars, fine dining restaurant, food court, rental and locker facilities and an outdoor patio.

In summer 2012, Mountain Creek continued improvement plans, opening a new zip line course at the mountaintop lake above Vernon Peak and an Alpine coaster on the lower mountainside near the waterpark. For that winter the resort expanded and relocated its tubing park across the street, renaming it the Dropzone. The Diablo Mountain Bike Park was also transferred to company control and renamed Mountain Creek Bike Park.

In 2010 Sojourn Double, the chairlift that transported people from South to Granite Peak, was retired after 40 years of service. A new fixed-grip double chairlift was installed and opened in time for the 2012–13 season.

In 2015 HSK-MC, a partner in a group that purchased Mountain Creek in 2010, bought out the rights from the former owners of Crystal Springs, which made it the sole owner of the Mountain Creek properties. HSK-MC is run by the Koffman family, including Jeff Koffman who took over as CEO of the resort.

In Spring of 2017, after back-to-back weather challenging years and faced with a legacy debt from Intrawest to the local sewer authority, the owners of Mountain Creek filed for Chapter 11 Bankruptcy.

In November 2018, Joe Hession, a local entrepreneur, Vernon native and CEO of SNOW Operating, stepped in to help restructure the resort and negotiate its debt. SNOW Operating then acquired controlling interest in Mountain Creek Resort, Inc and set up the resort to emerge from bankruptcy. Snow Operating later became Snow Partners in October 2021.

=== 2020s: Mountain Creek with SNOW Partners ===
During the COVID shutdown in early 2020, Mountain Creek was proactive in outreach to support the local community and small businesses, including offering its own accounting department to help locals apply for government assistance.

In 2024, the mountain invested more than $5 million for an automated snowmaking system to manage unreliable climate conditions and improve energy efficiency. The investment included new pipes, pumps, and 40 new fan machines, joining more than 1,000 machines already in use on the mountain’s 167 acres. The new system helped the mountain open 16 days early for the following, 2024-2025 season, compared to the year before.

== Mountain statistics ==
=== Trails ===
- 46 trails.
  - 7 beginner trails
  - 24 intermediate trails (14 of which are terrain park trails)
  - 8 advanced trails (4 of which are terrain park trails)
  - 100% of trails covered for snowmaking.

=== Lifts ===
- Mountain Creek has 6 chairlifts, one open-air gondola, and 2 magic carpets.

Name	Type	Manufacturer	Built	Vertical (feet)	Length (feet)	Notes
The Cabriolet	Gondola 8	Doppelmayr	1998	850	3639	Riders in the Cabriolet are not protected when riding, and must stand throughout the duration of the trip.
South Peak Express	High Speed Quad	Doppelmayr	1998	995	5546	Longest of the two express quads on South Peak.
Bear Peak Express	High Speed Quad	Doppelmayr	1998	675	3200	
Granite Peak	Quad	Doppelmayr	1998	859	3616	
Sugar	Quad	Partek	1998	196	1087	
Vernon	Triple	Borvig	1981	942	4253	Secondary lift to the Cabriolet, runs on weekends and holidays.
Sojourn	Double	Partek	2012	-	4800	Built to connect South Peak to Granite peak.

== See also ==
- Mountain Creek Waterpark
