= Electric Shock (disambiguation) =

An electric shock is an injury caused by an electric current.

Electric Shock may also refer to:

- Electric Shock (EP), a 2012 extended play by f(x)
  - "Electric Shock" (song), a 2012 song by f(x)
- Electric shock prod, a electroshock weapon
- Electric shock drowning, a cause of death that occurs when swimmers expose to electric currents in water
- Electric shock therapy, a psychiatric treatment

== See also ==
- Electroshock (disambiguation)
