= Class Action Park =

2020 documentary film

- Digital poster
- Directed by: Seth Porges; Chris Charles Scott III
- Produced by: Michael Garber; Chris M. Johnston; Chris Lyon; Seth Porges
- Narrated by: John Hodgman
- Cinematography: Rob Senska; Chris M. Johnston
- Edited by: Chris Lyon; Chris M. Johnston
- Music by: Ryan Holladay; Hays Holladay
- Production companies: Warner Max; Pinball Party Productions; Strategery Films
- Distributed by: HBO Max
- Release dates: August 20, 2020 (Florida Film Festival); August 27, 2020
- Running time: 90 minutes
- Language: English

Class Action Park is a 2020 documentary film about the American amusement park Action Park, which was located in Vernon Township, New Jersey. It was known for the popularity it had among locals, and is infamous for the poor safety record of the attractions located on its grounds. The title is based on one of the popular nicknames by parkgoers, alongside "Traction Park" and "Accident Park".

The film premiered virtually at the 2020 Florida Film Festival and was released a week later on HBO Max. It premiered on TNT on December 27, 2021.

== Plot ==
Class Action Park chronicles the life of penny stockbroker Eugene Mulvihill, who is described as having become rich from pump-and-dump schemes. It outlines his path to opening Vernon Township, New Jersey's Action Park in 1978. He envisioned it as a park with "no rules". The park was funded by fraudster Robert E. Brennan, who had gotten his start working for Mulvihill at Mayflower Securities, eventually becoming its president, and gaining a reputation as the "Penny Stock King." Mayflower was later suspended by the Securities and Exchange Commission for what The New York Times called "selling its customers worthless securities in a bankrupt electronics company." After being effectively kicked off Wall Street, Mulvihill purchased two ski resorts, Great Gorge and Vernon Valley in Vernon Township, an "idyllic", 68,000-square mile area of over 20,000 people whose open terrain had attracted investors such as Hugh Hefner, who chosen the town as the location of a Playboy Club in the early 1970s, where entertainers such as Tony Bennett and Wayne Newton performed. After New Jersey legalized casino gambling in 1976, investors thought Vernon could become another Orlando, Florida or Las Vegas. Because of New Jersey's short winters, Mulvihill became a pioneer in artificial snow-making, constructing one machine out of a jet engine, before deciding to build water rides to exploit the warm summers.

Former Action Park guests and employees recall the park's more dangerous rides, such as the Cannonball Loop, the SuperSpeed Waterfalls, the Alpine Slides, and the Tarzan Swings, as well as the park's general atmosphere and culture, which reflected the culture of the 1980s and that of New Jersey as a "Wild West" where such a park was able to exist. The film mentions land dispute Mulvihill had with the state of New Jersey, which ended after the state got tired of dealing with him.

The last third of the film chronicles the deaths that occurred there, the first of which was that of George Larsson Jr., which happened as he rode the Alpine Slide in 1980, but which was covered up by the park in order to conceal it from New Jersey authorities. Action Park maintained that no coverup was necessary because Larsson was not a member of the public, but an employee who rode the slide at night during a rain shower, but in fact, this was untrue. The suggestion that Mulvihill corrupted Vernon Township officials during Action Park's existence is also mentioned. After his chief source of money, Brennan, was convicted of money laundering and bankruptcy fraud, and sentenced to nearly a decade in prison, and concerns over safety became more ingrained in the public's consciousness, the park's parent company was forced into bankruptcy, making the park's 1996 Summer season its last. The Vancouver-based corporation IntraWest purchased the park, stripped out of most of its attractions, and renamed it Mountain Creek Water Park, which without Mulvilhill's vision, became, according to the film, "a generic, regional water park."

Mulvihill died in October 2012, which George Larsson Jr.'s mother Esther says was the one time she and her husband George celebrated someone's death, saying that Mulvihill "deserved to be gone," as he "did not care about any of the riders [or] any of the people." By contrast, Vernon newspaper editor Jessi Paladini, who became close to Mulvihill in the final four or five years of his life, remembers both the good and bad aspects of his personality. Insisting that she neither glorifies him nor extolls him as a "good, decent, honorable man," Paladini says that she did see a generous, benevolent side to him. Journalist Seth Porges says of Mulvihill, "It's so easy to romanticize him, because he does what a lot of people wish they coud do. A lot people wish they could ignore the law. A lot of people wish they could ignore rules. Gene actually did that."

Former guests of the park reflect on Action Park as a whole. Financial journalist Mary Pilon observes that the park's vision continues to live on in schemes such as those surrounding the Fyre Festival and Theranos. Another former park guest, writer/comedian Chris Gethard, disputes this analogy, saying that Fyre Festival gave guests "a cheese sandwich", whereas "Gene gave you everything he fucking promised you." Writer/actress Alison Becker, another former guest of the park, says, "Even though I was scared to do those rides, I fucking did 'em. There's also a part of me that's like, 'If you can't do 'em, fucking get out of Jersey." Former park security director Jim DeSaye says Action Park was "an 80s movie that was real life, and it's something that will never happen again."

In the film's final minutes, it details that in May 2010, two years before his death, Gene Mulvill led a group of investors to take back the park and restore its previous name, in a bid to capitalize on nostalgia. This included plans for an updated version of the Cannonball Loop ride, but which was never built. By 2018, the park, now again called Mountain Creek, was acquired by Vernon native Joe Hession, who had been an Action Park employee in his teens.

In the final shot before the closing credits, Esther Larsson is seen visiting George's grave with his younger brother Brian.

== Cast ==
- John Hodgman - Narrator
- Chris Gethard
- Alison Becker
- Jim DeSaye - former Action Park security director
- Esther Larsson - mother of George Larsson Jr
- Faith Anderson - former Action Park lifeguard
- Jason Scott
- Ed Youmans - former Action Park Manager of Operations

== Reception ==
Class Action Park was the number one film on HBO Max for the week following its premiere date of August 27, 2020. It has been praised by many critics for pointing out the dark side of the park and talking about the people who died at the park. As of October 2021, 96% of the 52 reviews compiled on Rotten Tomatoes are positive, with an average rating of 7.5/10. The website's critics consensus reads, "Disturbing and thrilling in equal measure, Class Action Park is a raucous chronicle of the infamous water park that was as beloved as it was dangerous."
