= Electroshock =

Electroshock may refer to:

- Electroshock (album), a 2012 album by Kate Ryan
- Electroshock (wrestler), ring name of Edgar Luna Pozos (born 1970), Mexican luchador
- Electroshock therapy, the former name for electroconvulsive therapy
- Electroshock weapon, an incapacitating weapon

== See also ==
- Electric Shock (disambiguation)
