= Intrawest =

Defunct Canadian company

Intrawest Resorts Holdings, Inc.
- Type: Private
- Traded as: NYSE: SNOW
- Founded: 1973; 53 years ago
- Defunct: 2017
- Fate: Merged
- Successor: Alterra Mountain Company
- Headquarters: Denver, Colorado, U.S.
- Key people: Tom Marano (CEO)
- Number of employees: 13,900
- Website: www.intrawest.com

Intrawest Resorts Holdings, Inc. was a developer and operator of destination resorts and a luxury adventure travel company. After a series of sales and divestitures, they form the core of today's Alterra Mountain Company.

The company was founded in Vancouver, British Columbia, in 1976 (Note: Sources vary, some say 1976, others 1973.) as Intrawest Properties Ltd. by Joe Houssian. The company initially focussed on residential real estate development, building 26 projects encompassing about 1,800 apartments, townhouses, and single-family homes in Vancouver, Edmonton and Calgary. They also ran an investment arm, Intrawest Equities Ltd., and the two merged to become Intrawest Development Corporation in 1979. During the 1980s, the company focused mainly on commercial real estate and mixed-use developments, building a portfolio of shopping malls.

The company changed directions radically in the late 1990s. This started with the purchase of half of Blackcomb Skiing Enterprises from the Aspen Skiing Company in 1986, followed by a $112 million expansion that increased visits from 278,000 in 1986 to 972,000 in 1995. The purchase also included rights to develop up to 8,000 "bed units" at the mountain base. The company initially sold development rights to these plots to fund their expansion, but in 1989 they began their own developments and by 1993 had 1,400 "resort units" under various ownership and timeshare arrangements.

The company went public on the Toronto Stock Exchange 1990, using the $26 million IPO income to purchase Mont Tremblant in Quebec in 1991. They began to divest their older commercial holdings to purchase more resorts, changing their name to Intrawest Corporation in 1993. That year they purchased Panorama Resort in British Columbia, entered a partnership with Ralston Purina Company to develop River Run Village. They added Stratton Mountain Resort and Mont-Sainte-Anne in 1994, Snowshoe Mountain in 1995, Mammoth Mountain and Copper Mountain in 1996, (half of) Blue Mountain (ski resort) in 1999. As the industry began to be bought up, they began branching out into other resort properties like golf courses and beach resorts. Through this period they were known for their "village" designs at the resorts, based on the award-winning Whistler Village next to Blackcomb. Intrawest purchases Whistler in 1997 and merged it to form the modern Whistler-Blackcomb.

In 2006, the company was taken private by Fortress Investment Group for $2.8 billion, which included almost $1 billion in debt. In 2011 the company relocated to Denver. Fortress was under financial pressure related to the Intrawest debt, but a new loan with a single lender was completed in April 2010 and all prior lenders were repaid in full. In May 2017, Henry Crown and Company and KSL Capital Partners purchased Intrawest, and in 2018 renamed it Alterra Mountain Company.

== History ==
Intrawest was founded in Vancouver, British Columbia, by Joe Houssain.

In 1986, Intrawest acquired Blackcomb Mountain from the Federal Business Development Bank, a Canadian Crown Corporation, and Fortress Mountain of Alberta (no relation to Fortress Investments LLC), a wholly owned division of Aspen Skiing Company. The company later went public, listed on the Toronto and New York Stock Exchanges and, in 1996, merged with Whistler Mountain Ski Corporation to form Whistler-Blackcomb resort, a venue of the 2010 Winter Olympics and Paralympic Games. Intrawest eventually spun off Whistler-Blackcomb and sold the last of its shares in that company in 2012.

The Intrawest network included mountain resorts, the Club Intrawest private resort club with nine locations in North America, and Canadian Mountain Holidays, the largest heli-skiing operation in the world.

Intrawest was acquired by Fortress Investment Group in 2006, at which time CEO Houssain stepped down, and the company was delisted from the Toronto Stock Exchange and New York Stock Exchange. In 2011, the company relocated from Vancouver to Denver, Colorado.

On November 12, 2013, Intrawest filed an initial public offering with the New York Stock Exchange to raise up to $100 Million.

In 2016, Intrawest initiated significant reductions in full time staff to achieve rapid cost reductions. Numerous key staff positions have been eliminated at its corporate headquarters and resort locations. This follows the sale of the Club Intrawest time share lodging operation to Diamond Resorts International at the end of 2015. It is unclear regarding the company's longer term strategies as it continues to display inconsistent approaches in its business and staffing model. In 2017, Intrawest was sold to Henry Crown and Company (which owns Aspen Skiing Company) and KSL Capital Partners for $1.5 billion. In May 2017, it was announced that Intrawest would no longer exist as public company. The newly formed company is called Alterra Mountain Company, which was announced at the 2018 Outdoor Retailer Show in Denver, Colorado.

== Latest resorts ==
Resorts owned at least in part by Intrawest included:

- Blue Mountain, Ontario
- Snowshoe Mountain, West Virginia
- Steamboat Ski Resort, Colorado
- Stratton Mountain Resort, Vermont
- Mont Tremblant Resort, Quebec
- Canadian Mountain Holidays, Alberta
- Winter Park, Colorado (Intrawest was contracted to operate this city park owned by the City of Denver.)
- Zihuatanejo, Mexico

=== Former resorts ===
- Mont Ste. Marie, Québec (February 2002)
- Mammoth Mountain Ski Area, California (October 2005)
- Whistler Blackcomb, British Columbia
- Copper Mountain, Colorado (November 2009)
- Les Arcs 1950, France (October 2009)
- Flaine Montsoleil development, France (October 2009)
- Panorama Mountain Village, British Columbia (January 2010)
- Mountain Creek, New Jersey (May 2010)
- Sandestin Golf & Beach Resort, Florida (March 2010)
- The Village at Squaw Valley, California (January 2010)
