= Electric shock drowning =

Death from electric currents while swimming

Electric shock drowning is a term used in the US to describe a cause of death that occurs when swimmers are exposed to electric currents in the water. In some cases the shock itself is fatal, since the person will suffocate when their diaphragm is paralyzed, while in others it incapacitates the swimmer causing them to drown. The main cause of electric shock drownings is faulty electrical wiring on boats or piers that causes electric current to leak into the water. Electric shock drownings occur most often in fresh water, which is conductive due to dissolved minerals and impurities. The increased conductivity of saltwater reduces the fraction of the electric current that flows through a submerged person, whose body has a much smaller conductivity than the saltwater. In this case, the current to cause electric shock drowning would be so great that current-limiting circuit breakers would trip and shut off the current, thereby protecting against electric shock drowning in saltwater.

Sometimes Electric Shock Drowning is referred to as ESD, but this should not be used as it can be confused with the IEC-defined abbreviation for electrostatic discharge. The accident type is prevalent only in the USA, possibly due to a history of weaker ground-fault protection requirements at marinas.

== Causes ==
Electric shock drownings are most commonly caused by improper electrical connections on boats and piers. By law, all connections near water are required to have working ground fault circuit interruption technology, GFCI. These devices break the electrical circuit if any stray current fails to return to the source connection. If GFCI devices are missing or faulty, it is possible for current to leak into the water. If a system is leaking current into the water, appliances will likely function as normal without any indication of a problem. Correctly functioning GFCI and ELCI devices will instantaneously detect the problem and disconnect the power source.

Special attention is required toward electrical safety devices on boats. These safety devices can fail for various reasons. Since deterioration of insulation on wires is common in boating conditions it is critical for these devices to work properly.

Besides boats and dockside power hookups, several other potential causes exist. Lightning strikes over or near water have caused electric shock drownings. Faulty hydroelectric generators or damaged underwater power lines can cause leakage currents, potentially creating a hazard. In general, anything electrically active that comes in contact with water has the potential to create leakage currents and contribute to this type of safety hazard.

== Prevention ==
Beyond ensuring that all electrical hookups on piers and boats in the vicinity are code compliant and safe, various precautions can be taken by the swimmer. The primary method is to swim at a safe distance from all electrically active devices. One source recommends keeping a distance of at least 100 yards from freshwater marinas while swimming.

Although sensors exist that can detect leakage current in the water, these are unsuitable to use as an alarm device. These instruments provide no advanced warning before a problem starts. If a hazard condition is created, swimmers will be affected at the same time the instrument detects the current. It is common for faults to be tied to appliances or circuits that come on intermittently, meaning that the condition of the water can change instantly and unpredictably.

The best strategy for avoiding electrical hazards is to swim in designated areas well away from any devices that present a risk.

== Signs ==
There is no visible warning to electrified water. Swimmers will be able to feel the electricity if the current is substantial. If the swimmers notice any unusual tingling feeling or symptoms of electrical shock, it is highly likely that stray currents exist and everyone needs to get out. Swimmers should always swim away from the suspected current source. In most cases this means swimming away from piers and boats and toward another safer portion of the shoreline.

== Rescue ==
The primary method of rescue is to get the swimmer away from the current source by any means possible, EXCEPT by sending out rescue swimmers. This means Row and Throw, but do not Go. If stray currents are suspected, a rescue by another swimmer should never be attempted. For cases where swimmers can feel mild tingling, getting flotation devices out to them can aid them to swim away from the current source under their own power. In cases where the current source is obvious, it may be possible for bystanders on foot to disconnect it. Dockside power hookups often have integrated or nearby breakers by which the source can be de-energized.

== Treatment ==
Once the victim is safely on shore, first aid may be needed. Treatment depends on the specifics of each case, but is likely some combination of the treatments for electrocution and drowning individually. Even if the victim seems well, examination by healthcare professional is recommended as latent effects from the electricity may be undetected.
