= Summer toboggan =

Type of ride

Ride on rodelbahn in ski resort Bobrovy Log, Krasnoyarsk, Russia (descent begins at 5:55)

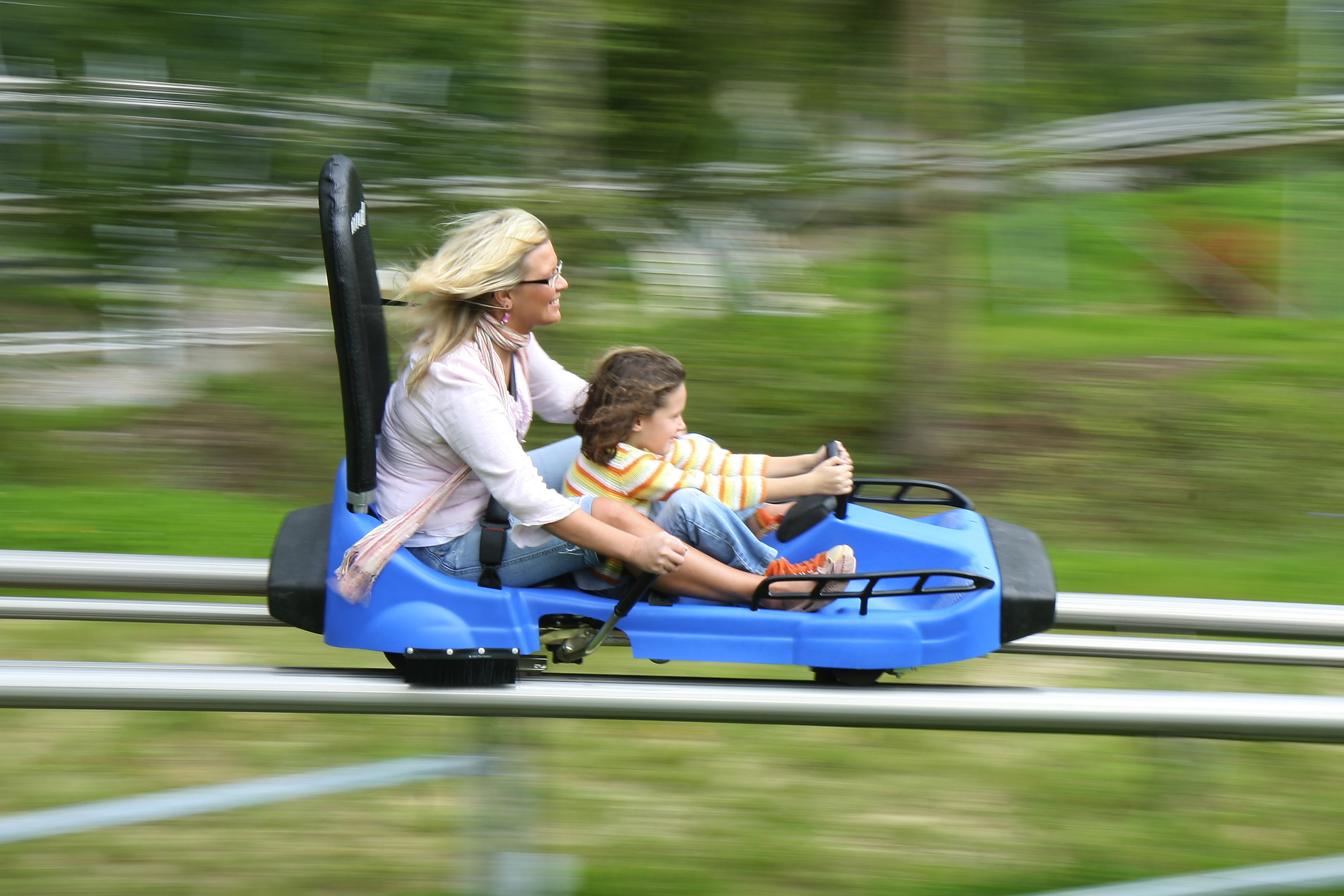
Alpine coaster at the Eifelpark in Germany

A summer toboggan is an amusement or recreational ride which uses a bobsled-like sled or cart to run down a track usually built on the side of a hill. There are two main types: an alpine coaster or mountain coaster is a type of roller coaster where the cart runs on rails and is not able to leave the track, whereas with an alpine slide the cart simply runs on a smooth concave track usually made of metal, concrete or fiberglass. Both of these are sometimes denoted with the German term, Sommerrodelbahn.

They are often built by ski resorts in order to use existing winter infrastructure and provide additional summer income, although some installations are part of amusement parks or are standalone.

As of 2007, the longest summer toboggan in the world is the 17,400 feet (5,300 m) long Tobotronc alpine coaster at Naturlandia in Andorra. The highest in the world is the 3,300 feet (1,000 m) long Glacier 3000 alpine coaster in Gstaad, Switzerland which starts at an elevation of 9,747 feet (2,971 m).

== History ==
The first form of summer toboggan was the alpine slide, which started in its present form in the 1970s. An early innovator, Josef Wiegand, had envisioned the idea of creating a roller coaster ride for ski resorts that would take advantage of the topography of the land, rather than building a structure to create the elevation changes that traditional roller coasters required. His company developed and installed its first alpine slide (with stainless steel tracks, rather than what became the customary fiberglass or concrete tracks), in 1975. Brandauer, Inc. installed the first alpine coaster in 1996 at the Karkogel Resort in Abtenau, Austria, followed less than a year later with the installation of the Wiegand alpine coaster, under the "Alpine Coaster" trademark, in 1997.

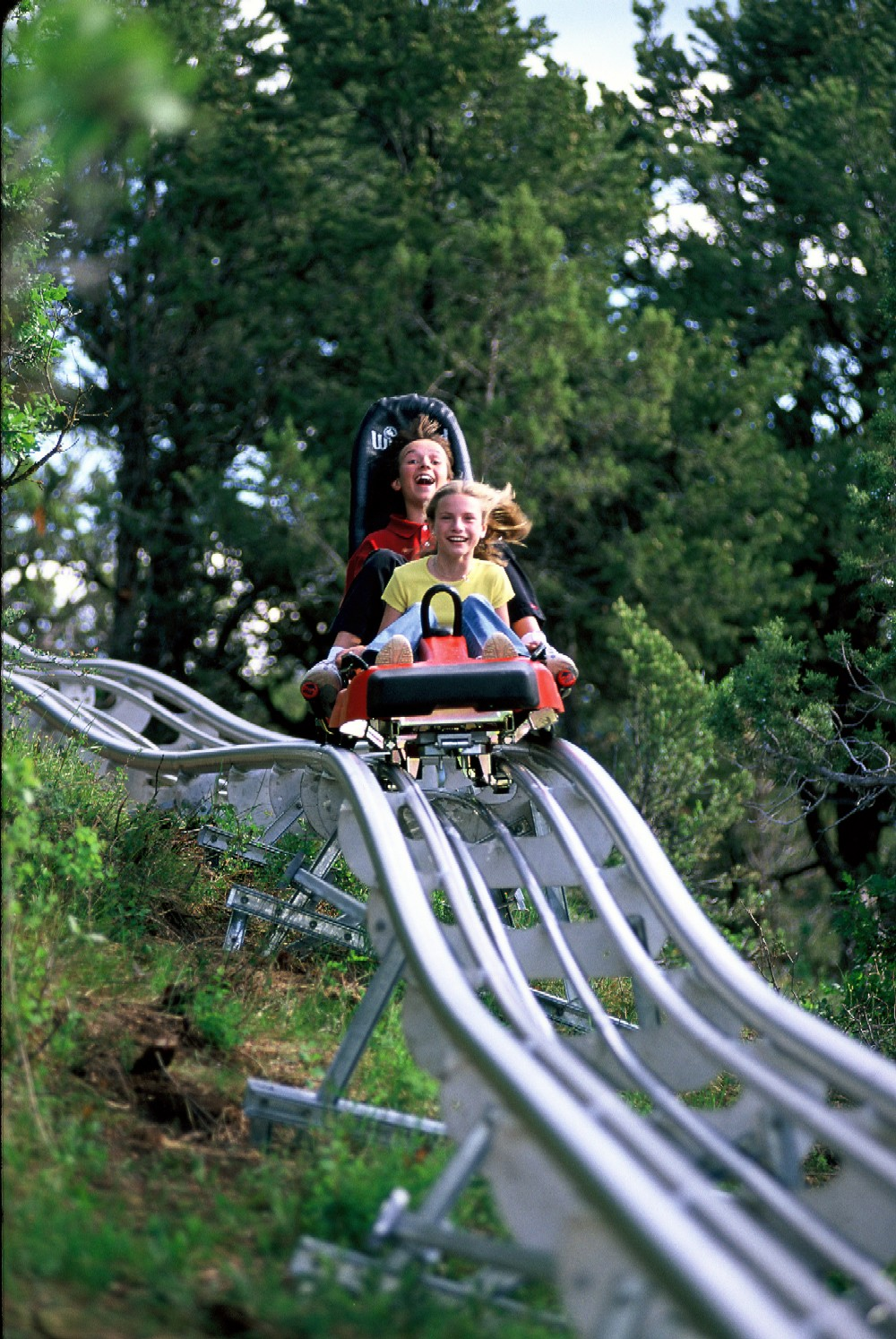
The dips of the Wiegand alpine coaster at the Eifelpark in Rhineland-Palatinate, Germany

== Construction and use ==
Summer toboggans are installed by ski resorts as an added year-round attraction, or they may be installed seasonally to augment income during summer months. For the latter purpose, they are built using easily removable tracks that are placed over the pistes after the ski season. The tracks are designed for easy installation, with minimal impact to the topsoil and environment, as they are normally built close to the ground and take advantage of the natural elevation of the terrain. Little to no concrete work is needed, except at the station. Bridges and pillars up to 5 metres (16 ft) tall can be incorporated to negotiate roads, trails, ski slopes or water crossings. The track material is usually aluminum or stainless steel, used for low maintenance and durability.

Closed-loop tracks include a lift system during the course of the ride. Some ski resort rides eliminate the long tedious climb up to the top by utilizing an existing ski lift to take riders to the top of the course, so that they can simply take a one-way downhill run back to the start station.

Additional thrill elements for alpine coasters can include varying degrees of curves, dips, and hairpin turns. Large spiral circles (helixes) can be used not only as a thrill element, but also for reducing elevation.

Depending on the track and brake materials, summer toboggans can sometimes operate throughout the year, even in light rain and snow.

== Operation ==
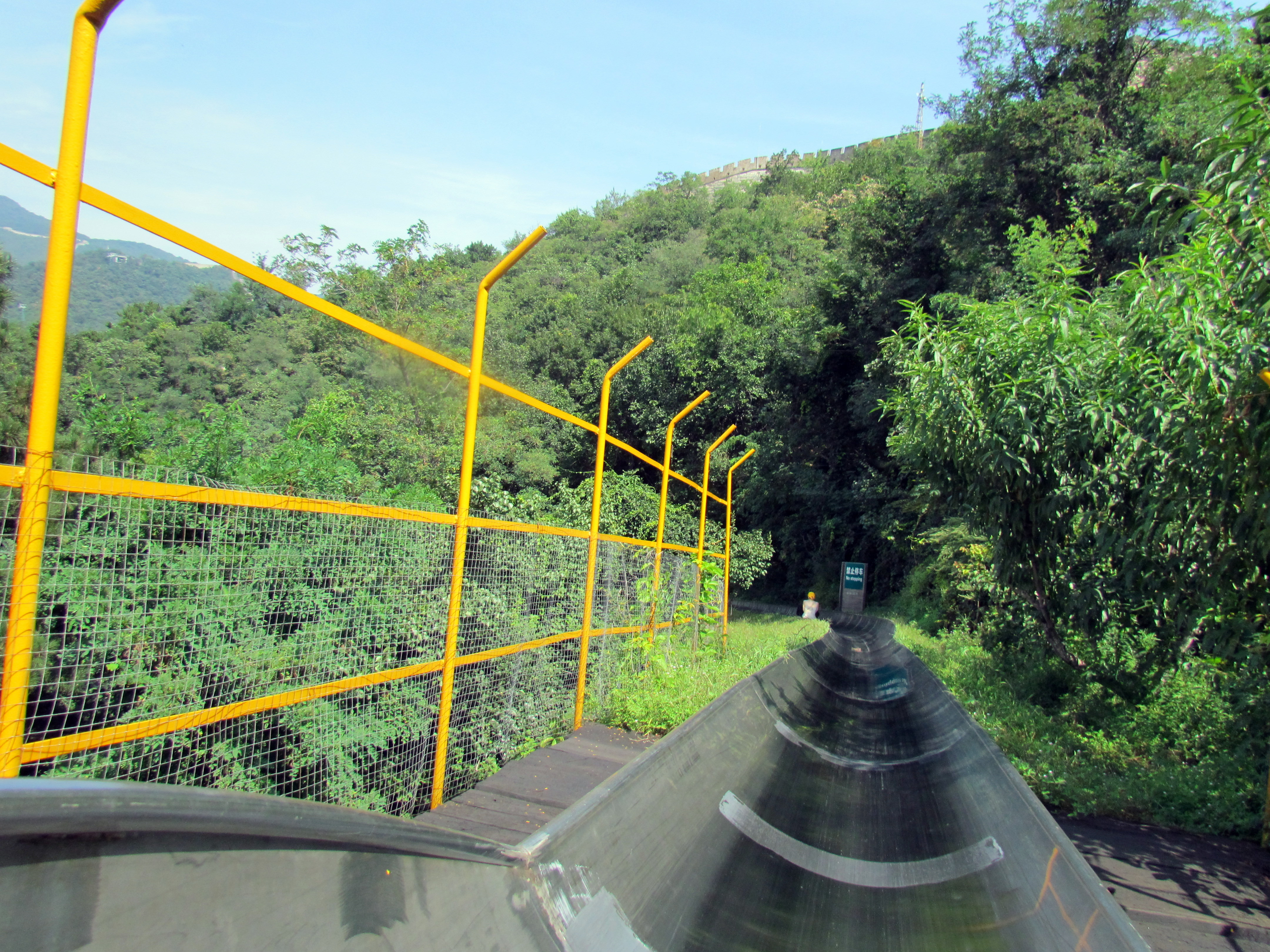
View along the alpine slide track at Mutianyu, China

Each sled accommodates one or two passengers and is controlled by a hand brake lever located either on both sides or in the middle. Riders are advised to keep their hands on the brake at all times for safety reasons. Pulling the brake handle causes the sled to slow down or stop; pushing or letting go of the handle causes the brakes to release, allowing the sled to accelerate. With this control comes responsibility: the rider must ensure that they do not go too fast as otherwise accidents can happen, although with a properly designed installation this is rare. Summer toboggans are unique among amusement park rides in that the rider has complete control over their speed and the ride experience. Riders can opt for a slower leisurely run, or one with minimal or no braking for a faster thrilling ride.

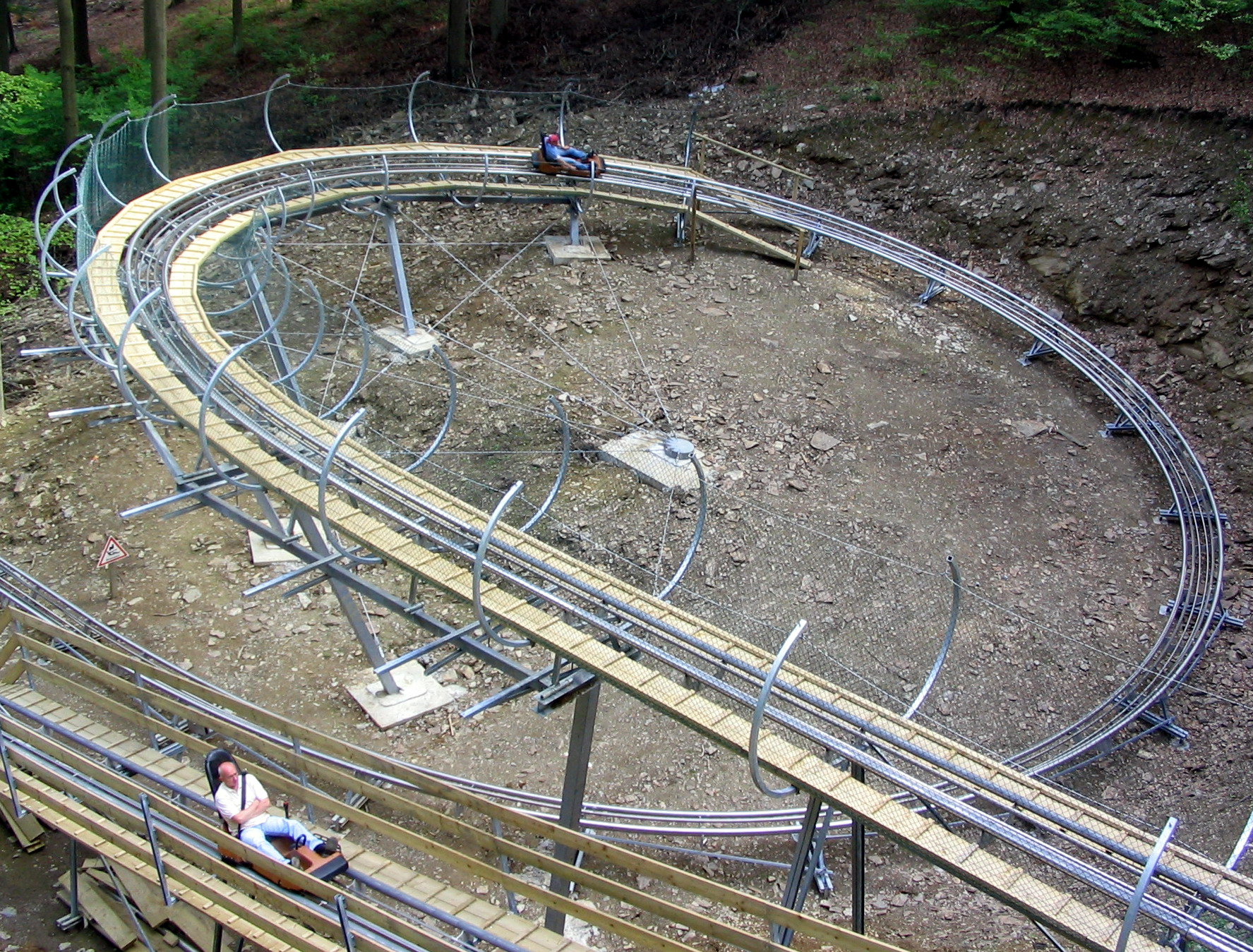
Safety nets along the closed loop of the Trapper Slider mountain coaster at Fort Fun Abenteuerland in Germany

== Safety ==
Alpine coaster carts are equipped with a centrifugal brake system that controls its maximum speed by limiting the rotational speed of the running wheels. Some newer generation coasters are equipped with an anti-collision system that automatically applies the brakes if the rider gets too close to the one ahead. Each cart is equipped with front and rear bumpers to absorb shocks in case of collision.

Even with such safety systems available, riders on both types of runs are responsible for—and are required (as a common courtesy) to keep—a safe braking distance from any riders in front of them. To secure the riders in their seats, each car is equipped with 3-point automotive seat belts for the rider and any passenger. Riders are also advised to wear suitable clothing without long loose parts, and to secure pocket contents and other items that could be lost.

Tracks may also have safety nets installed, especially on steep curves, as an added precaution.
